= List of Parks and Recreation characters =

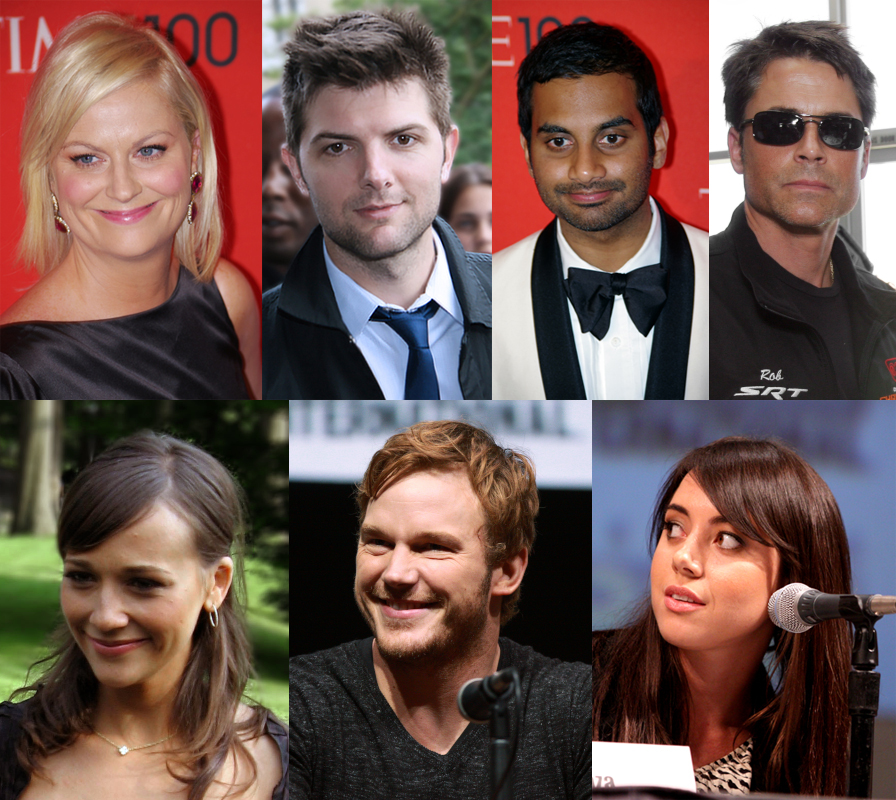
Members of the cast of Parks and Recreation, including (from left to right) Amy Poehler, Adam Scott, Aziz Ansari, Rob Lowe, Rashida Jones, Chris Pratt, and Aubrey Plaza. Also regular cast, but not included in the image, Nick Offerman and Paul Schneider.

The primary characters of the American television comedy series Parks and Recreation are the employees of the parks department of Pawnee, a fictional Indiana town. The protagonist is Leslie Knope (Amy Poehler), the deputy parks director as well as serving on city council, and the rest of the ensemble cast consists of her friends and co-workers, including nurse Ann Perkins (Rashida Jones), parks director Ron Swanson (Nick Offerman), and parks department employees Tom Haverford (Aziz Ansari), April Ludgate (Aubrey Plaza), Andy Dwyer (Chris Pratt), Jerry Gergich (Jim O'Heir), and Donna Meagle (Retta).

While most of the main cast have been with the series since it debuted in April 2009, actors Rob Lowe and Adam Scott joined the cast late in the second season portraying Chris Traeger and Ben Wyatt, two state auditors who later take permanent jobs in Pawnee. Paul Schneider was a regular cast member during the first two seasons as city planner Mark Brendanawicz, but he departed at the end of season two. Billy Eichner who portrays Craig Middlebrooks, the "associate administrator" of the Pawnee parks department, recurred throughout the show's sixth season until he was promoted to the main cast in the fourth episode of the seventh season. The majority of Parks and Recreation episodes are set in Pawnee, and most of the recurring and supporting characters are friends of the main characters or residents of the town.

Several guest stars have made appearances on the show, including Louis C.K., John Larroquette, Justin Theroux and Parker Posey. Megan Mullally, Offerman's real-life wife, played his character's ex-wife Tammy Swanson, and Poehler's former husband Will Arnett made an appearance as a man on a blind date with Leslie. Several of Poehler's past colleagues on the sketch comedy series Saturday Night Live have appeared on Parks and Recreation, including Fred Armisen, Will Forte and Andy Samberg.

== Cast overview ==
Main cast and characters
Character	Portrayed by	Seasons							
Character	Portrayed by	1	2	3	4	5	6	7	Special
Main characters
Leslie Knope	Amy Poehler	Main	Main	Main	Main	Main	Main	Main	Main
Ann Perkins	Rashida Jones	Main (Note: Jones is credited through 6x13 and as a special guest in 6x17)	Main	Main	Main	Main	Main	Guest	Main
Mark Brendanawicz	Paul Schneider	Main	Main						
Tom Haverford	Aziz Ansari	Main	Main	Main	Main	Main	Main	Main	Main
Ron Swanson	Nick Offerman	Main	Main	Main	Main	Main	Main	Main	Main
April Ludgate	Aubrey Plaza	Main	Main	Main	Main	Main	Main	Main	Main
Andy Dwyer	Chris Pratt	Recurring (Note: While credited as "Guest Starring" in the opening credits, Pratt appears in every episode.)	Main	Main	Main	Main	Main	Main	Main
Ben Wyatt	Adam Scott		Starring (Note: Credited starting with season 2 episode 23: “The Master Plan”)	Main	Main	Main	Main	Main	Main
Chris Traeger	Rob Lowe		Starring	Main (Note: Lowe is credited through 6x13)	Main	Main	Main	Guest	Main
Jerry Gergich	Jim O'Heir	Recurring	Recurring	Starring	Starring	Starring	Main (Note: Promoted in season 6 episode 14: “Anniversaries”)	Main	Main
Donna Meagle	Retta	Recurring	Recurring	Starring	Starring	Starring	Main	Main	Main
Craig Middlebrooks	Billy Eichner						Recurring	Starring (Note: Promoted in season 7 episode 4: “Leslie and Ron”)	
Recurring characters
Marlene Griggs-Knope	Pamela Reed	Recurring	Guest	Guest	Guest	Guest			
Paul Iaresco	Phil Reeves	Guest	Recurring	Guest					
Shauna Malwae-Tweep	Alison Becker	Guest	Recurring	Recurring	Guest	Recurring	Recurring	Guest	
Burly	Andrew Burlinson	Guest	Recurring	Guest	Guest	Guest	Recurring	Guest	
Wendy Haverford	Jama Williamson	Guest	Recurring	Recurring					
Derek	Blake Lee	Guest	Recurring	Guest					
Ben	Josh Duvendeck		Recurring	Guest					
Dave Sanderson	Louis C.K.		Recurring		Guest				
Perd Hapley	Jay Jackson		Recurring	Recurring	Recurring	Recurring	Recurring	Recurring	Special Guest
Jean-Ralphio Saperstein	Ben Schwartz		Recurring	Recurring	Recurring	Recurring	Recurring	Guest	Special Guest
Joan Callamezzo	Mo Collins		Recurring	Guest	Guest	Recurring	Recurring	Recurring	Special Guest
Justin Anderson	Justin Theroux		Recurring						
Jessica Wicks	Susan Yeagley		Recurring			Recurring	Recurring	Recurring	
Joe Fantringham	Kirk Fox		Recurring	Recurring	Recurring	Recurring			
Kyle	Andy Forrest		Recurring	Recurring	Recurring		Recurring	Guest	
Barney Varmn	John Balma		Recurring		Guest	Guest	Recurring	Guest	
Tammy Swanson	Megan Mullally		Guest	Recurring	Recurring	Guest	Recurring	Guest	Special Guest
Bill Dexhart	Kevin Symons		Guest			Recurring	Recurring	Guest	
Lucy Santo Domingo	Natalie Morales		Guest	Recurring	Guest			Recurring	
Councilman Howser	Yvans Jourdain		Guest	Guest	Guest	Recurring	Recurring	Recurring	
Marcia Langman	Darlene Hunt		Guest	Recurring		Recurring		Guest	
Brett	Colton Dunn		Guest	Guest		Recurring	Guest	Guest	
Harris	Harris Wittels		Guest	Guest	Guest	Recurring	Guest	Guest	
Orin	Eric Isenhower			Recurring	Recurring	Recurring	Recurring	Guest	
Ethel Beavers	Helen Slayton-Hughes			Guest	Guest	Recurring	Recurring	Guest	
Brandi Maxxxx	Mara Marini			Guest	Guest	Recurring		Recurring	
William Barnes	Johnny Sneed			Guest	Recurring				
Elizabeth	Antonia Raftu			Guest	Recurring				
Millicent Gergich	Sarah Wright				Recurring	Guest			
Bobby Newport	Paul Rudd				Recurring			Guest	Special Guest
Jennifer Barkley	Kathryn Hahn				Recurring	Guest	Guest	Recurring	
Herman Lerpiss	Richard Burch					Recurring	Guest	Recurring	
Jeremy Jamm	Jon Glaser					Recurring	Recurring	Recurring	Special Guest
Diane Lewis-Swanson	Lucy Lawless					Recurring	Recurring		
Zoe Lewis	Sadie Salazar					Recurring	Recurring		
Ivy Lewis	Rylan Lee					Recurring	Recurring		
Mona Lisa Saperstein	Jenny Slate					Recurring	Recurring	Guest	
Kathryn Pinewood	Mary Faber					Recurring	Guest		
Councilman Milton	James Greene					Recurring	Recurring	Guest	
Trevor Nelsson	Marc Evan Jackson					Guest	Recurring	Recurring	
Ingrid de Forest	Kristen Bell						Recurring		
Dr. Lu Saperstein	Henry Winkler						Recurring	Guest	
Madison	Sydney Endicott						Recurring		
Ron Dunn	Sam Elliott						Recurring	Guest	
Joe Meagle	Keegan-Michael Key						Guest	Recurring	
Typhoon	Rodney To						Guest	Recurring	
Roscoe Santangelo	Jorma Taccone							Recurring	

== Main cast ==
Each of the following primary characters were played by members of the Parks and Recreation regular cast, rather than guest stars or non-regular supporting cast members.

=== Leslie Knope ===
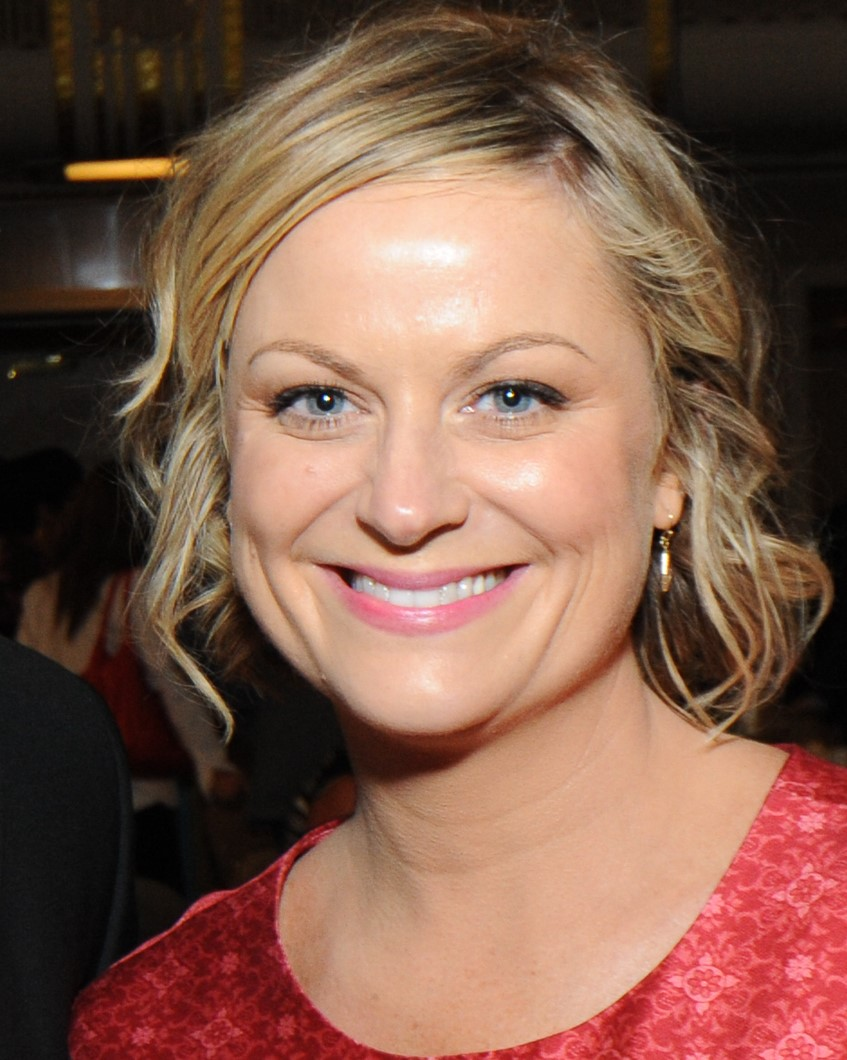
Amy Poehler

Leslie Knope (Amy Poehler) is the deputy director of the Pawnee Parks and Recreation Department, and the protagonist of Parks and Recreation. Leslie is a passionate, hard-working and ambitious woman who loves her hometown of Pawnee and, unlike many around her, has not lost her optimism in the face of government bureaucracy. She believes strongly in the mission of her job, sometimes going over-the-top in her dedication to helping people. Her dream is to become the first female President of the United States. During the first two seasons, Leslie seeks to turn a construction pit into a park, despite several government obstacles and red tape. When the parks department is hindered by Pawnee's budget problems, Leslie successfully relaunches the town's harvest festival, which makes her department sustainable again. The third season ends with political scouts approaching her about possibly running for elected office, although she declines to inform them of her secret affair with Ben Wyatt, which could prove to be a political scandal. In season four, Leslie furthers her political ambitions when she successfully runs for city council. Season 5 focused mainly on Leslie's experiences on the Pawnee City Council. In season six, however, she is recalled and returns full-time to work in the Parks and Recreation department.

=== Ann Perkins ===
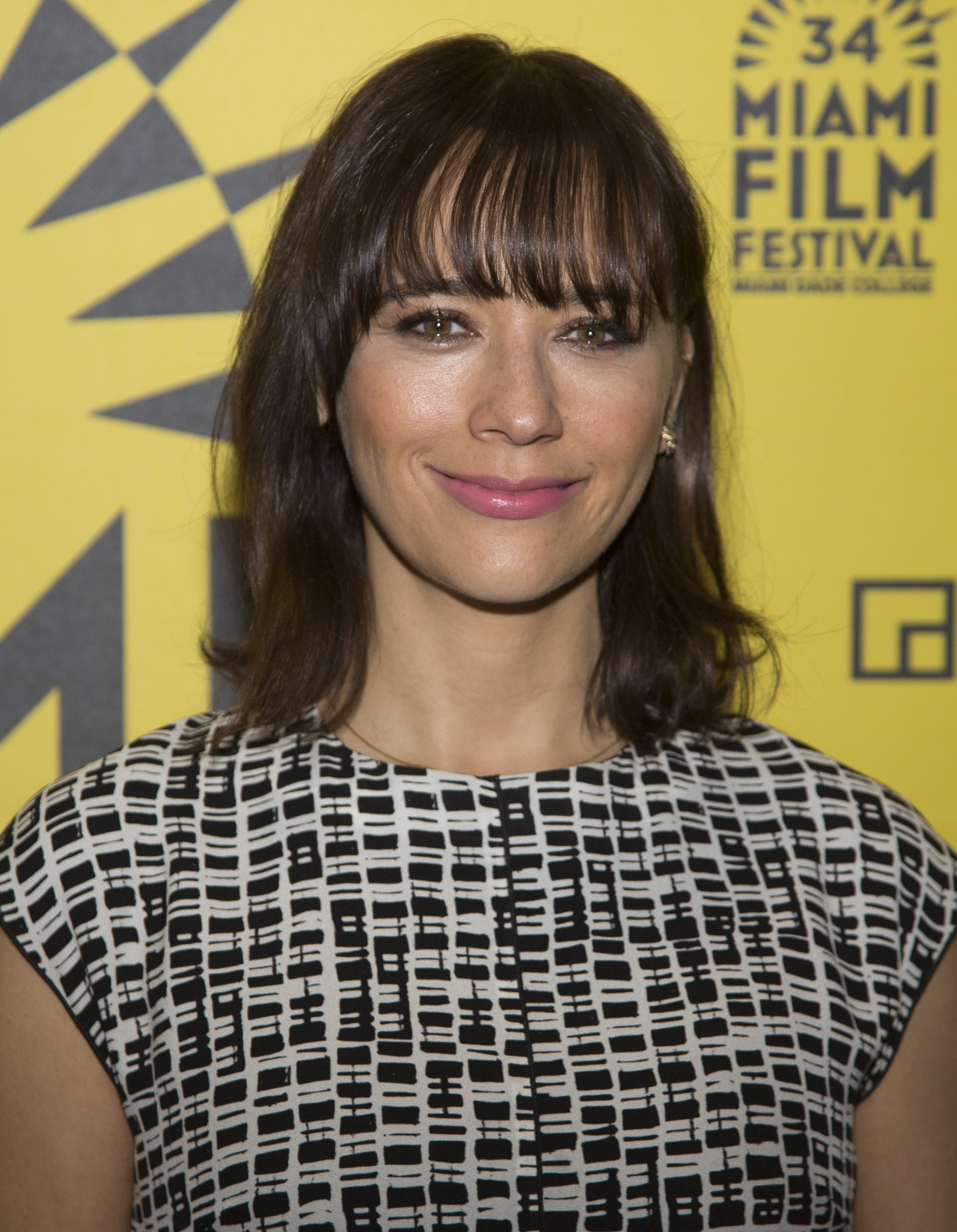
Rashida Jones

Ann Perkins (Rashida Jones), Leslie's best friend, is a nurse who eventually takes a part-time position with Pawnee's department of public health. Ann and Leslie meet after Ann requests at a town meeting that an abandoned construction pit be filled, and Leslie pushes to have it turned into a park. Even before getting her part-time Pawnee job, Ann often spent time at city hall and helped the parks department on their endeavors due to her friendship with Leslie. Ann was dating Andy Dwyer at the start of the show, but she broke up with him after the first season after learning Andy faked the severity of an injury so that Ann would pamper him. She started dating city planner Mark Brendanawicz, but they split up by the end of the second season. Ann briefly dated Chris Traeger until he broke up with her, leaving Ann emotionally distraught and prompting her to go on a string of dates with multiple men. The two got back together in the sixth season and Ann became pregnant. Shortly after, Ann and Chris moved to Ann Arbor, Michigan. She had a son, Oliver, on Galentine's Day.

=== Mark Brendanawicz ===
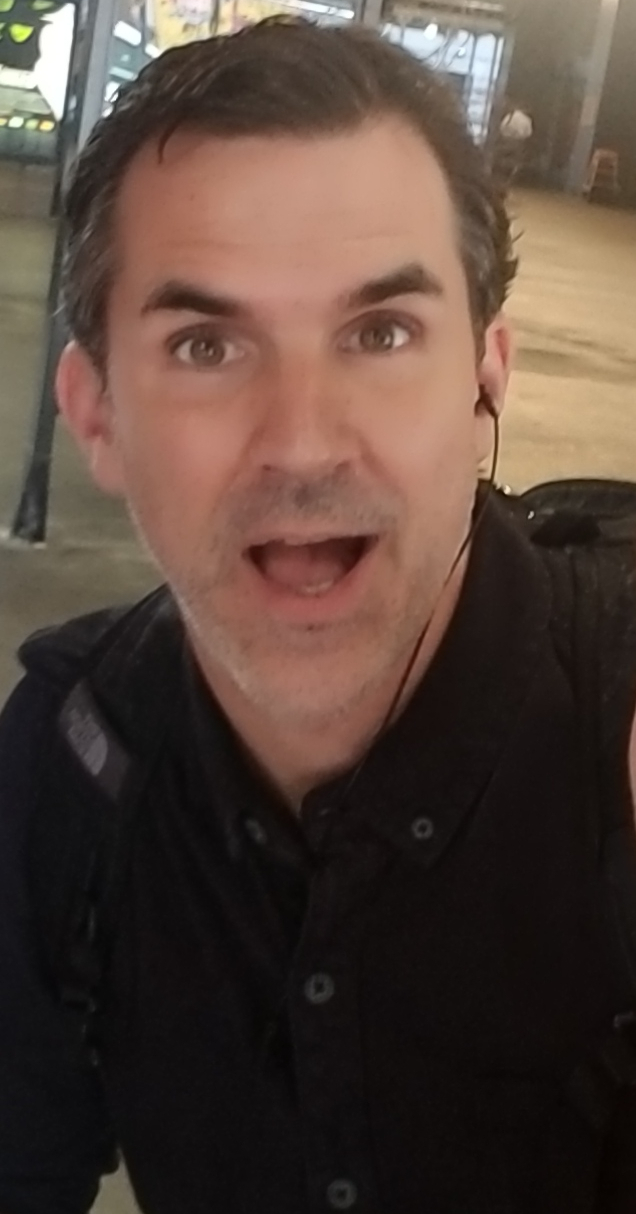
Paul Schneider

Mark Brendanawicz (Paul Schneider) was a Pawnee city planner who dated Ann Perkins for much of the second season. According to Aziz Ansari's character, Tom Haverford, "He's stuck it in some crazy chicks." At the start of the show, Mark was an unrequited love interest for Leslie Knope. The two had once had a one-night stand six years earlier and Leslie never got over him, although Mark did not return her affections. Jaded and disillusioned with his job due to government red tape, Mark often pragmatically insisted to Leslie that her ambitions to turn a construction pit into a park were unlikely to succeed. Nevertheless, he admired Leslie's unwavering optimism in the face of government ineffectiveness and tried to help her. In the first-season finale "Rock Show," a drunken Mark tried to kiss Leslie, but she rejected him and he accidentally falls into the pit. Although Mark is selfish and promiscuous with women at the start of the show, he becomes kinder when he starts dating Ann, and even plans to propose to her. After she broke up with him, Mark left his city hall position for a job in the private sector, marking Schneider's departure from the series. He did not appear in any episodes after Season 2, and the show pointedly made no references to him ever having been there at all, most notably in the episode where Ann Perkins left Pawnee and the storyline reviewed her many pre-marriage/pregnancy romances but erased Mark from that listing even though they dated for almost all of Season 2. The only remaining references are that the mural mock-up he made hangs in Ron's office through season 6, and a laptop bag he gives to Ann Perkins appears as a prop through season 5.

=== Tom Haverford ===
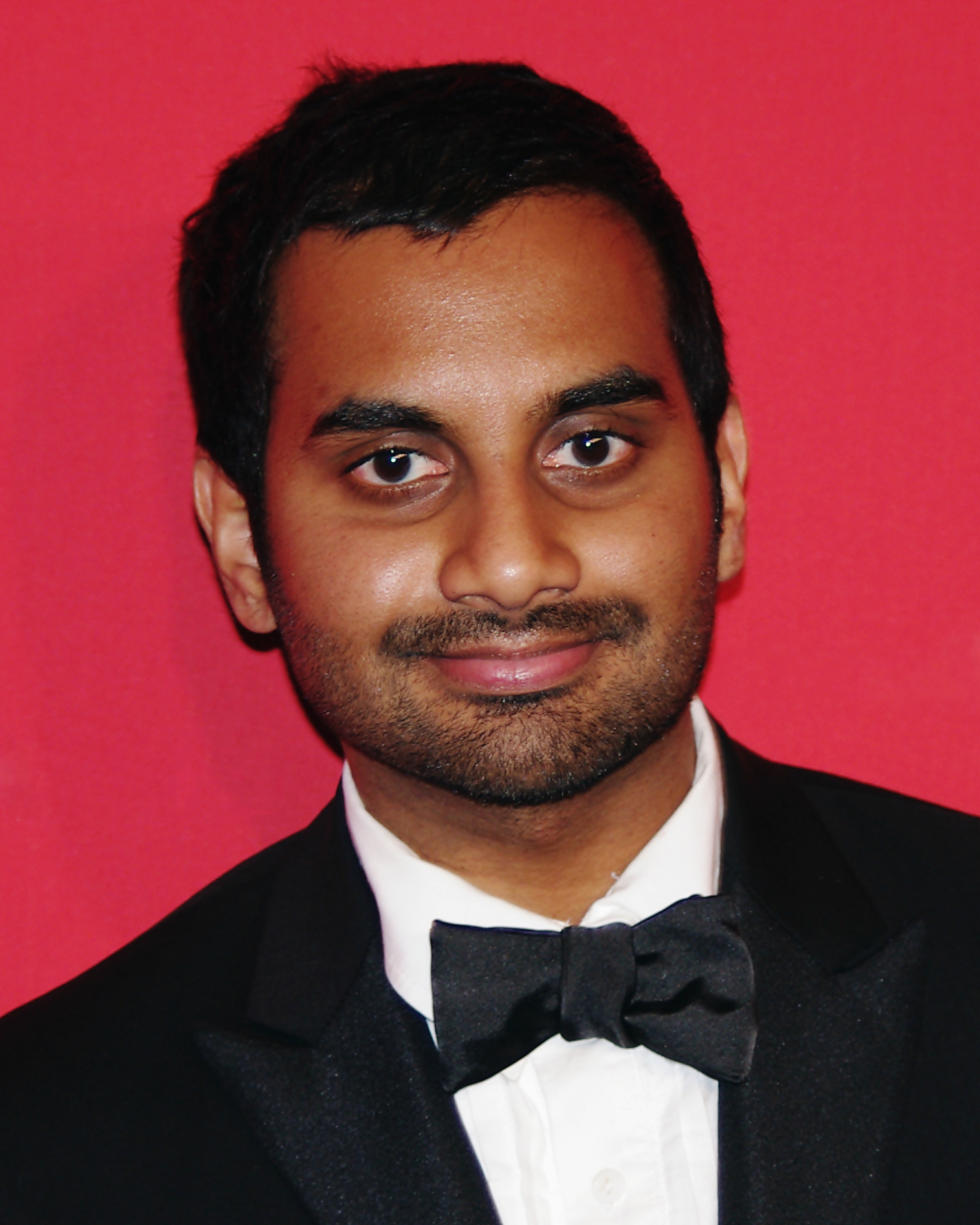
Aziz Ansari

Tom Haverford (Aziz Ansari), birth name Darwish Sabir Ishmael Gani, was an administrator in the parks department for most of the show, although he also became a minor investor in the Snake Hole Lounge and quit at the end of the third season to form an entertainment company with his friend Jean-Ralphio. Tom was Leslie's immediate subordinate on the parks department and the two would often work together on tasks. The sarcastic Tom seemed to care little for his mid-level government job and seldom showed any initiative or work ethic. This made him a favorite of Ron Swanson, who once quipped, "I like Tom. He doesn't do a lot of work around here. He shows zero initiative. He's not a team player. He's never one to go that extra mile. Tom is exactly what I'm looking for in a government employee." However, Tom harbors strong aspirations of becoming a media mogul, and sometimes used his parks department job to increase his stature and curry favors with others. Tom considers himself an extremely stylish dresser and smooth pickup artist, and believes he carries himself in the style of rapper Jay-Z. He constantly hits on women, particularly Ann Perkins, but usually to little success. Tom was married to an attractive surgeon named Wendy at the start of the show, but it is eventually revealed to be a green card marriage that amicably ends in divorce.

=== Ron Swanson ===
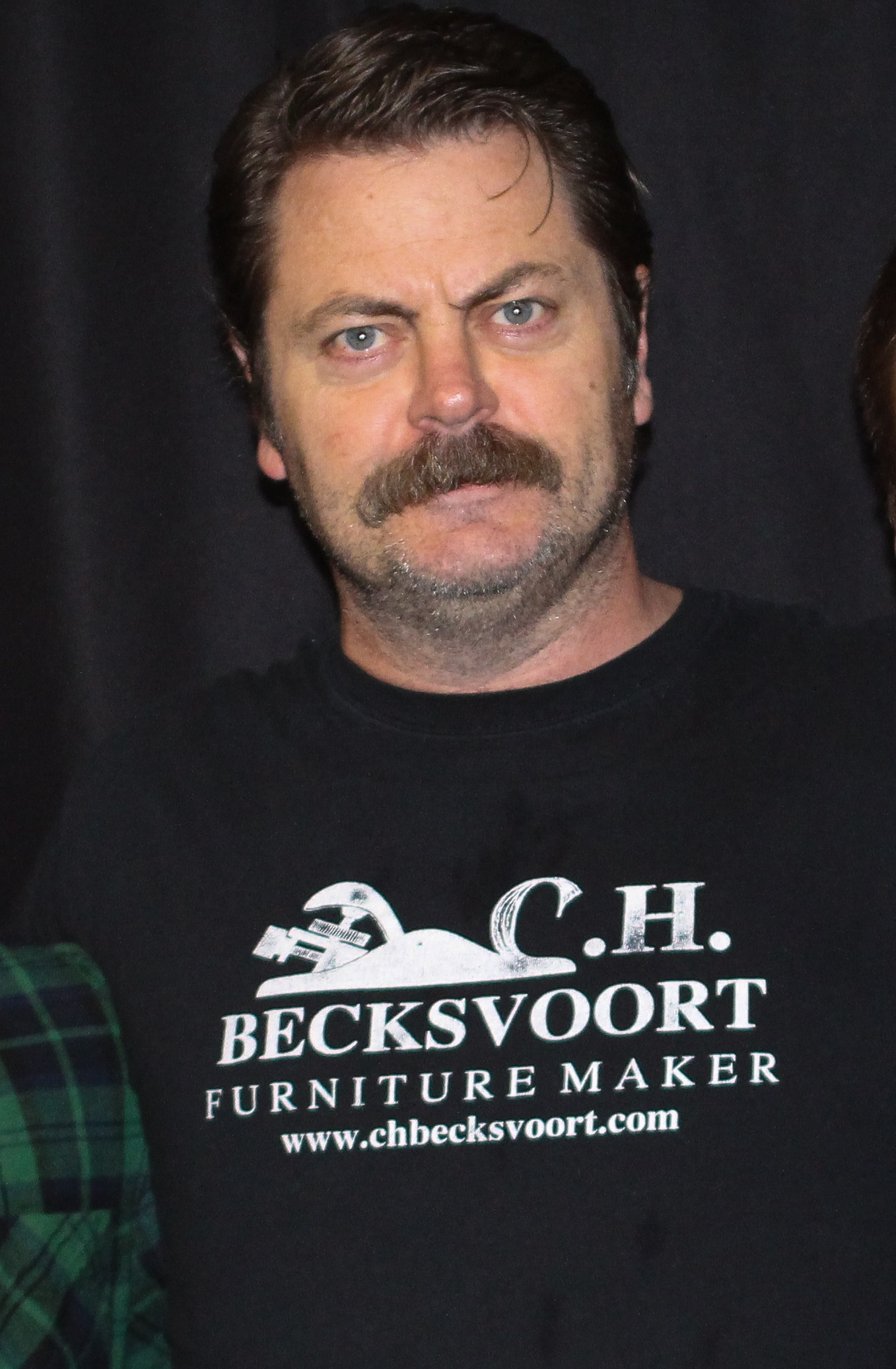
Nick Offerman

Ron Swanson (Nick Offerman) is the parks and recreation director, although he allows Leslie to do almost all the real work in the department. Despite working in a government job, Ron is a steadfast libertarian who believes in as little government as possible and feels the parks department should not even run or maintain parks. He advocates for program cuts wherever possible, actively works to make city hall less effective, and especially detests interacting with Pawnee taxpayers. Nevertheless, Ron has a deep respect for Leslie and genuinely cares about his fellow employees, despite his efforts to hide it. Ron has a deadpan, inexpressive personality, and loves meat, hunting and breakfast foods. He has two ex-wives, both named Tammy, both of whom he hates. Ron Swanson has been praised as the show's breakout character, (Note: Paste magazine writer Garrett Martin said, "Ron Effing Swanson might be the beloved breakout character, the Fonzie of the Parks department." A GQ article read, "Thanks to a noticeable creative resurgence in its second season, Parks & Recreation has become one of the funniest shows on TV. And Offerman's unabashedly weird Ron Swanson [is] a big part of that." Jonah Weiner of Slate.com called Ron "Parks and Recreation's secret weapon" who is vital to the show's improvement.) and some of his traits were based on elements of Offerman's real-life personality, like their shared affinity for woodworking and saxophone-playing.

=== April Ludgate ===
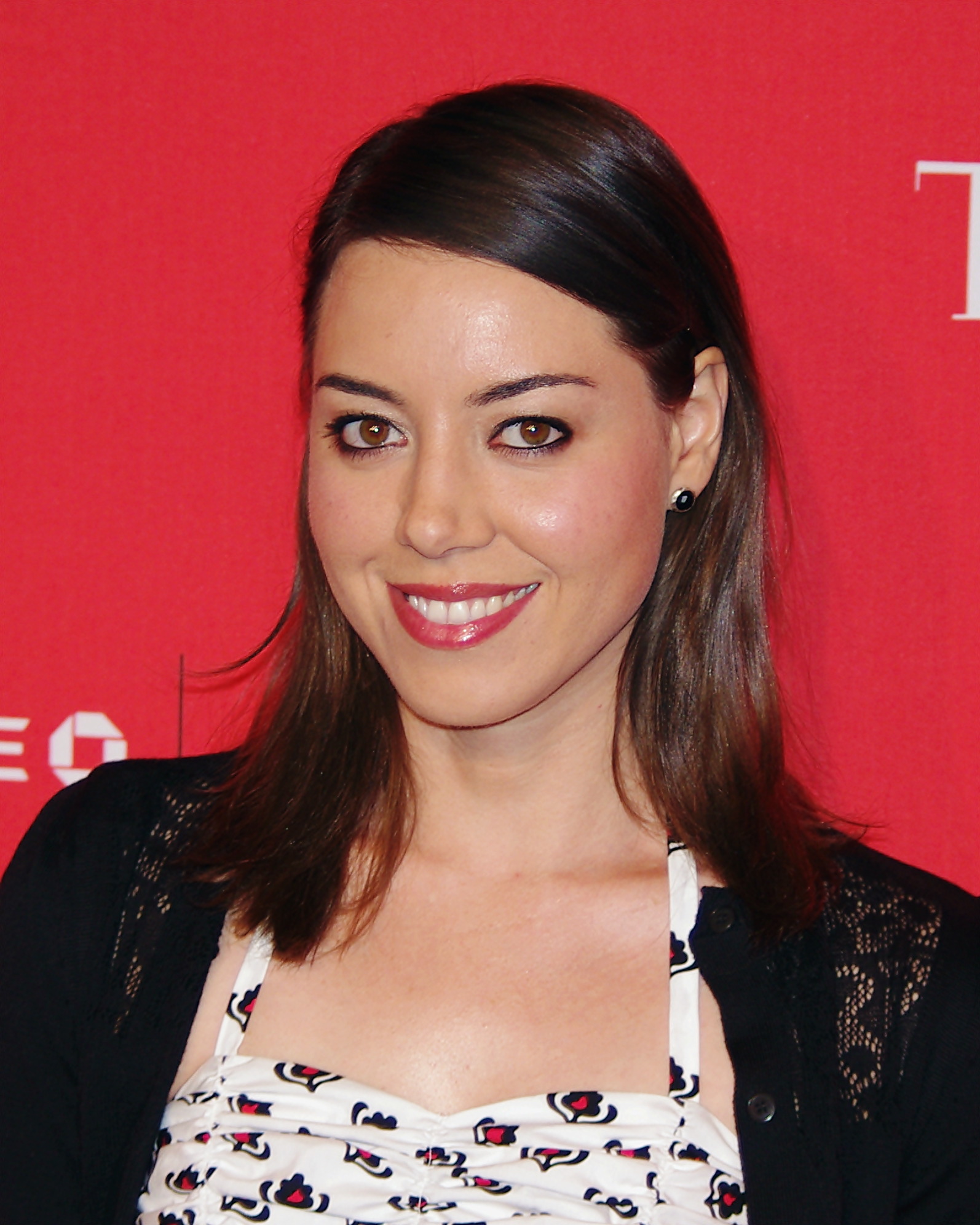
Aubrey Plaza

April Ludgate (Aubrey Plaza) is an extremely sarcastic, apathetic and goth-like college student who started the show working as an intern in the parks and recreation department, but is eventually hired as Ron Swanson's full-time assistant. She always speaks in a deadpan and uninterested tone of voice, often making dry comments or mocking those around her, and expresses little interest in her job. Nevertheless, she secretly has a deep appreciation for Leslie Knope. In contrast to April's personality, her parents are extremely positive and enthusiastic people. At the start of the show, April was dating her openly gay boyfriend, Derek, who was simultaneously dating his gay boyfriend, Ben. April and Derek eventually broke up, and April harbored a crush on Andy Dwyer for most of the second season. They started dating in the third season and, after a very short period, were married during an impromptu ceremony in the episode "Andy and April's Fancy Party." She also became the manager of Andy's band, Mouse Rat, previously known as Scarecrow Boat. When Pawnee's Animal Control division is threatened, April recommends that the Animal Control division should be absorbed into the Parks and Recreation division. She is put in charge as the deputy director of the animal control part of Parks and Recreation. With Ann's help, she applies and is accepted into veterinary school, which she declines to attend. Eventually she finds enjoyment in a job in Washington D.C. as a career placement counselor.

=== Andy Dwyer ===
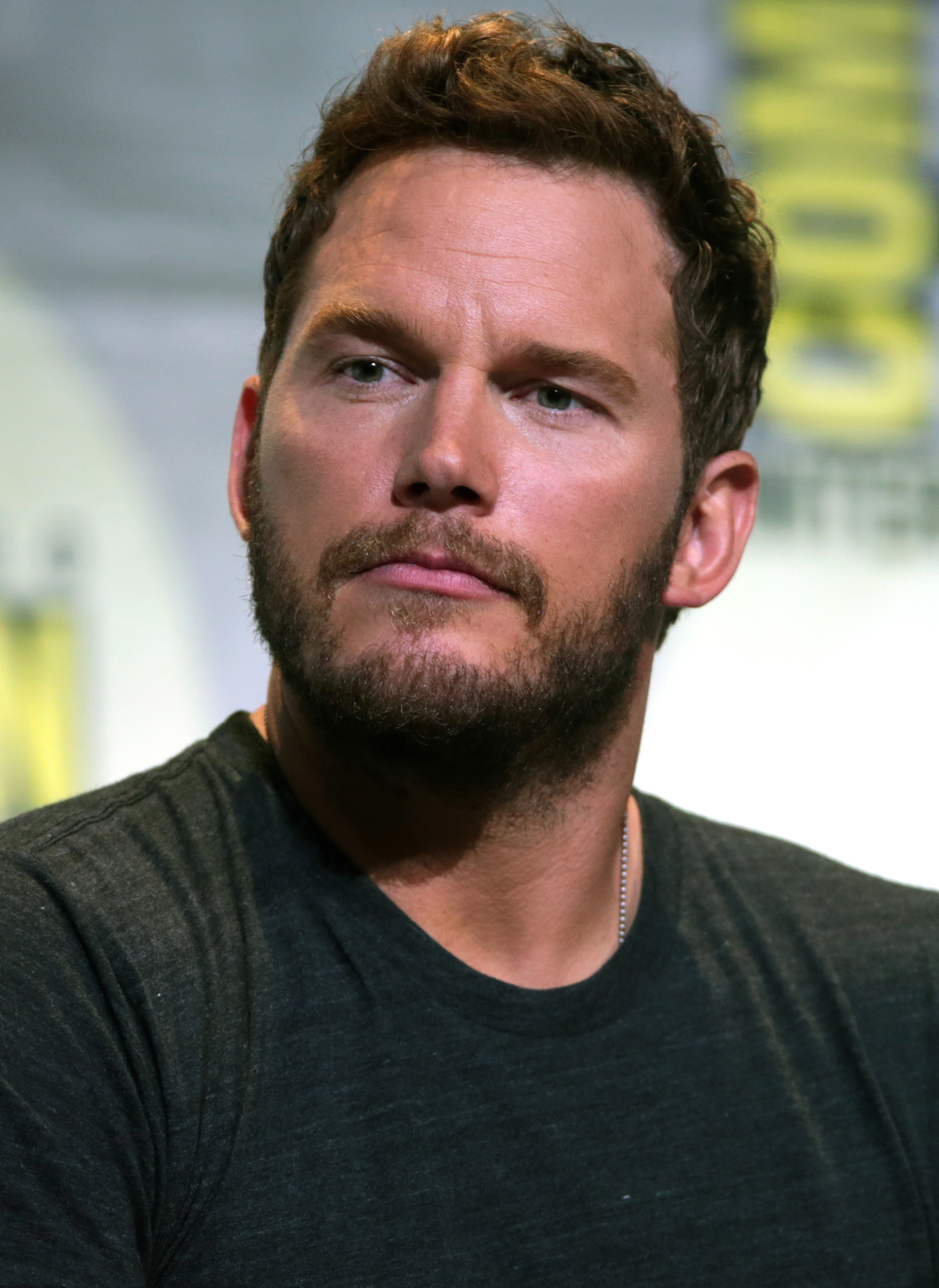
Chris Pratt

Andy Dwyer (Chris Pratt) is a goofy and dim-witted but lovable slacker who works as a shoeshiner at Pawnee city hall, and later works for Leslie in the Parks Department. He was dating Ann at the start of the show and, prior to the events of the first episode, he falls into a construction pit and breaks both his legs. This inadvertently caused Ann to meet Leslie after Ann attends a city hall meeting to demand the pit be filled in. Ann broke up with Andy after learning he faked the severity of his injuries so she would pamper him. The unemployed and homeless Andy initially lives in the pit, but became more self-sufficient when Leslie gets him the shoeshiner job. Andy started dating April Ludgate during the third season and, after a very short period, the two got married on a whim in the episode "Andy and April's Fancy Party." Andy is the lead singer and guitarist for his band, Mouse Rat. In the final season, he is shown hosting a children's TV show as the character "Johnny Karate." Andy was originally only meant to appear in the first season, but the Parks and Recreation producers liked Chris Pratt so much that, almost immediately after casting him, they decided to make him a regular cast member.

=== Ben Wyatt ===
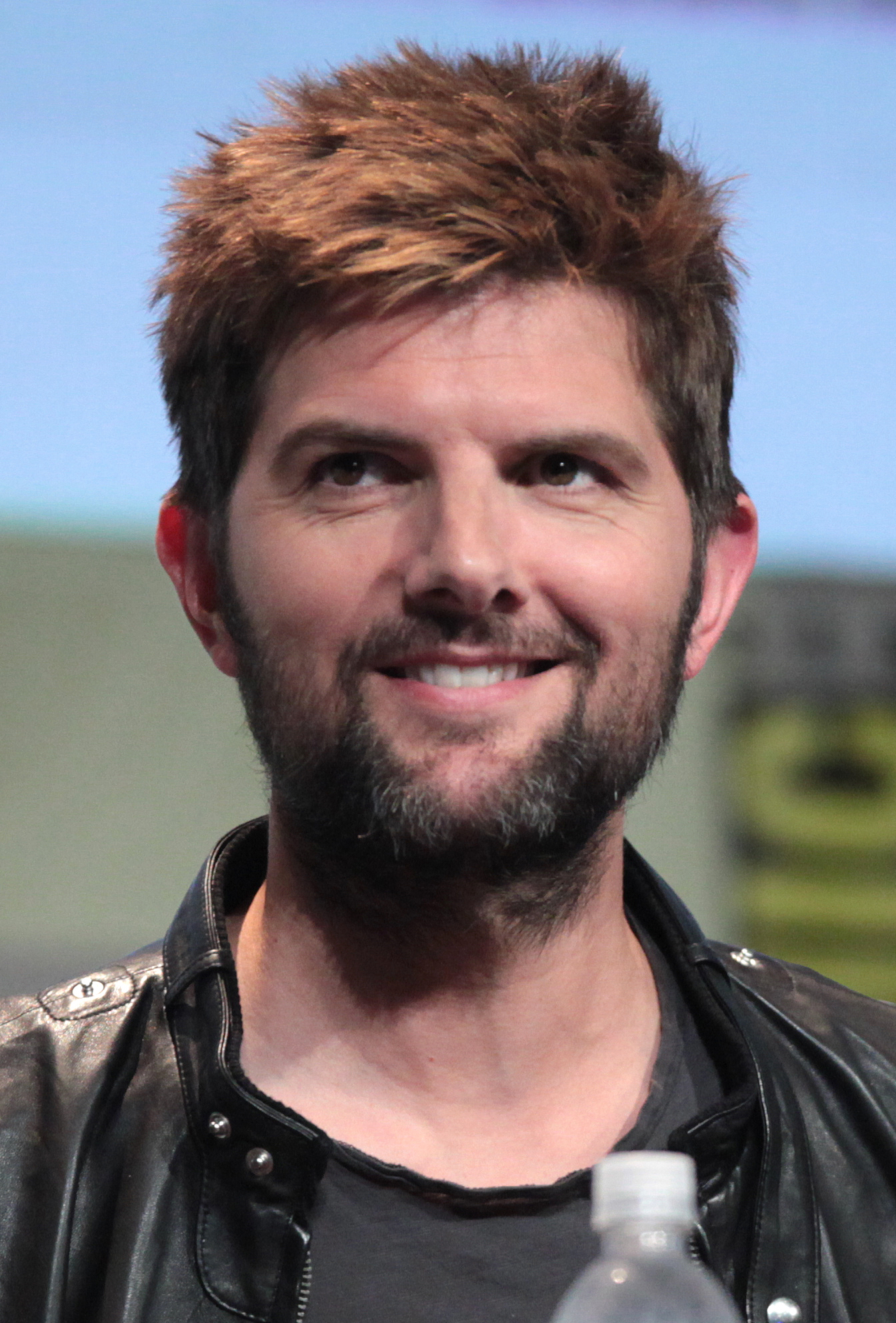
Adam Scott

Ben Wyatt (Adam Scott) is Leslie's husband. He joined the show in the penultimate second-season episode "The Master Plan" as an Indiana state auditor, but eventually took a job in Pawnee working with Chris. When he was 18, Ben was elected mayor of his Minnesota hometown, but was impeached after two months because he had no government experience and bankrupted the town. He became an auditor as an attempt to redeem himself and prove he can responsibly manage city government. At the start of the show, Ben contrasted Chris' cheery personality by bluntly describing the need for economic cuts in Pawnee, which caused conflicts between Leslie and Ben. While Ben never previously established roots in a town due to the constant traveling from his job, Ben gradually came to develop a love of Pawnee, which coincided with his developing romantic interest in Leslie herself. The two start dating in the episode "Road Trip," despite Chris' strict policy forbidding workplace romances. When he learns Leslie is running for office in the episode "I'm Leslie Knope," they break up for fear of jeopardizing Leslie's chance of winning the election in the event they could get caught and create a scandal. However, they decide to get back together in "Smallest Park," and later get married.

=== Chris Traeger ===
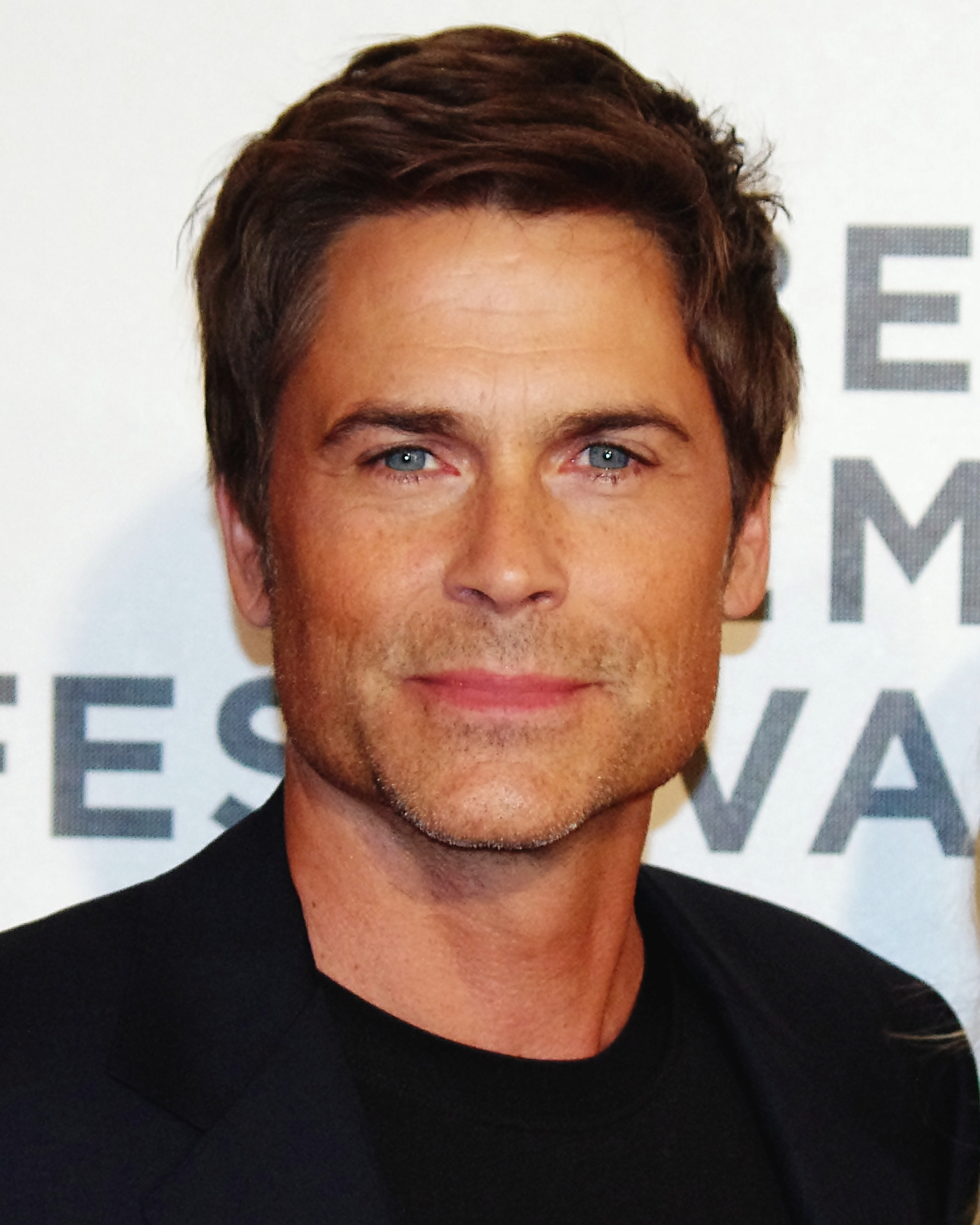
Rob Lowe

Chris Traeger (Rob Lowe) first appeared in "The Master Plan," along with Ben Wyatt, as an Indiana state auditor who visits Pawnee to help solve their crippling financial problems. This led to major budget cutbacks and, eventually, a three-month government shutdown. In the episode "Camping," he took a job as acting city manager after the previous manager, Paul Iaresco, suffered a heart attack. Chris is an extremely positive person who is always upbeat and energetic. Extremely health-conscious, he exercises constantly and eats only healthy foods, (Note: In the episode "Soulmates," Chris shops at the health food store called Grains And Simple, and enters into a cook-off with Ron Swanson to prove his lean meat turkey burgers will be better than Ron's red meat cheeseburgers. In "April and Andy's Fancy Party," instead of bringing a cake to a wedding, he brings a vegetable loaf sweetened with fruit reduction. In "Flu Season," Chris says he exercises so much he has only 2.8 percent body fat, and that he considers a 15 km run to be "light exercise." In "Freddy Spaghetti," it is revealed Chris runs 10 miles during his lunch break alone.) and hopes to be the first human being to live 150 years. He briefly dated Ann Perkins, but the two split up in the third season. Chris imposed a strict policy against workplace dating at city hall, which serves as a detriment to Leslie and Ben. Rob Lowe was originally expected to appear in only eight episodes as a guest star, but eventually signed on to remain on the show as a permanent cast member.

=== Jerry Gergich ===
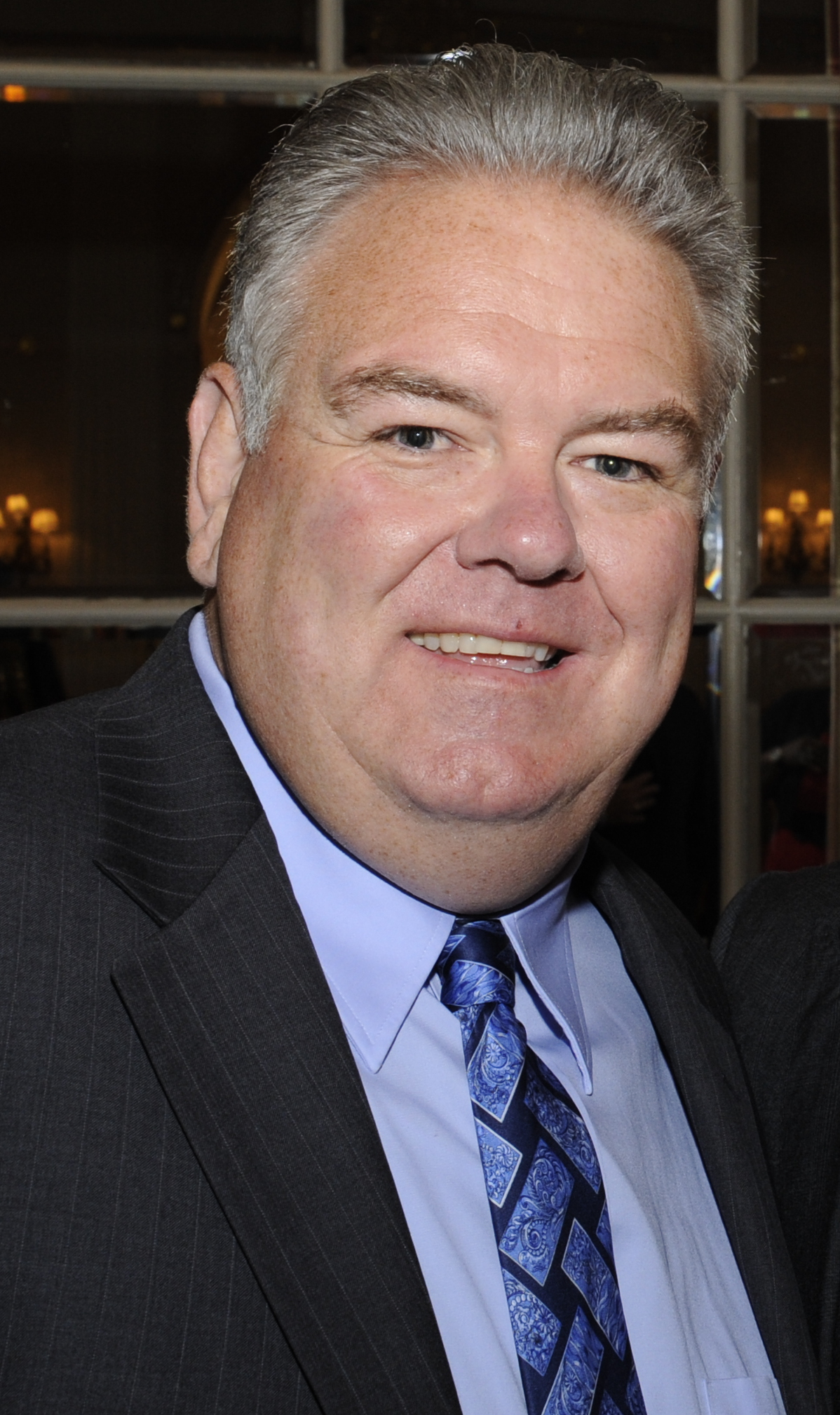
Jim O'Heir

Garry "Jerry"/"Larry"/"Terry"/"Gengurch" Gergich (Jim O'Heir) is a parks and recreation department employee who is regularly mocked and taunted by his co-workers. Jerry is clumsy, is overweight and often mangles his speech while speaking publicly. He is teased so badly that, after falling and dislocating his shoulder in the episode "Park Safety," he falsely claimed he was mugged just so his co-workers would not make fun of him. Despite their jokes at his expense, the parks department employees like Jerry, and Jerry himself claims not to mind the jokes because he is nearing retirement with a full pension. Jerry often demonstrates great artistic talent and is an excellent pianist and painter, although his talents are usually overlooked, ignored or even mocked by his colleagues as though they were character faults. Jerry's personality was not established until the second season, but the producers cast O'Heir at the start of the show because they liked the actor and decided they would develop the character later in the series. In an episode of season 4 during Leslie's trial for the relationship she had with Ben, Jerry reveals his real first name, Garry, while under oath. He then goes on to explain that he was accidentally called Jerry by a high-ranking employee of the city and thought it was rude to correct him. It was also revealed that he has a Leap Day birthday and is 64/16 years old. In contrast to his awkwardness at work, Jerry leads an idyllic family life with his gorgeous wife, Gayle (played by Christie Brinkley), and their children, as shown when he hosts a holiday party in the Season 5 episode "Ron and Diane." In season six, his coworkers take to permanently calling him Larry instead of Jerry. In a flash forward sequence in the season six finale, Jerry is shown working for Leslie at her new job three years in the future, with Leslie now calling him Terry. He is named mayor of Pawnee in the second to last episode of season 7. In flash forwards in the series finale, it is revealed that he was elected mayor multiple times before retiring and dying peacefully in his sleep on his 100th birthday.

=== Donna Meagle ===
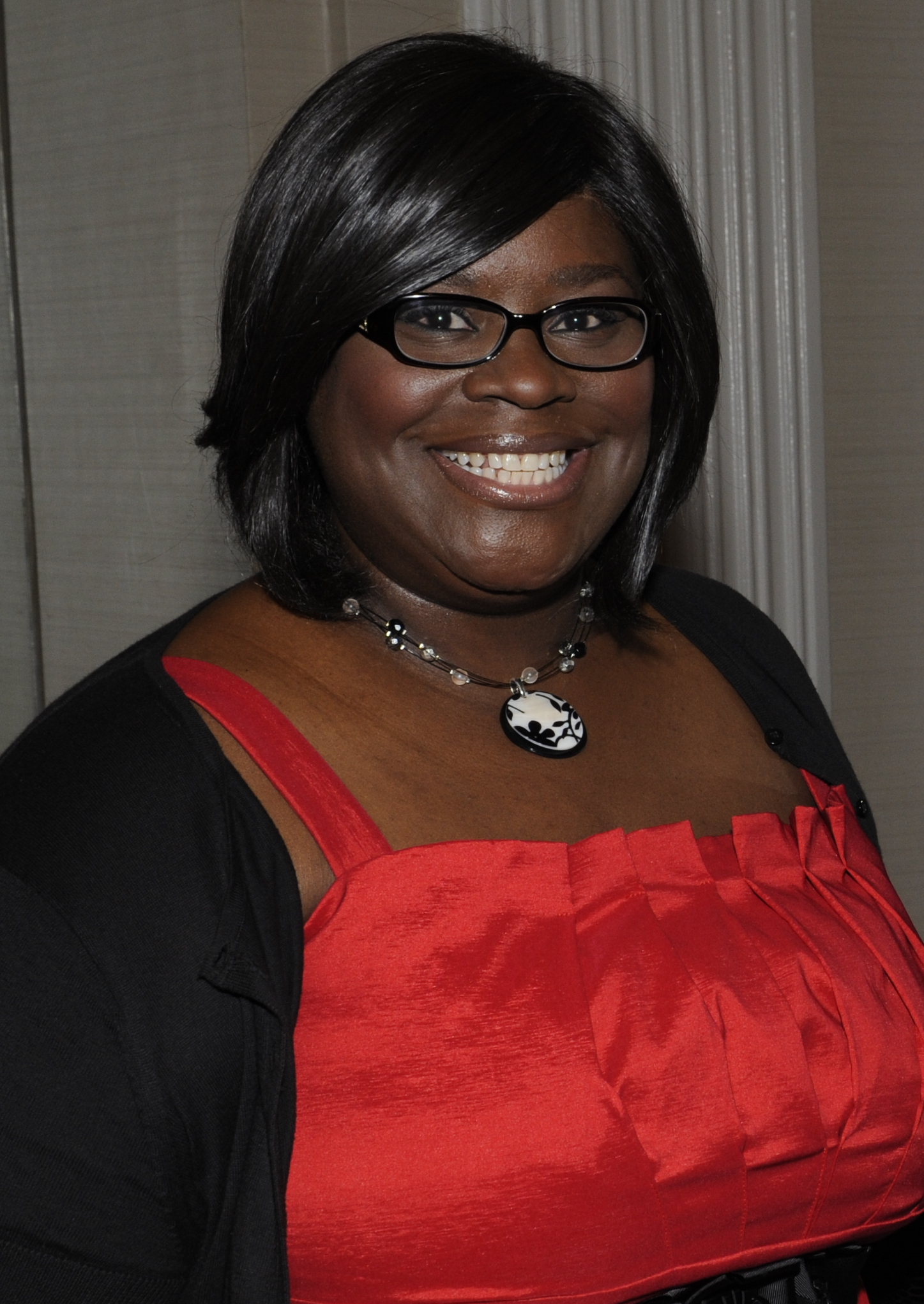
Retta

Donna Meagle (Retta) is an employee for the parks and recreation department. Confident and lively, she has been described by NBC as the "parks diva." Donna enjoys partying, and often takes two shots of alcohol at once without any problem. She can be extremely competitive, especially when it comes to dating, where she has an every woman for herself philosophy. Nevertheless, Donna helped Ann recover from her bad break-up with Chris by giving her advice and encouraging her to pursue rebound dates. Donna has worked at the parks department longer than Leslie, and is one of the few people who can speak sternly to Ron Swanson. She is the proud owner of a Mercedes, which she is extremely protective of and often brags about. As with Jerry Gergich, the personality for Donna was not established until the second season, but Retta was cast during the first season because the producers liked her, and they decided they would establish her character as the series progressed.

=== Craig Middlebrooks ===
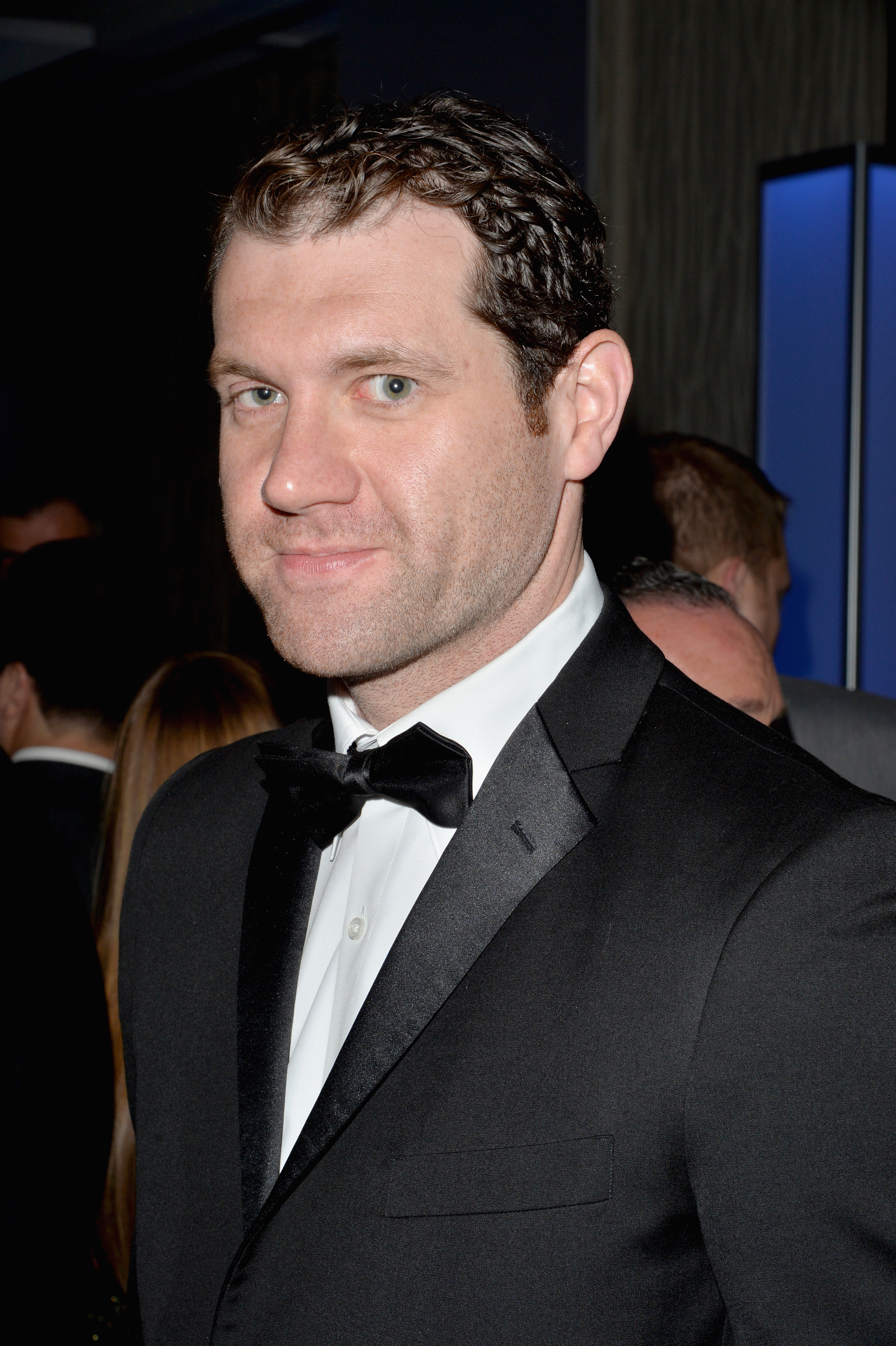
Billy Eichner

Craig Middlebrooks (Billy Eichner) is the former office manager of Eagleton's parks department, the equivalent of Donna's position in Pawnee. In the episode "Doppelgangers," he and other Eagleton employees were brought in to Pawnee's offices after the Pawnee–Eagleton city merger. Craig is the one former Eagleton Parks employee not laid off after the merger, and continues to work at the Pawnee offices under the title of "Associate Administrator." By 2017, he has replaced Ron Swanson as director of the Pawnee Parks department. Craig at first seemed to be the polar opposite to Donna's more laid-back personality (with layoffs imminent, Donna actually suggested to Leslie that Craig should have her job because he was much more passionate). The two of them bonded over their mutual love of the TV series Scandal. The overdramatic Craig often raises his voice to the point of shouting, and frequently blows things out of proportion, although he proves to be a highly efficient employee who is familiar with city politics and a strong negotiator. After recurring heavily during the show's sixth season, Eichner was promoted to a starring cast member in the seventh season, beginning with the fourth episode "Leslie and Ron."

== Family and friends of main characters ==
=== Marlene Griggs-Knope ===
Marlene Griggs-Knope (Pamela Reed) is Leslie's mother and a major political figure in Pawnee's school system. She is a shrewd and cunning politician who is willing to resort to unethical tactics to get her way. Although Leslie has very different standards, she nevertheless sees Marlene as a source of inspiration, and is extremely eager to impress her mother. Marlene has low expectations for her daughter's ability to succeed, but is ultimately supportive of her, as indicated in "Canvassing" when Marlene attended Leslie's public forum in support of her despite privately predicting it would be a "train wreck." In "The Banquet," Marlene encouraged Leslie to use scandalous information to blackmail a Pawnee zoning official into supporting Leslie's park project. In "The Bubble," Leslie secretly prepared her boyfriend Ben for a meeting with Marlene with the hopes her mother would be impressed with him. The plan backfired, however, when Marlene became attracted to Ben and made a pass at him.

Though not seen after early in season 5, Marlene is still referenced from time to time. In particular, in season 7 it is mentioned on several occasions that she is babysitting Leslie and Ben's triplets (who are also her grandchildren.)

=== Wendy Haverford ===
Wendy Haverford (Jama Williamson) starts the first season as the wife of Tom Haverford, although they are later revealed to have a green card marriage. Wendy came to Pawnee from Ottawa, Canada and married Tom so she could remain in the country. Introduced in the first-season finale "Rock Band," Wendy is an attractive, outgoing and wealthy pediatric surgeon, and various characters are surprised she is married to Tom, who often brags about her good looks and impressive job. When the parks department employees hold a contest in "Practice Date" to see who can find out the dirtiest secret about their colleagues, Ron learns the real reason for the marriage, but keeps it a secret at Tom's request.

In "Tom's Divorce," Wendy is granted permanent residence in the United States, and immediately begins planning for a divorce. Tom outwardly claims he is fine with it, but secretly wishes for the marriage to continue, as he has developed romantic feelings for Wendy. When Ron asks him if he can ask Wendy out after the divorce, Tom is heartbroken, despite giving Ron his blessing. In "Galentine's Day," Tom confesses his true feelings to Wendy, but she rejects him, prompting an angry Tom to sue her for alimony in the hope of blackmailing her into being with him; however, he soon recognizes how unreasonable this is, and apologizes to Wendy. The divorce goes smoothly, and the two part on good terms.

In the second-season finale, "Freddy Spaghetti," a horrified Tom learns that Wendy and Ron are indeed dating. Although the pairing causes significant tension between Ron and Tom, Ron proves so happy in his relationship with Wendy that it allows him to resist the temptations of his horrible ex-wife Tammy II. However, in "Ron & Tammy: Part Two," Ron and Wendy break up after she decides to return to Canada to take care of her ailing parents.

=== Dave Sanderson ===
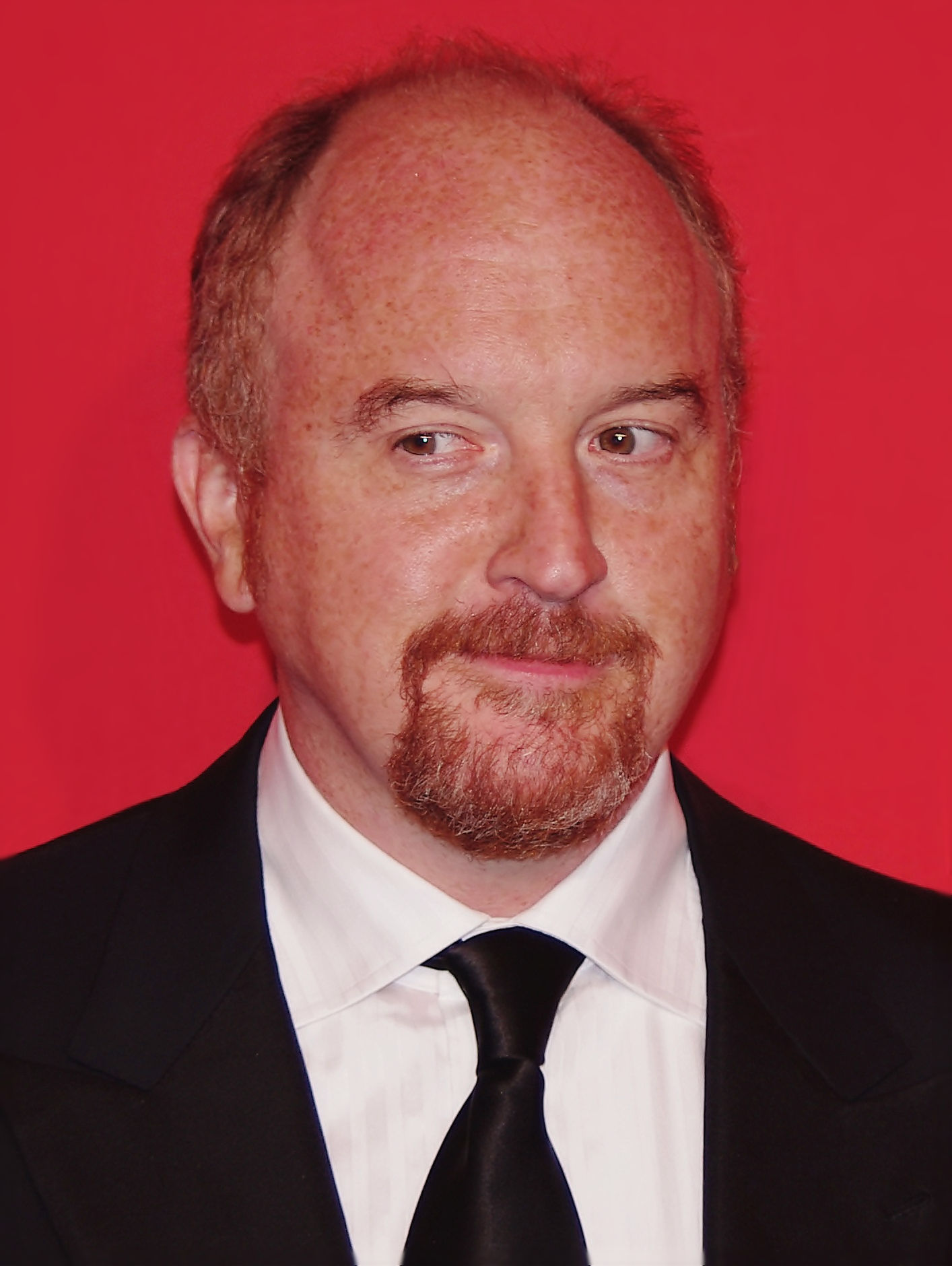
Stand-up comedian Louis C.K. guest starred as Pawnee police Sergeant Dave Sanderson.

Dave Sanderson (Louis C.K.) is a former boyfriend of Leslie Knope and ex-police sergeant in Pawnee. Socially awkward, Dave always speaks in an extremely deadpan and technical tone of voice, but has a sweet personality despite his serious and sometimes gruff exterior, with one Pawnee cop telling Ben that Dave had been the crankiest member of the force until he met Leslie. He first appears in "The Stakeout," where he arrested Tom after finding him suspiciously lingering in a parked van. Leslie angrily demanded that Dave set Tom free, and Dave immediately found Leslie attractive. He asked her on a date in "Beauty Pageant" and she accepted, although she initially hesitated when Dave failed to recognize photos of major female political figures hanging in Leslie's office. Nervous about the upcoming first date, Leslie became drunk in "Practice Date" and visited Dave's house in the middle of the night, acting foolish until Dave brought her home. Leslie was humiliated, but Dave comforted her the next day and they continued dating. In "Greg Pikitis," Dave helped Leslie monitor her nemesis, high school student Greg Pikitis, on Halloween night and ultimately helped catch him in the middle of committing a prank. Dave made what seemed to be his final appearance in "Christmas Scandal," when he told Leslie he is in the United States Army Reserve and has been called for maintenance work in San Diego. He invited Leslie to move there with him, but she insisted she could not leave her home of Pawnee, so they amicably split up. In "Dave Returns," Dave comes back to Pawnee for the retirement party of the current police chief. On a whim, Leslie invites Dave out to dinner with her and Ben and while Ben is in the bathroom, Dave reveals to Leslie that he still has feelings for her. He then handcuffed Ben in the bathroom, but Ben had access to his cell phone and called Leslie, who then sat down for a friendly but firm chat with Dave where she said she was in love with Ben. Dave apologized for his behavior and accepted the situation, being glad to know that Leslie is happy. At the end of the episode, he finally convinced Ben to use the bathroom (Ben has a fear of cops) in the form of a command, which Ben gratefully accepts.

=== Derek and Ben ===
Derek (Blake Lee) is April Ludgate's openly bisexual ex-boyfriend, who himself had a gay boyfriend named Ben (Josh Duvendeck) while dating her. Like April, both Derek and Ben are cynical and sarcastic, often mocking others around them. The two first appear together in "Pawnee Zoo," where they and April congratulate Leslie for organizing a publicity stunt that married two homosexual penguins at the local zoo. In "Sweetums," they begin to notice April is spending more time with Andy Dwyer, and they mock his personality, upsetting and embarrassing April. In "Galentine's Day," Derek and Ben attend a senior citizen dance party, where they mock the seniors. Tired of their constantly sarcastic behavior, and growing more romantically interested in Andy, April breaks up with them. Derek and Ben reappear again, in the episode "Andy and April's Fancy Party," making cameos as flower-men at Andy's and April's wedding.

=== Dr. Harris ===
Dr. Harris (Cooper Thornton) is a doctor who works at the hospital with Ann Perkins. He has an extremely sarcastic personality and responds to everything in a deadpan manner. He first appeared in the first-season finale "Rock Show," where he tended to Andy Dwyer, who broke his legs falling into a construction pit. He appeared again in "Greg Pikitis," where he attended Ann's Halloween party dressed as a doctor. When the party proved boring, Dr. Harris left early and took the bottle of wine he brought to Ann's party because no one drank it. Dr. Harris tended to Andy again in "Freddy Spaghetti," after Andy was struck by a car while riding his motorcycle. When Andy asked whether Dr. Harris can have him fully healed in the next 10 minutes, the doctor sarcastically responded, "Sure, I'll just advance medical science 30 years." He also appeared in the third-season finale "Li'l Sebastian," where he treated Chris Traeger for a case of tendinitis. Chris responded to Dr. Harris' sarcasm by declaring him "literally the meanest person I have ever met." Ann considered him as a potential sperm donor when she decided to become pregnant.

=== Jean-Ralphio Saperstein ===
Jean-Ralphio Saperstein (Ben Schwartz) is the idiotic and cocky friend of Tom Haverford who, like Tom himself, fancies himself a pickup artist and baller, although he is looked upon with contempt by most people around him except Tom. He tries to dress stylishly, makes up and raps spontaneous rhymes and often speaks in slang terms such as variations of the suffix -izzle as popularized by rapper Snoop Dogg. Jean-Ralphio is first introduced in "The Set Up," when Tom brought him in for an interview to be Ron Swanson's new assistant; he was quickly rejected. Jean-Ralphio contributed $5,000 when Tom was seeking a $10,000 investment in the Snakehole Lounge nightclub. In the third-season finale, "Li'l Sebastian," Tom quit his city hall job to form an entertainment company with Jean-Ralphio called Entertainment 720. The role of Jean-Ralphio was created specifically for Schwartz because the Parks and Recreation producers liked the actor so much.

=== Justin Anderson ===
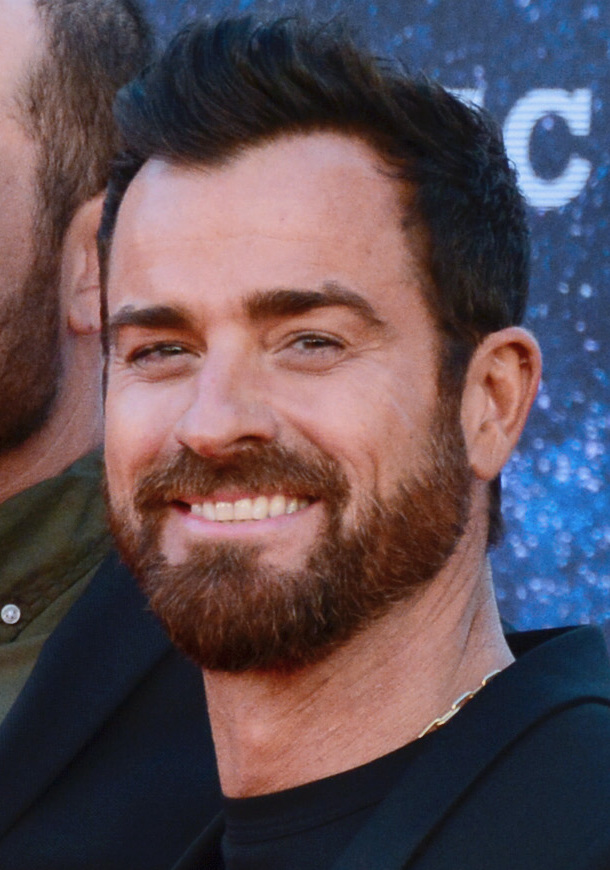
Justin Theroux portrayed lawyer Justin Anderson, a love interest for Leslie Knope.

Justin Anderson (Justin Theroux) is a lawyer and long-time friend of Ann who briefly dated Leslie. He is very charming, regularly travels around the world and has done many extravagant things, such as mountain climbing. He loves telling entertaining stories, and sometimes seems less interested in the people around him than he is in listening to and learning new stories. Justin and Ann never dated, but she seems to secretly harbor romantic feelings for him, something that caused difficulties between Ann and Andy when they were dating. Justin first appears in "The Set Up," when he provided legal advice to the Parks and Recreation department, and Leslie developed a romantic interest in him. She asks Ann to set them up, but she hesitated to do so, prompting Mark to accuse her of still having feelings for Justin. Ann finally sets up a date, and the two start dating regularly. Impressed by Justin's worldliness, Leslie was so determined to impress him with a house party that, in "Leslie's House," she abused her government power by recruiting town employees to provide entertainment. Justin made his final appearance in "Galentine's Day," when Justin and Leslie tried to find Frank Beckerson, the long-lost love of Leslie's mother Marlene, and reunite the two. Upon finding him, Leslie quickly realized Frank is too strange and tried to call the plan off, but Justin insisted on going through with it. After the evening ends disastrously, Ron points out to Leslie that Justin is a selfish person who only cares about getting more stories, so she breaks up with him. Tom, who strongly admired Justin's hipness and idolized him, became extremely disappointed by the break-up and reacted like a child whose parents are divorcing.

=== Li'l Sebastian ===
Li'l Sebastian was a miniature horse, who debuted as an instant sensation at the Pawnee Harvest Festival in 1987. That week he was the eighth most photographed item in the United States. He also received an honorary degree from Notre Dame. Leslie brings him back for the Harvest Festival in season three, although he was much older and had many ailments, including cataracts, diabetes, and arthritis. His return brought excitement and joy to all of Pawnee, except for Ben, who didn't understand what made him so special. In the season three finale, Li'l Sebastian dies, and everyone is devastated (except for Ben, who still doesn't understand). Leslie used Tom's company, Entertainment 720, to give Li'l Sebastian a funeral. Andy then writes the song "5000 Candles in the Wind" to honor Li'l Sebastian. The real-life University of Notre Dame dedicated a commemorative plaque in the DeBartolo Performing Arts Center to Li'l Sebastian.

=== Linda Lonegan ===
Professor Linda Lonegan (Danielle Bisutti) was Andy's Women's Studies professor. She first appeared in Smallest Park, where she made quite an impression on Andy, April, and particularly Ron. Ron even stated "If that woman wasn't so violently opposed to marriage, I'd propose to her." When Andy finished the course, Linda went to dinner with them to celebrate, where April tried to set her up with Chris. Although Linda seemed to have a connection with Chris, she went home with Ron, revealing her attraction to him, for the entire night.

=== Lucy Santo Domingo ===
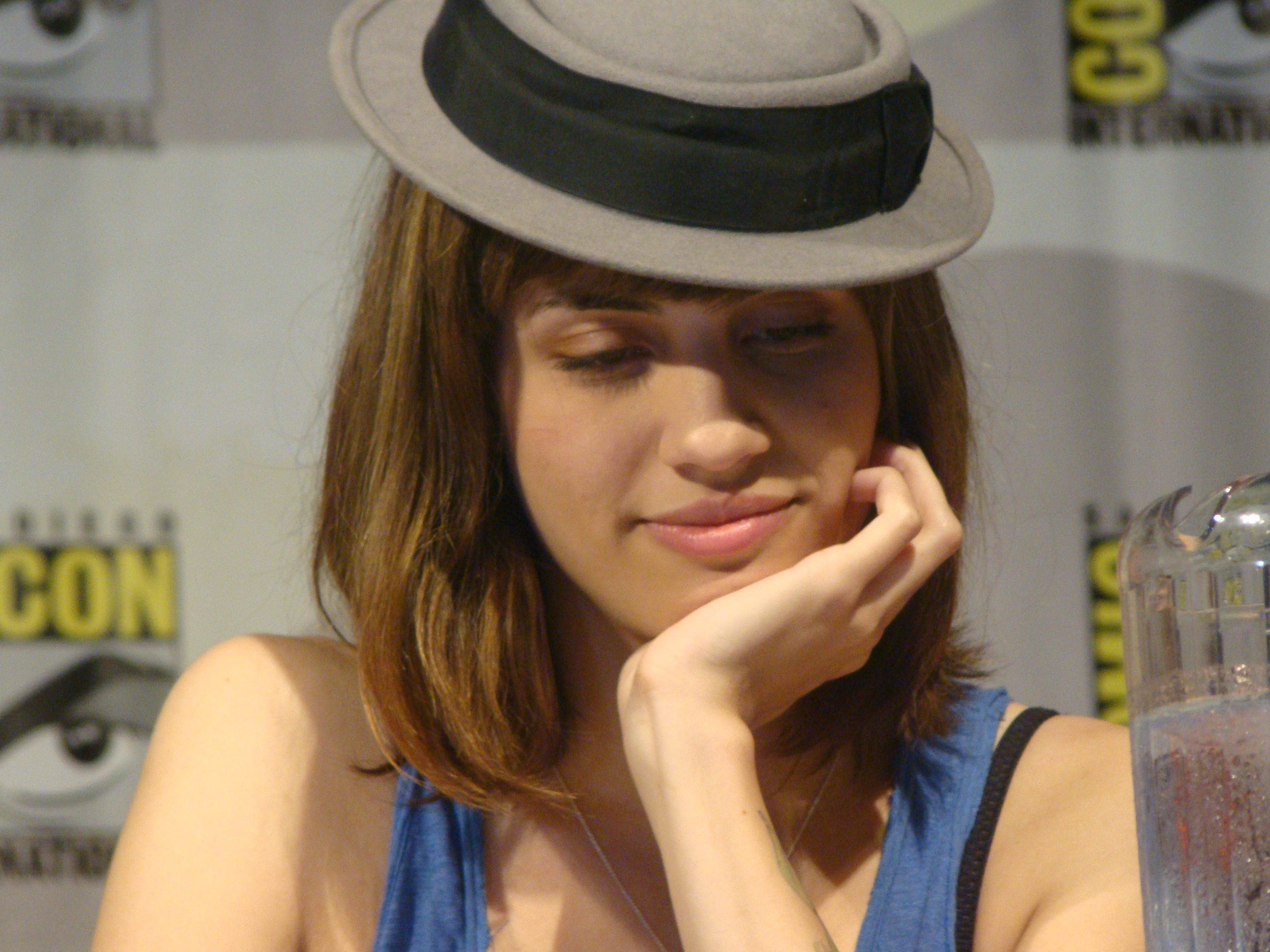
Natalie Morales portrayed Lucy Santo Domingo, the on-off girlfriend and eventual fiancée of Tom Haverford

Lucy Santo Domingo (Natalie Morales) is the on-off girlfriend and eventual fiancée of Tom Haverford. Lucy first appears as a bartender in the Snakehole Lounge, and meets Tom after he comes to the bar to settle his tab from the night before, when he unsuccessfully attempted to pick up several girls by buying drinks for them. Rather than trying to impress her in the same way as the other girls, Tom simply acts like himself; the two end up hitting it off and soon begin dating. Lucy is intelligent and funny, and freely accepts Tom's immaturity and inappropriate humor; she jokingly claims to be attracted to him because, "You're cute and you're small enough for me to throw you around."

Lucy quickly realizes Tom isn't over his divorce from his ex-wife Wendy, noticing how upset he is when Ron starts dating her. She breaks up with him in "Time Capsule," but tells him to call her if he ever accepts that Wendy has moved on. In "End of the World," Jean-Ralphio invites Lucy to his and Tom's "best party of all time," much to Tom's pleasure and Jean-Ralphio's disappointment, as he had planned to pursue Lucy himself. Lucy and Tom have a good time together, and before she leaves the next morning, they share a kiss, hinting at the possibility of reviving their relationship.

In Season 7, Lucy contacts Tom after the success of his restaurant, and his feelings for her resurface. He takes a drunken trip with Andy to her new job in Chicago, but instead of asking her out, he panics and offers her a job instead. Lucy accepts and moves back to Pawnee, but Tom is unwilling to make a move, as she is still with her boyfriend from Chicago. However, they soon break up, and Tom works up the courage to ask her to go with him to Donna's wedding. He quickly realizes he wants to marry Lucy, causing some awkwardness when Ron informs her of Tom's feelings; however, they work past it, and become engaged in "Two Funerals." The season finale reveals Lucy is still with Tom in 2019, sticking with him through yet another failed business venture ahead of his successful novel.

=== Ludgate family ===
April Ludgate's parents, Larry (John Ellison Conlee) and Rita (Terri Hoyos) are, in contrast to April's sarcastic and apathetic personality, extremely enthusiastic and positive people, affectionally calling their daughter “Zuzu.” Rita is from Puerto Rico, which April sardonically claims is what makes herself so "lively and colorful," while Larry bears more than a passing resemblance to Ron Swanson; otherwise however, Larry and Rita represent the archetypical Midwesterner couple. Their other daughter and April's younger sister, Natalie (Minni Jo Mazzola), is much more like April in personality: she is sullen, dismissive of others and seemingly uninterested in everything around her. The Ludgate family is first introduced in "94 Meetings," when Ron meets them after coming to the Ludgate home to speak with April. Larry and Rita are extremely pleased to meet him, and April later reveals Rita is a big fan of Ron's secret saxophonist alter ego, Duke Silver. The Ludgates also attend April and Andy's surprise wedding ceremony in "Andy and April's Fancy Party," where they voice their approval of the marriage. Natalie gives an unsentimental and indifferent speech about her sister during the reception, calling April "lame" but Andy "sort of cool," but her speech is seemingly moving enough for April to be reduced to tears and hug Natalie.

=== Orin ===
Orin (Eric Isenhower) is an intense and creepy friend of April Ludgate. He seldom speaks and often stares silently at people, making them feel awkward or even afraid. Orin was originally mentioned in a throw-away joke in "Time Capsule," but Parks and Recreation screenwriter Katie Dippold liked the idea of the character so much that she worked him into her script for "Andy and April's Fancy Party." He first appears in "April and Andy's Fancy Party," where he makes Ben feel uncomfortable during the wedding reception; at one point Ben says to him, "No, Orin, I don't know how I'm going to die. Wait, are you asking me or telling me?" At that same party, Orin speaks to Chris, but Chris is so positively-minded that he overwhelms him. Orin reappears at an art show at "Jerry's Painting," where he stands silently and motionlessly next to his exhibit: a completely blank canvas. When Leslie has everyone bring a potential date for Ann to a Valentine's Day dance, April (who doesn't like Ann) brings Orin; Leslie proceeds to insult Orin and assure him she means every word of it, before lambasting April for bringing such an unpleasant and unlikable person to a romantic dance (April later makes amends by setting up Ann with Tom Haverford). This marked the first time someone on the show directly let Orin know they didn't like him. When he applies for the job of Animal Control director in Season 5, his resume contains one word: his name, in regular font. Leslie instantly tells him to go away, and when April asks how he is qualified to work in animal control, and he responds, "I studied zoology in college. And I can control animals with my mind," to which Leslie curtly says he will not be hired and repeats that he needs to get lost, which he does. He makes two brief appearances in Season 6: he appears in "Ann and Chris" dressed up as the Easter Bunny at Ann and Chris's going away party, and pretends to be April's mom when Andy picks her up to go to the senior prom in "Prom."

=== Tammy Swanson (Tammy I) ===
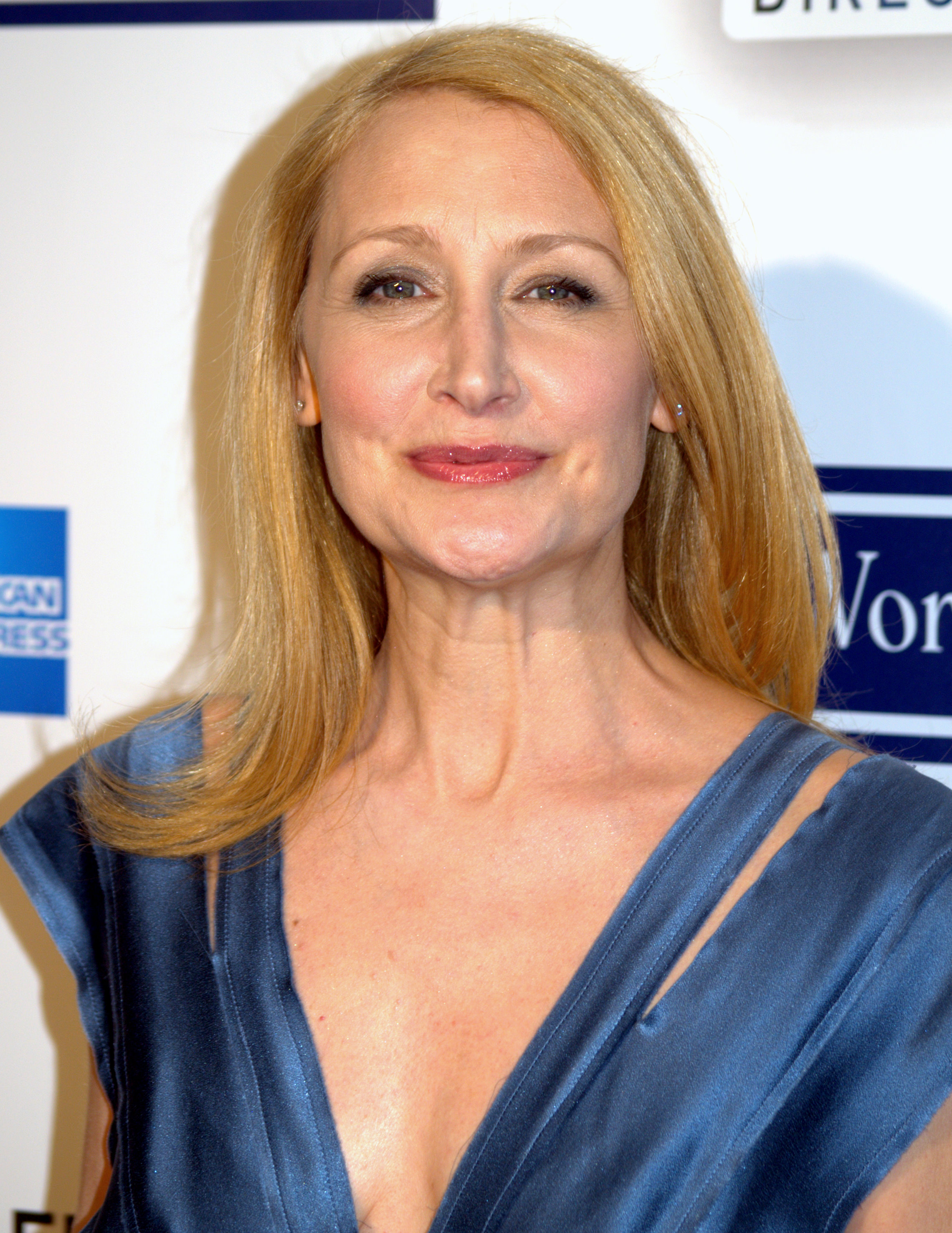
Patricia Clarkson

Tammy Swanson (Patricia Clarkson) is the first ex-wife of Ron Swanson. Ron has been married to two different women, both named Tammy, and he hates and fears both of them. Ron explains that Tammy I was present throughout most of his young life: she witnessed his birth, was his Sunday School teacher, and even took his virginity. Tammy I returns as an IRS agent who arrives at the end of the third season (although she doesn't appear physically until the fourth-season premiere) to audit Ron. Both Ron and his second wife named Tammy panic at the news of her arrival, and Ron initially goes into hiding before deciding to come back and face her. Leslie then enlists Ron's eccentric mother (also coincidentally named Tammy) in a drinking contest to drive Tammy I away once and for all. Since Tammy I's claim she was auditing Ron was a lie designed to let her search for his hidden gold, she ends up leaving with nothing, as Ron deliberately puts a tiny amount of gold out as a decoy, being happy to sacrifice it in order to get rid of Tammy I.

=== Tammy Swanson (Tammy II) ===
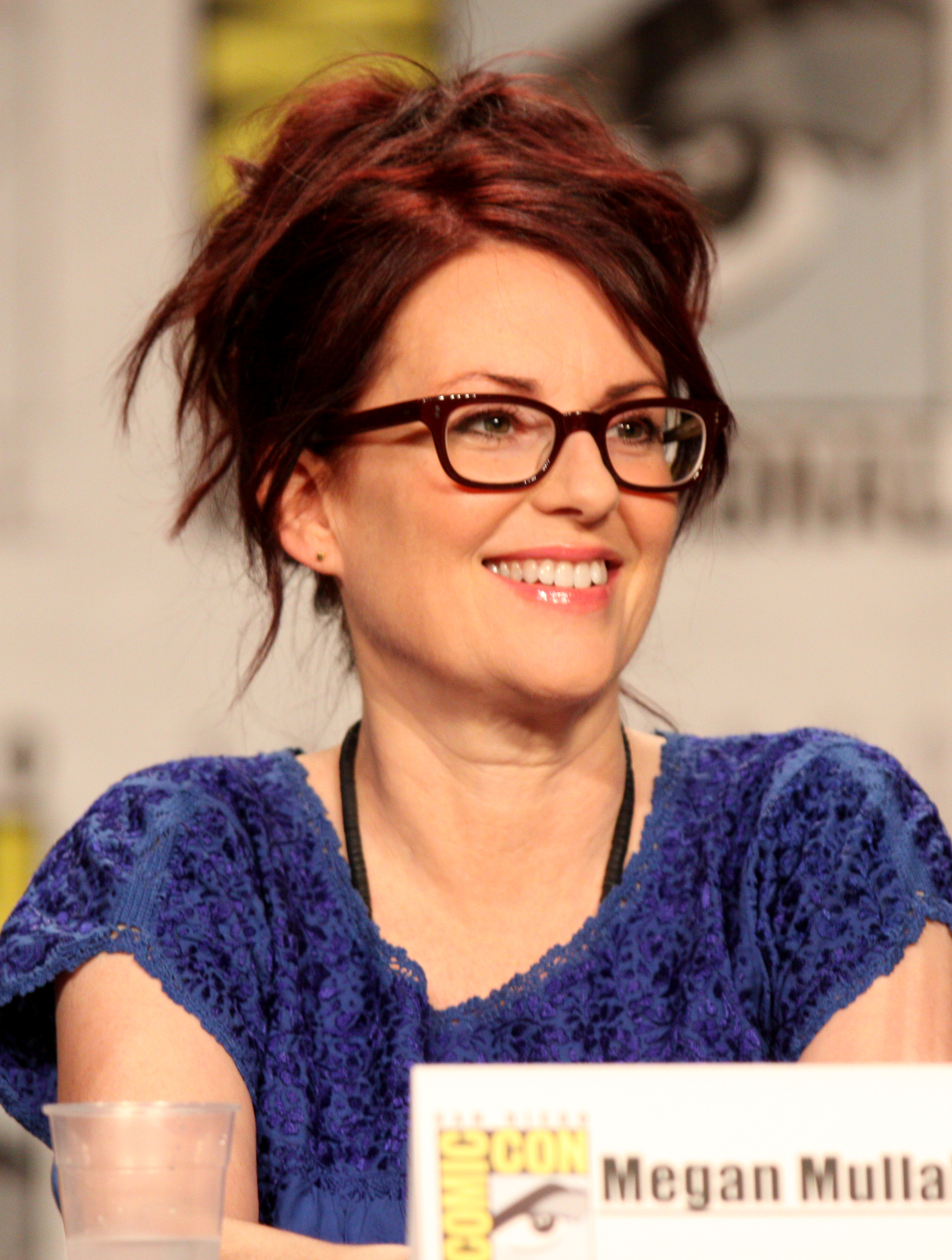
Nick Offerman's real-life wife Megan Mullally played Ron's ex-wife Tammy II.

Tammy Swanson (Megan Mullally) is the second ex-wife of Ron Swanson. Tammy II is an exuberant, manipulative woman who uses sex as a weapon, and constantly tries to make Ron miserable. However, Ron retains an intense sexual attraction to her, which she exploits for her sadistic pleasure. She attended Tammy I's Sunday school classes when she was younger, implying she grew up in the same town as Ron. She has a sister named Beth, with whom she has a hostile relationship, a fact which prompts Ron to have a brief liaison with Beth in Season 1.

Tammy II is director of the Pawnee Library, which is considered a horrible place by Leslie Knope and the parks department employees. After being directly referenced numerous times, she is physically introduced in "Ron and Tammy," when she approaches Leslie in a friendly way under the guise that she wants to talk to Ron and work out their differences, but is secretly scheming to persuade Ron to give her a lot Leslie wants to turn into a park, so she can turn it into a new library branch instead. When Tammy II and Ron reconnect, the two have a very vocal fight which quickly devolves into sex, and briefly reconcile as a couple. However, Ron eventually realizes he is being manipulated, and resists Tammy's efforts with help from Leslie. Tammy II returns in "Ron & Tammy: Part Two," when Tom asks her on a date to make Ron jealous, not realizing he has broken up with Tom's ex-wife Wendy. Tammy and Ron end up having a drunken night of sex, vandalism and mayhem, ending with the two of them getting remarried. However, when Tom tries to intervene and Tammy II brutally beats him up, Ron remembers how horrible she is and divorces her again. Tammy II briefly appears in the third-season finale, "Li'l Sebastian," where she and Ron learn together that Ron's first wife, "Tammy I," has arrived in town, making Tammy II flee in terror. In the Season 5 episode "Ron and Diane", Tammy II appears at a woodworking show where Ron is getting an award with plans to seduce him, leading to much pain for Leslie when she commits to ensuring Tammy doesn't get close to Ron and his new girlfriend Diane. Diane is wrongly more worried by Leslie's friendship with Ron than Tammy II's behavior, and Tammy ends up locking Leslie in the trunk of her own car and taking off in it. Her wild driving leads to her arrest, and her charges are intensified by the discovery of Leslie in the trunk. Luckily, Diane easily recognizes Tammy II's psychotic nature when faced with her again, and is happy to respond to her threat of a fight, successfully persuading Tammy that Diane is not intimidated by her effect on Ron.

Mullally is the real-life wife of Nick Offerman, who plays Ron. Michael Schur conceived the idea for "Ron and Tammy," and asked Offerman whether he and Mullally would be opposed to her playing such a terrible character. Offerman was extremely responsive to the idea. Offerman and Mullally improvised many of their on-screen fights, as well as their unusual kissing and sexual encounters. During one scene in "Ron and Tammy," where the two characters run into a motel to have sex, Mullally removed her top and threw it into the air, an improvised move that she did not tell the crew she planned to do. Mullally's performance was well received by viewers, which made the Parks and Recreation producers feel more comfortable about using celebrity guest actors in later episodes.

=== Tamara Swanson (Tammy Zero) ===
Tamara "Tammy" Swanson (Paula Pell) is Ron's mother. She shares many personality traits with her son, and seems more than aware of the effect his ex-wives have on him. She first appeared in the episode "Ron & Tammys." She lives on the farm Ron grew up on, and has an entire room devoted to guns.

=== Diane Swanson ===
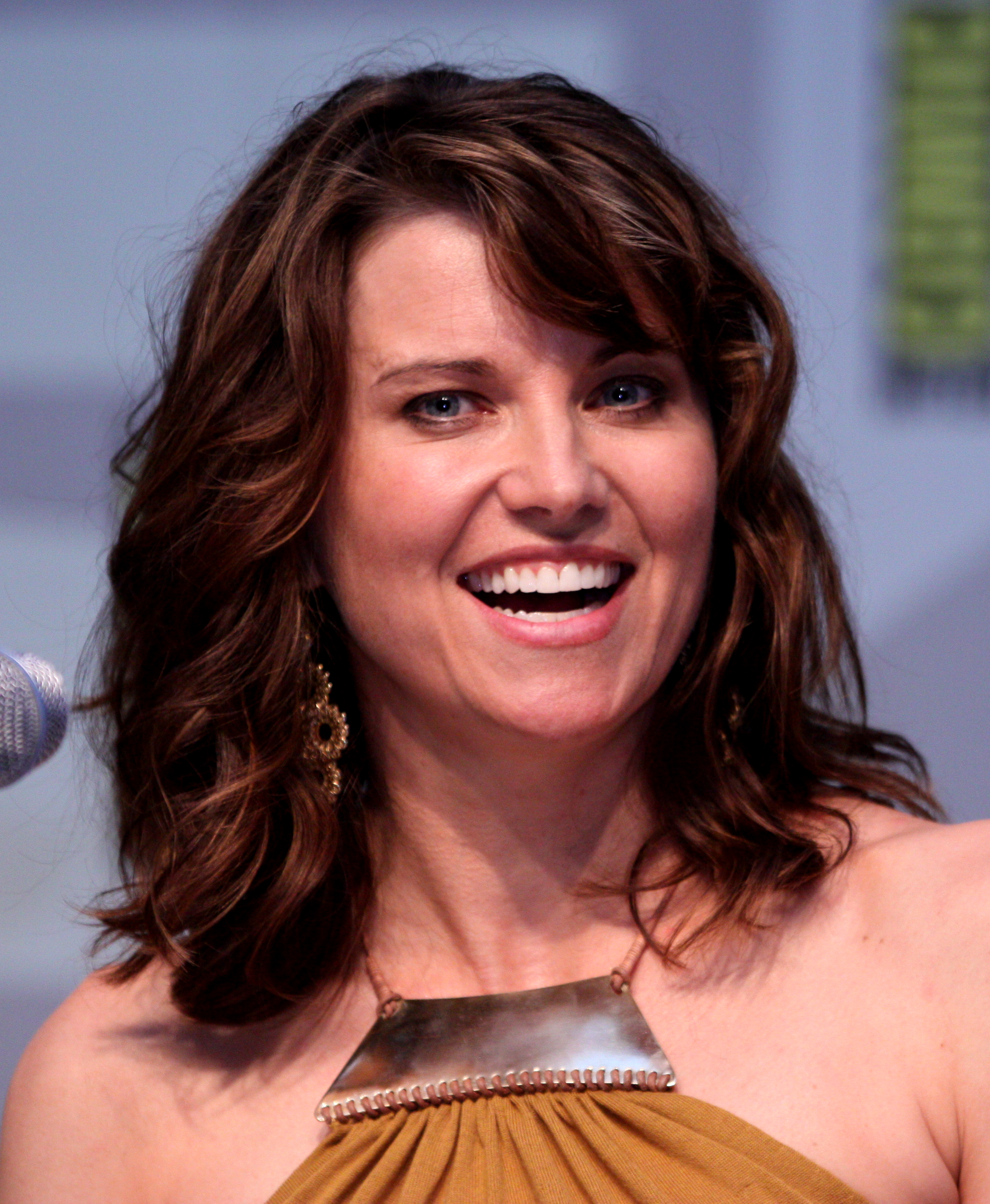
Lucy Lawless portrayed Diane Lewis.

Diane Elizabeth Lewis (Lucy Lawless) is the girlfriend and eventual wife of Ron Swanson. She was introduced in the third episode of Season 5, "How a Bill Becomes a Law." She is a middle school vice principal and a single mother of two girls, Ivy and Zoe. Ron meets her when he goes to fix a pothole in front of her house, having decided to fix it himself after learning the Department of Public Works have ignored her complaints.

Diane is markedly different from Ron's previous partners: she is not named "Tammy" and has two young daughters. Ron is not good with children, or more specifically with girls (he had previously taken teenage and pre-teen boys camping to teach them survival skills, and also coached a basketball team). After he fixes the pothole, Diane's daughters dress up Ron and Andy as princesses, and have a little girl's tea party with them, which Ron tolerates surprisingly well. With prompting from Andy, Diane asks Ron out herself the next day, earning his respect. Ron's affection for Diane grows, and in "Halloween Surprise" he officially begins a relationship with her, deciding that dating a single mother might help him expand his life experience. In "Ron and Diane," Diane shows an impressive level of patience and understanding at Tammy II's psychotic attempts to ruin her relationship with Ron. In a private conversation with Leslie, Diane admits that she feels more threatened by her than by Tammy II, as she feels Leslie knows Ron in a way she never can. Ron later assures her that while Leslie is a loyal friend and colleague, he could never have any romantic feelings towards her. To prove his commitment to Diane, he shows her his double life as night club saxophonist Duke Silver (a part of his life Leslie doesn't know about), and plays her a song, naming her as his "duchess." In the same episode, Leslie decides that Diane is a good guardian of Ron's well-being and a shield against the disruptive antics of Tammy II. In "Women in Garbage," Ron is babysitting her daughters in the office with Ann, and accidentally allows them to lock themselves in his office with the contents of Ann's medical bag. Before Ron and Ann can stop them, the girls cut each other's hair with Ann's scissors; when Ron considers Diane's potential reaction, he blurts out that he is in love with Diane, which he immediately tries to take back. Diane, however, is understanding of the accident, saying that it was just kids being kids. She tells him that she is touched by how much he cared, and that she loves him. Ron sheepishly admits that he loves her as well.

In the first episode of the sixth season, Diane reveals she is pregnant. Ron immediately proposes, and she accepts under one condition: that the wedding be as plain as possible. The two instantly go to the fourth floor of City Hall and are married in an extremely fast-paced wedding, with Leslie as maid of honor and April as Ron's "best man." When Leslie, Ron, April and Andy are in London, it is revealed that Diane suggested tagging along to make the trip hers and Ron's honeymoon, but her morning sickness meant that she couldn't go. Ron and Diane's son, John Swanson, is born later in the season.

Diane does not appear in Season 7, but is frequently mentioned. She and Ron remain married as of the series finale, "One Last Ride."

=== Zoe and Ivy Lewis ===
Zoe (Sadie Salazar) and Ivy Lewis (Rylan Lee) are Diane Lewis's daughters and Ron's step-daughters. When Ron begins dating their mother, he initially struggles with the fact that she has children, as he is not naturally drawn to them (in stark contrast to Andy, who offers Ron advice on how to interact with them). He is particularly inexperienced with small girls; both Ivy and Zoe love traditionally feminine activities, and relish dressing up Ron and doing his makeup, which he is often powerless to stop. Ron's early efforts at caring for them are particularly brutal, including destroying a tiara they are arguing over in order to remove the problem. Ron is dismissive when Diane reprimands him, believing it is not necessary for him to bond with them, but realizes his error when Diane informs him they have no future if he refuses to acknowledge her daughters. After this, Ron tries significantly harder with the girls, growing more comfortable in his role as their caregiver and, ultimately, their stepfather. He grows to genuinely love Zoe and Ivy, and treats them as his daughters; by "Moving Up," they have begun calling him "Daddy" instead of "Ron."

In the series finale, Ron shows Ben and Leslie a photo of his children, and reveals that Ivy has been accepted into Stanford University.

=== Gayle Gergich ===
Gayle Gergich (Christie Brinkley) is Jerry's inexplicably gorgeous wife, and the mother of their equally gorgeous daughters, Millicent, Miriam and Gladys. Gayle has a solid and overly-affectionate relationship with Jerry, puzzling to his coworkers. She is referenced until she makes an appearance in "Ron and Diane." She also appears again in "Jerry's Retirement."

=== Millicent Gergich ===
Millicent "Millie" Gergich (Sarah Wright) is the beautiful eldest daughter of Gayle and Jerry. She was introduced in Season 4 as Chris's love interest; Jerry is uncomfortable when he learns Chris is interested in his daughter, but gives his blessing to the relationship. In "Bowling for Votes," Chris mentions his plans to move in with Millicent, but she breaks up with him off screen that same episode. In "Ron and Diane" it's revealed that Millicent is engaged to a rafting instructor named Carl, who appears to be just as “perfect” as she is. She makes another brief appearance in "Jerry's Retirement."

=== Gladys Gergich ===
Gladys Gergich (Katie Gill) is one of Gayle and Jerry's other daughters. She first appears in "Ron and Diane," singing Christmas carols with her mother, father, and sister Miriam. She also appears again in "Jerry's Retirement."

=== Miriam Gergich ===
Miriam Gergich (Maliabeth Johnson) is one of Gayle and Jerry's other daughters. She first appears in "Ron and Diane," singing Christmas carols with her mother, father, and sister Gladys. She also appears again in "Jerry's Retirement."

=== Mona-Lisa Saperstein ===
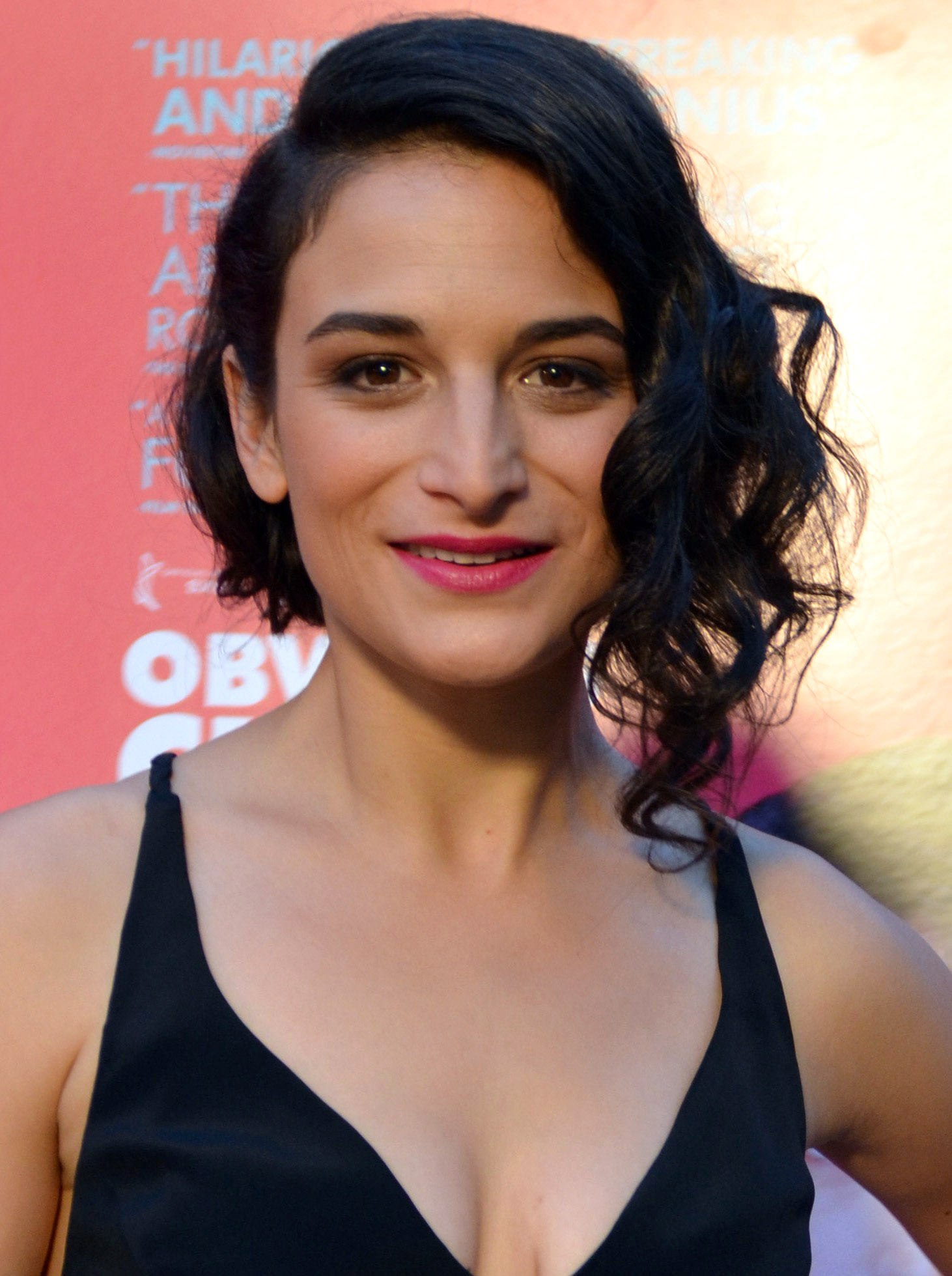
Jenny Slate

Mona-Lisa Saperstein (Jenny Slate) is the sociopathic, outgoing twin sister of Jean-Ralphio Saperstein, described by him as "a klepto, and a nympho, and a pyro." She is also the former girlfriend of Tom Haverford. She is partly responsible for the opening of her father Dr. Saperstein's store which eventually runs Tom Haverford's Rent-a-Swag store out of business. She first appeared in season 5 and continued to appear in the final two seasons (particularly Season 6) as an unreformed lunatic who frightened/terrorized anyone in her path. When she appears in Season 7 her father offers an embarrassed explanation for her insanity by telling Ben and April one word: "pills."

=== Dr. Saperstein ===
Dr. Lu Saperstein (Henry Winkler), the father of Jean-Ralphio and Mona-Lisa, is a gynecologist in Pawnee who invests in several area businesses. Though he openly admits his two children are ne'er-do-well leeches, he loves them unconditionally anyway. After Tom and Mona-Lisa break up, Dr. Saperstein opens a store similar to Tom's Rent-a-Swag directly across the street for the express purpose of ruining Tom and forcing him to sell his store cheaply. He later relents a bit and offers Tom a deal that will let him break even as well as get a small portion of "Tommy's Closet" revenues going forward, which Tom glumly accepts. He is also the doctor whom Ann and Chris go to while the former is pregnant. In the season six finale, he shows up to the opening of Tom's Bistro (Tom is aghast to see him, but Mona-Lisa cluelessly followed up on Tom's request to bring in big names) and is happy when it appears the restaurant is going to flop. However, he later states the food is incredible and asks Tom if he can be a minority investor, to which Tom coolly replies that he will give Dr. Saperstein's offer some time and thought.

=== Typhoon Montalban ===
Norman "Typhoon" Montalban (Rodney To) is a Pawnee hairdresser and the eventual husband of Craig Middlebrooks. Typhoon is introduced in the fifth episode of Season 6 as Donna's hairdresser, and she later recommends him to Ron following the passing of his regular barber. Ron is initially reluctant to take on a new stylist, but bonds with Typhoon over their shared hatred of Europe and bicycles. Typhoon meets Craig for the first time while serving as Donna's stylist for her wedding, and their relationship develops further in the series finale, culminating in their marriage; Ron is the best man at their wedding. Typhoon and Craig feature again in the finale's furthest flash-forward, which reveals that they remain happily married into their old age.

=== Oliver and Leslie Perkins-Traeger ===
Oliver and Leslie Perkins-Traeger are Ann and Chris's children. Oliver is conceived when Ann, having grown fed up of dating around, decides to become a mother via sperm donation. After rejecting the option of a sperm bank, she eventually asks Chris to be the donor. In the process, Ann and Chris reconcile as a couple, and ultimately conceive naturally with the intent of raising the baby together. Their son Oliver is born during the events of "Galentine's Day" in Season 6. In the series finale, it is revealed that Oliver has a younger sister named Leslie, presumably after Leslie Knope.

=== Stephen, Sonia and Westley ===
Stephen, Sonia and Westley Knope-Wyatt (Maxwell Weaver, Kaitlyn Otey & Carter Weaver in Seasons 6–7, Christian Schick, Chloe Ewing & Harrison Schick in the series finale) are Leslie and Ben's triplets, born between the events of Season 6 and 7. They are shown to be unruly and demanding as toddlers, but once they are older, even April is willing to admit how much she liked them. In the series finale, Sonia forms a bond with Oliver Perkins-Traeger, prompting a poorly-concealed attempt by Leslie and Ann to make them fall in love.

=== Jack Dwyer ===
Burt Snakehole Ludgate Karate Dracula Macklin Demon Jack-o-Lantern "Jack" Dwyer is April and Andy's son. Despite Andy's blatant desire to have children, April is hesitant to comply for some time, before finally warming to the idea after a conversation with Leslie. In the series finale, their son Jack is revealed to have been born in Pawnee on October 31, 2023, with his mother in full Halloween makeup while giving birth. He appears once again as a toddler during the reunion of the Parks department, where April reveals that she and Andy are expecting another baby.

== Elected officials and city employees ==
=== Bill Dexhart ===
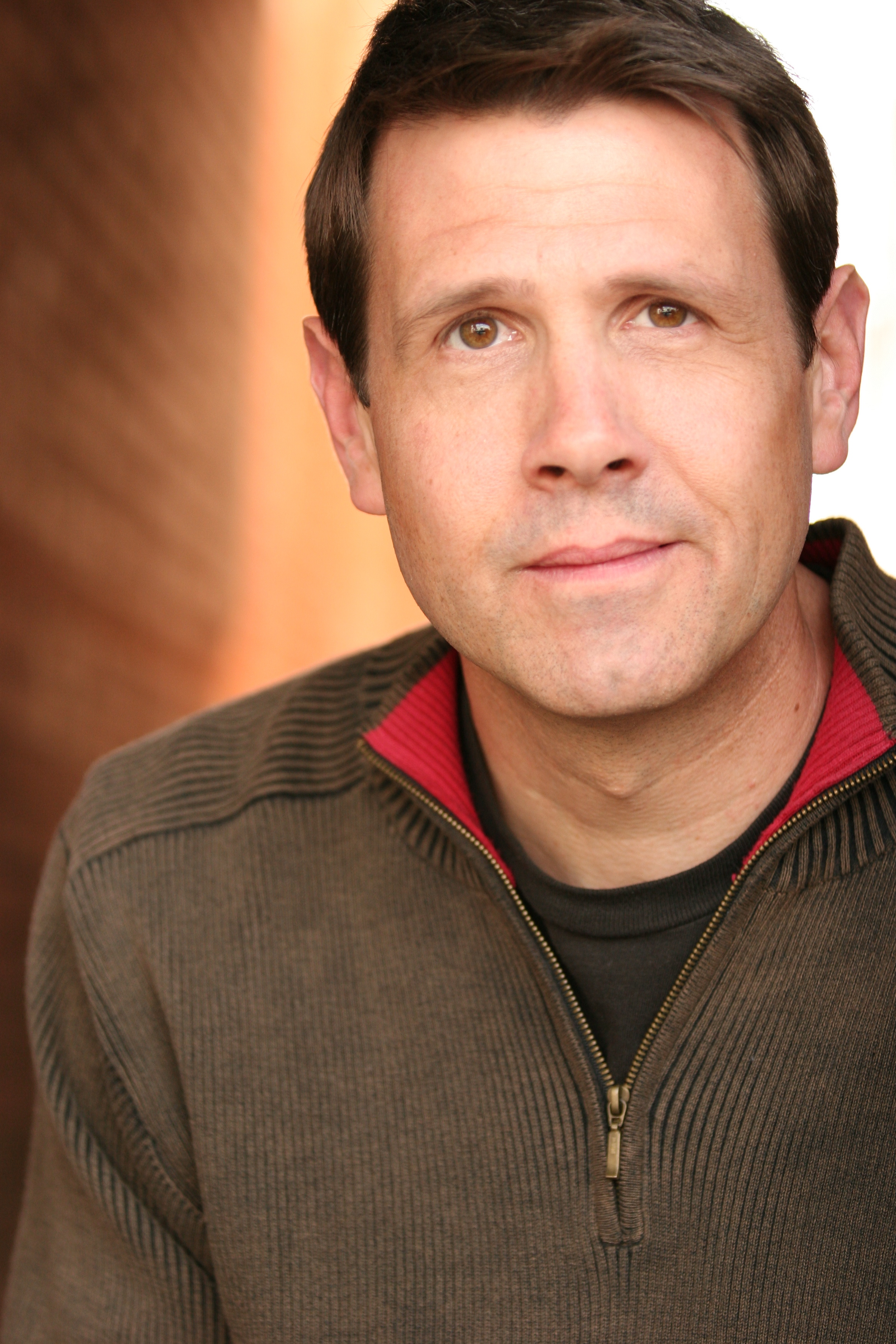
Kevin Symons portrays Pawnee Councilman Bill Dexhart.

Bill Dexhart (Kevin Symons) is a Pawnee councilman who regularly participates in outrageous sex scandals with multiple partners. His character was inspired by South Carolina Governor Mark Sanford and his 2009 scandal, in which he admitted to a long-time extramarital affair with an Argentinian woman. Dexhart first appeared in "Practice Date," when he publicly admitted to having participated in a foursome in a Brazil cave under the guise of building houses for the underprivileged. Dexhart was featured prominently in "Christmas Scandal," which began with Leslie portraying him in a satirical holiday skit in which he discussed his affair with multiple women that resulted in a love child. Unbeknownst to Leslie, Dexhart turned out to be involved in a sexual arrangement very similar to that one: four-way sex in a hospital room where he has just overseen the birth of his love child. When he confronted her about it, members of the media took pictures of Leslie and Dexhart together and speculated that the two of them were having an affair. Dexhart refused to deny the allegations, and even went so far as to confirm them, because the fictional affair was less scandalous than his actual sexual indiscretions. As proof of the affair, he claimed Leslie had a mole on her right buttock, but she publicly proved him wrong by dropping her pants on live television and revealing there is no mole. In Season 5 he was something of a swing vote for Leslie on the City Council because he was less likely to fully support her than Howser, but also less likely to thoughtlessly oppose her than either Milton or Jamm. That has changed during the recall campaign against Leslie in Season 6, as Dexhart has cheerfully joined Jamm in blocking any initiatives by her and making it clear they both hope she is booted from office. In the episode "Second Chunce," Dexhart publicly confesses to "texting, sexting and Tex-Mexting" approximately one hundred women under a series of implausible pseudonyms, parodying the Anthony Weiner sexting scandals. In fact, "Anthony Weiner" is the last in the list of pseudonyms Dexhart reads out at a press conference. Leslie briefly considers running for his seat after being impeached, but is dissuaded by Jennifer Barkley. The district that Dexhart is in charge of is a run-down, crime-ridden part of town that he had promised to clean up, but his only action has been to rename it Beach View Terrace.

=== Carl Lorthner ===
Carl Lorthner (Andy Samberg) is a park ranger and the head of outdoor security for Pawnee. He constantly talks extremely loudly, speaking at screaming levels even when asked to talk quietly, and works as a ranger because he cannot hold down a job that involves working indoors due to his inability to control the volume of his voice. Carl appeared in "Park Safety," in which Jerry claimed to be mugged in Ramsett Park, which fell under Carl's territory. Leslie launched efforts to make the parks safer and had Carl take them on a tour of the area; he showed Leslie, Tom and Jerry around on a mobile cart that had been attacked and urinated upon by raccoons. Carl eventually discovered that Jerry was not mugged at all, but accidentally fell into a creek by himself. Angry that Leslie blamed Carl's security measures for the mugging, he threatened to reveal the truth on Joan Callamezzo's morning news show, Pawnee Today. Leslie convinced him not to do so at the last minute, and they instead angered Callamezzo by discussing the 2009 film Avatar and whether it lived up to its hype.

=== George Williams ===
George Williams (Biff Yeager) works in the Public Works Department, first seen in the season three episode Jerry's Painting, although he was referred to as "Lenny." In “Li'l Sebastian.” he worked as a maintenance worker for Li'l Sebastian's funeral, as witnessed Ben and Leslie kissing. To keep him from revealing their secret, Ben and Leslie give him a $50 spa gift certificate. He reappears in The Trial of Leslie Knope, where it is revealed he is a NASCAR enthusiast. He testifies against Leslie and provides the key evidence against her.

=== Douglass Howser ===
Councilman Howser (Yvans Jourdain) is a Pawnee councilman who repeatedly encounters Leslie in embarrassing or awkward situations around city hall, during which time Leslie nevertheless tries to discuss politics with him. For example, in "94 Meetings," Leslie ran into Councilman Howser in the men's bathroom, which she entered while following Ron Swanson and trying to discuss something with him. Afterward, Leslie awkwardly blurted to Howser, "Councilman Howser. I saw your penis." That being said, he is depicted as by far the most rational Council member and has consistently supported her proposals and plans since she was elected. In "Filibuster" he can be seen as visibly pleased that Leslie had successfully filibustered Jamm's attempt to block former Eagletonians's right to vote.

=== Hugh Trumple ===
Hugh Trumple (Eric Pierpoint) is chief of the Pawnee police department. He has a very serious and gruff personality, and speaks in a dry, monotonic manner. Trumple has great respect for Leslie Knope because of her passion for helping those around her. Chief Trumple first appeared in "Ron & Tammy: Part Two," when Ron Swanson gets arrested for a night of debauchery with his ex-wife Tammy. The chief agreed to Leslie's request that he release him to Leslie's custody. Ben feared Leslie cashing in this favor meant the chief would not agree to provide security for the upcoming harvest festival, but Chief Trumple agreed to do so anyway out of his respect for Leslie, telling Ben he will always do favors for Leslie because she is the kind of person who uses those favors to help people. The chief reappeared in the episode "Eagleton," where he arrested Leslie when she refused to apologize after getting in a fight with Lindsay Carlisle Shay, her rival from the neighboring city of Eagleton. Trumple retired as police chief in Season 4.

=== Jeremy Jamm ===
An orthodontist by day, Jamm (Jon Glaser) is a member of the Pawnee City Council, and has made himself Leslie's major nemesis. He also appears to have a grudge against the entire Parks Department, angry over the fact that Leslie ruined his Paunch Burger plan. Tom shoved him into a swimming pool, Ann refused to sleep with him, and Ron punched him in the mouth. He is not a native of Pawnee itself but it is never revealed where he is actually from. During a orthodontic visit by Tom, Jamm admits that he only moved to Pawnee because it's two leading industries were corn syrup and rubber nipples, making it a "dentistry jackpot". After fighting with Leslie over the use of her private bathroom for her office, he becomes a continual thorn in Leslie's side for any proposal she makes. His catch phrase, "you just got Jammed," is used whenever he one-ups Leslie or any other adversary. He failed to turn Lot 48 into a new Paunch Burger restaurant when Leslie won over the city planning committee and got the Pawnee Commons park project approved, leading to him getting drunk and temporarily ruining Ben and Leslie's impromptu on-site wedding. Afterward, he was punched by Ron Swanson; both of them were thrown in jail but Ron was quickly released while Jamm was left to sober up in his cell, and the wedding took place at City Hall. He then sued Ron and it looked he would win, but Tom, Andy and April threatened a similarly bogus lawsuit that Jamm knew he would lose, so both sides backed off. When Leslie is under political pressure to resign, Jamm complicates Leslie's role on the council by teaming up with councilman Dexhart and voting down any proposal Leslie has, to spite her. When Donna Meagle accidentally sends a sexually suggestive tweet from the department Twitter, Jamm uses this as an opportunity to hold public hearings that put Leslie's ethics into question. After he holds a series of hearings to drag out Leslie's ordeal, Leslie publicly stands up to Jamm and says that she's going to get back to work as a councilwoman and won't attend any more of the hearings. In the season six finale, Jamm is shown at the Pawnee/Eagleton unity concert leading a secession effort. Jamm reappears in the Season 7 episode "Ron and Jammy," where he is revealed to be dating Tammy, Ron's second ex-wife. Leslie and Ron are feuding over the Newport land rights at this time, and Jamm is the swing vote on the issue. Leslie initially sees the relationship as an advantage, since Tammy would influence Jamm to vote against Ron; however, it becomes apparent that being with Tammy is detrimental to Jamm's physical and mental well-being. Leslie and Ron decide to put aside their differences and successfully coach Jamm into breaking up with her. Jamm then abstains from the land rights vote, leaving the issue deadlocked.

=== Fielding Milton ===
Milton (James Greene) is the longest-serving Pawnee Councilman, having been elected in 1948 as a Dixiecrat largely due to his commitment to de-integrating Major League Baseball, as well as a plan to re-open a former WWII Japanese-American Internment Camp in Pawnee and get it back up to speed. He is generally senile except on matters of racism and sexism, where his memory seems to be intact (he was able to calculate when Leslie Knope's next menstrual period would start during "Women in Garbage"), and he has generally—though not always—been on the other side of Leslie's initiatives.

=== Joe Fantringham ===
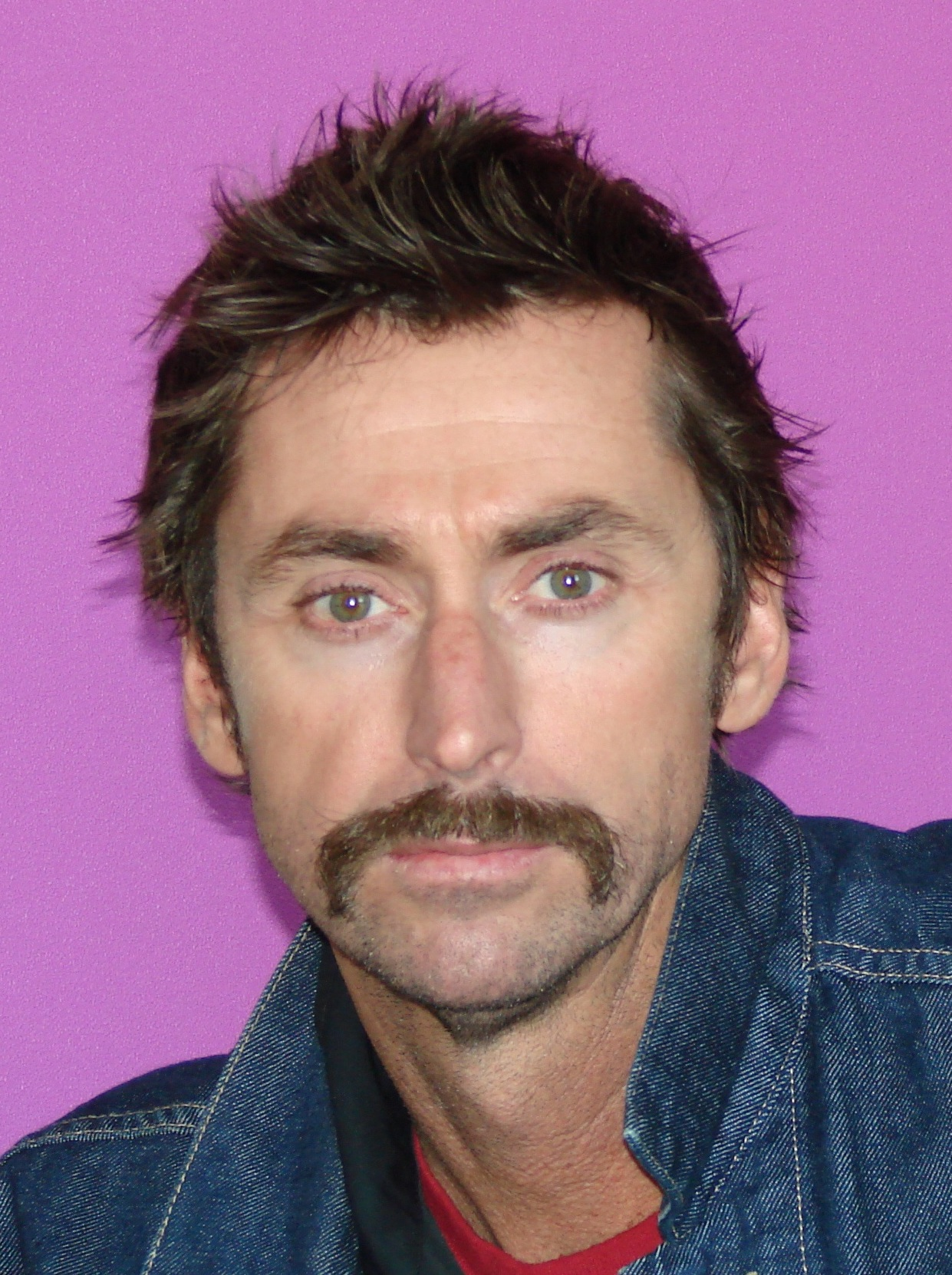
Stand-up comedian Kirk Fox portrays Joe Fantringham, who works in the Pawnee sewage department.

Joe Fantringham (Kirk Fox), also sometimes called "Sewage Joe," works for the Pawnee sewer department, which he calls the "Toilet Party." Despite the perception of the sewage department as grimy and noxious, Joe regularly hires strikingly attractive female interns. Leslie does not understand why he considers the sewer department better than parks and recreation. Joe first appeared in "The Camel," when the various Pawnee departments competed to design a mural for city hall. Joe was arrogant and bragged to Leslie about his department's chances at success, and his department ultimately designed a good mural, but the contest ended without a winner. In "Telethon," Joe made a pass at April. When she rejected him, he insisted he did not care because the sewer department is "waist deep in hot snizz," a reference to the sewer department interns. Joe also appeared in "Soulmates," where he made a pass at Leslie, prompting her to wonder why only jerks have recently seemed to be attracted to her. When Leslie asked Joe his standards for women, he replied only that they cannot be elderly. Ben Wyatt fired him after Joe sent a cell-phone picture of his penis to everyone in the Pawnee government. Also, Ann noticed from the picture that Joe had the mumps. In “Bus Tour," Joe later tried twice to hit Ben in the face with a pie in revenge, failing the first time (at one of Leslie Knope's campaign rallies, where he hit Jerry) before succeeding (at Bobby Newport's mansion) due to inept security from Andy's FBI agent alter-ego 'Burt Macklin' and then getting arrested. He later appears briefly in the fifth season, at the local sperm bank when he tells Ann and Leslie (who were there because Ann was trying to have a baby) that he and his friends were regular donors.

=== Ken Hotate ===
Ken Hotate (Jonathan Joss) is the leader of the Wamapoke people, Pawnee's local Native American. He also runs a casino in the city. He appeared in "Harvest Festival," where he asked Leslie to relocate her festival because it was taking place on the sacred burial grounds of the Battle of Indian Hill, where his ancestors were killed in a seven-day battle. When Leslie insisted there was nowhere she could move the festival without being offensive due to Pawnee's extremely bloody history, Ken threatened to place a curse on the festival. He knew the curse to be fake, but believed it would frighten people enough to ruin the festival, insisting, "There are two things I know about white people: they love Matchbox Twenty, and they are terrified of curses." Ken's efforts proved successful, as the local media learned about the curse and reported on it so extensively that the festival was nearly ruined. Leslie and Ken came to a compromise after Leslie agreed to place a Wamapoke history exhibit by the entrance of the festival, and Ken lifted the fake curse during a phony ceremony, where he said nonsense chants including "Doobee doobee do." Although Ken enjoyed giving Leslie some grief at this point, later on it is shown he fully respects her; when Leslie desperately plants Wamapoke artifacts on the Lots 42 site after Councilman Jamm and the Pawnee Restaurant Association henchwoman have broken an agreement to leave the site alone until a city meeting, Ken first accepts Leslie's apology and then bluntly threatens reprisals unless the agreement is reinstated, which a cowardly Jamm quickly agrees to do. Jonathan Joss previously voiced John Redcorn in the animated television series King of the Hill, which was co-created by Parks and Recreation co-creator Greg Daniels.

=== Kyle ===
Kyle (Andy Forrest) is a government employee and regular customer at Andy's shoeshine stand. He is routinely mocked and laughed at, not only by Andy but others at city hall as well, even Jerry Gergich, who himself is usually scorned by his co-workers. For example, in the episode "Camping," Kyle told Andy that his identity had been stolen and his bank account frozen, and Andy reacted by laughing hysterically. Andy and April have also stolen money from Kyle's wallet and ejected him from the shoeshine chair (but not before Andy poured Pepto-Bismol on Kyle's shoes). Kyle also appeared in "Soulmates," where he was one of the judges in a contest between Chris and Ron to determine whether vegan or beef hamburgers are better. Kyle complimented the umami taste in one of the burgers, prompting fellow judge Jerry to condemn him for acting pretentious. Ron Swanson also pawned Kyle off on Chris when Chris was trying to be friendly to Ron, with Ron knowing very little about Kyle beyond his first name, and Chris being politely distant to him.

=== Mayor Gunderson ===
Mayor Gunderson (Bill Murray) is the mayor of Pawnee during most of the show's run. In the final season, set in 2017, Perd Hapley announces Mayor Gunderson's death and an open-casket memorial is held in the city council chambers. In a video Gunderson assigned to be shown at his funeral, he remarks at how little attention he had been paying, and that he would take credit if any needed to be taken. He then points out that if there was any blame, it was the citizens' fault. His last statement is "Goodbye forever." This posthumous appearance by Bill Murray as Gunderson, is the only time he is seen on Parks and Recreation, although he had been mentioned in multiple episodes of the show. He was first mentioned in "Christmas Scandal," when the parks and recreation department held a satirical holiday skit full of inside jokes about Pawnee, and April declared, "That's crazier than Mayor Gunderson's dog, Rufus." He is also mentioned in the episode "Leslie's House," when Mark asks everyone if they heard about the incident involving his dog, prompting Ron to say, "Oh my god, it was a bloodbath." Mark later adds that as a result of the incident, someone from animal services would be fired. The mayor and his dog played a major part in the episode "The Possum," when Mayor Gunderson's assistant ordered the parks department to capture an opossum that bit Rufus on a Pawnee golf course. Andy, who helps Leslie capture the opossum, said at one point, "We're acting under direct orders from Mayor Gunderson's dog." For the funeral scene in the third-season finale "Li'l Sebastian," Michael Schur said the writing staff considered killing off Mayor Gunderson, but they instead went with miniature horse Li'l Sebastian because it was decided having an animal die would be more appropriate and less morbid. Having Bill Murray play the mayor was a long-time goal of the cast and crew of the show. Amy Poehler stated she would love Murray to play Mayor Gunderson and, during an appearance on Late Night with Jimmy Fallon, jokingly announced she would pay him $250 if he played the role.

After Gunderson's death, Garry Gergich was appointed interim mayor of the town.

=== Paul Iaresco ===
Paul Iaresco (Phil Reeves) is the Pawnee city manager, which makes him supervisor of all the departments and staff in city hall. He was first introduced in "Canvassing," when he asked Ron to fast-track Leslie's plans to convert a construction pit into a park. This inadvertently led to a disastrous public forum, where most attendees forcefully opposed the project. Paul appeared in several other Parks and Recreation episodes, including "The Master Plan," where he announced the pending arrival of state auditors Ben Wyatt and Chris Traeger due to Pawnee's crippling budget problems. In "Camping," Paul held a press conference to commend Leslie for her successful relaunch of the city's harvest festival. During the conference, he suffered a massive heart attack and accidentally clutched Leslie's breast as he fell to the ground; one newspaper's story about the incident read, "Knope Grope is Last Hope!" Paul took a leave of absence after an octuple bypass, and Chris Traeger took over as interim city manager.

=== Scott Braddock ===
Scott Braddock (H. Jon Benjamin) is a high-strung Pawnee city attorney who becomes extremely nervous about anything that could lead to a lawsuit. He appeared in "Kaboom," where Leslie accidentally injured Andy by arranging for a bulldozer to fill in a giant pit, unaware that Andy was inside it. He became hospitalized, and Scott encouraged Leslie not to apologize or admit fault in the incident because it would risk Pawnee getting sued. Scott constantly admonished Leslie when she tries to apologize, at one point shouting, "No miming!" when she made a motion indicating how bad she feels. Andy did file a lawsuit with the hopes of winning enough money to impress his ex-girlfriend Ann, but it ended with a settlement that resulted in the pit getting filled in.

=== William and Elizabeth ===
William (Johnny Sneed) and Elizabeth (Antonia Raftu) first approached Leslie in the third-season finale, Li'l Sebastian, about Leslie potentially running for city council. After she agrees, in season four, they start working on her campaign, as her advisors. In Citizen Knope, Leslie gives a Christmas ornament with "Knope 2012" written on it, to William as a present, and attempts to give Elizabeth a Knope 2012 menorah because she thinks but is not sure Elizabeth is Jewish (she isn't). When Leslie and Ben turn themselves in, and Ben resigns after Leslie's trial, William and Elizabeth inform her that she is polling at 1%, and they will no longer advise her on her campaign. Leslie accuses them of hypocrisy as she believes that they are romantically involved, however Elizabeth bluntly responds "I'm gay," William and Elizabeth make their final appearance in The Comeback Kid, as they tell Leslie that they are looking for other potential candidates.

=== Ethel Beavers ===
Ethel Beavers (Helen Slayton-Hughes) is an elderly town employee, who continues to work as the municipal stenographer.

=== Harris and Brett ===
Harris (show writer Harris Wittels) and Brett (Colton Dunn) are the two useless stoner employees of the Animal Control department. They are first seen in the second-season episode The Possum; Brett appears in six episodes and Harris in eight. In "Andy and April's Fancy Party," Harris and Brett attend the wedding party; despite this, Harris later asks if April is single. In "Operation Ann" in the fourth season, Harris is one of the men Leslie and Tom set up with Ann during the Valentine's Day dance. Tom tells her Harris still lives with his parents and has been to at least 200 Phish concerts; Harris informs them he has been to 308.

In the season five episode "Animal Control," Chris Traeger fires Brett and Harris after he steps on a coyote trap in the animal control office. Both subsequently reapply for the position and are the only two applicants; by this time they also live together. On his application, Brett lists his love of hamburgers under his qualifications for the job. When April asks why there are so many police outside city hall, the presumably stoned Harris and Brett quickly run off.

In the season seven episode "Pie-Mary," Brett and Harris are revealed to be secretly living in the basement of city hall. Ron, April and Andy ask them the location of the shoeshine stand while searching for a hidden key to Ron's home.

== Members of the media ==
=== Annabel Porter ===
Annabel Porter (Erinn Hayes) is the owner and CEO of Bloosh, a popular trends app. She first appeared in Season 6 episode Recall Vote and appeared again in Season 7 in episode William Henry Harrison. Annabel was the face of Eagleton's phonebook but decided to pursue her dreams and become friends with a bunch of celebrities. She lived in Kate Bosworth's pool house for four months, then returned to Pawnee to become a lifestyle guru.

In season six, she claims that her hair is "genetic and unattainable." In her home, they do not eat meals. They have "food teases," such as oat wedges and seaweed lozenges.

=== Crazy Ira and The Douche ===
Crazy Ira (Matt Besser) and Howard "The Douche" Tuttleman (Nick Kroll) are two shock jocks of a morning zoo-style Pawnee radio program. They serve primarily as a parody of those types of radio shows, especially in a small-town market like Pawnee. The show prominently features fart jokes and "your mom" insults, as well as constant sound effects from their sound man "China Joe," who hates his job. Crazy Ira and The Douche are widely admired in Pawnee, especially by Tom Haverford, and are considered much better than their rival radio show, "Tubby Tony and The Papaya" (who never appear on-screen). They first appeared on "Media Blitz" when, during an interview with Leslie and Tom about the upcoming harvest festival, they revealed their true motive was to lambast Ben for his failed tenure as a city mayor during his teen years. The interview proved disastrous for Ben, who was so socially awkward he could barely talk, and it led to other Pawnee media taking on the story and nearly ruining the harvest festival. The Douche reappeared in "The Fight," when he went on a date with Ann to the Snakehole Lounge bar. This came at a time when Ann was regularly going on a string of dates with random, underachieving men, and the date with The Douche led to a major argument between Ann and Leslie because Ann was supposed to be preparing for a job interview Leslie had arranged for her. Later, on his radio show, The Douche dismissed both Ann and Leslie as likely lesbians.

Before his appearance as Crazy Ira, Matt Besser was a co-founder of the Upright Citizens Brigade Theater, an improvisational theater and training center also co-founded by Amy Poehler.

During the last seasons of Parks and Recreation, Nick Kroll was dating Amy Poehler (Leslie Knope) in real-life and she also starred in his show, Kroll Show.

=== Derry Murbles and August Clementine ===
Derry Murbles (Dan Castellaneta) and August Clementine (John Hodgman) are the hosts of the public radio talk show "Thought for your Thoughts." The show is known for its particularly boring content and terrible song selections. August Clementine joined the show after the Pawnee-Eagleton merger.

=== Joan Callamezzo ===
Joan Callamezzo (Mo Collins) is the hostess of Pawnee Today, a local news magazine/talk show that combines elements of NBC's Today and news shows like Nancy Grace. She often serves as a parody of the media in her tendency to turn small matters into big stories and her desire to find the most negative possible aspects of any given story. (Note: ChicagoNow writer Andy Daglas referred to the Pawnee media as "notoriously nasty," and referred to Joan Callamezzo in particular as a satire of "gotcha journalism" who "search[es] for the tiniest shred of scandal to prey upon." Matt Fowler of IGN says "the evil Pawnee media really stand[s] out as being a bit too cartoonish" in their thirst for scandals and controversies. TV Guide writer Damian Holrook refers to Joan's coverage of the Pawnee harvest festival a "smear campaign.") Joan refers to herself as a "legendary newswoman" and is more intimidating than other members of the Pawnee media, as Leslie declares that she "runs this town." However, Leslie also has a tendency of taking over Joan's show when she appears on it and discussing whatever she wants. In "Christmas Scandal," Leslie appeared on Pawnee Today to refute accusations that she was having an affair with Councilman Bill Dexhart. When Dexhart himself appeared on the show and offered proof of the affair by claiming Leslie has a mole on her buttock, Leslie pulled her pants down on the show to prove him wrong. Upon realizing Leslie has no mole, Joan called Dexhart's lies about Leslie "No mole-gate," named after the Watergate scandal. In "Media Blitz," Leslie and Ben appeared on Pawnee Today to combat rumors that he was going to bankrupt the town due to his past as a failed teen mayor. Ben was bombarded with angry callers and labeled a "human disaster" on the show's subtitles. Joan reappeared in "Harvest Festival," where she was determined to find a problem with the festival Leslie organized. Initially disappointed to find no problems, she eventually learned about a supposed Indian curse placed upon the harvest festival by a local Pawnee tribe, which she turned into a major scandalous story. In later episodes, Joan has gone through an ugly divorce and become an alcoholic; when Ron Swanson appears on her show, she has just returned from a "booze cruise" and simply passes out during their taping, leading Ron to take over as host and do such a great job that the on-camera graphics show the episode as "You're on With Ron."

Collins was originally expected to appear only in one Parks and Recreation episode, but returned for subsequent episodes because the writing staff enjoyed her performance.

=== Perd Hapley ===
Perderick L. "Perd" Hapley (Jay Jackson) is a Pawnee television journalist and host of the television news programs Ya Heard? With Perd! and The Final Word With Perd. He also hosts a news segment called "Are You There Perd-verts? It's Me Perd, Hosting a New Segment." He often speaks in awkward tautologies such as "One more shocking revelation in a story that won't stop unfolding," "The statement this reporter has is a question," and "Also joining us today is a different person." Like other reporters on Parks and Recreation, Perd often serves as a parody of the pack mentality of the media and their tendency to generate scandals. (Note: Steve Heisler of The A.V. Club commented on the way other members of the media, including Perd Hapley, latch on to the curse story once Joan Callamezzo first reports it. Matt Fowler of IGN refers to the various media markets in Pawnee, who he said are "a bit too cartoonish" in their thirst for scandals and controversies. He also says these actions by the various forms of media are "only a little exaggerated" compared to real life.) Perd reported on the sex scandal involving Councilman Bill Dexhart in "Practice Date," the rumors of Leslie's sexual affair with Dexhart in "Christmas Scandal," and the supposed Indian curse on the harvest festival in "Harvest Festival." He also appears in "Telethon" as a guest of Leslie's 24-hour telethon, where he performed the dance move the worm to "Axel F." In "Media Blitz," Ben Wyatt appeared on Perd Hapley's show amid a media controversy about Ben's failed tenure as a teenage mayor. Although Perd only asked simple questions, the nervous Ben had a complete meltdown, which ended with him angrily referring to Perd Hapley as "Turd Crapley." Perd interviewed Leslie and porn star Brandi Maxxxx in "Jerry's Painting" to discuss whether a painting featuring Leslie nude can be considered art. In his younger days on Pawnee TV, Perd was a film critic who famously gave E.T.: The Extra-Terrestrial only 1 and 1/2 stars because "it's a good story, but it's just not believable." In the final season, he is shown dressed as a judge and hosting a TV show called The Perdples Court, while onscreen subtitles remind viewers that Perd is "not a real judge."

Jackson was originally expected to appear only in one Parks and Recreation episode, during which his character was seen only on a television screen. He returned for subsequent episodes, however, because the writing staff enjoyed his performance and liked writing jokes for him.

=== Shauna Malwae-Tweep ===
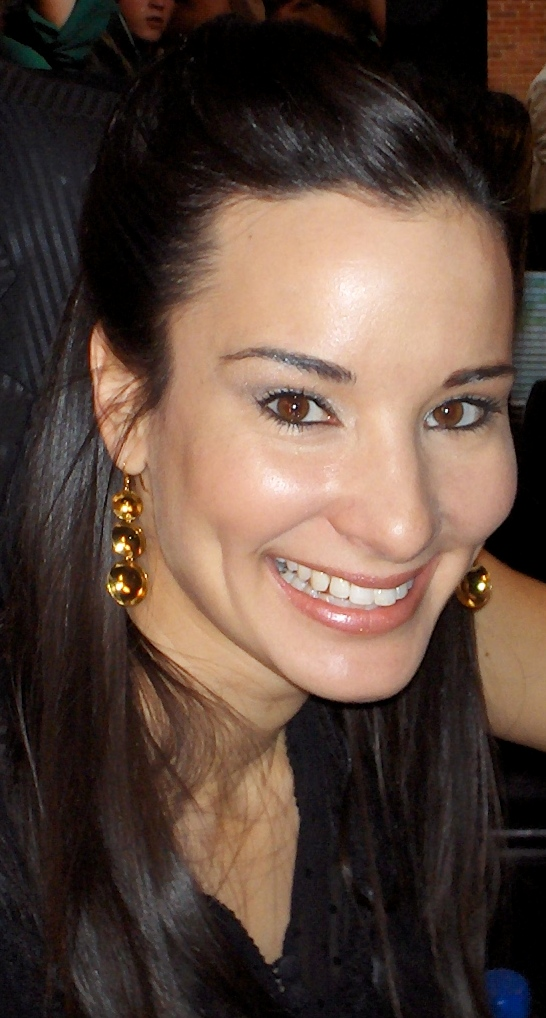
Alison Becker portrays Shauna Malwae-Tweep, the only non-regular character to appear in all seven seasons.

Shauna Malwae-Tweep (Alison Becker) is a reporter with the local newspaper, The Pawnee Journal. Leslie Knope frequently attempts to use the Journal as a friendly outlet, even dictating headlines verbatim to Shauna, but is either rebuffed or causes Shauna to stumble onto a story that will cause embarrassment for the department or Leslie personally. Shauna meets Leslie in "The Reporter," when she was assigned to write a story about the parks department's efforts to turn a construction pit into a park. When the interviews went badly, Leslie asked Mark Brendanawicz for help dealing with Shauna, and Mark ended up sleeping with her. Mark told Shauna he does not believe the park will ever be built. Later, Shauna agreed not to publish the story since she and Mark are in a relationship and it would be a conflict. When Mark says he cannot commit to a relationship, however, she goes ahead with the story. Shauna returned in "The Possum," where she interviewed Andy Dwyer for a story about his successful capture of an opossum that had bitten Mayor Gunderson's dog. During that interview, Andy made Shauna feel awkward by openly discussing her having previously slept with Mark. During scenes cut from the episode "The Master Plan," Shauna and Andy flirted with each other, but he ultimately rejected her due to his feelings for April, prompting her to declare, "I can't even land the shoeshine guy." Michael Schur said of the character, "She's just unlucky in love." Shauna also appears in "Time Capsule," where she initially started writing a story about Leslie's plans for a Pawnee time capsule. However, after Kelly Larson handcuffed himself to a pipe when she did not include the Twilight novel in the capsule, Shauna wrote that story instead, with the headline, "Parks Department Foiled by Pipe Dreams." Shauna also appeared in "Media Blitz" as one of the many reporters who wrote about Ben Wyatt's past as a failed teen mayor. In season 5, she briefly dates Chris Traeger. Shauna is increasingly shown throughout the show to have a particularly messy personal life. The season six episode "Galentine's Day" revealed that she had recently ended a relationship with a married man, and that she found out in college that her family was actually her father's secret second family. In the extended edition of the show's final episode, Leslie reassures Shauna that one day she will find happiness. In a flash-forward, Shauna is shown to have been left at the altar in 2018, crying on a park bench. Bobby Newport walks by and consoles her, and five hours later the two are happily married. Shauna is the only non-main character to appear in every season.

=== Kim Terlando ===
Kim (Jamie Denbo) is an obnoxious, untalented tabloid reporter working at the local rag "Pawnee Sun" who made her only appearance in Season 5's "Correspondents Lunch." Leslie was eager to perform a great skit at the event, but Kim (whose paper has been suspiciously capable of finding and printing embarrassing information about Leslie) ends up delivering all of Leslie's jokes. Unfortunately for Kim, Leslie and Donna find proof that Kim has illegally hacked into Leslie's e-mails, when Leslie sends a bait message about "midichlorians" in the soil near the Pawnee Commons project. Kim asks a question about the "news" only to have Leslie bluntly tell her that the substance in question is from Star Wars: Episode I – The Phantom Menace and she's just revealed that she's broken the law. Kim tries to act dismissive, but gets scared out of the room by Donna.

== Citizens of Pawnee ==
=== Barney Varmn ===
Barney Varmn (John Balma) is an accountant who first appeared in the season 2 episode "Leslie's House" where he gives a presentation to Leslie to try and save an accounting class he teaches at the William Percy Recreation Center. He works at Tilton & Radomski Accounting in Pawnee. He idolizes Ben Wyatt, laughing raucously when Ben makes accounting puns and often calling in an unseen character named Tad to hear the pun after he laughs at it. In later seasons, he offers Ben a job at his accounting firm on multiple occasions. Ben develops a pattern of accepting the job and then almost immediately quitting due to outside circumstances. He is also a fan of the Cones of Dunshire, a board game that Ben invented in season 6, and gets it copyrighted for him.

=== Brandi Maxxxx ===
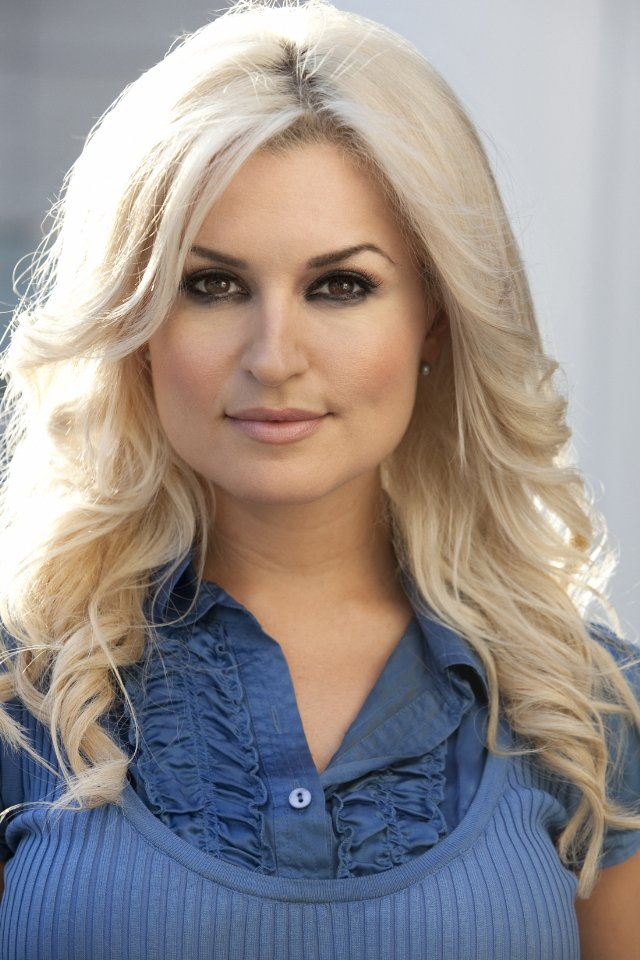
Mara Marini portrayed porn star Brandi Maxxxx.

Brandi Maxxxx (Mara Marini) is a pornography star who has appeared in more than 200 adult films, despite having been in the business only one year. She appeared in "Jerry's Painting" as a guest on the news show Ya Heard? With Perd!, where host Perd Hapley was interviewing Leslie Knope about a painting she appeared nude in. Brandi was also brought on as a guest and, to Leslie's chagrin, compared Leslie's painting to pornography and defended them both. She claimed anyone should be allowed to have sex anywhere they wanted, and falsely believed Leslie felt the same way. When Leslie quoted United States Supreme Court Associate Justice Potter Stewart's famous claim that he cannot define pornography but "I know it when I see it," Brandi was asked to define it and she replied, "For me, it's when the penis goes in." Brandi also invited Leslie to appear in her next film. Tom tried to flirt with Brandi, but his efforts were ruined when she recognized him as the basis of a baby-like cherub in the painting. In the episode "Campaign Shake Up," Brandi Maxxxx is also running for the City Council election, in third place in polls with 8% of the vote behind Bobby Newport's 45% and second place Leslie Knope with 30%. In the episode "Bailout," Brandi plays the role of Leslie Knope in a porn film about recent Pawnee political events, titled Too Big to Nail. In the final episode One Last Ride, a flashfoward shows that she eventually becomes the head of the Pawnee City Council, swearing in Garry Gergich for his fourth term as Mayor. Her character may be a reference to adult film star and candidate for Governor of California Mary Carey.

=== Chris ===
Chris (Will Arnett) is an MRI technologist at the hospital where Ann Perkins works. Ann sets Chris and Leslie up on a blind date in "The Set Up," which goes extremely poorly. Chris is openly rude to Leslie during the dinner, criticizing Leslie's alma mater of Indiana University and expressing disappointment that she only works in regular parks rather than amusement parks. Upon learning Leslie has never had an MRI, Chris insists on immediately taking her to the hospital and giving her one, a plan to which she reluctantly agrees. His inappropriate behavior continues at the hospital, where he makes creepy comments about her "industrial-sized" womb during the MRI and unsubtle comments about expecting to have sex with her later, including asking whether she is having her period. They part on bad terms, with Chris angry that Leslie refused to have sex with him after the date.

At the time of the episode, Arnett was the real-life husband of Amy Poehler, who played Leslie. However, it was not Poehler who arranged for him to be on the show, but rather Michael Schur, who is a good friend of Arnett and felt he would be a good fit for the character.

=== Jessica Wicks ===
Jessica Wicks (Susan Yeagley) is a Miss Pawnee beauty pageant winner who became the younger trophy wife of the elderly but wealthy Nick Newport Sr. Speaking with a slight Southern accent, Jessica is a superficial woman who cares deeply about her own physical appearance and tries hard to charm others around her. She won the Miss Pawnee contest in 1994 primarily based on her looks; her talent during the pageant was packing a suitcase. This was most likely intended by the writers to be an homage to the 1975 beauty pageant film Smile, where Miss Imperial Valley packed a suitcase as her talent. Jessica first appeared in "Beauty Pageant" as a Miss Pawnee panel judge along with Leslie and Tom. When Tom voted for the beautiful Trish Ianetta but Leslie pushed for a smarter but less attractive contestant, the superficial Jessica sided with Tom. She reappeared in "94 Meetings," where she organized a birthday party for Nick Newport Sr. by completely renovating and tearing down portions of the historic Turnbill Mansion. Leslie unsuccessfully tried to stop her, while Tom simply flirted with her, acknowledging she was a gold digger but calling himself a "gold digger digger." Jessica sang a horribly out-of-key song for her husband with an accompanist on the harp. Her husband, Nick Newport Sr. dies in Bus Tour, making her a widow. She takes over the family business, "Sweetums," making Ben the new Director of Charitable projects.

=== Kelly Larson ===
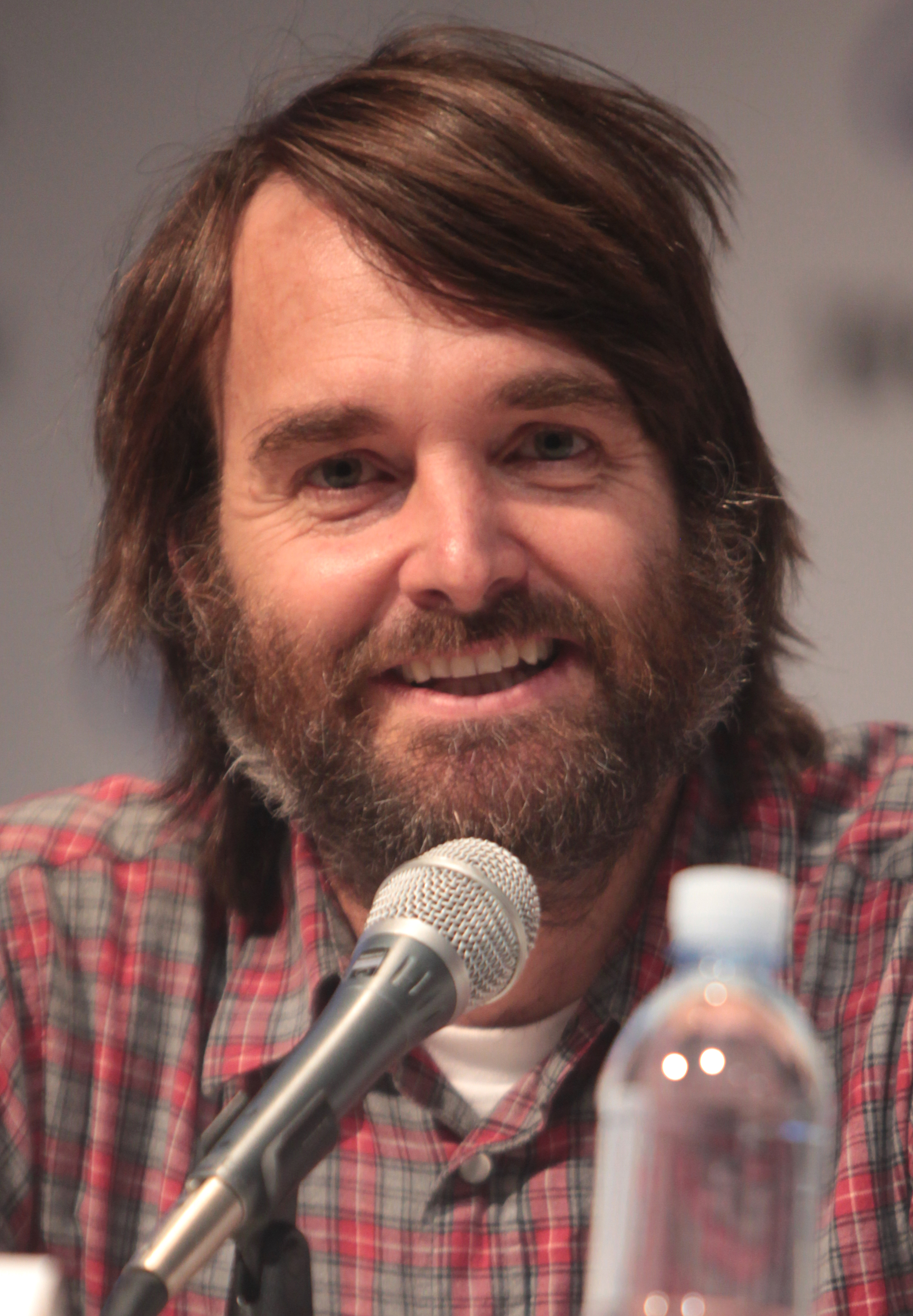
Will Forte played Twilight fan Kelly Larson.

Kelly Larson (Will Forte) is a Pawnee resident who advocated for Leslie to include the Twilight novel in a time capsule she was organizing. Appearing in "Time Capsule," Kelly is obsessed with Twilight and knows every detail about the books, the film series and Twilight author Stephenie Meyer. When Kelly visited Leslie's office to advocate for the novel, she politely refused, and Kelly responded by handcuffing himself to a pipe in her office, promising to stay there until she agrees. He spent three days in the office, where he got Tom interested in Twilight and held book discussions with Tom and Donna. Finally, Leslie revealed she knows Kelly's true motivations: he had recently gone through a divorce and was trying to impress his teenage daughter, who loves Twilight. Although sympathetic, Leslie cannot agree to Kelly's request or she would have to accept demands from all Pawnee residents. As a compromise, she held a public meeting where she listened to all demands. Ultimately, when the citizens could not agree on anything, Leslie submitted a video tape of that very meeting, which she believed symbolizes the spirit and passion of Pawnee.

=== Lawrence ===
Lawrence (Eric Edelstein) is a Pawnee resident who has criticized the parks and recreation department's plans at public forums, which embodied a recurring Parks and Recreation theme that only citizens opposed to projects bother to attend town meetings. He first appeared in "Canvassing" at a forum Leslie held to raise support for her proposed park project. Lawrence only complained about the loud music his neighbor Andy played. Andy said in an interview with the documentary crew "Lawrence lives with his uh grandmother, which is pretty awesome. He takes care of her, I guess. But whatever, he's a douchebag." He complained that Andy's music was "loud, . . . abusive, and [was] waking up [his] birds," causing Lawrence to admit that he had ". . . nice, pretty, expensive birds . . ." Lawrence was also the one who pointed out in the same meeting that April Ludgate had been planted by Leslie as a supporter for the park, having recognized her since she was at his door the day before. He ended the night by telling Leslie, "Hey park lady, you suck," to which she proudly replied, "Hear that? He called me park lady." The line was originally meant to be said by someone else, but Michael Schur said it was given to Lawrence because the Parks and Recreation crew liked Edelstein so much. Lawrence reappeared in "Boys' Club," where he angrily stole Andy's radio while Andy was bathing himself in a children's pool in the back yard. This prompted Andy to chase Lawrence through the street naked while using crutches. Lawrence also appeared in a scene that was deleted from "Ron and Tammy," but included in the second season DVD, in which he mocked Andy's new city hall job as a shoeshiner by giving him dozens of soiled shoes to clean.

=== Marcia Langman ===
Marcia Langman (Darlene Hunt) is a conservative activist with the Pawnee organization, the Society for Family Stability Foundation. She often serves as an antagonist to Leslie by objecting to her plans and arguing against issues she considers offensive. Marcia uses fear-mongering tactics and often expresses racist and homophobic sentiments. In her first appearance, "Pawnee Zoo," she objected to Leslie's marriage of two male penguins during a publicity stunt for the zoo. Offended by what she perceived as a public show of support for same-sex marriage, Marcia demanded Leslie's resignation and appeared on the morning news program Pawnee Today to debate the matter with Leslie. She next appeared in "Time Capsule," where Marcia objected to a proposal to include the Twilight novel in a Pawnee time capsule, claiming it included offensive sexual content and went against Christian values. Marcia reappeared in "Jerry's Painting," where she demanded the destruction of a painting that depicted Leslie as a bare-chested centaur. Condemning it as "government-funded animal porn," she took the matter to the city arts commission, which agreed to destroy it because they do not want to offend anybody. Marcia planned to publicly burn the painting, but Leslie had it switched with a decoy painting and kept the original herself. She initially blocked Leslie's sensible plan to teach safe sexual practices to senior citizens in Season 5, citing city laws that banned anything other than promoting abstinence (which had always only been applied to teenagers) but Leslie ignored the laws and proudly accepted a censure for doing so. One of Marcia's odd personality quirks is that she seems completely unaware of the fact that her husband, Marshall (played by Todd Sherry), is possibly gay or bisexual, as he has a flamboyant personality and speaks with an effeminate voice. Marshall's sexuality was never confirmed, but, when speaking to Chris Traeger, he smiles in a way that could be interpreted as attraction.

=== Newport family ===
The Newport family are the owners of the Sweetums candy manufacturer in Pawnee and one of the city's richest and most prominent families. The company has operated and thrived in the city for years, as indicated in the episode "Sweetums." where Leslie screened 30-year-old video footage of a then-young Nick Newport Sr. discussing how corn syrup was used to fatten cattle at farms. By the time of Parks and Recreation, Nick Newport Sr. (Christopher Murray) is an elderly man in a wheelchair so senile he can barely speak, and the company is run by his son Nick Newport Jr. (Gary Weeks), who himself appears in Sweetums commercials along with his two children, Dakota (Harley Graham) and Denver (Ryan Hartwig). In "Sweetums," the company formed a partnership with the city hall to run the concessions stands in Pawnee parks, and Nick Newport Jr. unveiled their new, supposedly-healthy energy bars Nutriyums. He promotes the energy bars through commercials that use similar propagandistic techniques as the commercials of real-life corn refiners: they feature warm images of Nick Newport Jr. with his dog Shoelace insisting corn syrup is "fine in moderation." Ann and Leslie held public forums to inform people the energy bars are not actually healthy, but the citizenry of Pawnee ultimately rejected their arguments and were won over by the charisma of Nick Newport Jr. and his family, particularly when Denver announced they should look under their seats for free Sweetums candy. Nick Newport Sr. appeared in the episode "94 Meetings," where his young and attractive gold digger wife Jessica Wicks held his 85th birthday party at the Turnbill Mansion. Jessica made major alterations to the historic mansion, and Leslie unsuccessfully tried to intervene to stop her.

=== Bobby Newport ===
Bobby Newport (Paul Rudd) is Leslie's chief opponent in her fourth season campaign for City Council. Bobby would appear to be the second son of Nick Newport Sr., who paid $250,000 to his campaign manager (Jennifer Barkley) in order to get Bobby elected. Bobby Newport is friendly and superficially charming, but extremely naive and clueless (he at times acts mentally handicapped despite the fact that he isn't), and has been completely spoiled by his privileged upbringing. When Leslie puts together a viral video that makes him look pathetic and stupid (in lieu of a nasty attack ad she ultimately refused to air), Bobby has a meeting where he complains she hurt his feelings, then asks her to drop out of the election and simply hand the office to him. He also tells Leslie he'll give her an invitation to his victory party, and even offers to let her do the job for him once he's elected. He spends much of the campaign away from Pawnee, and gets involved in a sex scandal while vacationing in Mallorca. He returns to debate Leslie, and during their debate, Bobby first appears to be in the lead by saying short quips rather than longer speeches, but Leslie eventually attacks his character and wins the debate. Afterwards, Bobby congratulates her performance during the debate and asks her if she would like to come to his house for a party. After Leslie connects with him upon the death of his father, he tells reporters that people who don't vote for him should definitely vote for her, and then says on TV that he's very relieved he lost the election to her. He is later considered a possible candidate for interim mayor after Mayor Gunderson dies. In the extended edition of the series finale, he is revealed to have married Shauna Malwae-Tweep. He makes an appearance by himself in the 2020 COVID-19-set pandemic special episode, where Bobby calls in from an isolated area in Switzerland where he seems to be happy but also isn't doing much. He hadn't know anything about the pandemic and reacts with audible shock when finally informed about what has happened in the world.

=== Trish Ianetta ===
Trish Ianetta (April Marie Eden) is an attractive young woman who won the title Miss Pawnee in "Beauty Pageant," She gave unintelligent answers during the pageant and displayed no actual talent: during her talent portion, she did a baton twirling act that involved simply moving the baton around without twirling it. In describing herself, she says, "I've been on YouTube. I love wearing bikinis at the beach with everyone there." Trish has been compared to Caitlin Upton, the 2007 Miss South Carolina Teen USA who made an incoherent response during the Miss Teen USA 2007 pageant. Based solely on her physical attractiveness, Trish was favored by the panel of judges, which included Tom Haverford and Jessica Wicks. Only Leslie objected to Trish and unsuccessfully argued for Susan, an intelligent and talented contestant who was less pretty. Trish made another appearance in "The Master Plan," where she was among the girls Tom tried to flirt with during a night at the Snakehole Lounge bar.

=== Greg Pikitis ===
Greg Pikitis (Cody Klop), a teenage boy living in Pawnee, Indiana, is Leslie's mortal enemy. His first appearance is in "Greg Pikitis," in which Leslie is determined to put a stop to his yearly Halloween tee-peeing of a statue. In response, Greg sneaks into the Parks department and vandalizes the offices. After several intricate mind games and plans, Leslie and Dave catch him in the act, and he is given probation for his crimes. He reappears in "Prom" in season 6, where Leslie is horrified to learn that he is the boyfriend of a girl she has been mentoring.

=== Ron Dunn ===
Ron Dunn (Sam Elliott) is the former director of Eagleton's parks department, the equivalent position of Ron Swanson's in Pawnee. In the Season 6 episode "Doppelgangers," he was brought over to the Pawnee offices along with other Eagleton employees when the towns merged. Swanson at first took a liking to Dunn, as the latter was mustachioed, taciturn and also named Ron. Dunn turned out to be a hippie with New Age ideals, and Swanson found him insufferable. Dunn was laid off along with most other Eagleton employees (except Craig), which he took in stride. He reappeared in "Flu Season 2," where Swanson and a drunk Ben encounter him at night, and he tries but is unsuccessful to help Ben overcome his anger at his parents' selling their vacation home. His final appearance is in the Season 7 episode "Two Funerals."

=== Tynnyfer ===
Tynnyfer (June Diane Raphael) is a former employee of Eagleton's parks department whose position was the equivalent of April's. In the Season 6 episode "Doppelgangers," she was brought over during the Pawnee-Eagleton merger. She is a stereotypical vacuous, rich housewife. With the inevitability of one of them being laid off, April ingratiated herself to Tynnyfer by mirroring her personality and vocal inflections, and encouraged her to quit her job. Tynnyfer replied that she was planning on doing that anyway, as she wanted to move somewhere warmer while her husband served time in prison. April gave her an address in Miami that she claimed was hers, and said Tynnyfer was welcome to climb over the fence and stay there. April then revealed in a cutaway that the house belongs to Dwyane Wade and she got the address off the Internet.

=== Dr. Richard Nygard ===
Dr. Richard Nygard is a character who is mentioned several times, but never appears on screen. He is first mentioned to be Chris's therapist, whom he sees near constantly. Chris's anxiety improves under his care. Later Leslie recommends Dr. Nygard to a troubled Malwae-Tweep, but then comments that she is not completely certain he isn't an imaginary creation of Chris's. Later, it is confirmed that he is a real person when he acts as the off-screen therapist to Craig Middlebrooks.

=== Pete Disellio ===
"Pistol Pete" Disellio (Tuc Watkins) is a local celebrity, only remembered for his last-second game-winning dunk in the annual Pawnee-Eagleton high school basketball game in 1992. As a middle-aged man he resents the fact that everyone in town still sees him this way. He appears in three episodes across Seasons 4–6, during which Leslie secures his endorsement for City Council, Ann considers him as a sperm donor, and Pete refuses to endorse Sweetums' new sports drink.

=== Dennis Feinstein ===
Dennis (Jason Mantzoukas) is one of Pawnee's wealthiest citizens, the arrogant and unpleasant owner of a successful perfume company. He changed his original name, Dante Fiero, to something considered "more exotic in Pawnee." First appearing in Season 3's "Indianapolis," Dennis Feinstein is at The Snakehole Lounge for his "Allergic" cologne launch party. Tom Haverford attempts to pitch his cologne to Dennis while there. Dennis laughs at him when Tom sprays the cologne, telling him it smells terrible, and dismisses him. In season 7, Feinstein buys out JJ's Diner, completely unsympathetic to the townspeople's protests.

== People from outside Pawnee ==
=== Detlef Schrempf ===
Detlef Schrempf is a real-life retired basketball player for the Indiana Pacers who portrays himself on Parks and Recreation. He first appeared in "Telethon," where Leslie invited him to make a guest appearance on a 24-hour diabetes telethon. Tom picked him up from the airport, but first took him for a drink to the Snakehole Lounge, where Detlef proved so popular that bar owner Freddy would not let them leave. After Tom got drunk on two light beers, Detlef took him to the telethon, where he made his scheduled appearance. Detlef made another appearance in the third-season finale "Li'l Sebastian," where Tom and Jean-Ralphio hired him to work for their new entertainment company, Entertainment 720. His only job was to shoot basketballs around the office; Detlef tried giving them business advice, but they disregarded it. In Season 4, he remained at Entertainment 720, and was hanging out with Roy Hibbert, who had the free time to work with them due to the NBA lockout; both men roundly mocked Tom and Jean-Ralphio's lack of business sense.

Prior to filming "Telethon," Schrempf's acting skills had been limited to appearances on the American comedy series Married... with Children and the German soap opera Gute Zeiten, schlechte Zeiten. Michael Schur said of his performance, "For a guy who literally never acted before in his life, he was really funny."

=== Eduardo ===
Eduardo (Carlo Mendez) was an attractive young Venezuelan man who briefly dated April Ludgate. The two met during April's vacation to Venezuela and she brought him back to Pawnee, primarily to make Andy jealous. Eduardo, who only spoke Spanish, first appeared in "Go Big or Go Home," where Andy vowed to continue pursuing April despite her new relationship. When April claimed in Spanish that Andy just described his plans to become a woman, Eduardo encouraged Andy to follow his dreams, surprising Andy. In "Time Capsule," Andy and Eduardo started bonding, particularly over their mutual appreciation for the Dave Matthews Band. When April learned they were becoming friends, she became frustrated and broke up with Eduardo, who returned to Venezuela.

=== Frank Beckerson ===
Frank Beckerson (John Larroquette) is a man who, in his youth, had a passionate love affair with Leslie Knope's mother, Marlene Griggs-Knope. The two met when Marlene was 18 years old and Frank, a lifeguard, saved her life. They had a two-week affair before going their separate ways. Decades later, Marlene shared the story of her long-lost love with Leslie, and Leslie's boyfriend Justin Anderson insisted they find Frank and surprise Marlene by reuniting the pair. Leslie was initially pleased with the idea, and together they tracked Frank to his new home in Illinois. However, the older Frank is an eccentric man who has long been unemployed and is extremely socially awkward, repeatedly vomiting in nervousness at the prospect of seeing Marlene. He also embarrassed Leslie by showing her naked photos of Marlene from her youth. Leslie tried to call off the reunion, but Justin insisted on going through with it, and they brought Frank to a Valentine's Day senior citizen dance to meet Marlene. She was initially pleased to see him, but upon learning his life amounted to nothing, she rejected Frank, who publicly berated Marlene on a dance hall stage before storming off.

=== Lindsay Carlisle Shay ===
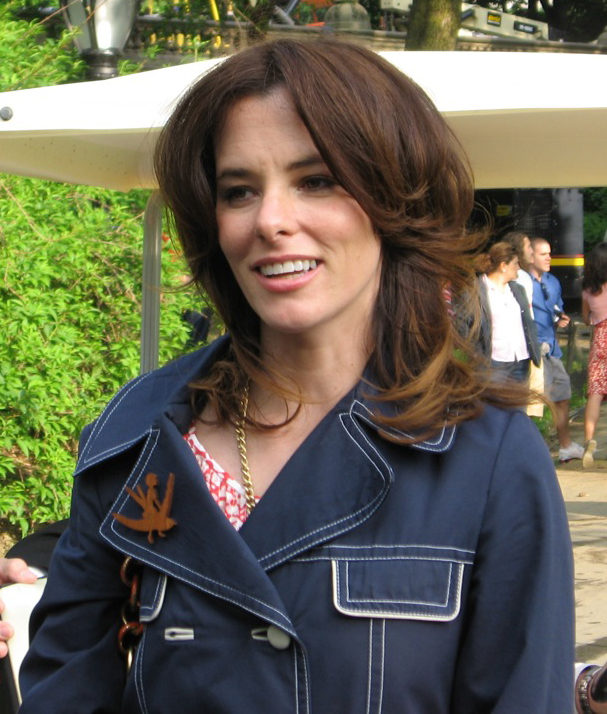
Parker Posey, who co-starred with Amy Poehler in the 2009 comedy film Spring Breakdown, portrayed Lindsay Carlisle Shay.

Lindsay Carlisle Shay (Parker Posey) is the parks and recreation director of Eagleton, Pawnee's more upscale neighboring town. Once best friends with Leslie Knope, the two are now bitter rivals. Five years before the events of the third season, Lindsay worked in the Pawnee parks department with Leslie, and the two made a vow they would never leave their hometown. Leslie was offered the parks director job in Eagleton but did not accept it due to this pact. The job was subsequently offered to Lindsay and she accepted, which Leslie considered an act of betrayal. Although she does not admit it, Lindsay appears to harbor resentment toward Leslie for having been offered the job first. Since leaving Pawnee, Lindsay lost 35 pounds, had a nose job, adopted a slight aristocratic accent and developed a snobbish, nouveau riche personality. She regularly insults Leslie and others in Pawnee with passive-aggressive, condescending comments, and has condemned Pawnee as "a dirty little nightmare from which you'll never wake up." Lindsay first appears in the episode "Eagleton," where she built a fence directly through a park Pawnee and Eagleton share to keep the Pawnee children out of her town. Leslie tried to fight this action, culminating in Leslie and Lindsay fighting amid piles of garbage and both getting arrested. Leslie ultimately solved the problem by turning Pawnee's side of the park into a wiffle ball field and making the fence its home run wall. Lindsay was ultimately impressed with Leslie's solution and her work ethic, and she seemed to respond positively when Leslie offered a reconciliation.

Posey previously starred with Amy Poehler in the 2009 comedy film Spring Breakdown. She had been in discussions with the Parks and Recreation staff to make a guest appearance since the show debuted, and grew frustrated when it took several months before she received an invitation.

=== Raul ===
Raul Alejandro Bastilla Pedro de Veloso de Maldonado (Fred Armisen) most commonly referred to simply as Raul, is a parks official from Baraqua, the Venezuelan sister city of Pawnee. He appeared in the episode "Sister City," when he and a delegation of Venezuelan officials visited Pawnee, where they were met by Leslie and her fellow parks department employees. Since he comes from a military state, Raul is accustomed to being treated like royalty, so he was unimpressed with the conditions of Pawnee and its citizens, who he treated rudely from the moment he arrived. He was particularly unsettled by Pawnee's public forums, in which the residents loudly and angrily criticized their government officials; Raul explained he usually holds his meetings in fortresses, citadels or palaces, and that anyone who complains or does anything out of line is immediately thrown in jail. Leslie got annoyed with Raul's insults, but he eventually offered her a check for $35,000, enough to completely fund her plans to turn a construction pit into a park. However, Raul explained a condition of the check was that Leslie must praise Venezuelan President Hugo Chávez and insult the United States, revealing they are part of what is called the committee to Humiliate and Shame America. Leslie angrily ripped up the check and sent Raul and his delegation away.

=== Jhonny ===
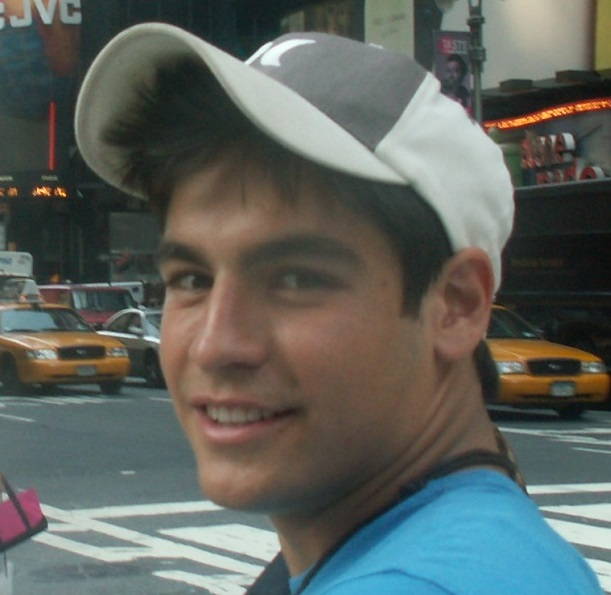
JC Gonzalez

Intern Jhonny Quijada (JC Gonzalez) most commonly referred to simply as Jhonny, is an internal officer of the official Baraqua Delegation, the Venezuelan Sister City of Pawnee. He appeared in the episode "Sister City," when Raul, Carlos, Jhonny and a delegation of Venezuelan officials visited Pawnee, where they were met by Leslie and her fellow parks department employees. Since he comes from a military state, The Venezuelan delegation is accustomed to being treated like royalty, so they were unimpressed with the conditions of Pawnee and its citizens. Jhonny is very excited about April Ludgate (Aubrey Plaza). Jhonny tries to approach April and go out with her to know the city, besides showing her interest to invite her to travel with Jhonny to his city in Venezuela. Jhonny invites her to go with him to Venezuela, his country and attend her like a princess full of luxuries and acts. During his stay, one night Jhonny sends a car to April to pick her up and take her to be with him but she uses the car to go to the movies with her friends.

=== Jennifer Barkley ===
Jennifer Barkley (Kathryn Hahn) is an extremely successful political operative who has taken over the City Council campaign of Bobby Newport after being promised $250,000 by the Newport family. She awed Leslie by appearing in a picture where she's sharing an egg salad with Colin Powell. Jennifer tells Leslie that she's bored and took this job for the money, not much caring who wins and finding Bobby to be stupid. While it appears she's being honest about this, she later trashes Leslie in a TV interview, edits Leslie's successful YouTube campaign ad to make her sound like an idiot, and swipes Leslie's building-ramp plan in favor of an electric lifts plan that leads Pawnee senior citizen powerbroker Ned Jones (played by Carl Reiner) to endorse Bobby. Leslie later confronts Jennifer at her favorite restaurant, where Jennifer says bluntly she likes Leslie but has been hired to defeat her. Jennifer then gives Leslie some genuinely good advice about upcoming decisions, and tells the camera that she is doing so because she has no one to play chess with and "sometimes I need to play against myself." Jennifer appears to keep her work and her personal feelings separate, given that she's able to relate to people when she's not working a campaign. When Leslie appears on Perd Hapley's show to reveal that Bobby Newport has been avoiding his hometown in favor of making out with a woman on a Mallorca beach, Jennifer says that Bobby is in Europe to get business opportunities for Pawnee and the woman is an anti-landmine advocate. Afterwards, she tells Leslie and Ben that she "mostly" made all that up, then details how she'll be able to spin any outrage from them in Bobby's favor. Leslie and Ben are left completely stunned by Jennifer's mercenary brilliance. The two are finally able to knock her off balance a little bit after Jennifer goes on Perd's TV show and says Leslie ordered a pet shelter closed (after Leslie had asked a retiring Councilman to reverse a funding cut for the Parks Department); after she's overjoyed with Leslie's idea that the Newport family use their wealth to fund the shelter, Leslie explains that she'll accept the initial funding cut if Jennifer breaks a promise to stop airing "puppy killer" ads, and that she's fine with losing a week's news momentum because she's debating Bobby Newport after that and she's going to ruin him. Jennifer's expression makes it clear Leslie has finally scored some points against her. But after Leslie does score a huge victory over Bobby in the debate and pulls within 2 points of him in the polls, Jennifer strikes back by using the death of Nick Newport (and Leslie's comments, made before she learned he had died, that Nick was a jerk) to force Leslie into several embarrassing mistakes. Jennifer finds out that she might not get any of her promised quarter-million fee due to her handshake deal with Nick, and watches as Bobby manages to tell the press that Leslie is an awesome person. The campaign having ended, Jennifer seeks out Chris Traeger and invites him to have sex with her, and he accepts. On Election Night, she tries and fails to keep pro-Newport voting machines in place, and later is rebuffed when she doesn't want an automatic recount to be triggered by Bobby's initial 21-vote victory margin. Recognizing Ben's talent on Leslie's campaign, she offers Ben a job working with her on a Congressional campaign (he eventually accepts it) and has sex with Chris again but leaves Pawnee without saying goodbye to him. When that campaign successfully ends in Washington D.C., she offers Ben another campaign job for a governor candidate in Florida. She appears again in Season 6 ("Second Chunce") to convince Leslie (as a paid favor to Ben) not to run for Dexhart's seat in the city council, but to reach for the stars and to look for a more high-powered job. Leslie said it was the best present she could have received (from Ben). She makes several more appearances in the seventh and final season, encouraging Ben to run for governor of Indiana.

=== Buddy Wood ===
Buddy Wood (Sean Hayes) is a journalist from Indianapolis that does an annual special where he profiles five political candidates from around Indiana. The candidates he profiles tend to get elected, causing him to be described as a "lucky charm" for people running for office. Buddy interviews Leslie, but this doesn't go well because she is drunk, and Wood tries to turn the story to Pawnee not being as great as it once was. Leslie and Ben consider him to be rude, but they still drive to Buddy Wood's house to beg him for either a second chance for an interview or for him to erase the negative footage; Buddy then sourly reveals that he never aired the interview because his bag was lost in Pawnee, unaware that one of the airport workers, who liked Leslie and was angered by Buddy's rude attitude, took the interview tape and threw it into a dumpster.

== Cameo appearances ==
=== Political figures ===
- John McCain, Barbara Boxer, Olympia Snowe: appeared in a party attended by Leslie in the 5th-season premiere episode "Ms. Knope Goes to Washington."
- Joe Biden: appeared in the Season 5 episode "Leslie vs. April." Having Leslie meet Biden was an engagement present that Ben gave Leslie. He also appeared in the series finale with his wife Jill Biden.
- Michelle Obama: appeared in the Season 6 finale episode "Moving Up." In the episode Obama tries to convince Leslie to take the job with the National Park Service.
- Newt Gingrich: appeared in the Season 5 episode "Two Parties." In the episode Gingrich gets mad at Jerry for taking his table at a restaurant.
- Barbara Boxer, Kirsten Gillibrand, John McCain, Orrin Hatch, Cory Booker, and Madeleine Albright: Appeared in the Season 7 episode "Ms. Ludgate-Dwyer Goes to Washington." The first five, all members of the United States Senate, were shown listening to Leslie promote the National Parks. Madeleine Albright appeared eating breakfast with Leslie, giving Leslie advice how to handle April.

=== Entertainers ===
- John Cena: appeared as a guest on Andy's show in the Season 7 episode "The Johnny Karate Super Awesome Musical Explosion Show."
- Ginuwine: Donna's cousin that appeared as himself in the Season 6 finale "Moving Up" and the Season 7 episode "Donna & Joe."
- Peter Serafinowicz: appeared as Lord Edgar Covington in the Season 6 episode "London (Part 1)" and the Season 7 episode "The Johnny Karate Super Awesome Musical Explosion Show."
