= The Possum =

- Parks and Recreation episode
- Episode no.: Season 2 Episode 18
- Directed by: Tristram Shapeero
- Written by: Mike Scully
- Original air date: March 11, 2010

Guest appearances
- Colter Allison as Maintenance Worker; Alison Becker as Shauna Malwae-Tweep; Colton Dunn as Brett; Lyle Kanouse as Joe Campopiano; Judith Moreland as Evelyn Roushland; Jim O'Heir as Jerry Gergich; Paul Raci as Eugene; Retta as Donna Meagle; Harris Wittels as Harris

Episode chronology
← Previous "Woman of the Year"	Next → "Park Safety"
- Parks and Recreation season 2

"The Possum" is the 18th episode of the second season of the American comedy television series Parks and Recreation, and the 24th overall episode of the series. It originally aired on NBC in the United States on March 11, 2010. In the episode, Leslie forms a task force to capture an opossum that bit the mayor's dog, but she begins to fear she has caught the wrong animal.

The episode was written by Mike Scully and directed by Tristram Shapeero. "The Possum" featured a guest appearance by Alison Becker, who reprised her previous guest role as reporter Shauna Malwae-Tweep. Supporting character Ron Swanson is revealed to have a large woodshop in "The Possum", which was inspired by actor Nick Offerman's real-life carpentry skills.

According to Nielsen Media Research, "The Possum" was seen by 4.6 million viewers. Its rating among viewers between ages 18 and 49 constituted a nine percent drop from the previous week's episode, "Woman of the Year". "The Possum" received generally positive reviews.

== Plot ==
After the infamous possum, "Fairway Frank" bites Mayor Gunderson's dog at a golf course, mayoral representative Evelyn asks Leslie to form a task force to capture it. Leslie, Tom, Andy and two incompetent animal control workers, Harris and Brett go to the golf course and quickly find the animal. The animal control workers are useless and Tom immediately runs away, but Andy dives toward the animal and captures it. Evelyn is impressed with Leslie and promises her a special favor from the mayor's office. However, Leslie sees a second opossum and fears they have captured the wrong animal. She later finds out that the mayor doesn't care about catching Fairway Frank, but rather about securing a trophy animal for his bathroom.

Back at the department office, reporter Shauna Malwae-Tweep interviews Andy for a newspaper article. After he brags about the capture, the reporter suggests his heroics might win him back the affections of Ann, his ex-girlfriend, much to Andy's excitement. April, who has romantic feelings for Andy, overhears this and leaves jealously. Evelyn demands delivery of Fairway Frank. Leslie responds that there is uncertainty about the identity of Fairway Frank. She refuses to hand over the captured opossum and creates a ketchup-blood diversion so that April can escape with the caged animal.

Leslie and April take the opossum to Ann's home, where April has been paid $50 to housesit. April lets the opossum out of its cage, and it causes havoc and minor damage. While hiding from the animal, April reveals her feelings about Andy to Leslie for the first time. When Leslie refuses to hand over the opossum, Evelyn angrily takes back her promise of a favor from the mayor's office. Andy, still oblivious to the reasons behind April's jealousy, delivers coffee to April, as well as the day's newspaper, containing a story which credits April for providing moral support to Andy. It is later revealed that Leslie has donated the opossum to the Pawnee zoo.

Meanwhile, Ron plans a woodshop expansion in his home and seeks the approval of city planner Mark. Mark informs Ron that an inspection is needed to ensure that the facility meets all current zoning code standards, and an obviously lying Ron claims it does, clearly underscoring his vexation with governmental regulations. During the inspection, Mark finds numerous code violations, including oily rags placed above a wood-burning fireplace and a long-outdated fire extinguisher. Later, Mark takes a half-day off so that he can help his friend's woodshop meet city code. Ron thanks Mark by building a wooden canoe and leaving it in his office.

== Production ==
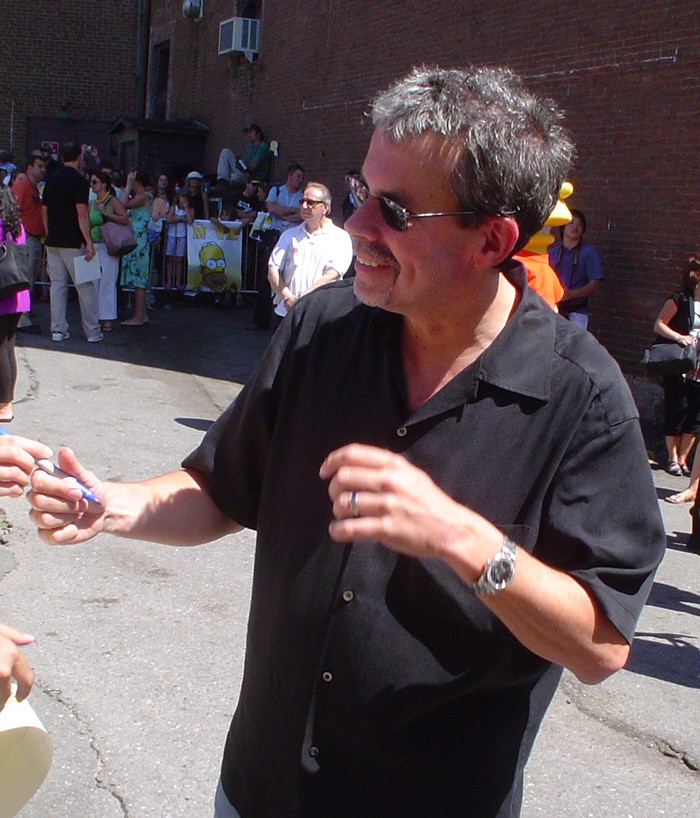
"The Possum" was written by Mike Scully (pictured).

"The Possum" was written by Mike Scully and directed by Tristram Shapeero. Some commentators said the main plotline involving the opossum served as an allegory for capital punishment. The episode featured actress and comedian Alison Becker in a guest appearance as Pawnee Journal reporter Shauna Malwae-Tweep. The actress and character first appeared in the first season episode "The Reporter", in which she had sex with Mark, which Andy bluntly recollects upon first seeing Shauna in "The Possum". Rashida Jones appears only in the opening and closing scenes of "The Possum" because she was filming scenes for David Fincher's film The Social Network.

In "The Possum", Ron is revealed to have a very large woodshop. This element of Ron's character was inspired by actor Nick Offerman, who in addition to comedy runs an independent carpentry business called Offerman Woodshop. This was also referenced in the previous second season episode "Sweetums", in which Ron builds a harp from scratch to prove to Leslie he is not intoxicated. During one scene, Leslie shows a list of the Pawnee Parks Department's Most Wanted Pests, which includes several raccoons. This is a reference to a running gag, established from the series, that Pawnee has a terrible raccoon infestation problem. Shortly after "The Possum" originally aired, a downloadable PDF file was made available on NBC's "City of Pawnee" website of the most wanted pests list, which included images of the 10 most animals including raccoons, the opossum, a bat, a feral cat and a crow. The site also included a PDF file of the front page of the fictional newspaper's The Pawnee Journal, which included the newspaper article referenced in the episode about Andy's capture of the opossum. A printed copy of the newspaper article can be seen taped to the wall of Andy's shoeshine stand in the subsequent episode, "Park Safety".

== Cultural references ==
While visiting a golf course, Tom said he used to love golf pro Tiger Woods, until his extramarital affairs scandal was revealed, and then he considered him a god. One of the raccoons featured on a list of Pawnee's Most Wanted Pests List was named Zorro, a reference to the sword-wielding title character of several books, films and television programs. Another pest is named "Jangle Bo Jangles", a reference to the pop song "Mr. Bojangles".

== Reception ==
In its original American NBC broadcast on March 11, 2010, "The Possum" was seen by 4.6 million viewers, according to Nielsen Media Research. Although it was the same number of viewers as last week's episode, "Woman of the Year", "The Possum" had a 2.1 rating/6 share among viewers between ages 18 and 49, a nine percent drop from the previous episode. In the 9 p.m. timeslot on March 11, Parks and Recreation was outperformed by American Idol on Fox, which drew 20.46 million viewers, and Survivor: Heroes vs. Villains on CBS, which drew 12.17 million viewers. "The Possum" outperformed a repeat of Grey's Anatomy on ABC, which drew 4.5 million viewers, and The Vampire Diaries on The CW, which drew 1.37 million viewers.

"The Possum" was "Parks & Rec" clicking on all levels: broad physical comedy (various bits with the possum), political satire (the possum case turning into a death penalty allegory), romantic tension (April falling even more for Andy, and Leslie finding out), and just the characters being themselves.

— Alan Sepinwall,
The Star-Ledger

The episode received generally positive reviews. Alan Sepinwall, television columnist with The Star-Ledger, said the episode featured strong physical comedy, political satire, romantic tension and character moments. He said he "loved virtually every beat of the possum story" and finds the developing Andy and April relationship funny and believable. Entertainment Weekly writer Sandra Gonzalez said "The Possum" was a very funny episode, and particularly praised the development of the Andy and April relationship. She said Plaza and Pratt did some of their best work to date in the episode.

Matt Fowler of IGN praised the April and Andy relationship and the subplot with Ron and Mark, although he claimed Ron was the funnier of the duo and Mark's character is too normal and boring for the show. Fowler also liked the way Leslie's political ambition conflicted with her conscience in the episode. New York magazine writer Steve Kandell praised the main plotline with Leslie and the performances by Pratt and Offerman, particularly praising the jokes surrounding Ron's woodworking hobby. Kandell pointed out the episode did not suffer from Ann's absence and suggested although Rashida Jones is charming, the show does not need her. Leonard Pierce of The A.V. Club said the episode's main story was "a bit of a trifle" and the subplots were lacking, but that "The Possum" included several laughs and demonstrated Ron and Leslie's opposing attitudes about local government.

== DVD release ==
"The Possum", along with the other 23 second season episodes of Parks and Recreation, was released on a four-disc DVD set in the United States on November 30, 2010. The DVD included deleted scenes for each episode.
