= Galentine's Day (2010 Parks and Recreation episode) =

- Parks and Recreation episode
- Episode no.: Season 2 Episode 16
- Directed by: Ken Kwapis
- Written by: Michael Schur
- Original air date: February 11, 2010

Guest appearances
- Andrew Burlinson as Wyatt "Burly" Burlinson; Josh Duvendeck as Ben; John Larroquette as Frank Beckerson; Blake Lee as Derek; Jim O'Heir as Jerry Gergich; Pamela Reed as Marlene Griggs-Knope; Retta as Donna Meagle; Mark Rivers as Drummer; Justin Theroux as Justin Anderson; Jama Williamson as Wendy Haverford; Alan Yang as Bassist

Episode chronology
← Previous "Sweetums"	Next → "Woman of the Year"
- Parks and Recreation season 2

"Galentine's Day" is the 16th episode of the second season of the American comedy television series Parks and Recreation, and the 22nd overall episode of the series. It originally aired on NBC in the United States on February 11, 2010. In the episode, Leslie and her boyfriend Justin seek to reunite Leslie's mother, Marlene, with her teenage flame. Meanwhile, April's feelings for Andy continue to bloom, while Ann appears to be growing apart from Mark.

The episode was written by series co-creator Michael Schur and directed by Ken Kwapis. "Galentine's Day" featured a guest appearance by John Larroquette as Frank Beckerson, the long-lost love of Marlene Griggs-Knope, who was played by Pamela Reed. It also featured the last in a string of guest performances by Justin Theroux as Leslie's love interest, Justin Anderson.

According to Nielsen Media Research, "Galentine's Day" was seen by 4.98 million household viewers, which marked a continued improvement in ratings for the series. It tied a record set with the previous episode, "Sweetums", for the season's highest rating among viewers aged 18 to 49. The episode received generally positive reviews, and the fictional holiday has become revered and celebrated in the years after the show's airing.

Galentine's is a portmanteau of gal, a variation of the word girl, and Valentine's.

== Plot summary ==
Leslie throws her annual "Galentine's Day" party for her female friends, celebrated the day before Valentine's Day. She asks her mother, Marlene, to tell the story about how she fell in love with a lifeguard that saved her from drowning in 1968, but the two had to break it off over objections from Marlene's parents. Leslie later tells the story to Justin, who is amazed by the tale and wants to unite the two. He tracks down Marlene's old flame, Frank Beckerson, and convinces Leslie to go with him to Illinois and reunite the two on Valentine's Day at the Senior Center Valentine's Dance, which the parks department oversees.

Leslie and Justin meet Frank, a strange and depressed man who has constant panic attacks. Leslie begins to have doubts about bringing him to her mother and tries to call it off, but Justin insists that they should "let this unfold". At the dance, where Andy's band Mouse Rat is playing, Frank meets up with Marlene, who is repulsed by Frank's past, current unemployment and overall failure at life. She turns down his offer at a second chance at love, prompting him to storm onto the stage and denounce her over the microphone. Leslie apologizes to her mother for bringing Frank. She is later upset with Justin, but has trouble pinpointing the reasons for her dissatisfaction. Ron explains that Justin is a "tourist", meaning that he takes "vacations in people's lives" and only cares about telling interesting stories to impress other people, which makes him selfish. Two older women then recognize Ron as jazz saxophonist Duke Silver, but he denies it. Leslie later breaks up with Justin, which Tom takes especially hard, reacting as if his parents were getting divorced.

Before the senior dance, Tom invites his ex-wife Wendy to his office to finally disclose his romantic feelings for her, but she rejects him. Not satisfied with the outcome, he attempts to blackmail her into a date using an alimony lawsuit as leverage. Tom and Wendy are later shown hugging and presumably making amends, although their conversation remains inaudible. Meanwhile, April's boyfriend Derek and his boyfriend Ben mock the senior citizens, causing April to question why their interactions must constantly be "cloaked in, like, 15 layers of irony". They accuse her of "lameness", which they attribute to spending time with Andy, and provide her with several ultimatums. She breaks up with them in response. Ann and Mark, at the same time, celebrate their first Valentine's Day together. In an interview with the camera crew, Ann describes the relationship as "good", but her tone of voice and body language around Mark contradict her statements. She later becomes jealous when Andy dedicates a song to April, even going so far as to question April about the possibility of a budding relationship between April and Andy, to which April responds impatiently.

== Production ==
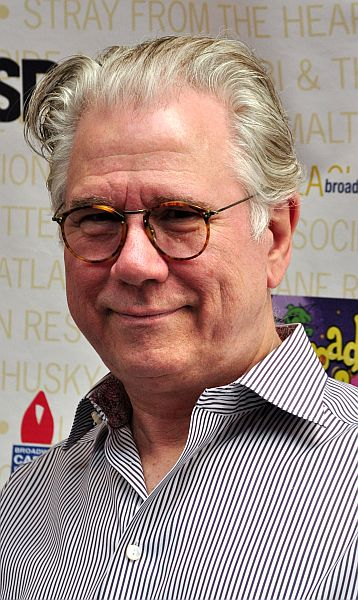
John Larroquette portrays Frank Beckerson in this episode, "Galentine's Day"

"Galentine's Day" was written by series co-creator Michael Schur and directed by Ken Kwapis. The episode featured a guest appearance by John Larroquette as Frank Beckerson, the long-lost love of Leslie's mother, Marlene Knope. When Parks and Recreation co-creator Greg Daniels announced the casting in January 2010, he described Larroquette's character as "He's the one who got away." "Galentine's Day" also included an appearance by Pamela Reed, who has played Marlene Knope in several episodes, and the last of a string of slated guest appearances by Justin Theroux as Justin Anderson, a love interest for Leslie. The episode marked the return of Andy's band, "Mouse Rat", which was previously featured in the first season finale "Rock Show". His bandmates are played by Mark Rivers (drums), Andrew Burlinson (guitar) and Alan Yang (bass), the latter of whom serves as a screenwriter for Parks and Recreation.

== Cultural references ==
At the dance, a senior citizen approaches Ron Swanson and asks for an autograph from Duke Silver. This is a reference to the previous second season episode, "Practice Date", which establishes Ron's secret identity as a jazz musician. Leslie referred to her Galentine's Day breakfast tradition as "Lilith Fair minus the angst and plus frittatas", a reference to the concert tour and traveling music festival. She also said the love story between Marlene and Frank makes the 2004 romance film The Notebook look like the 2008 horror film Saw V. Mark gets Ann a necklace similar to the Heart of the Ocean, the fictional jewelry given to Kate Winslet's character in the 1997 romantic drama film, Titanic. During one scene in "Galentine's Day", Leslie does a voice impersonation of U.S. President John F. Kennedy. When Tom mistakes the impression for that of the Arnold Schwarzenegger character Terminator, he prompts Leslie to do that impression as well.

Among the songs performed by Mouse Rat in "Galentine's Day" were "The Way You Look Tonight", originally performed by Fred Astaire in the 1936 film, Swing Time. Andy's bandmate suggests he sings the "Let's Call the Whole Thing Off" more like jazz musician and trumpeter Louis Armstrong, who Andy admits he has never heard of. Andy and his band also performs "I Only Have Eyes for You" and "I've Got You Under My Skin". At the end of the evening one of the senior citizens corners Andy and tells him that he "sounds like Dean Martin", who Andy has also never heard of. Leslie said reuniting Marlene and Frank would be like reuniting Romeo and Juliet, the protagonists of the William Shakespeare play of the same name, or reuniting actress Jennifer Aniston and actor Brad Pitt. She also warns to the camera for Aniston to "stay away from John Mayer", the musician who previously dated Aniston. In the days prior to the original broadcast of "Galentine's Day", Mayer publicly apologized for a number of explicit sexual and racial comments he had made in the past months, which prompted news outlets to praise Parks and Recreation for the timeliness of their Mayer joke. In May 2011, Jennifer Aniston started dating Justin Theroux, who guest starred in the episode, and they later married. Frank made a reference to a recurring gag from Arrested Development when, after being rejected, he announced to Marlene, "take one last look...because you'll never see this body again."

== Reception ==
And I think this far into the show's run, Schur and company have earned the right to do an episode like this, one that still had plenty of funny stuff [...] but that showed how seriously the show takes its characters, and how rich so many of them have become.

— Alan Sepinwall
The Star-Ledger

In its original American NBC broadcast on February 11, 2010, "Galentine's Day" was seen by 4.98 million households, according to Nielsen Media Research. This marked a continued recent improvement in ratings for the series. "Galentine's Day" was seen by more viewers than the previous week's episode "Sweetums", which drew 4.87 million viewers and was an itself an increase from previous episodes. "Galentine's Day" drew an overall 3.1 rating/5 share, and a 2.3 rating/6 share among viewers between 18 and 49, the latter of which tied with "Sweetums" as the highest of its age group for the series. The subsequent episode, "Woman of the Year", would also tie the two episodes for a series-high rating in that 18 to 49 age group.

"Galentine's Day" received generally positive reviews. Entertainment Weekly writer Sandra Gonzalez said, "The show managed to cram more character development into 22 minutes than I thought possible. Almost every couple had a major milestone of sorts last night." Gonzalez complimented the acting of Aziz Ansari during his moments with Wendy, and praised the "touching moment" between Ron and Leslie when she realized she had to break up with Justin. Steve Kandell of New York magazine appreciated that Leslie was correct about Frank, and that Justin was the ignorant one. Kandell said the senior dance served as a "poignant backdrop" for the episode's romantic subplots, but said the most intriguing show's relationship is between Leslie and Ron. Alan Sepinwall, television columnist with The Star-Ledger, said the episode was funny, but focused more attention on advancing various romantic subplots. Sepinwall said the scenes about Ann and Mark were "a nice reaction to the general blandness of that relationship", but found it "frustrating" that the episode left the reason for Wendy and Tom's resolution unclear.

Steve Heisler of The A.V. Club praised the episode for displaying some of Leslie's stronger and more competent aspects, which he said makes audiences "much more willing to put up with her many, many eccentricities". Heisler said he thought the Leslie and Justin relationship ended appropriately and praised Ansari's performance, but added he was a little "taken aback" by how rudely Tom treated Wendy. Matt Fowler of IGN said the episode had many funny moments and good character development, but he said some of the romantic relationships risked skewing the balance between "the sweet and the absurd", and that some of the character moments "played out a bit too jarringly real for a show like this". Kona Gallagher of TV Squad said she would like to see Leslie get a boyfriend who last longer than three episodes, unlike Justin Theroux and Louis C.K., who played Leslie's love interest Dave Sanderson earlier in the season. Gallagher praised Andy's band and the befuddlement with which Andy reacted to the senior citizen audience. Mike Murphy of The Press Democrat said the episode was funny, and he particularly praised the "hilariously whacked-out" performance of John Laroquette. Several commentators praised the joke about Andy's new rock song "Sex Hair", about how one can tell whether someone had sex because their hair is matted.

== Public reception ==
"Galentine's Day" has transcended the television screen and become established in everyday culture. On February 13, Galentine's Day, a nonofficial holiday, is celebrated as a day for "ladies celebrating ladies". Businesses such as Sprinkles Cupcakes, Lyft, Shari's Berries, 4KIDS, and Target promoted the holiday on Twitter in 2017, with Target even selling Galentine's Day themed products. Awareness of the holiday spread thanks to social media, with #GalentinesDay trending on Twitter, Instagram, and Tumblr on February 13, 2017, seven years after the original episode aired.

== DVD release ==
"Galentine's Day", along with the other 23 second-season episodes of Parks and Recreation, was released on a four-disc DVD set in the United States on November 30, 2010. The DVD included deleted scenes for each episode.
