= Leslie's House =

- Parks and Recreation episode
- Episode no.: Season 2 Episode 14
- Directed by: Alex Hardcastle
- Written by: Daniel J. Goor
- Original air date: January 21, 2010

Guest appearances
- Josh Duvendeck as Ben; Bonita Friedericy as Maria Portlesman; Blake Lee as Derek; Jim O'Heir as Jerry Gergich; Stewart Skelton as Phil; Justin Theroux as Justin Anderson; Jama Williamson as Wendy Haverford

Episode chronology
| ← Previous "The Set Up" | Next → "Sweetums" |
- Parks and Recreation season 2

"Leslie's House" is the 14th episode of the second season of the American comedy television series Parks and Recreation, and the twentieth overall episode of the series. It originally aired on NBC in the United States on January 21, 2010. In the episode, Leslie holds a dinner party to impress her boyfriend Justin, but ends up recruiting town employees and potentially abusing her government power.

The episode was written by Daniel J. Goor and directed by Alex Hardcastle. The episode also continued a story arc involving Justin Theroux as Leslie's boyfriend, which began in the previous episode. According to Nielsen Media Research, "Leslie's House" was seen by 4.35 million viewers, a slight drop from the previous episode, "The Set Up". The episode received generally positive reviews.

== Plot ==
A remorseful Leslie tells a group of Recreation Center teachers the Pawnee budget has been cut by $1,000, and five of their classes will have to be cut, but exactly which classes has not yet been determined. Later, Leslie and Justin Anderson, who have been dating for weeks, have another excellent date in Indianapolis. At the end of the night, they decide their next date will be in Pawnee, and Leslie feels pressure to make their date equally exciting. While talking later with Ann, Leslie decides to host a dinner party at her home with all her interesting friends. She invites Mark, Tom and Ron, specifically excludes Jerry, and asks Andy to work as the waiter. Andy agrees, even though he hates Justin, Ann's former crush, and Mark, her current boyfriend.

Ann comes to Leslie's house, and finds it full of stacks of boxes, papers and garbage. When they find themselves unable to clean it, Leslie calls Maria Portlesman, who teaches cleaning courses at the recreation center. She declines payment and hints she would prefer preferential treatment when Leslie cuts the classes, despite Leslie's assurance this will not happen. When Leslie realizes she has not prepared any food for the party, she calls a culinary teacher from the recreation center. Later, at the party, Andy complains about Justin to April, who makes Andy happy when she proposes putting chewed up gum in Justin's pockets. Eventually, Tom's ex-wife Wendy arrives. Tom expresses anger that Leslie invited her, especially because Ron is romantically interested in her. When Ron impresses Wendy by eating a hot red pepper, Tom attempts to eat a bigger one, but has to run to the bathroom in pain immediately. When Justin starts yawning, a worried Leslie calls in other recreation center teachers to make the party more interesting, including a belly-dancer, a fencer, a caricaturist and an origami teacher.

Eventually, an accounting teacher arrives, believing demonstrations are being held to determine which class will be cut, much to the anger of Ron. The teacher gives a very boring accounting lecture, which puts Justin to sleep. The next day, Leslie is before the Pawnee Disciplinary Committee on charges of abuse of power. Leslie calls Justin as a witness and questions him as to whether he enjoyed the party, to which he answers an emphatic yes. Afterward, the committee rules no further action will be taken, mainly because Leslie turned herself in and paid $1,000 restitution to the recreation center so no classes would be cut. When Ann asks why she did it, Leslie said it was to get an honest answer from Justin about the date, under penalty of perjury. The episode ends with Justin encouraging Tom to ask Wendy out.

== Production ==
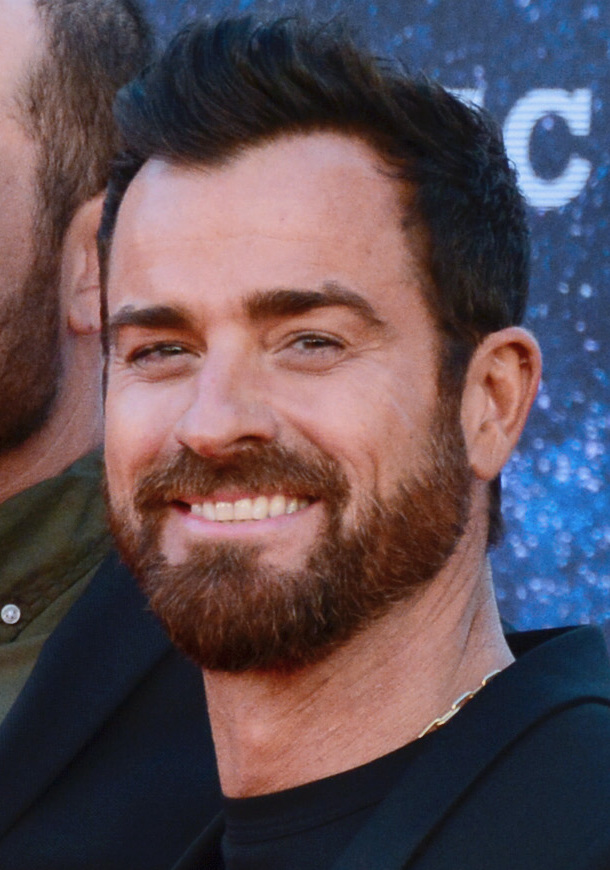
Justin Theroux (pictured) made a guest appearance as Justin, a love interest for Leslie Knope.

"Leslie's House" was written by Daniel J. Goor and directed by Alex Hardcastle. It featured one of a string of slated guest appearances by Justin Theroux as Justin, a love interest for Leslie. The episode also featured Jama Williamson in her recurring role as Wendy, the soon-to-be ex-wife of Tom. "Leslie's House" satirizes government officials abusing their positions of power for personal gain, marking a continuation throughout the second season to feature more topical storylines.

== Cultural references ==
While discussing how behind the times Pawnee is, Tom said residents are now only starting to become interested in the rock band Nirvana. Tom said, "I don't have the heart to tell them what's going to happen to Kurt Cobain in 1994", a reference to the suicide of the band's lead singer. Before Tom eats a hot pepper at the dinner party, he sings, "This is how you eat it" to the tune of the 1995 Montell Jordan song "This Is How We Do It". Leslie said she was saving an old newspaper because it had the "first rumblings of Iran-Contra", a reference to the scandal in which U.S. figures facilitated the sale of arms to Iran. Tom visits Wikipedia, the free online encyclopedia, to learn more about India when quizzed by Justin.

== Reception ==
In its original American NBC broadcast on January 21, 2010, "Leslie's House" was seen by 4.35 million viewers, according to Nielsen Media Research. It was a more than five percent drop in viewership from the previous week's episode, "The Set Up". "Leslie's House" drew a 2.0 rating/5 share among viewers aged between 18 and 49. The episode received generally positive reviews. Alan Sepinwall, television columnist with The Star-Ledger, said the episode was very funny and farcical, but grounded in reality enough to keep it from being too unbelievable or over-the-top. Sepinwall said Mark was funnier than he is in most episodes, and said there was good development in the subplots between April and Andy, as well as the blossoming love triangle between Ron, Tom and Wendy.

Entertainment Weekly writer Sandra Gonzalez said she liked the pairing of Poehler and Theroux, but found "Leslie's House" slower than previous episodes, and felt the comedic talents of Ansari and Offerman were underused. Matt Fowler of IGN praised the episode for its use of a wide range of characters to provide humor, saying "Everyone got a chance to shine in this episode. They all took turns giving us a laugh and 'Leslie's House' was a tremendous example of this series firing on all cylinders." Steve Kandell of New York magazine praised the episode's satirical bent about elected officials. Steve Heisler of The A.V. Club favorably compared "Leslie's House" to "Dinner Party", an episode of The Office, the other comedy series created by Parks co-creator Greg Daniels. However, he said "Leslie's House" was different in that her friends were willing to attend her party and help her out, whereas in the Office episode, the characters did not want to attend the dinner party held by protagonist Michael Scott. Heisler said the fact that the characters liked each other so much in Parks and Recreation differentiated itself from the other series in a positive way.

== DVD release ==
"Leslie's House", along with the other 23 second season episodes of Parks and Recreation, was released on a four-disc DVD set in the United States on November 30, 2010. The DVD included deleted scenes for each episode.
