= Summer Catalog =

- Parks and Recreation episode
- Episode no.: Season 2 Episode 20
- Directed by: Ken Whittingham
- Written by: Katie Dippold
- Original air date: March 25, 2010

Guest appearances
- Michael Gross as Michael Tansley; Dakin Matthews as David Moser; Mike Mauloff as Bouncer; Jim O'Heir as Jerry Gergich; Retta as Donna Meagle; Ana Rey as Marta; Jack Wallace as Clarence Carrington; Meg Wolf as Woman

Episode chronology
← Previous "Park Safety"	Next → "94 Meetings"
- Parks and Recreation season 2

"Summer Catalog" is the 20th episode of the second season of the American comedy television series Parks and Recreation, and the 26th overall episode of the series. It originally aired on NBC in the United States on March 25, 2010. In the episode, Leslie organizes a reunion with the last four Pawnee park directors, but is disappointed when it turns out they despise each other. Meanwhile, Tom tries to take a photo of Ann and Mark for the city's summer catalog, while the budding relationship of Andy and April continues to develop.

The episode was written by Katie Dippold and directed by Ken Whittingham. It featured a guest appearance by Michael Gross, best known for his role as Steven Keaton from Family Ties, as one of the former park directors. According to Nielsen Media Research, "Summer Catalog" was seen by 4.47 million household viewers. It suffered competition from CBS footage of the first round of the 2010 NCAA Men's Division I Basketball Tournament, which drew 9.68 million household viewers. "Summer Catalog" received generally positive reviews.

== Plot ==
While working on the Pawnee summer catalog, Leslie excitedly organizes a reunion between Ron and his three predecessors. She anticipates a joyous occasion and plans to write a letter about it for the catalog. However, none of the four men get along with each other, and all of them are difficult to get along with. One of them litters repeatedly, treats everybody disrespectfully, and cheerfully says he never gave a damn about the Parks department and only took the job because it had an easy path to job security and a lucrative pension. Another one exhibits a sexist attitude, and tells Leslie she should not be working there due to menstruation issues. The third constantly talks about his affinity for marijuana, going so far as to say "I've planted marijuana in community gardens across this city," and particularly clashes with Ron (who forced him out of the position years ago) who cheerfully confirms he screwed his predecessor over and otherwise is his usual detached self. Later, a frustrated Leslie decides she cannot write the catalog letter; she stops treating the former directors with any respect by telling the sexist to shut up and calling them "turds" when she briefly takes a throwaway picture and then walks away from them without another word. Ron takes her out to dinner to apologize, and the two process their mutual respect, and vow they will never grow to hate each other the way the four former directors do. Ron even tells Leslie that he wants her to take over his Parks Director position if he becomes Pawnee's City Manager. However, Ron cheerfully says in an interview that one of his first acts as City Manager would be to eliminate the Parks department, while Leslie gives an equally upbeat interview where she says one of her first acts as City Manager, were she to leapfrog Ron for the job, would be to double the department's size.

Tom is tasked with taking the cover photo of the summer catalog, and convinces Ann and Mark to pose for photos at a community park. Tom is repeatedly frustrated with Ann, who has a difficult time appearing happy. When the photos are finished, Ann agrees that she looks miserable and asks that the pictures not be used. Mark appears concerned that Ann's unhappiness is a reflection of their relationship. She insists everything is fine, but he is unconvinced. Meanwhile, April and Andy appear to be growing closer. After helping Leslie set up her picnic, Andy asks whether April wants to get drinks after work, and she agrees. However, when they arrive at a bar, the bouncer easily notices April is underage, and her identification confirms she is 20. April tells Andy they can go to another bar, but Andy decides to go home instead, seemingly uncomfortable about their age difference. April is visibly disappointed, but does not convey it to Andy. Later, the summer catalogs arrive, with a photo on the cover of April and Andy appearing happy together at the picnic.

== Production ==
"Summer Catalog" was written by Katie Dippold and directed by Ken Whittingham. The character Michael Tansley, one of the former parks directors, was played by guest actor Michael Gross, best known for his role as Steven Keaton from Family Ties. At the end of the episode, Leslie and Ron have dinner at J.J.'s Diner, an eatery previously featured in the first season episode "The Reporter". Although the exterior shots of the restaurant are the same, the interior set of the diner is a completely different one from the other episode.

Shortly after the episode aired, a copy of the Pawnee Summer Catalog 2010 that was featured in the episode was made available for download on the official Parks and Recreation website. The map of Pawnee contained within the catalog is based on the map of central Christchurch, New Zealand. Within a week of the episode's original broadcast, two deleted scenes from "Summer Catalog" were made available on the official Parks and Recreation website. In the first, a two-minute clip, April and Andy flirt while walking along a trail to set up Leslie's picnic. When April complains about her feet hurting, Andy volunteers to give her a piggyback ride. Later, Leslie tries to write her summer catalog letter based on the picnic, but struggles due to how rude the four men acted. The second clip, which lasted two minutes and 15 seconds, includes further scenes of Tom leading Ann and Mark through a photo shoot at the park. Tom forces them to enter into unusual, avant-garde poses, and yells at young children who get in the way of the shot while playing.

== Cultural references ==
Leslie compares the summer catalog to the Pawnee version of Vogue, a fashion and lifestyle magazine. During one scene, Tom makes a joke, then says, "Am I right, Justin?" The line is a reference to Leslie's stylish ex-boyfriend Justin, played by actor Justin Theroux earlier in the season, who Tom desperately admired. When Jerry takes a bad picture for the catalog, he indicates he will use the graphics software Adobe Photoshop to change the image, prompting April to ask, "Can you Photoshop your life with better decisions, Jerry?" During the picnic, when Andy and April are talking, Andy talks about writing a song called "Life is a Picnic”. Andy makes a reference to NFL quarterback Peyton Manning.

== Reception ==
In its original American broadcast on March 25, 2010, "Summer Catalog" was seen by 4.47 million household viewers, according to Nielsen Media Research. For the second week in a row, the show suffered in comparison to CBS footage of the 2010 NCAA Men's Division I Basketball Tournament, which drew an average of 9.68 million household viewers during Parks and Recreation's 8:30 p.m. time-slot. Also for the second consecutive week, Parks and Recreation was outperformed by the ABC drama series FlashForward, which drew 6.2 million household viewers. "Summer Catalog" had an overall 2.9 rating/6 share, and a 3/1 rating/11 share among adult viewers between ages 18 and 49.

Of the four NBC sitcoms on last night, I got the most pleasure from Parks and Recreation. It's a measure of just how terrific P&R has become that even when it breaks its format with a mostly-outdoors episode, it still moves its ongoing story lines along briskly and provides a constant stream — a babbling brook, in Leslie Knopes' case — of laughs.

— Ken Tucker,
Entertainment Weekly

"Summer Catalog" received generally positive reviews. Alan Sepinwall, television columnist with The Star-Ledger, called the episode a "nice character piece for most of the ensemble", and said it demonstrated how much Leslie has developed as a character since the first season. He praised the jokes about Ron's hunger and the scenes with Tom's demanding photography sessions. Entertainment Weekly television writer Ken Tucker said the storylines moved along briskly, provided a "constant stream of laughs" and displayed the "rich texture" of the characters. Tucker also said the romances in Parks and Recreation were more believable than contemporary ones in shows like The Office and 30 Rock.

Matt Fowler of IGN called it a "particularly strong" episode that used all of the characters well. Fowler especially liked that although Ron and Leslie bickered throughout the episode, they still displayed a mutual respect. He also said Tom's photography sessions were a good way to display Ann and Mark's deteriorating relationship. The A.V. Club writer Steve Heisler said "Summer Catalog" laid the foundation for several future developments, like changes to the Andy/April and Mark/Ann relationships, but also kept the episode funny and enjoyable. Heisler said Tom had the best lines of the episode. Kona Gallagher of TV Squad said she was saddened by the decline in Mark and Ann's relationship and the setback for the April and Andy courtship, and feared the subplot might not reach a satisfactory conclusion by the end of the season. Gallagher also said the main-plot with Leslie and the former park heads was predictable, and that guest star Michael Gross was underused.

== DVD release ==
"Summer Catalog", along with the other 23 second season episodes of Parks and Recreation, was released on a four-disc DVD set in the United States on November 30, 2010. The DVD included deleted scenes for each episode.
