= Woman of the Year (Parks and Recreation) =

- Parks and Recreation episode
- Episode no.: Season 2 Episode 17
- Directed by: Jason Woliner
- Written by: Norm Hiscock
- Original air date: March 4, 2010

Guest appearances
- Rebecca Benson as Gogo Dancer; Andrew Burlinson as Wyatt "Burly" Burlinson; Andrea Hutchman as Lisa; Andy Milder as Freddy; Maribeth Monroe as Elise Yarktin; Jim O'Heir as Jerry Gergich; Retta as Donna Meagle; Ian Roberts as Ian Winston; Sara Sanderson as Cindi; Ben Schwartz as Jean-Ralphio Saperstein; Steve Zissis as Gray

Episode chronology
← Previous "Galentine's Day"	Next → "The Possum"
- Parks and Recreation season 2

"Woman of the Year" is the 17th episode of the second season of the American comedy television series Parks and Recreation, and the 23rd overall episode of the series. It originally aired on NBC in the United States on March 4, 2010. In the episode, Ron is presented with a woman of the year award, much to the frustration of Leslie. Meanwhile, Tom tries to seek investors in a nightclub ownership share, and April helps Andy look for an apartment.

The episode was written by Norm Hiscock and directed by Jason Woliner. The script included a theme about the political nature of local awards. "Woman of the Year" featured guest appearances by Ben Schwartz as Jean-Ralphio and Ian Roberts as Ian Winston, both of whom have appeared in the series in past episodes. Rashida Jones, a regular Parks and Recreation cast member who plays Ann Perkins, did not appear in "Woman of the Year" because she was filming scenes for the David Fincher film The Social Network.

According to Nielsen Media Research, "Woman of the Year" was seen by 4.6 million viewers, which marked a continued recent improvement in ratings for the series. It tied a record set by the previous two episodes, "Sweetums" and "Galentine's Day", for the season's highest rating among viewers aged between 18 and 49. The episode received generally positive reviews, particularly for the character moments between Leslie and Ron.

== Plot ==
The parks and recreation department receives a letter from the Pawnee chapter of the Indiana Organization of Women, which Leslie believes is her congratulatory letter as the recipient of the group's Dorothy Everton Smythe Woman of the Year award. Much to her surprise and disappointment, however, the award has actually gone to Ron in recognition of town projects Leslie primarily developed. Ron secretly acknowledges the award as a ridiculous mistake. However, he uses the mistake as an opportunity to tease Leslie before later recommending her as the award recipient. Ron constantly brags about the award, even commissioning a professional photographer to take his official portrait for the award ceremony. Eventually, Ron admits he is joking and attempts to recommend Leslie for the award. However, the IOW director reveals that a man was chosen intentionally as a gimmick to garner attention. Frustrated with the politics of the awards, Leslie and Ron plan for him to make a disparaging acceptance speech condemning the awards. However, at the ceremony itself, Ron instead publicly presents the award to Leslie, to the frustration of the IOW director and members. The next day's newspaper proclaims Ron the winner, with Leslie and Ron later deciding that the award is meaningless, anyway. The plaque is thrown into a wastebasket, where Leslie later secretly retrieves it.

In a subplot, Tom drops off a temporary liquor license renewal at the Snakehole Lounge nightclub, where the owner Freddy tells him they are seeking investors who can buy a share for $10,000. Although he does not have the money, Tom reveals part-ownership in a nightclub is a longtime dream of his, so he seeks assistance from his fast-talking friend, Jean-Ralphio, who contributes $5,000. Tom has $4,000 of his own but still needs $1,000, so he seeks further help from his co-workers. Donna expresses an interest, but decides against it when she meets Jean-Ralphio, of whom she immediately declares, "I hate that guy." Meanwhile, when Andy's band-mate Burly tells Andy he can no longer live with him, April helps Andy look for an apartment. They find one near her house, prompting a smitten April to note that they can carpool to work together. But when Andy learns Tom needs $1,000, he forgoes the apartment to give Tom the money as a gift. April is surprised by the choice and disappointed with the result. In the episode's final scene, Tom is shown enjoying his nightclub part ownership, until he learns Donna has bought three shares herself.

== Production ==
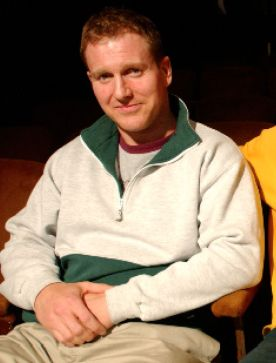
Ian Roberts (pictured), who worked with Amy Poehler on the Upright Citizens Brigade sketch comedy troupe, guest starred in "Woman of the Year".

"Woman of the Year" was written by Norm Hiscock and directed by Jason Woliner. It featured a guest appearance by Ben Schwartz as Jean-Ralphio, a fast-talking playboy character introduced in "The Set Up". The episode also featured an appearance by comedian Ian Roberts, who worked with Amy Poehler on the Upright Citizens Brigade sketch comedy troupe. Roberts guest starred as Ian Winston, the coach of a girls' soccer team who complains to Leslie about a lack of field space during the episode's cold open. Roberts previously appeared as the same character in the show's pilot episode. Rashida Jones, a regular Parks and Recreation cast member who plays Ann Perkins, did not appear in "Woman of the Year" because she was filming scenes for The Social Network, a David Fincher film about the founding of the social-networking website Facebook.

The "Woman of the Year" script included a theme about the political nature of awards, arguing despite the value and prestige people like Leslie assign to them, they are ultimately meaningless. Some commentators speculated this subplot served as a commentary about the meaninglessness of award ceremonies in the entertainment industry. "Woman of the Year" originally aired three days before the 82nd Academy Awards, prompting Entertainment Weekly to suggest it was a commentary about the Oscars, whereas others suggested the episode was a joke about how Parks and Recreation itself has failed to win any awards at the Golden Globes, Screen Actors Guild Awards or the Emmys.

Shortly after the episode aired, a copy of the "Pawnee Journal" newspaper article announcing Ron Swanson's Woman of the Year award win, which was featured within the episode, was posted in a downloadable form on the "Pawnee, Indiana" website set up by NBC.

== Cultural references ==
Although the Woman of the Year award is formally named after the fictional feminist leader Dorothy Everton Smythe, who spent four years in jail for wearing pants on a Sunday, Ron mistakenly calls it the "Dorothy Everytime Smurf Girl Trophy for Excellence in Female Stuff", a reference to the cartoon, The Smurfs. During one scene, Ron said he is attracted to strong and powerful women, prompting Leslie to point out Ron indeed attends a shocking number of Women's National Basketball Association games. When Jean Ralphio tried to make a pass at April, she replied, "Don't you work at Lady Foot Locker?", a women's footwear retailer. Ron mistakenly refers to Leslie's Camp Athena as "Camp Xena", a reference to the protagonist from the fantasy adventure television series Xena: Warrior Princess. In seeking nightclub investments from his co-workers, Tom presents a computer presentation with photos of several celebrities, including reality television stars Jon Gosselin and Nicole "Snooki" Polizzi. In defending his financial gift to Tom, Andy calls it an investment and compares himself to businessman Warren Buffett, incorrectly pronouncing the nickname like a dinner buffet. Tom aspires to open his own club called "Tom's Bistro", a reference to Jack's Bistro, the restaurant Jack Tripper opens in the 1970s and 1980s sitcom, Three's Company.

== Reception ==
In its original American NBC broadcast on March 4, 2010, "Woman of the Year" was seen by 4.6 million viewers, according to Nielsen Media Research. It drew a 2.3 rating/7 share among viewers between ages 18 and 49, matching a series-high rating in that age group shared with the episode "Sweetums" and "Galentine's Day". In overall viewers, "Woman of the Year" received a 2.9 rating/5 share. This marked a continued recent improvement in ratings for the series, especially because "Woman of the Year" performed well despite direct competition from the popular reality television singing competition American Idol, which also aired during its time period.

I wouldn't say that this past week's Parks and Recreation was a stand-out, but it did offer up a lot of great character moments between Ron and Leslie which culminated in another warm reciprocation of respect and admiration, along the lines of the superior episodes "Sweetums" and "Hunting Trip".

— Matt Fowler, IGN

"Woman of the Year" received generally positive reviews. Sandra Gonzalez of Entertainment Weekly called "Woman of the Year" one of the best episodes of the second season, particularly complimenting the one-liner jokes and ensemble cast performances. Gonzalez said she particularly liked the "big brother-little sister vibe" between Leslie and Ron. The Star-Ledger television columnist Alan Sepinwall said "Woman of the Year" was well-executed because revealing to the viewers that Ron was going to tease Leslie made his pranks more humorous and less mean-spirited. Sepinwall also said the episode had several good moments for the supporting characters, including Andy's selfless act toward Tom and Donna's purchase of shares with the nightclub. The A.V. Club writer Steve Heisler said he liked that Ron genuinely cares for Leslie. Heisler said: "If he resented Leslie as much as he hinted at during season one, it'd become an ongoing thorn in the show's foot that during every single episode. [...] Getting along is underrated in comedy."

Steve Kandell of New York magazine said the episode felt like "a bit of a place-holder" compared to other episodes in the season, but that "Woman of the Year" included amusing scenes and introduced new ways to mock bureaucracy "without ever feeling like the sly satire it secretly is". Kandell also said he enjoyed the jokes at Leslie's and Jerry's expense. Kona Gallagher of TV Squad said every character was at their best, and that he particularly enjoyed Ron's taunting of Leslie once it was made clear he was only joking. Gallagher said the "only thing about this episode I didn't love" was the way the subplot involving Tom's investment with the nightclub ended, because she felt it "started off strong, but kind of went nowhere." Matt Fowler of IGN said the episode was not a stand-out, but offered great character moments between Leslie and Ron. Fowler said Tom's desire to live like a hip hop mogul was funny "but not always engaging", and that he enjoyed the "little moments" between Andy and April.

== DVD release ==
"Woman of the Year", along with the other 23 second-season episodes of Parks and Recreation, was released on a four-disc DVD set in the United States on November 30, 2010. The DVD included deleted scenes for each episode. It also included a commentary track for "Woman of the Year" featuring Amy Poehler, Nick Offerman, Chris Pratt, Aubrey Plaza, Jim O'Heir, Retta and series co-creator Michael Schur.
