= Parks and Recreation season 2 =

Parks and Recreation
- Season 2
- DVD cover art
- Showrunner: Michael Schur
- Starring: Amy Poehler; Rashida Jones; Paul Schneider; Aziz Ansari; Nick Offerman; Aubrey Plaza; Chris Pratt
- No. of episodes: 24

Release
- Original network: NBC
- Original release: September 17, 2009 – May 20, 2010

Season chronology
- ← Previous; Season 1 Next → Season 3

The second season of Parks and Recreation originally aired in the United States on the NBC television network starting September 17, 2009, and ended on May 20, 2010. The season was produced by Deedle-Dee Productions and Universal Media Studios, and series co-creators Greg Daniels and Michael Schur served as executive producers. Like the first season, it focuses on Leslie Knope (Amy Poehler) and her staff on the parks and recreation department of the fictional Indiana town of Pawnee. The episodes were approximately 22 minutes long each, all of which aired at 8:30 p.m. on Thursdays. The season stars Amy Poehler, Rashida Jones, Paul Schneider, Aziz Ansari, Nick Offerman, Aubrey Plaza, and Chris Pratt.

All of the members of the original principal cast were retained and Chris Pratt, who made guest appearances throughout the previous season, joined the permanent cast in the second season. It also featured guest appearances by Louis C.K., Megan Mullally, Fred Armisen, Will Arnett, Justin Theroux and John Larroquette. The writing staff made changes based on feedback from the first season and attempted to be more topical, with episodes touching on such topics as same-sex marriage, the arrest of Henry Louis Gates, and the sex scandal of South Carolina Governor Mark Sanford.

Although the first season received generally mixed reviews, the second season was highly praised, with some reviewers declaring it one of the best comedies of the television season. Nevertheless, Parks and Recreation continued to struggle in the Nielsen ratings and averaged about 4.68 million household viewers per week, lower than Thursday night NBC shows Community, 30 Rock, and The Office. Amy Poehler was nominated for the Primetime Emmy Award for Outstanding Lead Actress in a Comedy Series, and both the series and actor Nick Offerman received nominations from the Television Critics Association Awards.

== Cast ==
=== Main ===
- Amy Poehler as Leslie Knope, the deputy director of the Pawnee parks department, who has not let politics dampen her sense of optimism; her ultimate goal is to become President of the United States. She has a strong love for her home town of Pawnee, and desires to use her position to improve it. Leslie's sense of confidence grows over the course of the season, leading her to get over her crush on Mark and begin to pursue romantic relationships.
- Rashida Jones as Ann Perkins, a nurse and Leslie's best friend. She and Leslie continue to work to get the pit next to Ann's house filled in and transformed into a park. Ann develops a romantic interest in city planner Mark, and they enter into a relationship.
- Paul Schneider as Mark Brendanawicz, a city planner with the Pawnee municipal government. He has long been disillusioned with government after being unable to achieve his career ambitions. After developing a romantic interest in Ann, Mark abandons his promiscuous lifestyle and enters into a relationship with her.
- Aziz Ansari as Tom Haverford, Leslie's self-absorbed and underachieving subordinate. While he is an employee at the parks department, he cares little about his job, and is instead more focused on his entrepreneurial ambitions. He takes great pride in his appearance and regularly pursues women despite being married. During the season it is revealed that his marriage to his wife Wendy is a green card marriage, and he and Wendy go through a divorce after she obtains her citizenship. This affects Tom greater than he anticipated, as he realizes that he actually did harbor feelings for Wendy.
- Nick Offerman as Ron Swanson, the cynical director of the parks department and Leslie's boss. Due to his incredibly negative view of government, he regularly works to make his department as inefficient as possible. This leads him to butt heads with Leslie on a number of occasions, as her philosophy regarding government is the polar opposite. Despite that, both he and Leslie have a large amount of respect for one another. Ron has been married twice; both of his ex-wives are named Tammy. He despises and fears them greatly, as they are the only two women in the world who can control him.
- Aubrey Plaza as April Ludgate, a young apathetic intern at the parks department. She cares little for her internship, and often shows annoyance at having to complete tasks. Due to her rebellious and emotionless attitude, she is often annoyed by her co-workers, especially Leslie. She has a boyfriend named Derek, who is openly gay and dating another openly gay boy named Ben. Despite being in this relationship, April begins to develop a crush on Andy, as he is one of the few people who has the ability to make her smile. She goes so far as to accept a job as Ron's assistant just so she can stay in the parks department and see Andy.
- Chris Pratt as Andy Dwyer, Ann's ex-boyfriend and lead singer of a band called "Mouse Rat". He and Ann broke up after he admitted that he had delayed the removal of the casts on his legs so that she would continue to pamper him. He now lives in a tent pitched in the pit next to Ann's house, so he can watch over her. After being injured when Leslie attempts to fill in the pit with dirt, he threatens to sue Pawnee in order to get money and impress Ann. Andy settles the lawsuit out of court however, when Leslie offers him a job as the shoe shiner in Pawnee town hall. It is here he begins to develop a romantic interest in intern April, feelings which she reciprocates.

=== Recurring ===
- Alison Becker as Shauna Malwae-Tweep, a newspaper journalist with The Pawnee Journal.
- Andrew Burlinson as Wyatt "Burly" Burlinson, the lead guitarist in Andy's band "Mouse Rat".
- Louis C.K. as Dave Sanderson, a socially awkward Pawnee police sergeant who enters into a romantic relationship with Leslie.
- Mo Collins as Joan Callamezzo, a tabloid journalist and hostess of news/talk show Pawnee Today.
- Josh Duvendeck as Ben, Derek's openly gay boyfriend.
- Andy Forrest as Kyle, a government employee who is constantly ridiculed by Andy.
- Jay Jackson as Perd Hapley, a popular Pawnee television journalist and the host of news program Ya Heard? With Perd!.
- Blake Lee as Derek, April's openly gay boyfriend who is in a relationship with Ben.
- Jim O'Heir as Jerry Gergich, an incompetent and widely ridiculed employee at the parks department.
- Retta as Donna Meagle, the no-nonsense office manager at the parks department.
- Phil Reeves as Paul Iaresco, Pawnee city manager.
- Ben Schwartz as Jean-Ralphio Saperstein, Tom's dimwitted and cocky best friend.
- Justin Theroux as Justin Anderson, a lawyer and old friend of Ann's who enters into a romantic relationship with Leslie. He is incredibly cultured and constantly tells stories of his adventures around the globe.
- Jama Williamson as Wendy Haverford, a surgeon and Tom's attractive wife. She and Tom divorce and she pursues a romantic interest in Ron.

=== Guest stars ===
- Fred Armisen as Raul, a parks official from Baraqua, Venezuela, Pawnee's sister city.
- JC Gonzalez as Jhonny, a parks intern official from Baraqua, Venezuela, Pawnee's sister city.
- Will Arnett as Chris, a strange MRI technician with whom Ann sets up Leslie on a date.
- John Balma as Barney Varmn, an incredibly boring accountant.
- H. Jon Benjamin as Scott Braddock, a high-strung Pawnee city attorney.
- Kirk Fox as Joe Fantringham aka "Sewage Joe", an employee at Pawnee's sewage department and an enemy of the Parks department.
- Michael Gross as Michael Tansley, a former director of the parks department.
- Darlene Hunt as Marcia Langman, a conservative activist with the Pawnee organization, the Society for Family Stability Foundation.
- Yvans Jourdain as Councilman Douglass Howser, head of Pawnee's city council.
- John Larroquette as Frank Beckerson, a man who had a passionate love affair with Leslie's mother Marlene in their youth.
- Rob Lowe as Chris Traeger, a state auditor who comes to Pawnee to evaluate the town's funds.
- Jim Meskimen as Martin Housely, an MC at many special events throughout Pawnee.
- Natalie Morales as Lucy, a bartender and love interest for Tom.
- Megan Mullally as Tammy Swanson (aka Tammy Two), a librarian and Ron's sex-crazed ex-wife.
- Ian Roberts as Ian Winston, a Pawnee citizen.
- Pamela Reed as Marlene Griggs-Knope, Leslie's mother and a successful politician in Pawnee.
- Andy Samberg as Carl Lorthner, a park ranger and the head of Pawnee's outdoor security.
- Paul Scheer as Keef Slertner, the energetic founder of KaBOOM!, a charitable organization.
- Detlef Schrempf as himself.
- Adam Scott as Ben Wyatt, a state auditor who comes to Pawnee to evaluate the town's funds.
- Kevin Symons as Councilman Bill Dexhart, a member of the Pawnee city council who is constantly embroiled in outrageous sex scandals.
- Cooper Thornton as Dr. Harris, Ann's boss at Pawnee's hospital.
- Gillian Vigman as Alexa Softcastle, a tabloid journalist from The Pawnee Sun.
- Susan Yeagley as Jessica Wicks, a beauty pageant winner and the wife of Nick Newport Sr., one of the richest men in Pawnee.

== Episodes ==
^{†} denotes an extended episode.

Parks and Recreation, season 2 episodes
No. overall	No. in season	Title	Directed by	Written by	Original release date	U.S. viewers (millions)
7	1	"Pawnee Zoo"	Paul Feig	Norm Hiscock	September 17, 2009	4.89
In order to promote the Pawnee Zoo, Leslie (Amy Poehler) decides to marry two of their resident penguins as a publicity stunt. However, when both penguins turn out to be male, she inadvertently causes an uproar among the townspeople.
8	2	"The Stakeout"	Seth Gordon	Rachel Axler	September 24, 2009	4.09
While taking care of the new community garden, Leslie and Tom (Aziz Ansari) are shocked to discover that someone has planted marijuana amongst the other plants. They decide to pull an all-night stakeout in order to catch the perpetrators. Meanwhile, Ann (Rashida Jones) goes on a date with Mark (Paul Schneider).
9	3	"Beauty Pageant"	Jason Woliner	Katie Dippold	October 1, 2009	4.67
Leslie will be judging the annual Miss Pawnee beauty pageant, and Tom swings a favor to become a judge as well. April also signs up for the pageant after learning the winner gets $600. Leslie asks Pawnee police officer Dave Sanderson (Louie C.K.) out on a date. Meanwhile, Ann discovers Andy (Chris Pratt) living in the pit, while Mark visits Ann to help fix her shower and to have dinner, causing a large amount of tension between Ann and Andy.
10	4	"Practice Date"	Alex Hardcastle	Harris Wittels	October 8, 2009	4.75
Her first date with Dave is approaching fast, and Leslie is very nervous. So Ann takes her out on a practice date to test out her skills. A local councilman is wrapped up in a sex scandal and Tom, Ron (Nick Offerman), Mark and April (Aubrey Plaza) decide to see who can dig up the most dirt on each other.
11	5	"Sister City"	Michael Schur	Alan Yang	October 15, 2009	4.53
Leslie plays host to the visiting party from the Parks and Recreation department of Pawnee's sister city, Boraqua, Venezuela and finds the cultural differences difficult to deal with. Tom becomes an errand boy to the visitors and April plays hard to get with Jhonny (JC Gonzalez), a Venezuelan intern. Fred Armisen guest stars as a Venezuelan delegate.
12	6	"Kaboom"	Charles McDougall	Aisha Muharrar	October 22, 2009	4.92
Leslie and the rest of the committee help a local organization named KaBOOM! build a small playground in a neighboring town. When the playground is finished in just one day, Leslie becomes frustrated with the lack of progress with the pit and goes to Mark for advice on speeding things up.
13	7	"Greg Pikitis"	Dean Holland	Michael Schur	October 29, 2009	4.80
Leslie enlists the help of Dave (guest star Louis C.K.) and Andy in order to catch a local teen vandal. Meanwhile, Ann struggles to make her Halloween party fun and gets help from an unlikely source.
14	8	"Ron and Tammy"	Troy Miller	Mike Scully	November 5, 2009	4.91
Leslie is upset when she learns the library department wants to take over her lot. Even worse, the library is run by Ron's ex-wife Tammy (guest star Megan Mullally) who still has an emotional hold on him. Meanwhile, Andy gets a job in hopes of winning Ann back.
15	9	"The Camel"	Millicent Shelton	Rachel Axler	November 12, 2009	4.58
One of the city hall murals is defaced, which plunges Leslie and the Parks Department into a fierce competition to come up with a new design. Ron and Andy share an awkward moment at Andy's new shoe-shine job.
16	10	"Hunting Trip"	Greg Daniels	Dan Goor	November 19, 2009	4.55
Trying to prove that she is capable of just hanging with the guys, Leslie tags along with Ron on his annual hunting trip, which doesn't work out exactly as she had hoped. While everyone is away, April and Andy make a connection at the office.
17	11	"Tom's Divorce"	Troy Miller	Harris Wittels	December 3, 2009	4.80
When Ron sends Leslie up to the DMV, she accidentally witnesses Tom and Wendy in divorce court. Leslie recruits the entire department to help Tom forget his worries with a night on the town and Tom comes to a realization about his marriage.
18	12	"Christmas Scandal"	Randall Einhorn	Michael Schur	December 10, 2009	4.90
While designing the Pawnee Winter Wonderland Festival, a meeting with a disgraced councilman puts Leslie in the middle of a sex scandal and forces her to hide from the press. Ron covers Leslie's job for a day and soon discovers exactly how much work Leslie does.
19	13	"The Set Up"^{†}	Troy Miller	Katie Dippold	January 14, 2010	4.63
With Dave out of the picture, Ann decides to set Leslie up with one of her co-workers, but not everything goes as planned. An old friend of Ann's reappears and makes Mark insecure about their relationship.
20	14	"Leslie's House"	Alex Hardcastle	Dan Goor	January 21, 2010	4.36
After Leslie and Justin have a series of great dates in Indianapolis, he tells her he will soon be coming back to Pawnee and Leslie decides to throw a dinner party at her house in order to impress him.
21	15	"Sweetums"	Dean Holland	Alan Yang	February 4, 2010	4.88
The Parks Department makes a deal with a local company to sell energy snacks in all of the Pawnee parks. Leslie tries to veto the deal when she later learns how unhealthy the snacks are. Mark reluctantly helps Tom move out of his house.
22	16	"Galentine's Day"	Ken Kwapis	Michael Schur	February 11, 2010	4.98
When Leslie hears the story of an old flame of her mother's, she and Justin set out to reunite the pair on Valentine's Day. Meanwhile, Andy and his band are nervous about having to perform at the Senior Center. Guest stars John Larroquette.
23	17	"Woman of the Year"	Jason Woliner	Norm Hiscock	March 4, 2010	4.61
Leslie becomes enraged when Ron wins a woman of the year award for a project that was her idea. Tom, meanwhile, tries to get the other Parks Department employees to give him one-thousand dollars so he can invest in a local Pawnee club. April helps Andy find a new apartment.
24	18	"The Possum"	Tristram Shapeero	Mike Scully	March 11, 2010	4.55
A local possum bites the mayor's dog on a golf course, and Leslie is put in charge of forming a task force to find the animal before it can do any more damage. Mark refuses to bend the rules for Ron, causing Ron to become upset.
25	19	"Park Safety"	Michael Trim	Aisha Muharrar	March 18, 2010	4.63
Jerry (Jim O'Heir) gets mugged by a group of kids, prompting Leslie to meet with the head park ranger (Andy Samberg) to improve safety in Pawnee's parks. Meanwhile, everyone in the Parks Department tries to be nicer to Jerry when he returns to work.
26	20	"Summer Catalog"	Ken Whittingham	Katie Dippold	March 25, 2010	4.47
Tasked with preparing the Summer Events Catalog, Leslie decides to take Ron and other previous directors of the Parks Department out for a picnic lunch. Tom enlists Ann and Mark's help in posing for the Catalog's cover photo.
27	21	"94 Meetings"	Tristram Shapeero	Harris Wittels	April 29, 2010	4.03
When April accidentally scheduled all of Ron's meetings for March 31 thinking that March only had 30 days, Ron has ninety-three meetings scheduled all for one day and enlists the help of everyone in the Parks department to get through them. At one of the meetings, Leslie discovers that Jessica Wicks, former Miss Pawnee and wife of Nick Newport, is planning on making alterations to a Pawnee mansion and she recruits Tom to help her stop it.
28	22	"Telethon"	Troy Miller	Amy Poehler	May 6, 2010	4.03
Leslie volunteers to co-host the Pawnee Cares Diabetes Telethon, and volunteers the rest of the Parks Department along with her. Unfortunately, Leslie has been assigned the dreaded 2 am to 6 am shift and she has to struggle to make it through the wee hours of the night. Meanwhile, Mark deliberates whether or not to ask Ann to marry him.
29	23	"The Master Plan"^{†}	Dean Holland	Michael Schur	May 13, 2010	4.28
Leslie's new park plans are put on hold by a visit from two state auditors, Chris Traeger (Rob Lowe) and Ben Wyatt (Adam Scott), causing Leslie disappointment. April anticipates advancing her relationship with Andy at her 21st birthday party held at the Snakehole Lounge, while Ann and Mark both deal with their recent break-up in different ways.
30	24	"Freddy Spaghetti"^{†}	Jason Woliner	Dan Goor	May 20, 2010	4.58
Ben and Chris have effectively shut down the government due to the Pawnee fiscal crisis, leading the closure of all the parks and the cancellation of a children's concert performed by the beloved Freddy Spaghetti. Leslie recruits the Parks Department to put on the concert anyway, leading to a confrontation with Ben. Meanwhile, Andy doesn't know how to deal with some unexpected romantic attention by Ann, which causes problems with April and Mark takes a job in the private sector and leaves the government.

== Production ==
=== Crew ===
The second season of Parks and Recreation was produced by Deedle-Dee Productions, Universal Media Studios, Fremulon and 3 Arts Entertainment. Series creators Greg Daniels and Michael Schur were executive producers along with David Miner, who previously worked on the NBC comedy series 30 Rock, and Howard Klein, who worked on The Office, another NBC comedy created by Daniels. Schur served as the showrunner of Parks and Recreation. Amy Poehler and Morgan Sackett were producers, while Daniel J. Goor was supervising producer, and Norm Hiscock and Emily Kapnek worked as consulting producers, David Hyman and Dean Holland were co-producers, and Holland also worked as an editor along with Michael Trim, who doubled as director of photography. Dorian Frankel was the casting director, Ian Phillips was the production designer, Kirston Mann was the costume designer, and Alan Yang, Harris Wittels and Katie Dippold worked as executive story editors. Tucker Cawley, who had been a consulting producer during first season of Parks and Recreation, did not return and instead created the short-lived ABC sitcom Hank, starring Kelsey Grammer.

=== Cast ===
All principal cast members from the first season returned for the second, including Amy Poehler, Rashida Jones, Aziz Ansari, Nick Offerman, Aubrey Plaza and Paul Schneider. Chris Pratt, who was billed as a guest star throughout the first season despite appearing in every episode, was promoted to the main cast in season two. Andy Dwyer, Pratt's character, was originally supposed to appear only in the first season, but the producers liked Pratt so much that almost immediately after casting him, they decided to make Andy a regular character. Schneider left the cast after the second season. Schur said when Schneider's character Mark Brendanawicz was conceived, it was anticipated he would eventually become a less frequent character who switched back and forth between government and private sector jobs. Schur claimed that both the producers and Schneider were interested in having the character return for guest appearances in future episodes, though Schneider states that he is not interested in returning and has never been contacted about it.

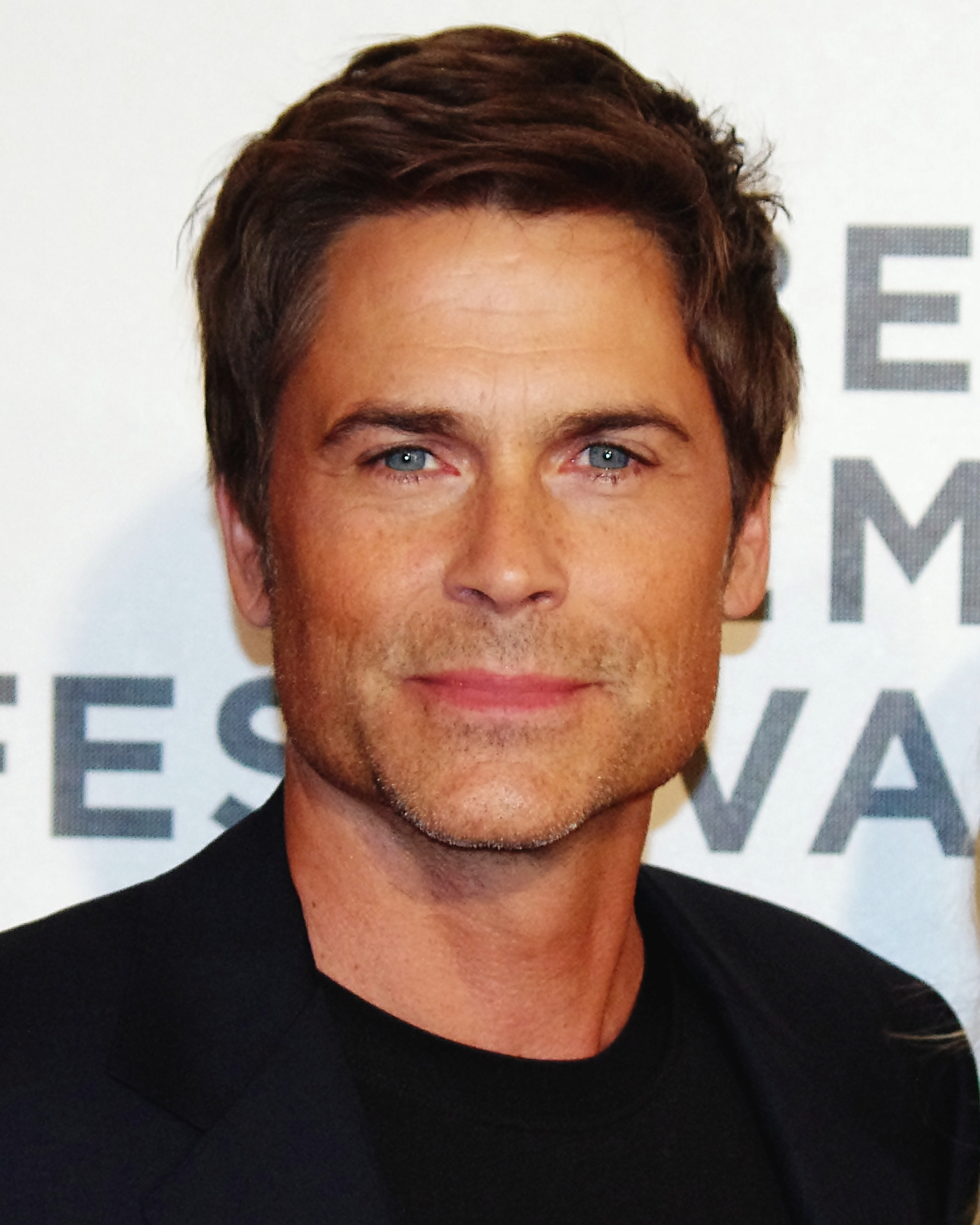
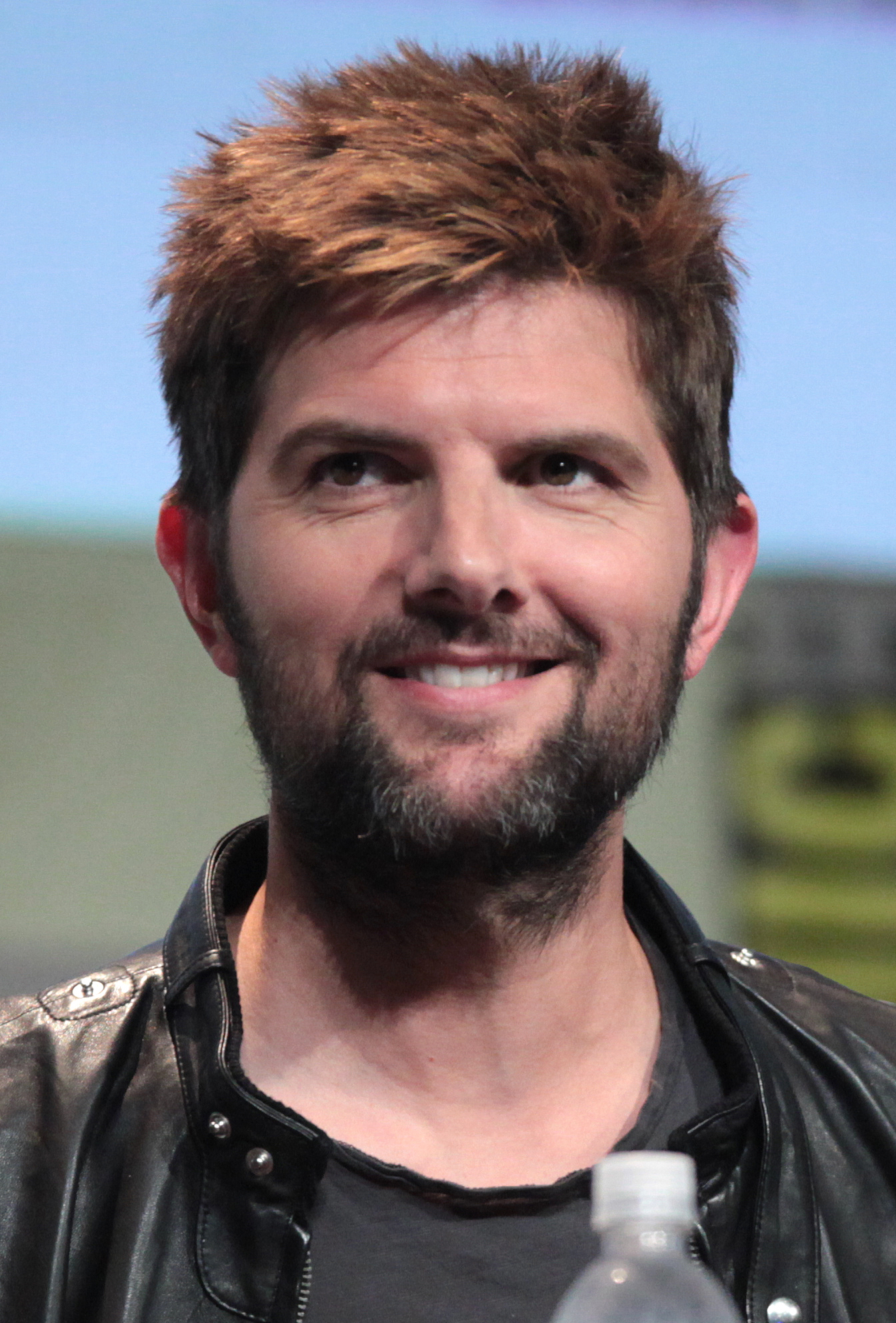
Rob Lowe (left) and Adam Scott (right) joined the cast of Parks and Recreation during the last two episodes of the second season.

Rob Lowe and Adam Scott joined the Parks and Recreation cast starting in the penultimate second-season episode, "The Master Plan". Scott left his starring role on the Starz comedy series Party Down to join Parks and Recreation, and Lowe had recently departed from the ABC drama series Brothers & Sisters. From the beginning, Scott was expected to become a regular cast member and, during the third season, eventual love interest for Leslie Knope, while Lowe was originally only intended to make a string of guest appearances in the third season and then depart the series. However, Lowe later signed a multi-year contract to become a regular cast member. Schur said even when the character Ben Wyatt was conceived, Adam Scott was considered the "dream scenario" casting choice.

Jim O'Heir and Retta, who made regular appearances as parks employees Jerry Gergich and Donna Meagle in the first season, continued to appear in season two. Although still considered guest actors, their characters started to become more fully developed and play larger roles in the episodes. Several other actors played regular supporting roles throughout the second season. Jama Williamson continued her recurring role as Wendy, Tom Haverford's ex-wife who becomes a romantic interest for Ron Swanson. Mo Collins and Jay Jackson made repeated appearances as Pawnee journalists Joan Callamezzo and Perd Hapley. Both actors were originally expected to appear only in one episode, but both returned for subsequent episodes because the writing staff enjoyed their performances. Alison Becker played another Pawnee reporter, Shauna Malwae-Tweep, a character she also played in the first season. Ben Schwartz played Jean-Ralphio, an arrogant and fast-talking playboy friend of Tom, in several episodes. Pamela Reed reprised her recurring role as Leslie's mother, Marlene, in several second-season episodes.

The second season also included several prominent guest appearances, something that distinguished Parks and Recreation from Greg Daniels' other comedy series, The Office. Schur said high-profile guests on The Office would be too distracting because most episodes are confined to one setting, while he said Parks and Recreation was "a little bit more bright and colorful than The Office". Megan Mullally, the real-life wife of Nick Offerman, appeared as Ron's ex-wife Tammy in the episode "Ron and Tammy". Schur said Mullally's appearance was well received and not overly distracting to viewers, which made the Parks and Recreation producers feel more comfortable about using future guest actors. Stand-up comedian Louis C.K. appeared in several episodes as Dave Sanderson, a Pawnee police officer and romantic interest to Leslie Knope. Although typically known for his raunchy and caustic comedy style, Louis C.K. adopted a far more deadpan sense of humor and technical tone of voice for Sanderson.

Two of Amy Poehler's previous cast members from Saturday Night Live appeared in Parks and Recreation episodes: Fred Armisen played the vice director of a Venezuelan parks department in "Sister City", and Andy Samberg portrayed the head of security for Pawnee's parks in "Park Safety". Will Arnett, then married to Amy Poehler, made a guest appearance as an MRI technician in "The Set Up". In that same episode, Justin Theroux started a string of a guest appearances as Justin Anderson, a friend of Ann and love interest for Leslie. John Larroquette appeared in "Galentine's Day" as the long-lost former love of Leslie's mother. Kevin Symons appeared in two episodes as Bill Dexhart, a Pawnee councilman prone to sexual affairs and political scandals. Paul Scheer, who appeared in the MTV sketch comedy show Human Giant with Aziz Ansari, played a charity leader in "Kaboom". In that same episode, comedian and voice actor H. Jon Benjamin played a Pawnee lawyer. Michael Gross, best known for his role as Steven Keaton from Family Ties, appeared in "Summer Catalog" as a former parks department director who loves marijuana. Detlef Schrempf, a retired basketball player who played for the Indiana Pacers, portrayed himself in "Telethon". Natalie Morales appeared in the last two episodes of the season as Lucy, a bartender who becomes Tom's girlfriend.

=== Writing and filming ===
Following season one, Parks and Recreation was originally renewed for a half season-worth of episodes, but was picked up for a full season in late October 2009. Greg Daniels said since the Parks and Recreation characters had now been established in the second season, the writers were able to write more specifically for the actors. Daniels said he believed this allowed the characters to become more balanced, rather than simply an accumulation of flaws, as they sometimes appeared in the first season. The writing staff also made an effort to be more topical with the second-season episodes. For example, the episode "Pawnee Zoo" included social commentary about same-sex marriage. Likewise, "The Stakeout" included a parody of the arrest of Henry Louis Gates, a black Harvard University professor who was arrested after police mistakenly thought he was breaking into his own home in Cambridge, Massachusetts, and a sex scandal involving a Pawnee councilman in "Practice Date" mirrored the real-life 2009 scandal of South Carolina Governor Mark Sanford, who publicly admitted to a long-term extramarital affair with an Argentinian woman.

The writers made several other changes going from season one to season two, including making the scripts more focused around the entire cast rather than just Leslie. They also tried to make Leslie appear more intelligent in the second season after receiving audience feedback that she appeared "ditzy", which Michael Schur said was never their intention. Schur said, "In the end, we just felt that Amy is an enormously likable presence on screen, so as the season went on we just tried to create situations where that would shine through." During the episode "Kaboom", a major subplot was resolved when the large construction pit that Leslie had long sought to turn into a park was filled with dirt and turned into a lot. The pit was first established in the premiere episode and had been a focal point of the series since the show began. Schur said while the pit project was originally conceived as a device to bring all the characters together working toward a common goal, and it was expected to only become a park during the series finale. However, Schur said he felt the early episodes were too focused on the pit and had led viewers to believe the entire show was about filling the pit, which was not the writers' intention, so they accelerated the resolution of that story arc. The idea of Ben and Chris, two state auditors who come in from outside Pawnee to help the town deal with budget problems, was conceived from news reports at the time of a number of states considering shutting down schools, parks and other services due to the global recession.

Poehler became pregnant during the latter half of the season, with her baby due in the summer or early fall of 2010. The Parks and Recreation producers decided not to write the pregnancy into the show, so they decided to enter into a continuous production after the season ended to bank episodes for the third season. Six season three episodes were filmed in this fashion. However, in May 2010, NBC announced the third season of Parks and Recreation was being moved to an undisclosed midseason premiere date to allow the network's new comedy, Outsourced, to run in the Thursday two-hour comedy schedule block. NBC chief executive officer Jeff Gaspin said this move was not a reflection on Parks and Recreation, and suggested the extended hiatus would not only have no effect on the show's momentum, but could actually build anticipation for its eventual return. In November 2010, it was announced Parks and Recreation would return to a 9:30 p.m. Thursday timeslot effective January 20, 2011.

== Reception ==
=== Reviews ===
There's something really special about watching a show — particularly one you've been rooting for — begin to come together, learn from its mistakes, and grow into a formidable and wholly satisfying half hour of television. I'll just say it: Parks and Recreation is the best comedy on NBC right now.

— Henning Fog,
Entertainment Weekly

The first season of Parks and Recreation received mixed to negative reviews, with many critics deeming it too similar to The Office, which shared the same mock documentary style as Parks and Recreation. In particular, several commentators said the naive and well-meaning Leslie Knope character too closely resembled The Office protagonist Michael Scott, a well-intentioned but dimwitted protagonist manager of a paper company sales office. (Note: Los Angeles Times Denise Martin wrote of the first season, "Many critics said the show was needlessly similar to The Office – both in its mock documentary format and naive lead." Alan Sepinwall of The Star-Ledger wrote, "Leslie's complete lack of self-awareness, coupled with the mockumentary format that "Parks and Recreation" creators Greg Daniels and Mike Schur have borrowed from "The Office," make comparisons between the two shows inevitable." New York Post writer Linda Stasi said Parks and Recreation had "the same sitcom set-up, the same self-congratulatory, hipster style and an identical lead character" as The Office during the first season. Verne Gay of Newsday wrote, "By osmosis or direction, Poehler's Knope has absorbed the mannerisms of Steve Carell's Michael Scott, while Pawnee's P&R department feels an awful lot like Scranton's Dunder Mifflin. Unfortunately, one show's a classic, the other a near knockoff." The A.V. Club writer Scott Tobias called the show a "'not-an-Office-spin-off' Office spin-off" and said "Leslie Knope is conceived too much like the Michael Scott of petty, inept small-time government".) However, most critics declared the second season a vast improvement over the first, (Note: Denise Martin of Los Angeles Times wrote, "Parks, in its second season, has emerged as a critical darling that can stand on its own." Entertainment Weekly writer Michael Ausiello wrote, "When it debuted last spring, Amy Poehler's workplace comedy was a snooze and a half. But apparently, while I was sleeping it got better. Lots better." Heather Havrilesky of Salon.com said, "After a slow start in its first season, this show is firing on all pistons, transforming a source of kooky, mild amusement to the kind of smart, incisive parody that's utterly addictive." Time magazine writer James Poniewozik wrote, "Comeback story or just coming into its own? Amy Poehler's sitcom is getting a lot of praise in its second season, and rightfully: it's very very good and very very funny." E! Online writer Kristin Dos Santos wrote of the second season, "The storylines are solid, the one-liners hilarious, and the characters much more developed than in season one.") with some even claiming it had surpassed The Office and 30 Rock as the best comedy of NBC's Thursday line-up. It was declared the best comedy of the television season by Entertainment Weekly writer Henning Fog and The Star-Ledger television columnist Alan Sepinwall. Entertainment Weekly writer Michael Ausiello, who was critical of the first season, called it the "most improved" show of the season. Time magazine writer James Poniewozik included Parks and Recreation in his list of the 10 best television shows of 2009, and IGN declared it the best comedy series of 2009. Several reviewers called the second season one of the most impressive comebacks in television history.

Amy Poehler said the first season struggled in part due to extremely high expectations from comparisons to The Office. Parks and Recreation staff also felt part of the reason for the improvement was that the characters have become better developed, and viewers have come to like and care more about them. Likewise, Michael Schur believed much of the early criticism stemmed from the fact that audiences were not yet familiar with the characters, and he believed viewers liked the second season better because they had gotten to know the characters better as the series progressed. Commentators said the supporting cast was now working with better material and that Poehler's character had improved and become less over-the-top and more human than in the first season, (Note: Alan Sepinwall of The Star-Ledger said Leslie Knope was now "more recognizably human than she was at the start" and "a little more self-aware, not always dialed up to 11". Heather Havrilesky of Salon.com wrote, "Instead of turning every character into a joke-spewing lunatic, the writers have started to focus on the aspects of each character that feel organic and interesting [and] we understand Leslie as a fleshed-out character, not just a gigantic buffoon who's funny but tough to care about." Time magazine writer James Poniewozik said of the show, "Now that it's found its rhythm (and reined in Poehler's character, Leslie Knope), it's become an closely observed comedy of small-town government and people." Zap2it writer Rick Porter wrote, "Lots and lots of stories have been written about how much "Parks and Recreation" improved from its first to its second season, and about how lead character Leslie Knope had become smarter and less naive." Entertainment Weekly writer Michael Ausiello said the season improved in part because "Poehler has dialed down her performance as deputy parks director Leslie Knope.") and more distinct from Michael Scott. Several reviewers praised the decision to drop season one subplots that risked becoming stale, like whether Andy and Ann would keep dating, and Leslie's long-standing crush on Mark. Others complimented the decision to fill in the pit during the second season, which they said freed the show up for more stories and better scripts. Despite the vast change in critical reception, Parks and Recreation staff said they felt only a few minor changes were made to the show itself. Michael Schur said, "I don't think magical fairy dust was sprinkled over the show. I just think we're getting better at it." NBC officials compared the late rush of critical acclaim for Parks and Recreation to that of The Office, which received mixed reviews during its first season before most critics agreed it found its rhythm in the second season.

Nick Offerman received considerable praise for his performance as Ron Swanson during the second season. Many reviewers praised Offerman's subtle and understated style of comedy, and said he was often the funniest part of the scenes he was in. (Note: New York Times writer Jeremy Egner wrote that Ron Swanson had attained a "mythic status" and "has become something of a cult figure". Steve Heisler of GQ magazine wrote that Nick Offerman's role as Ron Swanson was a major part of the show's "creative resurgence". The Star-Ledger writer Alan Sepinwall said, "The Parks and Rec writers have combined to turn Ron F'ing Swanson into a man who can say completely demented things with absolute certainty, as if they were the most natural thing in the world." Kat Angust of Dose magazine said, "Thank God for Nick Offerman, who plays Ron F**cking Swanson so perfectly deadpan that you actually believe in the ridiculous things he says, which makes it that much funnier.") Jonah Weiner of Slate magazine declared Swanson "Parks and Recreation's secret weapon" and "vital to the show's improvement". Aziz Ansari, who was particularly acclaimed during the first season for his role as Tom Haverford, received similar praise in the second season as well. Many reviewers were critical of the pairing of Mark and Ann, feeling the couple lacked chemistry and were often the least funny parts of the individual episodes. Entertainment Weekly writer Margaret Lyons called Mark and Ann the show's "Achilles' heel", and Sandra Gonzalez, also from Entertainment Weekly, wrote, "No matter what they do with these two, I can’t help but be bored."

=== Ratings ===
Despite the critical success, the second season of Parks and Recreation continued to suffer in the Nielsen ratings. By December 2009, the average episode viewership was 5.3 million households. The average was lower than the other NBC comedy shows that aired Thursday night along with Parks and Recreation: Community drew an average 6.5 million households, 30 Rock an average 7.3 million, and The Office an average 10.1 million. By February 2010, ratings had begun to improve all of NBC's Thursday comedy shows, especially Parks and Recreation, but the network remained in fourth place among the major networks in Nielsen ratings. By the end of the season, the average viewership for the 24 episodes of season two was 4.60 million, lower than season one's average of 5.38 million households.

=== Awards ===
Amy Poehler was nominated for a Primetime Emmy Award for Outstanding Lead Actress in a Comedy Series. The episode "Telethon", in which Leslie frantically stays awake for 36 hours to volunteer for a charity telethon, was her performance submitted for Primetime Emmy Award consideration. This marked Poehler's third Primetime Emmy nomination, having previously received twice for Outstanding Supporting Actress in a Comedy Series during her time on Saturday Night Live. Poehler ultimately lost to Edie Falco for her performance on the Showtime comedy series Nurse Jackie. Also that year, the Parks and Recreation theme song by Gaby Moreno and Vincent Jones was for the Emmy Award for Outstanding Main Title Theme Music, but the award again went to Nurse Jackie.

Parks and Recreation was also nominated for a Television Critics Association Award for Outstanding Achievement in Comedy, and Nick Offerman received a nomination for Individual Achievement in Comedy; the awards ultimately were awarded, respectively, to the comedy series Modern Family and to Jane Lynch for her performance in the musical comedy-drama Glee. The second-season premiere episode, "Pawnee Zoo", won the GLAAD Media Award for Outstanding Individual Episode. It was nominated alongside the ABC drama series Private Practice, the NBC supernatural drama The Listener and the CW drama/horror series Supernatural in the category. Aubrey Plaza received a Best Supporting Actress in Television nomination from the Imagen Awards, which honors positive portrayals of Latinos in entertainment, but the award went to Maria Canals-Barrera for her role in Wizards of Waverly Place: The Movie (2009). Also in 2010, Parks and Recreation received two nominations from Entertainment Weekly's Ewwy Awards: one for Best Comedy Series, and one for Nick Offerman as Best Supporting Actor in a Comedy.
