= Park Safety =

- Parks and Recreation episode
- Episode no.: Season 2 Episode 19
- Directed by: Michael Trim
- Written by: Aisha Muharrar
- Original air date: March 18, 2010

Guest appearances
- Mo Collins as Joan Callamezzo; Courtney Lamb as Reporter #2; Braden Lynch as Reporter #1; Jim O'Heir as Jerry Gergich; Phil Reeves as Paul Iaresco; Retta as Donna Meagle; Andy Samberg as Carl Lorthner

Episode chronology
← Previous "The Possum"	Next → "Summer Catalog"
- Parks and Recreation season 2

"Park Safety" is the 19th episode of the second season of the American comedy television series Parks and Recreation, and the 25th overall episode of the series. It originally aired on NBC in the United States on March 18, 2010. In the episode, Jerry is apparently mugged, which forces his co-workers to be nicer to him, and prompts Leslie to seek stronger safety measures for the city's parks.

The episode was written by Aisha Muharrar and directed by Michael Trim. The writers sought to establish in "Park Safety" that the other characters liked Jerry, even though they often make jokes at his expense. It featured a guest appearance by comedian Andy Samberg, who previously worked with Parks star Amy Poehler on the sketch comedy series Saturday Night Live, as a parks ranger named Carl. It also featured Mo Collins in her recurring guest role as Joan Callamezzo, host of the morning news program Pawnee Today.

According to Nielsen Media Research, "Park Safety" was seen by 4.7 million household viewers. Among audiences between ages 18 and 49, it experienced a slightly lower rating than the previous week's episode, "The Possum", in part due to competition from the 2010 NCAA Men's Division I Basketball Tournament. "Park Safety" received generally positive reviews, with several reviewers praising the comedic scene in which Jerry gives an embarrassing presentation to his co-workers. Samberg's performance, however, received mostly negative reviews.

== Plot ==
Leslie holds a drawing to determine who will fill the park's hummingbird feeders, a job reviled by the parks and recreation department. Jerry, who is often mocked by his co-workers, is chosen because everybody writes down Jerry's name instead of their own. Later, Leslie receives a call from Ann that Jerry is in the hospital with a dislocated shoulder. Jerry claims to have been mugged in the park, and Leslie decides nobody should tease Jerry anymore. When Jerry returns, he acts particularly buffoonish during a slideshow presentation, and ends up farting and splitting his pants, but everyone holds back laughter at Leslie's request. Leslie meets with Carl Lorthner, a park security ranger who is incredibly loud but oblivious to the fact. Leslie suggests Carl get more help for the park to be safe. Meanwhile, Ron teaches a self-defense course to the rest of the department so they don't end up like Jerry.

Leslie, Tom, and Jerry join Carl to take a tour of the park where Jerry was mugged. Carl says the area is largely unprotected due to budget cuts, so Leslie vows to get more funding. She appears on Pawnee Today, the local news show, saying the Pawnee government failed the parks and that security is poor. Paul, the city manager, is angry over the television appearance, but informs Leslie the stunt worked and the mayor is offering $2,500 to help fix the park. While at a press conference about the money, Jerry confesses to Leslie that he wasn't mugged: he dropped a breakfast burrito in a creek, then fell while trying to grab it and dislocated his shoulder. He fabricated the mugger story because he was embarrassed and didn't want everyone to make fun of him. Leslie angrily relates Jerry's story to Mark, but he stops her short when he says that Jerry was too scared of his co-workers to be honest with them. Leslie soon discovers Carl was offended by Leslie's statements about park security and plans to show footage of Jerry falling into the creek on Pawnee Today. Leslie negotiates with Carl to not show the event, and instead they talk during the show about how much they enjoyed the film Avatar, much to the anger of host Joan Callamezzo. As part of their deal to not show the tape, Leslie buys Carl a brand new security cart. Carl hands over the tape, which she agrees to throw away after she watches it one last time. The office goes back to mocking Jerry, but with less venom than before, while Jerry confides that he doesn't really care because he's just two years away from retiring on a full pension and enjoying a peaceful retirement.

In a side plot, a love triangle develops between Andy, April and Ann. In an interview, Ann says Andy is a fun person but was a terrible boyfriend because he is completely reliant on others. When learning self-defense from Ron, Ann takes down Andy with a wrist grab, impressing Andy but making April jealous. After Andy is accidentally knocked out by Ron, Ann later approaches Andy at his shoe shine stand and brings him gifts to help him feel better. April arrives and Andy gives her a vegetarian muffin. Surprised Andy got something for someone other than himself, Ann believes Andy has changed.

== Production ==
"Park Safety" was written by Aisha Muharrar and directed by Michael Trim. It featured a guest appearance by comedian Andy Samberg as Carl, the park ranger. Samberg and Parks and Recreation star Amy Poehler previously appeared together as regular cast members in the NBC sketch comedy series, Saturday Night Live. The role of Carl was written with Samberg in mind because the writing staff knew they could get him as a guest appearance as long as filming corresponded with his Saturday Night Live schedule, although the character was tweaked slightly when it was confirmed Samberg would definitely play him. Samberg also knew most of the supporting cast, writers and staff when the episode was filmed. During an interview about his performance in the episode, Samberg jokingly responded:

"Well, I don't want to jinx it, but I'm pretty sure it's the best episode, and maybe not just of this show but of any show on television ever, any theater show, any staged show, movie, or any, like, campfire ritual performed by cavemen. Take it all the way back. I think this is going to be the thing everyone talks about for the rest of their lives, and it will live on in infamy and history. If aliens came down and wanted one artifact to learn about human life, I think it would be this episode of Parks and Recreation. And you can take that to the bank."

The idea of a Jerry-centered episode arose when the writers decided one of the characters would get mugged. Muharrar said, "Once we thought about it, it was obvious it had to be Jerry. He's the Parks Department punching bag, and it seemed like it was time for Jerry's revenge." Muharrar said the script tried to convey that although his co-workers mock him, they do not hate him, and that Jerry does not take the jokes against him personally. Series co-creator Michael Schur said once it was established in the episode "Practice Date" that Jerry was the co-worker everyone else picked on, he felt it was important to write an episode that established the other characters actually liked Jerry, despite their jokes at his expense.

For the scenes involving self-defense courses, the supporting cast underwent stunt training with the help of stunt coordinator Sean Graham. Ron wears a back support belt during the course, which was actor Nick Offerman's idea. Offerman has many fight choreography skills from his past work in the Chicago theater, and he combined those skills with his training in Kabuki dance and theater. Offerman said, "I threw in a couple of Kabuki moves that we all had a hard time keeping a straight face through." It was a reference to the episode "The Stakeout", in which Ron suffered a hernia, and Muharrar said, "The idea [is] that Ron has the belt in his car trunk and is ready to go at a moment's notice."

"Park Safety" also featured Mo Collins as Pawnee Today host Joan Callamezzo, who previously appeared in the episodes "Pawnee Zoo" and "Christmas Scandal". Poehler was pregnant when "Park Safety" was filmed, and some commentators said it was visibly clear in certain scenes. A newspaper clipping with a story and photo of Andy is taped to the wall of his shoeshine stand. This is a reference to the Pawnee Journal article written about him in the previous episode, "The Possum". A stand selling Sweetums nutrition bars is visible during one of the park scenes. This is a reference to the previous episode "Sweetums", where the company lobbies to sell its unhealthy snacks at the parks. A downloadable version of the "Safe Parks Now!" poster Leslie made in the episode, which featured a photo of Jerry with a black eye, was also featured on the website.

== Cultural references ==
When Leslie and Carl agree not to discuss Jerry on Pawnee Today, they instead discuss the quality of the film Avatar, the 2009 James Cameron epic science fiction film released a few months before the episode first aired. Ann explains her proficiency during Ron's self-defense training courses results from her strong interest in female-centric original movies on the women's television network Lifetime. While describing how Tom would react to the news that Jerry dislocated his shoulder reaching for a breakfast burrito, Leslie said, "What would you do for a Klondike bar? Kill your wife?" This is a reference to the commercial jingle for the ice cream snack: "What would you do for a Klondike bar?"

== Reception ==
In its original American broadcast on March 18, 2010, "Park Safety" was seen by 4.7 million household viewers, according to Nielsen Media Research. Although an increase in viewership over the 4.6 million household viewers of the previous episode, "The Possum", "Park Safety" marked a five percent drop in the Nielsen rating itself. It drew a 2.0 rating/6 share among viewers between ages 18 and 49, compared to 2.1 rating/6 share the previous week. "Park Safety" suffered from competition from CBS footage of the first round of the 2010 NCAA Men's Division I Basketball Tournament, which drew 10.32 million household viewers during the 8:30 p.m. timeshot it shared with Parks and Recreation. "Park Safety" also drew less viewers (although a higher Nielsen rating) than the ABC drama series FlashForward, which drew 6.3 million households, and a repeat of the Fox crime drama Bones, which drew 6.6 million household viewers. Parks and Recreation outperformed a repeat of the CW supernatural–fantasy horror series The Vampire Diaries, which drew 1.49 million household viewers.

Jerry's biggest moment of shame in an episode full of them was not only an explosively funny moment, but a reminder of how well Parks and Rec has built up its world and characters. Just as The Office season two began giving personalities to Stanley, Angela and Creed, this show has turned Jerry and Donna from glorified extras into characters who occupy their own specific space in the fabric of the show's humor.

— Alan Sepinwall,
The Star-Ledger

"Park Safety" received generally positive reviews, with several reviewers particularly praising the scene in which Jerry gives an embarrassing presentation to his co-workers. Andy Samberg's performance, however, received mostly negative reviews. Entertainment Weekly writer Sandra Gonzalez called "Park Safety" a great episode, and complimented the scenes involving Jerry and the growing romance between Andy and April. Gonzalez said the only negative aspect was Samberg, of whom she said, "the scream-talking gag got old fast". Alan Sepinwall, television columnist with The Star-Ledger, also enjoyed the scene with Jerry's presentation, and praised the show for fleshing out its minor characters, comparing it to The Office and its similar treatment of supporting characters during its second season. Sepinwall said Samberg's character was "a little too broad for the show's buttoned-down style" but led to some funny moments.

Steve Heisler of The A.V. Club called Jerry's presentation "one of the most amazing scenes in Parks & Rec history". Heisler also praised Pratt's performance and felt Ann was unusually sympathetic in "Park Safety", but felt Samberg was poorly used and his loud talking quickly grew tiresome. New York magazine writer Steve Kandell said "Park Safety" continued an ongoing development of the mythology of the Pawnee community, comparing it to "a live-action Springfield", the setting of the animated comedy series The Simpsons. Kandell said Samberg's character "could have been irritating but somehow wasn't". Matt Fowler of IGN called Jerry's presentation "one of the best, most pointed moments of crude humor that we've ever seen on the show". Fowler also said Swanson's expertise in self-defense "fits perfectly" to his character. Kona Gallagher of TV Squad said the constant mocking of Jerry made him feel uncomfortable, and that Samberg "just seemed like the personification of an SNL skit instead of a real character". But Gallagher praised Ron Swanson's role in the episode, as well as the apparent rekindling of Ann's feelings for Andy.

== DVD release ==
"Park Safety", along with the other 23 second-season episodes of Parks and Recreation, was released on a four-disc DVD set in the United States on November 30, 2010. The DVD included deleted scenes for each episode.
