= Sweetums (Parks and Recreation) =

- Parks and Recreation episode
- Episode no.: Season 2 Episode 15
- Directed by: Dean Holland
- Written by: Alan Yang
- Original air date: February 4, 2010

Guest appearances
- Josh Duvendeck as Ben; Harley Graham as Dakota Newport; Ryan Hartwig as Denver Newport; Blake Lee as Derek; Don McManus as Randall; Christopher Murray as Nick Newport Sr.; Jim O'Heir as Jerry Gergich; Phil Reeves as Paul Iaresco; Retta as Donna Meagle; Justin Theroux as Justin Anderson; Gary Weeks as Nick Newport Jr.; Jama Williamson as Wendy Haverford

Episode chronology
← Previous "Leslie's House"	Next → "Galentine's Day"
- Parks and Recreation season 2

"Sweetums" is the 15th episode of the second season of the American comedy television series Parks and Recreation, and the 21st overall episode of the series. It originally aired on NBC in the United States on February 4, 2010. In the episode, the Parks and Recreation Department hosts a public forum to discuss a sponsorship agreement with local candy manufacturer, Sweetums. Leslie and Ann warn the public of the dangers of supposedly nutritious snack bars called "Nutriyums", which are filled with simple sugars, notably high fructose corn syrup.

The episode was written by Alan Yang and directed by Dean Holland. "Sweetums" addressed several issues including the politics of corporate sponsorship, the use of propaganda and free gifts to manipulate public opinion, and the dangers of corn syrup-related products, which are regularly available in vending machines at public places, such as schools, parks or municipal buildings.

The episode featured a guest performance by Justin Theroux as Leslie's boyfriend, Justin Anderson. According to Nielsen Media Research, "Sweetums" was seen by 4.87 million households, and drew the season's highest rating among viewers aged between 18 and 49. The episode received positive reviews from critics.

== Plot ==
The Pawnee Parks and Recreation Department considers a potential sponsorship deal with Sweetums, a local candy manufacturer hoping to market supposedly nutritious snack bars to park visitors. Ron Swanson supports the deal as he advocates governmental privatization and emphasizes consumer choice over public safety. Leslie Knope initially supports the deal as well, until Ann Perkins informs her they are filled with unhealthy corn syrup. At a public forum convened to discuss the deal, Sweetums representatives screen propaganda films, highlighting consumer satisfaction, while Leslie responds by screening a 30-year-old Sweetums film which discusses how corn syrup and other snack bar ingredients make cattle unhealthy. At the end of Leslie's screening, Sweetums brings in its commercial's primary actor, the company's CEO Nick Newport Jr. and his son and daughter, Denver and Dakota. They bribe the audience with free candy, after which the forum votes in favor of the sponsorship deal.

Meanwhile, Tom Haverford attempts to move out of his home after his divorce from Wendy. Tom hesitates to reveal his feelings for his ex-wife, whom he married to protect from deportation. Donna Meagle, April Ludgate, Jerry Gergich and Andy Dwyer join to help Tom move his many boxes to his new home, while Tom himself works very little. At the end of the episode, Tom learns that his new home has a gas leak and that he is unable to move in until Monday. He asks the department members to take the boxes into their own homes, but they ultimately bring his possessions and leave them in the Parks and Recreation Department office. Throughout the move, April continues to develop romantic feelings for Andy, who remains oblivious to her affections. When April's boyfriend Derek and his gay boyfriend Ben arrive at Wendy's house, they mock Andy, which prompts April to refer to their behavior as "really gay for a gay couple."

== Production ==
"Sweetums" was written by Alan Yang and directed by Dean Holland. The episode addresses the supposed dangers of corn syrup-related products, which are regularly available in vending machines at public places, such as schools, parks or municipal buildings. The issue has been the subject of several town meetings like those featured in the episode, and companies use propaganda videos similar to that used by Sweetums in the episode. "Sweetums" featured one of a string of slated guest appearances by Justin Theroux as Justin Anderson, a love interest for Leslie, although Theroux only appeared in the cold open scene of "Sweetums". In one scene, Ron builds a wooden harp to prove to Leslie what he is capable of doing while drinking alcohol. This element of Ron's character was inspired by actor Nick Offerman, who in addition to comedy runs an independent carpentry business called Offerman Woodshop. Michael Schur, co-creator of Parks and Recreation, said he planned to incorporate it into Ron's character soon after learning about Offerman's carpentry skills. A Sweetums stand is visible during a scene in the future Parks and Recreation episode "Park Safety", a reference to the outcome of the "Sweetums" episode.

== Reception ==
In its original American NBC broadcast on February 4, 2010, "Sweetums" was seen by 4.87 million households, according to Nielsen Media Research. It marked a 15 percent increase over the previous week's episode, "Leslie's House". "Sweetums" drew a 2.3 rating/6 share among viewers between 18 and 49, which was the highest rating of its kind for a second season episode at the time, although the season premiere episode "Pawnee Zoo" drew a slightly larger viewership of about 5 million households. During its original broadcast, "Sweetums" ranked third in its 8:30 p.m., behind Bones on Fox, which drew 12.64 million household viewers, and Survivor on CBS, which drew 8.39 million households.

The episode had nuggets of heart, lots of laughs, and outstanding ensemble comedy acting; it’s the winning formula that has been working very well for Parks. Much of the show’s greatness lies in the actions and expressions of the cast.

— Sandra Gonzalez
Entertainment Weekly

"Sweetums" received generally positive reviews. Matt Fowler of IGN called it a "fantastic episode", and called the world of Parks and Recreation rich, lively and "a beautiful mosaic". Fowler praised individual comedic moments, like the DJ Roomba jokes and portrayal of the easily fooled Pawnee citizens, as well as the development of storylines like that of Tom and Wendy, and Andy and April. Steve Heisler of The A.V. Club praised the episode for revealing more about the mythology of the town of Pawnee, such as the strong influence Sweetums holds over the residents, and the ongoing feud between the parks department and the library. He also praised the character development of characters like Tom and April, adding, "It's amazing to me how in such a short time, Parks & Rec has taken the most one-note characters and made them truly three-dimensional."

The Star-Ledger television columnist Alan Sepinwall declared "Sweetums" one of the episodes he would suggest to newcomers seeking to become familiar with Parks and Recreation. Sepinwall enjoyed the main story with Leslie and Ron, which he said "returned to a goldmine for the series: the civil servants having to deal with the insane questions and complaints from their constituents". He also felt Tom's subplot was impressive because it made the character sympathetic despite him being so inconsiderate to his friends. Sandra Gonzalez of Entertainment Weekly particularly praised Aziz Ansari and Ron Swanson, as well as the moving subplot, which she said spotlighted the show's impressive supporting cast. Gonzalez felt the main plot "fell a little flat", but was helped by the conflict between Leslie and Ron. Steve Kandell of New York magazine praised the episode, and said the script keeps the characters grounded without making them into caricatures.

== DVD release ==
"Sweetums", along with the other 23 second-season episodes of Parks and Recreation, was released on a four-disc DVD set in the United States on November 30, 2010. The DVD included deleted scenes for each episode.
