= Mike Scully =

American writer and producer (born 1956)

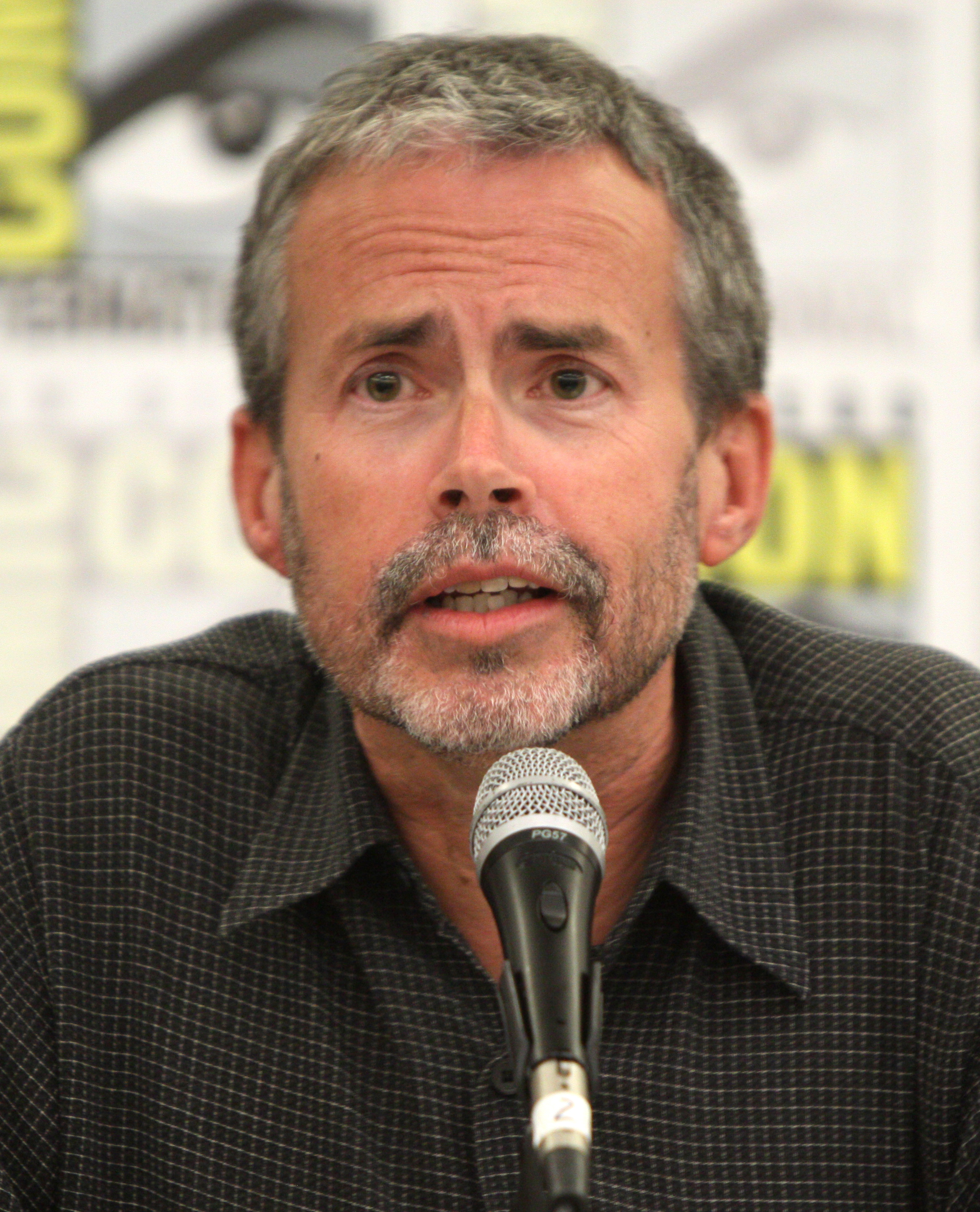
- Scully in 2011
- Born: Michael C. Scully; October 2, 1956 (age 70); Springfield, Massachusetts, U.S.
- Occupation: Television writer
- Years active: 1986–present
- Spouse: Julie Thacker
- Children: 5

Michael C. Scully (born October 2, 1956) is an American television writer and producer. He is known for his work as executive producer and showrunner of the animated sitcom The Simpsons from 1997 to 2001. Scully grew up in West Springfield, Massachusetts, and long had an interest in writing. He was an underachiever at school and dropped out of college, going on to work in a series of jobs. Eventually, in 1986, he moved to Los Angeles where he worked as a stand-up comic and wrote for Yakov Smirnoff.

Scully went on to write for several television sitcoms before 1993, when he was hired to write for The Simpsons. There, he wrote 12 episodes, including "Lisa on Ice" and "Team Homer", and served as showrunner from seasons 9 to 12. Scully won three Primetime Emmy Awards for his work on the series, with many publications praising his episodes, but others criticizing his tenure as a period of decline in the show's quality. Scully also co-wrote and co-produced 2007's The Simpsons Movie.

More recently, Scully co-created The Pitts, The Boy Who Lost His Schoolbag, and Complete Savages, as well as working on Everybody Loves Raymond and Parks and Recreation. He co-developed the short-lived animated television version of Napoleon Dynamite, and co-created Duncanville with his wife, Julie Thacker, and comedian Amy Poehler.

== Early life ==
Scully was born October 2, 1956, at Springfield Hospital in Springfield, Massachusetts, and grew up in the Merrick section of West Springfield. His father, Richard, was a salesman and owned a dry-cleaning business; his mother Geraldine (d. 1985) worked for the Baystate Medical Center once Scully and his brothers were old enough to be left at home alone. Scully is of Irish ancestry.

As a child, Scully "hoped to be a musician or a hockey player." At Main Street Elementary School, with the encouragement of his teacher, James Doyle, he developed an interest in writing, serving as editor for his school newspaper. He graduated from West Springfield High School in 1974, having been voted "Most Likely Not to Live Up to Potential" by his classmates, and dropped out of Holyoke Community College after one day, undecided about what he wanted to do with his life. He took up work in the clothing department at Steiger's department store, as a janitor at the Baystate Medical Center and also as a driving instructor. He commented: "I think if I had actually succeeded at college and gotten a degree in accounting or something, I might have given up too quickly on writing. Having no marketable job skills was a tremendous incentive to keep trying to succeed as a writer." He realized "there probably wasn't going to be a career in riding around with my friends listening to Foghat," so Scully decided he "definitely wanted to break into comedy" even though he "really had no reason to believe [he] could succeed." Regardless, he moved to Los Angeles, California, in 1982.

== Career ==
=== Early career ===
In California, Scully worked in a tuxedo store. He also got a job writing jokes for comedian Yakov Smirnoff and developed his joke-writing skills by performing himself at amateur stand-up comedy nights. He purchased scripts from a variety of half-hour comedy shows, including Taxi, to train himself to write them and had numerous speculative scripts rejected. He started "bouncing around Hollywood working on some of the lousiest sitcoms in history." He served on the writing staff of The Royal Family, Out of This World, Top of the Heap, and What a Country!, where he did audience warm-up, a role he also performed on Grand.

=== The Simpsons ===
"There's one web site where they're always calling for me to be fired, where they really hate me. They find targets and they'll go after you. I think their expectations are unrealistic. People want everything to stay the same. I think it's easier for people to go in and just criticize and say what they hate about something, rather than find out what they like."

— Scully in 2001 on criticism of his stint as The Simpsons' showrunner

In 1993, David Mirkin hired Scully to write for The Simpsons, as a replacement for the departing Conan O'Brien, after reading some of his sample scripts. He began as a writer and producer for the show during its fifth season and wrote the episodes "Lisa's Rival", "Two Dozen and One Greyhounds", and "Lisa on Ice", which aired in season six. "Lisa's Rival" was his first episode; he wrote the script, but the original concept had been conceived by O'Brien. Similarly, he wrote the script for "Two Dozen and One Greyhounds", which was based on an idea by Al Jean and Mike Reiss. "Lisa on Ice" was inspired by Scully's love of ice hockey and featured many experiences from his childhood, as was "Marge Be Not Proud" (which he wrote for season seven), which was based "one of the most traumatic moments" of his life, when he was caught shoplifting at age 12. He jokingly told Variety, "It's great to be paid for reliving the horrors of your life." He also wrote "Team Homer" and "Lisa's Date with Density". Scully noted: "I wrote a lot of Lisa's shows. I have five daughters, so I like Lisa a lot. I like Homer, too. Homer comes very naturally to me; I don't know if that's a good or a bad thing. A lot of my favorite episodes are the ones when Homer and Lisa are in conflict with each other ... They're very human, I think that's their appeal."

Scully became showrunner of The Simpsons in 1997, during its ninth season. As showrunner and executive producer, Scully said his aim was to "not wreck the show", and he headed up the writing staff and oversaw all aspects of the show's production. During his time as showrunner, he was credited with writing or co-writing five episodes: "Treehouse of Horror VIII" ("The HΩmega Man" segment), "Sunday, Cruddy Sunday", "Beyond Blunderdome", "Behind the Laughter" and "The Parent Rap". Scully was popular with the staff members, many of whom praised his organization and management skills. Writer Tom Martin said he was "quite possibly the best boss I've ever worked for" and "a great manager of people," while Don Payne commented that for Scully "it was really important that we kept decent hours". Scully served as showrunner until 2001, during season 12, making him the first person to run the show for more than two seasons. He returned in season 14 to write and executive produce the episode "How I Spent My Strummer Vacation", and co-wrote and co-produced The Simpsons Movie in 2007.

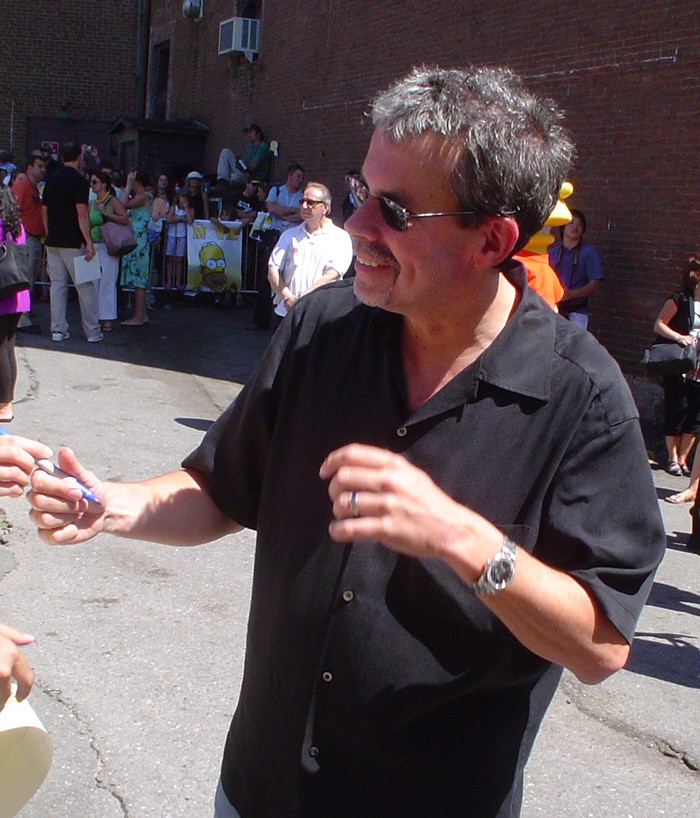
Scully in July 2007, at the premiere of The Simpsons Movie in Springfield, Vermont

Scully's tenure as showrunner of The Simpsons has been the subject of criticism from some of the show's fans. John Ortved wrote, "Scully's episodes excel when compared to what The Simpsons airs nowadays, but he was the man at the helm when the ship turned towards the iceberg." The BBC noted "the common consensus is that The Simpsons' golden era ended after season nine", while an op-ed in Slate by Chris Suellentrop argued The Simpsons changed from a realistic show about family life into a typical cartoon during Scully's years: "Under Scully's tenure, The Simpsons became, well, a cartoon. ... Episodes that once would have ended with Homer and Marge bicycling into the sunset (perhaps while Bart gagged in the background) now end with Homer blowing a tranquilizer dart into Marge's neck." The Simpsons under Scully has been negatively labelled as a "gag-heavy, Homer-centric incarnation" by Jon Bonné of MSNBC, while some fans have bemoaned the transformation in Homer's character during the era, from dumb yet well-meaning to "a boorish, self-aggrandizing oaf", dubbing him "Jerkass Homer".

Some of Scully's work on the show also received critical praise. Scully won five Primetime Emmy Awards for his work on The Simpsons, while Entertainment Weekly cited "How I Spent My Strummer Vacation" as the show's 22nd best episode. Robert Canning of IGN also gave the episode a positive review, something he also did for "Behind the Laughter" and "Trilogy of Error", which aired during season 12. He called the latter "one extremely enjoyable misadventure. The Simpsons may have peaked in the '90s, but that doesn't mean the eight years since haven't delivered their share of quality episodes. This was one of them." Tom Martin said that he does not understand the criticism against Scully, and that he thinks the criticism "bothered [him], and still bothers him, but he managed to not get worked up over it." Ortved noted in his book that blaming a single show runner for what some perceive as the lowering quality of the show "is unfair." When asked in 2007 how the series' longevity is sustained, Scully joked, "Lower your quality standards. Once you've done that you can go on forever."

=== Further career ===
Scully was a writer and co-executive producer on Everybody Loves Raymond for part of season seven and all of season eight, winning an Emmy for his work. Scully co-created (with wife Julie Thacker) The Pitts for Fox and Complete Savages for ABC, which was produced by Mel Gibson. The Pitts was a sitcom about a family suffering from bad luck. Thacker stated the show was designed "as a companion piece for The Simpsons. It had a very cartoony feel to it. We always knew the initial audience for the show would be 12-year-olds to start, and then when families saw that the writing was very Simpsons - like, because many of the writers were from The Simpsons, [we thought] families would start to watch it together." It was canceled after six episodes; Scully and Thacker laid the blame for this on the show's timeslot, 9:30 P.M., which was too late for the target audience. Complete Savages, which Thacker and Scully wrote with the "Simpsons sensibility" of layered jokes, was canceled in January 2005 due to low ratings and network anger at Scully and Thacker's decision to write to TV critics in what the Hartford Courant labelled "unsanctioned promoting". A fan of NRBQ, Scully produced, with Thacker, a documentary about the band in 2003 entitled NRBQ: Rock 'n' Roll's Best Kept Secret; Scully employed the group as the "unofficial house band" of The Simpsons during his tenure as showrunner. Scully also created a pilot for Fox called Schimmel in 2000, starring Robert Schimmel, which was dropped after Schimmel was diagnosed with cancer.

Scully served as a consulting producer on the NBC series Parks and Recreation, and wrote the episodes "Ron and Tammy" in 2009, and "The Possum" in 2010. Scully also had cameo roles in the episodes "Eagleton" and "Soda Tax" as a speaker at the Pawnee community meeting.

In 2012, Scully co-produced and co-wrote an animated TV version of the film Napoleon Dynamite, which was canceled after six episodes. That May, Scully signed a seven-figure, multiyear overall deal with 20th Century Fox Television to develop several projects. He served as co-executive producer on the single-season NBC sitcom The New Normal (2012–2013), alongside Allison Adler and Ryan Murphy. Scully held the same title for Fox's Dads (which debuted in 2013). In 2018, he signed an overall deal with 20th Century Fox Television.

== Personal life ==
He is married to writer Julie Thacker; the couple have five daughters. His elder brother Brian Scully is also a comedy writer; his younger brother, Neil, is an ice hockey writer. His mother died in 1985. Scully was awarded an honorary doctorate in fine arts from Westfield State University in 2008. While on crutches, Scully walked the picket line during the 2007–2008 WGA strike.

Scully received a lifetime achievement award by the WGA West in 2010.

== Credits ==
Episodes listed are those Scully has been credited as writing or co-writing.

- What a Country! (1986–1987) – writer
- Out of This World (1987–1991) – supervising producer, writer
  - "Baby Talk"
  - "Mosquito Man: The Motion Picture"
  - "Blast from the Past"
  - "Old Flame"
  - "Evie's Two Dads"
  - "Evie Goes to Hollywood"
  - "Whose House Is It, Anyway?"
  - "Evie's Driver's License"
  - "The Rocks That Couldn't Roll"
  - "My Mother the Con"
  - "Goodbye, Mr. Chris"
  - "New Kid on the Block"
  - "Come Fly with Evie"
  - "Would You Buy a Used Car from This Dude?"
  - "Mayor Evie"
- Grand – writer
  - "Lady Luck"
- Top of the Heap (1991) – writer
  - "The Agony and the Agony"
  - "The Marrying Guy"
- The Royal Family (1992) – writer
  - "Cocoa in Charge"
- The Simpsons (1993–2021, 2023) – writer, producer, executive producer, showrunner, consulting producer
  - "Lisa's Rival" (1994)
  - "Lisa on Ice" (1994)
  - "Two Dozen and One Greyhounds" (1995)
  - "Marge Be Not Proud" (1995)
  - "Team Homer" (1996)
  - "Lisa's Date with Density" (1996)
  - "Treehouse of Horror VIII" ("The HΩmega Man") (1997)
  - "Sunday, Cruddy Sunday" (with Tom Martin, George Meyer and Brian Scully) (1999)
  - "Beyond Blunderdome" (1999)
  - "Behind the Laughter" (with Tim Long, George Meyer and Matt Selman) (2000)
  - "The Parent Rap" (with George Meyer) (2001)
  - "How I Spent My Strummer Vacation" (2002)
  - "Iron Marge" (2023)
- The Preston Episodes (1995) – writer
  - "The Halloween Episode" (with Julie Thacker)
- Schimmel (2000) – creator, producer
- The Pitts (2003) – creator, executive producer, writer
- The Boy Who Lost His Schoolbag (2003) - co-creator, writer, executive producer
- Everybody Loves Raymond (2003–2004) – co-executive producer, writer
  - "Fun with Debra"
  - "Party Dress"
  - "Blabbermouths"
  - "Angry Sex"
- Complete Savages (2004–2005) – creator, executive producer, writer
  - "Pilot"
  - "Free Lily"
  - "Thanksgiving with the Savages"
  - "Saving Old Lady Riley"
- The Simpsons Movie (2007) – producer and writer
- Parks and Recreation (2009–2012) – consulting producer and writer
  - "Ron and Tammy" (2009)
  - "The Possum" (2010)
  - "The Comeback Kid" (2012)
- Napoleon Dynamite (2012) – co-developer, producer, writer
  - "FFA"
- The New Normal (2012–2013) – co-executive producer, writer
  - "The Godparent Trap"
  - "Dog Children"
- 70th Golden Globe Awards (2013) – special material
- Dads (2013–2014) – co-executive producer
- Weird Loners (2015) – co-executive producer
- The Carmichael Show (2015–2017) – co-executive producer, writer
  - "Gender"
  - "Fallen Heroes"
  - "Man's World"
  - "Support The Troops"
- Rel (2018–19) – co-executive producer, writer
  - "Kids Visit First"
- Duncanville (2020–2022) – creator, writer
  - "Pilot"
  - "Jack's Pipe Dream" – teleplay by
  - "Free Range Children" – teleplay by
  - "Wolf Mother" – teleplay by
  - "Das Banana Boot" – story by
  - "Duncan's New Word"
  - "Who's Vrooming Who?" – story by
  - "Born to Run (A Small Business)" - written by
- Shifting Gears (2025–present) - creator, writer, executive producer
  - "Pilot"
