= Jerry Gergich =

US TV sitcom character, created 2009

Garry "Jerry" Gergich
- Parks and Recreation character
- Jim O'Heir as Jerry
- First appearance: "Pilot" (2009)
- Last appearance: "A Parks and Recreation Special" (2020)
- Portrayed by: Jim O'Heir

In-universe information
- Nicknames: Jerry; Larry Gengurch; Terry; Garry Gergrench; Garry Girgich; Barry the Mailman
- Gender: Male
- Occupation: Mayor of the City of Pawnee; National Park Service Midwest Region; Employee in the Department of Parks and Recreation (Former); Actor who portrayed “Barry the Mailman” on television
- Spouse: Gayle Gergich
- Children: Millicent Gergich (daughter); Miriam Gergich (daughter); Gladys Gergich (daughter)
- Nationality: Croatian-American

Garry Gergich, also known as Jerry, Barry, Larry or Terry, is a fictional character in the comedy television series Parks and Recreation, portrayed by Jim O'Heir. The character has appeared in every episode of the series, with the exception of the first-season episode "Canvassing". He was credited as a recurring character for the first two seasons, but was promoted to the main cast beginning with season three. Garry is often portrayed as someone that the members of the parks and recreation squad often make fun of.

Jerry's real name is Garry, but he is referred to as Jerry for the first five seasons (for which reason the character is usually referred to by this name in external media). In the last two seasons — as a running joke — the name other characters call him changes, initially to Larry, then to Terry, before finally settling on Garry, with most characters unaware that this is his actual name.

== Overview ==
Garry Gergich, born February 29, 1948 (as mentioned in the season 4 episode "Sweet Sixteen") presumably in Pennsylvania (by stating the first three digits of his Social Security Number as “210” in season 4 episode 13 “Bowling for Votes”), is a longstanding employee of the Department of Parks and Recreation who is nearing retirement and is a married father of three girls. He first speaks in the Season 1 episode, "The Reporter". His job performance is middling and unspectacular, and he places more importance on his happy home life. Jerry is content to do simple, repetitive tasks.

His surname was first mentioned in the episode "Park Safety". He is often the butt of jokes and is regularly mocked by his co-workers, with his most frequent detractors being Tom Haverford (Aziz Ansari) and April Ludgate (Aubrey Plaza). Although he very rarely joins in the teasing, Ron Swanson (Nick Offerman) describes Jerry as someone who "shrivels up when you shine a light on him," insisting Jerry does his best work alone. Ron also describes Jerry as both the "schlemiel," and the "schlimazel," of the office, meaning that, at a fancy dinner party, he would be both the person who spills soup and the person upon whom the soup is spilled. Despite this, he is overwhelmingly kind and warm-hearted toward his friends in the Parks Department.

While attempting to avoid getting involved in an office competition to dig up dirt on fellow employees, Pawnee PD Officer David Sanderson (Louis C.K.) embarrasses Jerry by telling those present in the Parks office that Jerry has been arrested several times for public urination. It is also openly revealed that he is adopted, a fact previously unknown to Jerry himself.

Following a government-wide health screening of male employees in the episode "I'm Leslie Knope", Dr. Harris (Cooper Thornton) reveals to the camera that Jerry possesses the largest penis he has ever seen. Like many positive things in Jerry's life, this is never revealed to his colleagues.

He has heart problems; he mentions he has a pacemaker in the episode "Woman of the Year", and had a heart attack in "Halloween Surprise".

Some episodes feature characters discovering an appreciation for Jerry. In "Ron and Diane", after mentioning an annual tradition they take part in called "Jerry Dinner" where they all dine at a fancy restaurant, funds risen from each of them contributing money each time Jerry does something embarrassing; April, Donna, Tom and Andy realize they have not been invited to the Gergiches' Christmas party. A guilty Donna, prior to realizing the Christmas party was occurring, decided to bring Jerry himself to the dinner, and is invited into the party, but the rest are left outside in the cold. However, they later realize that their invitations had just gotten sent to the spam folder in their respective e-mails, and April decides to give Jerry the entire "Jerry Dinner" fund. Another instance in "Jerry's Retirement", Tom finds Jerry's attraction of all the office mockery to be useful for him, and he and Ron conspire to have Jerry brought out of retirement and back into the department. At the end of season 6, Leslie hires Jerry (then called Larry) as part of her National Park Service administration team.

He is artistically talented, with several stellar original paintings he made shown throughout the series (including a pointillist rendering of Pawnee) though these talents are not appreciated by his colleagues. He is moreover a skilled pianist, playing Brahms' waltz op 39 no 15 in the "Telethon" episode (which bores his colleagues), and playing at home to accompany his singing daughters and wife.

Jerry also appears to be a talented engineer, having developed a clean renewable power source which he presents in "Second Chunce" but then accidentally destroys by sneezing on it.

Jerry is an ordained minister, and officiates at Leslie's and Ben's wedding. His happy home life, stunningly attractive wife Gayle (Christie Brinkley), and three daughters bemuse his co-workers who only know him from the office. One of Jerry's daughters, Millicent (Sarah Wright), dates Chris Traeger (Rob Lowe) for much of season 4.

In "Two Funerals", city manager Ben Wyatt (Adam Scott) searches for an interim mayor to replace the recently deceased Mayor Gunderson. After a fruitless search Ben realizes Garry (as he is then called) is the ideal candidate. In the flash forwards in the final episode it is shown that Mayor Gergich is repeatedly reelected in earnest, serving ten terms. These flash forwards show that Garry dies on his 100th birthday, after celebrating with several generations of his family and toasting a perfect life. He is buried with much ceremony, attended by possibly the President of the United States (Ben and Leslie are flanked by what appear to be Secret Service agents), but his name is misspelled "Girgich" on his gravestone.

== Development ==
Although Jerry Gergich has been a regular character since the pilot episode of Parks and Recreation, O'Heir having originally read for the role of Ron Swanson, the character's personality was not fully formed until the second season. Series co-creator Michael Schur said they liked O'Heir so much that he cast him immediately and "figured we'd work it out later". Jerry's personality traits began to become established after the episode "Practice Date" when, during a contest to see who could find the most dirt on each other, city planner Mark Brendanawicz inadvertently reveals that Jerry was adopted. O'Heir was thrilled by this because it meant that the show's writers were interested in developing his character. Schur said after that script, "We realized that’s who he is: He’s the guy who wants to put his head down and get his pension, but is asking for it all the time. In the next three scripts, it was like throwing chum into the water. Every script after that had 15 slams on Jerry." Once this personality was established, the writers felt it important to establish that the other characters liked Jerry, despite their constant mockery of him. O'Heir said in an interview that whenever his co-stars apologize for being mean to him during a scene, he tells them "You're not doing it to Jim. We're all actors". The episode "Park Safety" was written as a result.

== Critical reception ==
Several critics have praised both the writing of the character, as well as O'Heir's performance. Hitfix writer Daniel Fienberg praised Jim O'Heir, saying, "Even the background players have begun to shine, including Jim O'Heir's hard-luck Jerry, who I've crowned my favorite tertiary character on TV." O'Heir received particularly positive reviews after the episode "Park Safety."

== Name ==
The character's name has been a running joke over the course of the series. For most of the series run he is known as "Jerry Gergich". In season four, it is twice-stated that Jerry's real name is Garry, but since his original boss misheard him when he introduced himself on his first day on the job, he has gone by Jerry ever since. In the episode "Telethon", his name is misspelled as "Gerry Grgich" on the television. From the season 6 episode "Doppelgängers" everyone starts calling him "Larry Gengurch" at the encouragement of April, a situation "Larry" meekly accepts with little protest. In "Ann and Chris", the men of the department give Chris a gift with their initials on it. Jerry signed it GJLGG, which he said stood for "Garry Jerry Larry Gergich Gengurch," as he wasn't sure what names to use.

Following the time jump to 2017 at the end of "Moving Up", he goes by the name of "Terry" - an explanation is given during the season 7 episode "2017" that a new employee that works in the National Park Service also goes by Larry and the group changes his name to Terry. In the season 7 episode "Donna and Joe", Donna puts his name down as "Garry" on a seating placard at her wedding, which prompts April to begin calling him Garry, not recalling that this is his actual name. Throughout season 7, he also appears on Andy's television show The Johnny Karate Super Awesome Musical Explosion Show, playing a character named Mailman Barry, where he is credited as "Garry Gergrench".
