= Jim O'Heir =

American actor (born 1962)

- O'Heir in 2019
- Born: February 4, 1962 (age 64); Blue Island, Illinois, U.S.
- Occupations: Actor, comedian
- Years active: 1987-present

James O'Heir (born February 4, 1962) is an American actor and comedian. He is best known for portraying Jerry Gergich on the NBC sitcom Parks and Recreation.

O'Heir first became active in Chicago theater and improv during the late 1980s and early 1990s as part of the comedic theater troupe "White Noise", and appeared in such plays as The Book of Blanche, Stumpy's Gang and Ad-Nauseam with the group. O'Heir has appeared in several films and made guest appearances on such shows as The Drew Carey Show, Friends, Boston Legal, Malcolm in the Middle, Star Trek: Voyager, 3rd Rock from the Sun, ER, Parenthood, Brooklyn Nine-Nine, and Better Call Saul.

In 2000, he starred in the Comedy Central series Strip Mall as Harvey Krudup, the husband of protagonist Tammi Tyler, who was played by Julie Brown.

== Early life and education ==
O'Heir was born in Blue Island, Illinois to John and Eileen O’Heir (né O’Keefe) and was raised in nearby Lansing, Illinois. He is a graduate of the Thornton Fractional South High School in Lansing, Illinois, and of Loyola University Chicago.

== Career ==
=== Theatre ===
O'Heir was active in the Chicago theater during the late 1980s and early 1990s, training and performing improvisational comedy at Chicago's Second City and as a member of the six-person sketch comedy troupe "White Noise", which formed in 1987. The group wrote and produced comedic plays that often employed bizarre humor or black comedy. Starting in November 1988, O'Heir appeared in White Noise's production of The Book of Blanche, about a woman who falls through a television screen and ends up in a fantasy world influenced by various television show genres. In July 1989, O'Heir appeared in the Chicago premiere of the Tom Griffin play The Boys Next Door at the Edgewater Theatre Center. O'Heir played Norman Bulansky, a childlike middle-aged mentally handicapped man who works at a doughnut shop.

Starting in 1990, O'Heir appeared in White Noise's Stumpy's Gang, a one-act black comedy play by Patrick Cannon. The show played at Stage Left and Strawdog Theatres in Chicago, where it developed a cult following. O'Heir played Frank Bubman, the janitor for a genetics laboratory whose job is to destroy the unsuccessful experiments, which are portrayed by puppets. Frank secretly uses the experiments to stage private shows reminiscent of early television programs. Mary Shen Barnidge of the Chicago Reader said of his performance, "The grotesquely ursine Jim O'Heir adds a new dimension to the role of the enfant terrible with his uninhibited and enthusiastic portrayal of Frank, who will break your heart even as he turns your stomach." Ernest Tucker of the Chicago Sun-Times described O'Heir's performance as very funny and "unforgettable", and said he "held together this funny yet sick apocalyptic fantasy". Stumpy's Gang closed in the fall of 1991. Also with White Noise, O'Heir appeared in the play Ad-Nauseam, about a pair of writers who create an ad campaign about a character named Rim Shot, played by O'Heir, dressed in a gladiator costume made up of bristle brushes and toilet detritus.

In 2005, O'Heir played the inmate Dale Harding in Dale Wasserman's stage adaption of One Flew Over the Cuckoo's Nest at The Theatre District in Hollywood, California. Backstage writer Terri Roberts said O'Heir stood out among the show's cast.

=== Film ===
O'Heir appeared in the 1996 baseball comedy film Ed and 1998 fantasy television film Harvey. He also appeared in the 2007 family drama film Welcome to Paradise!!!. O'Heir played Hathaway in the 2016 film, Range 15.

In 2020, Variety announced O'Heir was joining the cast of the Chris Blake quarantine comedy, Distancing Socially. The film was shot at the height of the COVID-19 pandemic in 2020, using remote technologies and the iPhone 11. The film was acquired and released by Cinedigm in October 2021.

=== Television ===
O'Heir has appeared in several television shows since the 1990s and 2000s, including 3rd Rock from the Sun, The Drew Carey Show, Malcolm in the Middle, Just Shoot Me, Star Trek: Voyager, Suite Life of Zack and Cody and ER. Starting in 2000, O'Heir starred in a regular role in the Comedy Central series Strip Mall as Harvey Krudup, the unattractive husband of protagonist Tammi Tyler, who was played by Julie Brown. The character is the owner of the Starbrite Cleaners business, and Tammi marries him under the false assumption that he is rich. After learning Harvey is not wealthy, Tammi makes numerous attempts to have him murdered.

In November 2003, he made a guest appearance in the tenth season episode of Friends, "The One With the Birth Mother", where he played the manager of an adoption agency. On November 28, 2004, he appeared in the Boston Legal episode "Loose Lips", where he played a man fired from being a department store Santa Claus because he is a cross dresser.

Starting in 2009, O'Heir became a regular supporting cast member of the NBC comedy series Parks and Recreation. He originally auditioned for the role of Ron Swanson, before being cast as Jerry Gergich, a clumsy employee at a local government parks department who is routinely mocked by his co-workers who also called him one of four names, Jerry, Larry, Terry, and Garry. Although the character was featured in the series since the first episode, he started to become more fully developed and play larger roles in the episodes during the second season. The episode "Park Safety", in which Jerry pretends to have been mugged in order to avoid being made fun of for an injury, was focused almost entirely around Jerry and drew positive reviews for O'Heir's comedic performance.

In 2011, O'Heir made a guest appearance on the NBC comedy-drama series Parenthood as a bar owner. In 2013, he guest-starred on Good Luck Charlie as a couch surgeon and the owner of a couch store, and later in the year he had a main role in the Ion Television movie My Santa, as Jack, Santa's right-hand man. That same year, he appeared on Jimmy Kimmel Live as real-life Toronto mayor Rob Ford, who had recently been involved in a crack-smoking scandal. In 2016, he appeared as Sheriff Reynolds in two episodes of Brooklyn Nine-Nine. In 2016, he voiced the character "Aiden" on Harvey Beaks, the grandfather of the titular character.

In 2017, O'Heir won a Daytime Emmy for Outstanding Guest Performer in a Drama Series for The Bold and the Beautiful.

=== Podcasting ===
In April 2023, O'Heir replaced Rob Lowe as co-host of the Parks and Recollection podcast, a Parks and Recreation recap show.

== Filmography ==
=== Film ===
Year	Title	Role	Notes
1996	Ed	Art	
1998	Spike	Michael	Short film
1999	H@	Bank Manager (voice)	Short film
2000	In God We Trust	Foreman	Short film
2001	Mimic 2	Lou	
2006	Accepted	Sherman Schrader II	
2006	Comedy Hell	Wilford	
2007	Welcome to Paradise	Fred Fargo	
2011	Grow Up Already	Dad	Short film
2012	Seeking a Friend for the End of the World	Sheriff	
2013	Mediating Kidnapper	Doug	Short film
2013	Armed Response	Norval	
2013	Boats	The Boss	Short film
2014	Naughty & Nice	Harper	
2014	Life After Beth	Chip the Mailman	
2014	The Turtle's Head	Dr. Friel	Short film
2015	If I Could Tell You	Jim	Short film
2015	Road Hard	Mark Davis	
2015	Life in Color	Bill Winters	
2015	Bad Night	Bob	
2015	Spare Change	Don	
2015	Helen Keller vs. Nightwolves	Vance	
2016	Mind Over Mindy	Mr. Dick Wiener	
2016	Halloweed	Mayor Price	
2016	The Dust Storm	Steve Bundy	
2016	Middle Man	Lenny	
2016	Range 15	Scientist Hathaway	
2016	Astronaut Camp	Harry	Short film
2017	Take Me	Stuart	
2017	Landline	Steve Gout	
2017	Logan Lucky	Cal	
2018	Dance Baby Dance	Mr. Dalrymple	
2018	Bad Times at the El Royale	Milton Wyrick	
2018	When Jeff Tried to Save the World	Carl	
2019	The Last Whistle	Ted	
2021	Violet	Dennis Fitcher	
2021	Hero Mode	James	
2021	Distancing Socially	Kelly	

=== Television ===
Year	Title	Role	Notes
1996	Harvey	Duane Wilson	Television film
1996	The Rockford Files: Godfather Knows Best	Head Chef	Television film
1996	Party of Five	Plumber #1	Episode: "Deal With It"
1996	ER	McKenna	Episode: "Last Call"
1996	3rd Rock from the Sun	Walt	Episode: "Gobble, Gobble, Dick, Dick"
1996	Pearl	Delivery Guy	Episode: "Christmas Daze"
1997	Ellen	Kelsy	Episode: "G.I. Ellen"
1997–2002	Just Shoot Me!	Howie, Big Dan	2 episodes
1998	Step by Step	Tom Garilick	Episode: "Pain in the Class"
1998	Mr. Murder	Swimmer's Father	Television
1998	The Drew Carey Show	The Maintenance Guy / Man in the Moon	2 episodes
1998	The Love Boat: The Next Wave	Vince Deering	Episode: "All That Glitters"
1999	Working	Fryer Lawrence	Episode: "Romeo and Julie"
1999	Diagnosis: Murder	Howard Weber	Episode: "Voices Carry"
1999	Ally McBeal	Steve Mallory	Episode: "Saving Santa"
2000	Martial Law	Dr. Cheery Tooth	Episode: "Freefall"
2000	Star Trek: Voyager	Husband	Episode: "Critical Care"
2000	Popular	Warner	Episode: "Are You There God? It's Me Ann-Margret"
2000	The Norm Show	Mr. Wooten	Episode: "Norm vs. Schoolin"
2000–2001	Strip Mall	Harv Krudup	22 episodes
2001	Malcolm in the Middle	Roy	Episode: "Book Club"
2001	The Huntress	Businessman	Episode: "The Hunted/Vegas: Part 2"
2001	Dharma & Greg	Chief R J Anderson	Episode: "Educating Dharma: Part 1"
2002	George Lopez	Reggie / Pete	2 episodes
2003	Grounded for Life	Harry	Episode: "Your Father Should Know: Part 1"
2004	Friends	Adoption Agency Worker	Episode: "The One with the Birth Mother"
2004	American Dreams	Big Arnie	2 episodes
2004	Cold Case	Ned Ryan	Episode: "Maternal Instincts"
2004	Boston Legal	Gil Furnald	Episode: "Loose Lips"
2005	Less than Perfect	Russell	Episode: "I Just Don't Like Her"
2005	Jane Doe: Vanishing Act	Air Traffic Controller	Television film
2005	Without a Trace	Mr. Ricker	Episode: "End Game"
2006	Falling in Love with the Girl Next Door	Reverend Mayfield	Television film
2006	The Suite Life of Zack & Cody	Maynard's Dad	Episode: "Neither a Borrower Nor a Speller Bee"
2006	Desperate Housewives	Sam Killian	Episode: "I Know Things Now"
2006	Monk	Park Ranger	Episode: "Mr. Monk and the Big Game"
2007	State of Mind	Administrator	Episode: "Lost and Found"
2007	Saving Grace	Mitch Duncan	Episode: "A Language of Angels"
2007	Curb Your Enthusiasm	Detective	Episode: "The Therapists"
2008	Swingtown	Mr. Stone	Episode: "Friends with Benefits"
2008	Raising the Bar	D.A. Thomas Sheridan	Episode: "Guatemala Gulfstream"
2009	Safe Harbor	Mr. Cook	Television film
2009	Castle	Hal Rossi	Episode: "The Double Down"
2009–2015, 2020	Parks and Recreation	Jerry Gergich	123 episodes
2011	Parenthood	Pete	Episode: "Qualities and Difficulties"
2011	Rizzoli & Isles	Dr. Little	Episode: "Don't Hate the Player"
2012	CollegeHumor Originals	John Adams	Episode: "Declaration of Email Signatures"
2012	The Mentalist	Norris	Episode: "The Crimson Ticket"
2012	The House on South Bronson	Jim	Episode: "Mansitting"
2013	Vegas	Bank Manager	Episode: "Scoundrels"
2013	Good Luck Charlie	Alan	Episode: "Teddy's New Beau"
2013	It's Always Sunny in Philadelphia	Doctor	Episode: "The Gang Gets Quarantined"
2013	My Santa	Jack	Television film
2013	Non-Stop	Howard	Television film
2013	The Wrong Woman	Ed	Television film
2014	Math Bites	Celebrity Guy / Singing Flower Head	2 episodes
2014	Geek Cred	New Guy	Episode: "Detective Comics Store"
2014	Switched at Birth	Chuck Conroy	Episode: "It Isn't What You Think"
2014	Fatal Acquittal	Greyson	Television film
2015	Hot in Cleveland	Ross	Episode: "Kitchen Nightmare"
2015	I Didn't Do It	Principal McLean	Episode: "Cheer Up Girls"
2015	Austin & Ally	Santa	Episode: "Santas & Surprises"
2016	These People	Tom	Episode: "Dad"
2016	Kidnapping Lizzie: Nightmare Visions	Detective Williams	Television film
2016	Veep	Mr. Brookheimer	Episode: "Thanksgiving"
2016	Harvey Beaks	Aiden (voice)	Episode: "The New Bugaboo/The Case of the Missing Pancake"
2016	Dr. Havoc's Diary	General Plague (voice)	Web series
2016	Another Period	Attorney	2 episodes
2016	This Isn't Working	Mr. Golden	Episode: "A Very Special Episode"
2016	Brooklyn Nine-Nine	Sheriff Reynolds	2 episodes
2016	Edgar Allan Poe's Murder Mystery Dinner Party	Constable Jim	Mini-series
2016–2019	The Bold and the Beautiful	Matt Cannistra	8 episodes
2017	Speechless	Stu	Episode: "H-e-r-Hero"
2017	Mommy, I Didn't Do It	Ed Flynn	Television film
2017	The Thundermans	Farmer Ted	Episode: "Date of Emergency"
2017	Superior Donuts	Gary	Episode: "Man Without a Health Plan"
2017	A Moving Romance	Neil Wilson	Television film
2017	Bill Nye Saves the World	Rabies	Episode: "Do Some Shots, Save the World"
2017–2018	The Mayor	Ross Gibbage	2 episodes
2018	Alone Together	Warren	Episode: "Pilot"
2018	Trial & Error	Michael Poisson	Episode: "A Hole in the Case"
2019–2020	Bless This Mess	Kent	Recurring
2019	The Unauthorized Bash Brothers Experience	Puka Shell Bob	Television special
2019	Pearson	Police Superintendent Chuck Hargrove	2 episodes
2019	The Neighborhood	Maynard	Episode: "Welcome to the Camping Trip"
2019–2021	Liza on Demand	Don the Landlord	9 episodes
2020	Criminal Minds	Clifford Stinson	Episode: "Face Off"
2020	Big City Greens	Other Bill Green (voice)	Episode: "Animal Farm"
2021	Call Me Kat	Jordan Luther	Episode: "Gym"
2021	9-1-1	Don Blevins	Episode: "First Responders"
2021	United States of Al	Ted Begley	Episode: "Fundraiser/Baspana Towlawal"
2021	Little Ellen	Storm King (voice)	Episode: "Don't Rain on My Parade"
2022	American Auto	Governor Tom Harper	Episode: "Millbank, IA"
2022	The Conners	Judge	Episode: "A Judge and a Priest Walk Into a Living Room..."
2022	Better Call Saul	Frank	Episode: "Nippy"
2022	Young Rock	Manager	Episode: "Night of the Chi-Chi's"
2022	The Santa Clauses	Santa 17	Episode: "Chapter Five: Across the Yule-Verse"
2025	Running Point	Irv Plotkin	Episode: "Doljanchi"
2025	Doctor Odyssey	Barry	Episodes: “The Wave” & “The Wave, Part 2”
2025	Murdaugh: Death in the Family	Dick Harpootlian	Miniseries
2026	Rooster	Fred Salewski	Episode: "All the Dogs' Names"
2026	President Curtis	Ed Carol/Santa (voice)	Episode: "Synths"

=== Theatre ===
Year	Title	Role	Notes
2023	Catch Me If You Can	Inspector Detective Levine	Lead
