= Jami Reid-Quarrell =

Scottish actor (born 1978)

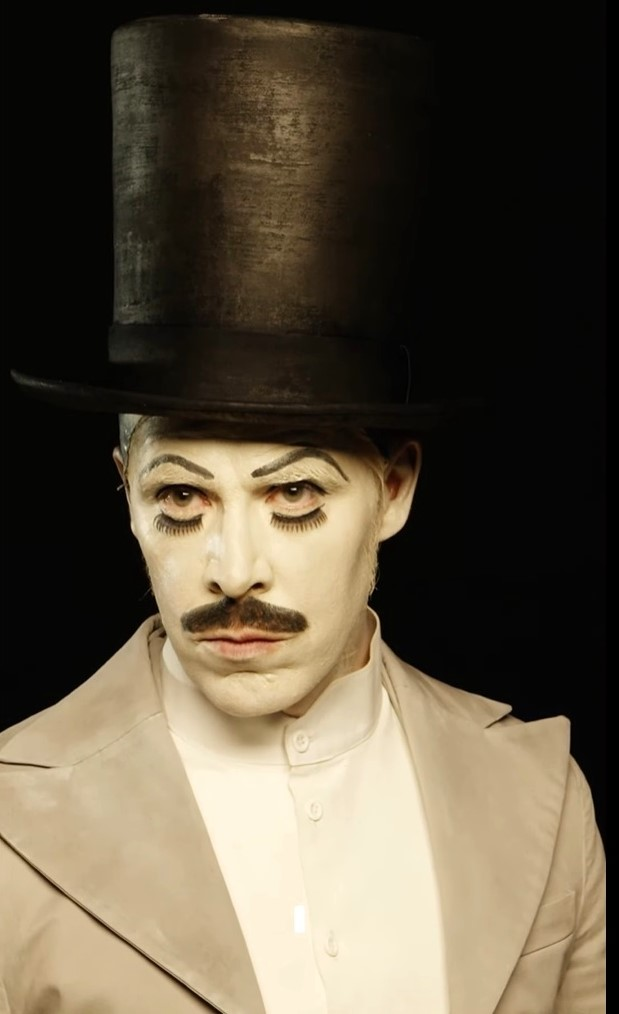
Reid-Quarrel as Puck in A Midsummer Night's Dream opera in 2021

Jami Reid-Quarrell (born 20 January 1978) is a Scottish actor. He is best known for his role as Colony Sarff and the Veil in series 9 of the BBC television series Doctor Who, for which he was voted Best Male Guest Actor of Doctor Who TV in 2015. He is also a singer, physical performer and choreographer who has appeared in numerous theatre, film and TV productions, operas and musicals.

In 2010 he created the role of Dr Gangle for Andrew Lloyd Webber's sequel to Phantom of the Opera, Love Never Dies. His stage appearances include Equus with Daniel Radcliffe, Trevor Nunn's The Tempest with Ralph Fiennes and with physical theatre companies such as Punchdrunk and Frantic Assembly. He has also appeared with such companies as the Royal Opera House, Archaos and the Royal Shakespeare Company. He also choreographs and movement directs for theatre and screen, for shows such as Trevor Nunn and pop videos for Depeche Mode ("Fragile Tension"), Casiokids ("Finn Bikkjen") and Boy Kill Boy ("No Conversation").

== Early life ==
Reid-Quarrell was born in Paisley, Scotland, the son of champion swimmer Marie Reid (née Quarrell) and Glasgow's Big Band Jazz singer Tommy Reid. He has three elder sisters Loretta, Jennifer and Eleanor and one younger sister Caroline. Brought up in Linwood, Renfrewshire, Reid-Quarrell attended St Andrews Primary School (now Our Lady of Peace) and St Brendan's High School. He established himself as a young actor with the Actors Lab at the Strathclyde Arts Centre.

== Theatre ==
Reid-Quarrell started in theatre at the age of 16 at the Actors Lab in Glasgow, Scotland. At 18 years old he was playing the role of Nick in Who's Afraid of Virginia Woolf? and then toured the UK with EPC's The Girl from the Sea before settling in Sligo, Ireland to train in Le Coq and Marceau techniques with the Blue Raincoat Theatre Company where he performed multiple roles in the inaugural production of Scrooge attended by Marcel Marceau himself.

He lived for some time in New York City at the age of 19 where he slept rough while pursuing acting work and training with tutor Tom Grail. Returning to Scotland he initiated a programme of events focusing on the multicultural music scene in Glasgow which culminated in 1996's famous Party in the Park and West End Festival Carnival Parade, a tradition which then carried on for many years after he left Glasgow.

At the age of 23 he moved to London to commence training at The Circus Space in London (now the National Centre for Circus Arts) and subsequently at the Centre National des Arts du Cirque in Châlons-en-Champagne, France. From the French school, he was selected to perform with the acclaimed French Circus-Theatre company Archaos between 1998 and 2000, creating the show INVITRO. He was then cast in the title role of Tarzan in a Dubai-based.

Now a fluent French speaker, he returned to the UK to receive further training whilst working with the Royal Shakespeare Company as part of their ensemble. During this time, he was directed by Matthew Warchus, Michael Boyd and Adrian Noble in The Winter's Tale, The Tempest and Pericles.

He then went on to feature prominently in an early production from immersive theatre pioneers Punchdrunk (playing Tybalt in The Firebird Ball) and subsequently with Frantic Assembly in their highly praised production of Othello. Playing Cassio, the drunk scene was a particular highlight of the production with Reid-Quarrell spouting Shakespearean verse while being spun on a pool table and caught by the other actors.

Around this time he also played the title role in the stage version of MONKEY! for the West Yorkshire Playhouse, directed by Dominic LeClerc. This lead role coupled with his well-received portrayal of Puck for the Royal Opera House proved a stepping stone which brought him to the attention of Andrew Lloyd Webber's team who cast him in the newly created role of Dr Gangle in Love Never Dies, the sequel to The Phantom of the Opera.

In 2011, he was approached by Sir Trevor Nunn to direct the movement and aerial work for this West End production of The Tempest starring Ralph Fiennes. He reprised his role as Puck in A Midsummer Night's Dream for Scottish Opera in 2013 and then again for the Hannover State Opera in 2014.

== Film ==
As a teenage actor, Reid-Quarrell played lead roles in some amateur films by director John Gorman, originator of the event Alien War.. He has also appeared in 28 Weeks Later as infected H and in Bollywood films Kabhi Alvida Naa Kehna and Jhoom Barabar Jhoom as a featured dancer.

== Television ==
Whilst still based in Glasgow, he appeared in STV's High Road as a cabaret performer and in Taggart as a high school pupil. Upon arriving in London, he was chosen to appear in the Spice Girls video for "Who Do You Think You Are" also appearing on BBC's Comic Relief Live Broadcast alongside the Spice Girls and Madness. He filmed a pilot for Ragdoll Productions "Sleepy Fairies" as lead character Sleepyhead and also as Spot for "Bunnytown". As well as the Spice Girls video he has appeared as lead roles in promos for Depeche Mode ("Fragile Tension"), and Boy Kill Boy ("No Conversation").

In 2014 he appeared in the featured role of The Tramp, an homage to Chaplin in the Sony TV pilot "Salad Days" and then filmed a TV and cinema ad campaign for Gordon's Gin as the new character Gordon the Boar.

In 2015 he was cast in the long-running British sci-fi series Doctor Who, and won Doctor Who TV's award for Best Male Guest Actor for his portrayal of the villainous Colony Sarff. He was also the actor behind the Veiled Creature in the series' episode "Heaven Sent". A year later, he went on to make a guest appearance in the show's 2016 spin-off series Class as a school inspector.

== Other work ==
Reid-Quarrell also choreographs and movement directs for theatre and screen including shows for Trevor Nunn and pop videos for Depeche Mode, Casio Kids and Boy Kill Boy. He is also known to compose songs and incidental music for his band Katts&Dawgs as well as for other artists and projects.

== Awards ==
- Triforce Promotions Monologue Slam UK "Champion of Champions" Overall Winner 2009
- DoctorWhoTv.co.uk Best Male Guest Actor 2015

== Filmography ==
Film	Role	Production company	Director
28 Weeks Later	Infected H	DNA Films	Juan Carlos Fresnadillo
Jhoom Bharabar Jhoom	Actor/Dancer	Yash Raj Films (Mumbai)	Shaad Ali
Khabi Alvida Na Kehna	Actor/Dancer	Dharma Productions (Mumbai)	Karan Johar
Silent Scream	Neighbour	BFI Production	David Hayman
Bent	Golden Boy	Channel Four Films/MGM	Sean Mathias
Today, Tomorrow, Forever	Jed	Film 4/Small Tree Productions	Robin Coulthard
Arch Enemy	Patrice	A.E. Productions	Martin Morrison
Mr Pumpkinhead	Jamie	JG Productions	John Gorman
Shadowlands	The Boy	JG Productions	John Gorman

== Music ==
In December 2013 his group "Katts & Dawgs" released their Beautiful Fool Beautiful Freak EP.
