= Parks and Recreation season 1 =

Parks and Recreation
- Season 1
- DVD cover art
- Showrunner: Michael Schur
- Starring: Amy Poehler; Rashida Jones; Paul Schneider; Aziz Ansari; Nick Offerman; Aubrey Plaza
- No. of episodes: 6

Release
- Original network: NBC
- Original release: April 9 – May 14, 2009

Season chronology
- Next → Season 2

The first season of Parks and Recreation originally aired in the United States on the NBC television network between April 9 and May 14, 2009. Produced by Deedle-Dee Productions and Universal Media Studios, the series was created by Greg Daniels and Michael Schur, who served as executive producers with Howard Klein. The season stars Amy Poehler, Rashida Jones, Paul Schneider, Aziz Ansari, Nick Offerman, and Aubrey Plaza.

The comedy series focuses on Leslie Knope (Poehler), the deputy director of the Parks and Recreation Department of the fictional town of Pawnee, Indiana. The season consisted of six 22-minute episodes, all of which aired at 8:30 p.m. on Thursdays. Daniels and Schur conceived the show when NBC officials asked Daniels to produce a spin-off of his comedy series The Office, on which Schur was a writer. During development, the creators decided the new show would be a stand-alone series, though it would share the mockumentary style of The Office. Like that show, Parks and Recreation encouraged improvisation among its cast members.

Early test screenings were poor, and many critics and industry observers were skeptical about the show's chances of success. The first season received generally mixed reviews, and several commentators found it too similar to The Office. The premiere episode was watched by 6.77 million viewers, but the viewership declined almost every week in the Nielsen ratings. A season low of 4.25 million viewers watched the final episode, "Rock Show". Despite the low rating, "Rock Show" received the best reviews of the season and convinced some critics that the series had finally found the right tone.

== Cast ==
=== Main ===
- Amy Poehler as Leslie Knope, the deputy director of the Pawnee parks department, who has not let politics dampen her sense of optimism; her ultimate goal is to become President of the United States. She has a strong love for her home town of Pawnee, and desires to use her position to improve it.
- Rashida Jones as Ann Perkins, a nurse who begins a friendship with Leslie after they collaborate to turn an empty pit next to Ann's house into a park. She slowly becomes more involved in the Pawnee government as a result of her friendship with Leslie.
- Paul Schneider as Mark Brendanawicz, a city planner with the Pawnee municipal government. He has long been disillusioned with government after being unable to achieve his career ambitions. Leslie harbors a strong crush on Mark due to a romantic encounter they had several years ago, but Mark does not return her feelings. Mark assists Leslie with her plan to turn the pit next to Ann's house into a park, despite believing that the plan has no chance of success.
- Aziz Ansari as Tom Haverford, Leslie's self-absorbed and underachieving subordinate. While he is an employee at the parks department, he cares little about his job, and instead focusing on his entrepreneurial ambitions. He takes great pride in his personal appearance and regularly pursues women despite being married.
- Nick Offerman as Ron Swanson, the cynical director of the parks department and Leslie's boss. He holds very negative views on politics and government, and regularly works to make his department as inefficient as possible. This leads him to butt heads with Leslie on a number of occasions, as her philosophy regarding politics is the polar opposite. Despite ideological differences, both he and Leslie have a large amount of respect for one another.
- Aubrey Plaza as April Ludgate, an apathetic young intern at the parks department. She cares little for her internship, and often shows annoyance at having to complete tasks. Due to her rebellious and emotionless attitude, she is often annoyed by her co-workers, especially Leslie.

=== Recurring ===
- Chris Pratt as Andy Dwyer, Ann's boyfriend and lead singer of a band called "Mouse Rat". Before the start of the series, Andy falls into the pit next to Ann's house and breaks both his legs. Andy is shown to be immature and lazy, expecting Ann to pamper him non-stop while his legs are broken.
- Jim O'Heir as Jerry Gergich, an incompetent and widely ridiculed employee at the parks department.
- Retta as Donna Meagle, the no-nonsense office manager at the parks department.
- Pamela Reed as Marlene Griggs-Knope, Leslie's mother. Marlene is a successful politician and figure in Pawnee's school system. Due to her success, Leslie constantly strives to impress her mother, despite the fact that Marlene has low expectations regarding her daughter's success. Marlene is also significantly less optimistic when it comes to politics, and is not above making under-the-table deals to get what she wants.

=== Guest stars ===
- Alison Becker as Shauna Malwae-Tweep, a newspaper journalist for The Pawnee Journal.
- Brian Huskey as Morgan, a sex offender who expresses interest in the park for dubious reasons.
- Jim Meskimen as Martin Housely, an MC at many special events around Pawnee.
- Lennon Parham as Kate Speevak, a mother who opposes the construction of Leslie's park.
- Phil Reeves as Paul Iaresco, the Pawnee city manager who supports Leslie's plan for a new park.
- Ian Roberts as Ian Winston, an angry citizen who complains about lewd behavior in one of Pawnee's parks.
- Cooper Thornton as Dr. Harris, Ann's boss at Pawnee's hospital.
- Jama Williamson as Wendy Haverford, a surgeon and Tom's attractive wife.

== Episodes ==
^{†} denotes an extended episode.

Parks and Recreation, season 1 episodes
No. overall	No. in season	Title	Directed by	Written by	Original release date	U.S. viewers (millions)
1	1	"Pilot"	Greg Daniels	Greg Daniels & Michael Schur	April 9, 2009	6.88
Ann Perkins (Rashida Jones) attends a town meeting to ask that a construction pit be filled in after her boyfriend, Andy (Chris Pratt), fell into it and broke his legs. Leslie Knope (Amy Poehler), a mid-level bureaucrat in the Pawnee parks and recreation department, promises to help turn the pit into a beautiful park. She is helped by Tom Haverford (Aziz Ansari) and her former lover, city planner Mark Brendanawicz (Paul Schneider). Her boss, Ron Swanson (Nick Offerman), who believes in as little government interference as possible, initially refuses to greenlight the project. But Mark, impressed with Leslie’s optimism, convinces Ron to approve it by calling in a favor.
2	2	"Canvassing"	Seth Gordon	Rachel Axler	April 16, 2009	6.02
Leslie and the pit subcommittee canvas neighborhood houses to generate support for her park project and enroll attendees for an upcoming town meeting. The plan does not go as expected, especially when Tom detaches from the group and starts using questionable tactics, such as seeking favors from developers in return for preferential treatment. Leslie hopes the public meeting will impress her mother, local school official Marlene Griggs-Knope (Pamela Reed). However, the park's supporters do not attend and opponents turn out in large numbers to voice their disapproval. The project is nearly voted down, but Leslie resorts to a filibuster to save it.
3	3	"The Reporter"	Jeffrey Blitz	Dan Goor	April 23, 2009	5.26
Leslie invites a local reporter (Alison Becker) to write a story about the pit, but the interviews go badly. Fearful of a negative story, Leslie asks Mark to talk to the reporter, but is jealous after Mark sleeps with her. When Leslie confronts Mark, he angrily quits the pit subcommittee. Ann convinces Mark to make up with Leslie and dissuade the reporter from using much of her negative material. Although the story is still largely unfavorable, Leslie remains optimistic. Meanwhile, Tom tries to advance his career by purposely losing online Scrabble games to his boss, Ron.
4	4	"Boys' Club"	Michael McCullers	Alan Yang	April 30, 2009	5.07
As Andy cleans up the house to surprise Ann, Leslie tries to infiltrate the boys' club of politics by crashing an after-work gathering at Pawnee Town Hall. Trying to fit in, she opens a gift basket worth more than $25, breaking the local government ethics laws. She apologetically refers Pawnee officials to a website about the pit to highlight her accomplishments, but gets in more trouble when underage intern April Ludgate (Aubrey Plaza) posts a video of herself drinking on the site. Leslie is called before an ethics committee, but is let off with a warning after Ron, who despises the town's disciplinary process, defends her. Leslie is pleased when Mark tells her the warning officially makes her a member of the boys' club.
5	5	"The Banquet"	Beth McCarthy-Miller	Tucker Cawley	May 7, 2009	4.73
During a banquet honoring her mother's public service, Leslie tries to convince a local zoning official to support her proposed park project. The official resists the idea, so Leslie's mother suggests Leslie blackmail her with information about her husband's drinking problem. Leslie reluctantly goes along with the idea, but soon becomes uncomfortable with the seamy side of politics and decides not to go through with it. Meanwhile, Tom and Mark ditch the festivities to pick up women at a bar, but Mark finds he preferred hanging out with Leslie and Ann at the banquet.
6	6	"Rock Show"^{†}	Michael Schur	Norm Hiscock	May 14, 2009	4.29
Leslie attends what she believes is a business meeting with an elderly local government bigwig, unaware that her mother has secretly set her up on a blind date. An angry Ann learns Andy could have had his leg casts removed weeks ago, but lied about them so Ann would keep pampering him. Mark, disillusioned with his career, makes a pass at Ann, which she harshly rejects. Leslie and Mark end up drinking beer together by the pit and Mark tries to kiss her, but she refuses because he is drunk. Mark stumbles into the pit.

== Production ==
=== Crew ===
Deedle-Dee Productions and Universal Media Studios produced the first season of Parks and Recreation; series creators Greg Daniels and Michael Schur were executive producers with Howard Klein. Dana Gould, Morgan Sackett and Amy Poehler produced, and Tucker Cawley and Norm Hiscock served as consulting producers. Daniel J. Goor was the executive story editor for the season, and Rachel Axler was a story editor. Dean Holland, an editor on The Office, also worked as an editor on Parks and Recreation's first season. Mike Scully, a former executive producer and show runner for The Simpsons, joined Parks and Recreation as a consulting producer starting with the episode "Boys' Club". Cawley left the show at the end of the first season to create the short-lived ABC sitcom Hank, starring Kelsey Grammer. Gould left to focus on his stand-up career. The other producers all returned for the second season. Allison Jones, who worked as a casting director for The Office, served in the same capacity for Parks and Recreation, along with Nancy Perkins, for whom the character Ann Perkins was named.

The pilot episode was directed by Greg Daniels, and the season finale was directed by Michael Schur, his debut in the position. Other directors included Seth Gordon, director of the documentary The King of Kong: A Fistful of Quarters; Jeffrey Blitz, who had directed numerous episodes of The Office; Michael McCullers, co-writer of the first two Austin Powers films, who directed Poehler in the comedy film Baby Mama; and Beth McCarthy Miller, a longtime television director who worked with Poehler on the sketch comedy show Saturday Night Live. Daniels and Schur wrote the pilot episode, and the rest of the season's episodes were written by Axler, Goor, Hiscock, Cawley and Alan Yang.

=== Cast ===
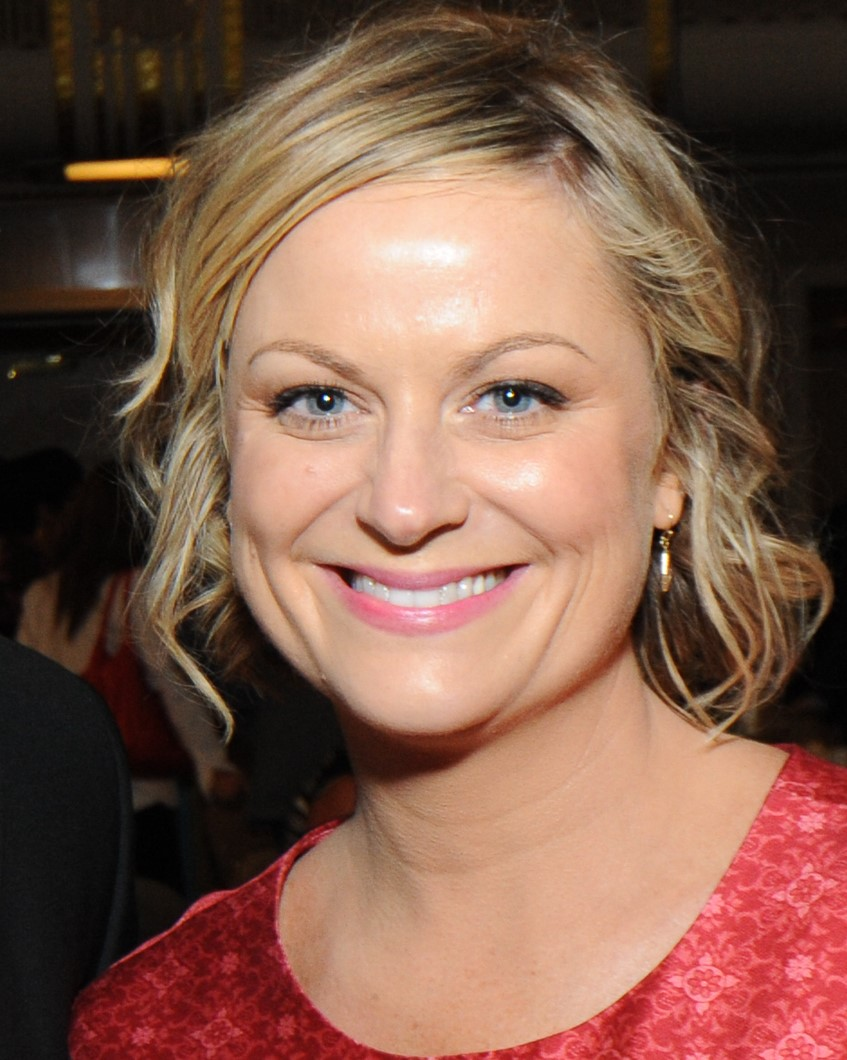
The concept for Parks and Recreation came together only after producers learned Amy Poehler (pictured) would be available to play the protagonist.

A principal cast of six actors received star billing in the show's first season. Poehler portrayed the lead character, Leslie Knope, the naive but well-meaning, eager-to-please deputy director of the parks and recreation department of the fictional town of Pawnee, Indiana. Poehler said, upon reading the script provided by Michael Schur, "it took me five minutes to realize Leslie Knope was the best character ever written for me". She also felt it took a few episodes before she started "feeling my groove" with the character, but came to realize the cast was extremely talented and "would eventually become like family". Other stars in the cast included Aziz Ansari as Tom Haverford, a sarcastic parks department employee, and Rashida Jones as Ann Perkins, a nurse who befriends Leslie and tries to help her turn a giant construction pit into a park. Daniels and Schur intended to cast Ansari and Jones (who previously appeared in The Office as Karen Filippelli) from the series' earliest stages of development, but the ultimate Parks and Recreation concept did not coalesce until they learned Poehler would be available to star. After her recruitment, the general concept of the series was established and the script for the pilot episode was written.

Nick Offerman portrayed Ron Swanson, the director of the parks and recreation department. Offerman had previously auditioned for a part on The Office, and Schur was impressed with his comedic talents and wanted to cast him, but then Offerman became unavailable because he appeared on Will & Grace, a show starring his wife, Megan Mullally. Schur said, "I just wrote his name down on a post-it note and stuck it to my computer and said, 'Someday, I'm going to figure out what to do with that guy.'" Aubrey Plaza played April Ludgate, a sarcastic and uninterested college intern. The part was written specifically for Plaza. After meeting her, casting director Allison Jones told Schur, "I just met the weirdest girl I've ever met in my life. You have to meet her and put her on your show." Schur confirmed this story, saying "Aubrey came over to my office and made me feel really uncomfortable for like an hour, and immediately I wanted to put her in the show." Although the writers were not immediately sure what direction her character would take. Rounding out the main cast was Paul Schneider, best known for his work in independent films such as Lars and the Real Girl and The Assassination of Jesse James by the Coward Robert Ford. He was cast as Mark Brendanawicz, a city planner and Leslie's unrequited love interest. She still harbors feelings for Mark from a one-night sexual encounter years ago. Schneider said that early in the season he was insecure in the role because he was still trying to figure out the character's motivations. Chris Pratt played Andy Dwyer, Ann's well-intentioned but lazy and simple-minded boyfriend. Although Pratt appeared in every episode of season 1, he was credited as guest star until the second season, when he was promoted to the main cast. Andy was originally supposed to appear only in the first season, but the producers liked Pratt so much that, almost immediately after casting him, they decided to make Andy a regular character if the show was renewed.

Jim O'Heir and Retta made regular appearances as Jerry Gergich and Donna Meagle, two fellow employees at the Pawnee parks and recreation department. The personalities of the two characters did not become developed until the second season, but Schur said the Parks and Recreation staff liked the actors, so they decided to include them in the show and "figured we'd work it out later". Pamela Reed made several appearances as Marlene Griggs-Knope, Leslie's mother and an important figure in the Pawnee school system. Seth Gordon, who directed Reed in her first episode, "Canvassing", said she improvised a great deal during her audition, creating many elements that helped define Marlene's character. Jama Williamson appeared in "Rock Show" as Wendy, the attractive surgeon wife of Tom Haverford. Wendy would make numerous appearances in season 2, during which it was revealed that the Haverfords have a green card marriage. Eric Edelstein guest starred in two season 1 episodes, "Canvassing" and "Boys' Club", as Lawrence, a disgruntled neighbor of Andy's.

=== Conception ===
I think we were feeling that the first six episodes were like one big pilot, we shot it so fast. But we had plenty of ideas about what we wanted to do, and part of what takes time is learning how to write for and collaborate with the actors.

— Greg Daniels
series co-creator

Immediately after Ben Silverman was named co-chairman of NBC's entertainment division in 2007, he asked Greg Daniels to create a spin-off of The Office, the half-hour comedy Daniels adapted from the British comedy of the same name, created by Ricky Gervais. The idea of an Office spin-off stemmed from a subplot from the show's third season that followed characters in an office branch in Stamford, Connecticut, separate from the show's other characters, who were in Scranton, Pennsylvania. Silverman felt it could have served as its own series and began asking Daniels about the possibility of a spinoff. Daniels resisted the idea for several years out of fears of diluting the quality of The Office, but Silverman eventually insisted upon a new show. Daniels co-created Parks and Recreation with Michael Schur, who had been a writer on The Office. Like Daniels, Schur had previously worked on the NBC sketch comedy show Saturday Night Live. The two spent months considering ideas for the new series and debating whether to make it a stand-alone show rather than a spin-off, with many of those conversations taking place at Norm's Diner in Van Nuys.

According to Daniels, they eventually abandoned the original spin-off plan because they "couldn't find the right fit". Daniels and Schur considered two "frontrunner ideas" about a family show done as a mockumentary, and a "mockumentary version of The West Wing", which they felt could make the new show focus on the public sector in the same way that The Office was about the private sector. They also considered a series about a local government official trying to rebuild a political career following a humiliating public spectacle, but ultimately abandoned the idea. However, it was ultimately incorporated into the backstory for Ben Wyatt, the character played by Adam Scott who was added late in the second season. Daniels and Schur specifically sought to avoid making a political show about a "hypocrite running for office" or "bureaucrat who just makes everything impossible", which they felt were clichéd and overdone stereotypes. After Poehler agreed to play the lead, they decided the show would revolve around an optimistic bureaucrat in small-town government. Schur said they sought to portray a "very optimistic kind of can-do spirit type person in the middle of (a) really Byzantine world (and) frustrating world".

The idea was partly inspired by the portrayal of local politics on the HBO drama series The Wire, as well as the renewed interest in and optimism about politics stemming from the 2008 United States presidential election. Schur said they wanted to focus on government's involvement in people's lives at a "very micro level" because, during the Great Recession, there was a great deal of discussion and speculation about "a new Great Depression-era intervention in people's lives". The writing staff was also drawn to the idea of building a show around a female relationship, namely Leslie Knope and Ann Perkins. Reports that Daniels and Schur were developing a show together led to press speculation that it would, in fact, be a spin-off of The Office. The producers insisted their new series would be entirely independent. Nevertheless, their concept for it shared several elements with The Office, particularly the mockumentary approach, which allows the actors to look at and directly address the camera. The new show would also include documentary-style interviews, in which the characters speak one-on-one with the camera crew about the day's events. Again as with The Office, the new series would be scripted but improvisation would be encouraged among the actors. Schur said the writers considered an idea in which a broken copy machine from the Scranton setting of The Office ended up in the government offices of Parks and Recreation, thus jokingly making the copy machine the spun-off character from The Office, but the idea was ultimately abandoned. Indiana was identified as a setting for the show because, Daniels said, "it's a Midwestern state that people don’t hear about much (and) didn't have a lot of stereotypes attached to it".

The series was scheduled as a mid-season replacement and rushed into production to meet the premiere date of April 9, 2009. As a result, when the series was featured at a panel during the January 2009 television critics press tour, NBC did not have a finished episode to screen, only a copy of the pilot script available for review. Some of the parts were still not cast and the series, which did not yet have a name, was referred to as The Untitled Amy Poehler Project or TUAPP. The name Public Service was considered, but ultimately rejected because network officials did not want to be accused of mocking the idea. In a commercial that aired during NBC's Super Bowl coverage in February, it was announced that the series would be called Parks and Recreation.

=== Writing ===
The show's writers spent time researching local California politics and attending Los Angeles City Council meetings. Schur said they observed that many community hearings were attended only by those opposed, often angrily, to the proposals under consideration. This confirmed his existing impression: "I've been to some community meetings in my life, and it is often this feeling of utter sparseness. That nobody cares." The depiction of public hearings in several Parks and Recreation episodes was inspired by this perspective, which was also the basis for the entire "Canvassing" episode. Schur asked urban planners in Claremont, California, whether efforts to turn a construction pit into a park could realistically take several months or longer. They told him that was entirely plausible, and that they had recently broken ground on a park that had been in various planning stages for 18 years. Schur said the pit project was conceived as a device to bring all the characters together, which was partially inspired by the way various characters in The Wire were brought together to work toward a common goal or project. The writers originally envisioned the pit becoming a park only in the series finale, although those plans were later changed and the pit was filled in during the second season.

The Pawnee residents vocally opposed to Leslie's park proposal were based on real-life California residents the show's producers encountered who fought the construction of parks in their hometowns. One such group, the Committee for a Better Park, was actually opposed to parks in general, and the deceptiveness of their name and mission inspired the producers' writing for those characters. The Parks and Recreation staff worked with a number of consultants familiar with local government work, including Scott Albright, a California city planner who provided feedback for the Mark Brendanawicz character. Inspiration for Ron Swanson came from an encounter Schur had in Burbank with an elected official, a Libertarian who favored minimal government and admitted, "I don't really believe in the mission of my job."

Daniels and Schur wrote the script for the pilot episode in mid-2008. The original script portrayed Leslie and Mark as slightly less likable than they appeared in the final draft. For example, in the premiere episode, Mark asks Ron to greenlight the park because he is inspired by Leslie's optimism and wants to help her. In the original script, Mark intervened because he was attracted to Ann and wanted an excuse to keep seeing her. The characters were made more likable in response to feedback the episode received from focus groups and press tour screenings. The first-season episodes were written and developed relatively quickly after each other, and Schur said the staff was treating the entire six-episode season as if it was one television pilot. When the season concluded, the writers had not decided what would happen with the developing romantic plotlines between Leslie and Mark, or Mark and Ann.

Parks and Recreation involves a mixture of written dialogue and comedic improvisation. In one example from the pilot episode, Aziz Ansari's character attempts to flirt with Rashida Jones's when she speaks at a parks and recreation public forum. Ansari continued to improvise long after completing his scripted dialogue. In the season's final episode, "Rock Show", Andy goes through a list of the previous names of his rock band. About half the band names used in the episode came directly from the script, but after actor Chris Pratt made up one on the spot, the directors encouraged him to keep improvising. Pratt said he went through about 200 fake band names during the take.

=== Filming ===
Parks and Recreation faced early production delays because Poehler was pregnant when she signed on; filming had to be postponed until she gave birth. Principal photography began on February 18, 2009. The show was filmed in Southern California, and the construction pit featured throughout the season was dug by the episode's producers at an undeveloped property in Van Nuys, a district of Los Angeles. The producers went door-to-door in the neighborhood, seeking residents' permission for the dig. The pit was guarded 24 hours a day, and paparazzi regularly came to the set to take photos of the actors during filming. The exterior of the Pawnee government building, and several of the hallway scenes, were shot at Pasadena City Hall. The parks and recreation department interiors, as well as the Town Hall courtyard, were filmed on a sound stage. The set's windows were outfitted with water systems to simulate falling rain, and the windowsills included fake pigeons. Scenes set in playgrounds and elsewhere outdoors were filmed on location in Los Angeles, and the public forum scenes in the premiere episode were filmed in one of the city's middle schools.

I love the pace of the show. Since I started doing that single-camera stuff, it takes forever. But [on Parks and Recreation] you guys just light and we go. It's so much fun.

— Beth McCarthy-Miller,
director

Schur said the Parks and Recreation producers approach each episode as if they are filming a real documentary. They typically shoot enough for a 35- or 40-minute episode, then cut it down to 22 minutes, using the best material. Due to the improvisational acting and hand-held camerawork, a great deal of extra footage is shot that must be discarded for the final cut. According to Poehler, "For every show, there could probably be a second show of stuff we've edited out." The original cut of the 22-minute pilot was 48 minutes long. The producers film about nine pages of the script each day, a large amount by U.S. television standards.

Although the series shares a mockumentary style with The Office, Daniels and Schur sought to establish a slightly different tone in the camera work of the pilot episode. The one-on-one interviews, for example, sometimes feature two separate camera angles on the same person; the footage is intercut to create the final version of the scene. This technique was inspired by The Five Obstructions, a 2003 experimental documentary directed by Lars Von Trier and Jørgen Leth, which Daniels watched at the suggestion of actor Paul Schneider. Parks and Recreation also makes frequent use of the jump cut technique. For instance, one scene in the pilot episode repeatedly jump cuts between brief clips in which Leslie seeks permission from Ron to pursue the pit project. Early in the season, editor Dean Holland developed a technique that would be used throughout the series. During a scene in "The Reporter" in which Leslie reacts to quotes read to her by the journalist, Poehler improvised a number of jokes, many of which were ultimately going to be cut from the episode. Holland thought they were all funny, so he created a brief montage intercutting several of the lines. The producers sought to lend authenticity to the fictional Pawnee setting by incorporating real-life Indiana elements. They contacted the Bloomington–based Upland Brewing Company and asked for empty beer bottles and labels to be used as background props.

The six episodes of the first season aired Thursdays at 8:30 p.m. The premiere was shown between two season 5 episodes of The Office: "Dream Team" and "Michael Scott Paper Company". "The Reporter" was originally supposed to be the season's second episode, but the schedule was changed and "Canvassing", originally planned as the third episode, was shown second instead.

== Reception ==
=== Reviews ===
The first season of Parks and Recreation started to receive criticism before the premiere episode aired. According to a March 18, 2009, report that was leaked to television journalist Nikki Finke, focus groups responded poorly to a rough-cut version of the pilot. Many focus group members felt the show was a "carbon copy" of The Office. Some found it predictable, slow-paced and lacking in character development, and felt the beginning of the episode needed to better explain the setting and plot. Some viewers said the show lacked strong male characters, particularly a "datable" lead. On the other hand, viewers said the show's portrayal of government bureaucracy was "very believable" and had the potential to generate amusing situations. While Poehler's character drew mixed comments, the actress herself was "well liked". The early feedback left many critics and industry observers skeptical about the show's chances of success. In response to the leak, Ben Silverman, co-chairman of NBC Entertainment, said the feedback on rough cuts is usually negative, even with ultimately successful shows. Schur said that the pilot had been completely re-edited at least four times since the focus groups described in the report were held.

The first season received generally mixed to negative reviews. Many critics said the series was too similar to The Office and its mock documentary style. (Note: Describing the first season, Denise Martin of the Los Angeles Times wrote, "Many critics said the show was needlessly similar to "The Office" – both in its mock documentary format and naive lead.". Alan Sepinwall of The Star-Ledger said the season was so similar to The Office it could "very easily be sold" as a spin-off, and that "comparisons between the two shows inevitable". Scott Tobias of The A.V. Club said the similarities to The Office were preventing the show from "establishing its own identity while begging comparison to a far superior comedy". USA Today writer Robert Bianco said that Parks and Recreation was an attempt to "replicate that almost-hit [The Office], from the small-is-stupid tone to the mockumentary visuals".) In particular, several commentators said the naive and well-meaning Leslie Knope character too closely resembled The Office protagonist Michael Scott, the well-intentioned but dimwitted manager of a paper company sales office. (Note: Denise Martin of The Los Angeles Times wrote that many critics felt the show was too similar to The Office due to its "naive lead". The Star-Ledger's Alan Sepinwall said the two shows featured "central character[s] ... so similar" that Parks and Recreation "could very easily be sold as" a spin-off. The A.V. Club writer Scott Tobias wrote, "Amy Poehler’s Leslie Knopes is conceived too much like the Michael Scott of petty, inept small-time government", and that Parks and Recreation suffers from the comparison.) Maureen Ryan, television reviewer for the Chicago Tribune, said Parks and Recreation surpassed the Friends spin-off Joey as the "worst example of NBC's tendency to extend its franchises well beyond what is desirable or logical." Daniels said of the comparisons between Leslie Knope and Michael Scott, "My sense is that if we had built 'Parks and Recreation' around a 90-year-old Maasai warrior people would still have said, 'He reminds me of Michael Scott'. There was just no way to escape it." Poehler acknowledged that there was some validity to the comparisons, but felt that the series overcame them with the production of "Rock Show": "I think it was something we had to work through in the beginning, and I’m kind of hoping we’re on the other side of that and people will start to judge the show on its own, for what it is and realize it’s just a completely different world in a similar style."

Salon.com writer Jonah Weiner said of the first season, "Each episode wound up more or less the same way, with the humiliation of Poehler's quixotic, adorably doofy bureaucrat". Some critics said the show's characters and overall tone were too mean-spirited in the early episodes. While reviewers praised various cast members in individual episodes, some said the supporting characters in general needed to be more fully developed and provided with better material. Several wrote that some of the subplots were too predictable and risked becoming stale, such as Leslie's long-standing crush on Mark and the question of whether Andy and Ann would keep dating. Others said Leslie was too unintelligent and ditzy. Schur said that was not the intention of the writers, and the feedback prompted changes to the character in the second season. Years after the first season ended, Schur said he believed much of the early criticism stemmed from the fact that audiences were not yet familiar with the characters, and he believed viewers who revisited the episodes enjoyed them more because they had gotten to know the characters better as the series progressed.

Not all reviews were negative. Several commentators said the show had potential, and pointed out that early episodes of The Office had been flat before the series found its footing. (Note: The Star-Ledger's Alan Sepinwall was critical of the Parks and Recreation premiere but said, "it's not a finished product yet", and pointed out, "Don't forget that the American "Office" pilot was one of the worst episodes that show ever made [and] it wasn't until season two that the writers started to get a handle on how to make Michael simultaneously clueless and likable." Ken Tucker of Entertainment Weekly said Parks and Recreation was "a bit of a letdown" and "doesn't yet have the snap or clear character delineation" of The Office. He continued, "But people forget: The Office seemed a little flat when it premiered in 2005." Brian Howard of The Journal News said, "I still don’t think this show should be airing anywhere on the schedule near The Office because the two are just too alike." However, he added, "Parks and Recreation isn't great – yet. But it’s solid, and I think it has a real chance to be great.") The finale, "Rock Show", received the best reviews of the season. Several commentators declared that Parks and Recreation had finally found the right tone both generally and for the Leslie Knope character in particular. (Note: The Star-Ledger's Alan Sepinwall described "Rock Show" as "by far the strongest episode of that uneven [first season]", and said, "I think they may have found a good tone for both the series as a whole and Leslie in particular." The A.V. Club writer Leonard Pierce wrote, "This show has managed to conquer the first-season learning curve with lightning speed; starting with 'Rock Show' at the end of last season, it got on a roll like poppy seeds." The A.V. Club's Keith Phipps, who had previously been critical of the series, said he was "back on board" after "Rock Show" because, "I felt like this revived the pilot’s feel for small-town life and it made me like Leslie again." The Hollywood Reporter writer Tom Goodman said while the first five episodes of the season had been disappointing, "Rock Show" marked an improvement in which "the characters were more defined, their quirks and rhythms understood".) Several reviewers, even those who did not enjoy the show, applauded Poehler's comedic abilities and said her talent, timing and likability helped elevate the series above some of its flaws. (Note: USA Today writer Robert Bianco said Parks and Recreation was unoriginal and unentertaining, but said Amy Poehler "makes [Leslie Knope] instantly, innocently appealing." Alessandra Stanley of The New York Times said the supporting cast was weak, but praised Poehler, writing, "The pilot episode isn't perfect, but Ms. Poehler very nearly is". Verne Gay of Newsday said Parks and Recreation was a "near knockoff" of The Office, but added, "Nevertheless, Poehler's still got plenty of appeal here. In time, who knows?" Daniel Carlson of The Hollywood Reporter, who felt the season needed some time to mature, wrote that Poehler was its strongest element and that "she proves instantly she's got the comic intelligence to carry a series like this one".) Reviewers also said they particularly liked Aziz Ansari as Tom Haverford, (Note: Jonah Weiner of Slate.com wrote that season 1's "brightest spot was Aziz Ansari as Leslie's subordinate Tom Haverford." The Star-Ledger's Alan Sepinwall wrote, "Aziz Ansari has the funniest role as Tom Haverford, who's cheerfully lazy, corrupt and eager to laugh at Leslie behind her back". Rob Owen of the Pittsburgh Post-Gazette said, "The show's funniest character may be Tom". Brian Howard of The Journal News praised Ansari's work, and said, "The guy just needs solid material and the space to let it rip." Mark Ellis of The Sydney Morning Herald described the show as full of "well-drawn characters ... especially jive-talking Indian-American Tom Haverford".) and Chris Pratt as Andy Dwyer. (Note: Reviewing the episode "Boys' Club", The A.V. Club's Keith Phipps praised the performance of Chris Pratt, who he said provided a considerable number of laughs. Phipps also wrote, "If the show sticks around, [the Andy Dwyer character] definitely deserves an upgrade." IGN writer Matt Fowler said of "Rock Show", "The antics on this episode really belonged to Andy." In an Entertainment Weekly article, writer Jeremy Medina made a personal appeal to Greg Daniels and Michael Schur to retain Pratt, credited throughout the season as a guest star, as a regular cast member for the show's second season. He wrote, "Pratt, and his goofball fratboy-past-his-prime charm, dominated the show’s season finale, delivering some of the best moments ever in the fledgling series.") Some commentators approved of the Pawnee setting as offering a good opportunity to satirize small-town government and politics.

Parks and Recreation went on to run for seven seasons over the span of six years. Looking back after the show's run concluded, most critics agreed that the first season was the worst of the series. (Note: In 2015, Vulture.com staff writer Nate Jones wrote of the first season: "Popular opinion says that these episodes are among the worst the series ever did, with only the season finale, "Rock Show," approaching the comedic highs the show would later reach. ... In some ways, Parks has been dealing with the legacy of its first season for its entire life." Chris Morgan of Paste wrote, "The first season of Parks and Recreation, by popular consensus, was uneven and indicative of a show trying to find its footing." Oliver Lyttelton and Jessica Kiang of IndieWire said, "Parks went from a slow, hiccuppy first season to a consistently excellent run from its second season on." Jared Whitley of Deseret News said, "Parks and Rec's first season feels a lot like a bad copy of its big brother show: Knope's incompetent bungling felt far too much like The Office's Michael Scott, but the show quickly corrected and made her the anti-Michael." Tim Goodman of The Hollywood Reporter wrote, "Frankly, the entire first season wasn't good. Not good at all. Of the six episodes that aired, a generous soul would count the first five as blandly pointless and the sixth as maybe holding a glimmer of a hope, which really offered no hope of the show returning.") In a 2015 recap of the show's best episodes, Oliver Lyttelton and Jessica Kiang of IndieWire wrote, "Famously, Parks & Rec didn’t come flying out of the gate. It began with an uneven, rushed, truncated first season that saw the writers visibly struggling with how to make Leslie Knope work, and finding it tricky to stand apart from The Office." Nate Jones of Vulture.com, revisiting the first season following the series finale, noted the tone of the series was darker and more cynical, and the characters, particularly Leslie Knope, were not yet clearly defined or developed. Jones wrote: "Like a lot of early comedy episodes, the jokes are fine, but the series' worldview is hard to pin down, and, true to myth, the tone never really coalesces until the finale." In a 2015 article for Forbes, Allen St. John suggests the changes made in the second season saved the show: "In season two, the writers turned down the snark and the show immediately improved. Leslie was still overly enthusiastic, but beneath all that energy was a core of competence and good intentions." Ethan Alter, senior writer with Yahoo! Entertainment, suggested the Mark Brendanawicz character was poorly conceived and a major problem for the show during its first season: "From the pilot, it's clear that Schneider is the odd man out in an ensemble that's taking some time to gel anyway." In a 2015 article, Grantland writer Sam Donsky said the first season of Parks and Recreation was his favorite season, though he acknowledged this was a minority opinion. Donsky said he preferred the darker tones, felt the character had more leeway, and preferred the series when it was "not worrying about being likable".

=== Ratings ===
Parks and Recreation's premiere was seen by 6.77 million viewers. Media outlets described this as a solid result, comparable to the average Nielsen ratings for 30 Rock, another Thursday-night show on NBC. However, viewership declined almost every week over the rest of the season, (Note: The Nielsen ratings for the second episode, "Canvassing", dropped to 5.92 million viewers. The subsequent ratings were 5.24 million viewers for "The Reporter", 5.29 million for "Boys' Club", 4.64 million for "The Banquet", and 4.25 million for "Rock Show".) culminating in a season low of 4.25 million viewers for the final episode. The average first season viewership was 5.45 million viewers per episode. (Note: This figure was determined by calculating the average of the number of episodes per season and the total viewership numbers for each episode within that season. These viewership numbers can be found on this page, and all are cited by reliable sources. The calculation came out to 32.11/6 episodes=5.45.) The Office experienced similarly poor ratings during its first season and later became a success. However, the low viewership presented a greater challenge for Parks and Recreation because NBC now trailed CBS, ABC and Fox in the ratings, and the move of comedian Jay Leno from The Tonight Show to a variety show in NBC's 10 p.m. weeknight slot left less room on the network's primetime schedule.

Retta said acting during the first season was stressful because it was unclear how long the show would stay on the air, due to the poor reviews and ratings. Likewise, Chris Pratt said there was a constant feeling among the Parks staff that the show could be canceled at any time: "At the end of season one Parks and Rec, you hug the people really, really fucking tight because you just don't know."

== Home media ==
The first season of Parks and Recreation was released on DVD in the United States on September 8, 2009. The DVD included all six episodes, as well as an "Extended Producer's Cut" of the season finale, "Rock Show". The disc also included cast and crew commentary tracks for each episode, as well as about 30 minutes of deleted scenes.
