= Kevin Collins (American actor) =

American actor

- Collins with director, Jamil Dehlavi, at the 2008 South Asian International Film Festival
- Born: Kevin Michael Collins; March 17, 1972 (age 54); Trenton, New Jersey
- Occupations: Actor, voice actor
- Years active: 2004–present

Kevin Michael Collins (born March 17, 1972, in Trenton, New Jersey) is an American-Irish stage and screen actor of Irish-Italian descent.

Collins is an alumnus of St. Michael's College at the University of Toronto and a graduate of the National Theatre School of Canada and the Ecole de Mime Corporel Dramatique in London. He was a member of the Irish company Blue Raincoat and of the London-based corporeal mime company Theatre de l'Ange Fou.

In theatre he has worked in the West End, with the Peter Hall Company, and off-Broadway, most notably at the Irish Repertory Theatre. On film he has appeared in Everybody's Fine, Baby Mama, Jamil Dehlavi's Infinite Justice and Munich, directed by Steven Spielberg. His television appearances include Unforgettable, Law & Order, All My Children, Gossip Girl, Person of Interest and The Black List.

Collins is also a voiceover artist whose voice is regularly heard in national ad campaigns in the United States, Canada, the UK and Ireland. As a voice actor, his credits include work for RTÉ and BBC radio drama, and documentary narration.

He also acted in Just Cause 3, taking the main role as Rico Rodriguez.

== Filmography ==
=== Film ===
- Baby Mama as Rick
- Infinite Justice as Arnold Silverman
- Munich as American Athlete

=== Television ===
- Guiding Light as Dr. Brandon Cohen

=== Videogame ===
- DC Universe Online - Thomas Wayne
- Just Cause 3 - Rico Rodriguez
- SRS: Street Racing Syndicate -
