= Seven Lucky Gods (film) =

2014 British–Albanian film

- Theatrical film poster
- Directed by: Jamil Dehlavi
- Written by: Jamil Dehlavi; Joseph Miller
- Based on: The Nick of Time by Francis King
- Produced by: Jamil Dehlavi
- Starring: Nik Xhelilaj; Christopher Villiers; Alison Peebles; Kate Maravan; Alexandra Boyd; Vernon Dobtcheff
- Cinematography: Godfrey Kirby
- Edited by: Jamil Dehlavi
- Music by: Geoff Alexander
- Release dates: 4 April 2014 (Phoenix); 10 April 2015 (London)
- Running time: 102 mins.
- Countries: Albania; United Kingdom
- Languages: Albanian; English

Seven Lucky Gods is a 2014 British–Albanian psychological thriller drama film, directed by Jamil Dehlavi, who co-wrote with Joseph Miller, based on the novel The Nick of Time by Francis King. The film stars Nik Xhelilaj, Christopher Villiers, Alison Peebles, Kate Maravan, Alexandra Boyd, and Vernon Dobtcheff. It premiered at the Phoenix Film Festival in 2014, before its 2015 opening at the London Independent Film Festival. It was later released on streaming on 5 October 2016, before its DVD release in Germany on 20 January 2017.

== Synopsis ==
An illegal immigrant from Albania infiltrates the lives of a group of Londoners with devastating consequences.

== Cast ==
- Nik Xhelilaj as Mehmet a.k.a. "Kamal"
- Christopher Villiers as Adrian
- Alison Peebles as Meg
- Kate Maravan as Marilyn
- Alexandra Boyd as Audrey
- Vernon Dobtcheff as Laurence
- Emma Alexander as Carmen
- Shaban Arifi as Alban

== Reception ==
Derek Winnert of DerekWinnert.com gave it 3/5 stars, praising the film, its performances, and director: "Seven Lucky Gods is a quite good, quite compelling mystery, with a nice twisty, vaguely probable story, and a far-fetched ending. Nik Xhelilaj sells it well, and it’s easy to believe in his magnetic but exploitative character. The other actors are good, all credible, with Christopher Villiers persuasive as the smooth rich politician Adrian, just ready to take a fall; and a highly amusing turn by Vernon Dobtcheff as the smug, crusty and randy old father, Lawrence. Jamil Dehlavi handles it all smartly and briskly. There’s never a dull moment, exactly what you need from this kind of thriller." The Practical, Fanciful Pagan lauded the acting and dark elements: "I was particularly moved and impressed by a reaction shot of Kate Maravan's face in one scene. It is rare that I ever see cameras linger for a while on someone's visage while he/she/they slowly express deep emotion...SEVEN LUCKY GODS is brutal in places, at times downright cynical more than I personally am, but thought-provoking."
