= Rock Show (Parks and Recreation) =

- Parks and Recreation episode
- Episode no.: Season 1 Episode 6
- Directed by: Michael Schur
- Written by: Norm Hiscock
- Original air date: May 14, 2009

Guest appearances
- Andrew Burlinson as Wyatt "Burly" Burlinson; Stephanie Erb as Beth; Todd Grinnell as Nate; Jim O'Heir as Jerry Gergich (credit only; scenes deleted); Ron Perkins as George; Chris Pratt as Andy Dwyer; Pamela Reed as Marlene Griggs-Knope; Mark Rivers as Drummer; Cooper Thornton as Dr. Harris; Jama Williamson as Wendy Haverford; Alan Yang as Bassist

Episode chronology
← Previous "The Banquet"	Next → "Pawnee Zoo"
- Parks and Recreation season 1

"Rock Show" is the sixth episode and season finale of the first season of the American comedy television series Parks and Recreation. It originally aired on NBC in the United States on May 14, 2009. It was written by Norm Hiscock and directed by Michael Schur. In the episode, Andy gets the casts removed from his legs, and Ann starts reevaluating their relationship when she learns he kept them on longer than necessary so she would keep pampering him. An intoxicated Mark flirts with Leslie, who feels conflicted about whether she wants to move forward when he is drunk.

The episode generated positive reviews. Several commentators claimed "Rock Show" represented a turning point in the series, in which the show found its own tone and broke away from similarities to The Office. According to Nielsen Media Research, it was watched by 4.25 million viewers in its original airing, the lowest viewership for the season. "Rock Show", along with an "Extended Producer's Cut" of the episode, was included on the Parks and Recreation Season One DVD, which was released in the United States on September 8, 2009.

== Plot ==
The parks and recreation department have cake to celebrate Andy having his leg casts removed, and Ann invites everybody to a local bar to hear Andy's first rock concert since he broke his leg. Leslie is disappointed she cannot go, because her mother has set up a business meeting with a local town manager. Later at the hospital, Ann learns from Dr. Harris that Andy could have had his casts removed two weeks earlier and she realizes that he postponed it because he wanted Ann to keep pampering him. Angry, Ann begins reevaluating her relationship with Andy. Later that evening, Leslie realizes the dinner with 62-year-old George Gernway is actually a blind date set up by her mother. George, who tells the documentary camera crew he is getting "very positive signals", invites himself to go with Leslie to the rock show.

Mark feels lonely because he is the only one at the concert without a date: Tom is with his attractive surgeon wife Wendy Haverford, Ron is dating his ex-wife's sister Beth and April is with, "like the gayest person I've ever met, but I make out with him when I'm drunk sometimes." Noticing Ann is angry with Andy, Mark makes a pass at her, but Ann angrily rejects him. Leslie and George show up and are mocked by Tom. After the concert ends, Andy tries to stay as long as possible to avoid a fight with Ann, but she insists they leave. George goes home because he was falling asleep and Leslie starts to leave, but an intoxicated Mark asks her to stay and have a beer with him.

When Leslie notes to the camera crew that they seem to be getting along just like when they had sex five years earlier, she realizes he was drunk then too. When the bar closes, the two decide to keep drinking alongside the pit outside Ann's house, which Leslie plans to turn into a park. When Leslie asks whether he thinks the park will ever be made, a pragmatic Mark says it will be a difficult process with a lot of red tape, but she remains optimistic. During a fight, Andy admits to Ann that he postponed having the casts removed, but explains it was because, "I really, really like it when you serve me food." Ann throws him out, and Andy sees Mark kiss Leslie. Leslie stops his advances because she does not want to move forward when he is drunk. As Mark starts to leave, he falls into the pit. An amused Andy tells Ann, who rushes out to help him while Andy goes back inside and watches television.

== Production ==
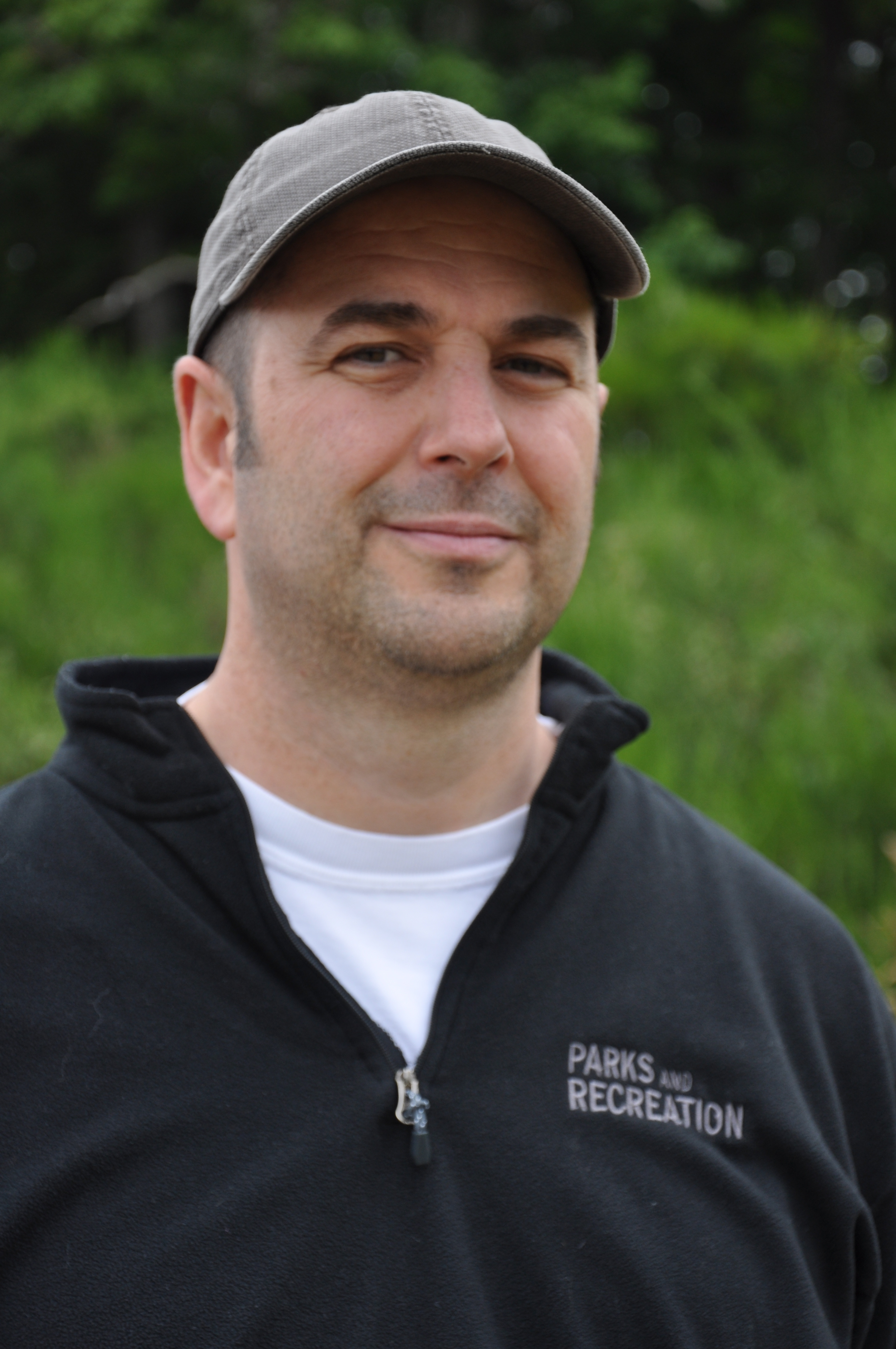
Norm Hiscock wrote the script for "Rock Show", which was widely credited as a turning point for Parks and Recreation.

"Rock Show", the first season finale of Parks and Recreation was written by Norm Hiscock and directed by series co-founder Michael Schur. Schur said he felt "Rock Show" marked a change in tone for the series and struck a better balance between personal and professional stories than any of the other episodes from the season. Schur said: "We treated that whole six-episode season like a pilot. If you go back and watch those episodes now, you can see us making changes. The sixth episode is different in tone than the first. And we made some character tweaks, like every show ever does". Amy Poehler said she believed "Rock Show" would end what she described as the inevitable comparisons between Parks and Recreation and The Office, which is also produced by Parks creators Schur and Greg Daniels. Poehler said, "I think it was something we had to work through in the beginning, and I’m kind of hoping we’re on the other side of that and people will start to judge the show on its own, for what it is and realize it’s just a completely different world in a similar style.” Schur made his directorial debut with "Rock Show", and had only one day of preparation before directing the episode. While preparing to direct the episode, Schur was asked to make an appearance on The Office as Mose Schrute, the cousin of Dwight Schrute and a popular minor character, in the fifth season finale episode, "Company Picnic". Schur regretfully declined because he needed the time to work on "Rock Show", leading Office episode writers Paul Lieberstein and Jennifer Celotta to create the character Rolf, Dwight's friend played by James Urbaniak, as an alternative.

Andy's bandmates during the rock show scene were played by Mark Rivers (drums), Andrew Burlinson (guitar) and Alan Yang (bass). All four actors performed their own instruments live during the filming. Originally, they planned to pre-record the songs and pantomime them for the episode, but after practicing a few times around the extras, they decided to shoot it live. The band performed each song twice, and Schur said he tried to shoot and direct it as if it were a music video. Yang is a writer with Parks and Recreation, and wrote the previous first season episode, "Boys' Club". Rivers is a composer who has worked on the sketch comedy show Human Giant, which starred Parks star Aziz Ansari. Rivers wrote the songs performed in "Rock Show", which Pratt said took him only "about fifteen minutes". Hiscock wrote the lyrics for "The Pit" in the initial outline for the episode and they were handed to Rivers who then fleshed them out. The songs were designed to resemble the music of the American rock band Hootie & the Blowfish. The only song not written by Rivers was "Ann", a romantic ballad Andy played for Ann, which was written by Pratt himself. "Ann" first appeared in "Boys' Club".

Like most episodes of Parks and Recreation, a great deal of the scenes in "Rock Show" were improvised by the actors. Paul Schneider made up his own dialogue during the scene in which he and Poehler sit next to the pit and he talks about it as if it is already a park. Poehler's laughter at his jokes in this scene is her genuine reaction. Pratt also improvised much of his own dialogue, including his rationale to Ann for why he lied about his leg casts: "I really, really like it when you serve me food." Pratt also changed the reaction his character had to Mark falling into the pit. The script originally called for Andy to be serious and concerned, but Pratt changed it so his character thought the fall was funny. Pratt also improvised the songs he sang during an early scene in the episode, in which Andy makes up songs about random items in Ann's living room out of boredom from wearing the casts for so long. One of the songs he sings is about a lamp, and included the lyrics, "I wish you were a lamp that would light up when you get touched." Pratt thought of the song because he had recently gotten such a lamp as a gift from a friend.

During a scene when Andy describes his style of music, April responds that she completely understands him, although the other characters seemingly do not. That line was improvised by Aubrey Plaza, and later helped inspire the writing staff to place the April and Andy characters into a romantic relationship. Schur said of this, "At the time, it was this little nothing, throwaway thing, but when we watched it, we thought there might be something there." The scene with Mark making a pass at Ann at the rock show, and Ann's angry reaction to the attempt, were a last-minute addition to the episode. Although Mark and Ann would develop a romantic relationship in the second season, the Parks and Recreation writers had not decided what would happen between the developing romantic plotlines between Leslie and Mark, or Leslie and Ann, at the time "Rock Show" aired. In the original pilot script, Mark helped Leslie solely because he was attracted to Ann and felt that green-lighting Leslie's project would give him an excuse to spend more time with her; the shooting version was retooled to make Leslie less pathetic and Mark less unlikable, by having him won over by Leslie's determination to fight against the odds. Immediately after "Rock Show" was originally broadcast, NBC set up an official website for "Scarecrow Boat", Andy's band featured in the episode. The site, at scarecrowboat.com, included ringtones, band posters, songs for download and photos.

George Gernway was played by Ron Perkins, the husband of Parks and Recreation casting director Nancy Perkins. Aubrey Plaza conceived the idea of her character dating a gay man who she occasionally makes out with. Her "gay boyfriend" would become a major part of April's character in the second season. The scenes about Mark's efforts to have a speed bump lowered were inspired by Scott Albright, a California city planner who works as a consultant on the show. Albright said it would only be realistic for a city planner to lower a speed bump if a large number of residents complained about it. The hospital scenes in "Rock Show" were filmed on-location in an actual California hospital.

== Cultural references ==
Andy describes the style of his band's music as a mix between Matchbox Twenty and The Fray. George says his favorite rock band is The Everly Brothers, a country-influenced rock band from the 1950s and 60s. Andy finds Ann's lost iPod, a portable music player by Apple Inc., inside his leg cast after it is removed. When Andy starts watching television while Ann rushes off to help Mark at the end of the episode, he is watching the reality series The Real Housewives of Atlanta.

The scene between Mark and Leslie at the pit was mirrored in the second season finale "Freddy Spaghetti", which aired in May 2010 and was Mark's final appearance as a regular cast member. During that scene, the two overlook what was once the pit, but was now a filled-in lot, and Mark gives her construction plans for a park before kissing her goodbye on the cheek and leaving. Schur said of the scene, "It's great because Leslie and Mark, it was such a disastrous moment last time (at the pit) and he didn't really respect her, and a lot's happened in a year." Goor said of using that setting, "I liked the symmetry of having it play a critical, and opposite role in this finale. Last year, they sat on the bench and kissed, and it seemed like they might be getting back together. This year, they sat on the bench and Mark kissed Leslie goodbye."

During one scene, Andy goes through a list of previous names his band has had. Pratt said about half the band names featured in the episode came directly from the script, but after he made up one on the spot, the directors encouraged him to keep improvising. Pratt said he went through about 200 fake band names during the take. The various names of Andy's rock band include:

- A.D. and the D Bags
- The Andy Andy Andies
- Andy Dwyer Experience
- Angelsnack
- Crackfinger
- Death of a Scam Artist
- Department of Homeland Obscurity
- Everything Rhymes with Orange
- Fiveskin
- Flames For Flames
- Fleetwood Mac Sexpants
- Fourskin
- God Hates Figs
- Handrail Suicide
- Jet Black Pope
- Just The Tip
- Malice In Chains
- Mouse Rat
- Muscle Confusion
- Ninjadick
- Nothing Rhymes with Blorange
- Nothing Rhymes with Orange
- Penis Pendulum
- Possum Pendulum
- Punch Face Champions
- Puppy Pendulum
- Rad Wagon
- Razordick
- Teddy Bear Suicide
- Threeskin
- Two Doors Down
- Scarecrow Boat

== Reception ==
In its original American broadcast on May 14, 2009, "Rock Show" was watched by 4.25 million viewers, according to Nielsen Media Research, marking the lowest viewership for the season. Although the rating was almost the same as the previous week's episode, "The Banquet", Bill Gorman of TV By the Numbers still called the rating "pitiful." The episode received a 1.9 rating/7 share among viewers aged between 18 and 34, and a 2.0 rating/6 share among viewers between 18 and 49.

I'm not saying "Rock Show" was a masterpiece, or the series' Rosetta Stone, but at the very least it's a signpost on the way to it becoming the kind of comedy I believe it can be with the talent in front of and behind the camera.

— Alan Sepinwall,
The Star-Ledger

"Rock Show" received generally positive reviews, with many critics claiming it to be the best episode of the series up to that point. The scene in which Leslie rejects Mark's kiss in the pit was considered by some reviewers to be a critical turning point both for the show and for the development of Leslie Knope's character. Kona Gallagher of TV Squad wrote in a 2010 article, "Leslie finally realized that she can move on from Mark and the show realized that it could actually make her a real character".

Alan Sepinwall of The Star-Ledger said after six episodes, he felt "Rock Show" was the episode where the Parks and Recreation found the right tone for the series and Leslie Knope character. Sepinwall said all the characters were very likable, the jokes seemed natural and the awkwardness of the show was turned down enough to work properly. The Hollywood Reporter writer Tim Goodman said while the first five episodes of the season had been disappointing, "Rock Show" marked an improvement in which "the characters were more defined, their quirks and rhythms understood". Matt Fowler of IGN said he did not find the episode especially funny but that it did a good job of fleshing out the characters. He said Chris Pratt was especially funny, and that his band's song "The Pit" was stuck in his head after the episode. The A.V. Club writer Keith Phipps, who had mixed feelings about Parks and Recreation throughout the season, said "Rock Show" was very funny and restored his faith in the potential of the series. Phipps said he believed the show would become very popular in the second season, and that people would later claim to like the first season more than they did the first time they saw it. In October 2009, while reviewing the second season episode "Sister City", A.V. Club writer Leonard Pierce said he believed Parks and Recreation showed a streak of vast improvement that started with "Rock Show" and continued into the second season.

Jeremy Medina of Entertainment Weekly said the episode was "solid all-around" and especially liked Leslie's blind date with the elderly man and Chris Pratt, especially his listing of all his previous band names. Medina said, "Parks and Recreation is only six episodes in, and it's already better than I anticipated. It has its own tone, a talented cast, and a plot that's advancing toward something, at least as fast as governmental red tape will allow it to." Richard Lawson of Gawker said the episode was the best of the season and that he liked the wistful pacing and Poehler's performance. Lawson said, "Anyone who dismissed this show after its first sorta underwhelming episode made a mistake. The show has only gotten tighter and sharper, culminating in last night's funny/sad finale." Time television reviewer James Poniewozik said the episode was the best yet for developing Poehler into a "more multi-facted, less risible character". He also said the supporting staff played "flawlessly" off each other in the rock show scene, and thinks there is "huge potential" in the dynamic between Leslie and her undermining mother. Not all reviews of the episode were positive. Maureen Ryan of the Chicago Tribune said the Leslie Knope character was unappealing in "Rock Show" and throughout the first season, which she said surpassed the Friends spin-off Joey as "the worst example of NBC's tendency to extend its franchises well beyond what is desirable or logical."

== Home media ==
"Rock Show", along with the five other first season episodes of Parks and Recreation, was released on a one-disc DVD set in the United States on September 8, 2009. The DVD included cast and crew commentary tracks for each episode, as well as about 30 minutes of deleted scenes. The disc also included an "Producer's Extended Cut" of "Rock Show", which incorporated scenes that were cut from the originally broadcast episode. Many of the deleted scenes were improvised dialogue from the actors in brief extensions of episodes already included in the originally broadcast episode. In one of the cut scenes, Marlene Knope tells the audience that Leslie's business meeting is actually a date. The producers decided to cut the moment, so the audience would find out at the same time Leslie learns it. In another cut scene, Andy tries to convince Ann that the doctor lied to her about Andy requesting more time with the leg casts because the doctor wanted more money. One of the longest cut scenes from the extended edition was a conversation between Leslie and Mark at the bar, in which Mark explains his ideals about city planning when he attended college are much different than the practical, technical aspects of his job. Although the scene was cut, Michael Schur said the monologue did a great deal to help develop Mark's character.
