= Boys' Club (Parks and Recreation) =

- Parks and Recreation episode
- Episode no.: Season 1 Episode 4
- Directed by: Michael McCullers
- Written by: Alan Yang
- Original air date: April 30, 2009

Guest appearances
- Eric Edelstein as Lawrence; Todd Grinnell as Nate; Windell Middlebrooks as Brian; Jim O'Heir as Jerry Gergich; Chris Pratt as Andy Dwyer; Retta as Donna Meagle; Stewart Skelton as Phil; J.W. Wolterman as Steve; Fiona Caldwell as little girl

Episode chronology
← Previous "The Reporter"	Next → "The Banquet"
- Parks and Recreation season 1

"Boys' Club" is the fourth episode of the first season of the American comedy television series Parks and Recreation. It originally aired on NBC in the United States on April 30, 2009. It was written by Alan Yang and directed by Michael McCullers. In the episode, Leslie tries to integrate herself into the local "boys club" by drinking wine from an illegal gift basket, and gets into trouble as she tries to accept responsibility for her supposed mistake. In a B story, Andy cleans Ann's house while she is at work.

The episode included beer and props from Upland Brewing Company, a real-life company based in Bloomington, Indiana, in an attempt to give Pawnee an authentic Indiana atmosphere. "Boys' Club" received positive to fair reviews, with some commentators praising the episode for better developing the show's supporting characters.

According to Nielsen Media Research, it was watched by 5.28 million households in its original airing, which was consistent with the previous week. "Boys' Club" and the rest of the first season of Parks and Recreation was released on DVD in the United States on September 8, 2009.

== Plot ==
The episode opens with Leslie and Tom responding to an incident at a park trail, where teenage boys are picking up plastic baggies of dog droppings and throwing them at each other. Leslie tries to stop them but ends up playing along with the boys and admitting that it is fun. Later, at the Pawnee town hall, a construction company has sent a gift basket with wine and cheese to the parks department, but Leslie locks it away because they are not allowed to accept gifts over $25. Later, she and the others in the department look at a new social-networking site that April has set up for the pit construction project. The site already has seven friends, including city planner Mark, who Leslie is disappointed to see is friends with many scantily clad young women. Leslie and Ann see Mark and other city planners drinking beer in the town hall courtyard. Leslie describes it as the exclusive "boys' club" and proposes that she and Ann crash it.

When they come outside, Mark and the others welcome them warmly. Leslie enjoys herself at the party and, when the beer runs out and the party is about to end, she keeps it going by retrieving the wine and cheese from the gift basket. The next morning, she feels guilty and, despite her boss Ron's assurance that "[i]t's not that big a deal," Leslie issues a public apology to every government official in Pawnee, including a link to the new pit website. Later, however, she learns April has placed a drunken video of herself drinking the rest of the wine on the site, even though she is only 19. Ron tells Leslie an ethics board has called for a disciplinary hearing with Leslie. Leslie apologizes to the board and defends April, accepting responsibility for the video. As the questions from the board continue, Ron angrily defends Leslie, insisting, "Leslie has never broken a rule in her life, to the point that it's annoying." He abruptly ends the meeting and insists they will have to go through him to give Leslie anything more than a slap on the wrist.

Later, Leslie learns she will receive a letter in her file, which disappoints her strongly until Mark tells her he has seven in his file, and that most of the guys have at least one. Mark welcomes Leslie "to the team", which makes her proud.

In a B story, Ann's normally lazy boyfriend Andy decides to surprise her by cleaning up their messy house while she is gone. He cleans up the house (although he throws their garbage into the pit). After cleaning it, he bathes himself in a children's pool in the backyard and plays music on his boombox. Angry neighbor Lawrence steals his boombox, prompting Andy (who has two broken legs) to chase the neighbor naked through the streets on his crutches. Later, Ann arrives home and is pleased with Andy's housework, with Andy telling the documentary crew he expects to get "gently laid" later.

== Production ==
"Boys' Club" was written by Alan Yang and directed by Michael McCullers. McCullers co-wrote two of the Austin Powers films and directed Poehler in the comedy film Baby Mama. The cold open scene, with kids throwing bags of dog feces at Leslie, was added to the episode after the rest had already been filmed, and was directed personally by series co-creator Greg Daniels. The bags were actually filled with mashed potatoes. Daniels said of the opening, "There were a lot of people who felt this was not in good taste, but to me, this was one of the most fun things about the show." On the episode commentary track, only Daniels discusses the scene—and he absolves episode writer Yang of any responsibility for the finished cold open.

The restriction prohibiting Pawnee employees from accepting gifts over $25 was based on real-life municipal regulations the Parks and Recreation producers encountered during their research. The scenes filmed in the town hall outside courtyard were filmed on a studio sound stage, and the ethics board review scene was filmed inside the city hall building of Pasadena, California.

Like most episodes of Parks and Recreation, a great deal of the scenes in "Boys' Club" were improvised by the actors. For example, Nick Offerman improvised the line "Put it in an e-mail?", which he said when Leslie told him she had a very long story to tell him. Schur thought the line was "my favorite thing in the show", and they made him say in it every subsequent take during filming. Aziz Ansari also improvised a majority of the scene in which he helped Leslie prepare for her ethics board review. Dean Holland, Parks and Recreation's editor, said it was his favorite scene from the entire first season. Amy Poehler improvised the line at the courtyard gathering, after she accidentally spilled several beer bottles, "I feel like I'm already in the boys' club. Look at those bitches cleanin' up after me." Schur said the line helped develop Leslie's character in future episodes because "we realized that Leslie can be a little bit cooler than we had originally thought". The scene with Ron describing his ideal government was written for a different episode, but was moved to "Boys' Club" when the producers decided it fit better there. Schur said it was his favorite moment in the episode. "Boys' Club" ends with Leslie and Mark toasting a beer to each other because Schur said, "It's a running joke in the writer's room that every episode should end with clinking beers."

Photos of Parks and Recreation producers were included among the photos of past city council members on the town hall walls. The photo of Norm Hiscock is the one Leslie said she believes, "No matter what direction I move, he's always staring at my chest. Mark's social networking site featured in "Boys' Club" included the character with a wide range of promiscuous women. The pictures were shot during a photo session during which, according to series co-creator Michael Schur, "We brought in a lot of women and basically said, you're really trashy. You're trashy women, and we're going to take your picture now." During the courtyard party scenes, a brief clip shows Poehler, Jones and Schneider dancing together. The clip was actually the three actors out-of-character playing around between takes, but the Parks producers decided to add it to the episode.

Michael Schur, co-creator of Parks and Recreation, said "Boys' Club" marked an attempt to better develop Andy Dwyer. Schur said, "We definitely wanted to dimensionalize his character and not make him just a one-dimensional douchebag." In the episode, Andy plays a tape of himself singing a song called "Ann", which he wrote as a romantic ballad for her. Chris Pratt actually wrote and performed the song himself for the show, although he said in an interview, "it really wasn't much". Pratt actually appeared on set naked while filming the scene in which he chases Lawrence through the streets without clothes on. Schur said the scene was written because Pratt "loves taking his clothes off". It proved difficult to film the scenes with Pratt bathing in the children's pool because the bubbles disappeared so quickly that multiple takes were required. The scenes with Andy running naked through the streets with his crutches to get his boombox back were inspired by a real-life experience from the set. During filming, an announcement was made that specialty coffees were available for the cast and crew, and Pratt ran quickly after them with the crutches. Greg Daniels added it to "Boys' Club" because he found the experience extremely funny.

In an attempt to lend authenticity to the fictional Pawnee, Indiana setting, Parks and Recreation producers contacted the Bloomington, Indiana-based Upland Brewing Company and asked them to provide empty beer bottles and labels for the scene with the characters drinking in the town hall courtyard. The company provided props for their beer brand Dragonfly IPA, and Upland officials said their prominent appearances in the episode generated positive publicity for the company: Scott Johnson, marketing operations manager for the brewing company, said, "As soon as it went off, everyone starts calling me and e-mailing me." They also drink Vernors ginger ale, a soft drink very popular in Indiana. Windell Middlebrooks makes a guest appearance as Brian, one of the men attending the courtyard party. Middlebrooks was cast simply based on his work on Miller High Life commercials, in which he steals beer from bars that he deems unworthy of it.

On the day of the episode's original American broadcast on April 30, 2009, the official NBC Parks and Recreation website launched a duplicate of the Sullivan Street Pit social networking site which was featured in the episode, complete with photos of the pit, the list of "friends" from the show and a link to Mark's page and his photos with scantily clad women. The pit page, as well as the regular NBC website, also included the actual video of Aubrey Plaza pretending to drink wine and get drunk, as it was featured in the episode. Schur said for those scenes, "We just gave Aubrey a camera and told her to just drink wine and talk to the camera."

== Cultural references ==
The social networking site developed for the pit project is inspired by sites like MySpace and Facebook, which were extremely popular when the episode was first broadcast. Leslie makes a public apology to all female government officials in alphabetical order, starting with Minnesota Republican Rep. Michele Bachmann, Wisconsin Democratic Rep. Tammy Baldwin and Illinois Democratic Rep. Melissa Bean. On her desk, Leslie has framed photos of U.S. Secretary of State Hillary Clinton and former Supreme Court Justice Sandra Day O'Connor. The apology scene was filmed with the camera on a tripod, something seldom done in the documentary-style series. In one scene, Andy is seen playing Mario Kart Wii with the Wii wheel accessory. An online game of Scrabble is visible on the computer screen in Ron's office during one scene. It is exactly the same Scrabble game he had been playing with Tom in the previous episode, "The Reporter". While preparing Leslie for her ethics board review, Tom asks if she has ever fantasized about Ron "covered in Powerade". This is a reference to commercials for the sports drink, in which athletes sweat the multi-colored liquid while working out.

== Reception ==
In its original American broadcast on April 30, 2009, "Boys' Club" was watched by 5.28 million households, according to Nielsen Media Research. This rating was consistent with the previous week even as other NBC shows, like the new Southland, saw a drop in ratings. "Boys' Club" received a 2.3 rating/8 share among viewers aged between 18 and 34, and a 2.3 rating/7 share among viewers between 18 and 49.

The episode received positive to fair reviews. Alan Sepinwall, television journalist for The Star-Ledger, said "Boys' Club" was funnier than the previous episode and included scenes with good physical comedy involving Leslie, particularly when she spilled the beer bottles; he also praised Andy's "naked crutch chase". Matt Fowler of IGN said the episode gave a little more insight into Leslie's "aspirations about wanting to be a woman who succeeds in government, which is a step in the right direction", but Fowler said her constant mistakes and wrong decisions bog down the story. Fowler said the best part of the episode was Andy's subplot, particularly the scene in which he hops down the street naked on his crutches. Keith Phipps of The A.V. Club gave the episode a B− grade, and said the Amy Poehler character needs to be more fully formed in future episodes. Phipps said most of the show's laughs came from supporting characters Andy, Tom and Ron; he also particularly praised Ron's shutdown of Leslie's hearing and his monologues of the ideal government: "One guy, who sits in a small room at a desk. And the only thing he’s allowed to decide is who to nuke." Jeremy Medina of Entertainment Weekly liked that the episode included a moral crisis of sorts for Leslie, who he described as "a fully-realized character instead of a caricature".

== Home media ==
"Boys' Club", along with the five other first season episodes of Parks and Recreation, was released on a one-disc DVD set in the United States on September 8, 2009. The DVD included cast and crew commentary tracks for each episode, as well as about 30 minutes of deleted scenes. The deleted scenes included on the DVD were originally featured on the official Parks and Recreation website after the episode aired. In one of the scenes, Leslie bought a gift basket and returned it to the business that provided the original one, in an attempt at what she called "ethical restitution". In another scene, Leslie apologized to April for introducing her to alcohol, prompting April to later tell the camera she has had fake IDs in Indiana, North Dakota and Delaware since she was 14 years old.
