= Jamil Dehlavi =

British film director and producer (born 1944)

- Born: 1944 (age 81–82); Calcutta, British India
- Education: University of Oxford (BA); Columbia University (MFA)
- Occupations: Film director and producer
- Notable work: The Blood of Hussain (1980); Born of Fire (1987) Immaculate Conception (1992); Jinnah (1998); Infinite Justice (2006); Godforsaken (2010)
- Website: www.dehlavifilms.com

Jamil Dehlavi (Urdu: جمیل دہلوی) (born 1944) is a London-based independent film director and producer of Pakistani-French origin.

Since he became a filmmaker in the 1970s, his work has been widely screened internationally, notable films including Jinnah (1998), about the partition of India and the birth of Pakistan, which won the Grand Prize at the Festival of the Dhow Countries, Best International Film at the World Film Awards in Indonesia, the Gold Award at Worldfest Flagstaff, Best Foreign Film at Worldfest Houston, and was nominated for a Golden Pyramid at the Cairo International Film Festival.

== Early life and education ==
Born in Calcutta, West Bengal, to a French mother and a Muslim father who was living in Bombay that worked as a diplomat, who subsequently travelled extensively between Asia and Europe, Dehlavi is fluent in five languages (English, French, Italian, Spanish and Urdu). He studied at Karachi Grammar School, then at international schools in Paris and Rome, before going to Rugby School and Oxford University. He graduated with a BA degree in Politics and French Literature and an MA (Hons) in Jurisprudence. He was subsequently called to the Bar at Lincoln's Inn but never practised, preferring instead to go into the world of cinema. Dehlavi studied film directing at Columbia University in New York, where he was awarded an MFA degree.

== Career ==
While studying in New York, Dehlavi trained as an actor with Stella Adler and made his first feature film, Towers of Silence, which he wrote, produced and directed. It won the Grand Prize at the Festival of the Americas. His next film, The Blood of Hussain (1980), was selected by the Director's Fortnight at the Cannes Film Festival and won the Grand Prize at the Taormina Film Festival. All of his subsequent films have also won major awards at film festivals all over the world.

Dehlavi has worked on various projects for the BBC, Channel Four, and French television, including Qâf – The Sacred Mountain, which won awards at five environmental film festivals. He worked on Passover, a passion play shot in Córdoba and made in collaboration with the celebrated flamenco guitarist Paco Peña. Dehlavi has also worked in the Radio & Visual Services Division at the United Nations and as an associate professor in the School of Arts, Humanities & Social Sciences at Habib University in Karachi.

In August 2018, the BFI Southbank presented a retrospective of his work entitled Between the Sacred and the Profane: The Cinema of Jamil Dehlavi, which was described as "a rare opportunity to examine the contribution of one of the most intriguing and least understood figures of cinema." With screenings of several films held over the weekend of 10–12 August, the event also featured a conversation with Dehlavi.

== Awards and filmography ==
- 1973: The Guitarist (starring Jamil Dehlavi & Ellen Pauwels)

Gold Medal – Atlanta Film Festival

- 1976: Towers of Silence (starring Judy Van Hook & Jamil Dehlavi)

Grand Prize - Festival of the Americas

- 1980: The Blood of Hussain (starring Salman Peerzada, Kika Markham, Durriya Kazi & Jamil Dehlavi)

Director's Fortnight - Cannes Film Festival
Grand Prize – Taormina Film Festival
Gold Award – Worldfest Houston
Gold Hugo Nomination Best Feature Film – Chicago International Film Festival

- 1984: Qâf – The Sacred Mountain (short documentary film, also known as Qâf)

Best Environmental Film – Jackson Hole Mountain Film Festival
Special Jury Award – Telluride Mountain Film Festival
Silver Gentian Best Mountain Film – Trento Mountain Film Festival
Diable d'Or – Les Diablerets, Switzerland
Best Environmental Documentary – Worldfest Houston

- 1986: Born of Fire (starring Peter Firth & Suzan Crowley)

Official Selection – Avoriaz Film Festival
Catalan Award – Imagfic Madrid
Gold Award Best Feature Film – Worldfest Houston
Gold Hugo Nomination Best Feature Film – Chicago International Film Festival

- 1992: Immaculate Conception (starring Melissa Leo, James Wilby, Shabana Azmi & Zia Mohyeddin)

Panorama – Berlin International Film Festival
Special Jury Prize – Dinard Film Festival
Gold Hugo Nomination Best Feature Film – Chicago International Film Festival

- 1996: Passover (short film starring Jorge de Juan & Belen Fernandez)
- 1997: Passion in the Desert [Producer] (starring Ben Daniels & Michel Piccoli)
- 1998: Jinnah (starring Christopher Lee, James Fox, Maria Aitken & Shashi Kapoor)

Grand Prize – Zanzibar International Film Festival
Best International Film – World Film Awards, Indonesia
Gold Award Best Foreign Film – Worldfest Flagstaff
Silver Award – Worldfest Houston
Golden Pyramid Nomination – Cairo International Film Festival

- 2006: Infinite Justice (starring Kevin Collins & Raza Jaffrey)

FIPRESCI International Critics Prize
Best European Feature Film – European Independent Film Festival, Paris
Robert Rodriguez Prize for Excellence – Hollywood DV Festival
Critic's Prize – Amiens International Film Festival
Audience Award Best Film – Florence River to River Festival
Special Jury Award – Worldfest Houston
Best Supporting Actor: Raza Jaffrey - Karafilm Festival, Karachi

- 2010: Godforsaken (starring Annabel Wright, Trevor White & Nick Ashdon)

Golden Palm Award – Mexico International Film Festival
Special Jury Remi and Best International Film Award – Worldfest Houston
Best Actress Nomination: Annabel Wright – Milan International Film Festival, Italy
Best European Feature Nomination - European Independent Film Festival, France
Best Film Nomination – Beverly Hills Hi-Def Film Festival
Best Digital Film Nomination – Cairo International Film Festival, Egypt
Best Film Nomination – Portobello International Film Festival, London

- 2014: Seven Lucky Gods

Grand Prize, Tirana International Film Festival
Best Feature Film – Canada International Film Festival
Gold Lion Award – Barcelona International Film Festival
Best Feature Film – Honolulu Film Awards, Hawaii
Best Feature Film – Delhi International Film Festival
Special Jury Prize – Worldfest Houston
Best Actor (Nik Xhelilaj) – Worldfest Houston
Best Actress Nomination (Alison Peebles) – Worldfest Houston
Best Original Screenplay – St. Tropez International Film Festival
Best Lead Actress (Alison Peebles) – St. Tropez International Film Festival
Bronze Palm Award – Mexico International Film Festival
Best Foreign Film Nomination – Phoenix Film Festival
Best Production Design Nomination (Jamil Dehlavi) – Milan Film Festival
Best Supporting Actress Nomination (Kate Maravan) – Milan Film Festival
Best Supporting Actor Nomination (Christopher Villiers) – Madrid International Film Festival

- 2016: Blood Money (short film)

Short Film Corner – Cannes Film Festival
Best Picture – West Coast International Film Festival, USA
Honorable Mention Award – Berlin International Film Awards
Finalist – Polish International Film Festival
