= The Banquet (Parks and Recreation) =

- Parks and Recreation episode
- Episode no.: Season 1 Episode 5
- Directed by: Beth McCarthy-Miller
- Written by: Tucker Cawley
- Original air date: May 7, 2009

Guest appearances
- Loretta Fox as Jeanine Restrepo; Bruce Jarchow as Frank Schnable; Jim Meskimen as Martin Housely; Jim O'Heir as Jerry Gergich; Chris Pratt as Andy Dwyer; Pamela Reed as Marlene Griggs-Knope; Retta as Donna Meagle (deleted scenes only); Cletus Young as Salvatore

Episode chronology
← Previous "Boys' Club"	Next → "Rock Show"
- Parks and Recreation season 1

"The Banquet" is the fifth and penultimate episode of the first season of the American comedy television series Parks and Recreation. It originally aired on NBC in the United States on May 7, 2009. It was written by Tucker Cawley and directed by Beth McCarthy-Miller. In the episode, Leslie attends an award banquet for her mother, a veteran of local government politics, who encourages Leslie to resort to blackmail in order to get her way with a zoning board official.

The episode received positive reviews, with Entertainment Weekly claiming the series appears to have grown more "settled and focused" after this episode. According to Nielsen Media Research, it was watched by 4.64 million households in its original airing, continuing a downward trend in ratings since the pilot episode, although NBC had already committed to renewing the show for a second season. "The Banquet" and the rest of the first season of Parks and Recreation was released on DVD in the United States on September 8, 2009.

== Plot ==
Leslie is proud that her mother, school system employee Marlene Knope, is to receive a public service award during an upcoming banquet. Ann, excited to go to a social event after spending so much time taking care of her injured, freeloading boyfriend Andy, is told by Leslie to dress very formally. Leslie visits an old-fashioned barber, who unbeknownst to her only gives men's haircuts; she is given a very short, mannish hairstyle, which she is very proud of. Leslie and Ann, who is extremely overdressed in an expensive pink dress, arrive together at the banquet, where they are mistaken for a lesbian couple by many of the attendees. Tom sucks up to Marlene during his banquet speech, while Ron sticks to a "fact-based" speech ("It is true that you have won this award.")

Leslie sees Jeanine Restrepo, an influential zoning board member who could help Leslie with her plans to turn the Sullivan Street pit into a park. Leslie is too nervous to approach her, so she practices with Mark, who teasingly pinches her nose because he says as Jeanine, "I can do whatever I want"; Ann pinches Mark's nose and Leslie pinches Ann's, and Mark summarizes, "It's fun to pretend to be zoning board members." Marlene suggests Leslie try sucking up to Jeanine in her speech, but it comes across awkwardly when Leslie claims to "love" Jeanine. When Leslie tries to approach her later, Jeanine suggests Leslie make an appointment with her secretary. Marlene says this means Jeanine is blowing them off, and tells Leslie to blackmail Jeanine with the knowledge that her husband has a DUI offense in Illinois. Leslie shares the advice with Ann, who says she believes it is unethical and wrong; offended, Leslie accuses Ann of pampering Andy. ("He's got three crutches, and one of them is you. And the other two are crutches.") Ann storms off.

Tom wants to go bar-hopping with Mark, who leaves even though he is enjoying hanging out with Leslie and Ann. Tom wears a goofy orange hat at the bar, which he calls "peacocking", or standing out in a public setting like a peacock. The two talk to women at the bar, but Mark finds them boring and he leaves Tom alone. Ron enjoys the banquet's bacon-wrapped shrimp, "my number one favorite food, wrapped around my number three favorite food". Leslie confronts Jeanine about her husband's DUI, but when Jeanine grows angry, Leslie is unable to go through with the blackmail; Jeanine splashes water in Leslie's face, and she leaves ashamed. Leslie visits Ann and apologizes, and Ann acknowledges Leslie was partially right about Andy. The two hug and Andy gets angry because he thought Leslie was "a dude" due to her haircut. Mark comes back to the banquet hall to find Ann and Leslie, but is disappointed to see the banquet is over.

== Production ==
"The Banquet" was written by Tucker Cawley and directed by Beth McCarthy-Miller, a long-time television director who worked with Poehler on the sketch comedy show Saturday Night Live. The "Modern Barber Shop" featured in the episode is an actual barber shop in Burbank, California. The interior is very similar to the inside of the actual barber shop. Every time McCarthy-Miller visited the real Modern Barber Shop, the barber's wife was always eating sunflower seeds next to the shop door. As a result, McCarthy-Miller added an elderly woman with sunflower seeds into the episode's barber scenes.

The "peacocking" element was not included into the script, but added to the episode during filming after actor Aziz Ansari mentioned to show co-creator Greg Daniels that he believed the character would be interested in pickup artist tactics like those outlined in Neil Strauss' book The Game: Penetrating the Secret Society of Pickup Artists. Ansari and Daniels asked the wardrobe for something silly for Ansari to wear in the bar, and they tried about a half-dozen items before Ansari himself settled on the orange hat, which is actually a woman's hat. The two women Mark and Tom talk to at the bar were meant to mirror Leslie and Ann from the banquet. Although they do not resemble Poehler and Jones, the two women had the same color hair (brown and blond) and were seated at the table in the same spots in relation to Mark that Leslie and Ann were seated around him at the banquet.

The scene in which water is splashed in Leslie's face was only shot twice, because McCarthy-Miller said Poehler would start anticipating it in more takes and it would not have appeared spontaneous. The first time the scene was acted, the cameras were accidentally not turned on, so only one take was usable for the episode. During the banquet for the Tellenson Awards, a video is shown of an ill Tony Tellenson (for whom the award was named) in his hospital room. McCarthy-Miller shot the scene with minimal staff on a separate set. Multiple takes were filmed, and the severity of illness differed in each one. The final clip used in the episode shows Tellenson wearing a mask attached to an oxygen tank, which is one of the healthiest versions they filmed. The Jeanine Restrepo character was originally named Janet Restrepo, but was changed at the last moment. Poehler and the rest of the cast had already memorized the lines with the name Janet, and the actors had difficulty filming the scenes correctly as a result.

== Cultural references ==
In an opening statement about the history of Pawnee, Indiana, Leslie says a pilgrim traded a baby to the Native Americans in exchange "for what is now Indianapolis", the state capital. She said the pilgrim's face was made into a dreamcatcher, a handmade Native American object with a willow hoop and loose web. The barber who gave Leslie her haircut also previously cut the hair of former-U.S. Vice President Dan Quayle. Ron said he likes shrimp hors d'œuvres wrapped in bacon so much, he would attend an event honoring pirates in Somalia to get them.

== Reception ==
In its original American broadcast on May 7, 2009, "The Banquet" was watched by 4.64 million households, according to Nielsen Media Research, continuing a downward trend in ratings since the pilot episode, although NBC had already committed to renewing the show for a second season. The episode received a 2.3 rating/8 share among viewers aged between 18 and 34, and a 2.0 rating/6 share among viewers between 18 and 49. The poor rating for Parks and Recreation and Southland, another then-new NBC series, contributed in bringing the network down to fourth place in the ratings for the evening, behind CBS, ABC and Fox. "The Banquet", however, received generally positive reviews. Most reviewers particularly praised the opening scene with Leslie describing the murder of Pawnee pilgrim Nathanliel Bixby Mark at the hands of Native Americans, who used his body parts for various purposes because, "They used every part of the pioneer".

Jeremy Medina of Entertainment Weekly said he believed although the show initially needed improvement, that it had arrived at a "settled and focused" series with "The Banquet". He praised the episode as a whole, as well as individual small moments, like Leslie's haircut, April calling her "sir", Ron's affinity for bacon-wrapped shrimp, Tom's coining of the phrase "peacockin" to mean standing out in bars. Alan Sepinwall of The Star-Ledger said "The Banquet" was funnier than other recent Parks and Recreation episodes, although he said the Leslie character continues to too closely resemble a female Michael Scott, the protagonist of The Office. Sepinwall said of the show, "I know a lot of people have already given up, but I really feel like the show is a summer's worth of tweaking away from being good. It's not there yet, but I see glimmers."

Matt Fowler of IGN said the episode "was able to rise a few notches above the last one" and that he enjoyed Leslie's antics and many of Tom's antics, including his suggestions for Leslie's introduction for her mom. He also liked the scene in which Mark pinched Leslie's nose, which he described as "a nice, playful scene that brought some much needed humanity to her cartoonish character". Jason Hughes of TV Squad praised the episode, particularly the characters Tom and Ann. He said of the episode, "The little things like (Leslie's haircut and Ann overdressing) are what's making this show work a little more with each episode. Finding humor in the small things of small government." Brian Howard of The Journal News said the series is not great yet, but that "The Banquet" included glimpses of possible greatness in the future, particularly in the performances by Poehler, Jones, Ansari and Schneider. Keith Phipps of The A.V. Club said the laughs in the episode, particularly involving Leslie's haircut and her perceived romantic relationship with Ann, were "a bit thin". Phipps also said he found himself disliking Leslie, of whom he said, "Here she seems more stupid than pleasantly naïve."

== Home media ==
"The Banquet", along with the five other first season episodes of Parks and Recreation, was released on a one-disc DVD set in the United States on September 8, 2009. The DVD included cast and crew commentary tracks for each episode, as well as about 30 minutes of deleted scenes. The deleted scenes included on the DVD were originally featured on the official Parks and Recreation website after the episode aired.

In the first, an 80-second clip, Leslie gives everyone in the department tickets to the banquet. She tries to invite Andy, and when Ann says he cannot put on pants due to his cast, Leslie asks, "Does he have a formal kilt or something?" The second clip features 100 seconds of extended banquet sequences, including Ann's reaction to Leslie's haircut, Ann's awkward attempts to make small talk with April and more of Tom's speech to Marlene. In the third, a 30-second clip, set at the bar, Tom describes to Mark his strategy in picking up a girl: he asked her what she did for a living, then, "I just yawned, gave her the middle finger and left. Pretty risky but I feel good about it." In the final clip, which was 15 seconds long, an amused Tom shows a newspaper photo caption of Leslie and Ann from the banquet, with the caption, "Mr. Leslie Knope and wife Ann."
