= Immaculate Conception (film) =

- Directed by: Jamil Dehlavi
- Written by: Jamil Dehlavi
- Produced by: Jamil Dehlavi
- Starring: James Wilby; Melissa Leo; Shabana Azmi
- Cinematography: Nicholas D. Knowland
- Edited by: Chris Barnes
- Music by: Richard Harvey
- Release date: 11 September 1992
- Running time: 120 min
- Country: United Kingdom
- Language: English

Immaculate Conception is a 1992 film written and directed by British director Jamil Dehlavi with James Wilby, Melissa Leo and Shabana Azmi playing the lead roles.

The film won the Special Jury prize at the Festival of British Cinema, Dinard.

== Plot ==
Hannah, Jewish-American daughter of a US senator, and her British lover Alistair, working as an environmentalist in Pakistan, desperate for a child, visit the eunuch shrine of Gulab Shah which has a reputation for curing infertility. While Alistair is embroiled in a brief love affair with a Pakistani photographer, Hannah conceives and decides to convert to Islam, coaxing Alistair to do the same, causing a conflict with her family. Meanwhile, the eunuchs from the shrine develop an interest in Hannah's baby, leading to tension from the clash of cultures and religious beliefs.

== Cast ==
- James Wilby as Alistair
- Melissa Leo as Hannah
- Shabana Azmi as Samira
- Zia Mohyeddin as Shehzada
- James Cossins as Godfrey
- Shreeram Lagoo as Dadaji
- Ronny Jhutti as Kamal
- Tim Choate as David Schwartz
- Bill Bailey as American Consul
- Badi Uzzaman as Dadaji's Retainer

== Critical response ==
Kim Newman reviewing the film in Empire Online wrote, "despite trying to shoehorn oodles of secondary themes into the brew, the psychological tug-of-war between Islam and Judaism, some nasty imperialist behaviour, and the downbeat ending make this well worth a look, if for no other reason than Western audiences rarely get a chance to see anything vaguely Asian."
