= Infinite Justice (film) =

- Theatrical Poster
- Directed by: Jamil Dehlavi
- Written by: Jamil Dehlavi
- Produced by: Jamil Dehlavi
- Starring: Kevin Collins; Raza Jaffrey
- Cinematography: Nicholas D. Knowland; Tony Miller
- Edited by: Angelica Landry
- Music by: Deborah Mollison
- Production company: Dehlavi Films
- Distributed by: Accent Film Entertainment
- Release dates: October 2006 (Dinard Festival); 30 November 2007
- Running time: 95 min
- Country: United Kingdom
- Language: English

Infinite Justice is a 2006 British thriller drama film written and directed by London-based Pakistani director Jamil Dehlavi. It won Best Dramatic Feature at the European Independent Awards in Paris in March 2007, and the Robert Rodriguez Award for Excellence at the 2007 Hollywood Digital Film Festival in Los Angeles. It opened in theaters in the United Kingdom on 30 November 2007. The plot revolves around Muslim fundamentalists taking an American reporter hostage during the U.S. Infinite Justice efforts in Afghanistan.

== Cast ==
- Kevin Collins as Arnold Silverman
- Raza Jaffrey as Kamal Khan
- Jennifer Calvert as Sarah
- Constantine Gregory as Abe Kautsky
- Jeff Mirza as Inspector Akhtar
- Ivana Basic as Salima
- Renu Setna as Masood
