= Civilian (Boy Kill Boy album) =

Studio album by Boy Kill Boy
- Released: 22 May 2006
- Recorded: 2005–2006
- Studios: Sawmills, Golant, Cornwall
- Genres: Dance-punk; indie rock; synth rock
- Length: 45:14
- Label: Vertigo
- Producer: John Cornfield

Boy Kill Boy chronology
| Civilian (2006) | Stars and the Sea (2008) |

Civilian is the debut album by Boy Kill Boy. It was released on 22 May 2006 and reached number 16 in the UK Album Chart.

== Background and production ==
Vocalist and guitarist Chris Peck spent three years playing in a post-Britpop band with his schoolfriend drummer Shaz Mahmood. After a few months of downtime, the pair formed Boy Kill Boy in 2004. The band, now with the addition of keyboardist Pete Carr, added bassist Kevin Chase to the line-up after meeting him at a house party. A month afterwards, the band were due to support another band in London; however, the show was cancelled, and was followed-up by another support slot, this time for Hard-Fi, the week after. "Suzie", backed with "Last of the Great", was released as a single on 16 May 2005, through Fierce Panda Records. Shortly after this, the band signed to Mercury Records, and toured throughout the rest of the year. "Civil Sin" was released as a single on 19 September 2005. Civilian was recorded at Sawmills Studios in Golant, Cornwall with producer John Cornfield, who later mixed the recordings at Landsdowne Recording Studios.

== Composition ==
Musically, the sound of Civilian has been described as dance-punk, indie rock, and synth-rock, with influences from new wave, drawing comparison to the Killers, and Interpol. The opening punk rock track, "Back Again", sets the pace of the album, with an up-tempo guitar riff and synthesizers, and is followed by the synth-pop song "On and On". "Suzie" recalled "Seaside" (2004) by the Ordinary Boys, and is followed by the indie pop song "Six Minutes". "Ivy Parker" is a ballad that was reminiscent of "All These Things That I've Done" (2004) by the Killers. The Smiths-indebted "Civil Sin" has a chorus section in the style of Good Mourning (2003)-era Alkaline Trio, and the goth punk of My Chemical Romance. "Friday – Friday" details violence in a small town, and features a pseudo-ska drum pattern. "Shoot Me Down" is a ballad with a sparse arrangement, done in the vein of Morrissey and Simple Minds; the album ends with the folk-esque "Exit".

== Release ==
"Back Again" was released as a single on 13 February 2006; the CD version included "Cheaper". Two versions were released on vinyl: The first included "Number One", while the second featured "In Disgrace". In March 2006, the band performed at the entertainment conference South by Southwest in the United States. Civilian was released on 22 May 2006. "Suzie" was released as a single on 17 July 2006. Two versions were released on CD: The first featured "It's Different for Girls" as an extra track, while the second featured "Orphan" and a live version of "Six Minutes" as extra tracks. The vinyl version included "Last of the Great"; in Europe, "Suzie" was released as the EP Suzie EP, which also featured "It's Different for Girls", "Last of the Great", the Fallout recording of "Civil Sin", and the Fierce Panda version of "Suzie".

Civilian was released in the US in on 25 July 2006. "Civil Sin" was released as a single on 31 July 2006. Two versions were released on CD: The first included "Look Away", while the other featured "See Saw" and "Catch". In August 2006, they appeared at the Lollapalooza festival. "Shoot Me Down" was released as a single on 6 November 2006; the CD version included a live version of "Maneater". Two versions were released on vinyl: The first included "Repair", while the other featured "Dukes of John Moon".

The song "Suzie" was featured in the soundtrack for the video game FIFA Street 2

== Reception ==
Professional ratings
Review scores
| Source | Rating |
|---|---|
| AllMusic | 4/5 stars |
| Drowned in Sound | 5/10 |
| Gigwise | 4/10 stars |
| The Guardian | 2/5 stars |
| IGN | 6.6/10 |
| Melodic | 3.5/5 stars |
| NME | 6/10 |
| Pitchfork | 5.1/10 |
| PopMatters | 4/10 |
| The Skinny | 3/5 stars |

Civilian was met with mixed reviews from music critics.

AllMusic reviewer Tammy La Gorce wrote that the band, "based on the lingering head-buzz this debut so unsparingly brings on, is headed for the big time". Malky B of The Skinny wrote that "perhaps they are too close musically to the sound of The Killers, but it is clear that 'Civilian' is an adrenaline-charged work that grants the listener instant gratification". Drowned in Sound writer Dom Gourlay remarked that some of the band's detractors might say that the bulk of the album might be "lagging behind in the quality stakes", which he agreed with. David Renshaw of Gigwise similarly said it was a "bit of a let down", coming across sounding "forced and unnatural". He said that if listeners bought it, they would "enjoy it but you will also have forgotten it by the time you turn it off". IGN's Chad Grischow thought that the album had an "edge that keeps it from becoming a complete waste of time, but Boy Kill Boy's sound is too sloppy to overlook the lack of innovation".

PopMatters's Dan Raper said the album "ain’t that bad. It’s a confident and stylish debut by a band that is cautiously pushing" their sound. He added that the "catchiness [which] is ultimately disappointing. To explain: the band chases hooks wildly, without a thought of development or innovation". NME writer Tim Chester said that where other acts attempt the "throw-enough-shit-at-the-wall-and-some-will-stick approach (see: Mystery Jets) BKB prefer throw-the-same-shit-relentlessly, and thus have an album here with a good tune, nine times". The Guardian critic Betty Clarke compared several songs to contemporary acts, but the "band Boy Kill Boy resemble most isn't one of today's chart-botherers: it's a bunch of long-forgotten indie also-rans". Pitchfork contributor Rachel Khong saw it as "little more than overhyped, albeit danceable déjà vu-- repeating and threepeating ad infinitum, nauseum [...] turning out near-spitting images of their precursors, contributing little else to a no longer cozy dancerock niche".

== Track listing ==
All songs written by Boy Kill Boy.

1. "Back Again" – 3:06
2. "On and On" – 3:48
3. "Suzie" – 3:19
4. "Six Minutes" – 4:17
5. "On My Own" – 3:26
6. "Ivy Parker" – 4:12
7. "Civil Sin" – 3:55
8. "Killer" – 3:11
9. "Friday – Friday" – 2:03
10. "Showdown" – 3:36
11. "Shoot Me Down" – 10:16 (includes hidden track "Exit", which starts at 5:37)

== Personnel ==
Personnel per booklet.

Boy Kill Boy

- Chris Peck – vocals, guitar
- Kevin Chase – bass
- Peter Carr – keyboards
- Shaz Mahmood – drums

Production and design

- John Cornfield – producer, mixing
- Big Active – art direction
- Markus Karlsson – design
- Carina Jirsch – band photo
