= The Blood of Hussain =

1980 film by Jamil Dehlavi

- Directed by: Jamil Dehlavi
- Written by: Rafiq Abdullah; Jamil Dehlavi
- Produced by: Jamil Dehlavi
- Starring: Salmaan Peerzada; Aliya Begum; Khayyam Sarhadi; Kika Markham; Jamil Dehlavi; Samina Peerzada; Shoaib Hashmi
- Cinematography: Walter Lassally
- Distributed by: Parindah Films Ltd; Cinegate Limited
- Release date: 1980
- Running time: 112 minutes
- Country: Pakistan
- Language: English

The Blood of Hussain is a 1980 Pakistani drama film directed by Jamil Dehlavi. The film was released in February 1981 in the UK. The film was banned throughout Pakistan as the military junta, led by General Zia-ul-Haq, toppled the government of Zulfiqar Ali Bhutto.

== Premise ==
The film is about the life and death of Hussain, the youngest son of a Pakistani family. He meets a holy soothsayer who foretells his destiny, which is to liberate the poor and oppressed against a tyrannical government. Parallels exist between the film's plot and the historical Battle of Karbala between Imam Hussain and Yazid ibn Muawiya during the 7th century history of Islam.

== Cast ==
- Aliya Begum
- Durriya
- Fauzia Zareen
- Kabuli Baba
- Khayyam Sarhadi
- Imran Peerzada
- Kika Markham
- Jamil Dehlavi
- Mirza Ghazanfar Beg
- Mubila
- Salmaan Peerzada
- Samina Peerzada
- Saqi
- Shoaib Hashmi
- Zil-e-Subhan

== Banning ==
The film was banned by the Pakistani military ruler General Zia ul-Haq, after he seized power in a coup de état and became President of Pakistan in 1977, as the film portrays a fictional military coup in a less than favourable light. The ban on the film has not been lifted, and the director later moved to the United Kingdom. The film was eventually released and shown on British television.

== See also ==
- Jamil Dehlavi
