= Michael McCullers =

American writer and director (born 1971)

- Born: 1971 (age 54–55); United States
- Occupations: Screenwriter, film director

Michael McCullers (born 1971) is an American writer and director.

== Early life ==
A native of Vestavia Hills, Alabama, McCullers attended Indian Springs School which is a private high school in Indian Springs Village, Alabama. He was awarded a National Merit Scholarship.

== Career ==
McCullers began his career as a writer for Saturday Night Live. He co-wrote the scripts for Austin Powers: The Spy Who Shagged Me and Austin Powers in Goldmember, from the Austin Powers film series which stars Mike Myers.

McCullers wrote and directed the 2008 comedy Baby Mama, starring Tina Fey and Amy Poehler. In 1999, he signed a deal with New Line Cinema to write comedies.

He wrote the 2017 film The Boss Baby for DreamWorks Animation, and with Genndy Tartakovsky co-wrote Hotel Transylvania 3: Summer Vacation (2018) for Sony Pictures Animation.

In 2023, he was brought on to write material for the film Ruby Gillman, Teenage Kraken.

McCullers was hired to write Shrek 5 for DreamWorks Animation.

== Personal life ==
McCullers lives in Los Angeles with his wife and four children.

== Filmography ==
Film

Year	Title	Director	Writer	Notes
1999	Austin Powers: The Spy Who Shagged Me	No	Yes	
2002	Undercover Brother	No	Yes	
2002	Austin Powers in Goldmember	No	Yes	
2004	Thunderbirds	No	Yes	
2008	Baby Mama	Yes	Yes	
2014	Mr. Peabody & Sherman	No	Uncredited	Additional screenplay material
2017	The Boss Baby	No	Yes	
2018	Hotel Transylvania 3: Summer Vacation	No	Yes	
2021	The Boss Baby: Family Business	No	Yes	Story with Tom McGrath
2023	Ruby Gillman, Teenage Kraken	No	Uncredited	Additional screenplay material with Meghan Mallow, Kirk DeMicco and Faryn Pearl
2027	Shrek 5	No	Yes	

Television

Year	Title	Director	Writer	Executive Producer	Notes
1997–1998	Saturday Night Live	No	Yes	No	20 episodes
2000	Saturday Night Live: The Best of Chris Farley	No	Yes	No	Documentary special
2005	Enough About Me	Yes	Yes	Yes	TV movie
2009	Parks and Recreation	Yes	No	No	Episode "Boys' Club"
