= Stars and the Sea =

Studio album by Boy Kill Boy
- Released: 31 March 2008
- Recorded: 2007
- Studios: Sunset Sound, Hillside Manor
- Genres: Alternative rock, indie pop
- Length: 43:01
- Label: Vertigo
- Producer: Dave Sardy

Boy Kill Boy chronology
Civilian (2006)	Stars and the Sea (2008)

Professional ratings
Review scores
Source	Rating
Drowned in Sound	6/10
Gigwise	2/5 stars
The Irish Times	3/5 stars
The Press	4/5 stars

Stars and the Sea is the second and final album by Boy Kill Boy. It was released on 31 March 2008. It was recorded in three recording studios in Cornwall, Brighton, and Los Angeles. The track, "Loud and Clear", was made available for a free download from the band's website.

Much deliberation was made over the name of the album. In the December 2007 edition of Uncut, the magazine claimed that it would be a self-titled album, also HMV had the title listed as Loud and Clear, although MTV2UK and Amazon had both named it Stars and the Sea. It was finally announced in early November 2007 that it would be called this.

It charted at number 98 on 6 April 2008. The relatively poor sales of the record and subsequent label issues have been claimed to be behind the split of the band later in 2008.

== Production ==
Recording took place at Sunset Sound and Hillside Manor, with producer Dave Sardy. Ryan Castle served as the main engineer, with Cameron Barton as secondary engineer at Hillside Manor, and Clifton Allen as secondary engineer at Sunset Sound. Andy Brohard did Pro Tools editing and additional engineering, while Greg Gordon did additional editing. Sardy mixed the recordings, before the album was mastered by Stephen Marcussen at Marcussen Mastering.

== Track listing ==
All songs and lyrics by Chris Peck. All arrangements by Boy Kill Boy.

1. "Promises" – 3:30
2. "No Conversation" – 3:59
3. "Be Somebody" – 3:26
4. "Loud + Clear" – 3:39
5. "Paris" – 3:52
6. "A-OK" – 4:13
7. "Ready to Go" – 4:12
8. "Rosie's on Fire" – 3:33
9. "Kidda – Kidda" – 4:40
10. "Pen 'n Ink" – 3:18
11. "Two Souls" – 4:38

== Personnel ==
Personnel per booklet.

Boy Kill Boy

- Chris Peck – vocals, guitar
- Shaz Mahmood – drums
- Kevin Chase – bass
- Peter Carr – keyboards

Production and design

- Dave Sardy – producer, mixing
- Ryan Castle – engineer
- Andy Brohard – Pro Tools editing, additional engineer
- Cameron Barton – second engineer
- Clifton Allen – second engineer
- Greg Gordon – additional editing
- Stephen Marcussen – mastering
- Intro – design
- Victoria Smith – band photography
