= Alien War =

Total reality experience in the United Kingdom

Alien War logo for 2007

Alien War London logo

Alien War was a "total reality" experience in the United Kingdom that originally opened at the Arches in Glasgow in April 1992 themed around the Alien series of films. Created by John Gorman and Gary Gillies, the attraction had a short run as a mobile event at various exhibition centres in the UK (including the Bournemouth International Centre and the Aberdeen Exhibition and Conference Centre). On 15 October 1993 it opened in the basement of the Trocadero centre in London. The permanent attraction in London closed after a flood in August 1996 and was never reopened. It made a short return between December 1999 and January 2000 in the Scottish Exhibition and Conference Centre in Glasgow in a modified form.

== Technology ==
The marines originally carried blank firing pistols. For Alien War London, an innovative electronic system called Soundfire was developed to allow the weapons to sound like those used in the film Aliens. The system consisted of M41A pulse rifles with infrared transmitters and small strobe lights (to simulate muzzle flash). When the trigger is pulled a signal is transmitted to receivers hidden in the set. A central computer then plays gunfire sound effects to speakers in the correct area of the set. The method of producing the effect was entirely different from how it would be imagined the weapons would discharge. The strobe lights also resembled blue camera flashes, and did not resemble a muzzleflash. The system also played other sound effects such as the Alien sounds and suffered teething troubles in the first months after opening meaning that the blank firing pistols had to be used for most early shows.

The show was seen in various guises and briefly featured an actor dressed as the Predator for a spell prior to it closing in Glasgow.

== Alien War 2008 ==
Alien War (now called Alien Wars) opened at its original home at the Arches Glasgow on 6 December 2008 and ran until 30 August 2009 in a modified format that is unrelated to the 20th Century Fox film series. It opened in Liverpool at Wirral's spaceport and ran until March 2010.

A number of exhibits from Alien War and the associated Movie Magic Exhibition, Glasgow, were acquired by IDEAS, the Edinburgh-based design consultancy, intended for inclusion within the UFO Land, Sci-Fi Museum, part of the Zenith Project and Scarborough Council.
