= Boy Kill Boy =

English rock band

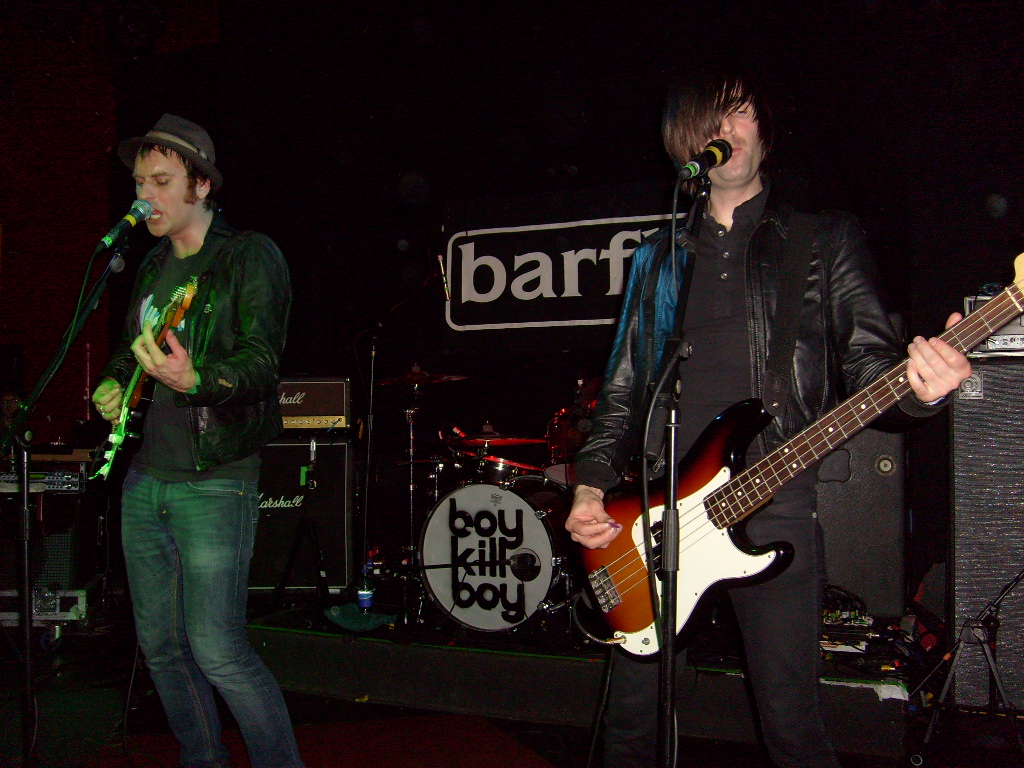
- Boy Kill Boy playing live in Birmingham, 2008

Background information
- Origin: Leytonstone, London, England
- Genres: Alternative rock, indie rock, post-punk revival
- Years active: 2004–2008, 2016, 2026–present
- Labels: Vertigo, Island
- Past members: Chris Peck; Kev Chase; Shaz Mahmood; Pete Carr

Boy Kill Boy are an English rock band originally based in Leytonstone, East London. The band produced two studio albums and six singles before splitting in 2008. Their highest-charting single was "Suzie", which reached #17 in the UK singles chart in 2006. The band has announced a new show at Scala (club) in London on 29th October 2026 to celebrate the 20th anniversary of their debut album Civilian.

== History ==
Before forming Boy Kill Boy, Chris Peck, Pete Carr and Shaz Mahmood were in a band called Future of Junior and produced a few songs including a track called "Miss Scandinavia". In May 2005, Boy Kill Boy released their debut single "Suzie" for record label Fierce Panda. In the summer the band opened the Radio 1 stage on Sunday/Friday of the 2005 Reading and Leeds Festivals. Their second single followed later that year through Fallout Records, a subsidiary of Island Records. "Civil Sin" was featured as Zane Lowe's "Hottest Track In The World Today".

In 2005, Boy Kill Boy signed to Vertigo Records. In 2006, the single "Back Again" reached No. 26 in the UK Singles Chart, which earned them a slot on Top of the Pops, and the re-release of "Suzie" reached No. 17. Their debut album Civilian was released in the UK on 22 May 2006 and entered the UK Albums Chart at No. 16. The album was released in North America on 25 July 2006, where it reached No. 11 on Billboard's Top Heatseekers chart.

In May 2005, the band stepped in to replace Nine Black Alps on the NME New Music Tour 2005 after the band's frontman Sam Forrest caught the mumps. Boy Kill Boy had only been billed to play one support slot on the tour but ended up playing numerous extra slots supporting Maxïmo Park, The Cribs and The Rakes. They returned the following year as headliners for NME's New Bands Tour 2006, supported by The Automatic, ¡Forward, Russia!, and The Long Blondes. Boy Kill Boy's "Suzie", was US iTunes Single of The Week in March 2006, this was followed with a US tour supporting The Charlatans and Echo & the Bunnymen.

Boy Kill Boy opened the Radio 1 / NME stage at Reading and Leeds Festival in 2005, and returned in 2006 to play higher up the bill. In October 2006 the band played an extensive UK Headline tour. On 7 November 2006, they supported Feeder for one of their dates in aid of War Child at the Camden Roundhouse. This was also in conjunction with the "Shoot Me Down" single, released for the charity.

In 2006 the band performed a cover of Nelly Furtado's "Maneater" for BBC Radio 1's Live Lounge.

The Fierce Panda release of "Suzie" appeared on the soundtrack of the street football video game FIFA Street 2, released in winter 2006 by Electronic Arts. "Civil Sin" appeared on the soundtrack to the FIFA 07 football video game. Also, their single "Back Again" appears in the Test Drive Unlimited videogame.

Boy Kill Boy recorded their second album in Los Angeles with Oasis producer Dave Sardy, and returned with the limited edition single "No Conversation" on 5 November 2007. The album, entitled Stars and the Sea, was released on 31 March 2008. However, the album failed to repeat the success of their debut, and rumours of a split began surfacing. On 12 October 2008, Boy Kill Boy confirmed this via an announcement on their MySpace site.

Singer Chris Peck subsequently started a new project and, on 11 January 2011, posted a video clip on YouTube for a new song called "Riversong". Peter Carr went on to play keyboards in singer-songwriter Marina and the Diamonds' backing band.

The band briefly reformed for two gigs at Oslo, Hackney, London, on 19 November 2016 and 25 November 2016.

== Members ==
- Chris Peck (lead vocals, guitar)
- Kevin Chase (bass guitar, vocals)
- Peter Carr (keyboards)
- Shaz Mahmood (drums)

== Discography ==
=== Studio albums ===
List of studio albums, with selected chart positions and certifications
Title	Details	Peak chart positions			Certifications
Title	Details	UK	SCO	US Heat	Certifications
Civilian	Release date: 22 May 2006; Label: Vertigo; Formats: CD, LP, digital download	16	15	11	BPI: Silver
Stars and the Sea	Release date: 31 March 2008; Label: Vertigo; Formats: CD, LP, digital download	98	—	—	
"—" denotes a recording that did not chart or was not released in that territory.

=== Singles ===
List of singles, with selected chart positions, showing year released and album name
Title	Year	Peak chart positions			Album
Title	Year	UK	UK Indie	SCO	Album
"Suzie! / Last Of The Great"	2005	130	18	99	Civilian
"Civil Sin / On and On"	2005	—	—	—	Civilian
"Back Again"	2006	26	—	30	Civilian
"Suzie" (re-issue)	2006	17	—	12	Civilian
"Civil Sin" (re-issue)	2006	44	—	36	Civilian
"Shoot Me Down"	2006	63	—	49	Civilian
"No Conversation"	2007	—	—	—	Stars and the Sea
"Promises"	2008	121	—	33	Stars and the Sea
"—" denotes releases that did not chart
