= Kate Maravan =

Kate Maravan (born 1968) is a British actress, acting teacher, and co-founder of White Box, a resident theatre company at the Actors Centre, in London. She is best known for playing Laura Dunnford in the British television comedy series Broken News. Maravan trained at RADA, and teaches the Meisner Technique at the Royal Court Theatre. She has also taught for the International Institute of Performing Arts in Paris.

== Television ==
- 2012 Lewis as Susanna Leland in S6:E2 “Generation of Vipers”
- 2016 The Coroner as Roz Bryant in S2:E5 “The Captain’s Pipe”
