= Baby Mama (film) =

2008 film by Michael McCullers

- Theatrical release poster
- Directed by: Michael McCullers
- Written by: Michael McCullers
- Produced by: Lorne Michaels; John Goldwyn
- Starring: Tina Fey; Amy Poehler; Greg Kinnear; Dax Shepard; Romany Malco; Maura Tierney; Holland Taylor; Sigourney Weaver
- Cinematography: Daryn Okada
- Edited by: Bruce Green
- Music by: Jeff Richmond
- Production companies: Relativity Media; Michaels/Goldwyn Productions; Broadway Video
- Distributed by: Universal Pictures
- Release date: April 25, 2008
- Running time: 99 minutes
- Country: United States
- Language: English
- Budget: $30 million
- Box office: $64.4 million

Baby Mama is a 2008 American buddy comedy film written and directed by Michael McCullers in his directorial debut and starring Tina Fey, Amy Poehler, Greg Kinnear, Dax Shepard, Romany Malco, Maura Tierney, Holland Taylor, with Steve Martin, and Sigourney Weaver.

Produced by Relativity Media, Baby Mama was distributed by Universal Pictures on April 25, 2008. It received moderately positive reviews and grossed $64 million worldwide.

== Plot ==
Successful single business executive Kate Holbrook, from Philadelphia, has focused primarily on her career and decides at age 37 that she wants to have a child. After learning that she has a T-shaped uterus, which reduces her chances of becoming pregnant, she considers other options for starting a family. When her attempt to adopt is unsuccessful, Kate hires Angie Ostrowski, a woman from South Philadelphia, to serve as her surrogate mother. The two women subsequently become involved in a complicated arrangement that develops beyond their initial agreement.

After learning from Chaffee Bicknell, the steely head of their surrogacy center, that Angie has become pregnant, Kate prepares for motherhood in her own typically driven fashion; reading childcare books, baby-proofing the apartment, and researching top pre-schools. However, her strategy is upended when Angie shows up at her door, having been kicked out by her common-law husband Carl. Their conflicting personalities put them at odds as Kate learns first-hand about balancing motherhood and career, especially when she begins dating the owner of a local blended-juice cafe, Rob Ackerman.

Unbeknownst to Kate, Angie's in-vitro fertilization procedure had failed and she is feigning the pregnancy, hoping to ultimately run off with her payment. She starts to regret lying, but continually puts off confessing. During an ultrasound, Angie discovers she is actually pregnant.

Angie quickly realizes the baby is hers and Carl's and decides to keep it. Carl shows up at Kate's baby shower to expose Angie, forcing her to admit the truth. Kate, however, insists that the baby could still be hers, as Angie did not wait the recommended two weeks after the procedure before taking the test.

A court hearing determines that the baby is Angie's, and Angie passionately apologizes to Kate. As the women meet face-to-face after the proceedings, Angie's water breaks and Kate rushes her to the hospital, then passes out during the birth. As she wakes up, the doctor supervising Angie tells Kate that she is two months pregnant (the result of her relationship with Rob). After receiving the news, she visits Angie, who is holding her newborn daughter Stef, named for Gwen Stefani. Kate forgives Angie and they become best friends, ultimately changing each other for the better.

A year later at Stef's first-birthday party, Kate and Rob have had a daughter and are engaged, and Angie and Kate have retained a sister-like relationship. Although he does not reunite with Angie, Carl stays close to his daughter and takes parenting classes. In the final scene, Angie and Kate are sitting in front of a television set with their daughters, watching Tom and Jerry cartoons.

== Cast ==
- Tina Fey as Katherine "Kate" Holbrook – Mother
- Amy Poehler as Angela "Angie" Ostrowski – Surrogate mother
- Greg Kinnear as Rob Ackerman – SuperFruity cafe owner
- Dax Shepard as Carl Loomis – Angie's 'Common Law' husband
- Sigourney Weaver as Chaffee Bicknell – Surrogate agent
- Romany Malco as Oscar Priyan – Doorman
- Maura Tierney as Caroline – Kate's sister
- Holland Taylor as Rose Holbrook – Kate's mother
- James Rebhorn as Judge
- John Hodgman as Fertility Specialist
- Siobhan Fallon Hogan as The Birthing Teacher
- Denis O'Hare as Dr. Manheim
- Stephen Mailer as Dan
- Steve Martin as Barry Waterman – Kate's boss – Round Earth Organic Market
- Kevin Collins as Rick – Round Earth employee
- Will Forte as Scott – Kate's former boyfriend
- Fred Armisen as The Stroller Salesman
- Thomas McCarthy as Kate's Date
- Jason Mantzoukas as Jonothan – Surrogate father
- Dave Finkel as Gay Couple
- Brian Stack as Dave

== Reception ==
=== Critical reception ===
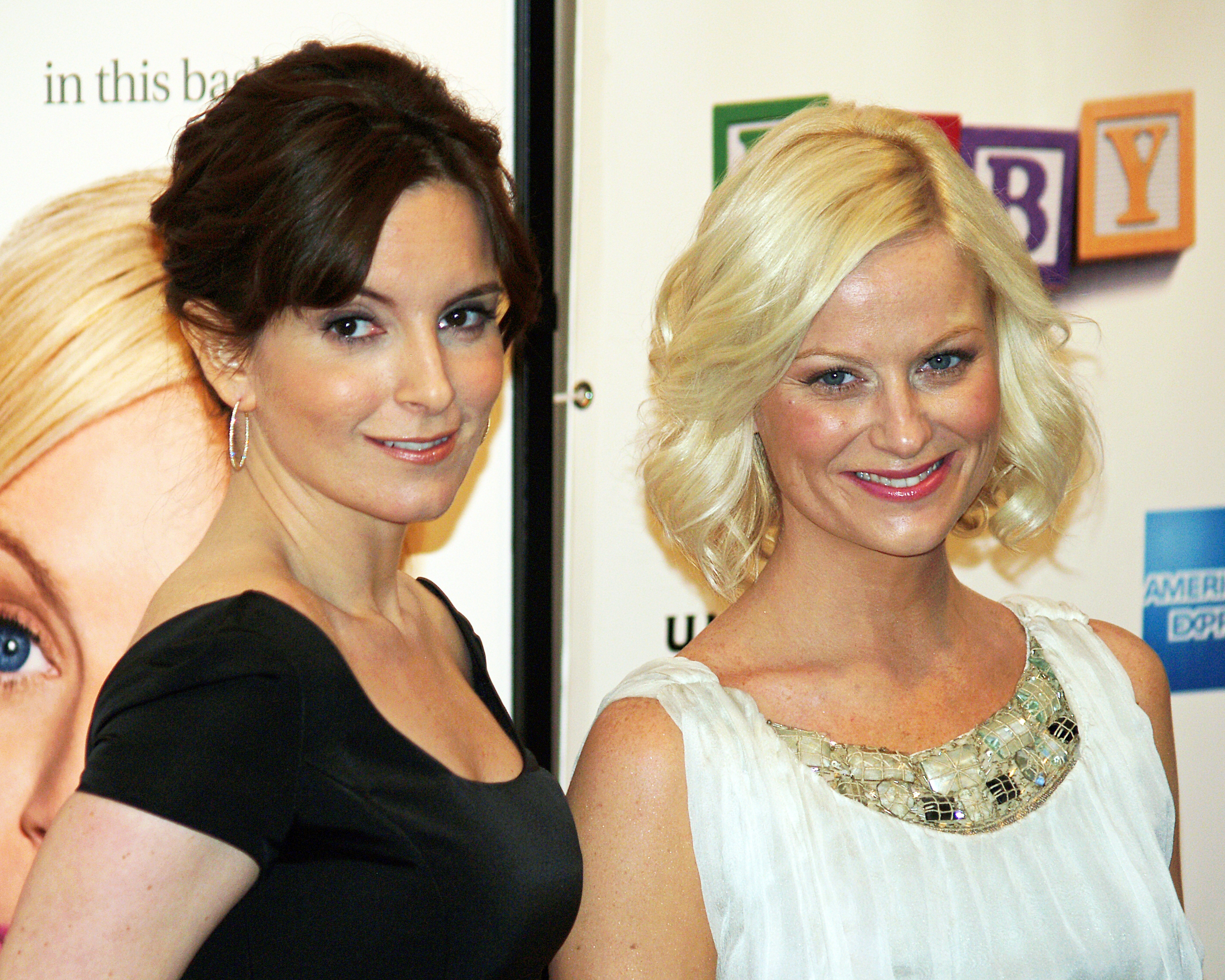
Fey and Poehler at the premiere

On review aggregator Rotten Tomatoes, the film holds an approval rating of 63% based on 166 reviews, with an average rating of 6.20/10. The website's critics consensus reads: "Baby Mama is a lightweight, predictable comedy that ekes by on the strength of its performers." On Metacritic, the film has a weighted average score of 55 out of 100, based on 34 critics, indicating "mixed or average" reviews. Audiences polled by CinemaScore gave the film an average grade of "B+" on an A+ to F scale.

Todd McCarthy of Variety called Baby Mama a "tidily wrapped package the contents of which you can easily guess before opening it." Peter Bradshaw of The Guardian gave the film three stars out of five and wrote: "Like a great big tube of barbecue-flavoured Pringles, this film is far from being good for you, and it conforms to far too many of the romcom cliches to be in any way respectable - and yet it is enjoyable and amiable in its daft way." Lisa Schwarzbaum of Entertainment Weekly gave it a grade of "B" and called the film a "teeteringly uneven comedy" and that it "isn’t much of a conversation starter, but it does at least bring a politicized raised eyebrow to the sacred realm of pregnancy and motherhood among a certain estrogenically mindful population of entitled thirtysomethings."

=== Box office ===
In its opening weekend, Baby Mama grossed $17,407,110 in 2,543 theaters in the United States and Canada, ranking #1 at the box office and averaging $6,845 per theater. Baby Mama eventually grossed a total of $64,163,648. Its production budget was $30 million.

=== Home media ===
Baby Mama was released on September 9, 2008, on both DVD and Blu-ray. Extras included commentary with writer/director Michael McCullers and cast members Tina Fey and Amy Poehler, From Conception to Delivery: The Making of Baby Mama featurette, an alternate ending, deleted scenes, and Saturday Night Live: Legacy of Laughter.
