= Blue Raincoat Theatre Company =

Irish theatre company

Blue Raincoat Theatre Company is a professional theatre company based in Sligo, Ireland. It is the longest-running theatre ensemble in Ireland.

== Company ==
Founded in 1991, Blue Raincoat has staged 63 productions, 14 of which were world premieres. The company is a venue-based theatre ensemble, and performs primarily in The Factory Performance Space in Sligo, although it also tours throughout Ireland. The Factory Performance Space was originally a warehouse dating to the 1800s, but it was converted to a performance and training center during the 1990s. The Blue Raincoat Theatre Company won the national AIB "Better Ireland" award for the development project in 1999. This project was overseen by Hamilton Young Architects' former director David Lawlor. Due to their contribution to the project, Hamilton Young Architects won the national COTHU Business Sponsorship of the Year award.

The company's other performance venues include the National Theatre of Ireland and the Dublin Theatre Festival. Blue Raincoat has also performed at theatres in London, Berlin, Warsaw, Madrid, Bucharest and Sofia. Blue Raincoat operate ongoing outreach programmes, national training seminars, internal training, the Cairde Community Festival and music events.

== Productions ==
Every year, Blue Raincoat produces between four and six professional productions, emphasizing on modern European classics, new writing, and new stage adaptations. It has a repertory system to tour these productions throughout Ireland and internationally. For over three decades, the company has been touring its works throughout Ireland with shows like Alice Through the Looking Glass, The Third Policeman, The Bald Soprano, and Shackleton.

In 2013, Blue Raincoat began its season with Endgame by Samuel Beckett.
