= Media Blitz =

- Parks and Recreation episode
- Episode no.: Season 3 Episode 5
- Directed by: David Rogers
- Written by: Harris Wittels
- Original air date: February 17, 2011

Guest appearances
- Alison Becker as Shauna Malwae-Tweep; Matt Besser as Crazy Ira; Danny Cho as China Joe; Mo Collins as Joan Callamezzo; Rachel Drummond as Louise; Kurt Havlick as Security Guard; Jay Jackson as Perd Hapley; Nick Kroll as The Douche; Minni Jo Mazzola as Natalie Ludgate; Jeris Lee Poindexter as George

Episode chronology
← Previous "Ron & Tammy: Part Two"	Next → "Indianapolis"
- Parks and Recreation season 3

"Media Blitz" is the fifth episode of the third season of the American comedy television series Parks and Recreation, and the 35th overall episode of the series. It originally aired on NBC in the United States on February 17, 2011. In the episode, the parks department tries to draw media attention for the upcoming harvest festival, but the press becomes fixated on Ben's past political mistakes. Meanwhile, Andy Dwyer takes on all of April Ludgate's errands with the hopes of convincing her not to move to Indianapolis.

Written by Harris Wittels and directed by David Rogers, "Media Blitz" revolved largely around Ben's backstory as a child mayor who bankrupted his old town, which was originally a concept considered for series protagonist Leslie Knope. The episode was also what series co-creator Michael Schur called a "key moment" for April and Andy, ending a multi-episode subplot of April being angry with Andy for having been kissed by Ann in the second season finale "Freddy Spaghetti". "Media Blitz" featured guest appearances by comedians Matt Besser and Nick Kroll as morning zoo-style radio hosts "Crazy Ira and The Douche," as well as appearances by frequent Parks and Recreation guest stars Mo Collins, Alison Becker, and Jay Jackson.

According to Nielsen Media Research, "Media Blitz" was seen by 4.33 million household viewers. It marked the lowest rating for the season to date, and constituted a more than eight percent drop from the previous episode, "Ron & Tammy: Part Two". "Media Blitz" received generally positive reviews, with several commentators particularly praising the performance of Adam Scott as Ben. Some reviews, however, found less effective a subplot about the uncertainty surrounding the romantic relationship of Ann and Chris Traeger, a state auditor played by Rob Lowe who is supposed to leave Pawnee for Indianapolis soon.

== Plot ==
Leslie, Tom and Ben start promoting the upcoming Harvest Festival on several Pawnee media outlets, starting with the local morning zoo radio show "Crazy Ira and The Douche". The duo begin asking Ben questions about his time as a teen mayor in Partridge, Minnesota, having researched how he bankrupted the town. Ben responds awkwardly, stammering incomprehensibly and unable to defend himself to Crazy Ira and The Douche's taunts. Tom proposes dumping Ben from future media interviews, but Leslie insists they cannot because he is the only one who can handle complicated questions about its budget. Meanwhile, April accepts an offer from Chris to move to Indianapolis to be his secretary. Andy begs April to reconsider, offering to perform all the errands that she hates doing for a month. Ron volunteers to help, claiming that he does not want to lose April as an assistant while denying he cares about April and Andy's relationship. Ann is increasingly frustrated that Chris has not asked her about coming to Indianapolis with him, and is concerned about where their relationship is headed.

Unfortunately, Ben's past comes up again during Leslie's interview with newspaper reporter Shauna Malwae-Tweep, who asks why Pawnee should accept financial guidance from someone with a poor budget managing record like Ben. Tom and Ben go on the television show "Ya' Heard? with Perd" with Perd Hapley in the hopes of recovering from the earlier debacle, but this interview is even worse, with Ben launching into a furious, incoherent rant when his past is brought up. As a result, several businesses consider pulling their sponsorships from the Harvest Festival. Leslie decides to use her upcoming interview on "Pawnee Today" with Joan Callamezzo to perform damage control. During the interview, Joan asks very biased questions about the festival and Ben's past. Annoyed, Leslie brings Ben on stage to give him a final opportunity to explain himself. Ben again begins to freeze up at the questions from people calling in, but he finally gets over it and vigorously defends himself. By the end, the questions switch back from Ben to the festival itself, making the media blitz a successful one after all.

Chris tells Ann that after Indianapolis, he will be sent to a different city. The two agree they need to talk about the future of their relationship. Meanwhile, Andy's difficult day of running errands for April culminates with him getting arrested after April's sister Natalie claims he is kidnapping her when he is merely picking her up from school. Ron approaches April and tells her that she should either forgive Andy or cut him loose, believing that she is only stringing Andy along and going to Indianapolis to spite him. When Andy returns, April finally forgives him and kisses him.

== Production ==
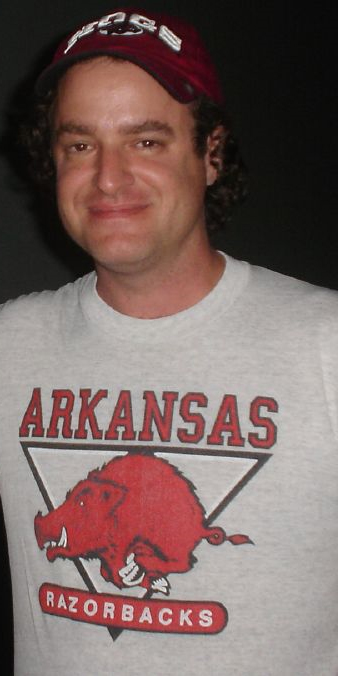
Comedians Matt Besser and Nick Kroll portrayed the morning zoo-style radio hosts "Crazy Ira and The Douche" in "Media Blitz".

"Media Blitz" was written by Harris Wittels and directed by David Rogers. Like all of the first six third season episodes, it was written and filmed almost immediately after the second season ended as part of an early shooting schedule due to Amy Poehler's pregnancy. However, although finished early in anticipation of a September 2010 release date, Parks was ultimately placed on hiatus until early 2011, many months after production on "Media Blitz" was already finished. "Media Blitz" featured guest appearances by Matt Besser and Nick Kroll as, respectively, "Crazy Ira and The Douche", the hosts of a Pawnee morning zoo-style radio show. Kroll is a stand-up comedian who had appeared in shows like Cavemen and The League, while Besser is a comedian from the Upright Citizens Brigade, a sketch comedy show and troupe which also featured Amy Poehler. Parks and Recreation co-creator Michael Schur said the Douche was invented because the Parks and Recreation staff liked Kroll and tried to find a way to work him into the show. The episode also featured several appearances by several frequent guest stars, including Mo Collins as television host Joan Callamezzo, Alison Becker as newspaper writer Shauna Malwae-Tweep, and Jay Jackson as television reporter Perd Hapley.

Much of "Media Blitz" revolves around the backstory of Ben Wyatt, which was introduced in the second season episode "The Master Plan", involving his attempts to rebuild his political career after a humiliating public spectacle as a teen mayor. This was originally a concept the Parks and Recreation creators considered for Leslie Knope's background, but they ultimately abandoned the idea. "Media Blitz" marked the end of a plotline between April and Andy that began with the second-season finale, "Freddy Spaghetti", when Ann kissed Andy just as April had agreed to start dating him. April had been angry with Andy ever since, and Andy had been desperately trying to win her back, culminating with the events in "Media Blitz". Schur called it a "key moment" for April and Andy, and said, "It's almost like Andy’s a Knight of the Round Table, and he’s got a lot of different obstacles that he’s got to overcome in order to win the love of a fair maiden." The episode also continued a development of Ron Swanson's character as more of a father figure to his employees, particularly Andy and April, even though Ron himself outwardly claims not to care about affairs. This began in the episode "Flu Season", where Ron offered advice to Andy about winning April back, and continued in "Media Blitz" with Ron giving April advice that ultimately led her to take Andy back.

== Cultural references ==
In one scene, Leslie claims she unsuccessfully tried to contact Oprah Winfrey, the popular billionaire television host, to seek publicity for the harvest festival. Upon failing to contact Winfrey, Leslie said, "I'm putting it out there, like The Secret, and hopefully she'll call me." The Secret is a 2006 self-help book by Rhonda Byrne that became a best-seller after it was featured on two episodes of The Oprah Winfrey Show. At one point, Tom reveals he shops for clothes at Brooks Brothers Boys, the chain of Brooks Brothers that produces clothes specifically for young boys. Several Pawnee residents in "Media Blitz" refer to using the search engine AltaVista, a site that had not been popular for several years, prompting Ben to ask, "Why does everyone in this town use AltaVista? Is it 1997?" The radio DJs Crazy Ira and The Douche play several sound effects during their show, and when Ben acts awkwardly during the interview, they play the sound effect used when Pac-Man is killed in the maze arcade games.

== Reception ==
=== Ratings ===
In its original American broadcast, "Media Blitz" was seen by an estimated 4.33 million household viewers, according to Nielsen Media Research, with an overall 2.5 rating/4 share, and a 2.2 rating/6 share among viewers between ages 18 and 49. It constituted the lowest rating for the season thus far, and more than an eight percent drop from the previous week's episode, "Ron & Tammy: Part Two". The night "Media Blitz" was broadcast, almost all of the comedy shows in NBC's Thursday lineup lost viewership compared to the prior week. While viewership during Community remained flat, The Office, 30 Rock and Outsourced each saw all their lowest ratings of the season that night, suffering rating declines from the previous week of 6 percent, 13 percent and 12 percent, respectively.

=== Reviews ===
Right now, Parks and Recreation is in its golden period. Every week, the show consistently gives us funny, clever gags while still managing to sneak in heartfelt, genuine moments with the characters. ... If "Media Blitz" is any indication, the show doesn't plan to slow down any time soon.

— Eric Sundermann, Hollywood.com

"Media Blitz" received generally positive reviews, with several commentators particularly praising the performance of Adam Scott, although some said the subplot with Chris and Ann was less effective. TV Guide writer Damian Holbrook wrote, "Party Down vet absolutely stole the show on Parks and Recreation. ... Scott was a machine of mania, a dork gone wild, who gave the rapidly unraveling Ben just the right amount of crazy while completely cracking us up." Hollywood.com writer Eric Sundermann said "Media Blitz" continue a long period of excellent Parks and Recreation episodes, although he said the problems were resolved too quickly at the end of the episode. Sundermann said Scott's slightly over-the-top performance was made especially funny because he is normally such a straight man character. Alan Sepinwall of HitFix praised Scott for his ability to be both a straight man and a more outrageously funny character, as during his meltdowns in media interviews. Sepinwall also complimented Aubrey Plaza's performance and said the overall episode was very funny, but that the main storyline was resolved too quickly.

Time magazine writer James Poniewozik said the episode continued the development of the town of Pawnee, which he said was like a character itself and compared it to The Simpsons' Springfield. Poniewozik said "Media Blitz" also showed how well integrated Scott has become with the cast, and called the "Crazy Ira and The Douche" interview "maybe the most perfect scene P&R has put together yet". Likewise, Steve Heisler of The A.V. Club called Ben's interview with Perd Hapley "one of the best scenes Parks & Rec has ever done". Heisler enjoyed how the series gradually built up Ben Wyatt's backstory throughout the season, "then took it way over-the-top". However, he expressed disappointment that the Ann and Chris subplot ended with no resolution. Zap2it writer Rick Porter, called the episode a "great showcase for Scott's deadpan gifts" and wrote, "This show hasn't had a real miss yet this season." Porter said the April and Andy subplot was less interesting, but he enjoyed the scenes between Ron and Andy. Steve Kandell of New York magazine praised the episode for bringing Scott's character to the forefront, as well as for providing satire on small-town politics without coming across as preachy. Kandell said of the April and Andy story, "If their kiss at the shoeshine stand, as expected and inevitable as it may have been, didn't make your heart soar just a little bit, then you're dead inside and probably just turned on NBC for Outsourced a few minutes early." Joel Keller of TV Squad complimented Scott, calling him a "current-generation Bob Newhart" and "one of those actors who can just give someone a look and it conveys everything you need to know about what his character is thinking". Keller said he also enjoyed seeing April and Andy reconcile, but felt the Crazy Ira and The Douche scene was ineffective because, regarding morning zoo radio shows, "it's hard to parody something that's already a parody of itself".

The Atlantic writer Scott Meslow praised Scott's performance, as well as how the writers have "smartly underplayed" the relationship between Leslie and Ben. Meslow also liked that the April-Andy subplot was now resolved, as he called it the "weakest plotline of the season", but he felt the scenes between Chris and Ann in "Media Blitz" were a rehash of the previous episode. Matt Richenthal of TV Fanatic praised Scott's performance, calling him a master at the straight man role, but said he was funnier the previous week in "Ron & Tammy: Part Two": "The laughs weren't as loud on "Media Blitz," as it was more of a squirm-inducing half hour of television." Matt Fowler of IGN called it a fine episode that was "dominated, in a good way, by its softer, sweeter moments", particularly the kiss between Andy and April, which he said "was so damn sweet that I just couldn't resist it". Although he enjoyed the Perd Hapley interview, Fowler said he did not find Scott's performance otherwise especially funny. Entertainment Weekly writer Hillary Busis also praised Scott's performance, adding, "Did anyone else's heart melt just a little bit at the proud smile that crept across Leslie’s face when Ben found his voice?" Busis also said she was glad the April and Andy reconciled, as April's constant mistreatment of Andy was making it harder and harder to like her character. Busis criticized the Ann and Chris subplot, of which she said, "Wake me up when something actually happens."
