= Flu Season (Parks and Recreation) =

- Parks and Recreation episode
- Episode no.: Season 3 Episode 2
- Directed by: Wendey Stanzler
- Written by: Norm Hiscock
- Original air date: January 27, 2011

Guest appearances
- Terrence Beaser as Ed; Brent Briscoe as J.J.; Michael McGreevey as Preston; Frank Noon as Business Man; Jeanne Simpson as Diane

Episode chronology
| ← Previous "Go Big or Go Home" | Next → "Time Capsule" |
- Parks and Recreation season 3

"Flu Season" (sometimes referred to as "The Flu") is the second episode of the third season of the American comedy television series Parks and Recreation, and the 32nd overall episode of the series. It originally aired on NBC in the United States on January 27, 2011. In the episode, a flu outbreak leaves Leslie ill, but she insists on making a public presentation about her proposed harvest festival. Meanwhile, Andy and Ron bond, and a hospital-bound April torments the nurse Ann.

The episode was written by Norm Hiscock and directed by Wendey Stanzler. The episode included major development of the characters Ann, Ron and Ben, the latter of whom becomes extremely impressed with Leslie, starting a season-long romance subplot between the two characters. Brent Briscoe made a guest appearance as J.J., owner of J.J.'s Diner, a restaurant that has appeared in previous Parks episodes.

According to Nielsen Media Research, "Flu Season" was seen by 5.83 million household viewers, a six percent decline from the previous episode, third season premiere "Go Big or Go Home". The episode received positive reviews, with many commentators calling it one of the show's best episodes. Critics also praised the performance of Rob Lowe during the scenes when Chris is stricken by the flu. Reviewers said the relationship between Chris and Ann made her character much more interesting and funny.

Amy Poehler submitted this episode for judging for her nomination for the Primetime Emmy Award for Outstanding Lead Actress in a Comedy Series in 2011.

== Plot ==
Pawnee, Indiana has been hit with an outbreak of the flu, leaving nurse Ann caring for many sick citizens at the hospital. Among them are April, who constantly mistreats Ann in retaliation for kissing Andy. April asks Ron not to tell Andy she is in the hospital, and Ron is anxious not to get involved in their personal affairs.

Leslie also has the flu, but refuses to leave work because she wants to give a presentation to the Pawnee Chamber of Commerce about the planned Harvest Festival, which she hopes will restore the dwindling budget of the parks department. Ben finally takes a reluctant Leslie to the hospital, where she is admitted with a dangerously high fever and dehydration. Ben and Tom decide to do the presentation themselves, much to the chagrin of Leslie, who does not trust anyone but herself to do it. Tom immediately abandons Ben to hang out with a group of older men at the spa.

To Ann's surprise, Chris has also been admitted to the hospital with the flu. The two have been dating and, although Ann really likes Chris, she fears he is too perfect. However, because the extremely health-conscious Chris has a poor immune system and nearly no body fat, he suffers a complete physical breakdown, which makes Ann feel less intimidated about dating him.

At the department, with April absent from work, Ron asks Andy to fill in as an assistant because the anti-government oriented Ron believes Andy will be ineffective. The two bond over the course of the day, and Andy begins to tell Ron about his problems with April, for whom he still harbors romantic feelings. Although initially not wishing to get involved, Ron reluctantly tells Andy she is at the hospital and he should visit her.

Leslie escapes the hospital and heads back to city hall to deliver the presentation herself. Tom returns from the spa, revealing his friends from the spa are the owners of several car dealerships, which have agreed to lend vehicles to the festival. Although delirious with fever and an excess of flu medication, Leslie delivers a flawless presentation, wildly impressing Ben. She is immediately brought back to the hospital, where Ben tells her 110 businesses have agreed to help with the festival, surpassing the minimum 80 needed.

Meanwhile, Ann remains pleasant throughout her nursing shift despite April's constant abuse. The second her shift ends, however, Ann immediately loses her temper and curses at April. Ann apologizes for kissing Andy, but insists it was a mistake and that April should stop taking it out on Andy. Later, Andy visits April, who pretends to be asleep but smiles, revealing she is happy he came.

At the end of the episode, Chris tells Ben they have been called back to Indianapolis for a new assignment, but both agree to seek an extension to stay in Pawnee longer. Although both claim they want to help organize the Harvest Festival, it is hinted they really want to stay because of Leslie and Ann.

== Production ==
"Flu Season" was written by Norm Hiscock and directed by Wendey Stanzler. Like all six of the first third season episodes, it was written and filmed almost immediately after the second season ended as part of an early shooting schedule needed to accommodate Amy Poehler's pregnancy. However, although finished early in anticipation of a September 2010 release date, Parks was ultimately placed on hiatus until early 2011, many months after production on "Flu Season" was already finished. Although initially titled "The Flu" in original press releases, and referred to as such by several news articles, the episode title was later formally changed to "Flu Season". "Flu Season" continued the subplot of restoring the parks department budget through a harvest festival, which will continue to be a major story arc throughout the first six episodes of the season. Brent Briscoe makes an appearance in "Flu Season" as J.J., the owner of J.J.'s Diner. Although the restaurant appears in the previous episodes "The Reporter", "Summer Catalog" and "The Master Plan", "Flu Season" marked the first appearance of J.J. himself.

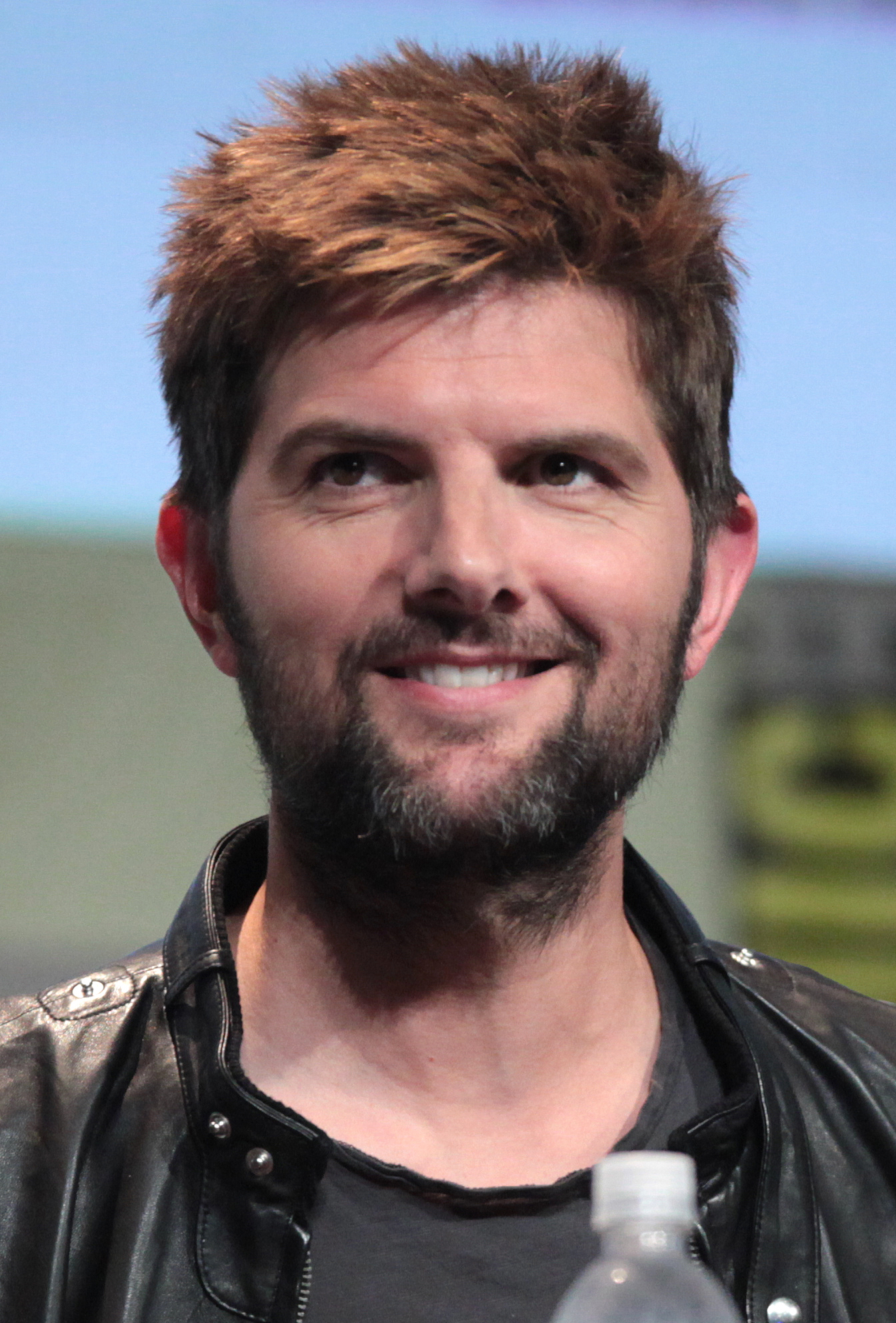
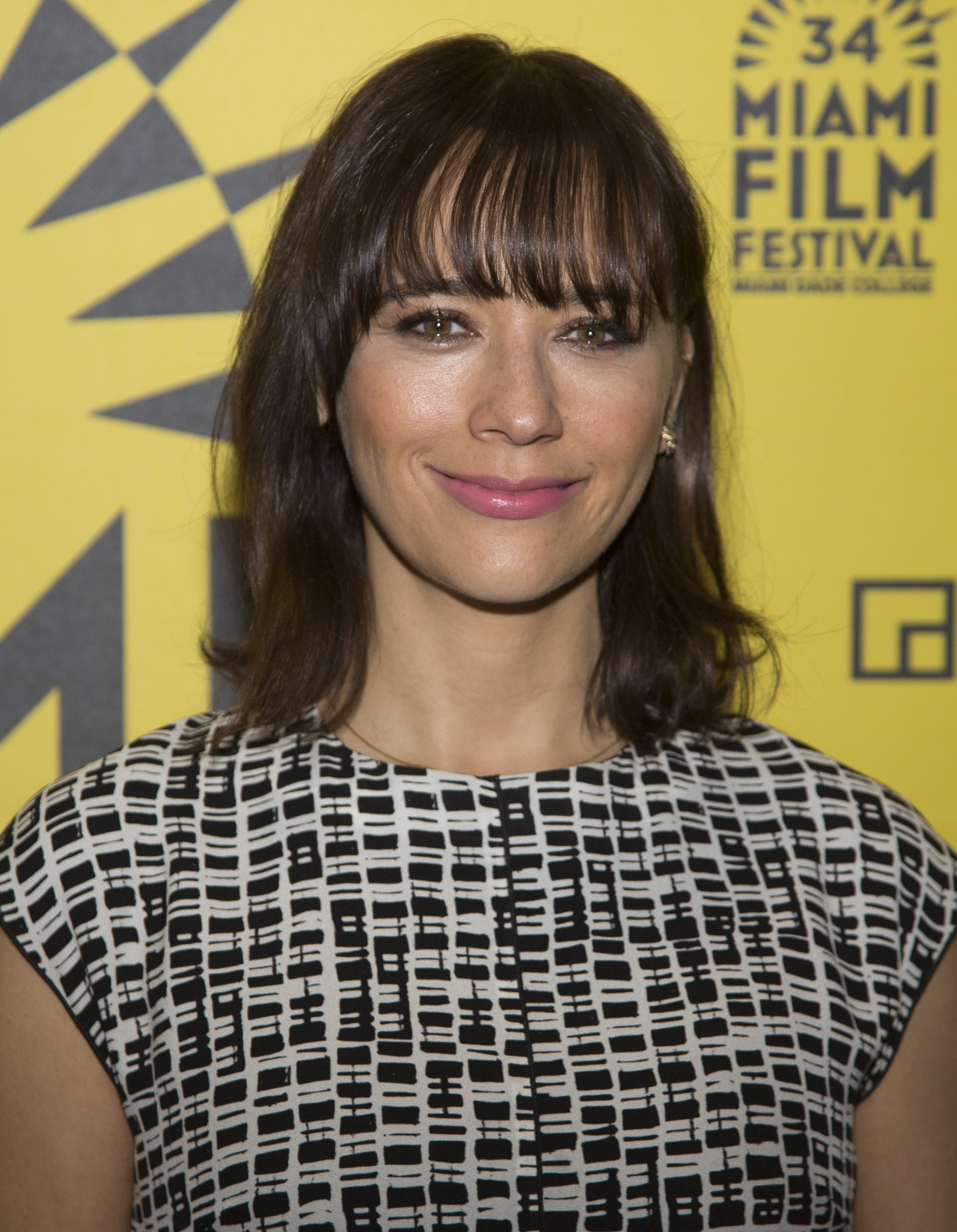
"Flu Season" saw the development of several major characters, including Ben Wyatt, Ann Perkins, and Ron Swanson, played respectively by Adam Scott, Rashida Jones (pictured), and Nick Offerman.

Michael Schur, co-creator of Parks and Recreation, said the episode included development of several of the protagonist characters, including Ben Wyatt, Ann Perkins, and Ron Swanson. One of the major story arcs of the season entails Ben, who had never had a firm sense of home, gradually falling in love with the town of Pawnee due to the optimism and enthusiasm Leslie Knope shows for the town and her job. Commentators suggested this transition appeared to begin in "Flu Season", when Ben is visibly, extremely impressed by Leslie's perfect deliverance of a public presentation despite her illness. Steve Kandell of New York magazine wrote: "This is obviously the moment when Ben’s begrudging respect for her becomes something else", and The Atlantic writer Scott Meslow wrote: "Parks and Recreation has allowed Ben to develop in the background so far, but his affection for Pawnee is clearly growing."

"Flu Season" also demonstrated a departure in the way Ann's romantic relationships were handled compared to past seasons. The character previously dated Andy Dwyer and Mark Brendanawicz (Paul Schneider), who was written out of the show at the end of the second season. In both cases, Ann was primarily in control of the relationship due to Andy's immaturity and Mark's lack of experience in long-term romances. Schur said of Ann's relationship with Chris, "This is the first time that Ann just completely loses herself and really falls for a guy super hard. And the relationship goes in a lot of funny, unexpected directions." Intimidated by her inability to find a flaw in the extremely positive and physically perfect Chris, Ann acts more awkwardly and nerdy around him than her character has been in the past. "Flu Season" also demonstrated deeper levels to Ron Swanson, who adamantly insists "I'm not interested in caring about people", yet reveals he cares about both Andy and April, and tries to help the two reconcile. Schur said Ron takes on a sort of father figure role, "and he ends up revealing in a tiny, tiny, tiny way that's still true to the character that he has genuine feelings of caring for the people who work around him in the Parks office".

== Cultural references ==
In the episode, Ben compares Leslie's delivery of a perfect presentation despite having the flu to basketball player Michael Jordan's showing during the 1997 NBA Finals. During the fifth game of the series, Jordan led the Chicago Bulls to victory despite suffering from a serious case of the flu. Ben also compares Leslie's speech to the famous home run baseball player Kirk Gibson hit off of pitcher Dennis Eckersley during the 1988 World Series, despite Gibson suffering from injuries to both legs at the time. While bonding, Ron and Andy discuss the draft history of the Indianapolis Colts, the NFL football team of Indiana. When Andy suggests Ron eat a burrito called the "Meat Tornado", Ron says, "You had me at Meat Tornado," a reference to the line "You had me at hello" from the romantic drama film Jerry Maguire (1996). While deluded by the flu, Leslie mistakenly refers to the chamber of commerce as the "Chamber of Secrets", a reference to the fantasy novel Harry Potter and the Chamber of Secrets. At one point, while practicing her speech delirious with the flu, Leslie turns to a wall poster and says, "Good evening everyone, I'm Leslie Monster and this is Nightline," a reference to the ABC newsmagazine program. Later, while still delirious, Leslie introduces Ben to the presentation audience as "Scott Bakula from Quantum Leap".

== Reception ==
=== Ratings ===
In its original American broadcast, "Flu Season" was seen by an estimated 5.83 million household viewers, according to Nielsen Media Research, with an overall 3.0 rating/8 share, and 3.2 rating/5 share among viewers between ages 18 and 49. It marked a six percent decline compared to the previous episode, "Go Big or Go Home", which itself was the highest overall Parks rating for since the premiere episode. The night "Flu Season" was broadcast, almost all of the comedy shows in NBC's Thursday lineup lost viewership compared to the prior week: while Community remained flat, Perfect Couples was down 19 percent, while The Office and 30 Rock were down 11 percent.

=== Reviews ===
The most recent installment of Parks and Rec showcased itself at its finest, giving each of its characters unforgettable moments to further prove that when it's on its game, it's [sic] is one of the finest comedies on television.

— Eric Sundermann, Hollywood.com

"Flu Season" received generally positive reviews, with many commentators praising the performance of Rob Lowe, whose character is usually physically fit to almost superhuman proportions but becomes extremely ill and hallucinatory when infected with the flu. Tim Goodman of The Hollywood Reporter said Lowe's character now seemed well-integrated into the cast, adding "If you've never believed Lowe can make you laugh out loud, pay attention to that episode." Steve Kandell of New York magazine said Lowe stole the show from the usual Parks powerhouses of Offerman and Pratt, and called one scene, when Lowe tries to will away his flu by yelling to himself in the mirror "Stop...pooping!", the "single greatest self-effacingly comic moment of his long, handsome career". The Atlantic writer Scott Meslow said after two episodes, the pairing of Chris and Ann was already more interesting than Ann's entire relationship with Mark Brendanawicz in the second season, and that the new romance subplot allowed the normally "straight (wo)man" Rashida Jones to display her comedic talents. Entertainment Weekly writer Hillary Busis said Chris "really came into his own" in the episode, and also said that Ann's relationship with Chris made her character more interesting and gave Jones greater comedic material to work with.

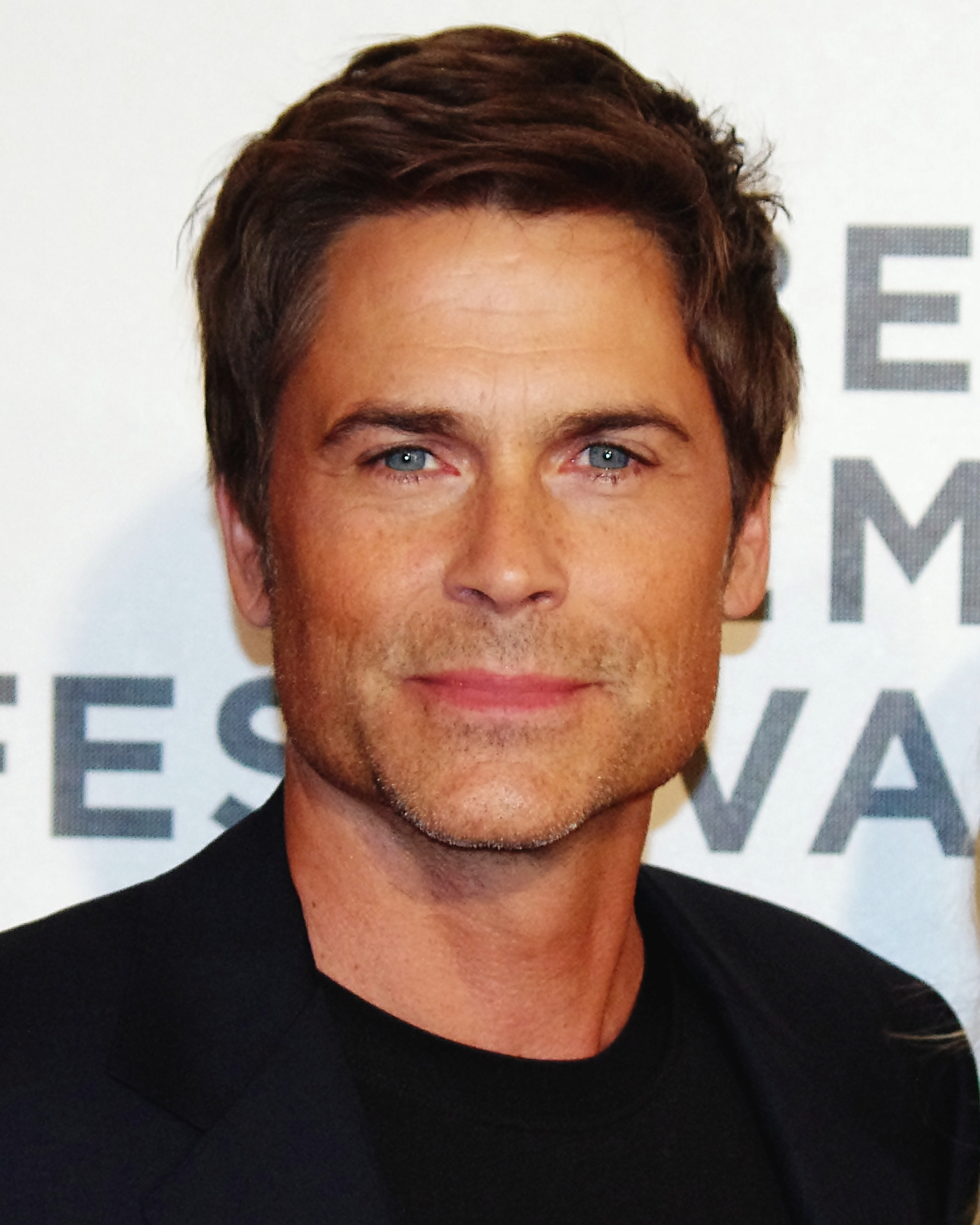
Rob Lowe (pictured) received particular praise from reviewers for his performance in "Flu Season".

HitFix writer Alan Sepinwall declared "Flu Season" the one episode he would suggest to newcomers seeking to become familiar with Parks and Recreation because it spotlights so many different characters, includes both warm and comedic moments, and includes commentary on small town government. He praised the performances of Lowe and Poehler, the latter of whom was especially effective because there were real stakes to Leslie making her presentation. Matt Fowler of IGN also said Lowe's character, which he feared would get old fast, had proven to be a strong asset to the show, and Ann's character was at her strongest opposite him. But Fowler also said "Flu Season" was a strong ensemble with great character moments for everyone, including Ron and Andy's bonding and Ben's admiration of Leslie. The A.V. Club writer Steve Heisler said "Flu Season" gave the entire cast the chance to be a bit sillier than usual and demonstrate their wide comedic ranges. Heisler said Ben and Chris felt like they belonged among the other characters, and he praised the performance of Aubrey Plaza, claiming April's character seemed more fleshed out than in past episodes.

Zap2it writer Rick Porter called "Flu Season" one of the best episodes of Parks and Recreation, particularly praising the "outstanding teamup" of Ron and the "different shades of Ann" displayed in the show. Porter said he simultaneously loved both Lowe's over-the-top performance while sick, and Poehler's more subtle performance. Matt Richenthal of TV Fanatic said the way Chris has become so well integrated into the show demonstrates how well the writers keep seemingly ridiculous characters grounded. Richenthal said Poehler made her sick scenes seem like strong character moments rather than just slapstick comedy, and praised the scenes with Ron and Andy, as well as Tom's scenes at the spa. Joel Keller of TV Squad said the episode strongly developed the characters Ben and Chris, and served as a showcase for the comedic talents of Poehler, who he complimented for not going too over the top. Hollywood.com writer Eric Sundermann said the episode showcased Parks and Recreation at its finest, and said both Poehler and Lowe gave some of their best performance to date. Sundermann praised the pairing of Offerman and Pratt, and said although he had reservations about a Ben and Leslie romance, he believed it got off to a charming start in "Flu Season".
