= Go Big or Go Home =

- Parks and Recreation episode
- Episode no.: Season 3 Episode 1
- Directed by: Dean Holland
- Written by: Alan Yang
- Original air date: January 20, 2011

Guest appearances
- Jason Boegh as Bartender; Dan Bridges as Donna's boss; Carter Edwards as Bobby; Karen Forman as Becky; Carlo Mendez as Eduardo; Natalie Morales as Lucy; Erame Okojie as Tim; David Trice as Jesse; Jama Williamson as Wendy Haverford

Episode chronology
← Previous "Freddy Spaghetti"	Next → "Flu Season"
- Parks and Recreation season 3

"Go Big or Go Home" is the third season premiere of the American comedy television series Parks and Recreation, and the 31st overall episode of the series. It originally aired on NBC in the United States on January 20, 2011. In the episode, Leslie gets Ann to go on a date with state auditor Chris to persuade him to increase the parks department budget. Meanwhile, Andy continues to harbor feelings for April, while a youth basketball game is ruined by Tom's jealousy over Ron dating his ex-wife Wendy.

The episode was written by Alan Yang and directed by Dean Holland. It was the first to feature Adam Scott, Rob Lowe, Jim O'Heir, and Retta as regular cast members rather than guest performers, as well as the first episode not to feature Paul Schneider in any capacity. Frequent guest stars Jama Williamson and Natalie Morales also reprised their roles. "Go Big or Go Home" marked the first original Parks and Recreation episode in eight months. It was filmed immediately after the second season concluded due to Amy Poehler's pregnancy, but NBC ended up placing the show on hold to accommodate their new series, Outsourced.

The season premiere was the first Parks and Recreation episode to air in its new 9:30 p.m. Thursday time-slot between the two popular shows The Office and 30 Rock. According to Nielsen Media Research, it was seen by 6.19 million households. It was the series' highest rating in the ages 18 to 49 demographic, and marked the highest overall viewership since the series premiere. The episode received highly positive reviews, with several commentators particularly praising the scene featuring the "Swanson Pyramid of Greatness", Ron Swanson's guide to successful living.

== Plot ==
After three months of closure due to the Pawnee budget crisis and government shutdown, Leslie excitedly informs her fellow employees that the parks department has been reopened, although on a shoestring budget. State auditors Chris and Ben announce they may only conduct existing park maintenance, but Leslie wants to offer better programs and services. Meanwhile, the always-optimistic Chris continues trying to convince Ann to go on a date with him. Ann finds him too intense, but Leslie convinces her to accept a date and try to persuade Chris to increase the parks budget.

Due to popular demand from citizens, Ben restarts the youth basketball league, although with only two teams. They are coached by Ron, who is extremely strict and disciplined with his players, and Andy, who is very laid back and lets his kids get out of control. Tom, who referees the game, becomes jealous when his ex-wife Wendy arrives to support Ron. Tom insists he is happy with his new girlfriend Lucy and does not mind that Wendy is dating Ron. However, Tom repeatedly calls false fouls against Ron's players until all of them are disqualified from the game. When Ron and Wendy get angry, Tom ejects them from the game and declares it a forfeit, which concerns Lucy.

Ann finds she enjoys her date with Chris. When she asks why he is always so positive, he explains he was expected to die as a baby due to a blood disorder, so he now feels fortunate to be alive every day. Leslie crashes the date to help Ann persuade Chris to increase the parks budget, but to her surprise, Ben also arrives, having predicted Leslie's plan. The four end up taking their date to a gay bar called The Bulge, where Chris tells Leslie he will consider increasing the parks budget. Leslie excitedly declares "mission accomplished", accidentally giving away her scheme and prompting Chris to leave, hurt that Ann had an ulterior motive for the date. Later, however, Ann apologizes to Chris and asks for another date, to which he happily agrees.

Meanwhile, April shows up to work after having disappeared three months earlier. Andy still has a crush on April, who previously liked Andy until she learned Ann had kissed him. Andy had been leaving messages for April ever since, but she did not return them because she was in Venezuela, where she met her new boyfriend, the handsome Eduardo. A discouraged Andy seeks advice from Leslie, who encourages him not to give up and to "go big or go home". Inspired by her own advice, Leslie proposes restoring the parks department with a Harvest Festival, which was once a Pawnee tradition until eliminated by budget cuts. Leslie and the other parks employees agree that if it is not a success, the parks department will shut down. Impressed by their enthusiasm, Chris and Ben agree to the idea.

== Production ==
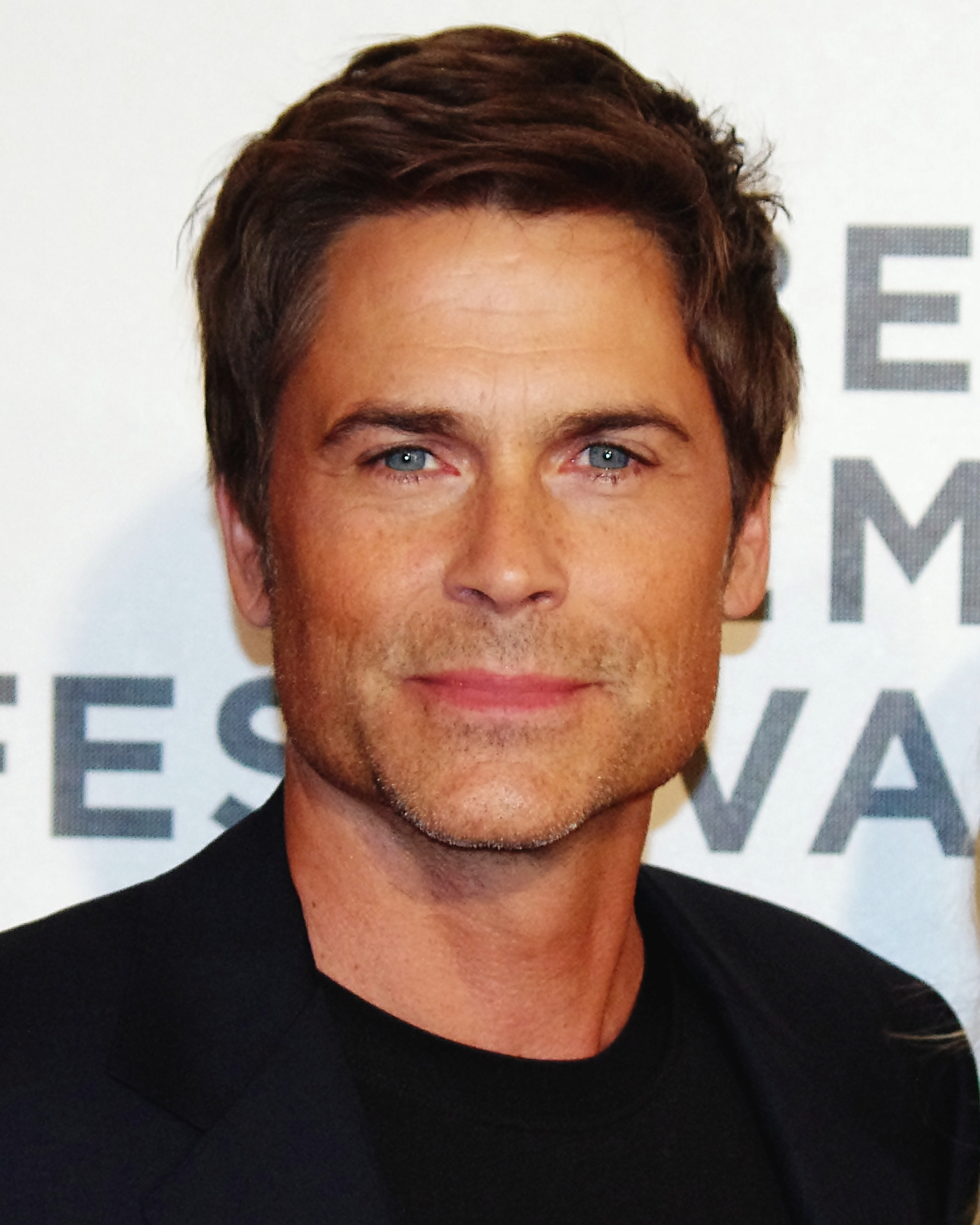
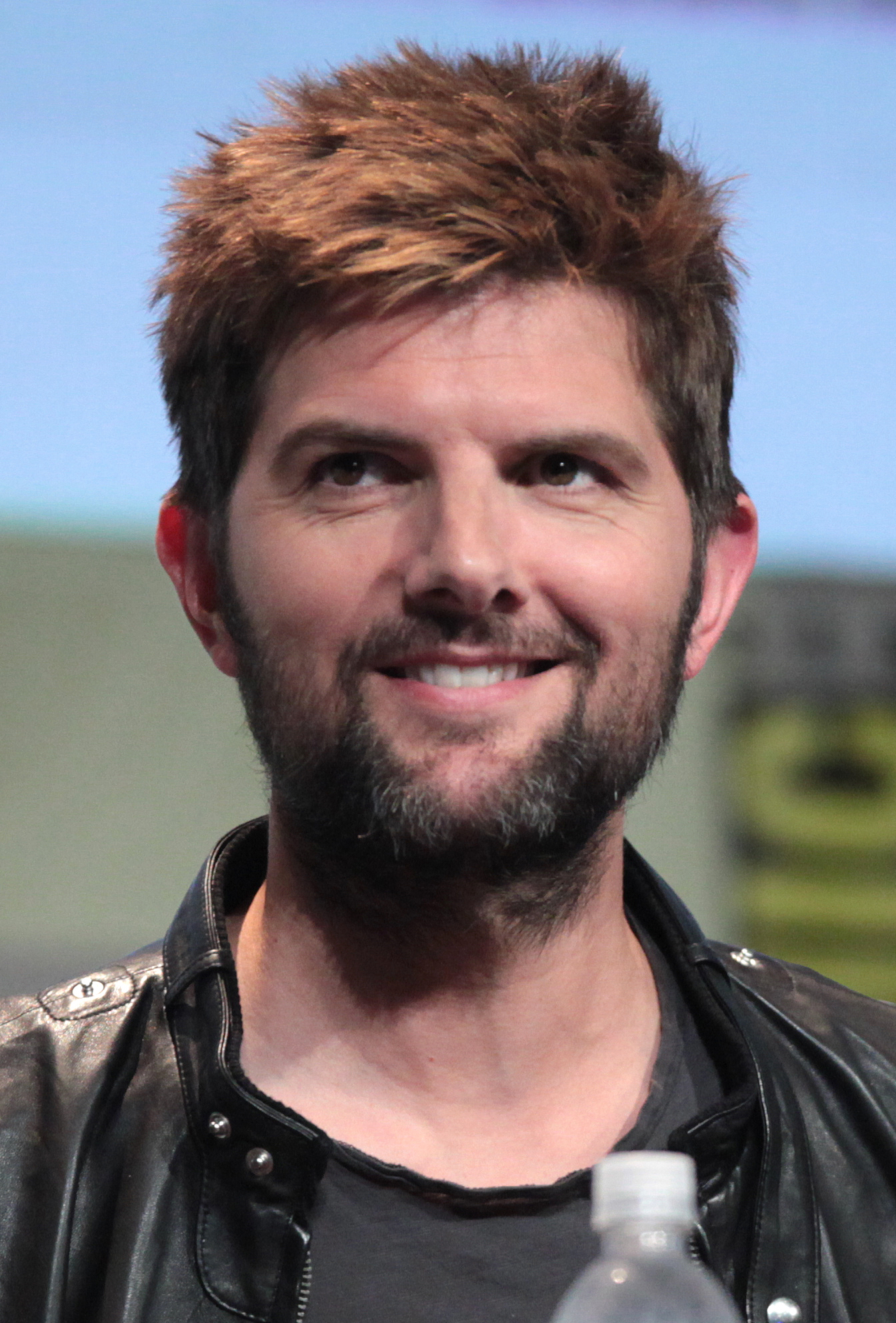
"Go Big or Go Home" was the first Parks and Recreation episode to feature Rob Lowe (left) and Adam Scott (right) as regular cast members rather than guest stars

"Go Big or Go Home", the third season premiere, was written by Alan Yang and directed by Dean Holland. It was the first to feature Adam Scott, Rob Lowe, Jim O'Heir, and Retta as regular cast members rather than guest stars. Frequent guest performers Jama Williamson and Natalie Morales also reprised their roles. The episode was originally expected to debut in September 2010 and, due to Amy Poehler's pregnancy, the Parks and Recreation producers decided to write and film the first six episodes of the season early so it could meet that air date. However, to accommodate their new comedy series Outsourced, NBC opted not to put Parks and Recreation on the fall schedule, and instead delayed the third season premiere to a mid-season date of January 20, 2011. Due to the delay, "Go Big or Go Home" is set in the fall, when it was supposed to air, rather than the winter when it was actually broadcast. NBC chief executive officer Jeff Gaspin said this move was not a reflection on Parks and Recreation, and suggested the extended hiatus would not only have no negative effect on the show, but could actually build anticipation for its return.

"Go Big or Go Home" was the first original episode since "Freddy Spaghetti" in May 2010, and executive producer Michael Schur said while he believed it was a strong episode, there were fears the hiatus would hurt the momentum of the series: "Of course, any time you're not on the air, you run the risk of people forgetting about you; that's the sad thing about the mid-season show." The week of the third season premiere, Amy Poehler said of the hiatus, "It was an NBC decision and certainly we were confused. But I think, weirdly, there's a momentum that comes from people waiting for us, which is nice." Poehler also said the long hiatus made an ironic sort of sense for the script, since at the beginning the characters have "taken too much time off and we've all gone a little crazy". While Parks and Recreation previously aired on 8:30 p.m. EST on Thursdays, "Go Big or Go Home" marked the first episode in a new 9:30 p.m. Thursday time-slot between the two popular shows The Office and 30 Rock. Poehler said of the time-slot, "'The Office' is such an amazing show and to be behind it is an honor." In anticipation of new viewers due to the Office lead-in, "Go Big and Go Home" included an introductory sequence describing the previous events of the series.

"Go Big or Go Home" introduced the subplot of restoring the parks department budget through a harvest festival, which continued to be a major story arc throughout the first seven episodes of the season. It also marked a major development in the romantic subplot between Ann and Chris. Rashida Jones said of her character: "I think women over-correct from their last boyfriends, and Chris is very much the opposite from Mark," a reference to Mark Brendanawicz, a character eliminated the previous season. During one scene at Ann's house, Leslie suggests outlandish and inappropriate ways for Ann to try to seduce Chris into increasing the parks department budget, including wearing a sleeveless tuxedo dress that suddenly bursts open. Amy Poehler said she and Jones improvised much of the scene. Poehler said of the scene, "I think it's really funny how little game (Leslie) has with guys. She's not a fool, it's just not her expertise, so when she talks about how to be sexy or hot to get someone's attention, it's always really crazy."

== Cultural references ==
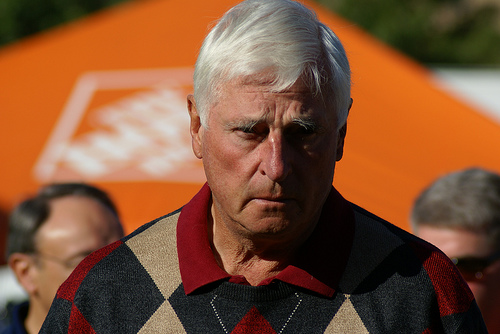
Ron Swanson's coaching style and temper is similar to that of basketball coach Bobby Knight (pictured), for whom Ron has professed respect in past episodes.

While coaching basketball, Ron Swanson shows his players what he calls the "Swanson Pyramid of Greatness", a guide to living similar to the "Pyramid of Success" used by John Wooden. The pyramid includes several different categories, with honor at the top, and others below it such as America, buffets, wood working, welfare avoidance and deer protein. A poster of this pyramid was included in promotional materials given to media in advance of the episode's broadcast, and images of it were later placed on the official Parks and Recreation website. During the basketball game, Ron wears a red sweater and, at one point, angrily throws a chair into the court. These are references to the basketball coach Bobby Knight, for whom Ron had professed great admiration in the pilot episode.

During scenes at the gay bar, a stylized stencil poster of Leslie hangs on the wall. It is designed in a similar way to the Barack Obama "Hope" poster designed by artist Shepard Fairey, with the word "Knope" instead of "Hope". This poster was previously featured in the second season premiere "Pawnee Zoo", where Leslie is praised as a gay rights hero for marrying two male penguins at a ceremonial wedding at the zoo. During the parks department shutdown, Tom gets a part-time job at Lady Foot Locker, a retail sportswear and footwear store. He wears the store uniform, which resembles a referee shirt, when he actually referees the youth basketball game later in the episode. Tom's part-time job is a reference to the second season episode "Woman of the Year", where it is revealed Tom's friend Jean-Ralphio Saperstein also worked at a Lady Foot Locker.

== Reception ==
=== Ratings ===
In its original American broadcast, "Go Big or Go Home" was seen by an estimated 6.19 million household viewers, according to Nielsen Media Research, with a 3.2 rating/8 share among viewers between ages 18 and 49. It marked the series' highest rating in that demographic, and the highest overall viewership since the series premiere episode from April 2009, which was seen by 6.77 million household viewers. "Go Big or Go Home" lost about a quarter of the viewership of the episode of The Office ("Ultimatum"), which was seen by 8.3 million households, but New York magazine described this as a "respectable drop-off" given the popularity of that series. Parks and Recreation received a higher rating in its time-slot than the CBS crime drama series CSI: Crime Scene Investigation, which had more viewers at 14.34 million households, but a lower 3.1 rating/8 share. Both shows were defeated by the Fox comedy-drama series Bones, which received a 6.5 rating/10 share and was seen by 10.55 million households.

=== Reviews ===
This show is being made as skillfully right right now as a half-hour comedy can be made. It has a large cast in which absolutely everyone is very funny, it has incorporated two new characters who already feel essential, and it's being written with effortless, upbeat joy that serves as a great reminder that while bittersweet comedy is a wonderful thing, not all great comedy has to have much bitter in it.

— Linda Holmes, NPR

"Go Big or Go Home" received critical acclaim, with several critics particularly complimenting the "Swanson Pyramid of Greatness" joke. HitFix writer Alan Sepinwall said the episode was effective in appealing to both new and old viewers, developing various character subplots and establishing the harvest festival story arc. He also praised the performances of Chris and Ann, which he called a far better and more interesting pairing than Ann with Mark Brendanawicz. Linda Holmes of NPR suggested the season premiere was a good place for newcomers to the series to start watching. She said all the characters were funny and the two new cast members had been seamlessly integrated into the show. Time magazine writer James Poniewozik called the episode an "excellent start" to the season, and said the harvest festival subplot would help better focus the series by giving the characters a single goal. Poniewozki said it also "reminds us that the show is about something: the idea, maybe quaint-seeming in this political climate, that civil servants can actually see themselves as servants and work in their community's interest". Damian Holbrook of TV Guide said "Go Big or Go Home" was an improvement on an already strong second season, claiming "the comedy seemed snappier, the relationships better grounded and the ensemble cast at their best."

CNN writer Henry Hanks praised the season premiere and said he was "overjoyed" that the show had returned. He found particularly funny the scenes at the start of the episode which showed the part-time jobs Tom, Donna and Jerry had during the parks department hiatus. Steve Heisler of The A.V. Club said "Go Big or Go Home" not only included many fun moments, but that the jokes felt "fresher and more rambunctious" than they had in the previous season, and that the shows seemed to have discovered "a newfound sense of purpose". Gail Pennington of the St. Louis Post-Dispatch said "Go Big and Go Home", along with the five other first episodes of the season "couldn't be funnier". The Hollywood Reporter writer Tim Goodman felt the episode was a strong start to the season, and particularly praised Rob Lowe, whose character he said was "really beginning to jell". Blogcritics writer Jerome Wetzel wrote, "I can't express in words how good it is to have Parks and Recreation back on television." Wetzel said the characters were so well defined that the show rivaled the ensemble cast of The Office, a comedy made by the same producers as Parks and Recreation. Zap2it writer Rick Porter wrote that Parks and Recreation "was one of the two or three funniest comedies on TV when it finished its second season, and it begins its third season having lost none of its mojo". He particularly praised the performances of Nick Offerman and Rob Lowe.

Matt Fowler of IGN said the episode was a pleasant way to return to the series, and was glad the harvest festival would give the characters something specific to focus on. However, Fowler felt there was a lack of closure over Tom's resentment in the episode of Ron dating Wendy. Joel Keller of TV Squad felt the new Chris and Ben characters served as a strong springboard into the third season, and that the premiere episode lived up to the anticipation caused by the show's long hiatus. However, Keller said Tom's continued pining for Wendy felt "a little protracted at this point". New York magazine writer Steve Kandell praised the episode and said the parks department employees taking drastic steps to save their department reflected Parks efforts to seek out higher ratings. Kandell, however, felt introducing Chris' tragic back story in the episode felt rushed. Eric Hochberger of TV Fanatic called the episode consistently funny, and said the new characters Ben and Chris were starting to hit their stride. However, Hochberger said Eduardo subplot felt like a contrived device to continue keeping April and Andy apart. Not all reviews were entirely positive. David Hinckley of New York Daily News called Parks and Recreation "a good show that could be a better show", claiming it falls short of other NBC comedies like 30 Rock. Hinckley cited the basketball game with Andy, Ron and Tom as a scene that feels too much like a sketch comedy bit rather than a natural progression of the script. Nick Purdy of Paste said the addition of new cast members Chris and Ben may have diluted the rest of the cast's talents, and that the episode felt as if it had "too many plates spinning", leaving not enough screentime for strong characters like April Ludgate and Ron Swanson.
