= Chris Traeger =

Fictional character from Parks and Recreation

- Parks and Recreation character
- Rob Lowe as Chris Traeger
- First appearance: "The Master Plan" (2010)
- Last appearance: "A Parks and Recreation Special" (2020)
- Portrayed by: Rob Lowe

In-universe information
- Nicknames: The Bionic Man; The Six Million Dollar Man; If I Had To Pick a Dude; Chris-toe-fur
- Occupation: Indiana State Auditor; Pawnee City Manager; University of Michigan Professor; Indiana University Director of Admissions
- Family: Unnamed stepbrother
- Spouse: Ann Perkins
- Significant others: Millicent Gergich (ex-girlfriend); Shauna Malwae-Tweep (ex-girlfriend); Jennifer Barkley (ex-lover)
- Children: Oliver Perkins-Traeger (son); Leslie Perkins-Traeger (daughter)

Christopher "Chris" Traeger is a fictional character played by Rob Lowe on the NBC comedy series Parks and Recreation. He began on the show as an Indiana State Auditor who visits the fictional city of Pawnee to help solve their crippling budget problems, and eventually becomes Pawnee's acting City Manager. Chris is an extremely positive person who is constantly upbeat and energetic. Scrupulously health-conscious, he exercises constantly and eats only healthy foods, hoping to be the first human to reach the age of 150.

Chris first appeared in the second season episode "The Master Plan." Originally expected to appear in eight episodes as a guest star, Lowe eventually signed on to remain on the show as a permanent cast member. Chris was a romantic interest for Ann Perkins (Rashida Jones) throughout the show's run. Chris imposes a strict policy against workplace dating at city hall, but series protagonist Leslie Knope (Amy Poehler) and Ben Wyatt (Adam Scott) begin secretly dating anyway, which Chris eventually accepts.

The idea of Chris as a State Auditor was inspired by real-life reports of government shutdowns during the 2008 financial crisis. The character has received highly positive reviews from critics, and has been described as "one of the great comedic creations of the past couple years" and "one of the funniest performances of Rob Lowe's career."

== Character biography ==
=== Background and personality ===
Chris Traeger begins the show as an auditor working for the Indiana state government in Indianapolis, but eventually becomes the acting city manager of Pawnee, the fictional Indiana city where Parks and Recreation is set. Originally from Wisconsin, he is an excessively positive and optimistic person, who is constantly upbeat and extremely energetic, it is also hinted in several episodes that he is a Buddhist. As a baby, Chris was diagnosed with a rare blood disorder and was not expected to live longer than three weeks, but miraculously survived. As a result, he sees every day he is alive as a gift, which results in his intensely cheerful and enthusiastic personality. He has a stepbrother who lives in London.

Chris is extremely health-conscious and exercises constantly; he runs 10 miles during his lunch break alone, and considers a 15 km run to be "light" exercise. He avoids eating red meat and fatty foods in favor of dishes like lean turkey burgers and vegetable loaf sweetened with fruit reduction, and takes a huge assortment of unusual vitamins. Chris always stays extremely well-hydrated, and as a result of his extreme exercise regimen has only 2.8% body fat, which makes him very susceptible to illness due to a weakened immune system. His ambition is to become the first human being to live 150 years. Chris always greets people with a firm handshake and direct eye contact, and to remember their names often points directly at people and repeats their names upon first meeting them. His constant desire to make everyone around him happy means Chris hates having to deliver bad news, a task he often assigns to his subordinates, usually Ben Wyatt. He often declares things to be "literally" the best thing he's ever seen or done, strongly emphasizing the word and pronouncing it "littrally". He is very specific about his needs, giving long, drawn out requests, often making only one point per sentence; in the episode "Ron & Tammy: Part Two", he orders a beer by saying, "I would like a local beer... I'd like it in a bottle... and I'd like that bottle to be cold."

=== Season two ===
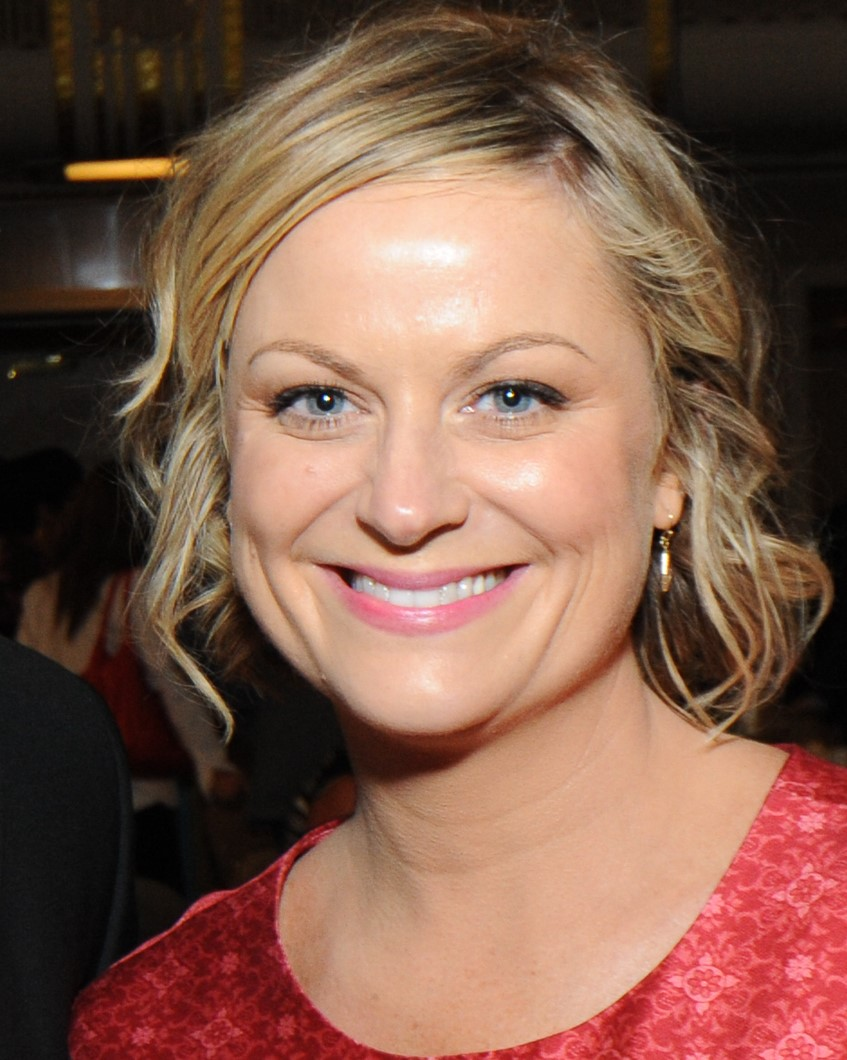
Chris Traeger's assignment to slash Pawnee budgets occasionally put him at odds with protagonist Leslie Knope (Amy Poehler, pictured).

Starting in the penultimate second season episode "The Master Plan", Chris Traeger and fellow state auditor Ben Wyatt (Adam Scott) are sent to Pawnee to help solve the city's crippling budget deficit. Despite the seriousness of the problems, Chris presents the situation in an extremely positive light and tries to make all the city hall employees around him happy, leaving the hard decisions and delivery of bad news up to Ben. Due to the poorly managed Pawnee government, Chris and Ben need to slash every city budget by up to 50 percent, much to the disappointment of deputy parks and recreation director Leslie Knope (Amy Poehler).

During an outing at a bar, Chris meets Leslie's best friend Ann Perkins (Rashida Jones), who is drunk and experiencing conflicting emotions following her recent breakup with Mark Brendanawicz (Paul Schneider). Ann makes out with Chris and, although she was too drunk to even remember the incident the next day, he develops romantic feelings for her. Ann rebuffs his requests for dates, and finds him too intense, but the ever-optimistic Chris does not become discouraged and insists he will continue courting her. Meanwhile, in "Freddy Spaghetti", Chris and Ben reveal Pawnee's budget problems are worse than anticipated, which would require the government to be temporarily shut down, much to the horror of Leslie, but the delight of parks and recreation director Ron Swanson (Nick Offerman), an anti-government libertarian. Chris and Ben even consider firing Leslie to save money, but Ron persuades them otherwise.

=== Season three ===
In "Go Big or Go Home", after three months of closure, the Pawnee government reopens in a limited capacity, but Chris and Ben insist the parks and recreation department's budget can only sustain existing park maintenance. Leslie, however, wants to offer better programs and services for the Pawnee citizens. She asks Ann to go on a date with Chris, then try to convince him to increase the budget. Ann reluctantly agrees to the plan, but as the date progresses, she finds she actually enjoys herself and develops feelings for Chris. When Leslie accidentally gives away her secret plan, Chris is hurt and disparaged by Ann's ulterior motive. The next day, however, Ann apologizes and asks to continue dating Chris, who happily accepts.

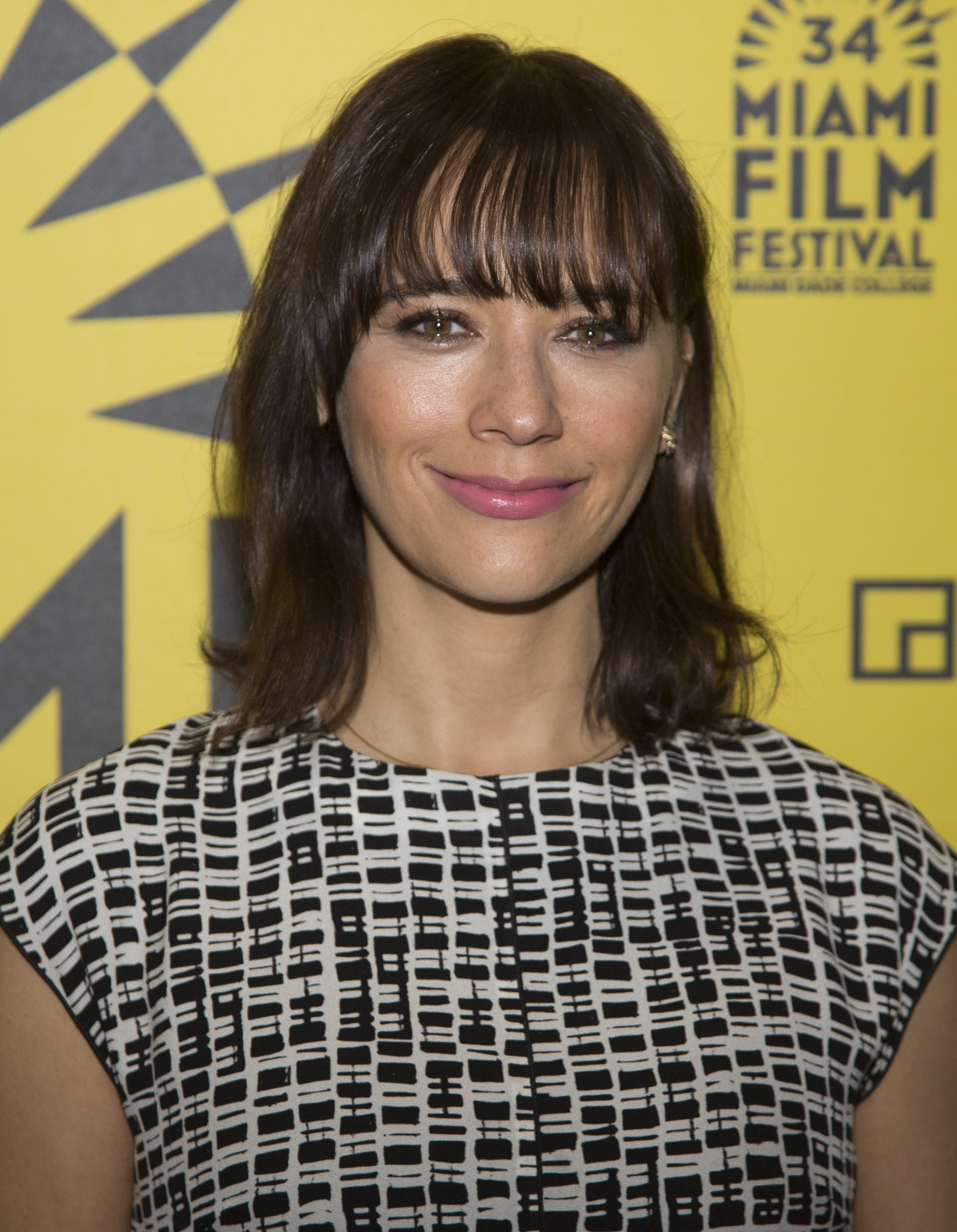
Chris was a romantic interest to Ann Perkins (Rashida Jones, pictured) for much of the third season.

Ann finds she likes Chris very much, but is intimidated because she cannot find a single flaw with him, which causes her to act socially awkwardly around him. However, when a flu outbreak strikes Pawnee in "Flu Season", Chris becomes severely ill, as due to his extreme workout regimen, he has a poor immune system and low body fat. He suffers a complete physical breakdown and becomes delirious from fever, which causes Ann (who works as a local nurse and treats his illness) to feel less intimidated by him. Later, when he recovers, Chris and Ben are called back to Indianapolis for another assignment, but Chris requests an extension to stay in Pawnee, seemingly due to his feelings for Ann.

In "Ron & Tammy: Part Two", Ann begins to question why Chris has not asked her to move with him to Indianapolis when he eventually returns there, especially after he offers for Ron's assistant April Ludgate (Aubrey Plaza) to come there to work for him. After Ann insists they need to decide what their future holds, Chris breaks up with Ann. However, he does so in such a positive and upbeat way that she does not actually realize they have broken up. When Chris returns to Indianapolis, Ann becomes confused about why they have had such little contact and suspects he is cheating on her. In the episode "Indianapolis", Ann confronts Chris about her suspicions, only to become humiliated to learn he had actually intended to break up with her.

In the episode "Camping" a few months later, Chris returns to Pawnee to work as acting city manager after former manager Paul Iaresco (Phil Reeves) suffers a major heart attack. A still devastated Ann meets with him to try and clear the air. However, Chris is once again so optimistic while discussing their break-up that she falsely believes they have gotten back together and tries to kiss him, thus embarrassing herself further. Meanwhile, Chris offers Ben a full-time job working at the Pawnee government, which Ben accepts.

Chris proves to be an energetic city manager, encouraging Leslie to pursue ambitious, grand-scale projects like the harvest festival she organized before he returned to Pawnee. In "Soulmates", he also attempts to combat Pawnee's notorious obesity problem by enacting a government-wide health initiative. In that same episode, when he sees Leslie kiss fellow employee Tom Haverford (Aziz Ansari) and falsely believes they are dating, Chris warns her he maintains a strict policy against workforce dating and insists she could be fired if she engages such a relationship. He is unaware, however, that Leslie and Ben actually have romantic feelings for each other, and eventually start dating without his knowledge.

During the season finale "Li'l Sebastian", Chris learns he has tendinitis. Although it is not particularly serious, it terrifies the health-conscious Chris and makes him begin to ponder his own mortality. He is eventually comforted by Ann, who now works part-time at city hall as the health department's public relations director. Chris feels better and appears to begin developing feelings again for her.

=== Season four ===
In "Ron and Tammys", Chris helps Ann shoot a health-related PSA. His determination to make it perfect, filming take after take, reminds Ann of some of her reasons not to date him. In "Pawnee Rangers", Chris meets Jerry's daughter Millicent (Sarah Wright). The two start dating and Chris makes sure that it is okay with Jerry. Jerry says that he is fine with the two of them dating, much to Chris' delight. Chris and Millicent go together to April and Andy's Halloween party, with Chris dressing as Sherlock Holmes, his favorite character. After Chris starts to lose contact with Millie, he enlists Jerry, Donna, and Ann to help him, against Jerry's wishes. Donna tells him that he is too accessible and needs to back off a little bit so he can continue dating Millie. In "Bowling for Votes", Millie dumps Chris, leaving him depressed. In "Operation Ann", Leslie convinces Chris that he is still a likable person and that Millicent's opinion does not mean anything. He immediately loses his depression. In "Dave Returns", Chris discovers Tom's relationship with Ann and confronts Tom about it, making Chris realize that he has to "...adjust." He then freezes and stares sadly into space. In the same episode, when Andy asks Chris to sing for him (since he is working as a backing vocalist on Andy's song for the campaign), he sings "Take Me Out to the Ball Game" out of tune and with the wrong lyrics, causing everyone else there to wince. Chris helps Leslie's campaign however he can, even taking on a large amount of busy work to distract him from his loneliness "Bus Tour". He has a brief liaison with Bobby Newport's campaign manager, which cheers him up.

=== Season five ===
In season five, Chris is still working as Pawnee's City Manager. He is no longer depressed, but is continuously seeing a therapist. He is also asked to be the father of Ann Perkins' child via in vitro fertilization. He is hesitant at first and turns to Ben and others to help him make a decision. After "Bailout", he tells Ann that he will be the father and the two begin parenting compatibility testing to see how well they will work together with raising a child. During "Jerry's Retirement", they get back together but Ann is not sure if they should continue their relationship the way they are now.

=== Season six ===
With Ann pregnant at the beginning of season six, Chris is preparing to be a father. In addition, when Ann expresses interest in leaving Pawnee to be closer to her family in Michigan, Chris decides to go with her. Some time after the pair leaves, Ann gives birth to their son Oliver Perkins-Traeger.

=== Season seven ===
Chris and Ann, now married, return for a guest appearance in the series finale in order to advise Leslie in 2025. It is revealed that after Oliver, the couple had a second child, a daughter named Leslie.

== Development ==
What I love about Chris Traeger is his unrelenting enthusiasm. He is the most positive person in the world. And he is also very, very intense and specific. So whether he's ordering how he would like his water or describing the kind of colors he wants on a graph, everything means the world to him.

— Rob Lowe

Shortly following his departure from the ABC drama series Brothers & Sisters, Rob Lowe accepted the role of Chris Traeger on Parks and Recreation. He made his first appearance on the show in "The Master Plan", the penultimate episode of the second season. The character debuted the same episode that Adam Scott began his role as Ben Wyatt. Originally, Chris Traeger was only meant to be a guest role, with Lowe portraying him in the final two episodes of the second season and the first six episodes of the third season before departing the series. However, Lowe instead became a regular cast member starting with the third season, and signed a multi-year contract to remain on the show. The idea of Chris as a state auditor visiting Pawnee, and the subsequent government shutdown, was inspired by news reports at the time of a number of states that were considering a shut down of schools, parks and other services due to the 2008 financial crisis.

Parks and Recreation co-creator Michael Schur said Chris' habit of pointing directly into the faces of people he meets and repeating their names was one of the first elements of his character that the writing staff conceived. Chris' desire to live 150 years was inspired by Schur's wife, J. J. Philbin, who had read an article which stated that scientists believe the first human who will live 150 years has already been born, and felt it applied to the Chris Traeger character. Lowe's first day of filming on the series was his birthday (March 17, 2010), which was the day his kiss scene with Rashida Jones in "The Master Plan" was shot. Lowe said he loved his character's "unrelenting enthusiasm" and the fact that he is not a romantic lead, but rather a "big, fat nerd". Parks and Recreation star Amy Poehler said of Chris Traeger: "It's a really fun character to play against because what you’ll see start to happen is Chris doesn’t want to deliver any bad news, but he’s actually like the Bad News Bear." Like much of the rest of the cast, Lowe occasionally improvises lines and actions for his character that are not included in the script. The writers hoped to use Ann Perkins' breakup with Chris, and the drastic changes in her behavior afterward, as a way of tapping into more comedic potential of her character rather than having her fill the role of straight man as she had in the past. Schur said: "Ann is a very intelligent and attractive woman, and it's hard to knock someone like that off balance. And the way to knock that person off balance is to get Rob Lowe in a relationship with you."

Once Lowe joined the permanent cast, Chris' role changed into more of an authority figure concerned with integrity and efficiency, although he continued to maintain his positive attitude and personality. Schur said of this second role: "He doesn’t like frayed ends or controversies – he wants the body politic to be as clean-running and organic as his own human body. Part of the design of the character was to give the other characters a true boss – an actual authority figure whose rules and regulations meant they had to toe certain lines, even while his endlessly cheery disposition made it hard to argue with him." As a result, Chris Traeger changed in minor ways once he became a regular character. In his earlier episodes, Chris avoided associating himself with anything negative and constantly made Ben report bad news to people. As city manager in later episodes as a regular, however, Chris started imposing rules or changes around the office that were not popular and seemed less resistant about enforcing them. For example, Chris began to enforce his strict no-dating policy around city hall. Additionally, in the episode "Jerry's Painting", Chris forcefully orders Leslie to destroy a painting when it proves to be controversial, and becomes angry with her when she tries to resist those orders.

== Reception ==
I knew going into his stint on the show that Rob Lowe can be funny, but this may be the most I've ever enjoyed him. They've moved Chris right up to the edge of cartoon and Lowe is embracing that with his goofy running style and his shameless pandering whenever Chris has to pass the baton to bad cop Ben.

— television critic Alan Sepinwall

The Chris Traeger character has received critical acclaim. Rick Porter of Zap2it described him as "one of the great comedic creations of the past couple years", and Hitfix writer Alan Sepinwall called it "one of the funniest performances of [Rob Lowe's] career". David Hinckley of the New York Daily News said both Lowe and Adam Scott were excellent additions to the cast, and Eric Sundermann of Hollywood.com said Chris was "exactly what the show needed to push itself to another level of silliness". Some reviewers believed Chris' over-the-top personality would be funny in the short run, but that the character would not prove three-dimensional enough to have long-term sustainability. New York magazine writer Steve Kandell initially described him as "funny, but sorta one-note", and Eric Hochberger of TV Fanatic first found Chris funny, but likewise said he was "not sure how great he'll be long term". Matt Fowler of IGN expressed the same sentiments after earlier episodes, but by the third season said Chris proved to be a great addition to the show.

The relationship between Chris and Ann was described by Sundermann as "one of the most interesting parts of the show and the reason, specifically, is Chris". Likewise, Porter said Lowe and Rashida Jones had developed a "fantastic dynamic". Joel Keller of TV Squad said he found Chris "a little two-dimensional", and believed the relationship was poorly handled because it made Ann too passive. Lowe received particularly strong praise for his role in "Flu Season", in which Chris became extremely ill and hallucinatory when infected with the flu. Tim Goodman of The Hollywood Reporter said Lowe's character seemed well-integrated into the cast by the episode "Flu Season", and added "If you've never believed Lowe can make you laugh out loud, pay attention to that episode." Steve Kandell said Lowe stole the show from the usual Parks powerhouses of Nick Offerman and Chris Pratt, and called one scene, when Lowe tries to will away his flu by yelling to himself in the mirror "Stop...pooping!", the "single greatest self-effacingly comic moment of his long, handsome career".

Parks and Recreation traditionally experienced poor Nielsen ratings, and NBC officials hoped the addition of Lowe to the cast would help increase viewership. His premiere on the second-season episode "The Master Plan" was heavily publicized in commercials with the hopes of drawing new viewers. However, ratings continued to be low after he joined the show, and his appearances only resulted in what HitFix writer Daniel Fienberg called "a statistically irrelevant bump" in the ratings.

Following actor Charlie Sheen's departure from the CBS comedy series Two and a Half Men in March 2011, rumors began to circulate that Rob Lowe might leave Parks and Recreation to take Sheen's place on that show. People magazine reported that Two and a Half Men creator Chuck Lorre was "seriously discussing the possibility" of signing Lowe, and Sheen himself said he would be a "fabulous" successor. Those rumors proved unfounded, however, and were flatly denied by Michael Schur, who called it "complete gibberish". Although widely considered a supporting role, Lowe's performance as Chris Traeger was submitted for a 2011 Primetime Emmy Award in the Outstanding Lead Actor in a Comedy Series category.
