= Freddy Spaghetti =

- Parks and Recreation episode
- Episode no.: Season 2 Episode 24
- Directed by: Jason Woliner
- Written by: Daniel J. Goor
- Original air date: May 20, 2010

Guest appearances
- Rob Lowe as Chris Traeger; Adam Scott as Ben Wyatt; Marcus Folmar as Marcus; Brian McCann as Freddy Spaghetti; Nicole Pettis as Paula; Natalie Morales as Lucy; Julia Silverman as Florence; Guy Stevenson as Guy; Cooper Thornton as Dr. Harris; Jama Williamson as Wendy Haverford

Episode chronology
← Previous "The Master Plan"	Next → "Go Big or Go Home"
- Parks and Recreation season 2

"Freddy Spaghetti" is the second season finale of the American comedy television series Parks and Recreation, and the 30th overall episode of the series. It originally aired on NBC in the United States on May 20, 2010. In the episode, as Ron helps state auditors make governmental cuts amid a government shutdown, Leslie tries to save a children's concert starring musician Freddy Spaghetti. Meanwhile, Andy asks April to be his girlfriend, while Ann tries to cope with her renewed feelings for Andy following her breakup with Mark.

The episode was written by Daniel J. Goor and directed by Jason Woliner. "Freddy Spaghetti" featured the second performances of Adam Scott and Rob Lowe as two state auditors sent to help Pawnee through its budget crisis, as well as the second appearance by Natalie Morales as Tom's girlfriend Lucy. Jama Williamson reprised her recurring guest role as Tom's ex-wife Wendy, and comedian and writer Brian McCann portrayed Freddy Spaghetti.

"Freddy Spaghetti" marked the final performance for Paul Schneider playing Mark Brendanawicz, and also the last time anyone on the show mentioned him in any capacity. The final scene between Mark and Leslie, sitting on a bench together at a lot Leslie hopes to turn into a park, mirrored their scenes together in the first season finale "Rock Show". "Freddy Spaghetti" was also a turning point in the romantic subplot between Andy and April, who share their first kiss in the episode.

According to Nielsen Media Research, "Freddy Spaghetti" was seen by 4.55 million household viewers, a five percent increase in viewership compared to the previous episode, "The Master Plan". The episode received generally positive reviews, with many commentators calling it a strong ending to an excellent season. "Freddy Spaghetti" and the rest of the second season of Parks and Recreation was released on DVD in the United States on November 30, 2010, which included an extended 26-minute "producer's cut" of the episode.

== Plot ==
The Pawnee government has shut down due to a budget crisis. When Leslie explains at a town meeting that a family concert featuring children's entertainer Freddy Spaghetti must be cancelled due to the shutdown, the citizens are outraged. Leslie visits state auditors Chris and Ben seeking a way to still have the concert, but Ben insists there is simply no money for it. When Leslie goes to city planner Mark to vent about her situation and seek help, she is stunned to learn that he has taken a buyout and plans to join a construction company, as he tells the camera that the combination of Ann breaking up with him, the government shutdown, and a bird going to the bathroom on him made it clear it was time for him to move on; she angrily calls him "Mark Brendana-Quits". Meanwhile, Ann is struggling with her redeveloping feelings for her ex-boyfriend Andy. Later, Ann suggests to Leslie she should hold the concert at Lot 48, as it is not a park and therefore not shut down. Meanwhile, April and Andy finally reveal their feelings to each other, but April still rejects him, believing Andy still has feelings for Ann.

Meanwhile, Ron has been assigned to a task force to help fix the city's budget problem. A small government advocate, Ron is delighted at the prospect of deep municipal cuts, gloating and chanting at the cuts Chris and Ben propose, but when he learns the auditors plan to fire Leslie, Ron refuses and offers his job instead. In explaining her dedication, Ron accidentally alerts them about the Freddy Spaghetti concert. Chris and Ben arrive to the concert to shut it down, but Leslie tells them everything has been donated and nothing is on the taxpayer's dime. However, Leslie learns Freddy Spaghetti has booked another gig. She asks Andy to play instead, but he is hit by a car while driving his new motorcycle home to retrieve his guitar, breaking his right arm. Just as the concert begins, Freddy Spaghetti surprisingly arrives, having been paid by Ben to perform at Leslie's concert. Ben explains he is not a bad person, but the budget still has to be slashed.

Visiting Andy in the hospital, Ann suddenly kisses him, but immediately stops and guiltily walks out. Later, April, also relieved to see Andy is fine, finally agrees to go out with him. After they kiss, Andy decides to be honest and tells her about the earlier kiss with Ann. April angrily storms out, taking back her decision to go out with him. That night, Leslie sits on a bench in the empty Lot 48 and Mark joins her, with both appearing happy to be able to talk to each other. Mark tells her that if more people like her worked in local government, he wouldn't be leaving, and gives her plans he drew up for a park at Lot 48 before giving her a goodbye kiss on the cheek and walking away forever. The next day, Ron withdraws from the budget task force and appoints Leslie in his place. As Tom and his new girlfriend Lucy are clearing out his office, he notices Ron is wearing a red shirt and black pants, the "Tiger Woods" outfit he always wears the day after having sex. Tom's ex-wife Wendy then appears and kisses Ron and the two leave together, shocking Tom.

== Production ==
=== Writing ===
"Freddy Spaghetti" was written by Daniel J. Goor, who previously penned the episodes "The Reporter", "Hunting Trip" and "Leslie's House". The idea of state auditors visiting Pawnee, and the subsequent government shutdown there, was conceived from news reports at the time of a number of states considering shutting down schools, parks and other services due to the global recession. During an interview with the Los Angeles Times, Parks and Recreation co-creator Michael Schur cited stories about Kansas City closing down a great number of their public schools, and Idaho threatening to shut down the state parks department. In that interview, he said, "The entire state of Idaho was threatening to shut down the Parks department, and Idaho is essentially just one large park." That line, almost verbatim, was used in the script when Ben explained to Leslie the seriousness of the economic recession around the nation.

Schur said the writing staff had difficulty scripting the scene where Ann kisses Andy: "We had a lot of discussions about this because we didn't want Ann to be too much of a jerk and kiss a guy who likes another girl, and we didn't want Andy to be too much of a jerk because he likes April. It was very delicate." The episode marked a turning point for the romantic subplot between April and Andy, who shared their first kiss of the series in "Freddy Spaghetti". Goor said filming of that scene, "They nailed the kiss immediately." While trying to get April to talk to him, Andy pretends he doesn't want to talk to her at all, which he incorrectly calls "reverse psychiatry" instead of reverse psychology. This line was improvised by Chris Pratt.

=== Casting ===
"Freddy Spaghetti" was the final episode to include Paul Schneider in any capacity after his two seasons as regular cast member as Mark Brendanawicz. Schneider left the series, and though Schur claimed that both the producers and Schneider were interested in having him return for guest appearances in future episodes, Schneider stated that he was not interested in returning and had never been contacted about it. The final scene between Leslie and Mark in "Freddy Spaghetti", in which the two sit together at Lot 48, mirrors their scenes together in the first season finale, "Rock Show", in which the two shared a kiss while overlooking the lot while it was still a construction pit. Schur said of the scene, "It's great because Leslie and Mark, it was such a disastrous moment last time (at the pit) and he didn't really respect her, and a lot's happened in a year." Goor said of using that setting, "I liked the symmetry of having it play a critical, and opposite role in this finale. Last year, they sat on the bench and kissed, and it seemed like they might be getting back together. This year, they sat on the bench and Mark kissed Leslie goodbye." The bench they sit in during that scene is the same one they sat on during their kiss scene in "Rock Show". Throughout the second season, that bench was in Leslie's office. Schur said, "We decided that in the reality of the show she brought it to the lot for this moment. It's a little bit of a stretch, but, you know."

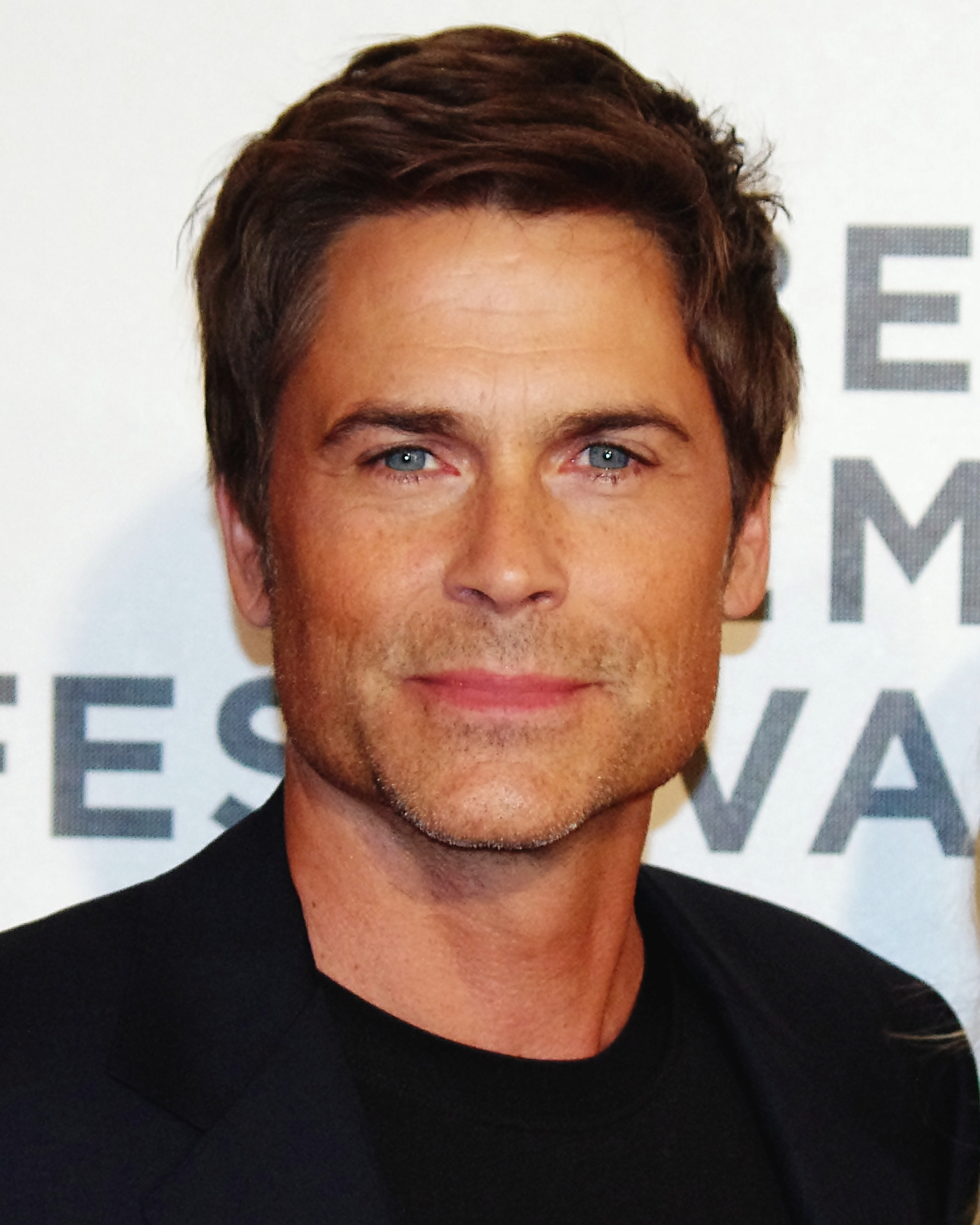
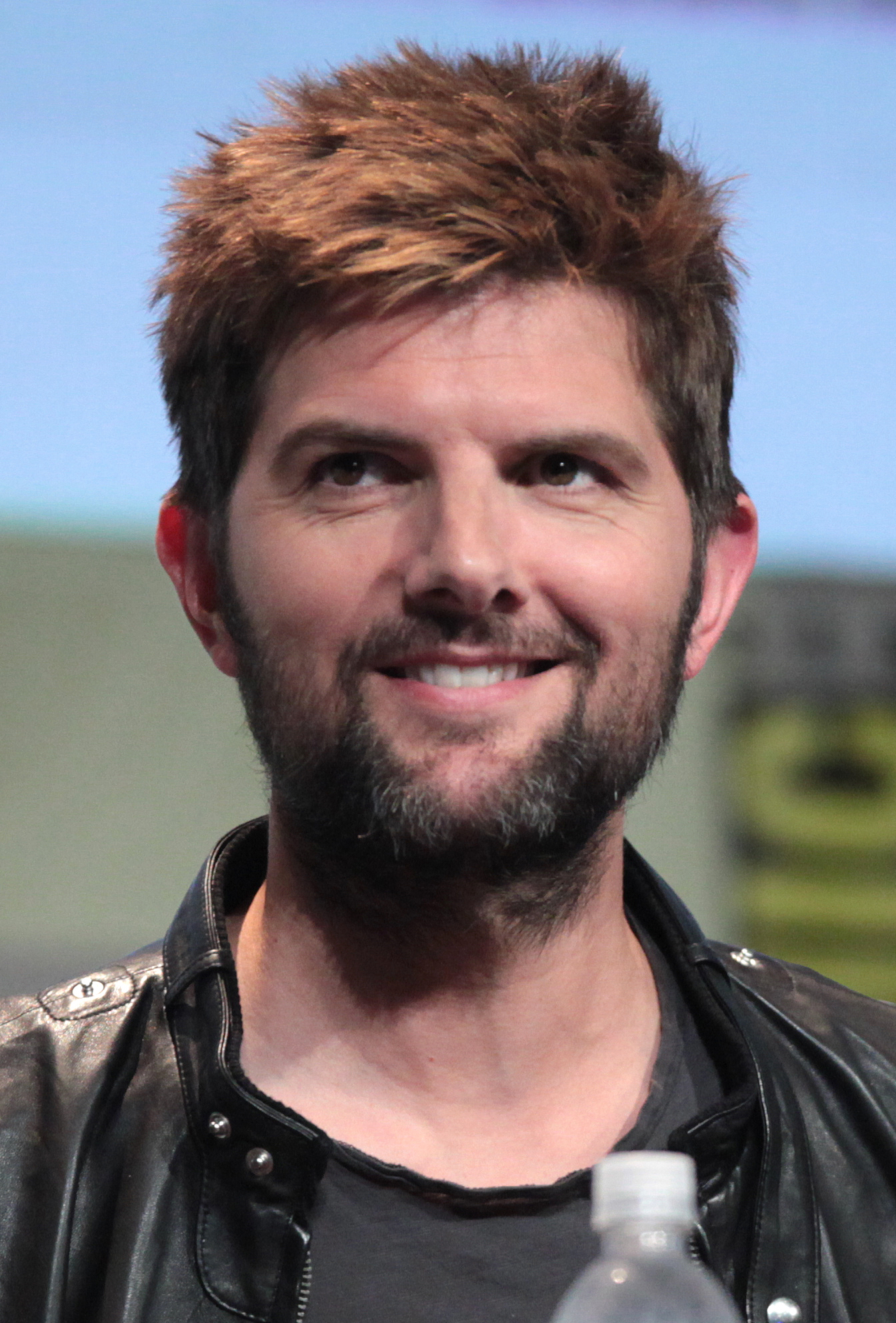
Rob Lowe (left) and Adam Scott (right) joined the cast of Parks and Recreation during the last two episodes of the second season.

"Freddy Spaghetti" marked the second appearances by Adam Scott and Rob Lowe as state auditors sent to solve Pawnee's budget problems. Lowe's Chris Traeger character is energetic, eccentric and overly cheerful, whereas Scott's Ben Wyatt is more pragmatic and realistic. Scott was always intended to become a regular cast member starting in the third season, while Lowe was originally expected to appear only in a few more episodes in a guest role. However, after those episodes were filmed, Lowe later joined the show as a regular cast member. Lowe improvised many aspects of his character, including when he handed Ben a water bottle and said, "You should hydrate," and when he clapped after Leslie sang at the concert, "If you're happy and you know it, clap your hands." Additionally, the episode was the second appearance of Natalie Morales as Lucy, a Pawnee bartender and romantic interest for Tom. "Freddy Spaghetti" also included appearances by recurring guest stars Jama Williamson, who plays Tom Haverford's ex-wife Wendy, and Cooper Thornton, who plays the sarcastic and deadpan Dr. Harris, who tended to Andy's broken arm. Comedian and writer Brian McCann portrayed Freddy Spaghetti himself in the episode. While singing at the concert, McCann improvised a great deal of non-child-friendly dialogue that could not be used in the final episode. Among them were a song about how he pays too much alimony to his wife, and another about meeting all the children's mothers backstage after the show. Guy Stevenson, a MADtv writer and friend of Parks and Recreation cast member Retta, played the man who shouted during a municipal meeting, "With the government shut down, who's going to stop Al-Qaeda?"

=== Filming ===
The episode was directed by Jason Woliner, who previously directed the Parks and Recreation episodes "Beauty Pageant" and "Woman of the Year". The idea of Andy injuring himself in a motorcycle accident was conceived early in the filming of the second season by Chris Pratt. Pratt suggested that a stunt involving Andy crashing a motorcycle would be very funny. Bucaro, Pratt's stunt double, filmed two takes of the crash in "Freddy Spaghetti", and the first take was used in the final episode. At the beginning of the episode, while roller-skating through the corridors of city hall, Andy unsuccessfully tries to jump over a desk and falls violently to the ground. Unlike the motorcycle crash, Pratt performed that stunt himself, and had to film about six takes of it.

During one scene, Ron slips and falls on the grass while running to warn Leslie about Ben's plan to shut down the Freddy Spaghetti concert. That fall was neither scripted nor accidental, but rather planned and improvised by Nick Offerman. Aziz Ansari described the physical comedy as "one of my favorite shots in the series". In a different scene, April is chewing on a hay-straw while raking hay before the concert, and angrily spits the straw out when Andy tries to talk to her. That moment was improvised by actress Aubrey Plaza. Woliner asked her not to do it, but she insisted, correctly predicting it would make the final cut if she did it. In a different scene, Ron eats a turkey leg wrapped in bacon. The original script called simply for a large turkey leg, but a props employee suggested wrapping it in bacon based on Ron's well-known affinity for the food. It was Woliner who suggested that Ron say the snack was nicknamed "the Swanson".

== Cultural references ==
During one scene, Leslie visits Tom at home, only to find him wearing a robe and entertaining Lucy. Tom insists he is about to have sex, explaining, "Why else would Boyz II Men's "On Bended Knee" be playing right now?", referring to a song in the background. The line was improvised by Aziz Ansari and, originally, the song was not playing, but Michael Schur said the line was so funny that he successfully sought permission to use the song and added it to the background in post-production. At the Freddy Spaghetti concert, Leslie asks a little girl which song was her favorite, to which she replies "Penne and the Jets", a pasta-inspired version of the Elton John song "Benny and the Jets". This line was thought of by Amy Poehler.

While packing his office at the end of the episode, Tom frantically looks for his autographed photo of actor Jamie Foxx. Ansari said he had been trying to work a reference to Foxx into the show for months. Tom's observation that Ron always dresses like golf pro Tiger Woods after having sex was a joke previously used in the episode "Ron and Tammy". The original joke was written before the story of Woods' extramarital affairs scandal broke in the news in November 2009. "Freddy Spaghetti" included a reference to the previous episode "Galentine's Day", in which Andy discussed a song he wrote called "Sex Hair", about how one could tell someone had sex based on how matted their hair is. In the season finale, Andy rewrites the song to be called "Pickle Hair" so it can be played at the kid-friendly concert.

== Reception ==
In its original American broadcast, "Freddy Spaghetti" was seen by an estimated 4.55 million household viewers, according to Nielsen Media Research, with a 2.1 rating/7 share among viewers between ages 18 and 49. It marked a five percent increase in viewership compared to the previous episode, "The Master Plan", which itself had increased in the ratings compared to the previous week. "Freddy Spaghetti" also had a higher rating than the first season finale, "Rock Show". Parks and Recreation ranked second in its timeslot with "Freddy Spaghetti", behind the fifth season finale of the Fox crime drama Bones, but higher than the tenth season finale of the CBS crime drama CSI: Crime Scene Investigation and an episode of the ABC science-fiction drama FlashForward.

"Freddy Spaghetti" received generally positive reviews. Leonard Pierce of The A.V. Club felt the script balanced all the character subplots extremely well, writing, "It's this ability to hold down the 'situation' part of situation comedy, while never scrimping on the comedy, that makes it the class of the NBC lineup—the purest, if not the best, sitcom on the air." Pierce also complimented the final scene between Leslie and Mark, which he said brought the season to "a touching full circle". IGN writer Matt Fowler ranked the episode as "outstanding" and claimed it highlighted the strengths of Leslie, by emphasizing the passion with which she views her job, and Ron, by showing how much he cares for his employees even though he hates his job. Fowler said Schneider's departure was handled well, even though he described Mark as the show's least interesting character. HitFix writer Alan Sepinwall said "Freddy Spaghetti" did a good job of bringing closure to the season and starting new storylines regarding Pawnee's budget problems. Sepinwall praised the chemistry between Poehler and Scott, as well as Lowe's comedic performance, but said the April and Andy romantic subplot was less consistently effective than the similar pairing between Jim and Pam Halpert on the NBC comedy The Office.

New York magazine writer Steve Kendell said, "The finale was as on point as any episode this year—smart, funny, crisply written, and poignant." Kandell said Mark accepting a buyout felt like a "perfectly sensible and organic to the story" way to remove the character from the series, and described the ending scene with Ron and Wendy as an effective cliffhanger building up to the third season. Eric Hochberger of TV Fanatic said, "We can sum up the episode in one word: perfection." Hochberger praised the characterization in the script, and particularly enjoyed that the former pit, a long-time device for the series, was used for the concert and Mark's departure. CraveOnline writer Blair Marnell described "Freddy Spaghetti" as one of the best episodes of the series. He praised the writing, particularly the jokes involving Andy and Ron's love of budget cuts, but said Leslie's character ultimately carried the story and had the best jokes. Kona Gallagher of TV Squad said the episode "end[ed] an already phenomenal season on a high note" and said she loved the symmetry of the finale. Gallagher particularly praised Scott's new character, claiming "his bruised idealism is a nice match for Leslie's blind idealism", but said Lowe's character continued to lack depth, and described the April and Andy subplot as predictable.

"Freddy Spaghetti" was the last new episode of Parks and Recreation to air for eight months (until "Go Big or Go Home") because, after the season finale aired, NBC announced the show was being moved to an undisclosed midseason premiere date to allow the network's new comedy, Outsourced, to run in the Thursday two-hour comedy schedule block. New York magazine writer Steve Kandell noted this move by NBC against the show bore some "thematic similarities" between the government shutdown plot of "Freddy Spaghetti". It was eventually announced the Parks and Recreation third season would premiere on January 20, 2011.

== DVD release ==
After "Freddy Spaghetti" aired, a producer's cut of the episode was featured on the official NBC website. It included four extra minutes of deleted scenes, plus additional footage with Lowe, Scott and the regular cast members. This version of the episode, along with the 22-minute television version and the other 23 second season episodes of Parks and Recreation, was later released on a four-disc DVD set in the United States on November 30, 2010. The DVD included deleted scenes for each episode.

Among the deleted scenes in the producer's cut were a scene of Tom and Lucy running off to Ann's house to have sex, where they are interrupted by a nonchalant and seemingly unfazed Chris Traeger. Another cut scene included Tom and Ann in which the two share a pleasant moment and Tom cheers her up over her conflicting romantic feelings, only for Tom to ruin it by proposing three-way sex between them and Lucy. The DVD also included a commentary track for "Freddy Spaghetti" featuring Amy Poehler, Aziz Ansari, Nick Offerman, Rashida Jones, Adam Scott, Aubrey Plaza, Chris Pratt, Jim O'Heir, Retta and Michael Schur.
