= The Master Plan (Parks and Recreation) =

- Parks and Recreation episode
- Episode no.: Season 2 Episode 23
- Directed by: Dean Holland
- Written by: Michael Schur
- Original air date: May 13, 2010

Guest appearances
- Adam Scott as Ben Wyatt; Rob Lowe as Chris Traeger; Alison Becker as Shauna Malwae-Tweep; April Marie Eden as Trish Ianetta; Andy Forrest as Kyle; Natalie Morales as Lucy; Jim O'Heir as Jerry Gergich; Retta as Donna Meagle; Phil Reeves as Paul Iaresco; Ralph Richeson as Ghoulish Man; Ben Schwartz as Jean-Ralphio Saperstein

Episode chronology
← Previous "Telethon"	Next → "Freddy Spaghetti"
- Parks and Recreation season 2

"The Master Plan" is the 23rd and penultimate episode of the second season of the American comedy television series Parks and Recreation, and the 29th overall episode of the series. It originally aired on NBC in the United States on May 13, 2010. In the episode, Pawnee's major budget problems result in state auditors (Adam Scott and Rob Lowe) arriving to make major cuts, much to Leslie's horror and Ron's delight. Meanwhile, Andy contemplates asking April to be his girlfriend, and Tom seeks a new girlfriend.

The episode was directed by Dean Holland and written by series co-creator Michael Schur. "The Master Plan" featured the first series appearances by Scott and Lowe, who became permanent cast members as characters Ben Wyatt and Chris Traeger. The episode also introduced Natalie Morales as Lucy, Tom's new girlfriend, and featured guest appearances by Ralph Richeson as "the ghoulish man" and regular series guests Ben Schwartz, April Marie Eden and Alison Becker.

The idea of Pawnee's governmental problems were inspired by news reports at the time of a number of states shutting down schools, parks and other services due to the global recession. "The Master Plan" marked the end of the romantic relationship between Ann (Rashida Jones) and Mark (Paul Schneider), which allowed for the eventual departure of Schneider from the series. A subplot featuring romantic elements between Ann and Chris was a late addition to the script to better connect Lowe to the cast.

This episode features six characters (five main characters) meeting their eventual spouses for the first time. Ann and Chris meet, Leslie and Ben meet and Tom and Lucy meet.

According to Nielsen Media Research, "The Master Plan" was seen by 4.28 million household viewers, a five percent increase in viewership compared to the previous episode, "Telethon". The episode received generally positive reviews, with several commentators praising the addition of Scott and Lowe to the cast, although some said Scott had more long-term potential as a character than Lowe. The episode is widely considered a turning point in the series. "The Master Plan" and the rest of the second season of Parks and Recreation was released on DVD in the United States on November 30, 2010, which included an extended 30-minute "producer's cut" of the episode.

== Plot ==
Leslie excitedly prepares to present the parks department budget proposal, or "master plan". However, city manager Paul announces due to Pawnee's huge budget deficit, all proposals will be postponed indefinitely. State auditors have been sent by the governor to solve the impasse, which makes Leslie fear severe cuts. Ron is delighted because he hates any government spending, which leads him to have heated arguments with Leslie. Meanwhile, April is turning 21 and is having her birthday party at Tom's favorite nightclub, the Snakehole Lounge. Andy debates whether to ask April to be his girlfriend, but worries about the age difference because he is 29. Ann has broken up with Mark, and they meet for lunch to discuss the end of their relationship. Mark is confused as to why Ann has decided to break up with him because they never fought and everything seemed to be going perfect and smoothly. Ann explains that their lack of fighting was actually a bad thing because it meant their relationship had no passion, and she adds that Mark isn't used to dating anyone for a long period of time and over-stated the relationship's strength for that reason.

State auditors Chris Traeger and Ben Wyatt soon arrive, and the extremely cheerful Chris paints an optimistic picture of how they will fix the budget, but leaves the details to the more serious Ben. When Ben explains they will need to slash the budget of every department by nearly 40 or 50 %, Leslie angrily lashes out at Ben, who responds to her that the poorly managed government is to blame. Later, at April's party, Tom desperately tries to pick up women, but to no avail, while Leslie and Ann get extremely drunk together. Andy and April appear to be getting along, but when he goes to the bar to get a drink for April, a drunken Ann flirts with him. An upset April flirts with Tom's annoying friend Jean-Ralphio to make Andy jealous. Andy gets upset, believing he misread April's signals all along, and April later regrets what she did. Ben arrives at the party and tries to smooth things out with a drunken Leslie, but she again angrily lashes out at him.

The next morning, Ann fears she made out with someone at the party but cannot remember. She eventually learns she made out with Chris, who shows a romantic interest in her. Tom returns to the Snakehole Lounge to close his tab, where he meets the bartender, Lucy, who makes fun of his efforts to pick up women. The two get along and Lucy gives Tom her phone number, to his immense pleasure. Leslie decides to apologize to Ben, and he invites her out for a beer. As they finally start to get along, Leslie realizes Ben was the mayor of a small town called Partridge, Minnesota. It was national news because he was only 18 when elected, and he promptly drove the entire government into the ground. Ben became a state auditor to prove he can be responsible and restart his political career. Later, at the parks department budget meeting, Chris and Ben reveal Pawnee's budget crisis was far worse than previously thought and that the Pawnee government will shut down until further notice, horrifying Leslie and delighting Ron.

== Production ==
=== Writing ===
Most cities and towns in the country right now are going through these rough patches involving plummeting tax revenue and layoffs. So we're doing a torn-from-the-headlines thing.

— Michael Schur,
Parks and Recreation co-creator

"The Master Plan" was written by Parks and Recreation co-creator, Michael Schur. It was his fifth writing credit for the series after, "Pilot", "Greg Pikitis", "Christmas Scandal", and "Galentine's Day". The idea of state auditors visiting Pawnee, and the subsequent government shutdown, was inspired by news reports at the time of a number of states considering shutting down schools, parks and other services due to the global recession. In particular, Schur cited stories about Kansas City closing down several of their public schools, and Idaho threatening to shut down the state parks department. Similar measures were being discussed in such states as New York, New Jersey and California. This was in keeping with efforts by the Parks and Recreation writers to be more topical with second season episodes. Upon learning of the spending freeze, Ron and Leslie engage in heated arguments over the function of government, with Leslie insisting the government is meant to provide social services and Ron advocating as little government intervention as possible. Throughout most of the second season, much of the relationship between Leslie and Ron focused on the two developing a mutual respect for each other. However, with the introduction of the Ben Wyatt character and the conflict over budget problems in Pawnee, the writers included these arguments between Leslie and Ron to illustrate their conflicting political ideologies and develop tension amid the character and the city hall setting.

"The Master Plan" marked the end of the romantic relationship between Mark and Ann, which had lasted throughout the entire second season. This allowed for the eventual departure of Paul Schneider, who was leaving the series at the end of the second season. The title of "The Master Plan" stemmed from the fact that real-life municipal planning documents in small American towns are often called the "master plan", like the one Leslie refers to in the episode. Schur said of this, "It seems so funny to call the municipal budgets and planning documents for a small city in Indiana the 'master plan'." Schur said the Parks and Recreation writing staff believed the title of the episode was appropriate because the subplots of "The Master Plan" revolved around the various plans of the characters. While Leslie is dealing with the literal master plan for the Pawnee budget proposal, April's plan is to seek a romantic relationship with Andy, and Tom's plan is to find a girlfriend at April's birthday party.

The idea of Ann making out with Chris Traeger was not part of the original screenplay, but was added after the first cast read-through of the script. The writing staff felt that while Ben was immediately connected to Leslie and the other characters through his role in eliminating wasteful spending at Pawnee, Chris still needed something to more strongly connect to the cast, and the subplot with Ann was determined to be a funny way to do it. In one scene, after Ben explains the need for severe budget cuts at Pawnee, Ron asks Leslie, "What's a not gay way to ask him to go camping with me?" That line was not in the first draft of the script, but was added during filming as a possible alternative line for the editors to choose from later. The staff found it so funny, however, that they chose to use it and the original line was never filmed.

During another scene at the Snakehole Lounge, a drunken Leslie angrily yells to Ben, "I just talked to everybody in this bar and nobody wants you here." That line was written by Harris Wittels, who wrote past screenplays for other Parks and Recreation episodes. During the end credits, Andy sings a song he wrote for April called "November," which includes the lyrics, "Let's spread our wings and fly on a date." This is also a reference to "Woman of the Year," in which Andy explained every song he writes includes either the lyrics, "Spread your wings and fly" or "You deserve to be a champion." Schur, who wrote the words to "November", said it was especially challenging working one of those phrases into a love song.

=== Casting ===
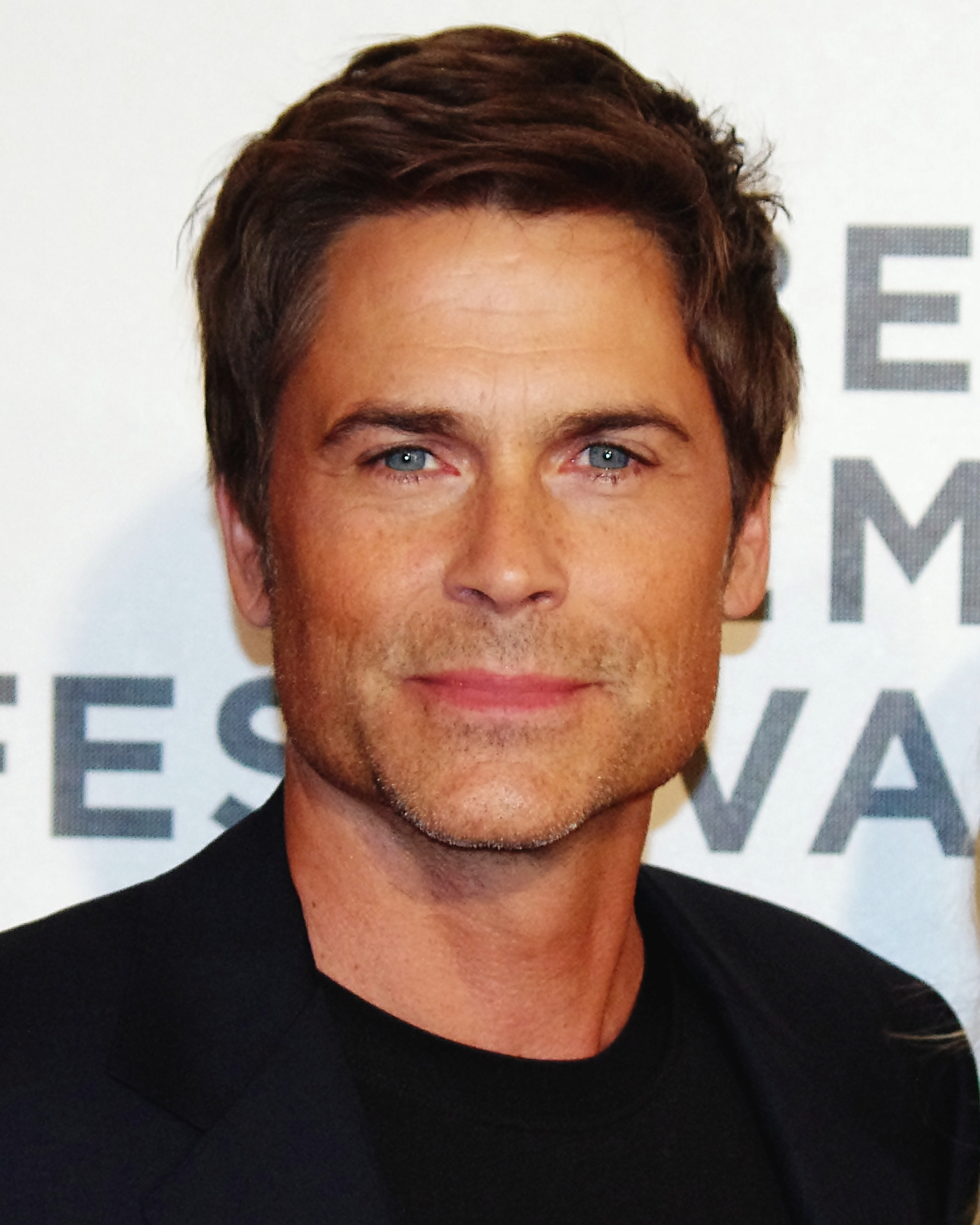
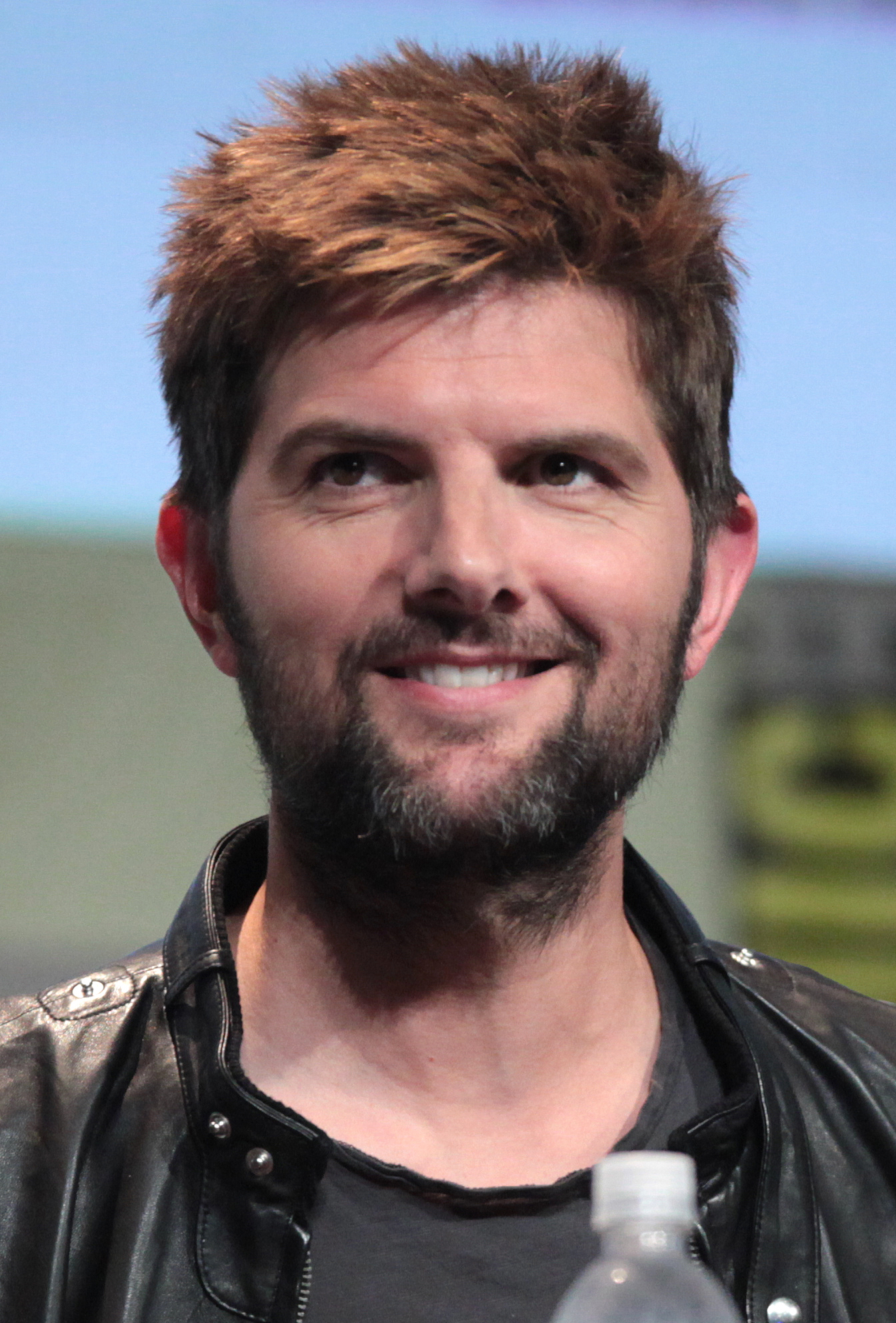
Rob Lowe (left) and Adam Scott (right) made their first appearances as, respectively, Chris Traeger and Ben Wyatt.

"The Master Plan" marked the first appearance of Adam Scott, who also appeared in the subsequent season finale "Freddy Spaghetti" and became a regular cast member during the third season. Scott left the Starz comedy Party Down to join the Parks and Recreation cast, a decision he made in part because it was unclear whether Starz would renew the series: "It was a matter of me asking Starz if it was going to continue, and them saying they weren't ready to make that decision. I couldn't pass up the opportunity on Parks and Rec for a show that could possibly not exist anymore." Schur said when the Ben Wyatt character was written, Scott was envisioned as the "dream scenario" for casting. Schur described Scott as "brilliant and funny" and praised his comedic range: "There just aren't that many people with a comedic range that spans 'Step Brothers' to 'Party Down.'". Several commentators said Ben Wyatt closely resembles the character Scott played on Party Down, Henry Pollard. While Ben was a politician who found great success at a young age then suffered a downfall, Henry was an actor who became a caterer after his acting career declined. Scott, however, said he feels they are "vastly different characters and circumstances". The idea of a character trying to rebuild a government career following a humiliating public failure was one of the original ideas for the series of Parks and Recreation in general, but one that was ultimately not used until the Ben Wyatt character was introduced. During the scene when Ben explains his failed mayoral tenure, shots of a newspaper clip with images of the character's prom pictures are shown. Those pictures are the actual high school prom photos of actor Adam Scott.

It was like, if he had just got into Pawnee on day two he would walk into Starbucks and every single person would know him and he'd be like, "Jimmy, how's the dog?' 'Hey did you catch anything when you went fishing?' He would know everybody.

— Screenwriter Harris Wittels,
about the Chris Traeger character

The episode also featured the first in a string of guest appearances by actor Rob Lowe, who had recently departed from the ABC drama series Brothers & Sisters. As a joke, Rob Lowe's credit during the opening credits reads "and introducing Rob Lowe". Unlike Scott, Lowe was originally not expected to join the regular cast, but rather make guest appearances in "Freddy Spaghetti" and six third season episodes before departing the show. However, after those episodes were filmed, Lowe later joined the show as a regular cast member. Lowe said he loved playing the part, which he described as "a big fat nerd" and "the most positive person in the world [with] unrelenting enthusiasm", adding, "He is also very, very intense and specific. So whether he's ordering how he would like his water or describing the kind of colors he wants on a graph, everything means the world to him." Throughout the episode, whenever he meets someone new, Chris Traeger points directly at their face and slowly repeats their name. Schur said this habit was the first element the writers conceived for the character. In one line of the episode, while describing his exercise regimen and supplements, "Scientists believe that the first human being who will live 150 years has already been born. I believe I am that human being." That line was inspired by Schur's wife, J. J. Philbin, who had recently read an article about that scientific prediction and felt it applied to the character. Parks and Recreation was suffering in the Nielsen ratings when "The Master Plan" aired, and it was hoped Lowe's appearance would help increase viewership. Lowe's performance was heavily publicized in advance of the episode's original broadcast.

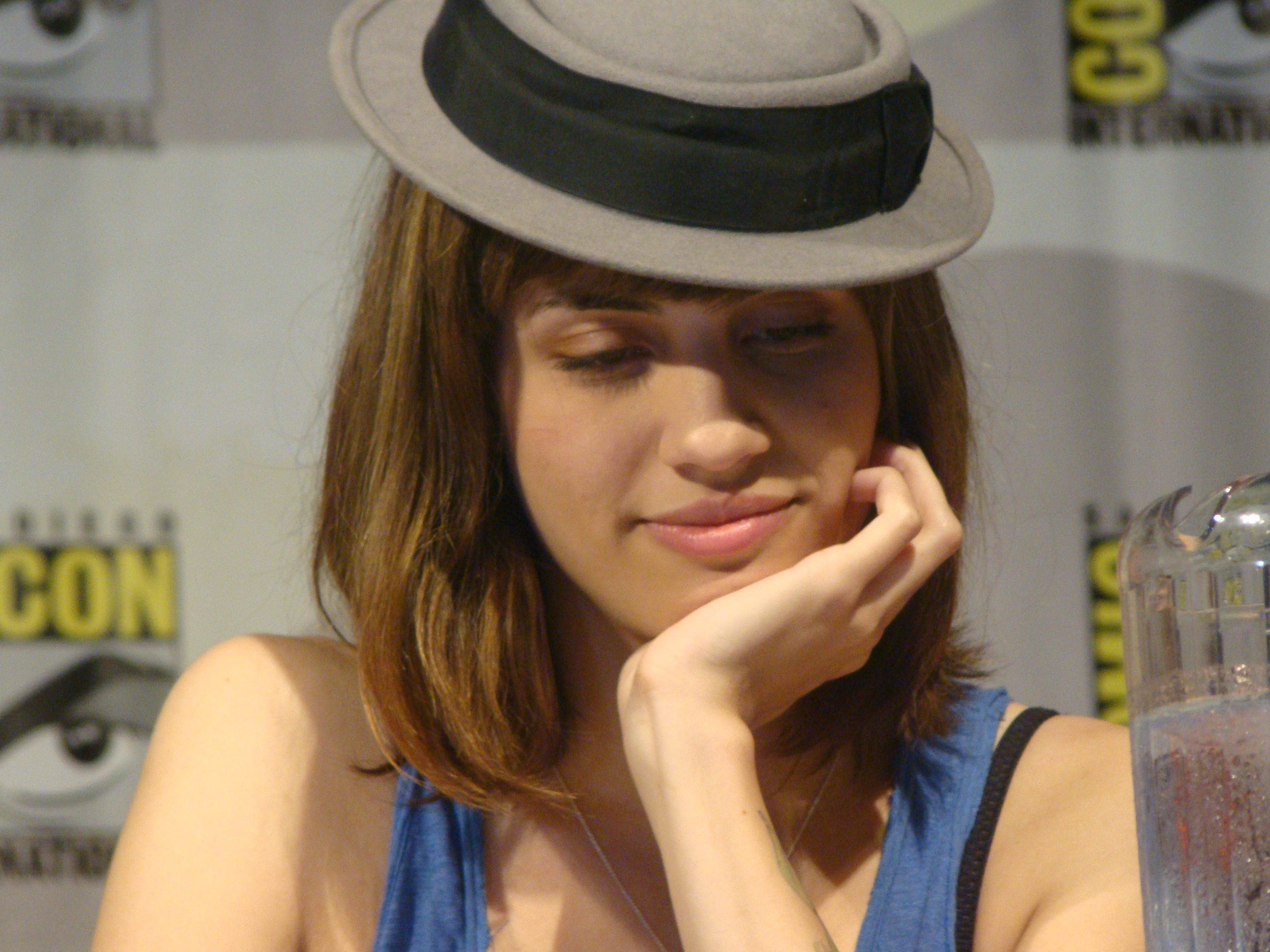
"The Master Plan" marked the first of several performances by Natalie Morales as Lucy, romantic interest for Tom Haverford.

"The Master Plan" featured several other guest appearances. Ben Schwartz returned to his recurring role as Tom's fast-talking friend, Jean-Ralphio. Natalie Morales, best known for her role in the ABC Family science-fiction dramedy The Middleman, made her first Parks and Recreation appearance in the episode as Lucy, a Pawnee bartender and romantic interest for Tom. The scene between Lucy and Tom at the Snakehole Lounge was the same scene Natalie Morales read during her audition for the part, although the dialogue was rewritten slightly before filming. The line with Lucy asking Tom if he flirted with so many women because he was expected to have a "43-way" was added during the rewrite. Ralph Richeson, best known for playing the unkempt hotel employee Richardson in the HBO drama series Deadwood, briefly appeared as an unkempt man seeking a marriage license in the Pawnee town hall. Richeson is credited as "Ghoulish Man" in the episode's end credits. April Marie Eden, who played beauty contest winner Trish Ianetta in the episode "Beauty Pageant", reprised that role in "The Master Plan", in scenes where Tom flirted with her relentlessly at the Snakehole Lounge. Alison Becker, who played local reporter Shauna Malwae-Tweep in several past episodes, filmed several scenes where she and Andy flirt, but he ultimately rejects her due to his feelings for April. All of these scenes were cut from the final episode due to length restrictions, which Schur said he regretted because he found Becker very funny.

=== Filming ===
"The Master Plan" was directed by Dean Holland, his third directorial credit after "Greg Pikitis" and "Sweetums". The script read-through and filming took place in March 2010. Rob Lowe's first day of filming took place on his birthday, March 17, which was the same day the scene where he kissed Rashida Jones was shot. The original cut of "The Master Plan" was a full 30 minutes and had to be cut down to 22 minutes for broadcast. The staff of Parks and Recreation had difficulty editing the episode down because the script involved so many interconnected subplots between the characters. Screenwriter Harris Wittels said, "As soon as you'd cut one thing, you had to cut something else because it was tied to another piece." Among the scenes cut were an extended cold open in which Ron gives April a handgun for her 21st birthday, much to the chagrin of Leslie. Also cut was a scene in which Ron chastises Leslie for yelling at Ben at the Snakehole Lounge and orders her to apologize to him so she will not be fired. Instead, the episode was changed to reflect that Leslie decided to apologize to Ben herself, with the line from Leslie "I have to go swallow my pride" added just before she spoke to Ben.

During one scene, Ann and Mark have a discussion at J.J.'s Diner, a Pawnee restaurant that had previously been featured in the episodes "The Reporter" and "Summer Catalog". In all three episodes, a different interior set is used, although the exterior building shots are the same. At the Snakehole Lounge, Tom flirts with a woman by giving her a bottle cap "to remember him by", then later unsuccessfully tries to find her again in the nightclub. This was not part of the script, and was conceived and added to the episode about 10 minutes before the scene was shot. During one of the final scenes, when Ben informs Leslie and Ron that the Pawnee government will be shut down, Ron looks directly at the camera and makes a comical grin. Although Leslie is supposed to be horrified by the news, the scene had to be re-shot many times because she kept laughing at Ron's facial expression.

== Cultural references ==
Andy says of Jean-Ralphio, "That Ralph Macchio guy's a total douche." This is a reference to Ralph Macchio, an actor who appeared in the 1983 drama film The Outsiders, which also starred Rob Lowe. The line was improvised by actor Chris Pratt. In another scene, Ben tells Leslie the song he played after getting sworn in as an 18-year-old mayor was "Whoomp! (There It Is)", a 1993 hip hop song by the duo Tag Team. The episode features several quotes from author and outdoorsman Jack London. Among them, which Leslie reads from her master plan proposal, is, "You can't wait for inspiration. You have to go after it with a club," and "So I say the function of man is to live, not to exist. I would rather that my spark should burn out in a brilliant blaze than it should be stifled by dry-rot." The original script included about one dozen different London quotes, but most were cut from the final draft. Schur said he used London quotes because he believed the author was one both Leslie and Ron would admire. At one point in the episode, while discussing April's birthday, Leslie says, "Damn the wheel of the world! Why must it continually turn over?" to which Ron replied approvingly, "Jack London." The line was improvised by actor Nick Offerman.

== Reception ==
In its original American broadcast, "The Master Plan" was seen by an estimated 4.28 million household viewers, according to Nielsen Media Research. It marked a five percent increase in viewership compared to the previous episode, "Telethon", and was the only NBC series on May 13 to show an improvement in ratings over the previous week; the comedies The Office, Community, 30 Rock and The Marriage Ref all saw declines. HitFix writer Daniel Fienberg did not believe Rob Lowe's guest appearance significantly helped the Parks and Recreation ratings, calling the increase "a statistically irrelevant bump". "The Master Plan" received a 2.7 rating/5 share among overall viewers, and a 2.0 rating/6 share among viewers between ages 18 and 49. Parks and Recreation ranked third in its timeslot, behind the CBS reality series Survivor: Heroes vs. Villains and the Fox crime drama Bones, but received higher ratings than the ABC science-fiction drama FlashForward and the first season finale of the CW Network supernatural fantasy series The Vampire Diaries.

Overall this was a solid episode with a couple of great new characters, but it was the quieter character moments that really stood out. Andy thinking April had ditched him for Jean Ralphio. Leslie and Ben bonding over Ben's "Teen Mayor" back-story. Tom meeting Lucy. These are great examples of the reason why Parks and Rec has become so well-rounded.

— Matt Fowler, IGN

"The Master Plan" received generally positive reviews. Matt Fowler of IGN said the budget problems created strong character development potential for Leslie and comedic opportunities for Ron. Fowler also enjoyed that the normally-dissolute Tom formed an authentic romantic connection, and said Chris Pratt brought "a certain naturalness" to a role that could otherwise have been overly idiotic. Emily VanDerWerff of The A.V. Club strongly praised the episode, praising Rob Lowe and the entire regular cast. She declared Parks and Recreation the best television show since Arrested Development, and said, "As much as I like the '50 jokes a minute' style of comedies ... I'm a sucker for a show where the characters are as well-wrought and as purely funny as they are on this show." HitFix writer Alan Sepinwall praised the implementation of the new characters, particularly the fact that the script did not rely too heavily on them. Sepinwall also said the episode balanced well the workplace humor with the romantic subplots between Leslie and Ben, April and Andy, and Ann and Chris.

New York Daily News writer David Hinckley said Lowe and Scott were strong additions to the show, and that Scott's character in Parks was better than his character in Party Down. Hinckley said the humor "remains happily rooted in the show's eccentric characters", although he said some of the jokes, like Andy's "November" song "sometimes feels like a series of short sketches instead of a show". New York magazine writer Steve Kandell described Lowe as entertaining but "one-note", but said Adam Scott was "much more promising and nuanced", with better potential for a romantic interest for Leslie than previous guest stars like Will Arnett and Justin Theroux. Kandell felt Schneider's imminent departure from the series seemed unceremonious, and praised Nick Offerman's reactions of "unbridled ecstasy" at the idea of cutbacks and the government shutdown. Eric Hochberger of TV Fanatic expressed doubt about the long-term effectiveness of Lowe's character, and said the April and Andy subplot felt "dragged out for yet another week". However, he praised the script, the addition of Scott, and the performance of the entire cast, especially Rashida Jones and Aziz Ansari. Hochberger said, "I'm not convinced Parks and Recreation could have a bad episode at this point in the season." TV Squad writer Kona Gallagher felt "The Master Plan" was an especially important episode due to the addition of the Lowe and Scott characters, the beginning of Mark's exit from the series and the economic problems for Pawnee. However, Gallagher also said the episode felt mostly like a preparation for the third season.

== DVD release ==
After "The Master Plan" aired, a producer's cut of the episode was featured on the official NBC website. It included eight extra minutes, which consisted of deleted scenes, an extended ending and additional footage with Lowe and Scott. This version of the episode, along with the 22-minute television version and the other 23 second season episodes of Parks and Recreation, was later released on a four-disc DVD set in the United States on November 30, 2010. The DVD included deleted scenes for each episode. It also included a commentary track for "The Master Plan" featuring Nick Offerman, Adam Scott, Dean Holland, Michael Schur, Harris Wittels and Parks and Recreation producer Morgan Sackett.
