= JC Gonzalez =

Colombian actor and singer-songwriter (born 1990)

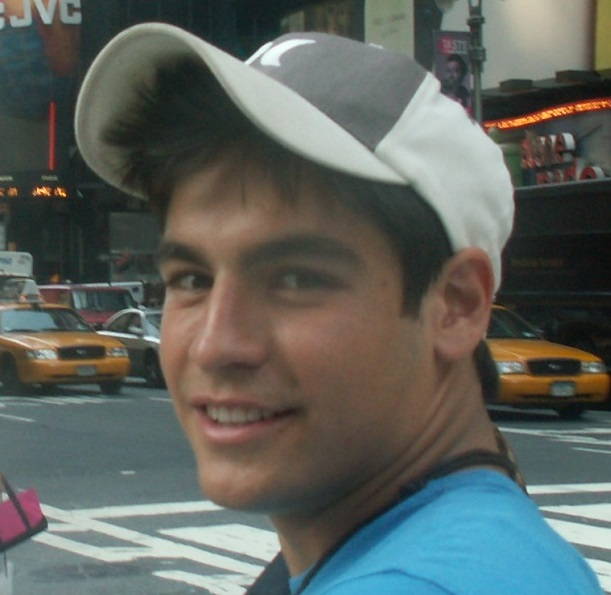
- Gonzalez in New York City
- Born: Juan Camilo Gonzalez; March 8, 1990 (age 36); Bogotá, Colombia
- Education: Clements High School
- Musical career
- Occupations: Actor; singer-songwriter
- Instruments: Vocals; guitar; piano
- Years active: 2005–present
- Website: jcgonzalez.net

Juan Camilo Gonzalez (born March 8, 1990) is a Colombian actor and singer-songwriter. His career began in 2009, when he participated in television commercials and advertisements in Texas. Gonzalez was also a candidate on Making Menudo, an MTV reality show for which they selected twenty-five bilingual male singers. Gonzalez has also made appearances in film and television, such as Parks and Recreation, the webseries Blue, and Los Americans.

== Early years ==
Gonzalez was born in Bogotá, Colombia in 1990. He has two younger siblings. Gonzalez was classified as a hyperactive child, and therefore earned the nickname of "terremoto" (Earthquake). Gonzalez and his family moved to Houston when he was seven years old so that his younger brother could receive medical treatment.

Gonzalez started his elementary school at Gimnasio Los Caobos in Bogotá and attended Clements High School in Sugar Land, Texas, graduating in 2009.

== Career ==
=== Music ===
Gonzalez has recorded original material as well as a remix of the song "El Perdón" by Enrique Iglesias and Nicky Jam. As of 2016, Gonzalez was preparing his debut solo album, titled AwakIn, which is set to feature songs in English and Spanish with a mix of Latin rhythms and American rap and pop.

=== Television and cinema ===
Gonzalez began his acting career in television commercials in Texas. After graduating from high school, Gonzalez moved to Los Angeles where he began working in commercials and television series. He has done television commercials for Ford, Honda, and AT&T.

In January 2007, Gonzalez auditioned for Making Menudo in Los Angeles. He did not make the cut, and so he began dance lessons and auditioned again in Dallas. In Dallas, he was selected by the Puerto rican singer Luis Fonsi and the radio announcer Daniel Luna as one of the twenty-five participants who would go to New York City where they were filmed in the Road to Menudo series.

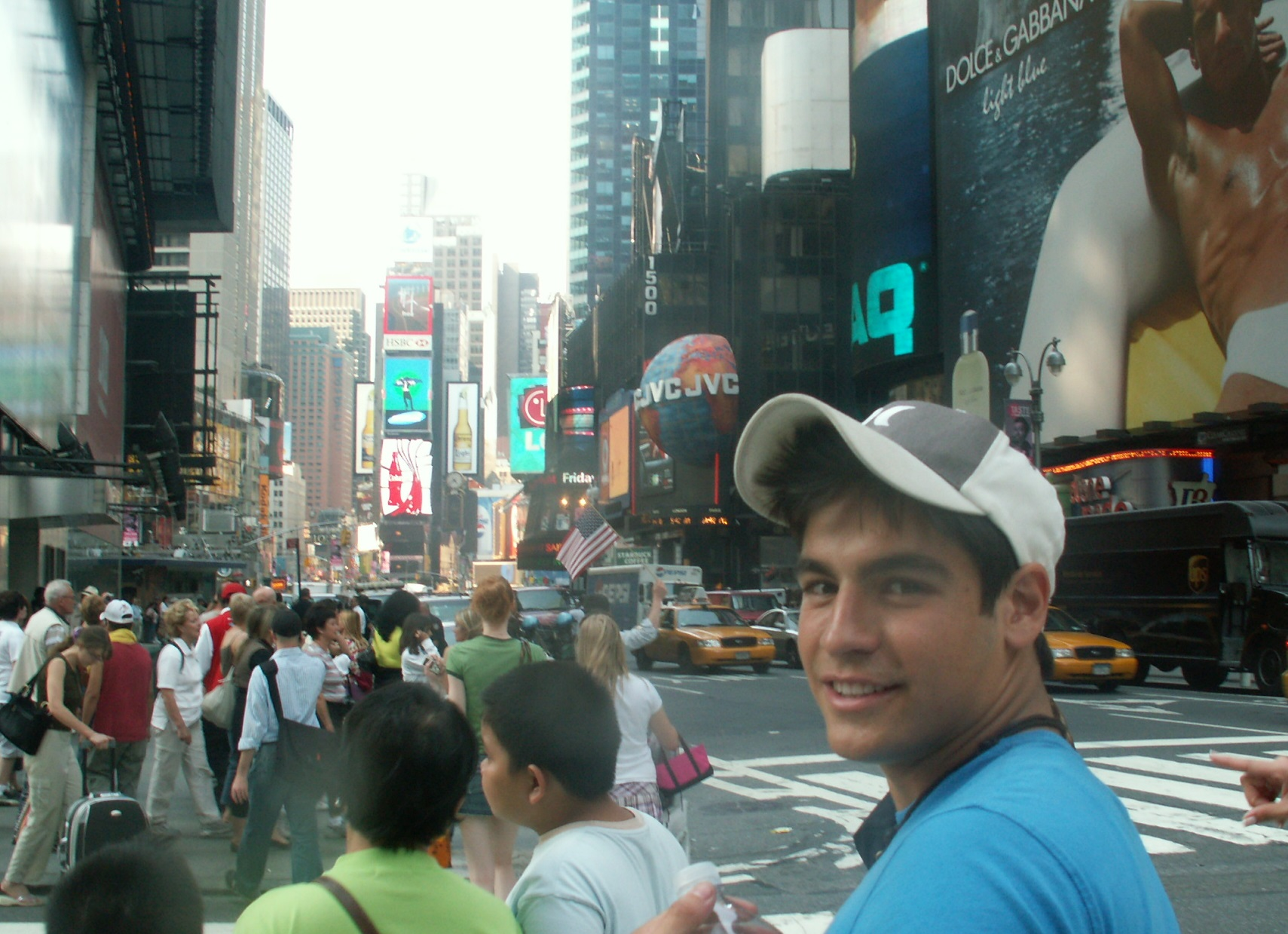
Gonzalez walking for "Fifth Avenue" in Manhattan, New York, June 2007

Finally in 2007, for the same Making Menudo project Gonzalez was selected to be part of the jury of the new version of the Latino boy band Menudo. The band would be a fusion of urban, pop and rock music in English and Spanish to produce several albums with the label of Sony BMG Epic Records. Several auditions were held in different cities such as Los Angeles, Dallas, Miami, New York City, among others. Gonzalez was a part of the Dallas competition where along the side of radio announcer Daniel Luna they chose varies contestants and in their pickings, Gonzalez was 1 of the 25 selected.

As part of the show, Gonzalez along with fourteen other aspiring artists, was trained in singing and dancing in South Beach, Florida for almost four months.

Gonzalez, during his acting career participated in the web series Los Americans (2011), which is characterized by having a multigenerational focus, a middle-class family living in Los Angeles. During the series, he participated with Esai Morales, Lupe Ontiveros, Tony Plana, Raymond Cruz, Yvonne DeLaRosa, and Ana Villafañe. In 2009, Gonzalez appeared in the Parks and Recreation episode Sister City as Jhonny, a Venezuelan intern.

In 2010, Gonzalez played the lead role in the video for Kaya Rosenthal (Can't Get You Out of My Mind). Gonzalez has also appeared in Locked Up Abroad, Hard Times, How to Rock, and Parenthood.

In Banged Up Abroad, JC Gonzalez appeared as Lia McCord's brother, who was arrested at the Bangladesh Airport for trafficking narcotics.

In 2010, In The second season of the NBC comedy-drama series Parenthood (season 2) Gonzalez played the role of a dancer in the Episode The Berger Cometh.

Also in 2010, Gonzalez worked with Ariana Grande in a role of her love interest in Victorious episode Survival of the Hottest.

In Parenthood (season 2) Gonzalez did the role of a Fraternity young man in the episode Orange Alert. Then in 2011, Gonzalez worked in Big Time Strike episode of Big Time Rush.

In 2012, Gonzalez played the character of a Football Player Bully in the episode How to Rock a Newscast of the American teen sitcom How to Rock that ran on Nickelodeon from February 4 to December 8, 2012.

During 2015 and 2018 Gonzalez's notable works included the role of "Jake" in episode "Blue Christmas" of American television series NCIS: New Orleans , role of "Kyle" in American procedural drama television series 9-1-1 (TV series) and an appearance as "DJ Diego Spiz" in Amazon Studios's American legal drama web television Goliath.

Gonzalez starred in Los Americans, an Internet series that was launched in May 2011. In 2013, Gonzalez appeared in the web series Blue. Gonzalez has also worked on other web series, including Ragdolls in 2013. In 2015, Gonzalez took on the role of Jake in the NCIS: New Orleans program, in the episode Blue Christmas.

== Personal life ==
Gonzalez currently resides in Sugar Land, Texas, a suburb of Houston.

JC Gonzalez has been characterized by his impetus, as indicated by the portal 'Pantallazos de Noticias' , where they claim that they have been traits of the personality of his maternal grandmother, Cándida Rueda, known for being the manager of Hotel San Carlos in Barrancabermeja, (Santander, Colombia).

The artist has also made it known through several interviews that one of his engines is his brother Daniel, who has largely overcome a strange disease called Arthrogryposis Multiplex Congenita (AMC), and has taught him that without effort there is no reward, from there, says the singer, his discipline comes.

== Philanthropy ==
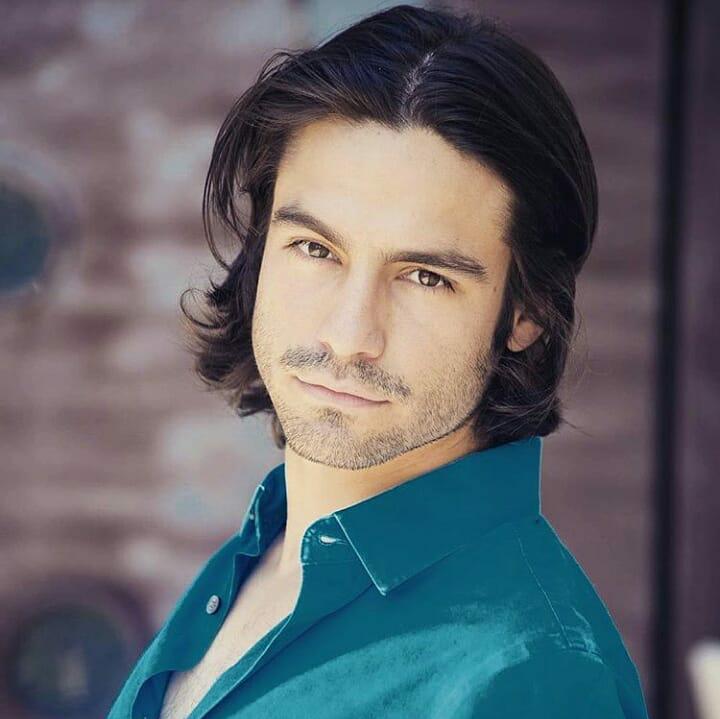

The song "Safe Passage" was sung by JC Gonzalez for the thrive Integrative wellness and women of watts and beyond, in California, USA. He sang it in Gatherings and festivals which supports those who have survived and fighters of domestic violence.

== Filmography ==
=== Film ===
Year	Title	Role	Notes
2009	Second Coming	Police officer	Video; Credited as Juan Camilo
2011	11-11-11	Ryan	
2012	Slumber Party Slaughter	Randy	
2014	11:11	Ryan	Short
2015	Elena	Victor	Short
2015	Hot Flash: The Chronicles of Lara Tate – Menopausal Superhero	Cock Block	
2017	More Than Enough	Collin	Film by Director: Anne-Marie Hess; Original title: Good After Bad
2018	Ernesto's Manifesto	Logan	

=== Television ===
Year	Title	Role	Notes
2007	Making Menudo	JC	MTV Reality Show
2008	Locked Up Abroad	Eliadah "Lia" McCord brother	Episode: "Bangladesh" National Geographic Channel
2009	Parks and Recreation	Jhonny Quijada	Episode: "Sister City"
2010	The Hard Times of RJ Berger	dancer with knife	Episode "The Berger Cometh"
2010	Victorious	Ben	Episode: "Survival of the Hottest"
2010	Parenthood	Fraternity young man	Episode: "Orange Alert"
2011	Big Time Rush	Costart	Episode: "Big Time Strike"
2012	How to Rock	Football Player Bully	Episode: "How to Rock a Newscast"
2013	RagDolls	Mateo	4 episodes
2014	I Didn't Do It	Mike	Episode: "Lindy Nose Best"
2015	NCIS: New Orleans	Jake	Episode: "Blue Christmas"
2018	9-1-1	Kyle	Episode: "Point of Origin"
2018	Goliath	DJ Diego Spiz	Episode: "Two Cinderellas"

=== Webisodes ===
Year	Title	Role	Notes
2009	Love Fifteen	Cindy Lee's son	Cindy Lee (Paola Turbay)
2011	Los Americans	Paul Valenzuela	8 episodes
2013	Blue	Harry	Episode: "What Kind of a Name Is Blue?"

=== Commercials ===
Commercial	Paper	Channel
Honda Fit (English/Spanish)	Principal	National
Jack in the Box (Spanish)	Principal	National
Houston Community College Institutional Commercial	Principal	Regional
Hasbro Nerf Vulcan	Principal	Regional
Academy Sports + Outdoors	Principal	Regional
Houston Community College	Principal	Regional (Institutional)
National Car Rental	Principal	Online
Fiesta Rock	Principal	Regional
Connect EDU	Principal	Online
Wii	Principal	National
KFC	Principal	National
AT&T	Principal	National
Ford Focus	Principal	National

== Discography ==
Year	Title	Position		Album
Year	Title	E.E.U.U R&B	E.E.U.U Rap	Album
2015	Equation of Love	—	—	Equation of Love – Single
2015	Quiet Game	—	—	Quiet Game – Single
2015	Cupid	—	—	AwakIN
2015	Zoom	—	—	Zoom – Single
2015	Prendete	—	—	AwakIN
2016	Solitary Conversations	—	—	2moonS
2016	Luchando	—	—	2moonS
2016	Let me be me	—	—	2moonS
