= Dog watch (disambiguation) =

A dog watch is a type of shift used aboard ships.

Dog watch may also refer to:

- Dogwatch (film), a 1996 American action crime thriller film
- Dog Watch (1945 film), a 1945 animated short
- Dogwatch Saddle, a geographic feature in Victoria Land, Antarctica
- Dogwatching, a 1986 book written by Desmond Morris
