= N/A (play) =

2024 play by Mario Correa

- 2024 Off-Broadway poster
- Original language: English
- Written by: Mario Correa
- Subject: Nancy Pelosi, Alexandria Ocasio-Cortez, Congress leadership, apprentice, fame
- Genre: Docudrama
- Setting: "The recent past"; United States House of Representatives, Washington, D.C.

Premiere
- Date: June 11, 2024
- Place: Mitzi Newhouse Theater; New York City, New York

N/A is a play by Mario Correa. It is a two-hander that presents a fictionalization of the relationship of two women: Nancy Pelosi, the first female Speaker of the House of Representatives, and Alexandria Ocasio-Cortez the youngest woman ever elected to the House of Representatives.

The play first premiered off-Broadway in 2024 starring Holland Taylor and Ana Villafañe, where it was filmed for PBS.

== Synopsis ==
The play takes a look at several fictional meetings between "N" (Nancy Pelosi) and "A" (Alexandria Ocasio-Cortez) during N's second term as Speaker of the House of Representatives. Their first introductions occur in 2019 after A's swearing in to the House of Representatitves and their last is in 2023 when N loses her speakership when the Democratic party lost the House majority. Over the course of the play, the two women discuss their differing views on the modern political climate, leadership, privilege, paths to progress, the value of appearance, and - above everything else - their duties as public representatives. And, while they aren't able to agree on all political issues, they both seem to find a common ground in their political purpose, both as a part of their unified party and individually. Their final shown exchange occurs as N departs her office for the last time, in which she recalls something A shared in an earlier meeting: "Más o menos - leave it better than you found it."

== Production history ==
=== Off-Broadway (2024) ===
Previews for the play's world premiere production began on June 11, 2024 at the Mitzi Newhouse Theater ahead of an official opening on June 23 scheduled as a limited engagement. The production starred Holland Taylor and Ana Villafañe as the titular characters N and A, respectively. It was directed by Diane Paulus featured scenery and costumes designed by Myung Hee Cho, lighting by Mextly Couzin, sound design by Sunny Kil, and projections by Yee Eun Nam. Producers on the show included Jeffrey Richards, Louise Gund, Bob Boyett, Broadway Breakfast Club, Kathleen K. Johnson, Brenda Boone, Patrick W. Jones, Maia Kayla Glasman, and Brandon J. Schwartz. It closed on September 1 of the same year.

The production was filmed in August 2024 and released on WNET PBS as a part of Theater Close-Up on May 13, 2026.

== Notable Casts ==
Role	Off-Broadway 2024
N	Holland Taylor
A	Ana Villafañe
