= Lupe Ontiveros =

American actress (1942–2012)

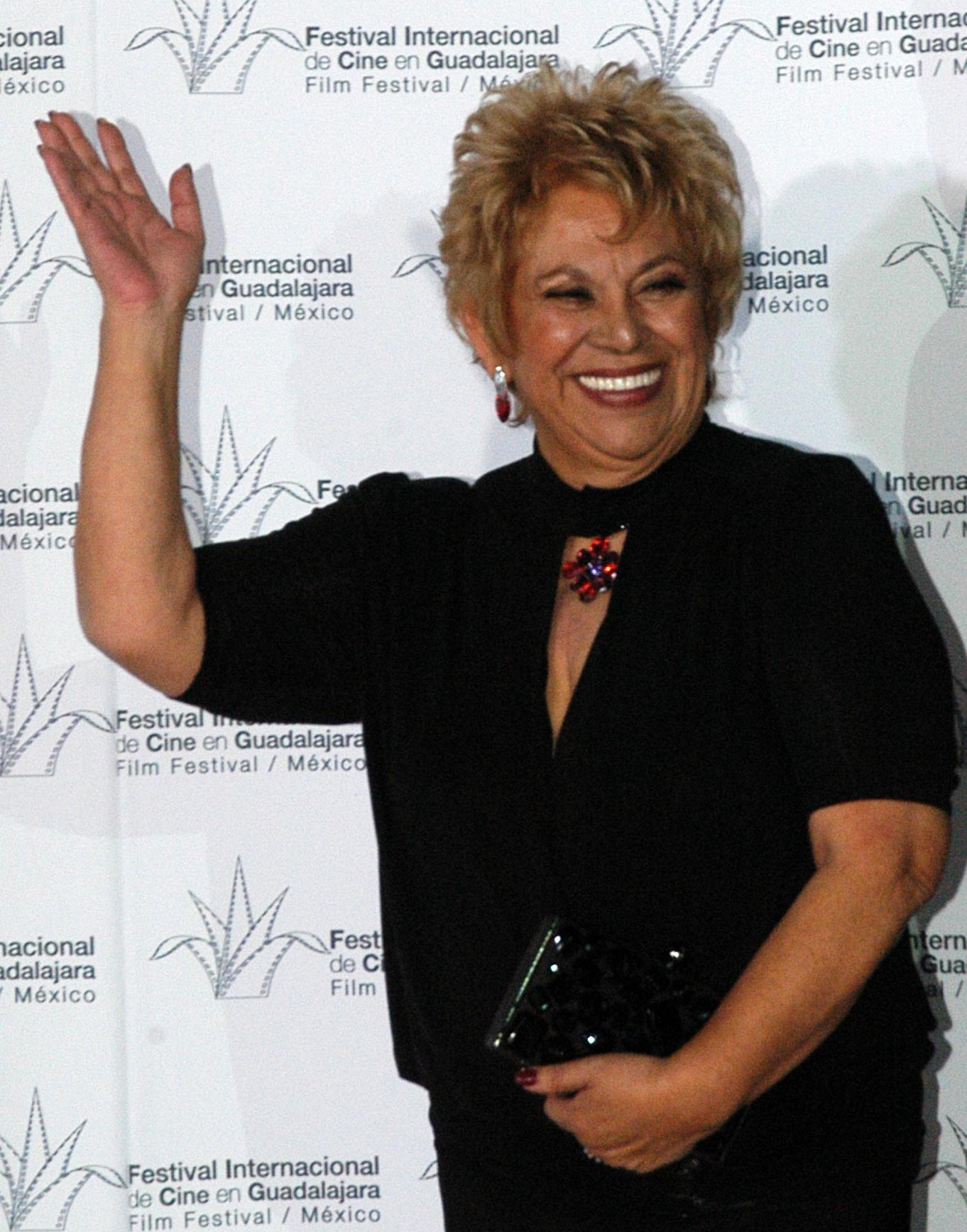
- Ontiveros in 2008
- Born: Guadalupe Moreno; September 17, 1942; El Paso, Texas, U.S.
- Died: July 26, 2012 (aged 69); Whittier, California, U.S.
- Resting place: Rose Hills Memorial Park
- Occupation: Actress
- Years active: 1968–2012
- Spouse: Elías Ontiveros (m. 1966)
- Children: 3

Guadalupe Ontiveros (née Moreno; September 17, 1942 – July 26, 2012) was an American actress best known for portraying Rosalita in The Goonies, and Yolanda Saldívar in the film Selena. She acted in numerous films and television shows. Ontiveros was nominated for an Emmy Award for her work on Desperate Housewives and received critical acclaim for her role in Chuck & Buck, for which Ontiveros won the National Board of Review award for Best Supporting Actress, and was also nominated for an Independent Spirit Award.

== Early life ==
Guadalupe Moreno was born on September 17, 1942, in El Paso, Texas, the daughter of Luz "Lucita" Castañón and Juan Moreno, middle-class Mexican immigrants who overcame a lack of formal education to become owners of a tortilla factory and two restaurants in El Paso. Lupe was raised Roman Catholic and graduated from El Paso High School and went on to study at Texas Woman's University in Denton, Texas, where she received a bachelor's degree in social work in 1964.

After marrying Elías Ontiveros in 1966, the couple moved to California to realize his dream of starting an automotive business. During a period of dissatisfaction with her career as a social worker, Ontiveros was trying to decide whether to go back to school for a nursing degree when she saw an article about a need for local film extras. With her husband's encouragement, Ontiveros took the job and parlayed it into a long stage and screen career. Prior to acting, she had worked for 18 years as a social worker, and Ontiveros continued as an activist with many of the same causes with which she worked in that profession, such as domestic violence prevention and AIDS awareness and prevention.

== Career ==
=== Film ===
Ontiveros once estimated that she had played a maid at least 150 times on stage and screen; Ontiveros wanted to see more diverse roles available to Latina actors, noting: "I'm proud to represent those hands that labor in this country. I've given every maid I've ever portrayed soul and heart." In part because of her history in this role, Ontiveros was chosen as the narrator for the documentary Maid in America.

One of her most prominent early film roles was in the 1983 Gregory Nava film El Norte, in which Ontiveros played a seamstress and maid who acts as mentor to a newly arrived immigrant girl from Guatemala. In a 2004 interview with the Dominican newspaper Listin Diario, Ontiveros called El Norte "the film that always will remain in me... [it] tells the immigrants' story" when asked to name her favorite film from her long career. Ontiveros played the housekeeper, Rosalita, a Spanish-speaking maid hired to assist in the packing and moving of the Walsh family in the hit adventure film The Goonies (1985) and a housekeeper in Dolly Dearest (1992). Ontiveros also had a notable cameo appearance in Blood In Blood Out (1993) as Carmen, a drug dealer who Paco (Benjamin Bratt) busts in a sting operation as an undercover cop pretending to be a drug dealer.

Ontiveros worked with Nava in subsequent films, including My Family/Mi Familia (1995) and Selena (1997). In the latter film, she portrayed Yolanda Saldívar, the murderer of Tejano superstar Selena. Long after the film was released, Ontiveros would still reportedly be "hissed" at by Selena fans while in public. Ontiveros also appeared in the Academy Award-winning film As Good as It Gets.

In 2000, Ontiveros was featured in the film Chuck & Buck, in which she played Beverly, a tough theater director who puts on a play written by one of the film's main characters. Ontiveros said in multiple interviews that she accepted the role even before seeing the script, solely on the basis of being asked to play a character who was not defined by Hispanic ethnicity. For that role, Ontiveros was nominated for Best Supporting Actress in a Motion Picture at the 2000 Independent Spirit Awards.

During her acting career, Ontiveros participated in the web series Los Americans (2011), which is characterized by having a multigenerational focus, a middle-class family living in Los Angeles. During the series, she participated with Esai Morales, Tony Plana, Yvonne DeLaRosa, JC Gonzalez, Raymond Cruz and Ana Villafañe.

Ontiveros co-starred with America Ferrera in the 2002 film Real Women Have Curves, as the overbearing mother of Ferrera's character. Her performance received excellent reviews and earned Ontiveros and her co-star a Special Jury Prize at the prestigious Sundance Film Festival. Ontiveros and Ferrera appeared together again in the family comedy Our Family Wedding. Ontiveros continued to work in the studio and independent films, such as This Christmas in 2007 and My Uncle Rafael in 2012.

=== Television ===
Ontiveros had a recurring role in the 2004–05 season of American prime time soap opera series Desperate Housewives as Juanita Solis, Gabrielle's suspicious mother-in-law. She received an Emmy nomination as Best Guest Actress in a Comedy Series for this role. In 2004, Ontiveros also began a role as Abuela Elena, the grandmother of the title characters in the animated PBS children's series Maya & Miguel. The multicultural and bilingual series later introduced a deaf character, Marco, after a sign language-themed episode was suggested by the actress, who had two deaf adult sons.

Ontiveros was a star of The WB's Greetings from Tucson, playing the grandmother in an upwardly mobile family of mixed Irish and Mexican heritage. She also had recurring guest roles in the series Veronica's Closet, for which Ontiveros won an ALMA Award in 1998, and in the soap opera Pasadena. She was a guest star in Hill Street Blues, Red Shoe Diaries, Resurrection Blvd., Cory in the House and King of the Hill, among other series.

=== Stage ===
After deciding she wanted an acting career, Ontiveros began in earnest, following up full-day sessions at her first career with evening work at Nosotros, a community theater in Los Angeles. In 1978, Ontiveros was cast as Dolores in Luis Valdez's historic play Zoot Suit in her first major theatrical role. Ontiveros went on to reprise the role on Broadway—it was the first Mexican American theatrical production ever to play there—and in the 1982 film version. Ontiveros was also a founding member of the Latino Theater Company.

== Personal life ==
Ontiveros and her husband, Elías, had three sons: Alejandro, Elias, and Nicholas. They resided in Pico Rivera, California.

== Death ==
Ontiveros died on July 26, 2012, at Presbyterian Hospital in Whittier, California at the age of 69 after a battle with liver cancer. After a funeral at St. Hilary Church of Perpetual Adoration in Pico Rivera, she was buried in Rose Hills Memorial Park.

== Filmography ==
=== Film ===
Year	Title	Role	Notes
1977	The World's Greatest Lover	Lupe	
1978	The Boss' Son	Mary	
1978	The Big Fix	Hatti	
1978	California Suite	Miss Mara	
1980	Cheech & Chong's Next Movie	Lupe	As Lupe M. Ontiveros
1981	Zoot Suit	Dolores	
1982	The Border	Mme Loupe	
1983	El Norte	Nacha	
1985	Little Treasure	Ellen, Market Voice #1	
1985	The Goonies	Rosalita	
1987	The Rosary Murders	Sophie	
1987	Born in East L.A.	Ruby	
1990	A Show of Force	Pepita	
1991	Dolly Dearest	Camilla	
1991	How Else Am I Supposed to Know I'm Still Alive?	Lupe	Short
1991	La Pastorela	Chelsea	
1992	Universal Soldier	Bev	
1993	Blood In Blood Out	Carmen	
1993	La carpa	Bev	
1995	My Family	Irene	
1995	...And The Earth Did Not Swallow Him	Doña Rosa	
1997	Selena	Yolanda Saldívar	
1997	As Good as It Gets	Nora	
1999	The Brave	Maria	
1999	Candyman: Day of the Dead	Abuela	Direct-to-video
2000	The Egg Plant Lady	Connie	
2000	Chuck & Buck	Beverly Franco	
2000	Luminarias	Tia Tonia	
2000	Picking Up the Pieces	Constancia	
2000	Strippers	Credit Message	
2001	Gabriela	Grandma Josie	
2001	Storytelling	Consuelo	Segment: "Non-Fiction"
2001	La olla	Old Lady	
2002	Real Women Have Curves	Carmen Garcia	
2002	Passionada	Angelica Amonte	
2007	Tortilla Heaven	Adelfa	
2007	Dark Mirror	Grace	
2007	This Christmas	Rosie	
2007	Universal Signs	Claire	
2008	Days of Wrath	Anita Terrazas	
2009	Hacia la vida	Soledad	Short
2009	Crawlspace	Susan French	Short
2010	Our Family Wedding	Momma Cecilia	
2011	Beverly Hills Chihuahua 2	Mrs. Cortez	Direct-to-video

=== Television ===
Year	Title	Role	Notes
1976	Charlie's Angels	Mary the Maid	Episode: "The Killing Kind"
1977	Eight Is Enough	Mariana	Episode: "All's Fair in Love and War"
1977–1978	Alice	Maria Fernanadez	2 episodes
1978	Soap	Connie	10 episodes
1978–1980	The White Shadow	Mrs. Gomez	3 episodes
1980	B. J. and the Bear	Amelia	Episode: "The Girls of Hollywood High"
1981–1984	Hill Street Blues	Mrs. Uribe	3 episodes
1982	American Playhouse	Danielle	Episode: "Seguin"
1982	ABC Afterschool Special	Mrs. Jane Nunez	Episode: "But It's Not My Fault"
1984	a.k.a. Pablo	Mrs.Jane Alvarez	Episode: "The Whole Enchilada"
1984	Jessie	Mary Velasco	Episode: "Pilot"
1986	Fame	Mrs. Avery Castillo	Episode: "The Inheritance"
1986	When the Bough Breaks	Cruz	Television film
1987	I Married Dora	Marie	2 episodes
1988	Who's the Boss?	Margarita	Episode: "Housekeepers Unite"
1988	CBS Schoolbreak Special	Mrs. Jane Rojas	Episode: "Gangs"
1988	Punky Brewster	Mrs. Jane Aragon	Episode: "What's Your Sign?"
1988	Hallmark Hall of Fame	Jane	Minor role
1989	Those She Left Behind	Rosa	Television film
1990	Grand Slam	Grandma Gomez	4 episodes
1991	Great Performances	Parranda (pastore)	Episode: "La pastorela"
1992	Tales from the Crypt	Madame Leona	Episode: "Seance"
1993	Rio Diablo	Ducna	Television film
1993	Dudley	Marta	5 episodes
1996	Red Shoe Diaries	Lupe	Episode: "Juarez"
1996	Caroline in the City	Rosa	Episode: "Caroline and the Kid"
1997	Dave's World	Martha	Episode: "Tropical Depression"
1997	Veronica's Closet	Louisa	4 episodes
2000–2002	The Brothers García	Abuelita Maria	3 episodes
2001–2002	Pasadena	Pilar	4 episodes
2002	King of the Hill	Anne	Voice, episode: "The Substitute Spanish Prisoner"
2002	Leap of Faith	Lupe	Episode: "The Balls Game"
2002	Resurrection Blvd.	Lupe	Episode: "La Guera de Bibi"
2002–2003	Greetings from Tucson	Magdalena Tiant	22 episodes
2002	Mr. St. Nick	Tia Sophia	Television film
2004	30 Days Until I'm Famous	Rosa Moreno	Television film
2004–2007	Maya & Miguel	Abuela Elena	Voice
2004, 2012	Desperate Housewives	Juanita 'Mama' Solis	8 episodes
2005	Reba	Penny	Episode: "Reba and the Nanny"
2005	Testing Bob	Secretary	Television film
2005	Mind of Mencia	Carlos's Mom	
2006	A Girl Like Me: The Gwen Araujo Story	Mami	Television film
2008	El Superstar: The Unlikely Rise of Juan Frances	Nena	
2008	Weeds	Sister Helen	Episode: Little Boats"
2009	Family Guy	Emily	Voice, episode: "We Love You Conrad"
2009	Southland	Marta Ruiz	Episode: "Derailed"
2009	Reaper	Grandma Ellen	2 episodes
2010	Party Down	Mrs. Madge Gomez	Episode: "Steve Guttenberg's Birthday"
2011	Los Americans	Lucia Valenzuela	8 episodes
2012	Rob	Abuelita Dana	8 episodes
2012	Common Law	Margie Lopez	Episode: "Ride-Along"
