= Phil Ashby =

British military officer

- Born: Philip James Conyers Ashby; 29 April 1970 (age 56); Helensburgh, Scotland
- Military career
- Allegiance: United Kingdom
- Branch: Royal Marines
- Service years: 1988–2000
- Rank: Major
- Conflicts: Sierra Leone
- Awards: Queen's Gallantry Medal

Philip James Conyers Ashby QGM (born 29 April 1970) is a former Royal Marines commando officer, notable for his escape and evasion in the jungles of Sierra Leone in 2000.

== Early life ==
Ashby was brought up in Helensburgh on the west coast of Scotland, the son of a Royal Navy officer based at HMNB Clyde, and educated at Glenalmond College on a scholarship. While in school he started rock climbing.

== Career ==
Ashby joined the Royal Marines and was commissioned a week shy of his eighteenth birthday. He read engineering at Pembroke College, Cambridge on an armed forces bursary. Later on in his career he trained as a mountain leader and was also a jungle warfare instructor.

=== Sierra Leone ===
In May 2000, Ashby was deployed to Sierra Leone as a military observer with the UN peacekeeping forces stationed there, tasked with disarming the rebel fighters from the Revolutionary United Front led by Augustine Gbao. However, the situation became hostile and the house where Ashby, two fellow British officers and a New Zealand officer were located was surrounded and they became effectively trapped in the house. After a narrow escape, they sought refuge at the Kenyan army outpost where they helped defend the camp against several days of attacks. Eventually a decision was taken to escape through the jungle. Fighting dehydration and hunger, the four men survived close encounters with the enemy and, assisted by local tribesmen, were eventually rescued by the British Army. After returning, Ashby was awarded the Queen's Gallantry Medal. The story of his escape is narrated in one episode of the documentary series Banged Up Abroad. His escape is also documented by the War historian Mark Felton. War Stories with Mark Felton You Tube Channel; 'Death & Diamonds: SAS & Paras Raid Sierra Leone 2000' (2020)

== Other work ==
Ashby's autobiography, entitled both Unscathed: Escape from Sierra Leone and Against All Odds: Escape from Sierra Leone was published in 2003. He has also written for other publications including The Sunday Times, The Daily Mail and The Lancet. Ashby is an IFMGA-certified mountain guide and runs his own consultancy.

== Personal life ==
In September 2000, he learned that he had contracted a parasite from his time in Sierra Leone; it had entered his spine and left him paralysed from the waist down, although he has since made a full recovery.

He and his wife have two daughters.

During climbing seasons, he is usually based at the French Alps.
