= Esai Morales =

American actor (born 1962)

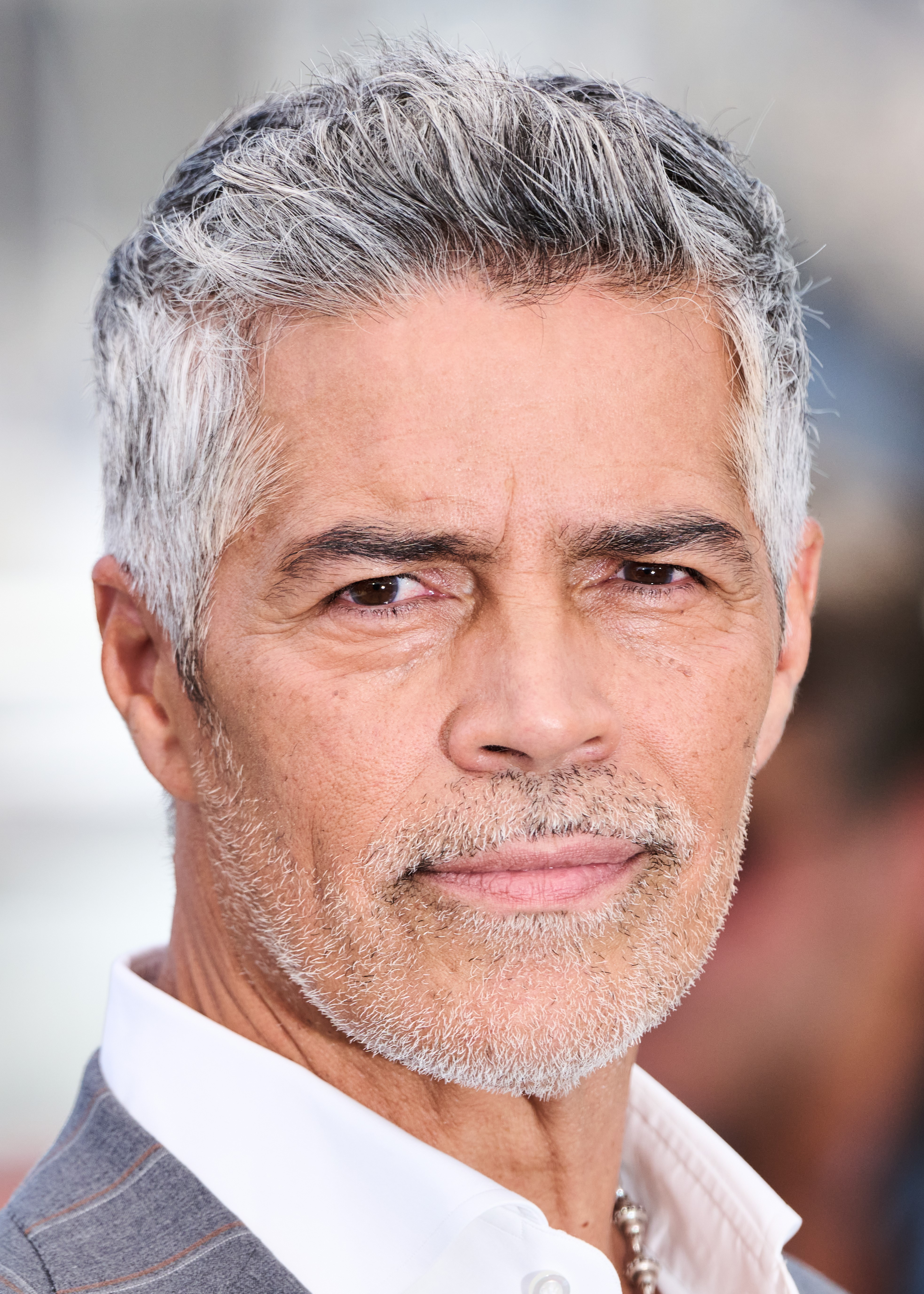
- Morales in 2025
- Born: Esai Manuel Morales Jr. October 1, 1962 (age 64); Brooklyn, New York, U.S.
- Education: High School of Performing Arts
- Occupations: Actor; producer; director; musician
- Years active: 1982–present
- Spouse: Elvimar Silva (m. 2010)
- Children: 1

Esai Manuel Morales Jr. (born October 1, 1962) is an American actor. He has had notable roles in the films Bad Boys with Sean Penn and La Bamba with Lou Diamond Phillips. His television roles include the PBS 2002 drama series American Family, the Showtime series Resurrection Blvd. (2000–2002), portraying Lt. Tony Rodriguez on NYPD Blue (2001–2004), played Major Edward Beck in the second season of the post -apocalyptic series Jericho opposite Skeet Ulrich (2006), Joseph Adama in the science fiction series Caprica (2009–2010), Camino del Rio in the Netflix original series Ozark (2017), and the DC Comics supervillain Slade Wilson / Deathstroke in the superhero series Titans (2019).

Morales appeared as Gabriel, the main antagonist in the 2023 spy action film Mission: Impossible – Dead Reckoning Part One opposite Tom Cruise, a role which he reprised in Mission: Impossible – The Final Reckoning in 2025.

== Early life ==
Of Puerto Rican descent, Morales was born in Brooklyn to Esai Morales Sr., a welder, and Iris Margarita (née Declet), a union activist involved with the International Ladies' Garment Workers' Union. Morales began his pursuit of an acting career by attending the High School of Performing Arts in Manhattan.

== Career ==
His first professional performances were in theater and television in New York. His first major film was Bad Boys (1983), about rival teenagers sentenced to a juvenile correction facility. Morales appeared in a 1985 episode of the TV series Fame. He co-starred with Burt Lancaster in the 1986 NBC miniseries On Wings of Eagles, playing the Iranian Rashid, the hero of a true story about Ross Perot. Morales also appeared in Miami Vice, The Equalizer, and 24.

He played Bob Morales, the real-life ex-convict and biker half-brother of 1950s rock and roll singer Ritchie Valens, in La Bamba (1987). He also played Nicholas Walker in Ultraviolet (1992). Some of his other roles have reflected his socio-political interests, such as The Burning Season in 1994, My Family/Mi Familia in 1995, The Disappearance of Garcia Lorca (1997), and Southern Cross (1999). In the latter three films, as well as in others such as Bloodhounds of Broadway (1989) and Rapa-Nui (1994), Morales saw increased amounts of screen time, starting with a role in the Pauly Shore film In The Army Now (1994). He portrayed a police officer in the film Dogwatch (1996) and Father Herrera in The Virgin of Juarez (2006).

In the 1990s, he guest-starred on episodes of The Outer Limits, Tales from the Crypt, and two shorter-lived series, L.A. Doctors and The Hunger. He appeared in a two-part episode of Family Law in 2000. He was part of the main cast of the long-running series NYPD Blue for three and a half seasons, from 2001 to 2004, as the head of the 15th precinct detective squad.

He played a drug dealer named Lulu in the 2002 film Paid in Full. In 2005, he was a voice actor in the video game True Crime: New York City.

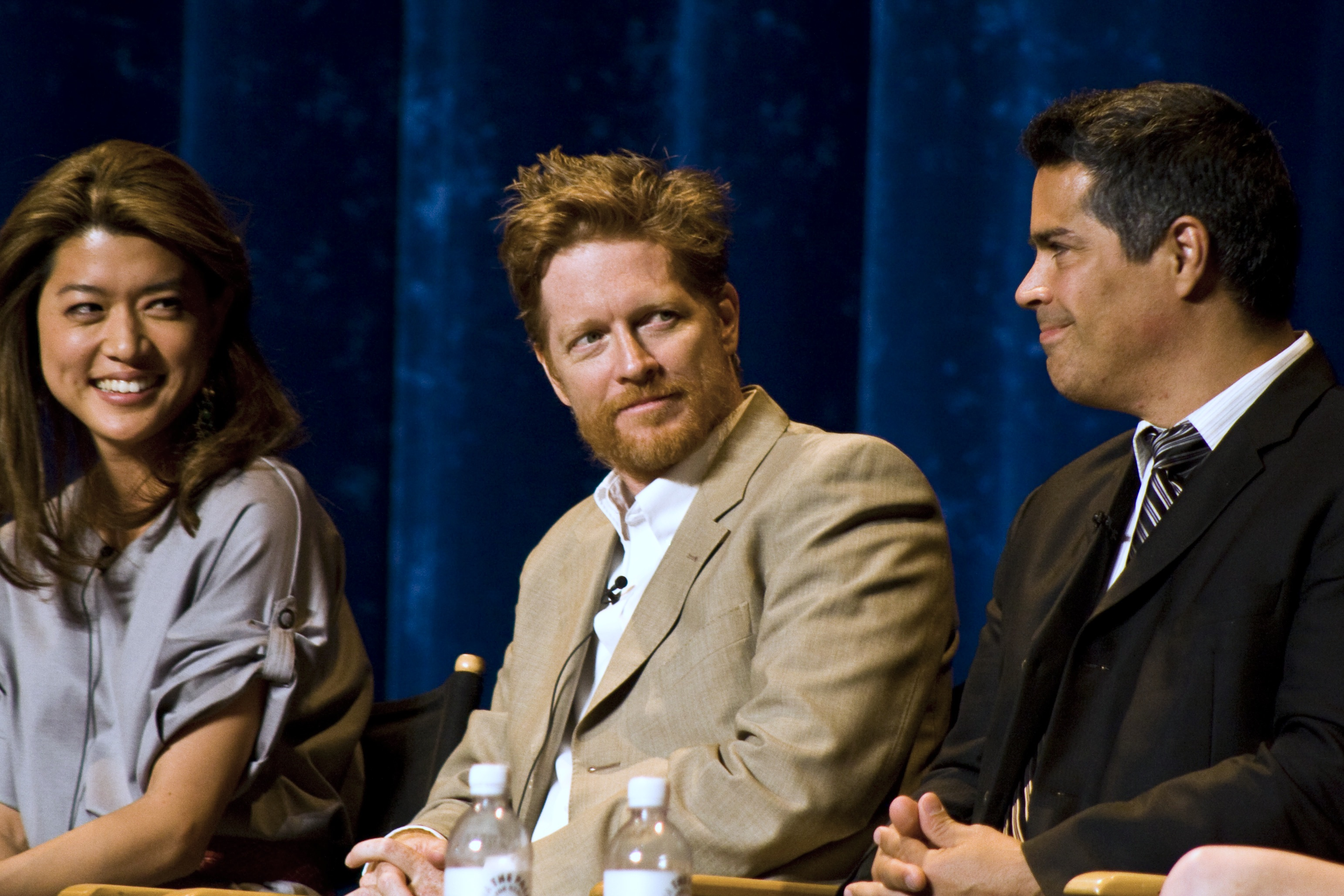
Morales (right) with Grace Park (left) and Eric Stoltz (center)

Morales was cast in the film American Fusion (2005), and in 2006, he joined the cast of the Fox series Vanished, as FBI agent Michael Tyner; the series ran for one season. In 2007, Morales appeared in an episode of the USA Network drama series Burn Notice, as a Cuban shopkeeper being shaken down for "protection" money by local criminals. In 2008, Morales had a role in the CBS drama Jericho, as Major Edward Beck. He appeared in all seven episodes of the shortened second season. That same year, he appeared in Kill Kill Faster Faster, a film noir based on the novel of the same name by Joel Rose.

Morales played the role of Joseph Adama in the science fiction television series Caprica – Syfy's prequel to the series Battlestar Galactica. The series, though highly anticipated, only ran for one season in 2010. In 2009, he served as an official festival judge for the Noor Iranian Film Festival in Los Angeles.

In 2011, Morales starred in the drama film Gun Hill Road as Enrique, and in the web drama Los Americans airing on PIC.tv. Morales worked with Tony Plana, Yvonne DeLaRosa, Lupe Ontiveros, and JC Gonzalez in Los Americans, an Internet program launched in 2011.

In 2015, Robert Rodriguez cast him as Lord Amancio Malvado for the second season of horror series From Dusk till Dawn: The Series, which was followed in 2017 by a main role in the first season of the Netflix original series Ozark, and then in 2019 in an antagonist role for the second season of the DC Universe superhero series Titans as Slade Wilson / Deathstroke.

Morales appeared in Mission: Impossible – Dead Reckoning Part One as Gabriel, the film's main villain, a role which he reprised in its sequel Mission: Impossible – The Final Reckoning.

In 2023, Morales starred in the western thriller Cottonmouth, which is set for release in 2024.

== Awards and honors ==
In 2005, Morales (along with Mercedes Ruehl) received the Rita Moreno HOLA Award for Excellence from the Hispanic Organization of Latin Actors (HOLA).

He received the Lifetime Achievement Award from the Arpa Foundation for Film, Music and Art, for his impact as an actor and role model.

== Activism ==
Morales has described himself as an "actorvist", primarily as one of the founders of the National Hispanic Foundation for the Arts, taking inspiration from his mother, who was an organizer for the International Ladies' Garment Workers' Union. He is also interested in environmental issues and was a founding board member of E.C.O. (Earth Communications Office).

In a February 28, 2007, all-star benefit reading of The Gift of Peace at UCLA's Freud Playhouse, he portrayed a hopeful member of a struggling immigrant family. The play was an open appeal and fundraiser for passage of U.S. House Resolution 808, which sought to establish a Cabinet-level "Department of Peace" in the U.S. government, to be funded by a two percent diversion of the Pentagon's annual budget.

== Personal life ==
Morales is a vegetarian. He has a daughter, born in 2010 with his girlfriend Elvimar Silva.

== Filmography ==
Key
†	Denotes works that have not yet been released

=== Film ===
Year	Title	Role	Notes
1982	Forty Deuce	Mitchell	
1983	Bad Boys	Paco Moreno	
1985	Rainy Day Friends	Neekos Valdez	
1987	La Bamba	Roberto 'Bob' Morales	
1987	The Principal	Raymundo 'Raymi' Rojas	
1989	Bloodhounds of Broadway	Jack 'Handsome Jack'	
1990	Naked Tango	Zico Borenstein	
1992	Freejack	'Ripper'	
1992	Ultraviolet	Nicholas Walker	
1993	The Waiter	Julius	Short
1993	Living and Working in Space: The Countdown Has Begun	Kenny	Video
1994	Rapa-Nui	Make	
1994	In the Army Now	Sergeant Stern	
1994	Don't Do It	Charles	
1995	My Family	'Chucho'	
1995	Scorpion Spring	Astor	
1996	Livers Ain't Cheap	Collin	
1996	The Disappearance of Garcia Lorca	Ricardo	
1996	Dogwatch	Murrow	Video
1998	The Wonderful Ice Cream Suit	Dominguez	
1999	Southern Cross	Philip Solano	
1999	American Virgin	Jim The Director	
2000	Doomsday Man	Mike	
2000	Spin Cycle	Nickens	
2002	The Adventures of Tom Thumb and Thumbelina	Vergas Mouse (voice)	Video
2002	Paid in Full	Luis "Lulu" Lujano	
2005	Once Upon a Wedding	Pineda	
2006	The Virgin of Juarez	Father Herrera	
2006	Fast Food Nation	Tony	
2006	How to Go Out on a Date in Queens	Frankie	
2008	Kill Kill Faster Faster	Markie	
2009	The Line	Pelon	
2010	Cherry	Wes	
2010	King of the Avenue	Natas	
2011	Gun Hill Road	Enrique	
2012	Atlas Shrugged: Part II	Francisco D'Anconia	
2013	Playin' for Love	Principle Jose Martin	
2014	Jarhead 2: Field of Fire	Captain Jones	Video
2015	Spare Parts	Mr. Santillan	
2016	Never Back Down: No Surrender	Hugo Vega	Video
2018	Superfly	Adalberto Gonzalez	
2018	Imprisoned	Governor Mandera	
2019	The Wall of Mexico	Henry Arista	
2021	Senior Moment	Diego Lozana	
2022	Art of Love	Professor/Writer	
2022	Queen of Manhattan	Papi	
2022	Master Gardener	Oscar Neruda	
2023	Mission: Impossible – Dead Reckoning Part One	Gabriel	
2024	Crescent City	Luke	
2025	Mission: Impossible – The Final Reckoning	Gabriel	
2026	War Machine	Torres	
TBD	The Latin from Manhattan †	Papi	Post-production
TBD	Tumor †	Gibson	Post-production

=== Television ===
Year	Title	Role	Notes
1984	ABC Afterschool Special	Miguel Rados	Episode: "The Great Love Experiment"
1985	The Equalizer	Officer Miguel Canterra	Episode: "Lady Cop"
1985	Fame	George	Episode: "Savage Streets"
1985	Miami Vice	Pete Romano	Episode: "The Home Invaders"
1986	On Wings of Eagles	Rashid	Episode: "Part I & II"
1987	Miami Vice	Felipe Cruz	Episode: "God's Work"
1989	The Twilight Zone	Jesse Cardiff	Episode: "A Game of Pool"
1991–92	The Legend of Prince Valiant	Various Roles (voice)	Recurring cast (season 1)
1992	Bay City Story	Jim Duran	TV movie
1994	Tales from the Crypt	'Puck'	Episode: "The Bribe"
1994	The Burning Season	Jair	TV movie
1995	Deadlocked: Escape from Zone 14	Tony Archer	TV movie
1996	Dying to Be Perfect: The Ellen Hart Pena Story	Federico Peña	TV movie
1997	The Outer Limits	Frank Kelton	Episode: "Heart's Desire"
1997	The Hunger	Tony	Episode: "I'm Dangerous Tonight"
1998	Adventures from the Book of Virtues	Guillermo (voice)	Episode: "Charity"
1998	Circle of Deceit	Jeff Silva	TV movie
1999	L.A. Doctors	Vince Duralde	Episode: "The Life Lost in Living"
1999	Atomic Train	Noris MacKenzie	Episode: "Part I & II"
2000	A Family in Crisis: The Elian Gonzales Story	Juan Miguel Gonzalez	TV movie
2000	Family Law	Mr. Santiago	Episode: "Telling Lies, Conclusion"
2000–02	Resurrection Blvd.	Paco Corrales	Recurring cast (season 1-2), guest (season 3)
2001–04	NYPD Blue	Lieutenant Tony Rodriguez	Main cast (season 8-11)
2002	American Family	Esteban Gonzalez	Recurring cast (season 1)
2002	George Lopez	Manny Lopez	Episode: "Who's Your Daddy?"
2002–03	Dora the Explorer	Papi (voice)	Recurring cast (season 2)
2005	Heartless	Rick Benes/David Lopez	TV movie
2005	Freddie	Carlos	Episode: "The Courtship of Freddie's Father"
2006	Vanished	Michael Tyner	Recurring cast
2007	24: Day 6 Debrief	Agent Jorge Ramirez	Recurring cast (season 6)
2007	Burn Notice	Ernie Paseo	Episode: "Broken Rules"
2008	Jericho	Major Edward Beck	Recurring cast (season 2)
2009–10	Caprica	Joseph Adama	Main cast
2010	CSI: Miami	Stephen Madsen	Episode: "All Fall Down"
2011	Los Americans	Leandro 'Lee' Valenzuela	Main cast
2011	We Have Your Husband	Eduardo Valseca	TV movie
2011–12	Fairly Legal	District Attorney Aaron Davidson	Guest (season 1), recurring cast (season 2)
2012	Seattle Superstorm	Tom	TV movie
2012	Law & Order: Special Victims Unit	Jimmy Vasquez	Episode: "Home Invasions"
2013	Magic City	Carlos "El Tiburon" Ruiz	Recurring cast (season 2)
2013	Major Crimes	Deputy Diaz	Episode: "Jailbait"
2013	Teachers	Manny	TV movie
2013–15	Criminal Minds	Section Chief Mateo 'Matt' Cruz	Guest (season 9), recurring cast (season 10)
2014	Cleaners	Father Brooks	Recurring cast (season 2)
2015	The Brink	President Julian Navarro	Main cast
2015	From Dusk till Dawn: The Series	Lord Amancio Malvado	Main cast (season 2)
2015	Mozart in the Jungle	Juan Delgado	Recurring cast (season 2)
2015–16	Blue Bloods	Sergeant Trey Delgado	Guest cast (season 6-7)
2016	Casa Vita	Rodrigo Vita	TV movie
2016	Hit the Floor	Joe Desario	Episode: "Til Death Do Us Part"
2016	Adam Ruins Everything	Alfonso	Episode: "Adam Ruins Immigration"
2016–20	How to Get Away with Murder	Jorge Castillo	Recurring cast (season 3-4 & 6)
2017	Criminal Minds: Beyond Borders	Section Chief Mateo 'Matt' Cruz	Episode: "La Huesuda"
2017	Ozark	Camino Del Rio	Main cast (season 1)
2017	Chicago P.D.	Police Chief Lugo	Recurring cast (season 4), guest (season 5)
2018	Mars	Roland St. John	Recurring cast (season 2)
2018–19	NCIS: Los Angeles	NCIS Deputy Director Louis Ochoa	Recurring cast (season 10)
2019	Titans	Slade Wilson / Deathstroke	Main cast (season 2); 9 episodes
2020	Curb Your Enthusiasm	Francisco	Episode: "Artificial Fruit"
2025	Side Quest	Gustavo	Episode: "Fugue"

=== Video game ===
Year	Title	Voice role	Notes
2005	True Crime: New York City	Chief Victor Navarro	
