= Carlos Carrasco (actor) =

Panamanian actor

- Born: Panama
- Education: Canal Zone Junior College; Stephens College
- Occupation: Actor

Carlos Enrique Carrasco is a Panamanian actor.

== Personal life ==
Born in Panama, Carlos Enrique Carrasco grew up exposed to and enamored with US culture—as transplanted for the Panama Canal Zone—such as The Adventures of Ozzie and Harriet, Armed Forces Network, Bonanza, and The Honeymooners.

After graduating from a Panamanian Catholic school in the mid-to-late 1960s, Carrasco wanted to attend Canal Zone Junior College, and convinced his parents by saying he was interested in studying advertising and commercial art. There, he was first introduced working in theater. An instructor, who saw Carrasco's potential as a performer, secured him an acting scholarship at Stephens College. At age 20 or 21, he emigrated to the States and became one of eight male students at the private women's college in Columbia, Missouri.

== Performance credits ==
Carlos Carrasco film credits
Year	Title	Role	Citation(s)
1988	Crocodile Dundee II	Garcia	
1990	The Return of Superfly	Hector [Estrada]	
1991	The Fisher King	Doctor	
1991	In the Heat of Passion	Perez	
1992	Nails	Jose Acosta	
1993	Bound by Honor	Popeye	
1994	Speed	Ortiz	
1997	Anarchy TV	Clarence	
1998	Eruption	Marcos	
1999	One Man's Hero	Dominguez	
2000	Across the Line	Franco	
2001	Double Take	Captain Garcia	
2013	Parker	Norte	
2019	Turnover	Miguel	

Carlos Carrasco television credits
Year	Title	Role	Episode(s)	Citation(s)
1990	Hunter	Eduardo Rodriguez	The Nightmare"	
1994	Star Trek: Deep Space Nine	D'Ghor	"The House of Quark"	
1996	Star Trek: Deep Space Nine	Klingon officer	"Shattered Mirror"	
1998	Star Trek: Deep Space Nine	Krole	"Honor Among Thieves"	
1999	Angel	Natpudan	"I Fall to Pieces"	
2001	The Steve Harvey Show		"Mother and Child Reunion"	
2009	CSI: Crime Scene Investigation	Payaso Solitario	"Mascara"	
2009	Parks and Recreation	Antonio	"Sister City"	
