= Sister City (Parks and Recreation) =

- Parks and Recreation episode
- Episode no.: Season 2 Episode 5
- Directed by: Michael Schur
- Written by: Alan Yang
- Original air date: October 15, 2009

Guest appearances
- Fred Armisen as Raul; Carlos Carrasco as Antonio; Federico Dordei as Elvis; JC Gonzalez as Jhonny; Eric Edelstein as Lawrence; Jim O'Heir as Jerry Gergich; Retta as Donna Meagle; Loudon Wainwright III as Barry

Episode chronology
← Previous "Practice Date"	Next → "Kaboom"
- Parks and Recreation season 2

"Sister City" is the fifth episode of the second season of Parks and Recreation, and the eleventh overall episode of the series. It originally aired on NBC in the United States on October 15, 2009. In the episode, Leslie welcomes a delegation from Venezuela, who act disrespectfully toward Pawnee and the United States.

The episode was written by Alan Yang and directed by series co-creator Michael Schur. It featured Saturday Night Live performer Fred Armisen in a guest appearance as Raul, the head of the Venezuelan delegation. According to Nielsen Media Research, the episode was seen by 4.69 million household viewers, a drop from the previous week. The episode received highly positive reviews and is widely considered one of the best Parks and Recreation episodes.

== Plot ==
Leslie and the Pawnee parks department prepare for a visit by park department officials from Boraqua, Pawnee's sister city in Venezuela. Leslie warns her co-workers the Venezuelan government officials will likely be poor, simple people. Later, the Venezuelan delegation arrives, headed by their parks department vice director Raul Alejandro Bastilla Pedro de Veloso de Maldonado, the Vice-director Ejecutivo del Diputado del Departamento de Parques, L.G.V., Antonio, Jhonny and Elvis. There are cultural clashes right away, like when they mistake Tom for a servant and order him to get their bags. They also mistakenly believe they can choose any woman to have sex with; they all favor Donna. Raul and Leslie exchange gifts during a meet-and-greet party, the Venezuelans giving a much more expensive gift, a golden handgun. Where Raul and the Venezuelans act condescendingly toward the Pawnee residents, making offensive remarks about the town and mocking the gifts Leslie gives them, Leslie attempts to remain understanding. They continue to give orders to Tom, who follows along because they give him large cash tips.

The Venezuelan intern Jhonny falls in love with April Ludgate, who convinces him she is feared and very powerful, yet continues to refuse his advances. Jhonny sends her his car to pick her up, but she uses it to go to a movie with her friends. Meanwhile, Leslie tells the Venezuelans that she is seeking to raise $35,000 to fill in a pit to make a park. Raul and his colleagues start to laugh, telling her they have so much money from oil, they can build whatever they want. Leslie, who is growing increasingly annoyed with the Venezuelans, decides to take them to Pawnee's nicest park with hopes of impressing them. Instead, they are disgusted, and Raul mistakes the park for the aforementioned pit. Leslie later takes them to a public meeting to show them democracy in action, but all of the citizens shout angry and annoyed questions at Leslie. An unimpressed Raul wonders where the armed guards are to take the protesters to jail. When Raul tells Leslie they live like kings in Venezuela and answer to nobody, she explodes in anger, insulting their uniforms and Hugo Chavez. The Venezuelans storm out.

Leslie calls a meeting and apologizes to Raul, who in turn apologizes as well and offers Leslie a check for $35,000 to fill in the pit. Leslie fears it may be "dirty money", but accepts. During a photo opportunity later, Raul sets up a video camera and asks Leslie to say "Viva Venezuela" and "Viva Chavez" to it. Against her wishes, Leslie reluctantly does so. When Raul starts speaking Spanish to the camera, Leslie asks April to translate, and learns Raul is discussing his "Committee to Humiliate and Shame America". A furious Leslie tears up the $35,000 check and shouts "Viva America", prompting Raul to declare Pawnee is no longer their sister city and storm out. Leslie insists she will raise the money to build the park without them and Tom, inspired by her example, secretly puts all the tip money he made from the Venezuelans into the park donation jar. The episode ends with Leslie and Tom later receiving an online video from April, who tells them she and Donna are vacationing with Jhonny at his Venezuelan palace, which is watched over by armed guards.

== Cast ==
- Fred Armisen as Raul
- Carlos Carrasco as Antonio
- Federico Dordei as Elvis
- JC Gonzalez as Jhonny
- Eric Edelstein as Lawrence
- Jim O'Heir as Jerry Gergich
- Retta as Donna Meagle
- Loudon Wainwright III as Barry

== Production ==
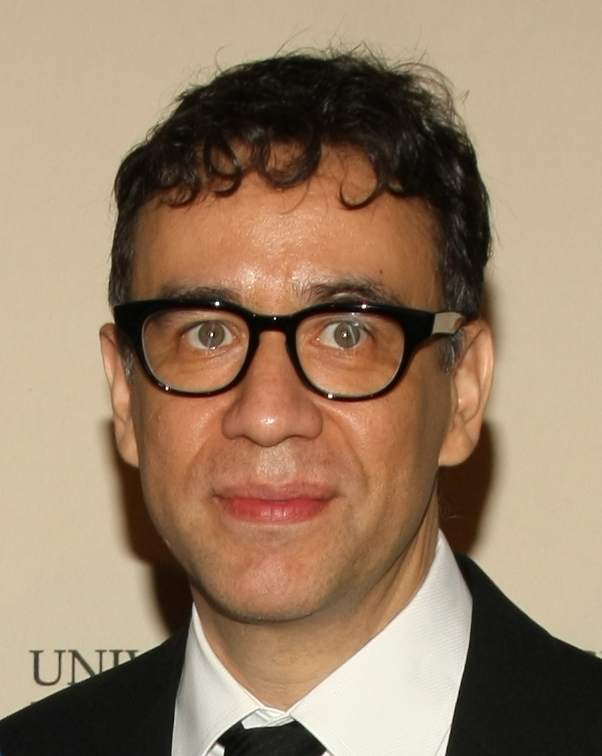
Comedian Fred Armisen portrayed Raul, the vice director of a Venezuelan parks department, in "Sister City".

"Sister City" was written by Alan Yang and directed by series co-creator Michael Schur. The episode featured comedian Fred Armisen in a guest appearance as Raul, the vice director of a Venezuelan parks department. Armisen was a cast member of NBC's sketch comedy show Saturday Night Live, where he previously worked with performer Poehler and writer Schur. Armisen has played Venezuelan characters before, and previously imitated President of Venezuela Hugo Chavez on Saturday Night Live. Armisen said he got into character by thinking about his uncle, who is from Venezuela. But he said it was not a difficult performance because "most of the joke is the uniform", which included a tan military-style jacket with medals, a red beret and a sash with the colors of the Venezuela flag. The uniform also included a fictional seal designed by Schur, which included an image of Chavez, machine guns, an oil tower, a lion and a parrot.

Schur said of the episode's plot, "They're very confused because in Venezuela the government is so powerful; their parks department travels with military escorts and motorcades and stuff. They have all the money in the world because of their oil and they (don't understand) why Pawnee's parks department is so rinky-dink." A fan of Parks and Recreation since its inception, Armisen said he laughed as soon as he read the script, and found it even funnier during the table read with the cast. After working with Armisen, Rashida Jones described him as "one of the funniest people on the planet".

Within a week of the episode's original broadcast, three deleted scenes from "Sister City" were made available on the official Parks and Recreation website. In the first 100-second clip, Ron talks about his hatred for socialism, and Raul says he fears Ron because of his mustache, which he said makes him "cower in fear" (repeatedly saying the word 'mustache'). In the second minute-long clip, Raul discusses the medals he received for his parks-related accomplishments, including "doing away with people making speeches in the parks", "organizing the garbage so it's not all over the place" and "looking at the leaves". In the third 100-second clip, Raul and the Venezuelans question why Leslie does not have a giant oil painting of herself in her office. After his final argument with Leslie, Tom refuses to follow Raul's orders to open the door for him, and Raul has trouble opening it because "it's been a while since I've done this".

== Cultural references ==
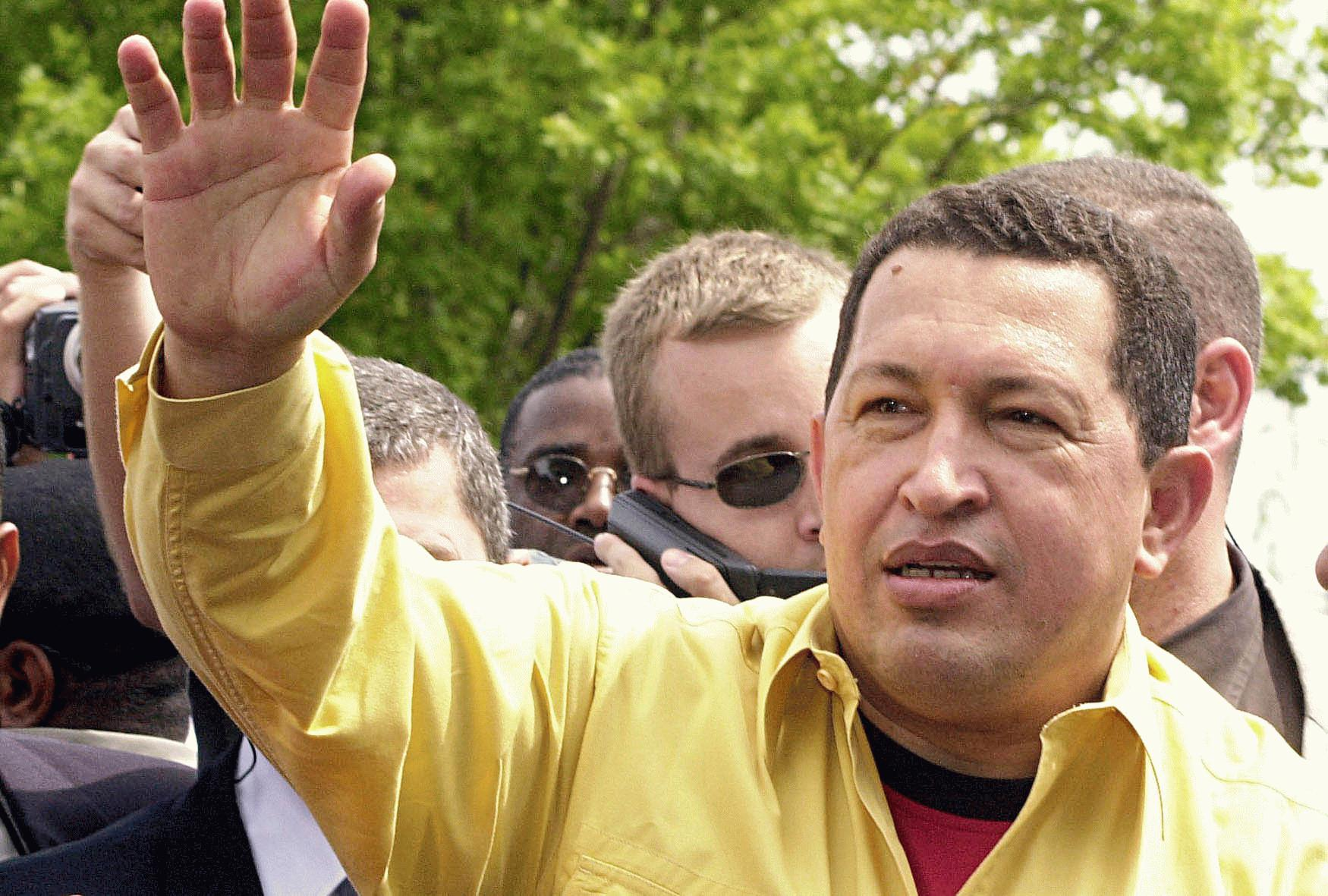
Hugo Chavez (pictured), former president of Venezuela, is portrayed in a negative light in "Sister City".

"Sister City" largely portrayed Chavez and his socialist ideology in a negative light. The script portrays the Venezuelans as belittling and contemptuous toward Americans. They repeatedly claim Pawnee and the United States are inferior compared to the power and splendor they are accustomed to in Venezuela. Their negative attitude toward Americans is particularly demonstrated by the name of their delegation, the Committee to Humiliate and Shame America, as well as the line from one of the delegates, "This is not personal. We just think you are weak and your city is disgusting."

While discussing how many television channels he gets in Venezuela, Raul said he already knows who wins Project Runway, a fashion design reality television show on the Bravo network. In trying to maintain composure in the face of insults from the Venezuelans, Leslie said she was following the example of U.S. Secretary of State Hillary Clinton, of whom she said, "Nobody takes a punch like her. She's the strongest, smartest punching bag in the world." Raul says his city is also a sister city to Kaesong, North Korea, which he said is "far nicer" than Pawnee.

== Reception ==
There's something really special about watching a show — particularly one you’ve been rooting for — begin to come together, learn from its mistakes, and grow into a formidable and wholly satisfying half hour of television. I'll just say it: Parks and Recreation is the best comedy on NBC right now.

— Henning Fog,
Entertainment Weekly

In its original American broadcast on October 15, 2009, "Sister City" was seen by 4.69 million household viewers, according to Nielsen Media Research. It was a drop from the previous week's episode, "Practice Date". "Sister City" received a 2.0 rating/6 share among viewers aged between 18 and 49. The episode received generally positive reviews. Entertainment Weekly writer Henning Fog said "Sister City" continued a trend of excellence in the second season that has established Parks and Recreation as NBC's best comedy. Fog said the episode also further expanded its characters, by showing Leslie is not a complete pushover and Tom is a kind person.

Salon writer Heather Havrilesky called the episode an "instant classic", and particularly praised the guest performance of Fred Armisen. She said the episode "benefits from the show's writers' increasing habit of giving everything from political scandals to lame local events the Onion treatment". Alan Sepinwall of The Star-Ledger said it was "another strong one", and said the Leslie character is growing less clueless and more three-dimensional. Robert Philpot of the Fort Worth Star-Telegram said he believed the show still too closely resembled The Office, but that "Sister City" "showed that Parks and Recreation can equal The Office for comic discomfort". Matt Fowler of IGN said the anti-American sentiment demonstrated by the Venezuelan delegation "was a funny twist that didn't completely wear itself out, although it came close". Fowler particularly praised Armisen, who he said risked overshadowing the regular cast, and the sardonic comedy of Plaza. Not all reviews were positive. The A.V. Club writer Leonard Pierce, who said he felt the second season had been excellent so far, described "Sister City" as "easily the weakest episode of the season, maybe the series". Pierce called the political overtones "ham-handed", the humor was too over-the-top, and the episode suffered from the absence of most of the supporting cast.

== DVD release ==
"Sister City", along with the other 23 second season episodes of Parks and Recreation, was released on a four-disc DVD set in the United States on November 30, 2010. The DVD included deleted scenes for each episode. It also included a commentary track for "Sister City" featuring Amy Poehler, Fred Armisen, Alan Yang and Michael Schur.
