= Eliadah McCord =

American woman (born 1973)

Eliadah "Lia" McCord (born March 27, 1973) is an American woman who was convicted of smuggling heroin in Bangladesh at the age of 18. She was subsequently sentenced to life in prison, but was pardoned after four years and six months at the request of Congressman Bill Richardson. McCord's story was documented on Raw TV's Banged Up Abroad (Locked Up Abroad in the United States)

== Biography ==
McCord grew up in Houston, Texas, United States. She left home when she was 18 years old and moved into an apartment with a friend. After a few months, they were becoming low on funds when McCord's roommate returned from a trip to Europe, claiming to have made $10,000 (USD) by smuggling diamonds. Intrigued, McCord agreed to meet her roommate's employer, but when she learned that not only would she be traveling to Bangladesh, but would also be smuggling drugs, she became reluctant. McCord's soon-to-be employer then doubled the payment to $20,000 and informed her that she would be smuggling drugs into Switzerland, not the US. McCord agreed. She learned that her roommate had also smuggled heroin, not diamonds, through an airport.

After two weeks, the last five days of which were spent at a five-star resort in Dhaka, unsure of when she would receive the drugs, McCord became impatient as her vacation visa was about to expire. According to McCord, as she was attempting to flee at the last minute, she was caught in the resort's lobby by the supplier, who then forced her into a cab and duct-taped 7 lbs of heroin to her body (per National Geographic's Locked Up Abroad – Bangladesh docudrama).

== Arrest and sentence ==
McCord stated in her interview on National Geographic's Locked Up Abroad that she was threatened by her supplier, as he dropped her at the airport. Afraid, and anxious to return home, McCord approached her gate. When she realized passengers were being searched physically, she rushed to the restroom to attempt to remove the packages. The heat made the duct tape melt and she was unable to remove it. She stated that she prayed and asked that she get through this, promising she would never do anything bad again. Upon exiting the restroom, McCord noticed the official was behind a curtain and could not see her. She attempted to go to the airplane without being searched. Mere steps away from success, the official came out of the room and called McCord back.

After being taken into custody, McCord was shocked to learn that the penalty for drug smuggling in Bangladesh was death. The police allegedly led McCord to believe that if she identified the supplier who gave her the heroin, all charges would be dropped and she would be allowed to go home. As an American teenager raised to trust the police, McCord perhaps took them at their word. She told Christian Reader Magazine that she had heard of extradition agreements and expected, at the very least, to be returned to the US once she led them to the supplier. Her good behavior in prison, and the fact that the judge did not believe McCord to be a frequent smuggler, resulted in McCord receiving a life sentence rather than death by hanging. McCord reported being told that the court asked the Americans if they could sentence her to hang as a sign of solidarity with the US Government's war on drugs. McCord was told that the court was advised that the Americans would accept no harsher sentence for their citizen than what had historically been handed down to one of their own women for a similar case. Days before McCord's sentencing hearing, she told Christian Reader, a renowned drug dealer in Dhaka was sentenced mid-trial to life imprisonment. She was later released for mistrial, but the precedent had been set; McCord was sentenced to 30 years — the Bangladeshi equivalent of a life sentence.

== Imprisonment and pardon ==
Though devastated that her "youth was over," (as she relates in the Locked Up Abroad – Bangladesh docudrama) McCord tried to make the most of being in prison. She learned to speak Bengali and taught other prisoners of her Christianity, as they taught her of their Hindu and Muslim faiths.

In 1996, after four years and six months in prison, McCord was pardoned at the request of Congressman Bill Richardson. Due to significant efforts by US Embassy consulate officers, the pardon was processed in record time and she returned home in Richardson's custody on July 30, 1996. After a day in Washington D.C., McCord returned to Houston with her mother on August 1, 1996. McCord earned an associate degree (June 1999) and bachelor's degree (June 2001) within five years of returning to the US. She also worked full-time at NASA's Johnson Space Center in Houston and, more recently, at the AES Corporation. She now lives and works on the East Coast. During the interview on the National Geographic episode, McCord said she learned a lot and would never do it again, but would not change the past.

In an interview at the airport in Dhaka, McCord spoke in Bengali and expressed affection for the people of Bangladesh, as well as a desire to return one day and show the gracious government what she has done with the second chance they gave her.

== Banged Up Abroad ==
McCord's story was featured in series three of the British TV series Banged Up Abroad. JC Gonzalez portrayed Lia McCord's brother, who drove to pick her up at Bush Airport while she was being arrested in Bangladesh.

== See also ==
- Bali Nine
- Schapelle Corby
