= Los Americans =

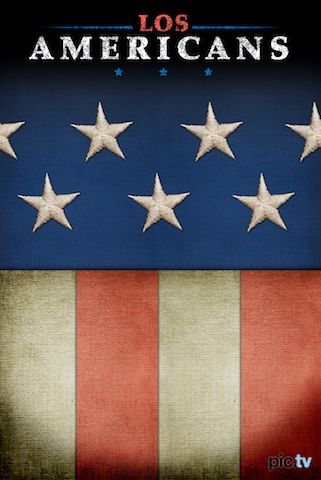
- Written by: Dennis Leoni
- Directed by: Dennis Leoni
- Starring: Esai Morales, Lupe Ontiveros, JC Gonzalez

Production
- Executive producer: Rey Ramsey
- Producers: Robert Townsend, Lydia Nicole
- Production locations: Santa Monica, California
- Cinematography: John L. Demps Jr.
- Editor: Robert Pergament
- Production company: V Studio

Original release
- Network: Pic.TV
- Release: May 26, 2011

Los Americans is an eight-part series that focuses on a multi-generational, middle-income Latino family living in Los Angeles. The show was written and directed by Dennis Leoni and released in 2011.

== Plot ==
The Valenzuela family live together in a multi-generational household in Los Angeles. The series centers on the tensions between Lee and his mother Lucia as they navigate issues including alcoholism, teenage rebellion, and immigration. The series follows the Valenzuela family, headed by Leandro Valenzuela, who goes by "Lee," a fully assimilated Mexican-American living in Los Angeles who has largely abandoned Spanish and his cultural heritage. The series explores the tensions this creates alongside broader social issues the family faces, including unemployment, homelessness, alcoholism, teenage pregnancy, and immigration. A central theme is Lee's estrangement from his cultural roots and native language, and the consequences of that distance for his sense of identity.

=== Episodes ===
Number	title	Description
1	"Happy Birthday"	Leandro (or "Lee" as he prefers to be called) Valenzuela's idyllic suburban world is shaken as he deals with losing his job, his mother's alcoholism and three new houseguests - his homeboy cousin Memo, who he hasn't seen in thirty years, Memo's undocumented wife and their overweight son. Written and directed by Dennis E. Leoni.
2	"Fish and House Guests"	The Valenzuelas try to adjust to a houseful of strange relatives living in their home, Lucia's growing problem with alcohol and Lee's struggle with prospect of his future unemployment and loss of income. Pilar, Memo's undocumented wife, surprises Lee with her generosity.
3	"The Legacy"	Memo gets a job before Lee does, prompting a celebration that goes awry. with the parents out, Lucia has too much to drink, passes out, and seventeen-year-old Jennifer invites some male friends over for a party, which leads to her drinking too much and also passing out, leaving her vulnerable...to whatever the boys want to do.
4	"Family Heirloom"	Lee, Alma, Memo and Pilar return to find an unconscious Jennifer in the hands of the boys she invited over. Lee and Alma are angry with Jennifer for inviting boys over and then drinking until she passed out, but they're furious with Lucia for getting drunk, passing out and leaving the children unprotected. Hard lessons are learned about the problems alcoholism has always created for the Valenzuela family.
5	"Lead Us Not Unto Temptation"	When Lee helps beautiful new neighbor Victoria get her car started, a gift of chocolate chip cookies sets off a chain of guilt, deception, lies, jealously and hypocrisy. all of it seems fairly trivial when Lee and Alma discover that Paul's fifteen-year-old friend Ariel is pregnant. But none of it compares with what they feel when Paul hits them with a revelation of his own.
6	"Secrets"	In an attempt to protect Ariel from her abusive mother, the Valenzuelas take in another house guest. but that doesn't stop Ariel's mother from challenging Alma, which escalates into a physical confrontation in full view of the neighbors. Lee meets Victoria's husband Jack, who has a problem with Lee helping his wife, the number of people who are living in the Valenzuela home and the disturbances all those people seem to be creating in their peaceful neighborhood.
7	"The Truth Hurts"	In an attempt to protect Ariel from her abusive mother, the Valenzuelas take in another house guest. but that doesn't stop Ariel's mother from challenging Alma, which escalates into a physical confrontation in full view of the neighbors. Lee meets Victoria's husband Jack, who has a problem with Lee helping his wife, the number of people who are living in the Valenzuela home and the disturbances all those people seem to be creating in their peaceful neighborhood.
8	"Going to Mexico"	While everyone worries about the challenges Ariel's pregnancy presents for the family, Lee has finally lined up his perfect dream job. Things go from bad to horrible when Pilar is taken away by Immigration and Customs Enforcement, apparently turned in by Victoria's husband Jack. Pouring salt into the wound, Lee's dream job interview becomes a nightmare.

== Cast ==
- Esai Manuel Morales, Jr. (born October 1, 1962) is an American actor. He played Bob Valenzuela in the 1987 biopic La Bamba. He also appeared in the PBS drama American Family and in the Showtime series Resurrection Blvd. He is best known for his roles as Lt. Tony Rodriguez on NYPD Blue, Joseph Adama in the science fiction television series Caprica, and Camino del Rio in the Netflix original series Ozark. He played Lee Valenzuela in Los Americans
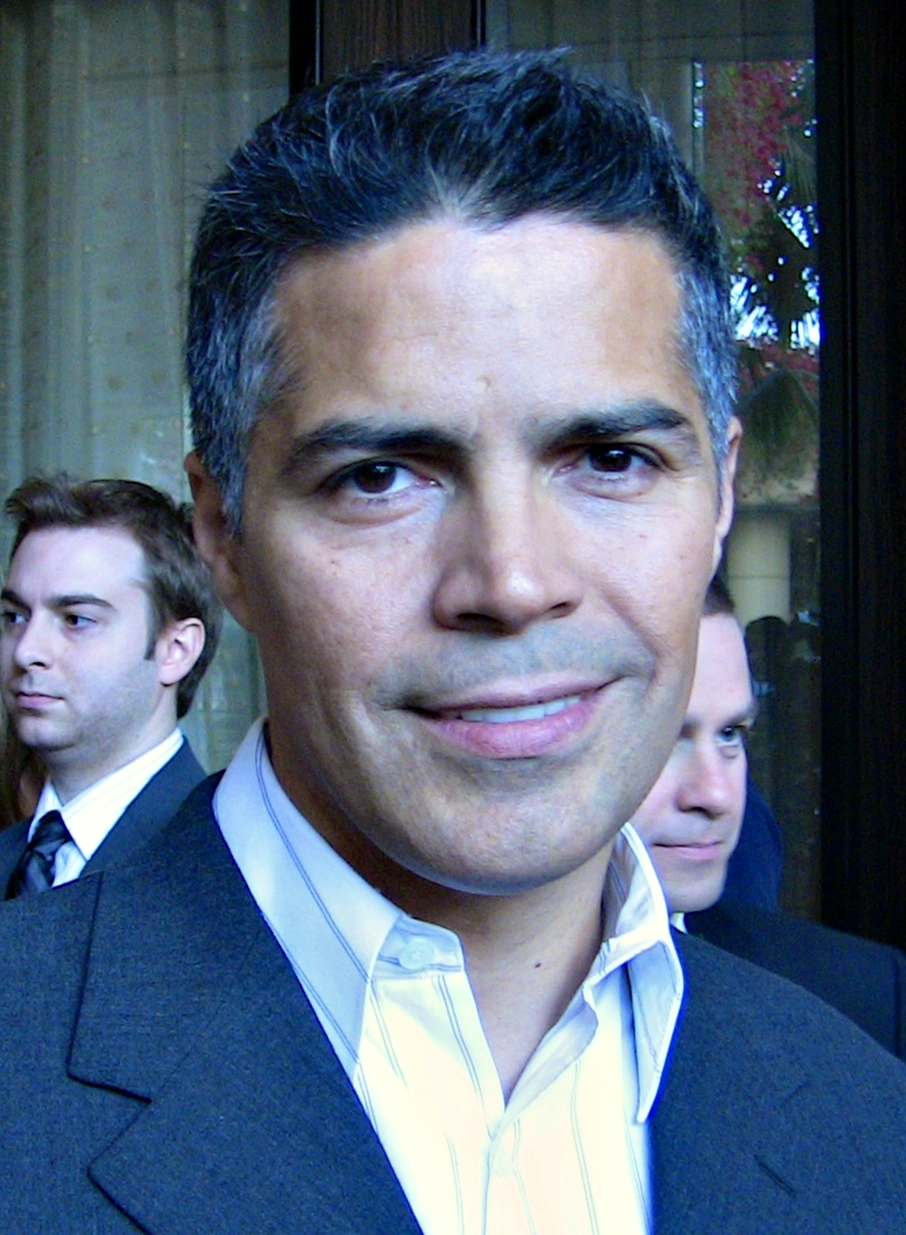
  - The Truth Hurts (2011) ... Lee Valenzuela - Happy Birthday (2011) ... Lee - Going to Mexico (2011) ... Lee Valenzuela - The Legacy ... Lee - Secrets ... Lee Valenzuela - Lead Us Not Unto Temptation ... Lee Valenzuela - Fish and House Guests ... Lee Valenzuela - Family Heirloom ... Lee
- Lupe Ontiveros was an American actress best known for portraying Yolanda Saldívar in the film Selena. She acted in numerous films and television shows, often playing a maid or, near the end of her career, an all-knowing grandmother. She was nominated for an Emmy Award for her work on Desperate Housewives and received critical acclaim for her role in Chuck & Buck, for which she won the National Board of Review award for Best Supporting Actress, and was also nominated for an Independent Spirit Award. as Lucia Valenzuela : - The Truth Hurts (2011) ... Lucia Valenzuela
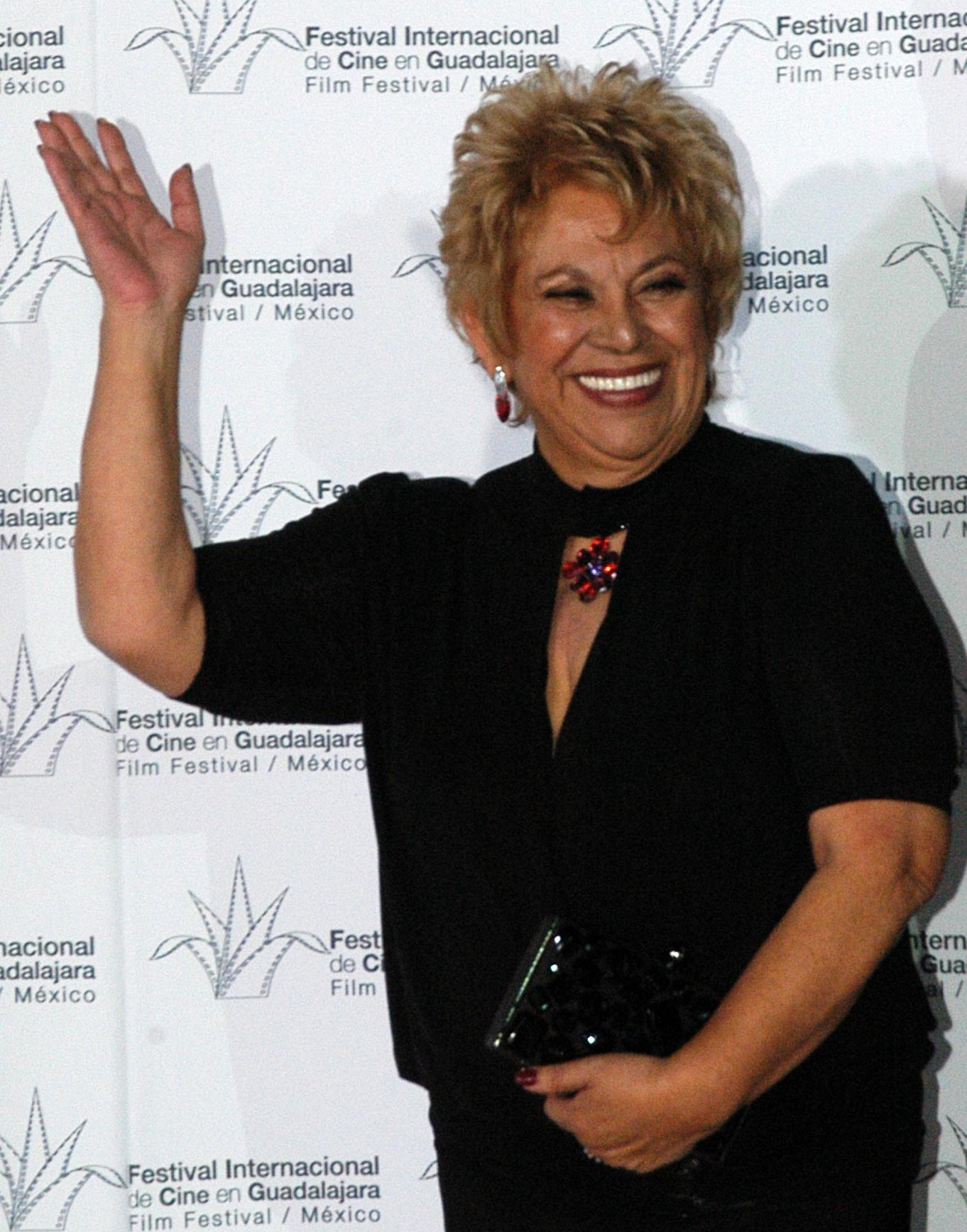
  Lupe Ontiveros
  - Happy Birthday (2011) ... Lucia - Going to Mexico (2011) ... Lucia Valenzuela - The Legacy ... Lucia - Secrets ... Lucia Valenzuela - Lead Us Not Unto Temptation ... Lucia Valenzuela - Fish and House Guests ... Lucia Valenzuela - Family Heirloom ... Lucia
- JC Gonzalez, Juan Camilo Gonzalez, known professionally as JC Gonzalez, is a Colombian actor and singer-songwriter. His career began in 2009, when he participated in television commercials and advertisements in Texas. Gonzalez was also a candidate on Making Menudo, an MTV reality show for which they selected twenty-five bilingual male singers. Gonzalez has also made appearances in film and television, such as Parks and Recreation, Blue (web series) and Los Americans as Paul Valenzuela : - The Truth Hurts (2011) ... Paul Valenzuela
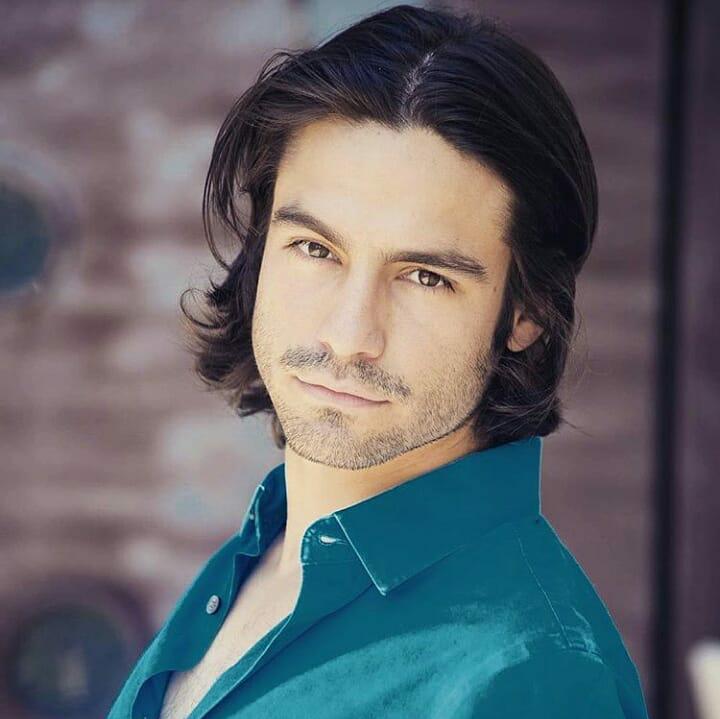
  JC Gonzalez
  - Happy Birthday (2011) ... Paul - Going to Mexico (2011) ... Paul Valenzuela - The Legacy ... Paul - Secrets ... Paul Valenzuela - Lead Us Not Unto Temptation ... Paul Valenzuela - Fish and House Guests ... Paul Valenzuela - Family Heirloom ... Paul
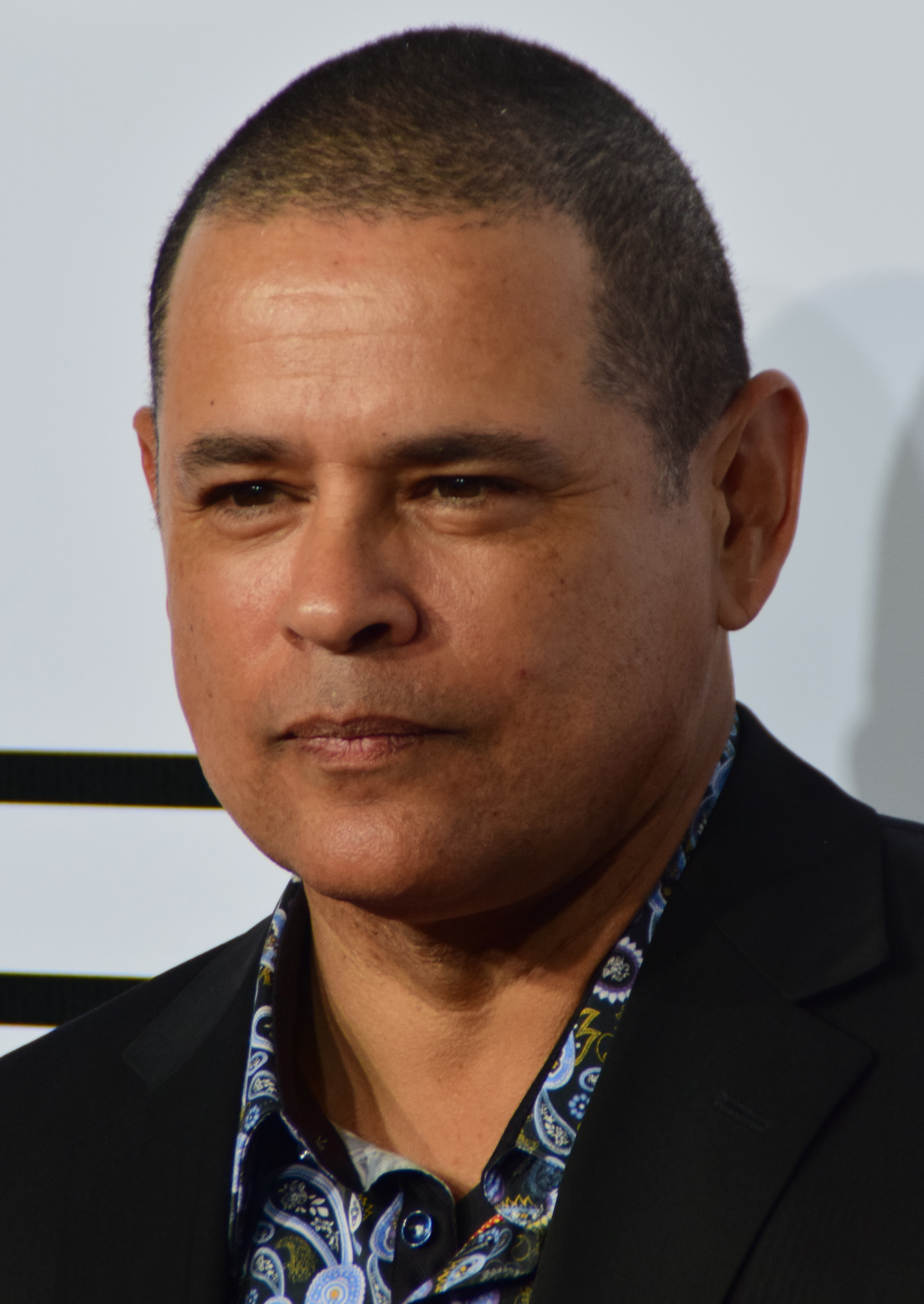
- Raymond Cruz
  Raymond Cruz is an American actor, best known for his starring role as Detective Julio Sanchez in the series The Closer and his recurring role as the drug lord Tuco Salamanca in the crime drama Breaking Bad and its spin-off Better Call Saul. He also starred on the series Major Crimes, a spinoff of The Closer, reprising the role of Sanchez Beside his role in Los Americans as Memo: - The Truth Hurts (2011) ... Memo - Happy Birthday (2011) ... Memo - Going to Mexico (2011) ... Memo - The Legacy ... Memo - Lead Us Not Unto Temptation ... Memo - Fish and House Guests ... Memo - Family Heirloom ... Memo
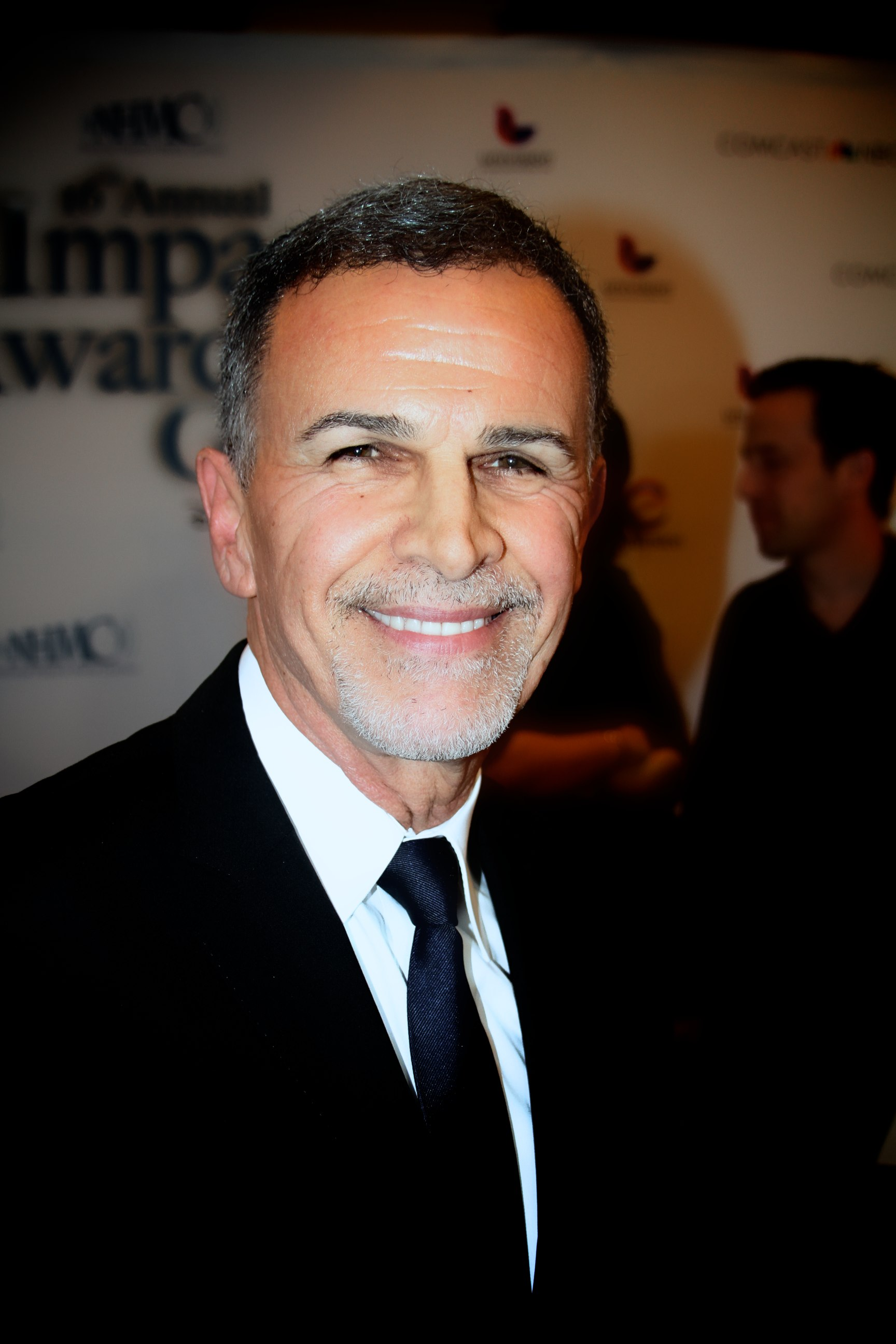
- Tony Plana
  Tony Plana (born April 19, 1952), better known as Tony Plana, is a Cuban American actor and director. He is known for playing Betty Suarez's father, Ignacio Suarez, on the ABC television show Ugly Betty and also for voicing Manuel "Manny" Calavera in the video game Grim Fandango. and in Los Americans as Max : - Happy Birthday (2011) ... Max - The Legacy ... Max - Lead Us Not Unto Temptation ... Max
- Yvonne DeLaRosa is an American actress, best known for her role on the Imagen award-winning series Los Americans, Yvonne has appeared in films such as Helter Skelter, Mystery Woman: Snapshot, and The Sorrow, in addition to landing roles on TV shows, including How I Met Your Mother, NCIS (TV series), Weeds, and The King of Queens. She has been heralded as 'The face of the new wave of Latino talent' by Jimmy Smits. She is also a serial entrepreneur of two successive cannabis dispensaries, and in Los Americans as Alma Valenzuela: - The Truth Hurts (2011) ... Alma Valenzuela
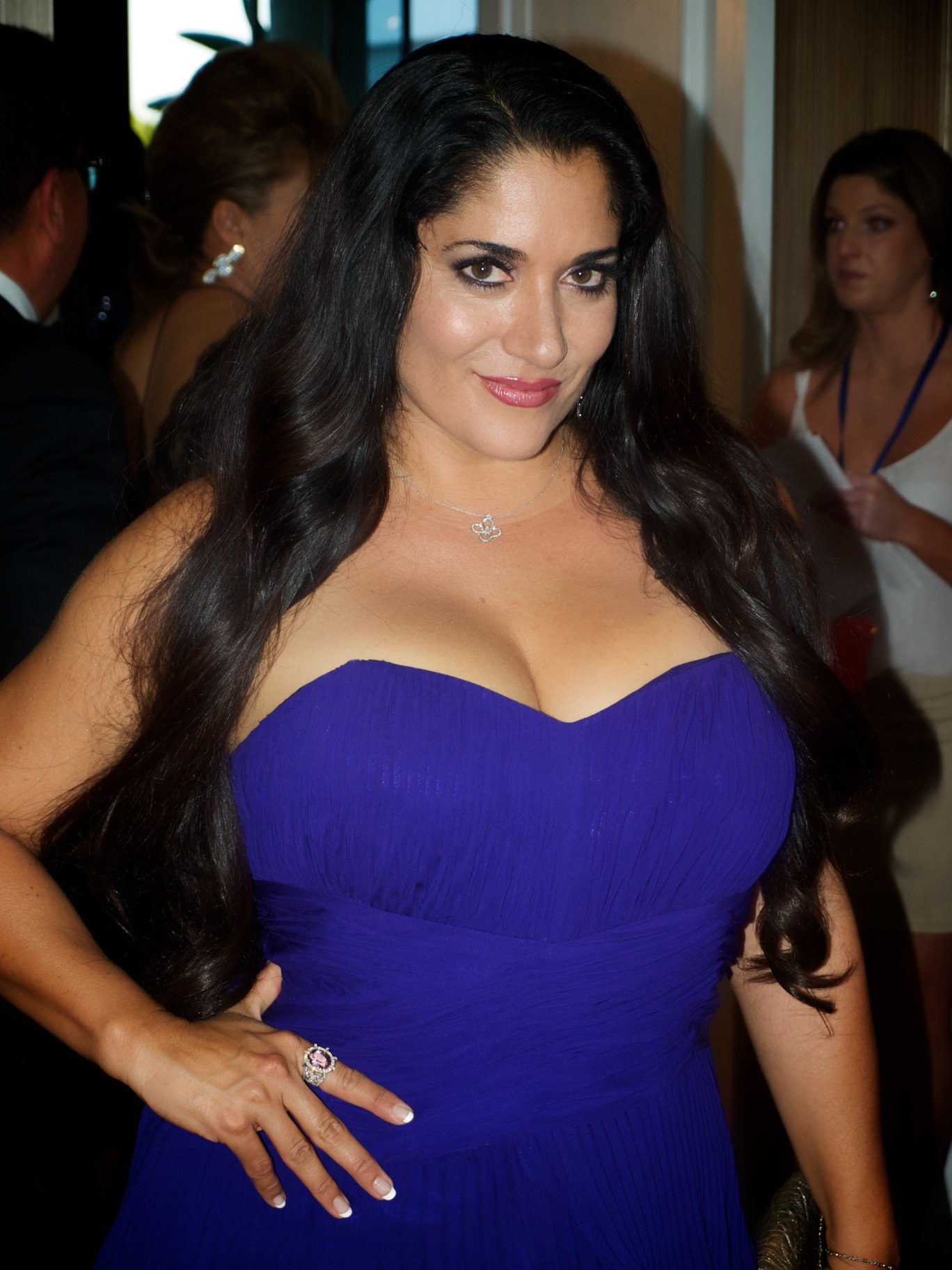
  Yvonne DeLaRosa
  - Happy Birthday (2011) ... Alma - Going to Mexico (2011) ... Alma Valenzuela - The Legacy ... Alma - Secrets ... Alma Valenzuela - Lead Us Not Unto Temptation ... Alma Valenzuela - Fish and House Guests ... Alma Valenzuela - Family Heirloom ... Alma
- Ana Villafañe is an American actress and singer from Miami, Florida, best known for her portrayal of pop icon Gloria Estefan in the Broadway musical On Your Feet!, also in Los Americans as Jennifer Valenzuela: - The Truth Hurts (2011) ... Jennifer Valenzuela- Happy Birthday (2011) ... Jennifer - Going to Mexico (2011) ... Jennifer Valenzuela - The Legacy ... Jennifer - Secrets ... Jennifer Valenzuela - Lead Us Not Unto Temptation ... Jennifer Valenzuela - Family Heirloom ... Jennifer
- Written and Directed by Dennis E.Leoni

== Awards and recognition ==
- The Imagen Foundation - Best Drama Web Series, 2012
- Indie Series Awards Nominated, ISA - Best supporting Actress - Drama, 2012 Lupe Ontiveros
- Indie Series Awards Nominated, ISA - Best supporting Actor - Drama, 2012 Raymond Cruz

Alan Greenlee, Vice President of Programs, One Economy stated "this series is an engaging drama that will help millions of riders take action to improve their lives and make informed decisions."
