= Dogwatch (film) =

1996 American action film

- Directed by: John Langley
- Starring: Sam Elliott; Esai Morales; Paul Sorvino
- Music by: Lennie Niehaus
- Release date: 1996
- Running time: 100 minutes
- Country: United States
- Language: English

Dogwatch is a 1996 American action crime thriller film directed by John Langley and starring Sam Elliott, Esai Morales and Paul Sorvino.

== Cast ==
- Sam Elliott as Charlie Falon
- Esai Morales as Murrow
- Paul Sorvino as Delgoti
- Dan Lauria as Halloway
- Richard Gilliland as Orlanser
- Mimi Graven as Sally
- Mike Burstyn as Levinson
- Mike Watson as Winch

== Reception ==
TV Guide gave the film a negative review: "...Sam Elliott works hard but can't make this straight-to-video feature anything more than a bargain-basement Bad Lieutenant (1992)."

Rose Thompson of Radio Times awarded the film two stars out of five.
