= Banged Up Abroad =

British television series

- Title Screen
- Also known as: See International airings below
- Created by: Bart Layton
- Country of origin: United Kingdom
- No. of series: 15
- No. of episodes: 133

Production
- Running time: 60 minutes (with commercials)
- Production company: Raw TV

Original release
- Network: Channel 5 (UK); National Geographic Channel
- Release: March 2006 – December 2022

Banged Up Abroad (rebadged as Locked Up Abroad in Asia and the United States, and Jailed Abroad in India, for the National Geographic Channel) is a British documentary/docudrama television series created by Bart Layton that was produced for Channel 5 and that premiered in March 2006. Most episodes feature stories of people who have been arrested while travelling abroad, usually for trying to smuggle illegal drugs, although some episodes feature people who were either kidnapped or captured while they were either travelling or living in other countries. Some episodes have featured real-life stories that first became well known when they were made the subject of a film: films that have been 're-made' in this way include Midnight Express, Goodfellas, The Devil's Double, Argo, Mr Nice and, to a lesser extent, Casino (with the story of Frank Cullotta). A few episodes have focused on undercover infiltrations of criminal syndicates by law enforcement agents or individuals recruited by them.

Since 2006, there have been a total of 13 regular series, plus a special series called Kidnapped Abroad. The fifteenth series began airing in October 2022.

== Episode format ==
The episodes typically contain a mixture of interviews with the real people and actors reconstructing the events. The convicted or captured are shown talking about their experiences, combined with dramatic reenactments of their respective experiences. The episodes focus on the events leading up to the arrest or time in captivity.

In a few of the cases, at the end of the episode, the convicted are shown sitting with hand-cuffs on if they are still in prison. In most cases, the convicted or captured have returned home. In some episodes, the convicted or captured are shown revisiting the region in which the incident occurred.

== Episodes ==
=== Series 1 (2006) ===
Episode 1: Costa Rica/Mexico (Scott and Lucy's Story)
Scott Campbell and Lucy Baker are British travellers arrested in Mexico for having drugs.

Episode 2: Thailand (The Sandra Gregory Story)
Sandra Gregory is arrested in Thailand trying to smuggle heroin into Japan.

Episode 3: Australia (Mark's Story)
Mark Knowles is arrested in Sydney after attempting to smuggle cocaine from the U.S. to Australia.

Episode 4: Venezuela (Denis and Donald's Story)
Donald McNeil, a yachtsman, is arrested after being pressured to collect an enormous shipment of cocaine worth £30 million from Margarita Island (more than $43.2 million USD). Later it was found that Edward Jarvis was the man named in the episode as "Frank"; he was later caught and arrested.

=== Series 2 (2007) ===
Episode 1: Venezuela (James and Paul's Story)
Jim Miles and Paul Loseby, two British teenagers, are arrested in Venezuela for trying to smuggle drugs. Directed by Bart Layton.

Episode 2: Peru (Krista and Jennifer's Story/Peruvian Prison Nightmare)
Krista Barnes and Jennifer Davis are two American women arrested for trying to smuggle cocaine out of Peru.

Episode 3: Nepal (Piers' Story)
Piers Hernu, a dual British-French traveller, is arrested trying to smuggle 28 kilos of gold bullion from Hong Kong to Nepal.

Episode 4: Colombia (Glen's story)
Glen Heggstad, an American adventurer, is kidnapped by the Colombian National Liberation Army.

=== Series 3 (2008) ===
Episode 1: Kuwait (Scott's Story)
Scott White is arrested in Kuwait for selling hashish, then escapes from jail during the 1990 invasion of Kuwait.

Episode 2: Peru
Russell Thoresen, an American traveller, is arrested in Peru for trying to smuggle cocaine.

Episode 3: Bangladesh
Lia McCord, an American teenager, is arrested in Bangladesh for trying to smuggle heroin.

Episode 4: Pakistan
Amardeep Bassey, a British journalist on the way to Afghanistan for an assignment, is accused of being a spy and arrested in Pakistan.

Episode 5: Peru
Sarah Jackson convinces her friend Simon Burke to go to Peru with her in order to serve as her unwitting drug-smuggling accomplice. Jackson was in the middle of serving a seven-year sentence when the episode was produced.

Episode 6: Taiwan
Taiwan's most-wanted criminal breaks into the house of McGill Alexander, a South African army colonel, and takes Alexander and his family hostage.

Episode 7: Ecuador
An American, Daniel Van De Zande is arrested trying to smuggle cocaine from Ecuador to Europe.

Episode 8: South Korea
Cullen Thomas, working with his girlfriend "Rocket", is arrested trying to smuggle hashish from the Philippines to South Korea.

=== Series 4 – Kidnapped (2009) ===
In 2008, five additional episodes were produced, each one about a kidnapping, under the alternate title "Kidnapped Abroad".

Episode 1: Uganda/Death in the Jungle
Safari guide Mark Ross and his tour group are kidnapped by Hutu rebels in Uganda.

Episode 2: Chechnya/Nightmare in Chechnya
Jon James and Camilla Carr, who run a children's center in Grozny, are kidnapped by Chechnyan soldiers, then raped and tortured.

Episode 3: India/Hostage to Terror
Rhys Partridge and Béla Nuss are kidnapped by British terrorist Ahmed Omar Saeed Sheikh while traveling in India.

Episode 4: Philippines: Fatal Mission/Kidnapped by Terrorists
Gracia and Martin Burnham, Christian missionaries in the Philippines, are kidnapped by members of Abu Sayyaf, a Muslim fundamentalist group.

Episode 5: Malaysia/Nightmare Vacation
While vacationing in Malaysia, Monique and Callie Strydom are kidnapped by a Muslim militant group and held hostage for four months in the Philippines.

=== Series 5 (2010) ===
Episode 1: Venezuela/Venezuela Blues
David Evans is arrested trying to smuggle drugs from Venezuela to Amsterdam.

Episode 2: Philippines/Terror Island/Kidnapped in the Philippines
Church volunteer Greg Williams is kidnapped and tortured by members of Abu Sayyaf.

Episode 3: Mexico/Mexican Justice
Jake Libbon gets arrested in Mexico for selling marijuana, then is falsely accused of shooting two police officers.

Episode 4: Brazil/Brazil's Worst Prison/Busted in Brazil
Hollywood "party animal" Brendan Cosso and three friends are arrested trying to smuggle cocaine out of Brazil.

Episode 5: Indonesia/Escape from Hell/Busted in Bali
Chris Parnell is arrested in Indonesia after being accused of smuggling hashish.

Episode 6: Mexico/Boy From The Ghetto/Busted in Mexico
American teenager Alex Silva is arrested trying to smuggle marijuana from Mexico into the U.S.

Episode 7: Cuba/What's in The Bag
In order to see her daughter, American Kahlilah Saleem is forced by her boyfriend to smuggle cocaine through Cuba.

Episode 8: Iraq/Kidnapped in Iraq
Journalists Scott Taylor and Zeynep Tugrul are kidnapped by insurgents who accuse them of being American spies.

Episode 9: Barbados/Busted and Pregnant
British teen Zara Whittaker is arrested at an airport trying to smuggle cocaine out of Barbados.

Episode 10: Ecuador/Master of Deception/Betrayed in Ecuador
Zoe McGarry, an Irish woman living in London, receives an 8-year prison sentence in Ecuador after the rucksack she was carrying is found to contain drugs. She claims she did not know the bag contained drugs and was duped by someone who asked her for help.

Episode 11: Sierra Leone/Jungle Siege
Major Phil Ashby, tasked with disarming rebel fighters in Sierra Leone, becomes trapped and attempts a daring escape.

Episode 12: Jamaica/Jamaican Getaway
T.K. White and her girlfriend are sent to Kingston's notorious central prison after attempting to smuggle marijuana.

Episode 13: India/Delhi/Party Girl
Clare Matthews, a British woman on extended vacation in Goa, ends up in an Indian prison after attempting to mail hashish from Delhi.

=== Series 6 (2011) ===
Episode 1: Turkey/The Real Midnight Express
The 1977 book Midnight Express, and the Oscar-winning 1978 film on which it was based, also called Midnight Express, told the story of 20-year-old college student Billy Hayes, his imprisonment for drug smuggling and his escape from the infamous Sagmalcilar Prison in Istanbul, Turkey. But for legal reasons, the book, which Hayes co-wrote, was not completely accurate and the film version strayed even further from the truth, reportedly for artistic reasons. In this episode, Hayes tells the full story of being sent to the brutal Turkish prison and his eventual escape.

Episode 2: Iraq/Human Shields in Iraq
When Saddam Hussein invaded Kuwait in 1990, Tom Lynch and his fellow contractor John White decided to get out of Iraq while they still could, but were captured by Iraqi soldiers and taken to a notorious prison in Baghdad, where they must listen to inmates being tortured to death.

Episode 3: Japan/Tokyo Takedown
After accepting an offer to work as a hostess in Japan, Jackie Nichols meets a charming Israeli drug smuggler and agrees to smuggle hashish with him. She gets away with it four times, but the fifth time, she's not so lucky.

Episode 4: Thailand/Bangkok Underworld
A 28-year-old English teacher named Tim Schrader agrees to smuggle eight kilos of heroin into the U.S. to solve his financial problems. Although he knows he could receive the death penalty, the money is too tempting to resist.

Episode 5: Spain/Sold My Soul
With his girlfriend pregnant, American musician Michael Morey needs money and agrees to smuggle cocaine from Quito to Spain. He barely makes it through Ecuadorian customs, but when he lands and goes through Spanish customs, he's not so lucky.

Episode 6: Panama/Colombia Ambush
Young American backpacker Mark Wedeven and his companions decide to cross from Panama to Colombia through the jungles of the Darién Gap, where they are kidnapped by a paramilitary group.

=== Series 7 (2012) ===
Episode 1: United States/The Real Goodfella
Henry Hill, the inspiration behind the classic film Goodfellas, relives his descent from Mafia wise guy to a term in Terminal Island Penitentiary.

Episode 2: Saudi Arabia/Saudi Bootlegger
Gordon Malloch's bootleg booze racket fuelled a party lifestyle in Saudi Arabia, until he gets caught and finds himself facing four years in prison.

Episode 3: Philippines/Prisoner of Love
Briton David Scott tells the story of finding his soulmate in the Philippines, and risking a 14-year prison sentence for adultery.

Episode 4: Mexico/Funny Money
After heading to Mexico with a suitcase of fake money to buy drugs, California bodybuilder Jeremy Khinoo finds himself behind bars and in big trouble.

Episode 5: Mauritius /Heroin Sting
After being caught with a kilo of heroin in Mauritius, Brigene Young faces 45 years in jail unless she can help catch the drug traffickers. Young eventually served 7 years in prison.

Episode 6: Spain/Daredevil Drug Runner
The tale of Chris Chance, whose daredevil life smuggling cannabis into the U.K. concealed in a rubber body suit leads to a nasty prison sentence at Carabanchel Prison.

Episode 7: Argentina/The Cocaine Trap
Stephen Sutton gets caught up when he is offered $15,000 to transport cocaine disguised as gold, leading to an 11-year prison sentence.

Episode 8: Peru/Drug Dealer Revenge
Company director Robert Pringle is sentenced to seven years in a violent South-American lock-up after being pressured by his dealer to smuggle drugs.

Episode 9: Colombia/Teenage Drug Smuggler
Vivian Carrasquillo faces a crash diet in jail after an attempt to raise funds for gastric bypass surgery by becoming a drug mule backfires.

Episode 10: Thailand/Backstabbed in Thailand
Military veteran Kim Hood faces life behind bars in a squalid Thai prison after being caught smuggling 14 kilos of heroin with a friend.

=== Series 8 (2013) ===
Episode 1: Peru/Cocaine Mule Mom
Ruthie Lambert, a middle-aged mother of three, decides to smuggle drugs to make ends meet. She is imprisoned for years but eventually escapes by bribing a corrupt official.

Episode 2: Argentina/Escape From Argentina
Lucy Wright, a crack-addicted nursing student, faces 25 years in prison when she's caught trying to smuggle cocaine into the U.K. from Argentina.

Episode 3: Saudi Arabia/Dangerous Liaison
British nurse Stephen Comiskey, who takes a job in Saudi Arabia to support his family, draws the unwelcome attention of the Saudi religious police after a series of illicit gay affairs.

Episode 4: Guyana/Guadeloupe/Caribbean Nightmare
David and Jayne Bladen's dream of a new life overseas turns into a nightmare journey of drug smuggling and violence culminating in 20 months behind bars.

Episode 5: Japan/The Juggler Smuggler
Traveling magician Mark Greening juggles a young family with a budding hash-smuggling business after moving to Japan, but he soon gets caught.

Episode 6: Pakistan/From Hollywood To Hell
When young actor Erik Audé discovers that he was tricked into smuggling opium out of Pakistan, he must fight to stay alive and clear his name.

Episode 7: Mexico/Black Palace of Horrors
After a horrific stay in Mexico's notorious Black Palace prison, would-be drug smuggler Dwight Worker vows to escape or die trying.

Episode 8: Colombia/Colombian Kidnap
When Reini Weigel, Erez Eltawil and six other backpackers are snatched by guerrillas in Colombia, they adopt different survival strategies, including cooperation versus outright resistance.

Episode 9: Brazil/Hasidic King of Coke
Orthodox Jew Samuel Leibowitz dreams of making millions as a drug kingpin in Brazil, leading to a terrifying term in the deadly Carandiru Penitentiary.

Episode 10: Nicaragua/I Am Not A Terrorist
Duane Wollum is about to make some easy money smuggling cocaine, until an airport security check reveals that he is concealing a package.

Episode 11: China/My Dad The Smuggler
Scott Campbell can not wait to take a trip to China with his estranged father. Little does he know that his father has something else planned.

Episode 12: Iraq/Son of Saddam
The incredible story of how Iraqi soldier Latif Yahia is forced to become a body double for Uday Hussein, Saddam Hussein's highly volatile eldest son.

Episode 13: Chile/Chilean Prison Break
The gripping story of Tom Hanway, who flees a Chilean prison with a fellow prisoner, taking a dangerous and fatal escape route across the desert.

Episode 14: Panama/The Orchid Hunters
The shocking story of Tom Hart Dyke and Paul Winder, two British backpackers who are ambushed and held for ransom by a guerilla group while crossing the notoriously dangerous Darien Gap.

Episode 15: Venezuela/Venezuela Hustle
Desperate to keep his family afloat, Paul Keany agrees to smuggle six kilos of cocaine from Venezuela back to Dublin, but it turns out to be the worst decision of his life.

Episode 16: Iraq/Highway to Hell
Adventure-seeker Thomas Hamill takes a job driving trucks in Iraq, leading to a terrifying time in captivity after being kidnapped by insurgents.

Episode 17: Egypt/Not Without My Baby
When Susan Haglof and her husband are duped by a disreputable adoption service in Egypt into acquiring a fake birth certificate for their new baby, she faces the possibility of being imprisoned and losing her precious child forever.

Episode 18: Somalia/Nightmare in Somalia
The terrifying story of photojournalist Nigel Brennan and reporter Amanda Lindhout, who are held hostage for 15 months by a criminal gang in Somalia.

Episode 19: Thailand/Busted in Bangkok
Thrown into a notorious Bangkok prison for attempting to smuggle heroin, Angela Carnegie has an epiphany while nursing a fellow inmate with a drug addiction.

Episode 20: Soviet Union/Escape from the Gulag
Caught trying to smuggle heroin, Jerry Amster finds himself facing a lengthy term in one of the USSR's toughest slave labor camps.

=== Series 9 (2014) ===
Episode 1: North Vietnam/POWs McCain & Brace
Ernie Brace is a civilian American pilot during the Vietnam War held as a prisoner of war for about eight years in North Vietnam, including at the infamous "Hanoi Hilton". He communicated with fellow POW John McCain by tapping through the wall and the two never spoke face-to-face until after the war ended. The episode features interviews with both Brace and McCain. This episode was blocked in Vietnam due to what the Vietnamese government called "inaccurate information" about the Viet Cong.

Episode 2: Belize/Snakes on a Plane
Tom Crutchfield is a reptile smuggler under investigation during Operation Chameleon. He gets close to being caught in the United States, so he flees to Belize, where he ends up in prison until being deported back to the United States.

Episode 3: Arizona/Raving Arizona
Shaun Attwood moves from England to Arizona to become a stockbroker. However, he gets caught up in drugs, and eventually starts dealing ecstasy. After some intimidation from a mafia boss, he goes back to being a stockbroker, but he gets a visit from the DEA and ends up serving more than six years in Joe Arpaio's prison.

Episode 4: Iraq/Buried Alive
Roy Hallums is an American contractor who was kidnapped in Iraq from 2004 to 2005.

Episode 5: Iran/The Real Argo
This episode is the true account of the "Canadian Caper" during the Iran hostage crisis, the story that inspired the movie Argo. American diplomats are rescued in Iran by the Canadian Embassy and the CIA after the 1979 Iranian Revolution.

Episode 6: Mexico/Mexican Prison Escape
Five Americans attempt to smuggle more than 2,000 pounds of marijuana to the United States. After they are caught and placed in a Mexican prison, they plot a daring escape, excavating a 20-meter tunnel under the prison walls.

Episode 7: Peru/Hippie Mafia
Eddie Padilla lives in Hawaii and supports himself with drug smuggling. However, during one of those trips, he gets caught in Peru and lands in a Peruvian prison called the House of the Devil.

Episode 8: Nevada/Vegas Mobster
Frank Cullotta is a mobster in Las Vegas who becomes well known for robberies. He is caught by the FBI thanks to an informant, becomes a witness against the mob and enters witness protection.

Episode 9: Washington/Fast, Furious and Busted
This episode takes place in the United States and tells the story of Rick Cedar from Spokane, Washington. Needing cash, he runs an online scam, but that con catches up with him. He moves further into crime to get what he needs.

Episode 10: United States/Hunting Mr. Nice
Howard Marks is a school teacher who enters into criminality when he helps a friend with a drug deal. Eventually, the easy money turns him into a multi-national drug smuggler. One of his loads is seized by authorities and he is now wanted and on the run. However, the DEA manages to catch up with him.

=== Series 10 (2015) ===
Episode 1: Mexico/Plane Crash Marijuana

In 1972, 19-year-old American Jim Paprocki, a college graduate, is convinced by his brother-in-law to join him on a drug run to Southern Mexico. All goes to plan until the cargo catches fire and they are forced to crash-land. Jim soon finds himself in Mazatlan State Prison, 'one of the oldest, meanest, dirtiest jails in Mexico'.

Episode 2: Thailand/Thai Prison Hell

In 1993, 25-year-old Australian Martin Garnett is already earning good money at a luxury car dealership in Sydney, but he's hungry for more. He is caught smuggling 4.7 kilos of heroin into Bangkok and is set to become Australia's longest serving prisoner overseas.

Episode 3: Colombia/Bogota Belly Bust

The story of 28-year-old Ontarian Tabitha Ritchie, whose life took a terrifying turn when she was caught smuggling drugs out of Colombia.

Episode 4: Somalia/Somali Pirate Hostage Hell

The shocking story of South African couple Debbie Calitz and Bruno Pelizzari, who were kidnapped by Somali pirates and held captive for 20 terrifying months.

Episode 5: Philippines/Jungle Terror

The traumatic story of Kevin Lunsmann, an American schoolboy and his mother, Gerfa, who were kidnapped by Abu Sayyaf, a jihadist group, in the Philippines and held for ransom in the jungle.

Episode 6: Libya/Gaddafi's American Prisoner

Captured by Gaddafi's men while fighting with rebels in Libya, Baltimore-born Matthew VanDyke spent nearly six months in solitary confinement.

=== Series 11 (2018) ===
Episode 1: Ecuador/Breaking Bad in Britain

The story of convicted drug dealer Pieter Tritton, whose organization used camping tents to smuggle rubberized cocaine from Ecuador to Europe.

Episode 2: Syria/Escape from Al Qaeda

Rookie photographer Matt Schrier travels to Syria, where he is captured by Al-Nusra Front, the Syrian Al-Qaeda. Matt was held hostage for seven months with journalist Theo Curtis before escaping.

Episode 3: Bolivia/Narco at Nineteen

Simone Blignaut travels to Bolivia in 2013, where she is double-crossed and forced to smuggle liquid cocaine.

Episode 4: Sudan/Double Crossed in the Desert

When Journalist Phil Cox returns to Sudan in 2016 to investigate allegations of illegally deployed chemical weapons, he is kidnapped by a government-backed militia.

Episode 5: Mexico/Mexican Border Bust

Southern California resident Steven Peterson is arrested and imprisoned in Tijuana after attempting to smuggle 120 kilos of marijuana from Mexico to the United States.

Episode 6: Colombia/Bad Bromance

U.S. Naval Officer Lemar Burton is caught attempting to smuggle five kilos of cocaine from Colombia to Italy.

=== Series 12 (2019) ===
Episode 1: Thailand/Thai Meth Bust

The story of a British postman who uses his retirement pension to open a bar in Thailand, but quickly starts dealing meth. The police get wise and in a dramatic takedown bust him and send him to prison.

Episode 2: Greece/Greek Border Bust

An attempt to smuggle hash from Afghanistan to Germany ends up with imprisonment in Greece and imprisoned on an island.

Episode 3: Dominican Republic/Caribbean Coke King

The story of Michael Singh who tries cocaine smuggling to make money. But after 7 successful runs is caught and left to rot in a Dominican prison.

Episode 4: Mexico/Mexican Cartel Hell

Carlos Quijas is falsely imprisoned and tortured for drug smuggling.

Episode 5: Argentina/Narco Wine Bust

Champion skier Nick Brewer gets involved in a multi-million dollar cocaine empire in Argentina.

Episode 6: Thailand/Bangkok Betrayal

Dancer LaTasha Manson's opportunity of a lifetime turns to nightmare when she finds herself locked up and pregnant in a Thai jail.

Episode 7: Colombia/Jungle Crash

The story of Keith Stansell on a mission to find drug labs in the Colombian jungle who crashes his airplane and taken hostage.

Episode 8: Panama/Panamania

A Calgarian, Christina Jocko is locked up in a Central American jail after being found with 3.6 kilos of cocaine worth an estimated $400,000 in her suitcases.

Episode 9: India/Indian Hash Bust

Australian hippie Mark O'Brien joins an ashram in India and ends up smuggling hash.

Episode 10: Peru/Peruvian Parent Trap

Jail, attempted murder and a terrible family betrayal lay ahead of two ambitious cousins from Texas when they agree to run a car wash in Lima.

=== Series 13 (2020) ===
Episode 1: California/Undercover Biker

After his arrest, drug dealer Charles Falco strikes a deal and becomes an undercover confidential informant. For the first time, Charles tells his story of how he infiltrated the Vagos, one of the most violent biker gangs in the US.

Episode 2: South Korea/Thailand/Korean Ecstasy King

In South Korea, English teacher Jesse Moskel becomes the kingpin of a huge MDMA smuggling operation – and one of Southeast Asia's most wanted men.

Episode 3: Dominican Republic/Pop Star Smuggler

Jimmy Bauer is on the cusp of breaking into the music industry and only one thing stands in his way. Money. He faces moral temptation and life-changing decisions, all as he works out what's more important to him. The fame? Or the music?

Episode 4: India/Undercover Arms Dealer

When legitimate arms dealer Peter Bleach is asked to supply weapons for a suspected Indian terrorist cell, he agrees to go undercover for British Intelligence to capture the ringleader.

Episode 5: France/Model Drug Runner

Garrain Jones moves to L.A and launches a modeling career. Soon he has it all – the money, the lifestyle, the status but he loses everything when he is drawn into a shadowy drug-smuggling operation from which he cannot escape.

Episode 6: Ecuador/Drug Runner Mom

Single mom Melanie Di Egidio is set up by her Colombian contact during her drug run to Ecuador. Caught by the police, she turns informer but is imprisoned anyway. In prison, she falls in love, marries a fellow inmate and gets pregnant.

Episode 7: British Columbia/Washington/King of Weed

Canadian hockey pro Ryan Phillips is destined to become a star but as he climbs the ranks, he starts running a more profitable business alongside his hockey career – smuggling hundreds of pounds of marijuana from British Columbia into the US.

Episode 8: Colombia/Colombian Double Cross

Single mom Heather Ebling's dream vacation to Colombia doesn't live up to expectations. Then disappointment turns to terror when on her way home she's arrested for drug trafficking.

Episode 9: Peru/Peruvian Prison Break

Tina Myers is an exotic dancer and part time drug dealer. After she decides to make money on a Peruvian drug run, she embarks on a dangerous ride to the dark side of Peru's underworld, culminating in an insane prison escape.

Episode 10: Panama/Miami Mobster Take Down

When Miami mobster Tony Galeota opens a club in Panama City, the competition frames him for drug dealing and human trafficking. Locked up in one of the world's worst prisons, Tony has to prove his innocence and attempt an audacious escape.

=== Series 14 (2021) ===
Episode 1: Mexico/Declassified: Mexican Cartel Takedown

An ambitious DEA agent goes after a notorious Mexican cartel leader but gets sucked into a dark and treacherous world where the lines between good and evil are blurred. He'll stop at nothing to get his man, but when tragedy strikes, vengeance takes hold, and he makes a fatal mistake that tears his world apart.

Episode 2: Australia/Meth's Top Model

When swimwear model Simone Starr hits it big time, she moves to Hollywood to cash in. But life in the fast lane soon takes its toll on her finances and she decides the only way to keep the dream alive is to use her beauty brand as a ruse to ship drugs. By day she's pulling poses on the beach, and by night she's packing meth into gift sets, until one journey brings her whole world crashing down.

Episode 3: New York/Brazil/Mafia Terminator

In this real life Goodfellas tale, New York teen John Alite (portrayed by Dean Goldblum) gets a job at his local deli, a hangout for 'wise guys'. He soon finds himself wanting to be a mobster, and starts running errands for them. Rising swiftly through the ranks, John buries his conscience to become a notorious Mafia hitman for John Gotti. But when the house of cards tumbles, John must choose between his family and his oath to the Mob.

Episode 4: Maryland/Declassified: Undercover Crack Dealer

In this real-life version of Baltimore drama The Wire, local drug dealer Davon Mayer has a knack for making money. But when he gets arrested by two cops, to his surprise, they don't want him in jail, they want him to sell drugs for their profit. Davon soon finds himself enslaved by the corrupt cops' greed. The only way out is to risk his life and go undercover for the FBI to take them down.

Episode 5: Thailand/Thai Ice Storm

A broke young Londoner gets an exciting offer to work in his dad's bar in Thailand. But when he arrives, he soon discovers a world of temptation that he can not resist, breaking his father's golden rule and driving them apart. But when life goes from bad to worse for the youngster and he lands himself in the world's most notorious prison their relationship is tested to its limits.

Episode 6: Nova Scotia/Declassified: A Rat's Tale

When a lifelong gun runner and drug dealer infiltrates the Hells Angels biker gang for a million-dollar payout, he gets swept up in a horrific murder hit. Faced with a lifetime behind bars for his involvement, he has no choice but to go undercover for the RCMP, wearing a wire to collect confessions from his fellow conspirators. After 19 years in Witness Protection, with a bounty still on his head, career criminal Paul Derry tells his story for the first time on camera.

Episode 7: Venezuela/The Mother's Load

A young mom addicted to crack takes her child on a risky smuggling job.

Episode 8: United States/Declassified: Mole in the Mob

A Japanese-American Orange County kid gets his dream to become a gangster before a Las Vegas mob hit changes everything and he agrees to work for the FBI. Now Gangster turned informant he works his way up the world of organised crime infiltrating the heights of mafia royalty in New York, before a planned hit threatens to destroy his entire world.

Episode 9: Bolivia/50 Ton Pot Run

A 70s hippie and his naive pal are small time dealers selling hash to Boston college kids, until they get approached by a Colombian cartel keen to use their skills. Seduced by the danger and the dollars, they soon become multimillionaire importers, shipping tens of tons of marijuana on freighters up the West Coast, until one of the biggest busts in US history forces them on the run to Bolivia.

Episode 10: Peru/A Bellyful of Coke

A troubled young father goes on the run to Spain to avoid a small prison sentence. He starts working for a crime gang in the Costa Del Sol and is enamored by the gangster lifestyle. He feels untouchable and agrees to smuggle and swallow a kilo of cocaine back from Peru, only to face the biggest adrenalin kick of his life and seal his fate forever.

Episode 11: "Captive in South America"

Two groups of backpackers are kidnapped for ransom in South America.

=== Series 15 (2022) ===
Episode 1: Brazil/Love Behind Bars

After smuggling drugs for 18 months, Anelda Mare decides to quit, only to be told her parents will be killed unless she makes one last run.

Episode 2: United States/Declassified: Double Cross Dope Deal

Lured into drug running by his best friend, Chris is betrayed by the one person he thought he could trust.

Episode 3: Mexico/Narco Neverland

A young Chicago gangster escapes from a life of poverty when he starts smuggling drugs for a Mexican cartel, but then it all goes wrong.

Episode 4: Peru/Trauma Express

Travel-loving Bronwyn Atherton finds herself on the road to destruction when she's lured into the shady world of international drug-smuggling.

Episode 5: United States/Declassified: A King's Ransom

Rafael Arguelles was a gangster by the age of 17, but faced the consequences after going undercover for the FBI against his former friends.

Episode 6: Japan/Big Trouble in Tokyo

Steven Beattie's Thai party lifestyle isn't cheap, so he smuggles hash to fund it, for which he pays the ultimate price when he's locked up in Japan.

Episode 7: East Africa/Sole Smuggler

David Harte was in his forties when life collapsed around him. He was tempted into the shady world of drug smuggling, then got caught in Mauritius.

Episode 8: Thailand/Fighting Yaba

Liverpudlian Billy Moore moves to Thailand to start a new, happier life, but instead he gets addicted to the drug Yaba and loses control.

Episode 9: India/Casualty of War

Veteran soldier Brett heads to India to overcome his PTSD, but instead is tempted into smuggling weed out of the Himalayas and into Europe.

Episode 10: Australia/Dame of Cocaine

Struggling addict Andrea starts importing cocaine into Australia. After getting caught, she is forced to overcome her demons in a tough jail.

== International airings ==
Country	Foreign title	Network(s)	Notes
United Kingdom	"Banged up Abroad"	Channel 5 & National Geographic Channel	Country of origin
North Macedonia	"Затворени во странство" (lit. 'Banged up abroad')	National Geographic Channel	
Albania	"Të arrestuar jashtë shtetit" (lit. 'Banged up abroad')	National Geographic Channel	
Croatia	"Zatočeni u inozemstvu" (lit. 'Banged up abroad')	National Geographic Channel, HRT2	
France	"Voyage au bout de l'enfer" (lit. 'Journey to the depths of hell')	National Geographic Channel, Voyage	
Norway	"Fengslet i Utlandet" (lit. 'Imprisoned abroad')	National Geographic Channel	
Sweden	"Farlig Resa" (lit. 'Dangerous Journey')	Sveriges Television & National Geographic Channel	
Denmark	"Fra Paradis til Helvede" (lit. 'From Paradise to Hell') "Fanget i Udlandet" (lit. 'Caught Abroad')	TV2; National Geographic Channel	
Finland	"Vankilassa ulkomailla" (lit. 'In Prison Overseas')	Fox (Finland) & National Geographic Channel	
Czech Republic	"Vězněm v cizině" (lit. 'Prisoner Abroad')	Czech Television & TV Fanda & National Geographic Channel	
United States	"Locked up Abroad"	National Geographic Channel	
India	"Banged up Abroad"	National Geographic Channel	It is aired as "Jailed Abroad" on National Geographic Adventure.
New Zealand	"Banged up Abroad"	TV1	
Ireland	"Banged up Abroad"	TV3 & National Geographic Channel	
Australia	"Banged up Abroad", "Trouble in Paradise" (7mate)	National Geographic Channel, 7mate, & 9Gem	
Colombia	"Banged up Abroad", "Preso en el Extranjero"	National Geographic Channel	
Canada	"Banged up Abroad" and "Locked up Abroad"; French version: "Voyage d'enfer" (lit. 'abroad')	National Geographic Channel (English) and Canal D (French)	Aired originally as "Banged up Abroad" and as "Locked up Abroad" starting Dec 2011
Poland	"Podróż do piekła" (lit. 'Journey to Hell') "Koszmarna wyprawa" (lit. 'Nightmare Travel')	Discovery Channel; National Geographic Channel	
Netherlands	"Gevangen in het Buitenland" and "Locked up Abroad"	SBS6 and National Geographic Channel	
Italy	"Prigionieri di viaggio" and "Prigionieri di viaggio: ostaggi"	National Geographic Channel	
Belgium	"Locked up Abroad" and "Banged up Abroad"	National Geographic Channel	Aired as "Locked up Abroad" until 2009 and as Banged up Abroad in 2010
Romania	"Pierdut printre străini" (lit. 'Lost Among Foreigners')	National Geographic Channel	
Estonia	"Vangistatud Välismaal" (lit. 'Imprisoned Abroad')	National Geographic Channel	
Singapore	"Locked up Abroad" and "Banged up Abroad"	National Geographic Channel & National Geographic Adventure & Mediacorp Okto	It is aired as "Locked up Abroad" on National Geographic Channel and "Banged up Abroad" on National Geographic Adventure and Mediacorp Okto.
Spain	"Encarcelados en el extranjero" (lit. 'Imprisoned Abroad')	National Geographic Channel	
South Africa	"Banged up Abroad"	National Geographic Channel	
Panama	"Preso en el Extranjero" (lit. 'Imprisoned Abroad')	National Geographic Channel	
Mexico	"Preso en el Extranjero" (lit. 'Imprisoned Abroad')	National Geographic Channel	
Venezuela	"Preso en el Extranjero" (lit. 'Imprisoned Abroad')	National Geographic Channel	
Argentina	"Preso en el extranjero" (lit. 'Imprisoned Abroad')	National Geographic Channel	
Dominican Republic	"Preso en el extranjero" (lit. 'Imprisoned Abroad')	National Geographic Channel	
Thailand	"Locked up Abroad"	National Geographic Channel (TrueVisions 49)	
Germany	"Horror Trips – Wenn Reisen zum Albtraum werden" (lit. 'Horror Trips – when traveling becomes a nightmare')	National Geographic Channel	
Brazil	"Férias na Prisão" (lit. 'Vacation in Prison')	National Geographic Channel	
Hungary	"Bekasztlizva Külföldön" (lit. 'Locked Up Abroad')	National Geographic Channel	
Philippines	"Locked Up Abroad"	National Geographic Channel	
Malaysia	"Locked Up Abroad"	National Geographic Channel	
Indonesia	"Locked Up Abroad"	National Geographic Channel	
Israel	"כלואים בארץ זרה" (lit. 'Locked Up in a Foreign Land')	National Geographic Channel	It is aired as "Banged up abroad" on National Geographic Channel
Bulgaria	"Арестувани зад граница" (lit. 'Arrested Beyond Border')	National Geographic Channel	
Taiwan	"異鄉歷劫" (lit. 'Foreign Land Saga')	National Geographic Channel	
Turkey	"Kabusa Dönen Yolculuklar" (lit. 'Travels Turned Into a Nightmare')	National Geographic Adventure	
Serbia	"Ćorkirani u inostranstvu" (lit. 'Banged Up Abroad')	National Geographic Channel	
Portugal	"Presos no Estrangeiro" (lit. 'Arrested Abroad')	National Geographic Channel	
United Arab Emirates	"مسجون في الغربة" (lit. 'Imprisoned Abroad')	National Geographic Abu Dhabi	
Greece	"Εφιάλτης πέρα από τα σύνορα" (lit. 'Nightmare Beyond Borders'), "Φυλακισμένοι στο Εξωτερικό" (lit. 'Imprisoned Abroad')	Skai TV, National Geographic Channel, Discovery Channel	
Russia	"Злоключения за границей" (lit. 'Locked Up Abroad')	National Geographic Channel	
Vietnam	"Bị Quản Thúc Ở Nước Ngoài" (lit. 'Locked Up Abroad')	National Geographic Channel	
Lithuania	"Locked Up Abroad"	National Geographic Channel	
Mongolia	"Харийн шоронд" (lit. 'Locked Up Abroad')	National Geographic Channel	

== See also ==
- List of American people imprisoned abroad
- List of Australians imprisoned or executed abroad
- Extradition
