= Ana Villafañe =

American actress

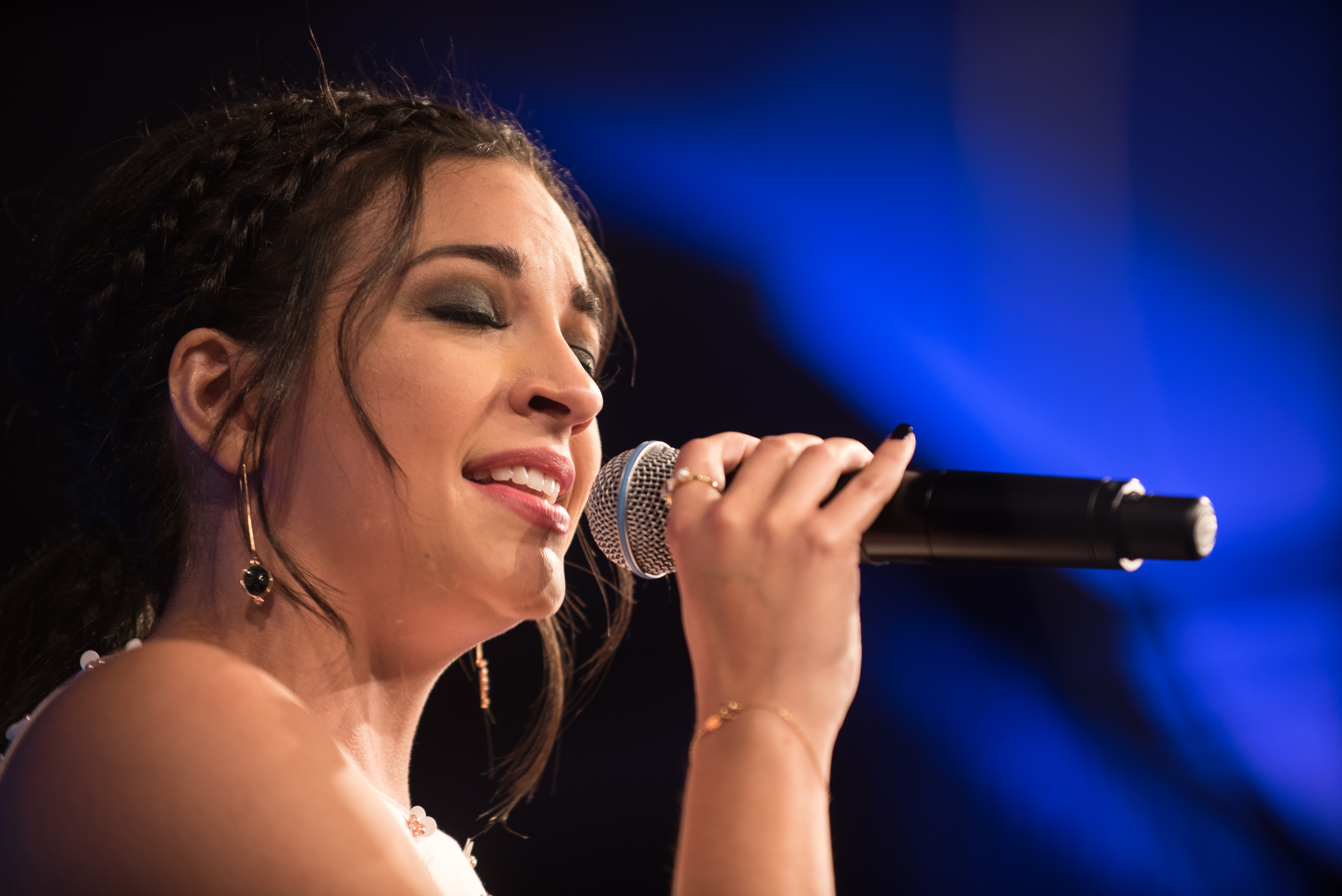
- Occupations: Actress, singer

Ana Villafañe (/ˌviːjəˈfɑːnjeɪ/ VEE-yə-FAHN-yay) is an American actress and singer, best known for her portrayal of pop icon Gloria Estefan in the Broadway musical On Your Feet!.

== Life and career ==
Villafañe's film and television credits include: the award-winning Magic City Memoirs (executive producer Andy Garcia) "Los Americans" created by Dennis Leoni (Resurrection Boulevard) Hiding (Anchor Bay) the Hulu Original Series South Beach set in Miami, and the female lead in the superhero feature film Max Steel (Mattel).

In the fall of 2014, Gloria Estefan and Emilio Estefan—alongside the producers and creative team of their biographical musical On Your Feet!—launched an international casting search, dubbed "Reach Gloria" (#ReachGloria) which offered performers around the world a chance to audition for the cast of the musical. Thousands of Broadway hopefuls—from Los Angeles, to Australia, to Colombia, to Singapore—auditioned for roles by submitting videos online, or attending one of two open casting calls held in New York City and the Estefans’ home-city of Miami, Florida. Villafañe learned of the Miami open casting call and, although she was unable to attend, sent the casting office a video audition. Within three days, she was called to audition for the show's director, Jerry Mitchell, and the Estefans. On April 13, 2015, Villafañe and Josh Segarra were announced on NBC's Today Show as the stars of the Broadway-bound musical.

"I feel a very big responsibility to portray her in a real way", Villafañe said in an exclusive interview with InStyle Magazine. "I don't think you can actually replicate Gloria Estefan—you can only do your best to tell her story and be true to the music. I grew up performing her music at talent shows, "Reach" was the first song i ever sang in public when i was 9 years old. That's what we would jam to on our way to school".

Villafañe made her Broadway debut in the role on October 5, 2015, ahead of the show's official opening night at the Marquis Theatre on November 5, 2015. Both she and the show received rave reviews, and Villafañe was named one of The Hollywood Reporter’s top "Broadway Breakout Stars of the Year" She won a Theatre World Award and was nominated for the Outer Critics Circle Award, Drama League Award and Astaire Awards.

Villafañe joined multiple Latin artists on Lin-Manuel Miranda's "Almost Like Praying" in 2017. All proceeds from the song went to help Puerto Rico after being devastated by Hurricane Maria.

In June 2021, Villafañe was cast as a lead in the NBC series Night Court, the sequel to the classic sitcom, but she was replaced by India de Beaufort when the pilot was given a series order.

From September 2021 until January 2022, she starred as Roxie Hart in the reopening of Chicago on Broadway. In the fall of 2025, she portrayed Lola opposite Jordan Donica in Damn Yankees at Arena Stage.

Although originally cast in Bad Monkey, it was announced Natalie Martinez would replace her, after the character was rewritten to be older.

== Filmography ==
Year	Title	Role	Notes
2008	Dostana	Runway model	Hindi Movie (Indian)
2009	I Love You Phillip Morris	Bikini Girl	Uncredited
2010	America's Most Wanted	Felicia Ruiz	Episode: "Jesus Salazaar"
2011	Los Americans	Jennifer	Series regular; 7 episodes
2011	Magic City Memoirs	Catalina	
2012	Hiding	Jo Russo / Alicia Torres	Video
2012	Adam & Abby	Abby Apfelbaum	Video
2013	Rizzoli & Isles	Isabella Valdez	Episode: "But I Am a Good Girl"
2013	Grand Theft Auto V	The Local Population (voice)	Video Game
2015	South Beach	Carmen Suarez	Series regular; 6 episodes
2016	Max Steel	Sofia Martinez	
2016	Mozart in the Jungle	Rodrigo's Dance Partner	Episode: "You're the Best or You F'ing Suck"
2018	History of Them	Luna Reyes	TV movie
2019–2020	New Amsterdam	Dr. Valentina Castro	Recurring role; 11 episodes
2019	Sunnyside	Diana Barea	Recurring role; 5 episodes
2021	Younger	KT	3 episodes
2025	WondLa	Eight/Eva 8 (voice)	7 episodes
TBA	Castro's Daughter	Alina Fernández	Upcoming

=== Theater ===
Off-Broadway

Year	Title	Role	Venue
2024	N/A	A	Mitzi E. Newhouse Theater, New York City
