= C. J. Chivers =

American journalist and author (born 1964)

C.J. Chivers
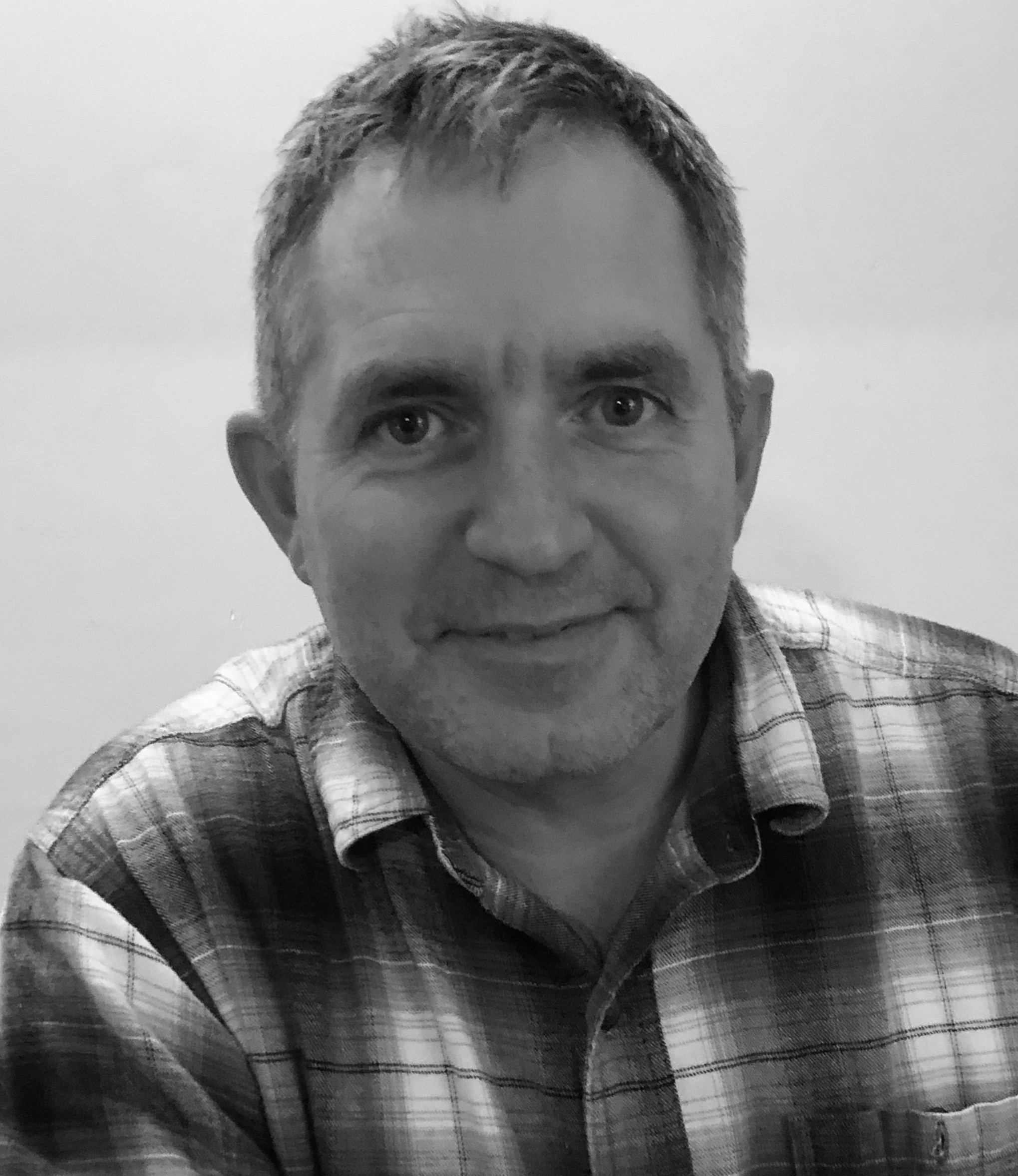
- Born: Christopher John Chivers; 1964 (age 61–62); Binghamton, New York, U.S.
- Education: Cornell University, Columbia University Graduate School of Journalism
- Occupations: Journalist, Marine
- Agent: Stuart Krichevsky Literary Agency
- Notable credit(s): The New York Times, Esquire, Foreign Affairs, Wired, Providence Journal, Field & Stream, Salt Water Sportsman, Surfer; 2007 Michael Kelly Award winner
- Spouse: Suzanne Keating
- Children: five
- Military career
- Allegiance: United States
- Branch: United States Marine Corps
- Service years: 1988-1994
- Rank: Captain
- Unit: USS Kitty Hawk (CV-63)
- Conflicts: Gulf War; 1992 Los Angeles riots
- Website: cjchivers.com

Christopher John Chivers (born 1964) is an American journalist and author best known for his work with The New York Times and Esquire magazine. As of 2017 he is assigned to The New York Times Magazine and the newspaper's Investigations Desk as a long-form writer and investigative reporter. In the summer of 2007, he was named the newspaper's Moscow bureau chief, replacing Steven Lee Myers.

Along with several reporters and photographers based in Pakistan and Afghanistan, he contributed to a New York Times staff entry that received the Pulitzer Prize for International Reporting in 2009. He received the Pulitzer Prize for Feature Writing in 2017. His book, The Gun, a work of history published under the Simon & Schuster imprint, was released in October 2010. Chivers is considered one of the most important war correspondents of his generation, noted for his expertise on weapons.

== Education and military service ==
Chivers attended the College of Arts and Sciences at Cornell University. There he played defensive line for sprint football for four years, and was a member of Alpha Tau Omega fraternity. After graduating in January 1988, Chivers served as an infantry officer in the U.S. Marine Corps. He graduated from the United States Army's Ranger School, served in the first Gulf War and in peacekeeping operations during the Los Angeles riots in 1992 before being honorably discharged as a captain in 1994. Chivers graduated from the Columbia University Graduate School of Journalism a year later.

== Career ==
Chivers reported for the Providence Journal on the Providence city government from 1995 to 1999.

From 1999 to 2001 Chivers covered crime and law enforcement in New York City for The New York Times, working out of a three-person bureau co-located inside New York Police Department Headquarters in Lower Manhattan. He was there on the morning of the September 11 attacks, and discreetly reported from Ground Zero for the Times for the next twelve days, parlaying his Marine identity and volunteering in order to remain after most of the press was cleared to facilitate rescue, recovery, and clean-up efforts. Chivers' first publication in Esquire magazine was a September, 2002 retelling of the early days at Ground Zero.

In 2001, Chivers became a foreign correspondent for The New York Times. He has reported from Afghanistan, Syria, Israel, Palestine, Iraq, Libya, Uganda, Chechnya and Beslan. He served as Moscow correspondent from 2004 through 2007, and was Moscow bureau chief in 2007 and 2008. In Uzbekistan, he covered the Andijan massacre in 2005. Chivers also contributed to The Times' "At War" and "Lens" news blogs.

In 2013 Chivers published an article in The New York Times about the ordeal of photojournalist Matt Schrier as hostage in the hands of Syrian rebels while his cellmate journalist Peter Theo Curtis still was held captive. Chivers disclosed that Curtis had helped Schrier escape, putting Curtis in jeopardy and delivering him to abuse by his kidnappers.

The improvised weapons and munitions of Sunni Islamists were an important focus of his reporting on Libya in 2011 and on Syria in 2012. In 2015 Esquire magazine said Chivers was "the most important war correspondent of his time", saying he developed "a brand of journalism unique in the world for, among other things, its study of the weapons we use to kill one another".

After reporting on a firefight—whether he was in Iraq, Afghanistan, South Ossetia, Libya, or Syria—he'd look for shell casings and ordnance fragments. If he was embedded with American soldiers or Marines, he'd ask them if he could look through what they had found for an hour or so—'finger fucking,' he'd call it—and ask his photographer to take pictures of ammunition stamps and serial numbers. Over time and in this way he would reveal a vast world of small-arms trade and secret trafficking that no other journalist had known existed before.

Chivers is now assigned to The New York Times Magazine and the newspaper's Investigations Desk as a long-form writer and investigative reporter.

== Books ==
In 2010 Chivers published his first book, The Gun on the history of automatic rifles. The scope included the biographies of Hiram Maxim, Richard Gatlin, Paul Mauser, John T. Thompson, their eponymous automatic weapons, and their impact on warfare; the origin of the Soviet AK-47 rifle; and the contest between the AK-47 and the M16 in the Vietnam War, and the spread of the adoption of the AK-47 by criminal, non-military, non-state actors. Reviews were generally favorable; reviewers noted the coverage of both technical aspects and social impacts, that the narrative is a human story, involving inventors, generals, and casualties, and that Chivers' experiences as Marine, journalist, and weapons expert informed the work.

In August 2018 his second book The Fighters about Americans in conflict in Afghanistan and Iraq will be published. An advance review in the Kirkus Reviews May 1, 2018, issue the reviewer notes:

Given his background, Chivers certainly did not set out to write a book emphasizing the foolishness of American actions in Afghanistan and Iraq. But that is the story that emerged from his painstaking, courageous reporting, and readers will be thankful for his work.

== Awards ==
=== 1997 ===
In 1997 Chivers was granted a Pulitzer International Traveling Fellowship to partially underwrite a series of reports on the collapse of commercial fishing in the North Atlantic entitled "Empty Nets: Atlantic Banks in Peril" for The Providence Journal. In 1997, at age 32, Chivers received the Livingston Award, awarded to a journalist under 35 years of age in the category of Excellence in International Reporting, for the series. The award is sometimes known as the "Pulitzer Prize for the young".

=== 2002 ===
Two of Chivers' stories from Afghanistan were included in The New York Times' submission to the 2002 Pulitzer Prize for Public Service, which was awarded to the team behind A Nation Challenged, "a special section published regularly after the September 11th terrorist attacks." In 2010 A Nation Challenged was recognized by a committee of judges organized by the Arthur L. Carter Journalism Institute at New York University as one of the Top Ten Works of Journalism of the Decade 2000-2009.

=== 2004 ===
With Steven Lee Myers, Chivers received a citation for best newspaper reporting from abroad from the Overseas Press Club for coverage of the 2004 Beslan school hostage crisis in The Times.

=== 2007 ===
Chivers and his editor at Esquire magazine David Granger were recipients of the 2007 Michael Kelly Award and National Magazine Award (Elle Award) For Reporting for "The School", an 18,000-word reconstruction of the 2004 Beslan school hostage crisis. The Kelly Award judges said, "Chivers produced an extraordinary hour-by-hour account of the school siege that is impossible to put down. Through careful, persistent reporting, Chivers provided Esquire readers with a haunting look at how innocent hostages, Chechen terrorists, and Russian authorities responded to a crisis that left 362 dead." The American Society of Magazine Editors said, "Chivers recounts, in astonishing and chilling detail, the progress of the three-day siege by Chechen terrorists at School No. 1 in the Russian town of Beslan. Told with economy yet packed with detail, The School presents scenes and images that compel the readers attention, and may haunt them for decades to come." "The School" was optioned for a feature film by Imagine Entertainment. In November 2008, Esquire's editors named "The School" one of the seven greatest stories in the history of the magazine.

Chivers was the 2007 winner of the Jesse Laventhol Prize for Deadline Reporting, awarded by the American Society of Newspaper Editors for his account in The Times of a Navy corpsman's efforts to save a Marine wounded by a sniper in Al Anbar Governorate, Iraq.

=== 2009 ===
As a member of The New York Times team, Chivers shared in the 2009 Pulitzer Prize for International Reporting which recognized their "masterful, groundbreaking coverage of America's deepening military and political challenges in Afghanistan and Pakistan, reporting frequently done under perilous conditions."

=== 2010 ===
Chivers was a finalist for the 2010 American Society of News Editors Batten Medal.

=== 2011 ===
Chivers won the 2011 George Polk Awards in Journalism in the category of Military Reporting presented by Long Island University, citing his "courageous and illuminating coverage of the wars in Libya and Afghanistan" and his "weapons expertise". The Polk Award judges cited Chivers' reports from inside rebel-held Misurata, Libya documenting the use of Spanish-manufactured cluster munitions by forces loyal to Muammar Gaddafi on civilian areas, and from Forward Operating Base Sharana in Afghanistan documenting the "frustration of American troops under attack from beyond the Pakistan border".

He won the 2011 Hal Boyle Award, presented by the Overseas Press Club, in recognition of the "best newspaper or news service reporting from abroad," for war reports from Libya and Afghanistan in The New York Times.

=== 2012 ===
On November 29, 2012, Chivers delivered the 32nd Joe Alex Morris Jr. Memorial Lecture at the Nieman Foundation for Journalism at Harvard University, an invited talk on the topic of international reporting which honors an American overseas correspondent or commentator on foreign affairs.

In 2012 Chivers was nominated one of "the 100 Outstanding Journalists in the United States in the Last 100 Years" by the faculty of the New York University Arthur L. Carter Journalism Institute.

=== 2013 ===
In 2013 the staff of the British non-profit Action on Armed Violence named Chivers one of "the most influential writers and broadcasters covering armed violence and conflict around the world".

=== 2014 ===
In 2014, Chivers investigated and reported for The New York Times on the use of chemical weapons and nerve agents against hundreds of American and American-trained Iraqi troops between 2004 and 2011 in Iraq. The Atlantic magazine described Chivers as the Times' "longtime conflict and arms reporter" and as "one of the world’s top conflict reporters" and described the reporting as "the Iraq War's Biggest Untold Story". Chivers won the 2014 best investigative reporting award from the Overseas Press Club for his report "The Secret Casualties of Iraq's Abandoned Chemical Weapons" in The Times.

=== 2017 ===
Chivers won the Pulitzer Prize for Feature Writing as an individual. The citation read "For showing, through an artful accumulation of fact and detail, that a Marine’s postwar descent into violence reflected neither the actions of a simple criminal nor a stereotypical case of PTSD (Posttraumatic stress disorder)." His winning article, "The Fighter", in The New York Times Magazine tells the story of "a veteran infantry combat Marine who was struggling with adjusting to life after serving in the war in Afghanistan".

== Personal ==
Chivers, his wife, and five children have resided in South Kingstown, Rhode Island since 2008.

== Bibliography ==
=== Selected articles ===
- Chivers, C. J. (August 18, 1996). "Empty Nets: Atlantic Banks in Peril" (PDF). The Providence Journal. (1997 Livingston Award for Excellence in International Reporting)
- Chivers, C. J. (September 30, 2001). "A Nation Challenged: The Scene; Ground Zero Diary: 12 Days of Fire and Grit". The New York Times.
- Chivers, C. J. (December 9, 2001). "New Leaders Send a Signal by Hanging Bandit's Body". The New York Times. p. B.4. (2002 Pulitzer Prize for Public Service; archived at The Pulitzer Prizes: The New York Times)
- Chivers, C. J. (December 31, 2001). "A Nation Challenged: Reporter's Diary; Two Worlds Paired by War: Life or Death, as Luck Will Have It". The New York Times. (2002 Pulitzer Prize for Public Service; archived at The Pulitzer Prizes: The New York Times)
- Chivers, C. J. (September 2002). "September". Esquire. (reprinted as Chivers, C. J. (September 11, 2016). "12 Days at Ground Zero". Esquire.)
- Chivers, C. J. (November 2, 2006). "Tending a Fallen Marine, With Skill, Prayer and Fury". The New York Times. (2007 Jesse Laventhol Prize for Deadline Reporting)
- Chivers, C. J. (March 14, 2007). "The School". Esquire. (2007 Michael Kelly Award, National Magazine Award)
- Chivers, C. J. (September 15, 2010). "What's Inside a Taliban Gun Locker?". The New York Times.
- Chivers, C. J. (January–February 2011). "Small Arms, Big Problems: The Fallout of the Global Gun Trade". Foreign Affairs.
- Chivers, C. J. (April 15, 2011). "Qaddafi Troops Fire Cluster Bombs Into Civilian Areas". The New York Times. (2011 Overseas Press Club Hal Boyle Award)
- Chivers, C. J. (October 16, 2011). "Tensions Flare as G.I.'s Take Fire Out of Pakistan". The New York Times. (2011 Overseas Press Club Hal Boyle Award)
- Chivers, C. J. (August 22, 2013). "American tells of odyssey as prisoner of Syrian rebels". The New York Times.
- Chivers, C. J. (October 14, 2014). "The Secret Casualties of Iraq's Abandoned Chemical Weapons". The New York Times. (2014 Overseas Press Club best investigative reporting)
- Chivers, C. J. (December 28, 2016). "The Fighter". The New York Times Magazine. (2017 Pulitzer Prize for Feature Writing)

=== Books ===
- Chivers, C. J. (2010). The Gun. New York: Simon & Schuster. ISBN 978-0-74327-07-6-2.
- Chivers, C. J. (2018). The Fighters. New York: Simon & Schuster. ISBN 9781451676679.
