= Mauser (disambiguation) =

Mauser is a German arms manufacturer.

Mauser may also refer to:

- Daniel Mauser (1983-1999), American murder victim
- Paul Mauser (1838–1914), German weapon designer and manufacturer/industrialist
- Siegfried Mauser (born 1954), German pianist
- Wilhelm Mauser (1834–1882), German weapon designer and manufacturer/industrialist
