= The Gun (Chivers book) =

2010 history book by C. J. Chivers

- Author: C. J. Chivers
- Language: English
- Genre: Non-fiction, military history
- Publisher: Simon & Schuster
- Publication date: Oct 12, 2010
- Publication place: United States
- Pages: 496
- ISBN: 0-74327-07-6-2
- OCLC: 795609613
- Website: cjchivers.com/aboutthegun

The Gun is a nonfiction book written by journalist C. J. Chivers about the AK-47 rifle and its variants, and the impact they have had on the world. It covers the origins of the design, its invention and distribution, and the consequences of the pattern's spread around the world.

== Synopsis ==
A prologue relates two events in 1949 in the Soviet Union marking the beginning of the Cold War: the first Soviet nuclear test and innovation in the development of the automatic rifle; the former made total war unwinnable and the latter made smaller proxy wars the principal activity of the Cold War, and automatic rifles would prove the most lethal weapons of the Cold War.

=== Origins ===
Roughly the first third of the book is devoted to the history of the development of automatic firearms, including the biographies of Hiram Maxim, Richard Gatling, Paul Mauser, John T. Thompson, their eponymous automatic weapons, and their impact on warfare.

=== Invention and distribution ===
Chivers deconstructs the Soviet origin mythology of the Kalashnikov rifle. Chivers draws in part from his interview of Mikhail Kalashnikov.

=== Aftermath ===
Roughly the final third of the book covers the contest between the AK-47 and the M16 in the Vietnam War, and the spread of the adoption of the AK-47 by criminal, non-military, non-state actors.

== Reviews ==
Reviews were generally favorable. Reviewers contrasted the broad scope of the book (automatic rifles) with its nominal scope (the Kalashnikov rifles), and noted the coverage of both technical aspects and social impacts and that the narrative is a human story, involving inventors, generals, and casualties. According to reviewers, Chivers' experiences as Marine, journalist, and weapons expert informed the work. The most common criticism was that some topics were considered diversions by reviewers who took the central topic to be the development of the Kalashnikov pattern or the contest between the AK-47 and the United States' M16 in the Vietnam War.
