= Austin Tice =

American freelance journalist kidnapped in Syria (born 1981)

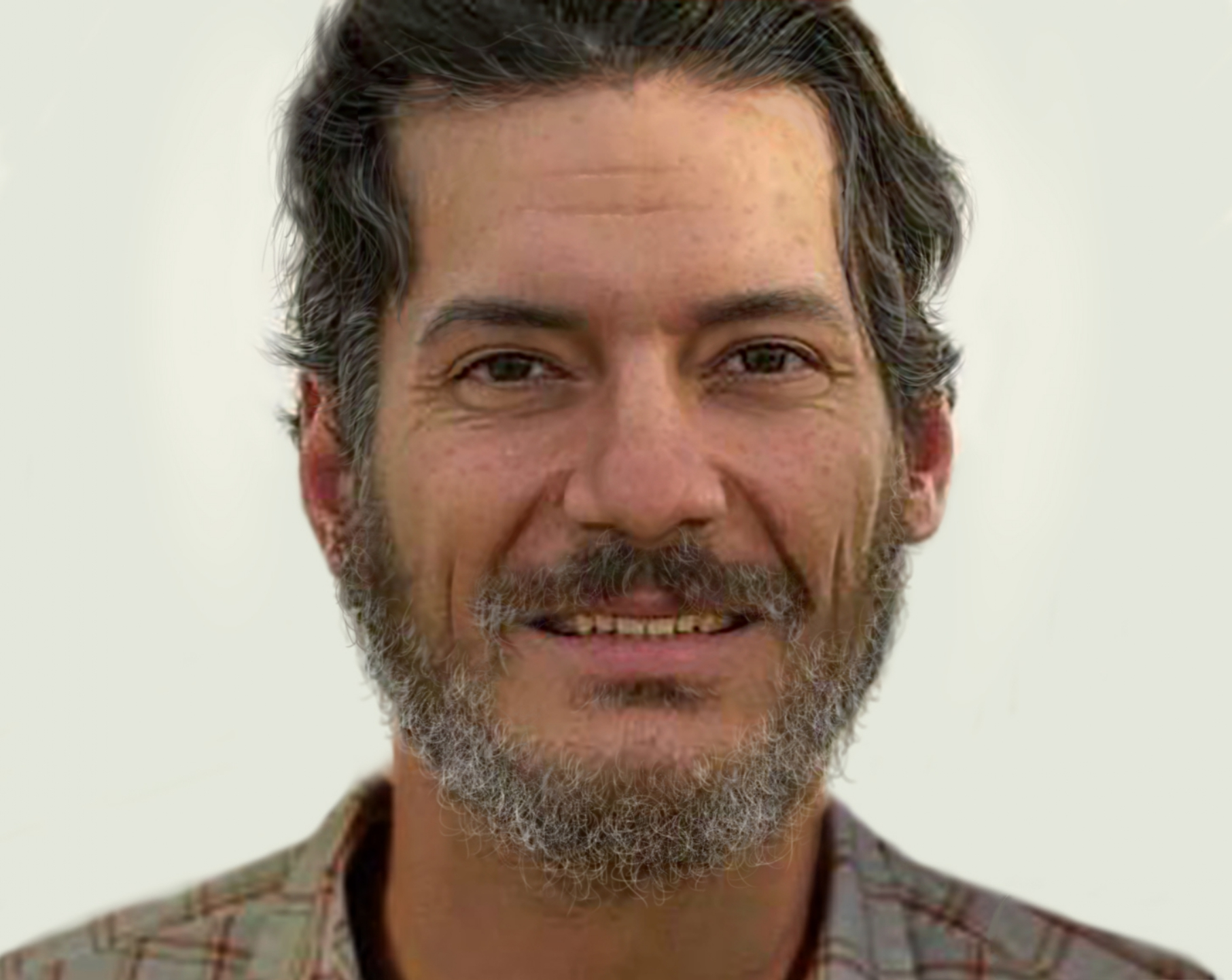
- Age-progressed photo of Austin Tice as of 2024
- Born: Austin Bennett Tice; August 11, 1981; Plano, Texas, US
- Disappeared: August 13, 2012 (aged 31); Darayya, Syria
- Status: Missing for 14 years, 3 months and 3 days
- Education: Georgetown University, 2002
- Occupation: Journalist
- Military career
- Allegiance: United States
- Branch: United States Marine Corps; Marine Corps Reserve
- Rank: Captain
- Conflict: War on terror; Afghan War; Iraq War

Austin Bennett Tice (born August 11, 1981) is an American freelance journalist and veteran U.S. Marine Corps captain who was kidnapped on August 13, 2012, while reporting in Syria. If alive today, Tice would be the longest detained American journalist in history and the second-longest detained journalist in the world after Dawit Isaak, assuming Isaak is still alive. Beginning in 2012, the U.S. government maintained that Tice had been held by the Bashar al-Assad regime. This was confirmed in June 2025 by Syrian intelligence files uncovered by the BBC and by statements from former Syrian officials after the fall of Assad.

== Early life and education ==
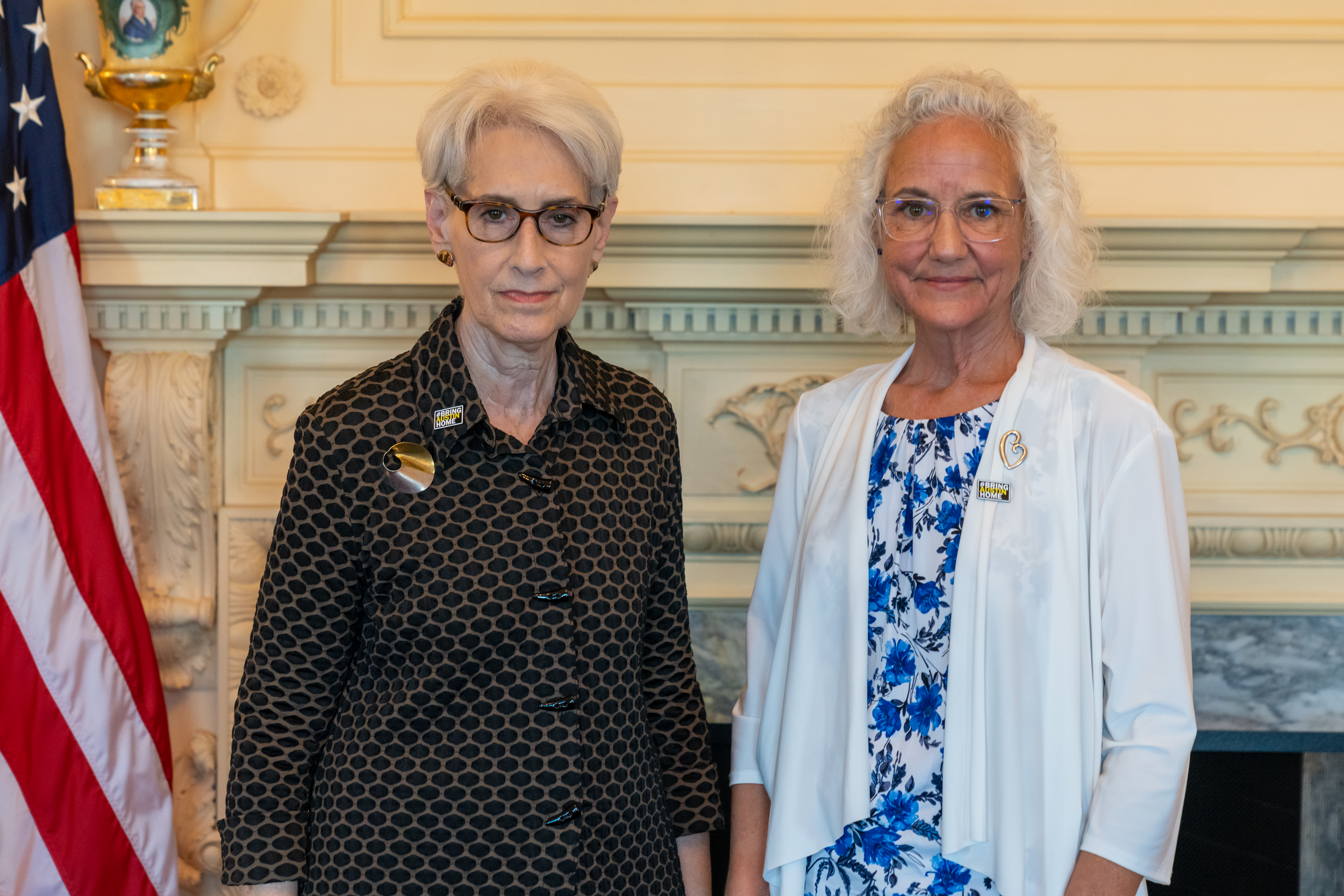
Debra Tice (right), mother of Austin Tice, with US Deputy Secretary of State Wendy Sherman (left) in 2022

Tice was born on August 11, 1981 in Plano, Texas to Marc Tice and Debra Tice. The eldest of seven siblings, Tice was raised in Houston where he was an Eagle Scout and dreamed of becoming an international correspondent for NPR.

In 1997, aged 16, Tice enrolled at the University of Houston before later transferring to Edmund A. Walsh School of Foreign Service at Georgetown University a year later. Tice graduated from Georgetown University in 2002.

== Career ==
In the 2000s, Tice became a United States Marine Corps infantry officer and served tours of duty in Afghanistan and Iraq. He left active duty as a Captain but remained in the Marine Corps Reserve.

=== Journalism ===
Enrolling at Georgetown University Law Center, Tice completed two years of study before going to Syria as a freelance journalist during the summer break before his third and final year of law studies. Tice's father said, "He was hearing reports from Syria saying this is happening and that is happening but it can't be confirmed because there really are no reporters on the ground. And he said, 'You know, this is a story that the world needs to know about.'" He was one of only a few foreign journalists to report from inside Syria during the intensification of the civil war. He entered the country in May 2012 and traveled through central Syria, filing battlefield dispatches before arriving in Damascus in late July 2012.

Tice became one of the first American correspondents to witness Syrian-rebel confrontations. His coverage was cited, along with efforts of additional reporters, as contributing to McClatchy winning a George Polk Award for war reporting for its coverage of Syria's civil war.

Tice's reporting garnered his Twitter account 2,000 followers. He stopped tweeting after August 11, 2012.

== Abduction ==
While working as a freelance journalist for McClatchy, The Washington Post, CBS and other media outlets, Tice was abducted in Darayya, Syria, after his driver Hamid Abu Obeid tipped off pro-Assad militiamen of the National Defence Forces and held Tice at gunpoint at a checkpoint. There was no immediate contact from Tice or his captors, but in September 2012 a 47-second video of Tice blindfolded and bound was released.

No group or government ever claimed responsibility for his disappearance.

=== Imprisonment ===
In October 2012, the U.S. government believed, based on the limited information it had, that Tice was in the custody of the Assad regime.

In April 2018, the FBI increased their reward for information regarding Tice's whereabouts to $1 million.

Two US officials said Tice was believed to still be alive, and the State Department said in August 2018 that the US government still believed Tice was being held by the Syrian government or its allies. The U.S. government maintained "ongoing dialogue" with the Syrian government regarding Tice.

In November 2018, Reuters reported that Robert C. O'Brien, the US Special Presidential Envoy for Hostage Affairs, had called on Russia to "exert whatever influence they have in Syria" to secure Tice's release. The Syrian government said that it was unaware of Tice's whereabouts.

In December 2018, Tice's parents announced during a press conference that they had received new information that indicated their son was still alive without elaborating further. Speaking to reporters from Beirut, Tice's parents said they believed that the best chance of Tice's release would come from direct talks between the US and Syrian governments.

In summer 2020, Kash Patel, then White House counterterrorism adviser, travelled secretly to Damascus with Roger Carstens, US hostage negotiator, in an attempt to win the release of Tice.

After Tice's disappearance was mentioned by WHCA president Steven Portnoy at the 2022 White House Correspondents Dinner, President Joe Biden invited Tice's parents to the White House for a meeting. Following the 45 minute meeting, his parents said they were hopeful for his return. As part of a statement issued to mark the tenth anniversary of Tice's captivity, Biden noted that the US government knew "with certainty" that the journalist was being held by the Syrian government.

In a statement released on May 3, 2024, (World Press Freedom Day 2024), President Biden stated Tice remained a hostage in Syria.

In a speech on December 8, 2024, following the fall of the Assad regime, President Biden said that "We believe [Tice]'s alive [...] we think we can get him back, but we have no direct evidence of that yet." Several papers have reported that fellow detainees saw Tice as recently as 2022. Reports subsequently emerged that Tice was able to escape from his cell in early 2013 after five months of captivity and was found wandering through the Mazzeh neighborhood of Damascus. This was the first time Tice had been publicly seen since his abduction. After being spotted by locals, he went to the house of a prominent Syrian family, but was soon recaptured. On December 18, 2024, Israeli Prime Minister Benjamin Netanyahu promised that he would not strike the area near the prison where Tice might be held. His mother had sent him a letter two days earlier, urging him to halt Israel’s airstrikes in Syria to enable the search for him to continue.

In June 2025, Syrian intelligence files uncovered by the BBC and confirmation from former Syrian officials confirmed that Austin Tice had been held by the Assad regime. The BBC found that the FBI and CIA had interviewed Major General Bassam al-Hassan, a former Assad regime official who is accused of being responsible for holding Tice captive, multiple times earlier in the year. Hassan told the investigators that the regime had Tice executed in 2013, a claim that has not been corroborated.

In May 2026, Tice's family claimed that he was still alive and that he may have been transferred from Syria to Iran. Naomi Tice, Austin's sister, stated that the family has information that the Islamic Revolutionary Guard Corps allegedly moved him from Syria to Iran, either during or after the fall of Assad.

In October 2026, a joint investigation by the BBC and NPR into Tice's disappearance revealed that Major General Hassan was being harbored in Lebanon with the approval of American authorities due to his claimed willingness to provide information. Hassan was noted as having supplied the location of a potential gravesite; while no remains were found, two sources who claimed to be familiar with the search said that only part of the site had been excavated by the time the search was concluded.

== See also ==
- 2014 ISIL beheading incidents
- Foreign hostages in Iraq
- List of kidnappings
- Kenneth Bigley
- Nick Berg
- Peter Theo Curtis
- James Foley (journalist)
- Daniel Pearl
- Matt Schrier
- Steven Sotloff
