= Mauser Model 1894 =

Mauser Model 1894 may refer to:

- The Brazilian Model 1894, a slightly modified Mauser Model 1893
- The Swedish Mauser Model 1894
