= Mauser C78 "zig-zag" =

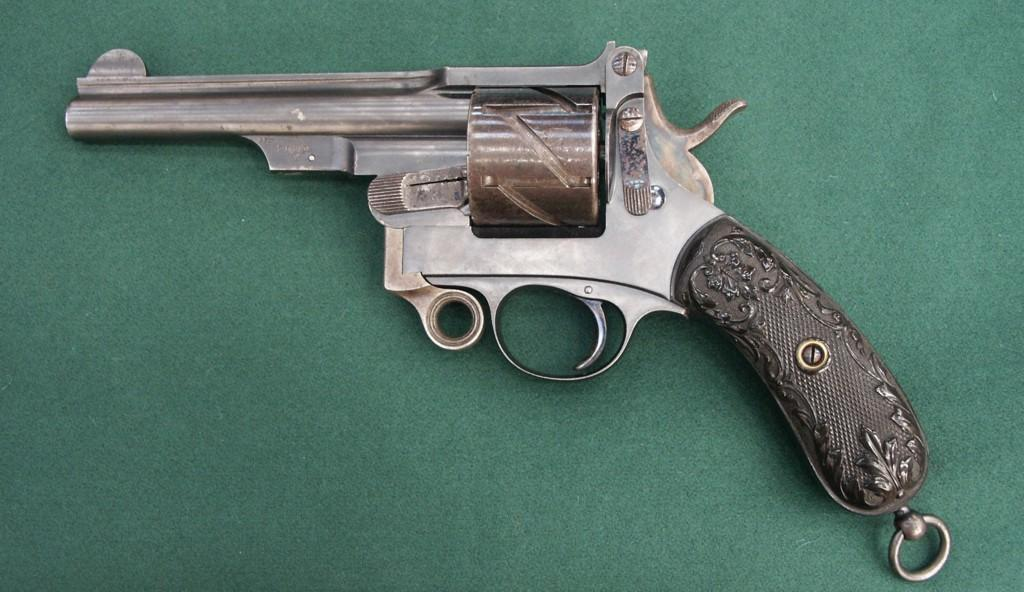
- Mauser Mod.1886 "zig-zag", with tilting barrel. The prominent "zig-zag" pattern is where the revolver got its nickname.
- Type: Revolver
- Place of origin: German Empire

Service history
- In service: 1878–1918 (German Empire)
- Used by: German Empire
- Wars: World War I

Production history
- Designer: Peter-Paul Mauser
- Manufacturer: Mauser
- Produced: 1878–1896

Specifications
- Mass: approx. 900 g
- Barrel length: 13.7 cm
- Cartridge: 7,92 mm, 9 mm, 10.6 mm
- Action: Single action, rocker barrel (Mauser M78)
- Feed system: 6-round cylinder
- Sights: Iron

The Mauser C78 - also known as M78 Oberndorf - is a single-action revolver manufactured by the Mauser company in Oberndorf am Neckar during the late 19th century. It was the first German revolver to be mass-produced for modern center-fire cartridges. It was also called the "zig-zag" in reference to the design of the six-round zig-zag-grooved cylinder and was chambered in various 6 mm to 11 mm calibers.

== History ==
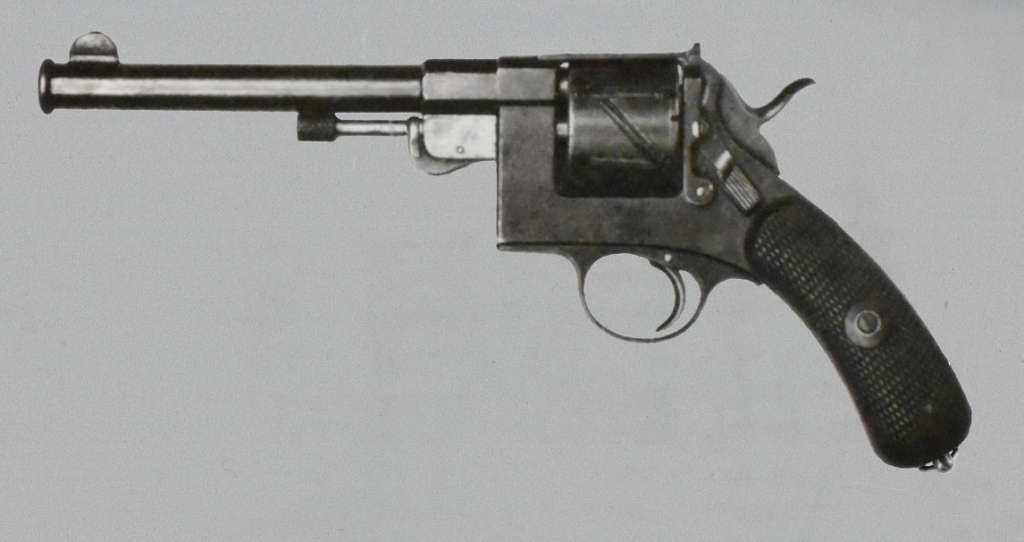
Mauser C78 Revolver, 1st solid frame Model

Designed by Paul Mauser under the factory designation Construktion 1878 (C78), this revolver was his first handgun design. The original C78 zig-zag revolver had a solid frame and loading gate. It was developed as a test model for the 1879 German trials to provide the first German military handgun to fire modern brass cartridges and to replace the earlier needle-fire and pinfire revolvers.

Despite being an efficient and well-finished weapon, the Mauser brothers' attempts to sell it to the German army, especially the army of the Kingdom of Württemberg, did not meet with much success. In 1879 evaluations of different German revolvers were carried out and it was rejected because the "zig-zag" drum was deemed too complex to manufacture. German military chose M1879 Reichsrevolver developed by Spangenberg & Sauer, Suhl, (today J. P. Sauer & Sohn) and later manufactured by various companies. The Mauser C78 was only acquired by a few individual soldiers.

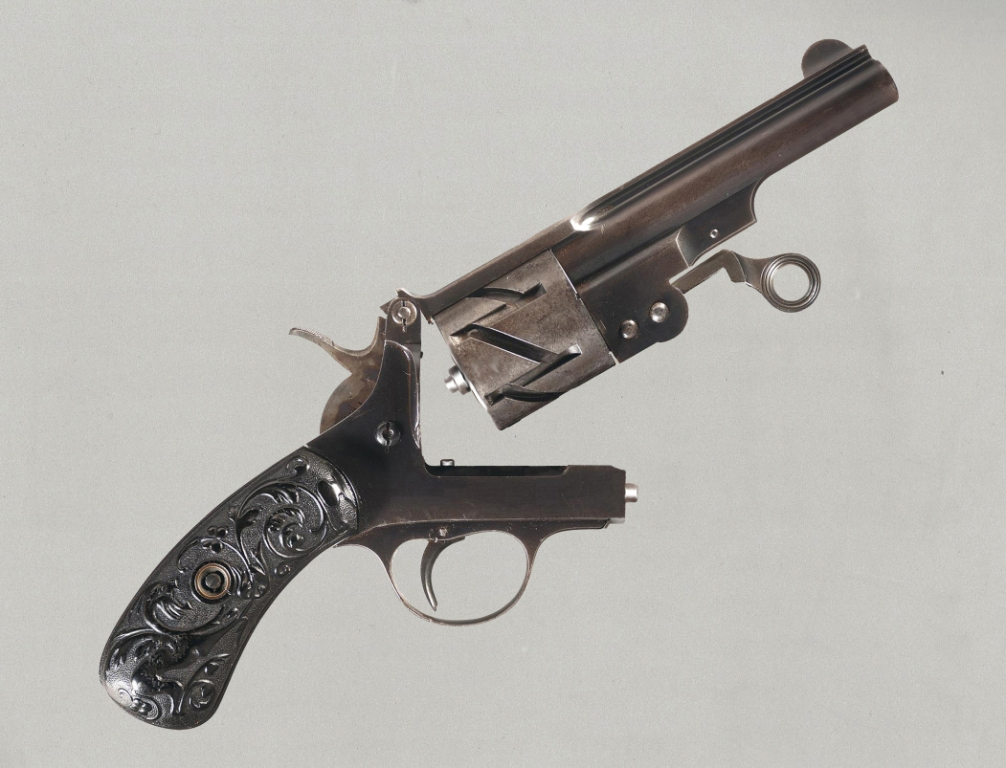
Mauser M78 second model, open

Later, the design evolved into a top break, and a swinging cylinder design and also include a solid frame rifle version. In 1886, an improved 9 mm version with a hinged frame was introduced.

In 1896, the C78 was replaced by the semi-automatic Mauser C96 "broomhandle", but many of the older revolvers remained in use until after World War I.

== Design ==
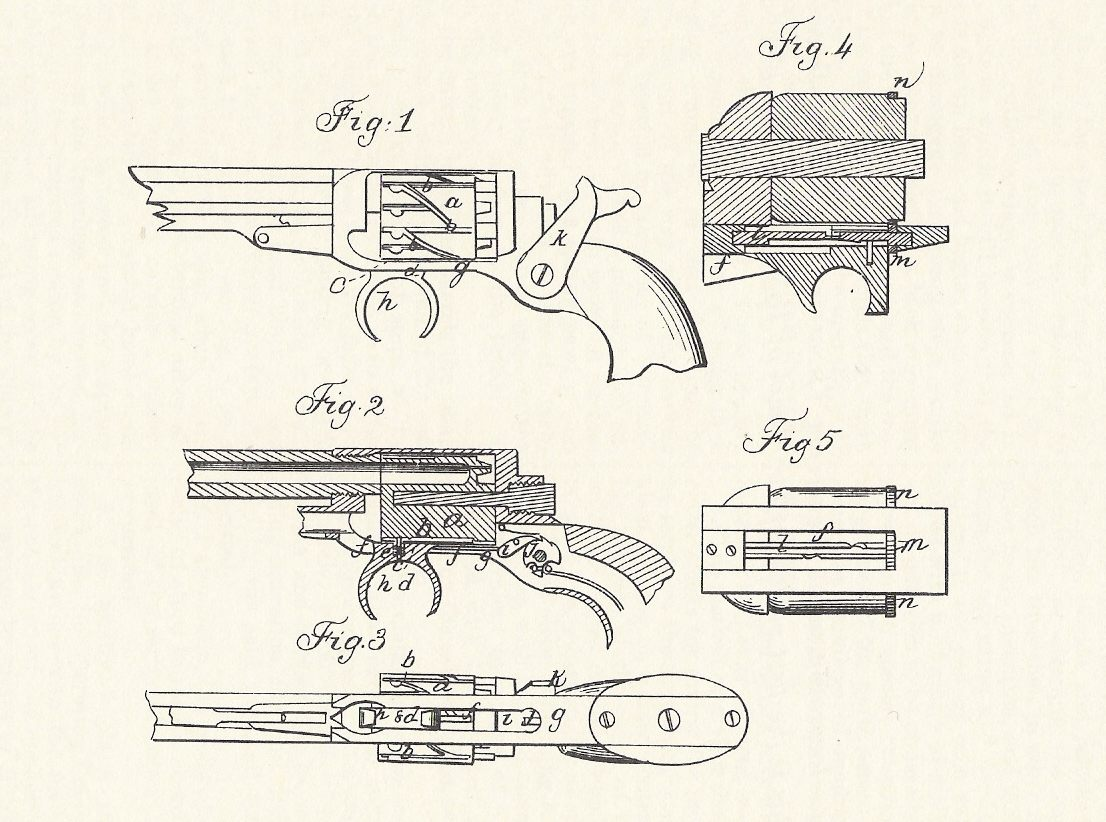
E.K. Roots patent 1855 for cylinder rotation. The Mauser C78 uses same principle.

The first developed C78 models were single-action revolvers (Hahnspanner). They had a closed frame that was loaded through a tailgate. The closed frame was later also used for the manufacture of hunting rifles for hunting small game.

Later models, like the early Smith & Wesson Model 1, were made with a hinged frame. In contrast to the Smith & Wesson, the joint was not attached to the front above the drum, but to the rear, and the drum did not have to be removed for unloading and reloading. As a six-shot revolver, they were made with a single-action or double-action trigger in calibers between 5.6 mm Flobert and centerfire cartridges up to 11 mm. The case was ejected via a manually operated ejector ring, with later models this was done automatically when opening.

=== Function of cylinder rotation ===
The C78 revolver had a special rotating device for the cylinder. Unlike most other revolvers, it is not rotated by a toothed ring at the rear end of the drum, but by a pull rod connected to the hammer with a cam at the rear end. Straight and inclined grooves are milled into the outer surface of the drum. When the cock is cocked, the cam engages in the inclined groove and rotates the drum one sixth to the next chamber. When firing, the hammer shoots forward, the attachment slides back in the straight groove, the drum remains in the firing position and the cartridge is ignited.

This system of drum rotation was developed in 1855 by E. K. Root, an employee of Samuel Colt (US Patent No. 13,999, Dec. 25, 1855, E.K. Root, Revolver) and applied to prototypes of the "Colt Root Revolver". From 1901 to 1924 the system was used in the Webley-Fosbery semi-automatic revolver manufactured by the Webley & Scott Company in Birmingham.

== 3D printed revolver ==
The zig zag is a 9mm caliber 3D printing revolver was released in May 2014. It was created using a $500 3D printer, the branding of which has not been disclosed by the creator. Its creator is a Japanese Kawasaki citizen named Yoshitomo Imura. He was arrested in May 2014, after uploading a video to the internet where he fires a zig zag 3D printed revolver. It was the first Japanese 3D printed revolver that could fire live ammunition.

== See also ==
- Cobray Pocket Pal
- Webley–Fosbery Automatic Revolver
