= Beilharz =

Beilharz is a surname. Notable people with the surname include:

- Johannes Beilharz (born 1956), German poet, painter, and translator
- Linda Beilharz (born 1960), Australian adventurer
- Peter Beilharz (born 1953), Australian sociologist
