= Swedish Mauser =

Gevär m/96 (Model 1896 Rifle)
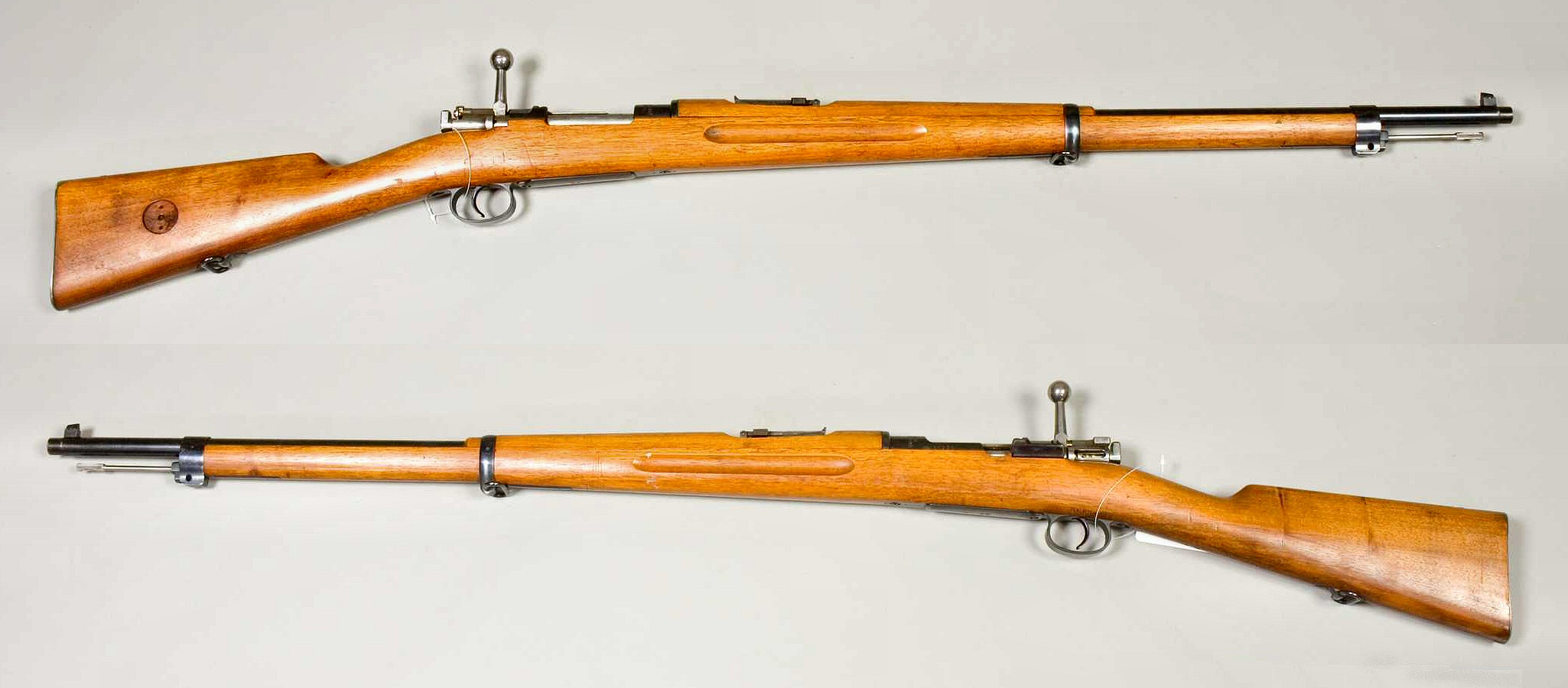
- 6.5 mm Gevär m/1896. Pattern, approved 20 March 1896.
- Type: Bolt-action rifle
- Place of origin: German Empire; Sweden

Service history
- In service: 1895–1995
- Used by: See Users
- Wars: Finnish Civil War; Winter War; Continuation War

Production history
- Designer: Paul Mauser
- Designed: 1893–1896
- Manufacturer: Waffenfabrik Mauser AG; Carl Gustafs stads gevärsfaktori Husqvarna Vapenfabriks AB
- Produced: 1895–1948
- No. built: 750,000 of which 127,000 were m/94 carbines, 535,000 m/96 long rifles and 88,000 m/38 short rifles (converted m/38's not included)
- Variants: m/38 short rifle, m/41 sniper rifle, m/94 carbine.

Specifications
- Mass: Rifle: 4 kg (8.8 lb) carbine: 3.4 kg (7.5 lb)
- Length: m/1894: 950 mm (37 in) m/1896: 1,260 mm (50 in) m/1938: 1,120 mm (44 in)
- Barrel length: m/1894: 450 mm (18 in) m/1896: 739 mm (29.1 in) m/1938: 610 mm (24 in)
- Cartridge: 6.5×55mm Swedish
- Action: Bolt action
- Muzzle velocity: original round nose bullet rifle: 725 m/s (2,380 ft/s) carbine: 655 m/s (2,150 ft/s)
- Effective firing range: 600 m (656 yd) (m/1938) with iron sights 800 m (875 yd) with telescopic sight
- Feed system: 5-round stripper clip, internal magazine
- Sights: Square post front, U notch rear iron sights or telescopic sight

"Swedish Mausers" are a family of bolt-action rifles based on an improved variant of Mauser's earlier Model 1893, but using the 6.5×55mm Swedish cartridge, and incorporating unique design elements as requested by Sweden. These are the m/94 (Model 1894) carbine, m/96 (Model 1896) long rifle, m/38 (Model 1938) short rifle and m/41 (Model 1941) sniper rifle. Production began in 1898 at Carl Gustafs stads gevärsfaktori in Eskilstuna, Sweden.

All Swedish Mausers other than trials rifles were chambered for the 6.5×55mm Swedish cartridge, and all Swedish-made actions were proof-tested with a single 6.5×55mm proof round developing approximately 455 MPa (65,992 psi) piezo pressure (55,000 CUP). Swedish Mausers were manufactured by Waffenfabrik Mauser AG in Oberndorf a/N in Germany and in Sweden by Carl Gustafs stads gevärsfaktori and Husqvarna Vapenfabriks Aktiebolag. All Swedish Mausers, whether built in Germany or Sweden, were fabricated using a Swedish-supplied high grade tool steel alloyed with nickel, copper, and vanadium, a product then noted for its strength and corrosion resistance.

These rifles, like other pre-M 98 system Mauser rifles, lack the third safety locking lug at the rear of the bolt and feature "cock-on-closing" (similar to the contemporary Lee–Enfield rifle) instead of the "cock-on-opening" style found on the German Gewehr 98 and most subsequent bolt-action rifles. The forward receiver ring diameter where the two forward locking lugs achieved lockup is 33 millimetres (1.30 in). The internal magazine can be loaded with single 6.5×55mm rounds by pushing the cartridges into the receiver top opening or via stripper clips. Each stripper clip can hold five rounds to fill the magazine and is inserted into clip guides machined into the rear receiver bridge. After loading, the empty clip is ejected when the bolt is closed. For easier loading a crescent-shaped thumb hole cutout was introduced at the left rear of the receiver top.

== m/1892 Rifle and Carbine ==
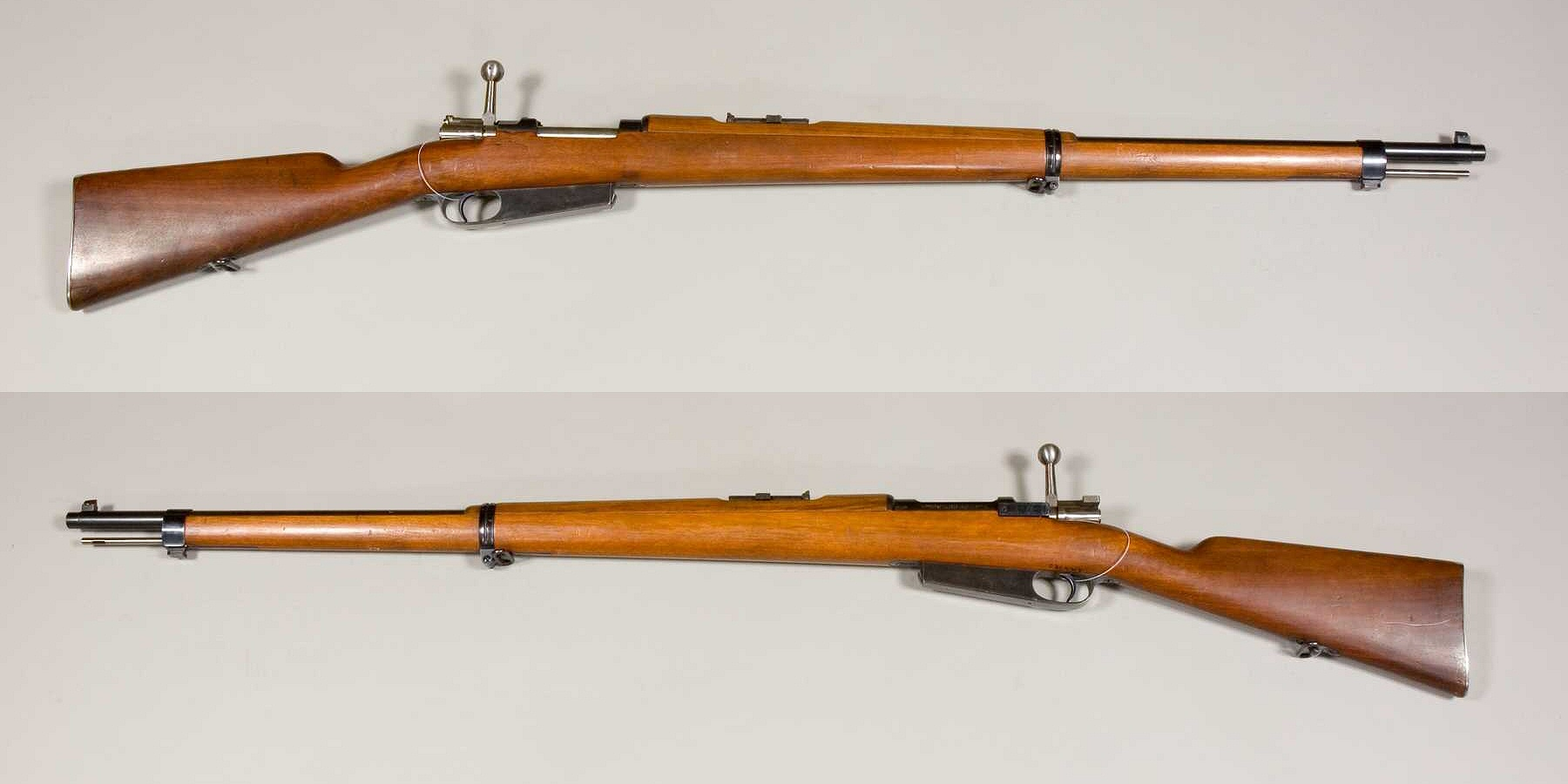
Mauser M1892 long rifle in 8×58mmR Danish Krag, the service rifle caliber in Sweden at the time

Submitted for Swedish trials were the M/1892 rifle and carbine based on elements of the m/1889 Belgian, m/1890 Turkish, and m/1891 Argentine Mauser rifles. These had a single-stack magazine but featured a lot of improvements described in Mauser Model 1893#Development, Spain procured small parties of them for troop trials both in 7.65 and new 7 mm cartridges. Extant examples of these Swedish test firearms are chambered in 8×58mmR Danish Krag, adopted by Sweden in 1889, as well as 6.5.

== m/1894 Carbine ==
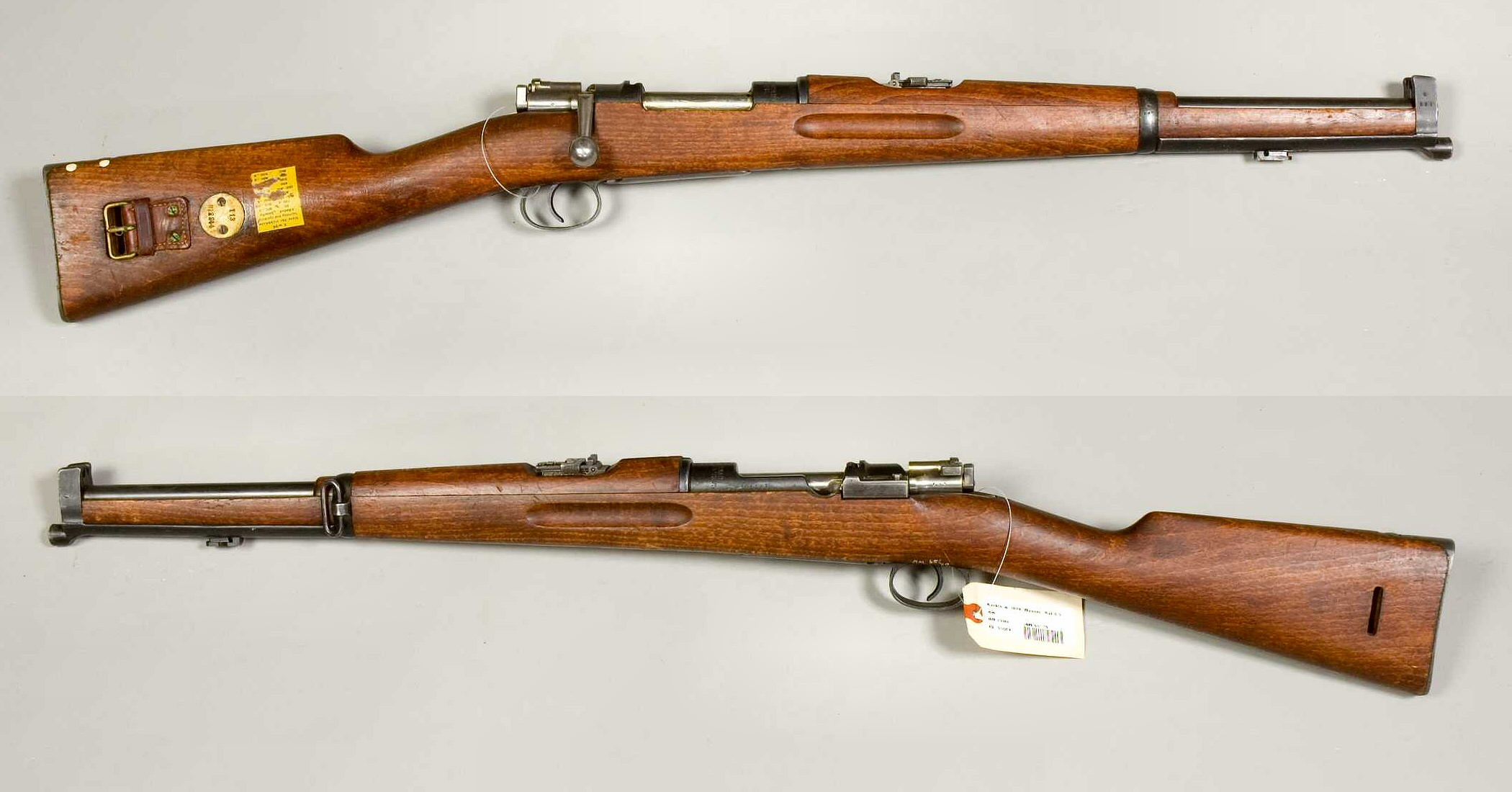
6,5 mm Karbin m/1894 (m/1894-14 with bayonet mount)

The m/1894 carbine with an action similar to the Spanish M1893 was adopted in 1894 with the first 12,000 carbines being manufactured by Waffenfabrik Mauser in Oberndorf am Neckar, Germany. This series of carbines were all manufactured in 1895, and a very few spare receivers dated 1895 were received from Mauser Oberndorf's manufacturers "Ludwig Loewe & Company". Some of these spare receivers have been found built as complete m/1896 rifles with serial numbers falling into the regular m/1896 rifle ranges. It is speculated that these were replacement receivers that were later given the same serial number as the replaced receivers, though this is not yet confirmed due to the extremely small number discovered so far.

Production in Sweden under license commenced in 1898. (The preparatory production development at Carl Gustafs stads gevärsfaktori found a place in history by being the event that caused Carl Edvard Johansson to invent gauge blocks.) Swedish production continued sporadically until 1918. Very limited numbers were later produced with receiver dates of 1929 and more so 1932. The highest 1918 serial number noted is 111,002. The m/94 carbines have a unique serial number sequence beginning with 1. The highest number so far noted is 113,150 dated 1932. There have been no carbines noted with receiver dates of 1902, 1905, 1908, 1909, 1910, 1911, 1912 and 1913. It may be surmised that carbines produced from the end of regular production in 1918 until 1932 numbered about 2,150.

Mauser produced 12,000 m/1894 carbines between 1894 and 1896 and Carl Gustafs stads gevärsfaktori 115,000 m/1894 carbines between 1895 and 1933, giving a total of 127,000 m/1894 carbines.

Some carbines were lost from regular use by conversion to sub-caliber targeting & practice devices for artillery pieces.

The rear sighting element of iron sight lines of the carbines were adjustable for ranges from 200 to 1,600 m (219 to 1,750 yd).

=== Sub variants ===
m/1894-14 carbines have a steel nose piece, not dissimilar to the No.1 Mk3 Lee–Enfield, with a protruding stud under the muzzle for the bayonet ring. There were two bayonets intended for the 94-14 carbine. The most prevalent was the m/1914 long bayonet. The second minor bayonet was the very long bladed m/1915 navy bayonet with the edge facing upwards.

m/1894-67: This was an 1894 carbine modified to accept the m/1867 Yataghan blade saber bayonet. The modification involved a slot machined on the nose cap and a stud sleeve attached to the barrel. Numbers modified are unknown. Possibly only 100 or less. Several have shown up in the United States and one is known in the Netherlands.

Skolskjutningskarbin, (literally "school shooting carbine"): This carbine was manufactured for Swedish civilian schools for student training. All of these school carbines carry the receiver date of 1901. This model deviates from the standard m/1894 carbine in several ways. The serial number is prefixed with S and runs S.1 to S.1161 and possibly a few more. The serial number appears as S.500 on the left side-rail of the receiver. The bolt handle is the same straight handle of the m/1896 rifle. The sling swivels are on the bottom of the stock just as on the m/1896 rifle. There is no bayonet attachment. Many of these carbines have been found rebuilt as standard m/1894-14 carbines and in one case as a Carl Gustaf m/63 target rifle (CG63).

Kammarkarbin: also known as "gallery carbine". Unique serial numbers prefixed by K. Total number produced is unknown, with the highest reported serial number being K.193 currently in a private collection in the United States. One has been reported in Switzerland. Carbine K.91 is in the Carl Gustaf factory museum in Sweden. Other differences from the standard m/1894 carbine include the stock being dyed black. The rifling rate of twist is about 4 times faster than the m/1894 carbine due to the unique bullet and much slower velocity of the special cartridge intended for this carbine. The only two receiver dates noted so far are 1898 and 1901.

1894/96 Fortress Carbine: Another variant produced in unknown numbers and unknown years of production. This carbine is very similar to the standard m/1894 except in the manner of sling attachment. This carbine uses a sling attachment identical to the skolskjutningskarbin as the sling swivels are on the bottom of the stock instead of the side. The lower sling swivel is placed much further up the buttstock nearer the triggerguard than the m/1896 rifle.

Weapons Officers Carbines: These standard m/1894 carbines were hand-built by weapons officers as part of their training. Instead of having serial numbers, the name of the weapons officer is the identifying "serial" mark. Most of the parts are marked with the two letters of the officer's name and in some cases with a + sign. These carbines are among the most valuable of collectible m/1894 carbines.

The m/1894 carbine is still used today by the Royal Guards at Stockholm Palace.

== m/1896 Long Rifle ==
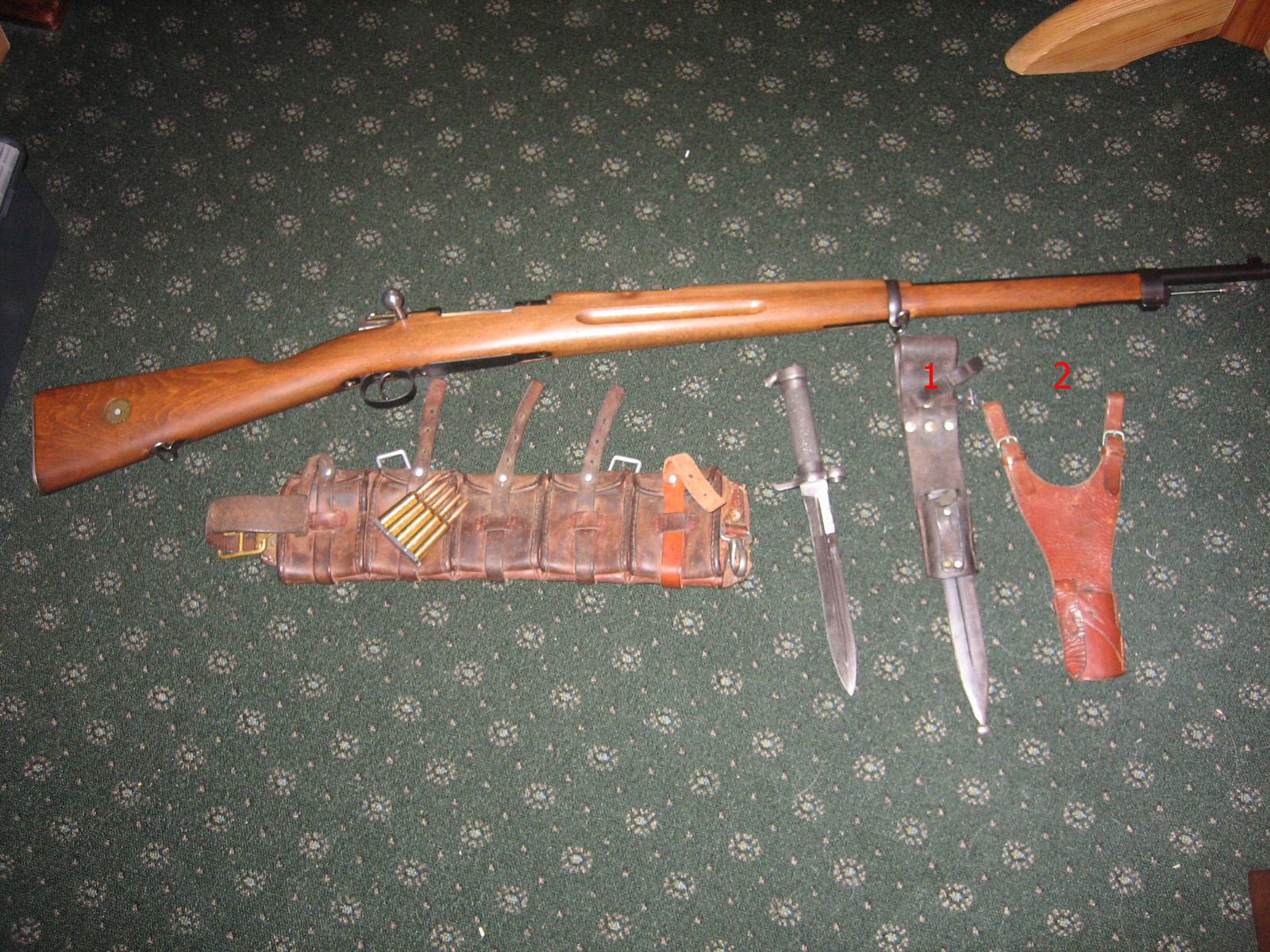
Model 1896 rifle, bayonet, 2 different bayonet frogs and Swedish Cartridge Belt

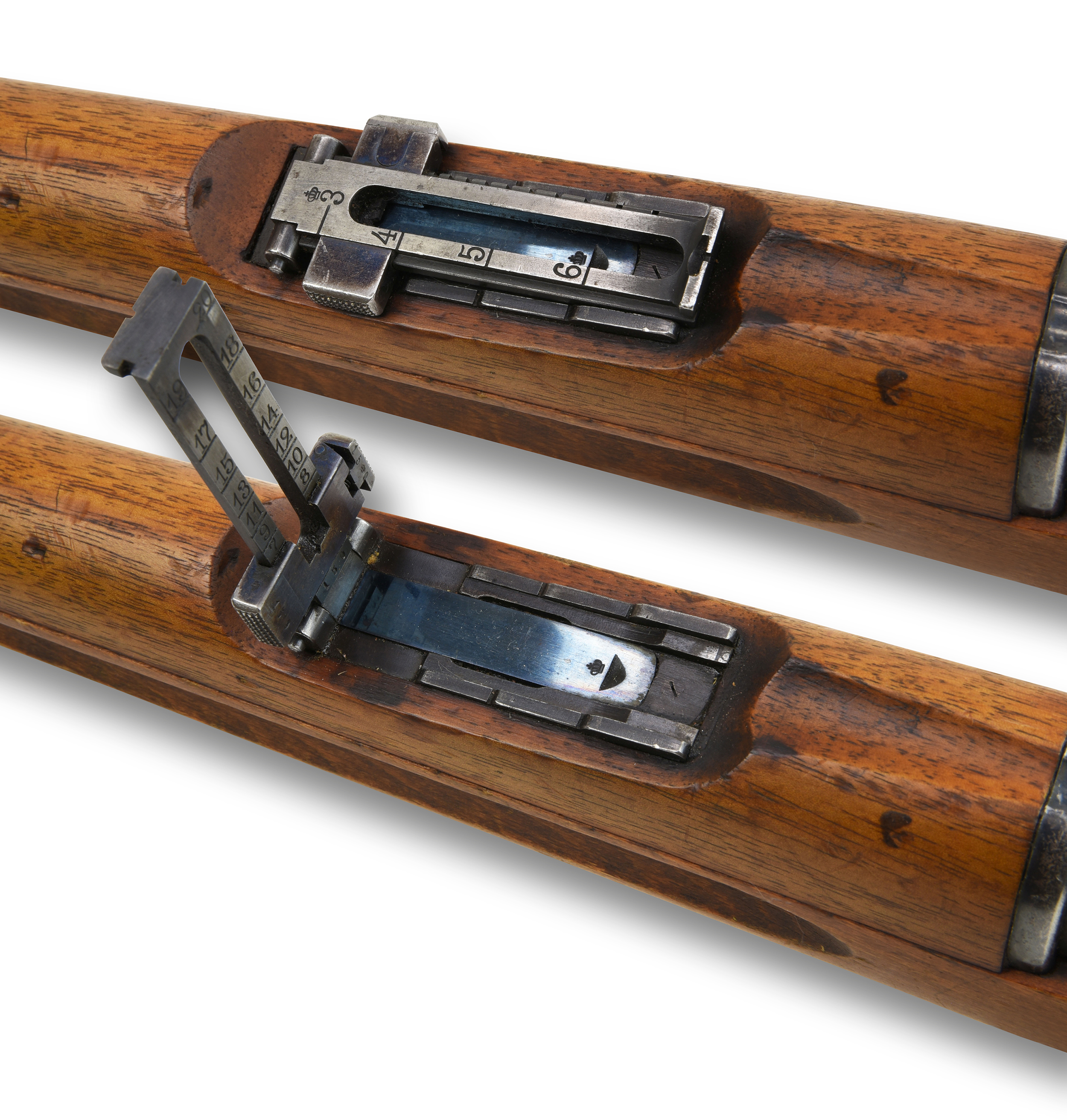
Rear sight of the Model 1896 rifle

The Model 1896 rifle in 6.5×55mm (6,5 mm Gevär m/96) was adopted in 1896 for infantry use, replacing the Model 1867–1889 Remington rolling block rifle in 8×58mmR Danish Krag. Swedish production (under license) started in 1898 at Carl Gustafs, but additional rifles were produced by Mauser during 1899 and 1900 because of delays in shipping additional production machinery from Germany to Sweden.

Standard production at Carl Gustafs continued until 1925, but approximately 18,000 m/96 rifles were manufactured by Husqvarna Vapenfabriks AB during World War II for civilian marksmanship training.

Mauser produced 40,000 m/1896 long rifles between 1899 and 1900, Carl Gustafs stads gevärsfaktori 475,000 m/1896 between 1896 and 1932 and Husqvarna Vapenfabriks AB 20,000 m/1896 between 1942 and 1944. Giving a total of 535,000 m/96 long rifles.

The m/96 rifle used a triangular front sight post and a rear tangent sight with a V-shaped notch. When folded down the rear sight is graduated from 300 to 600 m (328 to 656 yd), in 100 m (109 yd) increments. When flipped up the rear sight is graduated from 700 to 2,000 m (766 to 2,187 yd). The iron sights line was matched for the trajectory of 6.5×55mm m/94 ball service ammunition loaded with a round-nosed (B-projectile) bullet. A rifleman never used the flipped up position on his own - it was only used for simultaneous fire at ranks of enemies.

From 1941 onwards the introduction of 6.5×55mm m/94 ball ammunition loaded with a boat-tailed spitzer(D-projectile) bullet necessitated adapting the iron sight lines with a new m/41 rectangular post and the rear sight element was altered to have a U-shaped notch and match the flatter trajectory of the new service round.

== m/1938 Short Rifle ==
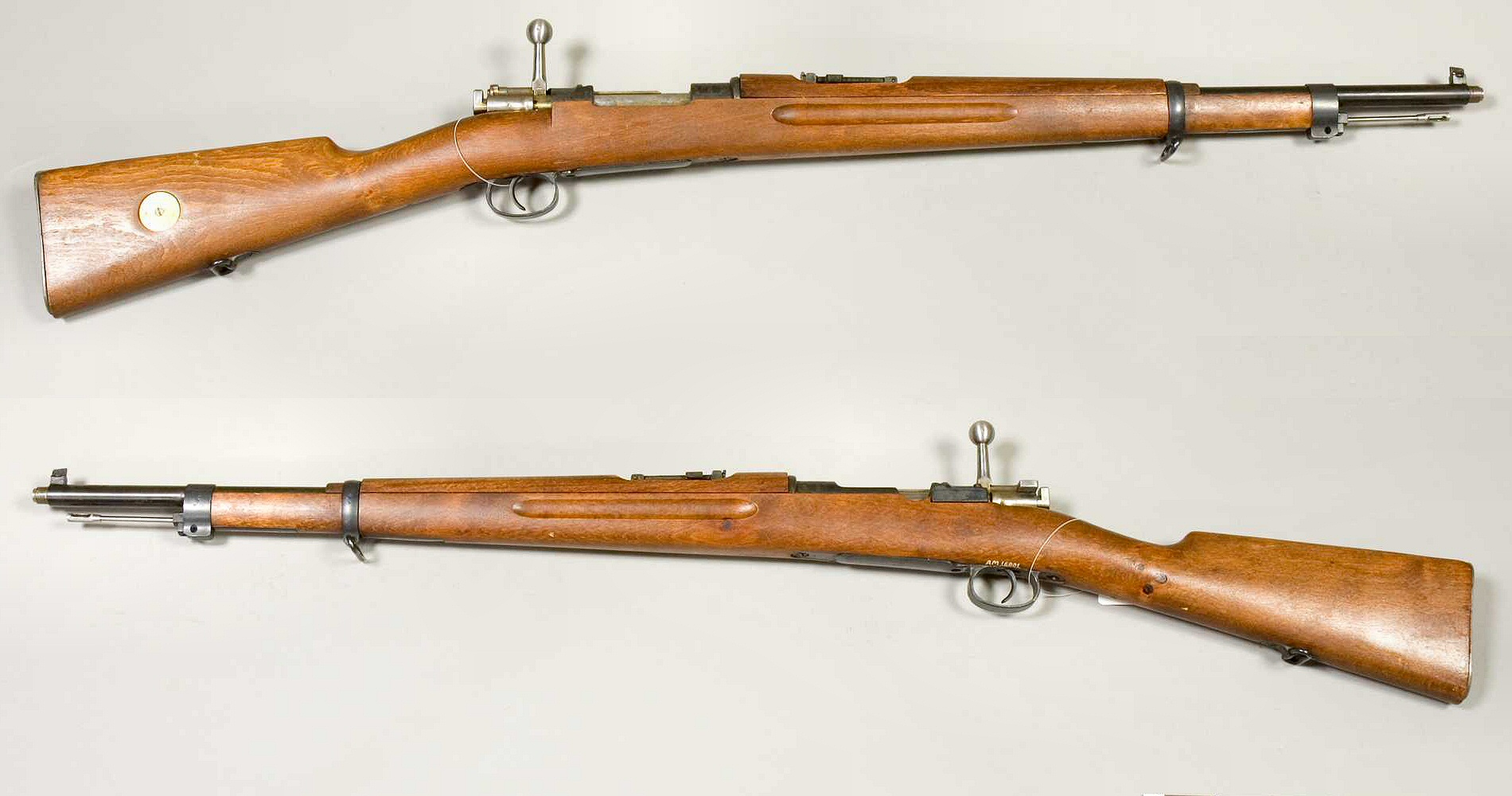
6,5 mm Gevär m/1938. Shortened rifle m/1896, rebuilt in 1938–1940.

The Model 1938 rifle (6,5 mm Gevär m/38) was adopted in 1938 as part of a worldwide trend (which began just before World War I) towards service rifles that were shorter in overall length than a standard infantry rifle, but longer than a cavalry carbine. Contemporary examples such as the Mauser Karabiner 98k, Short Magazine Lee–Enfield No I Mk III, MAS-36, and M1903 Springfield were all noticeably shorter than a standard late 19th century infantry rifle, and with another war on the horizon the Swedes felt it would be expedient to adopt a shorter rifle for use by mechanized troops and the Navy.

The original m/1938 rifles (Type I) were converted m/1896 rifles with barrels cut down by 139 mm (5.5 in) and almost always with the original straight bolt handles. These rifles are often referred to by collectors as "m/96-38" rifles, but there was never an official designation for this conversion. The majority of purpose-built m/1938s (Type II) had turned-down bolt handles and were manufactured by Husqvarna Vapenfabriks AB, with production ending in 1944. However, the Swedish military made no distinction in service between the two types.

Carl Gustafs stads gevärsfaktori converted 55,080 m/1896 long rifles to m/1938 short rifles in 1938–1940. In addition to that Husqvarna Vapenfabriks AB produced 88,150 new m/38 short rifles between 1942 and 1944. Giving a total of 143,230 m/1938 short rifles.

Both subtypes of the family got a new simpler and shorter-range rear sight update designed by P. O. Fäldt of Svenska Metallverken in 1936, which used a horizontal disk with ranges rotating a vertical screw in order to elevate the original tangent leaf (like a micrometer). The rear sighting element of iron sight lines of the short rifles converted from old m/96 rifles were adjustable for ranges from 250 to 600 m (273 to 656 yd) calibrated for 6.5×55mm m/94 round-nosed (B-projectile) ammunition. The rear sights of new production m/38 short rifles were adjustable for ranges from 100 to 600 m (109 to 656 yd) calibrated for 6.5×55mm m/94 round-nosed ammunition or alternatively 150 to 600 m (164 to 656 yd) calibrated for 6.5×55mm m/41 (B-projectile) boat-tailed spitzer ammunition and are now known as SM-sikte after the producer markings. Both sighting types were adjustable in 50 m (55 yd) increments

== m/1941 and m/1941B Sniper Rifles ==
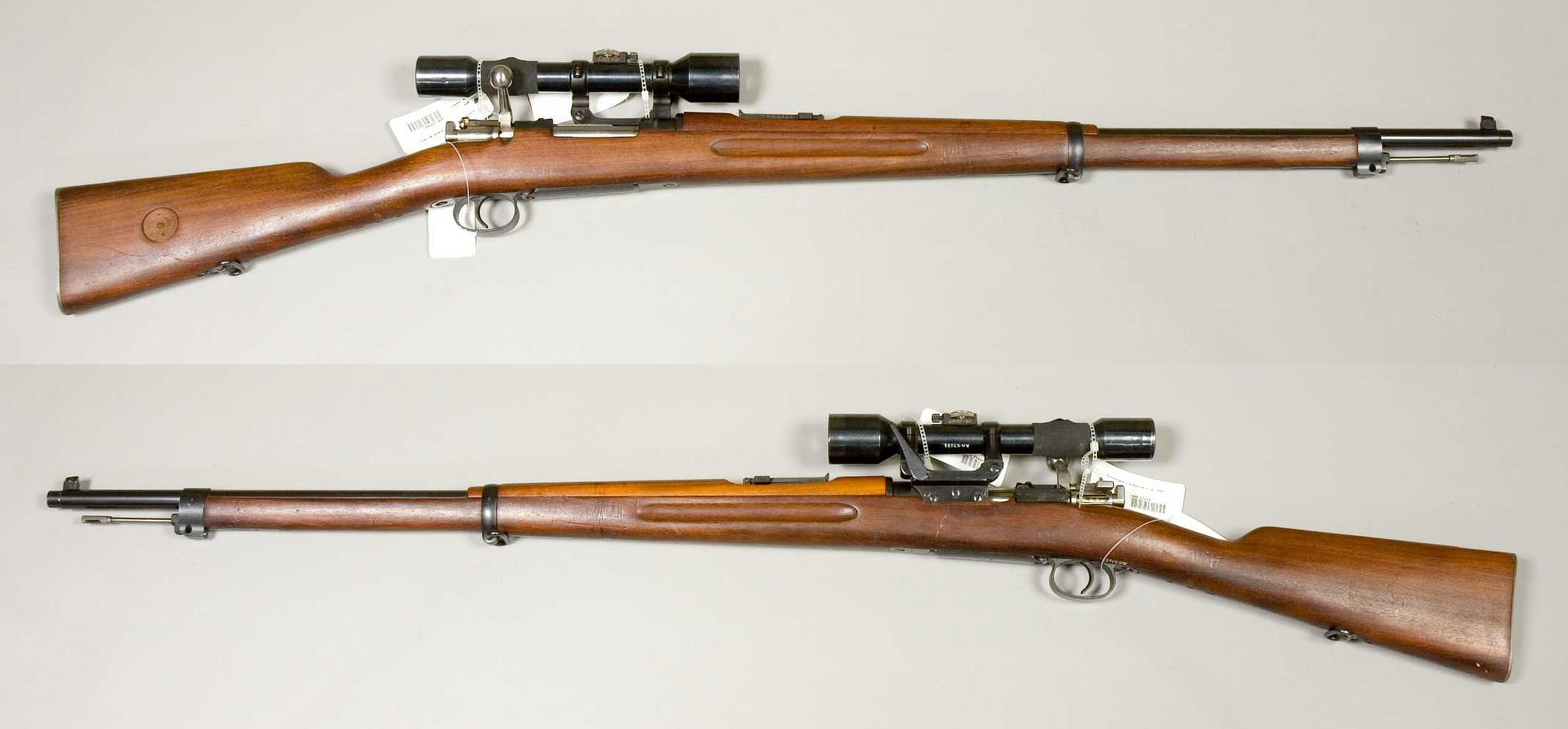
6,5 mm Gevär m/1941 sniper rifle.

The m/1941 sniper rifles were m/1896 rifles of all three manufacturers, in 1941–1943 selected from the existing stock for accuracy and converted by Carl Gustafs stads gevärsfaktori into sniper rifles. This modification of some 5,300 rifles included the bolt handle turned-down in order to provide clearance for unimpaired operation of the bolt handle and three-position safety catch lever with a telescopic sight mounted. The optics fitted were initially the German AJACK 4×90 (4×38 in modern terminology) m/41 telescopic sight. "AJACK" refers to the German optics manufacturer Adolph Jackenroll Optische Anstalt GmbH. The AJACK 4×90 had bullet drop compensation in 50 m (55 yd) increments for ranges from 100 to 800 m (109 to 875 yd). However, because of the deteriorating war situation Germany stopped selling telescopic sights to Sweden after 4,000 units were delivered, resulting in 1,300 domestically produced AGA 3× m/42 and 3× m/44 telescopic sights (made by Svenska Ackumulatorfabriken Jungner) being used instead.

After World War 2, in 1955, the weapons were refurbished to the m/1941B standard. This included a stop screw on the mounting rail for the mounting arrestment lever, preventing it from being overtightened, the serial number on the receiver that the mount covered was now repeated on the mount and the fastening screws got peened into the holes of the now removed locking screws. The tangent-type rear sight element was replaced by a micrometer SM-sight. All the m/42 telescopic sights (which had a problem with the sealing and thus could fog up) and most of the m/44 telescopic sights were replaced with AJACK 4×90 telescopic sights, which a decade after World War II were available in sufficient numbers.

== Model 1896 Swedish Mauser in Finnish service during WW II ==
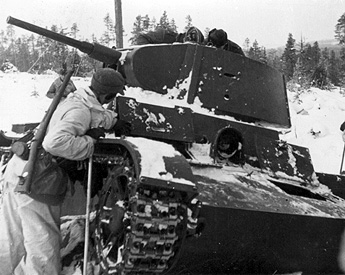
Swedish volunteers by a destroyed Soviet tank in Finland during the Winter War. The soldier in the foreground carries a slung m/94 carbine.

In 1940, Finland bought 77,000 M1896 Mausers from Sweden in 6.5×55mm. They were mainly used by second line units. Model 1896 rifles used by Finland in WWII can be recognized by a stamp with the letters SA (Suomen Armeija = Finnish Army) surrounded by a square with rounded corners. Most of the rifles were returned to Sweden after WWII but some remained in Finland.

== End of service ==
The m/1894 carbine and the m/1896 and m/1938 rifles were gradually phased out of Swedish service starting in the 1950s, although the sniper variants continued in service until the early 1980s. They were succeeded by the Ag m/42 semi-automatic rifle beginning in the late 1940s, followed by the Ak 4 battle rifle starting in the 1960s. However, some rear echelon logistic units were still equipped with m/1896 as late as 1983. The last unit to use m/1941(B) sniper rifles were the Hemvärnet (Home Guard) that replaced their m/1941(B) sniper rifles in 1995 by Ak 4OR rifles with Hensoldt 4×24 telescopic sights. The m/1894 carbine is still used for ceremonial and guard purposes by the Royal Guards.

== Civilian use ==
Both the m/1896 and m/1938 rifles are highly sought after by military rifle shooters and hunters. The 6.5×55mm is an ideal all-round hunting rifle cartridge, as it has a flat trajectory, low recoil, and high accuracy. Many rifles in Australia, New Zealand, Canada, the United Kingdom, the United States and South Africa have been sporterized to make deer (or similar game) hunting rifles, and many firearms manufacturers, including SAKO, Ruger and Winchester, produce new hunting rifles chambered in this cartridge.

== Civilian rifles built on the Swedish Mauser action ==
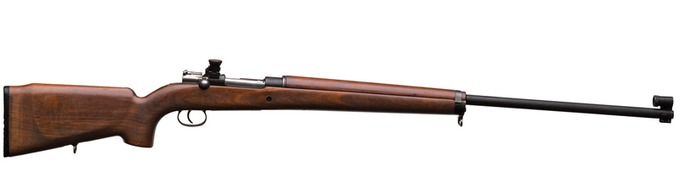
CG 63 competition/target rifle

When surplus Swedish Mausers became available after World War II many m/1896 and m/1938 rifles were successfully converted by Carl Gustafs and Norma into the CG 63 Competition/Target Rifle chambered in 6.5×55mm and 7.62×51mm NATO. A number of CG 63 match rifles were acquired by the Swedish Army, with their rifles colloquially known as Gevär 6 if in 6.5×55mm and Gevär 7 if in 7.62×51mm. These competition/target rifles were used by members of the Swedish Volunteer Sharpshooting Movement Frivilliga Skytterörelsen (FSR) and are known to be very accurate for their price. The FSR strived to keep the costs of participating in their shooting events reasonable, so the FSR rulings restricted the unchecked use of very expensive highly specialized target rifles, ammunition and other gear. The CG 63 rifle was built on a Swedish Mauser receiver, to which a new heavy, non-stepped free-floating target barrel was fitted. The vertical thumb piece was removed from the bolt to improve lock time. The triggers were adjusted and smoothed to match quality and the rifles got diopter and globe sighting lines (from several Swedish manufacturers) and target stocks. The CG 63 was further developed into the CG 73 / CG 74, also called m/74, and finally the CG 80 competition/target rifle. The CG competition/target rifles complied and evolved with the technical and dimensional FSR rulings then imposed for FSR shooting events. Starting at the end of the 20th century the FSR allowed the use of competition/target rifles that are not based on the Swedish Mauser receiver.

Husqvarna also made commercial m/1894 and m/1896 versions available as sporting rifles called Model 46 and its variants (Models 46A, 46AN and 46B) in 6.5×55mm, 9.3×57mm and 9.3×62mm. After World War II they used m/96 and m/38 actions without thumb notch to create the Model 640 series (646 in 6.5×55mm, 648 in 8×57mm, 649 in 9.3×62mm). These are not to be confused with the late-production Model 640 using FN Herstal M98 actions. Stiga also made sporterized versions in popular calibers, which are very well finished and balanced.

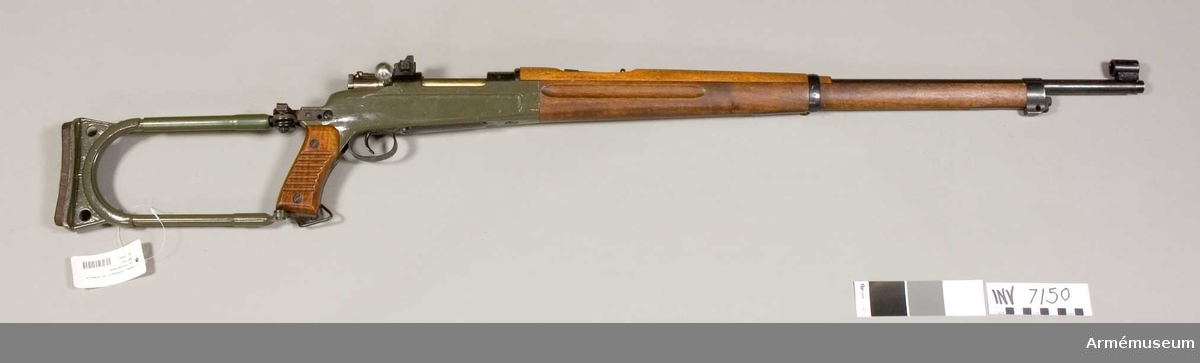
Mauser m/1896 biathlon rifle chambered in 6.5×55mm.

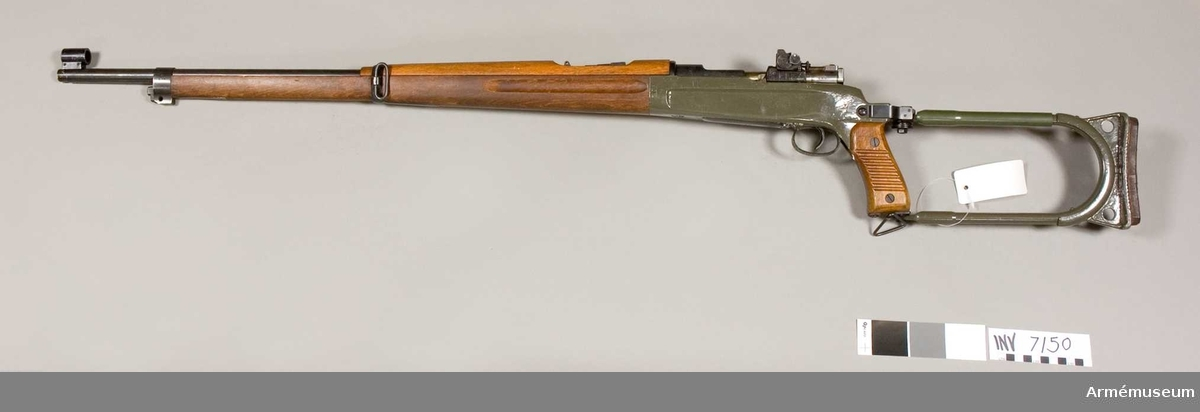

== Users ==
- Sweden
- Finland
- Luxembourg
- Denmark
- Norway
- Iceland
- Thailand

== Gallery ==
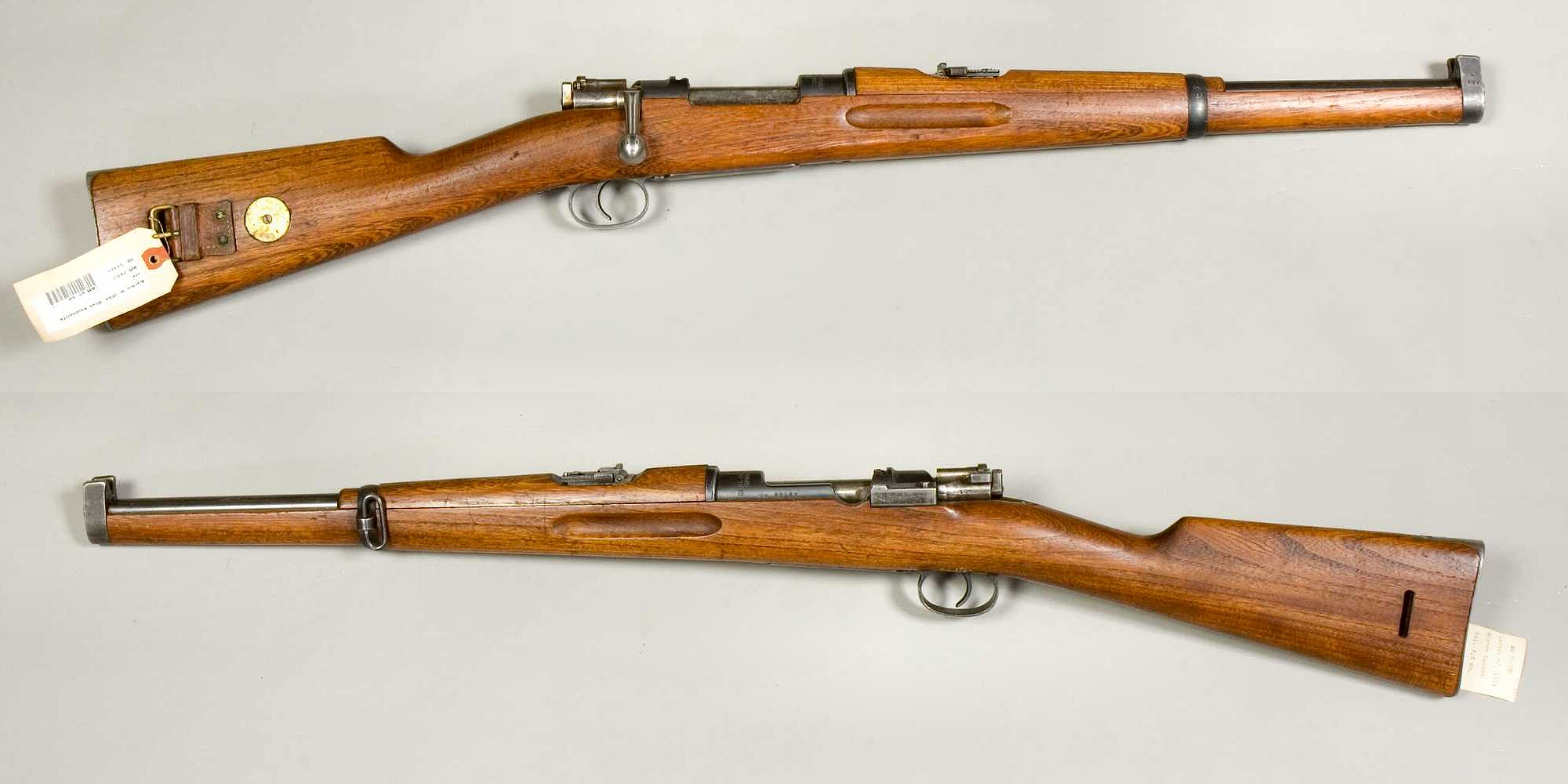
Karbin m/1894, original model without bayonet mount

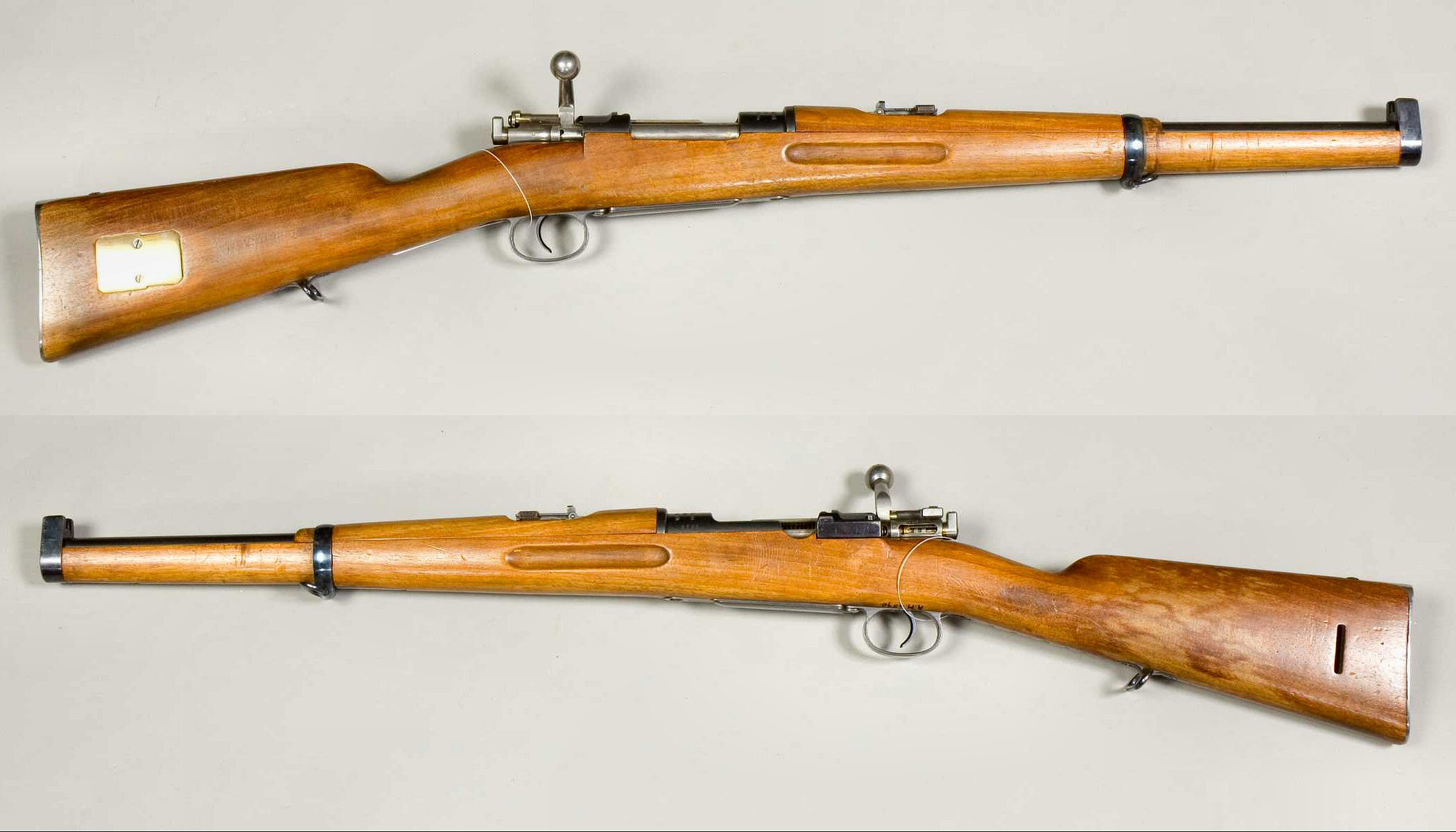
Karbin m/1894-96 for the Corps of Engineers (no bayonet mount, rifle sling swivels)

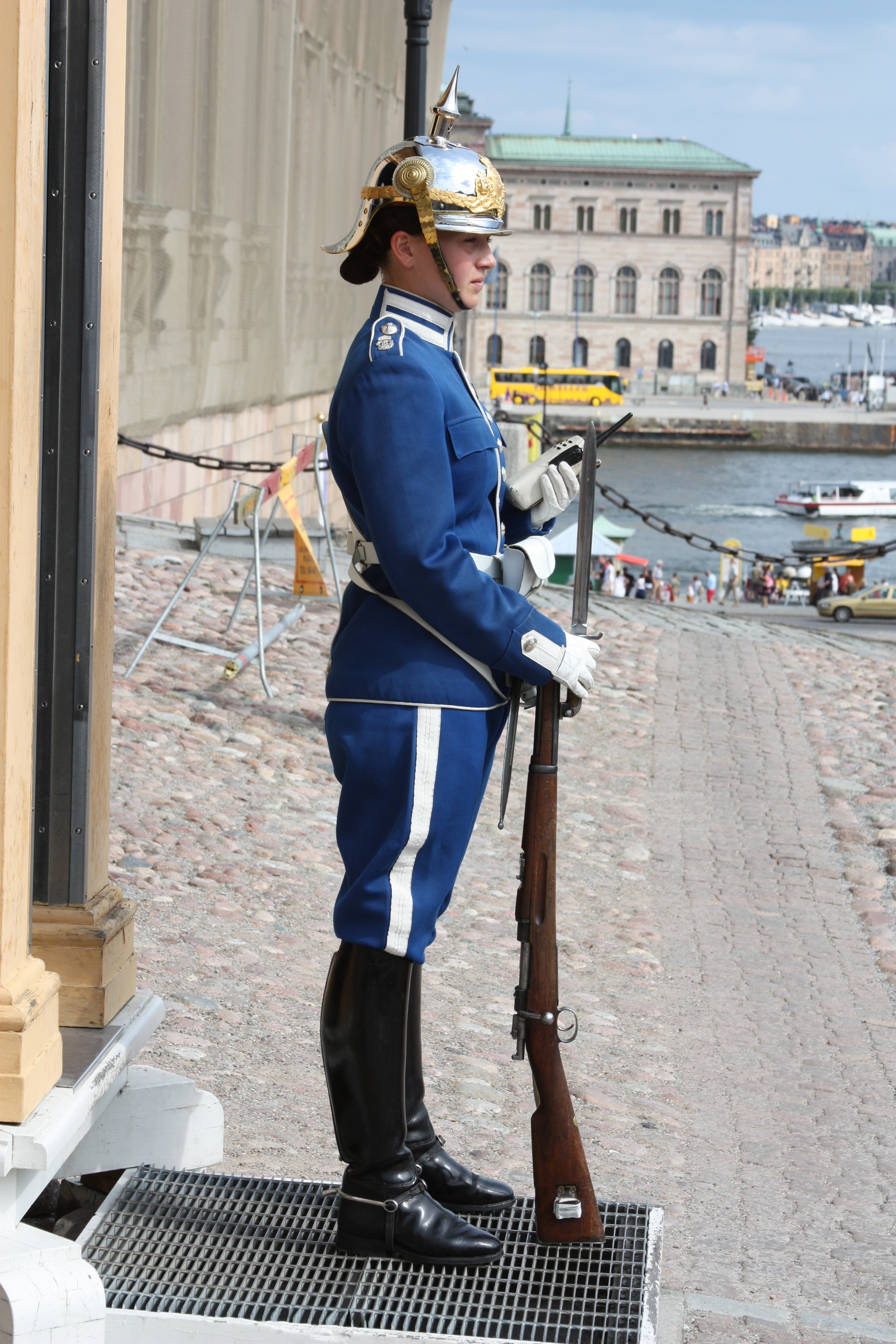
Karbin m/1894 in (ceremonial) use by the Royal Guards in 2009.

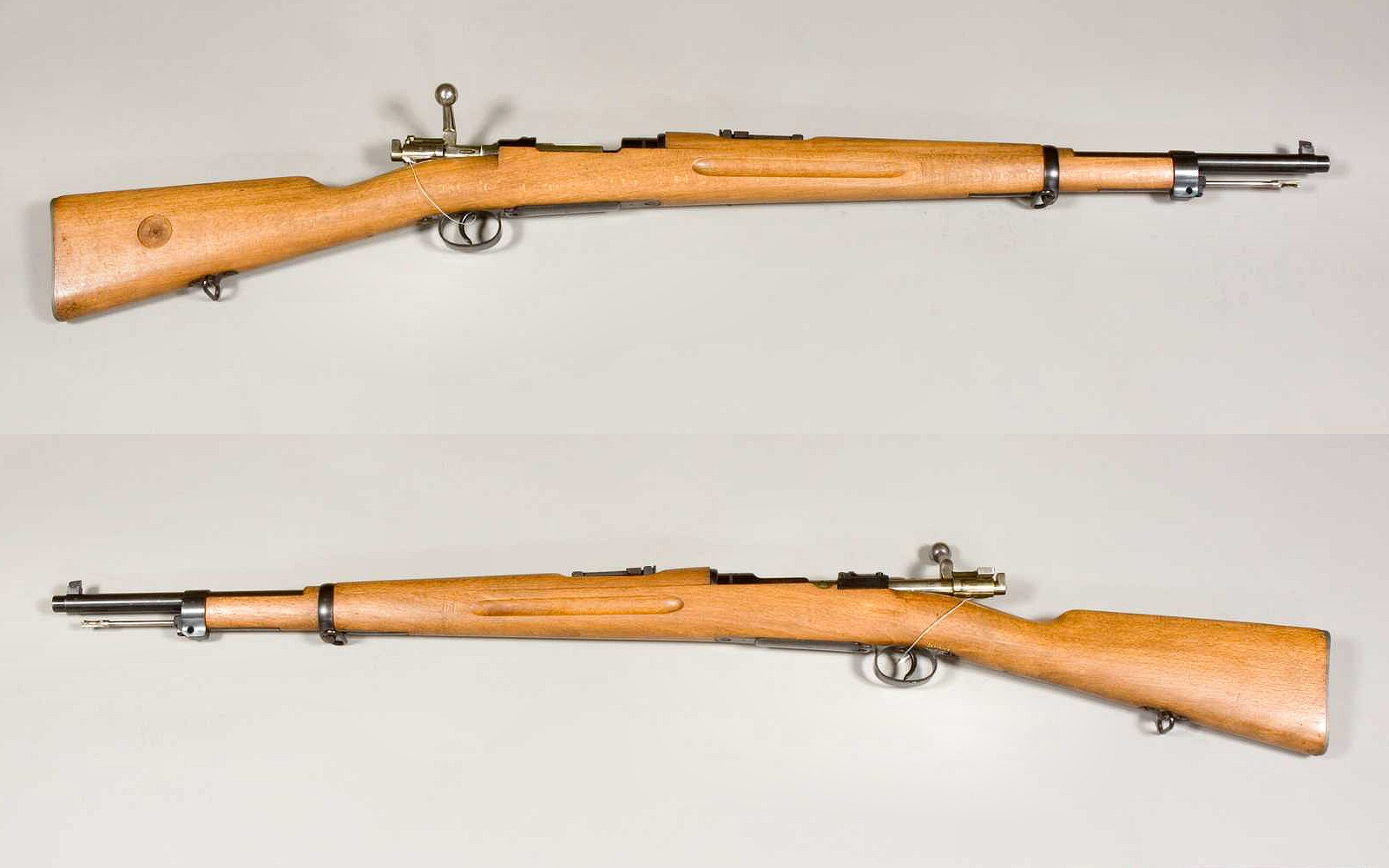
Gevär m/1938 purpose-built m/1938 (Type II) equipped with a turned-down bolt handle

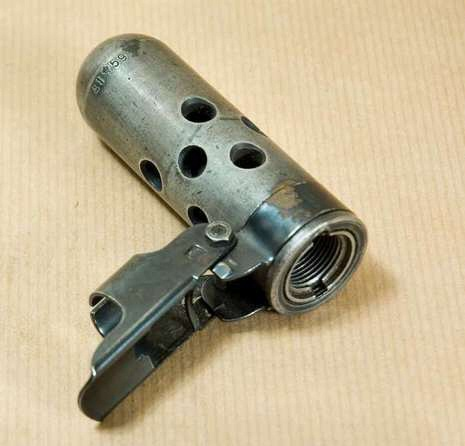
Blank Firing Attachment (BFA) for Swedish Mauser m/1896B and m/1938B

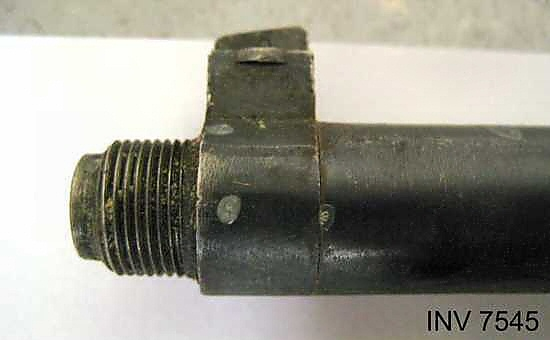
Muzzle threads for blank firing adapter

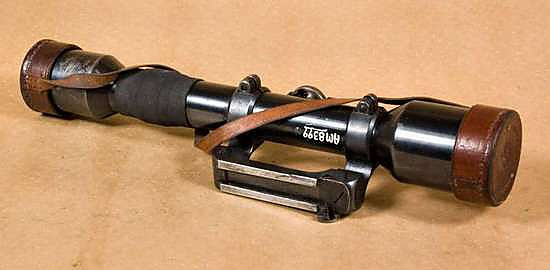
Rifle scope m/1941 (ZF Ajack 4×90) for m/1941 sniper rifle

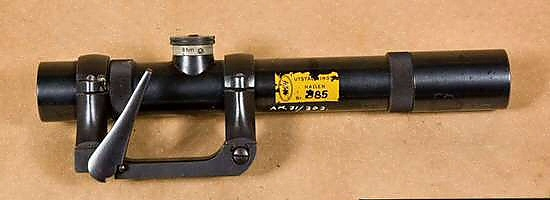
Rifle scope m/1944 (AGA 3×65) for m/1941 sniper rifle

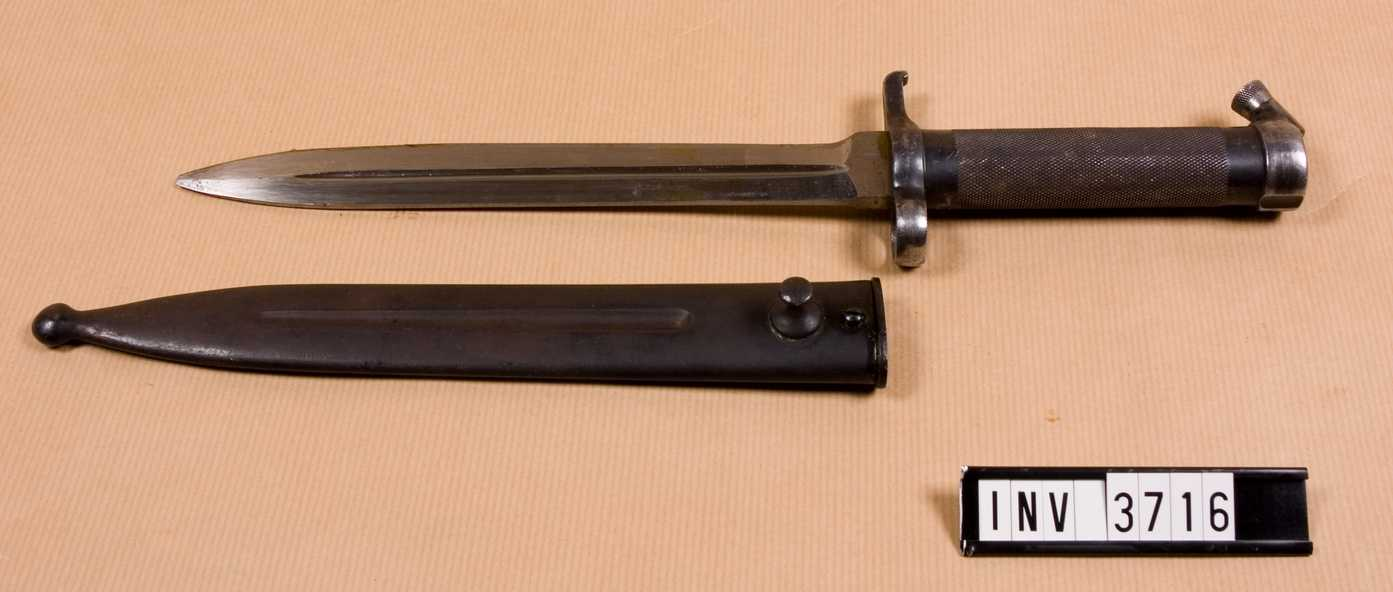
Knife bayonet m/1896 for m/1896 and m/1938 rifles (overall length 330 mm/13 in)

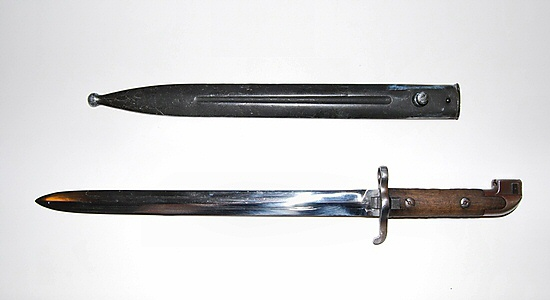
Knife bayonet m/1914 for m/1894-14 carbine (overall length 460 mm/18.1 in)

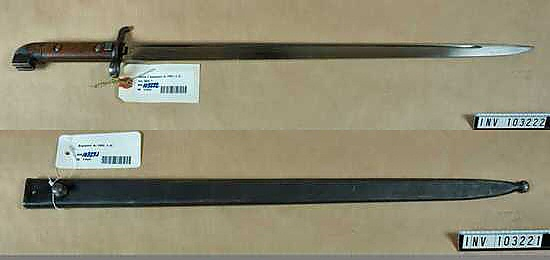
Knife bayonet m/1915 for m/1894-14 carbine, Royal Swedish Navy (overall length 635 mm/25 in)

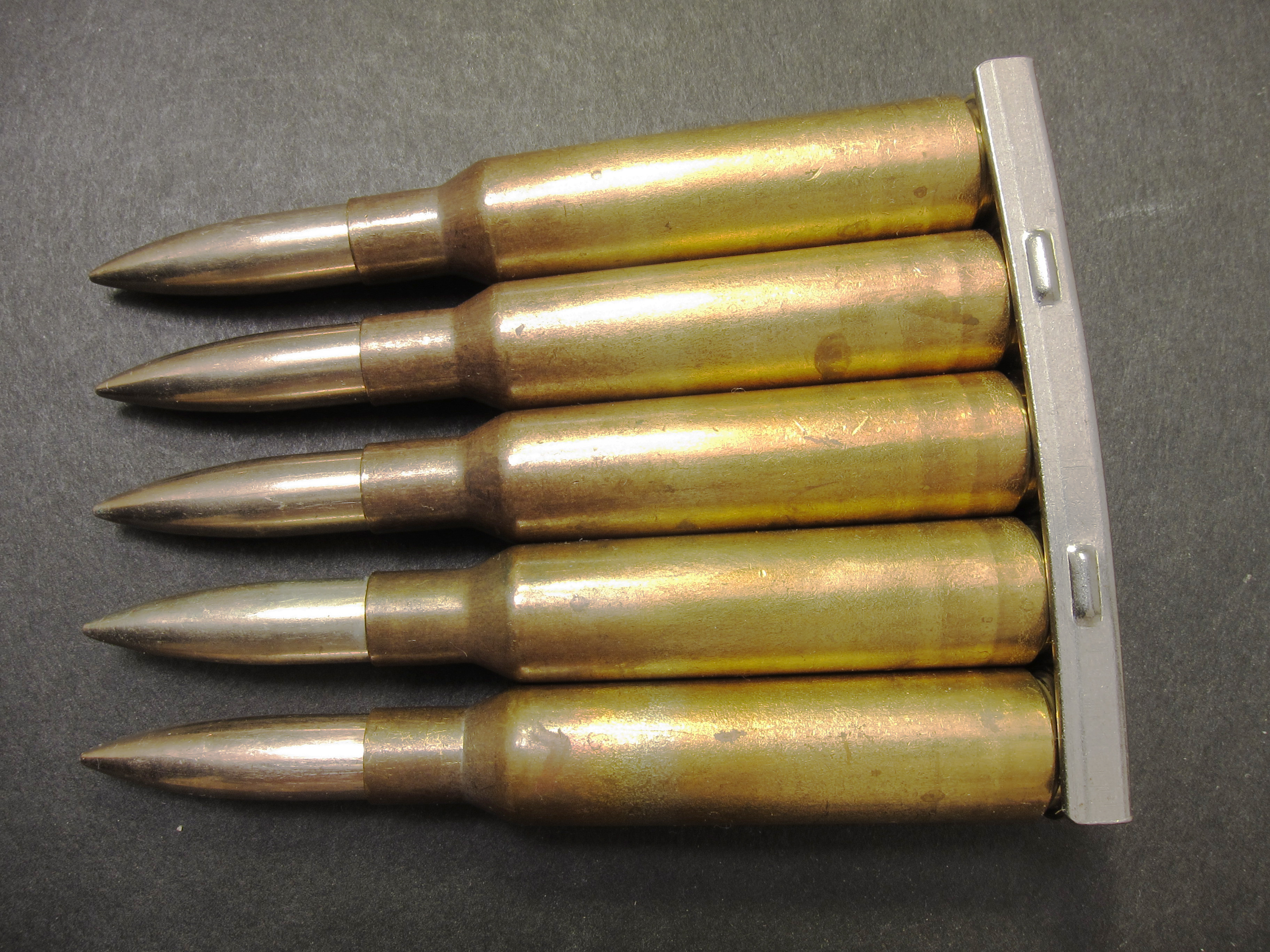
Stripper clip loaded with Swedish 6.5×55mm surplus FMJ spitzer ammunition produced in 1976.
