= Johannes Beilharz =

German poet, painter and translator

Johannes Beilharz (born 15 January 1956) is a German poet, painter and translator.

Beilharz was born in Oberndorf am Neckar, Baden-Württemberg, attended local schools, studied English, French, Spanish and Catalan at the University of Regensburg from 1975 to 1977, then continued his studies at the University of Colorado in 1977, graduating with an M.A. in English Literature/Creative Writing in 1981. He has worked mainly in translation and has traveled widely, primarily in the United States, Mexico, Europe and Asia. He has lived in Boulder, Colorado and Salida, Colorado, Stuttgart, Germany and currently lives in Pliezhausen, Germany and Rome, Italy.

Johannes Beilharz writes in German as well as English and has published poetry, fiction and poetry translations from several languages in numerous print and online magazines since 1978. A volume of his short stories (Die gottlosen Ameisen) was published in 2003.

He has had solo art exhibitions and participated in group exhibitions in France, Germany, India and Italy since 2002 and appeared in public readings, partially with jazz and Indian musicians, in Germany since 2003.

Poets he has translated include Gabriel Ferrater, Barbara Guest, John Ashbery, Kenneth Koch, Harry Mathews, Edward Dorn, John Tranter, Kabir, Rabindranath Tagore, Friedrich Hölderlin, Hugo von Hofmannsthal, Ingeborg Bachmann and Erwin Einzinger.

== Publications ==
- Rural Ditties (English; self-published, 1980)
- Minima Amoralia (German; self-published, 1981)
- Die gottlosen Ameisen (German; Alkyon Verlag, 2003)
- Best of Meme (English; Wordclay, Bloomington, Indiana, USA 2008, ISBN 978-1-60481-364-7)
- 101 (English; epubli, Berlin, Germany 2014, ISBN 978-3844290943)
- Eine finnische Jazznummer für die Missverstandenen (German; epubli, Berlin, Germany 2014, ISBN 978-3-8442-9018-9)

== See also ==
- List of German painters
