= Wilhelm Mauser =

German weapon designer (1834–1882)

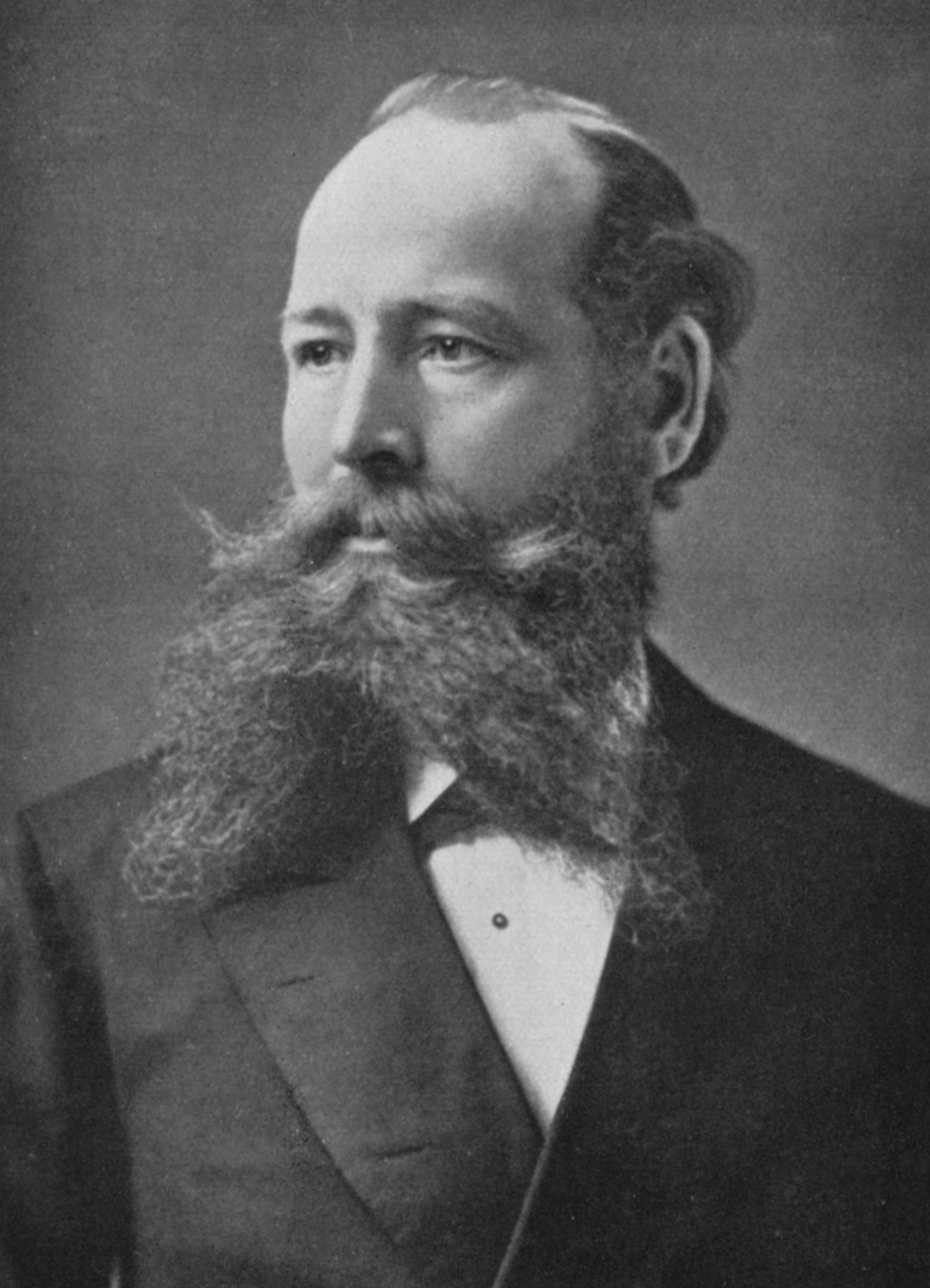
- Born: 2 May 1834; Oberndorf am Neckar, Kingdom of Württemberg
- Died: 13 January 1882 (aged 47); Oberndorf am Neckar, Kingdom of Württemberg, German Empire
- Occupation: Weapon designer
- Known for: Designer of the Mauser rifle
- Relatives: Paul Mauser, brother

Wilhelm Mauser (2 May 1834 – 13 January 1882) was a German weapon designer and manufacturer/industrialist.

== Biography ==
Mauser was born in Oberndorf am Neckar, in what was then the Kingdom of Württemberg. His father and his four brothers were gunsmiths.

Together with his brother Paul Mauser (1838–1914) Wilhelm Mauser designed the Mauser Model 1871 rifle, the first of a successful line of Mauser rifles and pistols. The rifle was adopted as the Gewehr 71 or Infanterie-Gewehr 71 and was the first metal cartridge weapon of the German Empire. While Paul was the more technical of the two, Wilhelm handled the business side of the factory.

The Mauser company later developed the Gewehr 98 and Karabiner 98k rifle series. The Gewehr 98 itself is often considered the penultimate development of the line of Mauser rifles that were introduced in 1871.
