= Matt Schrier =

American former photographer

Matthew B. Schrier is an American former photographer who escaped from al Qaeda.

== Early life and career ==
Schrier is from Deer Park, New York, and attended Hofstra University, where he was an English major who also studied film production. He entered Syria with the help of the Free Syrian Army. Schrier captured images of FSA rebels fighting forces of the Syrian president Bashar al-Assad.

== Abduction by the al-Nusra Front ==
In late December 2012, Schrier was captured by Jabhat al-Nusra, the Al-Qaeda affiliate in Syria, while traveling on the road between Aleppo and the Turkish border. A Jeep Cherokee cut across from the side of the road and three men jumped out. Schrier told 60 Minutes, "One of 'em was cloaked completely in black, you know, like the guys in the movies -- scarf around his face, AK-47 in his hand, and he took me out, put me in the back seat of the Cherokee and he put the barrel of the gun to the side of my head." While a rookie photographer himself, he was among a collection of kidnapped American journalists held by Syrian jihadis. He was eventually held in a series of rebel-controlled prisons in the Syrian city of Aleppo.

He strategically converted to Islam in March 2013 as a survival tactic to get better treatment, a tactic that ended up working.

== Escape ==
In July 2013 Schrier became the first Westerner to ever successfully escape from al Qaeda. Before sunrise, his cellmate Peter Theo Curtis lifted Schrier through the window, enabling Schrier to escape. Now outside of the prison, Schrier then decided his best chance of survival was to leave Curtis behind and escape alone. The men have given conflicting accounts of the escape attempt. Schrier claims that Curtis became stuck in a window and so he left him behind. Curtis claims this is a lie. He has said that Schrier failed to help him adequately and abandoned him, and he has said that he told Schrier to go for help.

== Aftermath ==
His book The Dawn Prayer (Or How to Survive in a Secret Syrian Terrorist Prison): A Memoir (ISBN 1944648887) was published on April 3, 2018.

In 2018 Shrier was featured on the National Geographic television show Locked Up Abroad in the episode 'Escape from Al Qaeda'. Curtis was not featured.

In January 2020, Schrier filed a lawsuit against Qatar Islamic Bank (QIB), as he claimed that they provide sponsorship for al-Qaeda.

== See also ==
- 2014 American Intervention in Syria
- Foreign hostages in Iraq
- Kenneth Bigley
- Nick Berg
- James Foley (journalist)
- Daniel Pearl
- Steven Sotloff
- Austin Tice
