= Oberndorf am Neckar =

- Town
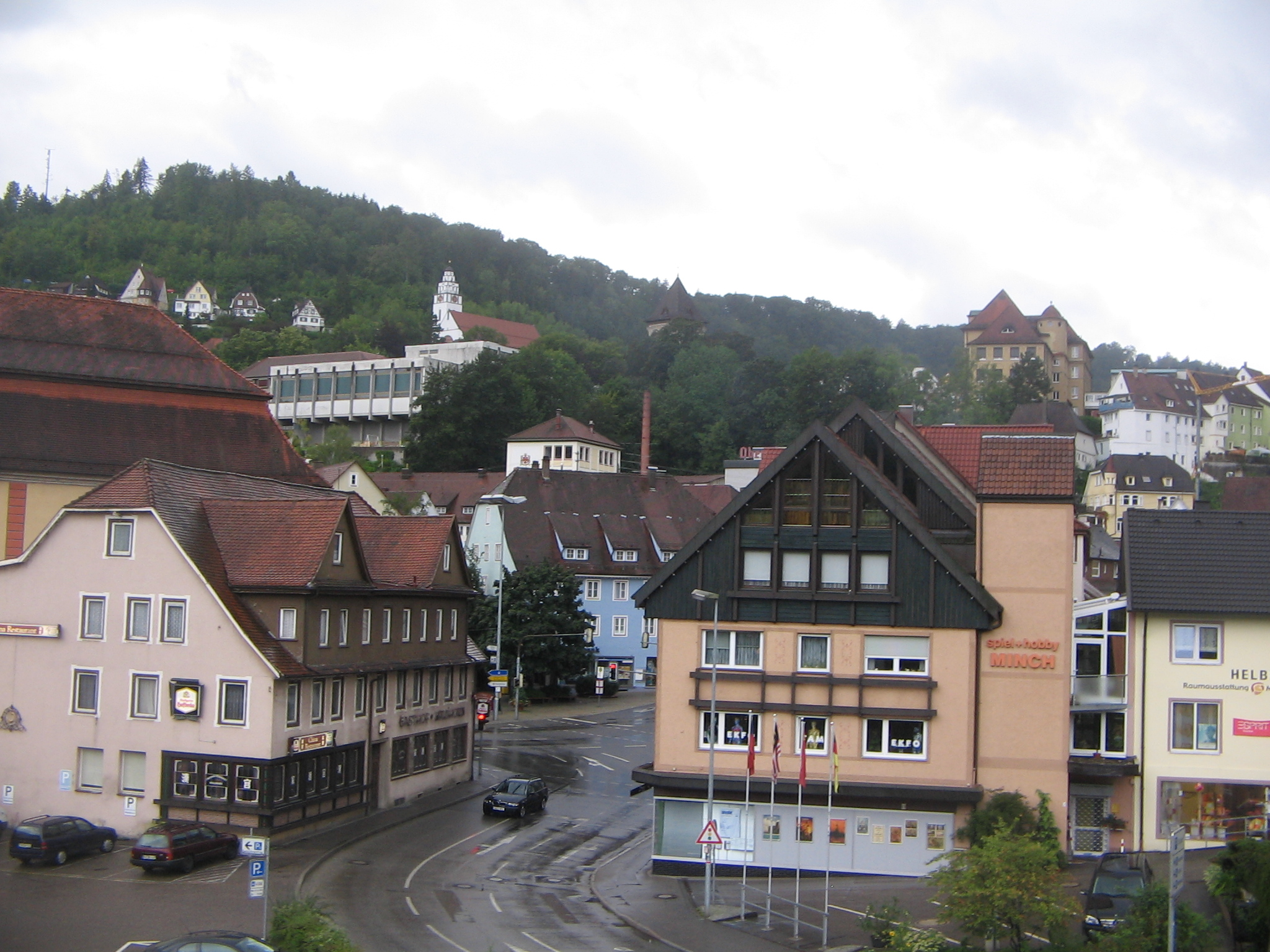
- View of the town

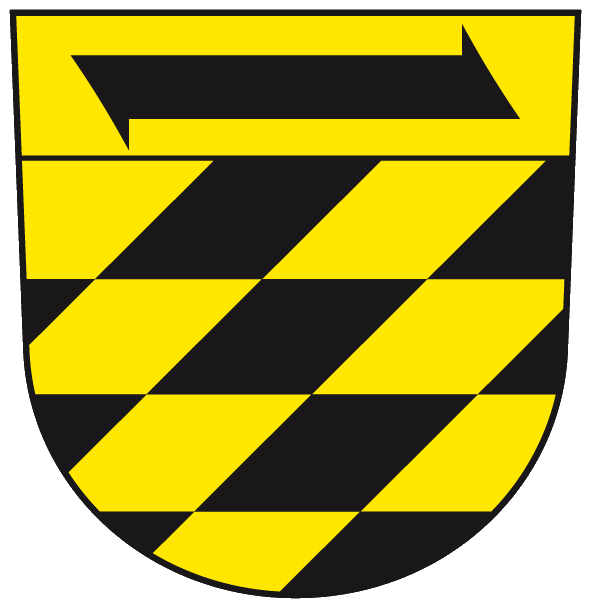
- Coat of arms

- Location of Oberndorf am Neckar within Rottweil district
- Interactive map of Oberndorf am Neckar
- Location within Germany Location within Baden-Württemberg
- Coordinates: 48°17′29″N 08°34′21″E
- Country: Germany
- State: Baden-Württemberg
- Admin. region: Freiburg
- District: Rottweil
- Subdivisions: 7 Stadtteile

Government
  - Mayor (2023–31): Matthias Winter

Area
  - Total: 55.92 km^{2} (21.59 sq mi)
- Elevation: 506 m (1,660 ft)

Population (2025-12-31)
  - Total: 14,711
  - Density: 263.1/km^{2} (681.4/sq mi)
- Time zone: UTC+01:00 (CET)
  - Summer (DST): UTC+02:00 (CEST)
- Postal codes: 78727
- Dialling codes: 07423
- Vehicle registration: RW
- Website: www.oberndorf.de

Oberndorf am Neckar (German pronunciation: [ˈoːbɐndɔʁf ʔam ˈnɛkaʁ], lit. 'Oberndorf on the Neckar'; Swabian: Oberndorf am Näggô) is a town in the district of Rottweil, in Baden-Württemberg, Germany. It is situated on the river Neckar, 15 kilometres (9 miles) north of Rottweil. It historically was and currently is a major center of the German weapons industry.

== Geography ==
Oberndorf lies in the Neckar Valley, which is between the Black Forest and the Swabian Jura. The Autobahn A 81 is nearby, with the Oberndorf exit about halfway between Stuttgart and Konstanz. The train line Stuttgart-Zürich-Milan goes directly through Oberndorf as well.

== Neighborhoods ==
The city of Oberndorf am Neckar is made up of the city proper and the surrounding villages of Altoberndorf, Aistaig, Boll, Bochingen, Beffendorf and Hochmössingen. The formerly independent surrounding villages were put under the administration of Oberndorf during the village and township reforms of Baden-Württemberg in the early 1970s.

== Culture and sightseeing ==
Aside from the Black Forest and German countryside, Oberndorf offers much to see. It is well known for its annual Karneval celebrations, which remain very traditional. An old historical "freier Markt".

=== Museums ===
- Home and Weapons Museum (in German)

== Notable company headquarters ==
- Bippus
- Heckler & Koch
- Mafell
- Mauser
- Schwarzwälder Bote
- Feinwerkbau - Westinger & Altenburger

== Twin towns – sister cities ==
Oberndorf am Neckar is twinned with:

- Oberndorf bei Salzburg, Austria
- Thierville-sur-Meuse, France

== Notable people ==
- Wilhelm Mauser (1834–1882), businessman and firearms manufacturer
- Paul Mauser (1838–1914), businessman and firearms manufacturer
- Johannes Beilharz (born 1956), poet, painter and translator.
- Steffen Weigold (born 1979), cyclist
- Björn Grossmann (born 1984), racing driver
