= Theo Padnos =

American journalist

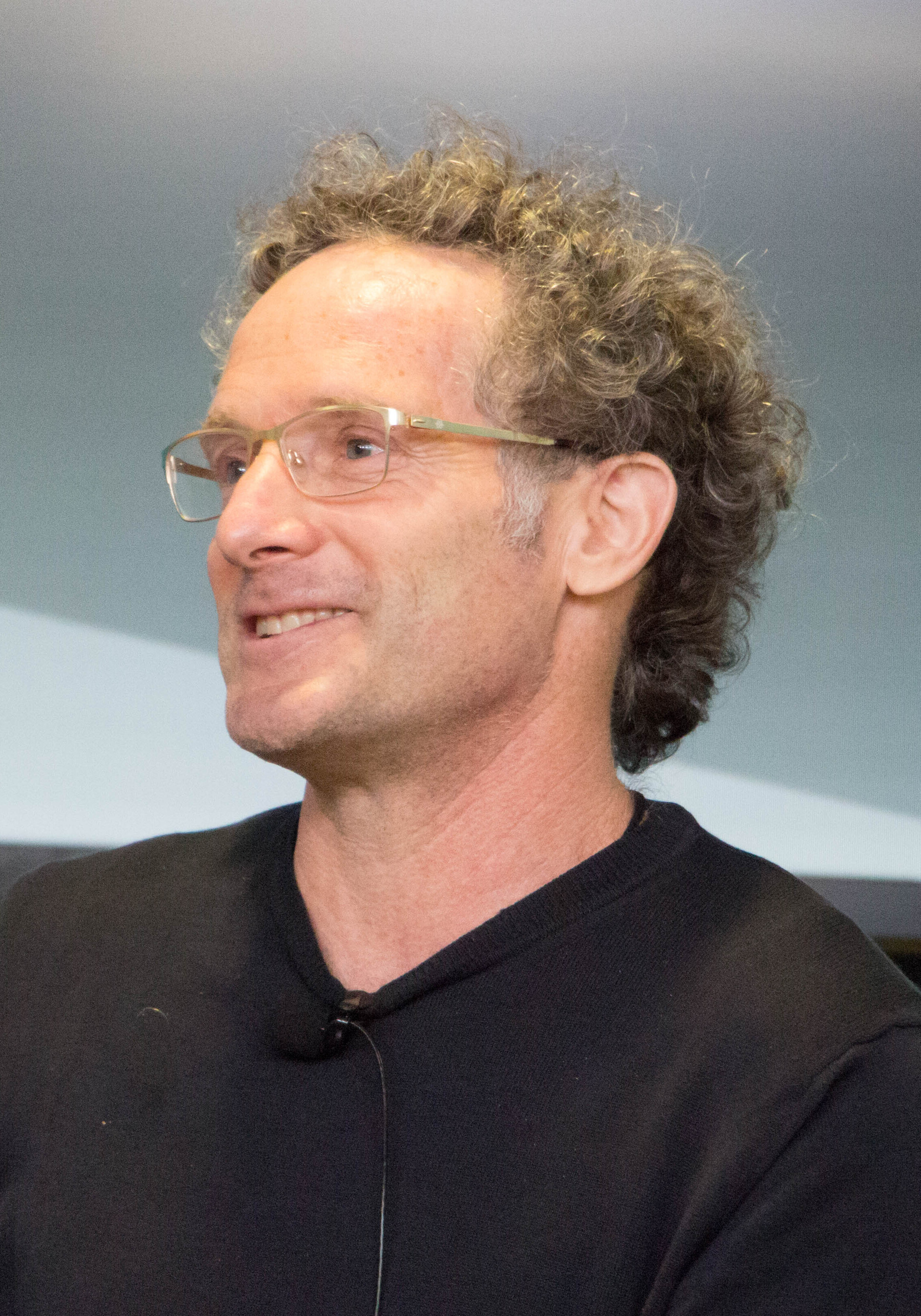
- Curtis in 2017
- Born: Peter Theophilus Eaton Padnos; 1968 (age 57–58); Atlanta, Georgia, United States
- Other names: Theo Padnos; Peter Curtis
- Education: Middlebury College; University of Massachusetts at Amherst
- Occupations: Journalist, writer, teacher
- Parent(s): Michael Padnos (father); Nancy Curtis (mother)

Theo Padnos (also known as Peter Theo Curtis; born 1968) is an American journalist who was released by the al-Nusra Front in August 2014, after being held hostage for almost two years. He was the cellmate of American war photographer Matt Schrier, who escaped after seven months of captivity.

== Early life and career ==
Peter Theophilus Eaton Padnos was born in Atlanta, Georgia, to Michael Padnos, a writer now living in Paris (then he worked as a lawyer), and Nancy Curtis. He received his bachelor's degree from Middlebury College in Vermont and his doctorate in comparative literature from the University of Massachusetts at Amherst. He is fluent in French, Arabic, German, and Russian.

He moved to Vermont and taught poetry to prisoners of a local jail. His first book, My Life Had Stood a Loaded Gun, was written about this experience. In this book he firstly shows his interest in writing about disaffected youth. He then relocated to Yemen, where he changed his legal name to Peter Theo Curtis, under which he continued writing.

Padnos began his study of Islam in Yemen at Dar al-Hadith, before moving to Damascus, Syria, to enroll in an Islamic religious school. His second book, Undercover Muslim, where he highlights the topic of Islamic extremism, was published in the UK. After its publication, the changing of his name (to Peter Theo Curtis) made travel in the Middle East easier. Since he had declared allegiance to Islam in public, the book could be interpreted as apostasy. In 2012, he became a freelance journalist. He created articles about the Middle East for magazines such as the New Republic, The Huffington Post and the London Review of Books.

He then moved to Antakya, Turkey, near the Syrian border. Although Padnos originally claimed in his NY Times article that he went to Syria to "stop into villages and interview people, telling the story of a nation with many identities, dissatisfied with them all, in trouble, wanting help," he later completely changed his story in his documentary, claiming he was there to "follow some refugees back into Syria and write about the adverse conditions in the camps." However, in his former cellmate's book, "The Dawn Prayer," Matthew Schrier claims Padnos told him he was in Syria to write a story about abducted American journalist Austin Tice, and provided documentation proving so in the form of an email Padnos wrote to Tice's editor shortly before he was kidnapped asking him to "commission" the article. According to Padnos, many story ideas were floating around in his head as he crossed over into Syria.

== Abduction and imprisonment ==
Padnos was held in a series of prisons run by Syrian rebel groups with ties to Al Qaeda. His family was asked to pay a ransom of an amount of money between $3 million and $25 million. According to his account of his captivity published in The New York Times Magazine on November 2, 2014, he was held by al-Nusra Front and later by Abu Mariya al-Qahtani, who also released him.

Padnos considers himself "most responsible" for his kidnapping, believing he was reckless in crossing into Syria with smugglers he did not know and who held him captive. Commenting on the torture and mistreatment he endured at first, he says,

It seemed to me that I had been walking calmly through an olive grove with Syrian friends, that a rent in the earth had opened, that I had fallen into the darkness and woken in a netherworld, the kind found in myths or nightmares.

Curtis was imprisoned with another American, the New York photographer Matthew Schrier. Both were tortured by Al Qaeda and Schrier, of Russian Jewish heritage, strategically converted to Islam as a survival tactic while Curtis remained a Christian. Toward the end of July 2013, Curtis and Schrier devised a way to crawl out of a small window in the cell. Padnos lifted Schrier through the window, enabling Schrier to escape. Now outside of the prison, Schrier decided his best chance of survival was to leave Padnos behind and escape alone. The men have given competing accounts of the escape attempt. Schrier claims that Padnos became stuck in a window and so he left him behind. Padnos has said that Schrier ran away without trying to help.

Padnos said that he escaped twice, each time seeking refuge with the Free Syrian Army, and that both times they delivered him back to the Al Nusra Front.

== Release ==
Relatives were not told the terms of Curtis's release, which came one week after James Foley's beheading by the Islamic State. A team led by editor David G. Bradley and the Padnos family contacted Ghanem Khalifa al-Kubaisi, head of Qatar State Security, who mediated for Curtis's release and according to what it told the Padnos family it was "on a humanitarian basis without the payment of money". The kidnappers had demanded ransom reaching 22 million euros. Curtis states that he was released to the UN mission in the Golan Heights.

A documentary about Padnos's time in captivity was released in 2016 titled Theo Who Lived.

In 2021 he released a book, Blindfold: A Memoir of Capture, Torture, and Enlightenment, detailing his captivity.

== See also ==
- 2014 American Intervention in Syria
- Foreign hostages in Iraq
- Hostage Working Group
- Kenneth Bigley
- Nick Berg
- Daniel Pearl
- Steven Sotloff
