= Paul Mauser =

German weapon designer and manufacturer (1838–1914)

Peter Paul von Mauser
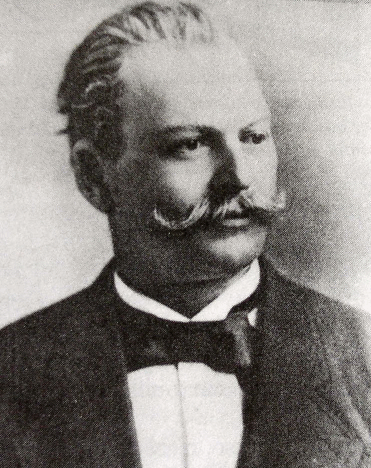
- Peter Paul von Mauser
- Born: June 27, 1838; Oberndorf am Neckar, Kingdom of Württemberg
- Died: May 29, 1914 (aged 75); Oberndorf am Neckar, Kingdom of Württemberg, German Empire
- Occupations: Engineer, Weapon Designer, Politician
- Known for: Development of distinctive Mauser action
- Notable work: Gewehr 98 rifle 7.65×53mm Mauser and 7×57mm Mauser rifle cartridges
- Political party: National Liberal Party
- Relatives: Wilhelm Mauser, brother

Peter Paul von Mauser (born Peter Paul Mauser) (27 June 1838 – 29 May 1914) was a German weapon designer, manufacturer, industrialist and politician.

== Early life ==
Mauser was born in Oberndorf am Neckar, in what was then the Kingdom of Württemberg. His father was originally a shoemaker and then made leather scabbards for the Royal Rifle Factory in Oberndorf.

== Career ==
Paul Mauser and his brother Wilhelm, who had become gunsmiths, first lived in modest conditions. Paul Mauser developed various firearms with his brother, and later he founded the company Gebr Mauser with him, which finally took over from the royal manufacture.

Together with his brother Wilhelm Mauser, Peter Paul Mauser designed the Mauser Model 1871 rifle, the first of a successful line of Mauser rifles and pistols. The rifle was adopted as the Gewehr 71 or Infanterie-Gewehr 71 and was the first metal cartridge weapon of the German Empire. While Wilhelm handled the business side of the factory, Paul proved to be the more technically capable engineer.

Peter Paul von Mauser made significant contributions to bolt action rifle design and successfully combined and improved various bolt action engineering concepts. The Mauser company bolt action development resulted in the Gewehr 98 and Karabiner 98k rifle series that were the latest in a line of Mauser bolt-action rifles that started with the Mauser Model 1889 and were adapted in 1889 and the 1890s as service rifles by several countries. The bolt-action design used for the Gewehr 98 was patented by Paul Mauser on 9 September 1895. Besides rifles, Paul Mauser also developed handguns, with the first Mauser designed handgun being the Mauser C78 revolver. In 1896, Paul Mauser would develop the C96 pistol, which was one of the first semi-automatic pistols in history.

Initially, Mauser's designs were more successful abroad than in Prussia, but the Prussian Rifle Review Board in Spandau opted for the domestically developed 1888 rifle. Mauser designed an improved model of this rifle for the Imperial Order.

The name of Mauser is linked to the construction of the 1893 infantry rifle for Spain, 1894 carbine and 1896 infantry rifle for Sweden, with model rifles for Peru, Belgium, Argentina, the Brazil (1894), Chile (1895), then Costa Rica, the Dominican Republic, El Salvador, Guatemala, Honduras, Nicaragua, Venezuela, Mexico (1902), Uruguay, and Turkey. Deliveries to these countries make the Mauser name known globally.

The construction of the Gewehr 98 rifle was personally praised by Kaiser Wilhelm II on April 5, 1898. Mauser lost his left eye in 1901 as a result of a cartridge explosion during a test firing of the self-loading C98.

Mauser also designed the 7.65×53mm Mauser (1889) and 7×57mm Mauser (1892) rifle cartridges. These cartridges were high-performance service cartridge designs compared to other contemporary smokeless powder service cartridges such as the 8mm Lebel (1886), 8×50mmR Mannlicher (1890) and .303 British (1891).

== Entry into politics ==
Mauser was a member of the German Reichstag for the National Liberal Party from 1898 to 1903, a party that appeared in the Kingdom of Württemberg as a German party. In the Reichstag, he represents the 8th district of Württemberg (Freudenstadt, Horb, Oberndorf, and Sulz). He was nominated as a candidate thanks to an alliance of the Conservatives, the Farmers' Federation, and the National Liberals and after his election to the Reichstag he joined the Group of National Liberals as a guest.

== Death ==
Peter Paul von Mauser died on 29 May 1914, two months before World War I started.

== Awards ==
- Grashof commemorative coin from the Association of German Engineers (1912)

== Designs ==
=== Rifles ===
- Mauser Model 1871
- Mauser Model 1889
- Mauser Model 1893
- Swedish Mauser
- Gewehr 98

=== Handguns ===
- Mauser C78 "Zig-Zag" (1878)
- Mauser C96 (1896)

=== Cartridges ===
- 7.65×53mm Mauser (1889)
- 7×57mm Mauser (1892)

== Literature ==
- Paul Gehring (1941), Wilhelm (1834–1882) und Paul Mauser (1838–1914): Erfinder und Fabrikanten von Gewehren und sonstigen Handfeuerwaffen. In: Hermann Haering und Otto Hohenstatt (Hrsg.), Schwäbische Lebensbilder, Bd. 2. Stuttgart: W. Kohlhammer, P. 314–339.
- Wolfgang Seel: Mauser, Paul von. In: Neue Deutsche Biographie (NDB). Band 16, Duncker & Humblot, Berlin 1990, ISBN 3-428-00197-4, P. 448 f.
