= A Pair of Silk Stockings =

- Short story by Kate Chopin
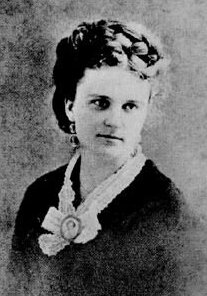
- Country: United States
- Language: English
- Genre: Short story

Publication
- Published in: Vogue
- Publication type: Magazine
- Publication date: September 1897

"A Pair of Silk Stockings" is an 1897 short story written by Kate Chopin. The story follows Mrs. Sommers who prefers spending a windfall on herself, rather than on her children.

== Plot summary ==
Mrs. Sommers comes into the small fortune of $15 (which has value of roughly $600 in 2025). After a few days of reflection, she decides to use the money to purchase clothing for her children so they may look "fresh and dainty and new for once in their lives." That narrative suggests that Mrs. Sommers had been before her marriage a wealthy woman, but now "needs of the present absorbed her every faculty."

An exhausted Mrs. Sommers rests at a counter where she will begin her shopping adventure. There she finds a pair of silk stockings for sale and is entranced by their smoothness. "Not thinking at all," she disregards her plans to obtain clothes for her children and instead spends her money and her afternoon for herself. She purchases boots to go with her stockings, buys fitted kid gloves, reads expensive magazines while lunching at a high-class restaurant, and ends her day sharing chocolates with a fellow theatre goer.

After the play ends, she boards the cable car to return home with "a poignant wish, a powerful longing that the cable car would never stop anywhere, but go on and on with her forever."

== Publication history ==
The story was first published in Vogue. Chopin chose to write for Vogue because the magazine was uncharacteristically "fearless and truthful" for the 1890s in its depiction of women and their lives. Scholar Emily Toth observes that many of Chopin's boldest stories were published in Vogue, including "The Story of an Hour". Vogue published these stories so earnestly that, Toth suggests, it gave Chopin the decidedly false impression that American reviewers would be accepting of her coming scandalous The Awakening.

== Analysis ==
Allen Stein argues that serpentine silk stockings represent the empty consumerism that Mrs. Sommers uses to try to escape her life. Chopin critic and biographer Barbara Ewell concurs, and calls the story "a small masterpiece." She posits that "the power of money to enhance self-esteem and confidence is the core" of the narrative. Describing Mrs. Sommers as "little", Chopin refers to more than her physical stature. The neighbors are all aware of what Mrs. Sommers' social standing had been before her marriage, and see how her marriage has reduced her. On the day of her shopping trip, Mrs. Sommers' physical exhaustion also mirrors the weakening of her self resolve. Until she finds the stockings, Mrs. Sommers has been able to maintain her selflessness. But the temptation proves too much and she succumbs to the "mechanical impulse that directed her actions and freed her of responsibility"—words which prefigure Edna Pontellier in Chopin's later novel The Awakening. Mrs. Sommers' sojourn into a materialistic world brings her confidence, but her experience, just like the matinee she finds there, is ultimately transient. Mrs. Sommers' brief moment of happiness, Ewell suggests, must end as it does for many of Chopin's characters.
