= Fedora (short story) =

Short story written by Kate Chopin

- Short story by Kate Chopin
- "Fedora" in The Criterion

Text available at Wikisource
- Language: English

Publication
- Publisher: The Criterion
- Publication date: February 20, 1897

"Fedora" is a short story written by Kate Chopin in 1895. The story was published under the title "The Falling in Love of Fedora" in The Criterion, a local St. Louis magazine, on February 20, 1897. The story centers on Fedora, a woman who becomes infatuated with Young Malthers and his sister, Miss Malthers.

The story has garnered fairly little attention from Chopin scholars. Analysis is generally split between straight and queer readings of the work.

== Background ==
"Fedora" was written in 1895, but the story was rejected from the Atlantic Monthly because editor Horace Scudder felt it had "scarcely any story at all". The story was published in the St. Louis magazine The Criterion under the pen name "La Tour", although it is unknown why Chopin chose this pen name. The pseudonym was likely not intended to mask her identity, and she intended to include the story in her next story collection. Chopin biographer Emily Toth argued that Chopin probably knew of lesbianism through medical sexologists Richard Von Krafft-Ebing and Havelock Ellis and her close friendship with Helen, a schoolmate. Toth hypothesized that the story may have been based on an admirer of Chopin's son, Jean, kissing her daughter, Lélia, and she noted similarities between Fedora and St. Louis journalist Florence Hayward.

== Plot ==
Fedora, a thirty-year-old spinster, finds younger men and women to be uninteresting. When she meets Young Malthers, however, she becomes infatuated with him, touching his hat and coat when nobody is watching. She chooses to take Miss Malthers, Young Malthers' sister, home from the train station. On the ride back from the train station, Fedora kisses Miss Malthers, shocking the latter.

== Analysis ==
Biographer Barbara C. Ewell and scholar Joyce Dyer both view "Fedora" as a classical tale of sexual repression. Dyer characterizes Fedora as a "perverse, pathetic, desperate woman" who is only interested in Miss Malthers due to physical similarities with her brother, leading to Fedora kissing Miss Malthers as an "acceptable surrogate". For Dyer's analysis, scholar Robert L. Gale called her "the most profound analyst of 'Fedora'".

Christina G. Bucher, writing in the Mississippi Quarterly, explicitly rejects Dyer's analysis. Bucher argues that the characterization of Fedora is consistent with that of a butch lesbian and that her passion for Young Malthers is actually Fedora momentarily submitting to heteronormativity. The Cambridge Companion to Kate Chopin calls Fedora lesbian without further comment. Mariko Utsu, also writing in the Mississippi Quarterly, argues that the story could be interpreted as Fedora seeking to represent herself as a man, with her kissing of Miss Malthers following the "heteronormative script".
