= Alcée =

Alcée (or Alcee) is a given name. Notable people with the given name include:

== People ==
- Alcée Chriss III, American organist, composer, and conductor
- Alcée Fortier (1856–1914) American professor of languages in New Orleans, Louisiana
  - Alcée Fortier High School, a former high school in Uptown New Orleans, Louisiana
- Alcee Hastings (1936–2021), American politician and judge; U.S. Congressman from Florida
- Alcée Louis la Branche (1806–1861), American politician; U.S. Congressman from Louisiana

== Fictional characters ==
- Alcée, fictional character in Kate Chopin's short stories "At the Cadian Ball" (1892) and "The Storm" (1898)
- Alcée Arobin, fictional character in Kate Chopin's novel The Awakening (1899)
