= An Egyptian Cigarette =

Short story written by Kate Chopin

"An Egyptian Cigarette" is a short story written by Kate Chopin, first published in April 1900 in Vogue 15. It is about an experience induced by a powerful cigarette, leading the narrator to have a disturbing dream in which her lover abandons her.

== Plot summary ==
The narrator of this short story is handed a hand-made box of cigarettes that is made in yellow paper by an architect. The narrator is first hesitant, but then takes the box. As soon as she takes the first cigarette her mind immediately goes into a strange dream where her visions make her feel grief, love, and suicidal in the desert.

When the woman smokes the cigarette, she imagines a dark vision in her head. She imagines that she is covered in the desert sand and that her lover has abandoned her. The woman tries to follow her lover but because of her stumbling feet she ends up falling in the sand which blisters her body. She decided to lay there at night and while doing that, thinks of the water engulfing her in her sleep. She knew her love was not coming back for her because he didn't do what he always does, kiss her. And because of that, she thinks he is never coming back to her.

After the tobacco has left her body, she wakes up from her dream. The architect comes running in and gives her a cup of coffee. The narrator is afraid of what the other cigarettes might make her envision so she crumbles the rest of them up in her hand and lets the wind blow them away.

== Critical reception ==
When this short story first came out the themes of women started to change. With that being said, there are not a lot of reviews about this story. An author, Pamela Knights, commented that many critics back in the 19th century downplay Chopin's associations because of the 19th century regional writing. Chopin was limited in the subjects she could write about. Even though there are not of a lot of reviews of her short stories, another author states that "in Chopin's own day, her collections of short stories were her most esteemed works, while her novel was views with some embarrassment".

== Analysis ==
Chopin mainly focused on themes about women's sexual passion and color stories about Rural Louisiana. Her greatest work is The Awakening which received a lot of hostile criticism. For example, "critics suggest that works as The Awakening were scandalous and therefore not socially embraced". A reviewer from Choice Reviews suggested that her novel was ultimately going to struggle because her society that she lived in during the time restricted her rights of freedom to write what she wanted. This novel was not well compared to her short stories. "An Egyptian Cigarette" was perceived to be more relatable to than her novels. The themes of women began to change in the 19th century which lead Emily Toth, a professor of English and Women's Studies at Louisiana State University, to say that Kate Chopin's short stories began to see more appreciation. Emily Toth also says that women liked her short stories more during a time when American women eagerly wanted to know more about their female ancestors.
