= Suicide in literature =

Topic in literary criticism

It is common to depict suicide in literature. Suicide, the act of deliberately killing oneself, is a prominent action in many important works of literature. Authors use the suicide of a character to portray defiance, despair, love, or honor. Whether it is written as the ultimate act of devotion or the result of depression, the act of suicide was and is a prevalent action within the context of English literature.

== Novels ==
According to Lorna Ruth Wiedmann, novelistic suicide patterns first emerged in the nineteenth century. She categorized nineteenth-century works based on five themes: "murder-followed-by-suicide; the survivor of suicide; age and the suicide; the suicide's choice of method; and gender and suicide." Kevin Grauke stated that suicide serves an "ambivalent rhetorical function" in the works of the nineteenth-century. Authors such as Kate Chopin, Ernest Hemingway, and Virginia Woolf include themes of suicide in their writing.

== Shakespeare ==
William Shakespeare's characters die by suicide in several of his plays. In the final scene of Romeo and Juliet, the titular young lovers both die by suicide. Suicide also occurs in Julius Caesar when Brutus and Cassius both kill themselves. In Othello, the title character dies by suicide, using a dagger after murdering his wife. The play Antony and Cleopatra ends with five suicides, including the deaths of both Antony and Cleopatra.

== Controversy ==
The subject of suicide itself is controversial. While the act of suicide can be symbolic in literature, the act itself still possesses the ability to cause controversy in the real world. Kate Chopin's novel, The Awakening, was extremely controversial when it was released in 1899.

Some authors who have created characters that die by suicide have died by suicide themselves. Ernest Hemingway shot himself in 1961; Some of his short stories included suicidal themes.

== Quotations ==
"Once suicide was accepted as a common fact of society- not as a noble Roman alternative, nor as the mortal sin it had been in the Middle Ages, nor as a special cause to be pleaded or warned against- but simply as something people did, often and without much hesitation, like committing adultery, then it automatically became a common property of art." - diaz, 1971.
