= Grand Isle (1991 film) =

- Directed by: Mary Lambert
- Written by: Hesper Anderson
- Based on: The Awakening by Kate Chopin
- Starring: Kelly McGillis; Adrian Pasdar; Julian Sands; Jon DeVries; Glenne Headly; Ellen Burstyn
- Cinematography: Toyomichi Kurita
- Edited by: Tom Finan
- Music by: Elliot Goldenthal
- Production company: Turner Pictures
- Distributed by: Turner Network Television
- Release dates: September 9, 1991 (TIFF); November 15, 1991 (Women in Film Festival)
- Running time: 97 minutes (TV Cut), 112 minutes (Theatrical)
- Country: United States
- Language: English

Grand Isle is a 1991 film directed by Mary Lambert. It is based on the early feminist novel The Awakening by Kate Chopin, first published in 1899. It starred Kelly McGillis as Edna Pontellier, Jon DeVries as Léonce Pontellier and Adrian Pasdar as Robert Lebrun.
