= Goosetown =

Goosetown may refer to:

- A nickname of Upper Nyack, New York
- Goosetown: Reconstructing an Akron Neighborhood, a book by Joyce Dyer
- Goosetown, a fictional town in Duck universe
