= Aage Jørgensen (historian) =

Danish literary historian

- Born: 5 June 1938
- Died: 25 March 2023 (aged 84)
- Education: Aarhus University
- Occupation: Literary historian

Aage Jørgensen (5 June 1938 – 25 March 2023) was a Danish literary historian and author.

Aage Jørgensen graduated from Ribe Cathedral School in 1957 and earned a Cand.art. degree in Danish and literary history from Aarhus University in 1966. He was employed at Aarhus University from 1967 to 1975, first as a graduate fellow and assistant professor, then as a substitute lecturer. Between 1975 and 2002, he was employed at Langkær Gymnasium as a lecturer. From 1978 to 1988, he represented the Ministry of Education in the Danish Language Council. From 1994 to 2013, he was a member of the steering committee for Johannes V. Jensen Forum at Aarhus University. He was a member of the Danish Society for Language and Literature from 2005.

Aage Jørgensen published a number of writings (monographs, collected works, bibliographies) on Hans Christian Andersen, Karen Blixen, Søren Kierkegaard, Adam Oehlenschläger among others, and received awards including the Danish Writers Association's Hans Christian Andersen Scholarship in 1999 and the Hans Christian Andersen Award in 2008. From 1989, he published around 20 books primarily related to Hans Christian Andersen and Johannes V. Jensen, contributed to several books, and published around 50 journal articles.

Aage Jørgensen's 2009 book, Nærved og næsten, describes a number of Danish writers and other authors who were considered for the Nobel Prize in Literature.

== Bibliography ==
The following publications can be mentioned:

- Oehlenschläger-litteraturen 1850–1966 (1966)
- Kundskaben på ondt og godt (1968)
- Folkevisesproget (1969)
- H.C. Andersen-litteraturen 1875–1968 (1970)
- Omkredsninger. Artikler og anmeldelser (1974)
- Dansk litteraturhistorisk bibliografi 1967–1986 (1989)
- Idyll and Abyss. Essays on Danish Literature and Theater (1992)
- H.C. Andersen-litteraturen 1969–1994 (1995)
- Litteratur om Johannes V. Jensen (1998; supplement and continuation 2005)
- Bøgens Fædreland – og andre guldalderstudier (1999)
- Selvbibliografi (2000)
- H.C. Andersen-litteraturen 1995–2006 (2007)
- Søren Kierkegaard 1956–2006. A Bibliography (2009)
- Nærved og næsten. Danske Nobelpristabere fra Brandes til Blixen – en dokumentation (2009)
- Oehlenschläger-litteraturen 1850–2014 (2015)
- Dansk litteraturforskning i det 21. århundrede. Dansk litteraturhistorisk bibliografi 2000–2014 (2015)
- Jens Peter Jacobsen bibliografi. Litteraturhenvisninger 1967–2015 (2016)
- Karen Blixens udeblevne Nobelpris og andre præciseringer (2017)
- "Litteratur om Karen Blixen. En bibliografi" (2020)
- Modernitetens problematiske velsignelse og andre H.C. Andersen'ske præciseringer (2020)

=== About and by Johannes V. Jensen ===
==== Publications of Johannes V. Jensen's works ====
- Jensen, Johannes (2006). Andersen, Anders; Christensen, Erik; Dahl, Per; Jørgensen, Aage (eds.). Samlede Digte (in Danish, Jutish, German, and English). Copenhagen: Gyldendal. ISBN 978-87-02-02939-0. LCCN 2007451667. OL 16884143M. Wikidata Q21996304.
- Jensen, Johannes (2014), Jørgensen, Aage (ed.), Ord og virkelighed: Forfatterskabets hidtil ikke optrykte artikler, Johannes V. Jensen-Centrets skriftserie (in Danish and German), Aage Jørgensen, Wikidata Q28088128
- Jensen, Johannes (2018). Dahl, Per; Jørgensen, Aage (eds.). Himmerlandshistorier. Danske Klassikere (in Danish) (1st ed.). Gyldendal. ISBN 978-87-7533-237-3. Wikidata Q51486642. Editor and afterword writer together with Per Dahl.
- Jensen, Johannes (2018), Kirken i Farsø (in Danish), Farsø: Johannes V. Jensen Museum, Wikidata Q101225698 Afterword
- Jensen, Johannes (2019). Intermezzo og Skovene. Johannes V. Jensen-Centrets skriftserie (in Danish) (1st ed.). ISBN 978-87-93610-73-6. Wikidata Q96869931. Editor and afterword.

==== Books with literary historical articles ====
- Elbrønd-Bek, Bo; Jørgensen, Aage, eds. (1989). Jordens elsker (in Danish). Copenhagen: Akademisk Forlag. ISBN 87-500-2873-1. OL 1953713M. Wikidata Q56253941.
- Jørgensen, Aage; Andersen, Anders, eds. (2000). Et spring ind i et billede: Om Johannes V. Jensen mytedigtning. Johannes V. Jensen-Centrets skriftserie (in Danish). Odense: University Press of Southern Denmark. ISBN 87-7838-525-3. Wikidata Q56008555.
- Andersen, Anders; Dahl, Per; Jørgensen, Aage, eds. (2008). I Nuets Spejl: Læsninger i Johannes V. Jensens digte (in Danish). Gyldendal. ISBN 978-87-02-06997-6. Wikidata Q22249755.

==== Books with collections of own contributions ====
- Jørgensen, Aage (2013). Tilblivelsens digter. Johannes V. Jensen-Centrets skriftserie (in Danish). ISBN 978-87-92824-86-8. OL 54558446M. Wikidata Q76376180.
  - Jørgensen, Aage (2013). "Johannes V. Jensen og billedkunsten". Tilblivelsens digter. Johannes V. Jensen-Centrets skriftserie (in Danish). ISBN 978-87-92824-86-8. Wikidata Q124048998.
- Jørgensen, Aage (2017). Den Store Jensen og andre præciseringer. Johannes V. Jensen-Centrets skriftserie (in Danish). ISBN 978-87-93382-93-0. OCLC 1031902117. Wikidata Q50751602.
  - Jørgensen, Aage (2017). "Johannes V. Jensens valgslægtskaber". Den Store Jensen og andre præciseringer. Johannes V. Jensen-Centrets skriftserie (in Danish). pp. 9–130. ISBN 978-87-93382-93-0. Wikidata Q105427504.
- Jørgensen, Aage (2021). Litteratur om Johannes V. Jensen 1998-2020: En bibliografi ved Aage Jørgensen (in Danish). Odense: University Press of Southern Denmark. ISBN 978-87-408-3391-1. Wikidata Q124247052.

==== Journal articles ====
- Jørgensen, Aage (1995). "Himmerlandsmaler og Viborgforfatter". Bogens verden (in Danish) (4). ISSN 0006-5692. Wikidata Q56022714.
- Jørgensen, Aage (2001). "Johannes V. Jensens vej til Nobelprisen". Tijdschrift voor Skandinavistiek (in Danish). 22 (2). ISSN 0168-2148. Wikidata Q66345642.
- Jørgensen, Aage (2011). "Johannes Møllehave: En himmerlandsk mundfuld. Lystlæsning af Johannes V. Jensens 40 "Himmerlandshistorier" – fra gru til glæde. Højbjerg: Forlaget Saxo 2010. 316 s., 1 vedlagt CD ("12 Himmerlandshistorier")". Tijdschrift voor Skandinavistiek (in Danish). 32: 118–128. ISSN 0168-2148. Wikidata Q55672265.
- Jørgensen, Aage (2012). "Et drilsk overflødigt komma". SALON 55 (in Danish) (2): 84. Wikidata Q90481260.
- Jørgensen, Aage (2013). "Johannes V. Jensens Himmerlandshistorier. En teksthistorisk afklaring". NORDICA (in Danish). 30: 233–242. ISSN 0109-3967. Wikidata Q55950599.
- Jørgensen, Aage (2015). "Omkring Johannes V. Jensens himmerlandshistorie "Wombwell"". European Journal of Scandinavian Studies. 45 (1): 16–34. doi:10.1515/ejss-2015-0002. Wikidata Q26211612.
- Jørgensen, Aage (2015). "Skalmejen, hyrdedrengens trøst" (PDF). Ord & Sag (in Danish). 35: 4–9. ISSN 0108-8025. Wikidata Q73266622.
- Jørgensen, Aage (2018). "Jensen mellem gengangere". Passage (in Danish). 33 (80): 147–149. doi:10.7146/pas.v33i80.111730. Wikidata Q100151798.
- Jørgensen, Aage (2019). "Johannes V. Jensen som fiktionsfigur". Fra Himmerland og Kjær Herred (in Danish). ISSN 0107-9301. Wikidata Q105752823.
