= Aage Jørgensen =

Aage Jørgensen may refer to:

- Aage Jørgensen (gymnast) (1900 – 1972)
- Aage Jørgensen (historian) (1938 – 2023)
- Aage Jørgensen (footballer) (1903 – 1967)

== See also ==
- Aage Winther-Jørgensen, Danish actor
