= The Joy That Kills =

- Genre: Drama; Romance
- Based on: "The Story of an Hour" by Kate Chopin
- Written by: Tina Rathborne; Nancy Dyer
- Directed by: Tina Rathborne
- Starring: Frances Conroy; Jeffrey DeMunn
- Music by: Jed Feuer
- Country of origin: United States
- Original language: English

Production
- Producers: Tina Rathborne; Sue Felt; Tony Mark
- Cinematography: Misha Suslov
- Editor: Cindy Kaplan
- Running time: 56 minutes
- Production companies: Cypress Films; Mark/Jett Productions

Original release
- Network: PBS
- Release: January 28, 1985

The Joy that Kills is a 1985 American made-for-television film adaptation of Kate Chopin's 1894 short story "The Story of an Hour." It was directed by Tina Rathborne and co-written by Rathborne and Nancy Dyer. It was broadcast on the PBS television program American Playhouse on January 28, 1985. The production was filmed at the Gallier House Museum in New Orleans.

== Cast ==
- Frances Conroy as Louise Mallard
- Jeffrey DeMunn as Brently Mallard
- Rosalind Cash as Maggie
- Elizabeth Franz as Josephine
- Patrick Horgan as Doctor LeBrun
- Lee Richardson as Louise’s father
