= The Story of an Hour =

Short story by Kate Chopin

- Short story by Kate Chopin
- Language: English
- Genre: Short story

Publication
- Published in: United States
- Publication type: Magazine
- Publisher: Vogue
- Publication date: 1894

"The Story of an Hour" is a short story written by Kate Chopin on April 19, 1894. Originally, the story was published as "The Dream of an Hour" in Vogue on December 6, 1894, pages 55 - 56. Later, it was reprinted in St. Louis Life on January 5, 1895, as "The Story of an Hour".

The title of the short story refers to the time elapsed in which the protagonist, Louise Mallard, hears that her husband, Brently Mallard, is dead, and then, at the end of the hour, discovers that he is alive after all. Featuring a female protagonist who feels grief and relief, the story explores how Louise ponders her new identity made possible by the idea of her husband's death. Female Liberation and individuality made "The Story of an Hour" controversial by the 1890s American standards.

== Plot ==
"The Story of an Hour" follows Louise Mallard, the protagonist, who is said to have heart issues at the beginning of the story. Louise's sister, Josephine, gently informs her of the death of her husband, Brently, in a railroad accident. Louise immediately reacts by sobbing wildly and then retreats to her room. She undergoes a "possess[ing]" by a feeling where she comes to realize she is now free to do as she wills due to her husband's death. This realization brings her joy: "She breathed a quick prayer that life might be long." Later, she heads back downstairs, only to see Brently, who had inadvertently avoided the railroad accident, entering the front door. Her joy turns to shock at the sight of her husband, leading to her death by heart attack.

== Characters ==
- Louise Mallard: She is the protagonist who suffers from “heart trouble.” She is the wife of Brently Mallard and sister of Josephine. She grieves her husband's death after finding out that he died in a railroad accident. Although she is upset and grieves him at first, she comes to realize that she now has her freedom to live her life only for herself.
- Brently Mallard: He is the husband of Louise Mallard. He is believed to be dead at the start of the story. Only after Louise starts to feel joy with her new freedom does he return home, not knowing he was believed to be dead.
- Josephine: She is the sister of Louise Mallard. She is the one to inform Louise of Brently Mallard's death and console Louise during her bout of grief.
- Richards: He is Brently Mallard's friend. He was the one to learn of Brently's supposed death and inform Josephine, Louise's sister, about it.

== Themes ==
=== Liberation ===
Hassin Ur Rehman and Hafiz Imran Nawaz, authors of the article “The Story of an Hour: A Feminist Perspective,” argue that Kate Chopin "has her own way to define feminism". “The Story of an Hour” was an important work for its time because it highlighted women's desire for freedom and independence. Rehman and Nawaz state that Louise is primarily defined as Mrs. Mallard until she emerges from her room as Louise, symbolizing her position in a liminal space between societal expectations and personal liberation. While alone in her room, she begins to notice the world outside her window for the first time, recognizing its beauty and vitality, which inspires her hope for freedom.

The article “Emotions in The Story of an Hour” explains how Louise’s freedom comes about by looking at her observation of nature, which serves as a reflection of her own transformation. Just as spring follows winter, she emerges from a period of emotional dormancy into one filled with vibrant possibilities. Although the story states that "she was striving to beat [her feelings of freedom] back," her sense of exhilaration ultimately prevails. Embracing her newfound independence, Louise is determined to move forward into the world on her new, liberated terms. However, as she makes her symbolic descent down the stairs, anticipating a hopeful future, Brently Mallard unexpectedly appears at the front door. Confronted with the sudden collapse of her dreams of freedom, Louise suffers a fatal heart attack.

=== Identity ===
The idea of Identity is closely connected with the liberation of this story. Looking at another article, "Perspectival Strategies in Kate Chopin's "The Story of an Hour," the audience can see Louise being first introduced as Mrs. Mallard. Pia Masiero argues that this means that Chopin is showing Louise’s initial identity, the wife of Mr. Brently Mallard. Chopin has Josephine as an excellent foil in this regard, having a last name to exemplify the role Mrs. Mallard currently occupies in society, a wife. As she is referred to this way likely by everyone If her own sister calls her this, this is her identity to everyone. After Brently dies though, she is in her room, and Josephine refers to her as Louise. Changing the feeling of the story. In Lousie’s room is where she discovers this feeling of freedom and that is when her name in the story changes. Similarly, scholar Lora Geriguis explores how Mrs. Mallard’s transformation into Louise reveals her true self. Her death at the end is inevitable because she has discovered how life could be, how her identity could be only about herself and her own desires, and she cannot live without that life. Louise cannot go back to Mrs. Mallard and therefore, she died.

== Critical responses ==
In Unveiling Kate Chopin, Emily Toth argues that Chopin "had to have her heroine die" in order to make the story publishable. In a 2020 article, Cihan Yazgı provides a different perspective on why Chopin made this choice, and analyses her death as a part of the story's tragic plot. Drawing upon the Aristotelian formula and supporting his reading with stylistic evidence from the text, Yazgı argues that it is possible to understand the story's plot in terms of classical tragic elements of anagnorisis, peripeteia and catastrophe. He states that Chopin's reliance on these elements in structuring her plot helps Chopin to attain sympathy for Mrs. Mallard and to have her readership reflect with a critical eye on gender politics. Meanwhile, Yazgı uses textual evidence to emphasize Chopin's stylistic mastery in creating a language that "reveal[s] in half concealing", which makes these tragic elements achieve their intended effects: The delaying of information creates a feeling of suspense and anticipation that eventually makes Mrs. Mallard's anagnorisis and catastrophe the more striking.

Bert Bender, an English professor at Arizona State University, offers a biographical reading of the text and argues that writing of the 1890s was influenced by Charles Darwin's theory of sexual selection. Chopin's understanding of the meaning of love and courtship, in particular, was altered and became more pessimistic. This attitude finds its expression in "The Story of an Hour" when Mrs. Mallard questions the meaning of love and ultimately rejects it as meaningless.

In her article, "Emotions in 'The Story of An Hour", Selina Jamil argues that Chopin portrays Mrs. Mallard's perception of her husband's supposed death as fostered by emotions, rather than by rationality. Jamil claims that up until that point, Mrs. Mallard's life has been devoid of emotion to such an extent that she has even wondered if it is worth living. The repression of emotion may represent Mrs. Mallard's repressive husband, who had, up until that point, "smothered" and "silenced" her will. Therefore, her newfound freedom is brought on by an influx of emotion (representing the death of her repressive husband) that adds meaning and value to her life. Although Mrs. Mallard initially feels fear when she hears of her husband's death, the strength of the emotion is so powerful that Mrs. Mallard actually feels joy (because she can realize her newfound freedoms). Since this "joy that kills" ultimately leads to Mrs. Mallard's death, one possible interpretation is that the repression of Mrs. Mallard's feelings is what killed her in the end.

In the same article, Jamil shows the repression that Mrs. Mallard faces as a wife. She realizes after her husband's apparent death that she is "free, free, free". This shows how her life would change and that she is now a new person, removed from the repressed life she faced before. No evidence is given in the story about how she is repressed, but her reaction to his death and her newfound confidence and freedom are enough. This repression of herself, that she dealt with, has now been removed with the death of her husband, enabling her to be free. Jamil additionally accuses patriarchy of repressing Louise's emotions. Jamil argues that Mrs. Mallard was "[oblivious] to the beauty of life" due to her marriage. It is only after she is free from the bonds of patriarchy, insinuated by the death of her husband, is she able to feel a medley of emotions.

In a 2013 article, Jeremy Foote, a researcher at Purdue University, argues that "The Story of an Hour" can be read as a commentary and warning about technology—specifically the railroad and the telegraph. The railroad, he claims, may be the cause of the distance between the Mallards (and many other couples of the time). It allowed for work and home to be very distant from each other and eliminated opportunities for spouses to spend time together. Foote argues that the reason that Louise Mallard wanted more autonomy was because she and her husband did not spend time together. The alone time that Louise had in the house made her less close to her husband, and made her want her independence.

While most readers infer Kate Chopin's "The Story of an Hour" is about the awakening of feminine awareness and the struggle for freedom in a man's world, Li Chongyue and Wang Lihua offer a new analysis. Chopin provides little background on both Mr. and Mrs. Mallard. However, there's enough evidence to assume they live a comfortable life. In the article, Li and Wang point out how Brently Mallard loved his wife, but she didn't feel the same. Mr. Mallard was often away from home on business trips to provide for his wife. Meanwhile, Louise only loved him "sometimes" and "often she had not loved him". Instead of a loving, ill wife, Mrs. Mallard is actually seen as ungrateful and unfaithful to her husband. Li and Wang conclude that such a woman cannot live on this earth, therefore, causing her death.

When she hears of her husband's death, Mrs. Mallard weeps in her sister's arms. Her reaction could be seen as genuine and coming from a place of pain. However, a second look could suggest that these are tears of joy. She was "pressed down by a physical exhaustion that haunted her body and seemed to reach her soul" simply because she was tired of her life and needed a change. After emerging from her room following the news of her husband, "she carried herself unwittingly like a goddess of Victory."

== Film adaptation ==
In 1984, director Tina Rathbone released a film adaptation of the story titled The Joy That Kills. The main character, portrayed by Frances Conroy, also suffers from a heart condition, just as Louise Mallard does. This production is mostly concerned with the psychological state of the main character.
