= Désirée's Baby =

- Short story by Kate Chopin
- Country: United States
- Language: English
- Genre: Short story

Publication
- Published in: Vogue
- Publication date: 1893

"Désirée's Baby" is an 1893 short story by the American writer Kate Chopin. It is about multiethnic relationships in Creole Louisiana during the antebellum period.

== Plot summary ==
Désirée is the adopted daughter of Monsieur and Madame Valmondé, who are wealthy French Creoles in antebellum Louisiana. Abandoned as a baby, she was found by Monsieur Valmondé lying in the shadow of a stone pillar near the Valmondé gateway. She is courted by the son of another wealthy, well-known and respected French Creole family, Armand Aubigny. They marry and have a child. People who see the baby have the sense it is different. Eventually they realize that the baby's skin is the same color as that of a quadroon (one-quarter African)—the baby has African ancestry.

Because of Désirée's unknown parents, the presumption arises that she is part black. Désirée denies the accusation. Désirée sends Madame Valmondé a letter asking her to confirm that she is white to which Madame Valmondé responds by telling her that she can return home, to her estate, with the baby. Armand, scornful of Désirée, tells her that he wants her to leave. She takes their child and walks off into a bayou, never to be seen again. Armand burns all of Désirée's belongings, even the child's cradle, as well as all of the letters that she had sent him during their courtship. In the same drawer where this bundle of letters was kept, he retains a letter written from his mother to his father, revealing that Armand is the one who is part black. Désirée's ancestry is never defined.

== Publication history ==
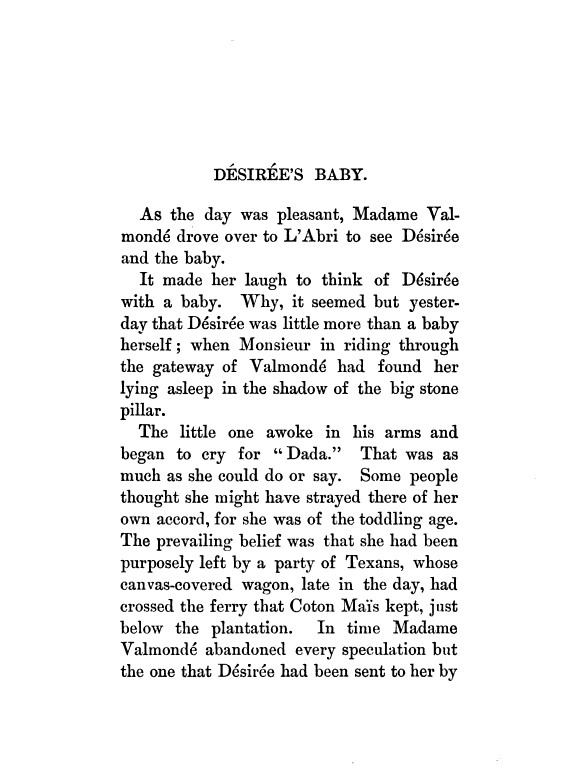
"Désirée's Baby" as it appeared in Bayou Folk, 1894

"Désirée's Baby" was first published on January 14, 1893, in Vogue. It first appeared under the title "The Father of Désirée's Baby" in a section called "Character Studies". The same issue included Chopin's story "A Visit to Avoyelles"; both marked Chopin's first contributions to the magazine which would eventually publish 18 of her works before the end of the century. "Désirée's Baby" was included in Chopin's collection Bayou Folk in 1894.

== Themes and literary classification ==
Though Kate Chopin is usually considered to be a writer of American realism and naturalism, the story is difficult to classify, in part because it is extremely short. The story leaves the moral conclusion up to the reader, suggesting it is naturalistic, but the fairytale-like elements of the love story are inconsistent with either naturalism or realism. The atmosphere of the story and the characterization of Armand create gothic undertones.

Though brief, the story raises important issues that plagued Chopin's South, particularly the pervasive and destructive, yet ambiguous nature of racism, especially given the numerous people of color in the society. Chopin uses imagery associated with color — whiteness versus blackness, the use of yellow to denote mixed heritage, and value judgements placed on different tones of white and black — to pull out the deeper racial themes to her story. The story also questions the potential fulfillment of woman's identity — a subject that fascinated the unconventional Chopin. In her portrayal of Désirée, a woman whose self-worth and self-exploration is intrinsically linked to that of her husband, Chopin opened the door to her lifelong query into a woman's struggle for a place where she could fully belong. This story focuses on themes of hypocrisy and gender equality.
