= American Studies in Scandinavia =

- Discipline: American studies
- Language: English
- Edited by: Janne Lahti

Publication details
- History: 1968–present
- Publisher: University Press of Southern Denmark
- Frequency: Biannual
- Open access: Yes

Standard abbreviations
- ISO 4: Am. Stud. Scand.

Indexing
- ISSN: 0044-8060 (print); 1080-6490 (web)
- LCCN: 72620174
- OCLC no.: 1013330503

Links
- Journal homepage; Online access; Online archive

American Studies in Scandinavia is a biannual peer-reviewed, academic journal covering American studies, especially from the Scandinavian countries. It was established in 1968 and is published by the University Press of Southern Denmark. The journal is sponsored by the Nordic Association for American Studies and the Nordic Publications Committee for Humanist Periodicals. The current editor-in-chief is Janne Lahti (University of Helsinki).

== Abstracting and indexing ==
The journal is abstracted and indexed in the Arts & Humanities Citation Index, Current Contents/Arts & Humanities, and Scopus.
