= Nordic Association for American Studies =

- Abbreviation: NAAS
- Formation: 1959
- Founded at: Oslo
- Region served: Scandinavia
- Fields: American Studies
- Website: https://www.nordicaas.org

The Nordic Association for American Studies (NAAS) is a scholarly society founded in 1959 which aims to promote the study of the United States in the five Nordic countries and to facilitate communication between scholars interested in this field. Membership is open to individuals who live in or have a scholarly connection to Denmark, Norway, Sweden, Finland or Iceland. The organization has five sub-organizations for each country (the Swedish Association for American Studies, the Danish Association for American Studies, the American Studies Association of Norway, the Finnish American Studies Association, and the Icelandic Association) and is, taken as a whole, a constituent member of The European Association for American Studies. It publishes the journal American Studies in Scandinavia and holds a conference every two years. It has so far arranged 27 conferences.
