= Kitty Garesche =

American nun and academic headmistress

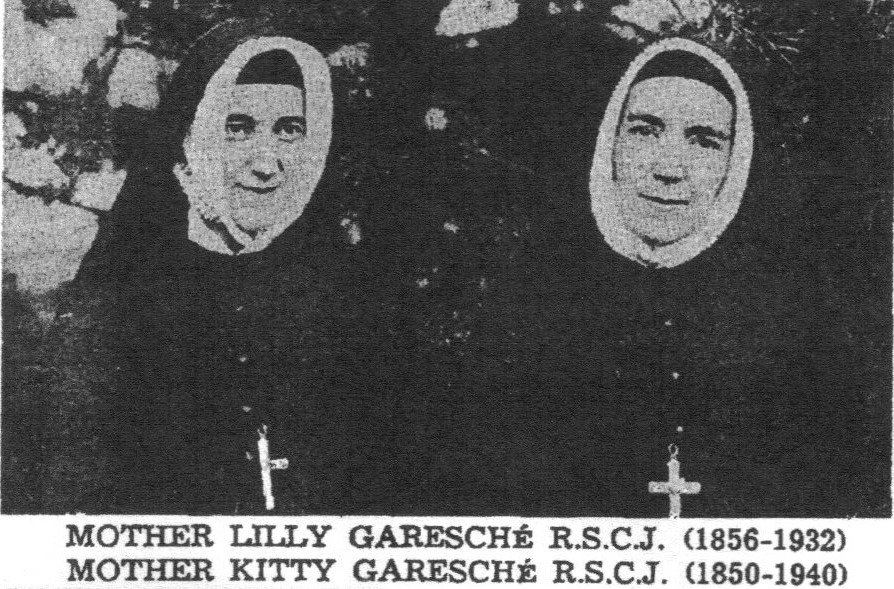
Lilly Garesché and Kitty Garesché

Katherine Milligan “Kitty” Garesché (August 24, 1850 - March 10, 1940) was the founder and headmistress of the Convent of the Sacred Heart High School in San Francisco, California. She was Kate Chopin's longtime friend.

== Biography ==
Katherine Milligan “Kitty” Garesché was born on August 24, 1850, in St. Louis, Missouri, the daughter of Peter Bauduy Garesché (1822–1868) and Juliette McLane (1826–1885). She was the oldest daughter, and after her came Lilly, Virginia and John.

She attended the Academy of the Sacred Heart in St. Louis, Missouri. While at the academy, she became best friend of Kate Chopin. They were separated in 1863, when the Garesché's were banished from St. Louis for their Confederate sympathies.

Garesché attended school in New York and graduated in 1868. She was expected to make her debut when her father suddenly died. She entered the novitiate at Maryville, St Louis, and took her vows on February 2, 1872. She was the first of her family to enter Order of the Sacred Heart, but later her sister Lily and her mother Juliette (after she remained a widow), followed her. Her mother brought with her the household furnishings, some of which are still in use today at the campus of Maryville College.

Juliette McLane Garesché was born a Protestant but had become interested in Catholicism and during a winter spent in New York she was instructed and baptized by Archbishop Hughes. After the death of her husband and in rapid succession those of her daughter Virginia, and son, John Peter, she decided to enter the convent in 1878. She made her vows at the old City House on Broadway, St. Louis, Bishop Ryan, an intimate friend of the family officiating, and her two daughters being present. She was sent to Timaru, New Zealand, to assist in starting a convent and school there, and in 1881 made her profession in Paris. Returning to St. Louis she was made superior at the City House, but her health failing she was sent to Louisiana in hopes that a warmer climate would be beneficial. She died at St. Michael's in July, 1885.

Lilly Garesche was for years superior at Maryville, at Clifton in Cincinnati; at Duchesne, Omaha, Nebraska; and at the City House. She was one of the most beloved nuns St. Louis has ever known. For many years, she was the directress of the Sodality, and spent much of her time in the convent parlor, listening to women's troubles and comforting them.

In 1887, together with another classmate from the Sacred Heart Academy who had become a nun as well, Elise "Liza" Miltenberger (b. 1848), Kitty Garesché opened the Convent of the Sacred Heart High School in San Francisco. Miltenberger was the daughter of an old St. Louis French family. The new Sacred Heart Academy had a three-member house council: Mother Mary O'Meara, Kitty Garesché and Elise Miltenberger; Garesché became Mistress General (headmistress).

In 1900, Chopin wrote a poem for Kitty Garesche's 50th birthday:

- It is not all of life
- To cling together while the years
- glide past.
- It is not all of love
- To walk with clasped hands from
- first to last.
- That mystic garland which the
- spring did twine
- Of scented lilac and the new-
- blown rose,
- Faster than chains will hold my
- soul to thine
- Thro’ joy, and grief, thro’ life-
- unto its close.

There are several letters of Garesché in Kate Chopin and Her Creole Stories by Daniel S. Rankin. Written in her old age, the letters tell of the friendship with Chopin, their school days and life in St. Louis in the 1860s.

Later in life, Garesche became a teacher at the Sacred Heart Academy in Grosse Pointe becoming in the end its superior. She died on March 10, 1940, in Grosse Pointe, Michigan, and is buried at Mount Olivet Cemetery, Detroit, Michigan.
