= Akademisk Forlag =

Akademisk Forlag is a Danish book publishing company based in Copenhagen. It publishes professional literature and textbooks mainly for university level, especially in the areas of psychology, psychiatry, health, nursing, medicine, and education.

Akademisk Forlag is one of the publishers under Lindhardt og Ringhof which in turn is part of the Egmont Group, also based in Copenhagen.
