= The Southern Quarterly =

- Discipline: Arts, cultural studies
- Language: English

Publication details
- History: 1962–present
- Publisher: The University of Southern Mississippi

Standard abbreviations
- ISO 4: South. Q.

Indexing
- ISSN: 0038-4496

Links
- Journal homepage

The Southern Quarterly is a peer-reviewed academic journal published by the University of Southern Mississippi that focuses on Southern arts and culture. One of the oldest journals dedicated to scholarship about the American south, it debuted in 1962 and is available via Project MUSE.
