= Per Seyersted =

Per Eynert Seyersted (18 May 1921 – 3 April 2005) was a Professor of American Literature at the American Institute at the University of Oslo.

Seyersted was born in Oslo, Norway. He earned his master's degree at Harvard University in 1959 and earned his doctoral degree (dr. philos.) in 1969 at the University of Oslo.

He was internationally renowned for his monograph on 19th century novelist Kate Chopin. His last monograph was a study of the works of Robert Cantwell. According to Professor of American Literature Per Winther, Seyersted’s book on Chopin became an important reference for the emergence of feminist literary criticism in the 1970s and 1980s and his work has been crucial in the rediscovery of Chopin.

== Select publications ==
- Kate Chopin: A Critical Biography. Baton Rouge: Louisiana State University Press, 1969
- "Kate Chopin (1851–1904) ." American Literary Realism (Spring 1970): 153-159.
- "A Survey of Trends and Figures in Afro-American Fiction ." American Studies in Scandinavia 6 (1973–74): 67-86.
- "The American Girl from Howells to Chopin." Arbeiten aus Anglistik und Amerikanistik 13, no. 2 (1988): 183-192
- ""Who Do You Think You Are?’: Alice Munro and the Place of Origin." American Studies in Scandinavia 24, no. 1 (1992): 17-23.
- Toth, Emily and Per Seyersted, eds. Kate Chopin’s Private Papers. Bloomington and Indianapolis: Indiana University Press, 1998.
- Robert Cantwell: An American 1930s Radical Writer and His Apostasy. Introduction by Alan Wald. Oslo: Novus Press, 2004.
