= Joyce Dyer =

American writer

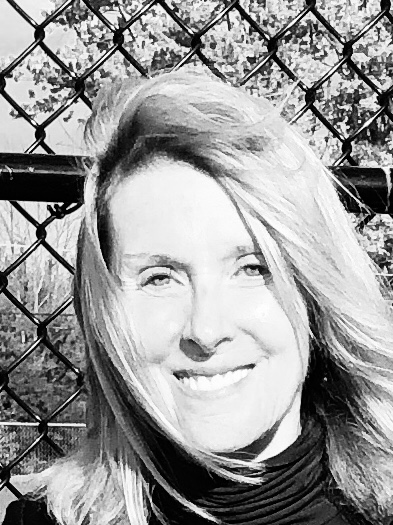
Dyer in 2019

Joyce Dyer (born Joyce Coyne) is a U.S. writer of nonfiction and former university professor at Hiram College. Born in Akron, Ohio, many of Dyer's works focus on her family and the Ohio experience.

== Life ==
Joyce (Coyne) Dyer was born in Akron, Ohio. Her father, Thomas William Coyne, was a plant supervisor for the Firestone Tire and Rubber Company and her mother clerked for the Akron Board of Education. Dyer graduated from Wittenberg University (in Springfield, Ohio) with a BA in English and earned a PhD in English from Kent State University. After completing her PhD, Dyer taught English at Lake Forest College, Western Reserve Academy, and then Hiram College, where she was the first director of the Lindsay-Crane Center for Writing and Literature and held the John S. Kenyon Chair in English for many years. She is currently Professor Emerita of English from Hiram College.

Joyce was married to the late Daniel Osborn Dyer, fellow writer and educator.

== Work ==
Dyer has written six nonfiction books, as well as published numerous essays in magazines and newspapers such as North American Review, the New York Times, Writer's Chronicle, and Southern Literary Journal. She has also edited or co-edited two collections of essays, Bloodroot: Reflections on Place by Appalachian Women Writers (1998) and From Curlers to Chainsaws: Women and Their Machines (co-edited, 2016).

Dyer's first book, The Awakening: A Novel of Beginnings, was an academic study of late-19th-century author Kate Chopin. She then turned to memoirs, writing In a Tangled Wood: An Alzheimer's Journey, about her mother's last years in a memory care center.

Her father's difficult experiences at Firestone Tire and Rubber Company inspired Dyer to write Gum-Dipped: A Daughter Remembers Rubber Town (2003), a mix of Akron and personal history. Gum-Dipped attempts to reconstruct the role of the rubber industry in the life of midcentury Akron, Ohio, through Dyer's relationship to her father.

Dyer next wrote a prequel, Goosetown: Reconstructing an Akron Neighborhood (2010), which describes her early childhood in Old Wolf Ledge (also called "Goosetown", because of the backyard geese many local German immigrant families kept).

Ten years were spent researching her next book, Pursuing John Brown: On the Trail of a Radical Abolitionist (2022) -- a mix of memoir, biography, public history, and travel writing that analyzes the troubling life of its eponymous figure.

The University of Akron Press is currently moving her most recent book toward publication -- a unique memoir about loss and Grief titled Tongueless.

=== Personal memoirs ===
- (Southern Methodist University Press, 1996) In a Tangled Wood: An Alzheimer's Journey
- (University of Akron Press, 2003) Gum-Dipped: A Daughter Remembers Rubber Town
- (University of Akron Press, 2010) Goosetown: Reconstructing an Akron Neighborhood
- (University of Akron Press, tentative 2028 pub date) Tongueless

=== Other nonfiction ===
- (Twayne/Macmillan, 1993) The Awakening: A Novel of Beginnings
- (University of Akron Press, 2022) Pursuing John Brown: On the Trail of a Radical Abolitionist (honorable mention in Civil War Monitor's yearly "Best Civil War Books" and a 2023 Ohioana Book Award Finalist in Nonfiction)

=== Edited collections ===
- (University Press of Kentucky, 1998) Bloodroot: Reflections on Place by Appalachian Women Writers (1998 Appalachian Book of the Year)
- (Michigan State University Press, co-edited, 2016) From Curlers to Chainsaws: Women and Their Machines (Independent Book Publisher Gold Medal Award for anthology)

== Other Awards ==
- David B. Saunders Award in Creative Nonfiction (2009)
- Individual Artist Grant from Ohio Arts Council (1997, 2013)
- NEH-Reader's Digest Teacher-Scholar Award, full-year sabbatical (1990-1991; one winner per state)
