= Tina Rathborne =

American film director

- Born: 1950 (age 74–75)
- Occupation(s): Film director, screenwriter
- Years active: 1985–2001

Ernestine "Tina" Rathborne (born 1950) is an American film director and screenwriter. She is best known for writing and directing the 1988 film Zelly and Me, her feature film directorial debut. Prior to this, she directed the television film The Joy That Kills (1984), which later became an episode of the anthology series American Playhouse. Rathborne also went on to direct two episodes of the television series Twin Peaks ("Episode 3", "Episode 17").

Rathborne is an alumna of Harvard University. She was married to real estate developer and conservationist Philip Yardley DeNormandie from 1973 until their 1987 divorce. They later remarried and had two children. Their second divorce was filed in 2017 and finalized in 2023; Rathborne initiated both divorces.
