= The Criterion (American magazine) =

Former American literary magazine

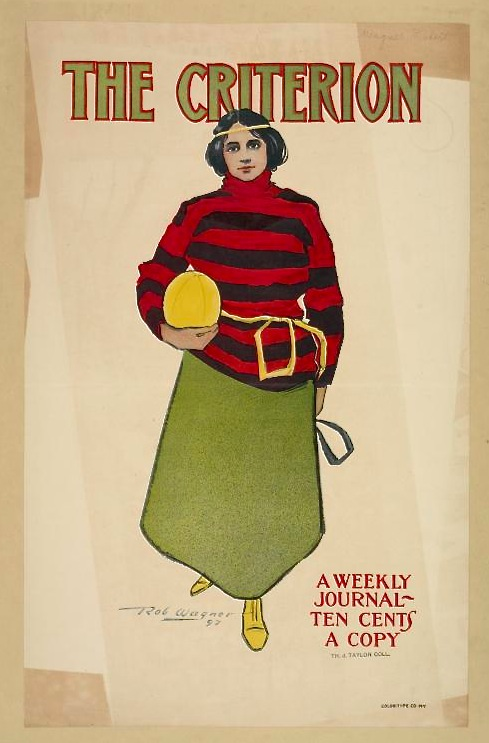

The Criterion was a New York-based literary magazine published as a weekly from 1896 to 1900, then a monthly until 1905. It featured bold illustrated covers, saucy cartoons and a mix of news and feature reporting and forward-thinking satire.

The magazine attracted a large number of artists and writers from a wide spectrum of political backgrounds. Staff included illustrator Rob Wagner, a socialist and later founder of Rob Wagner’s Script, a Hollywood literary magazine, the novelist Percival Pollard, and novelist, playwright and future film director Rupert Hughes.

The Criterion originated as St. Louis Life, an offshoot of New York Life magazine. The two magazines shared editorial content until Grace L. Davidson purchased St. Louis Life in 1896 and changed the name to The Criterion. She ended the magazine's relationship with New York Life and began publishing original material. The following year Davidson appointed Henry Dumay as editor. Dumay urged Davidson to relocate the magazine to New York. She agreed and the September 25, 1897, issued debuted as a New York publication.

The Criterion proved instantly popular because it eschewed the typical arts and letters coverage with instead more provocative articles and illustrations. It was fun and high-spirited. Dumay soon recruited Pollard, Hughes, Vance Thompson, James L. Ford and Arthur Guitermann among many others to contribute to the magazine's editorial content.

Davidson fired Dumay in January 1898 after he penned a risqué piece of satire over the “little sanitary stops of a French dancer’s dog.” Hughes filled in as the interim editor until Davidson hired Joseph I. C. Clarke, an Irish Fenian revolutionary with a taste for pushing boundaries. Yet Clarke, who had worked for the New York Herald, knew his audience and understood Davidson's editorial direction and kept his youthful fervor in check.

Clarke recruited Rob Wagner, a graduate of the University of Michigan, who illustrated for The Wrinkle and The Clack Book and for the Detroit Free Press. Wagner used heavy reds and a poster-style technique on The Criterion's covers. His portrait of a young Theodore Roosevelt gained attention and was widely circulated. During the Spanish–American War, he spent a brief period in Cuba illustrating scenes.

The staff was ambitious, creating in 1898 The Criterion Theatre. The Criterion Theatre attracted New York's intellectual and artistic community. For many writers and artists, The Criterion Theatre served as a foundation for their embrace of socialism and left-leaning politics. Wagner, for example, cited his tenure at The Criterion for his exposure to progressive politics. He later illustrated and edited The Western Comrade and influenced Charlie Chaplin’s liberal politics. He also was an enthusiastic support of Upton Sinclair’s bid for California governor in 1934. The Criterion Theatre staged plays by Henrik Ibsen, Hermann Sundermann and Augustin Daly.

A wealthy St. Louis benefactor funded the magazine's operation at about $4,000 per month, but when Davidson could not turn a profit, the contributor stopped providing money. Davidson also attempted to bypass the American News Company's distribution network for American magazines by establishing her own operation. American News had a powerful and unforgiving monopoly on magazine distribution and Davidson lost thousands of dollars each month. Davidson then hired a distribution manager, but Clarke couldn't work with him. He resigned in 1900 and returned to the Herald. Davidson, without a strong editor, sold the magazine the same year.

The magazine continued as monthly until 1905 when it folded.
