= At the 'Cadian Ball =

1892 short story by Kate Chopin

- Short story by Kate Chopin

Publication
- Publication date: 1892

"At the 'Cadian Ball" is an 1892 short story written by American author Kate Chopin. Chopin's later story, "The Storm" (written 1898, but not published until 1969), is a sequel to this story. A distinctive feature of the short story is the use of local color.

== Plot summary ==
The 'Cadian Ball is a soirée for young Cajun people to find marriage suitors. Calixta is the belle of the ball and describes the young men as boring and plain looking. The only man she finds attractive is Alcée. They sneak off together and discuss their former relationship. Clarisse, whom Alcée was originally courting, had refused to accept him, but after seeing him leave for the ball, she follows and asks Alcée to come with her, claiming that something terrible has happened. After leading him away, she admits that nothing has happened, but that she is in love with him. However, Calixta ends up with Bobinôt, a man she is not very attracted to, but someone she will settle for.
