= The Storm (short story) =

- Short story by Kate Chopin
- Country: United States
- Genre: Romance

Publication
- Published in: The Complete Works of Kate Chopin
- Publisher: Louisiana State University Press
- Publication date: 1969

Chronology
| At the Cadian Ball | — |

"The Storm" is a short story written by the American writer Kate Chopin in 1898. The story takes place during the 19th century in the South of the United States, where storms are frequent and dangerous. It did not appear in print in Chopin's lifetime, but it was published in The Complete Works of Kate Chopin in 1969. This story is the sequel to Chopin's "At the 'Cadian Ball".

== Synopsis ==
Bobinôt and his four-year-old son Bibi are at Friedheimer's store when a violent storm begins. The two decide to remain at the store until the storm passes. Bobinôt decides to buy a can of shrimp for his wife, Calixta, while he waits with his son for the storm to abate.

Meanwhile, back at their house, Bobinôt's wife Calixta is so occupied with her sewing that at first she does not notice the incoming storm. Finally, she notices that it is growing darker outside, so she decides to shut the windows and retrieve Bobinôt's and Bibi's clothes, which are hanging outside. As she goes outside to retrieve the clothes, she notices Alcée, a former beau, who has ridden up to the house in the hopes of riding out the storm with her.

As the storm worsens, Alcée asks Calixta if he can come in until the storm is over; Calixta obliges. Alcée then helps Calixta get some clothes off the line. He is reluctant to come in and stays outside until it becomes apparent that the storm is not going to let up. Calixta gathers up the lengths of the cotton sheet she had been sewing while Alcée takes a seat in the rocker. Calixta goes over to the window and observes the intensity of the storm, which disturbs her so much she nearly falls. Alcée then attempts to comfort her, and in doing so, he is reminded of the passion they once felt for each other. Alcée reminds Calixta of their time at Assumption, when they kissed and kissed, and she immediately remembers. At first, Calixta is standoffish when Alcée tries to comfort her, but she can't resist him as she becomes overwhelmed with passion. As the storm increases in intensity, so does the passion of the two former lovers. The sexual encounter between the pair ends at the same time as the storm. Alcée and Calixta go their separate ways once more, and they are both happy.

Bobinôt and Bibi return from the grocery store, and Calixta immediately embraces them. However, they are expecting a more intimidating approach from Calixta, considering how dirty Bibi is from their journey home. Bobinôt presents his gift of the can of shrimp to his wife, and she remarks that they will feast that night. Meanwhile, Alcée writes a loving letter to his wife Clarisse encouraging her to stay in Biloxi with their children as long as she needs. He notes that her well-being is more important than the anxiety from the separation that he endures. Clarisse is charmed by the letter, and she is happy in Biloxi because she feels free as if she were a maiden again. Although she is devoted to her husband, she isn't in a rush to go back to her married life. The story ends with the short line "So the storm passed and every one was happy".

== Characters ==
- Calixta: The wife of Bobinôt and the mother of Bibi. In the story, she has an affair with Alcée, a former lover, and is now married
- Bobinôt: The husband of Calixta and the father of Bibi, who are separated for the majority of the story
- Bibi: The four-year-old son of Calixta and Bobinôt
- Alcée: The husband of Clarisse and was Calixta's former beau. He has an affair with Calixta in the story
- Clarisse: Alcée's wife, who is away with their children at Biloxi

== Analysis ==
"The Storm" can be interpreted as a story of sexual desire, a topic not publicly discussed in the 19th century, written in a third-person omniscient point of view. The relationship between Calixta and Alcée holds a degree of passion that is absent from both of their marriages. Calixta is scared of the storm, but Alcée's calmness relaxes her. Alcée embraces her after a lightning strike hits a chinaberry tree, rekindling the lust she once had for Alcée: "A bolt struck a tall chinaberry tree at the edge of the field. It filled all visible space with a blinding glare and the crash seemed to invade the very boards they stood upon." Calixta's sexual desire seems to be directly tied to the storm.

Throughout the story, there is no bias from the narrator. This is an effective way to provide a completely open interpretation of the morality of the characters' actions. This choice is interesting, as it can be said that the emphasis of this story rests less on the ethics of the affair and more on the simple present actions. Had the narrator shown a judgment, the audience may interpret the entire story in a different light.

In the article, "The Kaleidoscope of Truth: A New Look at Chopin's 'The Storm'", Allen Stein explains how some people believe that Chopin supports and defends Calixta's affair as an act of human nature; that women deserve to fulfill their sexual desires.

Another thing to look at is how "everyone was happy" after the affair, which can suggest the affair was a good thing. The story gives the impression that before the storm, Calixta was lacking excitement from her marriage, but after the passionate reconnection with Alcée, everything is better than before despite her adulterous acts.

== Symbolism ==
"The Storm" is a short story that takes place during the 19th century. Chopin's protagonist Calixta is portrayed as the typical housewife, as she is sewing and tending to Bobinôt and Bibi's clothes. Throughout the story, there are many symbolic references. While many claim that the antagonist of the story is the storm itself, it is widely accepted that the storm symbolizes the passion and affair between Calixta and Alcée. As soon as Calixta goes outside to get Bibi and Bobinôt's clothes off the line and the storm approaches, so does Alcée seeking shelter from the storm." The end of the storm specifically leaves the status of the affair between Calixta and Alcée open-ended as Alcée takes an extended stay of absence from his wife to be in closer proximity to Calixta after the events of the night. At the end of the storm, the narrator says: "the storm passed and everyone was happy." They both experience an intense passion that their relationships were missing.

Flowers are also a form of symbolism in the story. Chopin uses calyx to create Calixta's name as a metaphor to explain the protective barrier Calixta has for herself in Assumption. Later, when Alcee came, Calixta opened herself up to Alcee like a flower. The flower in the story also represents the relationship between nature and human desire. Alcee enters Calixta's home during the rainstorm, which symbolizes Alcee as the "rain" that Calixta, the flower, requires for growth. Chopin uses similes to describe Alcee's views of Calixta's skin as "a creamy lily that the sun invites" to show that she has matured over time and is opening up to Alcee as a flower would.

White is also used throughout the story to describe Calixta's skin and her bed, symbolizing both innocence and purity. Although Calixta is described as innocent throughout the story, she and Alcée still have a sexual encounter. Calixta's body "know[s] for the first time its birthright," meaning that even though she is married and has a child, she is obviously not innocent but she is now aware of the pleasure that her body can achieve with a different man. Also, the bed, which is shown to be white, symbolizes Calixta's innocence as the place where she expresses her passion. By stating how "the storm passed and everyone was happy" at the end of the story, it signifies how the affair is not viewed as negative. This is somewhat at odds with how adulterers are viewed in general. Being that she is described this way, it can be inferred that Chopin does not necessarily shine a negative light on adulterers. The affair is made to seem natural, which can also symbolize how the structure and confines of marriage can be unnatural.

== Critical response ==
Many critics have argued that "The Storm" narrows in on the topics of gender, and some view it as a sin committed between two "ex" lovers. As Maria Herbert-Leiter suggested, "through this story, Chopin seems to be arguing for human passion and desire, but not at the cost of marriage. After all, the two couples end where they began—happily married. Furthermore, Calixta's concerns for Bobinôt's physical dryness and Clarisse's continued devotion to her husband, prove the solidity of their marriages that are tested within the story."

In his book Women and Autonomy, critic Allen Stein stated that "From the first chapter to last, 'The Storm,' is pervaded by ambiguity. The plot is clear enough, but the story is missing important details relating to the setting. That within the compass of the story's five chapters Chopin offers, to varying degrees, the points of view of five different characters suggesting no implicit consensus of vision but only a sense of fragmentation. A sense perhaps that with any significant situation points of view are as numerous as those involved and, further, that with many pieces of significant fiction readings are as numerous as readers."

== Other versions ==
In 2009, John Berardo directed a short film adaptation of the story, produced by Major Diamond Productions.
