= Emily Toth =

American academic and writer

Emily Toth, a Robert Penn Warren Professor of English and Women's Studies at Louisiana State University in Baton Rouge, is a scholar, novelist, advice columnist, and feminist activist. She earned her PhD from Johns Hopkins University. Toth's scholarly work includes over 300 articles and papers about academic mentoring, Louisiana literature and culture, women's humor, and music; biographies of the American women writers Kate Chopin and Grace Metalious; a cultural history of menstruation; edited collections of Kate Chopin's papers and last short story collection, and a volume of essays about regionalism in women's writing. Toth's historical novel Daughters of New Orleans (1983) was named a "Best Feminist Historical Novel" by Romantic Times in 1984. Toth was also the founder and editor of the journal Regionalism and the Female Imagination (formerly The Kate Chopin Newsletter) from 1975-1979 and on the editorial board of the journal Southern Studies.

== Activism ==
Since 1977, Toth has been an associate of the Women's Institute for Freedom of the Press (WIFP), an American nonprofit publishing organization that works to increase communication between women and connect the public with women-based media.

== Books ==
- Ms. Mentor's New and Ever More Impeccable Advice for Women and Men in Academia. University of Pennsylvania Press. 2008. Archived from the original on June 13, 2008.
- Inside Peyton Place: the Life of Grace Metalious. Jackson: University Press of Mississippi, 2000, updated from 1981. Sold to Fox 2000 and Sandra Bullock for the film, Grace and Kitty.
- Unveiling Kate Chopin Jackson: University Press of Mississippi, 1999. Published for the centennial of Chopin's The Awakening.
- Kate Chopin's Private Papers(edited with Per Seyersted and Cheyenne Bonnell). Bloomington: Indiana University Press, 1998.
- Ms. Mentor's Impeccable Advice for Women in Academia (3rd ed.). University of Pennsylvania Press. 1997. Archived from the original on March 11, 2000.
- Kate Chopin (biography). New York: William Morrow, 1990. Paperback: Austin: Univ. of Texas, 1993. Nominated for a Pulitzer Prize.*
- A Vocation and a Voice (edition of Kate Chopin's last story collection). New York: Penguin Classics, 1991.
- The Curse: a Cultural History of Menstruation. With Janice Delaney and Mary Jane Lupton. Urbana: University of Illinois, 1976. Updated edition, 1988.
- Regionalism and the Female Imagination (edited essays). New York: Human Sciences Press, 1985.
- Daughters of New Orleans (historical novel). New York: Bantam, 1983. Named one of three "Best Feminist Historical Novels" by Romantic Times (Fall, 1984).*
- A Kate Chopin Miscellany (letters, diaries, essays). Associate editor, with Per Seyersted. Natchitoches, LA: Northwestern State University Press and Oslo, Norway: Universitetsforlaget, 1979.

== Other writings ==
Toth wrote the monthly advice column Ms. Mentor, a monthly column for the Career Network in The Chronicle of Higher Education from 1998 to 2017. For her work as Ms. Mentor, Toth was named one of "The Net's Hottest Columnists" by Content Spotlight (June 19, 2000). The best of Toth's Ms. Mentor column is collected in Ms. Mentor's Impeccable Advice for Women in Academia (now in its third printing) and Ms. Mentor's New and Ever More Impeccable Advice for Women and Men in Academia , both published by the University of Pennsylvania Press.

Toth has published over 300 articles, reviews, and columns about women writers and popular and regional culture in academic and literary journals including The Massachusetts Review, The Women's Review of Books, The Southern Review, The Southern Quarterly, Southern Studies, and The Journal of American Culture), and in popular periodicals including Ms., USA Today, The Washington Post Book World, and The Times-Picayune (New Orleans). Toth has also presented her work at over 300 conferences in six countries.

=== Scholarly articles ===
- Toth, Emily (1990). "Developing Political Savvy- Many Misadventures Later". Women's Studies Quarterly. 18 (3/4): 147–152. JSTOR 40003184.
- Toth, Emily (1981). "Female Wits". The Massachusetts Review. 22 (4): 783–793. JSTOR 25089227.
- Toth, Emily (1985). "Forbidden Jokes and Naughty Ladies". Studies in American Humor. 4 (1/2): 7–17. JSTOR 42573207.
- Toth, Emily (1975). "The Independent Woman and "Free" Love". The Massachusetts Review. 16 (4): 647–664. JSTOR 25088592.
- Toth, Emily (1991). "Kate Chopin on Divine Love and Suicide: Two Rediscovered Articles". American Literature. 63 (1): 115–121. doi:10.2307/2926566. JSTOR 2926566.

=== Other ===
- Toth, Emily (1992). "Aborting Operation Rescue: We Did It and So can You". Off Our Backs. 22 (9): 11–18. JSTOR 20834224.
- Toth, Emily (2002). "Common-Sense Columnist: Ann Landers Taught Self-Respect to Generations of Women". The Women's Review of Books. 19 (12): 6–7. doi:10.2307/4024053. JSTOR 4024053.
- Toth, Emily (1985). "CRISIS ALERT: Kate Chopin House in St. Louis". Legacy. 2 (1): 13. JSTOR 25678924.
- Toth, Emily (1999). "Emily Toth Thanks Kate Chopin". The Women's Review of Books. 16 (10/11): 34. doi:10.2307/4023250. JSTOR 4023250.
- Toth, Emily; Kerbs, Paula (2008). "Ms. Mentor Unmasked". Academe. 94 (1): 30–33. JSTOR 40253611.
- “Nice Protestant Girl Dispenses Advice? Oy Vey!, A.” USA Today. 30 July 2003. 13.
- Toth, Emily (1982). "Students don't know they're oppressed". Off Our Backs. 12 (5): 3–4. JSTOR 25774425.
- “A Woman's Place Is Everyplace...” The Women's Review of Books, vol. 7, no. 5, 1990. 28.
- “Women's Studies.” Off Our Backs, vol. 7, no. 2, 1977. 23.

=== Book reviews ===
- “Absolutely Flabulous: Fat! So? by Marilyn Wann, Radiance: The Magazine for Large Women edited by Alice Ansfield, and Mode Magazine edited by Corynne Corbett.” Women's Review of Books, Jan 2001, Vol. 18, Issue 4. 19.
- “Bringing up Billy: Leading with My Heart: My Life by Virginia Kelley and James Morgan.” The Women's Review of Books, vol. 12, no. 1, 1994, 27.
- “Review of The Belle Gone Bad: White Southern Women Writers and the Dark Seductress by Betina Entzminger.” South Central Review, vol. 22, no. 1, 2005, 120–122.
- “Collections: Four by Susan Koppelman.” Off Our Backs, vol. 17, no. 4, 1987. 19.
- “Cosmo vs. Ms.: Bad Girls Go Everywhere: The Life of Helen Gurly Brown by Jennifer Scanlon.” Women's Review of Books. Jan/Feb 2010, Vol. 27, Issue 1. 26-27.
- “Country Queens: Patsy: The Life and Times of Patsy Cline by Margaret Jones and Dolly: My Life and Other Unfinished Business by Dolly Parton” The Women's Review of Books, vol. 12, no. 6, 1995. 24–25.
- “Dishing with the Girls, Oops, the Women: Our Bodies, Ourselves: Menopause by The Boston Women's Health Book Collective and I Feel Bad about My Neck, and Other Thoughts about Being a Woman by Nora Ephron.” The Women's Review of Books, vol. 24, no. 2, 2007. 16–18.
- “Fantasy Lives: Deep in the Heart of Texas: Reflections of Former Dallas Cowboys Cheerleaders by Suzette Scholz, Stephanie Scholz, Sheri Scholz, and John Tullius, The Vanderbilt Women: Dynasty of Wealth, Glamour, and Tragedy by Clarice Stasz, and Me: Stories of My Life by Katharine Hepburn” The Women's Review of Books, vol. 9, no. 6, 1992. 19–20.
- “Grade: Incomplete: Forgotten Promise: Race and Gender Wars on a Small College Campus by Gretchen von Loewe Kreuter and Antifeminism in the Academy by VèVè Clark et al.” The Women's Review of Books, vol. 14, no. 2, 1996. 18–19.
- “Gumbo for the Soul: Swamp Songs: The Making of an Unruly Woman by Sheryl St. Germain.” The Women's Review of Books. Vol XX, No. 8. May 2003. 17.
- “Help Is at Hand: Free Advice, by the Advice Ladies, How to Succeed in Business without a Penis: Secrets and Strategies for the Working Woman by Karen Salmansohn, Miss Manners Rescues Civilization from Sexual Harassment, Frivolous Lawsuits, Dissing and Other Lapses in Civility by Judith Martin, and Wake up and Smell the Coffee! Advice, Wisdom, and Uncommon Good Sense by Ann Landers.” The Women's Review of Books, vol. 14, no. 4, 1997. 11–12.
- “In Tune with Billie: If You Can't Be Free, Be a Mystery: In Search of Billie Holiday by Farah Jasmine Griffin.” Women's Review of Books. Oct 2001, Vol. 19, Issue 1. 6.
- “It Changed Their Lives: Juggling: A Memoir of Work, Family, and Feminism by Jane S. Gould and Fields of Play: Constructing an Academic Life by Laurel Richardson.” The Women's Review of Books, vol. 15, no. 6, 1998. 10–11.
- “Jamming the Wind: Bike Lust: Harleys, Women, and American Society by Barbara Joans.” Women's Review of Books. June 2002, Vol. 19 Issue 9. 18.
- “Labors of Love: Dangerous Men and Adventurous Women: Romance Writers on the Appeal of the Romance by Jayne Ann Krentz.” The Women's Review of Books, vol. 10, no. 4, 1993. 10–11.
- “Larger than Life: Texas Guinan: Queen of the Night Clubs by Louise Berliner.” The Women's Review of Books, vol. 11, no. 3, 1993. 28–29.
- “Making Crime Pay: Swindler, Spy, Rebel: The Confidence Woman in Nineteenth-Century America by Kathleen De Grave.” The Women's Review of Books, vol. 13, no. 5, 1996. 7–8.
- “Meow Mix: The Cat Book of Virtues: A Collection of Stories for the Noble Cat by Susan Beske Wallace, Sasha's Tail: Lessons from a Life with Cats by Jacqueline Damian, Why Cats Paint: A Theory of Feline Aesthetics by Heather Busch and Burton Silver, and Poetry for Cats: The Definitive Anthology of Distinguished Feline Verse by Henry Beard.” The Women's Review of Books, vol. 12, no. 10/11, 1995. 35–36
- “Modern Couple: American Dreamers: The Story of Charmian and Jack London by Clarice Stasz, A.” The Women's Review of Books, vol. 6, no. 9, 1989. 24.
- “Never a Dull Moment: Nobody Said Not to Go: The Life, Loves, and Adventures of Emily Hahn by Ken Cuthbertson.” The Women's Review of Books, vol. 16, no. 1, 1998. 10.
- “On the Screen Where You Live: Katie.com by Katherine Tarbox.” Women's Review of Books. Oct 2000. Vol. 18, Issue 1. 4.
- “Personification of Pluck, The: Nellie Bly: Daredevil, Reporter, Feminist by Brooke Kroeger.” The Women's Review of Books, vol. 11, no. 9, 1994. 9–10.
- “Price of Success: Dancing in the Street: Confessions of a Motown Diva by Martha Reeves and Mark Bego and Reba: My Story by Reba McEntire and Tom Carter, The” The Women's Review of Books, vol. 12, no. 3, 1994. 25–26.
- “Profiting from Loss: Losing It: America's Obsession with Weight and the Industry That Feeds on It by Laura Fraser.” The Women's Review of Books, vol. 15, no. 1, 1997. 21.
- “Review of Around 1981: Academic Feminist Literary Theory by Jane Gallop.” NWSA Journal, vol. 5, no. 2, 1993. 283–285.
- “Review of Ellen Glasgow and a Woman's Traditions by Pamela R. Matthews.” South Central Review, vol. 14, no. 3/4, 1997. pp. 117–118.
- “Review of Literary New Orleans: Essays and Meditations by Richard S. Kennedy.” South Central Review, vol. 10, no. 4, 1993. 93–94.
- “Review of The Erotics of Instruction by Regina Barreca and Deborah Denenholz Morse and Feminist Accused of Sexual Harassment by Jane Gallop.” NWSA Journal, vol. 11, no. 1, 1999. 193–96.
- “Review of The Family Track: Keeping Your Faculties while You Mentor, Nurture, Teach, and Serve by Constance Coiner and Diana Hume George.” South Central Review, vol. 16, no. 1, 1999. 111–13.
- “Review of Myths of Coeducation: Selected Essays, 1964-1983 by Florence Howe.” The Centennial Review, vol. 29, no. 4, 1985. 484–85.
- “Review of Love and Ideology in the Afternoon: Soap Opera, Women, and Television Genre by Laura Stempel Mumford.” Journal of American Culture. Spring 99, Vol. 22 Issue 1. 110-11.
- “Review of Katherine Anne Porter: A Sense of the Times by Janis P. Stout.” Studies in the Novel, vol. 29, no. 2, 1997. 260–62.
- “Sex after 40: A Round-Heeled Woman: My Late-Life Adventures in Sex and Romance by Jane Juska and Sexual Healing by Jill Nelson.” The Women's Review of Books, vol. 20, no. 12, 2003. 9–10.
- “Sharing Stories, Sharing Lives: Interpreting Women's Lives: Feminist Theory and Personal Narratives by the Personal Narratives Group.” The Women's Review of Books, vol. 7, no. 2, 1989. 21–22.
- “Sharpening Her Claws: Not Much Fun: The Lost Poems of Dorothy Parker by Dorothy Parker, Stuart Y. Silverstein” The Women's Review of Books, vol. 13, no. 12, 1996. 12–13.
- “Smart Woman, Foolish Choices: Dorothy Parker: What Fresh Hell Is This? by Marion Meade.” The Women's Review of Books, vol. 5, no. 8, 1988. 4–5.
- “Smelling the Coffee: America's Mom: The Life, Lessons, and Legacy of Ann Landers by Rick Kogan and A Life in Letters: Ann Landers' Letters to Her Only Child by Margo Howard.” The Women's Review of Books, vol. 21, no. 10/11, 2004. 8–9.
- “That Saved a Kvetch Like Me: Bluebird: Women and the New Psychology of Happiness by Ariel Gore and Bright-Sided: How the Relentless Promotion of Positive Thinking Has Undermined America by Barbara Ehrenreich.” The Women's Review of Books, vol. 27, no. 6, 2010. 24–25.
- “Two Sexperts: Bachelors and Bunnies: The Sexual Politics of Playboy by Carrie Pitzulo and Big Sex Little Death: A Memoir by Susie Bright” The Women's Review of Books, vol. 28, no. 6, 2011. 25–26.
- “Unruly Women: Louisa May Alcott: A Personal Biography by Susan Cheever and Jane Addams: Spirit in Action by Louise W. Knight” The Women's Review of Books, vol. 28, no. 3, 2011. 28–30.
- “Vice without Spice: Storyville by Lois Battle.” The Women's Review of Books, vol. 10, no. 9, 1993. 19.
- “Questioning the Quest: The Truth about Lorin Jones by Alison Lurie and Writing a Woman's Life by Carolyn G. Heilbrun.” The Women's Review of Books, vol. 6, no. 5, 1989. 11.
- “Way We Were: Pink Think: Becoming a Woman in Many Uneasy Lessons by Lynn Peril, The.” The Women's Review of Books, vol. 20, no. 4, 2003. 13–14.
- “What We Talk about When We Talk about . . . : One for the Girls! The Pleasures and Practices of Reading Women's Porn by Clarissa Smith, Getting off: Pornography and the End of Masculinity by Robert Jensen, and Bonk: The Curious Coupling of Science and Sex by Mary Roach” The Women's Review of Books, vol. 25, no. 5, 2008. 25–26.
- “Which One Would You Be?: Dreaming in French: The Paris Years of Jacqueline Bouvier Kennedy, Susan Sontag, and Angela Davis by Alice Kaplan, Anonymous in Their Own Names: Doris E. Fleischman, Ruth Hale, and Jane Grant by Susan Henry and All We Know: Three Lives by Lisa Cohen.” The Women's Review of Books, vol. 30, no. 2, 2013. 27–29.
- “Who'll Take Romance?: How to Write a Romance and Get It Published by Kathryn Falk, How to Write Romance Novels That Sell by Marilyn M. Lowery, Love Lines: The Romance Reader's Guide to Printed Pleasures by Rosemary Guiley, Loving with a Vengeance: Mass Produced Fantasies for Women by Tania Modleski, and Writing Romance Fiction for Love and Money by Helene Schellenberg Barnhart.” The Women's Review of Books, vol. 1, no. 5, 1984. 12–13.
- “Who's Wearing the Pants?: When Everything Changed: The Amazing Journey of American Women from 1960 to the Present by Gail Collins.” The Women's Review of Books, vol. 27, no. 4, 2010. 28–30.
- “Writers' Wrongs: Doing Literary Business: American Women Writers in the Nineteenth Century by Susan Coultrap-McQuin and Jean Stafford: The Savage Heart by Charlotte Margolis Goodman.” The Women's Review of Books, vol. 8, no. 3, 1990. 15–16.

== Awards and recognitions ==
During her time at Louisiana State University and Penn State, Toth received various teaching and scholarship awards and was recognized for her pioneering work in popular culture by the Popular Culture Association. She has also been the recipient of 12 local and national grants and has appeared in four documentary films.

=== Awards ===
- Distinguished Faculty Award, Louisiana State University, 2001
- Robert Penn Warren Professor, Louisiana State University 2000-04
- Outstanding Faculty Achievement Award, Women's & Gender Studies, Louisiana State University 1998
- "Emily Toth Award," inaugurated 1986 by the American and Popular Culture Associations for best full-length book in women's studies and popular culture
- "Pioneer of Popular Culture" Award for Outstanding Contribution to American and Popular Culture Studies, American Culture Association's Governing Board, 2000
- Bartholome Lifetime Achievement Award, Popular Culture Association, 2019

=== Grants ===
- National Endowment for the Humanities grant
- Louisiana Endowment for the Humanities grant

=== Film appearances ===
- Back Story: Peyton Place Michele Farinola and Mimi Freedman, Dirs. AMC, 2001*
- Kate Chopin: A Re-Awakening Tika Laudun, Dir. Louisiana Public Broadcasting, 1998 *
- The Fifties Tracy Dahlby, Alex Gibney, and Susan Motamed, Dirs. The History Channel, 1997. Based on David Halberstam's 1994 book, The Fifties.*
- "Haunted Waters, Fragile Lands: Oh, What Tales to Tell!" Glen Pitre, Dir. Louisiana Public Broadcasting, 1994
