= University Press of Southern Denmark =

- Parent company: University of Southern Denmark
- Predecessor: Odense University Press
- Founded: 1966
- Country of origin: Denmark
- Headquarters location: Odense
- Publication types: Books, periodicals
- Official website: www.universitypress.dk

University Press of Southern Denmark (Danish: Syddansk Universitetsforlag) is Denmark's largest university press and was founded in 1966 as Odense University Press (Odense Universitetsforlag). The press publishes books from the world of science in the broadest sense of the word. Its authors are mainly academics from the University of Southern Denmark and from Denmark's other centres of higher education. The University Press of Southern Denmark also publishes a wide range of textbooks and teaching materials, as well as periodicals.
