= The Awakening (Chopin novel) =

1899 novel by Kate Chopin

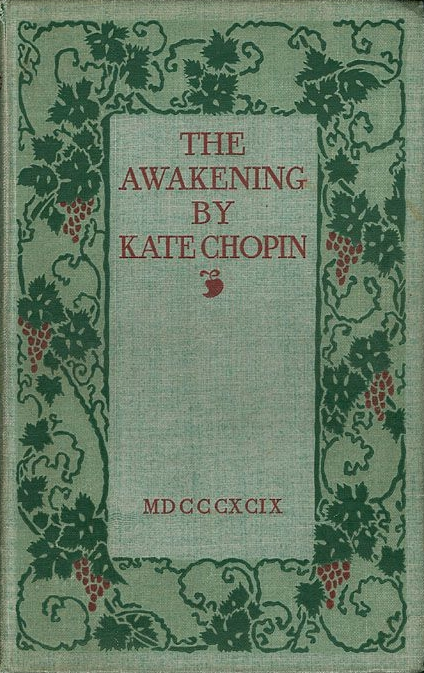
- Cover of the first edition
- Author: Kate Chopin
- Working title: A Solitary Soul
- Language: English
- Genre: Feminist literature
- Set in: New Orleans and Louisiana Gulf coast, 1890s
- Publisher: Herbert S. Stone & Co.
- Publication date: April 22, 1899
- Publication place: Chicago, Illinois, and New York City, New York, United States
- Media type: Print: hardcover
- Pages: 303
- OCLC: 1420631
- Dewey Decimal: 813.4
- LC Class: PS1294.C63 A64 1899
- Text: The Awakening at Wikisource

The Awakening is a novel by Kate Chopin, first published on 22 April 1899. Set in New Orleans and on the Louisiana Gulf coast at the end of the 19th century, the plot centers on Edna Pontellier and her struggle between her increasingly unorthodox views on femininity and motherhood with the prevailing social attitudes of the turn-of-the-century American South. It is one of the earlier American novels that focuses on women's issues utilizing narrative techniques. It is also widely seen as a landmark work of early feminism, generating a mixed reaction from contemporary readers and critics.

The book may be considered as being aligned with the nineteenth-century female traditions of writing, in particular the Anglo-American New Woman fiction. The novel's blend of realistic narrative, incisive social commentary, and psychological complexity makes The Awakening a precursor of American modernist literature; it prefigures the works of American novelists such as William Faulkner and Ernest Hemingway and echoes the works of contemporaries such as Edith Wharton and Henry James. It can also be considered among the first Southern works in a tradition that would culminate with the modern works of Faulkner, Flannery O'Connor, Eudora Welty, Katherine Anne Porter, and Tennessee Williams.

== Summary ==
The novel opens with the Pontellier family—Léonce, a New Orleans businessman of French Louisiana Creole heritage; his wife Edna; and their sons Etienne and Raoul as they take a vacation on Grand Isle at a resort on the Gulf of Mexico managed by Madame Lebrun and her sons Robert and Victor.

Edna spends a lot of her time with her close friend Adèle Ratignolle, who cheerily and boisterously reminds Edna of her duties as a wife and mother. At Grand Isle, Edna eventually forms a connection with Robert Lebrun, a charming, earnest young man who actively seeks Edna's attention and affections. When they fall in love, Robert senses the doomed nature of such a relationship and flees to Mexico under the guise of pursuing a nameless business venture. The narrative focus moves to Edna's shifting emotions as she reconciles her maternal duties with her desire for social freedom and for Robert.

When summer vacation ends, the Pontelliers return to New Orleans. Edna gradually reassesses her priorities and takes an active role in her own happiness. She starts to isolate herself from New Orleans society and to withdraw from some of the duties traditionally associated with motherhood. Léonce eventually talks to a doctor about diagnosing his wife, fearing she is losing her mental faculties. The doctor advises Léonce to let her be and assures him that things will return to normal.

When Léonce prepares to travel to New York City on business, he sends the boys to his mother. Being left home alone for an extended period gives Edna physical and emotional room to breathe and reflect on various aspects of her life. While her husband is still away, she moves out of their home and into a small bungalow nearby and begins a dalliance with Alcée Arobin, a persistent suitor with a reputation for being free with his affections. Edna is shown as a sexual being for the first time in the novel, but the affair proves awkward and emotionally fraught.

Edna also reaches out to Mademoiselle Reisz, a gifted pianist whose playing is renowned but who maintains a generally hermetic existence. Her playing had moved Edna profoundly earlier in the novel. Reisz focuses her life on music and herself instead of on society's expectations, acting as a foil to Adèle Ratignolle, who encourages Edna to conform. Reisz is in contact with Robert while he is in Mexico, receiving letters from him regularly. Edna begs Reisz to reveal their contents, which she does, proving to Edna that Robert is thinking about her.

Eventually, Robert returns to New Orleans. At first aloof (and finding excuses not to be near Edna), he eventually confesses his passionate love for her. He admits that the business trip to Mexico was an excuse to escape a relationship that never could work.

Edna is called away to help Adèle with a difficult childbirth. Adèle pleads with Edna to think about her children and what she would be forgoing if she did not behave appropriately. When Edna returns home, she finds a note from Robert stating that he has left forever because he loves her too much to shame her by engaging in a relationship with a married woman.

In devastated shock, Edna rushes back to Grand Isle, where she had first met Robert Lebrun. Edna seeks escape by committing suicide, drowning herself in the waters of the Gulf of Mexico.

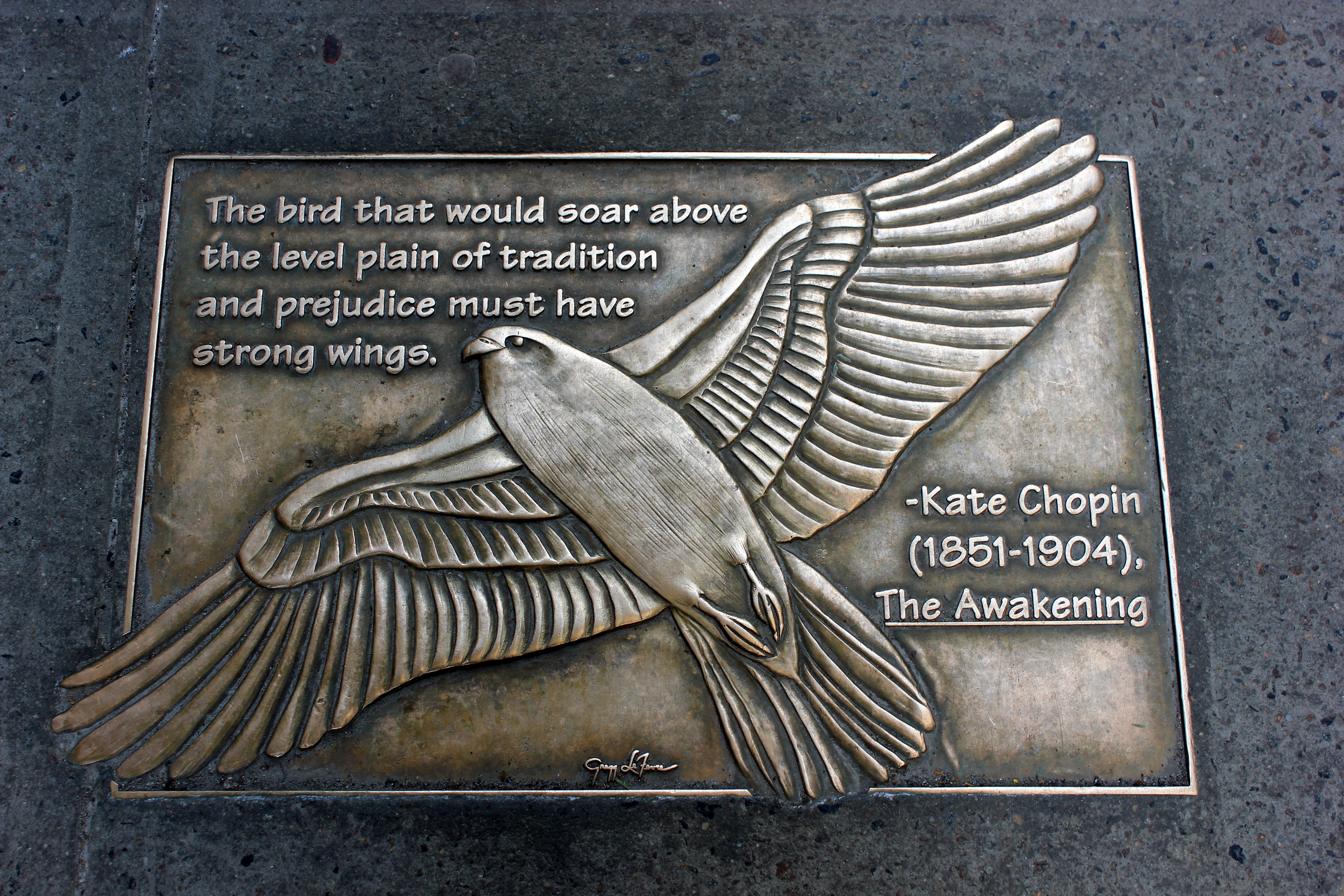
Kate Chopin plaque, New York City library walk: "The bird that would soar above the level plain of tradition and prejudice must have strong wings."

== Main characters ==
- Edna Pontellier [ɛdna pɔ̃tɛlje] – a respectable Presbyterian from Kentucky, living in Creole society in Louisiana. She rebels against conventional expectations and discovers an identity independent from her role as a wife and mother.
- Léonce Pontellier [leɔ̃s pɔ̃tɛlje] – Edna's husband, a successful businessman who is oblivious to his wife's unhappiness.
- Mademoiselle Reisz [madmwazɛl ʁajs] – Her character symbolizes what Edna could have been if she had grown old and had been independent from her family. Despite viewing Reisz as disagreeable, Edna sees her as an inspiration to her own "awakening."
- Madame Adèle Ratignolle [adɛl ʁatiɲɔl] – Edna's friend, who represents the 19th-century woman as she is totally devoted to her husband and children.
- Alcée Arobin [alse aʁɔbɛ̃] – known for seducing married women, he pursues a short-lived affair with Edna, satisfying her while her husband is away.
- Robert Lebrun [ʁɔbɛʁ ləbʁœ̃] – has a history of charming women he cannot have but finds something different with Edna and falls in love. Robert's flirting with Edna catalyzes her "awakening", and she sees in him what has been missing in her marriage.

== Style ==
Kate Chopin's narrative style in The Awakening can be categorized as naturalism. Chopin's novel bears the hallmarks of French short story writer Guy de Maupassant's style: a perceptive focus on human behavior and the complexities of social structures. This demonstrates Chopin's admiration for Maupassant, yet another example of the enormous influence Maupassant exercised on 19th-century literary realism.

However, Chopin's style could more accurately be described as a hybrid that captures contemporary narrative currents and looks forward to various trends in Southern and European literature.

Mixed into Chopin's overarching 19th-century realism is an incisive and often humorous skewering of upper-class pretension, reminiscent of contemporaries such as Oscar Wilde, Henry James, Edith Wharton, and George Bernard Shaw.

Also evident in The Awakening is the future of the Southern novel as a distinct genre, not only in setting and subject matter but in narrative style. Chopin's lyrical portrayal of her protagonist's shifting emotions is a narrative technique that Faulkner would expand in novels like Absalom, Absalom! and The Sound and the Fury. Chopin portrays her experiences of the Creole lifestyle, in which women were under strict rules and limited to the role of wife and mother, which influenced her "local color" fiction and focus on the Creole culture. Chopin adopted this style in her early short stories and her first novel At Fault, which also deals with some of the issues of Creole lifestyle. By using characters of French descent, she was able to get away with publishing these stories because the characters were viewed as "foreign", without her readers being as shocked as they were when Edna Pontellier, a white Protestant, strays from the expectations of society.

The plot anticipated the stories of Eudora Welty and Flannery O'Connor and the plays of William Inge, and Edna Pontellier's emotional crises and her eventual tragic fall look ahead to the complex female characters of Tennessee Williams's plays. Chopin's life, particularly in terms of having her own sense of identity—aside from men and her children—inspired The Awakening. Her upbringing also shaped her views as she lived with her widowed mother, grandmother and great-grandmother, all of whom were intellectual, independent women. After her father was killed on All Saints' Day and her brother died from typhoid on Mardi Gras, Chopin became skeptical of religion, a view that she presents through Edna, who finds church "suffocating". Being widowed and left with six children to look after influenced Chopin's writing, which she began at this time. Emily Toth argues against the view that Chopin was ostracized from St. Louis after the publication of The Awakening, stating that many St. Louis women praised her; male critics condemned her novel.

Aspects of Chopin's style also prefigure the intensely lyrical and experimental style of novelists such as Virginia Woolf and the unsentimental focus on female intellectual and emotional growth in the novels of Sigrid Undset and Doris Lessing. Chopin's most important stylistic legacy is the detachment of the narrator.

== Themes ==
=== Solitude ===
One of the more prominent themes in The Awakening is solitude. As noted previously, Chopin's work was originally called A Solitary Soul.

Through Edna Pontellier's journey, Chopin sought to highlight the different ways that a woman could be in solitude because of the expectations of motherhood, ethnicity, marriage, social norms, and gender. Chopin presents Edna's autonomous separation from society and friends as individually empowering while still examining the risks of self-exploration and subsequent loneliness. In an attempt to shed her societal role of mother and wife, Edna takes charge of her limited life and makes changes to better discover her true self. For example, Edna leaves her husband and moves into a new house to live by herself, a controversial action because a true woman never would leave her husband. Although Edna's journey ultimately leads to an unsustainable solitude due to lack of societal support, "her death indicates self-possession rather than a retreat from a dilemma." She takes control over what she still has agency over: her body and her self.

By making Edna's experiences critically central to the novel, Chopin is able to sound a cautionary note about society's capacity to support women's liberation. As shown through Edna's depressing emotional journey, isolation, and eventual suicide, Chopin claims that the social norms and traditional gender roles of the 19th century could not tolerate an independent woman. The novel questions the value of solitude and autonomy within a society unable to positively sustain women's freedom.

=== Gender roles and social constraints ===
The themes of romance and death in The Awakening aid Chopin's feminist intent of illuminating the restrictive and oppressive roles of women in Victorian society. Edna's longing for Robert Lebrun and affair with Alcée Arobin explicitly show Edna's rejection of her prescribed roles as housewife and mother as she awakens to her sexuality and sense of self. Edna has an emotional affair with Robert, who leaves in order to avoid shaming her in society. Afterward, Edna has a physical affair with Alcée. Through these affairs, Edna exercises power outside of her marriage and experiences sexual longing for the first time. However, through these affairs Edna also discovers that no matter which man she is with, there is no escape from the general oppression women face; Edna's society has no place for a woman like her, as she must either be an exemplary housewife and mother like Adèle Ratignolle or an isolated outsider like Reisz.

Edna's suicide at the end of the novel exemplifies how few options women had in society at this time. Leaving society altogether was Edna's way of rejecting and escaping this oppressive dichotomy. One critic stated that the book leaves one sick of human nature, and another one stated that the book is morbid because it is about an unholy love that tested traditional gender roles of the late 1800s and that the book belongs to the overworked field of sex fiction. When the book was re-evaluated years later, it was considered a canonical contribution to feminist literature. This later view resulted in many other women writers of the 19th being re-evaluated.

=== Romantic music ===
Reisz fosters Edna's appreciation for music and art. Her performance of composer Frédéric Chopin's music (no relation to the author) moves Edna at the Grand Isle ball with Robert. The music's emotional lability, scholar Nicole Camastra writes, cannot fully explain Edna's:

[That] would deny [her] agency ... and misrepresent the synthesis of artistic form and content [mirrored in] Edna's experiences. Chopin's music ... integrates ... "the 'classical' concern for form and the 'romantic' urge of inspiration." Edna ostensibly adheres to prescribed feminine standards before witnessing an iconoclastic revelation of her senses.

Melody catalyzes her awakening: a desire for new experience and escape from constraint. Solitude also aligns with Romanticism: she reaches a despondency akin to that of Maupassant, who tried suicide months before his death in 1893. Her suicide, Camastra suggests, is rooted in the poetic music's intimation of deeper longing.

== Publication and critical reception ==
The Awakening was particularly controversial upon publication in 1899. Although the novel never was technically banned, it was censored. Chopin's novel was considered immoral for its comparatively frank depictions of female sexual desire and for its depiction of a protagonist who chafed against social norms and established gender roles. The public reaction to the novel was similar to the protests that greeted the publication and performance of Henrik Ibsen's landmark drama A Doll's House (1879), a work with which The Awakening shares an almost identical theme. Both contain a female protagonist who abandons her husband and children for self-fulfilment.

However, published reviews ran the gamut from outright condemnation to the recognition of The Awakening as an important work of fiction by a gifted practitioner. Divergent reactions of two newspapers in Chopin's hometown of St. Louis reflect these polarities. The St. Louis Republic labeled the novel "poison" and "too strong a drink for moral babes", and the St. Louis Mirror stated "One would fain beg the gods, in pure cowardice, for sleep unending rather than to know what an ugly, cruel, loathsome Monster Passion can be when, like a tiger, it slowly awakens. This is the kind of awakening that impresses the reader in Mrs. Chopin's heroine." Later in the same year, the St. Louis Post-Dispatch praised the novel in "A St. Louis Woman Who Has Turned Fame Into Literature."

Some reviews clucked in disappointment at Chopin's choice of subject: "It was not necessary for a writer of so great refinement and poetic grace to enter the over-worked field of sex-fiction" (Chicago Times Herald). Others mourned the loss of good taste; The Nation claimed that the book opened with high expectations, "remembering the author's agreeable short stories," and closed with "real disappointment," suggesting public dissatisfaction with the chosen topic: "we need not have been put to the unpleasantness of reading about her." The Nation also called Chopin "one more clever writer gone wrong."

Some reviews indulged in outright vitriol as when Public Opinion stated "We are well-satisfied when Mrs. Pontellier deliberately swims out to her death in the waters of the gulf."

Chopin's work also garnered qualified, but still negative, reviews. The Dial called The Awakening a "poignant spiritual tragedy" with the caveat that the novel was "not altogether wholesome in its tendencies." Similarly, The Congregationalist called Chopin's novel "a brilliant piece of writing" but concludes "We cannot commend it." In the Pittsburgh Leader, Willa Cather set The Awakening alongside Madame Bovary, Gustave Flaubert's equally notorious and equally reviled novel of suburban ennui and unapologetic adultery—but Cather was no more impressed with the heroine than were most of her contemporaries. Cather "hope[d] that Miss Chopin will devote that flexible, iridescent style of hers to a better cause."

== Historical context ==
In the 1890s, when Chopin wrote The Awakening, a range of social changes and tensions that brought "the woman question" into public discussion influenced Chopin's novel.

Louisiana, the setting for The Awakening, was a largely Catholic state where divorce was extremely rare, and women were expected to stay loyal and faithful to their husbands, and men to their wives. A main issue that 19th-century readers had with the novel was the idea of a woman's abandoning her duties as a wife and mother. Etiquette of the time proclaimed: "if she has the true mother-heart the companionship of her children will be the society which she will prefer above that of all others."

Chopin did not write another novel after The Awakening and had difficulty publishing stories after its release. American academic, Emily Toth, believes this disruption was in part because Chopin "went too far: Edna's sensuality was too much for the male gatekeepers." Chopin's next book was cancelled due to the publisher running out of funds, and health and family problems consumed her. When she died five years later, she was on her way to being forgotten. Per Seyersted, a Norwegian literary scholar, rediscovered Chopin in the 1960s, leading The Awakening to be regarded as a landmark in feminist fiction.

Literary critic Linda Wagner-Martin writes "sometimes being considered 'European' (or at least certainly 'French') rather than American, these types of works were condemned for the very ambivalence that made them brilliant and prescient pieces of writing." Chopin's The Awakening and other novels in the 19th and early 20th centuries were censored due to their perceived immorality, which included sexual impropriety, an argument supported by the initial reviews of the book found in newspapers at the time. Author Margo Culley stressed that Chopin was not the only woman challenging gender ideologies in this period; writing a novel brought her views into public prominence.

== Legacy and adaptations ==
In 1981, the novel was cinematized as The End of August, directed by Bob Graham and written by Leon Elswit, Gregory Nava, Eula Seaton, and Anna Thomas.

The Awakening serves as a structural and thematic background for Robert Stone's 1986 novel Children of Light, in which an assortment of doomed characters, including an alcoholic writer and a mentally unstable actress, gather in Mexico to make a film of Chopin's novel.

In 1991, The Awakening was dramatized in the film Grand Isle, directed by Mary Lambert and starring Kelly McGillis as Edna, Jon DeVries as Leonce, and Adrian Pasdar as Robert.

In "Wish Someone Would Care", the ninth episode of the first season of the HBO series Treme that aired in 2010, professor Creighton Bernette (John Goodman) assigns the novel to his class and briefly discusses it with his students.
