= Kate Chopin =

American author (1850–1904)

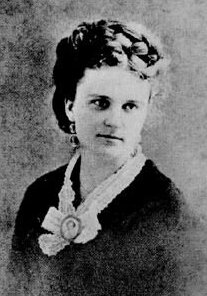
- Chopin in 1895
- Born: Katherine O'Flaherty; February 8, 1850; St. Louis, Missouri, U.S.
- Died: August 22, 1904 (aged 54); St. Louis, Missouri, U.S.
- Occupations: Novelist, short story writer
- Spouse: Oscar Chopin (m. 1870; died 1882)
- Children: 6, including Oscar Chopin Jr.
- Writing career
- Genre: Realistic fiction
- Notable work: The Awakening

Signature
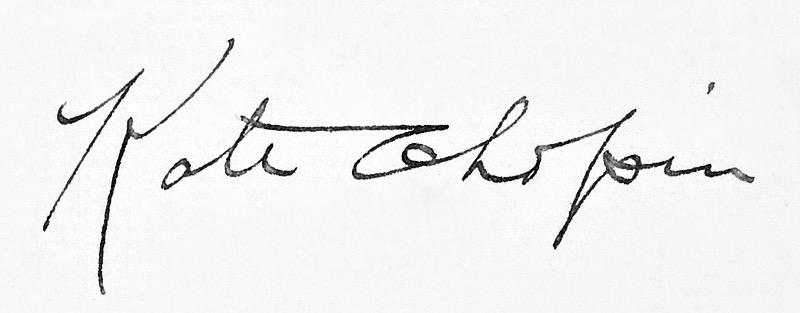

Katherine Chopin (/ˈʃoʊpæn/, also US: /ʃoʊˈpæn, ˈʃoʊpən/; née O'Flaherty; February 8, 1850 – August 22, 1904) was an American author of short stories and novels based in Louisiana. She is considered by scholars to have been a forerunner of American 20th-century feminist authors of Southern or Catholic background, such as Zelda Fitzgerald, and she is among the most frequently read and recognized writers of Louisiana Creole heritage. She is best known today for her 1899 novel The Awakening.

Of maternal French and paternal Irish descent, Chopin was born in St. Louis, Missouri. She married and moved with her husband to New Orleans. They later lived in the country in Cloutierville, Louisiana. From 1892 to 1895, Chopin wrote short stories for both children and adults that were published in national magazines, including The Atlantic Monthly, Vogue, The Century Magazine, and The Youth's Companion. Her stories aroused controversy because of her subjects and her approach; they were condemned as immoral by some critics.

Her major works were two short story collections and two novels. The collections are Bayou Folk (1894) and A Night in Acadie (1897). Her important short stories included "Désirée's Baby" (1893), a tale of an interracial relationship in antebellum Louisiana, "The Story of an Hour" (1894), and "The Storm" (written 1898, first published 1969). ("The Storm" is a sequel to her "At the 'Cadian Ball" (1892), which appeared in Bayou Folk, her first collection of short stories.) Chopin's two novels, At Fault (1890) and The Awakening (1899), are set in New Orleans and nearby Grand Isle. The characters in her stories are usually residents of Louisiana, and many are Creoles of various ethnic or racial backgrounds. Many of her works are set in Natchitoches in north-central Louisiana, a region where she lived.

Within a decade of her death, Chopin was widely recognized as one of the leading writers of her time. In 1915, Fred Lewis Pattee wrote "some of [Chopin's] work is equal to the best that has been produced in France or even in America. [She displayed] what may be described as a native aptitude for narration amounting almost to genius."

But by the 1950s she was practically forgotten by both literary scholars and the general public. Her re-discovery required a literary critic, a biography and collected edition by a scholar, praise from a New York Times columnist and publication in a mass-market paperback.

She was not related to famous Polish composer Frédéric Chopin, but she did have a son named Frederick Chopin, who was named after the composer.

== Life ==
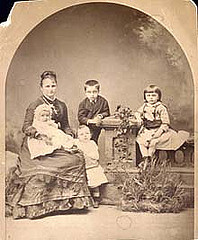
Chopin and her children in New Orleans, 1877

Chopin was born Katherine O'Flaherty in St. Louis, Missouri. Her father, Thomas O'Flaherty, was a successful businessman who had immigrated to the United States from Galway, Ireland. Her mother, Eliza Faris, was his second wife, and a well-connected member of the ethnic French community in St. Louis as the daughter of Athénaïse Charleville, a Louisiana Creole of French Canadian descent. Some of Chopin's ancestors were among the early European (French) inhabitants of Dauphin Island, Alabama.

Kate was the third of five children, but her sisters died in infancy and her half-brothers (from her father's first marriage) died in their early 20s. They were raised Catholic in the French and Irish traditions. She became an avid reader of fairy tales, poetry, religious allegories, and classic and contemporary novels. She graduated from Sacred Heart Convent in St. Louis in 1868.

At the age of five, she was sent to Sacred Heart Academy, where she learned how to handle her own money and make her own decisions. Upon her father's death, she was brought home to live with her grandmother and great-grandmother, comprising three generations of women who were widowed young and never remarried. For two years, she was tutored at home by her great-grandmother, Victoria (or Victoire) Charleville, who taught French, music, history, gossip, and the need to look on life without fear. After those two years, Kate went back to Sacred Heart Academy, which her best friend and neighbor, Kitty Garesche, also attended, and where her mentor, Mary O'Meara, taught. A gifted writer of both verse and prose, O'Meara guided her student to write regularly, to judge herself critically, and to conduct herself valiantly. Nine days after Kate and Kitty's first communions in May 1861, the American Civil War came to St. Louis. During the war, Kate's half-brother died of fever, and her great-grandmother died as well. After the war ended, Kitty and her family were banished from St. Louis for supporting the Confederacy.

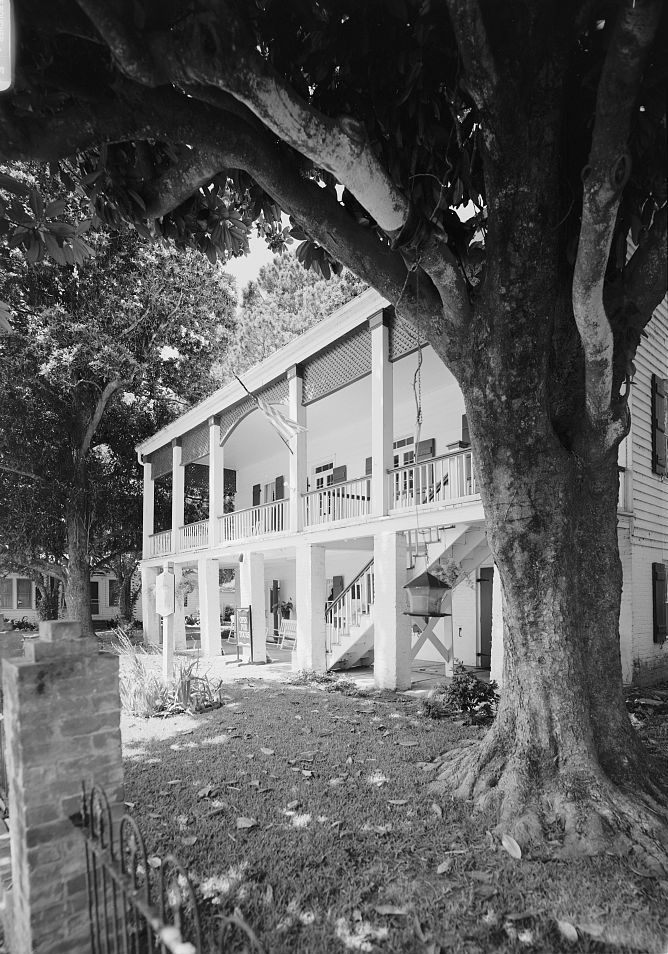
Chopin house in Cloutierville

In St. Louis, Missouri on June 8, 1870, she married Oscar Chopin and settled with him in his home town of New Orleans. The Chopins had six children between 1871 and 1879: in order of birth, Jean Baptiste, Oscar Charles, George Francis, Frederick, Felix Andrew, and Lélia (baptized Marie Laïza). In 1879, Oscar Chopin's cotton brokerage failed.

The family left the city and moved to Cloutierville in south Natchitoches Parish to manage several small plantations and a general store. They became active in the community, where Chopin found, in the local creole culture, much material for her future writing.

When Oscar Chopin died in 1882, he left Kate $42,000 in debt (approximately $1.4 million in 2025). The scholar Emily Toth noted that "for a while the widow Kate ran his [Oscar's] business and flirted outrageously with local men; (she even engaged in a relationship with a married farmer)." Although Chopin worked to make her late husband's plantation and general store succeed, she sold her Louisiana business two years later.

Chopin's mother had implored her to move back to St. Louis, which she did, with her mother's financial support. Her children gradually settled into life in the bustling city, but Chopin's mother died the following year.

Chopin struggled with depression after the successive loss of her husband, her business, and her mother. Chopin's obstetrician and family friend Dr. Frederick Kolbenheyer suggested that she start writing, believing that it could be therapeutic for her. He believed that writing could be a focus for her energy as well as a source of income.

By the early 1890s, Chopin's short stories, articles, and translations appeared in periodicals, including the St. Louis Post-Dispatch, and in various literary magazines. During a period of considerable publishing of folk tales, works in dialect, and other elements of Southern folk life, she was considered a regional writer who provided local color. Her literary qualities were largely overlooked.

In 1899, The Awakening, her second novel, was published. While some newspaper critics reviewed the novel favorably, the critical reception was largely negative. The critics considered the behavior of the novel's characters, especially the women, as well as Chopin's general treatment of female sexuality, motherhood, and marital infidelity, to be in conflict with prevailing standards of moral conduct and therefore offensive.

This novel, her best-known work, is the story of a woman trapped within the confines of an oppressive society. Out of print for several decades, it was rediscovered in the 1970s, when there was a wave of new studies and appreciation of women's writings. The novel has been reprinted and now is widely available. It has been critically acclaimed for its writing quality and importance as an example of early feminist literature of the South.

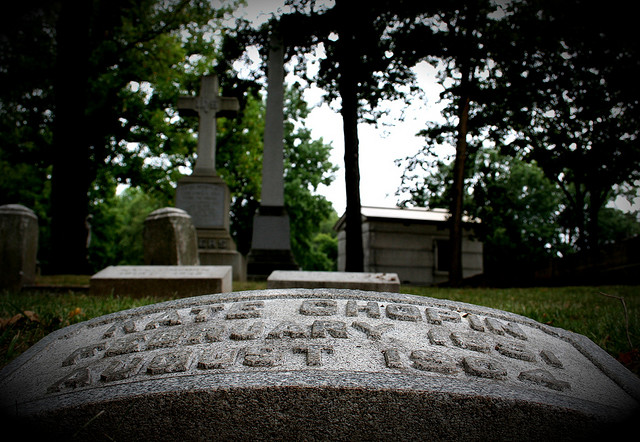
Kate Chopin's grave in Calvary Cemetery, St. Louis, Missouri

Critics suggest that such works as The Awakening were scandalous and therefore not socially embraced. Chopin was discouraged by the lack of acceptance, but she continued to write, primarily writing short stories. In 1900, she wrote "The Gentleman from New Orleans". That same year she was listed in the first edition of Marquis Who's Who. However, she never earned a significant amount of money from her writing, instead living off of the investments she made locally in Louisiana and St. Louis of the inheritance from her mother's estate.

While visiting the St. Louis World's Fair on August 20, 1904, Chopin suffered a brain hemorrhage. She died two days later, at the age of 54. She was interred in Calvary Cemetery in St. Louis.

== Literary themes ==
Kate Chopin lived in a variety of locations, based on different economies and societies. These were sources of insights and observations from which she analyzed and expressed her ideas about late 19th-century society in the Southern United States. She was brought up by women who were primarily ethnic French. Living in areas influenced by the Louisiana Creole and Cajun cultures after she joined her husband in Louisiana, she based many of her stories and sketches on her life in Louisiana. They expressed her unusual portrayals of women as individuals with separate wants and needs.

Chopin's writing style was influenced by her admiration of the contemporary French writer Guy de Maupassant, known for his short stories:

...I read his stories and marveled at them. Here was life, not fiction; for where were the plots, the old fashioned mechanism and stage trapping that in a vague, unthinkable way I had fancied were essential to the art of story making. Here was a man who had escaped from tradition and authority, who had entered into himself and looked out upon life through his own being and with his own eyes; and who, in a direct and simple way, told us what he saw...

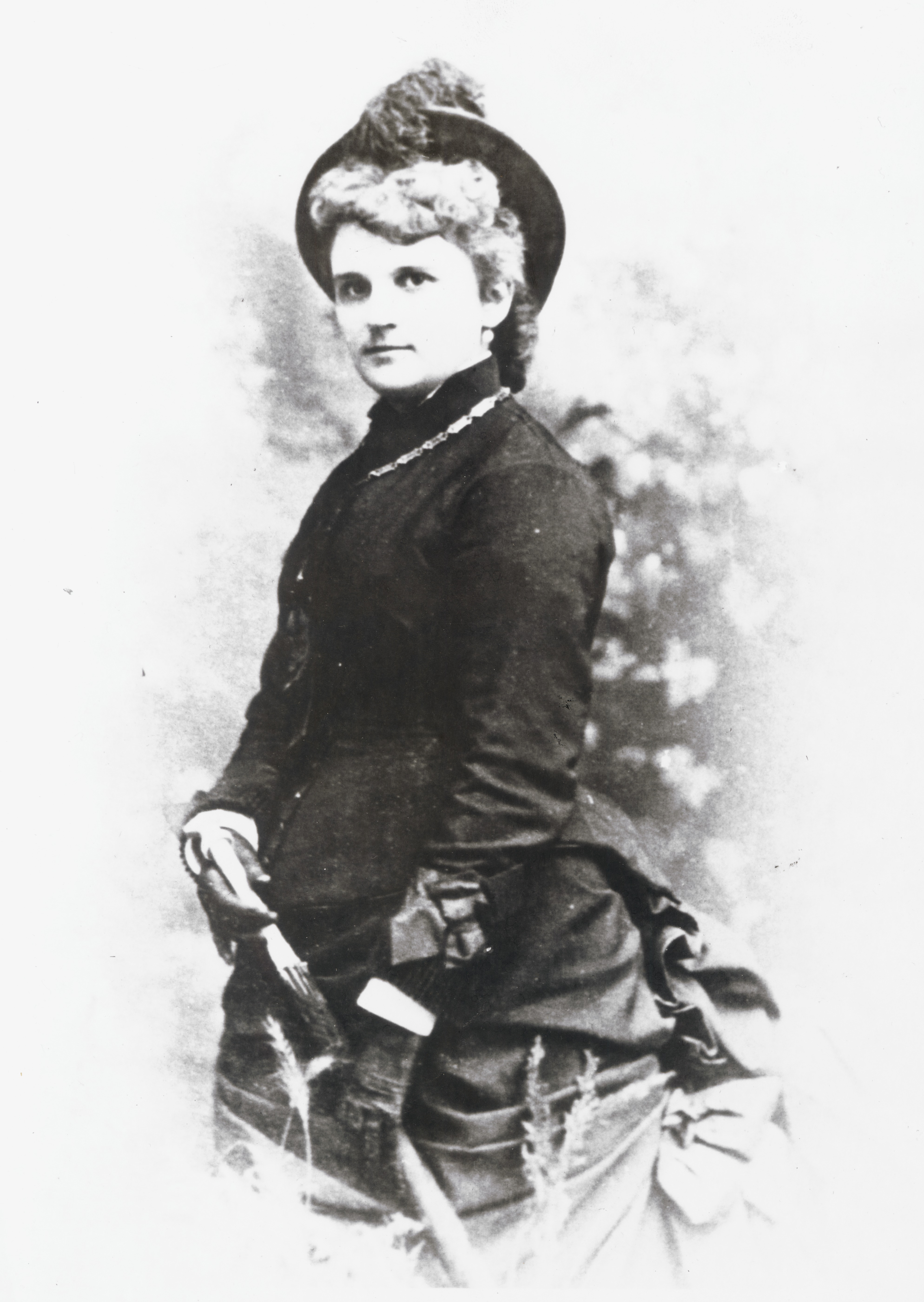
Kate Chopin in a riding habit, 1876

Kate Chopin is an example of a revisionist myth-maker because she revises myth more realistically about marriage and female sexuality of her time. The biggest myth Chopin focused on was the "Victorian notion of women's somewhat anemic sexuality" and "The Storm" is the best example of Kate Chopin using that myth through a character set on fulfilling her complete sexual potential. For instance, in "The Storm", portraits of women were revised by Kate Chopin to obtain consummation in roles other than marriage to evince a passionate nature considered inappropriate by conventional, patriarchal standards of Victorian America.

Chopin went beyond Maupassant's technique and style to give her writing its own flavor. She had an ability to perceive life and creatively express it. She concentrated on women's lives and their continual struggles to create an identity of their own within the Southern society of the late nineteenth century. For instance, in "The Story of an Hour", Mrs. Mallard allows herself time to reflect after learning of her husband's death. Instead of dreading the lonely years ahead, she stumbles upon another realization:

She knew that she would weep again when she saw the kind, tender hands folded in death; the face that had never looked save with love upon her, fixed and gray and dead. But she saw beyond that bitter moment a long procession of years to come that would belong to her absolutely. And she opened and spread her arms out to them in welcome.

Not many writers during the mid- to late 19th century were bold enough to address subjects that Chopin addressed. Elizabeth Fox-Genovese of Emory University wrote that "Kate was neither a feminist nor a suffragist, she said so. She was nonetheless a woman who took women extremely seriously. She never doubted women's ability to be strong." Kate Chopin's sympathies lay with the individual in the context of his and her personal life and society.

Through her stories, Chopin wrote a kind of autobiography and described her societies; she had grown up in a time when her surroundings included the abolitionist movements before the American Civil War, and their influence on freedmen education and rights afterward, as well as the emergence of feminism. Her ideas and descriptions were not reporting, but her stories expressed the reality of her world.

Chopin took strong interest in her surroundings and wrote about many of her observations. Jane Le Marquand assesses Chopin's writings as a new feminist voice, while other intellectuals recognize it as the voice of an individual who happens to be a woman. Marquand writes, "Chopin undermines patriarchy by endowing the Other, the woman, with an individual identity and a sense of self, a sense of self to which the letters she leaves behind give voice. The 'official' version of her life, that constructed by the men around her, is challenged and overthrown by the woman of the story."

Chopin appeared to express her belief in the strength of women. Marquand draws from theories about creative nonfiction in terms of her work. In order for a story to be autobiographical, or even biographical, Marquand writes, there has to be a nonfictional element, but more often than not the author exaggerates the truth to spark and hold interest for the readers. Kate Chopin might have been surprised to know her work has been characterized as feminist in the late 20th and early 21st centuries, just as she had been in her own time to have it described as immoral. Critics tend to regard writers as individuals with larger points of view addressed to factions in society.

=== Early works ===
Kate Chopin began her writing career with her first story published in the St. Louis Post-Dispatch. By the early 1890s, Chopin forged a successful writing career, contributing short stories and articles to local publications and literary journals. She also initially wrote a number of short stories such as "A Point at Issue!", "A No-Account Creole", "Beyond the Bayou", which were published in various magazines. In 1890, her first novel, At Fault, about a young widow and the sexual constraints of women, was published privately. The protagonist demonstrates the initial theme of Kate Chopin's works when she began writing. In 1892, Chopin produced "Désirée's Baby", "Ripe Figs", and "At the 'Cadian Ball", which appeared in Two Tales that year, and eight of her other stories were published.

The short story "Désirée's Baby" focuses on Chopin's experience with interracial relationships and communities of the Creoles of color in Louisiana. She came of age when slavery was institutionalized in St. Louis and the South. In Louisiana, there had been communities established of free people of color, especially in New Orleans, where formal arrangements were made between white men and free women of color or enslaved women for plaçage, a kind of common-law marriage. There and in the country, she lived with a society based on the history of slavery and the continuation of plantation life to a great extent. Mixed-race people were numerous in New Orleans and the South. This story addresses the racism of 19th century America; persons who were visibly European-American could be threatened by the revelation of also having African ancestry. Chopin was not afraid to address such issues, which were often suppressed and intentionally ignored by others. Her character Armand tries to deny this reality, when he refuses to believe that he is of partial black descent, as it threatens his ideas about himself and his status in life. R. R. Foy believed that Chopin's story reached the level of great fiction, in which the only true subject is "human existence in its subtle, complex, true meaning, stripped of the view with which ethical and conventional standards have draped it".

"Desiree's Baby" was first published in an 1893 issue of Vogue, alongside "A Visit to Avoyelles", another of Chopin's short stories, under the heading "Character Studies: The Father of Desiree's Baby – The Lover of Mentine". "A Visit to Avoyelles" typifies the local color writing that Chopin was known, and it is one of her stories that shows a couple in a completely fulfilled marriage. While Doudouce is hoping otherwise, he sees ample evidence that Mentine and Jules' marriage is a happy and fulfilling one, despite the poverty-stricken circumstances in which they live. In contrast, "Desiree's Baby", which is much more controversial due to the topic of interracial relationships, portrays a marriage in trouble. The other contrasts to "A Visit to Avoyelles" are clear, but some are more subtle than others. Unlike Mentine and Jules, Armand and Desiree are rich and own slaves and a plantation. Mentine and Jules' marriage has weathered many hard times, while Armand and Desiree's falls apart at the first sign of trouble. Kate Chopin was talented at showing various sides of marriages and local people and their lives, making her writing very broad and sweeping in topic, even as she had many common themes in her work.

Martha Cutter argues that Kate Chopin demonstrates feminine resistance to patriarchal society through her short stories. Cutter claims that Chopin's resistance can be traced through the timeline of her work, with Chopin becoming more and more understanding of how women can fight back suppression as time progresses. To demonstrate this, Cutter claims that Chopin's earlier stories, such as "At the 'Cadian Ball", "Wiser than a God", and "Mrs. Mobry's Reason" present women who are outright resisting, and are therefore not taken seriously, erased, or called insane. However, in Chopin's later stories, the female characters take on a different voice of resistance, one that is more "covert" and works to undermine patriarchal discourse from within. Cutter exemplifies this idea through the presentation of Chopin's works written after 1894. Cutter claims that Chopin wanted to "disrupt patriarchal discourse, without being censored by it". And to do this, Chopin tried different strategies in her writings: silent women, overly resistant women, women with a "voice covert", and women who mimic patriarchal discourse.

In 1893, she wrote "Madame Célestin's Divorce", and 13 of her stories were published. In 1894, "The Story of an Hour" and "A Respectable woman" were published by Vogue. Bayou Folk, a collection of 23 of Chopin's stories, was a success for Chopin in 1894, published by Houghton Mifflin. It was the first of her works to gain national attention, and it was followed by A Night in Acadie (1897), another collection of short stories.

=== The Awakening ===
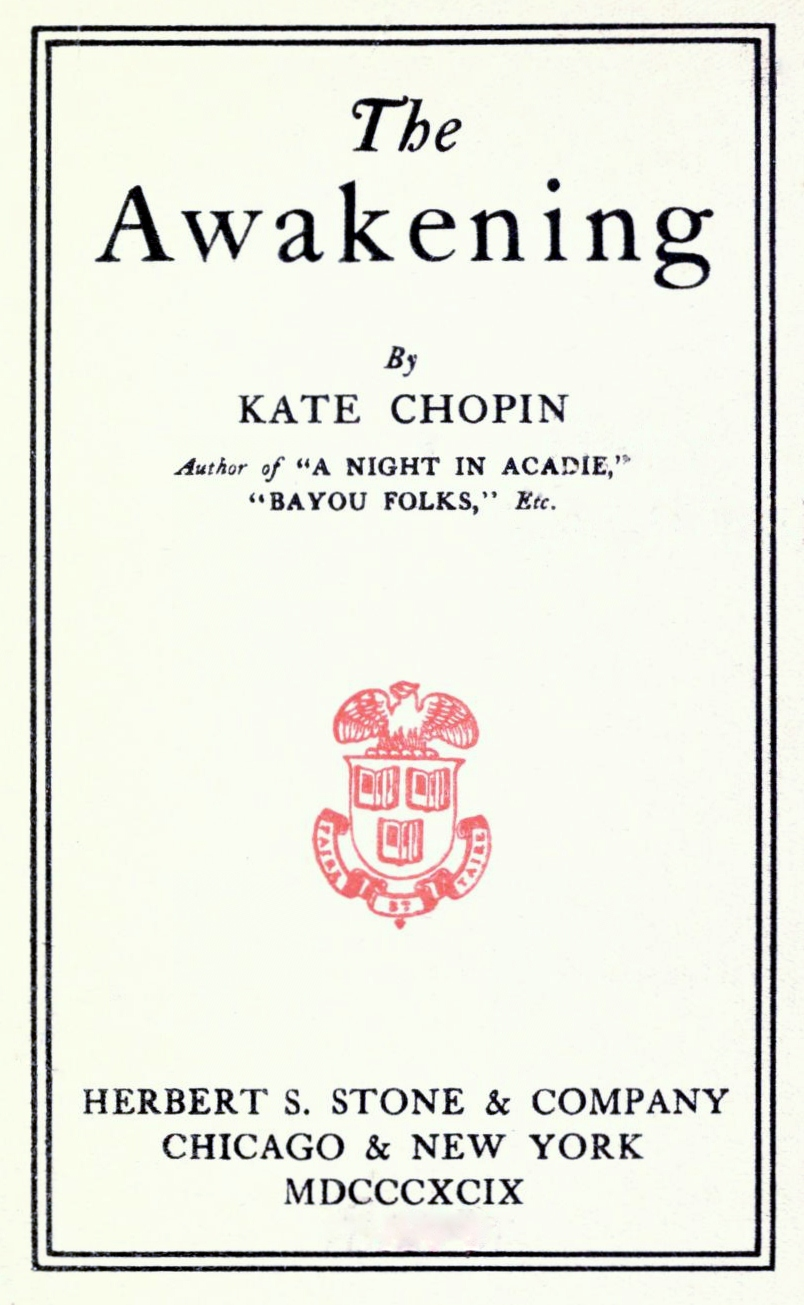
First edition title page of The Awakening (1899)

Published in 1899, her novel The Awakening is considered ahead of its time, garnering more negative reviews than positive from contemporary sources. Chopin was discouraged by this criticism, and she turned to writing short stories almost exclusively. The female characters in The Awakening went beyond the standards of social norms of the time. The protagonist has sexual desires and questions the sanctity of motherhood. The novel explores the theme of marital infidelity from the perspective of a married woman. The book was widely banned, and it fell out of print for several decades, then was republished in the 1970s. It now is considered a classic of feminist fiction. Chopin reacted to the negative events happening to her by commenting:

I never dreamt of Mrs. Pontellier making such a mess of things and working out her own damnation as she did. If I had had the slightest intimation of such a thing I would have excluded her from the company. But when I found out what she was up to, the play was half over and it was then too late.

According to Bender, Chopin was intrigued by Darwin's The Descent of Man and Selection in Relation to Sex. Although she agreed with the theory of evolution, Chopin disagreed with Darwin's theory of sexual selection and the female's role, and she expressed her opposition in The Awakening, in which, Bender argues, Chopin references The Descent of Man. In his essay, Darwin suggests female inferiority and says that males had "gained the power of selection". Bender argues that in her writing, Chopin presented women characters that had selective power based on their own sexual desires, not the need for reproduction or love. Bender argues this idea through the examples of Edna Pontellier in The Awakening, Mrs. Baroda in "A Respectable Woman", and Mrs. Mallard in "The Story of an Hour".

Martha Cutter's article "The Search for a Feminine Voice in the Works of Kate Chopin" analyzes the female characters in many of Chopin's stories. Cutter argues that Chopin's opinion of women as being "the invisible and unheard sex" is exemplified through the characterization of Edna in The Awakening. Cutter argues that Chopin's writing was shocking due to its sexual identity and articulation of feminine desire. According to Cutter, Chopin's stories disrupt patriarchal norms. Today, The Awakening is said to be one of the five top favorite novels in literature courses all over America.

== Reception and legacy ==
=== Legacy ===
Kate Chopin has been credited by some as a pioneer of the early feminist movement despite not achieving any literary rewards for her works.

=== Critical reception ===
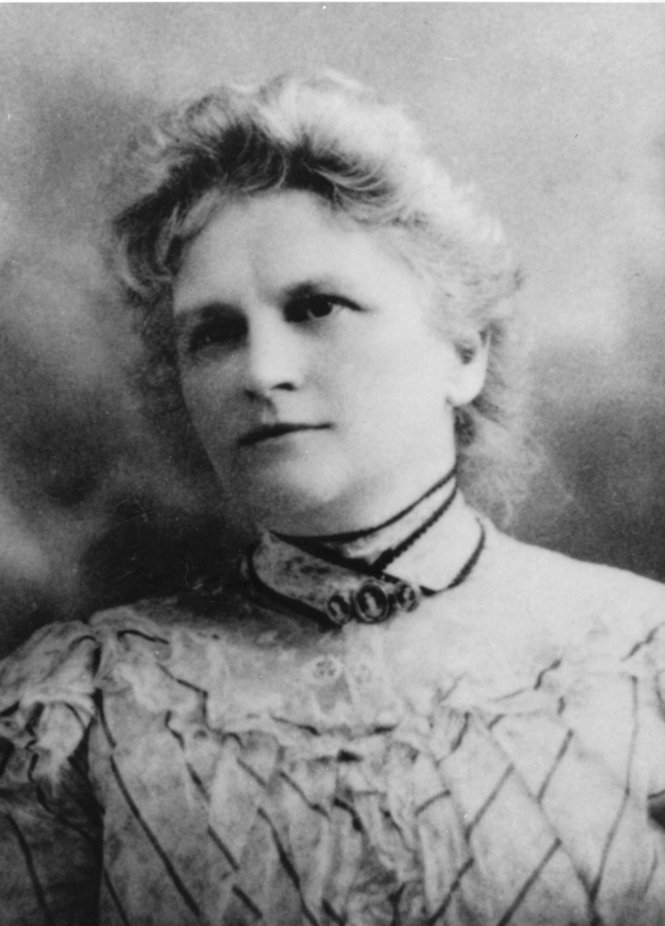
Kate Chopin

Kate Chopin wrote the majority of her short stories and novels from 1889 to 1904. Altogether, Chopin wrote about 100 short stories or novels during her time as a fiction writer; her short stories were published in a number of local newspapers including the St. Louis Post-Dispatch. A large number of her short stories were published in national magazines, such as Youth's Companion and Harper's Young People. Bayou Folk was well-reviewed, with Chopin's writing about how she had seen 100 press notices about it. Those stories were published in The New York Times and The Atlantic. Readers particularly liked how she used local dialects to give her characters a more authentic and relatable feel. She also published two novels: At Fault and The Awakening. Her novels were not well-received initially, compared to her short stories. Her 1899 novel The Awakening was considered to be immoral due to the overt themes of female sexuality, as well as the female protagonist's constantly rebuking gender roles and norms. There have been rumors that the novel originally was banned, which have been disproved. Local and national newspapers published mixed reviews of Chopin's novel with one calling it "poison" and "unpleasant", going on to say it was "too strong a drink for moral babes", while another newspaper published a review calling Chopin, "A St. Louis Woman Who Has Turned Fame Into Literature". The majority of the early reviews for The Awakening were largely negative. Emily Toth, one of Chopin's most well known biographers, thought she had gone too far with this novel. She argued that the protagonist Edna's blatant sensuality was too much for the male gatekeepers. So much so that publication of her next novel was cancelled.

The poet Orrick Johns was at least one strong advocate of Chopin and The Awakening, calling her "an influential modernist poet and progressive journalist originally from St. Louis who was popular in Greenwich Village literary circles". in 1911 he wrote in Reedy's Mirror: "To one who has read her as a boy and come back to her again with powers of appreciation more subtly developed, she breathes the magic of a whole chapter in his life." "...[C]redible evidence exists that Johns shared his positive views of Chopin with his literary peers, a tight-knit group that included feminist writers Susan Glaspell and Edith Summers Kelley..." Through Johns's personal friendship with Kelley and his fierce advocacy for The Awakening, it has been argued that Kelley read and was influenced by The Awakening, a book once thought of as a literary dead end in terms of influence on the next generation of feminist writers. Textual comparisons between specific texts in Kelly's Weeds and The Awakening point toward an argument for its wider influence.

By the 1950s, Kate Chopin was all but forgotten. Her books were all out of print, only her story "Désirée's Baby" was in print in numerous American short story anthologies. That started to change in 1962, when noted literary critic Edmund Wilson included her as one of 30 authors discussed in Patriotic Gore: Studies in the Literature of the American Civil War. Unhappy that he had to read some of her works on microfilm at the Library of Congress, Wilson urged Per Seyersted, a Norwegian who had written an article on her and who was studying in America, to focus his studies on her. Seven years later, in 1969, Seyersted published The Complete Works of Kate Chopin and a full-length biography. These two books formed the scholarly support for a rediscovery of Chopin.

It took a brief commentary by novelist Linda Wolfe in the September 22, 1972, issue of The New York Times to kickstart the rediscovery of Chopin by the general public. In "There's Someone You Should Know – Kate Chopin", she described how she encouraged friends disappointed with contemporary fiction to discover Chopin and how The Awakening spoke to her today. The last step required to bring the novel to general awareness happened almost immediately. Before the year was out, a major mass-market paperback publisher, Avon Books, had the first mass-market paperback publication of the book heading to drug stores, supermarkets, and bookstores. A blurb from Wolfe's comments was featured prominently below the title and author's name at the top of the cover: "'Speaks to me as pertinently as any fiction published this year or last. It is uncanny, nothing else . . . A masterpiece.' Linda Wolfe, The New York Times". Within a few years, all of the major mass-market paperback publishers had editions of The Awakening in print, making it widely available for anyone to buy.

Per Seyersted's rediscovery of Chopin caused her work to be seen as essential feminist and Southern literature from the 19th century. Seyersted wrote that she "broke new ground in American Literature". According to Emily Toth, author of a recent Chopin biography, Kate Chopin's work rose in popularity and recognition during the 1970s due to themes of women venturing outside of the constraints set upon them by society, which appealed to people participating in feminist activism and the sexual revolution. She also argues that the works appealed to women in the 1960s, "a time when American women yearned to know about our feisty foremothers". Academics and scholars began to put Chopin in the same feminist categories as Louisa May Alcott, Susan Warner, and Emily Dickinson. Parallels between Alcott and Chopin have been drawn to point out how both authors wrote about women who departed from their traditional roles by dreaming of or striving for independence and individual freedoms, also described as a dramatization of a woman's struggle for selfhood. A reviewer for Choice Reviews stated that it was ultimately a struggle doomed to failure because the patriarchal conventions of her society restricted her freedom. Karen Simons felt that this failed struggle was perfectly captured by the ending of the novel, where Edna Pontellier realizes that she cannot truly be both the traditional mother and have a sense of herself as an individual at the same time.

== Representation in other media ==
Louisiana Public Broadcasting, under president Beth Courtney, produced Kate Chopin: A Reawakening, a documentary on Chopin's life.

In the penultimate episode of the first season of HBO's Treme, set in New Orleans, the teacher Creighton (played by John Goodman) assigns Chopin's The Awakening to his freshman class at Tulane University in New Orleans, and warns them:

"I want you to take your time with it," he cautions. "Pay attention to the language itself. The ideas. Don't think in terms of a beginning and an end. Because unlike some plot-driven entertainments, there is no closure in real life. Not really."

== Works ==
=== Short story collections ===
- Bayou Folk (Houghton, Mifflin and Co., 1894)
- A Night in Acadie (Way & Williams, 1897)

=== Novels ===
- At Fault (Nixon-Jones Printing Co., 1890)
- The Awakening (H. S. Stone & Co., 1899)

=== Posthumously published ===
- The Complete Works of Kate Chopin, ed. Per Seyersted (Louisiana State University Press, 1969)
- A Kate Chopin Miscellany, ed. Per Seyersted and Emily Toth (Northwestern State University Press, 1979)
- Complete Novels and Stories (Library of America, 2002)

=== Individual stories ===
- "Emancipation: A Life Fable" (undated, written c. 1869–70), included in The Complete Works
- "A Point at Issue!" (1889), included in The Complete Works
- "A No-Account Creole" (written 1888/1891, published 1894), included in Bayou Folk
- "Beyond the Bayou" (written 1891, published 1893), included in Bayou Folk
- "Ripe Figs" (written 1892, published 1893), included in A Night in Acadie
- "At the 'Cadian Ball" (1892), included in Bayou Folk
- "Désirée's Baby" (1893), included in Bayou Folk
- "Madame Célestin's Divorce" (1893), included in Bayou Folk
- "At Chênière Caminada" (1894), included in A Night in Acadie
- "A Respectable Woman" (1894), included in A Night in Acadie
- "The Story of an Hour" (1894), included in The Complete Works
- "Lilacs" (written 1894, published 1896), included in The Complete Works
- "Regret" (1894), included in A Night in Acadie
- "The Kiss" (written 1894, published 1895), included in The Complete Works
- "Ozème's Holiday" (written 1894, published 1896), included in The Complete Works
- "Her Letters" (written 1894, published 1895), included in The Complete Works
- "Athénaïse" (written 1895, published 1896), included in A Night in Acadie
- "The Unexpected" (1895), included in The Complete Works
- "Fedora" (written 1895, published 1897), included in The Complete Works
- "A Vocation and a Voice" (written 1896, published 1902), included in The Complete Works
- "A Pair of Silk Stockings" (1897), included in The Complete Works
- "The Locket" (written 1897), included in The Complete Works
- "An Egyptian Cigarette" (written 1897, published 1900), included in The Complete Works
- "The Storm" (written 1898), included in The Complete Works
- "Charlie" (written 1900), included in The Complete Works

== Honors and awards ==
- Her home with Oscar Chopin in Cloutierville was built by Alexis Cloutier in the early part of the 19th century. In the late 20th century, the house was designated as the Kate Chopin House, a National Historic Landmark (NHL), because of her literary significance. The house was adapted for use as the Bayou Folk Museum. On October 1, 2008, the house was destroyed by a fire, with little left but the chimney.
- In 1990, Chopin was honored with a star on the St. Louis Walk of Fame.
- In 2012, she was commemorated with an iron bust of her head at the Writer's Corner in the Central West End neighborhood of St. Louis, across the street from Left Bank Books.

== See also ==
- Literature of Louisiana
- Chopin, Louisiana
