= Bordertown (2007 film) =

American crime drama film directed by Gregory Nava

- Theatrical release poster
- Directed by: Gregory Nava
- Written by: Gregory Nava
- Produced by: Gregory Nava; Jennifer Lopez; Simon Fields
- Starring: Jennifer Lopez; Martin Sheen; Maya Zapata; Sônia Braga; Antonio Banderas
- Cinematography: Reynaldo Villalobos
- Edited by: Padraic McKinley
- Music by: Graeme Revell
- Distributed by: THINKFilm; Capitol Films
- Release date: February 15, 2007 (Berlin International Film Festival)
- Running time: 112 minutes
- Country: United States
- Languages: English; Spanish
- Budget: $21 million
- Box office: $8.3 million

Bordertown is a 2007 American crime drama film written and directed by Gregory Nava, and starring Jennifer Lopez (who also served as a producer), Martin Sheen, Maya Zapata, Sônia Braga and Antonio Banderas. This is the third film which featured the collaboration between Nava and Lopez, following the 1997's biopic film Selena and 1995's My Family.

The film is inspired by the true story of the numerous female homicides in Ciudad Juárez originally brought to light in documentaries produced by Tom Golden and tells the story of an inquisitive American reporter sent in by her American newspaper to investigate the murders.

Lopez also recorded a song for the film entitled Porque La Vida Es Asi.

== Plot ==
The opening titles explain that American corporations are using the North American Free Trade Agreement by opening large maquiladoras right across the United States–Mexico border. The maquiladoras hire mostly Mexican women to work long hours for little money in order to produce mass quantity products.

Lauren Adrian (Jennifer Lopez), an impassioned American news reporter for the Chicago Sentinel wants to be assigned to the Iraq front-lines to cover the war. Instead, her editor George Morgan (Martin Sheen) assigns her to investigate a series of slayings involving young maquiladora factory women in a Mexican bordertown.

Worker Eva (Maya Zapata), originally from the southern Mexican state of Oaxaca, takes a bus to go back to her shanty-town home after work. After a while she is the last passenger still in the bus. The driver asks her if she minds if he goes to a gas station to fill up, and Eva agrees. However, he takes her to a remote place and assaults and rapes her, together with another man, who then tries to strangle her. The two men, believing she is dead, bury her alive. With the little energy she has left, Eva escapes.

Adrian heads to Ciudad Juárez, Chihuahua, on the U.S.–Mexico border to investigate the murders, hoping that if she does well she will be promoted by Morgan to be a foreign correspondent. In Juárez, Adrian meets up with Diaz (Antonio Banderas), whom she had been working with six years before, and who is now the editor for the local newspaper El Sol de Juárez. She also meets Eva.

The three try to find the two killers and have them prosecuted. For this purpose Adrian starts working in the factory in order to act as bait on the bus ride. The driver tries to assault her in the same way he did Eva, and although police assistance has been arranged, they are at the wrong place. She manages to escape her attacker. Later Diaz gets shot and killed in a drive-by shooting. Eva changes her mind and does not want to testify any more for fear of revenge, and tries to flee to the U.S., together with others in the trunk of a car. She gets caught and is sent back. Adrian convinces her to testify after all. For political reasons the Chicago Sentinel refuses to publish Adrian's story. Adrian quits and becomes the editor for El Sol de Juárez.

== Cast ==
- Jennifer Lopez as Lauren Adrian: reporter for the Chicago Sentinel, and daughter of Mexican immigrants.
- Antonio Banderas as Alfonso Diaz: founder of newspaper El Sol.
- Maya Zapata as Eva Jimenez: factory worker and rape survivor.
- Sônia Braga as Teresa Casillas: founder of an organization trying to help the women in Juárez.
- Teresa Ruiz as Cecila Rojas: a young factory worker.
- Juan Diego Botto as Marco Antonio Salamanca: son of the extremely rich Salamanca family, owner of one of the maquiladora.
- Zaide Silvia Gutiérrez as Lourdes Jimenez: Eva's concerned mother.
- Martin Sheen as George Morgan: Lauren's boss.
- Randall Batinkoff as Frank Kozerski: Lauren's co-worker and friend.
- Kate del Castillo as Elena Diaz.
- Rene Rivera as Aris Rodriguez: rapist.
- Irineo Álvarez as Domingo Esparza: bus driver and rapist.
- Juanes as himself

== Production ==
=== Background ===
The motion picture is based on a series of unsolved murders in Ciudad Juárez, Chihuahua, a large Mexican border city across the Río Bravo del Norte (Rio Grande) from El Paso, Texas.

When Gregory Nava first heard about the murders in Ciudad Juárez he wanted to do something. He said that his vision became to tell the stories through "an exciting thriller-drama".

Gregory Nava approached Jennifer Lopez to do the film in 1998 and she was receptive. Lopez said, "Since first hearing of these atrocities in 1998, when Gregory Nava came to me with this project, I desperately wanted to tell this story. I began working to ensure we made this film in order to bring the attention of the world to [the] tragedy and to pressure the Mexican government to bring to justice those responsible for these horrible crimes."

Director Gregory Nava and executive producer Barbara Martinez-Jitner believed that the film would bring strong reactions. Gregory Nava has said the production received threats against himself and the cast. Also, there was stolen equipment and intimidation of film crew members when they filmed in Mexico.

According to Martinez-Jitner, when they first filmed in Ciudad Juárez, the police began threatening locals who were helping the production. They also began stalking the crew. A camera truck was vandalized and $100,000 worth of film equipment was stolen.

Bordertown places the blame for the murders upon the Mexican government, the United States and the maquiladora assembly plants that were brought rapidly into existence by the North American Free Trade Agreement.

Gregory Nava said, "[When] there are very powerful forces involved, you're going to be attacked. I expect the Mexican government to get very upset about it."

=== Screenplay ===
The inspiration for the story, according to Gregory Nava, was the work of Guatemalan writer Miguel Ángel Asturias, the magic realism of novelist Gabriel García Márquez, and the social dramas of Britain's Charles Dickens. He also said the screenplay was a return to an El Norte type of screenplay (Oscar nominated). In El Norte he created a screenplay from many of the interviews he conducted. He did the same in Bordertown.

=== Financing ===
Mobius Entertainment, the production company, borrowed money to complete the project from the New Mexico State Investment Council (NMSI) but was late in paying back the loan in March, 2006. A second $12.65 million loan could be called in by NMSI before its November, 2007 due date because of the late payments. The second loan calls for zero interest because the state of New Mexico will take ten percent of any profits the film might make. Film producers said the delay of payment was due to filming taking longer than expected.

At one point the film was in development with both New Line Cinema and MGM.

=== Filming locations ===
Filming locations include: Albuquerque, New Mexico, in the United States; and Nogales, Sonora, Ciudad Juárez, Chihuahua, and Mexicali, Baja California, in Mexico.

== Reception ==
=== Box office ===
The movie was released in theaters internationally only, starting in Germany on February 22, 2007. The film ended up grossing $8,327,171 worldwide. It was released straight-to-DVD in the United States on January 29, 2008.

=== Critical response ===
Kirk Honeycutt, in The Hollywood Reporter, wrote: "It wants to be a thriller, a piece of investigative journalism, a political soapbox and a vehicle for Jennifer Lopez. It serves none of these masters well." Honeycutt also said the screenplay is full of plot holes.

According to media reports, the audience reacted with a mixture of "boos and muted applause" when the film finished screening.

The film was also criticized for a gratuitous musical performance and cameo by the Colombian recording artist Juanes, seen by many as pandering to a Latino audience.

Variety magazine film critic, Leslie Felperin, had a problem with some of the arguments made in the film, namely: that the North American Free Trade Agreement (NAFTA) and the exploitation of Mexican labor directly led to the killing of many women in Ciudad Juárez. Felperin wrote, "Possible co-factors or causes of the real crime spree, such as rife drug-related criminality, domestic violence largely ignored by the authorities, and the possibility that at least some of the culprits may be U.S. citizens crossing the border to kill for kicks, are not explored here." As for the film, Felperin calls the movie "only fair-to-poor".

=== Accolades ===
Jennifer Lopez received the "Artists for Amnesty" award presented by Amnesty International at the Berlin International Film Festival. She won the award for her role as producer and star of a film "examining the ongoing murders of hundreds of women in a Mexican border town".
