= Moosewood Restaurant =

Restaurant in Ithaca, New York, U.S.

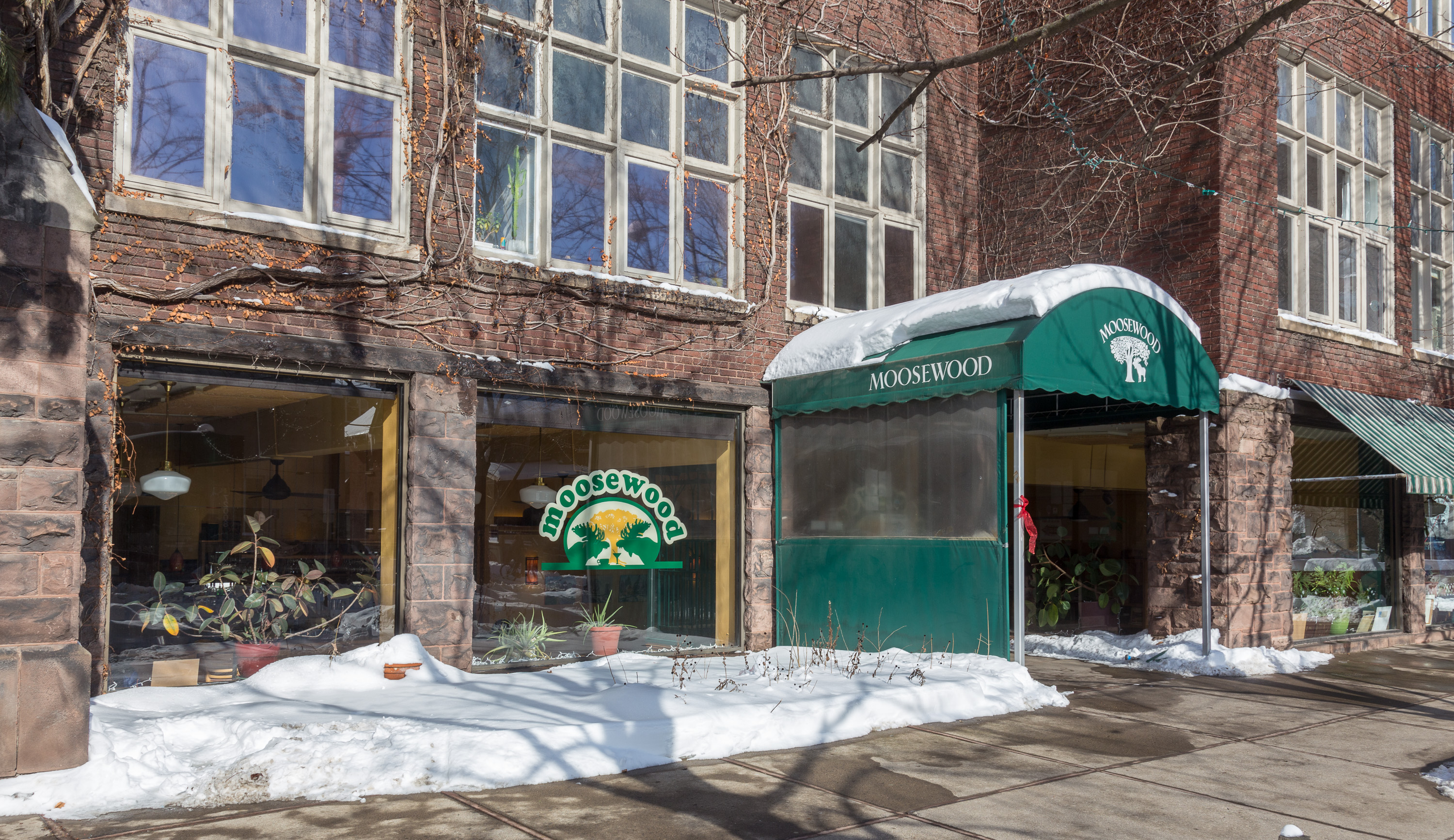
- Interactive map of Moosewood Restaurant

Restaurant information
- Established: January 3, 1973; 53 years ago
- Owner: Danica Wilcox
- Food type: Natural foods (vegetarian, vegan)
- Location: 215 N. Cayuga Street, Ithaca, New York, 14850, United States
- Coordinates: 42°26′29″N 76°29′56″W
- Website: www.moosewoodrestaurant.com

Moosewood Restaurant is an American natural foods restaurant in Ithaca, New York, founded in 1973. In 1978, the founders sold the restaurant to the staff, who became "The Moosewood Collective". In addition to producing a number of James Beard Award winning and nominated cookbooks (by the Moosewood Collective), The Moosewood Restaurant also won the James Beard America's Classics award from the James Beard Foundation in 2000.

== Overview ==
Moosewood Restaurant was founded as a worker collective on January 3, 1973, during the natural foods and farm-to-table movements within the American counterculture. According to the self-published 1974 Moosewood Cookbook (created by staff members), "a group of seven people started building [Moosewood Restaurant] in the fall of 1972", and the name was inspired by Patrick, one of the founders, "who once read a book and in it was a character-a dog in fact-named Moosewood; it is also the name of a lovely striped maple tree." Its original goal was to provide dishes made of "local, sustainable" food. Although meat was served when the restaurant first opened, it was dropped from the menu. The focus turned to natural foods that primarily featured vegetarian (and later vegan) dishes, but has also included pescetarian options on its menu and in its cookbooks.

It was popular with countercultural icons: "Crosby and Nash once shared drinks at the bar, and Allen Ginsberg ended his dinner with a Moosewood brownie and black coffee. Even the Grateful Dead stopped by during their trip for Cornell's Barton Hall show, only to go unrecognized by the members of the collective."

== History ==
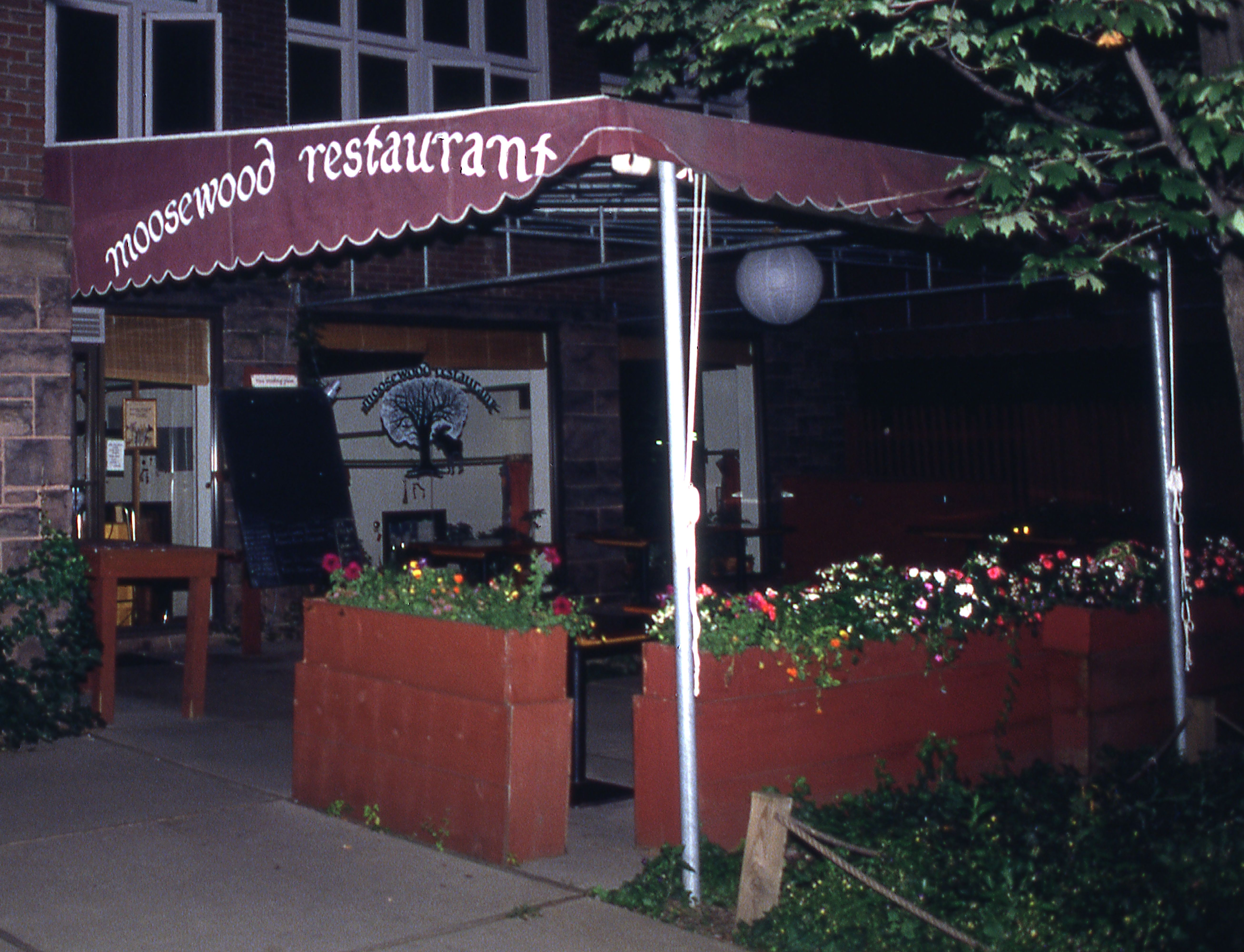
September 1992, exterior, Moosewood Restaurant, Ithaca, New York

=== 1970s ===
Moosewood was established in "the ground level of the Dewitt Building at 215 N. Cayuga St", and sits "[in the] southeast corner of the building [...] its décor included barn board wainscoting, fifteen wooden tables, mix-matched chairs, and tie-dyed curtains." The founders originally developed the restaurant as “a place to feed their community. The vision was to put forward ideas about sustainable farming and environmentally friendly food systems but to do so in a delicious way." It was also set up to:

"run collectively, with the aim of supporting a lot of people and sharing the responsibilities of presenting good food to the community. Everyone gets paid the same hourly wage, the 15% service charge is divided among all who work during each day, and while a certain amount of specialization seems inevitable, everyone is encouraged to become skilled at all the different jobs...People often ask us about our philosophy on food - we have no set response, nor do we collectively subscribe to a particular school of thought. From the onset, we decided not to mount a crusade against so-called 'bad' or 'plastic food.'...very simply, we try to offer a lot possibilities without any dogma, reckoning that someone who comes in for the brownies will eventually try a fresh vegetable salad and a meat and potatoes person might try a vegetarian casserole...the basic supposition is that if healthy foods are prepared in delicious ways, people will be inclined to want to eat them."(p.5)

Wynnie Stein, an original Moosewood member, states she became involved due to the emphasis on local ingredients: "it's important for people to know where their food was produced. I saw Moosewood's Collective involvement in this locally sourced foods movement and I am so glad to be a part of it. It's refreshing to be part of a group of individuals who support the use of locally produced fruits, vegetables, and grains." Stein also notes that the "first people who were involved were very idealistic, none of them had any restaurant experience. They were just great cooks and they loved to cook... we were really interested in food being not just helpful or good for you, but super creative and delicious, and I think that's what set us apart from the rest of the natural foods movement."

In 1978, the original founders sold Moosewood to the restaurant staff, now called "The Moosewood Collective". David Hirsch (who joined Moosewood in 1976) recalls that there "were seven original owners, and by the time I started there were only two left who were still working there. Within a couple of years we bought out the original seven owners and formed it as more of a philosophical collective, because it wasn't a true cooperative economically. We would have meetings and try for consensus on different decisions that were important. We didn't have a hierarchical leadership; it was more horizontal."

=== New ownership (2022–present) ===
During the COVID-19 pandemic, the members of the collective began to explore selling Moosewood. Danica Wilcox (the daughter of Kip Wilcox, an original member of Moosewood who specialized in desserts) eventually bought it, and original Moosewood member Wynnie Stein worked with her to make the transition.

Wilcox took over as of January 1, 2022, and has launched a new menu that will be "more vegan, more local and sustainable". She also notes that while Moosewood's "menu has often included fish throughout the years – which we may reintroduce – ...our focus right now is to highlight the beautiful produce, grains, dairy and wine available in our region...the first new menu celebrates authentically vegetarian cuisine.”

== Cookbooks ==
=== Moosewood Restaurant ===
In 1974, members of the original Moosewood staff self- published a spiral bound paper-covered vegetarian cookbook (the second printing had 79 pages), with "The Moosewood Cookbook Recipes from Moosewood Restaurant in the Dewitt Mall, Ithaca, New York, Copyright 1974 Moosewood", on the title page. Page three contains a list of its creators: "Design, Editing, Hand-writing, Pen-and-ink illustrations Mollie Katzen Feedback digestion, Critical Analysis, Introduction & History Nancy McCauley Cover Drawing Judith M. Barringer Onion Photogram Kathy Morris Frontispiece: charcoal drawing Meredith (Mimi) Barchat Photographs Phyllis Boudreau Photographic Montage Phyllis Boudreau Susan B. Lent." In addition, page 79 contains a list of cookbooks titled "Postward". The list includes titles such as Diet for a Small Planet, Great Meatless Meals, Recipes for a Small Planet, The Yogi Cookbook (Yogi Vithaldas and Susan Roberts), Ten Talents, The Vegetarian Epicure, Sunset Mexican Cookbook, and The Joy of Cooking. It is preceded by the following statement: "Because we have only presented our original recipes in this book, you may not have found a recipe for something you ate at Moosewood and liked. For this reason, and because we want to share our sources of inspiration with you, it is our pleasure to acknowledge our favorite cookbooks."

- Moosewood Restaurant (1974). The Moosewood Cookbook Recipes from Moosewood Restaurant In the Dewitt Mall Ithaca, New York. Moosewood Restaurant.

=== Moosewood Cookbook ===
In 1977, Ten Speed Press in California published a revised version of the 1974 self-published original, titled The Moosewood Cookbook and subtitled Recipes from Moosewood Restaurant Ithaca, New York, Compiled, Edited, Illustrated and Hand-Lettered by Mollie Katzen .

The Moosewood Cookbook became a highly influential vegetarian cookbook, with four editions (1977, 1992, 2000, 2014).

- Katzen, Mollie (1977). Moosewood Cookbook. Ten Speed Press. ISBN 0-913668-68-0.
- Katzen, Mollie (1992). Moosewood Cookbook: New Revised Edition. Ten Speed Press. ISBN 0-89815-490-1.
- Katzen, Mollie (2000). The New Moosewood Cookbook. Ten Speed Press. ISBN 1-58008-130-4.
- Katzen, Mollie (2014). Moosewood Cookbook:40th Anniversary Edition. Ten Speed Press. ISBN 978-1-60774-739-0.

=== Moosewood Collective ===
Beginning in the late 1980s, The Moosewood Collective began a cookbook series. The first, published in 1987, is titled New Recipes From Moosewood Restaurant. Mollie Katzen states in a quote on the back cover: "It's been nearly ten years since I cooked at Moosewood Restaurant, and I had no hand making this book, yet these recipes evoke memories so fresh, it feels like I worked there yesterday." New Recipes From Moosewood Restaurant has been followed by thirteen more books of vegetarian, vegan, and Pescetarian recipes to date. A share of cookbook royalties have gone to various charities: "Ithaca Community Harvest, Planned Parenthood, AIDS Work of Tompkins County, Eritrean Relief Fund, Tibetan Resettlement Project, Greater Ithaca Activities Center, Loaves & Fishes, and Healthy Food for All." In 2014, the Collective donated "a copy of Moosewood Cooks for a Crowd cookbook to youth and adult secure facility/prisons, plus local schools, community centers and organizations, and spiritual centers throughout New York State."

In 2010, the Moosewood Collective donated its archive of original cookbook manuscripts and memorabilia to Cornell University. The papers are housed in the Division of Rare and Manuscript Collections in the Carl A. Kroch Library.

- Moosewood Collective (1987). New Recipes From Moosewood Restaurant. 10 Speed Press. ISBN 9780898152081.
- Moosewood Collective (1990). Sundays at Moosewood Restaurant. Touchstone. ISBN 9780671679903.
- Moosewood Collective (1992). Moosewood Restaurant Garden Kitchen. Simon and Schuster. ISBN 0671692399.
- Moosewood Collective (2005). Moosewood Restaurant Simple Suppers. Ten Speed. ISBN 9780609609125.
- Moosewood Collective (2009). Moosewood Restaurant Cooking for Health. Simon and Schuster. ISBN 978-1416548874.
- Moosewood Collective (2013). Moosewood Restaurant Favorites. St. Martin's Press. ISBN 9781250006257.
- Moosewood Collective (2017). Moosewood Restaurant Table. St. Martin's Press. ISBN 9781250074331.

Includes lists of vegan dishes

- Moosewood Collective (1994). Moosewood Restaurant Cooks at Home. Atria. ISBN 0671679929.
- Moosewood Collective (1996). Moosewood Restaurant Low-Fat Favorites. Crown. ISBN 9780517884942.
- Moosewood Collective (1997). Moosewood Restaurant Cooks for a Crowd. Wiley and Sons. ISBN 9780471238775.
- Moosewood Collective (1997). Moosewood Restaurant Book of Desserts. Clarkson Potter. ISBN 0517884933.
- Moosewood Collective (1999). Moosewood Restaurant Daily Special. Clarkson Potter. ISBN 9780965031424.
- Moosewood Collective (2001). Moosewood Restaurant New Classics. Crown Publishing. ISBN 9780609802410.
- Moosewood Collective (2003). Moosewood Restaurant Celebrates. Crown Publishing. ISBN 9780609808115.

== James Beard awards and nominations ==
=== Moosewood Restaurant ===
Winner:

- 2000 (America's Classics: Chef and Restaurant Awards): Moosewood Restaurant. This award recognized Moosewood Restaurant as "one of the most popular regional destinations."

=== The Moosewood Collective ===
Six of The Moosewood Collective cookbooks were nominated for James Beard Foundation Awards, and two of the six won awards.

Winners:

- 1995: Moosewood Restaurant Cooks at Home - (Vegetarian Book Awards)
- 1997: Moosewood Restaurant Low-Fat Favorites (Healthy Focus Book Awards)

Nominations

- 1991: Sundays at Moosewood Restaurant (Fruits, Vegetables, & Grains)
- 1997: Moosewood Cooks for a Crowd (Special Occasions)
- 2002: Moosewood Restaurant New Classics (Healthy Focus)
- 2004: Moosewood Restaurant Celebrates (Vegetarian/Healthy Focus)

=== Moosewood Cookbook ===
Winner:

- 2007 (Cookbook Hall of Fame: Book Awards): Moosewood Cookbook

== See also ==
- Chez Panisse
- Greens Restaurant
