= Moosewood =

Moosewood may refer to:

- Acer pensylvanicum, a species of maple known variously as striped maple, moosewood and moose maple
- Viburnum lantanoides, a species of shrub in the family Caprifoliaceae
- Dirca, a genus of deciduous shrubs in the family Thymelaeaceae, known variously as leatherwood, moosewood, ropebark and wicopy
- Moosewood Cookbook, a cookbook authored by Mollie Katzen
- Moosewood Restaurant, a restaurant in Ithaca, New York, United States
