= David Villalpando =

Mexican actor (born 1959)

- Born: January 2, 1959 (age 67); Mexico City, Mexico

David Villalpando (born January 2, 1959, in Mexico City, Mexico) is a Mexican actor. His break out role was in the film El Norte (1983).

Since then he has had small roles in US films such as The Arrival, The Mask of Zorro, and the John Sayles film Men with Guns (1997).

He was also in an episode in the television series Acapulco H.E.A.T., and has done a lot of work in Mexican cinema.

== Career ==
A native of Mexico City, Villalpando started his career at the age of 14 in the theatre play El extraño jinete by Michelle de Ghelderode.

After having worked in several amateur plays of all genres, in 1980 he starred for more than three years and 1700 performances in the play El Extensionista by Felipe Santander.

This theatre play marks the beginning of a long professional career on the Mexican stage that includes about 30 plays spanning all genres and styles of drama, from the classics to popular entertainment.

Among the plays he has starred are The two brothers by Felipe Santander, El pastelero del Rey, Alegría la lotería by Teresa Valenzuela, and Los empeños de una casa by Sor Juana Inés de la Cruz. He won a special award (Agrupación de Periodistas Teatrales APT) for his acting in this play in 1989.

Throughout his career he has represented his country in many international events, like the International Theatre Festival in Sitges, Spain (1980), the Festival Latino de Nueva York (1982), the 6th Festival Iberoamericano de Cádiz (1992) in Spain and in the Expo Sevilla 92.

In the cinema, in 1984 Villalpando was nominated as Best Actor by the Asociación de Cronistas de Espectáculos in the city of New York (ACE) for his outstanding acting as Enrique Xuncax in Gregory Nava's multi-awarded film El Norte.

El Norte was an Official US Selection in Section Un Certain Regarde in the 1984 Cannes Film Festival

El Norte was also nominated for an Academy Award in 1985 as best script and a copy of the film is preserved in the UCLA film archive and in the Library of Congress.

Villalpando has appeared in many international films like The Arrival, Men with Guns, Perdita Durango, Nazca, The Harvest, The Mask of Zorro, Daughter of the Puma, Nurses on the Line: The Crash of Flight 7 and American Family.

Villalpando has also worked as an actor and writer in television. He is the author of several well-known TV series like Cero en conducta, La casa de la risa, La escuelita Vip, Par de Ases, Fábrica de Risas and Al ritmo de la noche.

For many years he has portrayed Prof. Virolo in the little TV school Cero en Conducta and in La Escuelita VIP.

From 2007 to 2012 he was part of the Mexican TV show Se Vale. During the mid-2010s he co-hosted of the TV show Noches con Platanito produced by Estrella TV in the USA. As of 2023, he is a director of the Mexican TV series Una familia de diez, reuniting him with Jorge Ortiz de Pinedo.

== El Norte ==
Villalpando's role in El Norte meant a lot to him. He gave an interview to Lear Media about the film: what it meant to him and why the film was important. Villalpando said:

"Twenty nine years ago, the indigenous people in Guatemala, were living a cruel extermination that forced them to flee toward Mexico and the United States. This exodus lasted a decade and half a million Guatemalans made the journey to America seeking for asylum and refuge.*
