= Mollie Katzen =

American author and illustrator

- Born: October 13, 1950 (age 75); Rochester, New York
- Website: molliekatzen.com

Mollie Katzen (born October 13, 1950, in Rochester, New York, U.S.) is an American cookbook author and artist, best known for the vegetarian cookbook published by Ten Speed Press, The Moosewood Cookbook (1977), a revised version of the 1974 self-published cookbook by members of the Moosewood Restaurant. Although she is not a strict vegetarian, Katzen has published a number of additional vegetarian cookbooks such as The Enchanted Broccoli Forest (1982).

== Early life ==
Katzen was raised in Rochester, New York in a Jewish family. She has attributed her interest in vegetarian cuisine to her kashrut-observant upbringing. Throughout grade school and high school, she attended the Eastman School of Music, where she studied oboe and piano, resulting in an Eastman Preparatory School Diploma. In 1968, Katzen entered Cornell University and later received her bachelor's degree in fine arts from the San Francisco Art Institute. She is the sister of Daniel Katzen, former Boston Symphony Orchestra horn player.

== Cooking ==
In 1969, while at Cornell University, Katzen cooked at the Ithaca Seed Company, a macrobiotic café.

Katzen studied fine art at Cornell University and the San Francisco Art Institute, where she received a Bachelor of Fine Arts with Honors in Painting. One day, on her way to school, she heard a radio ad for rock-lawyer Rubin Glickman's Shandygaff restaurant Katzen took a bus from the art studio and asked to be hired. She ended up cooking and developing recipes there for two years, greatly influenced by the developing Farm-to-table ethos of the new California cuisine. Katzen returned to Ithaca in 1972 to help her brother Josh and his friends build a new restaurant, which was named Moosewood Restaurant, after a local striped maple tree. She remained there until 1978.

== Cookbooks ==
The Moosewood Cookbook became a highly influential vegetarian cookbook, with four editions (1977, 1992, 2000, 2014). In 2007 the Moosewood Cookbook won the James Beard Foundation Cookbook Hall of Fame Award. In 2017, her papers were collected by the National Museum of American History at the Smithsonian Institution.

"Mollie Katzen's Cooking Show" ran on PBS from 1995 to 2000.

In 2013, Katzen published her last cookbook, The Heart of the Plate, which she considers her best work.

== Personal life ==
From 1983 to 2022, Katzen lived in Kensington, CA. She has since returned to the East Coast.

== Works ==
- —— (1977). The Moosewood Cookbook. Ten Speed Press. ISBN 978-0913668689.
- —— (1982). The Enchanted Broccoli Forest. Ten Speed Press. ISBN 978-0898150797.
- —— (1988). Still Life with Menu. Ten Speed Press. ISBN 978-0898152562.
- —— (1992). Moosewood Cookbook: New Revised Edition. Ten Speed Press. ISBN 0-89815-490-1.
- —— (1994). Pretend Soup and Other Real Recipes. ISBN 978-1883672065.
- —— (1997). Mollie Katzen's Vegetable Heaven. ISBN 0786862688.
- —— (2000). The New Moosewood Cookbook. Ten Speed Press. ISBN 1-58008-130-4.
- —— (2002). Mollie Katzen's Sunlight Cafe. ISBN 978-0786862696.
- —— (2004). Honest Pretzels: And 64 Other Amazing Recipes for Kids. Tricycle Press. ISBN 978-1883672881.
- —— (2005). Salad People and More Real Recipes: A New Cookbook for Preschoolers and Up. Random House Children's Books. ISBN 978-1582461410.
- ——; Walter Willett (2006). Eat, Drink, and Weigh Less. ISBN 978-1401302498.
- —— (2007). The Vegetable Dishes I Can't Live Without. ISBN 978-1401322328.
- —— (2007). Mollie Katzen's Recipes: Soups. Clarkson Potter/Ten Speed. ISBN 978-1580088770.
- —— (2008). Mollie Katzen's Recipes: Salads. Ten Speed Press. ISBN 978-1580088787.
- —— (2009). Mollie Katzen's Recipes: Desserts. Ten Speed Press. ISBN 978-1580088794.
- —— (2009). Get Cooking. HarperCollins. ISBN 978-0061732430.
- —— (2013). The Heart of the Plate: Vegetarian Recipes for a New Generation. ISBN 978-0547571591.
- —— (2014). Moosewood Cookbook:40th Anniversary Edition. Ten Speed Press. ISBN 978-1-60774-739-0.
