= The Strange Tales of Oscar Zahn =

Webcomic by Tri Vuong

- Author: Tri Vuong
- Website: Oscar Zahn on Webtoon
- Current status/schedule: Completed
- Launch date: June 10, 2016
- End date: May 22, 2019
- Publisher(s): Webtoon, Ten Speed Graphic
- Genre: Supernatural

The Strange Tales of Oscar Zahn is a supernatural webcomic by Tri Vuong. It was published digitally on Webtoon from 2016 to 2019, and in print by Ten Speed Graphic since 2024. It follows Oscar Zahn, a paranormal investigator, on various adventures.

== Plot ==
The series follows the adventures of Oscar Zahn, a paranormal investigator. Due to an unspecified incident, Zahn has been reduced to the upper half of skull, but can float and interact with the world through his clothing, and is able to appear as human to non-supernatural observers. He also has a monstrous spectral creature called an "ectopus" that resides in the inside of his skull, which often breaks free of him in times of danger, putting both his enemies and his allies at risk.

The first season of the webcomic largely focuses on two separate adventures; The Last Soldier of Somme, which has Zahn facing off supernatural creatures in the Battle of the Somme, and Stardust and Soliloquies, which has him assist a former sea captain tormented by his failure to save the passengers of a sinking ship years earlier with an undersea threat linked to the incident.

The second season has a single story, The Ghost of Witch Lake, in which Zahn travels to a small community haunted by ghosts after receiving a mysterious letter.

== Print release ==
Volume	Date	Episodes	ISBN
1	September 10, 2024	1-65	ISBN 978-1984863270

== Reception ==
C. M. Ramsburg of Comic Book Resources noted the large of amount of chapters covered in the first print volume, commenting that while most prior Webtoon print adaptions only 16 to 20 episodes of their respective webcomic, the book contained 65. Ramsburg also praised the updated art made for the print release, particularly the dark and muted color scheme, saying it gave the book and "ominous atmosphere, which exudes an air of mystery and anxiety."

Publishers Weekly positively commented on the "dynamic" art style but felt that the pacing of the narrative dragged in the second half of the first volume, though they argued the art made up for it. School Library Journal described the book as "more meditative than frightening." Both reviews compared the art to the Tintin comics by Hergé. Booklist gave The Strange Tales of Oscar Zahn Volume 1 a starred review.

The New York Public Library included the first print volume in its Best New Comics of 2024 for Adults list. Additionally, Polygon included the book in its best science fiction and fantasy books of 2024, comparing it to Hellboy by Mike Mignola.
