= Ten Talents =

Ten Talents may refer to:

- Parable of the talents or minas, a parable in the Bible
- Ten Talents (cookbook), a 1968 vegetarian and vegan cookbook
