= Best Year Ever =

Best Year Ever may refer to:

- Best Year Ever, series of celebrations to recognize the Twentieth anniversary of SpongeBob SquarePants
- Best Year Ever..., television series in the I Love... format of television and compilation series
- Amelia's Best Year Ever (2003), 16th book from the Amelia's Notebooks series of children's books
- "Best Year Ever" (2022), episode from the Series 4 of Doctor Who: The Eighth Doctor Adventures

== See also ==
- Best Week Ever, American comedy series
