= Moosewood Cookbook =

Vegetarian cookbook by Mollie Katzen

The Moosewood Cookbook
- Cover of first trade edition (1977), after the initial 1974 self-published edition issued by Moosewood Restaurant in Ithaca, New York.
- Author: Mollie Katzen
- Language: English
- Subject: Vegetarian cooking
- Genre: Cookbook
- Publisher: Ten Speed Press
- Publication date: 1977 (2ed 1992, 2ed revised 2000)
- Publication place: United States
- Media type: Print
- Pages: 227
- ISBN: 0-913668-69-9 (1ed, hardcover), 1580081304 (2ed rev. softcover)
- OCLC: 3689930
- Dewey Decimal: 641.5/636 19
- LC Class: TX837 .K2593 1977
- Followed by: The Enchanted Broccoli Forest

The Moosewood Cookbook (1977) is a vegetarian cookbook by Mollie Katzen that was published by Ten Speed Press. It is a revised version of a 1974 self-published cookbook by members of the Moosewood Restaurant in Ithaca, New York.

== History ==
=== Self-published original ===
In 1974, members of the original Moosewood staff self- published a spiral bound paper-covered vegetarian cookbook (the second printing had 79 pages), with "The Moosewood Cookbook Recipes from Moosewood Restaurant in the Dewitt Mall, Ithaca, New York, Copyright 1974 Moosewood", on the title page. Page three contains a list of its creators: "Design, Editing, Hand-writing, Pen-and-ink illustrations Mollie Katzen Feedback digestion, Critical Analysis, Introduction & History Nancy McCauley Cover Drawing Judith M. Barringer Onion Photogram Kathy Morris Frontispiece: charcoal drawing Meredith (Mimi) Barchat Photographs Phyllis Boudreau Photographic Montage Phyllis Boudreau Susan B. Lent." In addition, the Postward on page 79 states: "Because we have only presented our original recipes in this book, you may not have found a recipe for something you ate at Moosewood and liked. For this reason, and because we want to share our sources of inspiration with you, it is our pleasure to acknowledge our favorite cookbooks." This statement is followed by a list of cookbooks that includes: Diet for a Small Planet, Great Meatless Meals, Recipes for a Small Planet, The Yogi Cookbook (Yogi Vithaldas and Susan Roberts), Ten Talents, The Vegetarian Epicure, Sunset Mexican Cookbook, and The Joy of Cooking.

=== Mainstream publication ===
In 1977, Ten Speed Press in California published a revised version of the 1974 self-published original, with "The Moosewood Cookbook Recipes from Moosewood Restaurant Ithaca, New York Compiled, Edited, Illustrated and Hand-Lettered by Mollie Katzen" on the title page. Page five lists additional contributors: "Frontispiece: Charcoal Drawing by Meridith Barchat Photographs by J.M. Barringer Cover Design by Meridith Barchat and Mollie Katzen." This page also contains a list of 37 names (including Katzen) introduced as: "The Moosewood People who have created the Moosewood Restaurant in Ithaca, New York from which this book has sprung."

The Moosewood Cookbook became a highly influential vegetarian cookbook, with four editions (1977, 1992, 2000, 2014).

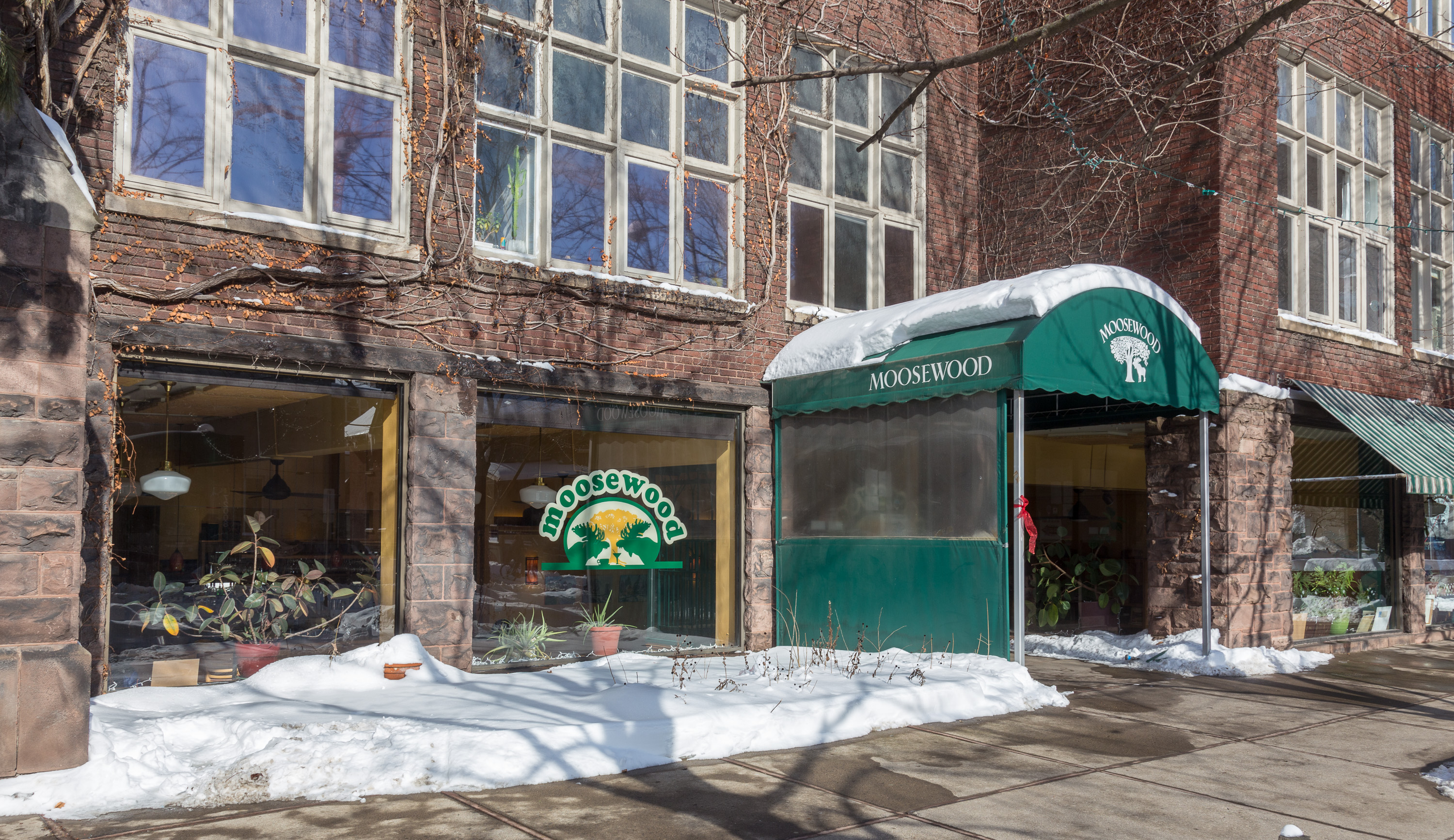
Moosewood Restaurant

== Reception ==
In 2018, New York Magazine named it to their list of best vegan and vegetarian cookbooks, saying "no chef cooking vegetables can afford not to read (it)."

In 2007, it won the Cookbook Hall of Fame, James Beard Foundation Awards.

== Bibliography ==
- Moosewood Restaurant (1974). The Moosewood Cookbook Recipes from Moosewood Restaurant In the Dewitt Mall Ithaca, New York. Moosewood Restaurant. (self-published)
- Katzen, Mollie (1977). Moosewood Cookbook. Ten Speed Press. ISBN 0-913668-68-0.
- Katzen, Mollie (1982). The Enchanted Broccoli Forest: And Other Timeless Delicacies. Berkeley, CA: Ten Speed Press. ISBN 978-0898150780.
- Katzen, Mollie (1992). Moosewood Cookbook: New Revised Edition. Ten Speed Press. ISBN 0-89815-490-1.
- Katzen, Mollie (2000). The New Moosewood Cookbook. Ten Speed Press. ISBN 1-58008-130-4.
- Katzen, Mollie (2014). Moosewood Cookbook:40th Anniversary Edition. Ten Speed Press. ISBN 978-1-60774-739-0.
