= Sheelagh Gilbey =

British television presenter

Shelaigh Gilbey
- Born: Sheelagh Nonie Gilbey; 1953 (age 72–73); Britain
- Occupations: Television presenter and actress
- Known for: Play School (presenter)

Sheelagh Nonie Gilbey (born 1953) is a British television presenter and actress.

== Biography ==
Gilbey is a former presenter on several BBC children's TV programmes, including Play School, and Play Away. She was also a long-running presenter on BBC Schools programme Zig Zag.

She also devised and appeared in the ITV series "Do It!", and played the leading part of Marianna in the 1981 film The Haunting of M directed by Anna Thomas. Gilbey also appeared as one of the celebrity contestants in the BBC's The Adventure Game. She currently teaches drama in Montessori nursery schools in west London.

== Selected publications ==
Gilbey, S., & Mansbridge, J. (1985). Do it. London: Methuen Children's.
