= James Glennon =

American cinematographer (1942–2006)

- Born: August 29, 1942; Los Angeles, California, U.S.
- Died: October 19, 2006 (aged 64); Los Angeles, California, U.S.
- Occupation: Cinematographer
- Years active: 1970–2006
- Spouse: Charmaine Witus (m. 1977)
- Children: 4
- Parent: Bert Glennon (father)

James "Jim" Glennon ASC (August 29, 1942 – October 19, 2006) was an American cinematographer.

== Career ==
Born in Los Angeles, California, Glennon was the son of cinematographer Bert Glennon and script supervisor Mary Coleman. In 1968, he received a bachelor's degree in filmmaking from UCLA. Glennon started off working in the Warner Bros. mail room where he became close with Jack Warner, being the only mail clerk not afraid of the studio head. When a set PA on Gilligan's Island didn't show up for work, Glennon was given his first on-set job. From there, he aimed to move into camera, like his father. Following the advice of Jack Warner, Glennon bought a motion picture camera and rented it out, offering his own services as operator and DP for free. Thus, Glennon initiated his career as a cinematographer with Jaws of Death (1977).

Glennon continued to work as a camera operator on other cinematographers' films, including The Conversation (1974), Ordinary People (1980), and Altered States (1980), before coming to notice as cinematographer on El Norte (1983). He worked steadily thereafter, including heading the American unit for Return of the Jedi (1983), as DP for all location scenes in the desert and forest (credited as Location Director of Photography).

He filmed My Wicked, Wicked Ways: The Legend of Errol Flynn (1985), the story of the actor his own father had photographed in four films.

In 1986, Glennon shot Flight of the Navigator. The film is notable for being one of the first Hollywood films to use extensive computer-generated imagery (CGI) effects. Specifically, it was the first use of reflection mapping and an early use of morphing in a motion picture.

In 1987, he photographed a sequence in Paul Verhoeven's RoboCop, the interior scenes in the steel mill, and was also responsible for a large number of pickup and insert shots, including all the shots showing the robotic thigh-holster.

He partnered with director Alexander Payne on three films: Citizen Ruth, Election, About Schmidt.

In 2005, his work on the HBO television series Deadwood earned him an Emmy Award. Glennon also worked as director of photography on a number of other television movies and program series, such as The West Wing, along with Carnivàle and Big Love for HBO.

== Personal life ==
Jim was one of five Glennon boys: Bert, John, Jim, Michael, and Greg.

Gannon was married to Charmaine Glennon; they had four children. He had widely varied interests. He served repeatedly as a judge in the Nicholl Fellowship in Screenwriting of the Academy of Motion Picture Arts & Sciences.

He operated Malibu Water Resources, a water aeration program that sold windmills and provided free information on how to naturally purify water. He donated windmills to those in need, including an orphanage in Vietnam.

He farmed geoduck clams in the Pacific Northwest, owned a boar hunting ranch, restored old cars, and trained parrots.

Glennon died unexpectedly on October 19, 2006, from complications (a blood clot) during surgery for prostate cancer. Jim is buried at the Santa Barbara Cemetery with his wife Charmaine.

== Selected filmography ==
=== As cinematographer ===
Year	Film	Director	Notes
1977	Jaws of Death	Richard Martin	Documentary
1981	Prisoners	Peter Werner	
1983	El Norte	Gregory Nava	Credited as Jim Glennon
1983	Return of the Jedi	Richard Marquand	Location Director of Photography
1984	Up the Creek	Robert Butler	
1985	Smooth Talk	Joyce Chopra	
1986	One More Saturday Night	Dennis Klein	
1986	Flight of the Navigator	Randal Kleiser	
1987	RoboCop	Paul Verhoeven	Uncredited
1988	A Time of Destiny	Gregory Nava	
1990	A Show of Force	Bruno Barreto	
1992	Me Myself & I	Pablo Ferro	
1996	Citizen Ruth	Alexander Payne	
1997	Best Men	Tamra Davis	
1999	The Runner	Ron Moler	
1999	Election	Alexander Payne	
2000	South of Heaven, West of Hell	Dwight Yoakam	
2000	Playing Mona Lisa	Matthew Huffman	
2001	Viva Las Nowhere	Jason Bloom	
2002	About Schmidt	Alexander Payne	
2002	Local Boys	Ron Moler	
2002	Life Without Dick	Bix Skahill	Straight-to-DVD
2003	The United States of Leland	Matthew Ryan Hoge	
2005	The Big White	Mark Mylod	
2005	Madison	William Bindley	
2006	Room 10	Jennifer Aniston; Andrea Buchanan	Short Film
