= Enrique Castillo =

American actor (born 1949)

- Born: Enrique Jimenez Castillo; December 10, 1949 (age 76); Calexico, California, U.S.
- Occupations: Film actor, writer, director, producer
- Years active: 1961–present
- Spouse: Belarmina Hernandez

Enrique Castillo (Enrique Jimenez Castillo; born December 10, 1949) is an American actor, writer, director, and producer. He founded Four Brown Hats Entertainment (FBHE) and was a founding member of the Latino Theater Company.

== Life and career ==
Castillo was born in Calexico, California, and is founding member of The Latino Theater Company. He co-wrote the company's plays Stone Wedding and August 29. In addition to the plays, he wrote and directed the film The History of The Latino Theater Company, a documentary chronicling the theater company, and co-produced the company's annual comedy fundraiser Noche de Risa y Susto.

Castillo was cast in the role of Smiley Torres in 1978 stage production of Zoot Suit, and later went on to take on the title role of Henry Reyna.

Castillo is most recognized for his role as Montana in feature film Blood In Blood Out, directed by Taylor Hackford.

In 1997, Castillo created Four Brown Hats Entertainment (FBHE), a film and theater production company. With FBHE, he adapted and directed The Last Angry Brown Hat. Following this, he wrote and directed Veteranos: A Legacy of Valor, a theater piece honoring the military contributions by Latinos in America's defense.

Among his completed feature film scripts are Yo Solo, The Cobra, Valley of the Dead, Deerdancer, and The Last Angry Brown Hat.

== Filmography ==
Year	Title	Role	Notes
1961	Raíces de piedra		
1979	240-Robert	Pepe	1 episode
1980	The Incredible Hulk	Larry / Andy	2 episodes
1980	The Waltons	Sgt. Edward 'Eddie' Ramirez	1 episode
1980	Borderline	Arturo	
1980	Fighting Back	Carlos	TV movie
1981	A Small Killing	Latin Student	TV movie
1982	American Playhouse		1 episode
1983	Losin' It	Taxi Driver #2	
1983	El Norte	Jorge	
1985	Braker	Booker	TV movie
1985	Little Treasure	Cantina Voice #2	
1985	Get Out of My Room	El Coyote	
1986	Black Moon Rising	Mechanic #1	
1987	Born in East L.A.	Coyote #1	Extended TV Cut Only (Uncredited)
1987	The Delos Adventure	Luis Vasquez	
1990	Maniac Cop 2		Voice
1992	L.A. Law	Al Ruiz	1 episode
1993	Blood In Blood Out	Montana	
1994	In the Line of Duty: The Price of Vengeance		TV movie
1994	Gambler V: Playing for Keeps	Escobar	TV movie
1995	My Family	Memo 'Bill'	
1995	Melrose Place	Ricardo Lopez	1 episode
1995	Nixon	Virgilio Gonzales, Watergate Burglar	
1996	Broken Arrow	Colonel in war room	
1996	Mars Attacks!	Hispanic Colonel	
1997	The End of Violence	Ramon	
1998	The Hi-Lo Country	Levi Gomez	
1999	No One Writes to the Colonel	Ramón	
2000	Picking Up the Pieces	Graciento	
2000	Touched by an Angel	Carlos Jimenez	1 episode
2002	Angel	Doctor	1 episode
2002	American Family	Fire Officer	2 episode
2003	10-8: Officers on Duty	Jose	1 episode
2004	Medical Investigation	Manager	1 episode
2004	In Good Company	Hector	
2006	Déjà Vu	Claire's Father	
2007	Fuego	Oscar	
2008	A Beautiful Life	Don Miguel	
2008-2010	Weeds	Cesar	25 episodes
2011	El Padrino 2	Jesse Mendoza	
2013	El teniente Amado	Johnny Abbes	
2013	Homebound	Gilberto Escamilla	
2016	Love Kills	Don Jesus	
2017	Beatriz at Dinner	Marcus	
2017	The Green Ghost	Sergio	
2023	Mayans MC	Eduardo Villar-Fuentes	
