= Daniel Katzen =

American musician

Daniel Katzen was a French horn teacher and player, and associate professor of horn at the University of Arizona's Fred Fox School of Music in Tucson. Prior to that, he was second horn in the Boston Symphony Orchestra (BSO) from April 1979 to August 2008. He was a recitalist, chamber musician, clinician and soloist and has appeared in 22 states and 25 countries in 5000 performances and master classes. He can be heard on virtually all recordings with the BSO and the Boston Pops from 1979–2000, and has also recorded with the Empire Brass and other chamber groups. Prof. Katzen taught horn at Boston University and the New England Conservatory from 1981–2008, and at California Institute of the Arts from 2000 to 2007. He has consulted with the University of California, Irvine orchestral performance program since 2000, and has performed and recorded with various Los Angeles orchestras and film studios. Among the films in which he has played are Schindler's List, E.T. the Extra-Terrestrial, Pearl Harbor, Twister, Nixon, Saving Private Ryan and Jumanji.

Previously Katzen held the positions of fourth horn with the San Diego Symphony, and second horn with the Grant Park Symphony in Chicago and the Phoenix Symphony. He also has played with the Chicago Symphony, Los Angeles Philharmonic and various orchestras in Europe and Israel.

In addition to his teaching and performing, he is known for what the Boston Globe referred to as the "legend of Daniel Katzen" for having auditioned 48 times before finally, in 1979, landing a spot with the Boston Symphony Orchestra. He has also performed all six of the Bach Suites for Solo Cello Cello Suites (Bach) from memory in live performances, in a version for horn that he transcribed. He also ran the Brass Orchestral Repertoire Class at New England Conservatory from 1996–2008.

Katzen received a B.M. "With Distinction" from Indiana University School of Music, where he was a student of Philip Farkas and Michael Höltzel and an M.M. from Northwestern University, where he studied with Dale Clevenger. He also studied under Milan Yancich and Morris Secon at the Eastman School of Music.

He is the brother of celebrated cookbook author and artist Mollie Katzen.

He died on November 5, 2026.

== Sources ==
- New England Conservatory
- CalArts
- Geoff Edgers, "6 Minutes To Shine", Boston Globe, September 4, 2005.
