= The Confessions of Amans =

1977 film by Gregory Nava

- Theatrical release poster
- Directed by: Gregory Nava
- Written by: Gregory Nava; Anna Thomas
- Produced by: Anna Thomas; Gregory Nava
- Starring: William Bryan; Michael St. John; Susannah MacMillan; Leon Liberman; Feliciano Ituero Bravo; Stephen Bateman
- Cinematography: Gregory Nava
- Edited by: Gregory Nava
- Distributed by: American Film Institute; Bauer International
- Release date: November 17, 1977 (United States)
- Running time: 88 minutes
- Country: United States
- Language: English
- Budget: $24,000

The Confessions of Amans is a 1977 American 16-mm drama film directed by Gregory Nava and written by Nava and his wife Anna Thomas.

The picture was partly funded by the American Film Institute.

== Plot ==
In medieval Spain, an itinerant student of philosophy is hired by an uneducated lord to tutor his wife, but the student falls in love with her.

== Production ==
The film was produced in Spain and on an estimated budget of $24,000, according to Roger Ebert. Nava used English stage performers. To conserve money, Nava and Thomas used costumes and props remaining from Samuel Bronston's El Cid. Film locations included the castles of ancient Segovia, Spain.

== Cast ==
- William Bryan as Amans
- Michael St. John as Absalom
- Susannah MacMillan as Anne
- Leon Liberman as Arnolfo
- Feliciano Ituero Bravo as Nicholas
- Stephen Bateman as Landlord

== Release ==
The Confessions of Amans was first presented in 1976 at the Chicago International Film Festival. The film opened in a limited theatrical release in New York on November 17, 1977.

== Reception ==
=== Critical response ===
The New York Times film critic Vincent Canby wrote: "The Confessions of Amans was a very beautiful film, though not an especially pretty one, a chilly, tightly disciplined tale of the tragic love affair of a young philosophy tutor and the wife of the lord of the manor. Like the great Robert Bresson, Mr. Nava appeared to be less interested in the heat of the passion of the lovers than in the succession of moral choices their passion represented."

An unsigned film review in The New York Times held that the film is "a beautiful, muted film of the kind that takes some getting used to. People seldom raise their voices or lose control of themselves. Passion is expressed discreetly in glances or in the holding of hands."

=== Awards ===
Wins

- Chicago International Film Festival: Gold Hugo Award, Best First Feature Award, 1976.
