= Who's in a Family? =

- Author: Robert Skutch
- Illustrator: Laura Nienhaus
- Publisher: Tricycle Press
- Publication date: 1995
- Pages: 32
- ISBN: 1-883672-66-X
- OCLC: 30979383

Who's in a Family? is a children's book which depicts a variety of non-traditional families, including interracial, single-parent, and families with gay and lesbian partners as parents. It intentionally emphasizes the normalcy of different family arrangements.

== Background ==
Robert Skutch is an American author born in 1925 and has published multiple books such as Journey Without Distance: The Story Behind a Course in Miracles, The Day the World Forgot, and another children's book named Albie's Trip to the Jumble Jungle. Skutch has also written for television and radio shows throughout his life In an NPR interview from 2005, Skutch says that his inspiration for writing this book was because his niece and her partner decided to start a family.

== Summary ==
The book begins by saying "a family can be made up in many different ways" and fills the first two pages of the book with illustrations of six different types of families. Skutch elaborates on this point by acknowledging that animals have families too, and includes illustrations of different animal families. Skutch uses illustrations of bird, pig, kangaroo, penguin, money, elephant, lion, dog, and bear families. Through the course of the book, Skutch designates an individual page for the many different family structures such as. depicts traditional, single-parent, same-gender, inter-racial, extended, and only-child families. The book concludes with illustrations of various family portraits and with the line, "Who's in a family? The people who love you the most."

== Analysis ==
Who's in a Family? represents some of the ways that a "family" exists today. Years ago, the perspective of a traditional family included two parents, a mom and a dad, raising their children together under one roof. However, today there are many possible variations of a family, as seen in Skutch's book. The book is suited for young children as it introduces how families can look different; it opens the door for parents and children to communicate about family differences, and more importantly, it allows for children to become educated and accepting of various family dynamics. Furthermore, this book allows parents to emphasize the practice of unconditional love for others. The book is suited for young children as it introduces how families can look different. Finally, Skutch said in his NPR interview that "the whole purpose of the book was to get the subject [of same-sex parent households] out into the minds and the awareness of children before they are old enough to have been convinced that there's another way of looking at life."

== Genre ==
Who's in A Family? is a fictional, illustrated children's book, specifically intended for kindergarten to second-grade students. This book includes traditional, single-parent, same-gender, inter-racial, extended, and only-child families. The book addresses topics related to LGBTQ, multi-race, and traditional relationships, and how these families navigate through life. Who's in a Family? contains colorful, pencil illustrations which show a diverse array of animal and human families.

== Reception ==
=== Reviews ===
In an article from the School Library Journal, Martha Topol claims that children's books like Who's in a Family? are intended to educate children on different family structures. Topol, along with an author for The Spectator, Susan Clairmont, think that this genre of book should be given to children after questions about these topics begin to arise to reassure and clarify but should not just be given to children without background knowledge or questions.

Susan Clairmont also raises the question of whether these genres of children's stories will do "more harm than good" to children who did not ask about these topics.

=== Controversy ===
The book was at the center of a controversy in the state of Massachusetts in the United States when a number of parents objected to their children being exposed to it in school, claiming that it was intended to promote a "homosexual agenda". Parents David and Tonia Parker filed a lawsuit against the Lexington school district to have their children exempted from reading the book in class. Before filing a lawsuit, David had sent various emails in order to ensure two requests from the school: (1) that he would be notified if the school assigned non-traditional literature and (2) that he would be able to opt his son out of being taught such materials. During a meeting with the Estabrook principal and with the district director of instruction, David refused to leave until his demands were met, which resulted in him being arrested for trespassing. The Parkers were ultimately unsuccessful, with the 1st Circuit Court of Appeals finally dismissing their lawsuit, noting that "the mere fact that a child is exposed on occasion in public school to a concept offensive to a parent's religious belief does not inhibit the parent from instructing the child differently". The US Supreme Court declined to hear the case.
