= The Haunting of M =

- Theatrical release poster
- Directed by: Anna Thomas
- Written by: Anna Thomas
- Produced by: Anna Thomas
- Starring: Sheelagh Gilbey; Nini Pitt; Evie Garratt; Alan Hay; Jo Scott Matthews
- Cinematography: Gregory Nava
- Edited by: Trevor Black; Michael Bockman
- Music by: Colin Wyllie
- Production company: Triangle Film Productions Ltd.
- Release date: October 1, 1979 (Chicago International Film Festival)
- Running time: 98 min
- Country: United States
- Language: English

The Haunting of M is an American 1979 independent horror film directed by Anna Thomas and starring Sheelagh Gilbey, Nini Pitt, Evie Garratt, Alan Hay, and Jo Scott Matthews. This is the only film directed by Thomas, with her husband Gregory Nava acting as a cinematographer. Thomas shot the film in a castle in Scotland inviting a little known cast. The film premiered at the Chicago International Film Festival.

== Plot ==
The film is set in the first years of the 20th century. The successful actress Halina visits the ball at her family's estate. A group photo is taken, but later she and her sister Marianna are puzzled to see a mysterious person present in the photo, whom none of them recognizes. Their estate gets haunted by the ghost of a young man that wanders through the corridors, tormenting Marianne. Their aging aunt Teresa finally recognizes the figure in the photo. Digging into the past, Halina discovers that the mysterious man was Teresa's fiance Marion, who was exiled and died under suspicious circumstances after he and Teresa unsuccessfully tried to elope. Later, Halina understands that Marion was killed by her relatives and came back for revenge.

== Cast ==
- Sheelagh Gilbey as Marianna
- Nini Pitt as Halina
- Evie Garratt as Daria
- Alan Hay as Karol
- Jo Scott Matthews as Aunt Teresa
- William Bryant as Marion
- Peter Austin as Stefan
- Ernest Bale as Stahu
- Isolde Cazelet as Yola

== Reception ==
Roger Ebert praised The Haunting of M in his review for the Chicago Sun-Times and on an episode of Sneak Previews with fellow film critic Gene Siskel (who disagreed with Ebert's enthusiastic praise for the film).
