= My Family (1995 film) =

1995 American drama film directed by Gregory Nava

Mi Familia (My Family)
- Theatrical release poster
- Directed by: Gregory Nava
- Screenplay by: Gregory Nava; Anna Thomas
- Produced by: Anna Thomas
- Starring: Jimmy Smits; Esai Morales; Eduardo Lopez Rojas; Jenny Gago; Elpidia Carrillo; Constance Marie; Edward James Olmos
- Narrated by: Edward James Olmos
- Cinematography: Edward Lachman; Jason Poteet
- Edited by: Nancy Richardson
- Music by: Film score: Mark McKenzie; Folk Music: Pepe Ávila
- Production companies: American Playhouse; American Zoetrope; Majestic Films International; Newcomb Productions
- Distributed by: New Line Cinema
- Release date: May 3, 1995 (United States)
- Running time: 126 minutes
- Country: United States
- Languages: English; Spanish
- Box office: $11.5 million

Mi Familia is a 1995 American drama film directed by Gregory Nava, written by Nava and Anna Thomas, and starring Jimmy Smits, Edward James Olmos, and Esai Morales. The film depicts three generations of a Mexican-American family who emigrated from Mexico and settled in East Los Angeles.

In 2024, the film was selected for preservation in the United States National Film Registry by the Library of Congress as being "culturally, historically, or aesthetically significant".

== Plot ==
The family's oldest son, Paco, narrates the tale.

José Sanchez, the family patriarch, makes a year-long journey on foot from Mexico to Los Angeles. He travels to Los Angeles to meet a distant relative known as El Californio, who was born in the city when it was still part of Mexico. They become fast friends and farm corn together. However, after several years, El Californio nears death. Shortly before dying, El Californio says he wants the following written on his tombstone: "When I was born here, this was Mexico, and where my body lies, this is still Mexico."

José meets and marries the love of his life, María, an American citizen. She is illegally deported to Mexico by the U.S. federal government in a mass roundup. It takes two arduous years to return with their son, Chucho, born during the travail.

Twenty years later, in 1958 or 1959, eldest daughter Irene is getting married. Chucho and Paco have grown up. New additions to the family include Toni, Guillermo "Memo", and brother Jimmy.

After the wedding a series of events seal Chucho's fate. One night at a dance hall, Chucho is dancing with his girlfriend, when his blood rival Butch Mejia harasses him. A bloody knife fight follows, with Chucho killing Butch in self-defense. Chucho flees in fear, and becomes a fugitive to the police. One night when Jimmy is playing ball with his friends, Chucho is shot dead by the Los Angeles Police Department in front of Jimmy. Other members of the family learn of Chucho's death when they hear gunshots and rush to a nearby street. As an ambulance arrives to take Chucho's body away, Paco declares in a voiceover that Chucho's whole life had been on borrowed time.

The third generation comes of age twenty years later, in the 1970s and 1980s, and faces challenges such as acculturation, assimilation, and past family problems.

Jimmy completes a stint in prison and returns home. After Chucho's death 20 years back, Jimmy followed in Chucho's angry footsteps, becoming a fugitive as well. One day, Toni visits the Sanchez home and stuns her parents with the news that she is no longer a nun and has married an ex-priest named David Ronconi. Toni and David become involved in helping political refugees. When they find out that a Salvadoran refugee, Isabel, has become a target for murder and is being held for deportation back to El Salvador, Toni convinces Jimmy to marry her so that she is able to stay in the U.S.

Jimmy is resistant to the idea of being a married man; however, Isabel slowly makes herself at home and Jimmy relents. As Jimmy works on his car listening to "I'm Your Puppet", Isabel comes up to him and changes the music in the cassette-player. She tries to get him to dance with her on the street. At first he doesn't want to, but she finally succeeds in teaching him some steps. He asks her at the end of the song, "Will you teach me how to salsa?" With this, Jimmy finally lets Isabel into his heart, and both understand that although others may not understand them, they know they really are together and finally consummate their marriage.

Isabel becomes pregnant shortly thereafter but dies after giving birth to their son, Carlitos. Enraged, Jimmy attacks the doctor whom he blames for her death, burglarizes a store, and is arrested; Carlitos is left to be raised by his grandparents. When released from prison four years later, Jimmy initially doesn't want anything to do with his son. When Jimmy finally sees Carlitos, a spirited, but trouble-making child, he is filled with joy and immediately wants to care for him. However, Carlitos hates him, believing his real father is a cowboy who lives in Texas.

Jose and Maria's middle son, Guillermo (called "Memo") purposely downplays his Mexican heritage as an adult, attends college, becomes a lawyer, and refers to himself as William, or Bill. He becomes engaged to a young white woman named Karen from an affluent family in Bel-Air. The first meeting between the two families begins well but descends into chaos when Carlitos acts up wildly, and Memo chastises Jimmy for his son's inappropriate behavior.

After Jimmy decides to change his life around for good, Carlitos accepts him and moves with him to Texas, where Jimmy has secured a good-paying factory job in San Antonio.

Empty nesters Jose and Maria reminisce about their past. Jose declares, "God has been good to us, we've been very lucky, and our life it has been very...very good". A vista of modern Los Angeles glows in the evening light.

== Cast ==
- Jimmy Smits as Santiago “Jimmy” Sánchez
  - Jonathan Hernandez as Young Jimmy Sánchez
- Edward James Olmos as Francisco “Paco” Sánchez
  - Benito Martinez as Young Paco Sánchez
- Esai Morales as Jesus "Chucho" Sánchez
- Elpidia Carrillo as Isabel Magaña Sánchez
- Enrique Castillo as Guillermo "Memo" Sánchez
  - Greg Albert as Young Memo Sánchez
- Rafael Cortés as Roberto Sánchez
- Michael DeLorenzo as Butch Mejia
- Constance Marie as Antonia “Toni” Sánchez
- Scott Bakula as David Ronconi
- Lupe Ontiveros as Irene Sánchez
  - Maria Canals as Young Irene Sánchez
- León Singer as El Californio
- Mary Steenburgen as Gloria
- Dedee Pfeiffer as Karen Gillespie
- Bibi Besch as Mrs. Gillespie
- Bruce Gray as Mr. Gillespie
- Eduardo Lopez Rojas as Jose Sánchez
  - Jacob Vargas as Young Jose Sánchez
- Jenny Gago as Maria Sánchez
  - Jennifer Lopez as Young Maria Sánchez

== Production ==
While the film was distributed by New Line Cinema, many production companies were involved in its production, including American Playhouse, Francis Ford Coppola's American Zoetrope, Majestic Films International, and Newcomb Productions. Gregory Nava has stated that the film has autobiographic overtones, but was more inspirational than authentic to his life. Nava says "A lot of the specifics came from other families when I was doing research for the film in East Los Angeles."

=== Filming ===
Filming began in 1994, and was done in both California and Mexico. California locations included Agoura Hills, Highland Park, and East Los Angeles. Mexican locations included Ocumicho, Patamba, and Pátzcuaro, all in the state of Michoacán.

== Reception ==
=== Critical response ===
Reviews were generally positive.

Roger Ebert, critic for the Chicago Sun-Times, liked the direction of the film, and wrote "Their story is told in images of startling beauty and great overflowing energy; it is rare to hear so much laughter from an audience that is also sometimes moved to tears. Few movies like this get made because few filmmakers have the ambition to open their arms wide and embrace so much life."

Film critics Frederic and Mary Ann Brussat, who write for the web based Spirituality and Practice, liked the film, the acting and the direction of the film. They wrote "My Family is a touching and often mystical portrait of a multi-generational Mexican-American family in East Los Angeles...Director Gregory Nava (El Norte) does a fine job orchestrating the many events in this emotionally resonant drama."

But not all were so kind. Caryn James, in a film review in The New York Times, wrote the film was "wildly uneven" and "offers a trite, overblown narration by Edward James Olmos and an often flagging sense of drama." She was also not happy with Nava's direction and wrote "[Nava] seems so enamored of the texture of Mexican-American life that he glides past any sense of character." James however was very complimentary of Jimmy Smits' performance.

The film holds a 79% "Fresh" score on review aggregator Rotten Tomatoes, with an average rating of 7.3/10, based on 58 reviews from professional critics. The website's critics consensus reads, "My Family's emotional impact is dulled by sentiment, but this well-acted drama strikes a universal chord with its multi-generational look at Mexican-American life."

=== Awards and honors ===
- Added to the National Film Registry in 2024.
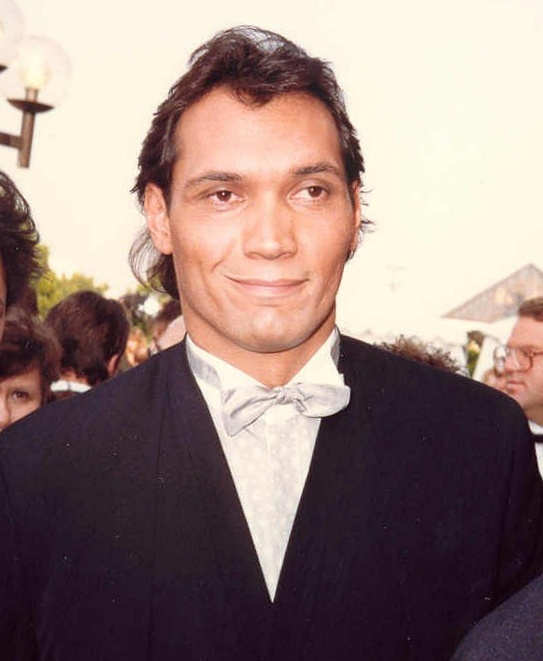
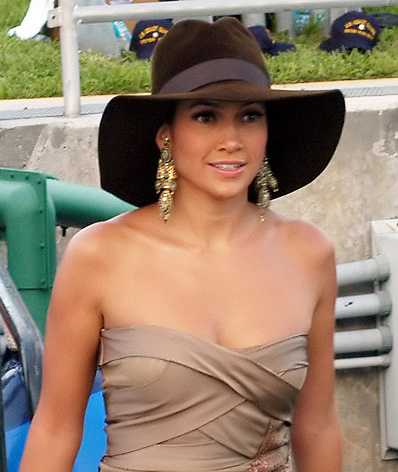
Jimmy Smits and Jennifer Lopez at the 1996 Independent Spirit Awards, having been nominated for their performances.

Wins

- NCLR Bravo Award: NCLR Bravo Award; Outstanding Feature Film, 1995
- Donostia-San Sebastián International Film Festival: OCIC Award, Gregory Nava, 1995
- Young Artist Awards: Best Young Supporting Actor - Feature Film, Jonathan Hernandez, 1996

Nominated

- Casting Society of America Awards: Best Casting for Feature Film, Best Casting for Drama Feature Film, Jane Jenkins, Janet Hirshenson, and Roger Mussenden, 1995
- Donostia-San Sebastián International Film Festival: Golden Seashell, Gregory Nava; 1995
- Academy Awards: Best Make-Up, Ken Diaz and Mark Sanchez, 1996
- Independent Spirit Awards: Best Male Lead, Jimmy Smits; Best Supporting Female, Jennifer Lopez, 1996

== Distribution ==
My Family opened in the United States in wide release on May 3, 1995. In the United Kingdom, it opened on October 6, 1995. The film was screened at a few film festivals including the Donostia-San Sebastián International Film Festival, Spain. Sales at the box-office were average. The first week's gross was $2,164,840, and the total receipts for the run were $11,079,373. It grossed just $0.4 million internationally for a worldwide total of $11.5 million. The budget of the film is estimated at $5,500,000.

A video was released April 8, 1997 and a DVD version was released on June 9, 2004 by New Line Home Entertainment. A Spanish version video was released.

== Soundtrack ==
For the original motion picture soundtrack, the producers include a cross section of Latino music, including a merengue and a mambo. The song "Angel Baby" by Rosie and the Originals is included as well, sung by Exposé vocalist Jeanette Jurado. In the movie, Jurado made a cameo as Rosie Hamlin performing the song.

A CD was released on April 25, 1995 on the Nonesuch Records label. The CD contains 14 tracks, including the main title theme written by Mark McKenzie and Pepe Avila. Gregory Nava wrote the liner notes for the CD. Composer Mark McKenzie also released Con Passione (2001), a CD that contains various compositions he has written for films including seven tracks for My Family.

=== Track listing ===
#	Title
1.	"Main Title Theme from My Family (Mark McKenzie & Pepe Avila)
2.	"Rosa De Castilla" (Los Folkloristas)
3.	"Angel Baby" (Jeanette Jurado)
4.	"Que Rico El Mambo" (Perez Prado)
5.	"One Summer Night" (All-4-One)
6.	"Celoso" (Maná) "Jealous Heart" w.m. by J. Carson
7.	"Down On The Riverbed" (Los Lobos)
8.	"Tu', Solo Tu'" (Pedro Infante)
9.	"I'm Your Puppet" (James & Bobby Purify)
10.	"Guavaberry" (Juan Luis Guerra)
11.	"Bachata Rosa" (Juan Luis Guerra)
12.	"Konex, Konex" (Los Folkloristas)
13.	"Senorita" (Juan Luis Guerra)
14.	"Zappa Mambo" (Banda Machos)
15.	"Flor De Canela" (Gerado Tamez and Mark McKenzie)
