= The End of August =

- Theatrical release poster
- Directed by: Bob Graham
- Written by: Leon Elswit; Gregory Nava; Eula Seaton; Anna Thomas
- Based on: The Awakening by Kate Chopin
- Produced by: Warren Jacobson; Sally Sharp
- Starring: Sally Sharp; Lilia Skala; David Marshall Grant; Paul Roebling; Paul Shenar; John McLiam; Mark Linn-Baker; Patricia Barry
- Cinematography: Robert Elswit
- Edited by: Jay Cassidy
- Music by: Shirley Walker
- Production companies: Quartet Films; Sewanee Productions
- Distributed by: Quartet Films
- Release dates: November 19, 1981 (United Kingdom); September 1982 (United States)
- Running time: 105 min
- Country: United States
- Language: English

The End of August is a 1981 American drama film directed by Bob Graham and written by Leon Elswit, Gregory Nava, Eula Seaton, and Anna Thomas. The film is based on the 1899 novel The Awakening by Kate Chopin. The films explores such themes as female awakening, marital roles, independence, societal constraints.

== Plot ==
In the turn-of-the-century city of New Orleans, Edna Pontellier's awakening to her identity beyond that of a wife and mother sets her on a transformative path of self-exploration. This journey profoundly impacts not only her own existence but also the lives of those close to her. Caught between her familial responsibilities and a deep yearning for passion, she is drawn first to the admiring affection of the young Robert, and later to the allure of the gallant Arobin. As her reality takes on the hazy texture of a dream, she is ultimately forced to confront the inevitable return to waking life.

== Cast ==
- Sally Sharp as Edna
- Lilia Skala as Mlle. Reisz
- David Marshall Grant as Robert
- Paul Roebling as Leonce
- Paul Shenar as Arobin
- John McLiam as Colonel
- Mark Linn-Baker as Victor LeBrum
- Patricia Barry as Mrs. Merriman

== Reception ==
A reviewer of Time Out wrote: "Another earnest attempt by film-makers gripped by that proselytising zeal which affects those who read good novels... Regrettably, the film finds no satisfactory substitute for reflective insights into the female mind, condemning the well-acted characters to a two-dimensional existence and inadvertently relegating Chopin's work to the genre of 'local colourist' from which she endeavoured to escape. A potboiler."
