= Marissa Moss =

American children's book author (born 1959)

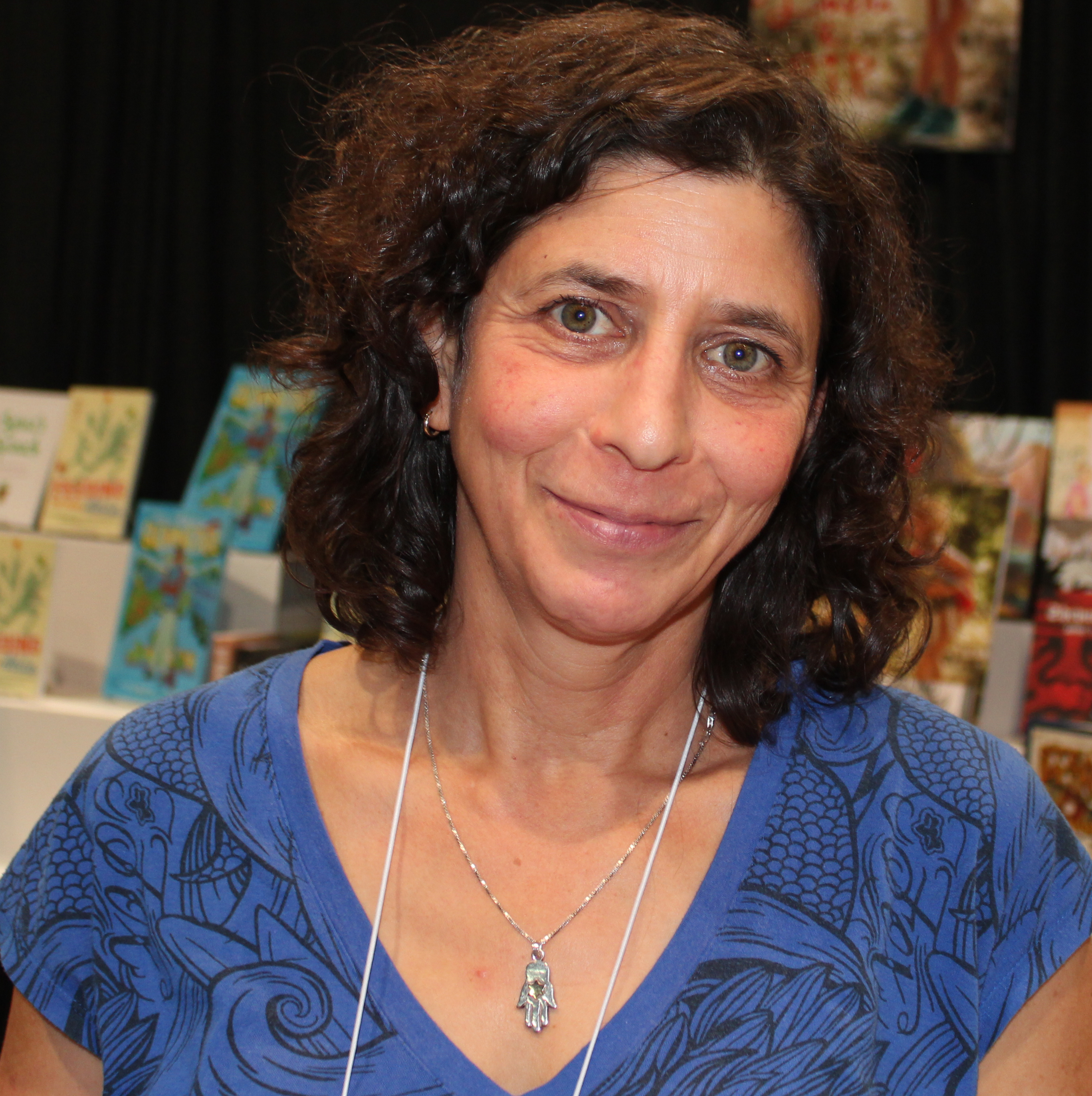
- Moss in 2014.
- Born: September 29, 1959 (age 66); Jeannette, Pennsylvania, United States
- Occupation: Writer
- Writing career
- Genre: Children's books
- Notable work: Amelia's notebooks
- Website: marissamoss.com

Marissa Moss (born September 29, 1959, Jeannette, Pennsylvania) is an American children's book author.

== Work ==
Moss's work spans the many ages of a child. She started her first career making picture books. Amelia's Notebook was her first deviation from that format. This book is the format of a journal or diary and is penned in a black and white composition notebook. Moss herself says that she loves this format that she stumbled upon because it allows her to explore the world through a child's eyes. In fact, Moss says, "The things that happened to Amelia really happened to me--from the fire in the school to the marshmallows on the ceiling — though the names have been changed because my sister is mad enough at me already!"

Other books in this series, which traces Amelia's life through the years, are: Amelia Writes Again, Amelia Hits the Road, Amelia Takes Command, The All New Amelia, My Notebook (with help from Amelia), Luv, Amelia, Luv Nadia, Amelia's Family Ties, Amelia Works It Out!, Oh Boy, Amelia!, Amelia Lends a Hand, Amelia's Best Year Ever, Amelia's Book of Notes & Note Passing, Amelia's Sixth Grade Notebook, Dr. Amelia's Boredom Survival Guide, Madame Amelia Tells All, toddler time Amelia's Bully Survival Guide, Amelia's Guide to Gossip: The Good, the Bad, and the Ugly, Amelia's 5th-Grade Notebook, Amelia's School Survival Guide, Amelia's Most Unforgettable Embarrassing Moments and Amelia's Must-Keep Resolutions For The Best Year Ever!. Still to come in the series and slated for publication in 2007 are: The All-New Amelia, Amelia Tells All, Amelia's 7th-Grade Notebook, and Vote 4 Amelia.

Moss has also written several historical journals, also in diary format. These include an account of a girl's life during the depression entitled, Rose's Journal: The Story of a Girl in the Great Depression.; Rachel's Journal: The Story of a Pioneer Girl; Emma's Journal: The Story of a Colonial Girl; Hannah's Journal: The Story of an Immigrant Girl; and Galen: My Life in Imperial Rome...

Earlier in her career, Moss wrote and illustrated several children's books not in journal format. These include Who Was It?, After School Monster, Want to Play?, But Not Kate, Regina's Big Mistake, Mel's Diner, In America, and The Ugly Menorah, although most of these are now out of print.

Moss has also written books illustrated by C.F. Payne: True Heart, Brave Harriet: The First Woman to Fly the English Channel, and Mighty Jackie: The Strikeout Queen.

Moss illustrated G is For Googol: A Math Alphabet Book, which was written by David Schwartz. She has also written the ‘Mira’s Diary’ series.

Moss has reviewed children's books with New York Journal of Books since 2017.

== Personal life ==
Moss first submitted a book for publication at the age of nine. She attended the University of California, Berkeley and graduated in 1979. Moss studied art history in graduate school for two years and then attended the California College of Arts and Crafts to study the publishing world. She, like most artists and authors, received many rejections before finally breaking into print with her book, One, Two, Three & Four. No More? published by Houghton Mifflin in 1988. Moss currently resides in the San Francisco Bay Area.

== Awards ==
=== 2023 ===
- Sydney Taylor Notable Book for Middle Grade: The Woman Who Split the Atom: The Life of Lise Meitner

=== 2017 ===
- California Young Reader Medal: Barbed Wire Baseball

=== 2015 ===
- Washington State Student Award for Informational Text: Barbed Wire Baseball

=== 2014 ===
- ALA Notable Book: Barbed Wire Baseball
- Museum of Tolerance Once Upon A World Children's Book Award: Barbed Wire Baseball

=== 2013 ===
- California Book Award: Barbed Wire Baseball
- California Reading Association Eureka Honor Book: Barbed Wire Baseball

=== 2012 ===
- California Book Award: A Soldier's Secret

=== 2005 ===
- Selected for the 2005-2006 Louisiana Young Readers' Choice Award Master List: Mighty Jackie: the Strike-out Queen
- Placed on the Chickadee Award Master List for 2005-2006 in the state of Maine: Mighty Jackie: the Strike-out Queen
- Selected for the 2006 Washington Children's Choice Picture Book Award Master List: Mighty Jackie: the Strike-out Queen

=== 2001 ===
- Sugarman Family Award for Jewish Children's Literature: Hannah's Journal: The Story of an Immigrant Girl
- National Parenting Publications Gold Award: Amelia's Moving Pictures (Video)
- Parent's Guide Children's Media Award: Amelia's Moving Pictures (Video)
- Parent's Guide Fiction Award: Oh Boy, Amelia

=== 2000 ===
- Sydney Taylor Notable Book for Older Readers: Hannah's Journal: The Story of an Immigrant Girl

=== 1995 ===
- Child Study Children's Book of the Year: In America
