= Anna Thomas =

German-born American film screenwriter and film producer (born 1948)

- Born: July 12, 1948 (age 78); Stuttgart, Germany
- Occupations: Screenwriter; film producer; Cookbook author
- Notable work: The Vegetarian Epicure (1972)
- Spouse: Gregory Nava (m. 1975; div. 2006)

Anna Thomas (born July 12, 1948) is a German-born American author, screenwriter, and film producer. She is best known as the author of the 1972 cookbook The Vegetarian Epicure, which was highly influential vegetarian cookbook. She is currently discipline head of the Screenwriting department at the American Film Institute.

== Background ==
Anna Thomas wrote The Vegetarian Epicure (1972) while still a film student at UCLA. It had a strong impact on the natural foods movement within the American counterculture.

She made The Haunting of M, her thesis film for her master's degree, in Scotland. It was well received by film critics as well as shown at film festivals and art houses.

Thomas married director and producer Gregory Nava in 1975.

== Cookbooks ==
- The Vegetarian Epicure, Alfred A. Knopf, 1972, 305 pages
- The Vegetarian Epicure, Book Two, Alfred A. Knopf, 1978, 401 pages
- The New Vegetarian Epicure, Alfred A. Knopf, 1996, 450 pages
- Love Soup, W.W. Norton & Company, 2009, 528 pages
- Vegan Vegetarian Omnivore: Dinner for Everyone at the Table, W.W. Norton & Company, 2016, 496 pages

== Screenwriting filmography ==
- The Confessions of Amans (1976)
- The Haunting of M (1979), also produced
- The End of August (1981)
- El Norte (1983), also produced
- A Time of Destiny (1988), also produced
- My Family/Mi Familia (1995), also produced
- Frida (2002)

== Film and writing nominations ==
- Academy Awards: Best Writing, Screenplay Written Directly for the Screen for El Norte (1983)
- Writers Guild of America: Best Screenplay Written Directly for the Screen for El Norte (1983)

== Cooking Awards and nominations ==
=== Won ===
- James Beard Foundation Award: Best Healthy Focus Cookbook for Love Soup (2010)
- James Beard Foundation Award: Cooking, Recipes, or Instruction (article) for "The Soup for Life: Eating Well (2012)

=== Nominated ===
- James Beard Foundation Award: Vegetarian, for The New Vegetarian Epicure: Menus for Families and Friends (1997)
