= Amelia's Notebooks =

Children's books by Marissa Moss

- Cover of Amelia's Notebook
- Author: Marissa Moss
- Country: United States
- Language: English
- Publisher: Tricycle Press, American Girl Simon & Schuster
- Media type: Print (hardcover and paperback)

Amelia's Notebook is a series of children's books written and illustrated by Marissa Moss. The books, targeted at children between 9 and 12, are a series of notebooks and journals written by the character Amelia, who writes about her life, thoughts, and memories. They are profusely illustrated and designed to resemble actual journals. Amelia is a character that many young people identify with. She has problems that many kids face like gossip, moving or crushes. Amelia has also written guides such as Dr. Amelia's Boredom Survival Guide, Amelia's Guide to Gossip, Amelia's Bully Survival Guide, Amelia's Easy-as-Pie Drawing Guide, a step-by-step guide on how to draw like Amelia, and My Notebook (With Help from Amelia), an Amelia-style notebook for you to use. The books have been translated into Spanish, French, Indonesian, and Chinese.

== Titles ==
=== Elementary school ===
- Amelia's Notebook (1995) 1st book
- Amelia Writes Again (1996) 2nd book
- Amelia Hits the Road / Amelia's Are-We-There-Yet Longest Ever Car Trip (1997) 3rd book
- My Notebook (with help from Amelia) (1997) 4th book
- Amelia Takes Command / Amelia's Bully Survival Guide (1998) 5th book
- Dr. Amelia's Boredom Survival Guide / Amelia's Boredom Survival Guide (1999) 6th book
- Luv, Amelia Luv, Nadia (1999) 7th book
- The All-New Amelia (1999) 8th book
- Amelia's Family Ties (2000) 9th book
- Amelia Works It Out (2000) 10th book
- Amelia's Easy-as-Pie Drawing Guide (2000) 11th book
- Madame Amelia Tells All / Amelia Tells All (2001) 12th book
- Oh Boy, Amelia! (2001) 13th book
- Amelia Lends a Hand (2002) 14th book
- Amelia's School Survival Guide (2002) 15th book
- Amelia's Best Year Ever / Amelia's 5th-Grade Notebook (2003) 16th book

=== Middle school ===
- Amelia's 6th-Grade Notebook (2005)
- Amelia's Most Unforgettable Embarrassing Moments (2005)
- Amelia's Book Of Notes & Note Passing (2006)
- Amelia's Longest, Biggest, Most-Fights-Ever Family Reunion (2006)
- Amelia's Guide to Gossip (2006)
- Amelia's Must-Keep Resolutions for the Best Year Ever! (2006)
- Amelia's 7th-Grade Notebook (2007)
- Vote 4 Amelia (2007)
- Amelia's Itchy-Twitchy, Lovey-Dovey Summer at Camp Mosquito (2008)
- Amelia's Guide to Babysitting (2008)
- Amelia's Science Fair Disaster (2008)
- Amelia's Middle School Survival Guide (2009)
- Amelia's Cross-My-Heart, Hope-to-Die Guide to the Real, True You! (2010)
- Amelia's BFF (2011)
- Amelia's Summer Survival Guide (2011)
- Amelia's Boy Survival Guide (2012)
- Amelia's Back-to-School Survival Guide (2012)
- Amelia's Middle School Graduation Yearbook (2015)
