= American Family (2002 TV series) =

- Genre: Drama
- Created by: Gregory Nava
- Starring: Edward James Olmos; Sônia Braga; Esai Morales; Kurt Caceres; Constance Marie; Rachel Ticotin; AJ Lamas; Raquel Welch; David Villalpando
- Composer: Steve Kaminski
- Country of origin: United States
- Original language: English
- No. of seasons: 2
- No. of episodes: 35

Production
- Executive producers: Eric L. Gold; Bob Greenblatt; David Janollari; Barbara Martinez Jitner
- Producers: Gregory Nava; Jay Sedrish
- Camera setup: Single-camera
- Running time: 45 minutes
- Production companies: El Norte Productions; KCET; The Greenblatt Janollari Studio; Fox Television Studios

Original release
- Network: PBS
- Release: January 23, 2002 – May 31, 2004

American Family, sometimes called American Family: Journey of Dreams, is an American television drama series created by Gregory Nava that follows the lives of a Latino family in Los Angeles. The series aired on PBS from January 23, 2002 to May 31, 2004. This was the first broadcast television drama series featuring a predominantly Latino cast. It also was the first original primetime American episodic drama to air on PBS in nearly a decade—since the series I'll Fly Away moved to the network.

== Production ==
Nava initially created the series for CBS, which passed on the pilot. PBS picked up 12 remaining episodes for its first season. The second season aired in mid-2004 with a slight name change. When it had initially aired in January 2002, it was simply known as American Family. Nava envisioned the second season as an epic story in 13 parts that featured current events as well as how the family was involved in the Mexican Revolution.

Edward James Olmos plays Jess Gonzalez, a Korean War veteran and barber with a cranky disposition as well as five adult children. He and his wife Berta (Sônia Braga) seek a better life for their children. Conrado is a medical school student, who, at the end of the first season, enlists in the Army.

== Themes ==
The series addressed the ongoing war in Iraq head-on. In its first episodes Conrado is set to deploy to Kuwait. Melanie McFarland, television critic for the Seattle Post-Intelligencer, stated that "Gregory Nava ventures into territory no other scripted television show has meaningfully addressed -- the Iraq War. Since audiences seek escapism in their shows instead of more reminders that U.S. soldiers are still dying over in Iraq, shying from the topic might be understandable. Network TV is ailing right now, and anything which might be perceived as too heavy to draw in viewers probably wouldn't fly."

In an interview with Bill Moyers during the airing of the series, Nava was asked if he was not angry that Latinos were invisible during prime-time television. "I think we’re reaching a point right now where Latinos are moving from the fringes into the mainstream of American life. And our time has come right now for us to make our contribution to this country," he said. "So it doesn’t make me angry; I just see it as a challenge. And I think that as a population and as a community we have to rise to that challenge."

== Cast ==
- Edward James Olmos as Jess Gonzalez
- Sônia Braga as Berta Gonzalez
- Esai Morales as Esteban Gonzalez
  - Michael Peña as Teenage Esteban
- Kurt Caceres as Conrado Gonzalez
  - Nicholas Gonzalez as Teenage Conrado
- Constance Marie as Nina Gonzalez
  - Aimee Garcia as Teenage Nina
- Rachel Ticotin as Vangie Gonzalez Taylor
  - Alisa Reyes as Teenage Vangie
- AJ Lamas as Cisco Gonzalez
- Raquel Welch as Aunt Dora
- David Villalpando as Cruz

== Episodes ==
=== Season 1 (2002) ===
No. overall	No. in season	Title	Directed by	Written by	Original release date	Prod. code
1	1	"American Family (Pilot)"	Gregory Nava	Gregory Nava	January 23, 2002	09-01-179
2	2	"The Sewing Machine"	Gregory Nava	Barbara Martinez Jitner	January 30, 2002	09-01-102
3	3	"La Estrella (The Star)"	Robert M. Young	Paula Cizmar	February 6, 2002	09-01-103
4	4	"La Llorona (The Weeping Woman): Part 1"	Gregory Nava	Gregory Nava	February 13, 2002	09-01-104
5	5	"La Llorona (The Weeping Woman): Part 2"	Gregory Nava	Gregory Nava	February 20, 2002	09-01-109
6	6	"Circle of Fire"	Leon Ichaso	Teleplay by : Lorenzo O'Brien; Story by : Gregory Nava	February 27, 2002	09-01-106
7	7	"Crash Boom Love: Part 1"	Barbara Martinez Jitner	Barbara Martinez Jitner	March 6, 2002	09-01-105
8	8	"Crash Boom Love: Part 2"	Barbara Martinez Jitner	Barbara Martinez Jitner	March 27, 2002	09-01-113
9	9	"Mexican Revolution"	Barbara Martinez Jitner	Barbara Martinez Jitner	May 1, 2002	09-01-107
10	10	"The Forgotten War"	Gregory Nava	Gregory Nava & Barbara Martinez Jitner	May 8, 2002	09-01-111
11	11	"La Cama (The Bed)"	Gregory Nava	Gregory Nava	May 15, 2002	09-01-101
12	12	"Citizen Cisco"	Barbara Martinez Jitner	Barbara Martinez Jitner	May 22, 2002	09-01-112
13	13	"Silence of God"	Gregory Nava	Teleplay by : Lorenzo O'Brien; Story by : Gregory Nava and Lorenzo O'Brien	May 29, 2002	09-01-108
14	14	"The Father"	Barbara Martinez Jitner	Teleplay by : Gregory Nava; Story by : Barbara Martinez Jitner	July 17, 2002	09-01-116
15	15	"The Glass Ceiling"	Reynaldo Villalobos	Lorenzo O'Brien	July 24, 2002	09-01-114
16	16	"The Fighting Fridas"	Perry Lang	Teleplay by : Nancy Alicia De Los Santos; Story by : Gregory Nava	July 31, 2002	09-01-115
17	17	"The Barbershop"	Edward James Olmos	Barbara Martinez Jitner	August 7, 2002	09-01-110
18	18	"The Masked Eagle: Part 1"	Barbara Martinez Jitner	Barbara Martinez Jitner	August 28, 2002	09-01-117
19	19	"The Masked Eagle: Part 2"	Barbara Martinez Jitner	Barbara Martinez Jitner	September 4, 2002	09-01-118
20	20	"The Journey: Part 1"	Gregory Nava	Teleplay by : Anna Thomas; Story by : Lorenzo O'Brien and Anna Thomas	September 11, 2002	09-01-120
21	21	"The Journey: Part 2"	Gregory Nava	Teleplay by : Anna Thomas; Story by : Lorenzo O'Brien and Anna Thomas	September 18, 2002	09-01-121
22	22	"La Casa (The House)"	Gregory Nava	Paula Cizmar Cariaga	September 25, 2002	09-01-119

=== Season 2 (2004) ===
No. overall	No. in season	Title	Directed by	Written by	Original release date	Prod. code
23	1	"The Wedding"	Unknown	Unknown	March 8, 2004	09-02-201
24	2	"The War Begins"	Unknown	Unknown	March 15, 2004	09-02-202
25	3	"The Farewell"	Unknown	Unknown	March 22, 2004	09-02-203
26	4	"A Deal with God"	Unknown	Unknown	March 29, 2004	09-02-204
27	5	"The Doors to the Past"	Unknown	Unknown	April 5, 2004	09-02-205
28	6	"The Brother"	Unknown	Unknown	April 12, 2004	09-02-206
29	7	"Shadows"	Unknown	Unknown	April 19, 2004	09-02-207
30	8	"The Searchers"	Unknown	Unknown	April 26, 2004	09-02-208
31	9	"The Burning Fire"	Unknown	Unknown	May 3, 2004	09-02-209
32	10	"Victory"	Unknown	Unknown	May 10, 2004	09-02-210
33	11	"The Child"	Unknown	Unknown	May 17, 2004	09-02-211
34	12	"The Night Sun"	Unknown	Unknown	May 24, 2004	09-02-212
35	13	"The Flowers and the Songs"	Unknown	Unknown	May 31, 2004	09-02-213

== Sources ==
- pbs.org
- Zurawik, David. Strong family drama with a Latino accent, The Baltimore Sun, January 20, 2002. Accessed August 31, 2015.
- http://www.seattlepi.com/tv/167149_tv01.html
- https://web.archive.org/web/20110927160654/http://www.uni-bielefeld.de/(cen,en)/ZIF/FG/2008Pluribus/fellows/raab_nava.pdf
- pbs.org
- The Washington Post
