= Gregory Nava =

American film director, producer and screenwriter (born 1949)

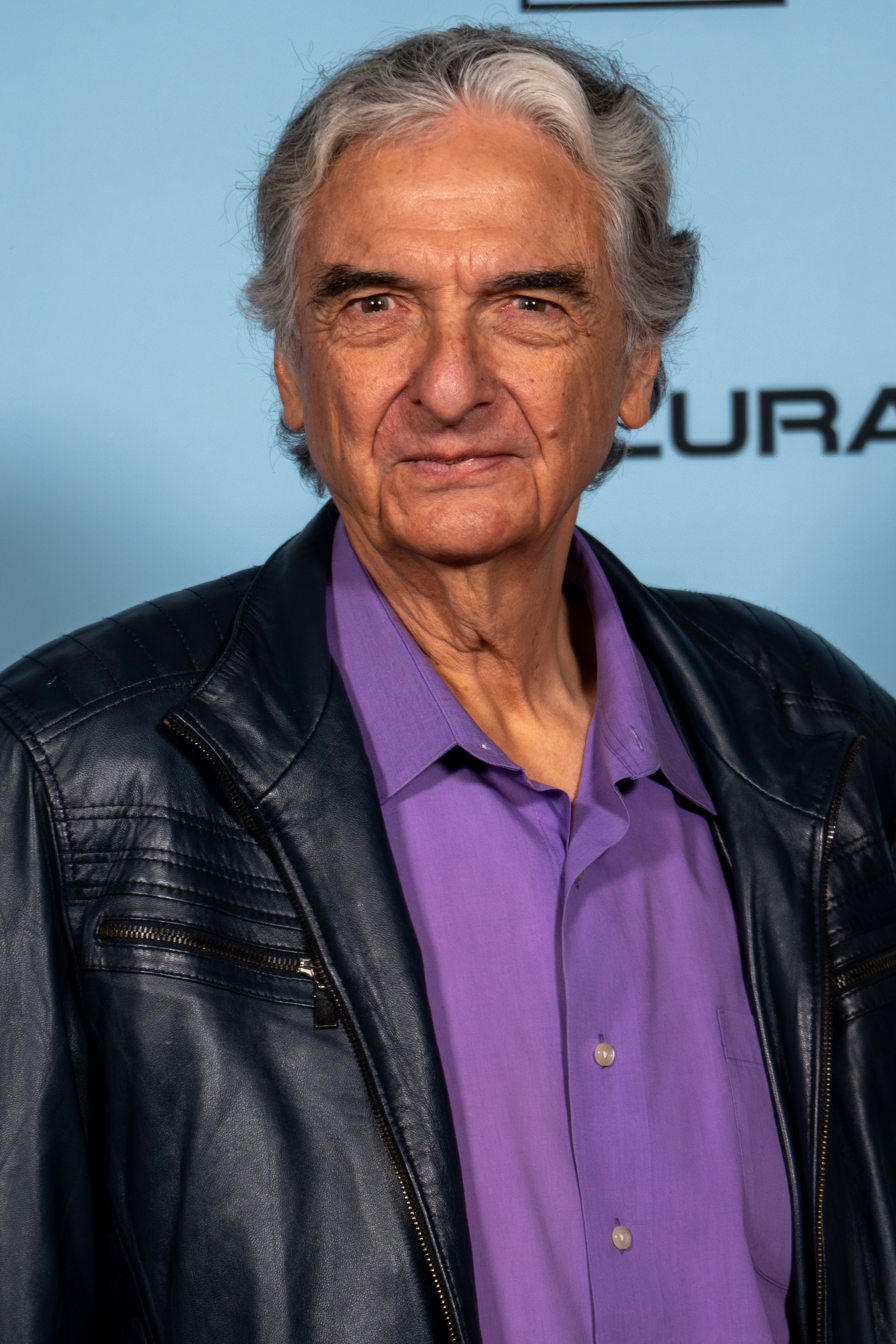
- Nava in 2025
- Born: Gregory James Nava; April 10, 1949 (age 77); San Diego, California, U.S
- Occupations: Film director; producer; writer
- Spouses: Anna Thomas (m. 1975; div. 2006) Barbara Martinez Jitner (after 2013)
- Children: 2

Gregory James Nava (born April 10, 1949) is an American film director, producer and screenwriter.

== Personal life ==
Nava was born in San Diego, of Mexican and Basque heritage. Nava graduated from St. Augustine High School in San Diego and attended film school at UCLA where he earned a Master of Fine Arts in 1976. At UCLA he directed the short film The Journal of Diego Rodriguez Silva (based on the life of García Lorca), and for this work, won the Best Dramatic Film Award at the National Student Film Festival. Nava married Anna Thomas in 1975. They collaborated on many projects and had sons Christopher (born 1984) and Teddy (born 1985). They divorced in 2006. Nava married Barbara Martinez in 2013.

== Career ==
The Confessions of Amans, Nava's first feature film, won the Best First Feature Award at the Chicago International Film Festival in 1976. Later, he came to the attention of Hollywood producers due to the success of El Norte, which garnered Nava and his wife Anna Thomas an Academy Award nomination for the screenplay. In 1995, the film was registered by the Library of Congress, National Film Registry. According to Roger Ebert, "El Norte tells the story with astonishing visual beauty, with unashamed melodrama, with anger leavened by hope. It is a Grapes of Wrath for our time."

Collaborations with his wife Thomas include The Confessions of Amans, A Time of Destiny, My Family, and Frida (screenplay).

Nava had directing success in 1997 with the film Selena, starring Jennifer Lopez.

From 2003 to 2004, Nava created and executive produced the television series American Family: Journey of Dreams for PBS. He also directed a few episodes.

In 2006, Nava produced, wrote, and directed the film Bordertown, which made its debut at the Berlin Film Festival on February 15, 2007. The film, based on true events, is a political thriller about a series of unsolved murders in Ciudad Juárez, Mexico. It stars Jennifer Lopez as a Chicago-based reporter who follows the story. The film was shot in New Mexico and Mexico.

== Filmography ==
- The Confessions of Amans (1976)
- The Haunting of M (1979)
- The End of August (1981), screenplay only
- El Norte (1983)
- A Time of Destiny (1988)
- My Family (1995)
- Selena (1997)
- Why Do Fools Fall in Love (1998)
- Frida (2002), screenplay only
- Bordertown (2007)

== Television ==
- The 20th Century: American Tapestry (1999, Documentary)
- American Family (2002–2004)

== Accolades ==
Wins

- Chicago International Film Festival: Gold Hugo Award, Best First Feature Award for The Confessions of Amans, 1976
- Montréal World Film Festival: Grand Prix des Amériques for El Norte, 1983
- Donostia-San Sebastián International Film Festival: OCIC Award for My Family, 1995
- Bravo Awards: Outstanding Feature Film for My Family, 1995
- Taos Talking Picture Festival: Cineaste Award, 1995
- ALMA Award: Outstanding Latino Director of a Feature Film, for Selena, 1997
- ALMA Award: Outstanding Latino Director of a Feature Film for Why Do Fools Fall in Love, 1998
- National Hispanic Media Coalition: Impact Award for Director of the Year, 2000
- Santa Fe Film Festival: Luminaria Award, 2006

Nominations

- Academy Awards: Best Writing, Screenplay Written Directly for the Screen for El Norte, 1984
- Writers Guild of America Award: Best Screenplay Written Directly for the Screen for El Norte, 1984
- Donostia-San Sebastián International Film Festival: Golden Seashell Award for My Family, 1995
- Emmy Awards: Outstanding Miniseries, for American Family: Journey of Dreams for the episode "Journey of Dreams", 2002
- Berlin International Film Festival: Golden Berlin Bear for Bordertown, 2007
