= El Norte (film) =

1983 film by Gregory Nava

- Theatrical release poster
- Directed by: Gregory Nava
- Screenplay by: Gregory Nava; Anna Thomas
- Story by: Gregory Nava
- Produced by: Anna Thomas
- Starring: Zaide Silvia Gutiérrez; David Villalpando
- Cinematography: James Glennon
- Edited by: Betsy Blankett Milicevic
- Music by: The Folkloristas; Malecio Martinez; Linda O'Brien; Emil Richards
- Production companies: American Playhouse; Independent Film Productions
- Distributed by: Mainline Pictures (United Kingdom); Cinecom International Films; Island Alive (United States)
- Release dates: November 10, 1983 (United Kingdom); January 11, 1984 (New York City)
- Running time: 139 minutes
- Countries: United Kingdom; United States
- Languages: English; Quiché; Spanish
- Budget: $800,000

El Norte (English: The North) is a 1983 independent drama film, directed by Gregory Nava. The screenplay was written by Gregory Nava and Anna Thomas, based on Nava's story. The movie was first presented at the Telluride Film Festival in 1983, and its wide release was in January 1984.

The drama features Zaide Silvia Gutiérrez and David Villalpando, in their first film roles, as two indigenous youths who flee Guatemala due to the ethnic and political persecution of the Guatemalan Civil War. They head north and travel through Mexico to the United States, arriving in Los Angeles, California, after an arduous journey.

The picture was partly funded by the Public Broadcasting Service (PBS), a non-profit public broadcasting television service in the United States.

El Norte received an Academy Award nomination for Best Original Screenplay in 1985. In 1995, the film was selected for preservation in the United States National Film Registry by the Library of Congress as being "culturally, historically, or aesthetically significant".

== Plot ==
The writing team of Nava and Thomas split the story into three parts:

=== Arturo Xuncax ===
The first part takes place in a small rural Guatemalan village called San Pedro and introduces the Xuncax family, a group of indigenous Mayans. Arturo is a coffee picker and his wife a homemaker. Arturo explains his worldview to his son Enrique and how the indio fares in Guatemalan life, noting that, "to the rich, the peasant is just a pair of strong arms". Arturo and his family then discuss the possibility of going to the United States where "all the people, even the poor, have their own cars".

Because of his attempts to form a labor union among the workers, Arturo and the other organizers are attacked and murdered by government troops when a co-worker is bribed to betray them—Arturo's severed head is seen hanging from a tree. When Enrique attempts to climb the tree that displays his father's head, a soldier attacks him. Enrique fights back and kills the attacker, then escapes with his sister Rosa and hides in a safe house until morning. Enrique and Rosa thus escape capture, only to learn that many of their fellow villagers have been rounded up by soldiers. The children's mother too "disappears": abducted by soldiers. So, using money given to them by their godmother, Enrique and Rosa decide to flee Guatemala, the land of their birth, and head north.

=== Coyote ===
During the second part of the film, the two teenagers flee Guatemala, travel through Mexico, and meet a Mexican coyote who guides them across the border. This section includes various comic scenes relating to mutual stereotyping among different ethnic groups; the two attempt to pass themselves off as indigenous Mexicans, failing to convince one Mexican truck driver after naming the wrong destination, but later succeeding in convincing a U.S. Border Patrol officer by copiously peppering their responses with the Mexican word for "fuck", which a neighbor had suggested was how all Mexicans speak.

Thus, Enrique and Rosa are only deported to a border town in Mexico and not to Guatemala, giving them a base for a second attempt to cross the border. After their first failed attempt to cross the "frontera", in which a man posing as a coyote deceives and attempts to rob them, they have a horrific experience when they finally cross the U.S.-Mexico border through a sewer pipe laden with rats; critic Roger Ebert noted:

The scene is horrifying, not least because it's pretty clear these are real rats. Disease-free rats purchased from a laboratory, yes, but real rats all the same, and although Gutierrez was phobic about rats, she insisted on doing her own scenes, and her panic is real.

=== El Norte ===
In the final part of the film, Rosa and Enrique discover the difficulties of living in the U.S. without official documentation. The brother and sister find work and a place to live and initially feel good about their decision. However, Rosa is nearly caught up in an immigration raid and must find a new job. Working as a domestic, she is puzzled when her Anglo employer shows her a washing machine. Enrique becomes a busboy and, as his English classes begin to improve his command of the language, is promoted to a position as a waiter's assistant. He is later approached by a businesswoman who has a better-paying job for him in Chicago as a foreman, which he initially declines; he too encounters problems when a jealous Chicano co-worker reports him to immigration, causing him to flee the restaurant and seek out the businesswoman.

When Enrique finally decides to take the position, Rosa becomes gravely ill with typhus contracted from the rat bites she received during their border crossing. When this happens, Enrique must make the tough decision of missing the flight to Chicago to be by her side, and thus loses the position. As Enrique sits by her bedside in the hospital, a dying Rosa laments that she will not live to enjoy the fruits of their harrowing journey to the U.S. Rosa sums up the film's major theme when she says to Enrique:

In our own land, we have no home. They want to kill us....In Mexico, there is only poverty. We can't make a home there either. And here in the north, we aren't accepted. When will we find a home, Enrique? Maybe when we die, we'll find a home.

After Rosa dies, Enrique is shown once again waiting with the other day-labor hopefuls in a parking lot, offering his services to a man looking for "strong arms"; reviewer Renee Scolaro Rathke observes: "It is a bitter realization that Arturo's words about the poor being nothing but arms for the rich holds true even in El Norte."

Although Enrique is temporarily employed once again, he is distracted by haunting daydreams about his sister's lost desires for a better life. The final shot in the film again shows a severed head hanging from a rope, which may be the same image used in Part I of the film; one critic has commented that a hanging, severed head is "a symbolic device used in some Latin films to signify that the character has committed suicide".

== Cast ==
- Zaide Silvia Gutiérrez as Rosa Xuncax
- David Villalpando as Enrique Xuncax
- Ernesto Gómez Cruz as Arturo Xuncax
- Alicia del Lago as Lupe Xuncax
- Lupe Ontiveros as Nacha
- Trinidad Silva as Monte Bravo
- Enrique Castillo as Jorge
- Tony Plana as Carlos
- Diane Cary as Alice Harper
- Mike Gomez as Jaime

== Background ==
The origins of El Norte are the director's experiences in San Diego, California, where he grew up. Nava came from a border family and has relatives on the other side in Tijuana, Baja California. As a youth, he crossed the border several times a week, often wondering who lived in all those cardboard shacks on the Mexican side.

For research the producers of El Norte learned about the plight of indigenous Guatemalans from years of research, much of it conducted among exiles living in Southern California. Nava said "There are hundreds of thousands of refugees from Central America in Los Angeles alone. Nobody knows the exact number, but a recent television inquiry estimated 300,000 to 400,000. In our own research, we came across a community of Mayans from Guatemala—5,000 from one village—now in Los Angeles. The original village, which is now dead, had 15,000."

Annette Insdorf of The New York Times wrote that Nava discussed the singular nature of the United States–Mexico border. Nava said:

The border is unique—the only place in the world where an industrialized first-world nation shares the border with a third-world country. In California, it's just a fence: on one side are the Tijuana slums, on the other side—San Diego. It's so graphic! This was the germ of the story.

The movie has become a staple of high school Spanish language and human geography classes throughout the United States and multiculturalism studies in college.

=== Financing ===
Nava and Anna Thomas spent two years raising money for El Norte but they did not pursue film studios or television networks because much of what makes El Norte special would have been jeopardized if a major studio had been involved in the filmmaking process.

Financing for the film was provided by PBS's American Playhouse (50%) and the rest in pre-sales. One such pre-sale was made to the United Kingdom's Channel 4.

== Themes ==
=== Magical realism ===
Magical realism is defined as a fusion between two worlds: the magical and real world. Director Gregory Nava uses magical realism through the ideas and representation to create a pre-Columbian mythic structure. These mythic depictions are represented as scared animals, flowers, and insects such as butterflies. The film's association with flowers connects to those who departed from the real world, which is known in Aztec and Mayan cosmology. Another representation, shown through Enrique and Rosa, is the pre-Columbian structure found in Mayan folklore known as Popul Vuh.

Parts of El Norte provide an example of how Latin American magical realism, primarily found in novels, has been depicted in a theatrical film. Ann Hornaday of The Washington Post wrote: "El Norte was seminal, both for its graceful blend of classical narrative and magic realism, and the power with which it brought an otherwise invisible world to life."

=== Hero's Journey ===
Hero's journey is a journey that begins with a difficult and dangerous trail towards the border to escape a reality, as the characters Enrique and Rosa do. This journey goes through three phases: departure, initiation, and return. The most prominent phase of Enrique and Rosa's journey is the departure, as they begin their journey across the border to a better world. The narrative within this film speaks on the trials and errors of the immigration experience through the crossing of borders and working as a Spanish-speaking individual.

=== Indigenous view and bigotry ===
El Norte portrays an Amerindian point-of-view and this is exemplified by the religion they follow. An example is when Rosa Xuncax sings the eulogy at the funeral of her father and its Native American-Maya religious theme. A traditional Maya belief is that life has a cyclical nature. Rosa sings in her Maya language:

We came only to sleep, to dream. All things are lent to us. We are only on Earth in passing.

Throughout El Norte young Rosa and Enrique and their family are subjected to many epithets, hatred, and bigotry due to their indigenous heritage. When the father Arturo inadvertently kills a soldier, for example, a ladino screams:

That bastard Indian killed Puma!

And, when Rosa and Enrique reach their destination in Mexico, a passenger screams at the protagonists:

We have arrived to Tijuana, you damn Indians.

=== Guatemalan exodus ===
David Villalpando, the actor who played Enrique Xuncax, gave an interview to Lear Media about what the film meant to him and why he believes the film is important. Villalpando said:

Fifteen years ago, the indigenous people in Guatemala were living a cruel extermination that forced them to flee toward Mexico and the United States. This exodus lasted a decade and half a million Guatemalans made the journey to the United States seeking for asylum and refuge...El Norte became a powerful fighting element, grew an audience, searched audiences, and left the theaters to tell its truth.

== Production ==
When Nava and his production crew were, in effect, kicked out of Mexico during the film shoot, he had to re-create a Mexican village in California. Nava said "We were filming in Mexico during the end of the López Portillo presidency, one of the last of the old-fashioned caciques to rule Mexico. One day, men with machine guns took over the set. I had guns pointed at my head. We were forced to shut down production, bribe our way out of the country, fight to get our costumes back, and start shooting again in California. Ironically, in the United States our extras were real Mayan refugees. They were the people the movie was about."

Nava tells the story that, at one point, Mexican police kidnapped their accountant and held him for ransom, and at the same time, his parents had to pose as tourists in order to smuggle exposed film out of the country in their suitcases.

=== Filming locations ===
The film was shot in Mexico and California. In Mexico, the locations were Chiapas, Morelos, México, D.F., and Tijuana. In California, the locations were San Diego and Los Angeles.

== Distribution ==
The film was released in Scotland on October 11, 1983. On December 11, 1983, the movie opened in New York City and on January 27, 1984, it opened in wide release.

It was screened in the un certain regard section at the 1984 Cannes Film Festival.

A director's cut was re-released in May 2000.

The film was re-released theatrically by Fathom Events in association with Lionsgate on September 15, 2019, followed by a digital release two days later, to commemorate its 35th anniversary, and featured new interviews with director Gregory Nava and the film's two stars, Zaide Silvia Gutierrez and David Villalpando. The film was preserved by the Academy Film Archive in 2017.

== Reception ==
=== Critical response ===
When released, the staff at Variety described the film as the "first United American independent epic."

In his four-star review, film critic Roger Ebert was pleased with Nava's and Thomas's work and likened it to a classic film of yesteryear, writing: "El Norte (1983) tells their story with astonishing visual beauty, with unashamed melodrama, with anger leavened by hope. It is a Grapes of Wrath for our time."

In a scene where the characters cross into California by means of a rat-infested sewer tunnel and emerge to a view of San Diego, Commonweal critic Tom O'Brien wrote: "... the scene sums up its rare strength".

Film critics Frederic and Mary Ann Brussat of the website Spirituality and Practice were touched by Nava and Thomas' story and the attention they give to the character's native roots, and wrote: "Nava's attention to details, particularly the aesthetic and religious beauty of Indian culture, and his sympathy for the protagonists' inner lives lift this story above its melodramatic moments and make the tale a memorable one."

Some film reviewers objected to what they considered the film's overly sad end as Vincent Canby of The New York Times, wrote: "Until its arbitrarily tragic ending, El Norte seems about to make one of the most boldly original and satirical social-political statements ever to be found in a film about the United States as a land of power as well as opportunity." However, Canby did find the acting top-rate and noted the realism they bring to their tasks. He added: "Mr. Nava does not patronize his 'little people.' This has something to do with the straight, unactorly quality of the performances, especially by Zaide Silvia Gutierrez as Rosa and David Villalpando as Enrique, two splendid Mexican actors."

Rotten Tomatoes reported that 92% of critics gave the film a positive review, based on 60 reviews.

=== Accolades ===
Wins

- Montréal World Film Festival: Grand Prix des Amériques, Gregory Nava; 1984.

Nominations

- Academy Awards: Oscar; Best Screenplay Written Directly for the Screen, Gregory Nava and Anna Thomas; 1985.
- Writers Guild of America, East: WGA Award; Best Screenplay Written Directly for the Screen; Gregory Nava and Anna Thomas; 1985.

Other distinguishments

- In 1995 the film was selected for preservation by the United States National Film Registry.

== Soundtrack ==
A soundtrack for the film was produced in France by Island/Phono-Gram. The album was produced by Gregory Nava and Danny Holloway. The CD features original music for the film by Los Folkloristas, Emil Richards, and Linda O'Brian.

It also features "Rosa's Song" sung by the actress Zaide Silvia Gutiérrez. Adagio for Strings by the American composer Samuel Barber was featured at two different points in the film. It also contains excerpts from the First Cello Concerto and De Natura Sonoris No. 1 by Polish composer Krzysztof Penderecki, the latter of which is used twice.

== Home media ==
The Criterion Collection released El Norte on DVD and Blu-ray on January 20, 2009.
