= The Vegetarian Epicure =

1972 cookbook by Anna Thomas

- Author: Anna Thomas
- Language: English
- Subject: Vegetarian cooking
- Genre: Cookbook
- Publisher: Alfred A. Knopf
- Publication date: 1972
- Publication place: United States
- Media type: Print
- Followed by: The Vegetarian Epicure, Book Two (1978), The New Vegetarian Epicure (1996)

The Vegetarian Epicure (1972) is a vegetarian cookbook by Anna Thomas that was a highly influential during the 1970s.

== History ==
Anna Thomas wrote her first cookbook The Vegetarian Epicure (1972) while still a film student at UCLA. It had a strong impact on the natural foods movement within the American counterculture. As noted in The Roanoke Times, "for many of the young people turning to vegetarianism in the late 1960s and early 1970s, Anna Thomas was the guru in their kitchens." Thomas later said that while she was a student at UCLA, she "wasn't eating much meat," and thus was focusing on vegetarian cooking. However, she states that there "weren't any good vegetarian cookbooks then. So I was just making things up in 1968 and '69, and somebody said, `Gee, Anna, you're such a good cook, you should write a cookbook.' And when you are 19 or 20 you say, `Yeah, OK, I think I will,' and then you do." The success of the book was due to the fact that it turned away from the ascetic approach found in American vegetarian cookbooks, and its ability to introduce pleasure to American vegetarian meals.

Thomas published a sequel called The Vegetarian Epicure, Book Two in 1978. The update of the original, The New Vegetarian Epicure, was published in 1996.

== Awards and nominations ==
=== Nominated ===
- James Beard Foundation Award: Vegetarian: The New Vegetarian Epicure: Menus for Families and Friends (1997).

== Bibliography ==
- The Vegetarian Epicure Alfred A. Knopf, 1972, 305 pages. ISBN 0-394-71784-8.
- The Vegetarian Epicure, Book Two Alfred A. Knopf, 1978, 401 pages. ISBN 0-394-73415-7.
- The New Vegetarian Epicure Alfred A. Knopf, 1996, 450 pages. ISBN 0-679-76588-3.
