= Ten Speed Press =

American publishing house

- Parent company: Crown Publishing Group (Random House)
- Founded: 1971; 55 years ago
- Founder: Phil Wood
- Country of origin: United States
- Publication types: Books
- Imprints: Lorena Jones, 4 Color, Watson-Guptill
- Official website: crownpublishing.com/ten-speed-press

Ten Speed Press is a publishing house founded in Berkeley, California, in 1971 by Phil Wood. It was bought by Random House in February 2009 and became part of their Crown Publishing Group division.

Ten Speed's all-time best-seller is What Color is Your Parachute? A Practical Manual for Job-Hunters and Career-Changers by Richard N. Bolles (1972). It has been reissued in new editions and, as of 2009, has sold more than ten million copies, translated into 20 languages.

Ten Speed has published numerous other non-fiction titles, including Moosewood Cookbook, White Trash Cooking, Why Cats Paint, The Bread Baker's Apprentice, Vegetable Literacy, Yotam Ottolenghi's Jerusalem, Franklin Barbecue, and Marie Kondo's The Life-Changing Magic of Tidying Up (2014). The books are usually colorfully designed. They are sometimes published in odd shapes to match their whimsical subjects. Ten Speed Press publishes 150 books a year under all of its imprints.

== History ==
Founder Phil Wood worked with Barnes & Noble in 1962, Penguin Books in 1965, and had a senior sales position at Penguin Books in Baltimore and New York before founding Ten Speed Press in 1971.

Ten Speed's first book was Tom Cuthbertson's Anybody's Bike Book, which is still in print. It inspired the publisher's name and has sold more than a million copies.

In 1983, Ten Speed acquired Celestial Arts (Millbrae, CA), "founded in the late 1960s as a printer of rock music posters," from Gary Kurtz, a Star Wars producer.

In 2002, the company acquired Crossing Press, a publisher specializing in metaphysics, alternative lifestyles, and healing.

By 2009, the company published under its four imprints — Ten Speed Press, Celestial Arts, Crossing Press, and Tricycle Press — more than 100 new hardcovers and trade paperbacks annually, and had a backlist of more than 1,000 active titles.

Ten Speed Press was bought by Random House in February 2009 and became part of their Crown Publishing Group division. Founder Phil Wood died of cancer in December 2010.

Watson-Guptill became an imprint of Ten Speed Press under Random House in 2013, part of their Crown Publishing Group.

In 2023, a graphic imprint called Ten Speed Graphic was launched.

== Tricycle Press ==
Tricycle Press was the children's imprint of Ten Speed Press, which published the Amelia's Notebooks series, among others. Tricycle also published Who's in a Family? in 1997 and King & King in 2002, books that addressed different types of families, including those headed by gay parents. The imprint ceased publishing new books in 2011.
