= Ten Talents (cookbook) =

Vegan cookbook, first published 1968

- Author: Rosalie Hurd, Frank J. Hurd
- Language: English
- Subject: Vegetarian and vegan cuisine
- Genre: Cookbook
- Published: 1968
- Awards: Silver Medal at the 2009 Living Now Book Awards
- Website: https://tentalents.net/

Ten Talents is a vegetarian and vegan cookbook originally published in 1968 by Rosalie Hurd and Frank J. Hurd. At the time, it was one of the few resources for vegetarian and vegan cooks. The cookbook promotes Christian vegetarianism and a Bible-based diet, in keeping with teachings of the Seventh-day Adventist Church. By 1991, the 750-recipe cookbook was entering its 44th printing and had sold more than 250,000 copies. An expanded edition with more than 1,000 recipes was issued in 2012.

== Title ==
The title refers to a quote from Ellen White, a founder of the Seventh-day Adventist Church: "The one who understands the art of properly preparing food, and who uses this knowledge, is worthy of higher commendation than those engaged in any other line of work. This talent should be regarded as equal in value to ten talents", which references the Parable of the Talents.

== Description ==
The 1968 edition consisted of 750 plant-based, whole food recipes for adults and infants, along with glossaries of natural ingredients, tables of equivalents, nutritional information charts, natural remedies, and an outline of the Seventh-Day Adventist "prescription for health", or Christian vegetarianism. The book promotes a diet based on the Bible, and the covers of the various editions all depict author Hurd reading from a Bible.

Numerous recipes using soybean products such as soy pulp, soy milk powder, and soy flour are featured. According to Shurtleff and Aoyagi, Ten Talents is the first cookbook to feature recipes for soy milk ice cream shakes and the earliest to have a recipe for soy sour cream. Only one chapter includes recipes with animal products—namely, milk and eggs—"for those who are in the transitional period", the authors note.

The book published some of the first recipes for granola, familia and cashew milk. It used nutritional yeast and soy sauce for flavor. It relied heavily on loaves, fritters, and patties.

== Publishing history ==
The cookbook was originally self-published in May 1968. It was updated in 1985; at that time it was published by College Press of Collegedale, Tennessee. In 1991, it was entering its 44th printing and had sold more than 250,000 copies. The cookbook was expanded in 2012 to encompass more than 1,000 recipes. In 2014 the cookbook was in its 48th printing. It has always been published in a spiral binding. Jonathan Kauffman, writing in Hippie Food (2018), said it sold hundreds of thousands of copies.

== Reception ==
In 1971 the Santa Cruz Sentinel called the book "one of the very few completely natural foods cookbooks", and in 1977 the North American Vegetarian Society recommended the book as an encyclopedia of vegetarian cooking.

In 1994 Vegetarian Times named it to their list of "Cookbooks You Can't Live Without" as a runner-up to the category of "Best Cookbooks for Beginners", saying it had been one of the few resources for vegetarian cooks in the late 1960s and early 1970s and was still one of the best general references.

The 2004 Dietitian's Guide to Vegetarian Diets called it the classic Seventh-day Adventist cookbook. In 2017 Washington Post Food Editor Joe Yonan listed it as one of three "must-have classic vegetarian cookbooks". Vegan teacher and cookbook author Victoria Moran wrote that it was one of only two vegan cookbooks she had been able to find when she first started exploring veganism in the 1970s.

=== Critical reviews ===
In 1976 Connie I. Dahlke, Chief Therapeutic Dietician at Boulder Memorial Hospital, sent a letter reviewing the book to the bookstore manager at the Colorado Conference of Seventh-Day Adventists in Denver; copies had been forwarded to hospital and university nutrition and home economics department heads and to the authors. The letter contained a 21-point negative review of the cookbook and asked that it be removed from sale. Among the criticisms were the book's preference for raw sugar and honey over brown sugar and refined white sugar; the claim that "sunflower seeds, almonds and coconut are 'valuable sources' of Vitamin D... when in fact they contain no Vitamin D"; and an assertion that "monstrous statements about the ingredients of ice cream... and objections to meat eating... reveal emotionalism and poor judgment". The authors reportedly responded to the criticisms by "making many changes" in the text before the next reprinting.

A 1977 article in Canadian Adventist Messenger said that a review by dieticians, pharmacists, and physicians found the dietary and medical advice contained in the book was unsound and advised readers to view it with caution. A subsequent article in the same source said the book was being re-edited to clarify the information.

== Awards ==
The cookbook won a Silver Medal in the Cooking/Natural category at the 2009 Living Now Book Awards.

== Authors ==
Rosalie Hurd (b. April 1937) is a nutritionist and home economist. Frank Hurd (b. March 1936) is a doctor of chiropractic and medicine. They are Seventh-day Adventists and proponents of Christian vegetarianism, and met at Atlantic Union College, a now-defunct Seventh-day Adventist institution. At the time of the book's first publication they lived in Chisholm, Minnesota, and ran a health-food store and sold a breakfast cereal called "Get Up and Go". As of 2014 they lived in Fountain City, Wisconsin.

== Sources ==
- Shurtleff, William; Aoyagi, Akiko (2012). History of Roasted Whole Soy Flour (Kinako), Soy Coffee, Coffee Alternatives, Problems with Coffee, and Soy Chocolate (1540–2012). Soyinfo Center. ISBN 9781928914525.
- Shurtleff, William; Aoyagi, Akiko (2014). History of Seventh-day Adventist Work with Soyfoods, Vegetarianism, Meat Alternatives, Wheat Gluten, Dietary Fiber and Peanut Butter (1863–2013): Extensively Annotated Bibliography and Sourcebook. Soyinfo Center. ISBN 978-1-928914-64-8.
