= Janie Fricke discography =

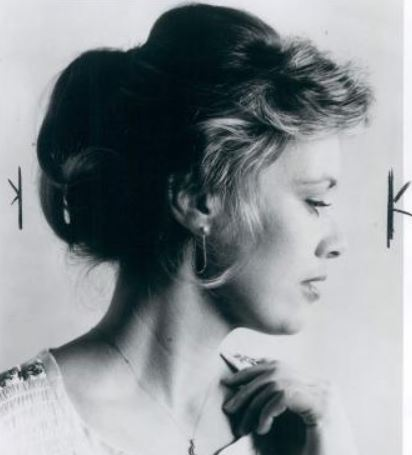
- A signed promotional photograph of Janie Fricke, 1978.
- Studio albums: 24
- Live albums: 1
- Compilation albums: 10
- Tribute albums: 1
- Singles: 44
- Music videos: 7
- Other appearances: 14

The discography of American country music artist Janie Fricke contains 24 studio albums, one live album, ten compilation albums, 44 singles, seven music videos, and 14 other appearances. Fricke was signed to Nashville's Columbia Records as a solo artist in 1977. Later that year, her debut single, "What're You Doing Tonight", reached the top-forty on the country songs chart. The following year her debut studio album, Singer of Songs, was issued. Between 1978 and 1980, Fricke issued three studio albums which resulted in two major hits: "Please Help Me, I'm Fallin" (1978) and "I'll Love Away Your Troubles for Awhile" (1979).

With a change in musical direction, Fricke began recording ballads in 1980, strengthening the success of her singles. "Down to My Last Broken Heart" and "I'll Need Someone to Hold Me (When I Cry)" were her first pair of top-ten hits on the Billboard Hot Country Singles chart. An album of the same name was also released that year, which reached the top-thirty on the Top Country Albums chart. With her sixth studio album, Fricke reached the top spot of the Billboard country chart with its second single "Don't Worry 'bout Me Baby" (1982). This would start a series of number-one country singles during this period. It Ain't Easy (1982), her seventh studio record, reached number fifteen on the Top Country Albums list and spawned three number-one hits: "It Ain't Easy Bein' Easy", "He's a Heartache (Looking for a Place to Happen)", and "Tell Me a Lie".

With the inclusion of more up-tempo material, Fricke reached the number one spot two more times in 1983 and 1984 with "Let's Stop Talkin' About It" and "Your Heart's Not in It". Fricke also collaborated with Merle Haggard in 1984 on "A Place to Fall Apart", which reached number one on the country songs chart. In 1986, her eleventh studio album Black and White was issued and became her highest-charting record on the Top Country Albums list. Its lead single "Always Have, Always Will" reached the number one spot also and became her final top ten hit. Fricke released three more studio albums for Columbia Records until 1989, all of which did not produce any major hits. Labor of Love (1989) spawned her final-charting Billboard single called "Give 'em My Number", which peaked at number forty-three. While performing in Branson, Missouri during the 1990s, Fricke released two Gospel-inspired studio albums: Crossroads: Hymns of Faith (1992) and Now & Then (1993). With her own recording label, she released Bouncin' Back (2000), her nineteenth studio album. Via her own label she would issue two more studio albums in the 2000s decade She has since released a live album in 2002 and a studio album of Christmas material in 2020.

== Albums ==
=== Studio albums ===
List of studio albums, with selected chart positions and other relevant details
Title	Album details	Peak chart positions	
Title	Album details	US Cou.	CAN Cou.
Singer of Songs	Released: May 1978; Label: Columbia; Formats: LP	—	—
Love Notes	Released: March 1979; Label: Columbia; Formats: LP	—	—
From the Heart	Released: November 1979; Label: Columbia; Formats: LP	—	10
Nice 'n' Easy (with Johnny Duncan)	Released: October 1980; Label: Columbia; Formats: LP, cassette	—	—
I'll Need Someone to Hold Me When I Cry	Released: November 1980; Label: Columbia; Formats: LP, cassette	28	—
Sleeping with Your Memory	Released: September 1981; Label: Columbia; Formats: LP, cassette	42	—
It Ain't Easy	Released: September 1982; Label: Columbia; Formats: LP, cassette	15	—
Love Lies	Released: October 1983; Label: Columbia; Formats: LP, cassette	10	—
The First Word in Memory	Released: August 1984; Label: Columbia; Formats: LP, cassette	17	—
Somebody Else's Fire	Released: June 1985; Label: Columbia; Formats: LP, cassette	21	—
Black & White	Released: July 1986; Label: Columbia; Formats: LP, CD, cassette	1	—
After Midnight	Released: April 1987; Label: Columbia; Formats: LP, CD, cassette	29	—
Saddle the Wind	Released: July 1988; Label: Columbia; Formats: LP, CD, cassette	64	—
Labor of Love	Released: July 1989; Label: Columbia; Formats: LP, CD, cassette	64	—
Great Movie Themes	Released: 1991; Label: Stonebird; Formats: CD	—	—
Janie Fricke	Released: 1991; Label: Intersound; Formats: CD	—	—
Crossroads: Hymns of Faith	Released: August 15, 1992; Label: Branson; Formats: Cassette, CD	—	—
Now & Then (re-recordings)	Released: April 15, 1993; Label: Branson; Formats: Cassette, CD	—	—
Bouncin' Back	Released: October 10, 2000; Label: JMF; Formats: Cassette, CD	—	—
Tributes to My Heroes	Released: 2003; Label: JMF; Formats: CD	—	—
The Bluegrass Sessions (Note: In 2012, The Bluegrass Sessions was re-released on New Music Deals and re-titled Country Side of Bluegrass.)	Released: August 17, 2004; Label: DM; Formats: CD, music download	—	—
Golden Legends: Janie Fricke (re-recordings)	Released: February 28, 2006; Label: Madacy; Formats: CD, music download	—	—
Roses & Lace	Released: 2008; Label: JMF; Formats: CD	—	—
A Cowgirl Country Christmas	Released: September 25, 2020; Label: Self-Released; Formats: CD	—	—
"—" denotes a recording that did not chart or was not released in that territory.

=== Live albums ===
List of live albums, showing relevant details
Title	Album details
Live at Billy Bob's Texas	Released: April 2, 2002; Label: Smith; Formats: CD

=== Compilation albums ===
List of compilation albums, with selected chart positions and other relevant details
Title	Album details	Peak chart positions
Title	Album details	US Country
Greatest Hits	Released: October 1982; Label: Columbia; Formats: LP, cassette	34
The Very Best of Janie	Released: October 1985; Label: Columbia; Formats: LP, cassette, CD	33
I Love Country	Released: 1986; Label: CBS; Formats: LP	—
17 Greatest Hits	Released: 1986; Label: Columbia; Formats: LP, CD	—
Celebration	Released: October 1987; Label: Columbia; Formats: LP, CD, cassette	63
Sweet and Sassy	Released: December 1, 1995; Label: Sony; Formats: Cassette, CD	—
Pure Country	Released: August 25, 1998; Label: Sony; Formats: CD	—
Super Hits	Released: March 2, 1999; Label: Columbia/Sony; Formats: Cassette, CD	—
Anthology	Released: March 16, 1999; Label: Renaissance; Formats: CD	—
The Essential Janie Fricke	Released: December 28, 2018; Label: Legacy; Formats: Music download	—
"—" denotes a recording that did not chart or was not released in that territory.

== Singles ==
=== As lead artist ===
List of singles, with selected chart positions and other relevant details
Title	Year	Peak chart positions		Album
Title	Year	US Coun.	CAN Coun.	Album
"What're You Doing Tonight"	1977	21	14	Singer of Songs
"Baby It's You"	1978	21	19	Singer of Songs
"Please Help Me, I'm Falling (In Love With You)"	1978	12	4	Singer of Songs
"Playin' Hard to Get"	1978	22	30	Love Notes
"I'll Love Away Your Troubles for Awhile"	1979	14	7	Love Notes
"Let's Try Again"	1979	28	52	Love Notes
"But Love Me"	1979	26	—	From the Heart
"Pass Me By (If You're Only Passing Through)"	1980	22	18	From the Heart
"He's Out of My Life" (with Johnny Duncan)	1980	17	20	Nice 'n Easy
"Down to My Last Broken Heart"	1980	2	2	I'll Need Someone to Hold Me When I Cry
"Pride"	1981	12	1	I'll Need Someone to Hold Me When I Cry
"I'll Need Someone to Hold Me (When I Cry)"	1981	4	1	I'll Need Someone to Hold Me When I Cry
"Do Me with Love"	1981	4	1	Sleeping with Your Memory
"Don't Worry 'bout Me Baby"	1982	1	8	Sleeping with Your Memory
"It Ain't Easy Bein' Easy"	1982	1	1	It Ain't Easy
"You Don't Know Love"	1983	4	3	It Ain't Easy
"He's a Heartache (Looking for a Place to Happen)"	1983	1	1	It Ain't Easy
"Tell Me a Lie"	1983	1	1	Love Lies
"Let's Stop Talkin' About It"	1984	1	1	Love Lies
"If the Fall Don't Get You"	1984	8	6	Love Lies
"Your Heart's Not in It"	1984	1	1	The First Word in Memory
"The First Word in Memory Is Me"	1984	7	5	The First Word in Memory
"She's Single Again"	1985	2	2	Somebody Else's Fire
"Somebody Else's Fire"	1985	4	4	Somebody Else's Fire
"Easy to Please"	1986	5	15	Somebody Else's Fire
"Always Have, Always Will"	1986	1	1	Black and White
"When a Woman Cries"	1986	20	10	Black and White
"Are You Satisfied?"	1987	32	25	After Midnight
"Baby You're Gone"	1987	63	45	After Midnight
"Where Does Love Go (When It's Gone)"	1988	54	47	Saddle the Wind
"I'll Walk Before I Crawl"	1988	50	—	Saddle the Wind
"The Heart"	1988	64	—	Saddle the Wind
"Love Is One of Those Words"	1989	56	63	Labor of Love
"Give 'em My Number"	1989	43	54	Labor of Love
"You Never Crossed My Mind"	1991	—	—	Janie Fricke
"I Want to Grow Old with You"	1991	—	74	Janie Fricke
"The Followers"	2020	—	—	A Cowgirl Country Christmas
"—" denotes a recording that did not chart or was not released in that territory.

=== As a featured artist ===
List of singles, with selected chart positions and other relevant details
Title	Year	Peak chart positions			Album
Title	Year	US Cou.	CAN Cou.	NZ	Album
"Come a Little Bit Closer" (Johnny Duncan with Janie Fricke)	1977	4	2	—	Come a Little Bit Closer
"On My Knees" (Charlie Rich with Janie Fricke)	1978	1	2	8	Take Me
"A Place to Fall Apart" (Merle Haggard with Janie Fricke)	1984	1	1	—	It's All in the Game
"From Time to Time (It Feels Like Love Again)" (Note: Although "From Time to Time" was first released on Larry Gatlin's album Partners, it was later included on Janie Fricke's 1987 album After Midnight.) (Larry Gatlin & the Gatlin Brothers with Janie Fricke)	1987	21	22	—	Partners
"Couldn't See the Gold" (Tommy Hunter with Janie Fricke)	1990	—	19	—	The Anniversary Sessions
"Dispatch the Angels" (Moore & Moore with Janie Fricke)	2021	—	—	—	—N/a
"—" denotes a recording that did not chart or was not released in that territory.

== Music videos ==
List of music videos, showing year released and director
Title	Year	Director(s)	Ref.
"Natural High"	1984	not available	
"The First Word in Memory Is Me"	1985	not available	
"She's Single Again"	1985	not available	
"Always Have, Always Will"	1986	Larry Boothby	
"You Never Crossed My Mind"	1991	Michael Merriman	
"I Want to Grow Old with You"	1991	Michael Merriman	
"You Don't Know Love"	2004	Deryck Ragoonanan	

== Other appearances ==
List of non-single guest appearances, with other performing artists, showing year released and album name
Title	Year	Other artist(s)	Album
"It's a Cheating Situation"	1979	Moe Bandy	Cheating Situation
"All I Want to Do in Life"	1984	George Jones	Ladies' Choice
"Natural High"	1984	Merle Haggard	It's All in the Game
"Who Cares"	1984	Ray Charles	Friendship
"What Child Is This"	1986	none	The Nashville Christmas Album
"Angels We Have Heard on High"	1992	none	Christmas in Nashville
"Two Good People with a Love Gone Bad"	1993	Vern Gosdin	Nickels and Dimes and Love
"Jingle Bells"	1993	none	Country Christmas
"Christmas Is"	1993	Johnny Paycheck	Country Christmas
"It Came Upon a Midnight Clear"	1995	none	The Most Wonderful Time of the Year
"The Foggy Dew"	1999	none	Made in America: Folk Favorites
"Pride"	2001	Ralph Emery	Ralph Emery and Friends
"Field of Dreams"	2003	Charley Pride	Comfort of Her Wings
"A Place to Fall Apart" (live)	2004	Merle Haggard	Live at Billy Bob's Texas: 'Ol Country Singer

== See also ==
- List of artists who reached number one on the U.S. country chart
- List of number-one country hits (United States)
- List of years in country music
