= The Very Best of Janie =

Compilation album by Janie Fricke
- Released: October 1985
- Recorded: 1982 – 1985
- Studio: The Bennett House; Soundshop Studio
- Genre: Country-pop
- Label: Columbia
- Producer: Bob Montgomery

Janie Fricke chronology
Somebody Else's Fire (1985)	The Very Best of Janie (1985)	Black & White (1986)

The Very Best of Janie is a compilation album by American country music artist Janie Fricke. It was released in October 1985 via Columbia Records and contained ten tracks of previously released material. The disc was the second compilation record released in Fricke's career. It featured her most successful singles released during the mid-1980s. The album reached a charting position on the American country LP's survey in 1985.

== Background, content and reception ==
Professional ratings
Review scores
Source	Rating
AllMusic	4.5/5 stars

In 1982 Columbia Records issued Janie Fricke's first compilation of Greatest Hits. Following the disc, she went on to reach further success in her music career. The material from 1982's It Ain't Easy and 1983's Love Lies, featured up-tempo production and country-pop melodies that spawned some of her biggest hits on the country charts. This prompted Columbia to issue a second Columbia compilation in 1985 titled The Very Best of Janie. The album featured her major hits recorded between 1982 and 1985. These songs were recorded at The Bennett House and the Soundshop Studio, both located in Tennessee. All songs on the project were originally produced by Bob Montgomery.

The Very Best of Janie contained a total of ten tracks, all previously recorded. Six of the album's material were originally number one singles on the Billboard country songs chart including "It Ain't Easy Bein' Easy", "Tell Me a Lie" and "Your Heart's Not in It". Three more tracks on the album originally reached the top ten on the same Billboard chart. The album was originally released in October 1985 on Columbia Records as a vinyl LP, cassette and a compact disc. In later decades, it was released to digital platforms including Apple Music. The album spent 37 weeks on the Billboard country albums chart and peaked at number 33. AllMusic's Jason Ankeny the album a 4.5 star rating and called it "one of the best anthologies of her work to date."

== Track listings ==
=== Vinyl and cassette versions ===
Side one
No.	Title	Writer(s)	Length
1.	"It Ain't Easy Bein' Easy"	Mark Gray; Shawna Harrington-Burkhart; Les Taylor	3:35
2.	"He's a Heartache (Looking for a Place to Happen)"	Larry Henley; Jeff Silbar	2:58
3.	"You Don't Know Love"	Beckie Foster; Don King	3:21
4.	"Let's Stop Talkin' About It"	Deborah Allen; Rory Bourke; Rafe Van Hoy	3:15
5.	"The First Word in Memory Is Me"	Pat Bunch; Mary Ann Kennedy; Pam Rose	3:31

Side two
No.	Title	Writer(s)	Length
1.	"Tell Me a Lie"	Mickey Buckins; Barbara Wyrick	3:32
2.	"She's Single Again"	Charlie Craig; Peter McCann	2:45
3.	"Your Heart's Not in It"	Michael Garvin; Bucky Jones; Tom Shapiro	2:48
4.	"If the Fall Don't Get You"	Sam Lorber; Dave Robbins; Van Stephenson	2:46
5.	"Ridin' High" (with Merle Haggard)	Freddy Powers; D. Reynolds	3:12

=== Compact disc and digital versions ===
The Very Best of Janie
No.	Title	Writer(s)	Length
1.	"It Ain't Easy Bein' Easy"	Gray; Harrington-Burkhart; Taylor	3:37
2.	"He's a Heartache (Looking for a Place to Happen)"	Henley; Silbar	2:58
3.	"You Don't Know Love"	Foster; King	3:22
4.	"Let's Stop Talkin' About It"	Allen; Bourke; Van Hoy	3:16
5.	"The First Word in Memory Is Me"	Bunch; Kennedy; Rose	3:34
6.	"Tell Me a Lie"	Buckins; Wyrick	3:35
7.	"She's Single Again"	Craig; McCann	2:43
8.	"Your Heart's Not in It"	Garvin; Jones; Shapiro	2:52
9.	"If the Fall Don't Get You"	Lorber; Robbins; Stephenson	2:47
10.	"Ridin' High" (with Merle Haggard)	Powers; Reynolds	3:13

== Personnel ==
All credits are adapted from the liner notes of The Very Best of Janie.

Technical personnel

- Bob Montgomery – Producer
- Danny Purcell – Mastering

== Charts ==
Weekly chart performance for The Very Best of Janie
Chart (1985–1986)	Peak position
US Top Country Albums (Billboard)	33

== Release history ==
Region	Date	Format	Label	Ref.
North America	October 1983	Vinyl	Columbia Records	
North America	October 1983	Cassette	Columbia Records	
North America	October 1983	Compact disc	Columbia Records	
North America	2016	Music download; streaming	Columbia Records	
