= Celebration (Janie Frickie album) =

Compilation album by Janie Frickie
- Released: October 1987
- Recorded: 1977 – 1986
- Genre: Country; country pop
- Label: Columbia
- Producer: Bob Montgomery; Jim Ed Norman; Billy Sherrill; Norro Wilson

Janie Frickie chronology
After Midnight (1987)	Celebration (1987)	Saddle the Wind (1988)

Celebration is a compilation album by American country artist Janie Frickie. It was released in October 1987 via Columbia Records and was the third compilation released in her career. The album was a collection of Frickie's singles released between 1977 and 1986. Many of these singles reached the top ten and number one spot on the North American country charts.

== Background, content and release ==
Janie Frickie was considered among country music's most successful artists during the 1980s, having a series of number one and top ten country songs during the decade. To help commemorate ten years of commercial success, Columbia Records released a double album of Frickie's material titled Celebration. The album was a collection of 20 songs. The album credited the song's original producers at the time of their release: Bob Montgomery, Jim Ed Norman, Billy Sherrill and Norro Wilson.

Most of Frickie's original singles were included in the track listing and were listed in chronological order. The disc begins with her debut single "What're You Doing Tonight" (1977) and includes her early releases for Columbia. It also includes seven of Frickie's number one hits on the country charts including "Don't Worry 'bout Me Baby" (1982), "Tell Me a Lie" (1983), "Your Heart's Not in It" (1984) and "Always Have, Always Will" (1986). Celebration was released in October 1987 and was Frickie's third compilation issued in her career. The disc spent 16 weeks on America's Billboard country LP's chart, peaking at number 63 in early 1988. Due to constant mispronunciations of her last name, Columbia changed the spelling from "Fricke" to "Frickie" beginning in 1986. Celebration was her first compilation to include this spelling.

== Track listing ==
=== Vinyl and cassette versions ===
Side one (LP and cassette versions)
No.	Title	Length
1.	"What're You Doing Tonight"	2:48
2.	"Please Help Me, I'm Falling (In Love with You)"	3:16
3.	"I'll Love Away Your Troubles for Awhile"	2:39
4.	"But Love Me"	2:56
5.	"Pass Me By (If You're Only Passing Through)"	2:58

Side two (LP and cassette versions)
No.	Title	Length
1.	"Cry"	2:56
2.	"Down to My Last Broken Heart"	2:28
3.	"I'll Need Someone to Hold Me (When I Cry)"	2:49
4.	"Do Me with Love"	2:49
5.	"Don't Worry 'bout Me Baby"	2:25

Side three (LP and cassette versions)
No.	Title	Length
1.	"It Ain't Easy Bein' Easy"	3:34
2.	"You Don't Know Love"	3:21
3.	"He's a Heartache (Looking for a Place to Happen)"	2:56
4.	"Tell Me a Lie"	3:34
5.	"Your Heart's Not in It"	2:50

Side four (LP and cassette versions)
No.	Title	Length
1.	"The First Word in Memory Is Me"	3:33
2.	"She's Single Again"	2:43
3.	"Somebody Else's Fire"	3:10
4.	"Easy to Please"	2:52
5.	"Always Have, Always Will"	3:40

=== Compact disc version ===
Celebration
No.	Title	Length
1.	"What're You Doing Tonight"	2:48
2.	"Please Help Me, I'm Falling (In Love with You)"	3:16
3.	"I'll Love Away Your Troubles for Awhile"	2:39
4.	"But Love Me"	2:56
5.	"Pass Me By (If You're Only Passing Through)"	2:58
6.	"Cry"	2:56
7.	"Down to My Last Broken Heart"	2:28
8.	"I'll Need Someone to Hold Me (When I Cry)"	2:49
9.	"Do Me with Love"	2:49
10.	"Don't Worry 'bout Me Baby"	2:25
11.	"It Ain't Easy Bein' Easy"	3:34
12.	"You Don't Know Love"	3:21
13.	"He's a Heartache (Looking for a Place to Happen)"	2:56
14.	"Tell Me a Lie"	3:34
15.	"Your Heart's Not in It"	2:50
16.	"The First Word in Memory Is Me"	3:33
17.	"She's Single Again"	2:43
18.	"Somebody Else's Fire"	3:10
19.	"Easy to Please"	2:52
20.	"Always Have, Always Will"	3:40

== Charts ==
Weekly chart performance for Celebration
Chart (1987–1988)	Peak position
US Top Country Albums (Billboard)	63

== Release history ==
Region	Date	Format	Label	Ref.
North America	October 1987	Vinyl	Columbia Records	
North America	October 1987	Cassette	Columbia Records	
North America	October 1987	Compact disc	Columbia Records	
