= The Bluegrass Sessions (Janie Fricke album) =

Studio album (re-recording) by Janie Fricke
- Released: August 17, 2004
- Recorded: April 24, 2004
- Studio: Quad Studios
- Genre: Bluegrass
- Length: 37:20
- Label: DM; New Music Deals
- Producer: Bill VornDick; Mark Watson

Janie Fricke chronology
Live at Billy Bob's Texas (2002)	The Bluegrass Sessions (2004)	Roses & Lace (2008)

Country Side of Bluegrass cover
- In 2012, the album was re-issued on a new label and renamed.

The Bluegrass Sessions is a studio album by American country artist Janie Fricke. It was first released on August 17, 2004, via DM Records. It was a collection of Fricke's most popular songs re-recorded in a bluegrass style. In its original release, the project received limited attention which prompted a re-release in 2012. Under the New Music Deals label, the disc was re-titled as Country Side of Bluegrass. In its new release, the album received favorable reviews from critics and music journalists alike.

== Background ==
Janie Fricke was considered by writers to be among country music's most successful female singers of the 1980s. Her singles reached the top ten of the Billboard country songs charts with regularity and she won several major industry awards. In the 1990s, she was dropped by her long-time major label and began recording music projects that were eclectic in style. This included the release of The Bluegrass Sessions. Fricke first developed an interest in bluegrass music from friend (and musician) Jim Lauderdale. He often shared bluegrass CD's with Fricke, which she became increasingly fond of. This ultimately led to the idea of re-recording her former 1980s hits in a bluegrass style as a way to get acquainted with the genre.

== Recording and content ==
The Bluegrass Sessions was recorded by Nashville producer Bill VornDick. Fricke trusted him with finding studio musicians for the project. VornDick brought in bluegrass session pickers including David Talbot, Randy Kohrs, Andy Leftwich, Glen Duncan and Jimmy Mattingly. The album's material was chosen by Fricke, along with VornDick who ultimately decided which songs from her catalog would work best for the album. "We talked about the songs and how they should feel for the album. It all came about through collaboration with Bil and the other people involved in it," she stated in 2012. The project was recorded at Quad Studios, located in Nashville, Tennessee. VornDick served as the album's main producer. Mark Watson served as its executive producer.

The album was a collection of 13 tracks. Ten of the projects 13 tracks were re-recordings of Fricke's former hits from the 1980s. It included re-workings of the number one Billboard country songs "Don't Worry 'bout Me Baby" (1981), "It Ain't Easy Bein' Easy" (1981), "He's a Heartache (Looking for a Place to Happen)" (1983), "Tell Me a Lie" (1983) and "You Don't Know Love" (1983). It also featured re-recordings of the top ten Billboard songs "Down to My Last Broken Heart" (1981), "I'll Need Someone to Hold Me (When I Cry)", "Do Me with Love" (1981), and "She's Single Again" (1985). Also included was her first top 20 single "Please Help Me, I'm Falling" (1978). The album's second track "Goodbye Broken Heart" was a new composition penned by Fricke herself. Also featured was a cover of the song "Faithless Love" and a cover of Johnny Cash's "Ring of Fire". In the original release of the record, an extra disc was included that included a music video for "You Don't Know Love" and an interview with Fricke.

== Release and critical reception ==
Professional ratings
Review scores
Source	Rating
AllMusic	4.5/5 stars

The Bluegrass Sessions was originally released on Tuesday, August 17, 2004, on DM Records Nashville. It was originally distributed as a compact disc, along with a DVD that featured two videos. A digital later appeared. The original release of the album received limited promotional, which ultimately drew little attention to the project. This prompted the album to be re-released in 2012 and re-titled as the Country Side of Bluegrass. The album's track listing was identical for the re-release with the exception of an additional DVD. It was released on January 24, 2012, through New Music Deals as a compact disc. It was later issued to digital platforms including Apple Music.

Overall, The Bluegrass Sessions and the Country Side of Bluegrass received mostly favorable reviews from critics. In its original 2004 release, the album received one review from AllMusic's Greg Adams, who gave it a 4.5 out of 5 star rating: "It is seldom a major event when a veteran performer re-records his or her old hits, but Janie Fricke's The Bluegrass Sessions is a happy exception. As the title indicates, Fricke didn't merely re-record her best-known songs -- she reinterpreted them with bluegrass instrumentation and completely new arrangements that differ considerably from the slick country-pop of the originals." In its 2012, reissue the disc received several more reviews. Jim Moulton of No Depression called it "a real refreshing sound" and found it to have an "excellent bluegrass style".

Bluegrass Unlimited found the production of the 2012 re-release to be lacking at times while overall being a "well-played album". "In an era in which contemporary bluegrass continues embracing country and pop, those comments should not suggest that this recording is weak or lacking in interest. Janie Fricke still has a wonderful, flexible voice that can slide from growling to twangy to sultry to pop, and there are a number of good tracks," they concluded. Ken Tucker of NPR gave Country Side of Bluegrass a mostly positive response in his review. While he found that Fricke's voice had aged considerably, Tucker praised the album overall and ultimately found that she performed with "compelling emotion".

== Track listings ==
=== Original release ===
The Bluegrass Sessions (2004)
No.	Title	Writer(s)	Length
1.	"You Don't Know Love"	Beckie Foster; Don King	3:02
2.	"Goodbye Broken Heart"	Janie Fricke	2:27
3.	"Do Me with Love"	John Schweers	3:17
4.	"Faithless Love"	JD Souther	3:02
5.	"He's a Heartache"	Larry Henley; Jeff Silbar	2:58
6.	"Please Help Me, I'm Falling (In Love with You)"	Hal Blair; Don Robertson	2:47
7.	"She's Single Again"	Charlie Craig; Peter McCann	2:55
8.	"I'll Need Someone to Hold Me (When I Cry)"	Wayland Holyfield; Bob McDill	2:34
9.	"Down to My Last Broken Heart"	Chick Rains	2:34
10.	"Tell Me a Lie"	Mickey Buckins; Barbara Wyrick	2:50
11.	"It Ain't Easy Bein' Easy"	Mark Gray; Shawna Harrington-Burkhart; Les Taylor	3:34
12.	"Don't Worry 'bout Me Baby"	Deborah Allen; Bruce Channel; Kieran Kane	2:39
13.	"Ring of Fire" (bonus track)	June Carter; Merle Kilgore	2:41
Total length:			37:20

DVD
No.	Title	Length
1.	"You Don't Know Love" (music video)	NA
2.	"Interview with Janie Fricke"	NA

=== Second release ===
Country Side of Bluegrass (2012)
No.	Title	Writer(s)	Length
1.	"You Don't Know Love"	Foster; King	3:02
2.	"Goodbye Broken Heart"	Fricke	2:28
3.	"Do Me with Love"	Schweers	3:17
4.	"Faithless Love"	Souther	3:02
5.	"He's a Heartache"	Henley; Silbar	2:59
6.	"Please Help Me, I'm Falling (In Love with You)"	Blair; Robertson	2:48
7.	"She's Single Again"	Craig; McCann	2:56
8.	"I'll Need Someone to Hold Me (When I Cry)"	Holyfield; McDill	2:35
9.	"Down to My Last Broken Heart"	Chick Rains	2:35
10.	"Tell Me a Lie"	Buckins; Wyrick	2:50
11.	"It Ain't Easy Bein' Easy"	Gray; Harrington-Burkhart; Taylor	3:35
12.	"Don't Worry 'bout Me Baby"	Allen; Channel; Kane	2:39
13.	"Ring of Fire" (bonus track)	Carter; Kilgore	2:41

== Personnel ==
All credits are adapted from the liner notes of The Bluegrass Sessions and AllMusic.

Musical personnel

- Janie Fricke - lead vocals
- Luke Bulla – fiddle, mandolin
- Margie Cates – backing vocals
- Chip Davis – backing vocals
- Glen Duncan – fiddle, mandolin
- Mark Fain – bass
- Johnny Hiland – guitar
- Randy Kohrs – Dobro
- Bob Mater – drums
- Jimmy Mattingly – fiddle, mandolin
- Judy Rodman – backing vocals
- David Talbot – banjo

Technical personnel

- Janie Fricke – liner notes
- Roger Gibbs – photography
- John Netti – assistant engineer
- Deryck Ragoonanan – artwork, video editor/director
- Bill VornDick – arranger, engineer, mixing, producer
- Mark Watson – executive producer

== Release history ==
Region	Date	Format	Label	Ref.
North America	August 17, 2004	Compact disc; DVD; digital	DM Records Nashville	
North America	January 24, 2012	Compact disc; digital	New Music Deals	
