= The First Word in Memory =

Studio album by Janie Fricke
- Released: August 1984
- Recorded: May 1984
- Studio: The Bennett House
- Genre: Country-pop
- Label: Columbia
- Producer: Bob Montgomery

Janie Fricke chronology
Love Lies (1983)	The First Word in Memory (1984)	Somebody Else's Fire (1985)

Singles from The First Word in Memory
- 1. "Your Heart's Not in It" Released: August 1984; 2. "The First Word in Memory Is Me" Released: December 1984

The First Word in Memory is a studio album by American country music artist Janie Fricke. It was released in August 1984 via Columbia Records and was a collection of ten tracks. The disc was the ninth studio project of Fricke's career and her third highest-charting album on the American country LP's chart. Spawned from the album were two singles: "Your Heart's Not in It" and the title track. Both songs would become major country hits in the United States and Canada.

== Background and content ==
When Janie Fricke began focusing on ballads in the early 1980s, her singles led to a breakthrough in country music. She began a string of top ten and number one country songs like "Down to My Last Broken Heart", "Tell Me a Lie" and "It Ain't Easy Bein' Easy". She would further adapt by implementing up-tempo country pop into her music with the releases It Ain't Easy (1982) and Love Lies (1983). For The First Word in Memory, Fricke would continue this same trend. Her 1984 project was recorded at The Bennett House and was produced by Bob Montgomery. It was Fricke's third album with Montgomery. The First Word in Memory contained a total of ten tracks. It included a song written by Dave Loggins called "Without Each Other". The track was a duet with singer Benny Wilson. The project also contained a song composed by Pam Tillis called "One Way Ticket", along with "In Between Heartaches" was composed by Deborah Allen.

== Release, reception and singles ==
Professional ratings
Review scores
Source	Rating
Allmusic	3/5 stars

The First Word in Memory was originally released in August 1984 on Columbia Records. It was the ninth studio collection released in her music career. The album was originally offered as both a vinyl LP and a cassette. In later years, the album was re-released to digital markets which included Apple Music. In its original release, The First Word in Memory made America's Billboard country albums survey. In total, the disc spent 32 weeks on the chart before reaching the number 17 position. It was Fricke's third highest-charting album on Billboard in her career. The album would later receive a three-star rating from AllMusic.

Two singles were spawned from The First Word in Memory. Its first single issued was "Your Heart's Not in It", which was distributed by Columbia Records in August 1984. The single spent 23 weeks on the Billboard Hot Country Songs chart and spent one week at the number one spot in December 1984. The album's title track was released by Columbia in December 1984 as the final single. The song reached the top ten of the Billboard country list in 1985, peaking at the number seven spot in the spring. In Canada, "Your Heart's Not in It" reached number one the RPM country songs chart and the title track climbed to number five.

== Track listings ==
=== Original versions ===
Side one (LP and cassette versions)
No.	Title	Writer(s)	Length
1.	"Talkin' Tough"	Wood Newton; Michael Noble; Marcus Vickers	3:32
2.	"The First Word in Memory Is Me"	Pat Bunch; Mary Ann Kennedy; Pam Rose	3:31
3.	"One Way Ticket"	Jeff Buckingham; Pam Tillis	2:54
4.	"First Time Out of the Rain"	Kerry Chater; Beckie Foster	2:58
5.	"A Love Like Ours"	Donny Lowery	2:31

Side two (LP and cassette versions)
No.	Title	Writer(s)	Length
1.	"Your Heart's Not in It"	Michael Garvin; Bucky Jones; Tom Shapiro	2:48
2.	"In Between Heartaches"	Deborah Allen; Rafe Van Hoy	2:42
3.	"Another Man Like That"	Pal Rakes; Alan Ray; Jeff Raymond	2:51
4.	"Without Each Other" (with Benny Wilson)	Dave Loggins	3:04
5.	"Take It from the Top"	David Stephenson	3:17

=== Digital version ===
Music download and streaming versions
No.	Title	Writer(s)	Length
1.	"Talkin' Tough"	Newton; Noble; Vickers	3:33
2.	"The First Word in Memory Is Me"	Bunch; Kennedy; Rose	3:34
3.	"One Way Ticket"	Buckingham; Tillis	2:56
4.	"First Time Out of the Rain"	Chater; Foster	3:02
5.	"A Love Like Ours"	Lowery	2:33
6.	"Your Heart's Not in It"	Garvin; Jones; Shapiro	2:51
7.	"In Between Heartaches"	Allen; Van Hoy	2:44
8.	"Another Man Like That"	Rakes; Ray; Raymond	2:53
9.	"Without Each Other" (with Benny Wilson)	Loggins	2:56
10.	"Take It from the Top"	Stephenson	3:20

== Personnel ==
All credits are adapted from the liner notes of The First Word in Memory.

Musical personnel

- Janie Fricke – lead and backing vocals
- Larry Byrom - acoustic and electric guitar
- Kenny Mims – electric guitar
- The Nashville String Machine – strings
- Ron Oates – keyboards
- Judy Rodman – backing vocals
- Michael Spriggs – mandolin
- James Stroud – drums
- William C. Warren – backing vocals
- Tony Wiggins – backing vocals
- Benny Wilson – backing vocals
- Bob Wray – bass

Technical personnel

- Don Cobb – second engineer
- Gene Eichelberger – first engineer
- Carl Gorodetzky – concertmaster
- Dan Ham – photography
- Bill Johnson – art direction
- Bob Montgomery – producer
- Ron Oates – arrangement
- Danny Purcell – mastering
- Dan Sellers – photography

== Charts ==
Weekly chart performance for The First Word in Memory
Chart (1984)	Peak position
US Top Country Albums (Billboard)	17

== Release history ==
Region	Date	Format	Label	Ref.
Japan	August 1984	Vinyl	CBS Records International; Sony Music Entertainment	
North America	August 1984	Vinyl	Columbia Records	
North America	August 1984	Cassette	Columbia Records	
United Kingdom	August 1984	Vinyl	CBS Records International	
North America	2016	Music download; streaming	Columbia Records	
