= Greatest Hits (Janie Fricke album) =

Greatest hits album by Janie Fricke
- Released: October 1982
- Recorded: 1977 – 1981
- Studio: Audio Media Recorders; Columbia Studio
- Genre: Country; country pop
- Label: Columbia
- Producer: Jim Ed Norman; Billy Sherrill

Janie Fricke chronology
It Ain't Easy (1982)	Greatest Hits (1982)	Love Lies (1983)

Greatest Hits is a compilation album by American country music artist Janie Fricke. It was released in October 1982 and featured ten tracks of previously recorded material. It was Fricke's first compilation disc released in her career. The collection compiled her most successful single releases between 1977 and 1981. The album reached chart positions in the United States and was reviewed by AllMusic.

== Background, content and reception ==
By 1982, Janie Fricke had been on Columbia Records for several years and began having a string of top ten hits on the North American country music charts. This began with the 1980 top five single "Down to My Last Broken Heart", followed by the 1981 number one song "Don't Worry 'bout Me Baby". Both songs were included on Fricke's first greatest hits compilation. The album compiled Fricke's most commercially successful singles recorded between 1977 and 1981. These tracks were recorded at the Audio Media Recorders studio and the Columbia Studio. Sessions recorded between 1977 and 1980 were produced by Billy Sherrill. Fricke's sessions between 1980 and 1981 were produced by Jim Ed Norman.

Greatest Hits contained a total of ten tracks. Included were Fricke's initial Columbia singles, beginning with the debut release in 1977 "What're You Doing Tonight". It also includes Fricke's top 20 songs "Please Help Me, I'm Falling (In Love with You)" and "I'll Love Away Your Troubles for Awhile". The album was released in October 1982 and was Fricke's first compilation disc issued in her career. It was available as both a vinyl LP and a cassette. The album reached number 34 on America's Billboard country albums chart in 1983. Jason Ankeny of AllMusic gave the album three stars out of five. He found the disc was missing many of Fricke's most successful songs but nonetheless highlighted some of important singles.

== Track listings ==
Side one (LP and cassette versions)
No.	Title	Writer(s)	Length
1.	"Do Me with Love"	John Schweers	2:49
2.	"Pass Me By (If You're Only Passing Through)"	H.B. Hall	2:58
3.	"Playin' Hard to Get"	John Thompson	3:27
4.	"But Love Me"	Kenny Nolan	2:59
5.	"Down to My Last Broken Heart"	Chick Rains	2:28

Side two (LP and cassette versions)
No.	Title	Writer(s)	Length
1.	"Don't Worry 'bout Me Baby"	Deborah Allen; Bruce Channel; Kieran Kane	2:26
2.	"What're You Doing Tonight"	Bob McDill	2:49
3.	"I'll Need Someone to Hold Me (When I Cry)"	Wayland Holyfield; McDill	2:47
4.	"Please Help, Me I'm Falling (In Love with You)"	Hal Blair; Don Robertson	3:15
5.	"I'll Love Away Your Troubles for Awhile"	Johnny MacRae; Bob Morrison	2:37

== Personnel ==
All credits are adapted from the liner notes of Greatest Hits.

Technical personnel

- Bill Brunt – Design
- Janie Fricke – Liner notes
- Sally Hinkle – Editing
- Bill Johnson – Art direction
- Jeff Morris – Art direction
- Jim Ed Norman – Producer (tracks A1, A5, B1, B3)
- Beverly Parker – Photography
- Billy Sherrill – Producer (tracks A2, A3, A4, B2, B4, B5)
- Virginia Team – Art direction

== Charts ==
Weekly chart performance for Greatest Hits
Chart (1982–1983)	Peak position
US Top Country Albums (Billboard)	34

== Release history ==
Region	Date	Format	Label	Ref.
North America	October 1982	Vinyl	Columbia Records	
North America	October 1982	Cassette	Columbia Records	
