= It Ain't Easy (Janie Fricke album) =

Studio album by Janie Fricke
- Released: September 1982
- Recorded: June 1982
- Studio: Soundshop Studio
- Genre: Country-pop
- Label: Columbia
- Producer: Bob Montgomery

Janie Fricke chronology
Sleeping with Your Memory (1981)	It Ain't Easy (1982)	Greatest Hits (1982)

Singles from It Ain't Easy
- 1. "It Ain't Easy Bein' Easy" Released: August 1982; 2. "You Don't Know Love" Released: January 1983; 3. "He's a Heartache (Looking for a Place to Happen)" Released: May 1983

It Ain't Easy is a studio album by American country music artist Janie Fricke. It was released in September 1982 via Columbia Records and contained ten tracks. The disc was the seventh studio release of Fricke's career and reached the top 15 of the American country LP's chart. The album spawned three singles. Two of its singles "You Don't Know Love" and "He's a Heartache (Looking for a Place to Happen)" reached the number one spot on the North American country songs charts.

== Background and content ==
Janie Fricke struggled for several years to craft a musical identity until she began focusing on ballads in 1980. Her breakthrough came later that year with the top five chart hit "Down to My Last Broken Heart". She changed towards a more up-tempo country pop musical style with her next album release It Ain't Easy. Fricke also shifted producers for the album, working for the first time with Bob Montgomery. The album was recorded in June 1982 at the Soundshop Studio located in Franklin, Tennessee. It Ain't Easy contained a total of ten tracks. Most of the album's material were new recordings. Two of these tracks were composed by songwriter Jeff Silbar ("He's a Heartache" and "Who Better Than an Angel") and one was composed by singer-songwriter Mark Gray ("It Ain't Easy Bein' Easy"). The album also included a cover of Sami Jo's country pop crossover single from 1974 "Tell Me a Lie".

== Release and reception ==
Professional ratings
Review scores
Source	Rating
Allmusic	3/5 stars

It Ain't Easy was originally released in September 1982 on Columbia Records. It was the seventh studio album released in Fricke's career. The album was originally distributed as a vinyl LP and a cassette. Both formats offered an identical track listing. It was later reissued to digital markets including Apple Music. AllMusic's Tom Roland gave the album three out of five stars in his review: "Here she sounds like a strong woman who's very familiar with heartache, and producer Bob Montgomery gives her some rockin' material to shout on." The disc spent a total of 58 weeks on the American Billboard country albums chart, peaking at number 15 in January 1983. It was Fricke's longest-charting album in her career.

== Singles ==
Three singles were spawned from the project It Ain't Easy. The first of its singles was the title track "It Ain't Easy Bein' Easy", which was issued by Columbia Records in August 1982. The song spent one week at the number one spot on the Billboard Hot Country Songs chart in November 1982. It was followed in January 1983 by the second single "You Don't Know Love". It spent 19 weeks on the Billboard country chart and reached number four by April 1983. The third and final single was "He's a Heartache (Looking for a Place to Happen)". The track was issued as a single in May 1983. The song became Fricke's fourth number one single on the Billboard country chart, spending one week there. In Canada, both the title track and "He's a Heartache" would also reach the number one spot on the RPM country list. Although originally released on Fricke's It Ain't Easy LP, "Tell Me a Lie" was officially released as a single in September 1983 to help promote her next album Love Lies.

== Track listings ==
=== Original versions ===
Side one (LP and cassette versions)
No.	Title	Writer(s)	Length
1.	"He's a Heartache (Looking for a Place to Happen)"	Larry Henley; Jeff Silbar	2:58
2.	"Who Better Than an Angel"	Tim DuBois; Sam Lorber; Silbar	3:10
3.	"It Ain't Easy Bein' Easy"	Mark Gray; Shawna Harrington-Burkhart; Les Taylor	3:35
4.	"Too Hard on My Heart"	Rendy Caneer; Eric Johnson; Bob Shelton	3:04
5.	"A Little More Love"	Bruce Channel; Didier Daily	3:33

Side two (LP and cassette versions)
No.	Title	Writer(s)	Length
1.	"Love Have Mercy"	Jan Buckingham; Wood Newton	2:35
2.	"Tell Me a Lie"	Mickey Buckins; Barbara Wyrick	3:55
3.	"You Don't Know Love"	Beckie Foster; Don King	3:21
4.	"Heart to Heart Talk"	Danny Morrison; John Reid; Johnny Slate	2:28
5.	"Tryin' to Fool a Fool"	John Schweers	2:45

=== Digital version ===
Music download and streaming
No.	Title	Writer(s)	Length
1.	"He's a Heartache (Looking for a Place to Happen)"	Henley; Silbar	3:01
2.	"Who Better Than an Angel"	DuBois; Lorber; Silbar	3:11
3.	"It Ain't Easy Bein' Easy"	Gray; Burkhart; Taylor	3:36
4.	"Too Hard on My Heart"	Caneer; Johnson; Shelton	3:07
5.	"A Little More Love"	Channel; Daily	3:34
6.	"Love Have Mercy"	Buckingham; Newton	2:35
7.	"Tell Me a Lie"	Buckins; Wyrick	4:01
8.	"You Don't Know Love"	Foster; King	3:22
9.	"Heart to Heart Talk"	Morrison; Reid; Slate	2:29
10.	"Tryin' to Fool a Fool"	Schweers	2:51

== Personnel ==
All credits are adapted from the liner notes of It Ain't Easy.

Musical and technical personnel

- Janie Fricke - lead vocals
- Janie Fricke, Judy Rodman, Bill Warren, Tony Wiggins, Benny Wilson - backing vocals
- Ron Oates - piano
- Bob Wray - bass guitar
- James Stroud - drums
- Don Gorman (track 1), Dann Huff, Kenny Mims - guitar
- Don Gorman - guitar solo (track 1)
- Shane Keister - keyboards

== Charts ==
Weekly chart performance for It Ain't Easy
Chart (1982–1983)	Peak position
US Top Country Albums (Billboard)	15

== Accolades ==
Year	Nominee / work	Award	Result	Ref.
1983	Country Music Association Awards	Album of the Year for It Ain't Easy	Nominated	

== Release history ==
Region	Date	Format	Label	Ref.
North America	September 1982	Vinyl	Columbia Records	
North America	September 1982	Cassette	Columbia Records	
United Kingdom	September 1982	Vinyl	CBS Records International	
North America	2016	Music download; streaming	Columbia Records	
