= The Bluegrass Sessions =

The Bluegrass Sessions is the name of several albums:

- The Bluegrass Sessions (Lynn Anderson album)
- The Bluegrass Sessions (Janie Fricke album)
- The Bluegrass Sessions (Merle Haggard album)
- The Bluegrass Sessions: Tales from the Acoustic Planet, Vol. 2
