= Sleeping with Your Memory =

Studio album by Janie Fricke
- Released: September 1981
- Recorded: June 1981
- Studio: Audio Media Recorders
- Genre: Country-pop
- Label: Columbia
- Producer: Jim Ed Norman

Janie Fricke chronology
I'll Need Someone to Hold Me When I Cry (1981)	Sleeping with Your Memory (1981)	It Ain't Easy (1982)

Singles from Sleeping with Your Memory
- 1. "Do Me with Love" Released: November 1981; 2. "Don't Worry 'bout Me Baby" Released: April 1982

Sleeping with Your Memory is a studio album by American country music artist Janie Fricke. It was released in September 1981 via Columbia Records and contained 11 tracks. It was the sixth studio album of Fricke's music career and spawned two singles: "Do Me with Love" and "Don't Worry 'bout Me Baby". Both songs reached chart positions on the North American country charts. The album itself also reached charting positions in the United States.

== Background and content ==
Janie Fricke had been signed to Columbia Records since 1977 but found it challenging to find a musical identity. This resulted in her early singles only reaching minor chart positions and receiving limited radio airplay. In the early 1980s, Fricke started focusing on ballads which ultimately led to her breakthrough with 1981's "Down to My Last Broken Heart". She would continue having a string of hits during the decade and release a series of commercially successful albums. Among these albums was Sleeping with Your Memory, which she recorded with produced Jim Ed Norman. It was Fricke's second album produced by Norman. The project was recorded in Nashville, Tennessee at Audio Media Recorders in June 1981.

Sleeping with Your Memory was a collection of 11 tracks that contained new recordings as well as covers of previously released songs. Several ballads were featured on the collection including the title track. Among the final tracks was "Always", which was composed by Fricke's then-husband Randy Jackson. A cover version of Simon & Garfunkel's "Homeword Bound" was also included and it featured Ricky Skaggs playing fiddle. A cover version of Yvonne Elliman's "Love Me" was also part of the project.

== Release, reception and singles ==
Professional ratings
Review scores
Source	Rating
Allmusic	3/5 stars

Sleeping with Your Memory was originally released in September 1981 on Columbia Records. It was Fricke's sixth studio release of her career. The album was originally distributed as a vinyl LP and a cassette with identical track listings. In later decades, it was reissued to digital platforms including Apple Music. The disc spent a total of 27 weeks on the American Billboard country albums survey, peaking at number 42 in March 1982. It was Fricke's second album to reach a Billboard chart. Greg Adams of AllMusic gave the album a three-star rating, calling it "an impressively consistent album that matches its hits with material nearly as good."

Sleeping with Your Memory spawned two singles that received radio airplay and reached chart positions. Its first single spawned was the track "Do Me with Love", which was released in November 1981 on Columbia Records. The single spent 19 weeks on the Billboard Hot Country Songs chart and peaked at number four in 1982. It was followed by the April 1982 release of the track "Don't Worry 'bout Me Baby". It spent 18 weeks on the Billboard country songs chart and reached the number one spot in late 1982, becoming Fricke's first number one single. In Canada, "Do Me with Love" topped the RPM country chart while "Don't Worry 'bout Me Baby" reached the top ten.

== Track listings ==
=== Original versions ===
Side one (LP and cassette versions)
No.	Title	Writer(s)	Length
1.	"Do Me with Love"	John Schweers	2:49
2.	"Homeword Bound"	Paul Simon	2:56
3.	"Love Me"	Barry Gibb; Robin Gibb	2:35
4.	"Don't Worry 'bout Me Baby"	Deborah Allen; Bruce Channel; Kieran Kane	2:27
5.	"Sleeping with Your Memory"	Nancy Montgomery; Quentin Powers	3:54

Side two (LP and cassette versions)
No.	Title	Writer(s)	Length
1.	"The Heart"	Larry Gatlin	3:02
2.	"Always"	Randy Jackson	2:20
3.	"If You Could See Me Now"	Charles Chavez	2:28
4.	"There Ain't No Future in the Past"	Rains	2:59
5.	"Midnight Words"	Tom Campbell; Glen King	3:54

=== Digital version ===
Music download and streaming versions
No.	Title	Writer(s)	Length
1.	"Do Me with Love"	Schweers	2:52
2.	"Homeword Bound"	Simon	2:59
3.	"Love Me"	Gibb; Gibb	2:37
4.	"Don't Worry 'bout Me Baby"	Allen; Channel; Kane	2:29
5.	"Sleeping with Your Memory"	Montgomery; Powers	3:54
6.	"The Heart"	Gatlin	3:05
7.	"Always"	Jackson	2:21
8.	"If You Could See Me Now"	E. Chavez	2:29
9.	"There Ain't No Future in the Past"	Rains	3:00
10.	"Midnight Words"	Campbell; King	3:53

== Personnel ==
All credits are adapted from the liner notes of Sleeping with Your Memory.

Musical personnel

- Eddie Bayers – drums
- Tom Brannon – backing vocals
- Dennis Burnside – piano
- Phil Forrest – backing vocals
- Janie Fricke – lead vocals, backing vocals
- Sonny Garrish – steel guitar
- Sheri Huffman – backing vocals
- The Shelly Kurland Strings – strings
- Joe Osborn – bass
- Charlie McCoy – harmonica
- Bobby Ogdin – keyboards
- Ricky Skaggs – backing vocals, banjo, fiddle, mandolin
- Diane Tidwell – backing vocals
- Rafe Van Hoy – guitar
- Paul Worley – guitar

Technical personnel

- Dennis Burnside – keyboard arrangements
- Jim Ed Norman – producer
- Bergen White – arrangements, conductor

== Charts ==
Weekly chart performance for Sleeping with Your Memory
Chart (1981–1982)	Peak position
US Top Country Albums (Billboard)	42

== Release history ==
Region	Date	Format	Label	Ref.
Australia	September 1981	Vinyl	CBS Records International	
North America	September 1981	Vinyl	Columbia Records	
North America	September 1981	Cassette	Columbia Records	
United Kingdom	September 1981	Vinyl	CBS Records International	
North America	2016	Music download; streaming	Columbia Records	
