= Pride (Ray Price song) =

Single by Ray Price
- Released: January 7, 1962
- Genre: Country
- Length: 2:35
- Label: Columbia
- Songwriters: Wayne Walker, Irene Stanton
- Producers: Don Law; Frank Jones

Ray Price singles chronology
""I've Just Destroyed the World (I'm Living in)"" (1962)	"Pride" (1962)	""Walk Me to the Door"" (1962)

"Pride" is a song written by Wayne Walker and Irene Stanton. It was first recorded by American country music artist Ray Price, whose version became a major hit. Price's version was released on January 7, 1962, where it peaked at No. 5 on Billboard's Hot Country charts.

== Charts ==
Chart (1962)	Peak position
US Hot Country Songs (Billboard)	5

== Jeannie Seely version ==
"Pride"

Single by Jeannie Seely

from the album Can I Sleep in Your Arms/Lucky Ladies
- Released: May 8, 1972
- Genre: Country
- Label: MCA Records
- Songwriters: Wayne Walker, Irene Stanton
- Producer: Walter Haynes

Jeannie Seely singles chronology
""Alright I'll Sign the Papers"" (1971)	"Pride" (1972)	""Farm in Pennsyltucky"" (1972)

Jeannie Seely recorded the song and released it as a single in May 1972. It peaked at number 47 on the Billboard Hot Country Songs chart. The song was later included on her 1973 album, Can I Sleep in Your Arms/Lucky Ladies.

=== Charts ===
Chart (1973)	Peak position
US Hot Country Songs (Billboard)	47

== Janie Fricke version ==
"Pride"

Single by Janie Fricke

from the album I'll Need Someone to Hold Me When I Cry
- B-side: "Going Through the Motions"
- Released: February 1981
- Genre: Country
- Label: Columbia
- Songwriters: Wayne Walker, Irene Stanton
- Producer: Jim Ed Norman

Janie Fricke singles chronology
"Down to My Last Broken Heart" (1980)	"Pride" (1981)	"I'll Need Someone to Hold Me (When I Cry)" (1981)

"Pride" was then recorded by American country music artist Janie Fricke. It was released in February 1981 as the second single from her album I'll Need Someone to Hold Me When I Cry. The song reached #12 on the Billboard Hot Country Singles chart and #1 on the RPM Country Tracks chart in Canada.

=== Charts ===
Chart (1981)	Peak position
US Hot Country Songs (Billboard)	12
Canadian RPM Country Tracks	1

== Cover versions by other artists ==
- Anita Bryant (1963)
- Gerrie Lynn (1966)
- Dean Martin (August 1967)
- Tommy Hooker (2012)
- Justin Trevino (May 9, 2017)
- Doug Jernigan (instrumental) (1978)
- Mike Headrick (instrumental) (2014)
