= Crossroads: Hymns of Faith =

Studio album by Janie Fricke
- Released: August 15, 1992
- Studio: Chelsea Studio
- Genre: Gospel
- Label: Branson
- Producer: Janie Fricke; Ed Keeley

Janie Fricke chronology
Janie Fricke (1991)	Crossroads: Hymns of Faith (1992)	Now & Then (1993)

Crossroads: Hymns of Faith is a studio album by American country artist Janie Fricke. It was released on August 15, 1992, via Branson Entertainment and featured 12 tracks. It was the seventeenth studio album released in Fricke's career and her first album of gospel music. Its tracks were covers of gospel material originally recorded by other artists.

== Background and recording ==
After over a decade at Columbia Records and eight number one country hits, Janie Fricke moved to Intersound Records in the early 1990s. Her first release for the label was a 1991 eponymous album. Following its release, Fricke moved to the label's subsidiary company Branson Entertainment. The label was designed specifically for country artists who were performing in Branson, Missouri, an American city where veteran artists could perform concerts to fans.

Fricke was a frequent performer of Branson, Missouri and often included gospel selections in her concert set. Fans of her Branson performances encouraged Fricke to record an album of gospel material which prompted the creation of Crossroads: Hymns of Faith. The album was recorded at the Chelsea Studio, located in Nashville, Tennessee. The album was the first in Fricke's career to be self-produced. It also featured Ed Keeley as an executive producer on the project.

== Content, release and reception ==
Professional ratings
Review scores
Source	Rating
Allmusic	2/5 stars

Crossroads: Hymns of Faith contained a total of 12 tracks. A majority of the disc was traditional gospel songs such as "Amazing Grace", "The Old Rugged Cross" and "Swing Low, Sweet Chariot". Additionally, Fricke also covers Kris Kristofferson's "Why Me Lord" and Eric Clapton's "Tears in Heaven". Crossroads was originally released on August 15, 1992, on Branson Entertainment. It was Fricke's seventeenth studio collection. It was distributed by Branson as both a compact disc and cassette. Years later, the album was reissued to digital platforms including Apple Music. The album was given two out of five stars from AllMusic.

== Track listings ==
=== Compact disc and digital versions ===
Crossroads: Hymns of Faith
No.	Title	Writer(s)	Length
1.	"Ten Thousand Angels"	Roy Overholt	3:50
2.	"The Old Rugged Cross"	Traditional	3:09
3.	"Take My Hand, Precious Lord"	Thomas A. Dorsey	2:45
4.	"Tears in Heaven"	Eric Clapton; Will Jennings	4:29
5.	"People Get Ready"	Curtis Mayfield	3:00
6.	"I Believe"	Ervin Drake; Irvin Graham; Jimmy Shirl; Al Stillman	2:56
7.	"Why Me Lord"	Kris Kristofferson	3:05
8.	"Sweet Little Jesus Boy"	Robert MacGimsey	3:31
9.	"Elijah Rock"	Traditional	3:03
10.	"Swing Low Sweet Chariot"	Traditional	2:32
11.	"Were You There"	Traditional	3:54
12.	"Amazing Grace"	Traditional	4:52

=== Cassette version ===
Side one
No.	Title	Writer(s)	Length
1.	"Ten Thousand Angels"	Overholt	3:47
2.	"The Old Rugged Cross"	Traditional	3:06
3.	"Take My Hand, Precious Lord"	Dorsey	2:42
4.	"Tears in Heaven"	Clapton; Jennings	4:27
5.	"People Get Ready"	Mayfield	2:57
6.	"I Believe"	Drake; Graham; Shirl; Stillman	2:53

Side two
No.	Title	Writer(s)	Length
1.	"Why Me Lord"	Kristofferson	2:57
2.	"Sweet Little Jesus Boy"	MacGimsey	3:28
3.	"Elijah Rock"	Traditional	3:00
4.	"Swing Low Sweet Chariot"	Traditional	2:29
5.	"Were You There"	Traditional	3:50
6.	"Amazing Grace"	Traditional	4:48

== Personnel ==
All credits are adapted from the liner notes of Crossroads: Hymns of Faith and AllMusic.

Musical personnel

- Janie Fricke - lead vocals
- Lea Jane Berinati – backing vocals
- Doug Clements – backing vocals
- Sonny Garrish – steel guitar
- Vicki Hampton – backing vocals
- Jerry Kroon – drums
- Gary Lunn – bass
- Charlie McCoy – harmonica
- Tony Migliore – keyboards
- Cindy Walker Richardson – backing vocals
- Mike Severs – acoustic guitar, electric guitar
- Dennis Wilson – backing vocals
- Curtis Young – backing vocals

Technical personnel

- Laurie Anderson – package design
- Neil Einstman – assistant engineer
- Janie Fricke – producer, A&R direction
- Chuck Haines – engineer, mixing
- Dave Hieronymus – engineer, mixing
- Ed Keeley – executive producer, A&R direction, mixing
- Tony Migliore – associate producer
- Gary Rice – digital mastering

== Release history ==
Region	Date	Format	Label	Ref.
North America	August 15, 1992	Compact disc; cassette	Branson Entertainment	
North America	2016	Music download; streaming	IndieBlu Music	
