= Bouncin' Back =

Studio album by Janie Fricke
- Released: October 10, 2000
- Studio: The Tracking Station
- Genre: Country
- Label: JMF
- Producer: Janie Fricke

Janie Fricke chronology
Now & Then (1993)	Bouncin' Back (2000)	Live at Billy Bob's Texas (2002)

Bouncin' Back is a studio album by American country artist Janie Fricke. It was released on October 10, 2000, via JMF Records and contained 12 tracks. It was the nineteenth studio collection of Fricke's career and the first released on her own record label (JMF). The project was also Fricke's first album of new material since 1993.

== Background, content and release ==
Professional ratings
Review scores
Source	Rating
Allmusic	3/5 stars

Janie Fricke has been considered among journalists as one of country music's most successful female artists during the 1980s. She had a series of number one and top ten country songs during the decade. In the 1990s, she left her long-time label and recorded for the smaller Intersound Records. Her last record for the company was 1993's Now & Then. In 2000, Fricke launched her own record company titled JMF Records where she would release Bouncin' Back.

The album was recorded at The Tracking Station, a studio located in Nashville, Tennessee. The sessions for the project were solely produced by Fricke. It was her third album to be self-produced. In the album's liner notes, Fricke dedicated the project to her fans: "Thank you to all my special fans and friends who have my made my music a reality. This project is dedicated to each and every one of you!"

Bouncin' Back consisted of 12 tracks. All of the disc's material were new recordings including a self-penned track by Fricke herself called "Love Forever More". Bouncin' Back was released on October 10, 2000, through JMF Records. It was Fricke's first release for her own record label and the nineteenth studio album in her career overall. It was originally distributed as both a compact disc and a cassette. AllMusic later reviewed the project and gave it three out of five stars.

== Track listings ==
=== Compact disc version ===
Bouncin' Back
No.	Title	Length
1.	"If You Keep Building Fences"	3:45
2.	"Quilt of Dreams"	3:07
3.	"Bouncin' Back"	3:06
4.	"Our Love's Worth Fighting For"	4:03
5.	"In Here"	3:18
6.	"Pick a Lane"	3:03
7.	"It's Not Me"	4:28
8.	"Tender Too Much"	2:53
9.	"No Turning Back"	3:49
10.	"Any Other Stone"	3:03
11.	"Love Forever More"	3:54
12.	"See-Saw Ride"	3:29

=== Cassette version ===
Side one
No.	Title	Length
1.	"If You Keep Building Fences"	3:45
2.	"Quilt of Dreams"	3:07
3.	"Bouncin' Back"	3:06
4.	"Our Love's Worth Fighting For"	4:03
5.	"In Here"	3:18
6.	"Pick a Lane"	3:03

Side two
No.	Title	Length
1.	"It's Not Me"	4:28
2.	"Tender Too Much"	2:53
3.	"No Turning Back"	3:49
4.	"Any Other Stone"	3:03
5.	"Love Forever More"	3:54
6.	"See-Saw Ride"	3:29

== Personnel ==
All credits are adapted from the liner notes of Bouncin' Back and AllMusic.

Musical personnel

- Danny Bailey – Background vocals
- Brian Barnett – Musician
- Mark Basden – Musician
- Lea Jane Berinati – Background vocals
- Glenn Duncan – Musician
- Janie Fricke – Lead vocals
- Kerry Marx – Musician
- Russ Pahl – Musician
- Mark Prentice – Musician
- Judy Rodman – Background vocals
- Steven Sheehan – Musician
- Catherine Styron – Musician
- Dennis Wilson – Background vocals

Technical personnel

- Danny Bailey – Engineer
- Melanie Briley – Clothing
- Hector Cantu – Assistant
- Dan Carter – Photography
- Janie Fricke – Producer
- Roger Triche – Make-up

== Release history ==
Region	Date	Format	Label	Ref.
North America	October 10, 2000	Compact disc; cassette	JMF Records	
