= Janie Fricke (album) =

Studio album by Janie Fricke
- Released: 1991
- Studio: House of David
- Genre: Country; country pop
- Label: Intersound
- Producer: Randy Jackson; Gilles Goddard

Janie Fricke chronology
Labor of Love (1989)	Janie Fricke (1991)	Crossroads: Hymns of Faith (1992)

Singles from Janie Fricke
- 1. "You Never Crossed My Mind" Released: 1991; 2. "I Want to Grow Old with You" Released: 1991

Janie Fricke is a self-titled studio album by American country artist Janie Fricke. It was released in 1991 on Intersound Records and contained 11 tracks. The eponymous disc was the sixteenth studio recording of Fricke's career and her first with the Intersound label. The album included two singles that were spawned in 1991. The second single "I Want to Grow Old with You" reached the Canadian country chart in 1991.

== Background and content ==
In 1989, Fricke's final album with Columbia Records was released titled Labor of Love. With limited commercial attention to her music, the label dropped her in 1990 and Fricke signed with the smaller Intersound Records in 1991. Her first album project with the label would be an eponymous disc in 1991. It was recorded at the House of David, a studio located in Nashville, Tennessee. The sessions for the album were produced by Gilles Godard and Randy Jackson (Fricke's husband at the time). A total of 11 tracks comprised the album. Three of the album's songs were composed by Gilles Godard: "Greater Than Love", "I Want to Grow Old with You" and "I Know a Good Love (When I Lose One)". It also included a cover version of "Love Letters" which was originally a top ten pop hit for Ketty Lester in 1962.

== Release and singles ==
Janie Fricke was first released in 1991 on Intersound Records. It was Fricke's first release with the label and her sixteenth album issued in her career. The album was distributed as a compact disc. The album was not reissued digitally. However, five tracks from the original recording later appeared on 2019's The Best of Janie Fricke. The album was sold to digital markets through 2019 Entertainment One. The remaining five tracks from the original 1991 release were included on The Best of Janie Fricke, Vol. 2, which was released through the same platforms. The album spawned two singles. Its first song to be issued as a single was "You Never Crossed My Mind". The track was released as a CD single was promoted to Canadian country markets in 1991. "I Want to Grow Old with You" was also released as a single from the project in 1991. It reached Canada's RPM Country Songs chart in 1991 and peaked at number 74. It was Fricke's last single to reach a RPM position.

== Track listing ==
Janie Fricke (CD version)
No.	Title	Writer(s)	Length
1.	"You Never Crossed My Mind"	Candy Johnson; J. Martin Johnson	3:19
2.	"Independence Day"	Tim Nichols; Jimmy Stewart	3:02
3.	"What Do I Do (With All This Love)"	Bib Kitchener; Jennifer Pierce	3:24
4.	"Humbling Love"	Matraca Berg; Curtis Stone	3:40
5.	"Greater Than Love"	Rick Giles; Giles Goddard	3:44
6.	"Love Letters"	Edward Heyman; Victor Young	3:06
7.	"I Want to Grow Old with You"	Lee Bach; Goddard; Billy Troy	3:25
8.	"I Know a Good Love (When I Lose One)"	Giles; Goddard	3:17
9.	"Old Feeling 'Bout a New Love"	Cary Chater; Cyril Rawson	3:30
10.	"I'd Like to Know How You Got the Know-How"	Billy Aerts; Linda Young	2:47
11.	"Finishing Touch"	Ron Harbin; Kim Williams; Benny Wilson	3:06

== Personnel ==
All credits are adapted from the liner notes of Janie Fricke.

Musical personnel

- Janie Fricke - lead and backing vocals
- David Briggs – keyboards, piano
- Mark Casstevens – acoustic guitar, harmonica, mandolin
- Sonny Garrish – steel guitar
- Jana King – backing vocals
- Jerry Kroon – drums
- Larry Paxton – bass
- Brent Rowan – lead guitar
- Williams Warren – backing vocals
- Tony Wiggins – backing vocals
- John Willis – acoustic guitar, dobro, lead guitar, mandolin (plectrum tunning)
- Dennis Wilson – backing vocals

Technical personnel

- Laurie Anderson – package design
- David Briggs – session leader
- Jeff Carlton – studio relations
- Michael Corbett – assistant engineer
- Gilles Goddard – executive producer, producer
- Tom Hitchcock – engineer
- Randy Jackson – executive producer
- Montage Studios – photography
- Michael Olsen – package design

== Release history ==
Region	Date	Format	Label	Ref.
North America	1991	Compact disc	Intersound Records	
