= If the Fall Don't Get You =

Single by Janie Fricke

from the album Love Lies
- B-side: "Where's the Fire"
- Released: May 12, 1984
- Genre: Country
- Length: 2:47
- Label: Columbia
- Songwriter(s): Van Stephenson, Dave Robbins, Sam Lorber
- Producer(s): Bob Montgomery

Janie Fricke singles chronology
"Let's Stop Talkin' About It" (1984)	"If the Fall Don't Get You" (1984)	"Your Heart's Not in It" (1984)

"If the Fall Don't Get You" is a song written by Van Stephenson, Dave Robbins and Sam Lorber, and recorded by American country music artist Janie Fricke. It was released in May 1984 as the third single from the album Love Lies. The song reached #8 on the Billboard Hot Country Singles & Tracks chart, breaking a string of eight consecutive top 5 country hits for Fricke, the last three of which had all hit #1 on Billboard's country charts.

== Chart performance ==
Chart (1984)	Peak position
US Hot Country Songs (Billboard)	8
Canadian RPM Country Tracks	6
