= Love Lies (Janie Fricke album) =

Studio album by Janie Fricke
- Released: October 1983
- Recorded: July 1983
- Studio: Soundshop Studio
- Genre: Country-pop
- Label: Columbia
- Producer: Bob Montgomery

Janie Fricke chronology
| Greatest Hits (1983) | Love Lies (1983) | The First Word in Memory (1984) |

Singles from Love Lies
- 1. "Tell Me a Lie" Released: September 1983; 2. "Let's Stop Talkin' About It" Released: January 1984; 3. "If the Fall Don't Get You" Released: April 1984

Love Lies is a studio album by American country music artist Janie Fricke. It was released in October 1983 via Columbia Records and contained ten tracks. The project was the eighth studio album of Fricke's music career and the second highest-charting album of her career. Three singles were spawned from the project: "Tell Me a Lie", "Let's Stop Talkin' About It" and "If the Fall Don't Get You". The first two singles from the disc reached number one on the North American country charts.

== Background and content ==
Signed to Columbia Records in 1977, Janie Fricke had her breakthrough in 1981 when she began recording ballads. In 1982, she transitioned into a country-pop uptempo style with the album It Ain't Easy Her follow-up record called Love Lies would be crafted in a similar fashion to her 1982 LP. For the project, Fricke collaborated for the second time with producer Bob Montgomery. The album was recorded in July 1983 at the Soundshop Studio, located in Franklin, Tennessee.

Love Lies was a collection of ten tracks. Included was a cover of Sami Jo's "Tell Me a Lie", which also appeared on It Ain't Easy. The title track was originally recorded by Cristy Lane for her 1978 album of the same name. The remainder of the record was a collection of up-tempo tracks ("If the Fall Don't Get You" and "Where's the Fire") and ballads ("Lonely People" and "How Do You Fall Out of Love").

== Release, reception and singles ==
Professional ratings
Review scores
| Source | Rating |
|---|---|
| Allmusic | 3/5 stars |

Love Lies was first released in October 1983 on Columbia Records. The disc was Fricke's eighth studio album. It was originally distributed as a vinyl LP and a cassette. It later decades, it was reissued to digital platforms including Apple Music. Love Lies was Fricke's fourth album to make the American Billboard country albums chart. It spent 52 weeks on the chart before peaking at number ten in April 1984. It was her second highest-charting album in her career, only second to 1986's Black and White. In later years, Love Lies received three out of five stars from AllMusic.

Love Lies spawned three singles between 1983 and 1984. Although originally released on Fricke's It Ain't Easy LP, "Tell Me a Lie" was officially released as a single in September 1983 in order to promote Love Lies. The single spent one week at the number one spot on Billboard Hot Country Songs chart in December 1983. In January 1984, "Let's Stop Talkin' About It" was released as the disc's second single. It also spent one week at the top of country songs chart, reaching the position in March 1984. In April 1984, "If the Fall Don't Get You" was spawned as the album's final single release. Later that summer, the song reached number eight on the Billboard country list. Additionally, both "Tell Me a Lie" and "Let's Stop Talkin' About It" would reach the number one spot on Canada's RPM country chart. "If the Fall Don't Get You" would climb to number six as well.

== Track listings ==
=== Original versions ===
Side one (LP and cassette versions)
| No. | Title | Writer(s) | Length |
|---|---|---|---|
| 1. | "If the Fall Don't Get You" | Sam Lorber; Dave Robbins; Van Stephenson | 2:47 |
| 2. | "Have I Got a Heart" | Marvin Morrow; Keith Stegall | 2:40 |
| 3. | "How Do You Fall Out of Love" | Jeff Harrington; Jeff Pennig | 3:23 |
| 4. | "Love Lies" | Tommy Rocco; Charlie Black | 2:53 |
| 5. | "Tell Me a Lie" | Mickey Buckins; Barbara Wyrick | 3:35 |

Side two (LP and cassette versions)
| No. | Title | Writer(s) | Length |
|---|---|---|---|
| 1. | "Let's Stop Talkin' About It" | Deborah Allen; Rory Bourke; Rafe Van Hoy | 3:15 |
| 2. | "Lonely People" | Mike Reid; Troy Seals; Eddie Setser | 2:57 |
| 3. | "Walkin' a Broken Heart" | Dennis Linde; Alan Rush | 3:07 |
| 4. | "I've Had All the Love I Can Stand" | Jan Buckingham; Shawna Harrington-Burkhart | 3:51 |
| 5. | "Where's the Fire" | Lorber; Susan Longacre | 2:27 |

=== Digital version ===
Music download and streaming
| No. | Title | Writer(s) | Length |
|---|---|---|---|
| 1. | "If the Fall Don't Get You" | Lorber; Robbins; Stephenson | 2:50 |
| 2. | "Have I Got a Heart" | Morrow; Stegall | 2:41 |
| 3. | "How Do You Fall Out of Love" | Harrington; Pennig | 3:25 |
| 4. | "Love Lies" | Rocco; Black | 2:56 |
| 5. | "Tell Me a Lie" | Buckins; Wyrick | 4:01 |
| 6. | "Let's Stop Talkin' About It" | Allen; Bourke; Van Hoy | 3:17 |
| 7. | "Lonely People" | Reid; Seals; Setser | 3:00 |
| 8. | "Walkin' a Broken Heart" | Linde; Rush | 3:10 |
| 9. | "I've Had All the Love I Can Stand" | Buckingham; Harrington | 3:53 |
| 10. | "Where's the Fire" | Lorber; Longacre | 2:30 |

== Personnel ==
All credits are adapted from the liner notes of Love Lies.

Musical personnel

- Janie Fricke – lead and backing vocals
- Dan Huff – guitar
- Kenny Mims – electric guitar
- The Nashville String Machine – strings
- Ron Oates – keyboards
- James Stroud – drums
- William C. Warren – backing vocals
- Tony Wiggins – backing vocals
- Benny Wilson – backing vocals
- Bob Wray – bass

Technical personnel

- Bob Montgomery – producer

== Charts ==
Weekly chart performance for Love Lies
| Chart (1983–1984) | Peak position |
|---|---|
| US Top Country Albums (Billboard) | 10 |

== Release history ==
| Region | Date | Format | Label | Ref. |
|---|---|---|---|---|
| North America | October 1983 | Vinyl | Columbia Records | |
| North America | October 1983 | Cassette | Columbia Records | |
| United Kingdom | October 1983 | Vinyl | CBS Records International | |
| North America | 2016 | Music download; streaming | Columbia Records | |
