= Let's Stop Talkin' About It =

Single by Janie Fricke

from the album Love Lies
- B-side: "I've Had All the Love"
- Released: January 1984
- Genre: Country
- Length: 3:18
- Label: Columbia
- Songwriter(s): Deborah Allen; Rafe Van Hoy; Rory Bourke
- Producer(s): Bob Montgomery

Janie Fricke singles chronology
| "Tell Me a Lie" (1983) | "Let's Stop Talkin' About It" (1984) | "If the Fall Don't Get You" (1984) |

"Let's Stop Talkin' About It" is a song written by Deborah Allen, Rafe Van Hoy and Rory Bourke, and originally recorded by Allen in 1982. In January 1984, American country music artist Janie Fricke released the song as the second single from her album Love Lies. The song was Fricke's fifth number one country hit as a solo artist. The single went to number one for one week and spent a total of twelve weeks in the country top 40.

== Charts ==
=== Weekly charts ===
| Chart (1984) | Peak position |
|---|---|
| US Hot Country Songs (Billboard) | 1 |
| Canadian RPM Country Tracks | 1 |

=== Year-end charts ===
| Chart (1984) | Position |
|---|---|
| US Hot Country Songs (Billboard) | 43 |
