= Barbara Wyrick =

- Born: 1950 (age 75–76); Dyersburg, Tennessee, United States
- Occupations: Songwriter, singer
- Years active: 1960s - ?
- Labels: Calliope, Melodyland

Barbara Wyrick is an American singer and songwriter. She has written songs that became hits for James Brown, Candi Staton, Mac Davis, Janie Fricke, and others.

== Background ==
The youngest of five children, Barbara Wyrick was born in Dyersburg, Tennessee on July 21, 1950. She learnt how to play piano at a young age. She wrote the song "This Question" at age ten. At age twelve she entered into a competition and was introduced to Rick Hall. This also led to her being signed on to his production and publishing company. Also around that time she recorded her composition "Little Sailor-Boy" which was released on a record.

She had success with an early composition "Lovin' You, Lovin' Me", which became a hit for Candi Staton.

She was named as one of the top five United States country writers in 1984.

== Career ==
=== 1960s to 1970s ===
Following her graduation from high school in 1968, she attended Memphis State University and signed on as a staff writer with Fame Publishing. In 1972 she moved to Muscle Shoals.

Together with Mickey Buckins she wrote "Tell Me A Lie". Singer Sami Jo recorded the song in 1973 which was produced by Sonny Limbo. It became a hit and made it to no. 21 on the pop charts and no. 14 on the Easy Listening Charts.

With Terry Woodford and Clayton Ivey, Wyrick composed "Give Out, But Don't Give Up" for The Supremes, the b-side of their single "He's My Man", later released on their 1975 self-titled album.

According to the August 27, 1977 issue of Cash Box, her debut album was due to come out in late Summer. Her single "Left Over Love" was released on Calliope 8005. One of the Picks of the week by Cash Box, it was reviewed in the September 10, 1977 issue. The review was positive with the reviewer saying "the delicate quality of her voice is the strong point" and that it was for country and easy listening stations.

She was a background vocalist on David Meece's 1978 Christian-themed album, Everybody Needs a Little Help.

She wrote the song "One Man's Woman" with Tom Brassfield which was recorded by Kelly Warren and released in 1978 on RCA. It was reviewed in the December 9 issue of Cash Box with the reviewer saying that the vocals and string arrangements were very good.

By the late 1970s, she was on the board of directors of the Muscle Shoals Music Association.

It was reported by Cash Box in the October 20, 1979 issue that Wyrick had signed an exclusive publishing agreement with Intersong Music (ASCAP).

=== 1980s to present ===
James Brown recorded Wyrick's song "Regrets". Backed with "Stone Cold Drag", it was released on Polydor 2054 in 1980. It was reviewed by Cash Box in the magazine's January 19, 1980 issue. The reviewer referred to it as an easy ballad and said that it was nicely arranged. It was already noted by Cash Box in that issue as a programmer, by Jerry Rushien of WEDR in Miami. The single debuted at no. 92 on the Cash Box Top 100 on the week of February 23.

"Tell Me a Lie" would be a hit again in 1983. This time the song was recorded by Janie Fricke. It spent a week at no. 1 on the Radio & Records chart (December 2, 1983). It also did well on Billboard, spending a week at no. 1. (December 10, 1983).

According to the October 13, 1984 issue of Cash Box, she was a backing singer for Ronnie Milsap and on tour with him. She was also named as the number 4 award winner in the Cash Box Country Awards, top five composer section.

She wrote the song "Sexy Young Girl" with Mac Davis who released it as a single. Davis took the song to no. 46 on the Billboard Country chart in 1986.
