= Labor of Love (Janie Frickie album) =

Studio album by Janie Frickie
- Released: July 1989
- Recorded: February 1989
- Studio: Nightingale Studio
- Genre: Country
- Label: Columbia
- Producer: Chris Waters

Janie Frickie chronology
Saddle the Wind (1988)	Labor of Love (1989)	Janie Fricke (1991)

Singles from Labor of Love
- 1. "Love Is One of Those Words" Released: April 1989; 2. "Give 'em My Number" Released: August 1989

Labor of Love is a studio album by American country artist Janie Frickie. It was released in July 1989 via Columbia Records and included ten tracks. The disc was the fourteenth studio release of Frickie's career. It was also her final album for the Columbia label before she was dropped by the company. Two singles were spawned from Labor of Love that made charting positions on both the American and Canadian country surveys.

== Background and content ==
Janie Frickie had a string of top ten and number one country singles during the mid-1980s that helped consider her as one of the genre's most successful female artists of the decade. By the end of 1980s, Frickie's singles had reached progressively lower chart positions and she was eventually dropped by her long time label Columbia Records. Before the end of her contract, Frickie recorded one last album titled Labor of Love. The project was recorded in February 1989 at the Nightingale Studio, located in Nashville, Tennessee. It was produced by Chris Waters and was her first project to be produced by him.

Labor of Love contained ten tracks and was mostly a collection of ballads. Its opening track "Love Is One of Those Words" was co-written by Waters, along with country performer Holly Dunn. Also featured was Frickie's self-composed "Last Thing I Didn't Do", which she co-wrote with husband Randy Jackson. "My Old Friend the Blues" was written and originally recorded by Steve Earle for his album Guitar Town. The album also included "One of Those Things", which would later be recorded and become a top ten country single for its writer Pam Tillis.

== Release, reception and singles ==
Professional ratings
Review scores
Source	Rating
AllMusic	2.5/5 stars

Labor of Love was originally released in July 1989 on Columbia Records. It was the fourteenth studio disc of Frickie's career. The album was originally issued as a vinyl LP, cassette and compact disc. Years later, it was reissued to digital platforms including Apple Music. The album spent 13 weeks on America's Billboard country albums chart in 1989, peaking at number 64. To date, it is Frickie's last album to reach a Billboard chart position. Due to constant mispronunciations of her last name, Columbia changed the spelling from "Fricke" to "Frickie" beginning in 1986.

Labor of Love spawned two singles. Its first single was "Love Is One of Those Words", which was released by Columbia in April 1989. It spent seven weeks on the Billboard Hot Country Songs chart and peaked at number 56 in June 1989. The record's second single was "Give 'em My Number", which was distributed by Columbia in August 1989. The single spent nine weeks on the Billboard country and reached number 43 in October 1989. "Give 'em My Number" is Frickie's last Billboard charting single to date. They also made the Canadian RPM country songs chart, both reaching positions outside the top 40 as well.

== Track listings ==
=== Vinyl and cassette versions ===
Side one (LP and cassette versions)
No.	Title	Writer(s)	Length
1.	"Love Is One of Those Words"	Holly Dunn; Tom Shapiro; Chris Waters	3:05
2.	"Give 'em My Number"	Dave Loggins	3:26
3.	"What Are You Doing Here with Me"	Bill Rice; Sharon Rice	2:46
4.	"The Last Thing That I Didn't Do"	Janie Frickie; Randy Jackson	2:40
5.	"Walking on the Moon"	Katy Moffatt; Tom Russell	3:37

Side two (LP and cassette versions)
No.	Title	Writer(s)	Length
1.	"Feeling Is Believing"	Gary Nicholson; Pam Tillis; Kevin Welch	3:34
2.	"I Can't Help the Way I Don't Feel"	Michael Garvin; Shapiro; Waters	2:47
3.	"No Ordinary Memory"	Larry Shell; Jeff Tweel	2:48
4.	"One of Those Things"	Paul Overstreet; Tillis	3:16
5.	"My Old Friend the Blues"	Steve Earle	3:07

=== Compact disc and digital versions ===
Labor of Love
No.	Title	Writer(s)	Length
1.	"Love Is One of Those Words"	Dunn; Shapiro; Waters	3:08
2.	"Give 'em My Number"	Loggins	3:28
3.	"What Are You Doing Here with Me"	Rice; Rice	2:48
4.	"The Last Thing That I Didn't Do"	Frickie; Jackson	2:42
5.	"Walking on the Moon"	Moffatt; Russell	3:37
6.	"Feeling Is Believing"	Nicholson; Tillis; Welch	3:36
7.	"I Can't Help the Way I Don't Feel"	Garvin; Shapiro; Waters	2:48
8.	"No Ordinary Memory"	Shell; Tweel	2:49
9.	"One of Those Things"	Overstreet; Tillis	3:17
10.	"My Old Friend the Blues"	Earle	3:08

== Personnel ==
All credits are adapted from the liner notes of Labor of Love.

Musical personnel

- Janie Frickie - lead and backing vocals
- Mark Casstevens – acoustic guitar
- Steve Earle – acoustic guitar
- Paul Franklin – Dobro, steel guitar
- Billy Hullett – acoustic guitar
- Roy Huskey, Jr. – electric upright bass
- John Jarvis – piano
- Chris Leuzinger – acoustic guitar, electric guitar
- Larrie Londin – drums
- Phil Naish – keyboards, piano
- Al Perkins – steel guitar
- Judy Rodman – backing vocals
- Tom Robb – electric bass
- Gary Smith – piano
- Pam Tillis – backing vocals
- Tony Wiggins – backing vocals
- Dennis Wilson – backing vocals
- Lonnie Wilson – drums
- Chris Waters – backing vocals
- Glenn Worf – electric bass
- Curtis Young – backing vocals

Technical personnel

- Lee Groitzsch – additional engineering
- Bill Johnson – art direction
- Shawn McLean – assistant engineer
- McGuire – photography
- Gary Paczosa – assistant engineer
- Michael Psanos – engineer, remix engineer
- Carry Summers – assistant engineer
- Chris Waters – arranger, producer
- Hank Williams – mastering engineer

== Charts ==
Chart (1989)	Peak position
US Top Country Albums (Billboard)	64

== Release history ==
Region	Date	Format	Label	Ref.
North America	July 1989	Vinyl	Columbia Records	
North America	July 1989	Cassette	Columbia Records	
North America	July 1989	Compact disc	Columbia Records	
United Kingdom	July 1989	Vinyl	CBS Records International	
North America	2016	Music download; streaming	Columbia Records	
