= Saddle the Wind (album) =

Studio album by Janie Frickie
- Released: July 1988
- Recorded: November 1987 – April 1988
- Studio: Nightingale Studio
- Genre: Country; Texas swing
- Label: Columbia
- Producer: Steve Buckingham

Janie Frickie chronology
Celebration (1987)	Saddle the Wind (1988)	Labor of Love (1989)

Singles from Saddle the Wind
- 1. "Where Does Love Go (When It's Gone)" Released: January 1988; 2. "I'll Walk Before I Crawl" Released: June 1988; 3. "Heart" Released: September 1988

Saddle the Wind is a studio album by American country artist Janie Frickie. It was released in July 1988 via Columbia Records and contained ten tracks. The disc featured several cover versions of classic country songs and some new recordings. It was the thirteenth studio collection released in Frickie's career and spawned three singles: "Where Does Love Go (When It's Gone)", "I'll Walk Before I Crawl" and "Heart". The album received a favorable review from AllMusic following its release.

== Background and content ==
During the mid-1980s, Janie Fricke was considered among country music's most successful artists. She had a string of top ten and number one songs through 1986. Through this period she maintained a recording contract with Columbia Records even as her popularity declined at the end of the 1980s. She would remain with Columbia until 1989. One of her later decade studio albums was 1988's Saddle the Wind. It was Frickie's first project produced by Steve Buckingham. The project was recorded between November 1987 and April 1988 at the Nightingale Studio in Nashville, Tennessee.

According to the liner notes, Saddle the Wind was inspired by several of the album's musicians who helped her create a "Texas swing" musical style. A total of ten tracks comprised the project. Five of the project's songs were new recordings: "The Heart", "I'll Walk Before I Crawl", "Where Does Love Go (When It's Gone)", "Heart" and the title track. The remaining songs were covers of classic country recordings by other artists. This included Bob Wills' "Sugar Moon", Jeannie Seely's "Don't Touch Me", Don Williams's "I'm Not That Good at Goodbye", Willie Nelson's "The Healing Hands of Time" and Patsy Cline's "Crazy Dreams".

== Release, reception and singles ==
Professional ratings
Review scores
Source	Rating
Allmusic	3/5 stars

Saddle the Wind was originally released in July 1988 on Columbia Records. It marked the thirteenth studio release of Frickie's music career. It was originally offered as a vinyl LP, cassette and a compact disc. In later decades, it was reissued to digital markets including Apple Music. Due to constant mispronunciations of her last name, Columbia changed the spelling from "Fricke" to "Frickie" beginning in 1986. Saddle the Wind also included the same spelling. In its initial release, Saddle the Wind spent nine weeks on America's Billboard Top Country Albums chart, peaking at number 64 in September 1988. The disc received three out of five stars from AllMusic following its release.

Saddle the Wind spawned three singles that became minor hits on the North American country charts. "Where Does Love Go (When It's Gone)" was released as its first single in January 1988 via Columbia Records. The song spent eight weeks on the Billboard Hot Country Songs chart climbed to the number 54 position in May 1988. It was followed in June 1988 by "I'll Walk Before I Crawl". The track also spent eight weeks on the country songs chart, peaking at number 50. The final single issued was "Heart" in September 1988. The single spent four weeks on the country songs and peaked at number 64 in October 1988. On Canada's RPM Country Songs survey, only "Where Does Love Go (When It's Gone)" charted, climbing to the number 47 position in 1988.

== Track listing ==
=== Vinyl and cassette versions ===
Side one (LP and cassette versions)
No.	Title	Writer(s)	Length
1.	"Sugar Moon"	Cindy Walker; Bob Wills	2:29
2.	"I'll Walk Before I Crawl"	Linda Buell; Gidget Baird	2:41
3.	"Heart"	Paul Overstreet; Don Schlitz	3:08
4.	"I'm Not That Good at Goodbye"	Bob McDill; Don Williams	3:07
5.	"Don't Touch Me"	Hank Cochran	2:56

Side two (LP and cassette versions)
No.	Title	Writer(s)	Length
1.	"Where Does Love Go (When It's Gone)"	Peter Rowan	2:44
2.	"If I Were Only Her Tonight"	Bucky Jones; Dickey Lee; Bob McDill	2:57
3.	"The Healing Hands of Time"	Willie Nelson	2:40
4.	"Crazy Dreams"	Charles Beam; Charles L. Jiles; W.S. Stevenson	2:29
5.	"Saddle the Wind"	Steve Buckingham; Troy Seals	3:22

=== Compact disc and digital versions ===
Saddle the Wind
No.	Title	Writer(s)	Length
1.	"Sugar Moon"	Walker; Wills	2:29
2.	"I'll Walk Before I Crawl"	Buell; Baird	2:41
3.	"Heart"	Overstreet; Schlitz	3:09
4.	"I'm Not That Good at Goodbye"	McDill; Williams	3:08
5.	"Don't Touch Me"	Cochran	2:57
6.	"Where Does Love Go (When It's Gone)"	Rowan	2:44
7.	"If I Were Only Her Tonight"	Jones; McDill; Lee	2:57
8.	"The Healing Hands of Time"	Nelson	2:40
9.	"Crazy Dreams"	Beam; Jiles; Stevenson	2:30
10.	"Saddle the Wind"	Buckingham; Seals	3:22

== Charts ==
Chart (1988)	Peak position
US Top Country Albums (Billboard)	64

== Release history ==
Region	Date	Format	Label	Ref.
North America	July 1988	Vinyl	Columbia Records	
North America	July 1988	Cassette	Columbia Records	
North America	July 1988	Compact disc	Columbia Records	
United Kingdom	July 1988	Vinyl	CBS Records International	
North America	2016	Music download; streaming	Columbia Records	
