= The First Word in Memory Is Me =

Single by Janie Fricke

from the album The First Word in Memory
- B-side: "One Way Ticket"
- Released: December 1984
- Genre: Country
- Length: 3:33
- Label: Columbia
- Songwriter(s): Pat Bunch, Pam Rose, Mary Ann Kennedy
- Producer(s): Bob Montgomery

Janie Fricke singles chronology
| "A Place to Fall Apart" (1984) | "The First Word in Memory Is Me" (1984) | "She's Single Again" (1985) |

"The First Word in Memory Is Me" is a song written by Pat Bunch, Pam Rose and Mary Ann Kennedy, and recorded by American country music artist Janie Fricke. It was released in December 1984 as the second single from the album The First Word in Memory. The song reached #7 on the Billboard Hot Country Singles & Tracks chart.

== Chart performance ==
| Chart (1984–1985) | Peak position |
|---|---|
| US Hot Country Songs (Billboard) | 7 |
| Canadian RPM Country Tracks | 5 |
