= On My Knees (Charlie Rich song) =

- Spanish release picture sleeve

Single by Charlie Rich with Janie Fricke

from the album Take Me
- B-side: "Mellow Melody"
- Released: September 1978
- Genre: Country
- Length: 3:13
- Label: Epic
- Songwriter(s): Charlie Rich
- Producer(s): Billy Sherrill

Charlie Rich singles chronology
"I Still Believe in Love" (1978)	"On My Knees" (1978)	"I'll Wake You Up When I Get Home" (1979)

Janie Fricke singles chronology
"Please Help Me (I'm Fallin' in Love with You)" (1978)	"On My Knees" (1978)	"Playin' Hard to Get" (1978)

"On My Knees" is a 1978 single by Charlie Rich with Janie Fricke. "On My Knees" was written by Charlie Rich and was his ninth and final number one country hit. The single was also Janie Fricke's first of eight songs to hit number one on the country chart. "On My Knees" stayed at number one for a single week and spent a total of ten weeks on the country chart. The song was originally recorded by Rich as a solo record (Phillips 3052, 1960) and peaked at positions below 100 in the US trades Cashbox and Music Vendor.

== Chart performance ==
Chart (1978)	Peak position
U.S. Billboard Hot Country Singles	1
Canadian RPM Country Tracks	2
New Zealand RIANZ Singles	8
