= I'll Need Someone to Hold Me When I Cry =

Studio album by Janie Fricke
- Released: November 1980
- Recorded: August 1980
- Studio: Audio Media Recorders
- Genre: Country
- Label: Columbia
- Producer: Jim Ed Norman

Janie Fricke chronology
Nice 'n' Easy (1980)	I'll Need Someone to Hold Me When I Cry (1980)	Sleeping with Your Memory (1981)

Singles from I'll Need Someone to Hold Me When I Cry
- 1. "Down to My Last Broken Heart" Released: November 1980; 2. "Pride" Released: February 1981; 3. "I'll Need Someone to Hold Me (When I Cry)" Released: July 1981

I'll Need Someone to Hold Me When I Cry is a studio album by American country music artist Janie Fricke. It was released in November 1980 via Columbia Records and contained ten tracks. The disc was a collection of more traditional country songs, a style that Fricke began adapting to after taking a suggestion from a former record producer. It was the fifth studio album issued in Fricke's career and spawned three singles. Both the title track and "Down to My Last Broken Heart" became top five charting singles in the United States. A cover of the song "Pride" reached the top 20.

== Background and content ==
Janie Fricke had been signed as a recording artist to Columbia Records since 1977 but had yet to have a top ten hit. Former producer Billy Sherrill encouraged her to focus on one particular musical style, so Fricke began recording ballads in the early 1980s. Fricke began recording alongside a new producer Jim Ed Norman who recorded next album in August 1980. The sessions were cut at the Audio Media Recorders studio, located in Nashville, Tennessee. I'll Need Someone to Hold Me When I Cry consisted of ten tracks. Three of the album's new songs were composed by Chick Rains. Along with several new recordings was a cover of Johnnie Ray's "Cry" and Ray Price's "Pride".

== Release, chart performance and reception ==
I'll Need Someone to Hold Me When I Cry was originally released in November 1980 on Columbia Records. It was the fifth studio release in Fricke's recording career. It was originally offered as a vinyl LP and a cassette. Both formats had identical track listings. It was later released to digital and streaming sites including Apple Music. The album was Fricke's first to enter the American Billboard Top Country Albums chart. It spent a total of 21 weeks on the chart and peaked at number 28 by February 1981. The disc later received four out of five stars from AllMusic.

== Singles ==
The disc spawned three singles, starting with "Down to My Last Broken Heart". It spent 18 weeks on the Billboard Hot Country Songs chart and peaked at number two in January 1981. It was Fricke's first solo single to reach the top ten. The second single released from the record was Fricke's cover of "Pride". Columbia released the single in February 1981. Spending 14 weeks on the country songs chart, "Pride" peaked at number 12 in May 1981. The final single released from the album was the title track. It was issued by Columbia in July 1981. After 18 weeks, the song peaked at number four on the Billboard country chart, becoming her second solo top ten single. Additionally, both "Pride" and the title track became Fricke's first singles to reach number one on Canada's RPM Country Songs chart. "Down to My Last Broken Heart" would reach number two.

== Track listings ==
=== Original versions ===
Side one (LP and cassette versions)
No.	Title	Writer(s)	Length
1.	"I'll Need Someone to Hold Me (When I Cry)"	Wayland Holyfield; Bob McDill	2:47
2.	"Enough of Each Other"	Jamie O'Hara	2:39
3.	"Going Through the Motions"	Baker Knight	2:42
4.	"Pride"	Irene Stanton; Wayne P. Walker	2:19
5.	"Down to My Last Broken Heart"	Chick Rains	2:22

Side two (LP and cassette versions)
No.	Title	Writer(s)	Length
1.	"Cry"	Churchill Kohlman	2:57
2.	"Every Time a Tear Drop Falls"	Kerry Chater; Douglas Foxworthy	2:46
3.	"It's Raining Too"	Rains	2:24
4.	"I Just Can't Fool My Heart"	Rains	3:06
5.	"Blue Sky Shining"	Mickey Newbury	2:56

=== Digital version ===
Music download and streaming versions
No.	Title	Writer(s)	Length
1.	"I'll Need Someone to Hold Me (When I Cry)"	Holyfield; McDill	2:50
2.	"Enough of Each Other"	O'Hara	2:41
3.	"Going Through the Motions"	Knight	2:44
4.	"Pride"	Stanton; Walker	2:20
5.	"Down to My Last Broken Heart"	Rains	2:29
6.	"Cry"	Kohlman	2:58
7.	"Every Time a Tear Drop Falls"	Chater; Foxworthy	2:46
8.	"It's Raining Too"	Rains	2:22
9.	"I Just Can't Fool My Heart"	Rains	3:06
10.	"Blue Sky Shining"	Newbury	2:58

== Personnel ==
All credits are adapted from the liner notes of I'll Need Someone to Hold Me When I Cry.

Musical personnel

- Eddie Bayers – drums
- Tom Brannon – backing vocals
- Dennis Burnside – piano
- Mark Casstevens – guitar
- Janie Fricke – lead vocals, backing vocals
- Sonny Garrish – steel guitar
- Lloyd Green – steel guitar
- Sheri Kramer – backing vocals
- Joe Osborn – bass
- Charlie McCoy – harmonica
- Bobby Ogdin – piano
- Ricky Skaggs – backing vocals, fiddle
- Diane Tidwell – backing vocals
- Rafe Van Hoy – guitar
- Paul Worley – guitar

Technical personnel

- Shelly Kurland – concertmaster
- Jim Ed Norman – producer
- Bergen White – arrangements

== Charts ==
Weekly chart performance for I'll Need Someone to Hold Me When I Cry
Chart (1980–1981)	Peak position
US Top Country Albums (Billboard)	28

== Release history ==
Region	Date	Format	Label	Ref.
North America	November 1980	Vinyl	Columbia Records	
North America	November 1980	Cassette	Columbia Records	
United Kingdom	November 1980	Vinyl	CBS Records International	
North America	2016	Music download; streaming	Columbia Records	
