= He's a Heartache (Looking for a Place to Happen) =

Single by Janie Fricke

from the album It Ain't Easy
- B-side: "Tryin' to Fool a Fool"
- Released: May 21, 1983
- Genre: Country
- Length: 2:50
- Label: Columbia
- Songwriter(s): Jeff Silbar, Larry Henley
- Producer(s): Bob Montgomery

Janie Fricke singles chronology
"You Don't Know Love" (1983)	"He's a Heartache (Looking for a Place to Happen)" (1983)	"Tell Me a Lie" (1983)

"He's a Heartache (Looking for a Place to Happen)" is a song written by Jeff Silbar and Larry Henley, and recorded by American country music artist Janie Fricke. It was released in May 1983 as the third single from the album It Ain't Easy. The song was Fricke's third number one on the country chart. Overall in her career, she scored 8 No. 1 hits. The song was introduced to the public in 1983, along with a couple of other hits that went to number 1, like the song "It Ain't Easy Bein' Easy". Soon after it was released, "He's a Heartache" went to the number 1 spot. The song was one of many Countrypolitan songs Fricke recorded and became successful with during her career.

The book Country Music: The Rough Guide quoted Fricke singing "He's a Heartache" as sounding like "an annoyingly peppy aerobics instructor."

== Charts ==
=== Weekly charts ===
Chart (1983)	Peak position
US Hot Country Songs (Billboard)	1
Canadian RPM Country Tracks	1

=== Year-end charts ===
Chart (1983)	Position
US Hot Country Songs (Billboard)	4
