= Your Heart's Not in It =

Single by Janie Fricke

from the album The First Word in Memory
- B-side: "Take It from the Top"
- Released: August 1984
- Genre: Country
- Length: 2:53
- Label: Columbia
- Songwriter(s): Tom Shapiro; Michael Garvin; Bucky Jones
- Producer(s): Bob Montgomery

Janie Fricke singles chronology
"If the Fall Don't Get You" (1984)	"Your Heart's Not in It" (1984)	"A Place to Fall Apart" (1984)

"Your Heart's Not in It" is a song written by Tom Shapiro, Michael Garvin and Bucky Jones, and recorded by American country music artist Janie Fricke. It was released in August 1984 as the first single from the album The First Word in Memory. The song was Fricke's sixth number one on the country chart. The single stayed at number one for a single week and spent a total of thirteen weeks on the country chart.

== Chart performance ==
Chart (1984)	Peak position
US Hot Country Songs (Billboard)	1
Canadian RPM Country Tracks	1
