= Larry Henley =

American musician (1937–2014)

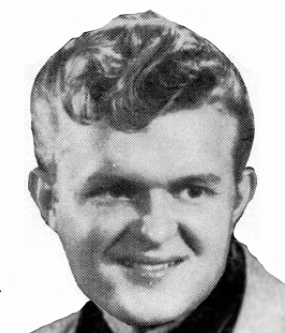
- Henley in 1963

Background information
- Born: Larry Joel Henley; June 30, 1937; Odessa, Texas, US
- Died: December 18, 2014 (aged 77) Nashville, Tennessee, US
- Genres: Pop; rhythm and blues; blue-eyed soul; rock and roll
- Occupation: Singer-songwriter
- Instrument: Vocals
- Years active: 1957–2014
- Formerly of: The Newbeats

Larry Joel Henley (June 30, 1937 – December 18, 2014) was an American singer and songwriter, best known for co-writing (with Jeff Silbar) the 1989 hit record "Wind Beneath My Wings". He is also known for his distinctive falsetto singing voice, which he used prominently when in the Newbeats, a pop trio best known for their hit song "Bread and Butter".

== Early life ==
Henley was born to Carl Henley and Helen Quinn in Odessa, Texas on June 30, 1937. Larry's mother Helen, as well as all her sisters, was a country singer who sang as "Kewpi Timms". She had performed with Cowboy Slim Rinehart on the radio stations XEPN and XEG. His dad worked in an oilfield.

He grew up in Odessa, Texas with three sisters, Barbara Henley, Jeanette Henley Chisholm and Pam Lutrell as well as a younger brother, Reggie Henley. He had originally planned on an acting career before becoming a singer and songwriter. He was a friend of Roy Orbison, who lived 20 miles (32 km) away from Henley, and was one of the inspirations for getting him into music. The only instrument Larry knew how to play was the violin, which he learned as a child and never played after his childhood.

== Career ==
In 1957, Henley was working for Phillips chemical company, Phillips 66, when he moved to Southern California when he was twenty years old with aspirations of being an actor or singer, also attending college at the time. He appeared in "Rent-a-Gent", an Australian film shot in Honolulu. After winning a talent show in San Diego, he got a job as an opening act for The Johnny Otis Show. After a few years of performing in California, lack of money disillusionment led to Henley getting a job in the oil fields near Shreveport, Louisiana and later as a wire line serviceman in New Iberia.

=== The Newbeats ===
While visiting relatives in Shreveport, his brother-in-law told The Dean and Mark Combo, consisting of brothers with the surname Mathis who were the house band for The Diamond Head Lounge, that Henley was once a famous singer and convinced Henley to join the brothers on stage. Henley then started working with the brothers and toured the southern US. Before the band made it big, Henley recorded a few solo records for Hickory Records in Nashville.

Dean and Mark travelled to Nashville to be with Larry and after they were discovered by Mercury Records, they established themselves as the pop group The Newbeats. He was the lead singer for the Newbeats, officially formed in 1964, singing in a distinctive falsetto. Henley's memorable falsetto voice came by accident: "just something I discovered I could do. I’d sing along with Ray Charles and Margie Hendricks records, and I could do the Ray Charles part and then I could do the Margie Hendricks part. Everybody thought that was cute so I’d sing a few Ray Charles songs like that, and people started saying, "You should record like that, that’s a real interesting voice,".

The group had three hits that charted in the top 20 of Billboard magazine, with one of them, "Bread and Butter", reaching No. 2 on the Billboard charts and selling over a million copies. They toured Australia and New Zealand with Roy Orbison, Ray Columbus and the Invaders and the Rolling Stones on the "Big Beat '65" tour. The group's last single was released in 1974.

=== Later career ===
Henley was a friend of Bobby Goldsboro and it was because of Henley's urging that Goldsboro sang the song "Honey".

Henley had a solo album, Piece a Cake, released in 1975.

He co-wrote with Red Lane "'Til I Get It Right" for Tammy Wynette, a 1973 No. 1 hit on the Billboard Hot Country Singles, later covered by Barbra Streisand and Kenny Rogers. Other #1 country hits were his songs "Is It Still Over?" (performed by Randy Travis), "Lizzie and the Rainman" (performed by Tanya Tucker), and "He's a Heartache (Looking for a Place to Happen)" (performed by Janie Fricke). Other songs included "Shotgun Rider" for Delbert McClinton; "You're Welcome to Tonight" by Lynn Anderson and Gary Morris; and "The World Needs a Melody" by The Carter Family with Johnny Cash.

He was a staff songwriter for Tree International Publishing in Nashville.

The song "Wind Beneath My Wings" (written by Henley and Jeff Silbar) was a U.S. #1 hit for Bette Midler and has since totaled around 6 million radio air plays. The song earned Henley and Silbar the Grammy Award for Song of the Year for 1989, and Bette Midler the Record of the Year award. The song was originally recorded by Roger Whittaker in 1982 and has since been covered by numerous artists.

He was a 2012 inductee into the Nashville Songwriters Hall of Fame. "Bread and Butter" has been used in Sunbeam Bread advertisements and multiple films, while "Wind Beneath My Wings" was part of the soundtrack for Beaches (1988). "Love Is on the Air" written by Henley with Jim Hurt and Johnny Slate, performed by Lou Rawls was used in The Cannonball Run.

At the time of his death, he was managed by Charlie Andrews.

== Personal life ==
Henley was married and had a son, born when he was nineteen.

== Death ==
On December 18, 2014, Henley died of Lewy Body Dementia in Nashville, Tennessee at age 77. He had been suffering from Parkinson's and Alzheimer's diseases. He is buried at Kelsey Cemetery in Gilmer, Texas.
