= You Don't Know Love (Janie Fricke song) =

Single by Janie Fricke

from the album It Ain't Easy
- B-side: "Heart to Heart Talk"
- Released: January 17, 1983
- Genre: Country
- Length: 3:16
- Label: Columbia
- Songwriter(s): Don King, Beckie Foster
- Producer(s): Bob Montgomery

Janie Fricke singles chronology
"It Ain't Easy Bein' Easy" (1982)	"You Don't Know Love" (1983)	"He's a Heartache (Looking for a Place to Happen)" (1983)

"You Don't Know Love" is a song written by Don King and Beckie Foster, and recorded by American country music artist Janie Fricke. It was released in January 1983 as the second single from the album It Ain't Easy. The song reached #4 on the Billboard Hot Country Singles & Tracks chart.

== Chart performance ==
Chart (1983)	Peak position
US Hot Country Songs (Billboard)	4
Canadian RPM Country Tracks	3
