= Jeff Silbar =

Songwriter

Jeff Silbar is a songwriter. Silbar, a native of Los Angeles, won the Grammy Award for Song of the Year in 1990 for co-writing Bette Midler's "Wind Beneath My Wings" with Larry Henley.

== Notable compositions ==
- "All My Life" (Kenny Rogers)
- "He's a Heartache (Looking for a Place to Happen)" (Janie Fricke)
- "I Know What I've Got" (J.C. Crowley)
- "Then Again" (Alabama)
- "Tie Our Love (In a Double Knot)" (Dolly Parton)
- "Til I Loved You" (Restless Heart)
- "Where Were You When I Was Falling in Love" (Lobo)
- "Wind Beneath My Wings" (Roger Whittaker, Perry Como, Willie Nelson, Colleen Hewett, Sheena Easton, Lou Rawls, Gladys Knight & the Pips, Gary Morris, Bette Midler, et al.)
- "Hard Feelings" (Fleetwood Mac)
- "You've Got a Good Love Comin'" (Lee Greenwood)
- "Zoom In" (Ringo Starr)
