= Bruce Channel =

American singer-songwriter (born 1940)

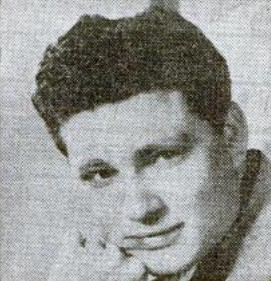
- Channel in 1962

Background information
- Born: Bruce McMeans; November 28, 1940 (age 85); Jacksonville, Texas, U.S.
- Genres: Rock and roll, pop, rockabilly, country
- Occupations: Singer, songwriter
- Years active: 1959 – early 1970s, and semi-active later
- Labels: LeCam, Smash, Collectables, Mercury

Bruce Channel (/ʃəˈnɛl/ shə-NEL; born November 28, 1940) is an American singer-songwriter best known for his 1962 number-one hit record "Hey! Baby".

== Early life ==
Channel was born in Jacksonville, Texas. He was born into a musical family who sang, and his father could also play harmonica, and by the time he was five years old could sing and play guitar, having learned from a cousin who lived in the family home. While he was still in high school, his family moved to Dallas, where he played concerts at benefit shows and youth centers. When he was seventeen, he worked at a butane tank company called Texas Tank with his older brother.

== Career ==
Channel performed originally for the radio program Louisiana Hayride and then joined with the harmonica player Delbert McClinton, singing country music. Channel was a regular on the program for six months, and as he remained in Texas, he would have to travel by train there every Saturday morning. He was paid $16.50 a show, but because he then had to pay $11.66 for a train ticket back to Texas, and $1.50 for union dues, Channel would only have less than $4 by the time he got back home.

Channel wrote "Hey! Baby" with Margaret Cobb in 1959 and performed the song for two years before recording it for Fort Worth record producer Bill Smith. It was issued originally on Smith's LeCam label, but as it started to sell well, it was acquired for distribution by Smash Records, a subsidiary of Mercury. The song went to number one in the US in March 1962 and held that position for three weeks. Besides topping the U.S. popular music charts, it also became number two in the United Kingdom. It sold more than one million copies and was awarded a gold disc. Channel had four more singles on the Billboard Hot 100, including "Number One Man" (which peaked at number 52), "Come On Baby" (number 98), "Going Back to Louisiana" (number 89), and "Mr. Bus Driver" (number 90, produced by Dale Hawkins in Memphis and recorded by Terry Manning), but none of them was as successful as "Hey! Baby", and he is considered a one-hit wonder.

Channel toured Europe and was assisted at one gig by the Beatles, who were then little known. John Lennon, who had "Hey! Baby" on his jukebox, was fascinated by McClinton's harmonica. A popular legend is that Lennon was taught to play harmonica by McClinton, but by that time Lennon had already been playing the instrument live for some time. The harmonica segment in "Hey! Baby" inspired Lennon's playing on the Beatles' first single, 1962's "Love Me Do", as well as later Beatles records, and the harmonica break on Frank Ifield's "I Remember You."

Channel's only other top 40 recording in the UK Singles Chart was "Keep On" (June 1968), which reached number 12; it was written by Wayne Carson Thompson and produced by Dale Hawkins. "Keep On" also charted in Australia. Channel disliked touring, so he settled as a songwriter in Nashville, scoring a number of Broadcast Music Incorporated award-winning songs during the 1970s and 1980s – "As Long As I'm Rockin' with You", for John Conlee; "Don't Worry 'bout Me Baby", for Janie Fricke; "Party Time", for T. G. Sheppard; "You're the Best", for Kieran Kane; and "Stand Up", for Mel McDaniel. In 1987, "Hey! Baby" was featured in the popular movie Dirty Dancing.

In 1995, Channel recorded his cover of the song "Stand Up" for the Memphis-based record label Ice House. Delbert McClinton reprised his harmonica role on it and several other tracks, including another version of "Hey! Baby". Channel then recorded a project in 2002 with the singer-songwriter Larry Henley (ex-Newbeats), billed as Original Copy.

Channel was inducted into the Rockabilly Hall of Fame. He continues to perform in cruises with other 1960s musicians.

== Personal life ==
In 1970, Channel met his wife, Christina, who worked for an agency opeated by Arthur Howe, who had booked Channel for a tour with The Beach Boys. They got married in August 1971, and are still married today. They have lived in Nashville, Tennessee since 1978.

== Discography ==
=== Albums ===
Year	Month	Label	Title	Notes
1962	March	Smash	Hey! Baby	US release / Mono
1968	?	Sonet	Goin' Back To Louisiana	UK release
1968	December	Bell	Keep On	UK release / released in both Mono and Stereo

=== Singles ===
Year	Month	Label	A-side	B-side	Notes
1959	April	Teen Ager	"Run, Romance, Run"	"Don't Leave Me"	
1959	December	King	"Will I Ever Love Again"	"Slow Down Baby"	
1960	March	King	"Now Or Never"	"Boy! This Stuff Kills Me"	
1961	?	Le Cam	"Hey! Baby"	"Dream Girl"	
1961	December	Smash	"Hey! Baby"	"Dream Girl"	Re-issue of Le Cam single made earlier that year / Issued in the UK in March 1962, and re-issued in UK on 25 October 1968 with "Come On Baby" as B-side.
1962	March	King	"Now Or Never"	"Will I Ever Love Again"	Re-issue of the A-sides from Channel's two singles released by King in 1959 and 1960 / released as "Bruce Channel and his Band"
1962	March	Manco	"Run, Romance, Run"	"Don't Leave Me"	Re-issue of Channel's first single from 1959 / Issued in the UK in May 1962.
1962	April	Smash	"Number One Man"	"If Only I Had Known"	Also released on Le Cam records / Issued in the UK in May 1962.
1962	June	Smash	"Come On Baby"	"Mine Exclusively"	Also released on Le Cam records.
1962	September	Smash	"Somewhere In This Town"	"Stand Tough"	Also released on Le Cam records in reverse order.
1962	December	Smash	"Oh! Baby"	"Let's Hurt Together"	Also released on Le Cam records.
1963	May	Smash	"So Tough"	"Night People"	Also released on Le Cam records in reverse order.
1963	May	Smash	"No Other Baby"	"Night People"	
1963	August 14	Smash	"The Dipsy Doodle"	"Send Her Home"	
1964	?	Shalimar	"I Don't Wanta"	"Blue And Lonesome"	First issued in the UK on 6 September 1963.
1964	January	Le Cam	"Going Back To Louisiana"	"Forget Me Not"	Issued in the UK on 14 February 1964
1964	March	Le Cam	"My Baby"	"Blue Monday"	
1964	March 30	Mel-o-dy	"Satisfied Mind"	"That's What's Happenin'"	
1964	July 29	Mel-o-dy	"You Make Me Happy"	"You Never Looked Better"	
1964	August	Shah	"Stand Tough"	"Court Of Love"	
1965	?	Brownfield	"Don't Let Go"	"My Prayer"	
1965	?	Tiris	"Baby Heartbreak"	"So Tough"	
1965	February	Smash	"Hey! Baby"	"Number One Man"	Re-issue of "Hey! Baby" with 1962 A-side "Number One Man" as B-side
1965	May	Jade	"My Baby's Gone"	"It's Me"	
1966	?	Charay	"Baby, Please Come Back"	"Baby Heartbreak"	
1966	July	Brownfield	"Don't Go"	"The Actor"	
1967	?	Charay	"Hey! Baby '67"	"Tipped Out"	Issued in the UK on 17 November 1967, and re-issued in UK in 1979.
1967	November	Mala	"Mr. Bus Driver"	"It's Me"	Features 1965 recording "It's Me" as B-side / Issued in UK on 22 November 1968 with "The Trouble With Sam" as B-side.
1968	?	Charay	"One Letter At A Time"	"Baby Heartbreak"	Features 1966 recording "Baby Heartbreak" as B-side
1968	?	Soft	"Hey! Baby '68"	"Hey Paula '68"	Features the recording of "Hey Paula" by Paul & Paula as B-side
1968	January	Charay	"The Times"	"Baby Heart Break"	
1968	February	Mala	"Keep On"	"Barbara Allen"	Issued in the UK on 10 May 1968.
1968	June	Mala	"California"	"Water The Family Tree"	
1968	October	Mala	"Nobody"	"Try Me"	"Try Me" was issued in the UK on 4 October 1968 with "Water The Family Tree" as B-side
1969	?	Shalimar	"Don't Let Go"	"What You Going To Do"	
1969	August	Mala	"The Web"	"Mrs. P"	
1970	?	Blackfoot	"To Please Me"	"Land Of Fu-Shon"	
1970	?	Soft	"Kiss And Run"	"Don't Let Go"	Features 1969 A-side "Don't Let Go" as B-side / Issued in UK on 17 January 1975.
1970	?	Blackfoot	"Nita Maria"	"Sweet Sound Of Your Crying"	
1970	?	Charay	"Maybellene"	"One Letter At A Time"	Features 1968 A-side "One Letter At A Time" as a B-side
1971	?	Le Cam	"Hey! Baby"	"Hey Paula"	Re-issue of 1968 double feature single with "Hey Paula" by Paul & Paula as B-side / Issued in UK in reverse order on 21 November 1980.
1973	?	Jamie	"Going Back To Louisiana"	"The Times"	Re-issue of "Going Back To Louisiana" with 1968 A-side "The Times" as B-side
1976	?	NAP	"Sunshine"	"Hi-Heel Sneakers"	
1978	?	Le Cam	"These Boots Are Made for Walkin'"	"Somewhere In This Town"	Features 1962 A-side "Somewhere In This Town" as B-side
1978	?	Le Cam	"Hey! Baby"	"Going Back To Louisiana"	Re-issue of "Hey! Baby" with "Going Back To Louisiana", previously issued as an A-side, as B-side

=== UK-only releases ===
Year	Month	Label	A-side	B-side	Notes
1971	January 15	CBS	"Drivin'"	"Oo Mama"	
1971	September 10	Epic	"Read The Signs"	"Everybody"	
1985	January	Old Gold	"Captain of Your Ship"	"Keep On"	Double feature artist with "Captain of Your Ship" by Reparata and the Delrons as A-side.

== See also ==
- List of 1960s one-hit wonders in the United States
- List of artists who reached number one in the United States
- List of performers on Top of the Pops
