= She's Single Again =

Single by Janie Fricke

from the album Somebody Else's Fire
- B-side: ""The Only Thing You Took Away"
- Released: April 1985
- Genre: Country
- Length: 2:44
- Label: Columbia
- Songwriter(s): Peter McCann, Charlie Craig
- Producer(s): Bob Montgomery

Janie Fricke singles chronology
"The First Word in Memory Is Me" (1985)	"She's Single Again" (1985)	"Somebody Else's Fire" (1985)

"She's Single Again" is a song written by Peter McCann and Charlie Craig and recorded by American country music artist Janie Fricke. It was released in May 1985 as the first single from the album Somebody Else's Fire. The song reached #2 on the Billboard Hot Country Singles chart. The song was also recorded by Reba McEntire for her 1985 album, Have I Got a Deal for You.

== Chart performance ==
Chart (1985)	Peak position
US Hot Country Songs (Billboard)	2
Canadian RPM Country Tracks	2
