= Do Me with Love =

Single by Janie Fricke

from the album Sleeping with Your Memory
- B-side: "If You Could See Me Now"
- Released: November 1981
- Genre: Country
- Length: 2:52
- Label: Columbia
- Songwriter(s): John Schweers
- Producer(s): Jim Ed Norman

Janie Fricke singles chronology
"I'll Need Someone to Hold Me (When I Cry)" (1981)	"Do Me with Love" (1981)	"Don't Worry 'bout Me Baby" (1982)

"Do Me with Love" is a song written by John Schweers, and recorded by American country music artist Janie Fricke. It was released in November 1981 as the second single from her album Sleeping with Your Memory. The song reached #4 on the Billboard Hot Country Singles chart and #1 on the RPM Country Tracks chart in Canada.

== Charts ==
Chart (1981–1982)	Peak position
US Hot Country Songs (Billboard)	4
Canadian RPM Country Tracks	1
