= Intersound Records =

American independent record label

- Founded: 1982
- Founder: Don Johnson
- Defunct: 1996
- Status: Acquired by Platinum Entertainment
- Location: Roswell, Georgia

Intersound Records was an American independent record label that operated in the 1980s and 1990s.

The company was founded by industry veteran Don Johnson in 1982, who purchased some assets of Pickwick Records from its parent company and named his new label Intersound. The company initially focused on releasing licensed recordings of classical music, but gradually moved towards signing contemporary artists until the classical releases, which had once made 95% of the company's revenue, accounted for just 5% of sales. Intersound pursued a unique business model of primarily selling directly to retailers via an in-house distribution system, instead of partnering with a third-party distributor as major labels typically did. Intersound was headquartered in Roswell, Georgia, where it operated a large production and warehousing facility. It became known for its budget recordings and yellow spines with bold, sans-serif, all-capital spine titles with stock numbers on a red field. They signed Kansas in 1992 and released their albums Live at the Whisky (1992) and Freaks of Nature (1995). In 1992, they entered the world music market with their Distant Winds series. In November 1996, Platinum Entertainment acquired Intersound in a $29 million cash and debt deal. In its last full fiscal year, Intersound had $33 million in revenue, with $3.2 million in gross profit.
