= Tell Me a Lie =

1983 single by Janie Fricke

Single by Sami Jo

from the album It Could Have Been Me
- B-side: "Stay Where You Are"
- Released: February 1974
- Recorded: 1973
- Genre: Pop
- Label: MGM South
- Songwriters: Mickey Buckins, Barbara Wyrick
- Producer: Sonny Limbo

Sami Jo singles chronology
"Tell Me a Lie" (1974)	"It Could Have Been Me" (1974)

"Tell Me a Lie"

Single by Janie Fricke

from the album Love Lies
- B-side: "Love Have Mercy"
- Released: September 17, 1983
- Genre: Country
- Length: 3:35
- Label: Columbia
- Songwriters: Mickey Buckins, Barbara Wyrick
- Producer: Bob Montgomery

Janie Fricke singles chronology
"He's a Heartache (Looking for a Place to Happen)" (1983)	"Tell Me a Lie" (1983)	"Let's Stop Talkin' About It" (1984)

"Tell Me a Lie" is a song composed by Mickey Buckins and Barbara Wyrick. Originally recorded by Lynn Anderson for her 1974 What a Man My Man Is album, it was released later that same year as a single by Sami Jo Cole, who took it to number 21 on both of the major U.S. pop charts. It also charted in Canada (#17). Cole's version was also an Adult Contemporary hit, reaching number 14 in the U.S. and number 27 in Canada.

Janie Fricke covered the song in 1983 and topped the U.S. country singles charts with it.

== Chart history ==
=== Weekly charts ===
Weekly chart performance for "Tell Me a Lie"
Chart (1974)	Peak position
Australia (Kent Music Report)	43
Canada RPM Top Singles	17
Canada RPM Adult Contemporary	27
US Billboard Hot 100	21
US Billboard Adult Contemporary	14
US Billboard Country	52
US Cash Box Top 100	21

=== Year-end charts ===
Year-end chart performance for "Tell Me a Lie"
Chart (1974)	Rank
Canada RPM Top Singles	157
US (Joel Whitburn's Pop Annual)	162

== Later versions ==
In 1981, Bettye LaVette recorded an R&B version of the song on Motown. It was released as the title track of her album the following year.

== Janie Fricke cover ==
In 1983, Janie Fricke picked up the song "Tell Me a Lie" as to be released as her next single in 1983. Originally included on Fricke's 1982 album It Ain't Easy, it was released in September 1983 as the first single from her album Love Lies. During this time, Fricke racked up a good number of hits, like "It Ain't Easy Bein' Easy" and "I Need Someone to Hold Me When I Cry".

Shortly thereafter, Fricke's record producer at the time Billy Sherrill, had suggested that Fricke would record the song. Listening to Sherrill, Fricke recorded the song in 1983. By this time though, Fricke had produced a number 1 hit in 1983 called "It Ain't Easy Bein' Easy". Fricke soon released "Tell Me a Lie" as a single on the country charts that year.

By 1983, "Tell Me a Lie" was Janie Fricke's fourth number one hit on the Country charts. The song and its album that it was featured on titled It Ain't Easy became very successful and became one of Fricke's signature songs. Since the song's release, it has been included in numerous multi-artist compilation albums. Despite the song's pop production, as well as its success on the country charts, it did not reach the pop singles chart. In 2004, Fricke released a bluegrass album, entitled The Bluegrass Sessions, which featured remakes of Fricke's biggest hits. The album featured "Tell Me a Lie".

== Chart performance ==
Chart performance for "Tell Me a Lie" by Janie Fricke
Chart (1983–1984)	Peak position
Canadian RPM Country Tracks	1
US Hot Country Songs (Billboard)	1
