= Don't Worry 'bout Me Baby =

Single by Janie Fricke

from the album Sleeping with Your Memory
- B-side: "Always"
- Released: April 1982
- Recorded: 1981
- Genre: Country
- Length: 2:28
- Label: Columbia; 02859
- Songwriter(s): Deborah Allen, Bruce Channel and Kieran Kane
- Producer(s): Jim Ed Norman

Janie Fricke singles chronology
"Do Me with Love" (1981)	"Don't Worry 'bout Me Baby" (1982)	"It Ain't Easy Bein' Easy" (1982)

"Don't Worry 'bout Me Baby" is a song written by Deborah Allen, Bruce Channel and Kieran Kane, and recorded by American country music artist Janie Fricke. It was released in April 1982 as the second single from the album Sleeping with Your Memory. The song was the first of Fricke's, seven solo number ones on Billboard magazine Hot Country Singles chart.

Fricke had actually sung on several other No. 1 songs in the past, often as an uncredited background vocalist (for example, "Thinking of a Rendezvous" by Johnny Duncan). In addition, she had dueted with Charlie Rich on their 1978 No. 1 song, "On My Knees." However, this was Fricke's first No. 1 song to feature her solo talents.

== Charts ==
=== Weekly charts ===
Chart (1982)	Peak position
US Hot Country Songs (Billboard)	1
Canadian RPM Country Tracks	8

=== Year-end charts ===
Chart (1982)	Position
US Hot Country Songs (Billboard)	36
