= It Ain't Easy Bein' Easy =

Single by Janie Fricke

from the album It Ain't Easy
- B-side: "Little More Love"
- Released: August 1982
- Genre: Country
- Length: 3:40
- Label: Columbia
- Songwriter(s): Mark Gray; Les Taylor; Shawna Harrington-Burkhart
- Producer(s): Bob Montgomery

Janie Fricke singles chronology
"Don't Worry 'bout Me Baby" (1982)	"It Ain't Easy Bein' Easy" (1982)	"You Don't Know Love" (1983)

"It Ain't Easy Bein' Easy" is a song written by Mark Gray, Les Taylor and Shawna Harrington-Burkhart, and recorded by American country music artist Janie Fricke. It was released in August 1982 as the first single from the album It Ain't Easy. The song was Fricke's second number one on the country chart as a solo artist. The single went to number one for one week and spent a total of thirteen weeks on the country chart.

== Charts ==
Chart (1982)	Peak position
US Hot Country Songs (Billboard)	1
Canadian RPM Country Tracks	1
