= Down to My Last Broken Heart =

Single by Janie Fricke

from the album I'll Need Someone to Hold Me When I Cry
- B-side: "Every Time a Teardrop Falls"
- Released: November 1, 1980
- Genre: Country
- Length: 2:28
- Label: Columbia
- Songwriter(s): Chick Rains
- Producer(s): Jim Ed Norman

Janie Fricke singles chronology
"He's Out of My Life" (1980)	"Down to My Last Broken Heart" (1980)	"Pride" (1981)

"Down to My Last Broken Heart" is a song written by Chick Rains, and recorded by American country music artist Janie Fricke. It was released in November 1980 as the first single from the album I'll Need Someone to Hold Me When I Cry. The song reached #2 on the Billboard Hot Country Singles & Tracks chart.

== Chart performance ==
Chart (1980–1981)	Peak position
US Hot Country Songs (Billboard)	2
Canadian RPM Country Tracks	2
