= Janie Fricke =

American singer (born 1947)

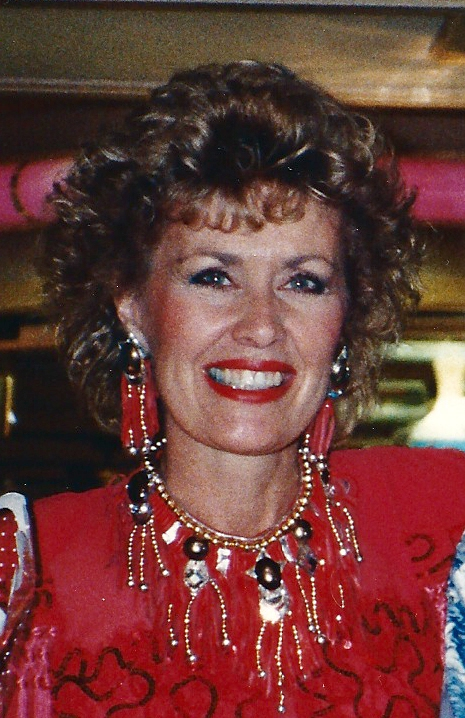
- Fricke in 2011
- Born: Jane Marie Fricke; December 19, 1947 (age 78); South Whitley, Indiana, U.S.
- Education: Indiana University Bloomington
- Occupations: Singer; producer; actress; clothing designer
- Years active: 1972–present
- Spouses: Randy Jackson (m. 1982, divorced); Jeff Steele (m. 1995)
- Musical career
- Also known as: Janie Frickie
- Genres: Country; country pop
- Instruments: Vocals; piano; guitar
- Labels: Columbia; Intersound; JMF; DM; New Music Deals
- Website: janiefricke.com

Jane Marie Fricke (/ˈfrɪki/ FRIK-ee; born December 19, 1947), known professionally as Janie Fricke, (Note: Fricke spelled her last name "Frickie" on some of her albums.) is an American country music singer, record producer, and clothing designer. Nineteen of her singles placed in the top 10 of the US Billboard Hot Country Songs chart. Nine of these songs reached the number-one spot. She has also won accolades from the Academy of Country Music and Country Music Association, and has been nominated for four Grammy Awards.

Fricke was born and raised in Indiana. She was surrounded by music from a young age and began performing locally. Fricke attended Indiana University Bloomington, where she participated in the vocal group the Singing Hoosiers. Her participation in the organization led to further opportunities as a commercial jingle singer. She later moved to Nashville, Tennessee, where she was hired as part of a background vocal group called the Lea Jane Singers. As part of the quartet, Fricke sang background vocals on songs recorded by country artists in the 1970s. On one occasion, Fricke was asked to sing a solo part on a song by Johnny Duncan called "Stranger". It was released as a single and her uncredited vocal part attracted attention within the country music community. Nashville record label Columbia Records took particular interest in Fricke and signed her to a solo contract in 1977.

Fricke's early material explored diverse styles of music. Unsure of how to identify her material, disc jockeys gave her singles limited airplay. Songs like "What're You Doing Tonight" failed to become major hits, and her producer suggested that she focus on one musical style. With a focus centered on ballads, Fricke's next releases proved to be successful. In 1981, she reached the top 10 of the country charts with the song "Down to My Last Broken Heart". Over the next decade, Fricke had a series of top-10 country singles. Six of these songs reached the number-one spot, including "Don't Worry 'Bout Me Baby", "Tell Me a Lie", and "Your Heart's Not in It". In the 1980s, Fricke also acted on The Dukes of Hazzard television series and designed belts and other clothing products.

In the early 1990s, Fricke left Columbia Records and signed with the smaller Intersound label. During the early 1990s, the label released three albums of her material, including a collection of gospel songs called Crossroads: Hymns of Faith (1992). At the end of the decade, Fricke formed her own record label and released several albums of material beginning with Bouncin' Back (2000). In 2004, she revived her catalog with a reworking of her former hits on the studio album The Bluegrass Sessions. Fricke has since continued to perform and record, most recently releasing a Christmas collection in 2020 called A Cowgirl Country Christmas.

== Early life ==
Jane Marie Fricke was born in South Whitley, Indiana, United States, to parents Waldemar and Phyllis Fricke. Both her parents had an appreciation for music. Her father taught her to play the guitar, while her mother taught her the piano. Her mother often brought home sheet music that Fricke would play and sing. "All I ever wanted to do was sing," she told author Sheree Homer in 2019. Fricke also performed outside the home at school functions. Inspired by folk artists Joan Baez and Judy Collins, Fricke also performed at local coffeehouses with her guitar. After high school, Fricke attended Indiana University Bloomington. While at college, Fricke joined the student performance group the Singing Hoosiers. The group performed nationally and internationally. Following a rehearsal, she saw an advertisement that was looking for singers who could record commercial jingles. Fricke eventually took the position and later performed commercial jingles for national advertisement campaigns including Red Lobster. In 1972, Fricke graduated from Indiana University with a bachelor's degree in elementary education.

== Career ==
=== 1972–1979: Background singing and early releases at Columbia Records ===
In 1972, Fricke moved to Los Angeles, California, in hopes of finding work as a background singer for recording studios. She found limited opportunities in California, but did win a talent contest. Watching the contest that day was a country music producer who offered Fricke a secretarial job if she moved to Nashville, Tennessee. Fricke accepted and moved to Nashville in 1975. While working as a secretary, she auditioned for the Lea Jane Singers, a singing quartet who added background vocals to Nashville recording sessions. Fricke joined the quartet and sang soprano.

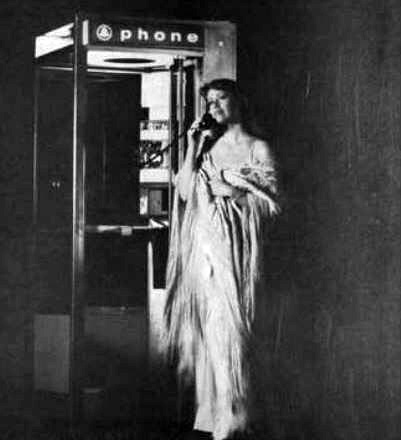
Fricke in a trade advertisement for her debut single, 1977

During the mid-1970s, Fricke appeared on more than 5,000 records as part of the Lea Jane Singers, making an estimated $100,000 per year. The quartet added backing vocals to the sessions of artists like Lynn Anderson, Elvis Presley and Tanya Tucker. In 1976, Fricke recorded a solo background vocal to Johnny Duncan's top-five country hit "Stranger". Fricke was not credited on the single's release, but her solo interested radio listeners and disc jockeys. She also sang background on several more Duncan records, including "Thinkin' of a Rendezvous" and "It Couldn't Have Been Any Better". Her solo vocal got the attention of Columbia Records, which offered her a recording contract as a solo artist, but Fricke was hesitant about becoming a solo artist and chose not to accept the offer right away. After consulting friends for advice, Fricke accepted the contract and signed with Columbia in 1977.

Fricke began working with producer Billy Sherrill at the label. He recorded Fricke's debut single called "What're You Doing Tonight". It only reached number 21 on the Billboard Hot Country Songs chart, but led to Fricke's first nomination from the Grammy Awards. In March 1978, Columbia released her debut studio album Singer of Songs. The disc spawned two more charting singles, including a cover of Hank Locklin's "Please Help Me, I'm Falling (In Love with You)". The cover reached number 12 on the Billboard country chart and number four on Canada's RPM country chart. In her early days at Columbia, Fricke continued providing background and harmony work to other performers. In 1978, she was featured in the background of Charlie Rich's "On My Knees". This time, she was given credit on the single's release. The song later topped the Billboard country chart. Her other credits at this time included backing vocals for Kenny Rogers on his hit album "Love or Something Like It."

In March 1979, Fricke's second album, Love Notes, was released. Her second to be produced by Sherrill, Love Notes mixed the stylings of traditional country with country pop. Of its three singles, only "I'll Love Away Your Troubles for a While" reached the top 20 in the United States. On Canada's RPM chart, the same song climbed to the number four spot. Later in 1979, Fricke's fourth album was released called From the Heart. The disc included new material but also included covers that ranged in material from Doris Day to Johnny Rodriguez. By this point, Fricke was having challenges establishing a musical identity. With a diverse musical output, disc jockeys were unsure about playing her records. Critics also took notice of her versatality. AllMusic's Jim Worbois commented, "Fricke has a big voice and gives the impression she can do a lot with it. She just never gets around to it on this record. Maybe it's the songs or maybe the arrangements, but she never seems to get into these songs or comes close to putting any emotion in her performances."

=== 1980–1989: Commercial peak ===
Fricke's uncertainty with her musical direction prompted producer Billy Sherrill to suggest that Fricke choose one style to record. In 1980, she started focusing on ballads and teamed with producer Jim Ed Norman. He produced her next single "Down to My Last Broken Heart". It climbed to the number-two spot on the Billboard and RPM country charts. The track was released on her fifth studio record titled I'll Need Someone to Hold Me When I Cry (1980), which became her first to chart the Billboard country albums survey. The album was a collection of ballads recorded in a country two-step style. The disc's title track became a top-five single on the American country songs chart in 1981. Her 1981 album Sleeping with Your Memory offered a similar musical style and featured her first number-one Billboard hit "Don't Worry 'bout Me Baby".

In 1982, Fricke collaborated with producer Bob Montgomery and transitioned towards an up-tempo country-pop sound. This was represented on her seventh studio disc It Ain't Easy. Writers Mary A. Bufwack and Robert K. Oermann described her new approach as a "tougher, huskier style" while author Kurt Wolff called it "bouncy" and "clean cut". The disc reached number 15 on the Billboard country LP's chart and spawned the number one hits "He's a Heartache (Looking for a Place to Happen)" and the title track. Fricke followed it with 1983's Love Lies. The disc climbed to number 10 on the Billboard country chart, her highest-charting LP yet. It also spawned the up-tempo number-one country single "Let's Stop Talkin' About It" and the number-one country ballad "Tell Me a Lie". Fricke reflected on the success brought on by her stylistic changes: "I guess ballads are my favorites, too, although I can handle medium-tempo things pretty good, too." Fricke was also a top-selling concert attraction during this period. Her stage shows often featured movement and brightly colored outfits. Fricke's popularity led to her winning the Female Vocalist of the Year accolade from the Country Music Association in both 1982 and 1983.

"Tell Me a Lie"
In the 1980s, Janie Fricke had a string of top-10 and number-one country songs. In 1983, "Tell Me a Lie" reached the top spot on the North American country charts.

Fricke joined Merle Haggard in 1984 to add harmony and background vocals to his album It's All in the Game. She was given credit on the release of Haggard's single "A Place to Fall Apart", which climbed to number one on American and Canadian country charts. Fricke provided similar harmony work to George Jones's 1984 LP Ladies' Choice. During the decade, she also collaborated on a duet with Ray Charles called "Who Cares". A duet with Larry Gatlin titled "From Time to Time (It Feels Like Love Again)" made the top 40 of the Billboard country chart.

In 1984, she teamed up again with Bob Montgomery for her eighth album The First Word in Memory. It included her next number-one single "Your Heart's Not in It", Fricke returned to a traditional country approach for her next album Somebody Else's Fire. In describing the project's material, Fricke told the Chicago Tribune, "They have more of a medium beat and basic country feel. We even use a steel guitar on a couple of them.". James Crispell of AllMusic praised its musical approach: "[a] typically fine collection of tunes from one of the finest contemporary country singers of the '80s." The album spawned the top-five American and Canadian country songs "She's Single Again", "Easy to Please", and the title track. In 1986, Fricke collaborated with producer Norro Wilson for her next studio offering Black & White. Kurt Wolff of Country Music: The Rough Guide noticed a "bluesier and almost gutsier vocal sound" on the disc. The album became her first to reach the top of the Billboard country LP's chart. Its lead single "Always Have, Always Will" reached number one in the United States and Canada.

By the late 1980s, Fricke had become frustrated with people mispronouncing her last name. On her next several releases, she changed the spelling of it to "Frickie": "We decided that since people like Phil Collins from England and Charlie Daniels can't pronounce my name -- they always say Frick -- we'd spell it 'Frickie' on the new album. That'll teach them," she told The Washington Post. Her 1987 album After Midnight was her second to feature her new last name. It was also her second produced by Norro Wilson. The record's lead single was a cover of the Rusty Draper pop hit "Are You Satisfied". It became her last to reach the Billboard country top 40. She returned in 1988 with a collection of ballads titled Saddle the Wind, which charted at number 64 on the Billboard country LP's chart. Her final album with Columbia Records was 1989's Labor of Love, which also reached number 64 on the country LP's chart. Both singles released from the record peaked outside the country top 40, with "Give 'em My Number" being her last to chart in the United States.

=== 1990–present: Move to independent albums ===
In 1990, Fricke was dropped by Columbia Records. Following her departure, she worked theaters in Branson, Missouri, a city that drew audiences that had an appreciation for veteran country performers. "The records I've had are career records, and that's why I get to keep working. I'm lucky that way, and I hope to work another 10 years this way," she told The Journal Times. In 1992, Fricke signed with the smaller Intersound label. Her projects with Intersound were later distributed by their imprint label, Branson Entertainment. Her first Intersound release was a 1991 eponymous studio record. The album featured production credits from Fricke's then-husband Randy Jackson. The project spawned the single "I Want to Grow Old with You". It was her final single to make a major chart appearance, reaching number 74 on the RPM country survey. From 1991 to 1998, she was a regular performer for the Statler brothers show on TNN. For her next project, Fricke was encouraged by fans to record an album of gospel music. In 1992, she released the album Crossroads: Hymns of Faith. The disc was her first collection of gospel recordings in her career. Fricke's final Intersound/Branson release was 1993's Now & Then. The album was a revisited collection of Fricke's catalog in which she re-recorded her most well-known material.

In the new millennium, Fricke launched her own record label titled JMF. In 2000, she released her first JMF album called Bouncin' Back. The disc was produced by Fricke herself and contained contemporary country recordings. For the first time in her career, she promoted and sold the album entirely through the internet. In the early 2000s, a public interest started growing with Texas country music. This prompted Smith Music Group president Rick Smith to encourage several artists to record live albums for his label. Along with Roy Clark and Merle Haggard, Smith chose Fricke as an artist to join his roster. In 2002, Smith Music released Fricke's first live album titled Live at Billy Bob's Texas. The project was recorded at a dance hall in Fort Worth, Texas called "Billy Bob's", which first opened in 1981. The disc was sold exclusively on television and was promoted in partnership with the Dodge automotive company.

In 2004, Fricke recorded a new album project titled The Bluegrass Sessions. The disc was a re-recorded collection of her former hit singles that were produced in bluegrass format. The Bluegrass Sessions gathered a group of bluegrass pickers and session musicians who were often used in the genre. The project was released on DM Records in 2004. In 2012, it was re-released on New Music Deals and retitled as The Country Side of Bluegrass. Both bluegrass collections received mixed reviews from writers and journalists. AllMusic's Greg Adams gave The Bluegrass Sessions 4-1/2 out of five stars and praised its overall quality: "[Her biggest hits] adapt so well to the bluegrass treatment that traditionalists may prefer the remakes over the originals, especially since the arrangements hew closely to a traditional bluegrass sound with acoustic instrumentation, fiddles, and banjo." Meanwhile, NPR's Ken Tucker found her voice to have aged, but still had emotional depth. "Janie Fricke uses the urgency she feels to sustain her career to flood her bluegrass with compelling emotion," he concluded.

In 2008, Fricke returned to her own music label to release a studio album of new country recordings titled Roses & Lace. In the years that followed, she spent time touring and working on other projects outside of music. In 2020, she returned to recording with her first studio album of Christmas music titled A Cowgirl Country Christmas. Fricke produced the project, along with second husband Jeff Steele and assistant Sony Morris. The disc featured a lead single composed by Fricke titled "The Followers".

== Musical styles and voice ==
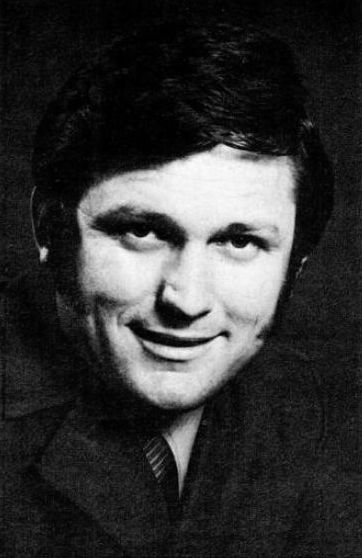
Fricke collaborated with Johnny Duncan on several songs.

Fricke's musical style is rooted in the country genre. She also incorporated elements of pop, adult contemporary and country pop. During her career, Fricke shifted between different styles as she worked with different producers. Her early Columbia singles were geared towards classic country, but she shifted towards country pop and adult contemporary with songs like "It Ain't Easy Bein' Easy", "Tell Me a Lie", and "If the Fall Don't Get You". Writers have described her style in terms of likability. Authors Mary A. Bufwack and Robert K. Oermann explained in 2003, "Janie was the sweet, smiley-voiced singer of likeable radio hits who tried to vamp up her image with flashy costumes and bouncy choreography. When the dust settled, she was still a sweet singer of likeable radio hits." AllMusic's Mark Deming remarked, "Though her most popular songs were rooted in country, she also had a gift for pop songs, and she could incorporate adult contemporary sounds into her recordings and still let her personality shine."

Fricke's vocal ability has also been the subject of discussion among music commentators. Mark Deming wrote, "Fricke had a high, clear voice that showed surprising strength and dramatic power, and she enjoyed success as a duet partner with Charlie Rich, Merle Haggard, and Johnny Duncan, as well as her own long run of singles." Bufwack and Oermann explained that in the early 1980s, her vocals strengthened as she cut "hard-edged material" that demonstrated the "finest" performances of her career. Meanwhile, writer Greg Adams commented that Fricke's experience as a background vocalist limited her uniqueness: "Certainly, Fricke is a talented vocalist who has sold many records, but she has not forged a unique identity with her music, and consequently the real allure of these singles is in the songwriting rather than the uniqueness of the performances."

== Other career ventures ==
In the 1980s, Fricke began taking career opportunities outside of music. In 1984, she started designing belts and clothes. Fricke's apparel was featured in several department stores during the decade. In regards to her different ventures she commented, "I am not a goal-setter. I would never do that. I just like to work hard and take it like it comes. Everything will work out for the best." Also in 1984, Fricke guest starred in one episode of The Dukes of Hazzard. She played the role of Ginny, a jewel thief who hid money in the dashboard of a getaway car that was later to become the General Lee. In 1985, Fricke established the Janie Fricke Scholarship at Indiana University to benefit gifted students in the School of Music. The scholarships are open to active members of the Singing Hoosiers vocal ensemble who demonstrate financial need. She has also participated in the Country Music Hall of Fame Fundraising Campaign with other artists such as Naomi Judd and Gretchen Wilson.

== Personal life ==
Fricke has been married twice. She began dating Johnny Rodriguez's road manager Randy Jackson in the early 1980s. Jackson proposed to Fricke over the telephone through a radio program. In September 1982, she wed Randy Jackson in a small ceremony at her mother's farm in South Whitley, Indiana. Hours after their wedding, Fricke gave a free concert to 7,000 fans at a local Indiana festival. Jackson later became Fricke's manager. For many years, the pair lived on an historic farm located in Lancaster, Texas, that was home to a variety of animals including buffalo. The pair later divorced, and she remarried musician Jeff Steele in 1995. Steele later became Fricke's manager and a drummer in her touring band. When she began performing with less frequency, Steele began a career in local politics and was elected mayor of Wilmer, Texas, in 2009.

== Discography ==
Studio albums

- Singer of Songs (1978)
- Love Notes (1979)
- From the Heart (1980)
- Nice 'n' Easy (with Johnny Duncan) (1980)
- I'll Need Someone to Hold Me When I Cry (1980)
- Sleeping with Your Memory (1981)
- It Ain't Easy (1982)
- Love Lies (1983)
- The First Word in Memory (1984)
- Somebody Else's Fire (1985)
- Black & White (1986)
- After Midnight (1987)
- Saddle the Wind (1988)
- Labor of Love (1989)
- Great Movie Themes (1991)
- Janie Fricke (1991)
- Crossroads: Hymns of Faith (1992)
- Now & Then (1993)
- Bouncin' Back (2000)
- Tributes to My Heroes (2003)
- The Bluegrass Sessions (2004)
- Golden Legends: Janie Fricke (2006)
- Roses & Lace (2008)
- A Cowgirl Country Christmas (2020)

== Filmography ==
Film and television appearances by Janie Fricke
Title	Year	Role	Notes	Ref.
The Dukes of Hazzard	1984	Ginny	Episode: "Happy Birthday, General Lee"	
The New Hollywood Squares	1986	Herself		

== Awards and nominations ==
Year	Nominee / work	Award	Result	Ref.
1977	Academy of Country Music	Top New Female Vocalist	Nominated	
1977	20th Annual Grammy Awards	Best Female Country Vocal Performance – "What're You Doing Tonight"	Nominated	
1978	21st Annual Grammy Awards	Best Country Performance by a Duo or Group with Vocal – (with Charlie Rich)	Nominated	
1978	Country Music Association	Female Vocalist of the Year	Nominated	
1978	Country Music Association	Vocal Duo of the Year – (with Johnny Duncan)	Nominated	
1979	Music City News Country	Best New Female Vocalist of the Year	Won	
1979	Country Music Association	Female Vocalist of the Year	Nominated	
1979	Country Music Association	Vocal Duo of the Year – (with Johnny Duncan)	Nominated	
1980	Country Music Association	Vocal Duo of the Year – (with Johnny Duncan)	Nominated	
1982	Academy of Country Music	Top Female Vocalist	Nominated	
1982	Country Music Association	Female Vocalist of the Year	Won	
1983	Academy of Country Music	Top Female Vocalist	Won	
1983	Music City News Country	Best Female Vocalist of the Year	Won	
1983	Country Music Association	Album of the Year – It Ain't Easy	Nominated	
1983	Country Music Association	Female Vocalist of the Year	Won	
1984	27th Annual Grammy Awards	Best Female Country Vocal Performance – "Your Heart's Not in It"	Nominated	
1984	Academy of Country Music	Top Female Vocalist	Nominated	
1984	Country Music Association	Female Vocalist of the Year	Nominated	
1984	American Music Awards of 1984	Favorite Country Female Artist	Nominated	
1985	28th Annual Grammy Awards	Best Female Country Vocal Performance – "She's Single Again"	Nominated	
1985	Country Music Association	Female Vocalist of the Year	Nominated	
1986	Academy of Country Music	Single Record of the Year – "Always Have, Always Will"	Nominated	
1986	Academy of Country Music	Top Female Vocalist	Nominated	
1986	Country Music Association	Female Vocalist of the Year	Nominated	
1986	American Music Awards of 1986	Favorite Country Female Video Artist	Nominated	
1987	American Music Awards of 1987	Favorite Country Female Video Artist	Nominated	
