= Bob Montgomery (songwriter) =

American singer, songwriter, record producer and publisher (1937–2014)

- Born: May 12, 1937; Lampasas, Texas, U.S.
- Died: December 4, 2014 (aged 78); Lee's Summit, Missouri, U.S.
- Occupations: Singer; songwriter; record producer; publisher

Bob Montgomery (May 12, 1937 – December 4, 2014) was an American singer, songwriter, record producer, and publisher.

== Career ==
Montgomery was born in Lampasas, Texas southwest of Waco. He was a songwriting partner and best friend of Buddy Holly and they performed together as the duo "Buddy and Bob" while teenagers in high school. Initially they played a variety of bluegrass music, which evolved into rockabilly sounds.

Montgomery met Holly at Hutchinson Junior High School in Lubbock, Texas, in 1949. They started playing together at school assemblies and on local radio shows. Montgomery sang lead and Holly harmonized. They soon had a weekly Sunday radio show on station KDAV in Lubbock. On October 14, 1955, Bill Haley & His Comets played a concert at Fair Park Auditorium and Montgomery, Holly, and bassist Larry Welborn were on the bill. Eddie Crandall, Marty Robbins' manager, spoke to Pappy Dave Stone, the owner of KDAV and told him that he was interested in working with Holly as a solo performer. Holly's career began after demo recordings of his music were made and sent to Decca Records.

Montgomery co-wrote some of Holly's songs including "Heartbeat", "Wishing", and "Love's Made a Fool of You". He wrote the pop standard "Misty Blue" and for Patsy Cline, "Back in Baby's Arms". His son Kevin recorded a version of the latter which appeared on his album True. Montgomery produced Bobby Goldsboro's 1968 number 1 hit "Honey" and his follow up 1973 number 9 UK hit, “Summer (The First Time)”.

Montgomery died on December 4, 2014, in Lee's Summit, Missouri next to Kansas City, of Parkinson's disease, at the age of 77.

== Discography ==
=== Singles ===
- "Taste of the Blues" b/w "Because I Love You", Brunswick, 9–55157, November 1959

=== Albums ===
- Holly in the Hills, Buddy Holly & Bob Montgomery, Coral, January 1965
