= Somebody Else's Fire =

Somebody Else's Fire may refer to:

- Somebody Else's Fire (song), a 1985 song by Janie Fricke
- Somebody Else's Fire (album), a 1985 album by Janie Fricke, featuring the song
