= Scott McIntyre =

Scott McIntyre may refer to:

- Scott McIntyre (politician) (born 1933), American politician in the state of Iowa
- Scott McIntyre (journalist), Australian football commentator

== See also ==
- Scott MacIntyre (born 1985), American singer, songwriter, and pianist
