= Only What I Feel =

Studio album by Patty Loveless
- Released: April 20, 1993
- Studios: GroundStar Laboratories and Woodland Digital (Nashville, Tennessee)
- Genre: Country
- Length: 34:54
- Label: Epic
- Producer: Emory Gordy Jr.

Patty Loveless chronology
Greatest Hits (1993)	Only What I Feel (1993)	When Fallen Angels Fly (1994)

Singles from Only What I Feel
- 1. "Blame It on Your Heart" Released: April 3, 1993; 2. "Nothin' but the Wheel" Released: July 1993; 3. "You Will" Released: November 11, 1993; 4. "How Can I Help You Say Goodbye" Released: March 19, 1994

Professional ratings
Review scores
Source	Rating
AllMusic	link
Entertainment Weekly	A+ link
Los Angeles Times	2/4 stars
Music Week	4/5 stars

Only What I Feel is the sixth studio album by American country music artist Patty Loveless and her first on the Epic Records label. It was released in 1993. Four tracks from the album made in into the Billboard top 20 country singles charts, including the #1 "Blame It on Your Heart" and the #3 "How Can I Help You Say Goodbye," later covered by Laura Branigan. The #6 hit "You Will" was originally recorded by Anne Murray as the title track of her 1990 album. The only single to not make the top ten was the #20 hit "Nothin' But The Wheel", considered by many Patty fans to be one of her finest works. The album peaked at #9, and was certified platinum for shipments of over 1,000,000 copies in the U.S. This album was Loveless' first album since she had surgery to repair burst nodes on her vocal cords in 1992.

== Track listing ==
No.	Title	Writer(s)	Length
1.	"You Will"	Pam Rose, Mary Ann Kennedy, Randy Sharp	3:16
2.	"How About You"	Chris Waters, Chuck Jones	2:41
3.	"Nothin' but the Wheel"	John Scott Sherrill	3:57
4.	"Love Builds the Bridges (Pride Builds the Walls)"	Jim McBride, Jerry Salley	3:32
5.	"Mr. Man in the Moon"	Wally Wilson, Mike Henderson	3:11
6.	"Blame It on Your Heart"	Harlan Howard, Kostas	3:34
7.	"You Don't Know How Lucky You Are"	Carl Jackson, David Wills	3:42
8.	"All I Need (Is Not to Need You)"	Will Robinson, Tim Nichols, Randy Scruggs	2:53
9.	"What's a Broken Heart"	Don Pfrimmer, George Teren	3:09
10.	"How Can I Help You Say Goodbye"	Burton Banks Collins, Karen Taylor-Good	4:59

== Content ==
The album produced four singles for Loveless, all of which reached top 20 on the U.S. country charts. Leading off the single releases was the Harlan Howard-Kostas co-write "Blame It on Your Heart," which in June 1993 became a Number One country hit. After it came "Nothin' but the Wheel," which peaked at #20 during the week of October 23, 1993. Peter Wolf covered the song on his record Sleepless. The album's third single was "You Will" at #6, followed by "How Can I Help You Say Goodbye" with a #3 peak in July 1994.

== Personnel ==
Adapted from liner notes.

- Patty Loveless – vocals
- Barry Beckett – keyboards
- John Barlow Jarvis – keyboards
- Mike Lawler – keyboards
- Gary Smith – keyboards
- Steve Gibson – electric guitar, mandolin
- Reggie Young – electric guitar
- Biff Watson – acoustic guitar
- Paul Franklin – steel guitar
- Sonny Garrish – steel guitar
- Emory Gordy Jr. – bass, string arrangements (10)
- Owen Hale – drums
- Stuart Duncan – fiddle
- John Catchings – cello (10)
- Jim Grosjean – viola (10)
- Kathryn Plummer – viola (10)
- Gary Vanosdale – viola (10)
- Kris Wilkinson – viola (10)
- David Angell – violin (10)
- David Davidson – violin (10)
- Connie Heard – violin (10)
- Christian Teal – violin (10)

Additional musicians

- Mike Bowden
- Tim Hensley
- Kenny Vaughan
- Pete Finney
- Eddy Anderson
- Carmella Ramsey

Background vocalists

- Kathy Burdick
- Joe Diffie
- Vince Gill
- Tim Hensley
- Kostas
- Alison Krauss
- Liana Manis
- Donna McElroy
- Carmella Ramsey
- Curtis Young

== Production ==
- Emory Gordy Jr. – producer
- Bob Bullock – recording
- Russ Martin – recording, overdub recording
- John Guess – mixing
- Terry Bates – recording assistant
- Amy Hughes – recording assistant, overdub assistant
- Keith Odle – recording assistant
- Marty Williams – mix assistant
- Milan Bogdan – editing
- Glenn Meadows – mastering
- Masterfonics (Nashville, Tennessee) – mixing, editing and mastering location
- Lauren Koch – production coordinator
- Bill Johnson – art direction
- Rollow Welch – design
- Victoria Pearson – photography
- Fitzgerald / Hartley Co. – management

== Charts ==
=== Weekly charts ===
Chart (1993–1994)	Peak position
US Billboard 200	63
US Top Country Albums (Billboard)	9

=== Year-end charts ===
Chart (1993)	Position
US Top Country Albums (Billboard)	54
Chart (1994)	Position
US Top Country Albums (Billboard)	41
