= Matt Giraud =

American singer-songwriter and musician (born 1985)

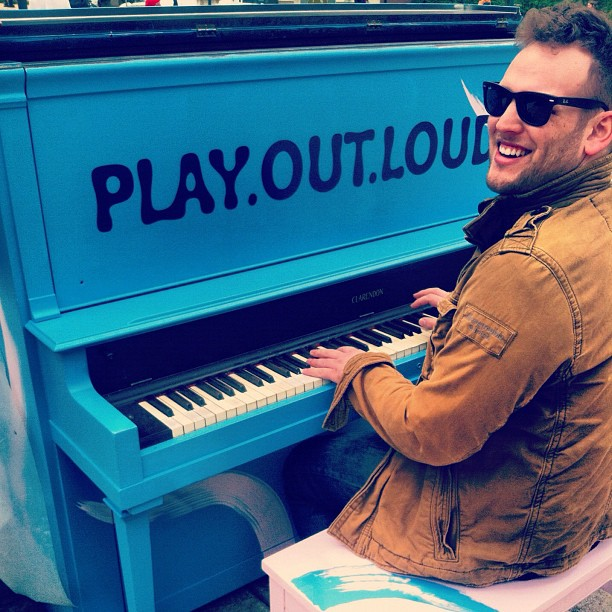

Background information
- Born: Matthew Scott Giraud; May 11, 1985 (age 41); Dearborn, Michigan, U.S.
- Origin: Kalamazoo, Michigan
- Genres: Soul, R&B, pop rock, blues
- Occupations: Singer-songwriter, musician
- Instruments: Vocals, piano, drums, guitar, keyboard
- Years active: 2003–present

Matthew Scott "Matt" Giraud (born May 11, 1985) is an American singer-songwriter, musician, and the fifth place finalist of the eighth season of the reality television series American Idol. He was the first recipient of the "judge' save", wherein the judges veto a contestant's elimination.

== Early life and education ==
Giraud was born in Dearborn, Michigan, but was raised in Ypsilanti and graduated from Lincoln High School in 2003. He is the son of Daniel Giraud and Kami Zoltanski, and has a sister, April. He started as a drummer, playing and singing in church in Ypsilanti.

Giraud played at clubs in Kalamazoo, where he also graduated from Western Michigan University. At the university, he was a part of the vocal jazz program, Gold Company.

== American Idol ==
=== Overview ===
Giraud auditioned for the eighth season of American Idol in Louisville, Kentucky. He was considered a judges' favorite in Hollywood, with Randy Jackson naming him among his "top 5" early favorites. During Hollywood week, he performed "I Want You Back" by The Jackson 5 as part of a group called "White Chocolate", along with fellow finalist, and future season 8 winner, Kris Allen. He did not make the finals initially, but was brought back for the Wild Card show. The judges unanimously lauded his performance of "Who's Lovin' You" by The Miracles (also made famous by The Jackson 5) and he became a part of the Top 13 (along with Anoop Desai, Megan Joy, and Jasmine Murray). Giraud was also the first and only recipient of the new judges' save for his season on April 15, 2009. After his Top 13 performance of "Human Nature", Kara DioGuardi remarked "I hope we see you for many more weeks." On Top 11 night, he performed "So Small", provoking Simon Cowell to state "I don't think you've had enough credit in this competition", and compare him to Michael Bublé. On the night of the Top 8, Giraud sang "Part-Time Lover". Paula Abdul kept her compliments short (due to time constraints), simply saying "Two words: Standing O". The next week, however, Giraud received poor reviews from Jackson and DioGuardi. The following night, the results revealed that he received the lowest number of votes. However, for the first time in American Idol history, the judges' save was invoked and Giraud was spared elimination when the judges utilized Season 8's new twist. The consequence of this, for all of the contestants, was a double elimination after the second Top 7 night. On that night, Giraud performed "Stayin' Alive" and received mixed reviews. Nevertheless, he survived the vote that week and even avoided placing in the Bottom 3. He was eliminated on April 29, 2009 and finished in fifth place. In interviews after his elimination, Giraud says that he believed the "'Idol' judges' save wasn't a waste". Giraud was a favorite of Joel Madden. It was also mentioned that Lady Gaga had told Matt she was sad to see him leave the show after being eliminated.

=== Performances/results ===
| Week # | Theme | Song choice | Original artist | Order # | Result |
| Audition | N/A | "I Don't Want to Be" | Gavin DeGraw | N/A | Advanced |
| Hollywood | First Solo | "Give Me One Reason" | Tracy Chapman | N/A | Advanced |
| Hollywood | Group Performance | "I Want You Back" | The Jackson 5 | N/A | Advanced |
| Hollywood | Second Solo | "Georgia on My Mind" | Hoagy Carmichael | N/A | Advanced |
| Top 36/Semi-final 2 | Billboard Hot 100 Hits to Date | "Viva la Vida" | Coldplay | 2 | Eliminated^{1} |
| Wild Card | N/A | "Who's Lovin' You" | The Miracles | 2 | Selected |
| Top 13 | Michael Jackson | "Human Nature" | Michael Jackson | 12 | Safe |
| Top 11 | Grand Ole Opry | "So Small" | Carrie Underwood | 11 | Safe |
| Top 10 | Motown | "Let's Get It On" | Marvin Gaye | 1 | Bottom 2^{2} |
| Top 9 | Top Downloads | "You Found Me" | The Fray | 6 | Safe |
| Top 8 | Year They Were Born | "Part-Time Lover" | Stevie Wonder | 7 | Safe |
| Top 7 | Songs from the Cinema | "Have You Ever Really Loved a Woman?" – Don Juan DeMarco | Bryan Adams | 4 | Saved^{3} |
| Top 7^{4} | Disco | "Stayin' Alive" | Bee Gees | 6 | Safe |
| Top 5 | Rat Pack Standards | "My Funny Valentine" | Mitzi Green | 3 | Eliminated |

- ^Note 1 Giraud was initially eliminated, as he did not receive enough votes to advance immediately into the Finals. However, on the March 4 results show, Kara DioGuardi selected him as one of the 8 Wild Card contenders.
- ^Note 2 When Ryan Seacrest announced the results in the particular night, Giraud was in the bottom three, but declared safe second when Michael Sarver was eliminated.
- ^Note 3 Giraud received the lowest number of votes; however, the judges decided to use their one save for the season to allow him to remain in the competition, resulting in two eliminations the following week.
- ^Note 4 Due to the judges using their one save to save Giraud, the Top 7 remained intact for another week.

=== Post–Idol ===
Giraud appeared on The Tonight Show with Jay Leno and Today show on April 30, on The Ellen DeGeneres Show and Access Hollywood on May 4, and on Live with Regis and Kelly on May 6. On May 25, 2009, during a Larry King Live special featuring the Idol contestants who had finished in the top 10 that season, Giraud was named the "class clown" and the biggest flirt in the group.

Giraud performed with the rest of the eighth season contestants in American Idol Live Tour, running from July until September. Included in his set of songs were "Hard to Handle" by Otis Redding, "Georgia on My Mind" by Ray Charles, and "You Found Me" by The Fray. On March 11, 2010, on the American Idol "Results Show", Giraud performed "Tell Her About It" by Billy Joel with Scott MacIntyre.

== Career ==
Giraud released an album called Perspective in 2003 and another in 2006 called Mind, Body and Soul.

Giraud's first solo tour started at January 29, 2010 at the Forest Hills Fine Arts Center in Grand Rapids, Michigan.

On March 11, 2010, on the American Idol "Results Show", Giraud performed "Tell Her About It" by Billy Joel with Scott MacIntyre.

Giraud recorded a cover of the song "You Don't Know Me" with Anna Wilson.

On August 9, 2010 he was featured as vocal on "Thank You" released by Jim Brickman.

Giraud performed at the Grand Ole Opry in Nashville for the release of Anna Wilson's Countrypolitan Duets.

Giraud and July 3-0 were featured on DJ KELLR's song, "Jaded," that was released in January 2017.

== Discography ==
=== Albums ===
- 2003: Perspective
- 2006: Mind, Body and Soul

== Personal life ==
Giraud is a Christian, and attends Gracespring Bible Church (formerly Richland Bible Church).

== Awards and nominations ==
| Year | Presenter | Award | Result |
|---|---|---|---|
| 2009 | Teen Choice Awards | Choice Summer Tour (shared with American Idol Top 10) | Nominated |
