= American Idols Live! Tour 2009 =

2009 summer concert tour

- Tour by American Idol
- Start date: July 5, 2009
- End date: September 15, 2009
- No. of shows: 52
- Box office: US$30.1 million

American Idol concert chronology
- American Idols Live! Tour 2008 (2008); American Idols Live! Tour 2009 (2009); American Idols Live! Tour 2010 (2010)

The American Idols Live! Tour 2009 was a summer concert tour in the United States and Canada that featured the top 10 contestants of the eighth season of American Idol. The 52 date tour started on July 5, 2009 in Portland, Oregon and ended on September 15, 2009 in Manchester, New Hampshire.

== Performers ==
Kris Allen (winner)	Adam Lambert (runner-up)
Danny Gokey (3rd place)	Allison Iraheta (4th place)
Matt Giraud (5th place)	Anoop Desai (6th place)
Lil Rounds (7th place)	Scott MacIntyre (8th place)
Megan Joy (9th place)	Michael Sarver (10th place)

== Setlist ==
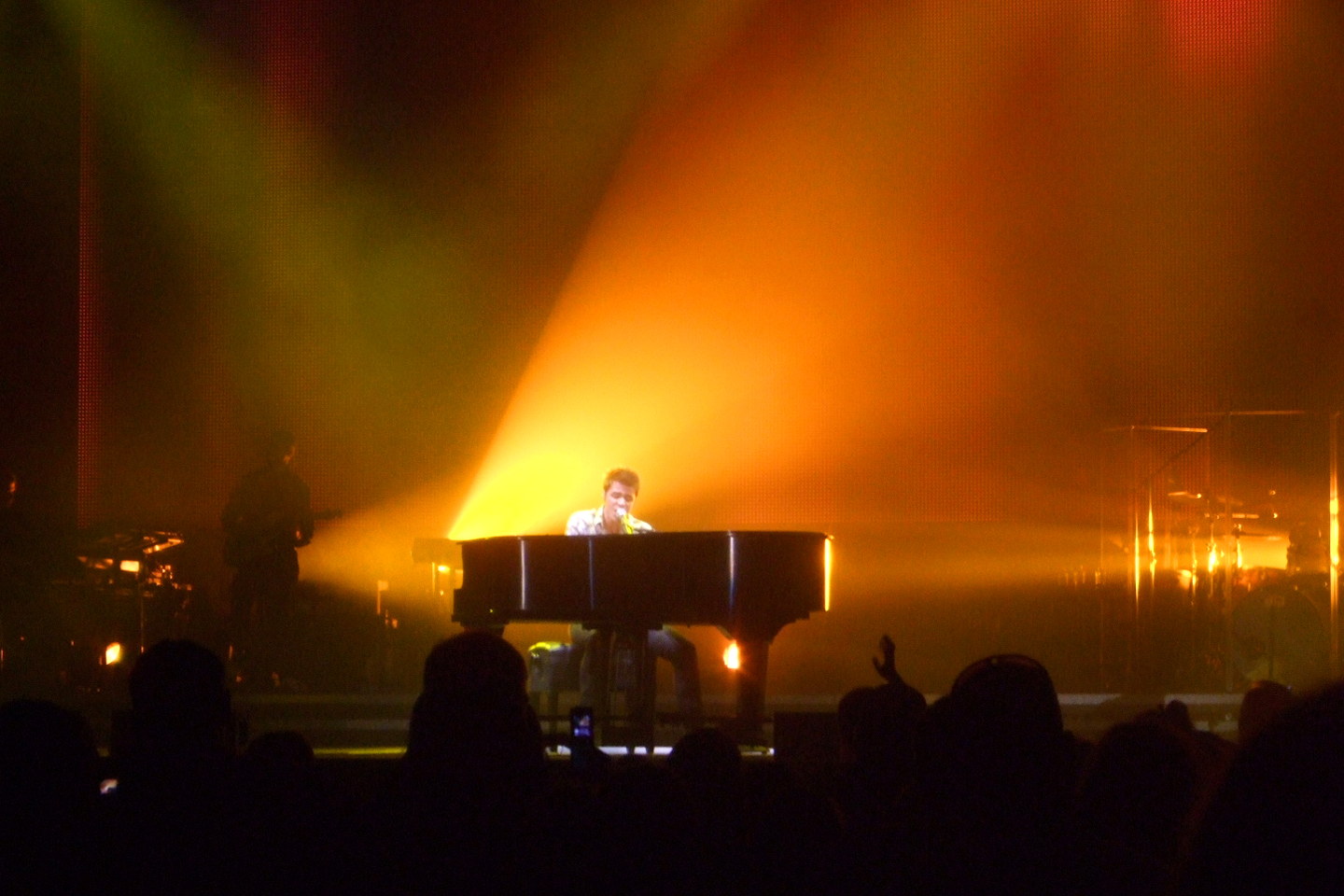
Kris Allen performing on tour

- Michael Sarver - "In Love with a Girl" (Gavin DeGraw), "Closer" (Ne-Yo)
- Megan Joy - "Put Your Records On" (Corinne Bailey Rae), "Tears Dry on Their Own" (Amy Winehouse)
- Scott MacIntyre - "Bend and Break" (Keane), "A Thousand Miles" (Vanessa Carlton)
- Lil Rounds - "Be Without You"/"Just Fine" (Mary J. Blige), "No One" (Alicia Keys) and "Single Ladies (Put a Ring on It)" (Beyoncé Knowles)
- Anoop Desai - "Always on My Mind" (Willie Nelson), "Mad" (Ne-Yo) and "My Prerogative" (Bobby Brown)
- Matt Giraud - "Hard to Handle" (Otis Redding/The Black Crowes), "Georgia on My Mind" (Ray Charles) and "You Found Me" (The Fray)
- Group medley - Megan & Lil "Can't Take My Eyes off You" (Frankie Valli), Matt & Scott "Tell Her About It" (Billy Joel), Michael & Anoop "Suspicious Minds" (Elvis Presley), Anoop, Matt, Lil, Scott, Megan & Michael "Beggin'", (The Four Seasons/Madcon)

Intermission

- Allison Iraheta - "So What" (Pink), "Cry Baby" (Janis Joplin), "Barracuda" (Heart)
- Danny Gokey - "P.Y.T. (Pretty Young Thing)" (Michael Jackson), "Maria Maria" (Santana), "What Hurts the Most" (Rascal Flatts), "My Wish" (Rascal Flatts)
- Adam Lambert - "Whole Lotta Love" (Led Zeppelin), "Starlight" (Muse), "Mad World" (Tears for Fears), "Slow Ride" with Allison Iraheta (Foghat), David Bowie medley ("Life on Mars?"/"Fame"/"Let's Dance")
- Kris Allen - "Heartless" (Kanye West), "All These Things That I've Done" (The Killers), "Bright Lights" (Matchbox Twenty), "Ain't No Sunshine" (Bill Withers), "Hey Jude" (The Beatles)
- Top 10 Group song - "Don't Stop Believin'" (Journey), "Na Na Hey Hey Kiss Him Goodbye" (Steam / Bananarama)

== Additional notes ==
- "No Boundaries" was dropped from Kris Allen's set starting on July 10, 2009 in Sacramento, California due to "poor audience response." The song was replaced with "All These Things That I've Done" by The Killers.
- Megan Joy did not perform the last group song in Los Angeles, California on July 16, 2009 due to food poisoning and being sent to the hospital shortly after her set but she did return for the rest of the tour after her recovery.

== Tour dates ==
Date	City	Country	Venue
July 5, 2009	Portland	United States	Rose Garden
July 7, 2009	Tacoma	United States	Tacoma Dome
July 8, 2009	Vancouver	Canada	General Motors Place
July 10, 2009	Sacramento	United States	ARCO Arena
July 11, 2009	Oakland	United States	Oracle Arena
July 12, 2009	San Jose	United States	HP Pavilion at San Jose
July 14, 2009	West Valley City	United States	E Center
July 16, 2009	Los Angeles	United States	Staples Center
July 17, 2009	Ontario	United States	Citizens Business Bank Arena
July 18, 2009	San Diego	United States	San Diego Sports Arena
July 20, 2009	Glendale	United States	Jobing.com Arena
July 23, 2009	Dallas	United States	American Airlines Center
July 24, 2009	Tulsa	United States	BOK Center
July 25, 2009	North Little Rock	United States	Verizon Arena
July 26, 2009	Memphis	United States	FedExForum
July 28, 2009	Tampa	United States	St. Pete Times Forum
July 29, 2009	Sunrise	United States	BankAtlantic Center
July 31, 2009	Duluth	United States	Arena at Gwinnett Center
August 1, 2009	Charlotte	United States	Time Warner Cable Arena
August 2, 2009	Greensboro	United States	Greensboro Coliseum
August 4, 2009	Washington, D.C.	United States	Verizon Center
August 5, 2009	Baltimore	United States	1st Mariner Arena
August 7, 2009	Atlantic City	United States	Boardwalk Hall
August 8, 2009	Newark	United States	Prudential Center
August 9, 2009	Newark	United States	Prudential Center
August 11, 2009	Uniondale	United States	Nassau Coliseum
August 12, 2009	Uniondale	United States	Nassau Coliseum
August 14, 2009	Hamilton	Canada	Copps Coliseum
August 15, 2009	Rochester	United States	Blue Cross Arena
August 16, 2009	Hartford	United States	XL Center
August 18, 2009	Boston	United States	TD Garden
August 19, 2009	Albany	United States	Times Union Center
August 20, 2009	Philadelphia	United States	Wachovia Center
August 22, 2009	Pittsburgh	United States	Mellon Arena
August 23, 2009	Cleveland	United States	Wolstein Center
August 25, 2009	Columbus	United States	Schottenstein Center
August 26, 2009	Auburn Hills	United States	The Palace of Auburn Hills
August 28, 2009	Milwaukee	United States	Bradley Center
August 29, 2009	St. Louis	United States	Scottrade Center
August 30, 2009	Kansas City	United States	Sprint Center
September 1, 2009	Minneapolis	United States	Target Center
September 2, 2009	Rosemont	United States	Allstate Arena
September 4, 2009	Madison	United States	Alliant Energy Center
September 5, 2009	Indianapolis	United States	Conseco Fieldhouse
September 6, 2009	Grand Rapids	United States	Van Andel Arena
September 8, 2009	Reading	United States	Sovereign Center
September 9, 2009	Wilkes-Barre	United States	Wachovia Arena
September 10, 2009	Bridgeport	United States	Arena at Harbor Yard
September 12, 2009	Portland	United States	Cumberland County Civic Center
September 13, 2009	Providence	United States	Dunkin' Donuts Center
September 14, 2009	Syracuse	United States	War Memorial at Oncenter
September 15, 2009	Manchester	United States	Verizon Wireless Arena

== Nominations ==
The tour was nominated for a Teen Choice Award in the "Choice Music: Tour" category.

== Response ==
The eighth season tour equaled in its success to the seventh season tour. Despite a slightly lower number of total tickets sold at 484,434, it averaged slightly higher in attendance percentage capacity and yielded a higher gross of $30,139,328 million. It was ranked number 28 in Pollstar's year end list of North American tours.
