= Somebody Else's Fire (album) =

Studio album by Janie Fricke
- Released: June 1985
- Recorded: February 1985
- Studio: The Bennett House
- Genre: Traditional country
- Label: Columbia
- Producer: Bob Montgomery

Janie Fricke chronology
| The First Word in Memory (1984) | Somebody Else's Fire (1985) | The Very Best of Janie (1985) |

Singles from Somebody Else's Fire
- 1. "She's Single Again" Released: April 1985; 2. "Somebody Else's Fire" Released: August 1985; 3. "Easy to Please" Released: January 1986

Somebody Else's Fire is a studio album by American country music artist Janie Fricke. It was released in June 1985 via Columbia Records and was a collection of ten tracks. The disc was the tenth studio record released in Fricke's music career. The album reached the American country LP's chart in 1985 and spawned three singles. Its highest-charting single was the lead release titled "She's Single Again", which climbed to the number two spot in the United States and Canada. The album received a favorable review from AllMusic.

== Background and content ==
In the mid-1980s, Janie Fricke established an up-tempo country pop style that brought her a series of number one country singles like "He's a Heartache" and "Let's Stop Talkin' About It". This led to her winning the "Female Vocalist of the Year" accolade from the Country Music Association in 1982 and 1983. As the country genre was moving away from country-pop, Fricke transitioned towards a traditional country style. In an interview with the Chicago Tribune, she also explained her country pop was becoming formulaic: "You can only do so much of one thing--the real hard, fast, stomping beat."

Somebody Else's Fire was recorded with producer Bob Montgomery at the Bennett House studio in February 1985. It was Fricke's fourth album produced by Montgomery. A total of ten track comprised the project. Most of the project's songs were original recordings. Among its songs was the track "She's Single Again", which was also recorded by Reba McEntire for her 1985 album Have I Got a Deal for You.

== Release, reception and singles ==
Professional ratings
Review scores
| Source | Rating |
|---|---|
| Allmusic | 3/5 stars |

Somebody Else's Fire was released in June 1985 on Columbia Records. The disc marked Fricke's tenth studio album release in her career. It was distributed as a vinyl LP and a cassette with identical track listings. Both formats featured five recordings on either side of the discs. The album debuted on America's Billboard Top Country Albums chart in July 1985. It spent a total of 39 weeks on the chart and reached the number 21 spot. The record received a positive review from James Chrispell of AllMusic, who rated it three out of five stars. He highlighted several of its tracks including "Easy to Please" and "Party Shoes" and commented, "Somebody Else's Fire is a typically fine collection of tunes from one of the finest contemporary country singers of the '80s."

Three singles were spawned from Somebody Else's Fire. Its first release was "She's Single Again", which was issued by Columbia Records in April 1985. The song spent 22 weeks on the Billboard Hot Country Songs chart and peaked at number two by August 1985. In August 1985, the title track was spawned as the next single. It spent 23 weeks on the Billboard country chart peaked at number four. The final single spawned was the track "Easy to Please", which reached number five on the Billboard country chart after 22 weeks. On Canada's RPM Country chart, all three singles reached charting positions. "She's Single Again" was its highest-charting single in Canada, also reaching the number two position.

== Track listing ==
Side one (LP and cassette versions)
| No. | Title | Writer(s) | Length |
|---|---|---|---|
| 1. | "She's Single Again" | Charlie Craig; Peter McCann | 2:59 |
| 2. | "I Hurt All Over" | Bill Rice; Sharon Vaughn | 2:59 |
| 3. | "Somebody Else's Fire" | Pat Bunch; Mary Ann Kennedy; Pam Rose | 3:12 |
| 4. | "Don't Make Me a Liar Again" | Bunch; Kennedy; Rose | 3:08 |
| 5. | "Easy to Please" | Kye Fleming; Kent Robbins | 2:45 |

Side two (LP and cassette versions)
| No. | Title | Writer(s) | Length |
|---|---|---|---|
| 1. | "He Ain't You" | B. McGuire; E. Moore | 3:02 |
| 2. | "My Heart's Hearin' Footsteps" | Wood Newton; Michael Noble | 3:00 |
| 3. | "What a Heart Won't Do" | Randy Albright; John Greenebaum | 2:58 |
| 4. | "Party Shoes" | Kenny O'Dell | 2:29 |
| 5. | "The Only Thing You Took Away" | David Stephenson | 2:47 |

== Personnel ==
All credits are adapted from the liner notes of Somebody Else's Fire.

Musical personnel

- Janie Fricke - lead and backing vocals
- Larry Byrom – acoustic guitar, electric guitar
- Kenny Mims – electric guitar
- Thomas Hannum – steel guitar
- Mary Ann Kennedy – backing vocals
- The Nashville String Machine – strings
- Ron Oates – keyboards
- Pam Rose – backing vocals
- James Stroud – drums
- William C. Warren – backing vocals
- Tony Wiggins – backing vocals
- Benny Wilson – backing vocals
- Bob Wray – bass

Technical personnel

- Don Cobb – second engineer
- Gene Eichelberger – first engineer
- Bob Montgomery – producer
- Ron Oates – arrangements
- Danny Purcell – mastering

== Charts ==
Weekly chart performance for Somebody Else's Fire
| Chart (1985) | Peak position |
|---|---|
| US Top Country Albums (Billboard) | 21 |

== Release history ==
| Region | Date | Format | Label | Ref. |
|---|---|---|---|---|
| Australia | June 1985 | Vinyl | CBS Records International | |
| North America | June 1985 | Vinyl | Columbia Records | |
| North America | June 1985 | Cassette | Columbia Records | |
