= American Idol season 8 =

Season of television series

American Idol
- Season 8
- Hosted by: Ryan Seacrest
- Judges: Paula Abdul; Simon Cowell; Kara DioGuardi; Randy Jackson
- Winner: Kris Allen
- Runner-up: Adam Lambert
- Finals venue: Nokia Theatre L.A. Live

Release
- Original network: Fox
- Original release: January 13 – May 20, 2009

Season chronology
- ← Previous; Season 7 Next → Season 9

The eighth season of American Idol premiered on Tuesday, January 13, 2009, and concluded on May 20, 2009. Simon Cowell, Paula Abdul, and Randy Jackson returned as judges, while Ryan Seacrest returned as host. This season introduced Kara DioGuardi as a permanent fourth judge. This season was also Paula Abdul's last season as a judge. Kris Allen was announced the winner of the competition on May 20, 2009, defeating runner-up Adam Lambert after nearly 100 million votes were cast.

The eighth season saw numerous changes to the format of the show. There were 36 semifinalists instead of 24, and thirteen finalists instead of twelve: nine contestants chosen by the public and four by the judges in a Wild Card round. Another addition was the "judges' save," which allowed the judges to veto one elimination during the competition, and was used to veto Matt Giraud's elimination.

Multiple contestants from this season were signed to record deals including Kris Allen, Adam Lambert, Danny Gokey, Allison Iraheta, Lil Rounds, Anoop Desai, and Michael Sarver.

== Changes from previous seasons ==
Several changes were planned for the eighth season. Fox Entertainment president Kevin Reilly said that Idol would feature fewer "William Hung-like" contestants and "funny auditions," and would quickly move its focus to the potential singers during the earlier stages of the competition, thus moving the season at a faster pace. Mike Darnell, president of Fox's alternative programming, said the contestants would be more emotional and that viewers would learn more about them and their pasts than they had in the previous season. Songwriter and record producer Kara DioGuardi was added as a permanent fourth judge. She had previously collaborated with Celine Dion, Hilary Duff, Britney Spears, Enrique Iglesias, Leona Lewis and Christina Aguilera, and produced several Top 40 hits. As a songwriter, she had already worked with several American Idol alumni and winners including Kelly Clarkson, Carrie Underwood, David Archuleta, and David Cook. Meanwhile, Ken Warwick became the new executive producer, as Nigel Lythgoe had left the show to focus on So You Think You Can Dance and his new show with Simon Fuller, Superstars of Dance. Idol Gives Back was canceled for the eighth season, as the Great Recession left Idol officials uncomfortable about asking financially struggling viewers to donate. The semifinals had the biggest change as the Wild Card round returned for the first time since the third season. After voters picked three finalists from each of three groups of 12 semifinalists, the judges selected eight of the previously eliminated 27 semifinalists to return and perform on the March 5 show. They were judged by the panel, instead of a vote by the viewers, with four advancing to the finals. Although the finals had been billed from the beginning of the season as a set of 12 contestants, the judges announced at the last minute that they would be advancing a fourth Wild Card contestant, resulting in 13 singers advancing to the finals.

=== Judges' save ===
Another change to the Idol format was the judges' save, an element previously used in France's Nouvelle Star. The judges were given the power to veto one elimination in the finals for that particular week. The veto could only be used until the top 5. The next week, two contestants would be eliminated if the judges' save were used. The save could only be used once per season and must be a unanimous decision. The new format change was revealed on March 11, 2009. The first recipient of the judges' save was Matt Giraud.

== Regional auditions ==
Auditions began July 17, 2008, and were held in the following cities:

American Idol (season 8) – regional auditions
City	Preliminary date	Preliminary venue	Filming date(s)	Filming venue	Golden tickets
San Francisco, California	July 17, 2008	Cow Palace	September 13, 2008	Westin St. Francis	12
Louisville, Kentucky	July 21, 2008	Freedom Hall	September 7–8, 2008	Churchill Downs	19
Phoenix, Arizona	July 25, 2008	Jobing.com Arena	September 2008	The Boulders	27
Salt Lake City, Utah	July 29, 2008	EnergySolutions Arena	September 18–19, 2008	Wells Fargo Center	13
San Juan, Puerto Rico	August 2, 2008	Coliseo de Puerto Rico	September 2008	Conrad San Juan Condado Plaza	9
Kansas City, Missouri	August 8, 2008	Kemper Arena	October 5, 2008	Firestone Building	27
Jacksonville, Florida	August 13, 2008	Jacksonville Veterans Memorial Arena	September 3, 2008	Amelia Island Plantation	16
New York City, New York	August 19, 2008	Izod Center	August 26, 2008	Chelsea Piers	26
Total number of tickets to Hollywood					149

Contestants were required to be between the ages of 16 and 28 on July 15, 2008, and eligible to work in the United States. Those ineligible included former contestants who had previously reached the semifinals of the first through third seasons, or the last phase of the Hollywood round of the fourth through seventh seasons, those holding recording or management contracts, or those who were not U.S. citizens or permanent residents.

== Hollywood week ==
The Hollywood round moved from the Orpheum Theatre to the Kodak Theatre, which had previously been used for the finales in the first and third through sixth seasons.

In the first round, the 147 contestants each sang a short solo a cappella performance of any song. The next round had the remaining 107 contestants performing in groups of three or four. The 72 contestants who survived that round performed one more solo song, this time accompanied by a band, before being narrowed down to 54. The final 54 then went to the "judges' mansion" in Los Angeles for the final results, and the top 36 were announced. Some contestants had a sing-off to determine who would enter the top 36.

== Semifinals ==
The 36 contestants performed in three groups of twelve and sang songs that were Billboard Hot 100 hits. In each group, three people advanced to the next round via a public vote. After nine contestants had been chosen, the judges selected eight of the remaining 27 semifinalists to compete in the Wild Card round. Following another performance by each contender, each judge selected one contestant to advance to the final group of 13.

Color key:

This contestant was chosen by the public and moved on to the live shows.
This contestant was not chosen by the public and was left to perform again for the judges in the Wild Card round.
This contestant was eliminated.

=== Group 1 ===
Contestants are listed in the order they performed.

Contestant	Song	Result
Jackie Tohn	"A Little Less Conversation"	Eliminated
Ricky Braddy	"A Song for You"	Wild Card
Alexis Grace	"I Never Loved a Man (The Way I Love You)"	Advanced
Brent Keith	"Hicktown"	Eliminated
Stevie Wright	"You Belong with Me"	Eliminated
Anoop Desai	"Angel of Mine"	Wild Card
Casey Carlson	"Every Little Thing She Does Is Magic"	Eliminated
Michael Sarver	"I Don't Want to Be"	Advanced
Ann Marie Boskovich	"(You Make Me Feel Like) A Natural Woman"	Eliminated
Stephen Fowler	"Rock with You"	Eliminated
Tatiana Del Toro	"Saving All My Love for You"	Wild Card
Danny Gokey	"Hero"	Advanced

Non-competition performance
Performers	Song
Group 1	"I'm Yours"
Carly Smithson & Michael Johns	"The Letter"

=== Group 2 ===
Due to President Obama's 2009 speech to a joint session of Congress that took place on Tuesday, February 24, the performance show was moved to Wednesday, February 25, and the results show to Thursday, February 26. Contestants are listed in the order they performed.

Contestant	Song	Result
Jasmine Murray	"Love Song"	Wild Card
Matt Giraud	"Viva la Vida"	Wild Card
Jeanine Vailes	"This Love"	Eliminated
Nick Mitchell	"And I Am Telling You I'm Not Going"	Eliminated
Allison Iraheta	"Alone"	Advanced
Kris Allen	"Man in the Mirror"	Advanced
Megan Joy	"Put Your Records On"	Wild Card
Matt Breitzke	"If You Could Only See"	Eliminated
Jesse Langseth	"Bette Davis Eyes"	Wild Card
Kai Kalama	"What Becomes of the Brokenhearted"	Eliminated
Mishavonna Henson	"Drops of Jupiter (Tell Me)"	Eliminated
Adam Lambert	"(I Can't Get No) Satisfaction"	Advanced

Non-competition performance
Performers	Song
Group 2	"Closer"
Brooke White	"Hold Up My Heart"

=== Group 3 ===
Contestants are listed in the order they performed.

Contestant	Song	Result
Von Smith	"You're All I Need to Get By"	Wild Card
Taylor Vaifanua	"If I Ain't Got You"	Eliminated
Alex Wagner-Trugman	"I Guess That's Why They Call It the Blues"	Eliminated
Arianna Afsar	"The Winner Takes It All"	Eliminated
Ju'Not Joyner	"Hey There Delilah"	Eliminated
Kristen McNamara	"Give Me One Reason"	Eliminated
Nathaniel Marshall	"I'd Do Anything for Love (But I Won't Do That)"	Eliminated
Felicia Barton (Note: Felicia Barton was initially eliminated prior to the semifinals. However, after Joanna Pacitti was disqualified, Felicia was invited back into the competition.)	"No One"	Eliminated
Scott MacIntyre	"Mandolin Rain"	Advanced
Kendall Beard	"This One's for the Girls"	Eliminated
Jorge Núñez	"Don't Let the Sun Go Down on Me"	Advanced
Lil Rounds	"Be Without You"	Advanced

Non-competition performance
Performers	Song
Group 3	"Hot n Cold"

=== Wild Card round ===
Contestants are listed in the order they performed.

Contestant	Song	Result
Jesse Langseth	"Tell Me Something Good"	Eliminated
Matt Giraud	"Who's Lovin' You"	Advanced
Megan Joy	"Black Horse and the Cherry Tree"	Advanced
Von Smith	"Sorry Seems to Be the Hardest Word"	Eliminated
Jasmine Murray	"Reflection"	Advanced
Ricky Braddy	"Superstition"	Eliminated
Tatiana Del Toro	"Saving All My Love for You"	Eliminated
Anoop Desai	"My Prerogative"	Advanced

== Top 13 contestants ==
Eleven of the top thirteen finalists

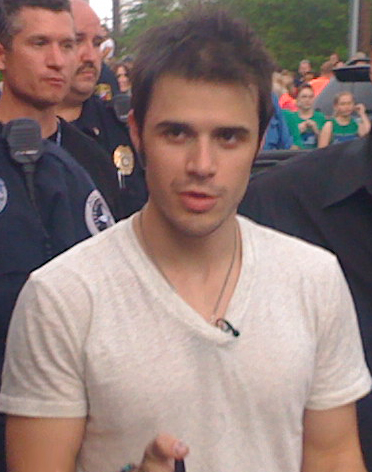
Kris Allen

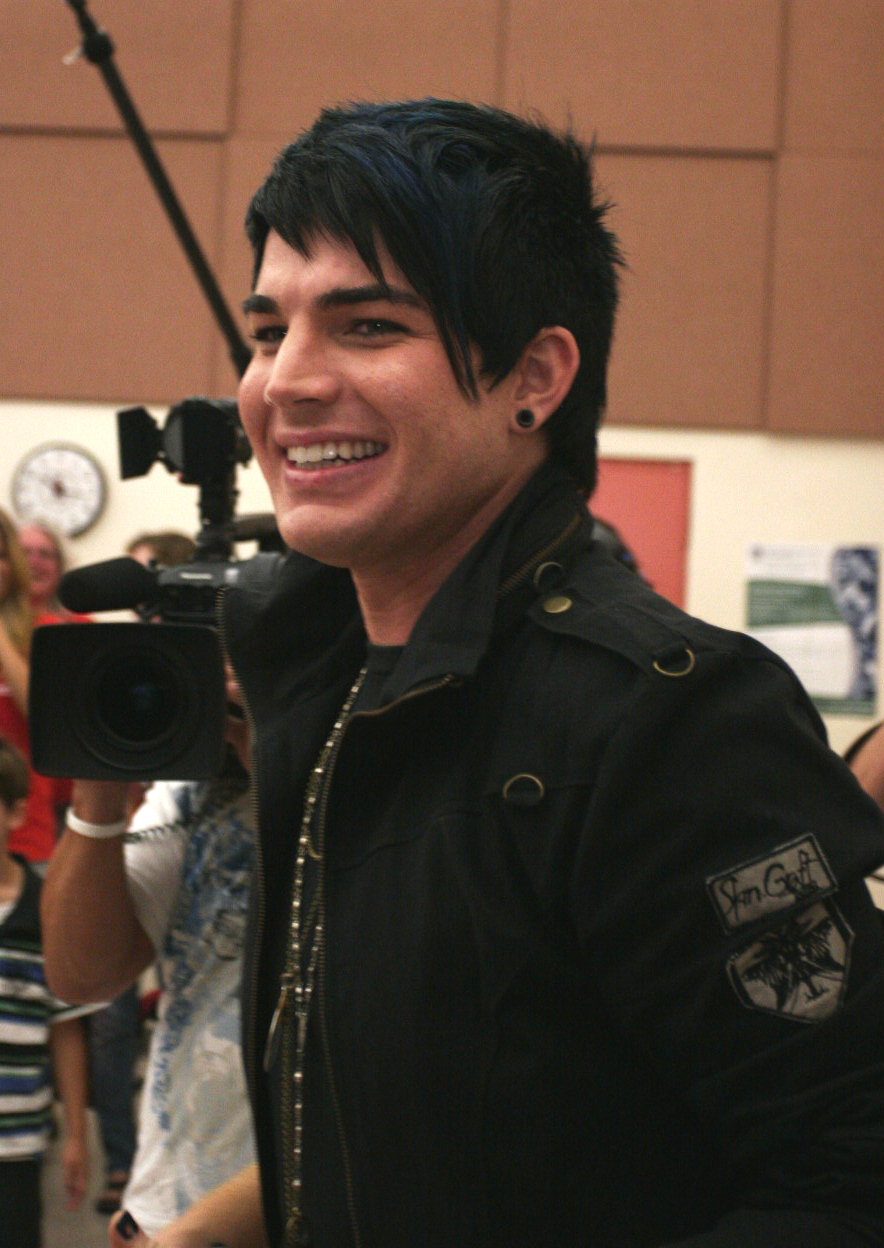
Adam Lambert

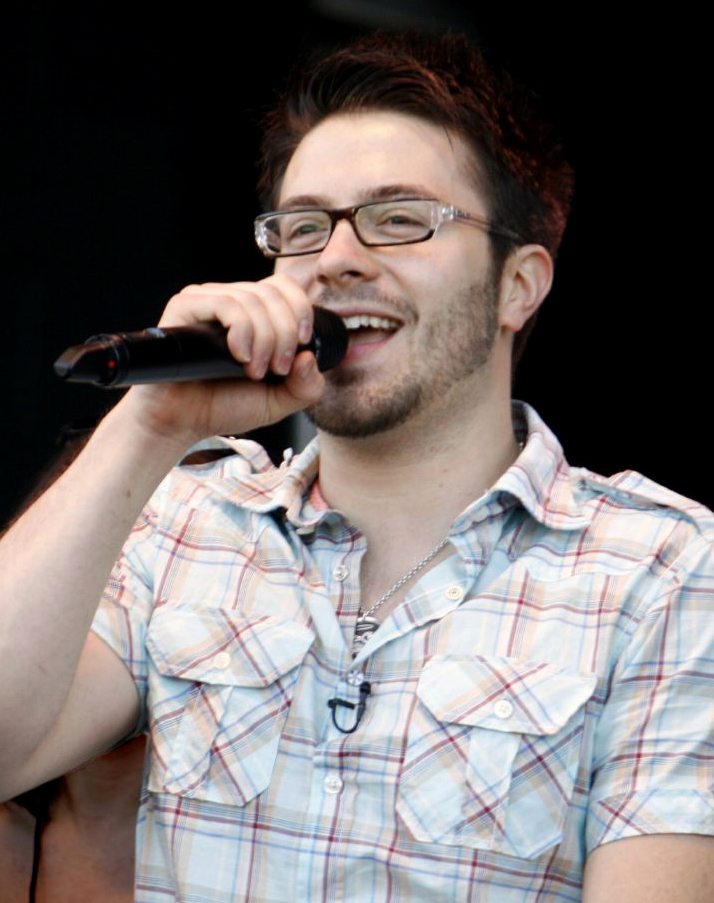
Danny Gokey

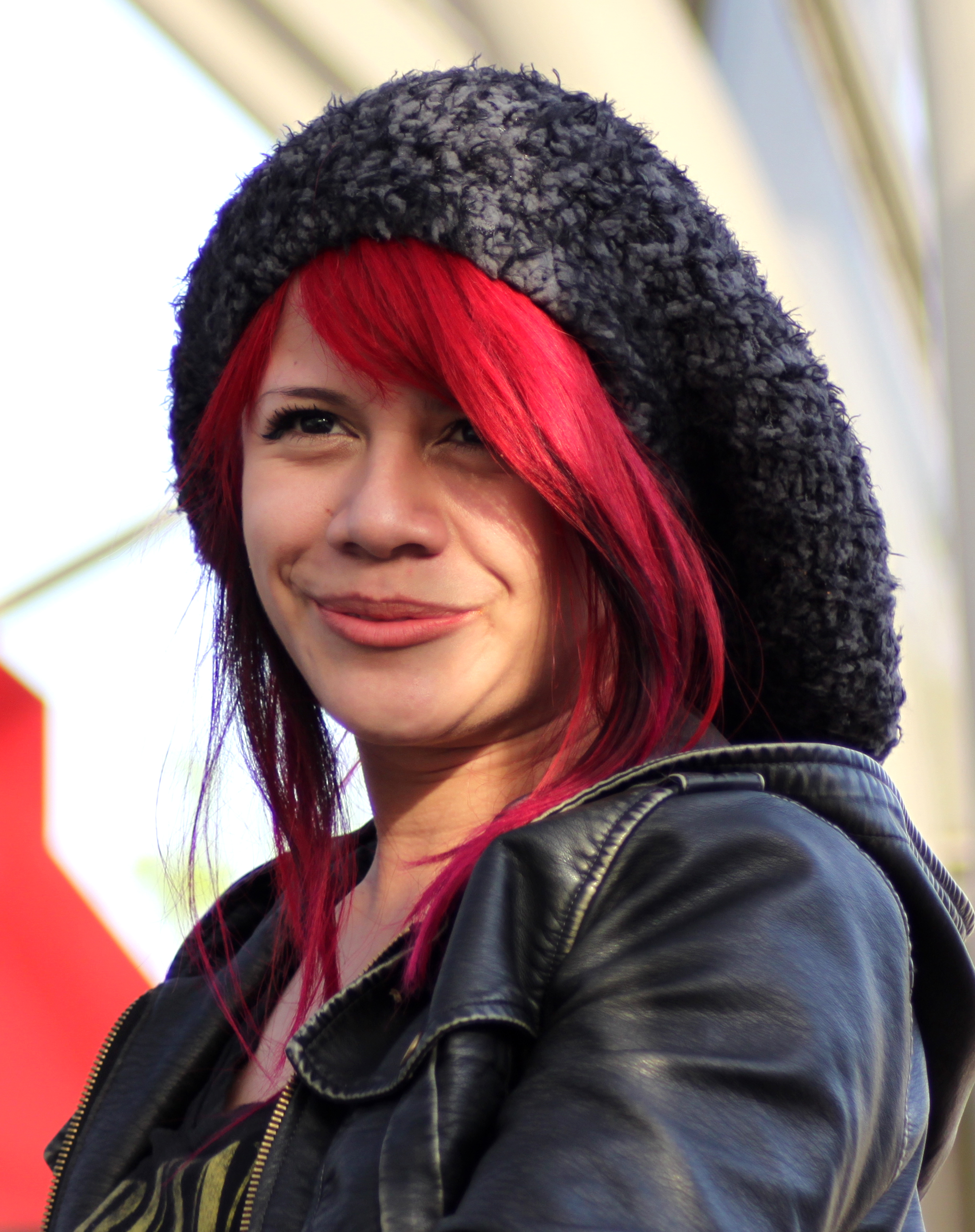
Allison Iraheta

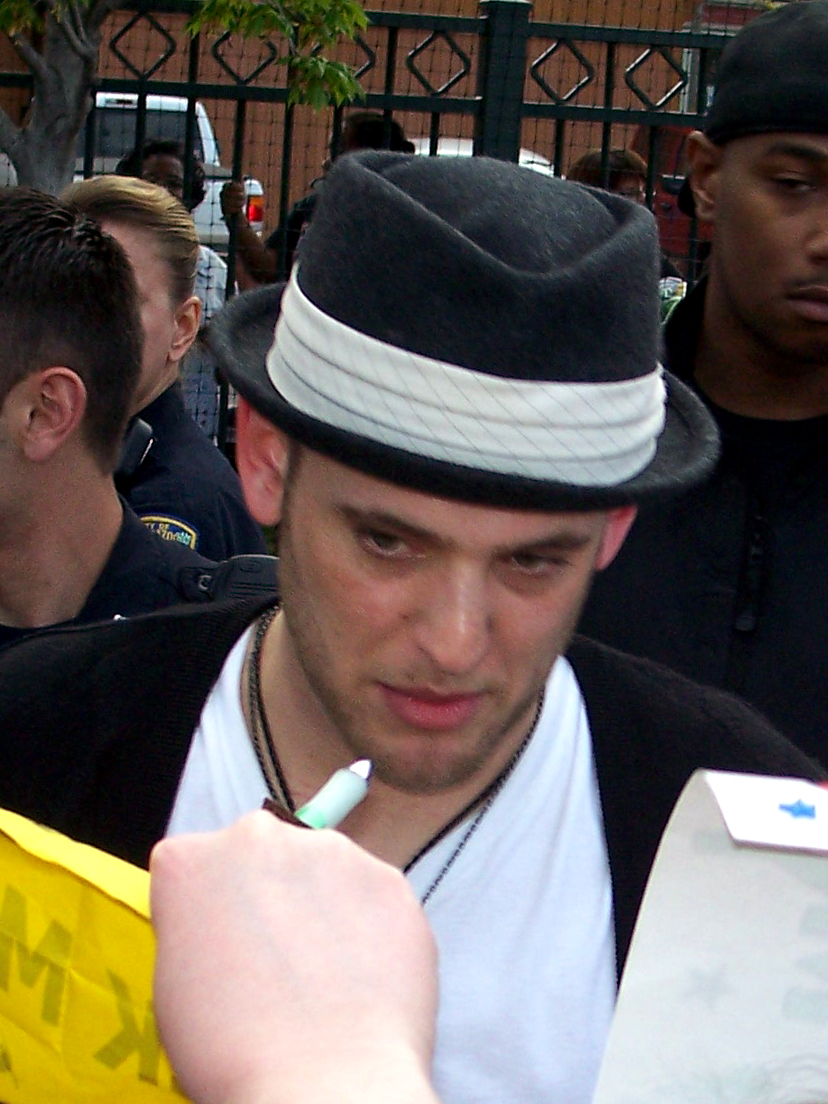
Matt Giraud

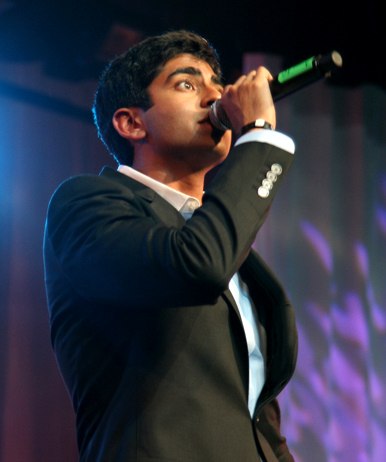
Anoop Desai

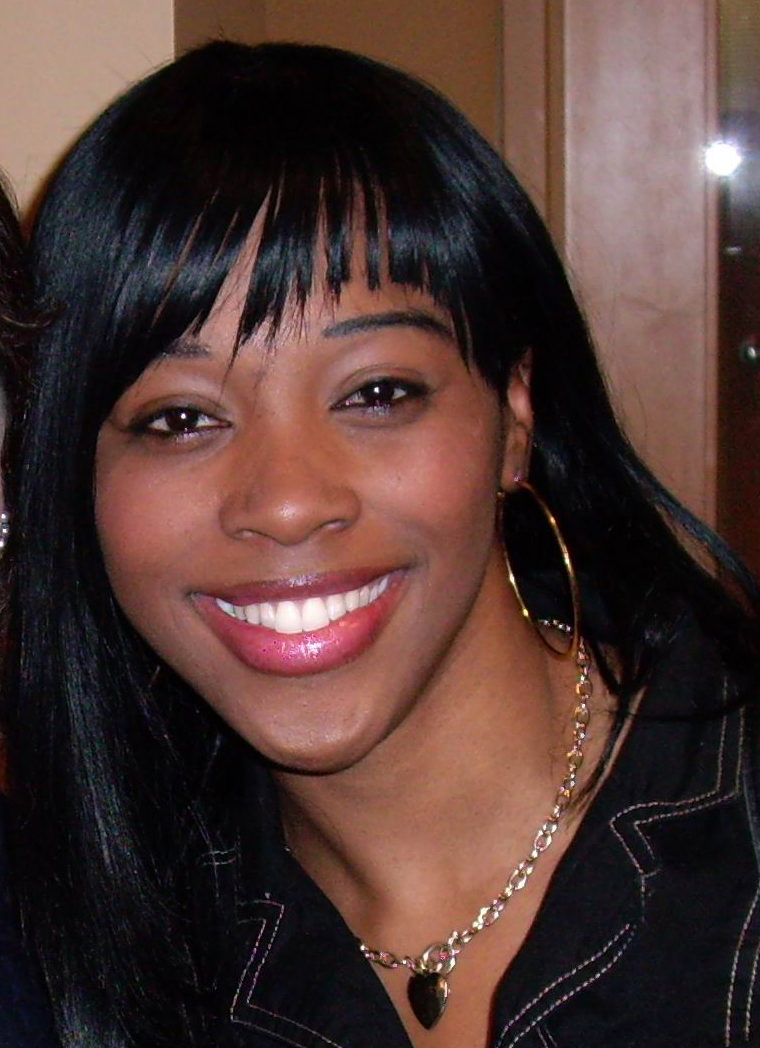
Lil Rounds

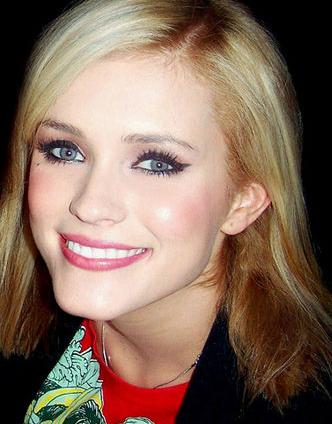
Megan Joy

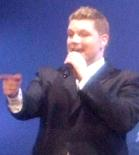
Michael Sarver

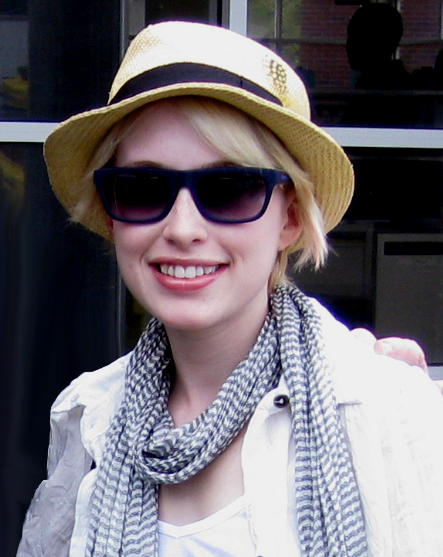
Alexis Grace

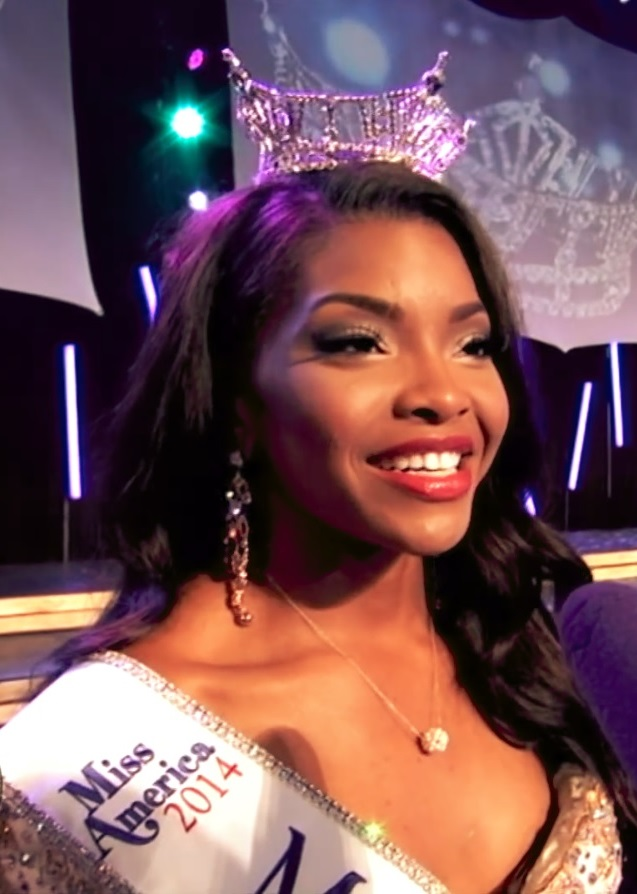
Jasmine Murray

- Kris Allen (born June 21, 1985, in Jacksonville, Arkansas; 23 years old at the time of the show) was from Conway, Arkansas, and auditioned in Louisville with Leon Russell's "A Song for You."
- Adam Lambert (born January 29, 1982, in Indianapolis, Indiana; 26 years old at the time of the show) was from San Diego, California, and auditioned in San Francisco with Queen's "Bohemian Rhapsody."
- Danny Gokey (born April 24, 1980; 28 years old at the time of the show) was from Milwaukee, Wisconsin, and auditioned in Kansas City.
- Allison Iraheta (born April 27, 1992, in Glendale, California; 16 years old at the time of the show) was from Los Angeles, and auditioned in San Francisco.
- Matt Giraud (born May 11, 1985, in Dearborn, Michigan; 23 years old at the time of the show) was from Kalamazoo, Michigan, and auditioned in Louisville with Gavin DeGraw's "I Don't Want to Be."
- Anoop Desai (born December 20, 1986, in Cary, North Carolina; 22 years old at the time of the show) was from Chapel Hill, North Carolina, and auditioned in Kansas City.
- Lil Rounds (born October 20, 1984; 24 years old at the time of the show) was from Memphis, Tennessee, and auditioned in Kansas City with Stevie Wonder's "All I Do." Her performance of Dolly Parton's "I Will Always Love You" in Hollywood impressed the judges.
- Scott MacIntyre (born June 22, 1985; 23 years old at the time of the show) was from Scottsdale, Arizona, and auditioned in Phoenix. He was the first legally blind person to audition for American Idol.
- Megan Joy (born September 18, 1985; 23 years old at the time of the show) was from Sandy, Utah, and auditioned in Salt Lake City with Helen Morgan's "Can't Help Lovin' Dat Man."
- Michael Sarver (born March 28, 1981, in Sulphur, Louisiana; 27 years old at the time of the show) was from Jasper, Texas, and auditioned in Phoenix with Boyz II Men's "Thank You."
- Alexis Grace (born August 14, 1987; 21 years old at the time of the show) was from Memphis, Tennessee, and auditioned in Louisville with Aretha Franklin's "Dr Feelgood." She performed Aretha Franklin's "Do Right Woman, Do Right Man" and Carrie Underwood's "Before He Cheats" in Hollywood.
- Jorge Núñez (born October 1, 1987, in Cidra, Puerto Rico; 21 years old at the time of the show) was from Carolina, Puerto Rico, and auditioned in San Juan. For his audition, he sang "My Way" in Spanish and Louis Armstrong's "What a Wonderful World" in English. He performed Jon Secada's "Angel" in Hollywood.
- Jasmine Murray (born March 14, 1992, in Columbus, Mississippi; 16 years old at the time of the show) was from Starkville, Mississippi, and auditioned in Jacksonville.

== Finals ==
There were eleven weeks of finals with thirteen contestants competing. At least one contestant was eliminated every week based on the public's votes, although the judges could veto one elimination through the use of the "judges' save."

Color key:

This contestant was saved by America's vote.
This contestant was in the bottom two or three, but was saved by America's vote.
This contestant was saved from elimination by the judges.
This contestant was eliminated.
This contestant won American Idol.
This contestant was the runner-up.

=== Top 13 – Michael Jackson ===
Contestants performed one song each from the Michael Jackson discography, and are listed in the order they performed. Two contestants were eliminated.

This episode re-aired on June 29, 2009, in a tribute to Michael Jackson after his death. Simon Cowell had hoped that Jackson would perform on the show as part of his comeback tour.

Contestant	Michael Jackson song	Result
Lil Rounds	"The Way You Make Me Feel"	Safe
Scott MacIntyre	"Keep the Faith"	Safe
Danny Gokey	"P.Y.T. (Pretty Young Thing)"	Safe
Michael Sarver	"You Are Not Alone"	Safe
Jasmine Murray	"I'll Be There"	Eliminated
Kris Allen	"Remember the Time"	Safe
Allison Iraheta	"Give In to Me"	Safe
Anoop Desai	"Beat It"	Safe
Jorge Núñez	"Never Can Say Goodbye"	Eliminated
Megan Joy	"Rockin' Robin"	Safe
Adam Lambert	"Black or White"	Safe
Matt Giraud	"Human Nature"	Safe
Alexis Grace	"Dirty Diana"	Safe

Non-competition performance
Performers	Song
Top 13	"I Want You Back" "ABC"
Kanye West	"Heartless"
Kelly Clarkson	"My Life Would Suck Without You"

=== Top 11 – Grand Ole Opry ===
Country singer Randy Travis served as a guest mentor this week. Contestants each performed one song from the Grand Ole Opry, and are listed in the order they performed.

Contestant	Country song	Result
Michael Sarver	"Ain't Goin' Down ('Til the Sun Comes Up)"	Bottom two
Allison Iraheta	"Blame It on Your Heart"	Bottom three
Kris Allen	"Make You Feel My Love"	Safe
Lil Rounds	"Independence Day"	Safe
Adam Lambert	"Ring of Fire"	Safe
Scott MacIntyre	"Wild Angels"	Safe
Alexis Grace	"Jolene"	Eliminated
Danny Gokey	"Jesus, Take the Wheel"	Safe
Anoop Desai	"Always on My Mind"	Safe
Megan Joy	"Walkin' After Midnight"	Safe
Matt Giraud	"So Small"	Safe

Non-competition performance
Performers	Song
Top 11	"T-R-O-U-B-L-E"
Brad Paisley	"Then"
Carrie Underwood & Randy Travis	"I Told You So"

=== Top 10 – Motown ===
Smokey Robinson served as a guest mentor this week. Contestants are listed in the order they performed.

The performance show aired on Wednesday, March 25, and the results show on Thursday, March 26, due to a White House press conference that aired on Tuesday, March 24.

Contestant	Motown song	Result
Matt Giraud	"Let's Get It On"	Bottom two
Kris Allen	"How Sweet It Is (To Be Loved by You)"	Safe
Scott MacIntyre	"You Can't Hurry Love"	Bottom three
Megan Joy	"For Once in My Life"	Safe
Anoop Desai	"Ooo Baby Baby"	Safe
Michael Sarver	"Ain't Too Proud to Beg"	Eliminated
Lil Rounds	"Heat Wave"	Safe
Adam Lambert	"The Tracks of My Tears"	Safe
Danny Gokey	"Get Ready"	Safe
Allison Iraheta	"Papa Was a Rollin' Stone"	Safe

Non-competition performance
Performers	Song
Top 10	Motown medley: "You Keep Me Hangin' On" "You're All I Need to Get By" "Ain't No Mountain High Enough"
Ruben Studdard	"Together"
Smokey Robinson & Joss Stone	"You're the One for Me"
Stevie Wonder	"My Chérie Amour" "Superstition" "Overjoyed" "All About the Love Again"

=== Top 9 – Popular iTunes downloads ===
Contestants are listed in the order they performed.

Contestant	Song	Result
Anoop Desai	"Caught Up"	Bottom two
Megan Joy	"Turn Your Lights Down Low"	Eliminated
Danny Gokey	"What Hurts the Most"	Safe
Allison Iraheta	"Don't Speak"	Bottom three
Scott MacIntyre	"Just the Way You Are"	Safe
Matt Giraud	"You Found Me"	Safe
Lil Rounds	"I Surrender"	Safe
Adam Lambert	"Play That Funky Music"	Safe
Kris Allen	"Ain't No Sunshine"	Safe

Non-competition performance
Performers	Song
Top 9	"Don't Stop Believin'"
David Cook	"Come Back to Me"
Lady Gaga	"Poker Face"

=== Top 8 – Contestants' birth year ===
Contestants each performed one song from the year they were born, and are listed in the order they performed.

Contestant	Song	Birth year	Result
Danny Gokey	"Stand By Me"	1980	Safe
Kris Allen	"All She Wants to Do Is Dance"	1985	Safe
Lil Rounds	"What's Love Got to Do with It"	1984	Bottom three
Anoop Desai	"True Colors"	1986	Bottom two
Scott MacIntyre	"The Search Is Over"	1985	Eliminated
Allison Iraheta	"I Can't Make You Love Me"	1991	Safe
Matt Giraud	"Part-Time Lover"	1985	Safe
Adam Lambert	"Mad World"	1982	Safe

Non-competition performance
Performers	Song
Top 8	"Can't Get You Out of My Head"
Frankie Avalon	"Venus"
Flo Rida & Wynter Gordon	"Right Round"
Kellie Pickler	"Best Days of Your Life"

=== Top 7 (April 15th) – Movie soundtracks ===
Quentin Tarantino served as a guest mentor this week. Contestants chose songs featured in movies, and are listed in the order they performed. The judges chose to use their "judges' save" when Matt Giraud was announced as the performer to be eliminated. As a result, no one was eliminated this week.

Contestant	Song	Film	Result
Allison Iraheta	"I Don't Want to Miss a Thing"	Armageddon	Safe
Anoop Desai	"(Everything I Do) I Do It for You"	Robin Hood: Prince of Thieves	Bottom three
Adam Lambert	"Born to Be Wild"	Easy Rider	Safe
Matt Giraud	"Have You Ever Really Loved a Woman?"	Don Juan DeMarco	Saved by the judges
Danny Gokey	"Endless Love"	Endless Love	Safe
Kris Allen	"Falling Slowly"	Once	Safe
Lil Rounds	"The Rose"	The Rose	Bottom two

Non-competition performance
Performers	Song
Top 7	"Maniac"
Jennifer Hudson	"If This Isn't Love"
Miley Cyrus	"The Climb"

=== Top 7 (April 21st) – Disco ===
Contestants are listed in the order they performed. Two contestants were eliminated.

Contestant	Disco song	Result
Lil Rounds	"I'm Every Woman"	Eliminated
Kris Allen	"She Works Hard for the Money"	Safe
Danny Gokey	"September"	Safe
Allison Iraheta	"Hot Stuff"	Bottom three
Adam Lambert	"If I Can't Have You"	Safe
Matt Giraud	"Stayin' Alive"	Safe
Anoop Desai	"Dim All the Lights"	Eliminated

Non-competition performance
Performers	Song
Top 7	"Shake Your Body (Down to the Ground)"
David Archuleta	"Touch My Hand"
Freda Payne, Thelma Houston, and KC	Band of Gold" "Don't Leave Me This Way" "Get Down Tonight"

=== Top 5 – Rat Pack ===
Jamie Foxx served as a guest mentor this week. Contestants performed one song each from the Rat Pack era, and are listed in the order they performed.

Contestant	Rat Pack song	Result
Kris Allen	"The Way You Look Tonight"	Bottom three
Allison Iraheta	"Someone to Watch Over Me"	Safe
Matt Giraud	"My Funny Valentine"	Eliminated
Danny Gokey	"Come Rain or Come Shine"	Safe
Adam Lambert	"Feeling Good"	Bottom two

Non-competition performance
Performers	Song
Top 5	"It Don't Mean a Thing (If It Ain't Got That Swing)" "I Got Rhythm"
Natalie Cole	"Something's Gotta Give"
Taylor Hicks	"Seven Mile Breakdown"
Jamie Foxx	"Blame It"

=== Top 4 – Rock music ===
Slash served as a guest mentor this week. Each contestant performed two songs: one solo and one duet with a fellow contestant. Contestants are listed in the order they performed.

Contestant	Order	Rock song	Result
Adam Lambert	1	"Whole Lotta Love"	Safe
Allison Iraheta	2	"Cry Baby"	Eliminated
Kris Allen	4	"Come Together"	Safe
Danny Gokey	5	"Dream On"	Safe
Kris Allen & Danny Gokey	3	"Renegade"	
Allison Iraheta & Adam Lambert	6	"Slow Ride"	

Non-competition performance
Performers	Song
Top 4	"School's Out"
Paula Abdul	"I'm Just Here for the Music"
No Doubt	"Just a Girl"
Daughtry	"No Surprise"

=== Top 3 ===
Each contestant performed two songs: one chosen by the judges and one chosen by the contestant. Contestants are listed in the order they performed.

Contestant	Order	Song	Result
Danny Gokey	1	"Dance Little Sister" (Note: Song chosen by Paula Abdul.)	Eliminated
Danny Gokey	4	"You Are So Beautiful"	Eliminated
Kris Allen	2	"Apologize" (Note: Song chosen by Randy Jackson and Kara DioGuardi.)	Safe
Kris Allen	5	"Heartless"	Safe
Adam Lambert	3	"One" (Note: Song chosen by Simon Cowell.)	Safe
Adam Lambert	6	"Cryin'"	Safe

Non-competition performance
Performers	Song
Noah Mushimiyimana	"I'm the World's Greatest"
Jordin Sparks	"Battlefield"
Katy Perry	"Waking Up in Vegas"

=== Top 2 – Finale ===
Each contestant performed three songs, one of which was chosen by producer Simon Fuller, and are listed in the order they performed. Kris Allen won the coin toss the week prior and chose to perform second.

Contestant	Order	Song	Result
Adam Lambert	1	"Mad World"	Runner-up
Adam Lambert	3	"A Change Is Gonna Come" (Note: Song chosen by Simon Fuller.)	Runner-up
Adam Lambert	5	"No Boundaries"	Runner-up
Kris Allen	2	"Ain't No Sunshine"	Winner
Kris Allen	4	"What's Going On"	Winner
Kris Allen	6	"No Boundaries"	Winner

Non-competition performance
Performers	Song
Carrie Underwood	"Home Sweet Home"
Top 13	"So What"
David Cook	"Permanent"
Lil Rounds with Queen Latifah	"Cue the Rain"
Anoop Desai and Alexis Grace with Jason Mraz	"I'm Yours"
Kris Allen with Keith Urban	"Kiss a Girl"
Allison Iraheta, Lil Rounds, Megan Joy, Alexis Grace and Jasmine Murray with Fergie	"Glamorous" "Big Girls Don't Cry"
The Black Eyed Peas	"Boom Boom Pow"
Allison Iraheta with Cyndi Lauper	"Time After Time"
Danny Gokey with Lionel Richie	"Hello" "Just Go" "All Night Long"
Adam Lambert	"Beth"
Adam Lambert with Kiss	"Detroit Rock City" "Rock and Roll All Nite"
Matt Giraud with Carlos Santana	"Black Magic Woman"
Top 13 with Carlos Santana	"Smooth"
Megan Joy & Michael Sarver with Steve Martin	"Pretty Flowers"
Kris Allen, Adam Lambert, Danny Gokey, Matt Giraud, Anoop Desai, Scott MacIntyre, Michael Sarver & Jorge Nunez	"Da Ya Think I'm Sexy?"
Rod Stewart	"Maggie May"
Kris Allen & Adam Lambert with Queen (band)	"We Are the Champions"
Kris Allen	"No Boundaries"

== Elimination chart ==
Color key:

Winner
Runner-up
Did not perform
Saved by the public
Saved by the judges
Bottom two or three
Eliminated

American Idol (season 8) - Eliminations
Contestant	Pl.	Semifinals			Wild Card	Top 13	Top 11	Top 10	Top 9	Top 8	Top 7 (Note: Because the judges used their one "judges' save" to save Matt Giraud, no one was eliminated. The following week was a Double Elimination.)		Top 5	Top 4	Top 3	Finale
Contestant	Pl.	2/18	2/26 (Note: Due to President Obama's 2009 speech to a joint session of Congress that took place on Tuesday, February 24, this week's performance show was moved to Wednesday, February 25, and the results show to Thursday, February 26.)	3/4	3/5	3/11	3/18	3/26 (Note: Due to a White House press conference, this week's performance show aired on Wednesday, March 25, and the results show on Thursday, March 26.)	4/1	4/8	4/15	4/22	4/29	5/6	5/13	5/20
Kris Allen	1	N/A	Safe	N/A	N/A	Safe	Safe	Safe	Safe	Safe	Safe	Safe	Bottom three	Safe	Safe	Winner
Adam Lambert	2	N/A	Safe	N/A	N/A	Safe	Safe	Safe	Safe	Safe	Safe	Safe	Bottom two	Safe	Safe	Runner-up
Danny Gokey	3	Safe	N/A	N/A	N/A	Safe	Safe	Safe	Safe	Safe	Safe	Safe	Safe	Safe	Eliminated	
Allison Iraheta	4	N/A	Safe	N/A	N/A	Safe	Bottom three	Safe	Bottom three	Safe	Safe	Bottom three	Safe	Eliminated		
Matt Giraud	5	N/A	Wild Card	N/A	Saved	Safe	Safe	Bottom two	Safe	Safe	Saved	Safe	Eliminated			
Anoop Desai	6	Wild Card	N/A	N/A	Saved	Safe	Safe	Safe	Bottom two	Bottom two	Bottom three	Eliminated				
Lil Rounds	6	N/A	N/A	Safe	N/A	Safe	Safe	Safe	Safe	Bottom three	Bottom two	Eliminated				
Scott MacIntyre	8	N/A	N/A	Safe	N/A	Safe	Safe	Bottom three	Safe	Eliminated						
Megan Joy	9	N/A	Wild Card	N/A	Saved	Safe	Safe	Safe	Eliminated							
Michael Sarver	10	Safe	N/A	N/A	N/A	Safe	Bottom two	Eliminated								
Alexis Grace	11	Safe	N/A	N/A	N/A	Safe	Eliminated									
Jorge Núñez	12	N/A	N/A	Safe	N/A	Eliminated										
Jasmine Murray	12	N/A	Wild Card	N/A	Saved	Eliminated										
Ricky Braddy		Wild Card	N/A	N/A	Eliminated											
Tatiana Del Toro		Wild Card	N/A	N/A	Eliminated											
Jesse Langseth		N/A	Wild Card	N/A	Eliminated											
Von Smith		N/A	N/A	Wild Card	Eliminated											
Arianna Afsar		N/A	N/A	Eliminated												
Felicia Barton		N/A	N/A	Eliminated												
Kendall Beard		N/A	N/A	Eliminated												
Ju'Not Joyner		N/A	N/A	Eliminated												
Nathaniel Marshall		N/A	N/A	Eliminated												
Kristen McNamara		N/A	N/A	Eliminated												
Taylor Vaifanua		N/A	N/A	Eliminated												
Alex Wagner-Trugman		N/A	N/A	Eliminated												
Matt Breitzke		N/A	Eliminated													
Mishavonna Henson		N/A	Eliminated													
Kai Kalama		N/A	Eliminated													
Nick Mitchell		N/A	Eliminated													
Jeanine Vailes		N/A	Eliminated													
Ann Marie Boskovich		Eliminated														
Casey Carlson		Eliminated														
Stephen Fowler		Eliminated														
Brent Keith		Eliminated														
Jackie Tohn		Eliminated														
Stevie Wright		Eliminated														

== Controversies ==
In the top 13, the expected telephone number for contestant Alexis Grace, 1-866-IDOLS-13, was not owned by American Idol, but by a company called Intimate Encounters, who used it as a phone sex line. Although host Ryan Seacrest mentioned the replacement phone number, 1-866-IDOLS-36, several times, some commentators feared that the phone number confusion could lead to Grace being inadvertently voted off the show. However, Grace was not voted off that week.

After the top 11 program, Justin Guarini, while hosting Idol Wrap on TV Guide channel, asserted that the show's group performances were being lip-synced. Soon after Guarini's assertion was aired, a spokesperson for the producers of American Idol said, "The Idols don't lip-sync, period." The following day, the same spokesperson said that "due to extensive choreography and to balance their voices with open mics against a screaming audience, the Idols do sing along to their own prerecorded vocal track during the group performances only." The spokesperson maintained that the performers sing their solo songs live, but their performances available to download through iTunes are recorded prior to airing.

Kris Allen's win over Adam Lambert resulted in controversy about the voting process, prompted by a claim that of the nearly 100 million votes cast, as many as "38 million" votes may have come from Arkansas, which was Allen's home state, despite the fact that the state only had a population of 2.86 million people at the time. Although the claim was later retracted, it resulted in allegations that AT&T may have influenced the results. Fox had previously denied these claims as baseless, stating that the network has no preference on who the winner might be. AT&T meanwhile said in a statement that the vote tally above was based on incorrect information and apologized by saying that "AT&T does not divulge or confirm how many votes were cast in any state." On May 27, 2009, the producers of the show said that they "stand by the outcome" and are "absolutely certain" that "without a doubt Kris Allen is the American Idol."

== Awards and nominations ==
=== Primetime Emmy Awards ===
Year	Category	Nominee(s)	Episode	Result
2009	Outstanding Reality Show or Reality Competition	American Idol		Nominated
2009	Outstanding Directing For a Variety, Music Or Comedy Special	Bruce Gowers	Show 833 (The Final Three)	Won
2009	Outstanding Host for a Reality-Competition Program	Ryan Seacrest		Nominated

=== Teen Choice Awards ===
Year	Category	Nominee(s)	Result
2009	Choice Male Reality/Variety Star	Kris Allen	Nominated
2009	Choice Male Reality/Variety Star	Adam Lambert	Won
2009	Choice Summer Tour	American Idol Top 10	Nominated

== U.S. Nielsen ratings ==
The eighth season was the top show for the 2008–09 broadcast primetime season and took the top two spots for its Tuesday and Wednesday episodes. The viewers number for the Wednesday episodes averaged 25.527 million, while the Tuesday episodes averaged 24.741 million. The ratings were down from the seventh season, with the finale dropping 13% in the 18–49 demo and 9% in total viewers number.

Episode list

Show	Episode	Air date	Week rank	Rating/ Share	18–49 rating/Share	Viewers (millions)
1	"Phoenix Auditions"	January 13, 2009	2	15.8 / 23	11.7 / 28	30.424
2	"Kansas City Auditions"	January 14, 2009	3	16.4 / 25	11.8 / 30	30.322
3	"San Francisco Auditions"	January 20, 2009	2	12.1 / 18	9.0 / 22	22.773
4	"Louisville Auditions"	January 21, 2009	1	14.3 / 22	9.8 / 24	25.897
5	"Jacksonville Auditions"	January 27, 2009	4	13.7 / 20	9.6 / 24	25.539
6	"Salt Lake City Auditions"	January 28, 2009	3	15.0 / 23	10.1 / 25	27.364
7	"New York & San Juan Auditions"	January 29, 2009	5	13.6 / 21	9.3 / 25	24.613
8	"Hollywood Round, Part 1"	February 3, 2009	1	14.7 / 22	10.0 / 25	26.601
9	"Hollywood Round, Part 2"	February 4, 2009	2	14.8 / 23	9.9 / 27	26.384
10	"Hollywood Round, Part 3"	February 10, 2009	2	13.9 / 21	9.2	24.941
11	"Hollywood Round, Part 4"	February 11, 2009	1	14.0 / 22	9.5	24.825
12	"Group 1 Semi-finalists Perform"	February 17, 2009	2	14.3 / 21	9.6	25.374
13	"Group 1 Results Show"	February 18, 2009	3	14.1 / 22	9.0 / 24	24.790
14	"Group 2 Semi-finalists Perform"	February 25, 2009	1	13.8 / 21	9.1	24.541
15	"Group 2 Results Show"	February 26, 2009	2	11.9 / 19	7.1 / 19	20.889
16	"Group 3 Semi-finalists Perform"	March 3, 2009	1	13.8 / 21	9.0	24.309
17	"Group 3 Results Show"	March 4, 2009	2	13.1 / 21	7.8 / 22	22.776
18	"Wild Card Round"	March 5, 2009	3	12.2 / 19	7.6 / 20	21.498
19	"Top 13 Perform"	March 10, 2009	1	14.6 / 23	9.5	25.767
20	"Top 13 Results""	March 11, 2009	2	14.6 / 22	9.1 / 22	25.547
21	"Top 11 Perform"	March 17, 2009	2	12.3 / 19	8.1 / 21	21.886
22	"Top 11 Results"	March 18, 2009	1	13.7 / 21	8.7	23.705
23	"Top 10 Perform"	March 25, 2009	1	14.7 / 23	9.3	26.025
24	"Top 10 Results"	March 26, 2009	2	13.2 / 21	7.7	23.102
25	"Top 9 Perform"	March 31, 2009	1	13.7 / 21	8.9	24.410
26	"Top 9 Results"	April 1, 2009	2	14.2 / 22	8.4 / 20	24.342
27	"Top 8 Perform"	April 7, 2009	2	13.1 / 21	8.1 / 22	22.813
28	"Top 8 Results"	April 8, 2009	1	13.4 / 21	8.0 / 20	22.976
29	"Top 7 Perform"	April 14, 2009	1	13.8 / 21	8.2 / 23	24.378
30	"Top 7 Results"	April 15, 2009	2	14.0 / 22	8.0 / 20	24.114
31	"Top 7 Redux"	April 21, 2009	1	13.9 / 22	8.2	23.963
32	"Top 7 Redux Results"	April 22, 2009	2	14.0 / 22	8.3	23.947
33	"Top 5 Perform"	April 28, 2009	1	13.5 / 21	8.1	23.261
34	"Top 5 Results"	April 29, 2009	2	13.2 / 20	7.7 / 19	22.369
35	"Top 4 Perform"	May 5, 2009	1	13.4 / 21	8.3	23.414
36	"Top 4 Results"	May 6, 2009	2	13.7 / 21	8.3 / 20	23.574
37	"Top 3 Perform"	May 12, 2009	2	13.0 / 22	8.0	22.712
38	"Top 3 Results"	May 13, 2009	1	14.0 / 21	8.7 / 21	24.670
39	"Top 2 Perform"	May 19, 2009	2	13.5 / 21	8.6	23.822
40	"Season 8 Finale"	May 20, 2009	1	16.1 / 27	10.0	28.838

== See also ==
- American Idols LIVE! Tour 2009
