= Megan Joy =

American singer-songwriter

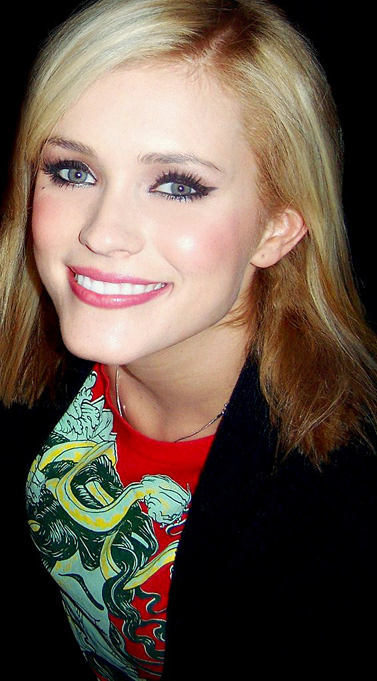
- Joy in August 2009.

Background information
- Also known as: Megan Corkrey, Megan Joy Corkrey, Megan Joy Allman
- Born: Megan Joy Knudsen; September 18, 1985 (age 41)
- Origin: Sandy, Utah, United States
- Genres: Indie pop, jazz, pop
- Occupations: Singer-songwriter, actress
- Instrument: Vocals
- Years active: 2009–present
- Label: Independent

Megan Joy (born September 18, 1985, as Megan Joy Knudsen), formerly known as Megan Joy Corkrey, is an American singer-songwriter and actress from Sandy, Utah, who was the ninth place finalist on the eighth season of American Idol. Joy released her debut album, Megan Joy, on April 25, 2012. She fronts classical folk project, Bloody Cabaret, and indie rock band, VadaWave.

Joy was featured on the single "Another Man" by Jonny "Itch" Fox, which reached a peak position at number twelve on the Australian singles chart.

== Early life and education ==
Joy used to work as a type designer for a company called SendOutCards. She has a mom, a stepdad, a sister, and a brother named CJ. According to Joy, she began to sing at a very young age. She has stated that she is musically inspired by, among others, Björk after listening to her when she was 16. Joy revealed that she "tried out for everything I could think of during junior high, in high school – didn't make anything," she added that "Even the choir that anyone can be in, I wouldn't even make like a silly little solo." "It was sad," Joy said. "I cried a lot in those years." "I've never tried writing [songs], so I don't know what's inside, but maybe it's something super different and awesome that, you know, is new." Joy originally had no plans to audition for American Idol because she thought she would "never in a million years" even make it past round one of auditions. However, her friends and family encouraged her to try out for the show and she did. Joy has said that "for the first time in my life, it was a crossroads where anything can happen, so why not go for what I love to do." Joy revealed that right before Idol, "I was at my lowest." "I was depressed and miserable. I lost myself. Idol gave me myself back. I fell back in love with music and got back my confidence." She has also said that, "My goals at that time was to move out of my mom's, save up enough money to go back to school, and figure out what I was going to do with myself." Joy is a graduate of Taylorsville High School in Taylorsville, Utah.

== American Idol ==
Before American Idol, Joy has said that she has never had any formal singing classes.

Joy auditioned for the eighth season of American Idol in Salt Lake City, Utah, in 2008, coincidentally on her birthday. She sang "Can't Help Lovin' Dat Man" by Jerome Kern and Oscar Hammerstein II. Simon Cowell said she had a seriously good voice and he loved it and Kara DioGuardi said that Joy was an interesting girl and that she had an incredible face. Joy then advanced to the Hollywood audition rounds with all of the judges saying yes. Joy had to have a sing-off with another contestant (later identified as Lacey Brown, who eventually became a Season 9 contestant) who hoped to make the competition's Top 36, with Joy being the one picked by the judges.

Cowell has said during his critique on Joy's "Put Your Records On" performance during the semi-final rounds that she "had a rough middle stage in the competition" referring to the Hollywood audition rounds. Joy was not one of the three finalists chosen out of her semi-final performance group. Joy returned for the "Wild Card" show, sang KT Tunstall's "Black Horse and the Cherry Tree" and was selected by the judges to be in the Top 13.

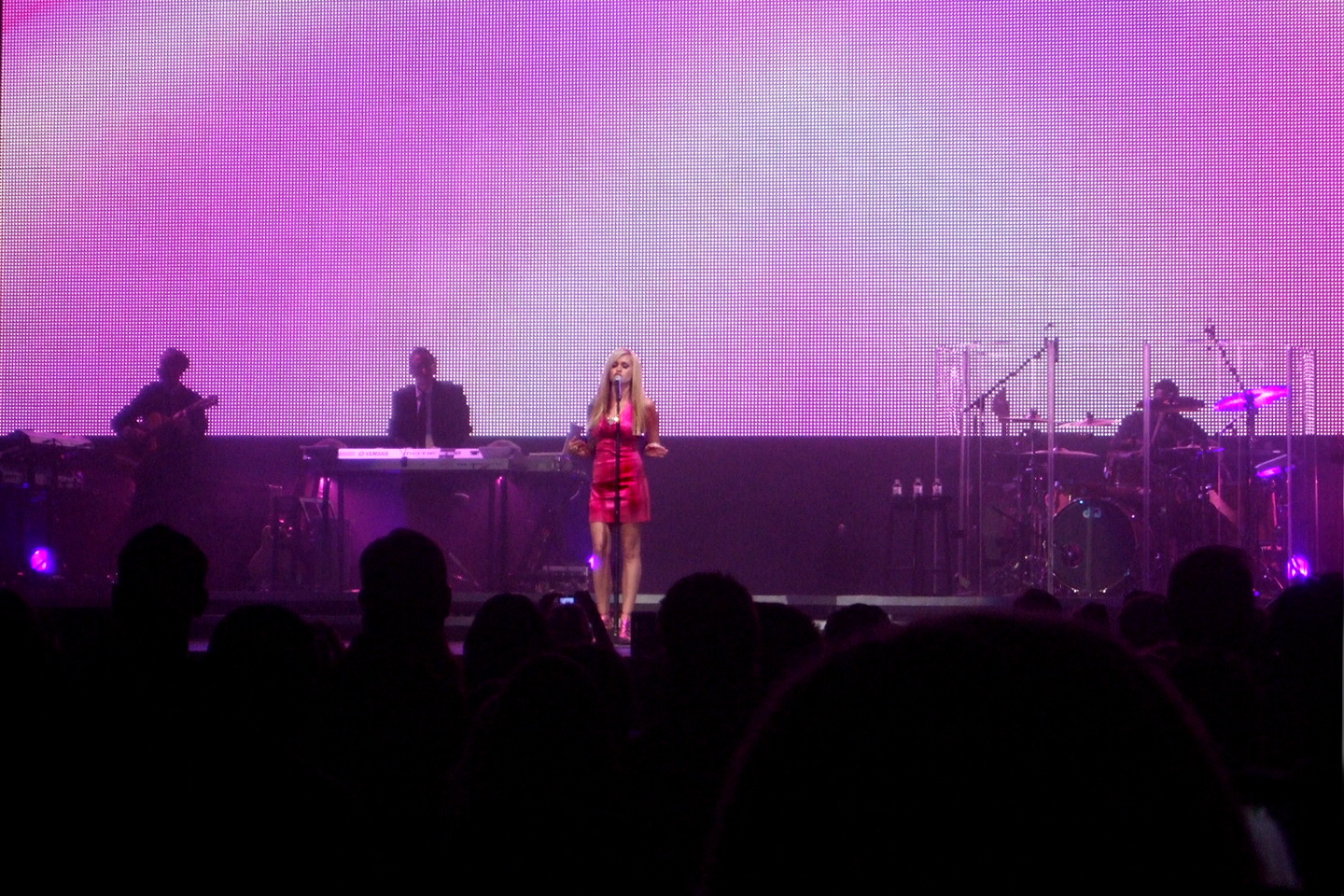
Joy performing during the American Idols Live! Tour 2009.

Joy kicked off her run in the finals with mostly negative critiques from the judges on her performance of the Jackson 5's "Rockin' Robin". DioGuardi praised Joy for being able to put her signature on everything she touches and with Randy Jackson in agreement adding "That's so Megan". Randy added that the song choice didn't really allow her to be Megan. Paula said that she felt disconnected from Joy and that "we didn't hear that sound that we love[from you]".

During Grand Ole Opry week, Joy had caught the Influenza B virus and was so sick with the flu that she was hooked up to an IV just minutes before taking the stage. Despite being so ill, Joy pulled off a rendition of Patsy Cline's "Walkin' After Midnight." All four judges were extremely impressed with Joy's performance and Simon Cowell even said, "You should have the flu every week!".

On Motown Night, Joy performed a cover of the Stevie Wonder classic "For Once in My Life" and mentor, Smokey Robinson, said that he believed she was one of the most original contestants American Idol has ever had on the show.

On Top Downloads night, Joy performed "Turn Your Lights Down Low" and she thought the judges were going to feel her this time but they didn't. The judges thought her performance was not good. DioGuardi said that it was not the song choice for her and she thought Adele would've been better. She then added that she really liked Joy but thought she was in trouble.

On her elimination night, when Megan Joy was asked by Ryan Seacrest on what she thought about what Simon Cowell said about her performance of "Turn Your Lights Down Low" the previous night on Top Downloads Week, she said "I love you Simon, but I didn't really care", in response to him calling her performance "boring, indulgent, and monotonous". Simon responded, "Megan, with the greatest respect, when you said that you don't care – nor do we. So I'm not going to pretend that we're even going to contemplate saving you." Joy had never been in the Bottom 3 prior to her elimination.

Despite all the bickering though, Joy says that she and Cowell remain on good terms. After her elimination, she says they both laughed and he told her that he enjoyed watching her.

Joy performed a duet of "Pretty Flowers" with Michael Sarver in the finale.

Cowell said to Extra in an interview after Megan Joy's elimination, that he would not have used the judge's save on contestant Anoop Desai because he had a feeling Desai was going to be in the Bottom 3 again next week in the Top 6 and the judge's save was only available until the Top 5, so he instead saved Matt Giraud, but it could have been Megan Joy instead. Joy has revealed during an after-Idol interview with TV Guide that there is a possibility that she "obviously blew" her chance at being saved from elimination.

While on the show, Megan developed a trademark twisty dance that she does while singing. After performing "Rockin' Robin" during Michael Jackson week on American Idol, Megan also shouted "Caw Caw!" at the end of the song which has now become her trademark as well.

DioGuardi mentioned on an appearance on The Tonight Show with Jay Leno that Megan Joy was one of her favorite two singers in the competition with the other one being Adam Lambert, and Cowell has also expressed numerous times that Joy is one of his favorites.

Week #	Theme	Song choice	Original artist	Order #	Result
Audition	N/A	"Can't Help Lovin' Dat Man"	Helen Morgan	N/A	Advanced
Hollywood	First Solo	"First Love" [not aired]	Adele	N/A	Advanced
Hollywood	Group Performance	"The Sweet Escape" [not aired]	Gwen Stefani	N/A	Advanced
Hollywood	Second Solo	"If I Ain't Got You" [not aired]	Alicia Keys	N/A	Advanced
Top 36/Semi-final 2	Billboard Hot 100 Hits to Date	"Put Your Records On"	Corinne Bailey Rae	7	Eliminated^{1}
Wild Card	N/A	"Black Horse and the Cherry Tree"	KT Tunstall	3	Selected
Top 13	Michael Jackson	"Rockin' Robin"	Bobby Day	10	Safe
Top 11	Grand Ole Opry	"Walkin' After Midnight"	Patsy Cline	10	Safe
Top 10	Motown	"For Once in My Life"	Jean DuShon	4	Safe
Top 9	Top Downloads	"Turn Your Lights Down Low"	Bob Marley & The Wailers	2	Eliminated

- ^Note 1: Megan Joy was initially eliminated, as she did not receive enough votes to advance immediately into the Finals. However, on the March 4 results show, Simon Cowell selected her as one of the 8 Wild Card contenders.

== Post-Idol career ==
Joy appeared on Live with Regis and Kelly and the Today show on April 6, The Ellen DeGeneres Show on April 13, and Larry King Live. She has stated in interviews that if she had stayed on American Idol for another week, she would have sung "Separate Lives" by Stephen Bishop and "Sally's Song" for "Songs from the Cinema" week. On April 6, she was on Access Hollywood where she sang "Walkin' After Midnight" by Patsy Cline. On the Grand Finale of American Idol, she performed a duet of "Pretty Flowers" by Steve Martin with Michael Sarver, and with Martin playing the banjo in the back. It was reported that Fleetwood Mac singer Stevie Nicks might possibly be interested in having Megan Joy play her part in an unnamed Fleetwood Mac biopic. In the article, Megan's voice was noted as being similar to Nicks'. It was suggested that Nicks would prefer Megan playing the part over Lindsay Lohan, who had expressed interest in the part. Nicks had previously gone so far as to say "over my dead body," regarding the possibility of casting Lohan. Independent filmmaker Jane Bell has expressed an interest in working with Megan Joy, also, quoted as saying "She simply has too much presence, almost a Grace Kelly kind of thing. You can't help but gape at her."

Joy completed the American Idols LIVE! Tour 2009, which ran from July 5, 2009, to September 15, 2009. She performed "Put Your Records On" by Corinne Bailey Rae and "Tears Dry on Their Own" by Amy Winehouse. She announced via Twitter on September 24, 2009, that she was in Los Angeles having some meetings and that she has started writing material for her debut album. Joy also appeared in a local commercial in Draper, Utah for a clothing store called Castle Couture. She made an appearance at a SendOutCards Convention in Utah on Saturday, September 26, 2009. As a former employee of the company Megan talked about her Idol experience and sang two songs, "Black Horse and the Cherry Tree" by KT Tunstall and "Daydreamer" by Adele. Joy also announced via Twitter on October 1, 2009, that the name of her band that she has started would be called Joirider.

On October 27, 2009, Joy attended the grand opening of "Pandora" at Vibiana in Los Angeles, California. She also attended Gen Art's 12th Annual 'Fresh Faces in Fashion' at the Petersen Automotive Museum on October 29, 2009, in Los Angeles, California. Joy also walked the runway while modeling a pink dress for the L.A. Fashion Week Fall 2009 Pink Dress Collection.

Joy announced via Twitter on November 2, 2009, that she had recorded three songs so far and that her album was in the works. On Sunday, November 29, 2009, Joy uploaded two of her songs called "Feel Love" and "Incomplete" on her MySpace. On December 14, 2009, Joy performed a duet of "Silent Night" with Kevin Griffin from Better Than Ezra at a Barenaked Ladies concert. On January 6, 2010, Megan stated in an online chat interview with ainow.org that she has worked with, among others, Benji Madden of Good Charlotte on some songs. She also stated that her album was due for a mid-2010 release, and that labels are interested in signing her. Joy had worked on 14 songs at that point, and she also debuted one of her new songs called "Sweet Love". On February 2, 2010, Joy revealed via Twitter that new songs would be coming very soon. On Saturday, February 13, 2010, Joy released a new song called "Ryder On The Storm" on her Facebook. On Monday, February 22, 2010, Joy revealed another new song called "Boy Next Door" which was uploaded to her MySpace and was also featured on one of the episodes of the ABC show The Deep End. On February 27, 2010, Joy uploaded a new song called "I'm Not Tryin' To Hear That" on her Facebook. In March 2010, Megan uploaded a new song titled "Trouble Me" to her Myspace Page.

Joy tried acting with a small role in the film Hall Pass, but her role was cut in the released film. On February 24, 2011, Joy released a music video for "Two Rivers", one of her songs that was included on her debut album. Joy originally planned to release her debut EP in the Summer or Fall of 2011. However, due to circumstances, the goal was moved to an early January 2012 release. Joy's first EP was supported by funds from her friends, backers, and fans through Kickstarter, an online threshold pledge system for funding creative projects. On August 29, 2011, Joy released her own rendition of "Never Never" by Little Dragon on YouTube, as well as a tribute music video to go along with the song. On October 4, 2011, the song "Twice", yet another Little Dragon tribute cover, was released on YouTube. On October 13, 2011, Joy revealed one of her new songs titled "Can't Bring Me Down" on her Tumblr and Kickstarter pages.

She released her debut album, Megan Joy, on April 25, 2012, on Bandcamp. It contained nine tracks, and was produced by Joy and Matt Winegar.

Joy and her husband Quinn Allman are in the upcoming movie, "Writer's Cramp." The movie production company also filmed two music videos which were released in 2013 and 2015.

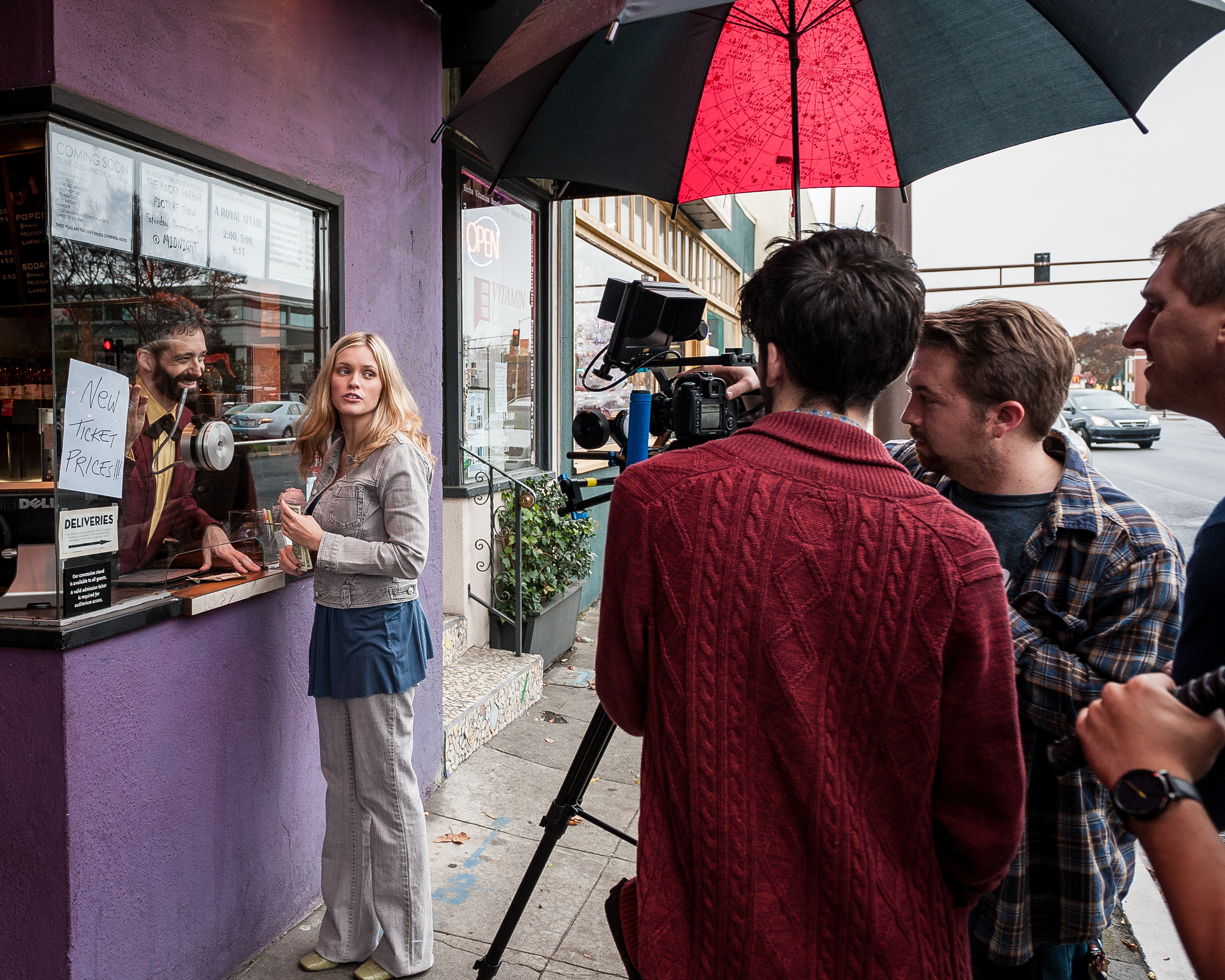
Megan Joy on Writer's Cramp set at Guild Theater, Nov 29, 2012

Joy released her second album, Free to Fly, on January 21, 2014.

In 2016, she started the band VadaWave with husband Quinn.

== Philanthropy ==
Joy teamed up with The Bethel Foundation, an organization that helps get single mothers back on their feet, to raise money and she also hosted one of their events on Friday, November 13, 2009, at the Coca-Cola Bricktown Events Center in Oklahoma City.

== Personal life ==
Joy used to be a divorced single mother. She has a son named Ryder. She appeared in the Idol auditions phase as Megan Corkrey and then added her middle name Joy during the semi-finals. After the Wildcard episode, she dropped her last name, stating it was her ex-husband's and that she wanted to be known as Megan Joy from there on out. Joy has joint custody of her son and it was during her time on American Idol that her custody battle was "raging," making it the "hardest time of my life," she says. Joy has said during an interview that she currently has ten tattoos and that she plans to get another one on her ribs.

Joy is married to Quinn Allman, founder member of rock band The Used and they have two sons.

Studio albums

Year	Album details
2012	Megan Joy: 1. When it Turns; 2. Longing; 3. What is Love; 4. Trouble Me; 5. Dream Love; 6. Two Rivers; 7. Rainclouds; 8. Can't Bring Me Down; 9. Ryder on the Storm; Released: April 25, 2012; Format: Digital download
2014	Free to Fly: 1. Boy Next Door; 2. Double Life; 3. Spell It Out; 4. Lovesick; 5. Like a Secret; 6. I'm Not Trying to Hear That; 7. Some Girls; 8. Shooting Stars; 9. Feel Love; 10. Incomplete; 11. Sweet Love; 12. Free to Fly; Released: January 21, 2014; Format: CD, digital download

== Songs in other media ==
Year	Title	Type	Song
2010	The Deep End	TV series episode: "An Innocent Man"	"Boy Next Door"

== Filmography ==
Film
Year	Film	Role
2011	Hall Pass (deleted scene)	Burger Girl
2012	Writers Cramp	Siren

== Awards and nominations ==
Year	Presenter	Award	Result
2009	Teen Choice Awards	Choice Summer Tour (shared with American Idol Top 10)	Nominated
