= Kennedy Rose =

American country music duo

- Origin: United States
- Genres: Country
- Years active: 1989-1994
- Labels: I.R.S. Records
- Spinoff of: Calamity Jane
- Past members: Mary Ann Kennedy; Pam Rose

Kennedy Rose was an American country music duo composed of singer-songwriters Mary Ann Kennedy and Pam Rose. Both members of the duo previously recorded in the all-women band Calamity Jane on Columbia Records in the 1980s. After splitting from the band, Kennedy and Rose founded the duo and signed to I.R.S. Records. As Kennedy Rose, they released two albums for the label: hai ku in 1989 and Walk the Line in 1994. Following the release of hai ku, the duo toured with Sting. Kennedy and Rose have also written hit singles for Restless Heart ("I'll Still Be Loving You"), Lee Greenwood ("Ring on her Finger, Time on Her Hands", later covered by Reba McEntire), Patty Loveless ("You Will") and Martina McBride ("Safe in the Arms of Love", also recorded by Baillie and the Boys and Michelle Wright).

== Discography ==
=== Albums ===
Title	Details
hai ku	Release date: 1990; Label: I.R.S. Records
Walk the Line	Release date: February 8, 1994; Label: I.R.S. Records

=== Singles ===
Year	Single	Album
1990	"Love Like This"	hai ku
1990	"The Only Chain"	hai ku
