= Calamity Jane (country music band) =

American country music band

- Origin: United States
- Genres: Country
- Years active: 1981–1982
- Label: Columbia Records
- Spinoffs: Kennedy Rose
- Past members: Mary Fielder; Mary Ann Kennedy; Linda Moore; Pam Rose

Calamity Jane was an American all-female country music band composed of Mary Fielder (guitar), Mary Ann Kennedy (drums), Linda Moore (bass guitar) and Pam Rose (lead vocals). The band recorded for Columbia Records between 1981 and 1982, charting four times on the Billboard Hot Country Singles (now Hot Country Songs) charts, including the No. 44 "I've Just Seen a Face" (by Lennon- McCartney from The Beatles) from 1982. Prior to the quartet's foundation, Rose had been a solo recording artist on Capitol and Epic Records. After 1982, Kennedy and Rose split from the band and formed a singing-songwriting duo called Kennedy Rose, writing hits for Restless Heart, Lee Greenwood, and Martina McBride in addition to recording two albums for IRS Records.

== Discography ==
=== Albums ===
| Title | Details |
|---|---|
| Calamity Jane | Release date: 1982; Label: Columbia Records; Format: LP, cassette |

=== Singles ===
| Year | Single | Peak positions | Album |
| Year | Single | US Country | Album |
|---|---|---|---|
| 1981 | "Send Me Somebody to Love" | 61 | Calamity Jane |
| 1982 | "I've Just Seen a Face" | 44 | Calamity Jane |
| 1982 | "Walkin' After Midnight" | 60 | Calamity Jane |
| 1982 | "Love Wheel" | 87 | Calamity Jane |
