= Anoop Desai =

American singer

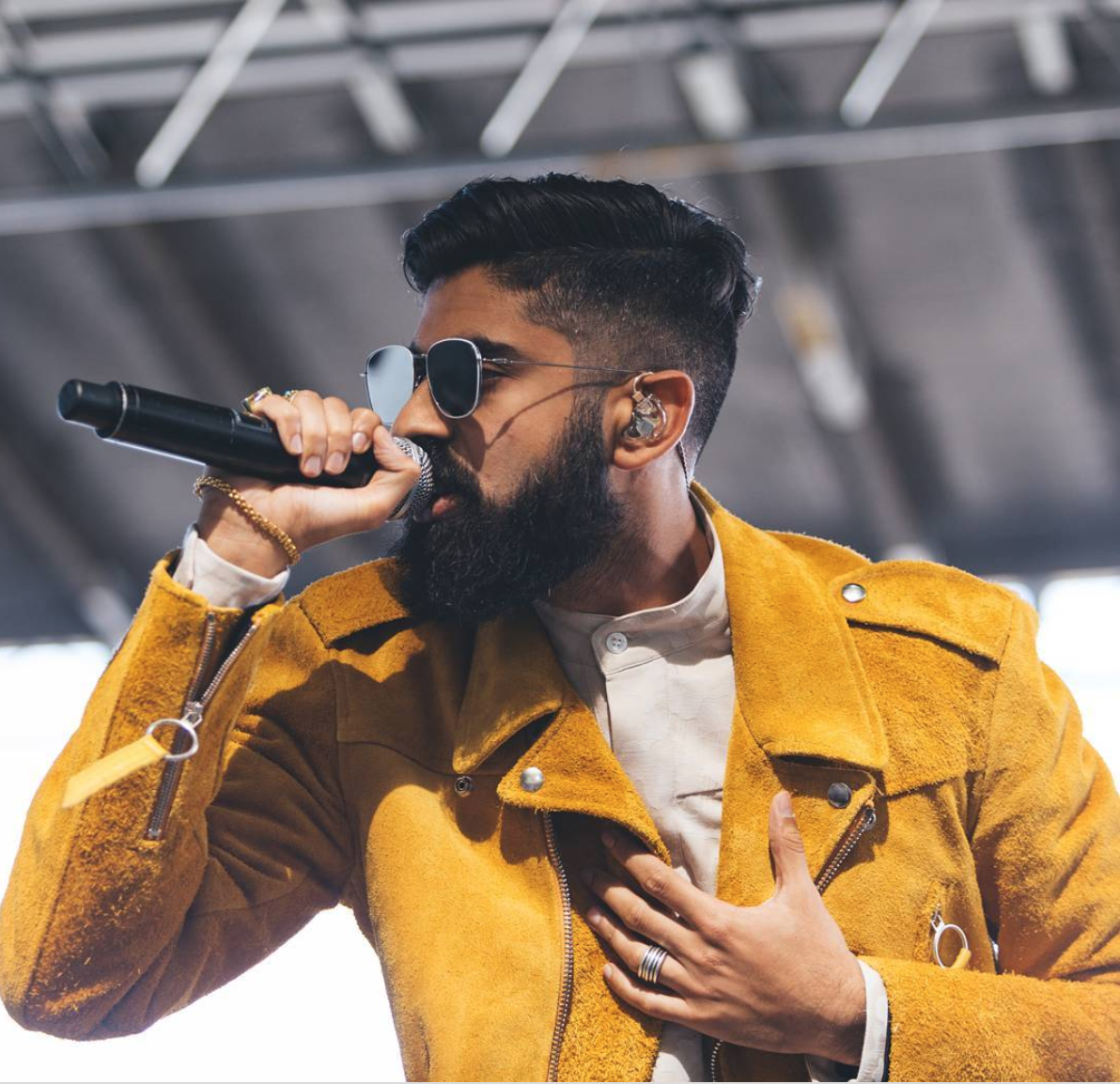
- Anoop Desai aka TOTEM at Lollapalooza

Background information
- Born: December 20, 1986 (age 39); Cary, North Carolina
- Origin: Chapel Hill, North Carolina, U.S.
- Genres: R&B; pop
- Occupations: Actor; Singer
- Instrument: Vocals
- Years active: 2009—present
- Formerly of: UNC Clef Hangers
- Website: www.anoopdesai.com

Anoop Manoj Desai (born December 20, 1986) is an American singer-songwriter and actor. He began his career as the sixth place finisher on the eighth season of American Idol, after which he began writing and performing music under the pseudonym TOTEM. Since 2020, Desai has devoted his time to acting, most notably as The Djinn on the fourth and fifth seasons of What We Do In the Shadows.

== Early life ==
Desai was born in Cary, North Carolina and grew up in Cary. His family moved to nearby Chapel Hill in 1998. Desai's father, Manoj Desai, graduated from IIT Kanpur and came to the US in 1977. His mother, Nalini Desai, grew up in Navsari, Gujarat. The family is of Gujarati descent.

In the 1990s, Desai appeared on the WRAL-TV (NC Triangle) television children's show, CentralXpress.com, and played the character "Raj". The show won multiple awards, including seven regional Emmys, two national Iris awards, and a national Gabriel Award.

Desai attended Fuller GT Magnet Elementary school, then Carnage Middle School and Phillips Middle School, then later went on to attend East Chapel Hill High School, graduating in 2004. He was awarded a four-year academic merit scholarship to attend the University of North Carolina at Chapel Hill and was the Haywood W. Hinkle Carolina scholar from 2004 to 2008.

After being accepted to the UNC, Desai joined the UNC Clef Hangers, a long-standing male a cappella group founded in 1977. Desai served as the group's music director during his junior year and as the group's president his senior year. Desai's performance as a soloist on the song "She Has No Time" was recognized with the BOCA 2007 (Best of College A Cappella).

Desai graduated from UNC in 2008 with a Bachelor of Arts degree in political science and American studies. He was awarded the 2008 Peter C. Baxter Memorial Prize in American Studies, as one who exemplified "intellectual excellence, personal warmth and creativity.

== Career ==
=== American Idol ===
Desai rose to national fame with his participation in the eighth season of American Idol. Motivated by the death of his friend Eve Carson, Desai auditioned for American Idol on August 8, 2008, in Kansas City, Missouri, and was selected as a semifinalist following his "Hollywood Week" performances. Although he was not one of the three finalists chosen out of his semifinal performance group, he returned as a "Wild Card." On that broadcast, Simon Cowell announced that Desai would continue on as a finalist as part of the first ever Top 13 in Idol history.

Desai's first finals performance of Michael Jackson's "Beat It" was panned by the judges, with Simon Cowell saying that it was "very lightweight" and that he regretted choosing Desai for the Top 13. But Desai won the judges over again the next week, when he sang Willie Nelson's classic country ballad "Always On My Mind" for "Grand Ole Opry Week." Even Cowell was impressed enough to retract his earlier remarks. Desai's rendition of Cyndi Lauper's "True Colors" three weeks later also garnered praise from the judges.

Despite celebrities such as Ellen DeGeneres and Keith Urban saying they favored Desai to win, he was voted off as part of a double elimination Top 7 week. He returned for the season finale to perform "I'm Yours" with fellow Idol contestant Alexis Grace and singer Jason Mraz.

=== Performances and results ===
Week #	Theme	Song choice	Original artist	Song Order #	Result
Audition	N/A	"Thank You"	Boyz II Men	N/A	Advanced
Hollywood	First Solo	"If It's Magic"	Stevie Wonder	N/A	Advanced
Hollywood	Group Performance	"What Becomes of the Brokenhearted"	Jimmy Ruffin	N/A	Advanced
Hollywood	Second Solo	"My Prerogative"	Bobby Brown	N/A	Advanced
Top 36/Semi-Final 1	Billboard Hot 100 Hits to Date	"Angel of Mine"	Eternal	6	Eliminated^{1}
Wild Card	N/A	"My Prerogative"	Bobby Brown	8	Selected^{2}
Top 13	Michael Jackson	"Beat It"	Michael Jackson	8	Safe
Top 11	Grand Ole Opry	"Always on My Mind"	Brenda Lee	9	Safe
Top 10	Motown	"Ooo Baby Baby"	The Miracles	5	Safe
Top 9	Top Downloads	"Caught Up"	Usher	1	Bottom 2^{3}
Top 8	Year They Were Born	"True Colors"	Cyndi Lauper	4	Bottom 2^{4}
Top 7	Songs from the Cinema	"(Everything I Do) I Do It for You" - Robin Hood: Prince of Thieves	Bryan Adams	2	Bottom 3^{5}
Top 7^{6}	Disco	"Dim All the Lights"	Donna Summer	7	Eliminated

- ^Note 1 Desai was initially eliminated, as he did not receive enough votes to advance immediately to the Top 12. However, on the March 4 results show, the American Idol judges selected him as one of the 8 Wild Card contenders.
- ^Note 2 Desai was selected as one of the finalists. His selection marked the first time in the show's history that 13 finalists were chosen.
- ^Note 3 When Ryan Seacrest announced the results in the particular night, Desai was in the bottom three, but declared safe second when Megan Joy was eliminated.
- ^Note 4 When Ryan Seacrest announced the results in the particular night, Desai was in the bottom three, but declared safe second when Scott MacIntyre was eliminated.
- ^Note 5 Desai was saved first from elimination.
- ^Note 6 Due to the judges using their one save to save Matt Giraud, the Top 7 remained intact for another week, in which there was a double elimination.

=== Post-Idol ===
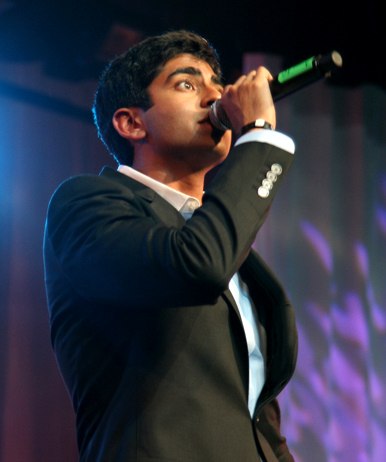
Desai in June 2011

After appearing on American Idol, Desai appeared on The Ellen DeGeneres Show, Live with Regis and Kelly, The Mo'Nique Show, Access Hollywood, Today, and local radio stations across the nation. He also performed with Amos Lee in Atlanta, Georgia. Desai was part of the American Idols LIVE! Tour 2009 with his fellow Top 10 contestants; the tour visited fifty cities in the United States and Canada from July 5 to September 15, 2009.

In 2010, Desai released his first solo single, "My Name," and his debut album, All Is Fair. Desai's second single, "All Is Fair (Crazy Love)," was selected by Clear Channel Music and he as an iHeartRadio "artist to watch" for September 2010 with this single as the featured track.

=== TOTEM ===
In 2012, Desai began writing and performing R&B leaning pop music under the pseudonym TOTEM. The first TOTEM songs were released anonymously and independently on small blogs before being picked up by the likes of FADER, Billboard, and Complex. Eventually, TOTEM garnered significant success on marquee playlists like Spotify's "New Music Friday" and "Pop Rising", and Apple Music's "Best of the Week" and "A-List Pop." In 2016, he headlined the BMI stage at Lollapalooza.

His music, including the singles "Bubblegum" and "Aftertaste," combined with music he has written for other artists, have been streamed tens of millions of times.

=== Acting ===
In 2018, Desai was offered a role in the developmental Lab of the then Broadway-bound production of The Secret Garden. In 2019, Desai made his Off-Broadway debut at MCC Theater in the world-premiere of The Wrong Man, a musical written by fellow pop songwriter Ross Golan.

In 2020, Desai made his professional on-screen debut on the fifth season of Billions. Later TV guest appearances include Little Voice, Russian Doll, and Evil. In 2021, Desai began portraying the Djinn in the fourth season of What We Do in the Shadows to wide acclaim. He reprised the role until the show completed its six season run. In late 2022, Desai was cast as Raj Masihajjar in Under the Bridge.

In 2023, Desai made his film debut in The Adults. He played Robert in Babygirl and Ben Harris in St. Denis Medical.

== Filmography ==
Year	Title	Role	Notes
2009	American Idol	Contestant	Top 6 finalist
2020	Billions	Dev Satyal	Episode: "I The Nordic Model"
2020	Little Voice	Ravi	Episode: "I Don't Know"
2022	Russian Doll	Salim	Episodes: "Schrödinger's Ruth", "Brain Drain"
2022	Evil	Larry	Episode: "The Demon of Cults"
2022–23	What We Do in the Shadows	Djinn	7 episodes
2023	The Adults	Josh	Film debut
2024	Under the Bridge	Raj Masihajjar	6 episodes
2024	Babygirl	Robert	
2025	St. Denis Medical	Ben Harris	Episode: "Listen to Your Ladybugs"

== Discography ==
=== Albums (as Anoop Desai) ===
2011	Zero.0: Release date: April 20, 2011; Label: Independent; Format: Digital download

=== Extended plays (as Anoop Desai) ===
Year	Album details	Peak positions	Certifications (sales threshold)
Year	Album details	US	Certifications (sales threshold)
2010	All Is Fair: Release date: May 4, 2010; Label: Independent; Format: Digital download	—	US sales: 900
2012	3 Cheers: Release date: November 20, 2012; Label: Independent; Format: Digital download	—	

=== Digital singles (as Anoop Desai) ===
Year	Single	Peak positions	Album
Year	Single	US	Album
2010	"My Name": Release: March 23, 2010	-	All Is Fair
2012	"Love War" (featuring Adhd): Release: November 13, 2012	-	3 Cheers

=== Select TOTEM Discography ===
Year	Title	Streams
2015	"Countdown"	901,854
2015	"All Falls Down"	689,775
2015	"Unrequited"	815,852
2015	"Heartease"	883,236
2016	"Addicted"	3,465,711
2016	"Bubblegum"	3,901,193
2017	"Hanging On"	1,541,371
2017	"Aftertaste"	7,676,130

== Awards and nominations ==
Year	Presenter	Award	Result
2009	Teen Choice Awards	Choice Summer Tour (shared with American Idol Top 10)	Nominated
