= Nothin' but the Wheel =

Single by Patty Loveless

from the album Only What I Feel
- B-side: "Love Builds The Bridges (Pride Builds The Walls)"
- Released: July 1993
- Genre: Country
- Length: 3:32
- Label: Epic
- Songwriter: John Scott Sherrill
- Producer: Emory Gordy Jr.

Patty Loveless singles chronology
"Blame It on Your Heart" (1993)	"Nothin' but the Wheel" (1993)	"You Will" (1993)

Music video
- "Nothin' but the Wheel" on YouTube

"Nothin' but the Wheel" is a song written by John Scott Sherrill, and recorded by American country music artist Patty Loveless. It was released in July 1993, by Epic Records, as the second single from her sixth album, Only What I Feel (1993). The song reached number 20 on the US Billboard Hot Country Singles & Tracks chart. Its accompanying music video was directed by Randee St. Nicholas.

== Content ==
The narrator talks about her journey driving down the highway in the early morning hours, after ending her relationship with her partner. She describes leaving everything behind and only has the wheel to hold onto as she drives along the highway.

== Charts ==
Chart (1993)	Peak position
Canada Country Singles (RPM)	23
US Hot Country Songs (Billboard)	20

== Cover version ==
Peter Wolf recorded a cover version on his 2002 album Sleepless. Mick Jagger added harmonica and vocals.
