= Easy to Please =

Single by Janie Fricke

from the album Somebody Else's Fire
- B-side: "Party Shoes"
- Released: January 1986
- Genre: Country
- Length: 2:43
- Label: Columbia
- Songwriter(s): Kent Robbins, Kye Fleming
- Producer(s): Bob Montgomery

Janie Fricke singles chronology
"Somebody Else's Fire" (1985)	"Easy to Please" (1986)	"Always Have, Always Will" (1986)

"Easy to Please" is a song written by Kent Robbins and Kye Fleming, and recorded by American country music artist Janie Fricke. It was released in February 1986 as the third single from the album Somebody Else's Fire. The song reached #5 on the Billboard Hot Country Singles & Tracks chart.

== Chart performance ==
Chart (1986)	Peak position
US Hot Country Songs (Billboard)	5
Canadian RPM Country Tracks	15
