= Michael Sarver (album) =

Studio album by Michael Sarver
- Released: July 27, 2010
- Genre: Country, pop, soul
- Label: Dream Records; Fontana Distribution
- Producer: Rachel Thibodeau

Michael Sarver chronology
Michael Sarver (2010)	Christmas (2010)

Singles from Michael Sarver
- 1. "You Are / Cinderella Girl" Released: December 8, 2009; 2. "Ferris Wheel" Released: April 20, 2010

Michael Sarver is the self-titled solo debut studio album by American Idol finalist and singer-songwriter Michael Sarver. It was released on July 27, 2010 under Dream Records/Fontana Distribution.

== Track listing ==
No.	Title	Lyrics	Length
1.	"Watch Me"	Michael Sarver, Rachel Thibodeau, Kyle Jacobs	3:33
2.	"Baby I Want You"	Sarver, Thibodeau, Jacobs	2:47
3.	"Ferris Wheel"	Thibodeau, Josh Kelley, Jacobs	3:11
4.	"Gonna Be a Good Night"	Sarver, Thibodeau, Ben Glover	3:10
5.	"Safe"	Jacobs, Glover, Todd Taylor	3:59
6.	"Give It To Me"	Thibodeau, Joe Leathers, Jacobs	3:50
7.	"I'm in the Mood"	Thibodeau, Tebey Otto, Sebastian Trott	2:56
8.	"Let Me Love You"	Thibodeau, Terry Sawchuck, Andrew Rollins	3:48
9.	"Cinderella Girl"	David Hanley, Tisha Sanchez, Sarver	3:42
10.	"The Way She Loves Me"	Thibodeau, Kelley, Jacobs	4:04
11.	"Always Surviving"	Thibodeau, Rivers Rutherford	2:59
12.	"Tell Me"	Sarver, Thibodeau	4:45
13.	"You Are"	Sarver	3:31
14.	"Angels Sing" (iTunes Bonus Track)	Hanley	4:17

== Personnel ==
- Michael Sarver – Vocals

Background Vocals

- Perry Coleman
- Rachel Thibodeau
- Tyler Logan
- Joel Bodker
- Tate Huff
- Zach Logan

Musicians

- Kenny Greenburg – Guitar
- Adam Shoenfeld – Guitar
- Tom Bukovac – Guitar
- Nick Buda – Drums
- Shannon Forrest – Drums
- Ilya Toshinsky – Acoustic Guitar
- Mark Hill – Bass
- Gordon Mote – Piano
- Mike Rojas – Keyboards

== Chart performance ==
Chart (2010)	Peak position
U.S. Billboard Top Country Albums	58
U.S. Billboard Top Heatseekers	45
