= Scott McIntyre (politician) =

American politician (1933–2009)

Member of the Iowa House of Representatives
- In office 1967–1971

Personal details
- Born: May 10, 1933 Cedar Rapids, Iowa, U.S.
- Died: October 6, 2009 (aged 76) Cedar Rapids, Iowa, U.S.
- Party: Republican
- Occupation: Insurance

Scott McIntyre, Jr. (May 10, 1933 – October 6, 2009) was an American politician in the state of Iowa.

"Scotty" McIntyre was born in Cedar Rapids, Iowa. He worked in the insurance industry. His father John Scott McIntyre was the founder of United Fire Group, at which John Scott Jr. would later become the chairman of.

He served in the Iowa House of Representatives from 1967 to 1979 as a Republican.

He was the father of two; Kaye and Kent, and the husband of Dee Ann McIntyre, who is an American artist.
