= Blame It on Your Heart =

- Cassette single cover

Single by Patty Loveless

from the album Only What I Feel
- B-side: "What's a Broken Heart"
- Released: April 3, 1993
- Recorded: 1993
- Genre: Country
- Length: 3:34
- Label: Epic
- Songwriters: Harlan Howard; Kostas
- Producer: Emory Gordy Jr.

Patty Loveless singles chronology
| "Send a Message to My Heart" (1992) | "Blame It on Your Heart" (1993) | "Nothin' but the Wheel" (1993) |

"Blame It on Your Heart" is a song written by Harlan Howard and Kostas and recorded by American country music artist Patty Loveless. It was released in April 1993 as the first single from her album Only What I Feel. A cover version by Deborah Allen was featured prominently in the 1993 film The Thing Called Love.

== Content ==
The song and its video describe an ex-boyfriend who has a "lying, cheating, cold dead-beating, two-timing, double-dealing, mean-mistreating, loving" heart that he should blame for whatever backstabbing he gets from any other woman he does to what he did to its narrator.

== Music video ==
The music video for "Blame It on Your Heart" was directed by Sherman Halsey, and premiered in early 1993. David Keith played the ex-boyfriend in the video.

== Critical reception ==
In 2024, Rolling Stone ranked the song at number 147 on its "200 Greatest Country Songs of All Time" ranking.

== Chart performance ==
The song charted for 20 weeks on the Billboard Hot Country Singles and Tracks chart, reaching number 1 during the week of June 19, 1993.

=== Weekly charts ===
| Chart (1993) | Peak position |
|---|---|
| Canada Country Singles (RPM) | 2 |
| US Bubbling Under Hot 100 (Billboard) | 12 |
| US Hot Country Songs (Billboard) | 1 |

=== Year-end charts ===
| Chart (1993) | Position |
|---|---|
| Canada Country Tracks (RPM) | 18 |
| US Country Songs (Billboard) | 12 |
