= Somebody Else's Fire (song) =

Single by Janie Fricke

from the album Somebody Else's Fire
- B-side: "My Heart's Hearin' Footsteps"
- Released: August 1985
- Genre: Country
- Length: 3:10
- Label: Columbia
- Songwriter(s): Pat Bunch, Pam Rose, Mary Ann Kennedy
- Producer(s): Bob Montgomery

Janie Fricke singles chronology
"She's Single Again" (1985)	"Somebody Else's Fire" (1985)	"Easy to Please" (1986)

"Somebody Else's Fire" is a song written by Pat Bunch, Pam Rose and Mary Ann Kennedy, and recorded by American country music artist Janie Fricke. It was released in September 1985 as the second single and title track from the album Somebody Else's Fire. The song reached #4 on the Billboard Hot Country Singles & Tracks chart.

== Chart performance ==
Chart (1985)	Peak position
US Hot Country Songs (Billboard)	4
Canadian RPM Country Tracks	4
