= Michael Sarver =

American singer

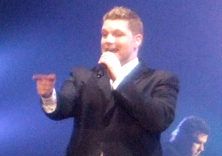
- Sarver performing during the American Idol Live Concert Tour in Tulsa, Oklahoma.

Background information
- Born: March 28, 1981 (age 45); Sulphur, Louisiana
- Origin: Jasper, Texas, United States
- Genres: R&B, soul, rock, pop, country
- Occupations: Singer, oil rig roughneck worker
- Instruments: Vocals, piano, guitar, drums
- Years active: 2009–present
- Label: Dream Records/Fontana Distribution
- Website: http://michaelsarver.com

Michael Sarver (born March 28, 1981) is an American singer who was the tenth place finalist on the eighth season of American Idol. Sarver made it to the top 13 but was eliminated when the panel of judges were unable to unanimously agree to save him. As Sarver was in the top 10, however, he participated in the American Idols Live! Tour 2009. Sarver signed with Dream Records/Universal Music Group in December 2009. That same month, he joined "Idol" alums Gina Glocksen, David Hernandez and Alexis Grace on the American Stars In Concert Tour. He released a self-titled debut album in July 2010, and three songs - "You Are", "Cinderella Girl", and "Ferris Wheel" - were released as singles. Sarver left Dream Records in 2012.

== Early life ==
Sarver was born in Sulphur, Louisiana, and graduated from Sulphur High School. He has two children, McKenna and Grayson. He has written over 1100 songs for himself and others since the age of 14, and has also been singing since he was an adolescent. Prior to American Idol, Sarver worked as a roughneck on an oil rig.

== American Idol ==
=== Overview ===
Sarver auditioned for the eighth season of American Idol in Phoenix, Arizona. During the first semi-finals week, he was able to garner enough votes to allow him to continue, beating fellow contestant Anoop Desai for the third spot by just over 20,000 votes. He was eliminated on March 26, 2009, after the panel of judges were unable to unanimously agree to save him. As Sarver was in the top 10, he was able to perform on the American Idols Live! Tour 2009.

=== Performances/Results ===
| Week # | Theme | Song choice | Original artist | Order # | Result |
| Audition | N/A | "Thank You" | Boyz II Men | N/A | Advanced |
| Hollywood | First Solo | "More Than Anyone" | Gavin DeGraw | N/A | Advanced |
| Hollywood | Group Performance | "Some Kind of Wonderful" | Soul Brothers Six | N/A | Advanced |
| Hollywood | Second Solo | "All or Nothing" | O-Town | N/A | Advanced |
| Top 36/Semi-Final 1 | Billboard Hot 100 Hits to Date | "I Don't Want to Be" | Gavin DeGraw | 8 | Advanced |
| Top 13 | Michael Jackson | "You Are Not Alone" | Michael Jackson | 4 | Safe |
| Top 11 | Grand Ole Opry | "Ain't Goin' Down ('Til the Sun Comes Up)" | Garth Brooks | 1 | Bottom 2^{1} |
| Top 10 | Motown | "Ain't Too Proud to Beg" | The Temptations | 6 | Eliminated |

- ^Note 1 When Ryan Seacrest announced the results in the particular night, Sarver was in the bottom three, but declared safe second when Alexis Grace was eliminated.

== Post-Idol ==
Sarver signed with Dream Records/Universal Music Group in December 2009. That same month, he joined "Idol" alums Gina Glocksen, David Hernandez and Alexis Grace on the American Stars In Concert Tour. He released a self-titled debut album in July 2010, and three songs - "You Are", "Cinderella Girl", and "Ferris Wheel" - were released as singles. His Myspace page later revealed he signed to Dream Records/Fontana Distribution. He has also become the official spokesperson for Credit Power Educational Foundation, Inc. In June 2010, Sarver launched a web site http://michaelsarver.com. In 2012, Sarver left Dream Records due to the inability of the label to fulfill their contractual obligations.

== Discography ==
=== Studio albums ===
| Title | Album details | Peak chart positions | |
| Title | Album details | US Country | US Heat |
|---|---|---|---|
| Michael Sarver | Release date: July 27, 2010; Label: Dream Records/Fontana | 58 | 45 |
| Christmas | Release date: November 30, 2010; Label: Independently released | — | — |
| Begin Again | Release date: June 9, 2015; Label: Independently released | — | — |
"—" denotes releases that did not chart

=== Singles ===
| Year | Single | Peak positions | Album |
| Year | Single | US Country | Album |
|---|---|---|---|
| 2009 | "You Are" | — | Michael Sarver |
| 2009 | "Cinderella Girl" | — | Michael Sarver |
| 2010 | "Ferris Wheel" | — | Michael Sarver |
"—" denotes releases that did not chart

=== Music videos ===
| Year | Video | Director |
|---|---|---|
| 2010 | "Ferris Wheel" | Bender/Jarboe |
| 2014 | "Miss You Something Crazy" | Jarboe |

== Awards and nominations ==
| Year | Presenter | Award | Result |
|---|---|---|---|
| 2009 | Teen Choice Awards | Choice Summer Tour (shared with American Idol Top 10) | Nominated |
