= You Will (song) =

- Cassette Single Cover

Single by Patty Loveless

from the album Only What I Feel
- B-side: "You Don't Know How Lucky You Are"
- Released: November 11, 1993
- Recorded: 1993
- Genre: Country
- Length: 3:16
- Label: Epic
- Songwriters: Pam Rose, Mary Ann Kennedy, Randy Sharp
- Producer: Emory Gordy Jr.

Patty Loveless singles chronology
"Nothin' but the Wheel" (1993)	"You Will" (1993)	"How Can I Help You Say Goodbye" (1994)

"You Will" is a country song written by Mary Ann Kennedy, Pam Rose, and Randy Sharp and recorded by Anne Murray. The song was the title track to her 1990 studio album and was released as the album's fourth single in June 1991, but did not chart. The song was covered by Patty Loveless in early 1993. It was included on her first album with Epic Records, Only What I Feel, her sixth studio album. The song was released as the album's third single in November 1993.

== Background ==
This song was originally recorded in the summer of 1992 for MCA Records, and in fact performed on a September 1992 CBS-TV special "Women in Country". However, the condition of her vocal cords had deteriorated to the point that medicine was ineffective, and surgery was necessary in order for her to continue her career. On October 21, she had the surgery. After a nine-week recovery period, she and her husband/producer Emory Gordy Jr. returned to the recording studio to resume what recording sessions they had finished in the previous autumn. Due to her surgery, the tone of her voice had changed, and all of the material she had recorded during that time period had to be re-recorded. The first song Loveless re-recorded was "You Will."

"You Will" charted for 23 weeks on the Billboard Hot Country Singles and Tracks chart, reaching #6 during the week of February 19, 1994.

== Chart positions ==
Chart (1993–1994)	Peak position
Canada Country Singles (RPM)	48
US Hot Country Songs (Billboard)	6

=== Year-end charts ===
Chart (1994)	Position
US Country Songs (Billboard)	70
