= Mary Ann Kennedy (American singer) =

American country music songwriter

- Genres: Country
- Occupation: Singer-songwriter
- Instrument(s): Guitar, mandolin, Vocals, drums
- Years active: 1981–present
- Labels: Columbia (in Calamity Jane); IRS (in Kennedy Rose)
- Formerly of: Calamity Jane; Kennedy Rose

Mary Ann Kennedy is an American country music songwriter. In her career, she has been a member of the groups Calamity Jane and Kennedy Rose, both times pairing with fellow songwriter Pam Rose. Kennedy's co-writing credits include the Grammy Award-nominated songs "Ring on Her Finger, Time on Her Hands" by Lee Greenwood and "I'll Still Be Loving You" by Restless Heart. Other songs that she has written include "Safe in the Arms of Love" by Martina McBride and "You Will" by Patty Loveless.

== Discography ==
- The Trail Less Traveled (2000)
- Hoofbeats, Heartbeats & Wings (2005)
- The Rhythm of the Ride (2009)

== Chart Singles Written by Mary Ann Kennedy ==
The following is a list of Mary Ann Kennedy compositions that were chart hits.

Year	Single Title	Recording Artist	Chart Positions		
Year	Single Title	Recording Artist	Billboard Hot 100	Billboard AC	Billboard Country
1980	He Gives Me Diamonds, You Give Me Chills co-written with Don Goodman	Margo Smith			52
1982	Ring on Her Finger, Time on Her Hands co-written with Don Goodman & Pam Rose	Lee Greenwood			5
1984	Me Against the Night co-written with Pat Bunch & Pam Rose	Crystal Gayle			4
1985	Dixie Road co-written with Don Goodman, Pat Bunch & Pam Rose	Lee Greenwood			1
1985	The First Word in Memory Is Me co-written with Pat Bunch & Pam Rose	Janie Fricke			7
1985	Somebody Else's Fire co-written with Pat Bunch & Pam Rose	Janie Fricke			4
1987	I'll Still Be Loving You co-written with Pat Bunch, Todd Cerney & Pam Rose	Restless Heart	33	3	1
1987	He's Letting Go co-written with Pat Bunch & Pam Rose	Baillie & the Boys			18
1993	You Will co-written with Randy Sharp & Pam Rose	Patty Loveless			6
1995	Love Like This co-written with Pat Bunch & Pam Rose	Carlene Carter			70
1995	Safe in the Arms of Love co-written with Pat Bunch & Pam Rose	Martina McBride			4
1995	Ring on Her Finger, Time on Her Hands co-written with Don Goodman & Pam Rose	Reba McEntire			9
