= Pam Rose =

American country music songwriter

- Origin: Chattanooga, Tennessee, United States
- Genres: Country
- Occupation: Singer-songwriter
- Instrument(s): Guitar, keyboards, Vocals
- Years active: 1977–present
- Labels: Epic; Capitol (solo); Columbia (in Calamity Jane); IRS (in Kennedy Rose)
- Formerly of: Calamity Jane; Kennedy Rose

Pam Rose is an American country music songwriter. In her career, she has been a member of the groups Calamity Jane and Kennedy Rose, both times pairing with fellow songwriter Mary Ann Kennedy. Rose's co-writing credits include the Grammy Award-nominated songs "Ring on Her Finger, Time on Her Hands" by Lee Greenwood and "I'll Still Be Loving You" by Restless Heart. Other songs that she has written include "Safe in the Arms of Love" by Martina McBride and "You Will" by Patty Loveless.

She has also worked with songwriting for Swedish country singer Jill Johnson.

== Discography ==
Albums

| Title | Album details |
|---|---|
| Pam Rose | Release date: 1977; Label: Capitol Records; Format: LP |
| Morpheus (as Pamela Rose) | Release date: 2004; Label: Grace Records; Format: CD |
| Sacred Song | Release date: 2021; Label: Grace Records; Format: CD |

Singles

| Year | Single | US Country | Album |
|---|---|---|---|
| 1977 | "Midnight Flight" | 83 | Pam Rose |
| 1977 | "Runaway Heart" | 93 | Pam Rose |
| 1980 | "It's Not Supposed to Be That Way" | 52 | — |
| 1980 | "I'm Not Through Loving You Yet" | 60 | — |

== Chart Singles Written by Pam Rose ==
The following is a list of Pam Rose compositions that were chart hits.

| Year | Single Title | Recording Artist | Chart Positions | | |
| Year | Single Title | Recording Artist | Billboard Hot 100 | Billboard AC | Billboard Country |
|---|---|---|---|---|---|
| 1982 | Ring on Her Finger, Time on Her Hands co-written with Don Goodman & Mary Ann Kennedy | Lee Greenwood | | | 5 |
| 1984 | Me Against the Night co-written with Pat Bunch & Mary Ann Kennedy | Crystal Gayle | | | 4 |
| 1985 | Dixie Road co-written with Don Goodman, Pat Bunch & Mary Ann Kennedy | Lee Greenwood | | | 1 |
| 1985 | The First Word in Memory Is Me co-written with Pat Bunch & Mary Ann Kennedy | Janie Fricke | | | 7 |
| 1985 | Somebody Else's Fire co-written with Pat Bunch & Mary Ann Kennedy | Janie Fricke | | | 4 |
| 1987 | I'll Still Be Loving You co-written with Pat Bunch, Todd Cerney & Mary Ann Kennedy | Restless Heart | 33 | 3 | 1 |
| 1987 | He's Letting Go co-written with Pat Bunch & Mary Ann Kennedy | Baillie & the Boys | | | 18 |
| 1993 | You Will co-written with Randy Sharp & Mary Ann Kennedy | Patty Loveless | | | 6 |
| 1995 | Love Like This co-written with Pat Bunch & Mary Ann Kennedy | Carlene Carter | | | 70 |
| 1995 | Safe in the Arms of Love co-written with Pat Bunch & Mary Ann Kennedy | Martina McBride | | | 4 |
| 1996 | Faithfully co-written with Chuck Jones | Peter Cetera | | 13 | |
| 1995 | Ring on Her Finger, Time on Her Hands co-written with Don Goodman & Mary Ann Kennedy | Reba McEntire | | | 9 |
