= Scott MacIntyre =

American singer-songwriter

- Born: Scott Douglas MacIntyre; June 22, 1985 (age 40); Redondo Beach, California, U.S.
- Origin: Scottsdale, Arizona, U.S.
- Genres: Classical, soft rock, pop
- Occupations: Singer-songwriter, instrumentalist, producer
- Instruments: Vocals, piano, guitar, bass guitar
- Years active: 1996–present
- Formerly of: MacIntyre Family Singers; The Glutes
- Website: www.scottmacintyre.com

Scott Douglas MacIntyre (born June 22, 1985) is an American singer, songwriter, and pianist, and the eighth place finalist on the eighth season of American Idol. MacIntyre is visually impaired, and while not completely blind, he has tunnel vision and has only a two-percent field of vision, both due to Leber's congenital amaurosis.

== Personal life ==
MacIntyre was born in Redondo Beach, California to Douglas R. and Carole C. (Williams) MacIntyre and has a younger brother, Todd (born 1988) and a younger sister, Katelyn (born 1991). MacIntyre started playing the piano by ear when he was three years old. He was taught by a neighborhood piano teacher near their home in Redondo Beach, California. At six years of age, he began training in classical music. When Scott turned 10, the family moved to Toronto, Ontario, Canada. They lived there for four years, and in that time Scott studied at the Royal Conservatory of Music. The MacIntyre family then relocated to Arizona and Scott studied under Walter Cosand, a university professor of Arizona State University. He was home-schooled until the age of 14, when he was admitted into Arizona State University's Barrett Honors College and Herberger College of the Arts. Scott won the 2004 Arizona Young Artists Competition at Herberger Theater in the vocal division. In 2005, USA Today named him one of its twenty College Academic All-Stars and he was offered Marshall and Fulbright scholarships. Also in 2005, MacIntyre performed as a guest soloist with the Phoenix Symphony. The same year, MacIntyre was diagnosed with kidney disease and in November 2006, he had to spend ten months undergoing dialysis, severely hampering his capacity to perform and travel. In 2007 on August 22, Walter Cosand's wife Patricia donated her kidney to MacIntyre, which saved his life.

He graduated from Arizona State University with a degree in Piano Performance in 2005, and he was received in the White House by Laura Bush as one of the RFB&D (Recording for the Blind and Dyslexic) scholarship winners in 2006. He obtained his master's degree of Performance Studies at Royal Holloway, University of London and the Royal College of Music, where he studied on the Marshall Scholarship, one of the most competitive scholarships in the United States, awarded to only 40 American students each year.

After his successful run on American Idol, he began dating childhood friend Christina Teich at the end of 2009. In February 2011, the two announced their engagement in People magazine and were married on August 18, 2011, in Scottsdale, Arizona.

In 2014, MacIntyre was put back on the waiting list for a second kidney transplant, and the following year he received a kidney from an anonymous living-donor. After the successful surgery, he met his kidney donor, Misty, at Vanderbilt University Medical Center.

== American Idol ==
=== Overview ===
MacIntyre auditioned for the eighth season of American Idol in Phoenix, Arizona. He is the first visually impaired finalist on the show. MacIntyre was eliminated on April 8, 2009, and came in eighth place. MacIntyre was scheduled to perform during the Season 8 Finale with special guest Billy Joel, but the performance was scrapped after Joel unexpectedly cancelled. He performed on the American Idols LIVE! Tour 2009 featuring the Top 10 finalists.

=== Performances and results ===
Week #	Theme	Song choice	Original artist	Order #	Result
Audition	N/A	"And So It Goes"	Billy Joel	N/A	Advanced
Hollywood	First Solo	[not aired]	-	N/A	Advanced
Hollywood	Group Performance	[not aired]	-	N/A	Advanced
Hollywood	Second Solo	"Home"	Daughtry	N/A	Advanced
Top 36/Semi-Final 3	Billboard Hot 100 Hits to Date	"Mandolin Rain"	Bruce Hornsby and the Range	9	Advanced
Top 13	Michael Jackson	"Keep the Faith"	Michael Jackson	2	Safe
Top 11	Grand Ole Opry	"Wild Angels"	Martina McBride	6	Safe
Top 10	Motown	"You Can't Hurry Love"	The Supremes	3	Bottom 3^{1}
Top 9	Top Downloads	"Just the Way You Are"	Billy Joel	5	Safe
Top 8	Year They Were Born	"The Search Is Over"	Survivor	5	Eliminated

- ^Note 1 MacIntyre was saved first from elimination.

== Career ==
MacIntyre released many albums before becoming a finalist of American Idol. He produced his first CD when he was eleven, and he has recorded several more CDs since then spanning genres from classical to pop.

In 2000, at the age of 15, he made his orchestral debut performing with the Phoenix Symphony as a guest piano soloist. In 2002 he competed in, and won, the Butterfield Young Artist Competition at ASU. He also won the VSA Arts 2008 Young Soloists Award.

MacIntyre released a post-Idol Christmas EP "Christmas Angel" to iTunes in 2009, and the title track became a top indie holiday radio single in the US. His first full-length post-Idol album, Heartstrings was released on March 11, 2010, to MacIntyre's web site and to digital retailers. Scott performed on American Idol on March 11 to promote his album. This album was re-released in 2012 with new original bonus tracks including "I Am Hope" which became an anthem for the organ donation community and one of MacIntyre's most popular songs.

In April 2012 MacIntyre released his first book, By Faith, Not By Sight, with Nashville-based publisher Thomas Nelson. The memoir chronicles the challenges of growing up blind, learning to play the piano, and dealing with an unexpected illness that almost took his life before he ever competed on the popular reality show. The book is available on Amazon, Walmart, and Barnes and Noble.

In August 2013 Scott launched a Kickstarter campaign that raised almost 40k for his album, "Lighthouse," which would release the following year.

In November 2013 Scott released his first full-length Christmas album, Christmas in Paris. The album features twelve tracks including ten arrangements of traditional holiday songs and two original songs, "Christmas Angel," written by MacIntyre and "Christmas in Paris," written by MacIntyre, Aaron Steenhoven and Ryan Hydro.

Following the release of "Lighthouse," MacIntyre wrote the theme song for the feature film, "If I Had Wings," about a blind teen who wants to run track and field. The music video for the song features footage from the film.

In 2020, MacIntyre and his wife produced a television special entitled "Enduring Hope" which aired internationally and surpassed 1 million viewers in 2023. The couple also launched a companion devotional podcast of the same name. MacIntyre and his wife founded Scott Macintyre Ministries. MacIntyre started a non-profit organization, SongSight, music mentoring for the blind.

== Discography ==
=== Classical albums ===
- 1997 – Seeing Through Sound at Eleven
- 1999 – Brothers for all Seasons
- 2000 – Grand Classics

=== Pop albums ===
- 2003 – My Guarantee
- 2006 – Somewhere Else
- 2010 – Heartstrings
- 2012 – Heartstrings w/ bonus tracks
- 2013 – Christmas in Paris
- 2014 – Lighthouse
- 2021 – Enduring Hope

=== Collaborations ===
- 2005 – MacIntyre Family Singers (with the MacIntyre family)
- 2008 – Ripped (with brother Todd in the band "The Glutes")

=== EPs ===
- 2009 – View From Above
- 2009 – Christmas Angel
- 2017 – Hope Is Rising

=== Singles ===
- 2011 – I Wanna Be There
- 2016 – Emmanuel
- 2018 – Look Up!

== Awards and nominations ==
Year	Presenter	Award	Result
2009	Teen Choice Awards	Choice Summer Tour (shared with American Idol Top 10)	Nominated
