= Buddy (magazine) =

Music magazine, free, serving North Texas

Buddy Magazine

- Buddy cover, Vol. 47, No. 2, August 2019; Terri Hendrix on the cover Mike Junior Clark on the cover inset
- Editor: Rob Garner
- Former editors: Ron McKeown, Kirby Warnock, Stoney Burns
- Staff writers: Chuck Flores, Kate Stow, Andrew Daly, Ian Saint, George Gimarc, Rob Garner, Elaine MacAfee Bender, Rick Koster, George Bond, Carly May Gravley, Hannah Means Shannon
- Photographer: Chuck Flores, Robert C. Maxfield II, Andrew Sherman, Travis Clark
- Categories: Music: Rock 'n' roll Blues; Progressive country Pop
- Frequency: Monthly
- Format: Print; Digital; Mobile device
- Publisher: Rob Garner
- Founder: Stoney Burns, Rob Edleson
- Founded: July 1973
- First issue: July 1, 1973; 52 years ago
- Company: Buddy Magazine, LLC
- Country: United States
- Based in: Garland, Texas
- Language: English
- Website: buddymagazine.com
- ISSN: 0192-9097
- OCLC: 52985380

Buddy is a free monthly music magazine serving the North Texas and Northeast Texas regions. It was first published in Dallas, Texas, in July, 1973 as a free monthly. Stoney Burns (pseudonym of Brent Lasalle Stein; 1942–2011) and Rob Edleson (né Lewis Robin Edleson; born 1946) were the founders. The magazine's name is a tribute to Buddy Holly (1936–1959), who Burns said "changed my life". Buddy is described as a rock music magazine but, from its beginning, has included news and feature articles about performing artists and events of other genres, namely Texas progressive country, blues, jazz, folk, punk, and garage band music.

== History ==
Stoney Burns, before co-founding Buddy, published and edited Dallas Notes from 1967 to 1970, an underground bi-weekly newspaper. Christopher Gray of the Austin Chronicle, in 2000, likened Buddy as "the North Texas equivalent of Crawdaddy. Gray later wrote that writers for Buddy magazine who covered the blues scene in the Dallas-Fort Worth area helped resurrect the career of Zuzu Bollin and introduced mainstream music fans to notable regional blues artists, including jazz guitarist Roger Boykin (né Roger Mitchell Boykin; born 1940) and blues singer R.L. Griffin (aka "Fat Daddy;" né Raymond Lewis Griffin; born 1939) and the late pianist Boston Smith, brother of Buster Smith. At its peak, Buddy published editions in Dallas, Houston, and Austin/San Antonio and had a staff of almost two dozen.

Please address all correspondence, love letters, hate mail, records, threats, photos, unsolicited manuscripts, payola, etc., to Buddy Magazine ... Buddy is copyrighted, but we're not fanatics about it. Write us and we'll give you permission to reprint just about anything you want. ... If your regular distribution spot runs out of magazines before you get yours, let us know and we'll print up an extra copy next time.

— Statement in the masthead of a 1976 Houston edition, by Stoney Burns, editor and publisher.

There was no such thing as a music magazine. There was no Dallas Observer. There was no Guide in the Dallas Morning News. There was no place to learn about concerts and who was playing where. When we began writing, the musicians loved us and jumped right in to support us.

— Ron McKeown, 2018, WFAA-TV (online)

Early notable issues included "The Bob Dylan Story", "Plus Kinky Friedman All Star ^{✡} Issue" (as featured on the cover), January 1974. Buddy chronicled many performing artists before the emergence of their first albums, including, in 1975, Ray Wylie Hubbard, who was already popular as a Texas progressive country artist. That same year (1975), KAFM radio host Chuck Dunaway reported that Buddy, with a circulation of 40,000, was helping spread the positive aspects of progressive country. In 1977, 1978, Buddy was affiliated with KZEW-FM (a Dallas radio station known from 1973 to 1989 as "The Zoo"). By 1979, KTXQ took over Buddy, which had a circulation of 100,000. In 1982, Buddy was the official magazine of the Texxas Jam, a rock festival held at the Cotton Bowl in Dallas. Beginning around 1982, Buddy was issued in tabloid size and format.

== Selected personnel ==
=== Writers ===
- Chuck Flores (né Charles Anthony Flores; born 1955) has been a photojournalist and music journalist since 1975. He is also a musician. Flores has been assistant editor with Buddy since 1989.
- Ian Saint (pseudonym of Ian Geoffrey Sater; born 1987).
- Andrew Daly.
- Elaine MacAfee Bender.
- Tom Geddie (né Tommy Maurice Geddie; born 1946).
- Colleen (Bradford) Gilson.
- Shawn D. Henderson.
- George Bond.
- Rick Koster (Richard Koster; born 1955) wrote his first article, professionally, for Buddy in 1978. It was about Sammy Hagar. In 1998, St. Martin's Press published his book, Texas Music. As of 1997, Koster has been writing for The Day in New London, Connecticut.
- Tim Schuller (1949–2012)
- Kirby Warnock (né Kirby Franklin Warnock; born 1952); editor from 1976 to 1982.
- Jan Sikes (né Janice Kay Smith; born 1951).
- Jackie Don Loe (born 1965).
- Rob Garner (né Robert Steven Garner; born 1968), current publisher of Buddy, as of 2023 (see section below → § Hiatus and revival).
- Mary Jane Farmer (né Mary Jane Ewing; born 1940), reporter for Buddy from February 2013 to present.
- Kim Martin (née Kimberly Ann Richter; born 1950) – currently a Dallas freelance writer known as Kim Pierce – notably a food critic, healthy eating activist, and Texas cuisine writer; and, ironically (regarding healthy eating), author of the chicken-fried steak entry for the 2007 book, the Oxford Companion to American Food and Drink. p. 114 – via Internet Archive.
- Lisa Rollins (PhD) (née Lisa Lynette Rollins; 1965–2014) contributed to a feature, "Spotlight on Performers."
- Kathleen Hudson, PhD (née Kathleen Ann Pillow; born 1945) won an award in 1989 from the Texas Press Women's Communication for her story, "You're Gonna Make It After All: Sonny Curtis" (Sonny Curtis). An academic in higher education and freelance writer, Hudson was the founding executive director in 1987 of the Texas Heritage Music Foundation in Kerrville, and served in that position until 2001.
- Joe Nick Patoski (né Nicholas Joseph Patoski; born 1951), who, on November 16, 1980, in Austin, married Kris Cummings, keyboardist with Joe Carrasco. Kris was a 1981 inductee of Buddy Magazine's Texas Tornado List (see below).

=== Selected writers who started with Buddy in 1973 ===
- Stoney Burns
- Rob Edleson (né Lewis Robin Edleson; born 1946)
- Steve Brooks (né Charles Stephen Brooks; born 1949) (graphic artist)
- Ronald McKeown (né Ronald Houston McKeown; 1946–2024) (editor)
- Jesus D. Carrillo (né Jesus Domingo Carrillo; born 1952), photojournalist

== Selected videography ==
- When Dallas Rocked (2013): 64 minute documentary – interviews, photos, and commentary from the people who were there and lived through the heyday of the Dallas rock n roll music scene – during the 1970s and 1980s. Produced by Kirby Warnock, former Buddy magazine editor. Warnock narrates.

== Texas Tornado List ==
The Texas Tornado List, billed as "The greatest players in Texas. Perhaps in the world", is an annual hall of fame roster, since 1978, listing the top musicians in Texas. The name, Texas Tornados, is also the name of a band founded by 1986 Texas Tornado inductee, Doug Sahm.

1978:	Rocky Athas (fr) (né Rocky Dino Athas; born 1954) • Billy Gibbons • Bugs Henderson • Eric Johnson • John Nitzinger • Jimmie Vaughan
1979:	Rocky Hill, Stevie Ray Vaughan
1980:	Sumter Bruton (né Thomas Sumter Bruton; born 1944) (guitar), Alan Haynes, Mark Pollock (né Mark Thomas Pollock; 1951–2015) (guitar), Slim Richey, Ronnie "Mouse" Weiss (né Ronald Lon Weiss; born 1942) (vocals/guitar)
1981:	Freddie Cisneros (né Alfred Cisneros; born 1947) (guitar), Pat Coil (né Patrick Cullen Coil; born 1954) (keyboards), Kris Cummings (née Kristine Anne Cummings; born 1951) (keyboards), Anson Funderburgh, Ezra Charles (Charles Helpinstill), Dusty Hill, Alex Napier (aka "Mr. Blue"; né Miles Alexander Napier; 1951–2011) (bass), Willie Nelson, David Stanley (né Samuel David Stanley; born 1946) (bass), Steve Williams, Wally Wilson
1982:	Jim Alderman • Frank Beard • Billy Block • Louis Brousar • Jack Calmes • Michael "Junior" Clark • Fred Crain • Joe Don Davidson • Kim Davis • Stevie Davis • Michael DeBaise • Randall Dollahan • Red Garland (jazz pianist) • Bobbie Gentry • Mickey Gilley • Barbara Graham • Buzzy Gruen • Bud Guin • Keith Karnaky • Pee Wee Lynn • Herman Matthews • Whistlin' Alex Moore • Tommy Morrell • Bobbie Nelson • Dahrell Norris • Jim Raycraft • Connie Schlig • Jimmy Don Smith • Whitey Thomas • Ron Thompson • Jimmy Wallace (né James Michael Wallace; born 1954) (guitar) • Linda Waring • Larry White
1983:	Lou "Lazer" Bovis • Doyle Bramhall • Steven Bruton (né Turner Stephen Bruton; 1948–2009) (guitar) • Mike Buck • Johnny Carroll • Dennis Cavalier • Jim Colgrove • Toby Davis • Randy DeHart • Lynn Groom • Paul Guerrero (né Paulins Guerrero, Jr.; born 1931) (drums) • Joel Guzman • Frank Hames • Brian Heinsohn • David Hill • Rick Jackson • Flaco Jimenez • Louis Johnson • Steve Jordan • Chris Layton • Rusty Lewis • Barbara Lynn • Bill Maddox (de) (né William Leslie Maddox; 1953–1910) (drums) • Ken "Big Nardo" Murray (drums) • George Rains • Leon Rausch • Jeff Sellers • Charlie Sexton • Walter Shannon • Craig Simecheck • Lewis W. Stephens • Jas Stephens • Uncle John Turner
1984:	Rob Alexander • Terry Anglin (Jack Anglin's son) • Lee S. Appleman • Louis "Johnny Fixx" Baldovin • Marcia Ball • Karl Berkebile • John Bryant • Albert Collins • Johnny "Rosebud" Dowdy • Omar Dykes • Keith Ferguson • Craig Green • Bonnie Hearne • Craig LeMay • Bert Ligon • Rene Martinez • Paul Matson • Leon McAuliffe • Brian Mendelsohn • Ray Mendias • Smokey Montgomery • Tommy Nuckols • James Pennybaker • Brian Piper • Chuck Rainey • Terry Ranson • Billy Sanders • Jim Shelly • Al Stricklin • Robin Syler • Tim Wheeler
1985:	Michael Bartula • Ray Benson • Little Joe Blue • Ponty Bone • Roger Boykin • Sarah Brown • Bobby Chitwood • Dave Clark • Michael Clay • Van Cliburn • Danny Cochran • Pee Wee Crayton • Steve Davison • Ronnie Dawson • W.R. "Tony" Dukes • Cornell Dupree • Denny Freeman • Fred Hoey • Mike Kennedy • Smokin' Joe Kubek • Steve Langdon • Charlie Lowe • Jim Milan • Gabriel Saucedo • Rollo Smith • Andy Stone • Eric Stuer • Johnny "Guitar" Watson • Mike Webster • U.P. Wilson
1986:	Mel Brown • Johnny "Clyde" Copeland • Randy Drake • Ernie Durawa • Mike Gallaher • Ty Grimes (drums) • Jim "Horton Heat" Heath • Dave Hughlett • Ronald Shannon Jackson • Santiago Jimenez, Jr. (accordion) • Kenney Dale Johnson • Wade Johnson (né Wade Paul Johnson; born 1950) (drums) • Jackie King • Steady Freddy Krc (né Alfred Edward Krc; born 1954) • Jerry LeCroix • Augie Meyers • Stan Moore • Gary P. Nunn • Joe Ruggiero • Patrice Rushen • Doug Sahm • Joe Sample • Eric Tagg • Richard Theisen • Red Young
1987:	Terry Blankenship • Roger Boykin • W.C. Clark • Bobby Dennis • Paul English • Randy Fouts • Mike Gage • Joel Harlan • Brad Houser • Jeff Howe • Johnny Marshall • Mouse Mayes • Delbert McClinton • Sam Myers • Darrell Nulisch • Newell Oler • Paul Orta • Gary Pelfrey • Gary Primich • Mickey Raphael • Rick "Casper" Rawls • William Richardson • Ted Roddy • Robert Clayton Sanders • Rhandy Simmons • Texas Slim Sullivan • Miss Inez Teddlie (1911–2002) • Craig Wallace • Kim Wilson
1988:	Tim Alexander • Jack Barton • Jimmy Carl Black • Charles Brown • Herbie Cowans • Carl Finch • Frosty • B'Nois King • Don Leady • Joe McBride • Kim Platko • Mike Schwedler • Bill Swicegood • Al Trick • Fredde "Pharoh" Walden
1989:	Kevin Afflack • Marc Benno • Robin Hood Brians • Mike "Spunky" Brunone • Alex Camp • Joe Coronado • Lavada Durst • Harold Evans • Gene Glover • Claude Johnson • Derek O'Brien (blues guitar) • Bill Payne • Paul Pearcy • Jim Suhler
1990:	Maurice Anderson • Mike Arnold • Ronnie Bramhall • Jeannette Brantley • Phil Campbell • Randy Cates • Ron Dilulio • Bill Ham • Michael Hamilton • Earl Harvin • John Inmon • Michael Medina • Ruff Rufner • Wayne Six • J. Paul Slavens • Ron Snider • Matt Tapp • Buddy Whittington • Dan Wojciechowski
1991:	Darryl "Dime" Abbott • Josh Alan • James Anderson • Gregg Bissonette (drummer) • Matt Chamberlain (drummer) • Mark Geary • Gerry Gibson • Tim Grugle • Dan Haerle • Steve Hill • Chris Hunter • Mitch Marine (drums) • Rex "Moon" Mauney • Andy Michlin • Ian Moore • Tommy Shannon • Steve Sonday • Andy Timmons • Kenny Withrow
1992:	Dave Abbruzzese • Jim Cocke • Ted Cruz • Mike Daane • Mike Dunn • Mike Fiala • Jay Gillian • Ricky Lynn Gregg • Mike Kindred • Guthrie Kinnard • Chad Lovel • Martin McCall • Kelly McNulty • Jason Moeller • Buddy Mohmed • Mike Morgan • Ray Pollard • Jimmy R. Rusidoff • Mike Scaccia • Derek Speigner (drums) • Jimbo Wallace • Kinley "Barney" Wolfe • Jason Wolford • Alan Wooley • Tommy Young

1993:	Vinnie Abbott • Miguel Antonio • Bobby Baranowski • Jeffrey Barnes • Pat "Taz" Bently • Chris Broadhurst • Brian "Hash Brown" Calway • James Clay • Ornette Coleman • Aaron Comess • Chris Craig • Roy Hargrove • Marchel Ivery • Barry Kooda • Peter Austin Lee • Sam McCall • David "Fathead" Newman • Casey Orr • Andy Owens • Calvin Owens • Shawn Phares • Carlton Powell • Johnny Reno (né Lindy Lloyd Barger; born 1951) (saxophone) • Rick Rigsby (bass) • Peter Schmidt • Ken Stock • Phil Taylor • Bill Tillman • Ronnie Wilson
1994:	Rex Brown • George Dimitri • Donny Ray Ford • Fred Gleber • Michael Jerome • Matthew E. Johnson • David Lee Joyner • Robby LeDoux • David Milsap • Terry-Groff Montgomery • David Mora • Paul Quigg • Brett Reid • Robert Schietroma (percussionist) • Keith Traquair • Brian Wakeland
1995:	Bruce Alford • Scott Arndt • Bobby Boatright (fiddle player) • Junior Brown • Johnny Case • Milo Deering • Alan Emert • Wilson Fisher • Mike Graff • Frank Hailey • Hal Harris • Kim Herriage • Matt Hillyer (guitar)• Gary Hogue • Cindy Horstman • Billy King • Johnnie Red Latham • Dave Palmer (keyboardist) • Lisa Pankratz • Drew Phelps (bassist) • Darrell Phillips • Michael Price • Henry Qualls • Mike Querry • Bobby Rambo • Reggie Rueffer (fiddle) • Kevin Schermerhorn • Jeff Scroggins • John Scully • Kevin Smith • Matt Snow • Richie Vasquez (drummer) • Scott White • Scott Whitfield (trombonist) • Ted Wood • Dave Zoller
1996:	Gene Coleman • Sonnie Collie • John Fiveash (drummer/percussionist) • Donnie Gillyand • David Grissom (guitarist) • Murray Hammond • Bubba Hernandez • Andrew "Jr. Boy" Jones (guitarist) • Jamie McLester • Jamal Mohamed • Ernie Myers • Lee Roy Parnell • Clay Pendergrass (guitarist) • Chad Rueffer (guitar) • Fred Rush • Chris Skiles • Kenny Stern • Lisa Umbargar • Van Wilks
1997:	Mark Austin • Steve Berg • Joe Cripps • Mary Cutrufello • Floyd Domino • John Garza • Chris Gipson • John Thomas Griffith • Tommy Hill • Tommy Hyatt • Will Johnson • Rick Koster • S.P. Leary (1930–1998) (blues drummer) • Ron Mason • Mike McCullough • Riley Osbourn • Lucky Peterson • Pat Peterson • Doug Pinnick • Steve Powell • Bill Randolph • Ed Soph • Clint Strong • Marvin E. Washington, Jr.
1998:	John Arbour • Doyle Bramhall II • David Burns • Floyd Dixon • Danny Duncan • Big Al DuPree (né Alfred William Dupree, Jr.; 1923–2004) • David Fargason (bassist) • Juevey Gomez • Chuck Hasley • Paul Hollis • Keith Jones • Tutu Jones • Todd Lewis • Bob Livingston • Bobby Patterson • Jimmy Pendleton • Lucky Peterson • Rich Thomas • Terry • Ware • Danny Wright
	Two-year hiatus
2001:	Richard Chalk • Tom Faulkner • Randy Garabay (né Ramiro Beltrán Garibay; 1939–2002) (guitar) • Dave Hineman • Lewis Hutcheson • Brady Mosher • Gary Myrick • Eddy Shaver • Holland K. Smith • Clark Vogeler
2002:	John Adams • Ronny Ellis • George Fuller • Robby Garner • Fred Hamilton (guitar, bass, composer; Professor Emeritus University of North Texas College of Music) • Mace Maben • Jon Mastin • Phil McNeese • Blake Milton • Kenny Traylor • Ken Wheeler
	One-year hiatus
2004:	Ken Bethea • Nick Curran • Todd Parsnow (né Todd Edward Parsnow; born 1970) (guitar) • Cookie McGee (née Carmen Yvonne McGee; born 1957) (left-handed guitarist, vocalist, pianist) • John Sprott (né John Hunter Sprott; born 1958) (guitar)
2005:	Pete Coatney (né Pete Allen Coatney; born 1963) (drummer) • Doug Howard • Jimmy Morgan • Jason Thomas
	Nine-year hiatus Henceforth, guitar and bass guitar, only
2015:	Christopher Alexander • John Carroll • Jerry Don Branch • Gary Clark, Jr. • Chris Claridy • Jason Elmore (guitar) • Glenn Fukunaga • Lance Lopez (guitar) • Marty Muse
2016:	Rich Brotherton (né Richard Lenz Brotherton; born 1959) (guitar) • Quinten Hope • Devin Leigh • Jackie Don Loe • Danny Sanches • Ray Sharpe • Johnny Winter
2017:	Will Owen Gage (né William Chapin Owen-Gage; born 1987) (guitar) • Wes Jeans (né Michael Wesley Jeans; born 1981) (guitar) • Mark Lettieri (guitar; notably with Snarky Puppy) • Tommy Nash (né Thomas Farrel Nash; born 1950) (guitar)
2018:	Kyle Brock (né Kyle Glen Brock; born 1951) (bass) • Aden Bubeck (né Aden Steed Bubeck; born 1972) (bass) • Rhett Butler • Jesse Dayton (guitar) • Casey James (guitar) • Kirby Kelley (né Kirby Olin Kelley; born 1959) (guitar) • Dennis Ludiker
2019:	Butch Bonnor (né Floyd Charles Bonner; born 1953) (guitar) • Tyler Bryant (guitar) • James Hinkle (né James Edward Hinkle; born 1957) (guitar) • Michael Lee (né Michael Lee Clemmer; born 1988) (guitar) • Lloyd Maines (guitar)
2022:	Pat Boyack (guitar) • Emily Elbert (guitar) • Christopher Holt (guitar) • Chris McQueen (guitar) • Wes Stephenson (bass) • Braylon Lacy (bass) • Monte Pittman (guitar) • Neil Swanson (guitar) • Ally Venable (guitar) • Mitch Watkins (guitar) • James Driscoll (bass) • Duane Heggar (bass) • Chris Maresh (bass)

=== Texas Harmonica Tornados ===
The "Texas Harmonica Tornados" were leading Texas harmonica players recognized by Buddy Magazine from about 1984 through 1987. In 1985, Rich Layton (see Rock Romano), known as "The Duke of Juke," was named Texas Harmonica Tornado. Peer Texas Harmonica Tornados include Kim Wilson, Delbert McClinton, and Paul Orta (1957–2019), who was inducted in 1987.

== Buddy's Music Hall of Fame ==
1979:	Tex Ritter
1980:	Lightnin' Hopkins (the award was accepted by María Elena Holly, Buddy's widow, and country swing pioneer, Leon Rausch)
1981:	Roy Orbison
1984:	Jimmy Dean

== Buddy's Texas Music Awards ==
Buddy's Texas Music Awards ("The Buddies") is an annual readers poll survey that debuted 1973. The awards were presented at a black-tie event. The new act categories are chosen by music journalists.

1973:
(1st)
Country: Willie Nelson
1974:
(2nd)
Country: Willie Nelson • Waylon Jennings (2nd place)
Pop: ZZ Top • Jerry Jeff Walker
1975:
(3rd)
Country: Willie Nelson • Asleep at the Wheel (2nd place) • Kris Kristofferson (4th place)
Pop: ZZ Top • Jerry Jeff Walker (2nd) • Michael Martin Murphey (3rd) • Rusty Wier (4th)
1979:
(6th)
Country: Waylon Jennings

Pop/rock: ZZ Top
Latin: Joe Carrasco
Blues/soul/jazz: One O'Clock Lab Band
Album: Bat Out of Hell
Song: "Mammas Don't Let Your Babies Grow Up to Be Cowboys"
New pop group: Mother of Pearl (Note: Mother of Pearl, an Austin band: Jerrie Jo Jones (Jerrie Thompson), R&B vocals Ernie Gammage (né Troupe Earnest Gammage III; born 1944), bass and R&B vocals Johnny Richardson, lead guitar, replaced in 1979 by Al Bettis Layton DePenning (né Layton Allen DePenning; born 1947), guitar and vocals Donald Ray Fischer (born 1952), drums and vocals Jones, Richardson, Gammage, and DePenning had been members of Plum Nelly)
New rock artists: Kenny and the Kasuals
New country artist: Joe Ely

J. Boy Adams, hosted the ceremony which was broadcast live on KZEW, March 11, 1979
1980:
(7th)
Country: Willie Nelson

Pop/rock: ZZ Top
Blues/soul/jazz: Bugs Henderson
Album: Degüello
New country artist: Whiskey Drinkin' Music (Austin)

Ray Wylie Hubbard hosted the ceremony at Longhorn Ballroom March 18, 1980
1981:
(8th)
Country: Willie Nelson

Pop/rock: ZZ Top
Latin: Little Joe, Johnny y La Familia
Blues/soul: The Fabulous Thunderbirds
Jazz: One O'Clock Lab Band
Album: The Hard Way, by Point Blank
Song: "Sailing", by Christopher Cross
Songwriter: Jerry Dirkx, "She's In Love With The Rolling Stones"
Critics choice, pop: Shake Russell-Dana Cooper Band
Critics choice, blues: Stevie Ray Vaughan & Double Trouble
Critics choice, pop: U.S. Kids (Note: U.S. Kids: Jim Zachery, rip Mike Schwedler (né Michael Edward Schwedler; born 1955), drums Steve Williams, bass Eddie Lowe, rip Don "Little Donnie Walkerbird" Walker, guitar virtuoso Dickey Ferguson, rip)

Brother Dave Gardner hosted the ceremony at the Wintergarden Ballroom in Dallas at 1616 John West Road, March 13, 1981
1984:
(11th)
Country: Asleep at the Wheel

Pop/rock: Joe Ely
Latin: Little Joe, Johnny y La Familia
Jazz: The Crusaders
Regional record: (tie) (i) Born to Blow, Johnny Reno and the Sax Maniacs; (ii) Drive This, Teddy Boys
Movie filmed in Texas: Terms of Endearment
Album: Eliminator, ZZ Top
Song: "Gimme All Your Lovin'", ZZ Top
Blues: Stevie Ray Vaughan
Video: Sharp Dressed Man, ZZ Top from the album Eliminator
New wave: Joe King Carrasco

Ray Wylie Hubbard hosted the ceremony at the Loew's Anatole May 9, 1984, in Dallas

== Hiatus and revival ==
In 2020, after forty-six years, eleven months of continuous publication, Buddy suspended operations amid the economic disruption caused by the COVID-19 pandemic. Its final regular monthly issue under publisher Ron McKeown appeared in March 2020, as the shutdown of live music venues and related advertising revenue created significant financial challenges for the magazine.

Publication resumed in September 2022 under new publisher Rob Garner (né Robert Steven Garner; born 1968), a Texas musician (bassist) and longtime reader of the magazine. For the restart, Garner collaborated with several former Buddy contributors and staff, including McKeown, all serving in an advisory capacities. Following its relaunch, Buddy adopted a hybrid publishing model, expanding its digital presence while issuing limited print editions rather than returning immediately to a monthly print schedule. In 2023, the magazine marked its 50th anniversary and began efforts to digitize its historical archive. Garner, from 1998 to 2003, played electric bass with the Josh Alan Band. Garner, in 2002, was named in Buddy's Texas Tornado List. He is also a music educator, including author of 1996 method book Essential Music Theory for Electric Bass (re-published 2007).

== Disambiguation ==
- Not to be confused with the South Korean LGBTQ magazine, Buddy, published in Seoul (from February 20, 1998, to Winter 2003); OCLC 613611725
- Not to be confused with the Buddy Potápění ("Buddy Diving"), a bi-monthly (every two months) published in Prague, founded July 2007 (issue No. 1) (buddymag.cz); ISSN 1805-3017

== Bibliography ==
=== References ===
- Austin Chronicle; Gray, Christopher (November 10, 2000). "Sad Stories and Steel Guitars – Tearjoint Troubador Ted Roddy's Country Soul".
- Beaumont Journal; Lightfoot, John Ewell, Jr. (1944–2001) (March 17, 1976). "Willie Nelson". "Country Music With Dr. John," column of John Lightfoot. Vol. 87, no. 120. p. 9 (section C). LCCN sn82-9; ISSN 0744-1207; OCLC 8046241 (all editions).
1. Via Newspapers.com (digital image 27).
2. Via Genealogy Bank (digital image 27).
Note: "Dr. John" was Lightfoot's newspaper byline for his column about country music. The nom de plume reflected his Ph.D. in English literature, which he earned from Texas Tech in September 1973.
- Billboard; Hall, Claude (November 8, 1975). "Dallas' KAFM Is Bigger than Texas These Days" (PDF). Vol. 87, no. 45. pp. 4, 22, 24 – via World Radio History; maintained by David Eduardo Frackelton Gleason (né David Frackelton Gleason; 1946), Cleveland.
- Buddy Magazine.
1. Slaughter, Jim (January 1974). "The Bob Dylan Story" (PDF) (cover story). Vol. 1, no. 7. pp. 12–15.
2. Ornish, Laurel Ann (January 1974). "Kinky Friedman All Star ✡ Issue" (PDF) (cover story). Vol. 1, no. 7. Photo by Danny Barsotti. pp. 16–18, 20, 30.
3. Pellecchia, Michael (May 1975). "Is What They Do in Denton Jazz?" (PDF) (cover story). Vol. 2, no. 11. Photo by Danny Barsotti. p. 21.
4. Miller, Ed (March 1975). "Past Meets Present at Longhorn – From Bob Wills in the '40s to Ray Wylie Hubbard in the '70s" (PDF). Vol. 2, no. 9. Photo of Dewey Groom by Ron McKeown (né Ronald Houston McKeown; 1946–2024). p. 15.
5. Michnoff, David (April 1975). "Dazed and Confused by Led Zep" (PDF). Vol. 2, no. 10. Postscript by Kim Martin (née Kimberly Ann Richter; born 1950, currently known as Kim Pierce); photo of Robert Plant performing by Ron McKeown. p. 22.
6. Deck: "Life at the top is everything you've always imagined ... down to the last limousine."
  Postscript by Kim Martin: "So it seems, I, too, experienced the police-orange camper-Led Zeppelin phenomena on Mockingbird. I was on assignment with photographer Jay Dickman for the Times Herald. Here's what all the mysterious limos and turnoffs and takeoffs mean ..."
7. "Buddy Texas Tornados Announced – Congratulations to the Buddy Texas Tornados of Guitar and Bass, Class of 2015" (PDF). Vol. 43. June 2015. p. 11. Archived from the original (PDF) on October 27, 2021.
8. "Buddy Texas Tornados – Congratulations to the Buddy Texas Tornados of Guitar, Class of 2017" (PDF). Vol. 44. April 2016. p. 10. Archived from the original (PDF) on October 27, 2021.
9. "Buddy Texas Tornados – Congratulations to the Buddy Texas Tornados of Guitar, Class of 2017" (PDF). Vol. 45. April 2017. p. 10. Archived from the original (PDF) on May 17, 2017.
10. Bellicose Bullfeather (pseudonym of Stoney Burnes; né Brent LaSalle Stein; born 1942) (July 2018). "Not Fade Away: Buddy Writers and Photographers Recorded the 1973 Kerrville Folk Festival, Willie’s First Fourth of July Picnic, the Texas Jam, the Rebirth of Deep Ellum and the Rise of Social Media" (PDF). p. 12.
11. Bellicose Bullfeather (September 2018). "What a Long Strange Trip – Buddy Magazine, Musicians with Heart Celebrate 45 Years of Chronicling Texas Music History" (PDF). Vol. 46, no. 3. Photo of Dewey Groom by Ron McKeown (né Ronald Houston McKeown; 1946–2024). p. 10. Archived from the original (PDF) on August 26, 2019.
- D Magazine. LCCN sn78-457; ISSN 0161-7826; OCLC 4020946 (all editions).
1. Warnock, Kirby Franklin (July 1, 1990). "Media: The Buddy System – Life at Dallas's First Rock Magazine Wasn't Just a Job – It Was an Attitude".
2. Warnock, Kirby Franklin (June 10, 2024). Dallas History: "My Wild Ride Through the '70s Music Scene in Dallas, Thanks to Buddy Magazine".
Deck: "Dallas was a different place back then, and with youth on my side, I survived an eight-year rock-and-roll odyssey by way of the iconoclastic publication that could never exist today."
- Focus Daily News; Holt, Jo Ann. "Dallas International Guitar Festival Hosts Benefit for Buddy Magazine".
- Garner, Robert S. (1968–) (1996) [2007; 1998]. Essential Music Theory for Electric Bass. Pacific, Missouri: Mel Bay Publications – via Google Books (limited preview). ISBN 978-1-6097-4656-8, 1-6097-4656-2, ISBN 978-0-7866-7736-8, 0-7866-7736-8; OCLC 1100912507 (all editions); OCLC 191809518 (all editions); OCLC 893705569 (all editions).
- International Radio Report (July 19, 1979). Hall, Claude (ed.). "Dallas–Ft. Worth Giants" (PDF). Vol. 2, no. 28. p. 6 – via World Radio History.
- Potts, Jackie (November 22, 2006) [updated July 28, 2016]. "Randy Garibay: The Chicano Bluesman of San Antonio". Handbook of Texas Online, Texas State Historical Association. p. 114 (hardcopy).
- WFAA (online); Harris, Byron (August 29, 2018) [updated August 30, 2018]. "Willie Nelson, Elton John, Robert Plant Intertwined in Buddy Mag History".
Note: Harris (Byron Holliger Harris, Jr.; born 1946) was a semi-retired reporter who had been with WFAA-TV from 1975 to 2015
