= Texas in My Soul =

Studio album by Willie Nelson
- Released: 1968
- Genre: Country
- Label: RCA Victor
- Producer: Chet Atkins

Willie Nelson chronology
The Party's Over and Other Great Willie Nelson Songs (1967)	Texas in My Soul (1968)	Good Times (1969)

Texas in My Soul is the seventh studio album by country singer Willie Nelson. It was an early concept album that aimed to pay tribute to Texas. The original album artwork features the Alamo, along with three San Antonio construction projects completed in 1968: the Tower of the Americas, HemisFair Arena and the HemisFair monorail system.

== Background ==
By 1968 Nelson had recorded a string of albums for RCA but none had sold in vast quantities. Although he remained very popular in his home state of Texas, and was highly regarded in Nashville for composing hits like “Crazy” and “Hello Walls,” his success as a songwriter did not translate as a commercial recording artist. Nelson felt hamstrung by Nashville's recording practices, feeling the soul of his songs were being buried under background vocalists and strings. According to Nelson, who continued touring with his own band during this time, it was RCA head and producer Chet Atkins who came up with the idea of recording an album dedicated to Texas: “Back in Nashville, Chet Atkins was still racking his brain, trying to find ways to get my records to sell. He came up with a concept, Texas in My Soul, that had me singing songs about my home state. Not a bad idea...But when I tried to use my road band in the studio, Chet said no.”

== Recording and composition ==
Unsurprisingly, the album pays tribute to Texas honky-tonk legend Ernest Tubb with three of his compositions, including the standard “Waltz Across Texas” as well as “There’s a Little Bit of Everything in Texas” and the title track. "Texas in My Soul" was written in the late 1940s by Ernest Tubb and Zeb Turner, along with an uncredited Justin Tubb, Ernest's eleven-year-old son. While singles were cut and released by Tex Williams and Hank Penny, Ernest never recorded the song. Nelson, who cited Tubb as a primary influence, had also appeared on Tubb's syndicated show dozens of times throughout the sixties. "Dallas" was co-written by Dallas-based music promoter Dewey Groom, who owned and operated the Longhorn Ballroom in Dallas, where Nelson regularly played. It was the first song since "Big D" to make that city sound appealing, with references to Love Field airport, the North Central Expressway, and some of the prettiest women in the world, at a time when the city was still regarded negatively as the city where President Kennedy had been assassinated. "The Hill Country Theme" was written by Cindy Walker for Texas Hill Country-born Lyndon B. Johnson, who was President of the United States at the time. The song was adopted as Johnson's official theme song. Arthur Fiedler and the Boston Pops recorded a symphonic version of the song which was included on one of their RCA Victor albums.

While the sound was still a ways off from the one Nelson would cultivate as part of the Outlaw movement in the seventies, the concept played to his strengths, as AllMusic's Mark Deming observes: "While a few of the songs here are real clunkers (the opening track, 'Dallas,' is especially dire), Nelson seems to be having fun with 'Who Put All My Ex's in Texas' and 'Texas in My Soul,' while delivering 'Waltz Across Texas' with commendable feeling, and though the musicians here aren't as simpatico as the core of players Nelson would tour and record with through the '70s and '80s, these sessions seem to suit Nelson's musical personality better than most of his recordings for RCA Victor." According to his book Willie Nelson, biographer Joe Nick Patoski cites the Texas in My Soul sessions as when Atkins finally put his foot down regarding members of Nelson's band playing on his records:

Greg Martin picked his nylon strings in a way that rubbed off on Willie, with Chet Atkins's electric and Jimmy Day's glistening steel chiming in. Funnyman songwriter-performer Ray Stevens, who had already worked several Willie sessions, added vibes and organ. Johnny Bush drummed. Chet informed Willie after the sessions that he didn't want Johnny Bush or Jimmy Day back in the studio. They may have been Willie's guys but they were road pickers, not studio musicians or Chet's guys, and Chet was producer, CEO, and had the last word.

"San Antonio" which was composed by San Antonio steel guitar player Jerry Blanton, who performed with George Chambers and the Country Gentlemen, became Nelson's sixth RCA Victor single, peaking at #50. Chambers and his band had recently backed up Nelson for four weeks in Las Vegas.

== Reception ==
AllMusic: "Not a great album, Texas in My Soul at least devotes itself to something Willie is passionate about, and is good throwaway fun four decades later."

Professional ratings
Review scores
Source	Rating
AllMusic	3.5/5 stars

== Track listing ==
1. "Dallas" (Dewey Groom, Don Stovall) – 2:16
2. "San Antonio" (Jerry Blanton) – 2:32
3. "Streets of Laredo" (Traditional) – 3:33
4. "Who Put All My Ex's in Texas" (Eddie Rabbitt, Tony Moon, Larry Lee) – 2:16
5. "The Hill Country Theme" (Cindy Walker) – 2:20
6. "Waltz Across Texas" (Ernest Tubb) – 2:28
7. "William Barrett Travis Letter" (Merle Travis) – 2:05
8. "Remember the Alamo" (Jane Bowers) – 2:57
9. "Texas in My Soul" (Zeb Turner, Ernest Tubb) – 2:02
10. "There's a Little Bit of Everything in Texas" (Ernest Tubb) – 2:21
11. "Beautiful Texas" (W. Lee O'Daniel) – 2:41

== Personnel ==
- Willie Nelson – vocals, guitar
- Chet Atkins – guitar
- Greg Martin – nylon-string guitar
- Grady Martin – guitar
- Jimmy Day – steel guitar
- Ray Stevens – vibes, organ
- Johnny Bush – drums

== Bibliography ==
- Nelson, Willie; Ritz, David (2015). It's A Long Story: My Life. Little, Brown and Company. ISBN 9780316339315.
- Patoski, Joe Nick (2008). Willie Nelson: An Epic Life. Hachette Digital. ISBN 978-0-316-01778-7.
