= Playin' Hard to Get =

Single by Janie Fricke

from the album Love Notes
- B-side: "Let Me Love You Goodbye"
- Released: October 1978
- Recorded: August 1978
- Studio: Columbia Studio
- Genre: Country-pop
- Length: 3:27
- Label: Columbia
- Songwriter(s): John Thompson
- Producer(s): Billy Sherrill

Janie Fricke singles chronology
| "Please Help Me, I'm Falling (In Love with You)" (1978) | "Playin' Hard to Get" (1978) | "I'll Love Away Your Troubles for Awhile" (1979) |

"'Playin' Hard to Get'" is a song written by John Thompson, and recorded by American country music artist Janie Fricke. It was released as in October 1978 as the first single from the album Love Notes. The song was her fourth solo single release and made chart positions in both the United States and Canada.

== Background, recording and release ==
Janie Fricke signed with Columbia Records in 1977 and released her first single the same year called "What're You Doing Tonight". The song would be followed a series of top 40 charting songs in the late 1970s, including "Playin' Hard to Get". The track was composed by John Thompson. It was produced by Billy Sherrill at the Columbia Studio in August 1978.

"Playin' Hard to Get" was released as a single on Columbia Records in October 1978. It was backed on the B-side by "Let Me Love You Goodbye". It was issued as a seven inch vinyl single and was the fourth solo single released in Fricke's career. The song climbed to number 22 on the America's Billboard Hot Country Songs chart in January 1979 after 12 weeks on the list. On Canada's RPM Country Songs chart, the single reached the top 30. The song was later included on Fricke's second studio album Love Notes (1979).

== Track listing ==
7" vinyl single

- "Playin' Hard to Get" – 3:27
- "Let Me Love You Goodbye" – 3:02

== Charts ==
Chart performance for "Playin' Hard to Get"
| Chart (1978–1979) | Peak position |
|---|---|
| Canada Country Songs (RPM) | 30 |
| US Hot Country Songs (Billboard) | 22 |
