= Singer of Songs =

Studio album by Janie Fricke
- Released: May 1978
- Recorded: June – November 1977
- Studios: Columbia Studio, Nashville, Tennessee
- Genre: Country-pop
- Label: Columbia
- Producer: Billy Sherrill

Janie Fricke chronology
Singer of Songs (1978)	Love Notes (1979)

Singles from Singer of Songs
- 1. "What're You Doing Tonight" Released: August 1977; 2. "Baby It's You" Released: February 1978; 3. "Please Help Me, I'm Fallin'" Released: May 1978

Singer of Songs is a studio album by American country music artist Janie Fricke. It was released in May 1978 via Columbia Records and contained ten tracks. It was the debut studio album of Fricke's recording career and contained three songs that were released as singles to the country market. Its most successful single was a cover of "Please Help Me, I'm Fallin'", which reached the top 20 of the American country singles chart.

== Background and content ==
Janie Fricke was a background vocalist and commercial jingle singer until she was signed by Columbia Records. Fricke would have a series of singles that would make her among the most successful country artists of the 1980s. Her first Columbia release was the 1977 song "What're You Doing Tonight". It was included on her debut studio album, which was recorded in sessions between June and November 1977. These sessions were produced by Billy Sherrill at the Columbia Recording Studio, located in Nashville, Tennessee. A total of ten songs comprised the collection. The album was mostly a collection of new recordings, with the exception of the song "Please Help Me, I'm Fallin'", which was a cover of the hit by Hank Locklin. In addition, "We Could Have Been the Closest of Friends", would also be recorded by Kenny Rogers around the same time for his album Love or Something Like It.

== Release, reception and singles ==
Professional ratings
Review scores
Source	Rating
Allmusic	2.5/5 stars

Singer of Songs was released in May 1978 on Columbia Records, becoming Fricke's debut studio album as a solo artist. It was originally offered as a vinyl LP, with five songs on either side of the record. It was later released to digital and streaming platforms, including Apple Music. In promoting one of the singles from the album, an advertisement in Billboard magazine described Singer of Songs as "stunning". Meanwhile, critic Jim Worbois of AllMusic retrospectively gave the album only 2.5 out of 5 possible stars. "Fricke has a big voice and gives the impression she can do a lot with it. She just never gets around to it on this record. Maybe it's the songs or maybe the arrangements, but she never seems to get into these songs or comes close to putting any emotion in her performances," he wrote.

"What're You Doing Tonight" was released as a single in August 1977. It spent 13 weeks on the Billboard Hot Country Songs chart and peaked at number 21 by November 1977. It was followed by "Baby It's You" as a single in February 1978. It also reached number 21 on the same chart. Fricke's cover of "Please Help Me, I'm Fallin'" was released as the final single in May 1978. The song became her highest-charting hit up to that point, reaching number 12 on the country songs chart by August 1978. All three singles reached charting positions on Canada's RPM Country chart, with "Please Help Me I'm Fallin" reaching number four.

== Track listing ==
=== Vinyl version ===
Side one
No.	Title	Writer(s)	Length
1.	"I Loved You All the Way"	Casey Kelly, Julie Didier	3:17
2.	"We Could Have Been the Closest of Friends"	Johnny Slate, Steve Pippin	3:05
3.	"You Changed My Life in a Moment"	Joe McCracken	2:59
4.	"No One's Ever Gonna Love You"	Frank Coppola, Madeline Sunshine	3:33
5.	"I Believe in You"	McCracken	3:32

Side two
No.	Title	Writer(s)	Length
1.	"Please Help Me, I'm Falling (In Love with You)"	Don Robertson, Hal Blair	3:14
2.	"What're You Doing Tonight"	Bob McDill	2:49
3.	"Week-End Friend"	Troy Seals, Eddie Setser	2:52
4.	"Baby It's You"	John Greenebaum, Thomas Gmeiner	2:42
5.	"I Think I'm Fallin' in Love"	McDill	2:58

=== Digital version ===
Singer of Songs (digital download and streaming)
No.	Title	Length
1.	"I Loved You All the Way"	3:18
2.	"We Could Have Been the Closest of Friends"	3:05
3.	"You Changed My Life in a Moment"	2:59
4.	"No One's Ever Gonna Love You"	3:33
5.	"I Believe in You"	3:35
6.	"Please Help Me, I'm Falling (In Love with You)"	3:16
7.	"What're You Doing Tonight"	2:49
8.	"Week-End Friend"	2:54
9.	"Baby It's You"	2:46
10.	"I Think I'm Fallin' in Love"	3:01

== Personnel ==
All credits are adapted from the liner notes of Singer of Songs.

Musical personnel

- Beegie Adair – strings
- Tommy Allsup – guitar
- Bryon Bach – strings
- Phil Baugh – guitar
- Lea Jane Berinati – backing vocals
- George Binkley – strings
- Jimmy Capps – guitar
- Jerry Carrigan – drums
- John Catchings – strings
- Marvin Chantry – strings
- Roy Christensen – strings
- Virginia Christensen – strings
- Janie Fricke – lead vocals
- Carl Gorodetzky – strings
- Lennie Haight – strings
- Yvonne Hodges – backing vocals
- Ginger Holladay – backing vocals
- Jim Isbell – drums
- Shane Keister – keyboards
- Sheldon Kurland – strings
- Wilfred Lehmann – strings
- Hargus "Pig" Robbins – keyboards
- Don Roth – strings
- Billy Sanford – guitar
- Billy Sherrill – keyboards
- Devin Smith – strings
- Henry Strzelecki – bass
- Samuel Terranova – strings
- Gary Vanosdale – strings
- Jim Vest – steel guitar
- Pete Wade – guitar
- Carole Walker – strings
- Stephanie Woolf – strings
- Reggie Young – guitar

Technical personnel

- Lou Bradley – engineer
- Bill Justis – arrangements
- Slick Lawson – photography
- Billy Sherrill – producer
- Virginia Team – design

== Release history ==
Region	Date	Format	Label	Ref.
North America	May 1978	Vinyl	Columbia Records	
North America	2016	Music download; streaming	Columbia Records	
