= 2017 (disambiguation) =

2017 was a common year starting on Sunday of the Gregorian calendar.

2017 may also refer to:

- 2017 (number)
- "2017" (song), by Rasmus Seebach
- "2017" (Parks and Recreation), a 2015 episode
