= Longhorn Records =

American record label

- Founded: 1957
- Founder: Dewey Groom
- Defunct: 1969
- Status: Defunct
- Genre: Country
- Country of origin: U.S.
- Location: Dallas, Texas

Longhorn Records was an American country music record label based in Dallas, Texas. The label was founded in September, 1957. Dewey Groom acquired the local Dallas label in 1960 in order to further promote acts that were appearing at the Longhorn Ballroom. Bob Wills made his last recordings with the Texas Playboys for Longhorn in 1964 and 1965. Wills made another session with Longhorn, post Playboys, in which the label allowed Wills to make an album of pure folk music, something Wills had long wanted to do but which had never been supported by any of his previous record labels. One of Longhorn's biggest successes was by Phil Baugh, whose song "Country Guitar" appeared at #16 on the Country singles chart, and the accompanying album reach #4 on Billboard's Top Country Albums. Groom closed the label in 1969 in order to devote more of his energies into the Ballroom.

== Artists ==
- Clay Allen
- Phil Baugh
- Rozena Eads
- Al Gliva
- Billy Gray
- Janet McBride
- Vern Stovall
- Bob Wills
