= Baby It's You (disambiguation) =

"Baby It's You" is a 1961 song by The Shirelles, later covered by the Beatles, Smith and the Carpenters.

Baby It's You may also refer to:

- Baby It's You (film), a 1983 film directed by John Sayles and starring Rosanna Arquette and Vincent Spano
- "Baby, It's You", an episode of Law & Order, which crossed over with Homicide: Life on the Street
- Baby It's You!, a 2009 musical featuring pop hits of the 1960s
- Baby It's You (album), a 1962 album by The Shirelles
- "Baby It's You" (Janie Fricke song), 1978
- "Baby It's You", a 1993 song by Silk
- "Baby It's You" (MN8 song), 1995
- "Baby It's You" (JoJo song), 2004
- "Baby It’s You", a song written by Georgie Davis and sung by Chastity at the Dutch Nationaal Songfestival in 2005
- "Baby It's You", a song by June
- "Baby It's You", a song by Promises
- "Baby It's You" (London Grammar song), 2020
- Baby Is You, an album by Toby Fox
