= Love Notes (Janie Fricke album) =

Studio album by Janie Fricke
- Released: March 1979
- Recorded: August – December 1978
- Studio: Columbia Studio
- Genre: Country-pop
- Label: Columbia
- Producer: Billy Sherrill

Janie Fricke chronology
Singer of Songs (1978)	Love Notes (1979)	From the Heart (1979)

Singles from Love Notes
- 1. "Playin' Hard to Get" Released: October 1978; 2. "I'll Love Away Your Troubles for Awhile" Released: February 1979; 3. "Let's Try Again" Released: June 1979

Love Notes is a studio album by American country music artist Janie Fricke. It was released in March 1979 via Columbia Records and contained ten tracks. It was the second album released in Fricke's music career and included three singles that charted in both the United States and Canada. The album was met with favorable reviews from writers and critics.

== Background and content ==
Janie Fricke would eventually have a string of top ten and number one country singles during the 1980s. Prior to that, she first signed a recording contract with Columbia Records after working as a background singer in Nashville, Tennessee. Her first Columbia single nearly reached the top 20 in 1977 called "What're You Doing Tonight". She would continue releasing music during this period including 1979's Love Notes. Fricke recorded the album in two sessions between August and December 1978. Sessions were held at the Columbia Studio in Nashville and she was produced by Billy Sherrill. The album was a collection of ten tracks. It included Fricke's self-composed track "River Blue". It also included a cover of Ann Cole's "Got My Mojo Working" and a track written by Billy Sherrill called "Let Me Love You Goodbye".

== Release, reception and singles ==
Professional ratings
Review scores
Source	Rating
Allmusic	3/5 stars

Love Notes was originally released in March 1979 on Columbia Records. It was originally offered as a vinyl LP, containing five tracks on either side of the record. It was later available to digital and streaming platforms, including Apple Music. The disc was Fricke's second studio album issued in her recording career and her second with Columbia. The album was met with a favorable review from Billboard magazine in 1979 who highlighted its eclectic mix of traditional country and country pop. Critics also praised her vocal ability and phrasing. The disc was also given three out of five stars from AllMusic.

Three singles were spawned from Love Notes. The first was "Playin' Hard to Get", which was released in October 1978. The song peaked at number 22 on the American Billboard Hot Country Songs chart after 22 weeks. "I'll Love Away Your Troubles for Awhile" was released as a single in February 1979. It became the highest-peaking single from the record, reaching number 14 on the Billboard country chart. The third and final single was "Let's Try Again", which was released in June 1979. The single peaked at number 28 on the Billboard country survey. All three singles also reached the Canadian RPM Country Songs chart. "I'll Love Your Troubles Away for Awhile" became the biggest hit of the singles in Canada, peaking at number four on the chart in 1979.

== Track listings ==
=== Vinyl version ===
Side one
No.	Title	Writer(s)	Length
1.	"I'll Love Away Your Troubles for Awhile"	Johnny MacRae; Bob Morrison	2:37
2.	"Somewhere to Come When It Rains"	Red Lane	3:04
3.	"River Blue"	Janie Fricke	3:20
4.	"Let's Try Again"	David Steagall	3:33
5.	"Let Me Love You Goodbye"	Stephen Allen Davis; Billy Sherrill	3:02

Side two
No.	Title	Writer(s)	Length
1.	"Love Is Worth It All"	Shelda Bates; Angela Wilson	3:12
2.	"You're the One I Love"	Stephen Ferguson	3:21
3.	"Playin' Hard to Get"	John Thompson	3:27
4.	"Stirrin' Up Feelin's"	Jerry Foster; Bill Rice	2:55
5.	"Got My Mojo Working"	Preston Foster	2:50

=== Digital version ===
Love Notes (Music download and streaming)
No.	Title	Writer(s)	Length
1.	"I'll Love Away Your Troubles for Awhile"	MacRae; Morrison	2:37
2.	"Somewhere to Come When It Rains"	Lane	3:04
3.	"River Blue"	Fricke	3:20
4.	"Let's Try Again"	Steagall	3:33
5.	"Let Me Love You Goodbye"	Davis; Sherrill	3:02
6.	"Love Is Worth It All"	Bates; Wilson	3:12
7.	"You're the One I Love"	Ferguson	3:21
8.	"Playin' Hard to Get"	Thompson	3:27
9.	"Stirrin' Up Feelin's"	Foster; Rice	2:55
10.	"Got My Mojo Working"	P. Foster	2:50

== Personnel ==
All credits are adapted from the liner notes of Love Notes.

Technical personnel

- Lou Bradley – engineer
- Bill Justis – arrangement
- Norman Seeff – photography
- Billy Sherrill – producer
- Virginia Team – art direction

== Release history ==
Region	Date	Format	Label	Ref.
North America	March 1979	Vinyl	Columbia Records	
United Kingdom	March 1979	Vinyl	CBS	
North America	2016	Music download; streaming	Columbia Records	
