= Let's Try Again (song) =

Single by Janie Fricke

from the album Love Notes
- B-side: "Love Is Worth It All"
- Released: June 1979
- Recorded: December 1978
- Studio: Columbia Studio
- Genre: Country-pop
- Length: 3:27
- Label: Columbia
- Songwriter(s): Danny Steagall
- Producer(s): Billy Sherrill

Janie Fricke singles chronology
"I'll Love Away Your Troubles for Awhile" (1979)	"Let's Try Again" (1979)	"But Love Me" (1979)

"'Let's Try Again'" is a song written by Danny Steagall, and recorded by American country music artist Janie Fricke. It was released in June 1979 as the third single from the album Love Notes. The song was her sixth solo single release and made chart positions in both the United States and Canada.

== Background, recording and release ==
Janie Fricke signed with Columbia Records in 1977 and released her first single the same year called "What're You Doing Tonight". The song would be followed a series of top 40 charting songs in the late 1970s, including "Let's Try Again". The track was composed by Danny Steagall. It was produced by Billy Sherrill at the Columbia Studio in December 1978.

"Let's Try Again" was released as a single on Columbia Records in June 1979. It was backed on the B-side by "Love Is Worth It All". It was issued as a seven inch vinyl single and marked the sixth solo single released in Fricke's career. The song climbed to number 28 on the America's Billboard Hot Country Songs chart in January 1979 after 12 weeks on the list. On Canada's RPM Country Songs chart, it became her first single to chart outside the top 40, reaching number 52. The song was later included on Fricke's second studio album Love Notes (1979).

== Track listing ==
7" vinyl single

- "Let's Try Again" – 3:33
- "Love Is Worth It All" – 3:12

== Charts ==
Chart performance for "Let's Try Again"
Chart (1979)	Peak position
Canada Country Songs (RPM)	52
US Hot Country Songs (Billboard)	28
