= Good Times (Willie Nelson album) =

Studio album by Willie Nelson
- Released: Autumn 1968
- Recorded: Late 1967
- Genre: Country
- Label: RCA Victor
- Producers: Chet Atkins, Felton Jarvis

Willie Nelson chronology
Texas in My Soul (1968)	Good Times (1968)	My Own Peculiar Way (1969)

Good Times is the eighth studio album by American country music singer Willie Nelson, released in 1968. The arrangements were by Anita Kerr, Bill Walker and Ray Stevens.

== Background ==
Although Nelson enjoyed a loyal and enthusiastic following in Texas, his record sales at RCA remained underwhelming. In a bid to break Nelson as a major recording star, producer Chet Atkins had employed many of the recording techniques that had worked for other stars on the label, but as the sixties neared a close it was becoming plain to Nelson that the Nashville sound simply did not suit his own musical instincts. As the singer later explained, “Because Chet was convinced I could be a superstar, it was hard to walk away from his operation...Yet his way of producing, for all its technical wonders, fenced me in. I knew it, but, blinded by ambition, I accepted the formula. I should have known better, but the truth is it took me a long time – all of the sixties, in fact – to finally see the light.”

== Recording and composition ==
After recording an LP of cover songs, Good Times contains almost all Nelson compositions, including three written with his wife Shirley. It is very ballad heavy, with Jim Worbois of AllMusic noting, “This is kind of an odd record. One side is very sparse instrumentally, while the other side has three different people providing arrangements.” Two older songs, "Permanently Lonely" and "Did I Ever Love You," had been covered previously by Timi Yuro, the latter as a duet with Nelson. Tellingly, one of the two covers songs on the album was “Sweet Memories,” a song composed by Mickey Newbury, a singer-songwriter who, like Nelson, would express dissatisfaction with his debut RCA album Harlequin Melodies and blaze a trail of independent recording in defiance of Nashville that would serve as a template for the Outlaw movement in the seventies. Like Nelson, Newbury wrote atmospheric, poetic songs, which were at odds with the slick hit singles that Nashville manufactured. As Streissguth asserts, “In late 1967, Willie, in his bleating, wistful way, had recorded a set of starkly beautiful ballads, including the classic ‘Sweet Memories,’ written by Mickey Newbury, but RCA appeared flummoxed in response, slotting them in an album called Good Times next to syrupy Nashville Sound material recorded at earlier sessions.”

Regarding songs on the second side of the Good Times, Nelson later lamented that his vocals were “drowned in a pool of overly sweet string arrangements and syrupy backgrounds by the Anita Kerr Singers.” The first single, “Little Things,” climbed to number 22 on the country singles chart, while “Good Times” stalled at number 44, while the LP itself limped to number 29 on the country albums chart. As Nelson later recalled, “I was still caught up in a system – the Nashville music assembly line – where conformity was mandatory, and where it seemed to come with string sections and choirs of angels.”

== Reception ==
AllMusic: “The songs are okay (maybe subpar for Nelson), with one of the most interesting being his cover of Mickey Newbury's ‘Sweet Memories.’”

Professional ratings
Review scores
Source	Rating
AllMusic	2.5/5 stars

The song "Buddy" was played on the NBC sitcom Parks and Recreation. It is a favorite of the character Ron Swanson, and is played during the fourth episode of season 7, "Leslie and Ron". It was played again in the series finale, the twelfth episode of season 7, "One Last Ride", during Ron's future preview.

== Track listing ==
All tracks composed by Willie Nelson; except where noted.

1. "Good Times"
2. "December Day"
3. "Sweet Memories" (Mickey Newbury)
4. "Little Things" (Willie Nelson, Shirley Nelson)
5. "Pages" (W. Nelson, S. Nelson)
6. "She's Still Gone" (W. Nelson, S. Nelson)
7. "Ashamed"
8. "A Wonderful Yesterday"
9. "Permanently Lonely"
10. "Down to Our Last Goodbye" (Jan Crutchfield, Wayne Moss)
11. "Buddy"
12. "Did I Ever Love You"

== Personnel ==
- Willie Nelson – guitar, vocals
- Anita Kerr Singers – backing vocals

== Bibliography ==
- Nelson, Willie; Ritz, David (2015). It's A Long Story: My Life. Little, Brown and Company. ISBN 9780316339315.
- Patoski, Joe Nick (2008). Willie Nelson: An Epic Life. Hachette Digital. ISBN 978-0-316-01778-7.
- Streissguth, Michael (2013). Outlaw: Waylon, Willie, Kris, and the Renegades of Nashville. HarperCollins. ISBN 978-0062038180.
