= From the Heart (Janie Fricke album) =

Studio album by Janie Fricke
- Released: November 1979
- Recorded: August 1979
- Studio: Columbia (Nashville, Tennessee)
- Genre: Country-pop
- Label: Columbia
- Producer: Billy Sherrill

Janie Fricke chronology
Love Notes (1979)	From the Heart (1979)	Nice 'n' Easy (1980)

Singles from From the Heart
- 1. "But Love Me" Released: October 1979; 2. "Pass Me By (If You're Only Passing Through)" Released: January 1980

From the Heart is a studio album by American country music artist Janie Fricke. It was released in November 1979 via Columbia Records and contained ten tracks. It was the third studio release of Fricke's career and spawned two singles that charted on the country surveys in the United States and Canada. This included a cover of "Pass Me By (If You're Only Passing Through)", which was issued as a single in 1980.

== Background and content ==
Janie Fricke was a studio background vocalist who received enough attention in her session work to sign her own recording contract with Columbia Records. The label released a series of Fricke's recordings in the late 1970s that helped her establish a musical identity. Among these releases was 1979's From the Heart. The album was recorded at the Columbia Studios in Nashville, Tennessee in August 1979. Similar to her previous release, the project was produced by Billy Sherrill. From the Heart consisted of ten tracks. The collection included the song "My World Begins and Ends with You", which would later become a top ten country single for the trio Dave & Sugar. It also included a cover of Doris Day's 1952 hit "When I Fall in Love" and Johnny Rodriguez's 1973 country hit "Pass Me By (If You're Only Passing Through)".

== Release, reception and singles ==
From the Heart was released in November 1979 on Columbia Records. It was the third studio album released in Fricke's career and the third with the Columbia label. It was originally offered as a vinyl LP with five selections on both sides of the record. It was also issued overseas in the United Kingdom under CBS Records International. Decades later, the album was re-released to digital and streaming platforms including Apple Music. From the Heart was Fricke's first album to chart in Canada, reaching number ten on the RPM Country Albums list in 1979. The disc would later receive four out of five stars from AllMusic.

Two singles were released from From the Heart. The first was "But Love Me", which was issued on Columbia in October 1979. It spent 13 weeks on the American Billboard Top Country Albums chart before peaking at number 26 in January 1980. The second single released was Fricke's cover of "Pass Me By (If You're Only Passing Through)", which was issued in January 1980. It spent 12 weeks on the Billboard country chart and climbed to number 22 later in the year. "Pass Me By" also reached Canada's RPM Country Singles survey, peaking in the top 20 at number 19.

== Track listings ==
=== Vinyl version ===
Side one
No.	Title	Writer(s)	Length
1.	"But Love Me"	Kenny Nolan	2:59
2.	"Fallin' for You"	Tim Hubler	3:20
3.	"My World Begins and Ends with You"	Larry Keith; Steve Pippin	2:50
4.	"A Cool September"	Billy Sherrill; Glenn Sutton	2:35
5.	"When I Fall in Love"	Edward Heyman; Victor Young	2:59

Side two
No.	Title	Writer(s)	Length
1.	"Pass Me By (If You're Only Passing Through)"	H.B. Hall	2:58
2.	"Gonna Love Ya (Till the Cows Come Home)"	Rick Carnes; Susan Drake	3:55
3.	"Some Fools Don't Ever Learn"	John Tipton	2:57
4.	"One Piece at a Time"	Randy Jackson	2:52
5.	"This Ain't Tennessee and He Ain't You"	Larry Bastian; James Shaw	3:57

=== Digital version ===
From the Heart (music download and streaming)
No.	Title	Writer(s)	Length
1.	"But Love Me"	Nolan	3:06
2.	"Fallin' for You"	Hubler	3:19
3.	"My World Begins and Ends with You"	Keith; Pippin	2:53
4.	"A Cool September"	Sherrill; Sutton	2:37
5.	"When I Fall in Love"	Heyman; Young	2:58
6.	"Pass Me By (If You're Only Passing Through)"	Hall	3:01
7.	"Gonna Love Ya (Till the Cows Come Home)"	Carnes; Drake	2:57
8.	"Some Fools Don't Ever Learn"	Tipton	3:00
9.	"One Piece at a Time"	Jackson	2:54
10.	"This Ain't Tennessee and He Ain't You"	Bastian; Shaw	3:58

== Personnel ==
All credits are adapted from the liner notes of From the Heart.

Musical personnel

- Phil Baugh – electric guitar
- Ken Bell – acoustic guitar
- Lea Jane Berinati – backing vocals
- Roger Clark – drums
- Nick DiStefano – backing vocals
- Chalmers Davis – keyboards, piano
- Pete Drake – steel guitar
- Jimmy English – electric guitar
- Ralph Ezell – drums
- Janie Fricke – lead vocals, backing vocals
- Johnny Gimble – fiddle
- Owen Hale – drums
- Larry Keith – backing vocals
- The Shelly Kurland Strings – strings
- Jerry Kroon – drums
- Weldon Myrick – steel guitar
- Steve Nathan – keyboards, piano
- Steve Pippin – backing vocals
- Hargus "Pig" Robbins – keyboards, piano
- Marcia Routh – backing vocals
- Billy Sanford – acoustic guitar, guitar
- Henry Strzelecki – bass
- Diane Tidwell – backing vocals
- Jerry Wallace – acoustic guitar
- Pete Wade – acoustic guitar, guitar
- Bob Wray – bass

Technical personnel

- Bill Justis – string arrangements
- Billy Sherrill – producer

== Chart performance ==
Chart (1979)	Peak position
Canada Country Albums/CD's (RPM)	10

== Release history ==
Region	Date	Format	Label	Ref.
North America	November 1979	Vinyl	Columbia Records	
United Kingdom	November 1979	Vinyl	CBS Records International	
North America	2016	Music download; streaming	Columbia Records	
