= Parks and Recreation season 7 =

Season of television series

Parks and Recreation
- Season 7
- DVD cover
- Showrunner: Michael Schur
- Starring: Amy Poehler; Aziz Ansari; Nick Offerman; Aubrey Plaza; Chris Pratt; Adam Scott; Jim O'Heir; Retta; Billy Eichner
- No. of episodes: 13

Release
- Original network: NBC
- Original release: January 13 – February 24, 2015

Season chronology
- ← Previous; Season 6 Next → "A Parks and Recreation Special"

The seventh and final season of Parks and Recreation aired in the United States on the NBC television network from January 13, 2015, until February 24, 2015. The season consisted of 13 episodes. It stars Amy Poehler, Aziz Ansari, Nick Offerman, Aubrey Plaza, Chris Pratt, Adam Scott, Jim O'Heir, and Retta, with a supporting performance from Billy Eichner.

This season differs from any other season of Parks and Recreation, in that it details a much larger story arc for the characters, showcasing their growth over the course of the show. Set in 2017, three years after the events of the sixth season, the season includes Leslie Knope's (Amy Poehler) new career as Regional Director of the National Park Service, in addition to her two-year-long fallout with former boss Ron Swanson (Nick Offerman). Also included is the rise of fictional tech company Gryzzl taking over Pawnee, Leslie's plea to Sweetums for a Pawnee National Park, and the eventual career departures of the gang from the Parks department.

== Cast ==
=== Main ===
- Amy Poehler as Leslie Knope, a passionate government employee who loves her home town. She has not let politics dampen her optimism; her ultimate goal is to become President of the United States. Poehler departed from the NBC sketch comedy series Saturday Night Live, where she was a cast member for nearly seven years, to star in Parks and Recreation. It was only after she was cast that Daniels and Schur established the general concept of the show and the script for the pilot was written.
- Aziz Ansari as Tom Haverford, (Note: Ansari and Eichner do not appear and are not credited in the episode "The Johnny Karate Super Awesome Musical Explosion Show".) Leslie's former sarcastic and underachieving subordinate, who has left his city hall job to pursue his own entrepreneurial interests. Daniels and Schur had intended to cast Ansari from the earliest stages of the development of Parks and Recreation.
- Nick Offerman as Ron Swanson, the former parks and recreation director who, as a libertarian, believes in as small a government as possible. As such, Ron strives to make his department as ineffective as possible, and favors hiring employees who do not care about their jobs or are poor at them. Nevertheless, Ron consistently demonstrates that he secretly cares deeply about his co-workers.
- Aubrey Plaza as April Ludgate-Dwyer, a cynical and uninterested former parks department intern who now works for Leslie at the National Parks Department. The role was written specifically for Plaza; after meeting her, casting director Allison Jones told Schur, "I just met the weirdest girl I've ever met in my life. You have to meet her and put her on your show."
- Chris Pratt as Andy Dwyer, a goofy, dim-witted but lovable slacker. Pratt was originally intended to be a guest star and the character Andy was initially meant to appear only in the first season, but the producers liked Pratt so much that, almost immediately after casting him, they decided to make him a regular cast member starting with season two.
- Adam Scott as Ben Wyatt, a brilliant but socially awkward government official trying to redeem his past as a failed mayor in his youth. Scott left his starring role on the Starz comedy series Party Down to join the show.
- Jim O'Heir as Garry Gergich, a sweet-natured but painfully incompetent longtime city employee who is the main target of the office's petty unkindness, yet enjoys his life as the husband of a gorgeous woman and the father of three beautiful daughters. He reached retirement with a full pension in season 5, but returned to the Parks office to work as an intern. As of season six, the other characters have taken to calling him "Larry Gengurch," after he accidentally called himself that name. In a flashforward at the end of the season 6 finale, he is now called Terry. By the end of the season 7 episode "Donna & Joe", his friends finally call him by his real name Garry, thanks to Donna.
- Retta as Donna Meagle, the confident and competent former office manager for the Pawnee Parks and Recreation Department. She is now accepting of her former coworkers, previously dismissing them as boring. She currently works as a real estate agent. She has little tolerance for stupidity, can sometimes be selfish, enjoys casual dating, and is irresistible to many men. Donna loves her car, a Mercedes-Benz M-Class SUV.

=== Starring ===
- Billy Eichner as Craig Middlebrooks, the hot-tempered director of the Pawnee parks department. After appearing in numerous episodes throughout the sixth season, Eichner was promoted from a recurring role to a starring role in the cast, beginning with "Leslie & Ron," the fourth episode of season seven.

=== Recurring ===
- Natalie Morales as Lucy, Tom's ex-girlfriend and bartender at The Snakehole Lounge. She is later hired to manage Tom's Bistro.
- Megan Mullally as Tammy Swanson (also known as "Tammy Two"), a librarian and Ron's sex-crazed ex-wife.
- Ben Schwartz as Jean-Ralphio, Tom's best friend and frequent business associate.
- Mo Collins as Joan Callamezzo, a Pawnee talk show host known for her ludicrous behavior and time on the show Pawnee Today.
- Jay Jackson as Perd Hapley, a popular Pawnee television journalist and the host of news programs Ya Heard? With Perd! and The Final Word with Perd!.
- Jon Glaser as Jeremy Jamm, a Pawnee councilman and Leslie's long time arch-rival.
- Susan Yeagley as Jessica Newport, former Miss Pawnee 1994 & CEO of the Sweetums Corporation.
- Jenny Slate as Mona-Lisa Saperstein, Tom's crazy ex-girlfriend and Jean-Ralphio's sister.
- Marc Evan Jackson as Trevor Nelsson, a lawyer who provides legal assistance for the Newport Family.
- Jonathan Joss as Ken Hotate, leader of the Wamapoke people and owner of the Wamapoke casino in Pawnee.
- Blake Anderson as Mike Bean, CEO of tech-company "Gryzzl".
- Jorma Taccone as Roscoe Santangelo, vice-president of Cool New Shiz at tech-company "Gryzzl".
- Kathryn Hahn as Jennifer Barkley, a blunt, supercharged political consultant who was Bobby Newport's campaign manager when he was running against Leslie.
- Henry Winkler as Dr. Saperstein, a local gynecologist and the wealthy father of Jean-Ralphio and Mona Lisa.
- Helen Slayton-Hughes as Ethel Beavers, an elderly Pawnee government worker who publicly reveals her 46-year affair with Mayor Gunderson.
- Keegan-Michael Key as Joe, a school principal who becomes Donna's husband.

=== Guest stars ===
- Rashida Jones as Ann Perkins, a nurse who gradually becomes more involved in Pawnee government through her friendship with Leslie. She is also Chris' girlfriend and mother to Oliver and Leslie.
- Rob Lowe as Chris Traeger, an excessively positive and extremely health-conscious government official. He is also Ann's boyfriend and father to their children Oliver and Leslie.
- Werner Herzog as Keg Jeggings, the owner of a creepy house April and Andy purchase.
- Dax Shepard as Hank Muntak, station manager at Pawnee Community Access, the public television network that broadcasts the "Johnny Karate" television show
- Peter Serafinowicz as Lord Edgar Covington, Andy's former employer
- Sam Elliott as Ron Dunn, the former head of the Eagleton parks department.
- Josh Groban as himself
- Questlove as Levondrious Meagle, Donna's estranged younger brother.
- Ginuwine as a fictionalized version of himself as Donna's cousin.
- Barbara Boxer as herself
- Kirsten Gillibrand as herself
- John McCain as himself
- Cory Booker as himself
- Orrin Hatch as himself
- Madeleine Albright as herself
- John Cena as himself, one of the guests on the final episode of Andy's show.
- Paul Rudd as Bobby Newport, a dimwitted multimillionaire heir of the Sweetums Candy Company fortune, and former candidate for city council running against Leslie.
- Bill Murray as Walter Gunderson, mayor of Pawnee
- Jon Hamm as Ed, a former incompetent employee of the National Park Service.
- Kevin Symons as Bill Dexhart, a Pawnee councilman who is a self described pervert.
- Yvans Jourdain as Councilman Douglass Howser, a Pawnee councilman who is the leader of the council.
- Joe Biden as himself
- Jill Biden as herself

== Episodes ==
^{†} denotes an extended episode. ^{‡} denotes an hour-long episode.

Parks and Recreation, season 7 episodes
No. overall	No. in season	Title	Directed by	Written by	Original release date	U.S. viewers (millions)
113	1	"2017"	Dean Holland	Alan Yang & Matt Murray	January 13, 2015	3.75
In 2017, Leslie is Midwest Regional Parks Director, Ben is still City Manager, both April and Andy are working for Leslie (with Andy having his own TV show), Jerry/Larry works for Leslie but is now called Terry, Ron left the Parks Department and owns a construction company called "Very Good", Tom is a mogul who owns Pawnee's most successful businesses, and Donna now runs her "Regal Meagle" Real Estate firm and is engaged. Ron and Leslie are now enemies due to an unexplained incident called "Morningstar". Ron and a partner from Gryzzl (a tech company now located in Pawnee) are trying to buy land from the wealthy Newport family that Leslie wants to acquire for a national park. Ben is honored at a gala as Man of the Year for helping Pawnee getting back to normal. Elsewhere, April has concerns about her life with Andy, feeling they have become a boring, mainstream married couple.
114	2	"Ron and Jammy"^{†}	Dean Holland	Harris Wittels	January 13, 2015	3.25
Leslie and Ron try to sway Councilman Jamm's vote on whether the Newport land will be zoned commercial or municipal, but they put aside their differences to help Jamm break up from Ron's ex-wife Tammy II. Meanwhile, Ben helps April find her true passion in life, Andy and Tom travel to Chicago to visit Tom's ex-girlfriend Lucy after Tom misinterprets her Gryzzl post, and Joan Callamezzo is celebrated for her years as a Pawnee celebrity.
115	3	"William Henry Harrison"	Tom Magill	Megan Amram	January 20, 2015	3.87
Leslie continues to strengthen her case to turn Newport land into a National Park with the help of Andy, April and the Pawnee Historical Society. Ron, along with Tom and Donna, tries to get a celebrity on board to help the Gryzzl campaign. As Leslie and Ron come closer to their goals however, their rivalry comes to an all-time high. After the press conference, it culminates in Leslie and Ron screaming at the top of their lungs, forcing the others to intervene. Meanwhile, after Ben hears Terry has fulfilled a "lifelong goal" of becoming a Notary public, the two try to get documents signed. But it turns into a hassle after their efforts get invalidated over and over.
116	4	"Leslie and Ron"	Beth McCarthy-Miller	Michael Schur	January 20, 2015	3.30
Ben, April, Andy, Donna, Tom, and Terry trap Ron and Leslie in the old Parks and Recreation office overnight so the two can work out their differences. It is revealed that "Morningstar", the incident that drove the wedge between Leslie and Ron, was a project of Ron's construction company that involved bulldozing houses near Pawnee Commons, including Ann Perkins' old house, to make way for an apartment building. Ron reveals that after Leslie took April, Andy and Terry to work with her, and Tom and Donna left to run their businesses, he got lonely for his old friends and one day, he suddenly didn't recognize anyone in the department. He decided to ask Leslie for a job in the National Park Service during lunch the following day, but when she stood him up for lunch due to her hectic schedule, he just quit. The two finally reconcile through the power of alcohol, and the rest of the former department find a very confusing scene the next morning. Ron later meets Leslie for lunch and gives her a picture frame made of Ann's front door.
117	5	"Gryzzlbox"	Amy Poehler	Donick Cary	January 27, 2015	3.48
The citizens of Pawnee feel violated when Gryzzl starts invading their privacy through data mining. Looking to capitalize on the negative public opinion, Leslie and Ben investigate the problem along with Donna. Craig seeks help from April with the new Parks Department interns. Elsewhere, Tom becomes Andy's agent to help him with his TV show troubles. Tom later learns that Lucy went back to Chicago to break up with her boyfriend.
118	6	"Save JJ's"	Ken Whittingham	Joe Mande	January 27, 2015	2.97
Following the data mining scandal, Gryzzl ups its offer for the Newport land to $125 million, and they accept. Leslie learns that JJ's Diner is closing because of the new Pawnee economic boom, as it has been purchased by Dennis Feinstein (Jason Mantzoukas) who wants to tear it down. Leslie, Ron, April and Andy host a rally to keep JJ's open. When that fails, the group finds a way to relocate JJ's, while convincing Gryzzl to restore a rundown area of Pawnee for its new headquarters and gain some badly needed publicity points by donating the Newport land for a national park. Elsewhere, Tom surprises Donna with an early wedding gift: a "Treat Yo Self" day in Beverly Hills, CA.
119	7	"Donna and Joe"	Ken Whittingham	Aisha Muharrar	February 3, 2015	3.45
It's Donna's wedding day, and as her Maid of Honor, April does everything to keep Donna's family together so the wedding will run smoothly. Craig marshals Donna's wedding with an iron fist. Ben receives an offer from Jen Barkley (Kathryn Hahn) about running for Congress. Elsewhere, Ron helps Tom share his true feelings with Lucy.
120	8	"Ms. Ludgate-Dwyer Goes to Washington"	Morgan Sackett	Dave King	February 10, 2015	3.06
Leslie takes April to Washington D.C. on a DoI assignment that involves meeting with many Senators, but April hasn't been able to tell Leslie she no longer wants to work in government, while Leslie is told she's in line to take on a high-level leadership role at Interior. Back in Pawnee, Andy joins forces with Ben and Ron (and reluctantly Garry) to try and convince his old almost-employer Barney to hire April as a consultant.
121	9	"Pie-Mary"^{†}	Greg Daniels	Emma Fletcher & Rachna Fruchbom	February 10, 2015	2.47
Leslie becomes the center of attention when at Ben's Congressional campaign, she announces that she will not participate in a "Pie-Mary" pie baking contest and is subsequently scrutinized by several opposing groups. Meanwhile, Ron, April and Andy go on a scavenger hunt to find Ron's spare key to his house that April lost. Elsewhere, Donna bonds with Garry.
122	10	"The Johnny Karate Super Awesome Musical Explosion Show"	Dean Holland	Matt Hubbard	February 17, 2015	2.94
Andy hosts the final episode of his children's show. Ben, Leslie, April and Ron reminisce over how far Andy has come in Pawnee. April finds it difficult to watch Andy end his TV show, knowing it is her new job that is forcing them to leave Pawnee. Note: This episode was presented as the final episode of Andy's "Johnny Karate Super Awesome Musical Explosion Show" television show. Fictional commercials for some of Pawnee's businesses are also shown.
123	11	"Two Funerals"	Craig Zisk	Jen Statsky	February 17, 2015	2.47
Leslie confirms that she is taking the job at the Department of the Interior and she and Ben will be moving to Washington D.C. April and Andy also confirm that they will be moving to Washington D.C. Donna announces that she and her husband Joe are moving to Seattle, Washington. While discussing these revelations, it is announced that Mayor Walter Gunderson (Bill Murray) has died. There is a memorial service, and Ben conducts a search for an interim Mayor with April's assistance. Donna and Andy help Ron grieve when his barber, Salvatore, also dies. Encouraged by Leslie, Tom successfully proposes to Lucy. After interviewing several candidates, Ben names Garry the mayor of Pawnee.
124	12	"One Last Ride"^{†‡}	Michael Schur	Michael Schur & Amy Poehler	February 24, 2015	4.15
125	13	"One Last Ride"^{†‡}	Michael Schur	Michael Schur & Amy Poehler	February 24, 2015	4.15
In the last day in Pawnee, Leslie rallies the entire team for one last Parks Project: fixing a swing in a park. A series of flash-forwards show bits of what will happen to the characters over the next years and decades. Typhoon and Craig get married, Andy and April become parents, Donna sets up a non-profit with her husband, Tom becomes a best-selling author, Garry serves as Mayor until his death at age 100, and Ron finds happiness in a job as a park superintendent for the National Park Service. Ben is elected to Congress, and he and Leslie are separately courted to run for governor of Indiana. After considering who should run, Ben decides that Leslie would be a better candidate. The two then visit the Parks department and see all of their friends once more. Ann and Chris reappear and decide to move back to Pawnee. In the future Leslie serves two terms as governor, and hints at a "new, unknown challenge" in a speech; at Garry's funeral (depicted earlier in the episode, but occurring further in the future), she and Ben are accompanied by what appears to be a Secret Service detail, in a scene left intentionally ambiguous.

== Production ==
All 13 episodes were aired in seven weeks by airing two each week, back-to-back (with the exception of one week). Production began on August 11, 2014, and ended on December 12, 2014. Although the program initially premiered in NBC's Must See TV Thursday night block, the final episodes were moved to Tuesdays, possibly in an attempt to compete with ABC's dramas.

== Reception ==
The seventh season of Parks and Recreation largely received positive praise from critics. Rotten Tomatoes gave the season an 89% rating based on 27 critic reviews with an average rating of 7.7/10. The critical consensus reads: "Parks and Recreation's closing chapter deftly incorporates time-skip gags into the everyday bureaucracy of Pawnee, all while delivering a moving farewell to a cast of characters audiences have grown to love like family."

IGN reviewer Matt Fowler gave the series finale a perfect 10 out of 10 score, saying "Doing what the show does best, Parks knocked it clear out of the park with "One Last Ride." A remarkably irresistible swirl of love and satire. The writers knew it wasn't enough to just send everyone off into the future. They knew we needed to see that future. Not just for peace of mind, but because we've all become so lovingly invested in the characters. This final season proved to us that we could withstand a time jump and still remain attached to everyone. And this finale used that to hop through the Pawnee gang's futures, creating an exciting, heartwarming journey."

The New Yorker's Emily Nussbaum contended that the series finale invoked "few laughs", and Screen Rant's Nathanial Eker-Male called the season "jarring and distracting". The Guardian critic Diane Shipley claimed that the season "jumped the shark".

== Accolades ==
The seventh season of Parks and Recreation was nominated for the Primetime Emmy Award for Outstanding Comedy Series and Amy Poehler received her sixth Emmy nomination for Outstanding Lead Actress in a Comedy Series for her performance in the series finale, "One Last Ride".
