= Leslie and Ron =

- Parks and Recreation episode
- Episode no.: Season 7 Episode 4
- Directed by: Beth McCarthy-Miller
- Written by: Michael Schur
- Original air date: January 20, 2015

Guest appearances
- Jorma Taccone as Roscoe Santangelo; Erinn Hayes as Annabel Porter; Hamilton Mitchell as Bill Haggerty; Richard Burch as Herman Lerpiss; Timothee Baltz as Zach Harrison; Gary Carlos Cervantes as Manrico Della Rosa

Episode chronology
← Previous "William Henry Harrison"	Next → "Gryzzlbox"
- Parks and Recreation season 7

"Leslie and Ron" is the fourth episode of the seventh season of the American comedy television series Parks and Recreation and the 116th overall episode of the series. It aired on NBC on January 20, 2015, immediately following the previous episode, "William Henry Harrison". The story picks up right where "William Henry Harrison" left off: the Parks & Recreation gang finds Leslie and Ron's rivalry cumbersome and locks them in a room together to hash things out. Because most of the episode only covers a short period of time, time cards appear during various points during Leslie and Ron's entrapment.

== Plot ==
Ben tricks Leslie and Ron into meeting him in the Parks and Recreation office to sign a document. April, Andy, Tom, Donna, and Terry are also there, supporting Ben's plan for Leslie and Ron to resolve their differences. Ben explains that once Leslie and Ron figure things out, they can call him through a baby monitor placed in the office. Otherwise, they would have to wait there until 8 am. of the next day (without phones, an internet connection, or security), for the doors to automatically open. Ron's plea to Jerry to unlock the door and let them out nearly works, but Leslie screws it up by telling Jerry "for once in your life, do something right" which leads him to put away his key long enough for April to take his arm and lead him out the door with the rest of them, and keeping Leslie locked inside with Ron.

10:04 pm

Leslie suggests that they call Ben with the baby monitor and pretend to have reconciled, but they can't come to an agreement about what to tell Ben. She ultimately breaks the baby monitor, effectively locking them in the office until 8.

10:36 pm

Leslie thinks that they should use their time wisely and talk about their feelings, while Ron is adamant against doing so. Leslie uses several annoyance tactics on Ron to get him to talk: dripping water on his face, covering him in post-its, etc. Finally, she finds one method that works: playing Billy Joel's "We Didn't Start the Fire" and singing made-up lyrics over the track. In exchange for turning off the song, Ron agrees to speak for 3 minutes.

11:01 pm

Leslie draws up a timeline of important moments from their relationship, and goes over each item with Ron. The timeline starts with Leslie leaving the Parks department for her National Park Service job. The next item on the timeline is Leslie hiring April, three months later. This is followed by Ron visiting Leslie, another three months later, at her office. Just one week later, Leslie had found out that Ron had quit his job at the Parks department and started up his own company. Two months later, Ron's company had announced its plans to build a tall apartment complex next to Leslie's first park, and tear down Ann's old house in the process. Wrapping up her summary of their relationship, Leslie announces that this was the start of their rivalry. Ron replies with a cryptic "that's not the whole story," leaving Leslie bewildered and desperate to find out the truth. However, Leslie's three minutes of allotted talking time ends here, and Ron locks himself in his office (having whittled himself a spare key while Leslie was talking).

1:57 am

Ron walks into the conference room to find that Leslie is neck deep in her search to figure out the true reason for their fallout. Leslie is convinced that the clue to the mystery lies in her first job interview with Ron. Although they share an amicable conversation about their past, Ron is still not ready to talk, and pulls the fire alarm to avoid confrontation. However, he finds that the alarm had been disconnected from the fire station, and only has the ability to set off sprinklers—leaving them both sopping wet.

3:37 am

After changing from their wet clothes, Ron and Leslie sit down, and over a bottle of scotch, Ron starts to talk. He explains that as Jerry and April left to work for Leslie, and Tom and Donna left to run their own businesses, he didn't recognize anyone in the Parks department anymore. This hit him harder than he thought, and so despite his deep hatred for government and authority, Ron made a conscious decision to ask Leslie for a job under the federal government. He had gone to visit her at her office and they had made plans to have lunch the next day, where he would have asked her for that job. However, Leslie's busy schedule caused her to forget their plans, and she had stood him up for lunch. Leslie is horrified to find out about this, and apologizes to Ron. Ron reassures her that it wasn't entirely her fault, and tells her he regrets being petty and bitter about it afterwards. They make up.

8:00 am

Ben, Tom, April, Andy, Terry, Donna, and Craig return to the office to find drunk Leslie and Ron dancing and playing the saxophone to "We Didn't Start the Fire," with the office furniture rearranged to the way it used to be five years prior.

Later, Ron offers Leslie a peace offering, a photo of the two of them ensconced in a frame made of wood from Ann's old house's front door, and they leave to have lunch together.

== Production ==
This episode was written by series co-creator Michael Schur and directed by Beth McCarthy-Miller. In an interview with Entertainment Weekly, Schur revealed that the story for the episode had been one of the first plots developed for the season. He explained that the ensemble nature of the show did not allow many of the actors to "strut their stuff as much as you would like", so he decided to write an episode to showcase the acting abilities of both Amy Poehler and Nick Offerman. He picked the two characters to base this episode around because their relationship had "always been the center of the show in many ways; the philosophical center and emotional center of the show." The two of them thus represented "the yin and yang" in regards to their opinions on government. As such, this episode—which Schur likened to a two-person play—was crafted so as to allow the two characters to sit in a single room and simply talk to one another.

In an interview with HitFix, Schur later explained the reason why Leslie and Ron's fallout made sense: "We decided to do it because it seemed like the juiciest conflict that would reasonably have sprung up [....] we have always talked about Leslie and Ron's friendship being helped by their proximity, and their constant contact. It's a lot harder to just write off people who are different from you when you see them every day and talk every day, and therefore find inevitable points of overlap (like breakfast food). Were that proximity to disappear, it seemed natural that Leslie and Ron could drift apart a little."

Offerman later revealed that he and many other members of the staff were worried about how fans would react to the episode's rather serious story. While Parks and Recreation had made heavy use of emotional scenes in the past, "Leslie and Ron" marked one of the first times that an entire episode would largely be built around a non-comedic plot or set piece. Offerman noted that "when we did a couple of the more emotional scenes, they felt good and right, but I looked around at everyone and said, 'Is that OK if we do that? I think that was dramatic, guys.'" Despite this hesitation, Offerman welcomed the chance to act dramatically.

== Cultural references ==
Leslie complains to Ben in the beginning that being locked up with Ron would mean she would miss that night's Game of Thrones episode, where "Khaleesi is marrying Jack Sparrow." Leslie attempts to sing along to Billy Joel's "We Didn't Start the Fire", but, because she does not know the lyrics, she makes up her own which reference Harry Truman, the United States, "Red China", Joe Mantegna, Ian McKellen, Freddy Krueger, Oprah, and Peter Piper. Leslie and Ron attempt to flag down a janitor, but he cannot hear them over "Man! I Feel Like a Woman!" by Shania Twain, which he is listening to through headphones. Leslie and Ron put the parks department back in order while "Buddy" by Willie Nelson, which was mentioned earlier in the episode as one of Ron's favorite songs, plays. Leslie tells Ron that she bought him his land mine shell off eBay. When Ron is describing meeting Leslie for the first time, he says her political compass is "slightly to the left of Leon Trotsky".

== Reception ==
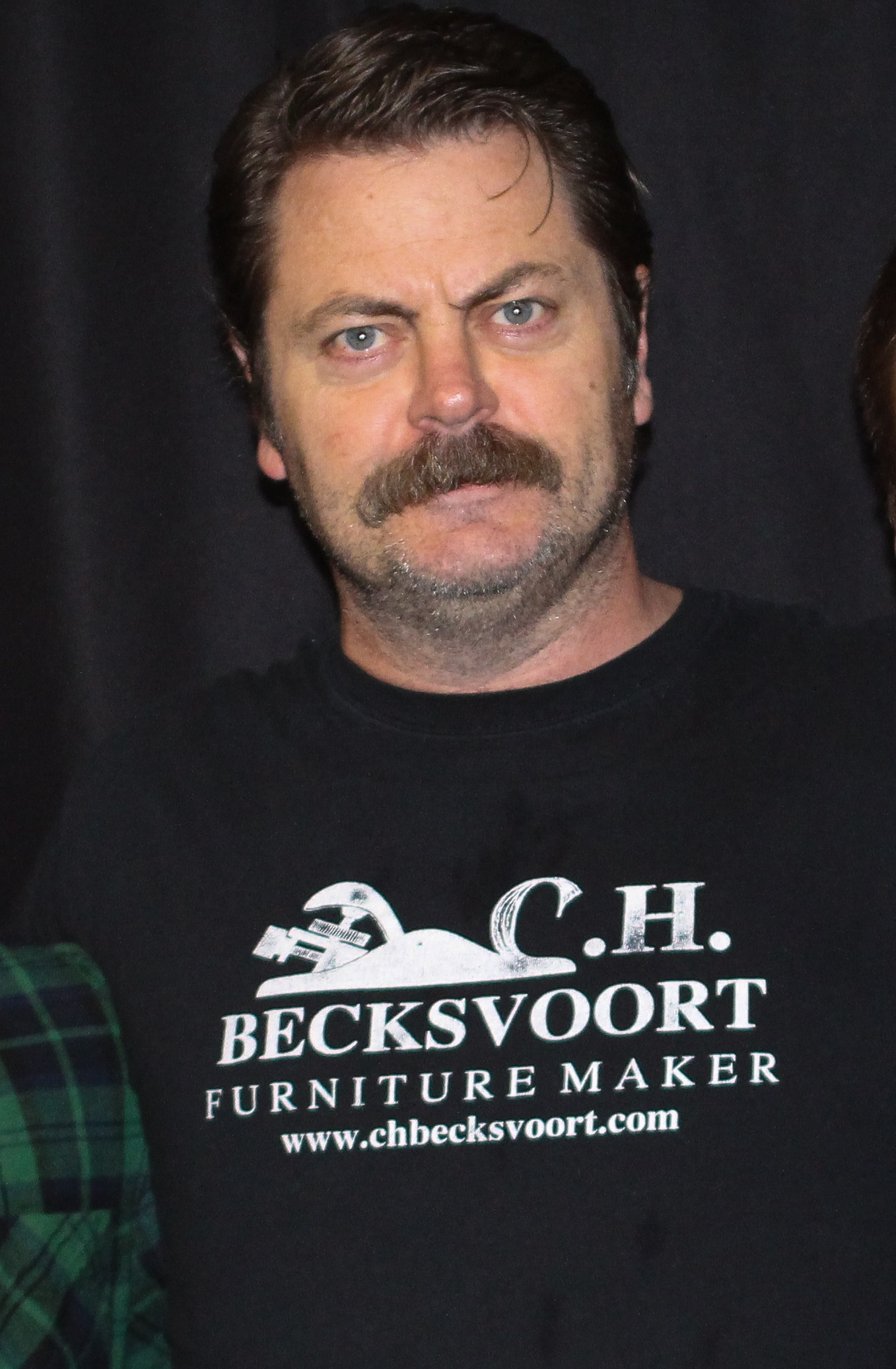
Nick Offerman's performance received widespread critical acclaim

"Leslie and Ron" aired on January 20, 2015, immediately following the previous episode "William Henry Harrison". The episode was seen by 3.3 million viewers, and earned a 1.4 Nielsen rating in the 18- to 49-year-old demographic. Nielsen ratings are audience measurement systems that determine the audience size and composition of television programming in the United States, which means that the episode was seen by 1.4 percent of all households aged 18 to 49 years old were watching television at the time of the episode's airing.

The episode received largely positive reviews from television critics. Alasdair Wilkins of The A.V. Club awarded the episode an "A", calling it "an emotional triumph for Parks And Recreation". He felt that the episode was able to successfully conclude the four-episode arc concerning Ron and Leslie's feud in a way that was highly emotional. Wilkins praised the performances of Offerman and Poehler, writing that the episode "is a virtual two-hander between the old workplace proximity associates, with not a single other person … spotted outside of the flashbacks for the vast majority of the episode." Particular praise was directed towards Offerman, whom Wilkins noted "projects such quiet heartache in those flashbacks; his body language and his shuffling gait suggest a man far removed from Ron’s usual hyper virility."

IGN writer Matt Fowler awarded the episode a 9.5 out of 10, denoting an "amazing" episode. He applauded the way the show was able to bring Leslie and Ron back together, noting that the episode "not only put Humpty Dumpty back together again by having Leslie and Ron return to being friends, but it got us there in a genuinely moving way." He was complimentary towards Poehler and Offerman's acting, and he selected Leslie's attempt at singing "We Didn't Start the Fire" and Leslie and Ron putting the department back in order while "Buddy" played in the background as the two highlights of the episode.

Television reviewer Alan Sepinwall felt that "Leslie and Ron" complemented the previous episode, "William Henry Harrison", because, whereas "William Henry Harrison" was ensemble-based and highly comedic, "Leslie and Ron" was much more rooted in the title characters, their struggle, and their emotions. Sepinwall wrote positively that Ron was portrayed "as vulnerable as he has ever been in the run of this show", and that Offerman should submit this episode for an Emmy consideration. Ultimately, Sepinwall felt that the episode "is "wacky, it's sad, [and] it's sweet (particularly the montage of them restoring the original parks department decor, set to Ron's mix CD choice, Willie Nelson's "Buddy")".

The Atlantic named "Leslie and Ron" one of the best television episodes of 2015.
