= I'll Love Away Your Troubles for Awhile =

Single by Janie Fricke

from the album Love Notes
- B-side: "River Blue"
- Released: February 1979
- Genre: Country
- Label: Columbia
- Songwriter(s): Johnny MacRae, Bob Morrison
- Producer(s): Billy Sherrill

Janie Fricke singles chronology
"Playin' Hard to Get" (1978)	"I'll Love Away Your Troubles for Awhile" (1979)	"Let's Try Again" (1979)

"I'll Love Away Your Troubles for Awhile [sic]" is a song written by Johnny MacRae and Bob Morrison, and recorded by American country music artist Janie Fricke. It was released in February 1979 as the second single from the album Love Notes. The song reached #14 on the Billboard Hot Country Singles chart, her second top twenty hit in the United States.

== Chart performance ==
Chart (1979)	Peak position
US Hot Country Songs (Billboard)	14
CAN RPM Country Singles	7
