= Alan Haynes =

American Texas blues guitarist (born 1956)

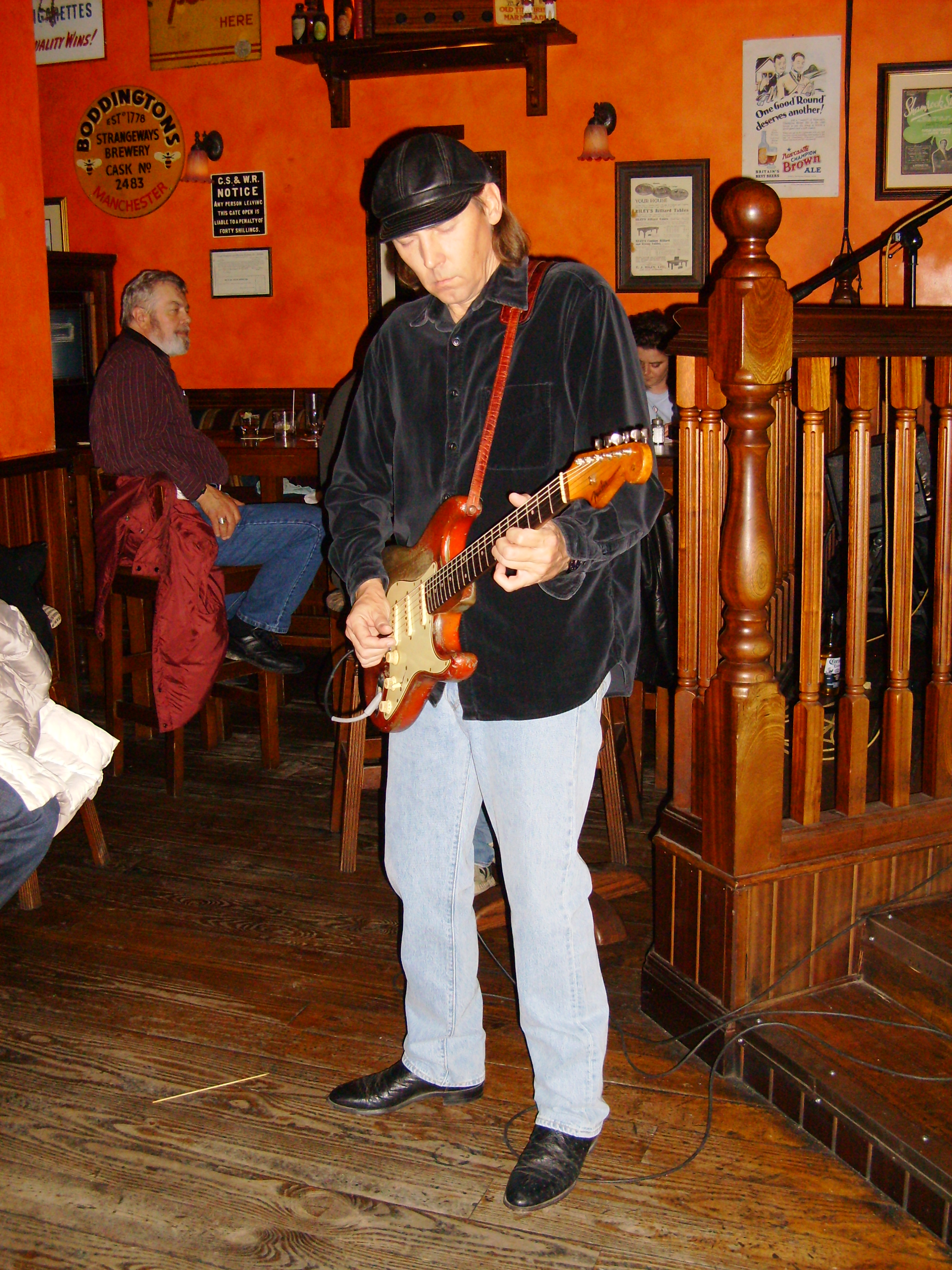
Haynes playing at BD Riley's in 2007

Alan Haynes (February 19, 1956), born in Houston, Texas, is an American Texas blues guitarist. Haynes has been playing professionally since the 1970s and has performed with a variety of blues musicians that include Stevie Ray Vaughan, Johnny Winter, Albert Collins, Albert King, The Fabulous Thunderbirds (1980's version with Jimmie Vaughan), Robert Cray, Bonnie Raitt, John Lee Hooker, and Otis Rush among others. He now resides in Austin, Texas, and plays locally in and around Texas' major cities, especially Houston (where he performs the last Saturday of every month at The Big Easy Social & Pleasure Club), occasionally in Dallas and Fort Worth, and also Europe, where he has a following in Scandinavian countries, Germany, Denmark and Israel.

== Life and career ==
=== Early life ===
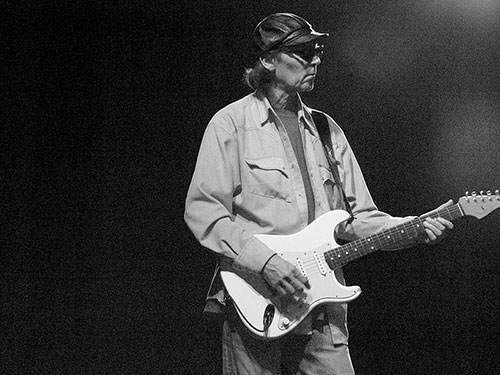
Haynes in Aarhus, Denmark 2014

Haynes started playing guitar at the age of eight and approached the blues for the first time when he was about 12. Among the first influences he had were B. B. King, Freddie King, and Albert King, as well as fellow Houston native Albert Collins. By the age of 16, Haynes decided to dedicate himself to the blues.

=== Adult life and career ===
In the late 1970s, Haynes joined the Texas Boogie Band as a second guitarist but eventually became the main guitarist. He moved to Austin, Texas in the early 1980s. While playing with the Texas Boogie Band, Haynes got to open and share the stage with Muddy Waters. Haynes and the Texas Boogie Band were, by that time, the house band at the Texas Opry House, also getting radio broadcasting in Houston (on 101KLOL). Haynes would later lead his own band, "Alan Haynes and the Stepchildren" and release his first EP, "Seventh Son" in 1984 under the Orphan label. Stepchildren included Uncle John Turner, who had played with Johnny Winter during the late 1960s and early 1970s, and recorded albums. Haynes was inducted into the "Buddy magazine Texas Tornado List" in 1980 and his band was voted "Best Blues Band" by the "Music City Austin - Music Poll" in 1985. Later on, for about six years in the 1990s, Haynes was the house band at Antone's. During those years, in 1994, Haynes released his second studio album, Wishing Well. This time he had life friends and former Stevie Ray Vaughan and Double Trouble rhythm sections Chris Layton on drums, Tommy Shannon on bass, and Reese Wynans on keyboards. Haynes also counted on Preston Hubbard from the Fabulous Thunderbirds and George Rains (Jimmie Vaughan's drummer) for this album. The result earned Haynes a featured article in the Guitar Player in August 1995. He continued playing locally and in Europe and recorded two more albums on his own, but this time capturing the emotions of live performances. These two, Live at the Blue Cat Blues recorded in Dallas in 1998 with Jim Suhler, and Live at the Big Easy recorded in Houston in 2001, were Haynes' last works to date.

== Style and technique ==
Haynes' style is a soulful mix of Texas blues that includes musical ideas from different genres, essentially jazz and southern country. Haynes' tone is relatively clean and very clear as he uses no effects between his guitars and amps. The use of different dynamics and long, intense jams after singing a few verses has been a constant throughout his career. Haynes is also well known for being a master of slide guitar and usually plays a few tunes with the slide in his regular sets. Haynes' playing style is also denoted by precision on his bends, a wide range and variety of licks and tight rhythms that he achieves through complex chord-arrangements. Another component of his playing is his heavy and masterful use of his fingers to play (instead of a pick, which he also uses) and several pickup switches while playing licks and chords that allows him to achieve different sounds.

== Musical influences ==
Haynes' main influence is Johnny Winter, who he was introduced to at the age of 15 by fellow Houstonian, Benny Valerio. This influence is evident in both his fluent and aggressive playing and growling vocals which he tends to harmonize with his guitar. Albert Collins is another big influence that can be traced on Haynes's bends and vibratos as well as his fresh tone. Others that have influenced his career and style are Albert King, Muddy Watters, Freddie King, B. B. King, T-Bone Walker, and Lightnin' Hopkins.

== Equipment ==
Haynes sound is characterized by a warm tone achieved by playing vintage Strats through vintage Fender amps. His main guitar is a 1960 Fender Stratocaster with a C-Profile rosewood fret board and Dakota Red body. It was previously owned by Stevie Ray Vaughan and prior to him, it belonged to Eric Johnson. The guitar has also been played by Billy Gibbons, Carlos Santana and Johnny Winter. Pickups on this guitar are stock and therefore have a vintage sound. His favorite amp setup includes a Fender Vibroking and an Ibanez Tube Screamer Mini. Previously a heavy strings user (11's and 12's), Haynes now employs any 10-46 set of strings and prefers standard tuning.

== Discography ==
=== Studio albums ===
- Seventh Son (1984)
- Wishing Well (1994)

=== Live albums ===
- Live at the Camelot Club, Tel Aviv, Israel Not Official (w/ the Ronnie Peterson band, Recorded in 1998)
- Live at the Blue Cat Blues (w/Jim Suhler, Recorded in 1998, Released in 2000)
- Live at the Big Easy (Recorded in 2001, Released in 2002)
- Gregg Rolie Live At The Iridium (feat. Alan Haynes) (Released on September 25, 2012)

=== Contributions ===
- José Blues (1988) David Lindholm
- Tribute to Elmore James (1996) Masters of Blues
- Telephone Road Houston, TX (1997) Mark May
- Preaching the Blues (1998) Preacher Keen
- Texas Minded (1998) The Tubesnakes
- Before I Go (1999) The Bluesknights
- Gulf Coast Blues (1999) Uncle John Turner
