= But Love Me =

1978 easy listening song

Song by Kenny Nolan

from the album A Song Between Us
- Released: 1978
- Genre: Easy listening
- Length: 3:08
- Label: Polydor
- Songwriter: Kenny Nolan
- Producer: Kenny Nolan

"'But Love Me'" is a song written and originally recorded by Kenny Nolan. It appeared on his 1978 album before being recorded by American country artist Janie Fricke. Her version was released as a single via Columbia Records in October 1979 and charted on the American country songs survey in 1979.

== Kenny Nolan version ==
American musician Kenny Nolan had become a successful producer and songwriter in the 1960s. He had ambitions to become a recording artist himself and had a pop hit single in 1976 with "I Like Dreamin'". It was included on a self-titled album and he later released his 1978 studio album called A Song Between Us. Included on the album was the self-penned track "But Love Me". The song was produced by Nolan himself and was only issued as an album track when A Song Between Us was issued. Los Angeles session musicians, including Steve Lukather, David Paich, Jeff Porcaro, and David Hungate of Toto fame, were fired during the production of this song for changing the title of the track from But Love Me to Butt Love Me. Steve Lukather discusses this in his book “The Gospel According To Luke” as well as his interview with the Sunset Sound Recorders. This interview is available on YouTube.The song and album were both issued on Polydor Records in 1978.

== Janie Fricke version ==
"But Love Me"

Single by Janie Fricke

from the album From the Heart
- B-side: "One Piece at a Time"
- Released: October 1979
- Recorded: August 1979
- Studio: Columbia (Nashville, Tennessee)
- Genre: Country-pop
- Length: 2:59
- Label: Columbia
- Songwriter: Kenny Nolan
- Producer: Billy Sherrill

Janie Fricke singles chronology
"Let's Try Again" (1979)	"But Love Me" (1979)	"Pass Me By (If You're Only Passing Through)" (1980)

Janie Fricke would have a series of charting singles on the American country chart in the late 1970s including "But Love Me". It was produced by Billy Sherrill at the Columbia Studios in Nashville, Tennessee in August 1978.

Fricke's version of the song was released as a single on Columbia Records in October 1979. It was backed on the B-side by "One Piece at a Time". It was issued as a seven inch vinyl single. The song climbed to number 26 on the America's Billboard Hot Country Songs chart in January 1980 after 13 weeks on the list. The song was later included on Fricke's third studio album From the Heart (1979).

=== Track listing ===
7" vinyl single

- "But Love Me" – 2:59
- "One Piece at a Time" – 2:52

=== Charts ===
Chart performance for "But Love Me"
Chart (1979–1980)	Peak position
US Hot Country Songs (Billboard)	26
