= Pass Me By (If You're Only Passing Through) =

Song written by H.B. Hall

Single by Johnny Rodriguez

from the album Introducing Johnny Rodriguez
- B-side: "Jealous Heart"
- Released: October 1972
- Recorded: September 1972
- Studio: Mercury Custom (Nashville, Tennessee)
- Genre: Country
- Length: 2:30
- Label: Mercury
- Songwriter: H.B. Hall
- Producer: Jerry Kennedy

Johnny Rodriguez singles chronology
"Pass Me By (If You're Only Passing Through)" (1972)	"You Always Come Back (To Hurting Me)" (1973)

"Pass Me By (If You're Only Passing Through)" is a song written by H.B. Hall that has been recorded multiple times. It was originally recorded and released as a single by American country and Latin singer Johnny Rodriguez. His version of the song became a top ten in North America. In 1980, it was released as a single by American country artist Janie Fricke, whose version reached the top 40 in North America.

== Background and recording ==
Johnny Rodriguez was discovered in Texas by Bobby Bare and Tom T. Hall. In a short period of time, Rodriguez signed a recording contract with Mercury Records and started releasing music shortly afterward. In his first recording sessions, Rodriguez cut "Pass Me (If You're Only Passing Through)", a song composed by H.B. Hall. Along with two other selections, the song was cut at the Mercury Custom Studio in Nashville by producer Jerry Kennedy. The session was held in September 1972.

== Release and chart performance ==
A month after his recording session, Mercury released "Pass Me By (If You're Only Passing Through)" as a single in October 1972. It was backed on the B-side by a cover of the song "Jealous Heart". The single was originally issued as a seven inch vinyl record. The single spent 18 weeks on the Billboard Hot Country Songs chart, peaking at number nine in January 1973. In Canada, the single also reached the top ten of the RPM Country chart, climbing to number seven. Rodriguez's commercial success made him the first Latin-American person to have a top ten hit single on the country charts. "Pass Me By" was released on his debut studio album on Mercury called Introducing Johnny Rodriguez (1973).

== Track listing ==
7" vinyl single

- "Pass Me By (If You're Only Passing Through)" – 2:30
- "Jealous Heart" – 2:06

== Chart performance ==
Chart performance for "Pass Me By (If You're Only Passing Through)"
Chart (1972–1973)	Peak position
Canada Country Songs (RPM)	7
US Hot Country Songs (Billboard)	9

== Other versions ==
"Pass Me By (If You're Only Passing Through)" has been covered by multiple artists since its original release. In 1973, Lynn Anderson recorded a version that appeared on her studio album Keep Me in Mind. The same year, versions were cut by several more artists including Wanda Jackson and Connie Smith. In 1974, it was recorded by George Jones for his studio album The Grand Tour Among other cover versions was by Canadian artist Paul Brandt whose version appeared on his 1996 album Calm Before the Storm.

=== Janie Fricke version ===
"Pass Me By (If You're Only Passing Through)"

Single by Janie Fricke

from the album From the Heart
- B-side: "This Ain't Tennessee and He Ain't You"
- Released: January 1980
- Recorded: August 1979
- Studio: Columbia (Nashville, Tennessee)
- Genre: Country
- Length: 2:58
- Label: Columbia
- Songwriter: H.B. Hall
- Producer: Billy Sherrill

Janie Fricke singles chronology
"But Love Me" (1979)	"Pass Me By (If You're Only Passing Through)" (1980)	"He's Out of My Life" (1980)

Janie Fricke would later become among the most commercially successful female artists in country music during the 1980s. Yet in the 1970s, she was still trying to find her musical identify after signing a contract with Columbia Records in 1977. Among her early singles was a cover of "Pass Me By (If You're Only Passing Through)". It was produced by Billy Sherrill at the Columbia Studios in Nashville in August 1979.

Fricke's version of the song was released as a single on Columbia Records in January 1980. It was backed on the B-side by "This Ain't Tennessee and He Ain't You". It was issued as a seven inch vinyl single and reached number 22 on America's Billboard Hot Country Songs chart after 12 weeks on the list. On Canada's RPM Country Songs chart, it reached the top 20, peaking at number 19. The song was later included on Fricke's third studio album From the Heart (1979).

Track listing 7" vinyl single

- "Pass Me By (If You're Only Passing Through)" – 2:58
- "This Ain't Tennessee and He Ain't You" – 3:57

Charts

Chart performance for "Pass Me By (If You're Only Passing Through)"
Chart (1980)	Peak position
Canada Country Songs (RPM)	19
US Hot Country Songs (Billboard)	22
