= One Last Ride =

- Parks and Recreation episodes
- Episode nos.: Season 7 Episodes 12, 13
- Directed by: Michael Schur
- Written by: Michael Schur; Amy Poehler
- Production code: 712/713
- Original air date: February 24, 2015

Guest appearances
- Rashida Jones as Ann Perkins; Rob Lowe as Chris Traeger; Ben Schwartz as Jean-Ralphio Saperstein; Christie Brinkley as Gayle Gergich; Alison Becker as Shauna Malwae-Tweep; Mara Marini as Brandi Maxxx; Jenny Slate as Mona Lisa Saperstein; Kathryn Hahn as Jennifer Barkley; Helen Slayton-Hughes as Ethel Beavers; Henry Winkler as Dr. Saperstein; Natalie Morales as Lucy; Marc Evan Jackson as Trevor Nelsson; Joe Biden and Jill Biden as themselves

Episode chronology
← Previous "Two Funerals"	Next → "A Parks and Recreation Special"
- Parks and Recreation season 7

"One Last Ride" is the two-part series finale of the television sitcom Parks and Recreation. It serves as the 12th and 13th episodes of the seventh season and the 124th and 125th overall episodes of the series. It was written by lead actress Amy Poehler and series co-creator Michael Schur, who also directed the episode. The series finale first aired on NBC in the United States on February 24, 2015, when it was watched by 4.15 million viewers, making it the most-watched episode of the season and the highest-rated episode since "Campaign Ad" of the fourth season.

With the majority of the season being spent closing long-running storylines, the episode serves as both a standalone plot and a farewell to the characters and the city of Pawnee. The episode received acclaim from critics.

== Plot ==
=== Present (2017) ===
The gang all gather inside the parks department before business hours, as many of them are leaving Pawnee, to reminisce about their time together there. A citizen comes in, saying that a swing set behind his house on a playground has been broken for about three months. Leslie (Amy Poehler) sees this as an opportunity for them all to go on one last mission together as she is worried these people will never be together again in the same room at the same time. The gang agrees, with Leslie saying goodbye to everyone on the way to getting it fixed. After fixing the swing, the group gathers for a picture together and Ben asks Leslie if she is ready. In the last shot of the series, Leslie smiles at the camera, and says "Yes. I'm ready."

=== The Future ===
Following his interim term, Garry (Jim O'Heir) is officially elected mayor after a massive write-in campaign. In 2019, Craig (Billy Eichner) continues to work at Tom's Bistro, where he is reintroduced to Typhoon, Donna and Ron's hairdresser. The two are soon married (with Ron as their best man) and live a long and happy life together. Elsewhere, Tom (Aziz Ansari), now married to Lucy (Natalie Morales), decides to franchise his restaurant after careful consideration, only to lose almost all his money due to an economic recession. However, his experiences with failure inspire him to write a book, and he becomes a successful self-help author and motivational speaker.

In Washington D.C. in 2022, Andy (Chris Pratt) longs to be a father despite wife April's (Aubrey Plaza) reluctance. However, with advice and support from Leslie and Ben (Adam Scott), April reconsiders and comes round to the prospect of motherhood. Elsewhere, Jean-Ralphio (Ben Schwartz) and his sister Mona-Lisa (Jenny Slate) fake the former's death so they can use the life-insurance money to flee the country and fund a casino in Tajikistan, but are caught spying on Jean-Ralphio's "funeral". After resigning from the Very Good Building Company amidst its outstanding performance, Ron (Nick Offerman) visits Leslie in Washington for guidance, as he is at a personal crossroads. Leslie offers him the superintendency of the Pawnee National Park; he accepts, officially making peace with working for the federal government, and spends his days patrolling the parkland. In 2023, Donna (Retta) and Joe (Keegan-Michael Key) are living happily in Seattle, where Donna's real-estate firm is thriving due to a resurgence in the housing market, but teacher Joe is despondent after the increasingly streamlined national curriculum cuts math. With her commission money and help from April, Donna sets up an online learning initiative called "Teach Yo' Self", allowing Joe to stay true to his values in teaching. On October 31, 2023, Andy supports a fully costumed April as she gives birth to their first child, Jack, in Pawnee's hospital.

At the Biden family home in 2025, Leslie is approached about running for the governorship of Indiana, while Ben is simultaneously approached by Jennifer Barkley (Kathryn Hahn) about the same position. To decide which one of them should run, they head back to Pawnee for inspiration, where they find the entire gang – and their respective children – gathered at the Parks department to support them, including Ann (Rashida Jones) and Chris (Rob Lowe). While there, April and Andy reveal they are having another child, and Ann and Chris announce that they are moving back to Pawnee. Leslie and Ann are also secretly conspiring to spark a romance between their teenaged children, Oliver and Sonia, and the plan appears to be succeeding. Ben and Leslie still cannot decide who will run, and decide to officially consult their friends; however, as they prepare to announce their news, Ben tells everyone that it is Leslie who will be running, as he knows she has dreamed of being in executive government her entire life. Leslie immediately reappoints him as her campaign manager, and notes that they (like Ann and Chris) can now return to living full-time in Pawnee.

In 2035, Leslie makes a commencement speech at Indiana University during her second consecutive term as Governor of Indiana. The university announces the renaming of its library after Leslie; she is privately unimpressed by the gesture due to her long-standing antipathy towards Pawnee's library department.

In 2048, an elderly Leslie and Ben attend Garry's funeral; he was repeatedly named mayor of Pawnee until his death on his 100th birthday. The two are surrounded by Secret Service members, implying that one, or both, of them is either President or Vice President of the United States. Leslie is disgruntled when Ben observes that Garry's wife Gayle (Christie Brinkley) is still stunningly beautiful. After the funeral, the couple notice that the inscription on Garry's tombstone misspells his last name, but neither cares enough to inform anyone of the mistake.

=== Producer's cut ===
In the producer's cut of the episode, Shauna Malwae-Tweep's (Alison Becker) and Jeremy Jamm's (Jon Glaser) futures are explored. In 2018, Shauna's fiancé leaves her at the altar, and Bobby Newport (Paul Rudd) sees her crying on a park bench. Shauna and Bobby end up getting married five hours later. In 2020, Jamm is working in a hibachi restaurant in Florida.

== Final frame ==
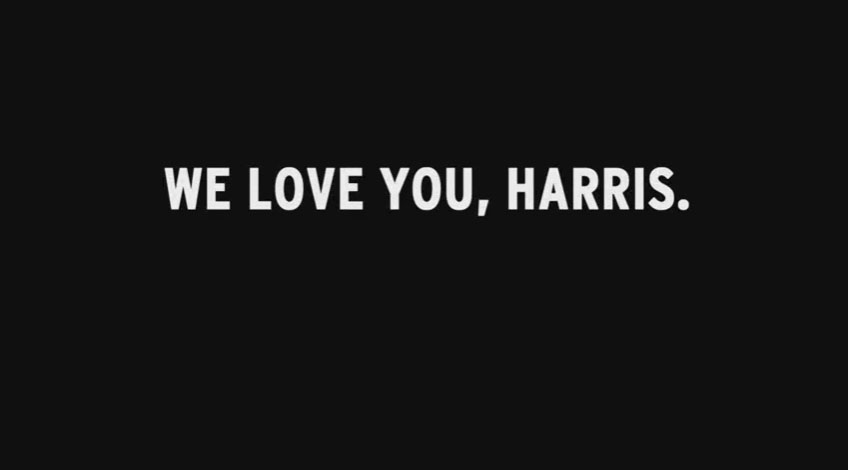
The final frame of the series finale of Parks and Recreation, which aired on February 24, 2015, featured a message to Wittels.

The episode aired a few days after the death of writer and producer Harris Wittels, who also appeared on the show as dim-witted animal control employee Harris. The final frame of the series featured the message, "We love you, Harris," from the cast and crew.

== Reception ==
=== Ratings ===
The episode received ratings of 4.15 million viewers, almost double the average number per episode.

=== Critical response ===
The episode received overwhelming acclaim from critics and fans alike. IGN gave the episode a 10 out of 10, calling it a "masterpiece". Additionally, Alasdair Wilkins of The A.V. Club gave the episode an "A" rating, stating that "the experience of watching 'One Last Ride' was something [he's] not sure [he's] ever had before with a television show", praising the phenomenal end to the series. HitFix's Alan Sepinwall also admired the episode, stating that "after this great final season, and this wonderful final episode, [he] remain[s] very much not ready for a future without Parks and Recreation, even though it ended so definitively, and so well". The episode holds an "Extremely Positive" consensus on Metacritic, the highest calibre of reviews an episode can receive on the database.

== Accolades ==
Ceremony	Category	Recipient(s)	Result
67th Primetime Emmy Awards	Outstanding Lead Actress in a Comedy Series	Amy Poehler	Nominated
67th Primetime Emmy Awards	Outstanding Sound Mixing for a Comedy or Drama Series (Half-Hour) and Animation	George Flores, John W. Cook II, William Freesh	Nominated
