= 2017 (Parks and Recreation) =

- Parks and Recreation episode
- Episode no.: Season 7 Episode 1
- Directed by: Dean Holland
- Written by: Alan Yang; Matt Murray
- Original air date: January 13, 2015

Episode chronology
← Previous "Moving Up"	Next → "Ron and Jammy"
- Parks and Recreation season 7

"2017" is the season premiere of the seventh season of the American comedy television series Parks and Recreation, and the 113th overall episode of the series. It originally aired on NBC in the United States on January 13, 2015.

In this episode, Leslie (Amy Poehler) battles Ron (Nick Offerman)'s new business, "Very Good", for land from the Newport family to build a National Park. Meanwhile, April (Aubrey Plaza) becomes concerned that she and Andy (Chris Pratt) have become a boring, mainstream married couple.

== Plot ==
Three years after the previous episode, Ron has started his own construction company. He has Donna and Tom join the company, which Leslie dislikes, among other things, which starts a feud between the two.

== Reception ==
"2017" received mixed reviews from critics. Alasdair Wilkins of The A.V. Club awarded the episode a "B." Wilkins accused the show of prioritizing the characters' line of work more than the inner conflicts of characters, in comparison to the departure of Steve Carell in the seventh season of The Office. They also stated that Leslie and Ron's conflict over Morning Star did not feel like a proper season starter, saying "there’s really no doubt, based on everything we’ve ever seen of Parks and Recreation, that the two are going to make their peace. In fairness, it might be unrealistic to expect genuine uncertainty on that point, as even comedies far more mean-spirited than this would almost certainly have their main characters reconcile before the final bow."

IGN's Matt Fowler praised the episode as a fantastic beginning to the final season, stating "It wasn't enough to just stick with the time jump that we all saw at the tail-end of last season, but the whole show dynamic is different, with most every character having moved on from anything Parks related." He also described the plot of Leslie and Ron competing over the Newport Property as a positive conflict for the show to end on, as well as praising the new mixing of the character personalities that solidified the new time jump.
