= Al Stricklin =

American musician (1908 – 1986)

- Born: Alton Meeks Stricklin; January 29, 1908; Antioch, Texas, United States
- Died: October 15, 1986 (aged 78); Cleburne, Texas, United States
- Occupation: pianist
- Years active: 1935–1986
- Spouses: Arbutus Watson (m. 1930; died 1941) Betty Jozeigler (m. 1943)
- Children: 3
- Parents: Zebedee Meeks Stricklin; Annie Stricklin
- Musical career
- Genres: Jazz, Western swing
- Instrument: piano
- Label: Edsel Records

Alton Meeks Stricklin, better known as Al Stricklin (January 29, 1908 – October 15, 1986), was an American pianist. Nicknamed "Brother Al" or "Piano Pounder", he was known for his participation in Bob Wills' band Texas Playboys from 1935 to 1942, and performances on several of the band's classic recording, including "New San Antonio Rose", "Steel Guitar Rag", and "Take Me Back to Tulsa".

== Early life ==
Stricklin was born in Antioch, Johnson County, Texas, United States. His parents were Zebedee Stricklin and Annie Stricklin. He started to learn playing piano at the age of four, with instruction from his father. According to Stricklin himself, the famed jazz pianist Earl "Fatha" Hines was a major inspiration for his music style.

After graduating high school in Grandview, Stricklin enrolled in the Weatherford Junior College in 1927. During his time in school, he made subsistence earning by holding piano lessons. In 1929, he attended Baylor University, where he studied in History Major. He performed with two bands, a jazz group called The Texans and a Dixieland band named the Rio Grande Serenaders. Due to his involvement in a jazz band called Unholy Three, Stricklin was put under suspension. It was only under the intervention of a dean named W. Sims Allen that Stricklin was not expelled.

== Career ==
During the Great Depression, Stricklin left school and joined KFJZ radio station as an assistant program director in 1930. He was responsible for auditioning performance by Bob Wills' band, and initially thought that they were performing parody music. Will's performance turned out to be a success, and the band later played as Aladdin Laddies in WBAP under the sponsorship of Aladdin Lamp Company.

Stricklin and his wife moved to Tulsa in 1931. Soon after they moved to Island Grove, Texas, where Stricklin was employed as an elementary school teacher and principal. In 1934, he also played with the Hi Flyers dance band in Fort Worth. Stricklin joined Texas Playboys in 1935, with a weekly wage of $30. He played in Wills's first recording session for Columbia Records in September.

In 1941, his wife Arbutus Watson died of cancer. Following the U.S. entry of the World War II, Stricklin left Texas Playboys and worked under a defense contractor called North American Aircraft. In 1942. He declined a reunion with the band in 1943. He still joined some of the band's performance in the ensuing decades.

In 1973, Bob Wills called for the recording of the album For the Last Time, and Stricklin joined the recording under request from the label company United Artists. After Wills' death in 1975, Stricklin and other members of the band performed as Bob Wills Original Texas Playboys for a decade. He briefly pursued a solo career. In 1976, he authored the memoir "My Years With Bob Wills".

In 1984, Stricklin was diagnosed with bone cancer. He made his last public performance on April 12, 1986 at the Fort Worth Stockyards' White Elephant Saloon. On October 15 of 1986, Stricklin died of cancer in Fireside Lodge Nursing Center Cleburne, Texas.

In 1999, Stricklin was inducted into the Rock and Roll Hall Of Fame along with the rest of the Texas Cowboys. Joseph Dulle dedicated a piano played by him to the White Elephant in Fort Worth exhibit.
