= Baby It's You (Janie Fricke song) =

Single by Janie Fricke

from the album Singer of Songs
- B-side: "I Loved You All the Way"
- Released: February 1978
- Recorded: November 1977
- Studio: Columbia Studio
- Genre: Country-pop
- Length: 2:42
- Label: Columbia
- Songwriter(s): Thomas Gmeiner; John Greenebaum
- Producer(s): Billy Sherrill

Janie Fricke singles chronology
"What're You Doing Tonight" (1977)	"Baby It's You" (1978)	"Please Help Me, I'm Falling" (1978)

"'Baby It's You'" is a song written by Thomas Gmeiner and John Greenebaum, and recorded by American country music artist Janie Fricke. It was released in February 1978 as the second single from her debut studio album Singer of Songs. The song was her second solo single release and made chart positions in both the United States and Canada.

== Background, recording and release ==
Janie Fricke signed with Columbia Records in 1977 and released her first single the same year called "What're You Doing Tonight". The song would be followed a series of top 40 charting songs in the late 1970s, including "Baby It's You". The track was composed by Thomas Gmeiner and John Greenebaum. It was produced by Billy Sherrill at the Columbia Studio in November 1977.

In February 1978, "Baby It's You" was released as a single on Columbia Records. It was backed on the B-side by "I Loved You All the Way". It was issued as a seven inch vinyl single and was the second solo single released in Fricke's career. It became Fricke's second single to reach the American Billboard Hot Country Songs chart. Spending 12 weeks on the survey, the single peaked at number 21 in April 1978. On Canada's RPM Country Songs chart, the single became her second top 20 charting entry. "Baby It's You" was later included on Fricke's debut studio album called Singer of Songs (1978).

== Track listing ==
7" vinyl single

- "Baby It's You" – 2:42
- "I Loved You All the Way" – 3:17

== Charts ==
Chart performance for "Baby It's You"
Chart (1978)	Peak position
Canada Country Songs (RPM)	19
US Hot Country Songs (Billboard)	21
