= Claude Hall =

American journalist and writer

Claude Hall (September 4, 1932 – July 7, 2017) was an American journalist and a writer for and longtime radio-TV editor of Billboard.

Born in Brady, Texas, Hall coined in 1965 the term "easy listening" to describe the sound of WPIX-FM, a radio station then heard in metropolitan New York City.

Hall was the author of the e-book "Radio Wars", which was published in 2012. He died in Las Vegas at age 84.
