= Phil Baugh =

American singer-songwriter (1936–1990)

Background information
- Born: December 13, 1936
- Origin: Marysville, California
- Died: November 4, 1990 (aged 53)
- Genres: Country
- Occupation: Session musician
- Instrument: Guitar
- Years active: 1960s-1980s
- Labels: Longhorn, Era
- Formerly of: Nashville Superpickers

Phil Baugh (December 13, 1936 – November 4, 1990) was an American guitarist. He was known as one of the leading hot country guitarists whose "playing exuded joy and humor." He was active from the 1960s through the 1980s, performing as a highly sought-after session musician as well as a top recording artist in his own right.

== Biography ==
Phil Baugh was born in Olivehurst, California in 1936. Baugh signed a deal with Crest Records in 1962. With promotion from Longhorn Records in Dallas, Texas his song "Country Guitar" became a hit. He then recorded an album called Country Guitar II as a follow-up. He continued to work in Southern California, including joining Ray Price's band in 1969. In 1975 he moved to Nashville where he became a popular session guitarist. In the 1980s he was part of a country/jazz band called The Nashville Superpickers. The lineup included steel guitarist Buddy Emmons, drummer Buddy Harman, bassist Henry Strzelecki, pianist Willie Rainsford and harmonica player Terry McMillan. He suffered a coronary in 1985 and died five years later at the age of 53.

Baugh's "Country Guitar" and "One Man Band" were top 40 hits on Billboard's country chart during 1965.

== Guitars ==
Phil Baugh was one of the great country Fender Telecaster players along with James Burton and Don Rich. The entire album "Live Wire!" was recorded with his signature heavily customized Telecaster. But he also had other guitars, including a custom made doubleneck guitar from Mosrite and a Chet Atkins model Gretsch.

== Discography ==
Live Wire!

=== Albums ===
Year	Album	US Country	Label
1965	Country Guitar	4	Longhorn
1969	California Guitar	—	Era
1975	Country Guitar II	—	Toro
2005	Live Wire!	—	Sundazed

=== Singles ===
Year	Single	US Country	Album
1965	"Country Guitar"	16	Country Guitar
1965	"One Man Band"	27	Country Guitar

== Awards ==
- "Best Guitarist" by the ACM 1965
- "Outstanding Instrumentalist of the Year" by Billboard 1965
- "Instrumentalist of the Year" by Cash Box 1965
- Nominated for a Grammy Award in 1979 for his performance with The Nashville Superpickers on The Austin City Limits

== See also ==
- List of Telecaster players
