= Dewey Groom =

American recording artist

- Born: April 30, 1918
- Died: March 31, 1997 (aged 78)
- Labels: Imperial, Longhorn, Thunderbird
- Formerly of: Dewey Groom And His Texans, Dewey Grooms and his Texas Longhorns

Dewy Groom (April 30, 1918 – March 31, 1997) was a recording artist and record label owner. He also owned and ran the Longhorn Ballroom, an iconic country western dance hall in Dallas, Texas.

== Background ==
During the 1940s Groom played at clubs owned by Jack Ruby, a man he referred to as his friend. After the second world war, Groom went into club management as a means to showcase his own musicianship.

In 1950, he opened the Bounty Ballroom. In 1958, he moved his operation to the former Bob Wills Ranch House, where The Longhorn was operated. The Longhorn nearly became the site for the filming of Urban Cowboy, but Gilley's with its larger space became the final choice. As a country music artist who played guitar and bass, he had worked with Howdy Forrester and Georgia Slim.

== Career ==
In 1949, he and his band had a single "Can't Win For Losing You" bw "Butane Blues" released on the Imperial label. It was credited to Dewey Grooms and his Texas Longhorns. In July, 1971, his single "Sentimental Journey" bw "What Will My Mary Say" was released on Thunderbird TH 542.

In 1960, he acquired the Longhorn Records label which had releases by Clay Allen and Billy Gray.

In 1986 after 25 years, Groom shut down his Longhorn Ballroom club.

== Death ==
Groom died in 1997 at the age of 78.
