= What're You Doing Tonight =

Single by Janie Fricke

from the album Singer of Songs
- B-side: "We're a Love Song"
- Released: August 1977
- Recorded: June 1977
- Studio: Columbia Studio
- Genre: Country-pop
- Length: 2:49
- Label: Columbia
- Songwriter: Bob McDill
- Producer: Billy Sherrill

Janie Fricke singles chronology
"What're You Doing Tonight" (1977)	"Baby It's You" (1978)

"What're You Doing Tonight" is the debut single by American country music artist Janie Fricke. Written by Bob McDill, the song was released in August 1977 and reached chart positions in both the United States and Canada. It was the first single from Fricke's debut album Singer of Songs.

== Background and recording ==
Janie Fricke had gone from a studio background singer and commercial jingle performer to a recording artist in 1977. After being heard on a single by country artist Johnny Duncan, she signed her own contract with Columbia Records in 1977. Under the production of producer Billy Sherrill, Fricke recorded her first single "What're You Doing Tonight". It was composed by Nashville songwriter Bob McDill. The song was recorded at the Columbia Studio in Nashville, Tennessee under the direction of Sherrill. The session took place in June 1977. Also cut during the same session was the track "We're a Love Song".

== Release, chart performance and reception ==
In August 1977, "What're You Doing Tonight" was released as a single on Columbia Records. It was backed on the B-side by Fricke's self-composed tune "We're a Love Song". It was issued as a seven inch vinyl single and was the debut single released in her career. It became Fricke's first single to reach the American Billboard Hot Country Songs chart. Spending 13 weeks on the survey, the single peaked at number 21 in November 1977. On Canada's RPM Country Songs chart, the single reached the top 20, peaking at number 14. "What're You Doing Tonight" was later included on Fricke's debut studio album called Singer of Songs. The album was released on Columbia in May 1978. At the 20th Annual Grammy Awards, Fricke was nominated for Best Female Country Vocal Performance. She would be nominated three more times for the same award in her career.

== Track listing ==
7" vinyl single

- "What're You Doing Tonight" – 2:49
- "We're a Love Song" – 3:17

== Charts ==
Chart performance for "What're You Doing Tonight"
Chart (1977)	Peak position
Canada Country Songs (RPM)	14
US Hot Country Songs (Billboard)	21

== Accolades ==
Year	Nominee / work	Award	Result	Ref.
1978	20th Annual Grammy Awards	Best Female Country Vocal Performance	Nominated	
