= Longhorn Ballroom =

Music venue in Dallas, Texas, U.S.

Coordinates: 32.7598°N 96.7926°W

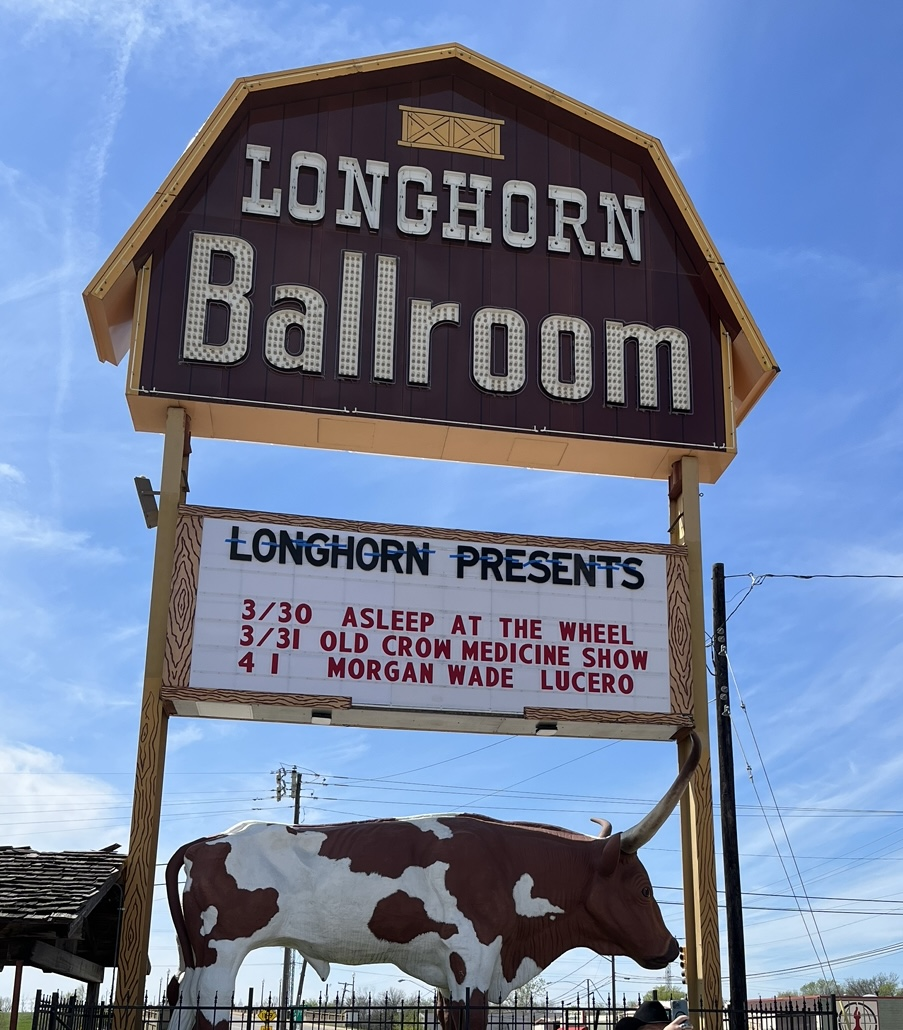
The Longhorn Ballroom Marquee, March 2023

The Longhorn Ballroom in Dallas, Texas (USA) has been called, Texas' Most Historic Music Venue and since its inception has had a colorful set of proprietors. Originally built by O.L. Nelms, an eccentric Dallas millionaire, for his close friend, western swing bandleader Bob Wills, the venue opened in 1950 as Wills' Ranch House. When Wills left In the early 50s Nelms leased the sprawling venue to notorious nightclub owner turned assassin Jack Ruby. Mr. Ruby eventually had a nervous breakdown and lost the lease, but he is credited with hosting some of the best black entertainers of the day including Count Basie, Ruth Brown, and Nat King Cole. The Nat King Cole show took place in 1954 in the racially segregated Jim Crow South, where an affluent black audience sat in front, in the premium seats, while the white patrons stood in the back to listen to the legend.

In 1957, the venue was divided into two separate performance areas by a single wall. One area, named the “Guthrey Club” featured Rhythm and Blues artists such as Little Richard, Fats Domino, Bo Diddley, and Roy Orbison, while the bigger ballroom focused on Country Music.

In 1958, O.L. Nelms sold the business and in 1967 sold the property to his close friend and business partner Dewey Groom who renamed the venue The Longhorn Ballroom. Groom, who was also a recording artist, and record label owner, successfully ran the ballroom for more than 25 years, adding the iconic Longhorn Ballroom marquee. In 2022, Groom was honored posthumously with the Pioneer award by the Texas Country Music Hall of Fame.

The venue hosted a wide variety of acts from country legends such as, Merle Haggard, Patsy Cline, Johnny Cash, Charley Pride, George Jones, Tammy Wynette, Ray Price, Conway Twitty, Bob Wills, Loretta Lynn, Hank Thompson, Willie Nelson and Patsy Montana . But also Ray Charles, B.B. King, Millie Jackson, Al Green, and James Brown are just a few of the soul and blues acts who played the Longhorn Ballroom stage on Monday Service Industry Nights at the venue.

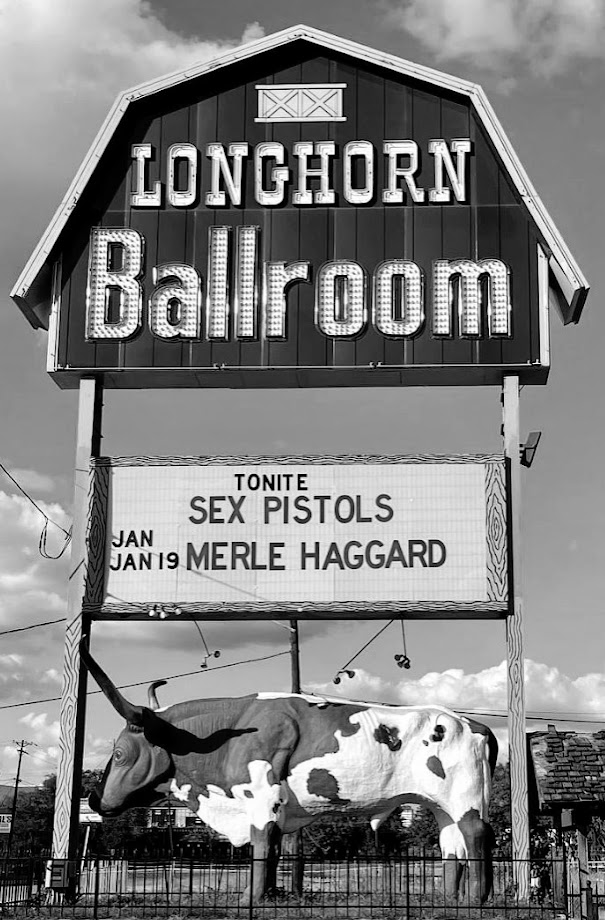
1978 Marquee

On January 10, 1978 it achieved brief infamy in international music circles when the Sex Pistols appeared there and during their performance taunted the audience, resulting in someone throwing a beer bottle and breaking Sid Vicious's nose, and he continued to play with blood running down his chest. Before the Sex Pistols, the venue hosted mainly country music artists including Charley Pride, George Jones, Tammy Wynette, Ray Price, Conway Twitty, Bob Wills, Loretta Lynn, Hank Thompson, Willie Nelson and Patsy Montana. A photo of the venue's marquee listing both the Sex Pistols and Merle Haggard concerts on consecutive nights added to the lore.

The Bob Wills concert album, "The Longhorn Recordings" featuring the music of Bob Wills and his steel guitar player Gene Crownover was recorded in the early Sixties at Longhorn Ballroom. One of the two music videos for Aerosmith's 1989 single "What It Takes" was filmed at the Longhorn Ballroom.

In 1980, Loretta Lynn, The Academy of Country Music's 1970s Artist of the Decade, starred in "50 Years of Country Gold," a television special that was broadcast live from the stage of the Longhorn Ballroom. Johnny Cash and George Strait made their debuts at the Longhorn in the 80's, as well as five-time Grammy winner, La Mafia. The tradition of offering a wide range of musical genres continued as Butthole Surfers, The Flaming Lips, Ramones, Motorhead and Red Hot Chili Peppers all performed at the Longhorn. In 1986, African trumpet player and human rights activist, Fela Kuti played his final Dallas show at the Longhorn Ballroom. One of the two music videos for Aerosmith's 1989 single "What It Takes" was filmed at the Longhorn Ballroom.

The Longhorn Ballroom returned to brief infamy in 1990, when 2 Live Crew refused to go on stage for a scheduled show, resulting in fights among their fans and police.

Dallas soul stalwart Johnnie Taylor released a live video filmed at the Longhorn in 1997.

Bobby Patterson, who claims in the introduction to his KKDA radio show to be "able to leap the Longhorn Ballroom in a single bound," recorded a live album there in 2002.

From October 1996 to February 2017 it was owned and operated by Raul and Rosalinda Ramirez who also operated the restaurant Raul's Corral Mexican Restaurant adjacent to the ballroom. In 2017, restorations were made to the historic venue and it reopened for a time as a special events venue then closed in 2019 due to the Covid-19 pandemic.

The Longhorn Ballroom was purchased out of bankruptcy in 2022 and reopened March 30, 2023 with Asleep at the Wheel. In attendance for the reopening were the Ramirez’s as well as the families of Dewey Groom and Bob Wills. On March 31, 2023, the venue hosted Old Crow Medicine Show, with a guest appearance by Robert Earl Keen. On April 1, 2023, Morgan Wade and Lucero played the newly reopened stage.

After an 18 month designation process the Longhorn Ballroom was recognized with an official listing on the National Register of Historic Places on February 1, 2024. Proprietor Edwin Cabaniss made the announcement from the stage as the ballroom hosted Bob Wills’ Texas Playboys, under the direction of Jason Roberts. The crowd included representatives from the Bob Wills Foundation, The Texas Dance Hall Preservation, the Texas Music Office as well as three generations of the Wills family. D Magazine covered the announcement, here.

== See also ==
- National Register of Historic Places listings in Dallas County, Texas
