= Mojo bag =

Magical amulet bag in Hoodoo tradition

A mojo bag (/ˈmoʊdʒoʊ/), in the African American spiritual tradition called Hoodoo, is an amulet consisting of a flannel bag containing one or more magical items. It is a "prayer in a bag", or a spell that can be carried with or on the host's body. Alternative American names for the mojo bag include a toby, lucky hand, nation sack, conjure bag, and a package. Other forms of African American amulet bags include the gris-gris and juju bags.

With an origin among the Kongo people in Central Africa, the word mojo also refers to a form of conjure, Hoodoo, and charm work. Mojo containers have been fashioned as bags, gourds, jars, bottles, shells, and canes. The making of mojo bags is a system of African American occult magic that involves housing charms or spirits inside of a bag for protection and healing. Other times mojo bags are created to manifest results in a person's life, such as good-luck, money or love.

== Etymology ==
The word mojo is derived from the Kikongo word mooyo, meaning "to the spirits that dwelt within magical charms." It refers to the cavity of a nkisi, where magical items are normally stored.

=== Semantic change of the word ===
While the word mojo refers to magic and a conjure bag in traditional Gullah spirituality, it underwent a semantic change in American popular culture at the beginning of the twentieth century and came to refer to sexuality and virility. Musicians began to use the word mojo outside of its original context within African American culture. Mojo has also come to mean motivation in general.

== History and ideology ==
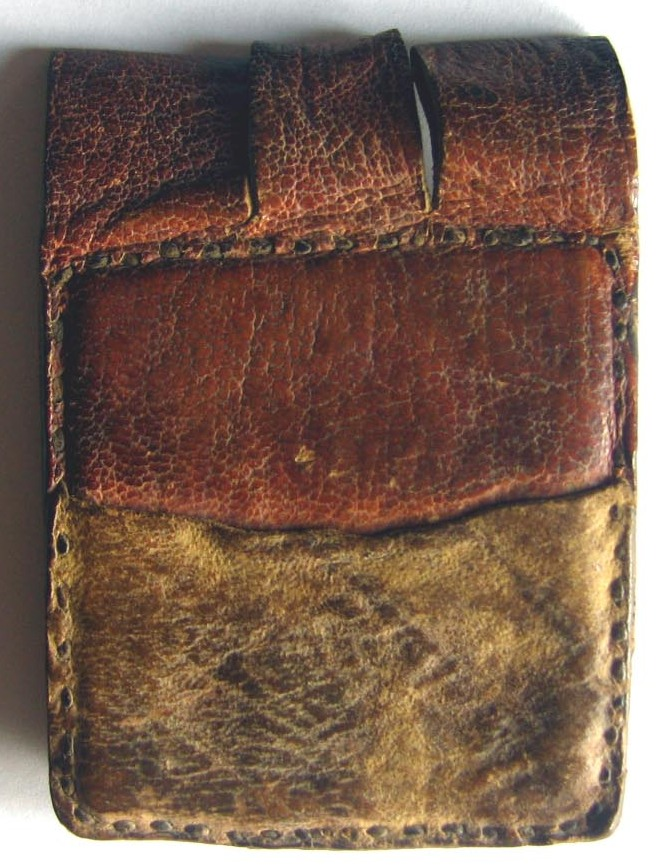
A West African Tuareg gris-gris

Central and West Africans practiced the spiritual art of creating conjure bags for protection, healing and to communicate with spirits. Historians of the time noted that they were frequently worn by non-believers and believers alike, and were also found attached to buildings. The word conjure is considered by some to be an alternative to the word mojo. Because of this, a mojo bag is also referred to as a conjure bag and hoodoo bag, usually made by a respected community conjure doctor.

=== Central African influence ===
The Bakongo people of the Congo River region created medicine bags using leather or cloth and placed feathers, animal parts, roots, herbs and other ingredients for protection. When Bakongo people were enslaved in the United States, the practice transitioned continued in African American communities and became an essential custom in Hoodoo tradition. Mojo items were hung from trees, tied to a string, worn underneath the clothes in hopes of achieving the desired outcome for the user.

The nkisi is one example of a mojo container made by hand from a root doctor. Spirits are contained in a bag, gourd, shells and other containers. Nkisi bags, which looked similar to mojo bags, are believed to be an ancestor of the mojo bags in American Hoodoo. The spiritual philosophy of the mojo bag also has Bakongo influence. In traditional Bakongo religion, simbi spirits can inhabit an nkisi bag for healing or protecting an individual or a community. The Nganga creates the bag for an individual using ingredients specific to a certain simbi to invoke it into the bag.

In the U.S., these Nganga conjurers were easily identified by the way they dressed, their demeanor, and charms, by the mojo bags worn by the individual. Some practitioners concealed their charms while others, who were in the business of conjure, sometimes wore their charms and mojo bags on the outside of their clothes.

=== West African variations ===
In West Africa, similar conjure bags are called juju and gris-gris. The word juju comes from the Hausa language, while gris-gris has origins in Mande communities and is associated with Afro-Islamic mystical traditions. The practice of using gris-gris was translocated to the United States with enslaved Africans and was incorporated by practitioners of Louisiana Voodoo and Hoodoo in the United States. Originally the gris-gris was adorned with Islamic scripture and was used to ward off evil, djinn spirits or bad luck. The Mandinka people were the first Muslim ethnic group imported from Sierra Leone to the Americas. They were known for their conjure bags called gris-gris and carried the talismans with them when they boarded slave ships heading to the Americas. Enslaved Muslims were sought out for conjure services requesting them to make gris-gris bags for protection against their enslavers and other dangers.

=== American adaptation ===
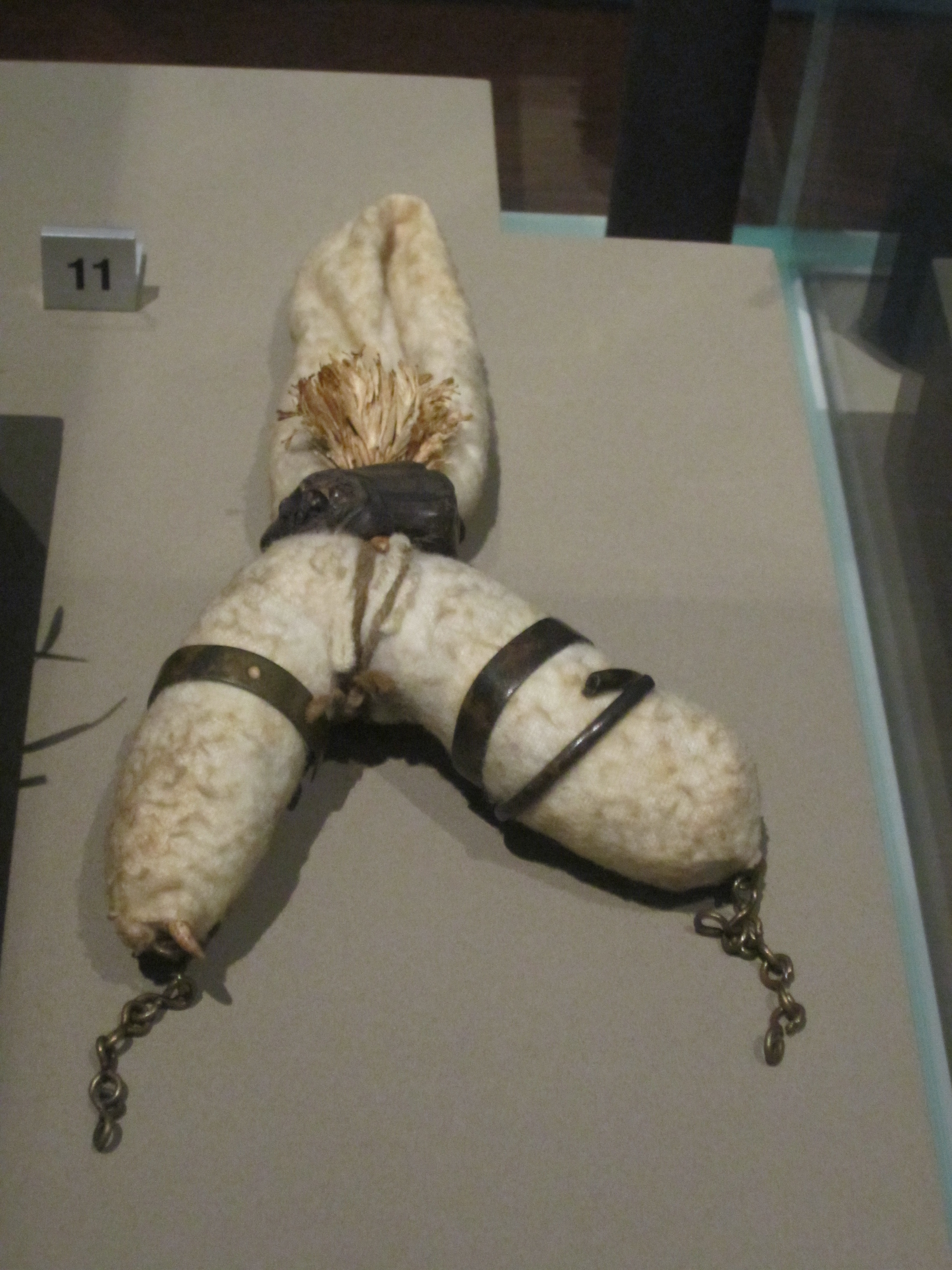
Minkisi (Kongo - Central Africa), World Museum Liverpool - Minkisi cloth bundles were found on slave plantations in the United States in the Deep South. Minksi bundles influenced the creation of mojo bags in Hoodoo.

During the Atlantic slave trade, some enslaved Africans were able to conceal their conjure bags before they boarded slave ships heading to the Americas. Gullah Jack, an enslaved man from Angola, carried a mojo bag onto a slave ship leaving Zanzibar and brought it with him to the United States. Even after he arrived, he was known for carrying mojo for his spiritual protection.

Those principles of Bakongo religion that early Africans, like Gullah Jack, reinforced are what influenced the later creation of mojo bags in the United States for centuries to come. Certain natural and animal ingredients, such as animal bones, animal teeth, claws, and graveyard dirt were deemed necessary to contain a simbi spirit or an ancestral spirit inside of the bag for protection and healing. With the weaving of traditional African concepts, such as the Bakongo cosmogram, Kongo Christianity, Native American herbalism, American Protestantism, and Hoodoo tradition, African Americans were able to reimagine and reshape the mojo bag to address their new needs in a new land. However, beliefs were maintained, with Black people in the American South also observing the connection between the Christian cross and the Bakongo cosmogram. The cross continued to be viewed as an nkisi that harnessed the spirit of Jesus on the cross that could be invoked in rituals for healing or protection and for the removal of sorcery.

In the United States, mojos are used to ground spirits in certain locations to prevent the spirits of the dead from coming back and haunting the living by placing the last items they touched on top of their graves. The last items touched by the dead are also placed inside mojo bags to carry the spirit of the deceased with the living for protection. A mojo can be a bottle-tree charm, spirit jugs or memorial jugs to capture spirits inside containers to house their spirit to later work with the spirit in rituals.

Archeologists in New York discovered continued West-Central African burial practices in a section of Lower Manhattan, New York City which is now the location of the African Burial Ground National Monument. Historians and archeologists found Kongo related artifacts at the African Burial Ground such as minkisi and nkisi conjure bundles buried with African remains. These nkisi and minkisi bundles became the conjure bags in Hoodoo.

At Hermitage plantation in Nashville, Tennessee, archeologists discovered continued Central African traditions of using hexagonal glass beads for fertility and other spiritual purposes. Other charms found were mojo hands, lucky roots, raccoon penis bones, ceramics, and blue beads. These items found in a slave cabin showed enslaved African Americans used local roots and created mojo hands for protection and healing. Enslaved African Americans at Hermitage plantation used prehistoric artifacts for charms to draw spiritual power from ancient artifacts. In addition, archeologists found Kongo cosmograms engraved onto limestone marbles for spiritual power. The charms were used to protect from conjure and remove sorcery and reverse curses back onto the conjurer. The knowledge of charm bags was shared and passed down orally amongst people in the slave community.

The word hand in this context is defined as a combination of ingredients. The term may derive from the use of finger and hand bones from the dead in mojo bags, or from ingredients such as the lucky hand root, which was favored by gamblers. The latter suggests an analogy between the varied bag ingredients and the several cards that make up a hand in card games. Like their ancestors, African Americans continued to use mojo, believing it would provide protection and favor.

== Making a mojo ==
Most Southern-style conjure bags are made of red flannel material. The use of red flannel bags for mojo bags was influenced by the Bakongo people's minkisi in Central Africa, and in Hoodoo red symbolizes protection from evil and spiritual power. Research from the National Museum of African American History and Culture explained that the color red symbolizes sacrifice, transition and power in countries where the belief in mojo was common, such as the Democratic Republic of the Congo, the Republic of Congo and Gabon. Other times when red cloth was not available, African Americans used whatever cloth they had to create a conjure bag. The contents of each bag vary directly with the aim of the conjurer. For example, a mojo carried for love-drawing will contain different ingredients than one for gambling luck or magical protection. Ingredients can include graveyard dirt, roots, herbs, animal parts, minerals, coins, crystals, good luck tokens, and carved amulets. The more personalized objects are used to add extra power because of their symbolic value.

To house spirits of the dead inside mojo bags, jars, packets, and other containers and charms, graveyard dirt from a deceased person's burial plot is used. Spirits of the dead can protect a person from physical and spiritual harm. The conjurer prepares the graveyard dirt with certain incantations, prayers, Biblical or Quranic scriptures and other ingredients to instruct the spirit to heal or protect a person. Historians have traced this practice to the Bakongo people, who utilized graveyard dirt to house spirits of the dead, animal spirits, or ancestral spirits inside conjure bags for healing or protection. African Americans during slavery and freedom combined Native American herbal knowledge with African spirituality. Enslaved and free Africans upon arrival to the United States used North American herbs, and roots to create conjure bags. However, they applied an African interpretation in the preparation of herbal ingredients by creating nkisi and performing African religious rituals in the preparation of spiritual medicines.

A former slave from Texas said to make a conjure bag African Americans "would take hair and brass nails and thimbles and needles and mix them up in a conjure bag." Prince Johnson, a former slave from Mississippi, said his slaveholder would inspect her slaves to make sure they did not have any charms underneath their clothes. An oral account from Patsy Moses, a former slave from Texas, mentioned the use of red flannel cloth to make conjure bags using frog bones to protect from an enemy. Other Texas slave narratives showed that red flannel cloth was commonly used to make mojo bags incorporating frog bones, snake skins, and roots to protect from their enemies and remove curses. Some mojo bags were made to cause harm and bad luck for slaveholders, and other mojo bags were for protection depending on the ingredients used by the root worker. William Webb made mojo bags for enslaved people in Kentucky to keep the peace between the enslaved and their enslavers. Webb instructed the enslaved to gather roots from their local environment and place them in conjure bags and pray over them to keep the spiritual magic of the mojo bags active.

=== Uses of mojo ===
There are records of African American ministers and church members in Black churches in Virginia and South Carolina were known by the members of their congregation and in the slave community to conjure spirits, speak to the spirits of the dead and carry and make mojo bags. After the American Civil War, some African American ministers and church members continued to rely on Hoodoo and make mojo bags and saw no contradiction in their practice with Christianity. One African American church minister relied on a conjurer to make him a mojo bag to attract more members to his church. For four years, the minister relied on the mojo bag to increase the membership of his church. Every Sunday, the church pews were filled. After four years, the minister did not feel comfortable depending on the spirit of a mojo bag and not the Christian God to grow his church. The minister threw away the mojo bag; when he did, people stopped coming to his church. These written accounts showed that African Americans who identified as Christian continued to believe and practice African spirituality and some African American Christians relied on Hoodoo when experiencing tough times in life.

Conjurers made money making and selling mojo bags as a full-time business. Dr. Jim Jordan was a conjure doctor in North Carolina and became a multi-millionaire by providing conjure services to people all over the United States during the Jim Crow era. He owned a conjure Hoodoo store and provided medicinal and spiritual healing to his clients using charms and herbal remedies. Another version of a mojo bag is a prayer cloth. Prayer cloths are white church cloths imbued with spiritual power from a pastor of a church. A pastor prays over the cloth speaking the power of God into the cloth with prayer and anointing of Holy Oil and functions like a mojo bag. Church members take prayer cloths with them in their purses or placed under their beds for protection. This modified version of a mojo bag is mostly found in African American churches.

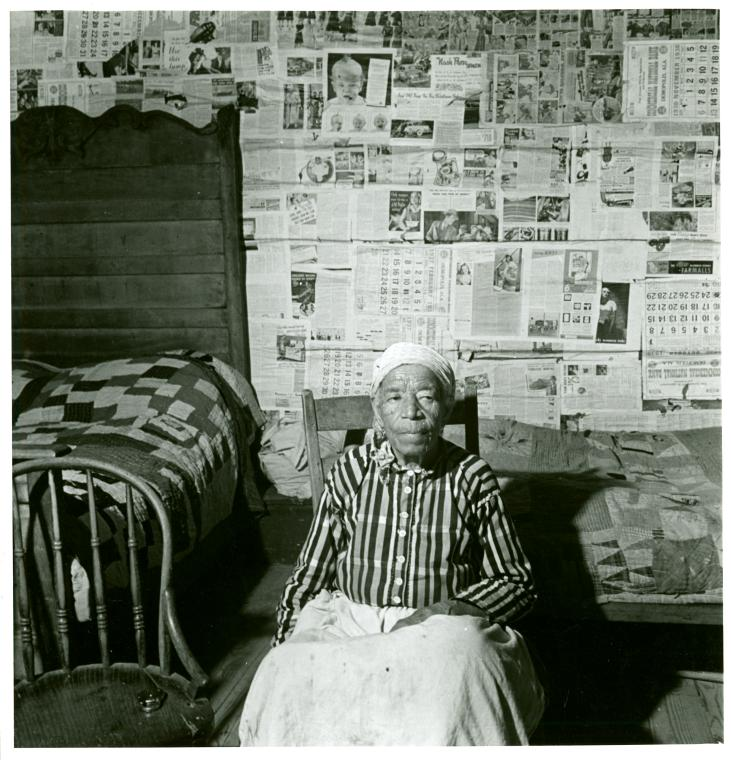
African American women sewed charms and mojo hands into their quilts for spiritual protection. Newspaper is placed on the walls to ward off evil spirits.

The creation of mojo bags in Hoodoo is a Central African practice brought to the United States by enslaved Africans. A few enslaved Africans brought their conjure bags (mojo bags) with them from Africa when they boarded slave ships heading to North America. African American quilt makers sewed mojo hands into quilts for protection. This practice originates among Central African peoples such as the Bakongo, who adapted the practice of nkisi into the creation of the "Pineapple quilt," which establish the widespread technique from Mississippi and Alabama to Connecticut. Enslaved on plantations and continued to practice their traditions by sewing mojo hands into their quilts.

On slave plantations in the United States, the creators of mojo became the root workers, conjure doctors, and Hoodoo doctors in enslaved and free African American communities. Enslaved and free black root workers created mojo bags and placed Bible verses, petition papers, roots, herbs, animal parts, graveyard dirt, and other ingredients to conjure a negative or positive effect. They used either Christian prayers to spirituality charge the mojo bag. During slavery, many of the mojo bags created were for protection against a harsh slaveholder. The petition papers placed inside a mojo bag can have either a Bible verse, symbols, and other characters to conjure a positive or negative magical result. After the Civil War, mojo bags were created in Black American communities for protection from law enforcement, to attract love, protection, money, employment, or to communicate with spirits. Folklorist Newbell Niles Puckett documented a mojo practice of an African American cook in the Mississippi Delta. The African American cook had a mojo bag with a "lizard's tail, rabbit's foot, a fish eye, snake skins, a beetle, and a dime with a hole in it." This mojo bag was worn by the cook for good-luck.

Other conjure bundles in the hoodoo tradition are hanged on the side of the door or beds where people sleep to protect from conjure. Conjurers made a goofer bag with goofer-root, cloth, strands of hair, needles, and graveyard dirt. To add potency to conjure bundles the hair from a camel was added. It is believed that walking over a buried mojo bag would "goofer" the individual. Black conjure women make mojo bags for their female clients to prevent their men from having sexual relationships with other women.

Traditionally, a client consulted with a root worker to know what kind of mojo he or she needed as not all mojos are the same, as one mojo can not work for everyone. Each person needs a different mojo. In traditional Hoodoo, if there are several people needing love, the root worker or conjurer created different mojos for each of their clients. One mojo created the same can not work for everyone. By the twentieth century, Hoodoo was culturally appropriated by white merchants that profited from Black spiritual culture. Spiritual shops sold the same mojo to their customers. In traditional Hoodoo, certain songs, prayers, symbols, and ingredients are used to conjure or manifest results. After Hoodoo was appropriated, the same mojo was sold to consumers. "For Hoodoo practitioners looking to sell their goods, it has therefore become more profitable to rely 'on stereotypes of…[H]oodoo to attract their primarily white clientele' (ibid.) than to promote the sale of historically accurate ritual objects that appeal to modern, African American practitioners of Hoodoo. Additionally, white shop owners seem to dominate the mainstream Hoodoo market, undermining the ability of African American people to rely on their religious beliefs to assure their economic empowerment."

African American practitioners from the Millennial and Gen Z generations are incorporating new techniques such as the use of various crystals in the creation of mojo bags and using tarot cards for divination to consult with spirit. The creation of mojo bags is an individualized practice based on regional ingredients and ingredients purchased in stores and online.

== Maintenance ==
Gris-gris by Charles Gandolfo

=== Fixing and feeding a mojo hand ===
There is a process to fixing a proper mojo. A ritual must be put in place in order to successfully prepare a mojo by being filled and awakened to life. This can be done by smoking incense and candles, or it may be breathed upon to bring it to life. Prayers may be said, and other methods may be used to accomplish this essential step. Once prepared, the mojo is "dressed" or "fed" with a liquid such as alcohol, perfume, water, or bodily fluids. The reason it is said to feed the mojo to keep it working is that it is alive with spirit. One story from the work entitled From My People describes a slave who went out and sought a mojo conjurer that gave him a mojo to run away from home. The story describes the slave's mojo as fixing him into many formations, and he ultimately dies because he misuses its power. Had he fixed and believed in the specific mojo himself, he might have escaped the plantation alive.

=== Hiding the mojo ===
Mojos are traditionally made for an individual and so must be concealed on the person at all times. Men usually keep the trinkets hidden in the pants pocket, while women are more prone to clip it to the bra. They are also commonly pinned to clothes below the waist. Depending on the type of mojo, the hiding place will be crucial to its success, as those who make conjure bags to carry love spells sometimes specify that the mojo must be worn next to the skin. A story from the book From My People described the story of Moses and the task he went through to bring his people out of slavery. It described how "Hoodoo Lost his Hand," as Moses's mojo was hidden through his staff. When he turned it into a snake, the pharaoh made his soothsayers and magicians create the same effect. As a result, the Pharaoh's snake was killed by Moses's snake, and that is how Hoodoo lost his hand.

== Depictions in art ==
=== Music ===
Mojo bags were are portrayed in Blues. Blues is a genre of music created in the United States by African Americans in the mid-nineteenth century that incorporates spirituals, African American work songs, slave shout songs, field hollers and call-and-response. Several blues singers created songs about mojo bags. Lightening Hopkins has an album called Mojo Hand. Will Shade and the Memphis Jug Band performed a song titled "Aunt Caroline Dyer Blues." The lyrics of the song speak of a man going to Newport, Arkansas to see Auntie Caroline. She's described as a fortune-telling woman, who can whip him up a mojo bag, so that he can strut his stuff around town and not live so rough. Johnny Temple also wrote his 1937 hit "Hoodoo Woman" about Auntie Caroline's legendary mojos. The lyrics of him standing on a mountain in Jerusalem, Arkansas and then going to Newport, Arkansas to seek a mojo from her.

In Robert Johnson's 1937 song "Come On in My Kitchen," he describes losing his woman as a result of stealing coins from her nation sack. The Preston "Red" Foster penned song "Got My Mojo Working," recorded by Ann Cole in 1956 and by Muddy Waters the following year, spoke about the spiritual power of the mojo bag. Junior Wells released an album in 1965 called Hoodoo Man Blues. In the title song, Wells explained that he traveled to Louisiana and saw a Hoodoo practitioner to make him a mojo bag to get back his girlfriend who had left him for another man.

=== Writing ===
==== Zora Neale Hurston ====
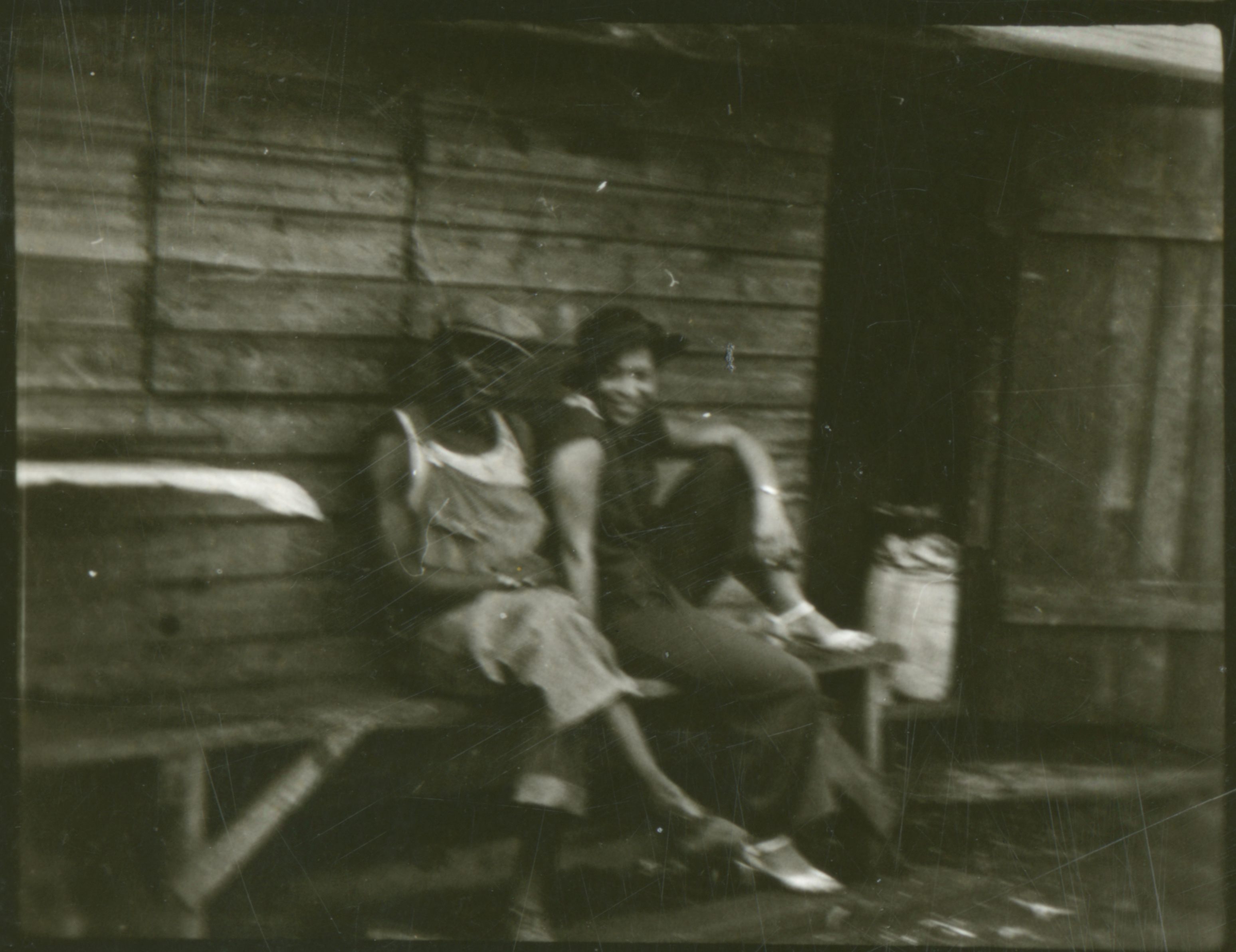
Zora Neale Hurston documented mojo culture in African American communities in Florida and Louisiana.

In the 1930s, Zora Neale Hurston documented African Americans in the South creating mojo bags using roots, herbs, and animal parts in the Hoodoo tradition. In 1935, Hurston published what she learned about mojo culture in her book titled, Mules and Men.

==== Slave narratives ====
In the 1930s, the Federal Writers' Project part of the Works Progress Administration during the Great Depression, provided jobs for unemployed writers to write and collect the experiences of former slaves. Writers, black and white, documented the experiences of the last generation of African Americans born into slavery. Former African American slaves told writers about their slave experience which provided readers a glimpse into the lives of the enslaved. Slave narratives revealed the culture of African Americans during slavery. African American former slaves talked about conjure, rootwork, and Hoodoo. These narratives revealed how enslaved African Americans made mojo bags for protection against their enslavers and conjure. Other slave narratives explained how African Americans in slavery and freedom made mojo charms to stop nose bleeds and reverse and prevent illness. The Library of Congress has 2,300 first-person accounts from former slaves in their digital archive.

== See also ==
- Auntie Caroline
- Black cat bone
- Gris-gris bag
- Hot foot powder
- Juju
- Medicine bag
- Nkisi Nkondi
- Sacred bundle
- Gehōbako
