= After Midnight (Janie Frickie album) =

Studio album by Janie Frickie
- Released: April 1987
- Recorded: December 1986
- Studio: Music City Music Hall, Nashville, Tennessee
- Genre: Country-pop; blues
- Label: Columbia
- Producer: Norro Wilson; Chip Young

Janie Frickie chronology
Black & White (1986)	After Midnight (1987)	Celebration (1987)

Singles from After Midnight
- 1. "Are You Satisfied?" Released: February 1987; 2. "From Time to Time (It Feels Like Love Again)" Released: April 1987; 3. "Baby You're Gone" Released: August 1987

After Midnight is a studio album by American country artist Janie Frickie. It was released in April 1986 via Columbia Records and contained ten tracks. It was the twelfth studio album issued in Frickie's music career and her second project produced by Norro Wilson. The album peaked in the top 40 of America's Billboard country LP's chart following its original release. Three singles were spawned from the album. Its highest-charting single was a duet with Larry Gatlin called "From Time to Time".

== Background and content ==
Janie Frickie was considered among country music's most successful artists during the mid 1980s. She had a string of number one and top ten country singles in North America that ranged in musical style. Beginning with 1986's Black & White, Frickie teamed up with producer Norro Wilson and together they fused country with blues music. The pair would record in a similar fashion fior 1987's After Midnight. The album was recorded in December 1986 at Music City Hall, a studio located in Nashville, Tennessee. Wilson served as a producer on most of the project, with the exception of "From Time to Time", which was produced by Chip Young. After Midnight consisted of ten tracks.

A majority of the recordings were new material including "Baby You're Gone", "My Eternal Flame" and "I Hurt". Another new track was a duet with Larry Gatlin (and his brothers) called "From Time to Time (It Feels Like Love Again)". The song first appeared on Gatlin's 1986 album titled Partners. Two covers of songs previously recorded by other artists are also featured on the project. The lead album track "Are You Satisfied" was a cover of the pop single by Rusty Draper. The disc's second cover was of the song "If I Didn't Care". The song was originally recorded by The Ink Spots and became a popular hit for the group in 1939.

== Release and chart performance ==
After Midnight was originally released in April 1987 on Columbia Records. The disc marked Frickie's twelfth studio recording of her career. It was originally distributed as a vinyl LP, cassette and a compact disc. In later decades, it was re-released to digital platforms including Apple Music. Due to constant mispronunciations of her last name, Columbia changed the spelling from "Fricke" to "Frickie" beginning in 1986. After Midnight also included the same spelling. The album spent 19 weeks on the Billboard Top Country Albums, climbing to the number 29 spot in mid 1987. To date, it is Frickie's last album to reach a top 40 position on a Billboard chart. Frickie's vocal performance on her 1986 and 1987 albums were highlighted by writer Kurt Wolff in his book Country Music: The Rough Guide. Wilson described her voice as "gutsy" and "bluesy" in these two album releases.

A total of three singles were spawned from After Midnight. Its first single released was Frickie's cover of "Are You Satisfied", which was issued in February 1987. The single made the top 40 on the Billboard Hot Country Songs chart, reaching number 32. In April 1987, "From Time to Time" was released as the album's next single. The song spent 12 weeks on the Billboard country chart and peaked at the number 21 position. It was Frickie's final top 40 single on the chart. In August 1987, "Baby You're Gone" was spawned as the album's final single. The single spent four weeks on the Billboard country list and reached number 63 in late 1987. All three singles also charted on Canada's RPM Country survey. "Are You Satisfied" was the highest-peaking release in Canada, climbing to the number 25 position.

== Track listing ==
=== Vinyl and cassette versions ===
Side one
No.	Title	Writer(s)	Length
1.	"Are You Satisfied"	Homer Escamilla; Sheb Wooley	NA
2.	"I Hurt"	Hank Cochran; Dean Dillon	NA
3.	"I Don't Like Being Lonely"	John English; Bob Moulds; David Wills	NA
4.	"Teach Me How to Forget"	Hugh Ashley	NA
5.	"If I Didn't Care"	Jack Lawrence	NA

Side two
No.	Title	Writer(s)	Length
1.	"Baby You're Gone"	Steve Davis; Dennis Morgan	NA
2.	"My Eternal Flame"	John Schweers	NA
3.	"Nobody Ever Loved Me So Good"	John Jarrard; Lisa Palas; Mark D. Sanders	NA
4.	"From Time to Time (It Feels Like Love Again)" (featuring Larry, Rudy and Steve Gatlin)	Larry Gatlin	NA
5.	"It Won't Be Easy"	Nat Simon; Charles Tobias	NA

=== Compact disc and digital versions ===
After Midnight
No.	Title	Writer(s)	Length
1.	"Are You Satisfied"	Escamilla; Wooley	2:51
2.	"I Hurt"	Cochran; Dillon	2:37
3.	"I Don't Like Being Lonely"	English; Moulds; Wills	3:10
4.	"Teach Me How to Forget"	Ashley	3:00
5.	"If I Didn't Care"	Lawrence	3:10
6.	"Baby You're Gone"	Davis; Morgan	2:50
7.	"My Eternal Flame"	Schweers	3:49
8.	"Nobody Ever Loved Me So Good"	Jarrard; Palas; Sanders	3:08
9.	"From Time to Time (It Feels Like Love Again)" (with The Gatlin Brothers)	Gatlin	3:24
10.	"It Won't Be Easy"	Simon; Tobias	3:40

== Weekly charts ==
Chart (1987)	Peak position
US Top Country Albums (Billboard)	29

== Release history ==
Region	Date	Format	Label	Ref.
North America	April 1987	Vinyl	Columbia Records	
North America	April 1987	Cassette	Columbia Records	
North America	April 1987	Compact disc	Columbia Records	
United Kingdom	April 1987	Vinyl	CBS Records International	
North America	2016	Music download; streaming	Columbia Records	
