= Gris-gris (talisman) =

West African voodoo talisman

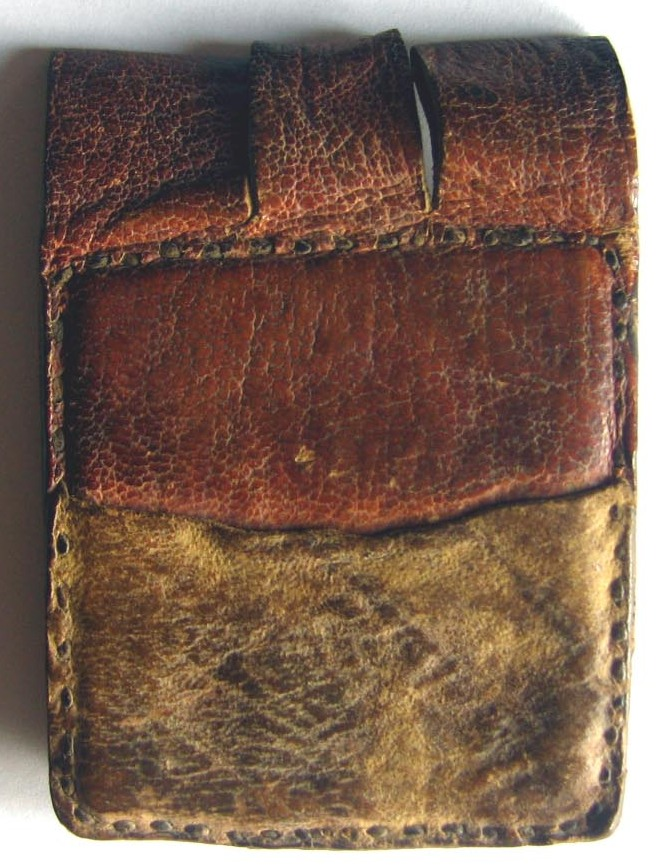
A West African Tuareg gris-gris

A gris-gris (/ˈɡriːˌɡriː/, also spelled grigri, and sometimes also "gregory" or "gerregery") is a talisman that originated in the Muslim Mande communities of Far West Africa and is believed to protect the wearer from evil or bring luck. Due to Atlantic slavery, the use of the gris-gris was translocated to the Americas and became a significant practice in Louisiana Voodoo and Haitian Vodou. It is also used as a purported method of birth control in some countries. Similar to the Kongo-influenced mojo bag, the gris-gris consists of a small cloth pouch, usually inscribed with verses from an ancestor and a ritual number of small objects, worn on the person.

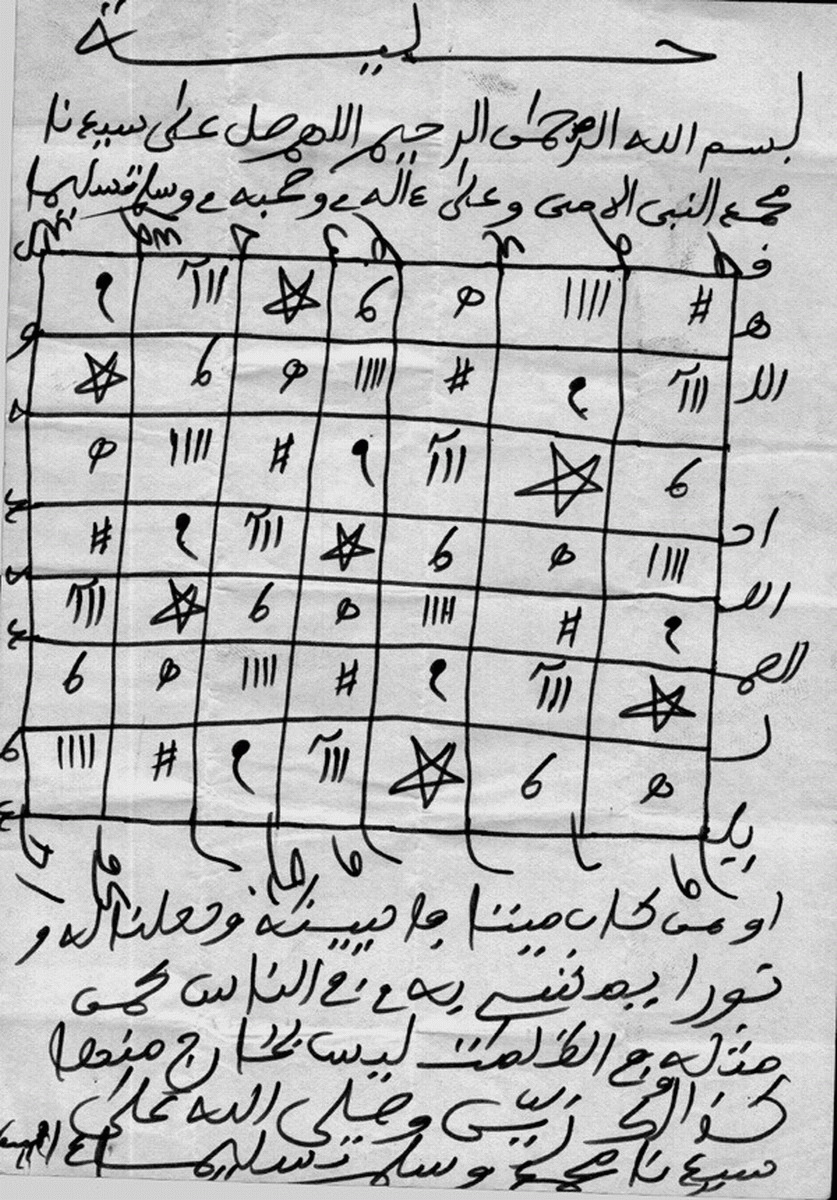
A petition paper with a verse from the Quran is placed inside a gris-gris (mojo bag) made by enslaved West African Muslims in the Americas.

== Etymology ==
The word gris-gris has origins amongst various Mande languages spoken by the Mandinka and Bambara peoples in West Africa and is believed to mean "magic".

== History ==
Due to reports by travelers who journeyed through the Volta Basin in present-day Ghana, it is believed that Mande speakers, such as the Dyula people, played a pivotal role in the creation and distribution of Islamic charms, which they called gris-gris. From them, the practice is believed to have spread to other Muslim ethnic groups, such as the Dagomba people, who wrote extensive Arabic manuscripts "with magic formulae and prescriptions for preparing amulets." Gris-gris were usually fashioned in the form of small sacks that consisted of Quran scriptures written on pieces on paper and herbs. The user would wear the sack around their neck. Some times, the written charms themselves were considered to have the power of a gris-gris and were carried by priests. Even non-Muslims in the region began to wear gris-gris sacks, which were called saffis.

=== The practice of Karamokobara ===
Amongst Mande Muslims, it is believed that Islamic scholars can access great mystical powers that can be "employed to prevent misfortune, cure illness, heal wounds, and forecast the future." With the help of talismans in the form of spoken prayers, magical numerical squares called katemi, and amulets or charms in the form of written inscriptions from the Quran, learned men are able to wield this power and are considered holy. This practice, known as Karamokobara, has two divisions: seli, or prayer, and siri, or path. Those who choose seli become scholars of Quranic law and are referred to as karamokos. Those who choose siri become scholars of mystical talisman called gris-gris and are referred to as marabouts (also called maraboos). While each group studies their own division extensively, there are also scholars who choose to become just as competent in the opposite division with some karamokos being able to produce powerful gris-gris and some marabouts interpreting the most complicated text.

=== The African diaspora ===
The Plaque at the grave of Louisiana Voodoo Queen, Marie Laveau. Marie Laveau's house may have been a stop on the Underground Railroad where she made gris-gris for freedom seekers escaping slavery.

The practice of using gris-gris, though originating in West Africa, was translocated to the Americas with enslaved Muslims, preserved and continued by practitioners of Louisiana Voodoo and Haitian Vodou.

However, the belief evolved in the United States, and the gri-gri was thought to bring black magic upon its "victim." Enslaved Africans would often use gris-gris against their owners. Some gris-gris were also found in burials, suggesting their use was a common practice. During the period, there were also reports of slaves cutting, drowning or otherwise manipulating the gris-gris of others in order to cause harm. In the Cajun communities of Louisiana, gris-gris are thought to be a symbol of black magic and ill-fortune.

In spite of the negative connotations of gris-gris, so-called Gris-Gris doctors have operated in the Louisiana Creole community for some centuries and are looked upon favorably by the Black community at large. In New Orleans, Louisiana court cases in 1773 saw slaves convicted for using gris-gris to kill their enslavers, making these some of the earliest legal mentions of Louisiana Voodoo. Enslaved conjure women created gris-gris to initiate slave rebellions, and it was believed that the spirits of the bags guided them to freedom on the Underground Railroad and shielded them from harm on their journey.

In the 1800s, the word gris-gris was used interchangeably in Louisiana to mean both bewitch and in reference to the traditional amulet. In October 1849, authorities arrested an enslaved man for carrying a human finger wrapped in flannel, which he believed brought good luck. People in New Orleans often sought human remains from tombs for conjure and gris-gris, which led to disturbances of gravesites.

In contrast, the Haiti gris-gris adhered to the original West African intent and was thought to be an amulet with good intentions in Haitian Vodou. The gris-gris is also used in Hoodoo, an African American spiritual tradition. In this context, a gris-gris is meant to represent the self.

=== Contemporary use ===
According to a 1982 survey, gris-gris were one of the top three methods of contraception known to women in Senegal. All three were traditional methods ("abstinence, roots and herbs, and charms ['gris-gris']"). Over 60% of women reported having knowledge of such traditional methods; modern means of contraception were not well known, with the pill the best-known of those, a little over 40% of women reporting knowledge of it. Gris-gris are worn by a wide strata of society by everyone "from wrestlers to soldiers to housewives, and can feature anything from monkey to snake to mouse."

== See also ==
- Juju
- Mojo bag
- Medicine bag
- Omamori
- Sacred bundle
- Ta'wiz
