= Always Have, Always Will =

Always Have, Always Will may refer to:

- "Always Have, Always Will" (Ace of Base song)
- "Always Have, Always Will" (Janie Fricke song)
