= The Mysterious Caravan =

1975 book by Franklin W. Dixon

- Author: Franklin W. Dixon
- Language: English
- Series: The Hardy Boys
- Genre: Detective, mystery
- Publisher: Grosset & Dunlap
- Publication date: 1975
- Publication place: United States
- Media type: Print (hardback & paperback)
- Pages: 182 pp
- ISBN: 0-448-08954-8
- OCLC: 1527252
- LC Class: PZ7.D644 Mu
- Preceded by: The Clue of the Hissing Serpent
- Followed by: The Witchmaster's Key

The Mysterious Caravan is the fifty-fourth volume in the original The Hardy Boys series of mystery books for children and teens published by Grosset & Dunlap.

This book was written for the Stratemeyer Syndicate by Andrew E. Svenson in 1975.

== Plot summary ==
On a winter vacation in Jamaica, the Hardy Boys begin a dangerous adventure when an ancient gold death mask is discovered near their beach house (where Frank comically loses and finds his underwear). The case takes them from Jamaica to their hometown of Bayport to Casablanca to Marrakesh. They meet William along the way, a kind African who is willing to help them uncover secrets of the mask, which they find out is Jamaican property.

William scares off the enemies of the Hardy Boys in Swahili, telling them he is an even more powerful juju man than theirs and eventually Mr. Hardy comes, after Frank and Joe thought he was dead. Back at the Celliers', they celebrate and Christine, the gorgeous, black-haired teen who also assisted them in solving the case lets the Hardys call home to their worrying mother and eats dinner with Aunt Gertrude. William even receives a statue of a Basenji dog as a present for saving the Hardys from the predicament.
