= Sacred bundle =

Indigenous American sacred items

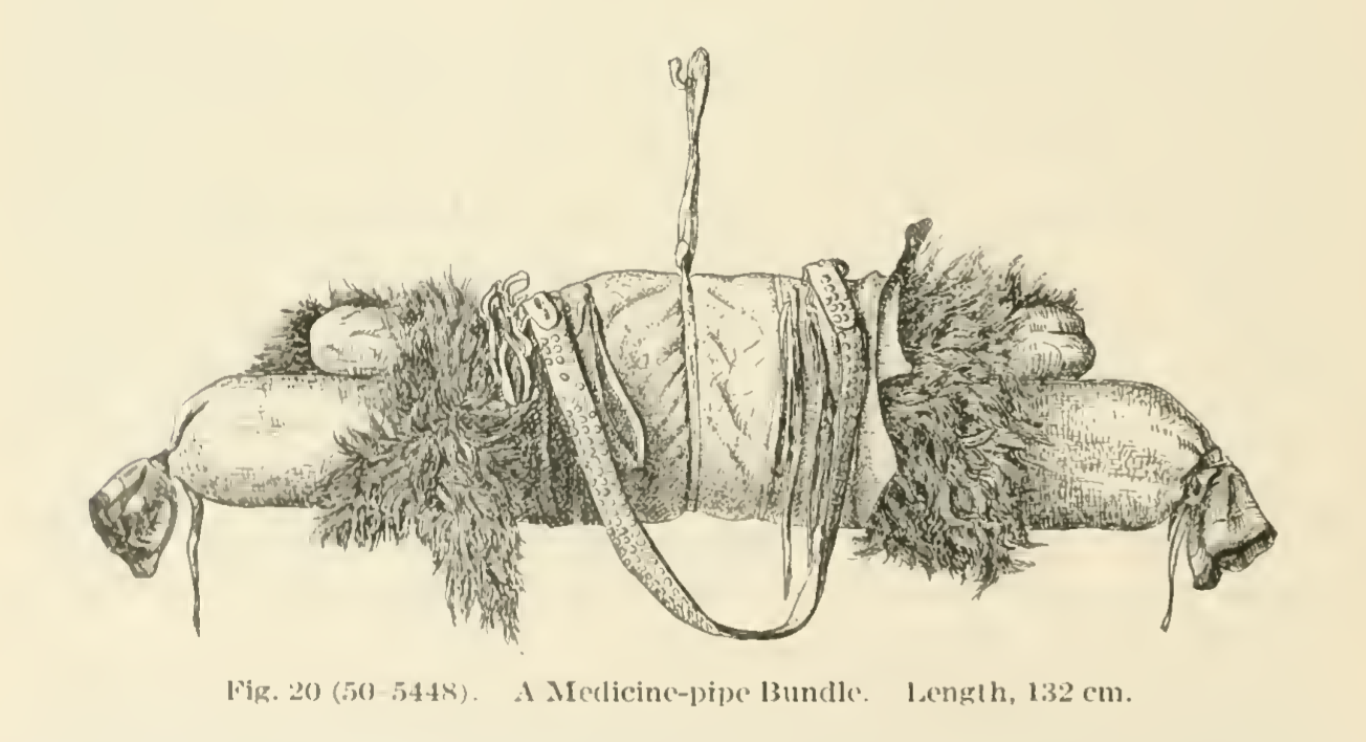
Blackfoot Indian medicine bundle

A sacred bundle or a medicine bundle is a wrapped collection of sacred items, held by a designated carrier, used in Indigenous American ceremonial cultures.

According to Patricia Deveraux, a member of the Blackfoot Confederacy in Alberta, "These are holy bundles given to us by the Creator to hold our people together... They're the same as the relics from the Catholic Church. They are a demonstration of the holy spirit. They can heal people."

== Overview ==
According to Black Elk of the Oglala Lakota, the first woman chosen to care for the sacred bundle was Red Day Woman, and all women subsequently chosen to care for the sacred bundle are regarded as holy people.

To open or use a bundle without the proper ritual and ceremony portends disaster.

=== Mesoamerica ===
In Mesoamerica, the 'bundle' as an idea, image and word, is seen as both the container, such as the wrapping of the bundle, and the contents, which could be any number of special objects possessing spiritual significance. Called tlaquimilolli among Nahuatl speaking peoples, the bundles were receptacles of divine force and served as symbols of group identity.

Historically, sacred bundles were also prominent among the Aztecs and the Quiché Mayas (see Popol Vuh). The pre-Columbian Borgia Codex uniquely visualizes the mystic powers emanating from such a bundle.

== See also ==
- Maya religion
- Apotropaic magic
- Medicine bag
- Mojo bag
- Gris-gris (talisman)
- Fetishism
- Sympathetic magic
