= When a Woman Cries =

Single by Janie Fricke

from the album Black & White
- B-side: "Nothing Left to Say"
- Released: November 8, 1986
- Genre: Country
- Length: 4:08
- Label: Columbia
- Songwriter(s): Buck Moore, Mentor Williams
- Producer(s): Norro Wilson

Janie Fricke singles chronology
"Always Have, Always Will" (1986)	"When a Woman Cries" (1986)	"Are You Satisfied?" (1987)

"When a Woman Cries" is a song written by Buck Moore and Mentor Williams, and recorded by American country music artist Janie Fricke. It was released in November 1986 as the second single from the album Black & White. The song reached #20 on the Billboard Hot Country Singles & Tracks chart.

== Chart performance ==
Chart (1986–1987)	Peak position
US Hot Country Songs (Billboard)	20
Canadian RPM Country Tracks	10
