= Black cat bone =

Lucky charm used in the magical tradition of African-American hoodoo

A black cat bone is a type of lucky charm used in the magical tradition of hoodoo. It is thought to ensure a variety of positive effects, such as invisibility, good luck, protection from malevolent magic, rebirth after death, and romantic success.

...I got a black cat bone,
I got a mojo too,
I got the John the Conqueror root,
I'm gonna mess with you...

— Muddy Waters, "Hoochie Coochie Man"

The bone, anointed with Van Van oil, may be carried as a component of a mojo bag; alternatively, without the coating of oil, it is held in the charm-user's mouth.

== Origins ==
The black cat has been a symbol of both good and ill luck in near-worldwide folklore accounts. Magical traditions involving black cat bones, specifically, have been found in German-Canadian practice as well as in hoodoo; these German-Canadian magic-makers were not previously in contact with hoodooists, suggesting a European origin to the charm.

The use of the black cat bone to ensure invisibility, specifically as an aid to people, is comparable to the European Hand of Glory.

== Differences in method ==
After a black cat is caught, it is almost universally boiled alive in a pot of water at midnight, so that its bones may be more easily looked over by the practitioner. One particular bone, special to each individual cat, contains all the magical efficacy alone. This part of the ritual comes from the European magical text, the Book of Saint Cyprian.

A variety of rituals and methods are used to determine which bone is the right one, and preparation before the cat's slaughter can vary according to tradition.

One method of obtaining a black cat bone, described in Zora Neale Hurston's Mules and Men, involves a period of fasting before the actual catching of the animal. After the standard boiling of the cat's corpse, each bone is tasted by the hoodooist, who then selects the first bitter-tasting bone as the correct one.

Another way to determine the magical bone, though it is otherwise similar in procedure, involves a mirror. When the reflection of the bone becomes dark, the hoodoo practitioner will know that it is the right one. A variation of this method is also practiced on the Sea Islands, where the one bone that does not reflect in the mirror is believed to be magical.

Yet another method of determining which bone is the correct one is to dump all the bones into a river. The bone that floats upstream is to be considered the bone of choice.

== Sale of purported "black cat bones" ==
Contemporary hoodoo supply shops sell items labeled "black cat bones", usually small bones taken from a chicken and dyed black. Contemporary hoodoo, Wiccan, and other metaphysical supply shops use black cat fur for black cat magic, instead of bones.
