= Black & White (Janie Frickie album) =

Studio album by Janie Frickie
- Released: July 1986
- Recorded: March 1986
- Studio: Merit Recording Studio
- Genre: Country-pop; blues
- Label: Columbia
- Producer: Norro Wilson

Janie Frickie chronology
The Very Best of Janie (1985)	Black & White (1986)	After Midnight (1987)

Singles from Black & White
- 1. "Always Have, Always Will" Released: June 1986; 2. "When a Woman Cries" Released: November 8, 1986

Black & White is a studio album by American country music artist Janie Frickie. It was released via Columbia Records in July 1986. The project marked the eleventh studio album released in Frickie's music career. The album contained ten tracks of material that mixed country with blues styles. It was the first and only album in Fricke's career to top the America's Billboard country LP's chart. Its two single releases would reach Billboard chart positions, beginning with "Always Have, Always Will."

== Background and content ==
Janie Frickie had become among the most commercially successful country artists of the 1980s, having a series of number one and top ten songs. Her popular recordings varies in musical styles that ranged from ballads to up-tempo country pop material. These styles changed with each producer Frickie worked with during the decade. After working on several albums with Bob Montgomery, Fricke collaborated with producer Norro Wilson for 1986's Black & White. The album was produced in March 1986 at the Merit Recording Studio, located in Nashville, Tennessee. Wilson served as the project's only producer.

Black & White was a collection of ten tracks. The album consisted of both new recordings and covers of previously recorded material. Among its new tracks was Frickie's self-penned "I'd Take You Back Again", Kent Robbins's "Treat Me Like a Vacation" and Johnny Mears's "Always Have, Always Will". Also included was a cover of the country song "Till I Can't Take It Anymore". Billy Joe Royal would later take his version of the song to the top five on the Billboard country chart in 1989.

== Release, reception and singles ==
Black & White was originally released in July 1986 on Columbia Records. It was Frickie's eleventh studio album released in her career. The album was distributed as a vinyl LP, cassette and compact disc. In later years, the disc was re-released to digital platforms including Apple Music. Due to constant mispronunciations of her last name, Columbia changed the spelling from "Fricke" to "Frickie" for Black & White. The album was the first in Fricke's career to reach the number one spot on the Billboard Top Country Albums chart. The disc received positive review from critics. Jack Hurst of the Chicago Tribune described it as "excellent" in 1986. Writer Kurt Wolff praised Fricke's voice, calling it "gutsy" and "bluesy".

Two singles were spawned from Black & White. The first was "Always Have, Always Will", which was issued by Columbia Records in June 1986. The song reached the number one spot on Billboard's Hot Country Songs chart in October 1986. It was Fricke's final number one single in her career. In October 1986, "When a Woman Cries" was issued as the second and final single. In early 1987, the single peaked at number 20 on the Billboard country chart, becoming her last top 20 song in her career. Both singles reached similar chart positions on Canada's RPM Country survey. "Always Have, Always Will" topped the RPM chart while "When a Woman Cries" climbed to the number ten spot.

== Track listing ==
=== Vinyl and cassette versions ===
Side one
No.	Title	Writer(s)	Length
1.	"Till I Can't Take It Anymore"	Ulysses Burton; Clyde Otis	3:13
2.	"He's Breating Down My Neck"	Bob DiPiero; Gerry House	2:49
3.	"Take Me Like a Vacation"	Kent Robbins	2:36
4.	"Nothing Left to Say"	Randy Jackson; David Stephenson	3:30
5.	"Comin' Apart at the Seams"	Jerry Marcum; Les Taylor	2:45

Side two
No.	Title	Writer(s)	Length
1.	"Always Have, Always Will"	Johnny Mears	3:34
2.	"Don't Put It Past My Heart"	Eddie Burton; Thomas Grant	3:12
3.	"When a Woman Cries"	Buck Moore; Mentor Williams	4:01
4.	"He's Making a Long Story Short"	Doug Gilmore; Ed Hunnicutt; Bob Marler	3:11
5.	"I'd Take You Back Again"	Janie Frickie	3:09

=== Compact disc and digital versions ===
Black & White
No.	Title	Writer(s)	Length
1.	"Till I Can't Take It Anymore"	Burton; Otis	3:15
2.	"He's Breating Down My Neck"	DiPiero; House	2:51
3.	"Take Me Like a Vacation"	Robbins	2:53
4.	"Nothing Left to Say"	Jackson; Stephenson	3:31
5.	"Comin' Apart at the Seams"	Marcum; Taylor	2:37
6.	"Always Have, Always Will"	Mears	3:41
7.	"Don't Put It Past My Heart"	Burton; Grant	3:15
8.	"When a Woman Cries"	Moore; Williams	4:06
9.	"He's Making a Long Story Short"	Gilmore; Hunnicutt; Marler	3:14
10.	"I'd Take You Back Again"	Frickie	3:11

== Personnel ==
All credits are adapted from the liner notes of Black & White.

Musical personnel

- Michael Bowden – Musician
- Eddie Burton – Musician
- Thomas Brumley – Musician
- Steve Cropper – Musician
- Walter Cunningham – Musician
- Janie Frickie – Lead vocals
- John Gardner – Musician
- Vickie Hampton – Background vocals
- James Horn – Musician
- Ronnie Hughes – Musician
- Bill Hullett – Musician
- Mike Lawler – Musician
- Sam Levine – Musician
- Randy McCormick – Musician
- John Neel – Musician
- Gary Nicholson – Musician
- Gary Prim – Musician
- Lisa Silver – Background vocals
- Robb Strandlund – Musician
- Diane Tidwell – Background vocals
- John Ware – Musician
- Bill Warren – Background vocals
- Tony Wiggins – Background vocals
- Benny Wilson – Background vocals

Technical personnel

- Denny – Lacquer cut
- Tom Pick – Engineer
- Danny Purcell – Mastering
- Randee St. Nicholas – Photography
- Norro Wilson – Producer

== Charts ==
=== Weekly charts ===
Chart (1986)	Peak position
US Top Country Albums (Billboard)	1

=== Year-end charts ===
Chart (1986)	Position
US Top Country Albums (Billboard)	48

== Release history ==
Region	Date	Format	Label	Ref.
North America	July 1986	Vinyl	Columbia Records	
North America	July 1986	Cassette	Columbia Records	
North America	July 1986	Compact disc	Columbia Records	
United Kingdom	July 1986	Vinyl	CBS Records International	
North America	2016	Music download; streaming	Columbia Records	
