= Aunt Caroline Dye =

African American Hoodoo woman, rootworker and conjuror

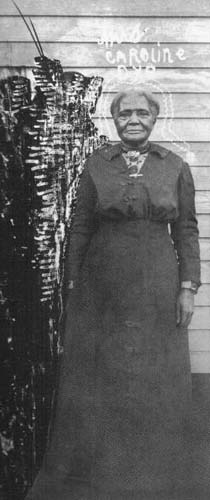
- Born: Caroline Tracy; 1810 or c. 1843; Spartanburg, South Carolina
- Died: September 26, 1918; Newport, Arkansas
- Other names: Aunt Caroline, Auntie
- Occupations: Hoodoo woman, rental property entrepreneur, soothsayer, rootworker, healer, landowner
- Spouse: Martin Dye
- Children: 1

Caroline Dye (1810 or c. 1843–1918) also known as Aunt Caroline, was a renowned African American Hoodoo woman, rental property investor, soothsayer, rootworker and conjuror based in Newport, Arkansas.

== Early life ==
Aunt Caroline Dye was born Caroline Tracy in Spartanburg, South Carolina. Her gravestone cites her age at the time of her death as 108 years old, which would put her birth year at 1810. However, several US federal census forms in Jackson County from the year 1870 to 1910 estimate her birth year should be between 1843 and 1853. Note, it was not uncommon for incorrect birth years to appear on the census forms of formerly enslaved people. And like many other persons who were born into slavery, the names of Caroline's parents are unknown. However, she and her 12 siblings were owned by William (1789-1841) and Nancy Tracy, who operated a plantation in Spartanburg.

Caroline reportedly exhibited the ability to make accurate prophecies early on in her life. At just 10 years old, she was a house girl helping to set the table for the Tracy family table for Thanksgiving dinner when she insisted that there were not enough plates set at the table because "Mister Charley," William's brother, would be coming to dinner. This was dismissed by everyone, as Charley was believed to have been a casualty of the Civil War just four years earlier. However, when Charley actually showed up to dinner later that day with his tale of being taken prisoner, they all had to admit there was something quite miraculous about Caroline. This account creates further confusion about her birthdate because the war only lasted four years. If she was 10 years old in 1865, the last year the war ended, that would put her birth year in 1855.

After William Tracy's death, his wife Nancy relocated to Independence County, Arkansas with her children and the enslaved persons whom she inherited. Caroline was a teen at the time of the move. At some point in Arkansas, she gave birth to a daughter named Hannah. Despite Nancy's death in 1861, Caroline would remain the property of the Tracy estate until the Emancipation Proclamation freed her two years later.

Another account states that she was born on the property of a wealthy merchant named Henry C. Dye in Sulphur Rock, Arkansas and lived there until she was granted her freedom in 1863. In this narrative of her early life, her future husband, Martin Dye, was also enslaved on the plantation.

== Rise to prominence ==
After gaining her freedom in 1863, Caroline moved to Franklin County, Arkansas, where several townships were established for newly freed Black people. When she settled in Newport, Arkansas, she began to gain notoriety as a seer. While she did not charge for her services, patrons always left her a monetary offering. With the pension from her husband's death and the donations, she purchased land and constructed rental property, not far from the business district of Newport.

While Aunt Caroline rejected the title of fortune teller, many of her clients identified her as a prophet, who had the ability to see the future. She did not use tarot cards nor crystal balls, and she was not known to palm read. She used a regular deck of playing cards that she would spread out in front of her to help with her concentration. Other times, she simply looked at the person and could tell them what they needed to know. Believers in her abilities were Black, white and Indigenous. Her house was constantly full, especially on the weekends. As visitors exited the Rock Island trains in droves to make their way to her home, she was known to cook up soul food plates and sell them.

It was not long before news of her abilities spread throughout the Mid-South. People traveled from as far as 400 miles away to seek Aunt Caroline's wisdom, according to historian John Quincy Wolf. She helped people find long-lost relatives, lost pets, jewelry and other personal items. After one man paid her a visit to help find his lost hogs, she reportedly told him "Your hogs were stolen. Go down the road to the fifth house from you, go back to the barn and you'll find yo' hogs in a stable. Unlatch the door and leave it open and yo' hogs will come home. Don't go today because the people who live there are home. But tomorrow they'll be gone for the day. So you go tomorrow."

While prominent residents of Newport mocked her abilities in public, they sought her instruction before they made any important decisions, especially those pertaining to business. They begged her to keep their late-night visits to her home a secret. She would often confront those who were skeptical of her gifts and prove them wrong. It was reported by one of her servants that a man came to her with help finding his mules, but he did not really think she could find them. Aunt Caroline told him, "You don' think I can tell you where your mules is but I can. Go down the Tuckerman road four miles till you come to a big holler and they's a lot of timber in the holler. Go up the holler till you hear yo' mules brayin.' They'll be locked up in a barn, but on the near side of the barn, they's a foundation block and on the block you'll find the key."

== Hoodoo woman ==
Aunt Caroline also gained respect as a Hoodoo woman, rootworker, healer and conjuror. She was believed to have a connection to God, where she could use the Bible, mojo bags, natural ingredients to heal people of their ailments. Will Shade, leader of the Memphis Jug Band, was interviewed by Paul Oliver and said, "White and colored would go to her. You sick in bed, she raise the sick. … Had that much brains — smart lady. … That’s the kind of woman she was. Aunt Caroline Dye, she was the worst woman in the world. Had that much sense."

There are numerous accounts of her healing people. Author and folklorist Harry Middleton Hyatt conducted interviews between 1935 and 1939 about prominent figures in Hoodoo and rootwork, including Aunt Caroline. In one interview with a woman identified as Madam Collins of Memphis, she said that Aunt Caroline healed her cousin, Lou T. in Oil Trough, Arkansas. The woman had been poisoned and could not find a cure. According to Madam Collins, Aunt Caroline used rattlesnake dust, turpentine and gave specific ritualistic instructions for how Lou could receive her healing. Her final instructions were for Lou to face the east and say, "Lawd, heah am Ah. Take all mah troubles an' heal me, In de name of de Father, Son, and Holy Ghost."

Like most Hoodoo spiritualists, Aunt Caroline believed in God, Jesus and the Holy Ghost. Thus, her rootwork often incorporated Black Baptist teachings. In Hoodoo tradition, the god Yahweh is seen as the head conjuror and His prominent followers from the Bible, like Moses, are believed to be Hoodoo practitioners. In Moses, Man of the Mountain, anthropologist and Hoodoo researcher Zora Neale Hurston refers to Moses as "the finest Hoodoo man in the world." The Christian Bible is also revered as a talisman, a book of spells used to obtain the blessings and healings of God. For members of the Hoodoo community, the Bible is greatest book of conjure.

Aunt Caroline was strictly rooted in Hoodoo tradition, which has Central African influences. While many often confused this spirituality with actual religions, she did not practice West African Voodoo nor Louisiana Voodoo. She also did not believe in cursing people and refused to give predictions about love interest or wars.

== Personal life ==
U.S. Freedmen's Bureau Marriage Records show that Caroline Tracy, aged 20, married Martin Dye, aged 22 on June 11, 1867, in Jacksonport, Arkansas. Her birth year is listed as 1847. A 1870 federal census form records Caroline and Martin Dye, living in Bird Township in Newport, Jackson County, Arkansas with Martin's two daughters from a previous marriage, Martha (born in 1856, Kentucky) and Lucy (born in 1864, Missouri). Caroline's birthplace is listed as South Carolina, while Martin was reportedly born in Tennessee. A 1910 United States Federal Census for Union Township in Newport, Jackson County, Arkansas, listed Caroline as a widow. She also filed a U.S. Civil War pension claim on December 16, 1907, so this was likely the year that Martin died.

== Death ==
Aunt Caroline Dye died on September 26, 1918, in Newport, Arkansas. Her gravestone says that she was 108 years old when she died. Her farmland and rental properties amassed her a substantial amount of wealth, especially for a Black woman with no formal education in the South. A probated will filed on August 15, 1918, suggests that Caroline suspected her death would soon come. The will stated she had "no heirs of my body..." The majority of her land and money was to be divided between Irene Atkin, a child that she adopted and Mac Griffin, a nephew. She placed her longtime friend, C. M. Erwin, in charge of her rental properties and Irene's trust, believing her nephew would squander it all. Caroline's daughter, Hannah, is not listed on any census forms nor in her will. Large stacks of cash were found in Aunt Caroline's home, and there were whispers that she also had gold hidden in secret places around Newport. People flocked to the city and searched for decades, but nothing was ever recovered.

== Legacy ==
Aunt Caroline Dye is still known today through African American oral tradition and blues music. Several blues artists featured her in their songs. Will Shade and the Memphis Jug Band performed a song titled "Aunt Caroline Dyer Blues." The lyrics of the song speak of a man going to Newport, Arkansas to see Aunt Caroline. She's described as a fortune-telling woman, who can whip him up a mojo bag, so that he can strut his stuff around town and not live so rough. She's also called a two-headed woman, who can raise the sick, break spells and possesses power far greater than Seven Sisters, a notable family of conjurors in New Orleans in the 1920s. Johnny Temple also wrote his 1937 hit "Hoodoo Woman" about Aunt Caroline. The lyrics call her by name and speak of him standing on a mountain in Jerusalem, Arkansas and then going to Newport, Arkansas to seek a mojo from Aunt Caroline.
