= The Shattered Helmet =

Book by Franklin W. Dixon

- Author: Franklin W. Dixon
- Language: English
- Series: The Hardy Boys
- Genre: Detective, mystery
- Publisher: Grosset & Dunlap
- Publication date: 1973
- Publication place: United States
- Media type: Print (hardback & paperback)
- Pages: 180 pp
- ISBN: 0-448-08952-1
- OCLC: 707070
- LC Class: PZ7.D644 Sg
- Preceded by: The Masked Monkey
- Followed by: The Clue of the Hissing Serpent

The Shattered Helmet is the fifty-second volume in the original The Hardy Boys series of mystery books for children and teens published by Grosset & Dunlap.

This book was written for the Stratemeyer Syndicate by Andrew E. Svenson in 1973.

== Plot summary ==
Danger is the name of the game when the Hardys agree to help their pen pal from Greece, Evangelos Pandropolos, search for a priceless, ancient Greek helmet. Years ago, Evan's uncle had loaned it to a Hollywood movie company for use in a silent motion picture, The Persian Glory, for a role in the movie, but the treasured helmet was lost after the movie was done.

At Hunt College, where Evan, Frank, Joe and Chet Morton are taking a summer course in film-making, the boys are harassed by Leon Saffel whose harassments get more and more vicious. All the while a gang is trying to force Mr. Hardy to give up his investigations of a national crime syndicate and also trying to find the helmet, which after speaking to Evan's billionaire uncle, they learn may have belonged to King Agamemnon, making the helmet even more valuable.

The clues that the Hardys unearth keep them constantly on the move-from their college campus to California, and finally, to Greece. In a sizzling climax, the Hardys, Evan and Chet, match wits with their powerful enemies on the island of Corfu.

== Online Availability ==
The Shattered Helmet free online at the Creative Library
