= The Jungle Pyramid =

1977 book by Franklin W. Dixon

- Author: Franklin W. Dixon
- Language: English
- Series: Hardy Boys
- Genre: Detective, mystery
- Publisher: Grosset & Dunlap
- Publication date: 1977
- Publication place: United States
- Media type: Print (hardback & paperback)
- Pages: 180 pp
- ISBN: 0-448-08956-4
- OCLC: 2746108
- LC Class: PZ7.D644 Ju
- Preceded by: The Witchmaster's Key
- Followed by: The Firebird Rocket

The Jungle Pyramid is the fifty-sixth volume in the original Hardy Boys series of mystery books for children and teens published by Grosset & Dunlap. Written by Vincent Buranelli for the Stratemeyer Syndicate in 1977, it was published under the pseudonym Franklin W. Dixon.

== Plot summary ==
Somebody steals gold from the Wakefield Mint without even triggering the alarm. The Hardy Boys must track the gold down. Then the Early Art Museum is robbed of a gold artifact. Their main suspect is a man named Pedro Zemog, who ran out of the museum after the alarm was triggered. A strange note with Zemog's name on it sends them to Zurich, where somebody claims to know about the Wakefield gold theft. Then another note with Zemog's name on it sends the boys to Mexico City, where they discover a pyramid in the jungle. In the pyramid are many gold coins and sculptures. Afterward, the boys discover the gang's hideout and thwart the gang with their father Fenton's help.
