= The Masked Monkey =

1972 book by Franklin W. Dixon

- Author: Franklin W. Dixon
- Language: English
- Series: The Hardy Boys
- Genre: Detective, mystery
- Publisher: Grosset & Dunlap
- Publication date: 1972
- Publication place: United States
- Media type: Print (hardback & paperback)
- Pages: 178 pp
- Preceded by: Danger on Vampire Trail
- Followed by: The Shattered Helmet

The Masked Monkey is the fifty-first volume in the original The Hardy Boys series of mystery books for children and teens published by Grosset & Dunlap.

This book was written for the Stratemeyer Syndicate by Vincent Buranelli in 1972.

== Plot summary ==
The Hardy brothers' search for the missing son of a wealthy industrialist leads them to Brazil and great danger. Chet's hobby at the time is retrieving golf balls from the bottom of ponds at the golf courses around the Bayport area. This yields important clues that help the Hardys round up a gang of criminals who help other criminals change their identity.

Characters include Joe Hardy, Frank Hardy, Fenton Hardy, Laura Hardy, Aunt Gertrude, Chester Morton, J.G Retson, Phil, Tony, Joachim San Marten, Gus McCormick, Mr Jackson, Mrs Martha Jackson, Harris, Harry Grimsel, Sam Radley, Belkin, and Moreno.

The story takes place in Granite City, Bayport, New York, Belém, and Manaus.
