= Hot foot powder =

Powder used to drive unwanted people away in African-American hoodoo folk magic

Hot foot powder is used in African American hoodoo folk magic to drive unwanted people away.

== Description ==
It is a mixture of herbs and minerals, virtually always including chilli powder, salt, pepper, and chilli flakes. Other ingredients, such as wasp's nests, sulfur, and graveyard dirt are sometimes added. It also shows some overlapping uses with goofer dust, which also is known to create restlessness and drive people away.

== Origins ==
According to some scholars who have done research in African-American communities, hot foot powder may not be a traditional practice but a commercialized version of the traditional "walkin foot". Walkin foot is a powder made in traditional African-American hoodoo to confuse a person, causing them to walk in all directions in a confused state. The practice was influenced from foot track magic in West Africa, where West African people take a person's foot tracks and combine with ingredients to control a person's movements. It was brought to the United States during the transatlantic slave trade.

== American hoodoo ==
The practice became African-American when Black people in America used American materials such as North American herbs, roots and animal parts, to create a powder combining with a person's foot track and sprinkle it on their shoes or in their foot tracks (foot prints) to "hoodoo the person." Harry M. Hyatt collected several recipes and spells for hot foot powder. Some modes of deploying hot foot collected by him include secreting a small amount into the victim's shoes or clothing, mixing it with a victim's foot track, or placing a paper with the victim's name into a bottle with hot foot powder and disposing of it in a river.

== In culture ==
In the 1930s song "Hellhound on My Trail", the blues musician Robert Johnson said, "You sprinkled hot foot powder [...] all around your daddy's door / it keep me with ramblin' mind, rider, every old place I go." In 2000, the British rock guitarist Peter Green released a CD calledHot Foot Powder, containing 13 covers of songs written by Robert Johnson.
