= The Bombay Boomerang =

1970 book by Franklin W. Dixon

- Author: Franklin W. Dixon
- Language: English
- Series: Hardy Boys
- Genre: Detective, mystery
- Publisher: Grosset & Dunlap
- Publication date: 1970
- Publication place: United States
- Media type: Print (hardback & paperback)
- Pages: 180 pp
- ISBN: 0-448-08949-1
- OCLC: 233549589
- Preceded by: The Arctic Patrol Mystery
- Followed by: Danger on Vampire Trail

The Bombay Boomerang is the forty-ninth volume in the original The Hardy Boys series of mystery books for children and teens published by Grosset & Dunlap.

This book was written for the Stratemeyer Syndicate by Vincent Buranelli in 1970.

== Plot summary ==
The Hardy Boys head to sea to solve the theft of mercury shipments and a government missile and to foil a terrorist plan to create havoc in the United States. They discover that the gang is hiding in a hotel in Baltimore, where their father, Fenton Hardy, is staying under the name L. Marks. An attempt is made on their father's life when his cover is blown, but the Hardy Boys save him in time. Using devices such as ear bugs, they spy on the gang. With the help of an Admiral at the Pentagon, the boys uncover the gang's nefarious plot. The gang wants to blast a cave containing nerve gas with a Super S missile that can't be redirected. This will cause the nerve gas to spread in the US, which in turn will help overthrow the US government. The Hardys learn that an Indian freighter, Nanda Kailash, is going to dock at Baltimore. They explore the ship as all the clues point towards India. There, an attempt is made on Joe's life. The Hardys also capture the Mercury gang. They find a new friend, Akshay, who takes them to a ship called the Bombay Batarang, where they uncover some clues to the mystery. In the end, with trickery the Hardys capture the rest of the gang. Later they are abducted, but they fight off the criminals and capture the mastermind in the end by way of Chet throwing a boomerang and disabling a jet which the gang is in.
