= Danger on Vampire Trail =

1971 book by Franklin W. Dixon

- Author: Franklin W. Dixon
- Language: English
- Series: The Hardy Boys
- Genre: Detective, mystery
- Publisher: Grosset & Dunlap
- Publication date: 1971
- Publication place: United States
- Media type: Print (hardback & paperback)
- Pages: 175 pp
- ISBN: 0-448-08950-5
- OCLC: 128481
- LC Class: PZ7.D644 Dal
- Preceded by: The Bombay Boomerang
- Followed by: The Masked Monkey

Danger on Vampire Trail is the fifty volume in the original The Hardy Boys series of mystery books for children and teens published by Grosset & Dunlap.

This book was written for the Stratemeyer Syndicate by Andrew E. Svenson and first published in 1971.

== Plot summary ==
The Hardy boys and two friends Chet and Biff take a camping trip to the Rocky Mountains in an attempt to locate a gang of credit card counterfeiters.
