= Sol Rabinowitz =

Saul "Sol" Rabinowitz (April 26, 1924 – March 16, 2013) was an American music business executive. He was the founder and lead producer of Baton Records, an independent record label that recorded rhythm and blues music in New York City during the 1950s.

== Biography ==
He was born in The Bronx, New York City, the son of a Latvian-born rabbi and a Ukrainian mother, and trained as a printer before joining the Army Air Corps during World War II. He developed an interest in jazz and blues music, and began visiting clubs in New York. After the end of the war, he started work as a record salesman, before setting up Baton Records in 1954. His first record, "A Thousand Stars" by the Rivileers, was a regional hit.

Over the next few years, the label was responsible for several moderate sized R&B hits, for The Hearts, Ann Cole - including the original version of "Got My Mojo Working" - and Noble "Thin Man" Watts.

He closed the business in 1959, setting up Sir Records, which was unsuccessful. In 1961 he joined Columbia Records, and was responsible for the relaunch of the OKeh label, and for the development of the Epic label. He was appointed a vice-president at CBS International in 1966, and set up a new division of the company in Greece before retiring in 1986.

After his retirement he lived in Cary, North Carolina. He died in 2013 at the age of 88.
