= The Witchmaster's Key =

1976 book by Franklin W. Dixon

- Author: Franklin W. Dixon
- Language: English
- Series: The Hardy Boys
- Genre: Detective, mystery
- Publisher: Grosset & Dunlap
- Publication date: 1976
- Publication place: United States
- Media type: Print (hardback & paperback)
- Pages: 179 pp
- ISBN: 0-448-08955-6
- OCLC: 3872831
- LC Class: PZ7.D644 Wi
- Preceded by: The Mysterious Caravan
- Followed by: The Jungle Pyramid

The Witchmaster's Key is the fifty-fifth volume in the Hardy Boys series of detective/mystery books published by Grosset & Dunlap.

This book was written for the Stratemeyer Syndicate by Vincent Buranelli in 1976.

== Plot summary ==
In East Anglia, England, Frank and Joe Hardy are investigating one of the unusual cases of their lives, involving burglary, witchcraft, and maybe even kidnapping. Soon they are caught in a battle for their lives against the forces of evil.

== See also ==
- List of Hardy Boys books
