= Jim Jordan (conjure doctor) =

American conjure doctor (1871–1962)

- Born: James Spurgeon Jordan; June 3, 1871; Hertford County, North Carolina, U.S.
- Died: January 28, 1962 (aged 90); Hertford County, North Carolina, U.S.
- Occupations: Conjure doctor; businessman
- Spouse: Adell Cooper (m. 1900; died 1955)
- Children: 42

James Spurgeon Jordan (/ˈdʒɜːrdən/ JUR-dən; June 3, 1871 – January 28, 1962) was an American conjure doctor and businessman. Born to former slaves in eastern North Carolina, he learned folk healing practices from his family. His faith healing practice, using methods such as herbal medicine and crystal ball reading, became well known along the East Coast. This and his other business endeavors developed a community around him known as "Jordanville".

== Early life ==
Jordan was born in 1871 in Hertford County, North Carolina, the first son and fourth of eleven children of parents who were born into slavery. His father, Isaac, was a sharecropper and lay preacher after emancipation. His mother, Harriet (née Hill), who was thought to be of Black Indian descent, was a homemaker and weaver and introduced her son to folk medical traditions. In his formative years, his family sharecropped on the farm of inventor Henry Gatling, who acted kindly toward the young Jordan. He attended a one-room school and was immersed in stories of ghosts and witches. A conjurer uncle taught him herbal medicine and cartomancy in the early 1890s.

Jordan worked as a sharecropper in early adulthood while running a small conjure practice on the side. A conjurer cousin taught him palmistry and more herbal medicine. He sold love potions and goofer dust early on. At the same time, there were difficulties; he drank heavily and once nearly died when a neighbor slashed his neck while fighting on the way to a bar. He married Adell Cooper in 1900; apparently with his wife's approval, he had many other relationships over the years, including with his wife's younger sister Minnie, and fathered a total of 42 children into his eighties.

== Conjuring and business in "Jordanville" ==
Tired of farm work, Jordan made his spiritual practice full time in November 1921. He opened an office for conjuring in 1927 and also went into other lines of business, opening his first country store in 1925 and expanding over the years into farming, logging, mule and horse trading, and even investing in a sandlot baseball team called the Como Eagles. His conjuring business boomed after 1937 as he quit drinking, and he took in about US$100,000 annually for a period of fifteen years; "Jordanville" developed out of hundreds of people in his family or employment. He built a good reputation known up and down the East Coast. Cars from as far as New York were often seen parked on the muddy road to his home, and buses brought him patients almost daily.

Stories of Jordan's miraculous power were numerous. He bore a crystal ball said to have been produced when lightning struck a cypress tree and believed to give its finder perpetual relief from manual labor; in one of Jordan's most famous miracles, when the ball is stolen by a visitor, the thief's car catches on fire—and is extinguished when the object is returned. Some stories about Jordan highlighted his generosity, shrewdness, and wit as a faith healer, businessman, and community leader. A large part of his later career dealt with resolving marital issues. His enactment of uncrossings led to accusations of black magic. Locals respected him, partly in fear of magical punishment. When he occasionally took up legal cases, his reputation was apparently enough to make witnesses testify in his favor. Medical doctors acknowledged that he referred patients to them when he could not treat them himself.

== Death and legacy ==
Jordan died of colon cancer in 1962 at the age of 90. Folklorist F. Roy Johnson published a biography, The Fabled Doctor Jim Jordan: A Story of Conjure (1963), based partly on interviews with Jordan in the last years of his life. A multimedia performance by filmmaker Caroline Stephenson, adapted from Johnson's book, was staged in Winton in April 2013. A historic marker to Jordan was installed in Murfreesboro in 2019 by the Murfreesboro Historical Association.

== Bibliography ==
- Johnson, F. Roy (1968) [copyright 1963]. The Fabled Doctor Jim Jordan: A Story of Conjure. Murfreesboro, North Carolina: Johnson Publishing Company. OCLC 57317779.
