= The Clue of the Hissing Serpent =

1974 book by Franklin W. Dixon

- Author: Franklin W. Dixon
- Language: English
- Series: The Hardy Boys
- Genre: Detective, mystery
- Publisher: Grosset & Dunlap
- Publication date: 1974
- Publication place: United States
- Media type: Print (hardback & paperback)
- Pages: 181 pp
- ISBN: 0-448-08953-X
- OCLC: 1009042
- LC Class: PZ7.D644 Cm
- Preceded by: The Shattered Helmet
- Followed by: The Mysterious Caravan

The Clue of the Hissing Serpent is the fifty-third volume in the original The Hardy Boys series of mystery books for children and teens published by Grosset & Dunlap.

This book was written for the Stratemeyer Syndicate by Andrew E. Svenson in 1974.

== Plot summary ==
The Hardy brothers and Chet meet a wealthy balloonist named Albert Krassner, who is in possession of the Ruby King, a valuable life-sized chess piece that is the prize for a chess tournament. The boys soon learn that a gang wants to steal the Ruby King. Then the Ruby King mysteriously disappears from the Krassner safe, sending the Hardy Boys to Hong Kong. There they capture the gang and find the Ruby King.
