= Baton Records =

American record label (1954–1959)

Baton Records was an American, New York City based independent record label, launched in 1954 by record producer Sol Rabinowitz, mainly to record and release rhythm and blues music.

Baton's first record, and subsequent hit, was "A Thousand Stars" by the R&B group the Rivileers. The label's most enduring hit is arguably "Got My Mojo Working" written by Preston Foster and first recorded by singer Ann Cole in 1957. Muddy Waters claimed to have written the song and put out a recording of it on Chess Records, the same week as Cole's record was released on Baton. Waters had heard Cole sing the song while they were on tour together and adopted it as his own. A court later ruled that the song was indeed written by Foster, who [as of 1998] is still receiving royalties for "Mojo".

Rabinowitz wound up the Baton label in 1959.
