= Always Have, Always Will (Janie Fricke song) =

Single by Janie Fricke

from the album Black & White
- B-side: "Don't Put It Past My Heart"
- Released: June 1986
- Genre: Country
- Length: 3:43
- Label: Columbia
- Songwriter(s): Johnny Mears
- Producer(s): Norro Wilson

Janie Fricke singles chronology
"Easy to Please" (1986)	"Always Have, Always Will" (1986)	"When a Woman Cries" (1986)

"Always Have, Always Will" is a song written by Johnny Mears, and recorded by American country music artist Janie Fricke. It was released in June 1986 as the first single from the album Black and White. The song was Fricke's seventh and final number one on the country chart as a solo artist. The single went to number one for one week and spent fourteen weeks on the country chart.

== Chart performance ==
Chart (1986)	Peak position
US Hot Country Songs (Billboard)	1
Canadian RPM Country Tracks	1
