= Ann Cole =

American R&B and gospel singer

Background information
- Born: Cynthia Coleman; January 29, 1934; Newark, New Jersey, U.S.
- Died: November 1986 (aged 52) Newark, New Jersey, U.S.
- Genres: Soul, R&B, gospel
- Occupation: Singer
- Years active: 1949–1962
- Labels: Timely, Apollo, Baton, Sir, MGM, Roulette
- Formerly of: Colemanaires

Ann Cole (born Cynthia Coleman; January 24 or 29, 1934 – November 1986) was an American R&B and gospel singer who has been described as "a genuinely great soul singer who had the misfortune to be too far ahead of her time". She had several minor hits in the late 1950s and early 1960s, but is now most noted as the original performer of "Got My Mojo Working", later popularised by Muddy Waters.

== Life and career ==
She was born in Newark, New Jersey; her father Wallace and her uncles were members of a spiritual vocal group, the Coleman Brothers. In 1949, she formed her own singing group, the Colemanaires, with Joe Walker, Sam Walker, and Wesley Johnson. They toured throughout the US, with Cynthia as lead singer, and released several gospel records in 1953–54 on the Timely and Apollo labels. She released her first secular recordings on the Timely label in 1954, using the pseudonym "Ann Cole", and performed as a singer and pianist in bars around New York City and New Jersey. There, she was discovered by Sol Rabinowitz who was establishing a new company, Baton Records. Her first recording for Baton, a cover version of Sheb Wooley's country song "Are You Satisfied?", featuring guitar work by Mickey Baker, reached no. 10 on the Billboard R&B chart in early 1956. Later that year, she was voted the Most Promising Female R&B Vocals by Cash Box magazine. Her fourth single for Baton, "In The Chapel", on which she was backed by vocal group the Suburbans, also reached the R&B chart, in 1957.

Late in 1956, she went on a short tour through the Southern states with Muddy Waters, during which she regularly performed a new song written by Preston Foster, "Got My Mo-Jo Working". The song impressed Muddy Waters, who recorded it when he returned to Chess Records, adding some of his own words and allocating himself the songwriting credit. Ann Cole also recorded the song for Baton Records in January 1957, as a follow-up to "In The Chapel". Both versions of the song were released in the same week, but neither made the charts. A later court case resolved a dispute over the song's writing credit in favour of Foster.

Ann Cole continued to record for Baton, with little success, until 1958, and is also believed to be the uncredited female singer on Fats Domino's record "When I See You". She later recorded for the Sir, MGM and Roulette labels. Her only record for Roulette was "Have Fun", which reached no. 21 on the R&B chart at the end of 1962; its B-side, "Don't Stop The Wedding", an answer song to Etta James' "Stop The Wedding", reached no. 99 on the pop chart. Soon afterwards, she was involved in a serious car accident which ended her musical career, and she used a wheelchair for the rest of her life.

She died of a heart failure in her sleep in November 1986, aged 52. A compilation of her recordings, In the Chapel – 30 Of Her Greatest Hits!, was issued on CD in 2001. A newer compilation, Got My Mo-Jo Working 1954-1962, was issued on CD in 2023.

== Singles ==
Year	Title	Album	US R&B	UK
1956	"Are You Satisfied?"	Don't Hurt Me	10	–
1956	"In The Chapel"	Got My Mo-Jo Working	14	–
1957	"Got My Mojo Working"	Got My Mo-Jo Working	–	–
1962	"Have Fun"	30 of Her Greatest Hits	21	–
