= Rusty Draper =

American singer and radio and TV host (1923–2003)

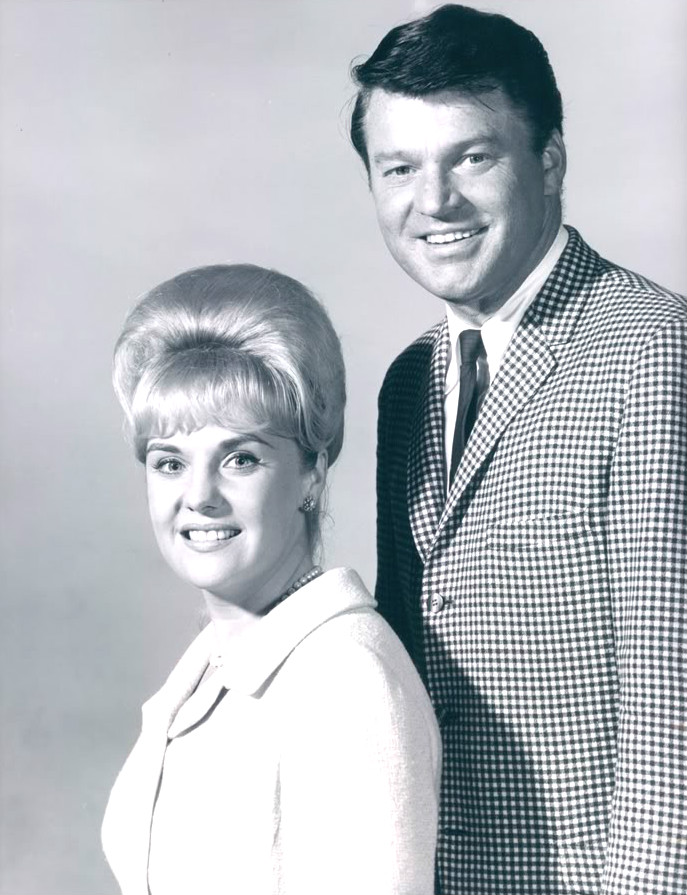
- Draper and Molly Bee as hosts of the country music television program Swingin' Country, 1966

Background information
- Born: Farrell Haliday Draper; January 25, 1923; Kirksville, Missouri, U.S.
- Died: March 28, 2003 (aged 80) Bellevue, Washington, U.S.
- Genres: Country
- Occupations: Singer; songwriter; radio announcer; TV host
- Years active: 1952–1980
- Labels: Mercury Records; Monument Records

Farrell Haliday "Rusty" Draper (January 25, 1923 – March 28, 2003) was an American country and pop singer and radio and TV host who achieved his greatest success in the 1950s.

== Biography ==
Born in Kirksville, Missouri, United States, and nicknamed "Rusty" for his red hair, he began performing on his uncle's radio show in Tulsa, Oklahoma in the mid-1930s. Draper moved on to work at radio stations in Des Moines, Iowa—sometimes filling in for sports announcer Ronald Reagan—and in Illinois before settling in California. There, he began to sing in local clubs, becoming resident singer at the Rumpus Room in San Francisco. By the early 1950s, he had begun appearing on national TV shows, including The Ed Sullivan Show (CBS) and Ozark Jubilee (ABC).

In 1952, Draper signed to Mercury Records and issued his debut single, "How Could You (Blue Eyes)". The following year, after a national club tour, his cover version of Jim Lowe's "Gambler's Guitar" made number six on both the country and pop charts, and sold a million copies, and was awarded a gold disc. After a series of less successful follow-ups, he made the national charts again in 1955 with "Seventeen" (number 18), "The Shifting, Whispering Sands" (number three, another million-seller), and "Are You Satisfied?" (number 11), becoming one of the biggest pop and country crossover stars of the period.

In 1956, he returned to the top 20 with "In The Middle Of the House" (number 20), followed up by his version of Chas McDevitt’s UK skiffle hit, "Freight Train" (number six). Draper also reached the UK Singles Chart with a rendition of "Mule Skinner Blues".

In 1962, he left Mercury to sign with Monument Records, with diminishing chart success as his style became more old-fashioned, but he continued to have minor hits in the country chart through the 1960s. He remained a steady concert draw in years to follow, and also appeared in stage musicals and on television, including his duties as one of the hosts of NBC's short-lived 1966 daytime TV series Swingin' Country.

Draper died of pneumonia in Bellevue, Washington, at the age of 80.

== Singles ==
Year	Titles (A-side, B-side) Both sides from same album except where indicated	Chart positions				Album
Year	Titles (A-side, B-side) Both sides from same album except where indicated	US	US AC	US Country	CAN CHUM	Album
1952	"I Gotta Have My Baby Back" b/w "Sing Baby Sing"	—	—	—	—	Non-album tracks
1952	"Release Me" b/w "Wedding Bells"; Both tracks with Patti Page	—	—	—	—	Non-album tracks
1953	"No Help Wanted" b/w "Texarkana Baby" (Non-album track)	10	—	—	—	Songs By Rusty Draper
1953	"Big Mamou" b/w "Why, Why, Why" (Non-album track)	—	—	—	—	Encores
1953	"Gambler's Guitar" b/w "Free Home Demonstration" (Non-album track)	6	—	6	—	Encores
1953	"Lazy River" b/w "Bummin' Around" (Non-album track)	—	—	—	—	Songs By Rusty Draper
1953	"Lighthouse" b/w "I Love To Jump" (Non-album track)	—	—	—	—	Songs By Rusty Draper
1953	"Native Dancer" b/w "Lonesome Song" (from Songs By Rusty Draper)	—	—	—	—	Encores
1954	"Peter Rabbit" b/w "Easter Mornin'"	—	—	—	—	Non-album tracks
1954	"The Train With The Rhumba Beat" b/w "Melancholy Baby" (from Songs By Rusty Draper)	—	—	—	—	Encores
1954	"Please, Please" b/w "The Workshop Of The Lord" (from Songs By Rusty Draper)	—	—	—	—	Non-album tracks
1954	"The Magic Circle" b/w "Muskrat Ramble" (from Encores)	—	—	—	—	Non-album tracks
1954	"I Got A Hole In Me Sole" b/w "Watch Your Language"; Both tracks with The Laurie Sisters	—	—	—	—	Non-album tracks
1955	"Lookin' Back To See" b/w "Shame On You"	—	—	—	—	Non-album tracks
1955	"The Ballad Of Davy Crockett" b/w "I've Been Thinkin'"	—	—	—	—	Encores
1955	"Eating Goober Peas" b/w "That's All I Need" (Non-album track)	—	—	—	—	Encores
1955	"Seventeen" b/w "Can't Live Without Them Anymore"	18	—	—	—	Encores
1955	"The Shifting Whispering Sands" b/w "Time" (Non-album track)	3	—	—	—	Songs By Rusty Draper
1955	"Are You Satisfied?" b/w "Wabash Cannonball" (from Country Classics)	11	—	—	—	All-Time Hits
1956	"Held For Questioning" b/w "Forty-Two"	60	—	—	—	Non-album tracks
1956	"The Gun Of Billy The Kid" b/w "Sometimes You Gotta Lose To Win"	—	—	—	—	Non-album tracks
1956	"House Of Cards" b/w "Rock and Roll Ruby"	—	—	—	—	Non-album tracks
1956	"In The Middle Of The House" b/w "Pink Cadillac"	20	—	—	—	Non-album tracks
1956	"Scratch My Back" b/w "Behind Those Swingin' Doors"; Both tracks with Lola Dee	—	—	—	—	Non-album tracks
1957	"Tiger Lily" b/w "Confidential" (Non-album track)	88	—	—	—	All-Time Hits
1957	"Let's Go Calypso" b/w "Should I Ever Love Again"	53	—	—	—	Non-album tracks
1957	"Freight Train" b/w "Seven Come Eleven" (Non-album track)	6	—	—	9	Country Classics
1957	"Good Golly (Pretty Molly)" b/w "No Huhu (Don't Be Mad)"	—	—	—	42	Non-album tracks
1957	"Buzz Buzz Buzz" b/w "I Get The Blues When It Rains"	—	—	—	21	Non-album tracks
1958	"That's My Doll" b/w "Gamblin' Gal"	—	—	—	—	Non-album tracks
1958	"June, July and August" b/w "Chicken-Pickin' Hawk"	—	—	—	39	Non-album tracks
1958	"Hip Monkey" b/w "You Can Depend On Me"	—	—	—	—	Non-album tracks
1958	"With This Ring" b/w "Shoppin' Around"	—	—	—	—	Non-album tracks
1959	"Hey Li Lee Li Lee Li" b/w "The Sun Will Always Shine"	—	—	—	—	Non-album tracks
1959	"Don't Forget Your Shoes" b/w "Next Stop Paradise"	—	—	—	—	Non-album tracks
1959	"I Get So Jealous" b/w "All For The Love Of Flo"	—	—	—	—	Non-album tracks
1960	"That Lucky Old Sun" b/w "Anytime"	—	—	—	—	Hits That Sold A Million
1960	"Mule Skinner Blues"^{A} /	105	—	—	—	Country & Western Golden Greats
1960	"Please Help Me, I'm Falling"	54	—	—	—	Country & Western Golden Greats
1960	"Luck Of The Irish" b/w "It's A Little More Like Heaven"	—	—	—	—	Non-album tracks
1960	"Jealous Heart" b/w "Ten Thousand Years Ago"	—	—	—	—	Non-album tracks
1961	"Another" b/w "The Meadow" (Non-album track)	—	—	—	—	Country & Western Golden Greats
1961	"Signed Sealed and Delivered" b/w "Scared To Go Home" (Non-album track)	91	20	—	8	Country & Western Golden Greats
1962	"When I've Learned" b/w "Tongue Tied Over You" (Non-album track)	—	—	—	—	Country Classics
1962	"Deep Roots" b/w "Beggar To A King" (from Country & Western Golden Greats)	—	—	—	—	Country Classics
1963	"Night Life" b/w "That's Why I Love You Like I Do" (from Swinging Country)	57	17	—	—	Night Life
1964	"The Lady Of The House" b/w "It Should Be Easier Now" (Non-album track)	—	—	—	—	Night Life
1964	"My Baby's Not Here (In Town Tonight)" b/w "Puppeteer" (Non-album track)	—	—	—	—	Swinging Country
1964	"I'm Worried About Me" b/w "When I've Learned" (Non-album track)	—	—	—	—	Swinging Country
1965	"Love Don't Grow On Trees" b/w "I Got What I Learned" (Non-album track)	—	—	—	—	Swinging Country
1965	"You Can't Be True Dear" b/w "Folsom Prison Blues"	—	—	—	—	Swinging Country
1966	"Mystery Train" b/w "Shifting Whispering Sands" (from Rusty Draper's Greatest Hits)	—	—	—	—	Swinging Country
1966	"Love Is Gone For Good" b/w "You Call Everybody Darling"	—	—	—	—	Swinging Country
1967	"My Elusive Dreams" b/w "Memory Lane" (from Swinging Country)	—	—	70	—	Non-album tracks
1968	"Buffalo Nickel" b/w "Make Believe I'm Him"	—	—	58	—	Non-album tracks
1968	"California Sunshine" b/w "The Gypsy"	—	—	70	—	Non-album tracks
1969	"Don't Build No Fences For Me" b/w "Am I That Easy To Forget"	—	—	—	—	Something Old, Something New
1969	"I Walk Alone" b/w "Sunshine Man" (Non-album track)	—	—	—	—	Something Old, Something New
1970	"Two Little Boys" b/w "It Don't Mean A Thing To Me"	—	—	73	—	Non-album tracks
1970	"Every Man Has A Prison" b/w "Tie Me To Your Apron Strings Again"	—	—	—	—	Non-album tracks
1970	"There She Goes" b/w "Travelling Song"	—	—	—	—	Non-album tracks
1980	"Harbor Lights" b/w "Ramblin' Man"	—	—	87		Non-album tracks

- ^{A} " Mule Skinner Blues " also peaked at No. 39 on the UK singles chart
