= Are You Satisfied? (song) =

Single by Rusty Draper
- B-side: "Wabash Cannonball"
- Released: November 7, 1955
- Genre: Country
- Length: 2:04
- Label: Mercury
- Songwriter(s): Homer Escamilla, Sheb Wooley

Rusty Draper singles chronology
"The Shifting, Whispering Sands" (1955)	"Are You Satisfied?" (1955)	"Held for Questioning" (1956)

"Are You Satisfied?" is a song written by Homer Escamilla and Sheb Wooley and performed by Rusty Draper featuring the Jack Halloran Singers. It reached #11 in the U.S. in 1956.

The song's orchestra was conducted by David Carroll.

== Other charting versions ==
- Wooley released a version of the song as a single in 1955 which reached #95 in the U.S.
- Ann Cole released a version of the song as a single in 1956 which reached #10 on the U.S. R&B chart.
- Toni Arden released a version of the song as a single in 1956 which reached #78 in the U.S.
- Janie Fricke released a version of the song as a single in 1987 which reached #32 on the U.S. country chart.

== Other versions ==
- Connie Francis released a version of the song as a single in 1955, but it did not chart.
- Jimmy Wakely and Gloria Wood released a version of the song as a single in 1955, but it did not chart.
- Clint Eastwood released a version of the song on his 1962 album Cowboy Favorites.
- Jimmy Walker released a version of the song as the B-side to his 1965 single "The Legend of Skull Lake".
