= Goofer dust =

Traditional hexing material in African-American hoodoo folk magic

Goofer dust is a traditional hexing material and practice of the Black American tradition of hoodoo from the Southern United States. It has roots in traditional Kongo religion.

== Etymology ==
The word goofer in goofer dust has Kongo origins and comes from the Kikongo word Kufwa which means "to die." Among older hoodoo practitioners, this derivation is very clear, because "goofer" is not only used as an adjective modifying "dust" but also a verb ("He goofered that man") and a noun ("She put a goofer on him"). As late as the 1930s, goofering was a regional synonym for hoodooing, and in North Carolina at least, the meaning of the term was broadened beyond spells of damage, illness, and death to include love spells cast with dominating intent.

A euphemistic word for goofering is "poisoning," which in this context does not refer to a physical poison but to a physical agent that, through magical means, brings about an "unnatural illness" or the death of the victim. Even more euphemistic is the special use of the verb "hurt," which is often defined as "to poison," with the tacit understanding that "to poison" really means "to goofer." The more general verbs "fix" (meaning to prepare a spell) and "trick" (meaning to cast a spell) are also applied to goofering.

== Description ==
It can generally refer to any powder used to cast a spell, especially if harmful in nature, but specifically refers to a concoction of natural ingredients that can be used to cause harm, trouble or even kill an enemy. Some historical sources, such as some of the interviews conducted by Harry M. Hyatt, indicate goofer dust can be synonymous with graveyard dirt.

== Use ==
In practice, it was often used to create illness in victims, such as swelling of the legs or blindness. Recipes for making it vary, but primarily include graveyard dirt and snakeskin. Other ingredients may include ash, powdered sulfur, salt, powdered bones, powdered insect chitin, dried manure, herbs, spices and "anvil dust" — the fine black iron detritus found around a blacksmith's anvil. On page 162 of his autobiography Dr. John / Mac Rebennack wrote: "Goofer dust is a combination of dirt from a graveyard, gunpowder, and grease from them (St. Roch Cemetery, New Orleans) bells." The result usually varies in color from "a fine yellowish-grey" to deep "black dust" depending on the formula, and it may be mixed with local dirt to conceal its deployment.

In the modern day, formulations may be thought to include anything harmful that can come to hand. For example, insecticide powders might be mixed with expired medications, dried medical waste, etc. Regardless of any intended magical effects, synergies between the ingredients might cause real medical harm.

It is sometimes used in love spells of a coercive nature, the severity of which range from the goofer dust being used to provoke helpful spirits to coax the target into love, to the more extreme "love me or die" spells. Rarely, it has been used in gambling spells.

Goofer Dust has also been used as a protection spell. In the 1820s and 1830s on a plantation, an enslaved conjurer in his fifties named Dinky used goofer dust for protection.

== In popular culture ==
In the 1954 Cold War classic Night People, Col. Steve Van Dyke (Gregory Peck) spiked a bottle of absinthe with a packet of goofer dust. The X-Files, in Episode 14 of season 7 (Theef), referenced the use of goofer dust by the vengeful father of a woman who died due to poor hospital care. Goofer dust was referenced to protect against hellhounds in the television show Supernatural, Season 2, episode 8 "Crossroad Blues" in Season 8, episode 14 "Trial and Error", and in Season 12, episode 15 "Somewhere Between Heaven and Hell".

Goofer dust is mentioned in the Willie Mabon blues song "I Don't Know". It was also used in the song "I Got My Mojo Workin". In "Treemonisha" by Scott Joplin, Zodzetrick refers to himself as the goofer dus' man and 'King of Goofer Dus' Land'. Lil Johnson recorded a song called "Goofer Dust Swing" in 1937. Michael Ondaatje refers to goofer dust on page three of Coming Through Slaughter. Colson Whitehead's 2016 novel The Underground Railroad speaks of a slaveowner hiring a witch to "goofer his property" to prevent anyone from escaping.

On their 2023 album Quaker City Quiet Pills, punk rock band The Dead Milkmen included a track called "Hen’s Teeth and Goofa Dust".

In their 1936 performance of "Lucky Number" from the film "The Black Network", Fayard Nicholas of the Nicholas Brothers, sings "[I] put my trust in 'goofer dust'..."
