= Juju =

West African spiritual belief system

Juju (also styled or romanized as ju-ju) is a spiritual belief system and group of associated practices incorporating the use of ritual objects, such as amulets and spells, affiliated with religious observances in central West Africa, namely by the people of Nigeria, Benin, Togo, Cameroon and Ghana.

The term has been applied to traditional Western African religions, which incorporated the use of objects such as amulets, and spells into spiritual practices. In a general sense, the term "juju" can be used to refer to magical properties dealing with luck, whether good or bad.

== Etymology ==
The term juju has origins in the Hausa language where it means "evil spirit." Some believe it is derived from the French word joujou, which means "plaything."

== History ==
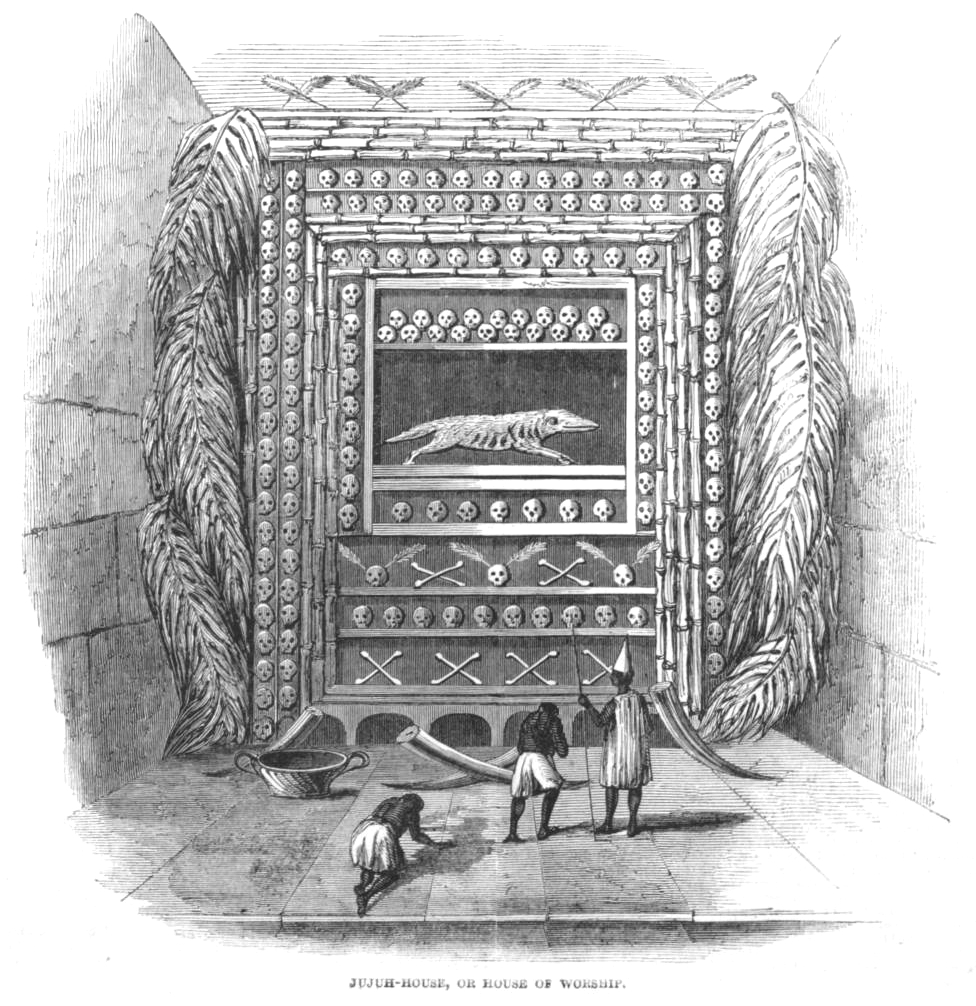
An 1850 illustration of a "Jujuh house" on the Bight of Benin showing fetishised skulls and bones

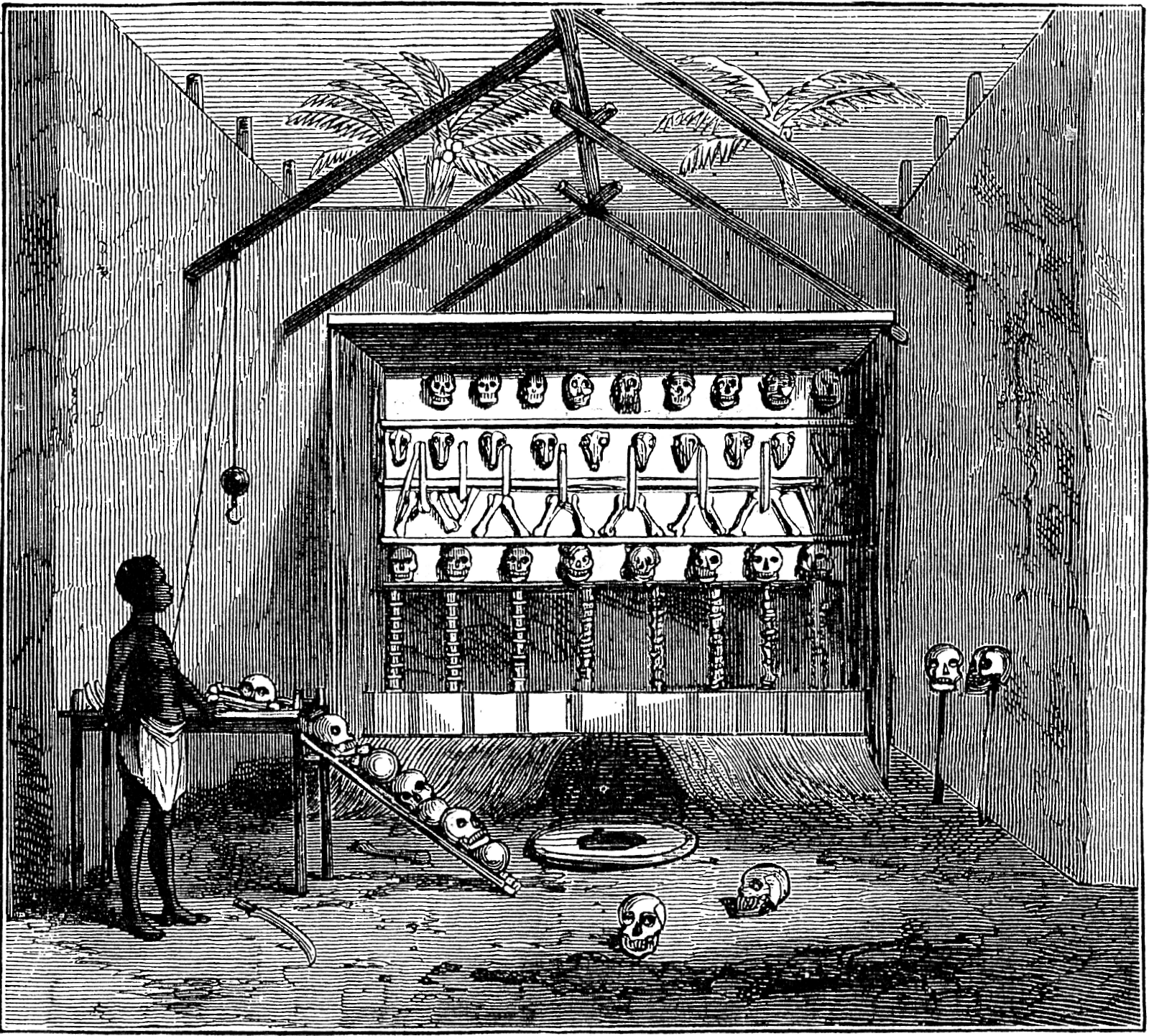
An 1873 Victorian illustration of a "Ju-ju house" in the same location

The belief system is recorded by Sir James George Frazer in Folk-Lore (Vol. XXVI), under the title, "A Priest-King in Nigeria", from a communication received from Mr. P. A. Talbot, District Commissioner in S. Nigeria.

Talbot states that the dominant Ju-Ju of Elele, a town in the northwest of the Degema district, is a Priest-King, elected for a term of seven years. "The whole prosperity of the town, especially the fruitfulness of farm, byre, and marriage-bed, was linked with his life. Should he fall sick, therefore, it entailed famine and grave disaster upon the inhabitants ..."

Le Comte C. N. de Cardi documented its practice amongst the Igbos, Ibibios, and Yoruba peoples of the Niger Delta in an 1899 article, and Alan Maxwell Boisragon in a book of 1897.

== Practices ==
Juju is a folk magic in West Africa; within juju, a variety of concepts exist. Juju charms and spells can be used to inflict either bad or good juju. A "juju man" is any man vetted by local traditions and well versed in traditional spiritual medicines. The word Juju is used in the West African Diaspora to describe all forms of charms made in African Diaspora Religions and African Traditional Religions.

According to some authors, "It is neither good nor bad, but it may be used for constructive purposes as well as for nefarious deeds." It is most commonly used for treating both physical and spiritual ailments. For example, when used with positive intentions, it can be used for healing insect and animal bites as well as counteracting and neutralizing curses. Juju is sometimes used to enforce a contract or ensure compliance. In a typical scenario, the witch doctor casting the spell requires payment for this service.

When used negatively, Juju can be used to enact revenge, out of jealousy and cause misfortune in general. It can be done as simply as sending a vessel of any kind infused with negative energy to the intended person.

Crimes have been committed (human trafficking being the most extreme and prominent example) while utilizing the practice. 19th century venturers, and merchants of the Niger Delta and Benin documented and published accounts of:

- Animal sacrifice
- Cannibalism
- Curses
- Female genital mutilation
- Human Sacrifice, including:
  - Albino sacrifice
  - Judicial Sacrifice
  - Slave Sacrifice
  - Twin Sacrifice
  - Widow Sacrifice

These practices persist to the present.

== See also ==
- Abwoi religion
- Mana
- Ogboni
