= Medicine bag =

Traditional North American Indian pouch

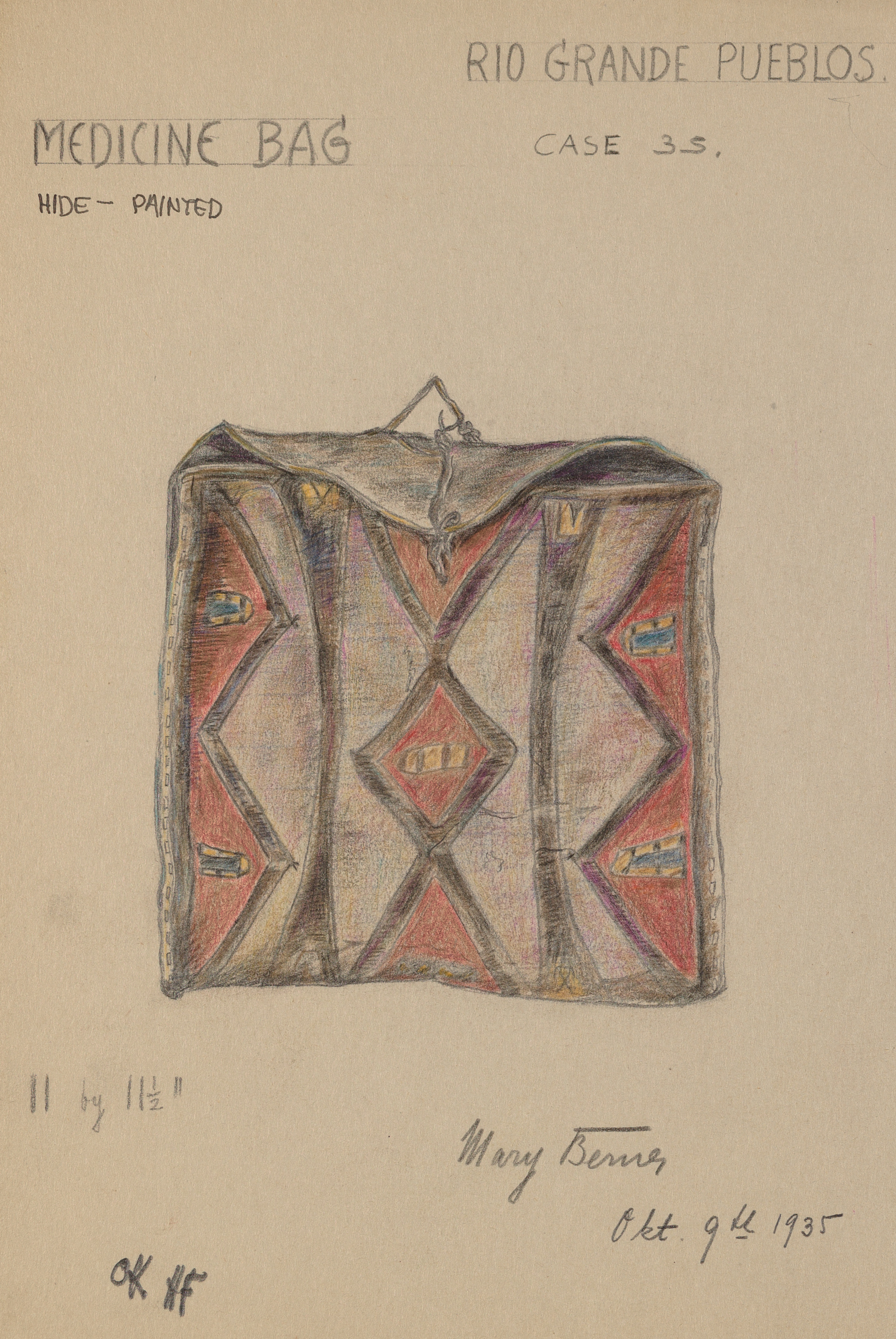
1935 drawing of a medicine bag

A medicine bag is usually a small pouch, worn by some Indigenous peoples of the Americas, that contains sacred items. A personal medicine bag may contain objects that symbolize personal well-being and tribal identity. Traditionally, medicine bags are worn under the clothing. Their contents are private, and often of a personal, spiritual, and religious nature.

== See also ==
- Medicine man
- Midewiwin
- Medicine wheel
