= I'm Leslie Knope =

- Parks and Recreation episode
- Episode no.: Season 4 Episode 1
- Directed by: Troy Miller
- Written by: Dan Goor
- Original air date: September 22, 2011

Guest appearances
- Patricia Clarkson as Tammy Swanson; Andy Forrest as Kyle; Kirk Fox as Joe Fantringham; Jay Jackson as Perd Hapley; Antonia Raftu as Elizabeth; Ben Schwartz as Jean-Ralphio Saperstein; Johnny Sneed as William Barnes; Cooper Thornton as Dr. Harris

Episode chronology
← Previous "Li'l Sebastian"	Next → "Ron and Tammys"
- Parks and Recreation season 4

"I'm Leslie Knope" is the first episode of the fourth season of the American comedy television series Parks and Recreation, and the 47th overall episode of the series. It originally aired on NBC in the United States on September 22, 2011. In the episode, Leslie Knope (Amy Poehler) faces trouble telling Ben Wyatt (Adam Scott) that she is running for public office, which will cause them to have to end their secret relationship. Meanwhile, Ron braces himself for the arrival of his first ex-wife, "Tammy I".

Written by Dan Goor and directed by Troy Miller, the episode marks the beginning of Leslie Knope's campaign for public office. During the episode, Andy Dwyer (Chris Pratt) is given a promotion and becomes Leslie's campaign assistant. The episode featured the first appearance by guest star Patricia Clarkson as Ron's first ex-wife Tammy, who appeared in a multi-episode arc.

According to Nielsen Media Research, "I'm Leslie Knope" was seen by 4.11 million households in the 18 to 49 age demographic. It received generally positive reviews, with commentators highlighting the characteristic developments and the effectiveness of the plot involving Leslie's city council campaign.

== Plot ==
Taking place later the same night as last season's finale, Leslie tells Ann that she was approached by William and Elizabeth, political scouts who recommended she run for higher office. Leslie is conflicted about running due to her romantic relationship with Ben, which would cause a possible scandal since he is Assistant City Manager. Meanwhile, upon learning that his first ex-wife Tammy has arrived in town, Ron grabs an emergency survival bag and flees to live in the wilderness for 180 days.

Picking up three weeks later, an e-mail with a picture of a man's genitals is sent to all of the female employees. While Chris and Ben investigate, Leslie is sent to do damage control by having a televised interview with reporter Perd Hapley. The interview goes so well that the scouts decide to have Leslie announce her candidacy for city council that Friday, rather than their original plan of three months later. Leslie panics because she had been putting off ending things with Ben, and she panics further when Ben presents her with a gift during a dinner, causing her to also flee to the wilderness to hide out with Ron. Tom visits the parks department with promotional material from his new job at Entertainment 720, where he works with Jean-Ralphio, but not even he is sure what Entertainment 720 does. He offers Andy a job, but Andy turns him down, unsure of where to go with his life.

Ann informs Chris that the genitals in the picture show symptoms of mumps. Chris and Ben discover that Joe from the sewage department sent the e-mail and fire him, and Chris announces Ann's discovery to everyone. This prompts male employees to e-mail Ann pictures of their genitals because they are worried that they caught the mumps from Joe, so Chris has Dr. Harris come in to perform tests on everyone. At Ron's cabin, Leslie and Ron both realize they cannot run away from their problems and return to the parks department. Ron tells everyone that Leslie is going to be running for city council and will need an assistant to help her with the extra work, so April suggests Andy, who is hired. Leslie later meets with Ben to break up with him, but to her surprise, the gift she left unwrapped at dinner is a "Knope 2012" button; by seeing how Leslie was acting, Ben deduced that she was offered an opportunity to run for elected office, and the two break up amicably. She later announces her candidacy for city council. Tammy I—who is an IRS agent—later meets up with Ron in his office and hands him audit papers.

== Production ==
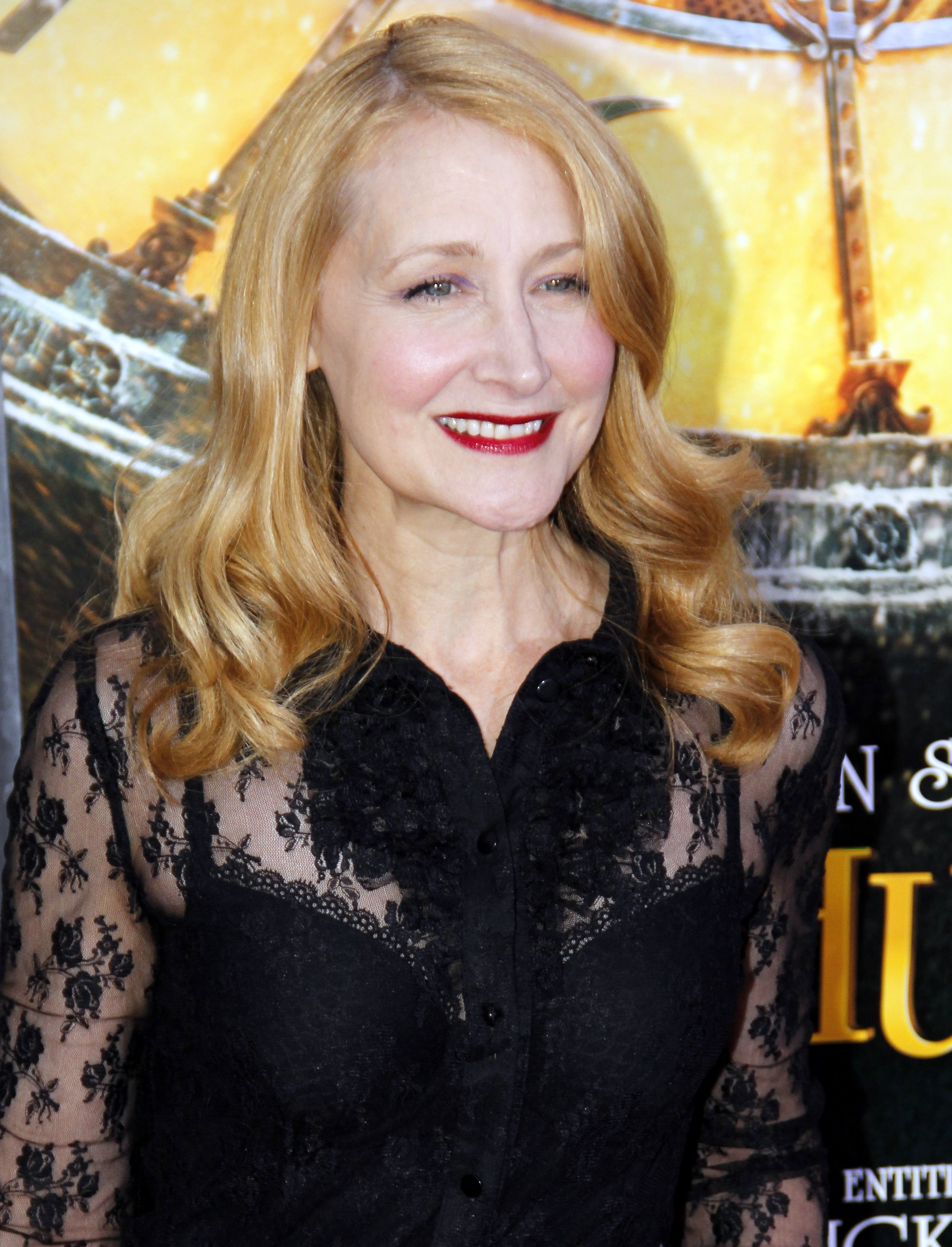
Patricia Clarkson guest starred in this episode as Ron Swanson's ex-wife "Tammy I".

"I'm Leslie Knope" was written by Dan Goor and directed by Troy Miller. It featured a guest appearance by Patricia Clarkson as Ron's first ex-wife, "Tammy I", who previously appeared in the third season finale episode "Li'l Sebastian", but was never shown to the audience until the end of "I'm Leslie Knope". The episode also featured guest appearances by common members of the recurring cast, including Ben Schwartz as Tom's friend and business partner Jean-Ralphio Saperstein, Cooper Thornton as Dr. Harris, and stand-up comedian Kirk Fox as the sewage department member Joe, who was fired from his job in this episode. Antonia Raftu and Johnny Sneed appear as Leslie's campaign managers Elizabeth and William Barnes, respectively - they previously appeared at the end of the season 3 finale "Li'l Sebastian".

The episode featured the friendly breakup of Leslie and Ben to avoid a scandal during Leslie's campaign for city council. The characters had previously begun dating following much romantic buildup in the third season, but had to keep the relationship a secret due to Chris' strict policy against boss-employee relationships within the department. Series co-creator Michael Schur commented on this in an interview, saying "...there's not just what is right for the characters, but what is right for the show and other considerations going into it. It's not just a perfect, delicate beautiful butterfly that's slowly unfolding its wings over the course of an entire season of TV." He likened the relationship to the Jim and Pam romance in The Office, stating that ignorance of the decision-making process behind the story would have likely reduced its enjoyment. Schur reported that he had discussed the topic with various people including Poehler, Scott, and Schur's own wife, and felt that the breakup better suited the ambitious nature of Leslie's character.

The episode also continues the story of Tom and Jean-Ralphio's company Entertainment 720, whose headquarters are located in a fully white office decorated with oddly shaped furniture. Schur had previously likened the office to a "hallucinogenic nightmare" and called it "maybe the craziest thing that's ever been on our series".

== Cultural references ==
The side-story in which Joe of the sewage department sends a picture of his penis to every woman in the department parodies the 2011 Anthony Weiner sexting scandals, during which congressman Weiner sent sexually suggestive photos to various women.

== Reception ==
=== Ratings ===
The season premiere aired on Thursday, September 22, 2011, and was watched by 4.11 million viewers with a 2.1/6 ratings share in the 18-49 age group. This was considerably lower than the previous season's premiere, "Go Big or Go Home", which was watched by 6.19 million households and was the most-watched Parks episode since its debut.

=== Reviews ===
"I'm Leslie Knope" received generally positive reviews from critics. Alan Sepinwall of HitFix praised Ron's implementation of physical comedy, and felt Leslie and Ben's breakup was handled "very, very well". He also praised the chemistry between Poehler and Offerman. He also stated that Clarkson's cameo set the stage well for the next episode. Steve Heisler of The A.V. Club called Leslie's storyline "excellent" and, like Sepinwall, praised her chemistry with Ron, as well as Ben. He also praised Chris' scenes in the picture subplot, feeling it improved the story. He ultimately gave the episode a B+. IGN's Matt Fowler wrote that the premiere “brought both the laughs and the heartache” and that Parks and Recreation “has always been great at giving us just enough of its characters' relationships and then ending them before they out-stay their welcome.”

Blair Marnell of Crave Online, giving the episode an 8.5 out of 10, praised the performances of Rashida Jones and Kirk Fox in the picture mystery subplot, and also felt that Leslie's city council campaign was the "right direction" for the character. Conversely, Kris King of StarPulse called the picture subplot "silly" and didn't feel it allowed to episode to go anywhere, though he did express interest in the expansion of Clarkson's role, and praised the scenes with Ron. In contrast, Jordan Cramer of TV Overmind felt Ann's story "outshined" that of Leslie, praising the episode for its timeliness in parodying the Anthony Weiner scandal.
