= Ron and Tammys =

- Parks and Recreation episode
- Episode no.: Season 4 Episode 2
- Directed by: Randall Einhorn
- Written by: Norm Hiscock
- Original air date: September 29, 2011

Guest appearances
- Patricia Clarkson as Tammy Swanson (Tammy I); Paula Pell as Tamara Swanson (Tammy Zero)

Episode chronology
← Previous "I'm Leslie Knope"	Next → "Born & Raised"
- Parks and Recreation season 4

"Ron and Tammys" is the second episode of the fourth season of the NBC sitcom Parks and Recreation. It originally aired on NBC on September 29, 2011. In the episode, Ron Swanson (Nick Offerman) is confronted by his first ex-wife, Tammy 1 (Patricia Clarkson) who has a malevolent influence on him, and Leslie Knope (Amy Poehler) becomes involved in Ron's personal life. This episode marks the first and only appearance of Ron's mother, Tamara (Paula Pell). It garnered 4.33 million viewers, an increase in viewers from the previous episode's 4.11 million.

== Plot ==
Leslie is preparing for the "battle royale": a big meeting between all departments where they argue over funding. Ron's intimidating presence and libertarian beliefs are pivotal for the Parks department to succeed in getting more funds over other departments, but he is too busy preparing for his upcoming tax audit served to him by his first ex-wife, Tammy 1. Leslie, Andy Dwyer, and April Ludgate help Ron but discover he has few actual receipts, just notes of purchase that he wrote himself and photographs of gentlemen's agreements. He does, however, have large amounts of gold that he has buried all over Pawnee. Ron explains that Tammy 1 had been present throughout most of his young life: she delivered him as a baby, was his teacher, and she even took his virginity. However, she was cold and controlling, which forever turned Ron off blonde women after their divorce.

Tammy 1 is horrified at Ron's recordkeeping and demands access to every part of his life for the audit. Tammy 1's strict maternal nature intimidates everyone into following her orders, which impresses April. Over the course of the next week, Tammy 1 moves back in with Ron and assumes complete control over him. Ron shaves off his moustache, becomes outwardly cheerful and friendly, and refuses to do anything without Tammy 1's approval. Leslie needs Ron to be his usual gruff self for the battle royale and confronts Tammy 1 about the audit, which she admits is fake - she decided to take Ron back after learning about all the gold he had.

Leslie asks Ron's second ex-wife Tammy 2 for help, who explains that even she is scared of Tammy 1 after Tammy 1 attacked her with acid. They decide to ask Ron's survivalist mother, Tamara - nicknamed Tammy, or Tammy 0 - for help and she agrees. Tammy 0 challenges Tammy 1 to a "prairie drink-off" of highly alcoholic Swanson family mash liquor, on the condition that Ron will return to the farm forever if she wins. Leslie enters the drinking contest to save Ron from his mother and ex-wife, but the liquor immediately makes her too drunk to continue. Ron, finally fed up over people controlling him, drinks the entire contents of the jug and tells both Tammys to leave him alone.

In a subplot, Tom Haverford asks Ben Wyatt to look over the finances of his company, Entertainment 720. Ben discovers that Tom and Jean-Ralphio Saperstein are wasting large amounts of money on a state-of-the-art office, giving employees high salaries with full benefits, and paying Detlef Schrempf and Roy Hibbert to play basketball all day, despite having no income. They ignore Ben's warnings that the company will go bankrupt in a month, but Tom later apologizes to Ben after discovering that he was right.

In another subplot, Ann Perkins asks Chris Traeger to film a quick Public Service Announcement about diabetes, but the overly-enthusiastic Chris spends all day doing countless takes, making Ann wonder why she even dated him in the first place.

== Reception ==
Many critics gave praise to the episode. Matt Fowler of IGN called it "the perfect call-back episode." Steve Heisler of The A.V. Club described it as "a hilarious ode to Parks & Rec’s characters."
