= Li'l Sebastian =

- Parks and Recreation episode
- Episode no.: Season 3 Episode 16
- Directed by: Dean Holland
- Written by: Daniel J. Goor
- Original air date: May 19, 2011

Guest appearances
- Andrew Burlinson as Wyatt "Burly" Burlinson; Andy Forrest as Kyle; Megan Mullally as Tammy Swanson; Antonia Raftu as Elizabeth; Mark Rivers as Drummer; Detlef Schrempf as himself; Ben Schwartz as Jean-Ralphio Saperstein; Johnny Sneed as William Barnes; Talia Tabin as Tessa; Cooper Thornton as Dr. Harris; Alan Yang as Bass Player; Biff Yeager as George

Episode chronology
← Previous "The Bubble"	Next → "I'm Leslie Knope"
- Parks and Recreation season 3

"Li'l Sebastian" is the sixteenth episode and season finale of the third season of the American comedy television series Parks and Recreation, and the 46th overall episode of the series. It originally aired on NBC in the United States on May 19, 2011. In the episode, as the parks department prepares a funeral for Pawnee's famous miniature horse Li'l Sebastian, Leslie and Ben struggle to keep their workplace romance a secret. The episode was written by Daniel J. Goor and directed by Dean Holland.

"Li'l Sebastian", which originally aired back-to-back with "The Bubble", ended with several major developments. These included Leslie being approached to run for political office, and Tom's decision to quit his job to run an entertainment company. The exact outcome of the newly introduced storylines had not yet been determined when the episode first aired. The writing staff considered killing off a human character instead of Li'l Sebastian, but decided against it. Series co-creator Michael Schur called the episode's final scene, which was filmed in the completely white, 15,000-square-foot (1,400 m^{2}) office of Tom's entertainment company, "maybe the craziest thing that's ever been on our series."

The episode featured guest appearances by Megan Mullally as Ron's ex-wife Tammy, Ben Schwartz as Tom's friend Jean-Ralphio and retired basketball player Detlef Schrempf as himself. "Li'l Sebastian" received critical acclaim and, according to Nielsen Media Research, was seen by an estimated 3.72 million household viewers. Combined with an estimated 4.27 million household viewers with "The Bubble," the two episodes' ratings were about even with the previous week's episodes, "The Fight" and "Road Trip."

== Plot ==
Leslie announces Li'l Sebastian, Pawnee's beloved celebrity miniature horse, has died and the parks department will hold a memorial service for him. Tom suggests they hire Entertainment 720 for the event, a production company recently started by his friend Jean-Ralphio. Jean-Ralphio encourages Tom to come work with him on the company, but Tom is reluctant to leave his city hall job. Meanwhile, the extremely health-conscious Chris finds out he has tendonitis, and takes the news so seriously that he questions his own mortality. Leslie and Ben continue their romance despite a no-dating policy at city hall, but they have difficulty keeping it a secret. Ron finds out and warns them that Chris will fire them if he learns about it.

As the city prepares for the memorial service, Leslie and Ben are caught making out by a maintenance worker named George, so they send him home with a gift certificate in exchange for his silence. Unfortunately, George had the propane for Li'l Sebastian's eternal flame, which results in later confusion behind the scenes, that Leslie and Ben struggle to fix throughout the night. Jerry is sent to get propane for the flame but buys lighter fluid instead; this causes a huge fireball to shoot into the air when Ron lights it, which singes off his eyebrows, part of his mustache and hair. Leslie and Ben are relieved, however, when the crowd applauds in the belief the fireball was staged. Entertainment 720's show also proves to be a hit with the crowd, which makes Tom further contemplate quitting his job.

At a party afterward, Andy receives praise for his Li'l Sebastian tribute song, "5,000 Candles in the Wind." April sells many Mouse Rat CDs at an inflated price, which spurs Andy to ask her to become the group's manager. Indirectly responsible for nearly killing Ron, Leslie and Ben agree to no more secret displays of affection at work. Ann, who previously dated Chris and had trouble getting over him, offers comfort to Chris for his depression. This makes him appear romantically interested in Ann once again. A conflicted Tom decides to resign and accept a job with Entertainment 720. Meanwhile, Ron is confronted by his evil ex-wife Tammy at the party. But both Ron and Tammy are horrified to learn his other ex-wife, also named Tammy (whom he calls "Tammy 1") has also arrived in town.

Leslie is approached by scouts looking for potential candidates for elected office, which has always been one of her dreams. Impressed by the memorial service and the harvest festival Leslie previously organized, they believe she would be a good candidate for upcoming city council seats, or possibly the mayoral position. With the expected increased media attention on her personal life, the scouts ask whether Leslie has any secret scandals in her life. She denies any such scandals exist, thus omitting her secret relationship with Ben, and the scouts promise to contact her about preparing an electoral run.

== Production ==
Basically, [the] theory was, you swing for the fences. You're trying to do an episode that's so compelling that you're going to have people waiting all summer to find out how you solved the problems you created. I am a big believer that people should be in a very different place at the end of every season than they were at the beginning of the season.

— Michael Schur, series co-creator, on the twists in "Li'l Sebastian"

"Li'l Sebastian", the third season finale of Parks and Recreation, was written by Daniel J. Goor and directed by Dean Holland. It was originally broadcast on May 19, 2011, and ran back-to-back with the episode "The Bubble", which aired immediately before. The two are stand-alone episodes that were not originally designed to be shown together. However, because the show premiered late as a mid-season replacement in January, the two episodes aired together so the third season could conclude at the end of the television season.

The final few minutes of "Li'l Sebastian" introduced major developments for several of the characters, including Leslie being approached with the idea to run for elected office, which has been a lifelong dream for her. Additionally, Tom decides to leave city hall to pursue his entrepreneurial ambitions, a progression of his character that had been building throughout the third season. Series co-creator Michael Schur said he believes characters should change and their situations should change throughout the season, so he wanted them to be in a very different place at the end of the season than where they were from the beginning. Schur also described his fellow co-creator Greg Daniels' theory about finale episodes as: "write the juiciest, most exciting cliffhanger-y possible scenario you can write, and then you have all summer to figure out how to get yourself out of it". Although Schur said the writing staff had a general idea of where the newly introduced storylines should go, the exact stories had not been completely worked out yet and the writers would be brainstorming how to handle them over the summer.

"Li'l Sebastian" featured a guest appearance by Megan Mullally as Ron's ex-wife, Tammy Swanson. Mullally, the real-life wife of Nick Offerman, previously appeared in the episodes "Ron and Tammy" and "Ron & Tammy: Part Two". Ben Schwartz reprised his recurring role as Tom's friend Jean-Ralphio Saperstein. The episode also features a cameo appearance by Detlef Schrempf, a retired basketball player who played for the Indiana Pacers; Parks and Recreation is set in Indiana. Schrempf plays himself in the episode and is hired by Tom's new entertainment company to simply hang around the office and play basketball. Schrempf previously appeared in the second season episode "Telethon". Andy's band Mouse Rat, which has appeared in previous episodes starting with the first season finale "Rock Show", also appeared in "Li'l Sebastian". Mark Rivers played the drums, Andrew Burlinson played guitar and Parks screenwriter Alan Yang played bass guitar.

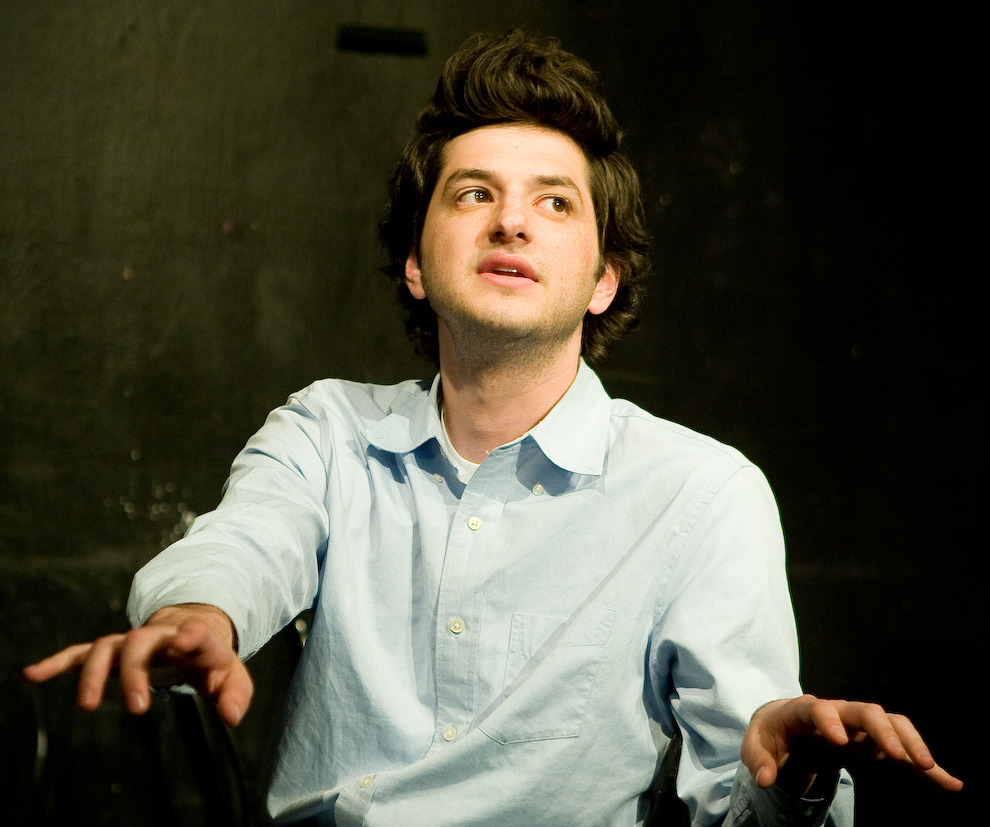
Ben Schwartz appeared as recurring character Jean-Ralphio Saperstein in "Li'l Sebastian", where he and Tom start their own company together.

The character Li'l Sebastian, a miniature horse beloved by the residents of Pawnee, was first introduced in "Harvest Festival", which was also written by Goor. The writers considered having a human character die in "Li'l Sebastian" rather than the miniature horse, like previously mentioned characters Mayor Gunderson or Councilman Bill Dexhart. However, they decided that having an animal character die felt less morbid and more appropriate for the finale of a comedy series. The episode ends with Tom and Jean-Ralphio in their new Entertainment 720 headquarters, a completely white 15,000-square-foot (1,400 m^{2}) room with modern decor and unusual furniture. Schur described the setting as "maybe the craziest thing that's ever been on our series. ... Every time I watch it in the edit bay, I have this weird crisis: 'Is this OK that this scene is how we're ending this entire season?' It's truly nuts. It's like a hallucinogenic nightmare."

Schur said his favorite scene in the episode was when Leslie arrives at her secret meet-up spot with Ben, only to find Ron waiting there, and awkwardly tries to insist there is no affair. Schur said: "The scene that unfolds is my favorite Leslie Knope moment of the whole year. [Ron] almost doesn't say a word for the entire scene, but still makes you laugh 50 times." Immediately after "Li'l Sebastian" first aired, a "Producer's Cut" version was made available on the official NBC.com website, which included an additional six minutes of material.

== Cultural references ==
While trying to have a moment of silence for Li'l Sebastian in the parks department office, the staff is interrupted by a custodian playing the Shania Twain song "Man! I Feel Like a Woman!" on his radio. This scene was actually based on something that happened in the writer's room. Ron discovers Leslie and Ben's affair after they accidentally pocket dial him while sexually role-playing with political figures. At one point, Leslie tells Ben she is going to kiss him both like former First Lady Eleanor Roosevelt, and former Associate Justice of the Supreme Court Ruth Bader Ginsburg. At another, Ben impersonates former President Ronald Reagan, which prompts Leslie, pretending to be United Kingdom Prime Minister Margaret Thatcher, to say, "Oh, President Reagan, my blazer popped open." In a different scene, Andy seeks to write a song for Li'l Sebastian that is 5,000 times better than Elton John's "Candle in the Wind", which inspires him to write the original song "5,000 Candles in the Wind". Other songs played during Li'l Sebastian's memorial service include "Wild Horses" by The Rolling Stones and "A Horse with No Name" by America. In an attempt to explain to someone that she and Ben were hugging, Leslie explains she recently won a MacArthur Genius Grant and that Ben was simply congratulating her. In addition, during Tom and Jean-Ralphio's eulogy presentation for Lil' Sebastian, a still of the Trifid Nebula in Sagittarius is seen. The image is more popularly recognized as the cover art for progressive rock band King Crimson's 1971 album Islands.

== Reception ==
=== Ratings ===
Due to the 9 p.m. broadcast of "Search Committee", the one-hour seventh season finale of comedy series The Office, Parks and Recreation was not shown in its regular 9:30 p.m. broadcast on May 19. "Li'l Sebastian" aired at 10:30 p.m., immediately following "The Bubble" at 10 p.m. In its original American broadcast, "Li'l Sebastian" was seen by an estimated 3.72 million household viewers, according to Nielsen Media Research, with a 2.4 rating/6 share among viewers between ages 18 and 49. A rating point represents one percent of the total number of television sets in American households, and a share means the percentage of television sets in use tuned to the program. This marked a drop in viewership for Parks and Recreation compared to earlier in the night, as "The Bubble" was seen by an estimated 4.27 million households. Combined, the ratings were about even with the average ratings for the previous week, in which two Parks and Recreation episodes were also shown back-to-back, although from a 9:30 p.m. to 10:30 p.m. time block: "The Fight" had been seen by an estimated 4.55 million household viewers, while "Road Trip" was seen by 3.54 million households. In its 10:30 p.m. timeslot, "Li'l Sebastian" was outperformed by the fourth season finale of the ABC medical drama series Private Practice, which was seen by 7.45 million household viewers.

=== Reviews ===
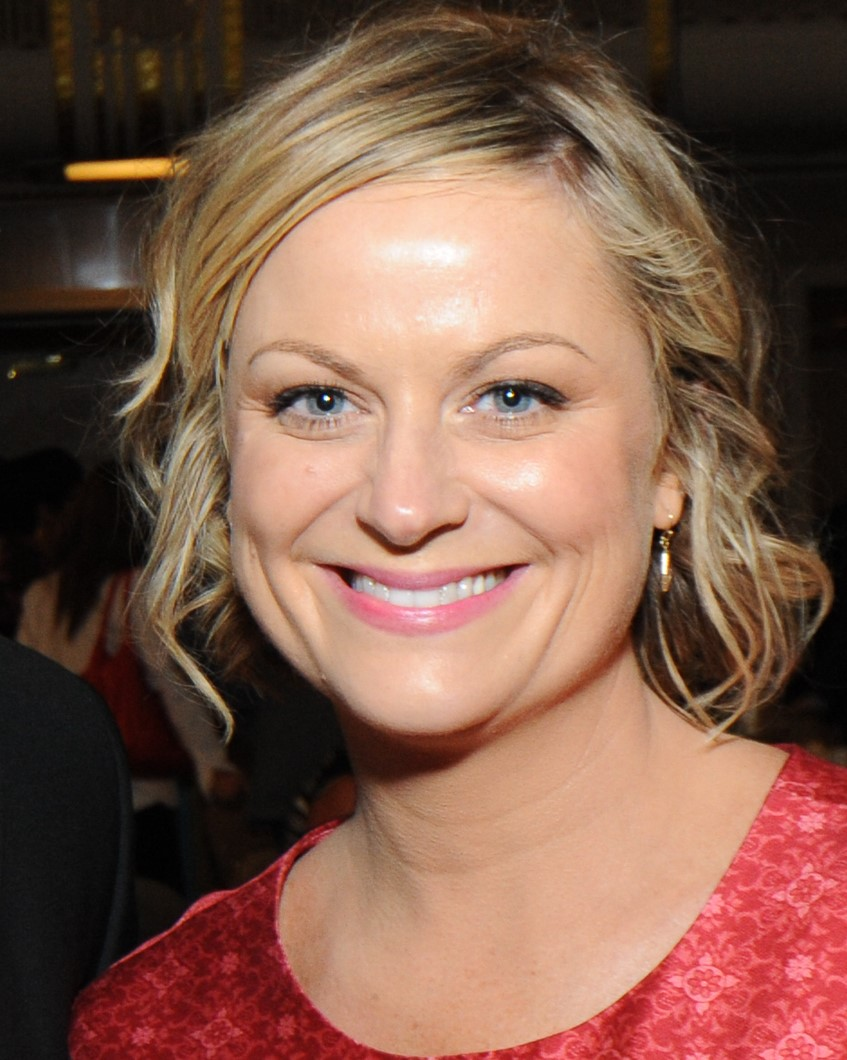
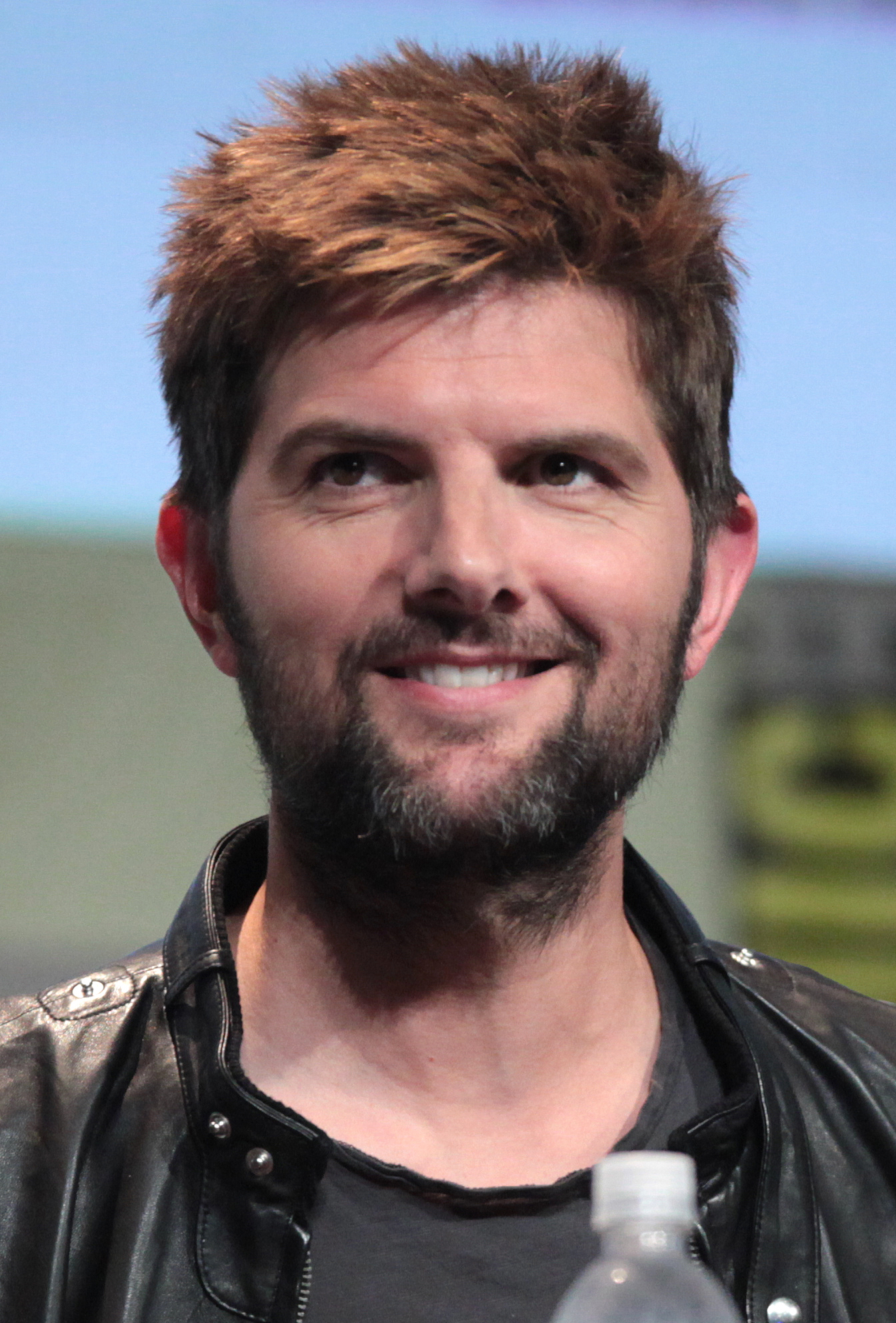
Several critics praised the scenes with Leslie and Ben, played by Amy Poehler and Adam Scott

"Li'l Sebastian" received highly positive reviews. Steve Heisler of The A.V. Club called it the best Parks and Recreation episode so far, and compared the cliffhanger and "many of the bittersweet moments leading to it" to the comedy series Freaks and Geeks. James Poniewozik of Time magazine strongly praised "Li'l Sebastian", and called it one of the best episodes of the season. He said Li'l Sebastian's funeral brought out the best in the characters, and that the episode "combined slapstick, authentic stakes and a holistic picture of the oddball history and commonalities that bond the folks we've come to know in Pawnee". Henry Hanks of CNN called it "one of the funniest half-hours of any show this season", and compared the Li'l Sebastian funeral to the funeral scenes in the Mary Tyler Moore Show episode "Chuckles Bites the Dust". The Atlantic writer Scott Meslow called the episode a "triumphant exclamation point at the end of Parks and Recreation's third season", and described every moment as "uproariously funny". Meslow particularly praised the twists and major character developments of the final 10 minutes, and said it demonstrates how much the show and characters have changed since the series debuted.

Eric Sundermann of Hollywood.com said "Li'l Sebastian" was a great showcase for not only each of the characters, but the setting of Pawnee as well, and that the episode "illustrated each part of Pawnee that we have come to know and love so much". Alan Sepinwall of HitFix said it had "both the scope and the out-of-control but not frantic style" of "The Harvest Festival". He also enjoyed the scene with Leslie and Ben, and said he believed the show could get great "comic mileage" out of their continued secret relationship together. Paste magazine writer Garrett Martin called the episode a "tour de force that expertly wrapped up an excellent season". Garrett said the show's characters were "so vivid and instantly memorable" that the death of Li'l Sebastian really felt like a major event, even though he had only previously appeared in one other episode. Matt Fowler of IGN said "Li'l Sebastian" was hilarious and demonstrated "how marvelously great this series is at creating a truly lovable ensemble". He also enjoyed seeing Tom succeed with his concert, and claimed the Li'l Sebastian funeral scene was surprisingly powerful.

Rick Porter of Zap2it said Parks was at the "top of its game". Porter praised that the final scenes presented so many changes for the characters but never felt out of control, which he attributed to "the cast's ability to play things at just the right level and the writers for knowing just how cartoonish Pawnee can be without tipping too far". New York magazine writer Steve Kandell said although the episode felt like a "somber affair" and less momentous than the previous episode "Harvest Festival", he said the cliffhangers were suspenseful and on par with major drama shows like the ABC series Desperate Housewives. Nick McHatton of TV Fanatic praised the episode, and said he found particularly hilarious the scene about Leslie and Ben accidentally pocket dialing Ron during their sexual roleplaying. However, McHatton said he did not believe Tom's decision to start an entertainment company had "much of a traction past the first five minutes of next season". Joel Keller of TV Squad felt the major changes the characters undergo at the end of the episode felt "rushed", but admitted they were "natural outcropping of the characters and what we've seen of them this year".

"Li'l Sebastian" was voted the fourth funniest half-hour season finale of 2011 in Entertainment Weekly's second annual TV Season Finale Awards, the winners of which are determined by voters. Ron losing his facial hair was voted the third-funniest individual moment, the death of Li'l Sebastian was voted the fifth best death, and the mystery over who "Tammy No. 1" is, and why "Tammy No. 2" fears her, was voted the fourth-best "Non-Romantic Cliffhanger".
