= The Bubble (Parks and Recreation) =

- Parks and Recreation episode
- Episode no.: Season 3 Episode 15
- Directed by: Matt Sohn
- Written by: Greg Levine; Brian Rowe
- Original air date: May 19, 2011

Guest appearances
- Tami D'Addio as Kim; Dana Gould as Angry Man (uncredited); Jim Jansen as Stuart; Pamela Reed as Marlene Griggs-Knope; Helen Slayton-Hughes as Ethel; Jeff Sloniker as Reggie; Vivian Smallwood as Muriel; Yolanda Snowball as Crying Woman; Sara Van Horn as Woman

Episode chronology
| ← Previous "Road Trip" | Next → "Li'l Sebastian" |
- Parks and Recreation season 3

"The Bubble" is the fifteenth episode of the third season of the American comedy television series Parks and Recreation, and the 45th overall episode of the series. It originally aired on NBC in the United States on May 19, 2011. In the episode, Leslie becomes nervous when her new boyfriend Ben has a business meeting with her tough mother, Marlene. Meanwhile, Chris tries to make some changes in the parks department, much to the chagrin of the staff.

Written by Greg Levine and Brian Rowe and directed by Matt Sohn, "The Bubble" originally aired back-to-back along with "Li'l Sebastian". The two are stand-alone episodes not originally meant to run together, but because the third season premiered late, they had to be shown together so the series' season would conclude by the end of the television season. The episode featured a guest appearance by Pamela Reed as Leslie's mother Marlene, her first appearance since the second season episode "Galentine's Day".

"The Bubble" marked a major progression for the character Tom Haverford, who starts considering if he should leave his city hall position, which sets the stage for him to leave the position in "Li'l Sebastian". "The Bubble" received generally positive reviews and, according to Nielsen Media Research, was seen by an estimated 4.27 million household viewers. Combined with an estimated 3.72 million household viewers with "Li'l Sebastian", the two episodes' ratings were about even with the previous week's episodes, "The Fight" and "Road Trip".

== Plot ==
In a cold open scene, the parks department welcomes Ann to her new office in city hall and fill it with balloons, much to the chagrin of her cranky officemate Stuart. Leslie and Ben are dating, but they are keeping their relationship a secret due to a no-dating policy at work. They are enjoying what Leslie calls "the bubble", or the beginning of a relationship when everything is simple and fun. It is suddenly threatened, however, when Ben has a meeting with Leslie's mother Marlene, a notoriously tough politician in the Pawnee school system, who wants Ben to approve the purchase of four new school buses despite a difficult budget season. Afraid of ruining the bubble, Leslie initially tells Ben she is not related to Marlene. Right before Ben's meeting, however, Leslie admits Marlene is her mother, making him nervous and causing him to capitulate to all of her demands during the meeting. Marlene considers Ben weak, so Leslie becomes determined to prove that he is a tough boss to impress Marlene.

Meanwhile, Chris has enacted numerous changes to the parks department; he promotes Jerry to public relations director, appoints April as everyone's assistant, places Tom on the nightmarish fourth floor with Andy as his temporary assistant, and makes Ron sit in the middle of a circular desk after the removal of his office, to force him to interact with people. Ron believes everything will eventually go back to normal as it has with past city managers that implemented drastic changes. However, Donna is concerned the overly-determined Chris will not do so and demands that Ron talk to him. On the fourth floor, Tom's attempts to charm some of the elderly women into doing his work fails miserably, as they ignore him and all adore Andy.

Leslie trains Ben for his next meeting with her mother. He impresses Marlene so much with his tough negotiation skills that she becomes flirtatious with him. An uncomfortable Ben tells Leslie they should tell her about their relationship, but Leslie does not want to lose the bubble. Fed up, Ben storms into Marlene's office and tells her that he is dating her daughter and asks her to keep it secret. Marlene laughs off the situation and tells Leslie that she approves of Ben. Meanwhile, Ron tells Chris the changes do not play to his staff's strengths because Jerry only does well in the background, Tom only does well if people are all aware of his activities, and April only does well if people leave her alone. Chris takes in Ron's well-reasoned arguments and they cut a deal where Chris will return everything to the way it was after Ron does one more week of interacting with the public. Nevertheless, Tom is frustrated with the experience and begins to contemplate leaving his city hall job to pursue his own entrepreneurial interests.

== Production ==
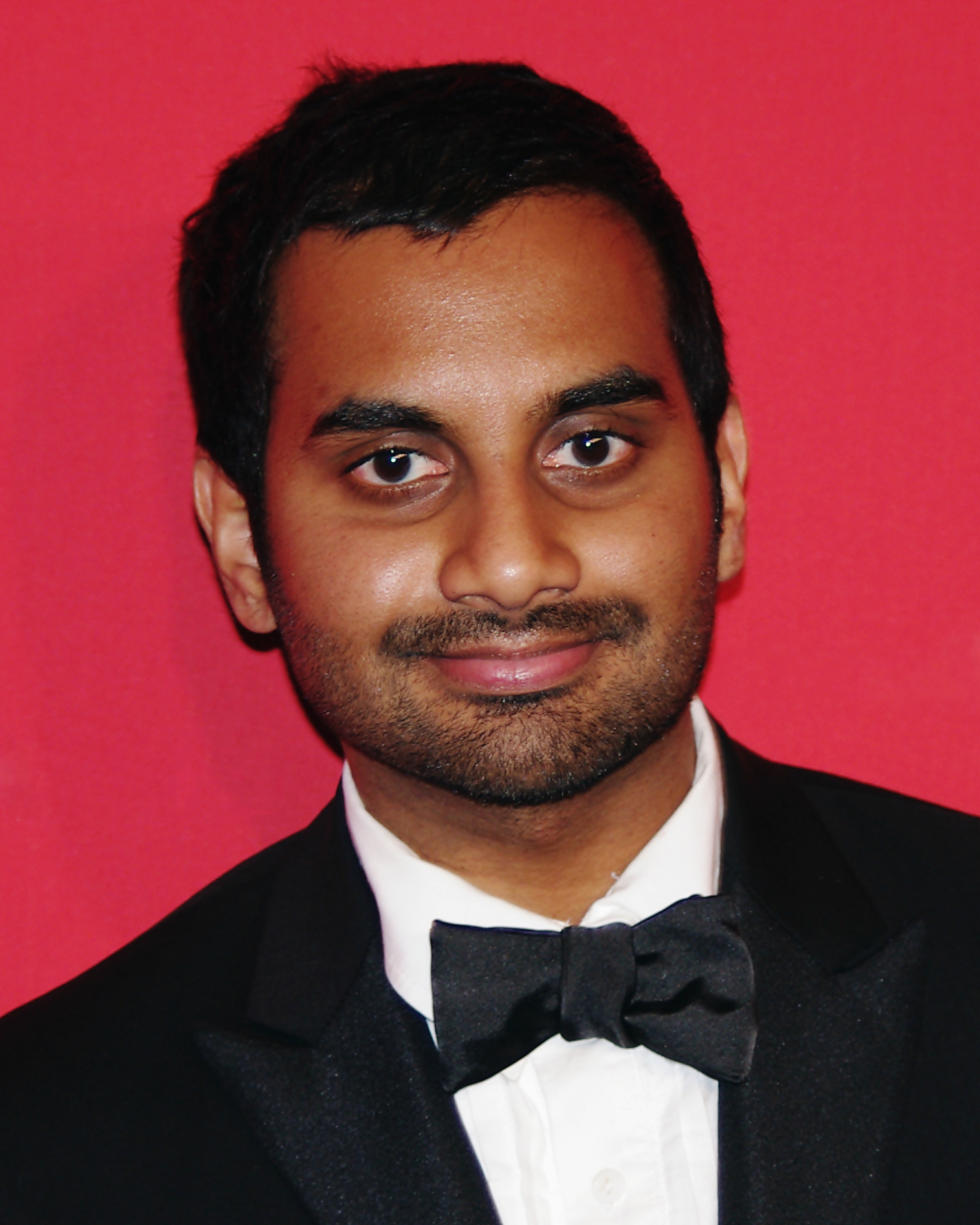
"The Bubble" marked a further progression of the character Tom Haverford (Aziz Ansari, pictured)

"The Bubble" was directed by Matt Sohn and written by Brian Rowe and Greg Levine, the latter of whom regularly works as a writers assistant on the series. The episode was originally broadcast on May 19, 2011, and ran back-to-back with the Parks and Recreation episode "Li'l Sebastian", which aired immediately afterward. The two are stand-alone episodes that were not originally designed to be shown together. However, because the show premiered late as a mid-season replacement in January, the two episodes aired together so the third season could conclude at the end of the television season. The concept of the fourth floor of Pawnee's town hall as a dark and horrifying place was introduced in the second season episode "Tom's Divorce", and has been a running joke with the show ever since.

"The Bubble" featured a guest appearance by Pamela Reed as Leslie's mother Marlene Griggs-Knope, her first appearance on the show since the second season "Galentine's Day". Comedian Dana Gould, who previously worked as a producer on Parks and Recreation, made an uncredited cameo appearance as a man on the fourth floor who enters Tom's fourth floor office looking for a man named Mort, then smashes a coffee pot and says "Tell Mort I said 'Your move.'" "The Bubble" marked a progression of Tom Haverford that had been building throughout the third season, in which the character begins to consider leaving his city hall position to pursue his own business ambitions. That storyline is advanced in "The Bubble" through Tom's frustration with his assignment by Chris, and culminates in the season finale "Li'l Sebastian", in which he ultimately quits the parks department.

== Cultural references ==
Leslie refers to the cable television network History Channel while she describes why she enjoys the early part of romantic relationships: "White wine, cuddling, and crazy amounts of History Channel documentaries." In one scene, Leslie refers to a mixtape for Ben that included five straight songs by singer and songwriter Sarah McLachlan. Leslie prepares Ben for her meeting with Marlene by describing some of her favorite conversation topics, including industrialist Andrew Carnegie and Calvin and Hobbes cartoonist Bill Watterson. Leslie claims her mother loves actor Daniel Craig and Mark Sloan, a character from the medical drama series Grey's Anatomy nicknamed "McSteamy", and she makes a music box with a picture of the latter character in it for Ben to give her as a gift.

== Reception ==
=== Ratings ===
Due to the 9 p.m. broadcast of "Search Committee", the one-hour seventh season finale of comedy series The Office, Parks and Recreation was not shown in its regular 9:30 p.m. broadcast on May 19. "The Bubble" aired at 10 p.m., while "Li'l Sebastian" immediately followed it at 10:30 p.m. In its original American broadcast, "The Bubble" was seen by an estimated 4.27 million household viewers, according to Nielsen Media Research, with a 2.4 rating/6 share among viewers between ages 18 and 49. A rating point represents one percent of the total number of television sets in American households, and a share means the percentage of television sets in use tuned to the program. Viewership for Parks and Recreation progressively dropped for the night, as "Li'l Sebastian" was seen by an estimated 3.72 million households. Combined, the ratings were about even with the average ratings for the previous week, in which two Parks and Recreation episodes were also shown back-to-back, although from a 9:30 p.m. to 10:30 p.m. time block: "The Fight" had been seen by an estimated 4.55 million household viewers, while "Road Trip" was seen by 3.54 million households. In its 10 p.m. timeslot, "The Bubble" was outperformed by the fourth season finale of the ABC medical drama series Private Practice, which was seen by 7.45 million household viewers.

=== Reviews ===
Though NBC packaged the final two episodes of Parks and Recreation as a two-part finale, there's no more continuity between them than any other two consecutive episodes this season – but they are two standout episodes that serve as an ideal capper to a remarkably strong third season of the series.

— Scott Meslow, The Atlantic

"The Bubble" received generally positive reviews. The Atlantic writer Scott Meslow called the episode "a fine example of Parks and Recreation at its funniest" and along with "Li'l Sebastian" served as an "ideal capper to a remarkably strong third season of the series". Meslow added that Ron's intervention on behalf of his co-workers demonstrates he is a "much better manager than he lets on". Henry Hanks of CNN called it a very funny episode and said scenes of Ron swiveling around his circular desk to avoid talking to members of the public were "masterfully executed". Alan Sepinwall of HitFix said he enjoyed Marlene's attempts to seduce Ben, and especially loved the subplot with Chris making changes to the parks department. He praised Nick Offerman's "marvelously minimalist" performance, especially while trying to avoid people in his swivel desk. Matt Fowler of IGN said the episode was hilarious and demonstrated "how marvelously great this series is at creating a truly lovable ensemble". He also praised the subplot with Pamela Reed and the "ridiculous filthiness" of the fourth floor.

Eric Sundermann of Hollywood.com called it a "great little episode" and strong setup for the season finale. Although Sundermann initially had reservations about Leslie and Ben getting together, he now said it felt real because Leslie was willing to risk a job she loved so much to be with him. Paste magazine writer Garrett Martin said although the idea of pairing two co-workers felt like a conventional television move, he did not mind with Leslie and Ben because they are such a "charming and well-matched pair". Martin also said Pamela Reed "absolutely kills it" as Leslie's mother. Rick Porter of Zap2it said Parks and Recreation was at the "top of its game", and that "The Bubble" worked well paired along with the season finale "Li'l Sebastian". He praised the comedic and romantic chemistry between Amy Poehler and Adam Scott, and said the subplot with Chris imposing changes on the parks department was "great fun".

Joel Keller of TV Squad said he enjoyed seeing Ron stand up for the parks department, which proved that despite his hatred of government, he knows his co-workers well and is a good boss. Keller also praised Pamela Reed's performance and said she works well with Amy Poehler. Nick McHatton of TV Fanatic said although he believed the no-dating policy was little more than an unnecessary device meant to create friction between Leslie and Ben, he enjoyed the lengths with which they were going to keep their relationship secret. Steve Heisler of The A.V. Club called "The Bubble" an excellent episode that went a long way in fleshing out the Leslie and Ben romance, but primarily set the scene for the superior "Li'l Sebastian". Time magazine writer James Poniewozik said "The Bubble" was not as funny as some of the better third season episodes like "Harvest Festival" or "Andy and April's Fancy Party", but was nonetheless enjoyable and "perfectly funny".
