= Born & Raised (Parks and Recreation) =

- Parks and Recreation episode
- Episode no.: Season 4 Episode 3
- Directed by: Dean Holland
- Written by: Aisha Muharrar
- Original air date: October 6, 2011

Guest appearances
- Mo Collins as Joan Callamezzo; Pamela Reed as Marlene Griggs-Knope; Dan Castellaneta as Derry Murbles

Episode chronology
← Previous "Ron and Tammys"	Next → "Pawnee Rangers"
- Parks and Recreation season 4

"Born & Raised" is the third episode of the fourth season of the American comedy television series Parks and Recreation, and the 49th overall episode of the series. It originally aired on NBC in the United States on October 6, 2011. In the episode, Leslie Knope (Amy Poehler) promotes a book she has written about Pawnee to advance her campaign, but is sidetracked when Joan Callamezzo (Mo Collins) discovers a factual error in the book that Leslie was unaware of. Meanwhile, Ann Perkins (Rashida Jones) attempts to bond with April Ludgate (Aubrey Plaza) and Ron Swanson (Nick Offerman), while Tom Haverford (Aziz Ansari) and Ben Wyatt (Adam Scott) attempt to charm the recently divorced Callamezzo.

Written by Aisha Muharrar and directed by Dean Holland, the episode marks the return of guest star Mo Collins as well as the continuation of Leslie's campaign for public office. The book featured in this episode, Pawnee: The Greatest Town in America, is available for sale online and in bookstores. The author is listed as "Leslie Knope".

The episode received positive reviews from critics, with praise going to the performance of guest star Mo Collins.

== Plot ==
Leslie has written a book called “Pawnee: The Greatest Town in America” and is preparing to promote it on the local talk show “Pawnee Today”. She hopes that host Joan Callamezzo will select it for her book club, which will guarantee high sales and help Leslie's campaign for city council. Before Leslie goes on the show, however, an anonymous source claims there is an inaccuracy in the book, which Leslie asks the Parks department to find because she knows that Joan will reveal it during the interview as a form of gotcha journalism. Ann is teamed up with Ron and April to fact check the book, and although she is determined to win them over with kindness, they want nothing to do with her.

Leslie goes on “Pawnee Today” where Joan reveals that the inaccuracy is that Leslie was not born in Pawnee as she states in the book, and Joan refuses to put it in her book club. Leslie disputes the claim, but the damage from the interview is done: when Leslie is promoting the book, she is heckled by people who demand to see her birth certificate and it becomes an issue for her campaign for city council. Leslie shows her short-form birth certificate to her campaign advisors William Barnes and Elizabeth, but since it only lists the county that she was born, they say she needs to produce her long-form birth certificate, which is in the hall of records in Eagleton, Pawnee's hated rival town. Andy steals the birth certificate and Leslie is horrified to learn that she was actually born in Eagleton.

Leslie hires Tom to charm Joan into putting the book in her book club, which Tom is confident of doing because he always playfully flirts with Joan. However, he calls everything off when she begins hitting on him for real due to her impending divorce. Joan becomes very drunk during lunch with Tom and Ben, forcing them to carry her home. Meanwhile, after trying and failing to win over Ron and April, Ann finally gets them to open up by telling gross stories about her job at the hospital.

Leslie's mother Marlene admits that Leslie was born in Eagleton, but only because Pawnee's hospital was overrun with raccoons when she went into labor. Still, Leslie is depressed and feels that she is not a true Pawneean. Chris disagrees, telling Leslie that she is the most dedicated resident in town and that where she was born does not matter. Hearing this, Leslie goes back on “Pawnee Today” and reveals the truth, but also proves how much she loves Pawnee by reciting the many people and places in town. Joan allows the book into the book club but also puts a big “Gotcha!” sticker on the back of the book.

== Reception ==
According to Nielsen Media Research, "Born & Raised" was seen by 4.15 million viewers.
