= Road Trip (Parks and Recreation) =

- Parks and Recreation episode
- Episode no.: Season 3 Episode 14
- Directed by: Troy Miller
- Written by: Harris Wittels
- Original air date: May 12, 2011

Guest appearances
- Todd Berger as Kip; Andrew Burlinson as Wyatt "Burly" Burlinson; Jessica St. Clair as Debbie; Kirk Fox as Joe Fantringham; Jay Jackson as Perd Hapley; J. Rene Pena as Julie; Mark Rivers as Drummer; Alyssa Shafer as Lauren; Donna Silverberg as Teacher; John Sloman as Doug; Alan Yang as Bass Player

Episode chronology
← Previous "The Fight"	Next → "The Bubble"
- Parks and Recreation season 3

"Road Trip" is the fourteenth episode of the third season of the American comedy television series Parks and Recreation, and the 44th overall episode of the series. It originally aired on NBC in the United States on May 12, 2011. In the episode, Leslie and Ben are sent on a road trip together and struggle to keep their romantic feelings for each other at bay due to a policy that forbids office romances. Meanwhile, a Newlywed Game-style game show hosted by Tom leads to a fight between Andy and April.

Written by Harris Wittels and directed by Troy Miller, "Road Trip" originally aired back-to-back along with "The Fight". The two are stand-alone episodes not originally meant to run together, but because the third season premiered late, they had to be shown together so the series' season would conclude by the end of the television season. "Road Trip" marked the beginning of a romantic relationship between Leslie and Ben, which culminated a growing development between the two characters that began when Ben was first introduced at the end of the second season.

The episode featured several appearances by recurring guest stars, including Jay Jackson as Perd Hapley, Kirk Fox as Joe and Mark Rivers, Andrew Burlinson and Alan Yang as the members of Andy's band, Mouse Rat. "Road Trip" received generally positive reviews and, according to Nielsen Media Research, was seen by an estimated 3.5 million household viewers, a drop from both "The Fight" and the previous original episode, "Eagleton".

== Plot ==
Leslie still harbors strong romantic feelings for Ben, but cannot date him due to Chris' strict policy against workplace dating. Just as Ann suggests to Leslie that she should avoid being alone with Ben, Chris asks Leslie and Ben to drive to Indianapolis to pitch Pawnee as the next host of the Indiana Little League Baseball tournament. Leslie and Ann devise numerous boring conversation topics for the trip to prevent it from becoming romantic. After an awkward drive to Indianapolis, Leslie and Ben speak before the Little League Commission, which seems reluctant to choose Pawnee for the tournament. Ben delivers a heartfelt speech about the town, but also appears to be secretly speaking about his feelings for Leslie.

The speech clearly impresses both the judges and Leslie, and Pawnee is ultimately selected for the tournament. Leslie reluctantly accepts Ben's invitation to a celebratory dinner that night, where Ben brings up his feelings for her. She slips away to call Ann for advice, and Ann urges Leslie to act on her feelings. Just as Leslie decides to do so, she is surprised to find Chris has arrived at the dinner to congratulate the two personally. He insists they sleep at his home in Indianapolis, ruining their night.

The next day, Leslie and Ben run into each other alone and Ben reveals Chris is out for the day. Ben then immediately kisses her, to which Leslie reciprocates, leaving her simultaneously delighted and nervous about their future.

Meanwhile, Tom asks Andy, April, Jerry and Donna to participate in a new game show called Know Ya Boo, that he is hoping to pitch to networks; he admits that it is a rip-off of The Newlywed Game. It quickly becomes clear that Jerry and Donna know much more about each other than the recently married Andy and April. When April reveals her favorite band is Neutral Milk Hotel and not Andy's band Mouse Rat, Andy angrily leaves the game. Later he and April have a big fight which causes him to quit his music. April seeks advice from Ann because, although she dislikes her, Ann previously dated Andy for several years. Ann tells April she has to be supportive of Andy no matter how she feels. The next day, April brings the other members of Mouse Rat to city hall and surprises Andy by singing one of his songs. A thrilled Andy reconciles with April.

In a separate subplot, a young girl named Lauren asks to interview Ron for her school's field trip assignment to city hall. Ron initially resists, but soon espouses his libertarian beliefs to her. He illustrates the concept of taxes by eating 40% of Lauren's lunch, to compare his actions to those of the government. She eagerly accepts his anti-government views. The next day, Lauren's furious mother reveals her daughter's assignment was "Why Government Matters", and that Lauren simply wrote "It doesn't". Ron apologizes, and later tells Lauren she should keep her views on government to herself until she gets older.

== Production ==
"Road Trip" was written by Harris Wittels and directed by Troy Miller. It was originally broadcast on May 12, 2011, and ran back-to-back with the Parks and Recreation episode "The Fight", which aired immediately before. The two are stand-alone episodes that were not originally designed to be shown together. However, because the show premiered late as a mid-season replacement in January, the two episodes aired together so the third season could conclude at the end of the television season. "Road Trip" marks the first time Ben and Leslie kiss and the beginning of their romantic relationship, which culminated a developing relationship between the two characters that began when Ben was first introduced at the end of the second season.

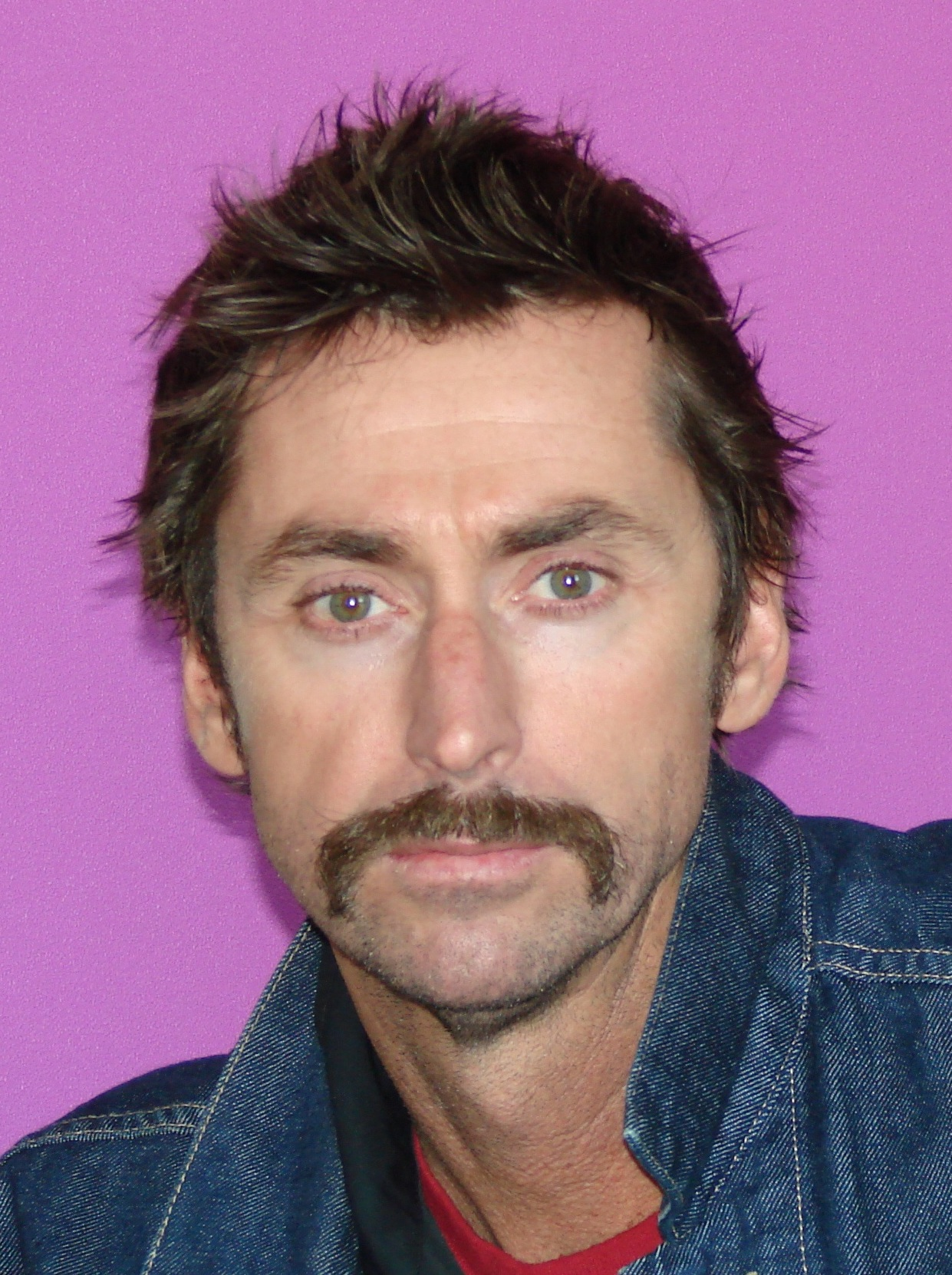
Stand-up comedian Kirk Fox made a guest appearance in "Road Trip".

The episode featured several appearances by actors who had appeared in previous Parks episodes, including Jay Jackson as Pawnee reporter Perd Hapley and stand-up comedian Kirk Fox as sewage department employee Joe. Andy's band Mouse Rat, which has appeared in previous episodes starting with the first season finale "Rock Show", also appeared in "Andy and April's Fancy Party". Mark Rivers played the drums, Andrew Burlinson played guitar and Parks and Recreation screenwriter Alan Yang played bass guitar. In "Road Trip", the band performs "The Pit", a song first featured in "Rock Show", which was about Andy falling into a construction pit and breaking his legs.

== Cultural references ==
April reveals her favorite band is Neutral Milk Hotel after she responds that Jeff Mangum, the band's vocalist and guitarist, is the rock star she was most attracted to. While going through Ann's wardrobe, Leslie finds the outfit Julia Roberts wears in the 1990 romantic comedy Pretty Woman, in which she plays a prostitute; Ann claims to look really good in it. While explaining that everybody steals ideas from other people, Tom points out the 2003 comedy film Love Don't Cost a Thing is based on the 1987 comedy film Can't Buy Me Love. He then falsely claims that film was based on the 1979 drama film Kramer vs. Kramer, which he incorrectly believes was written by the English poet and playwright William Shakespeare. One of the boring conversation topics Leslie brings up to reduce the sexual tension with Ben is the dormitory buildings at Johns Hopkins University, a university in Baltimore, Maryland. Acting against this Ann also "snuck in an Al Green song", "Let's Stay Together".

== Reception ==
=== Ratings ===
While "The Fight" aired in the show's regular 9:30 p.m. timeslot, "Road Trip" immediately followed it at 10 p.m. In its original American broadcast, "Road Trip" was seen by an estimated 3.5 million household viewers, according to Nielsen Media Research, with a 2.4 rating/6 share among viewers between ages 18 and 49. A rating point represents one percent of the total number of television sets in American households, and a share means the percentage of television sets in use tuned to the program. This rating constituted a drop from "The Fight" before it, which was seen by an estimated 4.55 million households. The viewership for both was lower than that of the previous episode, "Eagleton", which was seen by an estimated 5.06 million household viewers. In its 10 p.m. timeslot, "Road Trip" was outperformed by the CBS police procedural drama The Mentalist, which was seen by 14.07 million households, and the ABC medical drama series Private Practice, which was seen by 7.27 million household viewers.

=== Reviews ===
"Road Trip" received generally positive reviews. Alan Sepinwall of HitFix said the episode was a good payoff to the romance between Leslie and Ben all season, a story arc he initially had problems with. Sepinwall also called the Ron Swanson subplot "simply fantastic in both concept and execution". Scott Meslow of The Atlantic called "Road Trip" a very funny episode and strong pay-off to the romance between Leslie and Ben that had been building all season. Joel Keller of TV Squad said the Know Ya Boo story felt simply like an excuse to include Andy and April in the show, but that Ron's subplot with the little girl was "classic Ron Swanson". Eric Sundermann of Hollywood.com said the plot felt "admittedly, a little more sitcom-y than I like" but was very funny and progressed the Leslie and Ben story arc without letting the show "jump the shark".

Zap2it writer Rick Porter said he was glad to see Ben and Leslie come together the way they did, particularly because he feared the no-dating rule would become an "artificial barrier" that dragged out the romance subplot. Porter also praised Rob Lowe's performance, and said it made the character likeable even as he kept Leslie and Ben apart. Steve Heisler of The A.V. Club called it a "stellar" episode that was "loose, silly, rich with details and heart". While he said the episode included good "outrageous comedy", he said the script strives on the more subtle scenes about Leslie and Ben coming together, along with Chris' constant interruptions. Nick McHatton of TV Fanatic was underwhelmed by the Know Ya Boo story, but strongly praised Leslie and Ben's scenes, which he said were both touching and very funny. He particularly praised the scene in which Ben describes his feelings for Leslie through his description to the baseball tournament panel about why he loves Pawnee.

Steve Kandell of New York magazine praised the episode, and said the kiss between Leslie and Ben was emotionally effective. He said Chris' obliviousness to the sexual tension between Leslie and Ben seemed unusual, but wrote, "Maybe this is just another case of a show hitting so many perfect notes that the slightest deviation seems off-key." Matt Fowler of IGN said "Road Trip" was less funny than "The Fight", and that the Know Ya Boo subplot "fizzled a bit". But he called it a "sweet episode" for its developments with Leslie and Ben, and said Ron and Chris were especially funny in their scenes. Entertainment Weekly writer Hillary Busis said "Road Trip" was "pretty great" but less funny than the previous episode, "The Fight". She praised the Ron subplot, but said Tom's game show was "much more predictable and rote".
