= The Fight (Parks and Recreation) =

- Parks and Recreation episode
- Episode no.: Season 3 Episode 13
- Directed by: Randall Einhorn
- Written by: Amy Poehler
- Original air date: May 12, 2011

Guest appearances
- Harvey J. Alperin as Dennis; Micah Beals as Len; Matt Besser as Crazy Ira; Andy Forrest as Kyle; Yvans Jourdain as Councilman Douglass Howser; Nick Kroll as Howard "The Douche" Tuttleman; Andy Milder as Freddy; Ben Schwartz as Jean-Ralphio Saperstein

Episode chronology
← Previous "Eagleton"	Next → "Road Trip"
- Parks and Recreation season 3

"The Fight" is the thirteenth episode of the third season of the American comedy television series Parks and Recreation, and the 43rd overall episode of the series. It originally aired on NBC in the United States on May 12, 2011. In the episode, the parks department employees become very drunk during a bar outing, where Leslie and Ann have their first major fight. Meanwhile, Chris tells Tom he must sell his share in the bar due to a conflict with his government job. According to Nielsen Media Research, "The Fight" was seen by an estimated 4.55 million household viewers, a drop from the previous original episode, "Eagleton".

== Plot ==
Chris has fired Dennis Cooper, the former health department public relations director, who hung posters around city hall to publicly condemn his adulterous wife. Leslie suggests Ann replace him (mainly so they can spend more time together, as Ann has been so busy dating numerous men and Leslie has been busy in her job). Although reluctant to leave her job as a nurse, Ann agrees to attend the job interview. Leslie provides her with an overwhelming amount of reading material to prepare for it.

Meanwhile, Tom encourages the parks department to attend the Snakehole Lounge, a nightclub he partially owns with his friend Jean-Ralphio Saperstein, for the unveiling of his new alcoholic beverage, Snake Juice. Tom also encourages them to spread the word about the drink through word of mouth guerilla marketing. April shows little interest in attending, until Andy suggests they make a game of it by role-playing as different people at the bar. April pretends to be Janet Snakehole, an aristocratic widow with a dark secret, while Andy poses as his frequent alter-ego, FBI agent Burt Macklin.

That night, at the Snakehole Lounge, Leslie is surprised and annoyed to find Ann partying on the dance floor instead of preparing for the job interview. Ann introduces Leslie to her latest boyfriend, local radio host "The Douche". As Leslie and Ann become increasingly drunk from Snake Juice, Leslie insults Ann's current dating lifestyle. This prompts Ann to insult Leslie for moving too slow with Ben, to whom Leslie is attracted. The fight escalates throughout the night, and Leslie ultimately claims she always has to keep Ann motivated or Ann would not go anywhere. Both declare it best that Ann not work with Leslie after all and they storm off.

Meanwhile, the Snake Juice proves delicious and popular with the rest of the parks department employees, all of whom become extremely drunk, with the exception of Donna who is on a juice cleanse. Chris arrives to warn Tom that using government employees to promote his own personal ventures is a breach of ethics. He tells a disappointed Tom that he must sell his shares of the Snakehole Lounge if he wants to keep his job.

The next morning, everyone who drank Snake Juice is extremely hungover except for Ron and Leslie deeply regrets how she treated Ann. Ben visits Ann at her home and asks her to forgive Leslie. Ann, who also regrets the fight, is touched by Ben's gesture and reveals that Leslie likes him. Ann decides to attend the job interview, during which she and Leslie apologize to each other. After a second interview with Chris, Ann is given the job in a part-time basis (which will allow her to continue her work as a nurse).

Tom reluctantly decides to sell his Snakehole Lounge shares. Tom sells his shares the next morning to Jean-Ralphio. Donna tries to comfort Tom, causing him to ask why Chris did not make her sell her shares, to which she replies that Chris does not know that she owns shares, but makes both Tom and Jean-Ralphio promise not to tell. Ron attempts to convince Chris to let him keep the shares, defending Tom's efforts to branch out by claiming the move was not unethical. Chris is not persuaded. Ron comforts Tom by building him a special case to hold a bottle of Snake Juice.

At the same time, April tries to reprise her role of Janet Snakehole and have Andy reprise Burt Macklin, but a hungover Andy refuses to play, claiming that his character is dead from drinking too much Snake Juice. However, after seeing a sad April walk away, Andy creates a new role for himself: Kip Hackman, Burt Macklin's brother, to cheer her up. He then vomits onto Kyle's shoes.

== Production ==
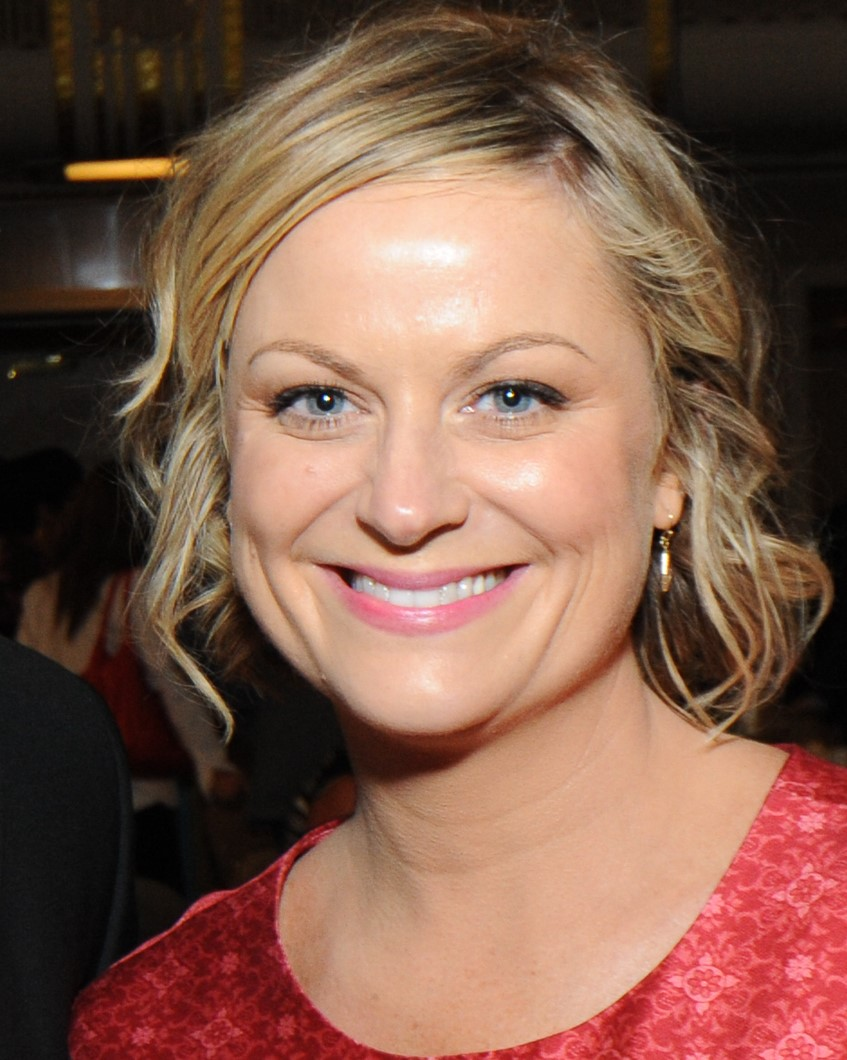
Parks and Recreation star Amy Poehler (pictured) wrote the script for this episode.

"The Fight" was directed by Randall Einhorn and written by Parks and Recreation star Amy Poehler, the second script she penned for the series after "Telethon" in the second season. Filmed in December 2010, "The Fight" was originally broadcast on May 12, 2011, and ran back-to-back with the episode "Road Trip", which aired immediately afterward. The two are stand-alone episodes that were not originally designed to be shown together. However, because the third season premiered late as a mid-season replacement in January, the two episodes aired together so the series' season would conclude at the end of the television season. The filming of "The Fight" involved a particularly large amount of improvisation among the actors, a common technique among Parks and Recreation episodes. Each actor spent about two days on their own filming their Snakehole Lounge scenes, which included the shots used in a montage sequence that showed how drunk each character had become by the end of the night. Poehler described the filming as "the most fun I've ever had".

Although Ann Perkins was initially conceived as a character outside of city hall who became involved with Leslie and her political world, series co-creator Michael Schur said he believed it made sense that she would take a city hall job because "we just decided that Leslie’s pull would be strong enough to get her to make a move, career-wise". Schur also said it would make it easier for the character to become involved in stories with the others. "The Fight" featured several appearances by actors who had appeared in previous Parks and Recreation episodes, including Ben Schwartz as Tom's friend Jean-Ralphio, who helps him promote Snake Juice throughout the night. Andy Forrest appeared as Andy's shoeshine customer Kyle, who is often insulted and mocked by Andy and the other characters during his shoeshines. Nick Kroll also appeared as "The Douche", the host of the Pawnee morning zoo-style radio show "Crazy Ira and The Douche", which was previously featured in the episode "Media Blitz".

During one scene, Ron says, "I won't publicly endorse a product unless I use it exclusively and I really believe in it. My only official recommendations are US Army issued mustache trimmers, Morton's Salt, and the C.R. Lawrence fine two inch style oscillating knife blade." That line was written by Schur, and the scene used in the episode was Nick Offerman's first take, with no mistakes made with the complicated dialogue. Immediately after "The Fight" first aired, a "Producer's Cut" version was made available on the official NBC.com website. It included an additional four minutes of material, that include a previously unaired cold open in which Ron sternly demands to know which employee has broken the parks department's coffee machine; this prompts a fight as the staff make accusations against each other. Ron secretly reveals to the camera that he broke the machine himself, but questioned the other employees anyway to deliberately start the arguments.

== Cultural references ==
The cold open concerns Ron turning the parks department employees against each other; at one point, Ron says to the camera, "I predict ten minutes from now, they'll be at each other's throats with war paint on their faces and a pig head on a stick." The line is a reference to Lord of the Flies.

While providing Ann with reading material to prepare for her job interview, Leslie also gives her a copy of the 2010 Jonathan Franzen novel Freedom, claiming she wants to discuss the protagonist Patty Berglund with her.

While drunk at the Snakehole Lounge, Ben says the words "baba booey" and starts laughing. The phrase is a nickname for Gary Dell'Abate, a radio producer with The Howard Stern Show, and became a common catchphrase among Howard Stern fans.

== Reception ==
=== Ratings ===
In its original American broadcast, "The Fight" was seen by an estimated 4.55 million household viewers, according to Nielsen Media Research, with a 2.4 rating/6 share among viewers between ages 18 and 49. A rating point represents one percent of the total number of television sets in American households, and a share means the percentage of television sets in use tuned to the program. "Road Trip", which aired immediately after "The Fight", was seen by an estimated 3.54 million households. Both ratings constituted a drop over the previous episode, "Eagleton", which was seen by an estimated 5.06 million household viewers. In its 9:30 p.m. timeslot, "The Fight" was outperformed by the CBS forensic crime series CSI: Crime Scene Investigation, which was seen by 11.77 million households; the Fox crime drama series Bones, which was seen by 10.48 million household viewers; and the ABC medical drama series Grey's Anatomy, which was seen by 9.63 million household viewers. Parks and Recreation outperformed an episode of the CW Television Network drama series Nikita, which was seen by 1.94 million households.

=== Reviews ===
"The Fight" was essentially a case of "How silly would the Parks Department gang look if they were almost falling-down drunk?" The verdict? Pretty funny.

— Joel Keller, TV Squad

"The Fight" received generally positive reviews, and several commentators noted that Ann's new part-time job at city hall provides a good explanation for why she is always spending time around the parks department despite working at the hospital. The scenes at the Snakehole Lounge were also praised as particularly funny, especially a shot where Ron Swanson dances drunkenly while wearing April's small woman's hat. Alan Sepinwall of HitFix said the episode was a good character study of the relationship between Leslie and Ann, and that the bar scenes "gave the whole episode a chaotic yet welcoming feel, like it was the show's drunken greatest hits". Entertainment Weekly writer Hillary Busis said she loved the episode and called the Snakehole Lounge scenes a "tour-de-force" that highlighted the comedic skills of the entire cast. Eric Sundermann of Hollywood.com enjoyed the silliness of the episode, and claimed that the characters are so well-developed and likable that watching the Snakehole Lounge scenes felt like hanging out with real-life friends at a bar. Steve Heisler of The A.V. Club called it a "stellar" episode that was "loose, silly, rich with details and heart". He praised the fast pace and comedic timing of the jokes, and wrote, "it felt like the director was having as much fun as possible in 'The Fight.'" Scott Meslow of The Atlantic called "The Fight" a very funny episode which offers a "great solution" to why Ann Perkins spends so much time in city hall, which he called one of the show's "last nagging questions".

Joel Keller of TV Squad said the cast did a good job of playing drunk without being overly exaggerated. He also believed Ann's part-time job was a good way to integrate her into the crew, as she had "seemed adrift this season". Zap2it writer Rick Porter felt the episode was "a little light on plot" but included many funny scenes, particularly Andy and April's role-playing, and Ron's chipper attitude the morning after the bar visit, while everyone else remained hungover. Porter also praised Rashida Jones's performance during her hangover scenes. Matt Fowler of IGN said he enjoyed Tom's efforts to "become a high-roller this season", and said Andy and April were fantastic during their role-playing scenes. Fowler also described Ron's defense of Tom's actions as "heart-warming". He gave the episode a 9 out of 10. Nick McHatton of TV Fanatic said he believed Ann's new part-time job would help better integrate her into the cast. McHatton said the sweet scenes between Leslie and Ben are "quickly becoming my favorite scenes in the series", and said a shot of Ron dancing while drunk at the Snakehole Lounge was "easily one of the funniest things he’s done yet".
