= A Parks and Recreation Special =

Special episode of Parks and Recreation

- Parks and Recreation episode
- Promotional poster
- Episode no.: Episode 126
- Directed by: Morgan Sackett
- Written by: Michael Schur; Megan Amram; Dave King; Joe Mande; Aisha Muharrar; Matt Murray; Jen Statsky
- Original air date: April 30, 2020

Guest appearances
- Megan Mullally as Tammy Two; Paul Rudd as Bobby Newport; Ben Schwartz as Jean-Ralphio Saperstein; Mo Collins as Joan Callamezzo; Jon Glaser as Councilman Jamm; Jay Jackson as Perd Hapley; Jason Mantzoukas as Dennis Feinstein

Episode chronology
← Previous "One Last Ride"	Next → —

"A Parks and Recreation Special" is a special episode of the American comedy television series Parks and Recreation and the 126th episode overall. It was originally broadcast on April 30, 2020, on NBC. It was written by series co-creator Michael Schur with Megan Amram, Dave King, Joe Mande, Aisha Muharrar, Matt Murray, and Jen Statsky, and was directed by Morgan Sackett. Set during the COVID-19 pandemic, the episode shows Leslie Knope and her friends as they handle life during quarantine.

The special served as a fundraiser for Feeding America's COVID-19 Response Fund. While the series had originally ended with no plans for a reboot, Schur decided to create a new episode in response to the pandemic. The show's main cast members, along with several recurring characters, returned for the special. It was produced in three weeks, with all work done remotely and the cast recording their parts individually.

In its original broadcast, the episode was seen by 3.67 million viewers and was the highest-rated program of the night in the 18–49 demographic. It received acclaim from critics, particularly for its heart and comforting nature, and raised at least $3 million for Feeding America.

== Plot ==
Bobby Newport (Paul Rudd) introduces the special from his family fox hunting lodge in Switzerland. He had been unaware of the COVID-19 pandemic and is shocked when the cameraman tells him about it.

Amid the ongoing quarantine, Leslie (Amy Poehler) calls her friends as part of her daily phone tree. Each character offers a glimpse into their day-to-day lives:

- Leslie, a regional director for the National Park Service, is leading several committees she created in response to the quarantine.
- Ben (Adam Scott) decides to make a claymation film based on his board game The Cones of Dunshire, but later comes to his senses and abandons the project.
- Ron (Nick Offerman) is in his cabin and thinks Leslie's daily conversations with him are unnecessary. He later shows that his ex-wife Tammy 2 (Megan Mullally) has snuck up to his cabin; he has tied her up until he can deliver her to the authorities.
- April (Aubrey Plaza) randomly selects five items from a bag to wear each day.
- Andy (Chris Pratt) has accidentally locked himself in his shed.
- Chris (Rob Lowe) regularly donates blood due to his excellent health.
- Ann (Rashida Jones) returned to work as a nurse and isolates herself from Chris and their kids.
- Tom (Aziz Ansari) had a book tour in Bali canceled, so he uses a green screen to show pictures of Bali.
- Donna (Retta) expresses support for teachers after seeing what her husband has been experiencing.
- Garry (Jim O'Heir), whom the others had avoided calling, explains the challenges he has faced as mayor of Pawnee during the pandemic.

Leslie and Ben appear on talk shows with Joan Callamezzo (Mo Collins) and Perd Hapley (Jay Jackson) to discuss the pandemic. Andy appears on Perd's show as Johnny Karate to reassure kids about the ongoing situation. Fictional advertisements show several other characters:

- Dennis Feinstein (Jason Mantzoukas) promotes a cologne that supposedly kills all viruses.
- Jeremy Jamm (Jon Glaser) announces his plan to deliver dental equipment to homes and walk patients through procedures themselves.
- Jean-Ralphio Saperstein (Ben Schwartz) buys a commercial so people can call him because he is lonely.

Leslie tells Ron that she still misses her friends despite her daily calls. To cheer her up, Ron arranges for the others to join a group call, and they sing "5,000 Candles in the Wind" for her. Leslie thanks Ron for the gesture.

== Production ==
In April 2020, during the COVID-19 pandemic, NBC announced they would air a special episode of Parks and Recreation, centered on Leslie trying to stay connected with the other residents of Pawnee during social distancing. The show's cast, including Amy Poehler, Rashida Jones, Aziz Ansari, Nick Offerman, Aubrey Plaza, Chris Pratt, Adam Scott, Rob Lowe, Jim O'Heir, and Retta, returned for the special, which served as a fundraiser for Feeding America's COVID-19 Response Fund. Poehler and series co-creator Michael Schur had agreed against doing a reboot when the series originally ended in 2015, but Schur explained that they thought the pandemic provided a "compelling reason" for the special.

The episode was written by Schur along with former Parks and Recreation writers Megan Amram, Dave King, Joe Mande, Aisha Muharrar, Matt Murray, and Jen Statsky, and was directed by Morgan Sackett. Originally, Universal Television executive Pearlena Igbokwe had reached out to Schur about reuniting the cast for a remote table read of an existing episode. However, after reaching out to the cast and receiving responses from all of them in under an hour, Schur eventually decided it would be more worthwhile to create a new episode. The series finale, "One Last Ride", had already shown events after 2020, so the writers sought to fit everything into the existing continuity. According to Schur, the special is canonical but was not written to reference any events depicted in the show's future. The script for the episode was finished in about three days.

Due to the pandemic isolation, Schur and the other writers created workarounds to explain why the characters were all in separate locations. The exception was Offerman and Megan Mullally; because the two are married in real life, they could appear in scenes together. To avoid trivializing or making light of the pandemic, the writers decided to have none of the characters become infected with COVID-19. They also made Ann an outpatient nurse instead of placing her on the front lines for the same reasons. One of the writers pitched the idea of using fake commercials, which Schur quickly found "perfect" because it allowed guest stars to appear and prevented the episode from feeling like other shows carried out via Zoom calls.

Filming was carried out at the cast's homes over four days using iPhones, microphones, and other equipment shipped to each actor. Sackett designed rigs for filming to ensure the actors could film themselves with proper lighting and the correct frame rate. After making the rigs, Sackett and several other crew members drove around Los Angeles to deliver them to the cast, though Ansari's had to be shipped to him in England. Schur, Sackett, and other crew members then watched over Zoom as the actors each recorded their lines. To sing "5,000 Candles in the Wind", some actors listened to the song through an earpiece in order to keep the correct pace, while others sang it from memory. The visual effects team from the series The Good Place, also created by Schur, provided visual effects on the special to improve its appearance, as the cast did not actually interact together.

Originally, the episode opened with Poehler and Offerman as themselves introducing the fundraiser, but Schur remarked that this opening felt strange. Late in production, the writers changed the opening to have Paul Rudd introduce the episode as Bobby Newport. Because Rudd was on the East Coast, they offered to ship him a rig, but Rudd instead provided his own equipment and completed filming within an hour of receiving the script. In total, production for the episode took about three weeks. Afterward, Schur noted that "this isn't the way TV is supposed to be made" and that it "was a lot of fun and hard work but it's not any kind of model for going forward."

== Reception ==
=== Ratings ===
In its original airing, "A Parks and Recreation Special" was seen by 3.67 million American viewers, roughly on par with the show's final season five years earlier. It also achieved a 1.4 rating in the 18–49 demographic, placing first for the night and giving NBC its best 18–49 rating for a Thursday comedy that season. A Paley Center special about Parks and Recreation aired before the episode; it was seen by 3.38 million viewers with a 1.0 rating among adults 18–49. By the next day, the episode had raised $2.8 million for Feeding America's COVID-19 Response Fund, and the total reached at least $3 million by May 2.

=== Critical response ===
The episode received acclaim from critics. On Rotten Tomatoes, it holds an 100% approval rating based on 26 reviews, with an average rating of 8.7/10. The website's consensus reads, "Against all odds the delightful cast and crew of Parks and Recreation pull off a socially distant reunion that's warm, funny, and very, very special." On Metacritic, the episode holds a score of 89 out of 100 based on 14 reviews.

Dennis Perkins of The A.V. Club gave the episode an A−, writing that it was a needed episode with "warmth, laughs, and hope". The publication followed this with a roundtable of several of their critics reviewing the episode; Patrick Gomez was brought to tears, Erik Adams called it "the right show for right now", and Marah Eakin complimented the episode's heart. Rolling Stone's Alan Sepinwall remarked that the challenges of remote production limited the special's humor, but found the show's "warm hug [...] felt more welcome now". Richard Roeper of the Chicago Sun-Times gave it four out of four, calling the episode "a most wonderful and welcome pop-in visit".

The New York Times's James Poniewozik considered the show well-suited for exploring the dynamic of protecting others by staying away from them. He added that the special didn't "tell us what to think; it helped us feel what we feel". In her review, Judy Berman of Time enjoyed watching the cast and their chemistry. However, she considered the episode "utopian" and "comforting but willfully naive", noting how much America had changed since the series finale in 2015. Vanity Fair's Sonia Saraiya enjoyed revisiting the series's optimism, sweetness, and light comedy but also remarked on how different the current world was from the show's original seasons.

=== Awards ===
For their work on the episode, Brent Findley, Jason Tregoe Newman, Bryant J. Fuhrmann, and Michael Jesmer were nominated for a Golden Reel Award for Outstanding Achievement in Sound Editing – Live Action Under 35:00.
