= Jean-Ralphio Saperstein =

US TV sitcom character, created 2010

- Parks and Recreation character
- Ben Schwartz as Jean-Ralphio Saperstein
- First appearance: "The Set Up" (2010)
- Last appearance: "A Parks and Recreation Special" (2020)
- Portrayed by: Ben Schwartz

In-universe information
- Occupation: Co-creator of Entertainment 720; Salesman at Lady Foot Locker
- Family: Mona-Lisa Saperstein (Jenny Slate) (twin sister); Dr. Lu Saperstein (Henry Winkler) (father)
- Birth date: December 12, 1985

Jean-Ralphio Saperstein is a fictional character played by Ben Schwartz in the American comedy television series Parks and Recreation. He is the cocky friend of Tom Haverford (Aziz Ansari) and, like Tom, sees himself as a pickup artist and "baller", although he is looked upon with contempt by most people around him except Tom. Ron Swanson (Nick Offerman) happily invests in Tom's "Rent-A-Swag" venture when he learns that for once Jean-Ralphio is not involved. He tries to dress stylishly, makes up and raps spontaneous rhymes but usually fails due to adding an extraneous word after the rhyme, and often speaks in slang terms, such as variations of the suffix -izzle as popularized by American rapper Snoop Dogg. For example, while comforting Tom at one point, Jean-Ralphio encourages him to "Turn that frizown upside-dizzity."

At the end of the third season, Tom leaves his city hall job to start an entertainment company with Jean-Ralphio. Their venture quickly falls apart due to extravagant spending, and they both move on to other schemes. Jean-Ralphio's twin sister Mona-Lisa Saperstein (Jenny Slate) and their obstetrician father Dr. Lu Saperstein (Henry Winkler) are also introduced in later seasons.

== Character biography ==
Jean-Ralphio is first introduced in "The Set Up", when Tom brings him in for an interview to be Ron Swanson's new assistant; Jean-Ralphio is quickly rejected. In "Woman of the Year", when Tom is trying to find investors to help him buy a share of the Snakehole Lounge nightclub, Jean-Ralphio contributes $5,000 of the remaining $6,000 Tom needs. Unable to raise the rest, the two approach Donna Meagle (Retta) about investing along with them, but after a sales pitch from Jean-Ralphio, Donna rejects them and tells Tom, in front of Jean-Ralphio, "I hate that guy."

Jean-Ralphio also appeared in "The Master Plan", wherein April Ludgate (Aubrey Plaza) flirted with him at the Snakehole Lounge to make Andy jealous, prompting Andy to say about him, "That Ralph Macchio guy's a total douche." Jean-Ralphio also appears in "The Fight", wherein he helps Tom raise awareness for his new drink, Snakejuice, at the Snakehole Lounge. At one point, after drinking Snakejuice and having a fight with Ann Perkins (Rashida Jones), a drunken Leslie Knope (Amy Poehler) demands to Jean-Ralphio, "Dance up on me." which request he immediately and excitedly fulfills.

In the third-season finale, "Li'l Sebastian", Tom encourages Jean-Ralphio to start a multimedia entertainment company called Entertainment 720. After their first successful job organizing a memorial event for celebrity miniature horse Li'l Sebastian, Tom decides to quit his city hall job to work with Jean-Ralphio and the company, which opens a warehouse-sized modern office with strange decor, completely stark-white walls, and overpaid staff. Within six months, the company blows through its entire $450,000 start-up money, and is quickly defunct.

In the episode "Bailout", Jean-Ralphio's sister Mona-Lisa Saperstein (Jenny Slate) begins working for, then enters into a sexual relationship with, Tom.

In season 6, Jean-Ralphio and Mona-Lisa's father, Dr. Lu Saperstein (Henry Winkler) – an obstetrician who is often lied to by his children – makes an appearance. Under the impression that Tom unfairly drove Jean-Ralphio out of their business and took Mona-Lisa's virginity, Dr. Saperstein opens a competing apparel store across from Tom's store, Rent-a-Swag, in order to drive him out of business. In the series finale "One Last Ride", Jean-Ralphio fakes his and Mona-Lisa's deaths, and tries to get insurance money to build a casino in Tajikistan. The twins are spotted by the funeral-goers and run away in panic. In another flash-forward scene in the same episode, Jean-Ralphio's name is visible on a bottle of champagne being served to Craig Middlebrooks and his husband. Jean-Ralphio also confesses that he has been in love with Leslie for years.

In 2016, Schwartz and show creator Michael Schur jokingly confirmed a fan theory that Jean-Ralphio's real father is Stranger Things character Steve Harrington (Joe Keery), given the similarities between the two characters.

== Development ==
Schwartz originally met with Parks and Recreation co-creator Michael Schur to discuss playing a different role on the show, and Schur liked him so much that the character Jean-Ralphio was created specifically for Schwartz. Schwartz said the character had "just a couple of lines" at first, but was eventually expanded. After making his first few appearances in the second season, Schwartz began to appear less frequently because he was cast in the NBC action spy series Undercovers, but he was able to return more often after it was cancelled. Schwartz was later cast in the Showtime series House of Lies, but Schur said they hoped to have Schwartz back "early and often". Like other cast members, Schwartz improvised a great deal during filming.

== Reception ==
In May 2011, Jean-Ralphio was placed number 7 on SplitSider's "The Ten Funniest Recurring Characters Currently on TV".
