= Andy Dwyer =

US TV sitcom character, created 2009

Andy Dwyer KBE
- Parks and Recreation character
- Chris Pratt as Andy Dwyer KBE
- First appearance: "Pilot" (2009)
- Last appearance: "A Parks and Recreation Special" (2020)
- Portrayed by: Chris Pratt

In-universe information
- Aliases: Burt Macklin, FBI, Count Chocula, Kip Hackman, Andy Radical, Tim Buckanowski, Brother Nature, Johnny Karate, Johnathon Karate, Sgt. Thunderfist, MD, Eagle One, Farts McCool
- Gender: Male
- Occupation: Shoeshinist (shoeshiner), Musician, Assistant, O'possum Tackle, Security Officer, Prime Minister of the Whites, Star of Johnny Karate's Super Awesome Musical Explosion Show
- Spouse: April Ludgate-Dwyer (m. 2011)
- Significant other: Ann Perkins (ex-girlfriend)
- Children: Burt Snakehole Ludgate Karate Dracula Macklin Demon Jack-o-Lantern "Jack" Dwyer (b. 2023); Unnamed Child (b. 2025)

Sir Andrew Maxwell "Andy" Dwyer KBE (/ˈdwaɪ.ər/) is a fictional character in the NBC comedy Parks and Recreation portrayed by Chris Pratt. Originally meant to be a temporary character, Andy was so likable that producers asked Pratt back as a series regular. He appears in the first season as Ann Perkins' (Rashida Jones) unemployed, slacker boyfriend, then takes a job as a shoe-shiner at Pawnee City Hall in the second season. Andy eventually marries April Ludgate (Aubrey Plaza) and is later promoted to Leslie Knope's (Amy Poehler) assistant. Pratt was credited as a guest star for the first season, despite appearing in every episode; he is part of the main cast for every season after season one.

Andy is one of the few starring characters not to appear in every episode, as he was absent for a multi-episode arc in season six while Pratt was filming Guardians of the Galaxy. He also did not appear in the season 2 episode "Practice Date."

== Character overview ==
Pratt summarized Andy Dwyer as "dim-witted and guileless and a real idiot, but lovable." At the start of the series, Andy Dwyer is dating Ann Perkins. Ann matured faster than Andy did; while Ann entered into a career in nursing, Andy was lazy and unmotivated. After being dumped by Ann, Andy begins living in the pit adjacent to Ann's house.

Andy remained unemployed after school but was the lead singer and guitarist for his rock band, which underwent numerous name changes.

Andy later gets work shining shoes at city hall, where he becomes friends with April Ludgate, whom he later marries after one month of dating. Though absentminded and possessing an extremely short attention span, Andy is shown to have a savant-like memory. For instance, he received the highest grade the police academy had ever seen on the written entrance test, has an uncanny ability to remember movies word for word, and is able to memorize a long list of facts for his feminist college class in the episode, "Smallest Park." Andy also had perfect SAT scores, but mentioned it was probably due to broken Scantron machines. Andy's father is deceased, as mentioned in the episode Emergency Response upon being asked a hypothetical question during a personality test about potentially encountering his father. Andy responds, "First, I would be like, ‘Dad, you’re alive? What the hell?'"

Andy also possesses a wild imagination, which helps him become a children's performer named Johnny Karate and then get his own children's television show. Occasionally, Andy goes into character as his alter ego, covert FBI agent Burt Macklin, whenever he and April role play or to solve local mysteries.

Andy is a huge fan of the Indianapolis Colts and was married wearing Reggie Wayne's jersey.

== Storyline ==
=== Season one ===
Before the start of the first season, a drunken Andy fell into a large construction pit and broke both his legs while attempting to retrieve a discarded toaster from the bottom of the pit. Ann is at first unaware that Andy was drunk at the time of the fall, and the incident inspires her to attend Parks and Recreation meetings to advocate for filling in the pit. It is at these meetings that Ann first befriends Parks Deputy Director Leslie Knope.

With both of Andy's legs in casts, Ann pampers him, bringing him food and letting him play video games all day. When the doctors inform Andy that the casts can be removed, he delays their removal for several weeks so he can continue receiving this treatment from Ann. After the casts are removed, Ann discovers the truth and furiously breaks up with Andy.

=== Season two ===
Andy moves into a tent pitched in the pit and watches Ann, claiming to be protecting her. He makes many failed attempts to reconcile with Ann. After Mark Brendanawicz (Paul Schneider) begins dating Ann, Andy grows to hate him, but pretends to like him whenever Ann is around. Andy is injured in the pit a second time when Leslie arranges to have it filled with dirt, unaware that Andy is still in the pit. Andy considers suing the town with the hopes of getting money and winning Ann back, but Leslie convinces him to settle out of court in exchange for having the pit filled in. Leslie gives Andy a job as the shoe-shiner at the Pawnee City Hall as part of his settlement. April Ludgate, the parks department intern, begins to develop a crush on Andy, but he is for a long time unaware of her feelings toward him. As time goes on, Andy begins to develop feelings for April, though he is unsure about dating her due to their age difference and his own unresolved feelings for Ann. Simultaneously, Ann begins to show similar feelings for Andy. At the end of the season, having broken up with Mark, Ann kisses Andy, who does not reciprocate. This later causes him problems with April, who continues to believe he is still in love with Ann.

=== Season three ===
Andy has been unsuccessfully trying to get in touch with April. When she finally returns from Venezuela, she arrives with a new boyfriend, Eduardo (Carlo Mendez). Leslie encourages Andy to not give up. In the episode "Time Capsule", Andy befriends Eduardo at the advice of Chris Traeger (Rob Lowe). As a result, April begins hating her new boyfriend, and he moves back to Venezuela. Andy also becomes the new coach of one of the two youth basketball teams, with Parks Director Ron Swanson (Nick Offerman) serving as the other coach. Andy's coaching style is much lazier than Ron's strict style. He is also briefly Ron's receptionist in "Flu Season". In the episode "Media Blitz", April leads Andy to believe that if he completes the tasks she hates every day for a month, she will consider being with him. In the same episode, it is hinted at that he has a cousin called Clara Dwyer. This, however, was never expanded upon further. Although she begins this as a bluff, after seeing Andy complete even the most humiliating of these tasks happily, she kisses him. In the episode "Andy and April's Fancy Party" Andy reveals that he had proposed to April a day earlier after only one month of dating to which April replied, "Fine." They are married at the end of the episode in a surprise ceremony.

=== Season four ===
At the beginning of season four, Tom Haverford (Aziz Ansari) asks Andy to join his new company. He declines Tom's offer and instead joins Leslie's campaign as her assistant and head of security, a role he enjoys very much. At the end of the season, he is encouraged by April to pursue a career as a police officer as all his "dream jobs," with the exception of rock star, revolve around law enforcement.

=== Season five ===
During the fifth season, Andy continues to pursue his ambition to become a police officer and seeks help from others to better his chances of passing the police academy entrance exams. He asks Chris to help him get fit enough to pass the police physical. His marriage to April is not strained by the distance between them: they exchange care packages and he visits her in Washington, DC.

Andy earns a perfect score on the written portion of the police officers' exam. When he fails the personality portion of the exam, he gets a rousing pep talk from Chris. Ben Wyatt (Adam Scott) then gives Andy a job working with him at the Sweetum's charity foundation.

=== Season six ===
Andy's role is reduced in the sixth season, as Chris Pratt was busy with filming commitments to Guardians of the Galaxy. Andy spends the early part of season 6 in England attending to Sweetum's charity work. Before he went to England, he loses 50 pounds after giving up beer (offered as an in-show explanation for Pratt's weight loss associated with his Guardians of the Galaxy role). He briefly visits Pawnee and does not want to return to England, but April convinces him to go back. Once he returns, he becomes part of a committee in the Parks department in charge of organising a concert to unite the recently merged towns of Pawnee and Eagleton. In the season finale, Andy reunites with MouseRat and sings a memorial song for 'Lil Sebastian, Pawnee's beloved, recently deceased mini-horse, at the Pawnee Unity concert.

=== Season seven ===
Andy remains married to April Ludgate, and the two have become responsible adults, to their horror. He has a TV show on public access, The Johnny Karate Super Awesome Musical Explosion Show, where he is knighted by Lord Edgar Covington (Peter Serafinowicz) in its final episode, and later works part-time at the National Park Service. His friendship with Tom has grown since the previous seasons. After April decides to leave for a new job in Washington, D.C., Andy goes with her.

In a series of flash-forwards in the final episode, April and Andy ask Leslie and Ben for advice regarding the prospect of having children, which Andy very much wants but April does not. They decide to try for it and their son, Burt Snakehole Ludgate Karate Dracula Macklin Demon Jack-o-Lantern "Jack" Dwyer, is born on Halloween 2023. By 2025 the couple is expecting their second child.

== Development and production ==
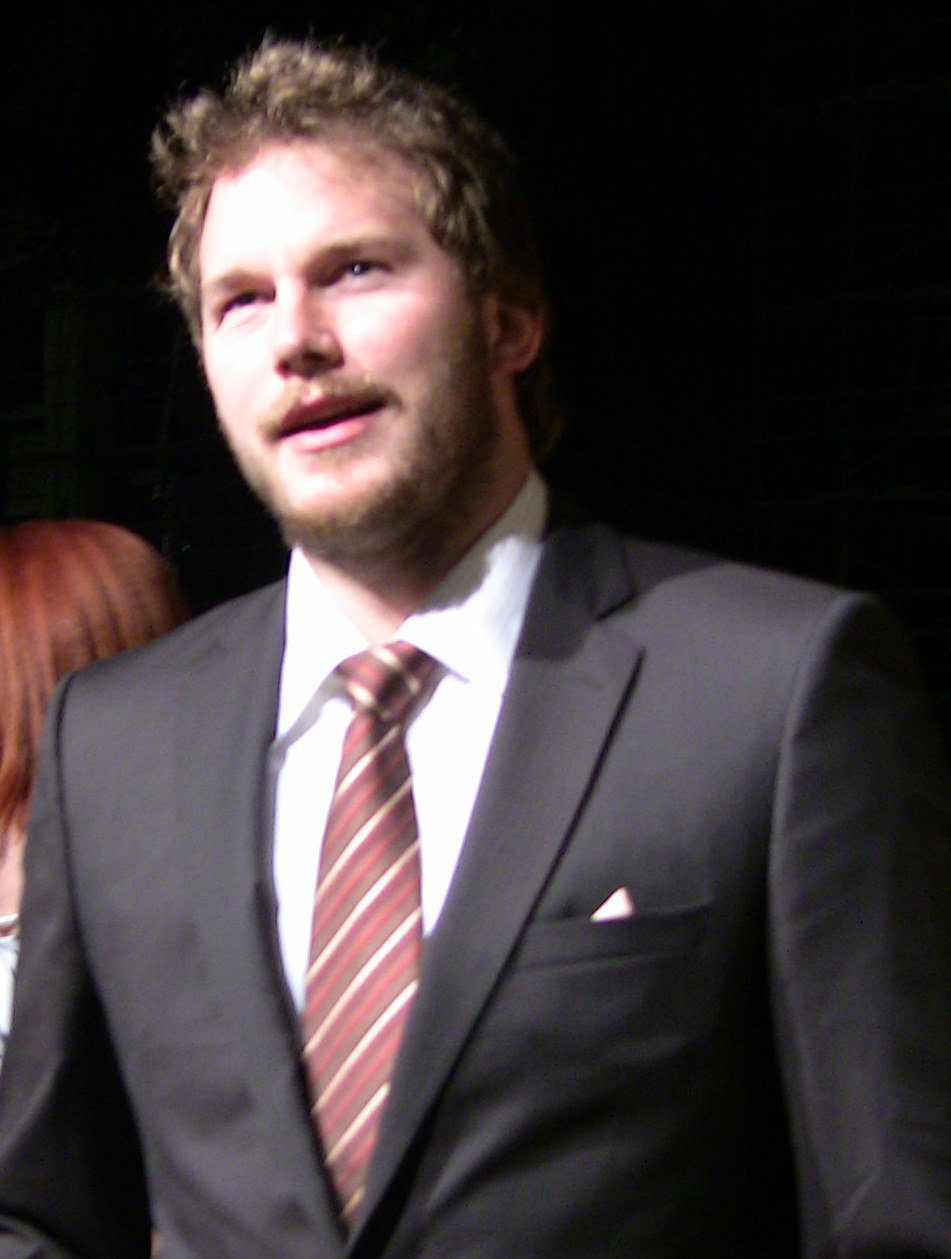
Pratt at the premiere party of Parks and Recreation

Chris Pratt was credited as a guest star throughout the entire first season, but was promoted to the main cast in the second season. The Andy character was originally supposed to appear only in the first season, but the producers liked Pratt so much that almost immediately after casting him, they decided to make Andy a regular character.

As the focus of the series was supposed to be on local city government, the writers came up with ideas to keep Andy's character in the show after his breakup with Ann. He eventually gets a job at City Hall, first as a shoeshiner and then as Leslie Knope's assistant during her campaign, and later Ben Wyatt's assistant at the Newport Foundation. Showrunner Michael Schur said that during the second season, the writers had an idea that "if we stayed with him for a long time he was going to be this real Horatio Alger kind of guy - a guy pulling himself up, like a Charles Dickens character or something. At one time early on in Season 2, we were like, 'The end of the show is Andy is the mayor!' That was what we thought because he was going to shine people's shoes, and everyone was going to love him, and he was going to get to know everyone. That's why we kind of we kept we hung onto that for a long time. We had him be people's assistants, and it was like, 'Oh, he's meeting people,' and everyone who meets him loves him. At one point like in Season 2, Season 3, we were like, 'Andy is going to be the mayor someday,' and he was going to be this real like old-timey 19th century [scenario], like, 'He started as the shoeshine boy!'"

Pratt purposely gained weight for the role during the first season, which he felt was right for the character of Andy Dwyer. "I'm not saying that fat is funny, but misplaced confidence is funny, and Andy is someone who is not fit but walks around like he is. So I went back the next day, and I told Mike Schur I wanted to gain 20 to 30 pounds. He said great." However, the weight gain nearly prevented Pratt from getting film roles, first as baseball player Scott Hatteberg in Moneyball (2011) and then as Star-Lord in Guardians of the Galaxy (2014). After crash dieting for Moneyball, he got into much better shape to play a Navy SEAL in Zero Dark Thirty; but subsequently regained the weight to resume portraying Andy. His weight loss for Guardians of the Galaxy was written into the script, when Andy claims he lost 50 lbs. in one month by giving up beer.

Pratt took a hiatus from the show during the sixth season in order to film Guardians of the Galaxy. The sixth-season opener, "London," partially took place in London in order to accommodate Pratt's filming schedule, as well as explain Andy's absence from Pawnee after he gets a temporary job offer in England.

In the second season, Pratt did a scene with Amy Poehler and Rashida Jones in which Andy shows up at Ann's house totally naked. Pratt wore skin-tone briefs which were supposed to be pixelated for television to imply he was naked. After several takes of Poehler opening the door to see him naked, Pratt felt that Poehler did not seem convincingly surprised, so he took off the briefs. Poehler's reaction was so genuine that this was the take later aired on TV. However, Pratt was formally reprimanded for the prank in a letter from NBC.

Although Pratt became a movie star by the end of the series, he said he never considered leaving the show.
