= Ben Wyatt (Parks and Recreation) =

Parks and Recreation character

Ben Wyatt KBE
- Parks and Recreation character
- Adam Scott as Ben Wyatt
- First appearance: "The Master Plan" (2010)
- Last appearance: "A Parks and Recreation Special" (2020)
- Portrayed by: Adam Scott

In-universe information
- Full name: Benjamin Wyatt
- Nicknames: Beni, Benji, Angelo, Jello-shot, J-shot, Ice Town, Ice Clown, Rubber Band, Eagle Two, Dorkasaurus, Sum-Dance Kid, Falcon, Nerd, Accounting Nerd, Professor Books, Professor Smartbrain, Leslie's House Boy, Sugar Butt, Calzone Boy, The Architect, Human Disaster, Bento Box, The Maverick, The Swiss Army Accountant, Little Mayor, Kid Mayor, The King of Swing
- Occupation: President or First Gentleman of the United States of America (implied); First Gentleman of Indiana; Member of the U.S. House of Representatives from Indiana's 9th District (2020); City Manager of Pawnee, Indiana; Campaign manager; Board game designer; President of the Sweetums Foundation (former); Accountant (former); CFO of Rent-a-Swag (former); Deputy City Manager of Pawnee, Indiana (former); Indiana State Auditor (former); Mayor of Partridge, Minnesota (impeached); CFO of Entertainment 720 (former); Shortstop on his High School JV Baseball team (former)
- Affiliation: Carleton College (BA in Political Science)
- Family: Julia Wyatt (mother); Stephen "Steve" Wyatt (father); Stephanie Wyatt (sister); Henry Wyatt (brother); Unnamed half-sister; Georgia Wyatt (niece)
- Spouse: Leslie Knope (m. 2013)
- Children: Westley Knope-Wyatt (son); Stephen Knope-Wyatt (son); Sonia Knope-Wyatt (daughter)

Sir Benjamin "Ben" Wyatt KBE is a fictional character portrayed by Adam Scott in the NBC comedy series Parks and Recreation. He first appears in the show's second season as a state auditor who comes to Pawnee to evaluate its funds alongside Chris Traeger. Initially portrayed as a serious and pragmatic budget specialist, Ben gradually becomes more sympathetic to the town and develops into an integral member of the community.

Despite initially angering series protagonist Leslie Knope with his budget-cut recommendations, Ben begins dating her in the season 3 episode "Road Trip." Their relationship forms a central storyline in the series; the two get married in the season 5 episode "Leslie and Ben" and have triplets in season 6. In the season finale, it is implied that either he or Leslie eventually becomes the President of the United States; Leslie taking office would make him the First Gentleman.

As a character, Ben is known for his dry wit, affinity for calzones, and creation of the fictional board game "Cones of Dunshire." His role as the humiliated former mayor trying to make a career in government was one of the original concepts for the series, but was abandoned in favor of building the show around Leslie Knope's character. Adam Scott's portrayal of Ben has been positively received by critics, with praise given for Ben's ability to act as both a straight man and a comedic force.

== Character biography ==
Originally from Partridge, Minnesota, Ben was elected mayor of the town at age 18 after leading what he describes as an "anti-establishment voter rebellion." However, his lack of experience led him to run the town's finances into the ground, largely due to the construction of a winter-sports complex he named "Ice Town," which was never completed. He was then impeached after two months in office. His time as mayor bankrupted the town, caused its unemployment rate to hit 30%, and led to the newspaper headline "Ice Town Costs Ice Clown His Town Crown."

Ben attended Carleton College, where he was the host and DJ for a swing-music college radio show called Zoot Suit Wyatt, a reference to the swing revival album Zoot Suit Riot (1997). After becoming an accountant, he and Chris Traeger assumed the nicknames Butch Count-sidy and the Sum-dance Kid, with the names referencing the outlaws Butch Cassidy and the Sundance Kid as well as being accounting puns.

Ben's seriousness and intent to cut spending initially puts him at odds with the Pawnee government, particularly Leslie Knope. Though he warms to the town and becomes a major member of its community, he remains mystified by some of its quirks, such as Pawnee's universal affection for miniature horse Li'l Sebastian.

Ben is known for his "nerdy" interests and references to franchises such as Star Wars, The Lord of the Rings, Star Trek, and Game of Thrones; fellow Pawnee government employee Tom Haverford routinely teases him for this. Ben's love for calzones is a running joke throughout the series, to the point that he envisions a restaurant named "The Low-Cal Calzone Zone." During a period between jobs in season 6, Ben creates a board game called The Cones of Dunshire, which is noted for its extremely complex set of rules. A real board game based on Ben's creation was created by Mayfair Games.

=== Season two ===
When Ben comes to Pawnee, he immediately clashes with Leslie, who is appalled by his unsentimental attitude towards firing people and his penchant for slashing her department's budget. However, when he asks her out for a beer, they begin to show respect for one another. He shares his past as the mayor of Partridge, and that he became a state auditor to prove that he can be responsible and eventually run for office again. Their new friendship turns sour when Ben and Chris reveal that the town is virtually out of funds and the government will have to be shut down until further notice.

Despite the seriousness of the problems, Chris presents the situation in an extremely positive light and tries to make all of the city-hall employees around him happy, leaving the hard decisions and delivery of bad news up to Ben; this makes Chris the good cop and Ben the bad cop in the partnership. Chris and Ben form a budget task force, consisting of several government employees, including Ron. When Ron accidentally reveals that Leslie was trying to set up an annual children's concert on Lot 48 behind Ann's house that was supposed to be canceled, Ben tries to shut it down. However, after seeing the effort Leslie put into it, which included having the equipment donated from local vendors, he pays the entertainer Freddy Spaghetti to come back after he booked another event, getting back on Leslie's good side. Ben is also surprised, but quietly pleased, when Ron authorizes Leslie to take his place on the budget task force.

=== Season three ===
When the government shutdown ends, Ben informs the department that, due to the shoestring budget, they will only be on maintenance for the time being. Ben suspects that Leslie is trying to have Ann convince Chris to distribute more funds to the department, and he confirms his suspicions when he crashes their date at the same time Leslie crashes it, but Ben decides to let it play out. While at a gay club, Ben mentions the failure of the Ice Town project, showing that he used to be just as ambitious as Leslie, but Leslie gives him credit for trying. Ben listens to Leslie's presentation regarding the Pawnee Harvest Festival idea that will allow them to do their jobs properly and bring funds into the department. When Ben asks what will happen if it does not bring in funds, Leslie says they can shut down the department, and Ben allows them to go forth with the festival.

Ben assists Leslie with the festival preparations, and he is thoroughly impressed when she gives a flawless presentation despite being stricken with the flu. When Leslie and Ben try to ask the police force to handle security for the festival, Ben is shown not to have very strong social skills, although in this case it could be attributed to the fact that he does not understand Pawnee as well as Leslie does. He and Leslie continue to build a strong friendship over their development of the Harvest Festival, and it is implied that he has developed an attraction to her when he asks the police chief about her relationship with Dave. He also becomes better friends with Tom, supporting him when he is rejected by a cologne magnate, although Tom does his fair share of ribbing Ben.

While doing the media blitz for the festival, he is continuously asked about his disastrous tenure as mayor of Partridge. After freezing up at the majority of questions asked, he goes on a furious tirade at a later interview, prompting businesses to pull their sponsorships at the festival and putting the parks department in jeopardy. At the last interview at Pawnee Today, Ben finally stands his ground, stating that everyone does stupid things when they were teenagers and that he has since saved at least five cities from bankruptcy as an auditor. During the festival itself, a series of catastrophes leads Ben to feel that he is cursed and leave the festival, returning later to admit that he is not over his past. Leslie assures him that he is as responsible for the festival's success as she is, and she has the local Native American chief Ken Hotate perform a fake ceremony to remove his "curse."

Following the conclusion of the festival, Chris is installed as interim city manager of Pawnee and offers Ben a job as assistant city manager, which he eventually accepts. It is implied that he made the decision to be closer to Leslie and that they are mutually attracted to each other, but a new policy of Chris's forbids city employees to date each other, halting a potential relationship between the two.

Since he is staying in Pawnee permanently, Ben decides to move out of the motel where he has been living. Andy and April offer him a spare room in their house, given that their previous roommate moved out and left the house to them. Although the two have been living by themselves for only a week, the house is a complete mess, with no everyday items like plates or utensils available. Ben decides to teach a reluctant Andy and April how to properly live like adults.

In "Road Trip", Ben and Leslie are sent to Indianapolis to state their case for Pawnee to host the State Little League Championship. They are successful, and they go out for a celebratory dinner. There, Ben tells Leslie that he likes her romantically, and Leslie confirms that she likes him, too, but Chris decides to crash their dinner, preventing them from addressing their feelings. At the end of the episode, Leslie approaches Ben to hand him receipts, and he kisses her.

In "The Bubble", Leslie and Ben are officially dating but are keeping their relationship a secret due to Chris's no-dating policy. They are enjoying what Leslie calls "the bubble", meaning the beginning of a relationship when everything is simple and fun. However, it is suddenly threatened when Ben has a meeting with Leslie's mother, Marlene, who wants Ben to approve the purchase of four new school buses despite a difficult budget season. Afraid of ruining the bubble, Leslie initially tells Ben that she is not related to Marlene. Right before Ben's meeting, however, Leslie admits Marlene is her mother, making him nervous and causing him to capitulate to all of her demands during the meeting, which makes Marlene consider Ben weak. Leslie trains Ben for his next meeting with her mother. He impresses Marlene so much with his tough negotiation skills that she becomes flirtatious with him. An uncomfortable Ben tells Leslie that they should tell Marlene about their relationship, but Leslie does not want to lose the bubble. Fed up, Ben storms into Marlene's office and tells her that he is dating her daughter and asks her to keep it a secret. Marlene laughs off the situation and tells Leslie that she approves of Ben.

In the season finale "Li'l Sebastian", Leslie and Ben continue their romance, but they are struggling to keep it secret. Ron soon finds out and warns them that, if Chris learns about it, he will fire them. As the city prepares for the memorial service for Li'l Sebastian, Pawnee's beloved celebrity miniature horse, Leslie and Ben are caught making out by a maintenance worker, so they send him home in exchange for his silence. Unfortunately, the worker had the propane for Li'l Sebastian's memorial flame, which results in ongoing problems that Leslie and Ben struggle to fix throughout the night. Although the memorial turned out to be a success, things get even more complicated later when Leslie is approached by scouts looking for potential candidates for elected office. They believe that she would be a good candidate for upcoming city-council seats, or possibly the mayoral position. With the expected increased media attention on her personal life, the scouts ask whether Leslie has any secret scandals of which they should know. She denies this, thus omitting her secret relationship with Ben.

=== Season four ===
Though their relationship had become rather serious, Ben and Leslie are forced to break up to avoid a scandal that could derail Leslie's city-council candidacy. Ben understands, giving Leslie a "Knope 2012" button he had made. He then starts helping Tom run his business, Entertainment 720, where he is shocked at how much money Tom spends without getting any revenue. He also helps Tom charm Joan Callamezzo to try to get her book club to include Leslie's new book, but Joan gets drunk and hits on them. He and Leslie end up sharing lovelorn looks with each other. Ben is dragged along to Tom and Donna's "Treat Yo Self", where he treats himself to a Batman costume and a good cry over his breakup with Leslie.

While Leslie attempts to keep him in her life, Ben insists that he needs distance from her because being around Leslie is too difficult for him. Leslie continually tries to spend time with Ben until, through the help of Ben and Ann, she sees that she has been ignoring what Ben wants and doing only what she wants. Ben and Leslie meet at the Smallest Park, which is supposed to be their last project together. Leslie apologizes and tells Ben that she will leave him alone if that is what he wants. Ben responds that he does not want that but that he thinks that it is for the best. As Ben starts to leave, Leslie declares that she misses him like crazy and wants to be with him. After she asks how he feels, Ben kisses Leslie and the relationship is reinstated.

Later, they confess to Chris about their relationship, and he launches an investigation to check for any possible acts of corruption, as Ben is Leslie's superior. It turns out that, in the season-three finale, Ben and Leslie had bribed a maintenance worker to keep quiet about them after the worker witnessed them kissing. As that was a possible reason for termination, Leslie was ready to take full responsibility, only to find that Ben resigned from his job in order to save hers.

Following his termination, Ben takes some time to "explore his interests", which consisted of remaining in his house and attempting various hobbies like making calzones and stop-motion films. His appearance becomes unkempt and, after a visit from Chris, he realizes that, despite convincing himself otherwise, he is unhappy without some sort of direction in his life. After Leslie's campaign flops at the ice rink, Ann resigns (eagerly) from being Leslie's campaign manager and Leslie asks Ben to run her campaign because of his experience with local politics. Ben takes over the duties of running Leslie's campaign for city council and helps turn the campaign around, making it competitive with Bobby Newport's bid for city office. Ben manages to secure the endorsement of Pawnee's retiring police chief and improve Leslie's likability at a bowling event (despite the spectacle of having punched a man who called Leslie 'a bitch'). In "Dave Returns", it is revealed that, not only is Ben socially awkward around police officers, but that he is afraid of them, saying "I am not afraid of cops. I have no reason to be. I never break any laws ever because I'm deathly afraid of cops."

Towards the end of the campaign, Ben is offered a job working for a congressional campaign in Washington, D.C. Initially conflicted, as it would mean several months away from Pawnee, Ben is ultimately convinced by Leslie to take the job.

=== Season five ===
Jonathan Banks and Glenne Headly guest starred as Ben's parents in the fifth season. He successfully runs a congressional campaign during the first five episodes of the season. When Ben returns to Pawnee, he proposes to Leslie, and they move into a house together. Later, Ben turns down multiple job offers in Pawnee to join Tom Haverford's company, Rent-a-Swag; concurrently, he ends up working for Sweetums, at a division dedicated to improving their public image by funding charities. He also takes on Andy as an assistant. Ben and Leslie throw a large event designed to help with fundraising for the Pawnee Commons instead of creating a wedding registry. During the event, Leslie tells Ben how much she hates the feeling of not being married to him. Ben responds by saying that they should just get married that night. After two hours of frantically finishing last-minute details, a ceremony ruined by a drunk Councilman Jamm, and bailing Ron out of jail, they hold the wedding in the Parks Department. In the episode titled "Partridge", Ben is invited to return to Partridge, his hometown, where he was elected and failed as mayor at the age of 18, for a ceremony to give him the key to the city. Ben falls ill with kidney stones and, when Leslie goes to receive the key in his name, it is revealed to be one big joke to mock Ben for his failure as a mayor.

=== Season six ===
After Leslie attacks Sweetums in a press statement, Ben is fired from his job with the company. He then takes on the accountant job that he had accepted and declined three times prior. Shortly later, though, Chris offers him the Job of City Manager of Pawnee because Chris is leaving town; Ben accepts it, becoming the new City Manager of Pawnee and Leslie's boss as she returns to her job in the Parks and Recreation Department. At the end of the episode entitled "Flu Season 2", Ben has a fight with his father, who had sold their family lake house where Ben had many wonderful childhood memories. Ben realizes that he wants to start a family with Leslie, and, when he returns home to tell Leslie, he discovers that she is pregnant with their first child. When visiting Dr. Saperstein, they realize that she is having triplets.

=== Season seven ===
Ben remains city manager and is planning the Pawnee Bicentennial. This, along with greatly improving the economy of Pawnee, gets him the award for Man of the Year. He and Leslie have had their triplets, two boys and one girl, whom they have named Stephen, Westley, and Sonia. During the final episode of The Johnny Karate Super Awesome Musical Explosion Show, Ben is made a Knight of the Order of the British Empire by His Royal Excellence Lord Edgar Darby Covington, 14th Earl of Cornwall-Upon-Thames and 29th Baron of Hertfordshire. After being contacted by Jennifer Barkley, and with Leslie's full support, he decides to run for Congress in 2018. While campaigning, he earns IOW's Woman of the Year award for giving Leslie room to speak her mind instead of reading scripted speeches. Through a series of flash-forwards in the final episode, it is revealed that Ben's congressional campaign was successful and that he is now a representative from Indiana for the House of Representatives. In 2025, he and Leslie are both given the opportunity to run as Governor of Indiana, and Ben ultimately decides to let Leslie run, once again managing her ultimately successful campaign. By 2048, it is implied that at least one of them has been elected President of the United States, with Ben wearing a flag lapel pin and being acknowledged first by someone who appeared to be a member of the Secret Service.

== Development ==
Adam Scott departed from his leading role on the Starz comedy television series Party Down to accept the role of Ben Wyatt on Parks and Recreation. Parks and Recreation was one of Scott's favorite shows even before he took the role. When he accepted a role on Parks and Recreation, it was unclear whether Party Down would be renewed for a third season, and Scott said, "I couldn't pass up the opportunity on Parks and Rec for a show that could possibly not exist anymore." Although Party Down co-creator Rob Thomas said that he believed that the show could continue without Scott, and that the actor would continue to make guest appearances on the show, Party Down was cancelled just three months after Scott departed. Series co-creator Michael Schur said that, when the Ben Wyatt character was conceived, Scott was considered the "dream scenario" casting choice. As part of Scott's contract with the series, he also signed a first-look deal to develop television projects for NBC.

Scott first appeared in Parks and Recreation starting in the penultimate second-season episode, "The Master Plan", the same episode in which Rob Lowe joined the regular cast as Chris Traeger. The idea of a character trying to rebuild a government career following a humiliating public failure was one of the original ideas for the protagonist of Parks and Recreation. The idea was originally abandoned in favor of Leslie Knope's character, but those early ideas were ultimately incorporated into Ben Wyatt. Ben's role as a state auditor, and Pawnee's subsequent budget problems, were conceived from global economic crisis and news reports about government services getting shut down around the country. Scott described his character as "someone who jumped in on a moving train" in trying to integrate with the other characters. Ben was expected to become a love interest for Leslie Knope from his earliest conception. In addition to the growing relationship between Leslie and Ben, one of the biggest story arcs for season three was Ben's growing love of the city of Pawnee, which coincided with his romantic feelings for Leslie. Schur described Ben's character as one who never had a firm sense of home, due to the excessive amount of traveling with his job, but who gradually grew to appreciate Pawnee due to the optimism and enthusiasm that Leslie has for her job.

In 2020, Schur noted that Wyatt's background story of bankrupting his hometown as its mayor with the construction of an ice rink had taken inspiration from the construction of the Curtis D. Menard Memorial Sports Center in Wasilla, Alaska, of which Sarah Palin (the 2008 vice presidential nominee of the Republican Party) had been the key proponent when she was that city's mayor.

== Reception ==
The character received extremely positive reviews from critics and audiences alike.

Alan Sepinwall of HitFix called Scott one of the "rare but special" actors who can be both "the sane and deadpan center of the madness, but can also go convincingly, amusingly mad". New York Daily News writer David Hinckley praised Scott's addition to the Parks and Recreation cast, claiming that he "gets more of a character here than he does on Starz's entertaining Party Down and makes the best of it". Scott received particular praise for his performance in "Media Blitz", in which his awkward and panicked responses to media inquiries about his past led to what reviewers considered more outwardly comedic opportunities for the character, compared to his usual straight-man role. Several reviewers mentioned that Ben Wyatt closely resembled Scott's character on Party Down, Henry Pollard. Ben's character is a politician who found great success at a young age, then suffered a downfall. Henry's character is an actor who became a caterer after his acting career declined. Scott himself has said that he feels that they are "vastly different characters and circumstances."
