= Ann Perkins =

US TV sitcom character, created 2009

- Parks and Recreation character
- Rashida Jones as Ann Perkins
- First appearance: "Pilot" (2009)
- Last appearance: "A Parks and Recreation Special" (2020)
- Portrayed by: Rashida Jones

In-universe information
- Nickname: Been-there done-that
- Spouse: Chris Traeger (husband)
- Significant others: Andy Dwyer (ex-boyfriend); Mark Brendanawicz (ex-boyfriend); Tom Haverford (ex-boyfriend)
- Children: Oliver Perkins-Traeger (son); Leslie Perkins-Traeger (daughter)

Ann Meredith Perkins, portrayed by Rashida Jones, is a fictional character in the NBC comedy Parks and Recreation. She is a nurse and Leslie Knope's best friend.

Ann is originally from Ann Arbor, Michigan, moving to Pawnee sometime before the start of the series. Her ethnic background is a mystery and is often speculated about. After meeting Leslie Knope, the two quickly become best friends. Ann often serves as an inspiration to Leslie, whose many unique compliments specific to Ann, such as “beautiful opalescent tree shark” (One Last Ride) are a running gag in the show. Ann is often portrayed as the straight man, grounded and logical, opposed to the eccentric Leslie. Ann spends most of the series trying to discover herself. Ann is often uncertain and anxious, but still pushes herself, even when she is uncomfortable.

== Storyline ==
=== Season 1 ===
At the start of the series, Ann Perkins is living with her boyfriend Andy Dwyer (Chris Pratt). Ann is far more mature and responsible than Andy, who remains lazy, spoiled, and unemployed. After Andy falls into a large pit next to her house and breaks his legs, Ann is inspired to attend Parks and Recreation meetings to advocate for filling in the pit, which leads Ann to befriend the department's deputy director Leslie Knope (Amy Poehler). Eventually, after Andy's leg casts are removed, Ann learns he could have taken them off weeks prior, but did not because he enjoyed being pampered and spoiled by Ann. This leads to an angry confrontation, and eventually the two break up, much to Andy's despair.

=== Season 2 ===
After Andy, Pawnee city planner Mark Brendanawicz (Paul Schneider) fell into the construction pit (at the end of season one) and is nursed by Ann during his time at the hospital. The two develop a romantic interest in each other and start dating only after Leslie, who previously harbored feelings for Mark, assures Ann she is fine with the pairing. At first, Ann seems to be happy with Mark, but as time goes on, she starts getting bored having a normal and healthy relationship, remembering that her relationship with Andy, while terrible, was more interesting. Furthermore, she shows a hint of jealousy toward Andy's budding relationship with Parks Department intern April Ludgate (Aubrey Plaza). However, she continues to date Mark, unsure of what her true feelings are for him. Yet, when Mark attempts to propose to her, she realises that she has fallen out of love with him, and that she really wants to be with Andy. She and Mark break up, and Mark leaves his government job to work in the private sector. In the season finale episode, after Andy crashes his motorcycle, Ann kisses him while nursing him at the hospital. On another night, she gets drunk and kisses state auditor Chris Traeger (Rob Lowe), which prompts him to continually ask her out on a date, which she declines because she is put off by his relentless positivity.

=== Season 3 ===
Chris continues to ask Ann out, but she repeatedly turns him down. Leslie sees an opportunity to utilize Chris' positivity to bring more funds into the Parks Department by having Ann bring it up on a date. While out, Ann learns of the reason for Chris' positivity: he was born with a rare blood disorder and was expected to die as a baby, and so he is happy to still be alive many years later; as a result, she takes a genuine liking to him. Their date is ruined when both Leslie and state auditor Ben Wyatt (Adam Scott) crash it, and Leslie accidentally reveals the motive behind the date. Ann later apologizes to Chris and asks him out on another date, and the two soon enter into a relationship.

Initially, Ann is intimidated by Chris' intensity, calling him "the perfect human man". But after he is incapacitated by a serious flu virus and so drops his appearance of perfection, Ann relaxes. After a few weeks of dating, Ann is infatuated enough with Chris to have no issues with the idea of leaving Pawnee and following him to Indianapolis. When the two discuss the issue of a long-distance relationship or the notion of Ann's moving with him, Ann believes that things are a bit cleared up although she came up with no definite solution on the issue. Ann later tells Leslie Chris became distant after their "talk", which prompts Leslie to search his house for items that could suggest his infidelity, when she and Ron visit his house in Indianapolis. There, she finds a pink razor and pink swim cap, and calls Ann about it. Ann then storms into Chris' house, accusing him of cheating on her, only to find out that he had actually broken up with her in their conversation the week before; Ann did not realize he had dumped her, because Chris was so cheerful about it. (The razor and swim cap both actually belonged to Chris.)

Ann is emotionally affected by the break up, and she begins engaging in impulsive behaviors, such as dyeing part of her hair red and making out with a patient during the Harvest Festival. When Chris returns to Pawnee as the temporary city manager, the two of them discuss their relationship over dinner, where Ann is fooled again by his positive attitude into thinking their relationship is back on. In order to cope, she decides to start dating again, which causes her to be more distant from Leslie. Leslie, in response, recommends her as the new Health Department public relations director. Ann ends up taking the job part-time so she can still be a nurse at the hospital.

=== Season 4 ===
In season four, Ann moves on from Chris after they shoot a PSA. Ann gets closer to Ron and April after she tells them a disgusting medical story. This results from several failed attempts to engage in small talk, over fact-checking Leslie's book. Ann is again a big supporter in Leslie and Ben getting back together. She also agrees to help Leslie with her campaign and temporarily became her campaign manager. In "Operation Ann", Leslie tries to help Ann meet a date. She ends up going out with Tom Haverford (Aziz Ansari), even though almost everything he does annoys her and they frequently break up. On election night, a drunken Ann agrees to move in with Tom.

=== Season 5 ===
In season five, Ann and Tom have moved in together. Despite realizing, within two days, that it was a mistake, they stay together to thwart their co-workers' expectations that it wouldn't last, and so Tom won't lose his $1,000 bet with Donna Meagle (Retta). They publicly break up when Donna tells them she knows the truth and lets Tom off the hook.

Ann decides she wants to have a child and begins the process of in vitro fertilization, asking Chris to father her child. Chris accepts her offer in the episode "Bailout". Ann and April's friendship expands this season, culminating in a hug and an admission on April's part that she considers Ann a friend.

=== Season 6 ===
In the season six premiere, Ann reveals that she is back together with Chris, and she is pregnant.

In the episode "New Beginnings", Chris and Ann briefly get engaged but decide that they don't need to be married since they're both happy with their relationship. They also learn they are having a boy.

Chris and Ann decide to move to Ann Arbor, Michigan, as Chris is offered a job at the University of Michigan coupled with their desire to be closer to Ann's family, who reside in Michigan. Upon hearing the news, Leslie decides to throw Ann a goodbye party and start groundbreaking on "Pawnee Commons", the lot that was a pit at the start of the series, which Leslie vowed to turn into a park. On Ann and Chris' final day in Pawnee, Ann tells Leslie she will always be her best friend and invites her to come and visit, then she and Chris leave Pawnee until moving back in the final episode of season 7.

On "Galentine's Day", Ann hangs up on Leslie from their scheduled phone call. Leslie later finds out that Ann did this because she was in labor and didn't want Leslie to drop everything to come see her because she could be in labor for hours. Ann is later visited by Leslie at the hospital, and she is seen holding her newborn son Oliver Perkins-Traeger. Chris is not featured in the episode because he was asked to be the birthing coach for another patient, since he did such a great job with Ann.

=== Season 7 ===
Ann and Chris, now married, return for a guest appearance in the series finale in order to advise Leslie in 2025. It is revealed that after Oliver, the couple had a second child, a daughter named Leslie.

== Development ==
While in early stages of developing Parks and Recreation, Greg Daniels and Michael Schur had been considering ideas for a possible show involving Rashida Jones before the concept of the series was even established. Both Daniels and Schur had worked with Jones on the Daniels-created NBC comedy series, The Office, in which Jones played the character Karen Filippelli. It was only after Amy Poehler was cast as protagonist Leslie Knope that the concept of the show and Ann's character were fully developed. While most of the Parks and Recreation character work for the local Pawnee government, Ann Perkins was initially conceived as a political outsider who became indirectly involved in municipal government and, in Schur's words, "got drawn into Leslie's world".

Ann Perkins appeared in every episode of Parks and Recreation until Season 6, except for "Woman of the Year", which she missed because she was filming scenes for the David Fincher film The Social Network (2010). Her last name was inspired by Nancy Perkins, one of the casting directors who worked on the show. In crafting the Ann Perkins character, the staff were drawn to the idea of building a show around a female relationship, namely Ann and Leslie Knope's.

== Reception ==
God bless you, Rashida Jones's agent, you know how to draw up an ironclad contract. Jones herself is never a chore to watch; far from it, and it can only be assumed she's equally charming to work with. [But] the Parks and Recreation writers are the smartest in the business, and even they seem at a loss as to what to do with Ann Perkins.

— Steve Kandell, New York magazine

While most reviewers have praised Rashida Jones' performance, the character of Ann Perkins initially received mixed reviews from critics. Ann often serves as a straight man to the other characters, particularly Leslie Knope, and some reviewers have said Rashida Jones' talent has been under-utilized in the role. Steve Heisler of The A.V. Club wrote, "While I like Rashida Jones in the part, her character usually does best when she's got some wacky person to play off of." Entertainment Weekly writer Hillary Busis said, "Even Parks and Rec lovers often agree that Rashida Jones’s character can seem, well, kind of boring." Matt Fowler of IGN wrote, "Ann isn't necessarily the funniest character on the show, to say the least", but he said she is capable of being very humorous, adding: "Rashida Jones is sexy and funny, but a lot of her humor is subtle and thankless." New York magazine writer Steve Kandell said he did not believe the Ann character was necessary for the show because she was too far removed from the other characters. He added, "The Parks and Recreation writers are the smartest in the business, and even they seem at a loss as to what to do with Ann Perkins." However, Los Angeles Times reporter Robert Lloyd said he felt Jones and Amy Poehler had a good comedic rhythm with each other, and The Atlantic writer Scott Meslow said Jones has a "natural comic sensibility" who rarely gets the best material due to her straight man role. Television columnist Alan Sepinwall said Jones not only plays a good straight man, but particularly excels in bringing the best comedic potential out of her fellow cast members. The character was listed in Wetpaint's "10 Hottest TV Nurses".

Many reviewers were critical of the pairing of Mark and Ann, feeling the couple lacked chemistry and were often the least funny parts of the individual episodes. Entertainment Weekly writer Margaret Lyons called Mark and Ann the show's "Achilles' heel", and Sandra Gonzalez, also from Entertainment Weekly, wrote, "No matter what they do with these two, I can’t help but be bored." Alan Sepinwall said the relationship was ineffective because both Mark and Ann are "straight man" characters, and he called the pairing one of the few mistakes of the second season. In his review of "94 Meetings", in which Mark discusses his intentions to marry Ann, Leonard Pierce of The A.V. Club wrote of the couple, "their scenes just seemed to lay there and die: action was set up but never resolved, and the deferral contained no laughs to compensate for the dramatic fizzle". Matt Fowler of IGN called the pairing one of the "lesser elements" of the second season, but said it had more to do with Mark than Ann: "Mark just wound up feeling extraneous, [but] I can also appreciate the nuanced realism of Ann just realizing that she wasn't ultimately that 'into him' as a way to break them up."

Ann would receive much more positive reviews in the later seasons. Many reviewers claimed Ann's relationship with Chris in the third season was a major improvement, with several writing that Chris' near-perfection took the normally composed Ann out of her comfort zone, giving Rashida Jones more comedic material to work with. Several commentators felt Ann's character in general saw major improvements during the third season, such as in subplots where she started acting eccentrically after her break-up with Chris, or her phase of dating several random men. Steve Heisler of The A.V. Club wrote that by the middle of the third season, "Ann's character defies all the expectations heaped on her from two previous seasons". Eric Sundermann of Hollywood.com wrote: "Rashida Jones hasn't been given too much opportunity to shine within the ensemble, so pushing her off the deep-end seems to be a good decision. Jones is a really funny actress if given the right material, and it's quickly becoming apparent that the 'crazy, almost slutty' approach is one that works in a comedic way for her very, very well." Matt Fowler of IGN wrote, "While Ann still isn't the best of the bunch as far as characters go, she was able to be a part of more great scenes this year by getting paired up with Chris in the first half of the season and getting to have some great moments of drunken anger in 'The Fight'." Several reviews also praised the pairing of Ann and Donna Meagle, who gives her dating advice in the episode "Harvest Festival" and "April and Andy's Fancy Party".
