= Tom Haverford =

Fictional character on Parks and Recreation

- Parks and Recreation character
- Aziz Ansari as Tom Haverford
- First appearance: "Pilot" (2009)
- Last appearance: "A Parks and Recreation Special" (2020)
- Portrayed by: Aziz Ansari

In-universe information
- Gender: Male
- Occupation: Author; Entrepreneur; Owner of Tom's Bistro (former); Parks and Recreation Administrator (former); Owner of Rent-A-Swag (former); Co-owner of Entertainment 720 (former); Author of Failure: an American Success Story (current)
- Spouses: Lucy Santo Domingo (fiancée); Wendy Haverford (divorced)
- Significant others: Mona-Lisa Saperstein (ex-girlfriend); Nadia Statsky (ex-girlfriend); Ann Perkins (ex-girlfriend)
- Nationality: American

Thomas Montgomery "Tom" Haverford (born Darwish Sabir Ismail Ghani) is a fictional character on the NBC series Parks and Recreation. He is a sarcastic, underachieving government official for the city of Pawnee who—in his own mind—is revered for his high levels of confidence and unmatched entrepreneurial skills.

== Background ==
Thomas Montgomery "Tom" Haverford is an Indian American, who changed his name from Darwish Sabir Ismael Ghani to be more appealing in politics. He is often assumed to be an immigrant by much of the Parks and Recreation staff (Leslie often assuming him to be Libyan), though, as he frequently reminds them, he hails from South Carolina, as does Ansari. He initially shared an office with Leslie Knope and worked as her immediate subordinate at the Pawnee parks and recreation department, often serving as her right-hand man.

Tom displays an extremely sarcastic, mischievous and cocky attitude, and frequently attempts to secure favors from local contractors. Tom has demonstrated his talent and passion for entrepreneurship in many occasions, including Entertainment 720, Rent-A-Swag, and Tom's Bistro.

He takes his appearance very seriously, often donning office-casual polo shirts, as well as fitted suits with boat shoes. He also buys clothing from the boys' collection at Brooks Brothers ("Telethon"). In "Go Big or Go Home," Tom also boasted about ladies' sneakers he bought from his workplace during Pawnee's government shutdown. Though it is not explicitly said, it's assumed Tom worked at Lady Foot Locker, where his best friend Jean-Ralphio Saperstein has a job too ("Woman of the Year"). He later opens up his own luxurious clothing-rental store for growing teens, Rent-A-Swag, and employs Jean-Ralphio's sister Mona-Lisa Saperstein. Tom married his Canadian-born college friend Wendy to secure her U.S. citizenship (a green card marriage). Despite the marriage, Tom aggressively flirts with other women, which has prompted confusion from people unfamiliar with his arrangement with Wendy. He is constantly pursuing women even during his marriage, as far as going to strip clubs, hitting on Ann Perkins, distributing copies of his house keys to beautiful women, and judging at the Miss Pawnee pageant.

Tom has complete authority over the Pawnee tennis court reservation system, which has brought him into close contact with many attractive female tennis enthusiasts. Tom's heroes include Tiger Woods, Vin Diesel, Michael Bolton, Flo Rida, Patrick Jane, Paul Walker, and Jamie Foxx. He has a very high image of himself and brags that people view him as a "Brown Superman with a Beard" and has also asked to be introduced as "The Brown Gosling". He is very appreciative of pop culture and the idea of 'swag', very often expressed in his vernacular (e.g. saying "'Serts" instead of "desserts" in the episode "Soulmates"). Tom often teams with April Ludgate and sometimes Donna Meagle to prank and harass Jerry Gergich. He also finds Ben Wyatt an easy target of tease.

== Storyline ==
=== Season one ===
Tom appears lackadaisical about his work at the parks department and regularly undermines Leslie. He plays online Scrabble against his superior, Ron Swanson, during work time and loses on purpose in order to further his career. Ron, who believes in as little government interference as possible, approvingly states of Tom, "He doesn't do a lot of work around here. He shows zero initiative. He's not a team player. He never wants to go that extra mile. Tom is exactly what I'm looking for in a government employee." Tom is often chosen to go on field projects with Leslie. He is also known for abusing his small amount of public power for self-benefit. Tom studies the culture of pickup artists and engages in a practice he calls "peacocking," which involves finding a visual element that makes him stand out in public like a peacock. In one such date, he wears a woman's orange hat, which others find ridiculous.

=== Season two ===
Ron discovers Tom's green card marriage with Wendy, but agrees to keep it secret, especially after Tom discovers Ron secretly moonlights as a nightclub jazz musician. Tom and Wendy get a divorce shortly after she gets her citizenship. Although he initially appears fine, Tom realizes he did in fact harbor feelings for Wendy and regrets the parting. At the end of Season 2, Tom meets Lucy, a bartender at the Snake Hole Lounge. As of the finale, the two are dating.

=== Season three ===
At the beginning of Season 3, Tom is seen working at an apparel store as a sales associate while the government is on furlough. Lucy eventually breaks up with him, and reveals that their relationship ended because Tom spent too much time talking about his ex-wife's relationship with Ron Swanson. As an attempt to exact revenge on Ron, Tom brings Ron's ex-wife Tammy as a date to an event organized by the Parks department. The night ends in chaos with Ron and Tammy being arrested and getting married. It is later revealed in the episode "Indianapolis" that Tom has created his own cologne scent called "Tommy Fresh". In the season finale, Tom quits his job at the Parks Department to work at Entertainment 720 with Jean-Ralphio.

=== Season four ===
Tom begins working at Entertainment 720 and offers the shoeshinist at city hall, Andy Dwyer, a job, which Andy turns down. Entertainment 720 goes bankrupt due to their massive overspending and no business model and Tom decides to throw one last party which Lucy attends at which he confesses to her that he is broke and jobless. Ron tries to persuade Tom to take his old job back, departing from Tom's early storyline by saying he does his job well and keeps the bosses off Ron's back, but doesn't overachieve to the point where the Parks department is tasked to do extra assignments. Tom initially refuses but eventually agrees. After his joking style made Ann Perkins smile at a Valentine's Day party, she decides to meet him for a date which his antics immediately made her regret. However, after several fits and starts, Tom has convinced Ann to keep seeing him, even though he's oblivious to (or ignoring) her disgust at allowing herself to do so.

=== Season five ===
Sometime between the end of season four and the start of season five, Tom and Ann break up. Tom finally begins what appears to be a reputable business, based on an idea he came up with during a fundraiser for Jerry in "Halloween Surprise". The idea, aptly titled "Rent-a-Swag" is to rent his own high-end clothing to middle school boys whose mothers don't want to constantly buy them new articles of clothing through puberty that they will grow out of quickly. He hires Mona-Lisa Saperstein and subsequently starts dating her. While building this business, Tom finally learns how to responsibly make use of his money.

=== Season six ===
Tom learns that Jean-Ralphio's dad, Dr. Saperstein, is his business competitor, and struggles to keep Rent-a-Swag afloat, before finally giving in and selling Rent-a-Swag. He tries to focus on his job, helping Leslie get fluoride added to the water in Pawnee, and helping to set up the unity concert. While assisting Nadia Stasky, a beautiful and humorous doctor, at the Parks and Recreation office, Tom attempts to woo her and she later agrees to go out with him. The two pursue a relationship, and before leaving on a business trip to Rwanda, Nadia agrees to call him when she returns. During a meeting, Tom meets a man who likes his ideas and helps him jump-start his idea for a restaurant, Tom's Bistro.

=== Season seven ===
Now in 2017, Tom's Bistro has become very successful. After reuniting with his ex-girlfriend Lucy, he convinces her to move from Chicago to Pawnee and work at the Bistro. Shortly thereafter, they begin dating and he eventually proposes to her, which she accepts. In a series of flash-forwards in the finale, it is shown that Tom loses a great amount of money after unsuccessfully attempting to franchise Tom's Bistro. However, he later becomes a success again by writing a book about his many failures and how others may be able to achieve success.

== Critical reception ==
Aziz Ansari, who was particularly acclaimed during the first season for his role as Tom Haverford, received similar praise in the second season as well. Alan Sepinwall, television columnist with The Star-Ledger, described Tom as the funniest of the characters during the first season, and Jonah Weiner of Slate.com, who was critical of the first season, said Tom was "the brightest spot." Paste ranked him No. 10 in their list of the 20 Best Characters of 2011.
