= The Reporter (Parks and Recreation) =

- Parks and Recreation episode
- Episode no.: Season 1 Episode 3
- Directed by: Jeffrey Blitz
- Written by: Daniel J. Goor
- Original air date: April 23, 2009

Guest appearances
- Alison Becker as Shauna Malwae-Tweep; Jim O'Heir as Jerry Gergich; Chris Pratt as Andy Dwyer; Retta as Donna Meagle; Steve Zissis as Michael

Episode chronology
← Previous "Canvassing"	Next → "Boys' Club"
- Parks and Recreation season 1

"The Reporter" is the third episode of the first season of the American comedy television series Parks and Recreation. It originally aired on NBC in the United States on April 23, 2009. The episode was written by Daniel J. Goor and directed by Jeffrey Blitz. In the episode, Leslie enlists a local reporter to write an article about the park, but the interviews go poorly, and the problem escalates after Mark gets romantically involved with the journalist.

The episode featured actress and comedian Alison Becker in a guest appearance as Pawnee Journal reporter Shauna Malwae-Tweep. "The Reporter" received generally mixed reviews, with some commentators still comparing it unfavorably to The Office, another comedy series created by the Parks and Recreations co-creators.

According to Nielsen Media Research, it was watched by 5.23 million households in its original airing, continuing a downward trend in ratings since the pilot episode. "The Reporter" and the rest of the first season of Parks and Recreation was released on DVD in the United States on September 8, 2009.

== Plot ==
Leslie announces she has invited a reporter from the local Pawnee Journal newspaper to write a story about the construction pit that she plans to turn into a park. Leslie meticulously prepares for the interview, instructing the members of her subcommittee to "stay on message." Over lunch with Mark Brendanawicz, Leslie seeks advice on how to deal with the press. Leslie once again tells the documentary crew like she did in the pilot that she previously had sex with Mark and seems to still harbor feelings for him. The reporter, Shauna Malwae-Tweep arrives the next day to interview Leslie, along with Ann and Andy. During the interview, Andy reveals he was drunk when he fell in the pit, much to the horror of Leslie and Ann, who were not previously aware of it.

Leslie calls Mark for assistance in dealing with the reporter and Mark, seemingly attracted to Shauna, ends up leaving the parks department office with her. The next morning, Leslie waits at the pit for an interview with Shauna. Leslie is surprised when Mark drops Shauna off at the site and, when she sees Shauna is wearing the same dress as the previous day, she realizes Mark and Shauna have had sex. Leslie is standoffish and irritable during the interview, and she later confronts Mark, who says that it is a private matter and tells Leslie she is acting like a "huge dork." When Leslie says she cannot have this type of behavior from members of her subcommittee, Mark resigns from the committee. Leslie asks for another interview with Shauna, attributing her behavior during their last interview due to food poisoning from a burrito. During the interview, Shauna reads a number of quotes claiming the park will never be built, and that the existence of unicorns, leprechauns and talking monkeys are more likely. Leslie is disappointed to learn that Mark was quoted as saying "this park is never, ever, ever, ever going to happen".

Later, Ann tells Mark about the upcoming story and the negative quote, which Mark thought was off the record. The two confront Shauna and ask her not to use the quotes. Shauna says that she will not use the quotes since the two are "romantically involved," but when Mark disputes the idea that they are romantically involved, Shauna appears visibly annoyed. Later, Mark apologizes to Leslie and asks to be reinstated to the committee, to which Leslie happily agrees. Later, Leslie reads the story, which is not entirely positive, but her enthusiasm remains strong. In a B story, Tom deliberately loses at online Scrabble against his boss Ron, and is horrified when he finds intern April sitting at his desk playing several high point words against Ron. Tom insists to Ron that he is the "Scrabble king." Ron later reveals he knows Tom loses on purpose, but doesn't mind because Tom is his idea of a model government employee: unproductive, lacking initiative and a poor team player.

== Production ==
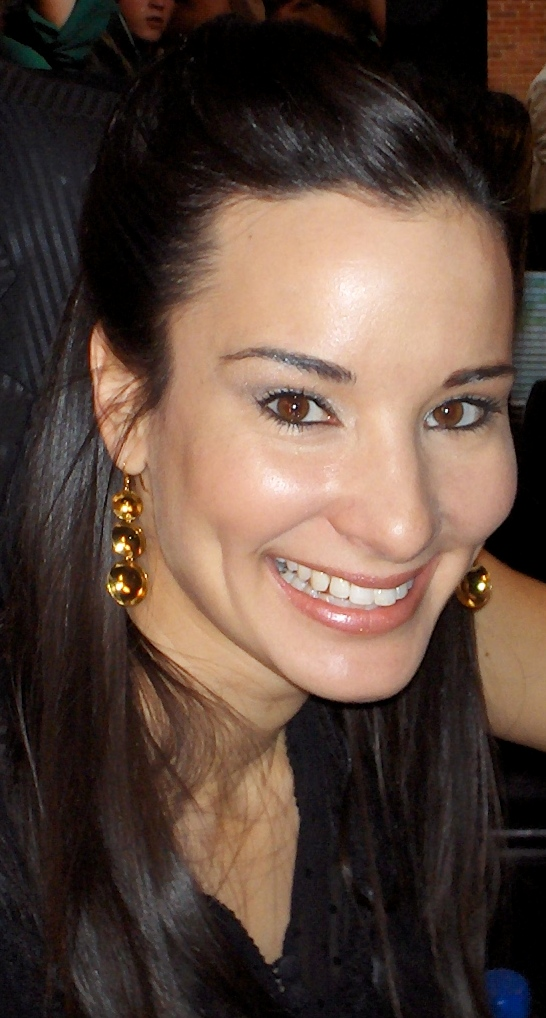
Alison Becker first appears in this episode as one of recurring characters, a Pawnee Journal reporter Shauna Malwae-Tweep.

"The Reporter" was written by Daniel J. Goor and directed by Jeffrey Blitz. Blitz previously directed episodes of The Office, a comedy series created by Parks and Recreation co-creator Greg Daniels. Michael Schur, who created Parks along with Daniels, said of Blitz, "He's such a great director, and it made us feel, launching this new show, safe and happy to have him." It was originally supposed to be the second episode shown in the series, but the broadcast schedule was changed and "Canvassing," the original third episode, was shown second instead. Goor was very upset with the switch so, as a prank, the Parks and Recreation producers sent him an e-mail message claiming NBC was going to be further held until the second season because it was preempted by "a sports thing."

The episode was filmed only two weeks after filming wrapped on the pilot episode, which Schur said he regretted because, "Normally, you'd like to have the usual three months or so to sit back, look at what you made, draw conclusions, tinker, and rewrite." During "The Reporter," Parks and Recreation editor Dean Holland developed an editing technique that would be used throughout the rest of the series. During the scene in which Leslie reacts to quotes read to her by the reporter, Amy Poehler improvised a number of jokes, many of which were not going to be used. Holland thought they were all funny, so he created a brief montage inter-cutting several of the lines into the same scene.

Like most episodes of Parks and Recreation, many of the scenes in "The Reporter" were improvised by the actors. For example, Chris Pratt changed the original line about Mark, "He's thinking with his wiener instead of his brain," to "He's thinking with the head of his wiener, instead of the head of his brain." Aziz Ansari also improvised the line about Mark, "That dude has stuck it in some crazy chicks." Schur was surprised NBC censors allowed either of the lines to stay in the episode. The clip of Leslie trying to confront a raccoon loose in the city hall building was originally filmed for a Parks and Recreation commercial, but was later included into this episode. The scene was filmed to establish a running gag that Pawnee has a terrible raccoon infestation problem. The J.J.'s Diner eatery featured in the episode was named after Goor's wife. Poehler speedily eats tremendous amounts of whipped cream on her waffles. This was inspired by Parks and Recreation story editor Rachel Axler, who producer Morgan Sackett said is "a tiny, bird-like woman" who eats enormous amounts of whipped cream.

"The Reporter" featured actress and comedian Alison Becker in a guest appearance as Pawnee Journal reporter Shauna Malwae-Tweep. Leslie calls the local Pawnee Journal newspaper "our town's Washington Post," one of the largest circulation newspapers in the country. A PDF copy of the Pawnee Journal newspaper page from the episode was posted on NBC's official Parks and Recreation website about Pawnee, Indiana; it included an article written by Shauna Malwae-Tweep with a photo of Leslie in front of the pit, and references to portions of the article mentioned by Leslie in the episode.

== Reception ==
In its original American broadcast on April 23, 2009, "The Reporter" was watched by 5.23 million households, according to Nielsen Media Research, continuing a downward trend in ratings since the pilot episode. "The Reporter" received a 2.4 rating/8 share among viewers aged between 18 and 34, and a 2.3 rating/7 share among viewers between 18 and 49.

The episode received mixed reviews. The London Free Press listed it as one of the "best bets" to watch the evening it originally aired. Alan Sepinwall of The Star-Ledger said the small-town government setting and story lines of the show were working, but felt the writing for the Leslie character has been uneven and that individual situations involving her in "The Reporter" were not funny or effective. Matt Fowler of IGN said the Leslie character was funny, particularly when she talks about her failure to remove graffiti penises from a city wall. ("To this day, I am haunted by those remaining penises.") Fowler also said the Scrabble subplot between Tom and Ron was "silly," and that the Ron character was too one-note and unfunny.

Scott Tobias of The A.V. Club said the faux-documentary style of the show, and Leslie's naive faith about her project and department in this episode, draw unflattering comparisons to The Office, which was also made by the Park and Recreation creators. Tobias said the Scrabble subplot brought "the few good laughs" in the episode. Jason Hughes of TV Squad said he was having trouble connecting to the Leslie character, but felt "The Reporter" allowed for further development of supporting characters like Ron, Tom and Mark, who is portrayed as self-absorbed and "a bit of a douche." Brigid Brown of Cinema Blend said he believes Rashida Jones is being underutilized by the show.

== Home media ==
"The Reporter," along with the five other first season episodes of Parks and Recreation, was released on a one-disc DVD set in the United States on September 8, 2009. The DVD included cast and crew commentary tracks for each episode, as well as about 30 minutes of deleted scenes. The deleted scenes included on the DVD were originally featured on the official Parks and Recreation website after the episode aired. They included clips of Ann voicing excitement about the pit committee, Leslie asking everyone to "stay on message" with the reporter, and Mark expressing shock about Shauna Malwae-Tweep quoting him.
