= Canvassing (Parks and Recreation) =

- Parks and Recreation episode
- Episode no.: Season 1 Episode 2
- Directed by: Seth Gordon
- Written by: Rachel Axler
- Production code: 103
- Original air date: April 16, 2009

Guest appearances
- Eric Edelstein as Lawrence; John Ingle as Man with Dog; Jim O'Heir as Jerry Gergich; Lennon Parham as Kate Speevak; Chris Pratt as Andy Dwyer; Pamela Reed as Marlene Griggs-Knope; Phil Reeves as Paul Iaresco; Retta as Donna Meagle

Episode chronology
← Previous "Pilot"	Next → "The Reporter"
- Parks and Recreation season 1

"Canvassing" is the second episode of the first season of the American comedy television series Parks and Recreation. It originally aired on NBC in the United States on April 16, 2009. The episode was written by Rachel Axler and directed by Seth Gordon. In the episode, deputy director of Parks and Recreation Leslie and her staff canvass the neighborhood to seek support for an upcoming town meeting on their park proposal but end up drawing more critics than allies.

The episode was originally supposed to be the third episode of the series, but the broadcast order was changed and "Canvassing" was switched with "The Reporter". The episode received generally mixed reviews. According to Nielsen Media Research, "Canvassing" was watched by 5.92 million households in its original airing, which media outlets said was commendable, although it was about 900,000 less households than the pilot episode received the previous week. "Canvassing" and the rest of the first season of Parks and Recreation was released on DVD in the United States on September 8, 2009.

== Plot ==
The episode begins with Leslie Knope, deputy director of the Department of Parks and Recreation for Pawnee, Indiana explaining to a documentary crew about the Annual Easter Egg Hunt, in which her colleague, Tom Haverford, has hidden the eggs, and Leslie notes that nobody is able to find them. Tom secretly confesses to the documentary crew that he forgot to plant the eggs.

Leslie plans for an upcoming town hall meeting about her proposal to turn a construction pit into a park. She invites her mother Marlene Griggs-Knope, an official with the county school system, but she does not appear supportive and tells Leslie she may be too busy to attend. Leslie holds a subcommittee meeting with Tom, interested citizen Ann Perkins, intern April Ludgate and city planner Mark Brendanawicz. Mark warns her it might be too early for a meeting with the public, who could opt to vote the proposal down if they are unhappy with it. Leslie remains confident about the meeting and says the group will be doing neighborhood canvassing to try to win support.

The canvassing is largely unsuccessful. Most of the supporters of the park say they will not be able to attend the meeting. Mark, April and Tom speak with one seemingly interested resident, who is implied to be a pedophile. Leslie becomes frustrated with the lack of success and attempts to push poll the community residents. She suggests phrasing the question, "Wouldn't you rather have a park than a storage facility for nuclear waste?" Tom leaves the canvassing group to call prospective contractors about the park project, hinting at accepting bribes and making corrupt deals. Several residents express a lack of support for the park. Resident Kate Speevak vows to attend the public meeting and voice her disapproval after a frustrated Leslie says, "You don't care about your kids if you don't support this park". The canvassing ends with an angry Leslie finding Mark and April playing Rock Band with Ann's boyfriend, Andy Dwyer at Ann's house.

Leslie tries to get her boss Ron Swanson to postpone the town hall meeting, but Ron says he cannot because the town manager Paul Iaresco has "fast-tracked" the project. As the meeting begins, Leslie notices her mother has attended after all, along with many of the people critical of the project. Led by Kate Speevak, the crowd says they do not support the proposal and are angry an environmental study has not been conducted. Leslie tries to pretend April is a supportive resident, but one of the audience members recognizes her from the canvassing.

When Ron tells Leslie to try to place a positive spin on the meeting and prevent a vote from occurring, Leslie attempts to filibuster the meeting. Kate pushes for a vote, but Leslie says she will not hold one until she has heard from each audience member individually. They criticize and yell at Leslie until 9 p.m., when she announces time is up and ends the meeting. Marlene, who privately described the meeting as a "train-wreck", nevertheless expresses her pride for Leslie with a smile. Although frustrated with the meeting itself, Leslie says she is happy to have hosted her first subcommittee meeting. When one resident, Lawrence says, "Hey park lady, you suck", Leslie says with pride, "Hear that? He called me 'park lady'".

== Production ==
=== Conception and filming ===
"Canvassing" was written by Rachel Axler and directed by Seth Gordon, whom the cast and crew of Parks and Recreation admired for his documentary, The King of Kong: A Fistful of Quarters. It was originally supposed to be the third episode shown in the series, but the broadcast schedule was changed and it was switched with "The Reporter", the original second episode. Series co-creator Michael Schur said the plot for "Canvassing" was conceived early in the Parks and Recreation brainstorming process because the staff wanted to demonstrate Leslie's optimism and strong resolve in the face of harsh public criticism. Schur said he felt like Leslie "hangs in and ends up like Rocky: beaten and bloodied, but on her feet". Schur said during his research about municipal government, he received a lot of feedback that community meetings are seldom attended except by those opposed to a proposal, and those in favor of it or neutral about it tend not to attend. This was the inspiration behind the public forum at the end of "Canvassing", which was attended almost entirely by opponents of Leslie's proposed park. Alan Yang, a Parks and Recreation writer, conceived the idea of Leslie using a filibuster at her own public meeting.

Like most episodes of Parks and Recreation, a great deal of the scenes in "Canvassing" were improvised by the actors. The scenes with Tom hinting at bribes and corrupt deals with developers was largely improvised by actor Aziz Ansari. The producers were concerned the subplot would make Tom too unlikeable, but instead audiences responded positively because they felt it was an accurate portrayal of some aspects of small-town government. Ansari also improvised the lines in which he brown-nosed to the developers as they entered the public forum. In one talking head-style documentary interview, Leslie insists a park like the one she envisioned for Pawnee could not be built in communist Russia, and she goes on to impersonate Russian children playing in a park. The scene was completely improvised by Poehler during multiple takes, and Michael Schur called it "my favorite talking head that Amy has done". The cold open of the episode features Leslie wearing bunny ears and helping children on an Easter egg hunt at a park. Since Tom forgot to hide any eggs, Leslie and the children assume it is an extremely difficult egg hunt. The cold open was the last scene shot for "Canvassing", and was conceived at the last moment because the production date was near Easter, and series co-creator Michael Schur said he "thought it would be funny to put Amy (Poehler) in bunny ears". Since it was shot after the majority of the episode, Seth Gordon was not available to direct it.

All outdoor canvassing scenes were shot in a neighborhood of Los Angeles, California, outside the Parks and Recreation studio. Michael Schur said they wanted to establish the type of groundwork public servants often had to conduct in a small town. Seth Gordon sought to make the canvassing scenes as realistic as possible, so he allowed a large amount of improvisation among the actors. The Pawnee residents who are vocally opposed to parks were based on real-life California residents the Parks and Recreation producers encountered who opposed the construction of parks in their hometown. One such group, "The Committee for a Better Park", was actually a group of residents opposed to parks in general, and the deceptiveness of their name and mission inspired the Parks producers while writing "Canvassing".

=== Casting ===
"Canvassing" marked the first appearance of Marlene Griggs-Knope, Leslie's mother and an important public figure in the Pawnee school system. Marlene was played by Pamela Reed, who would continue to make several guest appearances as the character. During the casting auditions, Seth Gordon interviewed Reed as if she were playing the character and Reed improvised a great deal, creating many personality elements that were eventually incorporated into Marlene Knope's character. Gordon said, "Pamela was especially sort of nimble on her feet at inventing a character in the room on the fly, and I thought that was really impressive." During the audition, Reed was asked whether she was proud of her daughter, and Reed replied, "I want my daughter to be successful, which is why I always tell her, there's nothing wrong with being a wife and mother." The improvised line, which was based on something her father-in-law said to her, so impressed the producers that they incorporated it into the episode. Schur said the producers sought to establish Leslie's mother early in the series, and he felt her relationship to Leslie was the center of the entire "Canvassing" episode. Schur said of Leslie's attempts to impress her mom at her public forum, "We imagined it in the writer's room that she is eight years old and doing a piano recital, and she's nervous because her mom's there."

Lennon Parham, an actress and comedian who worked with Amy Poehler on the Upright Citizens Brigade sketch comedy troupe, made a guest appearance in "Canvassing" as Kate Speevak. Michael Schur said early on in the brainstorming process, the Parks and Recreation producers decided to establish an antagonist for Leslie named Kate Speevak, simply because they thought the name was funny. Seth Gordon said Poehler and Parham worked especially well together during their largely improvised scenes, which he attributed to their past work together on the Upright Citizens Brigade. The resident who appeared to be a sex offender during the canvassing was played by Brian Huskey, who Schur called a "fantastic improviser". Eric Edelstein portrayed Lawrence, a resident who antagonizes Leslie and Andy during the public meeting. Edelstein was not originally the actor assigned the "Hey parks lady, you suck" line, but the Parks and Recreation producers like Edelstein so much they gave it to him. Leslie's response line, "Hear that? He called me park lady", was improvised by Poehler.

== Cultural references ==
During office hours, Leslie catches Mark, April and Andy playing Rock Band, a popular music video game in which the players perform rock music using guitar, drum and microphone controllers; during the game, Andy sings the song "My Own Worst Enemy" by Lit. Seth Gordon said the Parks and Recreation producers almost opted not to include a singing part due to concerns about the legalities of using the song, but they ultimately decided to use it. During Leslie's filibuster at the town hall meeting, she begins reading The Phantom Tollbooth, a children's adventure novel written by Norton Juster. The final scene of the episode, with Tom discussing how much he enjoyed The Phantom Tollbooth, was a last minute addition when the Parks and Recreation producers realized they had six possible seconds left to add to the episode.

During the canvassing, Leslie says she may resort to the tactics of Karl Rove, advisor to former President George W. Bush, in phrasing her questions to guarantee positive responses. Leslie refers to Andy as "a cute FDR", a reference to former President Franklin D. Roosevelt. Leslie says her mother is as respected as charity worker Mother Teresa, as powerful as Soviet Union dictator Joseph Stalin and as beautiful as British politician Margaret Thatcher. A PDF copy of the town hall meeting flyer was posted on NBC's official Parks and Recreation website about Pawnee, Indiana; it included before-and-after pictures of the proposed park.

== Reception ==
In its original American broadcast on April 16, 2009, "Canvassing" was watched by 5.92 million households, according to Nielsen Media Research, earning a 2.5 rating/7 share among viewers aged between 18 and 49, and a 2.5 rating/8 share among viewers between 18 and 34. Although the episode attracted about 900,000 fewer household viewers than the pilot episode the previous week, media outlets said the rating was still commendable; "Canvassing" aired following an episode of My Name Is Earl which had a series-low rating among viewers aged between 18 and 49, whereas the pilot episode aired between two episodes of the popular series, The Office. Additionally, "Canvassing" was viewed by almost one million more households than Samantha Who?, which ran in the same 8:30 to 9 p.m. timeslot as Parks and Recreation. "Canvassing" also captured a full 18 to 49 ratings point more than Samantha Who?.

The episode received generally mixed reviews. Alan Sepinwall of The Star-Ledger said he thought the episode was an improvement over the pilot episode, which he also enjoyed. Sepinwall said the episode seemed to distance the Leslie character from Michael Scott, Steve Carell's character on The Office, and gave more for the supporting cast to do; he particularly praised Schneider and Ansari. Matt Fowler of IGN said Amy Poehler "remains frighteningly unflappable" and said he enjoyed how disastrous the town hall meeting turned out to be, but said supporting characters like Mark and Ron "need to be fleshed out a bit more and made... well, funnier." Josh McAuliffe of The Times-Tribune said "Canvassing" was funnier than the pilot episode, but still lacked big laughs and "I think the writers can do some interesting things with the whole playground plot, among them introducing us to some of Pawnee's more colorful denizens."

Keith Phipps of The A.V. Club said although he liked the pilot episode, he thought jokes in "Canvassing" were "pretty thin on the ground", the supporting cast lacked good material and the Leslie character was less likable than the previous week. Phipps, who gave the episode a C grade, said, "This wasn’t a terrible half-hour of comedy by any stretch. It drifted by easily enough. But I’m already having to scour my notes to remind myself of the stuff that was funny." "Canvassing" was first broadcast in Australia on Channel Seven on December 8, 2009, and received a positive review from The Sydney Morning Herald writer Mark Ellis. He particularly praised Poehler and Ansari, and said of the episode, "Tune in just to hear her say to her canvassing companion, who complains it's hot and wants to cool off: 'We could blow in each other's faces.'"

== Home media ==
"Canvassing", along with the five other first-season episodes of Parks and Recreation, was released on a one-disc DVD set in the United States on September 8, 2009. The DVD included cast and crew commentary tracks for each episode, as well as about 30 minutes of deleted scenes.

The deleted scenes included on the DVD were originally featured on the official Parks and Recreation website after the episode aired. In the first, a minute-long clip, Ron tries to take a job offer that was previously offered to him at an Internet flower company web site, but when he finds the business is doing so poorly, he sadly realizes he will be in his government job for a long time. In a second minute-long clip, Leslie talks about her very detailed life plan, which involves eventually becoming head of the parks department, then governor of Indiana, then U.S. vice president and then getting married at age 84. The deleted clips were featured on the Parks and Recreation official website within a week of the episode's original production date.
