= Pawnee Zoo =

- Parks and Recreation episode
- Episode no.: Season 2 Episode 1
- Directed by: Paul Feig
- Written by: Norm Hiscock
- Original air date: September 17, 2009

Guest appearances
- Mo Collins as Joan Callamezzo; Josh Ducendeck as Ben; Darlene Hunt as Marcia Langman; Blake Lee as Derek; Jim O'Heir as Jerry Gergich; Retta as Donna Meagle

Episode chronology
← Previous "Rock Show"	Next → "The Stakeout"

"Pawnee Zoo" is the second season premiere of the American comedy television series Parks and Recreation, and the seventh overall episode of the series. It originally aired on NBC in the United States on September 17, 2009. In the episode, Leslie accidentally takes a stand in favor of same-sex marriage when she holds a marriage for two male penguins during a publicity stunt for the zoo.

The episode was written by Norm Hiscock and directed by Paul Feig. The writing staff sought to address more topical issues during the second season, and the same-sex marriage plot was inspired by the real-life pairing of Harry and Pepper, a pair of romantically involved male penguins at the San Francisco Zoo. However, Hiscock said he was focused more strongly on comedy than making a political or social statement.

"Pawnee Zoo" received generally positive reviews, with several commentators claiming it showed improvement and growth compared to the show's first season, which received generally positive reviews. According to Nielsen Media Research, "Pawnee Zoo" was watched by 5 million households. Among viewers aged between 18 and 49, the episode was seen by 30 percent fewer viewers than the first season pilot episode. In March 2010, "Pawnee Zoo" won the GLAAD Media Award for Outstanding Individual Episode.

== Plot ==
The episode opens with Ron saying to Leslie, "Here's the situation...", prompting her to go into a full rendition of the rap "Parents Just Don't Understand". Afterward, he tells her someone is on fire at a park and needs immediate assistance. Later, Leslie holds a marriage for two recently acquired penguins to help promote the Pawnee Zoo. Immediately after the marriage, the two penguins begin having sex in front of a crowd of children, who are informed by an adult in the audience that both penguins are actually males. The Bulge, a gay bar in Pawnee, later sends Leslie a wedding cake with two penguins on top to thank her for supporting the gay community. April introduces Leslie to her boyfriend Derek, who himself also has a boyfriend named Ben, much to Leslie's confusion. They declare her their "hero" for holding the gay penguin wedding, but Leslie insists it was simply a publicity stunt, not a political statement. Nevertheless, Marcia Langman, a member of the Society for Family Stability Foundation, demands she annul the penguin wedding or resign from the parks department.

Ann, who has been nursing Mark at the hospital since he fell into the pit, says he has acted much nicer since the incident. Ann also reveals she has broken up with Andy. Mark and Leslie kissed before he fell, but both insist they are just friends. Mark tries to ask Ann out, but she declines out of respect for Leslie's friendship. Meanwhile, the Bulge holds a party in Leslie's honor, which she attends along with Tom to announce she has not taken a political stand. However, she accepts the free drinks they offer her and ends up getting drunk and having a great time. The next day, she is invited to go on the Pawnee Today talk show to discuss her supposed stance on same-sex marriage with Marcia Langman and television host Joan Callamezzo.

Meanwhile, Andy shows up at Ann's house wearing a fancy suit. He tells her he has matured, gotten an office job and would like to get back together, but Ann declines. The camera follows Andy as he leaves, revealing he is actually living in a tent inside the pit. During the Pawnee Today show, Leslie and Marcia argue fiercely. Leslie insists she has not taken a political position, even after Marcia brings up the recent party at the Bulge. They take several callers, all of whom agree that Leslie should resign. Fed up, Leslie adamantly insists she will not resign, nor will she annul the penguin wedding. Later, she visits Ann and insists that Ann go on a date with Mark. The episode ends with Leslie driving the penguins from the Pawnee Zoo to a zoo in Iowa, where same-sex marriage is legal.

== Production ==
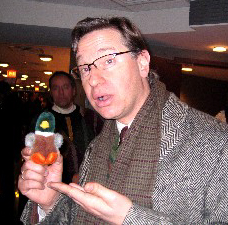
"Pawnee Zoo" was directed by Paul Feig.

"Pawnee Zoo" was written by Norm Hiscock and directed by Paul Feig. It originally aired on NBC in the United States on September 17, 2009. It is the first episode to feature Chris Pratt in the title credits as a regular cast member rather than a guest star. The episode addressed the issue of same-sex marriage, typically a controversial social topic for government officials. The staff of Parks and Recreation sought to address more topical issues with the second season episodes, and the writers discussed with series co-creator Michael Schur possible topics for the season debut. They settled on same-sex marriage, which was an issue of particularly high debate at the time, especially in the Los Angeles area. During that discussion, one of the writers brought up the real-life pairing of Harry and Pepper, a pair of romantically involved male penguins at the San Francisco Zoo. The real-life penguins had separated from each other shortly before the episode aired, which resulted in press coverage that the pair "broke up".

Hiscock felt a gay penguin marriage was a good way to connect Leslie's character and profession to the issue, since a zoo would be part of the parks department. He said, "It seemed like a funny starting place: a cute zoo promotion that spins out of control." Although the storyline is comedic through its use of penguins in the same-sex marriage, commentators inferred the episode nevertheless takes a position in favor of same-sex marriage. Hiscock said in writing the script, he did not intend to make a strong political or social message, and that the staff was more focused on comedy and developing the Leslie Knope character. However, Hiscock said, "What I like is that Leslie doesn't back down from her zoo promotion idea and refuses to annul the wedding. In a weird way she takes a stance."

Within a week of the episode's original broadcast, two deleted scenes from "Pawnee Zoo" were made available on the official Parks and Recreation website. In the first two-and-a-half-minute clip, Tom talks at the penguin wedding about the "penguin bachelor party" he threw for the birds. Later, Tom and April help prepare Leslie for the Pawnee Today show by impersonating the other guests and berating Leslie without giving her a chance to speak. In the second two-minute clip, Andy gives a tour of his home in the pit, and Leslie changes around Ann's apartment to change the feng shui after her breakup with Andy. Ann also gives Mark brownies to bring to Leslie, which he promptly starts to eat himself.

Scenes at the Pawnee Zoo were filmed in Abandoned Zoo Picnic Area in Griffith Park, Los Angeles.

== Cultural references ==
During the episode's cold open, Leslie performs the third verse of "Parents Just Don't Understand", a rap song by DJ Jazzy Jeff & the Fresh Prince, while Ron tries to tell her about an emergency by saying the song's starting line, "Here's the situation". April presents a stylized stencil poster of Leslie designed in a similar way to the Barack Obama "Hope" poster designed by artist Shepard Fairey, with the word "Knope" instead of "Hope". While introducing Leslie at a gay bar, April says Leslie is "here to recruit you", quoting a line from gay rights activist Harvey Milk. At the bar, Leslie sings a karaoke cover of the 2008 Lady Gaga song, "Poker Face". When Leslie insults Tom's shirt, he defends it by claiming it was featured in the monthly men's magazine, Details. When sarcastically asking if Langman wants her to commit harakiri, Leslie accidentally says "harikari," a common mispronunciation of the traditional Japanese cultural term.

== Reception ==
In its original American broadcast on September 17, 2009, "Pawnee Zoo" was seen by 5 million households, according to Nielsen Media Research. The episode received a 2.1 rating among viewers aged between 18 and 49, a 30 percent drop in viewership compared to the first season pilot episode.

No doubt fans who had hoped the series would be something more will be delighted that Parks and Recreation seems to be living up to its potential. And NBC should be ecstatic that Thursday nights, home to two of television's funniest sitcoms in 30 Rock and The Office, got its weakest link fortified into something competitively hilarious.

— Tim Goodman,
San Francisco Chronicle

"Pawnee Zoo" received generally positive reviews. Time magazine writer James Poniewozik felt the episode "beautifully" merged the political and personal and improved upon previous episodes by using and balancing its supporting characters. Poniewozik added, "'Pawnee Zoo' was spot-on, and had me cracking up beginning to end." Henning Fog of Entertainment Weekly said with "Pawnee Zoo", the series appeared to be finding its rhythm and starting to distinguish itself from its conceptual spinoff, The Office, which was also created by Parks and Recreation co-creator Greg Daniels. Fog also felt bringing real social issues into the show was a positive direction for the series. Emily Christianson of the Los Angeles Times said "Pawnee Zoo" improves upon the first season by giving more attention to plot points outside the pit. Christianson particularly enjoyed the scenes with Leslie drunk in the bar, and liked the introduction of the Ann and Mark romance. Los Angeles Times writer Jon Caramanica said the same-sex marriage subplot only alters the show's dynamic "a smidge", and mainly serves as "another opportunity for misadventure for Leslie Knope". Caramanica added Poehler is talented, but ill-suited for the goofy Leslie character.

Maureen Ryan of the Chicago Tribune said the episode appeared to be heading in a better direction than the first season and, regarding Leslie, added "You start to root for her this season, instead of wishing she would go away." She also praised the "Parents Just Don't Understand" rap, comparing it to Poehler's acclaimed rap about then-vice presidential candidate Sarah Palin during a Saturday Night Live sketch. Matt Fowler of IGN said "Pawnee Zoo" was "more solidly entertaining" than the entire first season, and made a stronger effort to build up the supporting cast, particularly by establishing a romance between Jones and Schneider. Fowler particularly praised Pratt and voiced excitement for his new subplot. San Francisco Chronicle writer Tim Goodman, who was very critical of the Parks and Recreation first season, said "Pawnee Zoo" brought new life to the series. Goodman felt the Leslie character was less clueless and ditzy, and that same-sex marriage was "perfect fodder" for the show. Steve Heisler of The A.V. Club commented the "Pawnee Zoo" plot was strong, the supporting cast performed well and that Poehler feels "a lot more comfortable in Knope's skin." But Heisler said it "isn't the best thing on tonight." Not all reviews were positive. Verne Gay of Newsday voiced admiration for Parks and Recreation, but found "Pawnee Zoo" to be "flat, forced and messagey", and did not make proper use of the supporting cast. He gave the premiere episode a C+ grade. Johnny Firecloud of CraveOnline praised Poehler and the "Parents Just Don't Understand" opening, but felt cast members like Jones are wasted. He also said there is little chemistry between Jones and Schneider.

In March 2010, "Pawnee Zoo" won the GLAAD Media Award for Outstanding Individual Episode (in a series without a regular LGBT character). It was nominated alongside the ABC drama series Private Practice, the NBC supernatural drama The Listener and the CW drama/horror series Supernatural in the category.

== DVD release ==
"Pawnee Zoo", along with the other 23 second season episodes of Parks and Recreation, was released on a four-disc DVD set in the United States on November 30, 2010. The DVD included deleted scenes for each episode.
