= Parks and Recreation season 6 =

Season of television series

Parks and Recreation
- Season 6
- Region 1 DVD cover art
- Showrunner: Michael Schur
- Starring: Amy Poehler; Rashida Jones; Aziz Ansari; Nick Offerman; Aubrey Plaza; Chris Pratt; Adam Scott; Rob Lowe; Jim O'Heir; Retta
- No. of episodes: 22

Release
- Original network: NBC
- Original release: September 26, 2013 – April 24, 2014

Season chronology
- ← Previous; Season 5 Next → Season 7

The sixth season of Parks and Recreation originally aired in the United States on the NBC television network, from September 26, 2013, with an hour long premiere, and concluded on April 24, 2014, with an hour-long finale. It premiered in its new Thursday 8:00 pm timeslot. This season consisted of 22 episodes. It stars Amy Poehler, Rashida Jones, Aziz Ansari, Nick Offerman, Aubrey Plaza, Chris Pratt, Adam Scott, Rob Lowe, Jim O'Heir, and Retta. The show moved to Thursdays at 8:30 pm beginning with its 100th episode.

Much like the other seasons, season 6 follows Leslie Knope (Poehler) and her co-workers in local government of fictional Indiana town, Pawnee. The season chronicles Leslie facing the recall vote from City Council, Ann Perkins's (Jones) and Chris Traeger's (Lowe) move to Michigan to start their family, Andy Dwyer's (Pratt) career in London, and the city merger of Eagleton and Pawnee, resulting in the Unity Concert organized by Leslie.

== Cast ==
=== Main ===
- Amy Poehler as Leslie Knope, the councilwoman for the town of Pawnee who loves her home town. She has not let politics dampen her optimism; her ultimate goal is to become President of the United States. Poehler departed from the NBC sketch comedy series Saturday Night Live, where she was a cast member for nearly seven years, to star in Parks and Recreation. It was only after she was cast that Daniels and Schur established the general concept of the show and the script for the pilot was written.
- Rashida Jones as Ann Perkins, a nurse and political outsider who gradually becomes more involved in Pawnee government through her friendship with Leslie. Jones was among the first to be cast by Daniels and Schur in 2008, when the series was still being considered as a spin-off to The Office, where Jones had played Jim Halpert's girlfriend Karen Filippelli.
- Aziz Ansari as Tom Haverford, Leslie's sarcastic and underachieving subordinate, who eventually begins to consider leaving his city hall job to pursue his own entrepreneurial interests. As with Jones, Daniels and Schur had intended to cast Ansari from the earliest stages of the development of Parks and Recreation.
- Nick Offerman as Ron Swanson, the deadpan parks and recreation director who, as a libertarian, believes in as small a government as possible. As such, Ron strives to make his department as ineffective as possible, and favors hiring employees who do not care about their jobs or are poor at them. Nevertheless, Ron consistently demonstrates that he secretly cares deeply about his co-workers.
- Aubrey Plaza as April Ludgate, a cynical and uninterested parks department intern who eventually becomes the perfect assistant for Ron. The role was written specifically for Plaza; after meeting her, casting director Allison Jones told Schur, "I just met the weirdest girl I've ever met in my life. You have to meet her and put her on your show."
- Chris Pratt as Andy Dwyer, a goofy and dim-witted but lovable slacker. Pratt was originally intended to be a guest star and the character Andy was initially meant to appear only in the first season, but the producers liked Pratt so much that, almost immediately after casting him, they decided to make him a regular cast member starting with season two.
- Adam Scott as Ben Wyatt, Leslie's husband, a competent but socially awkward government official trying to redeem his past as a failed mayor in his youth. Scott left his starring role on the Starz comedy series Party Down to join the show.
- Rob Lowe as Chris Traeger, an excessively positive and extremely health-conscious government official. Unlike Scott, Lowe was originally expected to depart after a string of guest appearances, but later signed a multi-year contract to become a regular cast member.
- Jim O'Heir as Jerry Gergich, a sweet-natured but painfully incompetent longtime city employee who is the main target of the office petty unkindness, yet enjoys his life as the husband of a gorgeous woman and the father of three beautiful daughters. He reached retirement with a full pension in season 5, but returned to the Parks office to work as an intern. As of season six, the other characters have taken to calling him "Larry Gengurch," after accidentally calling himself that name.
- Retta as Donna Meagle, the confident and competent office manager for the Pawnee Parks and Recreation Department. She is now accepting of her coworkers, previously dismissing them as boring. She has little tolerance for stupidity, can sometimes be selfish, enjoys casual dating, and is irresistible to many men. Donna loves her car, a Mercedes-Benz M-Class SUV.

=== Recurring ===
- John Balma as Barney Varmn, an accountant. He regularly attempts to hire Ben as an employee.
- Alison Becker as Shauna Malwae-Tweep, a newspaper journalist working for The Pawnee Journal.
- Kristen Bell as Ingrid de Forest, an elitist city councilwoman from Eagleton.
- Lucy Lawless as Diane Lewis, a middle school vice-principal and Ron's wife.
- Richard Burch as Herman Lerpiss, the owner of the Pawnee Pawn Shop.
- Andrew Burlinson as Wyatt "Burly" Burlison, the lead guitarist of Andy's band "Mouse Rat".
- Mo Collins as Joan Callamezzo, a tabloid journalist and hostess of the local news/talk show Pawnee Today.
- Billy Eichner as Craig Middlebrooks, the former office manager of Eagleton's parks department. After the Pawnee-Eagleton city merger, he is brought into the Pawnee parks department as the "associate administrator", and forms a friendship with Donna.
- Sydney Endicott as Madison, a young intern at the parks department.
- Mary Faber as Kathryn Pinewood, a representative for the Pawnee Restaurant Association.
- Andy Forrest as Kyle, a government employee who is constantly ridiculed by Andy.
- Jon Glaser as Councilman Jeremy Jamm, a member of the Pawnee city council and Leslie's nemesis.
- James Greene as Councilman Fielding Milton, the longest serving member of the Pawnee city council.
- Eric Isenhower as Orin, a creepy and disturbed friend of April.
- Jay Jackson as Perd Hapley, a popular Pawnee television journalist and the host of news programs Ya Heard? With Perd! and The Final Word with Perd!.
- Marc Evan Jackson as Trevor Nelsson, one of Pawnee's top attorneys in the employment of Dr. Saperstein.
- Yvans Jourdain as Councilman Douglass Howser, the head of the Pawnee city council.
- Richard Portnow as Mitch Savner, a local businessman and potential investor for Tom's restaurant.
- Ben Schwartz as Jean-Ralphio Saperstein, Tom's dimwitted and cocky best friend.
- Jenny Slate as Mona-Lisa Saperstein, Tom's crazy ex-girlfriend and Jean-Ralphio's sister.
- Helen Slayton-Hughes as Ethel Beavers, an elderly government employee.
- Brady Smith as Grant Larson, director of the Midwest branch of the National Park Service.
- Kevin Symons as Councilman Bill Dexhart, a member of the Pawnee city council who is frequently embroiled in outrageous sex scandals.
- Cooper Thornton as Dr. Harris, a sarcastic doctor at Pawnee's hospital.
- Jeff Tweedy as Scott Tanner, the former lead singer of a band called "Land Ho!".
- Susan Yeagley as Jessica Wicks, the vain and superficial widow of Nick Newport Sr., one of the richest men in Pawnee.
- Henry Winkler as Dr. Saperstein, a gynecologist and father of Jean-Ralphio and Mona-Lisa.

=== Guest stars ===
- Blake Anderson as Mike Bean, CEO of tech company "Gryzzl".
- Matt Besser as Crazy Ira, one of the hosts of the radio show Crazy Ira and The Douche.
- Chris Bosh as himself.
- Dan Castellaneta as Derry Murbles, the host of the Pawnee radio show Thoughts for Your Thoughts.
- The Decemberists as themselves.
- Bo Burnham as Chip McCapp, a spoiled teenage country singer.
- Sam Elliott as Ron Dunn, the former head of the Eagleton parks department.
- Ginuwine as a fictional version of himself; he is Donna's cousin.
- Kathryn Hahn as Jennifer Barkley, a successful political campaign manager and old acquaintance of Ben and Leslie.
- Jon Hamm as Ed, an incompetent employee at the National Park Service.
- Kay Hanley as herself.
- Erinn Hayes as Annabel Porter, a well-respected Pawnee lifestyle guru.
- John Hodgman as August Clementine, an Eagleton radio host.
- Rob Huebel as Harvey Spielyorm, the unlikable owner of a tent store.
- Keegan-Michael Key as Joe, a school principal and Donna's ex-boyfriend.
- Heidi Klum as Ulee Danssen, the mayor of a town in Denmark.
- Nick Kroll as Howard "The Douche" Tuttleman, one of the hosts of the Pawnee radio show Crazy Ira and The Douche.
- Letters to Cleo as themselves.
- Andrew Luck as himself.
- Tatiana Maslany as Nadia Stasky, a doctor and love interest for Tom.
- Robert Mathis as himself.
- Megan Mullally as Tammy Swanson (aka Tammy Two), Ron's sex-crazed ex-wife.
- Michelle Obama as herself.
- June Diane Raphael as Tynnyfer, a former employee of the Eagleton parks department.
- Peter Serafinowicz as His Royal Excellence Lord Edgar Darby Covington, 14th Earl of Cornwall-Upon-Thames and 29th Baron of Hertfordshire, who also goes by the name "Eddie", the head of a British charitable organization.
- Yo La Tengo as Bobby Knight Ranger, a fictional Night Ranger tribute band.
- Adam Vinatieri as himself.

== Production ==
On July 31, 2013, it was reported by BuzzFeed that Rob Lowe and Rashida Jones would be leaving the series around the middle of the season. Their final episode was episode 13, "Ann and Chris". Due to the departure of Jones and Lowe, longtime regulars Jim O'Heir and Retta were added to the show's opening credit sequence starting with episode 14, "Anniversaries". Jones appears as a special guest star in episode 17 when Ann has her baby.

Chris Pratt was absent for much of the early part of the season, due to him filming Guardians of the Galaxy in London. Executive producer Michael Schur stated the show went to London for the first two episodes in order for Pratt's character Andy to make an appearance. Pratt made a brief return in the sixth episode, with Schur adding that Pratt would return to the series in the tenth episode, the series' 100th episode.

In February 2014, NBC announced a digital tie-in for the show, titled "The Hapley Group", which aired on February 20. Created "to help viewers remain engaged with their favorite programs" while NBC broadcasts the 2014 Winter Olympics, it featured Jay Jackson, Matt Besser, Nick Kroll and Mo Collins reprising their roles as Perd Hapley, Crazy Ira, The Douche, and Joan Callamezzo, respectively, with Seth Morris as Mike Patterson, a new character who recurred on the TV show as well. The tie-in, directed by Morgan Sackett and written by Greg Levine, features the characters in a heated, political round-table discussion of Pawnee's hot topics.

Retta tweeted on February 27, 2014, that filming for the season had finished.

== Episodes ==
^{†} denotes an extended episode. ^{‡} denotes an hour-long episode.

Parks and Recreation, season 6 episodes
No. overall	No. in season	Title	Directed by	Written by	Original release date	U.S. viewers (millions)
91	1	"London"^{‡}	Dean Holland	Michael Schur	September 26, 2013	3.27
92	2	"London"^{‡}	Dean Holland	Michael Schur	September 26, 2013	3.27
Continuing moments after the previous episode, as Diane tells Ron that she's pregnant, Ron proposes, and they get married in the municipal building. Leslie wins an international award that takes her, Ben, Andy, April and Ron to London, while Tom learns who his business competitor is. Ann and Chris progress in their relationship.
93	3	"The Pawnee-Eagleton Tip Off Classic"	Nicole Holofcener	Alan Yang	October 3, 2013	3.14
Leslie, Ben and Chris go to Eagleton on government business, while Ann takes April to her veterinary school orientation in Bloomington. Ron attempts to destroy every piece of evidence of his existence after receiving a junk mail flier, and Ann suggests that she and Chris move away from Pawnee after their baby is born.
94	4	"Doppelgängers"	Jay Karas	Donick Cary	October 10, 2013	3.23
Leslie pairs the Pawnee Parks Department with their Eagleton counterparts, however, none of them seem to get along. Jerry (now known as Larry) comes out of retirement to become the Parks' department filer. Ann tells Leslie that she and Chris are planning to move away from Pawnee to Michigan, which Leslie does not take well.
95	5	"Gin It Up!"	Jorma Taccone	Matt Murray	October 17, 2013	3.27
When Donna uses the department's Twitter account instead of her own, Leslie helps calm the over reaction to the sex-themed tweet. Elsewhere, Tom tries to impress someone who stops by the Parks Department by making her simple request take extra long, and Ron meets with a lawyer to craft his last will.
96	6	"Filibuster"	Morgan Sackett	Harris Wittels	November 14, 2013	3.03
Andy returns briefly from London, while Ron takes Donna hunting after failing at a computer version. Leslie plans a 1990s themed birthday party for Ben, only to miss it in order to attend a filibuster to fight for the rights of former Eagletonians to vote.
97	7	"Recall Vote"	Wendey Stanzler	Aisha Muharrar	November 14, 2013	3.03
Leslie prepares Halloween festivities at town hall on the day of her recall vote, while Ron convinces Tom to sell his business in order to gain money through the deal.
98	8	"Fluoride"	Michael Trim	Matt Hubbard	November 21, 2013	2.81
Leslie accepts that she has been recalled, and attempts to introduce Eagleton's water fluoridation to Pawnee, using a new attitude as a lame duck, but Jamm ruins it with fear-mongering. Tom counters with T-Dazzle, a rebrand, but Jamm decides to introduce Drink-ems, an unhealthy drink to replace water. Leslie berates Sweetums for the Drink-ems idea, which costs Ben his job. Needing Ben to have a job, Leslie decides to apologize, but through encouragement from Ben, she gets Tom to once again rebrand fluoride as H2-Flow, which successfully works. Meanwhile, Chris tries to learn parenting techniques from a reluctant Ron, who is really just showing him how to build a crib. Elsewhere, Donna gets upset with April for choosing spirit dogs for the department, and choosing hers under basic explanations.
99	9	"The Cones of Dunshire"	Julie Anne Robinson	Dave King	November 21, 2013	2.81
Leslie faces off with Councilman Jamm on a park proposal. Laid-off Ben gets a new hobby, before accepting a job offer from an accounting firm that has been courting him for two years. Tom, April and Donna help Ron sell his cabin. Chris gets Leslie to finally come to terms with his and Ann's move to Michigan.
100	10	"Second Chunce"^{†}	Dean Holland	Amy Poehler & Michael Schur	January 9, 2014	3.43
Leslie comes to terms with her last days in office, but when Councilman Dexhart gets into another scandal, she tries to convince the department that she should run again for Dexhart's seat. Meanwhile, Ann and Chris find out that they are having a boy. Andy comes home from London.
101	11	"New Beginnings"	Alan Yang	Sam Means	January 16, 2014	3.05
Leslie returns to her old job and Ben becomes City Manager after Chris stepped down. April and Andy pull pranks on Ben.
102	12	"Farmers Market"	Adam Scott	Joe Mande	January 23, 2014	2.98
Leslie fights with Ben over the ways the new Farmers Market is being handled. The department gets annoyed with Ann's pregnancy aspects. April supports Andy on playing music for children.
103	13	"Ann and Chris"	Dean Holland	Aisha Muharrar & Michael Schur	January 30, 2014	3.03
Leslie throws a goodbye party for Ann and Chris and tries to fulfill a promise by finally beginning to break ground on Pawnee Commons (the project that got her and Ann together). The guys search for a going-away gift for Chris. Ann and Chris say their goodbyes and leave Pawnee.
104	14	"Anniversaries"	Morgan Sackett	Megan Amram	February 27, 2014	2.52
Ben tries to surprise Leslie with an anniversary gift, but ends up spending more time with Larry. Donna doesn't show up for work, so April tries to discipline her using the internet which backfires. Leslie tries to put a spin on the Pawnee-Eagleton merger. Andy and Tom come up with an idea to hold a concert to celebrate the merger. Meanwhile, Ron writes letters to all the things he hates.
105	15	"The Wall"	Ken Whittingham	Jen Statsky	March 6, 2014	2.95
Ben and Tom try to get sponsors for the Pawnee/Eagleton unity concert and Tom ends up getting an investment offer for one of his ideas; Leslie tries to tear down the wall dividing the two towns, only to release bees, causing Jamm to propose a secede bill; Leslie also gets an offer to run a new National Parks office out of Chicago. Meanwhile, Ron begins to bring his newborn son, John, to the office, as he rebuilds an abandoned floor in Town Hall.
106	16	"New Slogan"	Dean Holland	Alan Yang & Sam Means	March 13, 2014	2.72
Ben revamps the Pawnee website, on which Leslie solicits suggestions for a new town slogan, but The Douche convinces his radio listeners to write in obscene slogans. April tries to keep Tom from leaving by saying bad things about potential restaurant locations. She realizes Donna was doing the same thing by showing him awful locations, so they both try to make things right. Andy discovers Ron is Duke Silver and tries to convince him to play the unity concert.
107	17	"Galentine's Day"	Beth McCarthy-Miller	Emma Fletcher & Rachna Fruchbom	March 20, 2014	3.05
Leslie throws a Galentine's Day brunch in an effort to find a new best friend. Ben, Tom and Larry search for tents for the Unity Concert. With new parental instincts Ron looks after Andy. Meanwhile, Leslie visits Ann after she gives birth to her baby, Oliver.
108	18	"Prom"	Ken Whittingham	Matt Murray & Harris Wittels	April 3, 2014	2.67
After it is cut from the budget, Leslie brings back the senior prom, and asks Ben and Tom to be DJs. Andy tries everything to get April, who hates prom, to go with him.
109	19	"Flu Season 2"^{†}	Nick Offerman	Megan Amram & Dave King	April 10, 2014	2.56
Leslie and Andy try to find music for the unity concert while battling the flu; Donna, Tom and April go wine tasting for Tom's new restaurant. Ron and Ben have a bonding session. Later, Ben realizes he wants to start a family, and Leslie announces that she is pregnant.
110	20	"One in 8,000"	Dean Holland	Donick Cary & Joe Mande	April 17, 2014	2.39
Leslie and Ben try to keep Leslie's pregnancy a secret, which proves a problem when they realize she is having triplets. Meanwhile, Donna seeks Ron's help dealing with her ex-boyfriend at a school, and April organizes Andy's schedule while trying to learn his secret. Leslie and Ben eventually tell the office, with everyone offering some form of help to them once the babies arrive.
111	21	"Moving Up"^{†‡}	Michael Schur	Aisha Muharrar & Alan Yang	April 24, 2014	2.71
112	22	"Moving Up"^{†‡}	Michael Schur	Aisha Muharrar & Alan Yang	April 24, 2014	2.71
Leslie, Ben, and Andy visit San Francisco for a National Parks Conference, where Ben (with the help of First Lady Michelle Obama) convinces Leslie to take the job in Chicago. Tom opens his restaurant early, which backfires and the investor pulls out. The Parks Department holds the Pawnee/Eagleton Unity Concert, which is a success. Tom reopens his restaurant the night of the concert, having better luck this time and gaining another investor. Later, Leslie convinces her National Parks boss to bring her job to Pawnee, using the City Hall building's third floor that Ron has finished renovating. Three years later in the future, Leslie is shown being stressed but successful at her new job, while she and Ben raise their triplets.

== Reception ==
The sixth season of Parks and Recreation largely received positive praise from critics. Rotten Tomatoes gave the season a 96% rating based on 23 critic reviews with an average rating of 8.8/10. The critical consensus reads: "Consistently bouyed [sic] by strong character work and an overarching optimism, Parks and Recreation remains a charming, fun and funny half hour to spend with Leslie Knope and co."
