= Pilot (Parks and Recreation) =

- Parks and Recreation episode
- Episode no.: Season 1 Episode 1
- Directed by: Greg Daniels
- Written by: Greg Daniels; Michael Schur
- Original air date: April 9, 2009

Guest appearances
- Martin Chow as David; Jon Daly as Drunk; Jim O'Heir as Jerry Gergich; Bryce Hurless as Older Boy; Chris Pratt as Andy Dwyer; Retta as Donna Meagle; Ian Roberts as Ian Winston; Loudon Wainwright III as Barry; Lennon Wynn as Little Girl

Episode chronology
← Previous —	Next → "Canvassing"
- Parks and Recreation season 1

"Pilot" is the pilot episode of the American comedy television series Parks and Recreation. It originally aired on NBC in the United States on April 9, 2009. The episode was written by series creators Michael Schur and Greg Daniels, and directed by Daniels.

The episode introduces the protagonist Leslie Knope, played by Amy Poehler, as well as the other regular characters played by cast members Rashida Jones, Paul Schneider, Aziz Ansari, Aubrey Plaza and Nick Offerman. Knope is a mid-level bureaucrat in the Parks and Recreation department in the fictional town of Pawnee, Indiana. In "Pilot", Knope sets out to turn a construction pit into a park after local nurse Ann Perkins (Jones) complains about the dangerous pit during a town meeting. Her anti-government boss Ron Swanson (Offerman) reluctantly allows her to form an exploratory committee after her friend and colleague Mark Brendanawicz (Schneider) secretly intervenes on her behalf.

Daniels and Schur first started writing the script in the summer of 2008, when they were in the early stages of conceiving the series. Like the rest of the series, the pilot was filmed in the same mockumentary style as The Office, the NBC comedy series also directed by Daniels. About one month before the pilot aired, a focus group report discussing several perceived problems with the episode was leaked to the media, which led to speculation that Parks and Recreation was not ready for prime-time television. The pilot episode featured a number of cultural references to such people as Bob Knight, Larry Bird and Laura Linney, as well as female political figures to whom Leslie compares herself, such as Hillary Clinton, Sarah Palin, and Nancy Pelosi.

"Pilot" received generally mixed reviews, although Poehler herself was widely praised by most television critics. According to Nielsen Media Research, "Pilot" was watched by 6.77 million households in its original airing. Although it received lower ratings than the two Office episodes it aired between, television critics pointed out it achieved an identical rating to the NBC show 30 Rock, which was broadcast the same night. The pilot, along with the rest of the first season of Parks and Recreation, was released on DVD in the United States on September 8, 2009.

== Plot ==
The episode opens with Leslie Knope, the deputy director of the Department of Parks and Recreation with six years of experience in the town of Pawnee, Indiana, discussing with a documentary crew her strong belief in the power of government to help other people. Later, Leslie hosts a community outreach public forum at an elementary school along with her jaded colleague Tom Haverford. Leslie is enthusiastic despite the low turnout and angry complaints, which she describes as "people caring loudly at me". Local nurse Ann Perkins complains about a giant pit near her house, which was dug out by a condominium developer that went bankrupt in the middle of the construction project. Ann says that her boyfriend Andy Dwyer broke both his legs after falling into the pit, and she demands something be done about it. Leslie is inspired by the challenge and makes a "pinky promise" that she will fill in the pit and build a park on the land.

Leslie seeks advice from city planner Mark Brendanawicz, who feels the project would prove practically impossible due to the logistics and bureaucratic red tape, but Leslie is undeterred. Leslie later fondly tells the documentary crew that she and Mark had sex five years ago, but Mark only vaguely recalls the encounter. Leslie, Tom and uninterested intern April Ludgate visit Ann and meet Andy, a lazy and demanding musician whom she is forced to wait on and support financially. Afterward, Leslie and Ann visit the pit, which Leslie accidentally falls into as Tom and April make fun of her. Ann quickly provides medical assistance. Afterward, Leslie leaves, and Ann tells the documentary crew, "She's a little doofy, but she's sweet". Sometime later, Leslie asks her boss Ron Swanson for permission to form an exploratory committee for the pit project. Ron initially refuses, but eventually agrees to consider it so that Leslie will leave his office. Ron explains that he does not want the Parks Department to build any parks because he believes the government is a waste of money, and that all government should be privatized and run by corporations for profit. Leslie repeatedly pesters Ron about the park project, but he refuses to commit.

Meanwhile, Tom and April continue to make fun of Leslie, much to the displeasure of Mark. Mark, who tells the documentary crew he is impressed that Leslie has somehow maintained her optimism about government for six years, secretly asks Ron to give her the park project. Mark said doing so would return a favor Ron owes him for unspecified reasons. Leslie and Ann are extremely excited about the new exploratory subcommittee, and the department celebrates by getting drunk. Despite her skepticism about politics and government, a drunken Ann pledges to do whatever it takes to help get the pit filled in, "even if it takes two months". The episode ends with Ron explaining to the documentary crew how he makes his office as uninviting as possible.

== Production ==
=== Conception ===
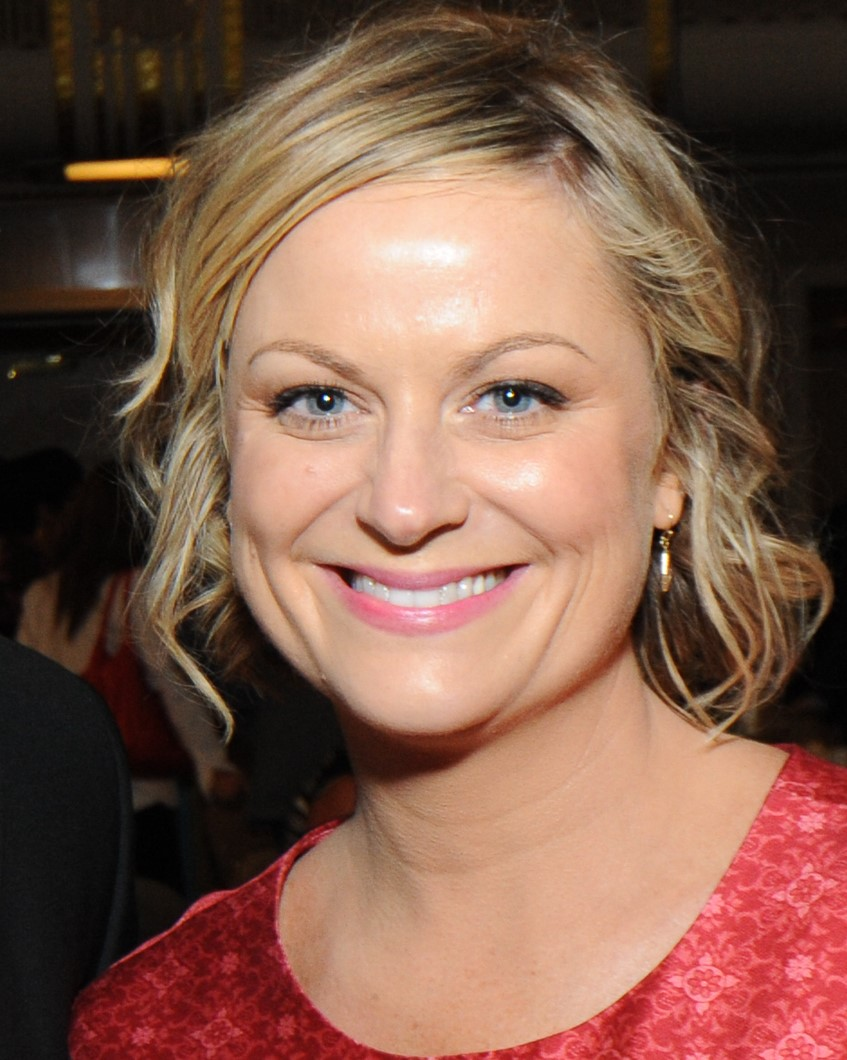
Actress and comedian Amy Poehler (pictured) plays protagonist Leslie Knope in Parks and Recreation

Immediately after Ben Silverman was named co-chairman of NBC's entertainment division in 2007, he asked Greg Daniels to create a new comedy series. Silverman and Daniels previously worked together on The Office, a half-hour comedy Daniels adapted from the British comedy of the same name by Ricky Gervais and Stephen Merchant. Daniels wrote the pilot for what eventually became Parks and Recreation along with series co-creator Michael Schur, who had served as a writer on The Office. Daniels and Schur had been considering ideas for a possible show with cast members Rashida Jones and Aziz Ansari, but the concept for the series did not form until they learned Amy Poehler could play the lead character. Once that casting was determined, the script for the pilot episode was first written in the summer of 2008 revolving around her as a city bureaucrat seeking to turn an enormous construction pit into a park. They also decided the script would include the mockumentary comedy style of The Office and, like that show, would allow for improvisation on set. However, they did not consider the script an Office spin-off and NBC officials vehemently insisted to media outlets that the show was a completely separate series, despite the similarities between the two shows.

=== Writing ===
The first draft of the script portrayed Leslie and Mark as slightly less likable characters. Originally, Mark asked Ron to green-light the park project not to help Leslie, but because he was attracted to Ann and wanted another excuse to keep seeing her. These elements of the script were changed after press tours and focus group screenings. The show's writers spent time researching local California politics and attended Los Angeles City Council meetings. Daniels and Schur wanted the pilot to establish that one of Leslie's duties was talking to the public on a regular basis, and they deliberately portrayed her public forum meetings as poorly attended except by a select group of angry residents. Schur said, "I've been to some community meetings in my life, and it is often this feeling of utter sparseness. That nobody cares." In writing the script, Schur wanted Mark and Leslie to have a long history together before the events of the episode, rather than having the two characters meet for the first time on screen, which he felt had already been done in many television shows. The first shot of the pilot was originally a scene with Ann standing over the pit and staring at it with an annoyed expression, followed by a documentary interview with Ann and Andy. The opening scene was changed because Daniels and Schur decided they wanted the first scene of the series to be set in a park. As a result, the episode started with a cold open of Leslie interviewing children in a park, then using a broom to push a drunk man out of a spiral slide. Daniels had such a specific vision for the scene, he drew an elaborate and detailed storyboard sketch of a drunk man stuck in a tubular slide.

Some parts of the episode consisted of a mixture of written dialogue and comedic improvisation from the actors. In one such scene, Aziz Ansari attempts to flirt with Rashida Jones when she speaks at a Parks and Recreation public forum. The scene was included in the script, but Ansari continued to improvise long after his dialogue ended, and Jones said she found it difficult to keep a straight face during filming. Schur encouraged Ansari to continue, and suggested the line in which Ansari asks to go away with Jones for the weekend. Daniels called the scene "probably the highlight of the pilot." The ending included another example of written dialogue mixed with improvisation, when Ansari recited a list of unusual things Leslie has attempted to do while drunk. In other scenes, the written dialogue was abandoned altogether in favor of improvisation, such as the scene of Ann and Andy talking on Ann's couch after Leslie fell into the pit and injured herself. Chris Pratt improvised a number of other lines and scenes in the episode, including when Andy asked Leslie to pass him his "itch stick", which he then used to scratch under his leg cast in an awkward and disgusting way.

The pilot script included several political cultural references. Leslie compares herself to Secretary of State Hillary Clinton and House Speaker Nancy Pelosi in describing the prevalence of women in government. Leslie invokes former U.S. Presidents Richard Nixon and George W. Bush as shining examples of democracy. The episode also features several references to sports figures. Ron has a poster of Bob Knight, the famous retired basketball coach, hanging in his office. The Bobby Knight image later had to be removed from the show for legal reasons. Leslie has an autographed photo of Indiana-born basketball player Larry Bird on her desk. It reads, "To Lesly, Sink That Shot, Larry B." This is a reference to a deleted scene in which Tom reveals he has tricked Leslie into believing he has brunch with Bird once a month. Tom himself actually faked the autograph, and deliberately misspelled her name "Lesly" as a joke.

=== Filming ===
Michael Schur made his directorial debut with the pilot episode. The original cut of the pilot episode was 48 minutes long, and had to be trimmed down to 22 minutes. Due to the improvisational style and hand-held camerawork of the series, a great deal of extra footage is filmed in each episode and ultimately has to be discarded for the final cut. Amy Poehler said of this, "For every show, there could probably be a second show of stuff we've edited out." Brief portions of those deleted scenes were interwoven into short montage sequences that played along with dialogue from the documentary-style interviews conducted within the episode with the characters.

Although the series shared the same mockumentary style as The Office, Daniels and Schur sought to establish a slightly different tone in the camerawork of the pilot episode of Parks and Recreation. For example, the documentary-style interviews with characters sometimes feature two separate angles on the same person, with footage of the two different angles intercut into a single scene for the final episode. This distinguishing technique was inspired by The Five Obstructions, a 2003 documentary by Lars von Trier and Jørgen Leth, which Daniels watched at the suggestion of actor Paul Schneider. The pilot episode also makes use of the jump cut technique more often than in The Office. In one example from the pilot episode, a scene repeatedly jumps cuts to several brief clips in which Leslie seeks permission from Ron to pursue the pit project.

The pilot episode was filmed in southern California. The construction pit featured in the episode was dug out by the episode's producers at an undeveloped property in Van Nuys, a district in Los Angeles. The producers went door-to-door to neighboring residents to seek their permission, then rented construction equipment to dig the hole in the ground. The pit was guarded 24 hours a day, and paparazzi regularly came to the set to take photos of the actors during filming. The exterior of the Pawnee government building, and several of the hallway scenes, were shot at the Pasadena city hall building. The interior parks and recreation department scenes were filmed on a sound stage. The windows could drop water that would simulate falling rain, and the windowsills included fake pigeons. The cold open scene was filmed in an actual playground in Los Angeles. The spiral tube slide used in the scene was the only one of its type left in the city, because the rest had been deemed too dangerous and removed. The public forum scenes were filmed in a Los Angeles middle school. The script originally called for the meeting to be held in a classroom because the auditorium door was locked. However, Daniels said the writers thought the school's auditorium was such a "cool location" that they added a scene in which the auditorium lights were turned off in the middle of the meeting.

Singer-songwriter Loudon Wainwright III makes a cameo as Barry, one of the citizens who makes wild complaints at the parks and recreation community meeting. Wainwright was selected for the part at the suggestion of casting director Allison Jones. Comedian and actor Ian Roberts, who worked with Amy Poehler on the Upright Citizens Brigade sketch comedy troupe, also made a cameo at the public meeting as Ian Winston, a man complaining about cursing at the park. During filming, guest star Chris Pratt said Poehler "[went] out of her way" to welcome him, and that her polite behavior put him at ease during filming.

== Reception ==
=== Pre-broadcast feedback ===
Parks and Recreation was rushed into production for the pilot to meet the April 9 premiere date. As a result, when the series was paneled at a January 2009 television critics press tour, NBC did not have a finished episode to air, and only had a copy of the pilot episode script available for critics to review. Some of the parts were not yet cast, and without a finalized title, the series was known only as The Untitled Amy Poehler Project or TUAPP. Alan Sepinwall, television writer for The Star-Ledger, said he found the script very funny even though he normally hates reading comedy scripts "because they're rarely as funny on the page as they are coming out of an actor's mouth".

According to a March 18 report that was leaked to television journalist Nikki Finke, focus groups responded poorly to a screening of the rough-cut version of the pilot. Several viewers felt the show was a "carbon copy" of The Office, and needed to be differentiated from that series to avoid coming across as forced and unoriginal. Some viewers found it predictable, slow-paced and lacking character development, and felt the beginning of the episode needed to better explain the situation and setting. Several viewers said the show lacked quality male characters, particularly a "datable" lead male. Other viewers, however, said The Office needed time to develop into a quality show, and they felt audiences would be more patient with Parks and Recreation than other shows due to its connection to The Office. Viewers also said the show's portrayal of bureaucracy of local government was "very believable" and could provide quirky and silly situations for the show, and they liked Poehler's character and performance. The release of the report led to speculation in the media that Parks and Recreations was not ready for prime-time television. In response to the leaked negative feedback, Ben Silverman said rough cuts of shows are usually received negatively, even for ultimately successful shows. Schur also said there had been at least four complete edits to the pilot since the focus-group results came in.

=== Ratings ===
The Parks and Recreation pilot first aired on April 9, 2009, in the United States on NBC. It was shown in a time slot between two fifth season episodes of The Office: "Dream Team" and "Michael Scott Paper Company". In its original American broadcast on April 9, the pilot was watched by 6.77 million overall households, according to Nielsen Media Research. Media outlets described it as a solid rating for the premiere, and said it was comparable to average ratings for 30 Rock, another contemporary Thursday night NBC comedy; 30 Rock achieved the same 6.8 million overall household rating during the 9:30 p.m. time slot on April 9. "Pilot" also had a 40 percent higher rating than the final episode of Kath & Kim, which previously held the show's time slot. However, "Pilot" did not capture the same number of viewers as the Office episodes that ran before and after it. "Dream Team", which ran at 8 p.m., drew 7.2 million households, and "Michael Scott Paper Company", which ran at 9 p.m., drew 8 million households.

=== Critical response ===
The episode received mixed reviews from television critics. Daniel Carlson of The Hollywood Reporter said Parks and Recreation appears to be a "genuinely funny and engaging comedy" and that inevitable comparisons to The Office are not fair; he also said Poehler "proves instantly she's got the comic intelligence to carry a series like this one". Ken Tucker of Entertainment Weekly said "Pilot" lacked the "snap and clear character delineation" of The Office, but pointed out that show also appeared flat in early episodes; Tucker said he liked the performances, attitude and atmosphere of the show, although it had few laugh out loud moments. Matthew Gilbert of The Boston Globe said the show has the potential to become a "flip, witty political allegory" and praised Poehler and the supporting cast. Los Angeles Times television critic Robert Lloyd praised the show for providing strong female leads, which he said was rare on television. He also said, "It has a kind of sunny charm, a premise fit for a novel... Poehler and Jones have a nice, contrapuntal rhythm. I stamp this show: approved."

"The Parks and Recreation pilot is funny, with mounds of potential. Its problem is that it seems to be actively downplaying its distinctiveness by emphasizing the surface resemblance to The Office. Whether it manages to do so is still an open question."

— James Poniewozik, TIME

Alan Sepinwall of The Star-Ledger said the series needs to find a way to distinguish Leslie from Steve Carell's Michael Scott from The Office, but he said the pilot episode was funny, particularly the Aziz Ansari character. Sepinwall also said The Office did not find its footing until the second season, so comparisons simply based on the pilot were not fair. Alessandra Stanley of The New York Times said the supporting cast needed stronger writing and reinforcements, but that Poehler was excellent in a lead role unique for women because it is based on weakness and wrongheadedness, but still a positive and strong part. Stanley said, "The pilot episode isn’t perfect, but Ms. Poehler very nearly is." Verne Gay of Newsday said Poehler has "plenty of appeal here" so he felt the show might have potential, but felt the pilot was for the most part a "near knockoff" of The Office. Likewise, Paige Wiser of the Chicago Sun-Times said "so far it's a pale Xerox of the paper company", although she said "there are lots of funny little moments that could add up to a great series." Robert Bianco said the episode was not funny, and the way in which the scripts and supporting cast ridicule and ignore the Leslie character leaves a "sour whiff of gratuitous cruelty." He also called the pilot unoriginal and described it as "a style in search of a show," despite Poehler's likability. Similarly, Rob Owen of the Pittsburgh Post-Gazette said, "Watching Poehler's pathetic character have her dreams stomped on by apathetic bureaucrats is off-putting, more so than Michael Scott's obliviousness," although Owen said the Ansari character was amusing.

Philadelphia Inquirer television critic Jonathan Storm strongly criticized the show, calling it a flat, "miscast mess" with serious structural problems. Storm also said the Leslie character lacked energy and Poehler was playing the part against her comedic strengths. Tom Shales of The Washington Post said, "Poehler's show unfortunately isn't worthy of her. It's dry and hesitant when one longs for it to be raucous and madcap." David Hinckley of New York Daily News said the show was not funny enough to deserve Poehler's comedic talents, and compared the dialogue to a Saturday Night Live sketch that he said could not sustain a whole sitcom. New York Post television critic Linda Stasi said the pilot lacked laughs and was so similar to The Office that "it's starting to look like a one-trick pony outfit that's gonna keep dressing that horse up in new saddles, hoping that no one will guess it's been around the track so many times, it's worn a ditch in the dirt." The pilot episode premiered in Australia on Channel Seven on December 1, 2009, when episodes from the critically acclaimed second season were already playing in the United States. Sacha Moritorisz of The Sydney Morning Herald said of the episode, "To be frank, tonight's premiere is weak. But the potential is obvious and word from the US is that it gets much better."

== Home media ==
The pilot episode, along with the five other first-season episodes of Parks and Recreation, was released on a one-disc DVD set in the United States on September 8, 2009. The DVD included cast and crew commentary tracks for each episode, as well as about 30 minutes of deleted scenes. The deleted scenes included on the DVD were originally featured on the official Parks and Recreation website after the episode aired. In one of them, Tom talks about changing his name because he thought it sounded too foreign for politics, although he admits this was not a problem for U.S. president Barack Obama. The scene was eventually worked into the second-season episode, "The Stakeout".
