= Pawnee (Parks and Recreation) =

Fictional town

- Parks and Recreation location
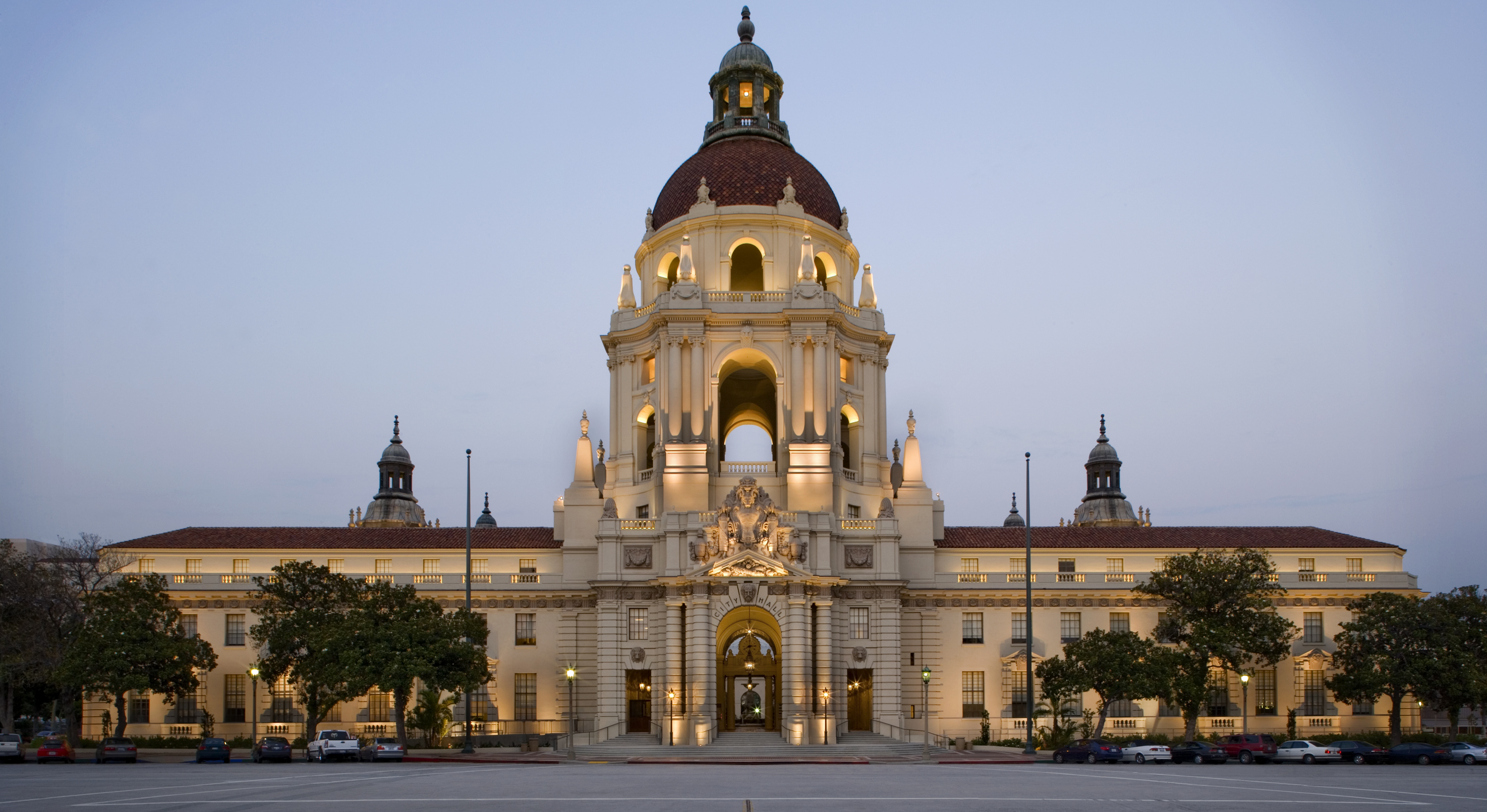
- Exterior of the Pasadena City Hall in Pasadena, California which is portrayed as Pawnee's City Hall
- First appearance: "Pilot" (2009)
- Last appearance: "A Parks and Recreation Special" (2020)
- Created by: Greg Daniels and Michael Schur
- Genre: Television series

In-universe information
- Type: City
- Location: Indiana, United States
- Locations: City Hall, Ramsett Park, JJ's Diner, The Bulge
- Characters: Leslie Knope; Ann Perkins; Chris Traeger; Ron Swanson; Tom Haverford; April Ludgate; Ben Wyatt; Andy Dwyer; Jerry Gergich; Donna Meagle; Jean-Ralphio Saperstein; Mark Brendanawicz

Pawnee (/pɔː.ˈniː/, paw-NEE) is a fictional town located in the state of Indiana in which the NBC comedy series Parks and Recreation is set. Since the show's start in 2009, the city's “colorful” history and inhabitants have been the joke or focal point for many episodes.

== Overview ==
=== History ===
Pawnee's fictional history begins with its founding in 1817, which was very shortly followed by the driving of the Native American Wamapoke tribe from the land. The town is depicted as having an extensive history of misogynistic and racial abuse, particularly towards the Wamapoke people, which it celebrates in various murals on the walls at City Hall.

=== Demographics ===
==== Population ====
Pawnee is depicted as a typical mid-sized city in south central Indiana, located in the fictional "Wamapoke County" about 90 miles from Indianapolis. Dialogue from the show and other officially licensed material suggest a population in the range of 60,000 to a little over 80,000. (Note: Pawnee is said to be the seventh-largest municipality in Indiana. This would put its population between 80,294 and 80,405, the populations of the real ranking sixth and seventh largest cities in Indiana, Bloomington and Gary. However, Pawnee's population has also been described as between 50,000 and 70,000. Per the book Pawnee: The Greatest Town in America, the town is "roughly the same size as Bismarck, North Dakota" — which had a population of 73,622 as of the 2020 United States Census. As of the 2020 Census, Pawnee had a population of 79,218 according to NBC's fictional Pawnee website.)

Pawnee's twin town is Eagleton, Indiana, a smaller but wealthier adjacent community. Eagleton was founded by Pawnee's richest original settlers, who moved uphill shortly after Pawnee's establishment to found their own town. A mutual dislike between the communities has festered ever since. However, in "The Pawnee-Eagleton Tip Off Classic", due to Eagleton's impending bankruptcy (caused by overspending on luxurious amenities for Eagleton residents), Eagleton is dissolved and incorporated into Pawnee.

The town is shown to have many flaws and problems, including a raccoon infestation and an obesity crisis, the latter being mainly the result of the town's major employer being a candy company called "Sweetums". The populace are generally unsophisticated but have a high degree of civic engagement. Over the course of the series, in part due to the actions of Leslie Knope, the city's Deputy Director of the Parks and Recreation department, and her associates, the town's fortunes improve and Pawnee becomes a more desirable place to live.

=== Government ===
==== Local ====
Like many small and medium-sized American cities Pawnee uses a council–manager government system, with several departments serving under a strong city council and a mostly ceremonial mayor, with a city manager running the town's day-to-day operations. Parks and Recreation focuses on the local government of Pawnee, in particular the eponymous department.

Several of the main characters occupy significant roles in the local government. Chris Traeger is city manager in seasons three through six with Ben Wyatt as his deputy in seasons three and four. Wyatt succeeds Traeger as city manager until he is elected as the district's House representative. Ron Swanson is Director of the Parks and Recreation department for most of the series' run with main protagonist Leslie Knope as his deputy. Knope is elected to the City Council in the fourth season but is recalled in the sixth season.

Walter Gunderson (portrayed by Bill Murray) became mayor of Pawnee in 1994, according to the book Pawnee: The Greatest Town in America, and held the office until his death in the last season. After an exhaustive search for an interim mayor, Jerry Gergich assumed the office and was then elected to ten consecutive terms. Although the mayor of Pawnee exercises a fair amount of personal influence within the city, the office itself is largely ceremonial.

At the end of the second season, Pawnee had a serious budget crisis that eventually led to a temporary shutdown of the government. This storyline was inspired by the real-life Great Recession. The third season opened with the budget of every department being slashed.

==== National ====
Pawnee is noted as being in Indiana's 10th congressional district, which in reality has been obsolete since 2003. In the May 2020 special episode of the series, Congressman and Pawnee resident Ben Wyatt is shown to be representing the 9th congressional district.

=== Legislation ===
In the show a number of Pawnee's laws are mentioned.

==== Leslie Knope's ====
Leslie Knope introduces a number of bills as a councillor that are successfully passed into law. These include:

- Sugar Tax: In the episode "Soda Tax" (Season 5: Episode 2) Knope introduces a bill to impose a tax on sugary drinks in Pawnee. This passes 3 - 2.
- Fun in the Sun Act: In the episode "How a Bill Becomes a Law" (Season 5: Episode 3) Leslie introduces the Fun in the Sun Bill the successful bill extends Swimming Pool opening times.

==== Prior to Leslie Knope's election victory ====
- Election Law: In the episode "Win, Lose, or Draw" (Season 4: Episode 22) it is revealed that Pawnee has a law that if there is a tie in an election between a male and female candidate then the male candidate is chosen as the victor and the female candidate goes to prison. The election official states that if Leslie does draw and takes the law to court she probably could get it revoked.
- Abstinence-only sex education: In the episode "Sex Education" (Season 5: Episode 4) it is revealed that Pawnee has an abstinence-only sex education policy. Convinced by her friend Ann Perkins, Leslie tries to call for an end to the policy, however a poll shows that 85% of Pawneeans support the policy.
- Ted Party Day: In the episode "Article Two" (Season 5: Episode 19), Leslie reads that Article 2, Section 2 of the town charter says, "Be it decreed: should the taxation of tea rise to an unacceptable level, citizens shall dump Ted into Ramsett Lake". The handwriting of the charter causes the intended "tea" to look like "Ted", so every year the town throws someone named Ted into Ramsett Lake to celebrate the mistake.
- Citizen Filibuster: Also in the episode "Article Two", it is shown that Article 3, Section 7 of the town charter allows for a citizen filibuster. If a citizen stands in front of the city council and refuses to yield their time, the council is prohibited from voting on a proposed bill. Leslie notably uses this in the episode Filibuster (Season 6: Episode 6) to prevent Councilman Jamm's bill restricting who can vote in Pawnee elections.

==== Repealed ====
These is some legislation that has been repealed in Pawnee:

- Native American Dancing and Smell Ban: In the episode "Two Parties" (Season 5: Episode 10), Leslie mentions that in 1951 a discrimination law against the Wamapoke was passed banning Native American dancing and smelling like a Native American. Leslie indicates that it has since been repealed, yet she does not mention when exactly.
- Laws repealed by Leslie Knope: In the episode "Article Two" (Season 5: Episode 19), it is revealed that the town charter allows any white citizen to seize Indian property for 25 cents. This is one of the over 100 antiquated laws city council repeals in the same episode. Others include Article 7, Section 3 of the town charter (which defines buffalo meat as acceptable currency), an undated law specifying all menstruating women must be confined to their bathtubs, and an 1868 Pawnee statute which says if a woman raises her voice to a landowning male the man may crack an egg on her face.

== Notable locations ==
- City Hall, sometimes referred to as Pioneer Hall in earlier seasons, is the primary setting for the series. It contains the Parks and Recreation Department, as well as other departments and offices such as the Council Chambers and the City Manager's office.
  - The Fourth Floor of City Hall is the "creepy" floor that hosts the Department of Motor Vehicles, divorce filings, and probation offices.
  - The Third Floor of City Hall is refurbished by Ron Swanson, and Leslie later moves the location of her job in the National Park Service there.
- Lot 48, originally a pit behind Ann Perkins house, was turned into a park after Andy Dwyer, Perkins' boyfriend at the time, fell in and broke his legs.
- The Snakehole Lounge, a sleazy nightclub where many after-work functions are held. Donna Meagle is an investor, as was Tom Haverford before Chris Traeger made him sell his shares, to eliminate a conflict of interest.
- JJ's Diner, the unofficial meeting place for people in the government. It is Leslie Knope's favorite eatery, where she always orders waffles.
- The Bulge, a gay club. Leslie Knope became an inadvertent hero of its patrons when she—with April Ludgate—"married" two penguins at the Pawnee Zoo, not realizing they were both male.
- Food and Stuff, a store frequented by Ron Swanson, where he purchases meat and miscellaneous items ("All of my food, and most of my stuff"), such as mufflers.
- The Glitter Factory, a strip club that Tom frequents. They serve an all-you-can-eat breakfast buffet that Ron Swanson appreciates.
- Turnbill Mansion, the site of a historic wedding between a Pawnee Native American man and white woman, which became a "bloodbath" when knowledge of the wedding became public; the sole survivors were two horses.
- Paunch Burger, a local burger chain, known for their meat-filled sandwiches and absurd soft drink size choices.
- Rent-A-Swag , a teen clothing rental service where parents can rent their kids' clothing from a swanky wardrobe formerly owned by Tom Haverford.
- Tom's Bistro, an upscale restaurant venue founded by Tom Haverford after he sold the rights to Rent-A-Swag.
- Sweetums Factory, a candy and junk food manufacturer owned by the wealthy Newport family.
- Ramsett Park, Pawnee's most-visited park and home of Ramsett Lake.

== Reception ==
The city of Pawnee has received critical acclaim. Several critics have noted that the city has become the show's secret weapon.

For example, Hillary Busis of Entertainment Weekly wrote:

"the show wouldn't work nearly as well if it were set in a less wonderfully quirky place", and said that "some of the show's funniest moments come when the extreme weirdness of its setting is revealed — when, say, Leslie explains what's going on in one of City Hall's numerous, horrifically offensive murals, or when she dispatches ridiculous bits of Pawnee history. ('For a brief time in the '70s, our town was taken over by a cult.') And then there's how absurdly cosmopolitan Pawnee is: Why does this blip on the map have its own tabloid news show, zoo, beauty pageant, periodicals, and thriving nightlife scene? Pawnee is more than a setting — it's a rich comic universe, like Springfield."

== Production ==
Despite Pawnee's Indiana setting, the show was mostly filmed in Southern California. The exterior of the Pawnee government building, and several of the hallway scenes, were shot at Pasadena City Hall.

For the maps of Pawnee in the show, the producers have used slightly modified maps of Christchurch, New Zealand and Muncie, Indiana.

== Merchandise ==
Since the series' premiere, NBC has sold merchandise for the town of Pawnee. Shirts, sweatshirts, mugs, and other items were sold with the seal of Pawnee, as were shirts with Pawnee's slogan, "First in Friendship, Fourth in Obesity".

In the episode "Born & Raised," Leslie writes a book about the town, titled Pawnee: The Greatest Town in America. After the episode aired, NBC released an actual eponymous book, filled with information about the fictional town. The author is listed as Leslie Knope, although it was actually written by show writer Nate DiMeo. In 2012, it was nominated for the Thurber Prize for American Humor.
