= Mark Brendanawicz =

US TV sitcom character, created 2009

- Parks and Recreation character
- Paul Schneider as Mark Brendanawicz
- First appearance: "Pilot"; April 9, 2009
- Last appearance: "Freddy Spaghetti"; May 20, 2010
- Portrayed by: Paul Schneider

In-universe information
- Occupation: City planner (former); Architect For Norton Construction (current)
- Significant others: Ann Perkins (ex-girlfriend); Leslie Knope (former lover); Shauna Malwae-Tweep (former lover)

Mark Brendanawicz /brɛnˈdænəwɪts/ is a fictional character in the NBC comedy series Parks and Recreation. He is the city planner for Pawnee, Indiana, as well as Leslie Knope's colleague and one of Ann Perkins' ex-boyfriends. He is portrayed by Paul Schneider, who left Parks and Recreation at the end of the second season; despite the producers' publicly stated plans to the contrary, Schneider did not reprise the role in any later seasons, and the show made no references to the character after his departure.

== Background ==
Mark Brendanawicz was a city planner of Polish descent with the Pawnee municipal government. When he studied city planning in college, Mark was optimistic about the field and dreamed of designing huge and impressive cities. However, since graduation, Mark learned most of the career largely involved mundane technical issues, such as regulating the sizes of garages and proposed construction additions to houses. As a result, Mark grew jaded and disillusioned with the career, and became critical of government processes in general.

Mark initially has a self-absorbed personality and engages in romantic flings with multiple women without any sign of seeking a commitment. Mark and Leslie had sex on one occasion and Leslie harbored romantic feelings for the next six years, although Mark does not return the feelings, and in fact did not recollect their night together for several years afterward. In season two, he enters a committed relationship with Ann and even considers marriage before she breaks up with him.

== Storyline ==
=== Season 1 ===
Leslie continues to harbor a crush on Mark, but Mark is not interested in her romantically and spends a long time muddling around before becoming impressed by Leslie's fighting spirit and beginning to help her work on the park project for that reason. Mark agrees to help Leslie in her quest to turn the Lot 48 pit into a park, but he is pragmatic about her chances of success, and warns it has little chance of succeeding. When Leslie seeks his help in dealing with newspaper reporter Shauna Malwae-Tweep, who is planning to write a negative story, Mark makes the situation worse by having sex with her. This angers Leslie, particularly after Mark tells the reporter in confidence that the pit project will never be successful, only to later learn she plans to use that in the story.

One night, while feeling particularly disillusioned and unhappy with the insignificance of his career, Mark makes a halfhearted attempt to flirt with Ann, unaware of Ann's anger over problems with her boyfriend Andy. Mark's advances are quickly and harshly rejected by an irritated Ann as a result. Later that night, Mark and Leslie spend time together at the pit and an intoxicated Mark attempts to kiss her. Not wishing to reconnect with Mark in his drunken state, Leslie rejects his advances, and Mark accidentally falls into the pit and hits his head.

=== Season 2 ===
Following the accident at the pit, Mark has reevaluated his life, become less jaded, and abandoned his promiscuous lifestyle. He and Ann develop a romantic interest in each other after she nursed him back to health at the hospital while he recovered. They start dating after Leslie assures Ann she is fine with the pairing and appears to have moved on from her long-standing infatuation with Mark. Throughout, Mark has to fend off Andy's juvenile insults and attempts to mess with his and Ann's relationship, but also contends with some jealousy when Ann tries to "save" her close friend Justin as a potential future mate. After several months of dating, Mark reveals to Leslie he wants to propose to Ann, but at the same time, Ann has increasingly begun to realize her relationship with Mark doesn't satisfy her. Leslie has to stop Mark from embarrassing himself during the Diabetes Telethon and Ann breaks up with him.

Mark and Ann have breakfast together one last time to discuss the end of their relationship. Mark admits to being surprised as they never even fought with each other. Ann explains she simply didn't feel any passion or excitement in their relationship and adds that Mark overstated them as a couple because he had never had a relationship that lasted for months before. When the Pawnee government is shut down, Mark decides to take an offered buyout and leave his city hall position for a private-sector job with a construction company, causing Leslie to angrily call him "Mark Brendanaquits." She later apologizes to him for lashing out and they share a tender goodbye before Mark gives her design plans he drafted for the park she wants to build in place of the pit.

== Development ==
When Mark Brendanawicz was originally conceived, it was anticipated that the character would eventually start to appear infrequently in Parks and Recreation, switching between his city planner job and work in the private sector. Series co-creator Michael Schur said this is because real-life city planners often move back and forth between different jobs. Schur said Mark is partially based on a real-life city planner who eventually got tired of the bureaucratic red tape of government and moved into the private sector, but eventually moved back to government when he was tired of the negative corporate environment. When Paul Schneider was cast as Mark, Schur told him the character might eventually leave Pawnee government and come back working for a different company, then keep moving back and forth in such a manner. Schur said, "It's not something you usually do on TV shows but we thought it was a good way to illustrate both the positive and negative aspects of working for a government. It was one of the first things we talked about with [Schneider]."

Elements of the character were designed based on advice by Scott Albright, a California city planner who worked as a consultant with Parks and Recreation. The discrepancy between Mark's optimism in college and pragmatism after encountering the real world were inspired by feedback Albright provided about the urban planning profession. The Mark character underwent major changes after receiving feedback at press tours and focus group screenings. In the original pilot episode script, Mark was portrayed as slightly less likable than the final character became. For example, in the final episode Mark asked Ron Swanson to green-light the park project to help Leslie, but in the original script, he did so only because he was attracted to Ann and wanted another excuse to keep seeing her. During the first season, Paul Schneider said he was insecure about playing Mark in early episodes because he was still trying to figure out and understand the motivations of his character.

== Departure ==
It was announced in March 2010 that Schneider would leave Parks and Recreation at the end of the second season. Schur claimed the decision was a combination of the original conception of the character switching between the government and the private sector, as well as Schneider's increasing success in such independent films as Bright Star. In the initial announcement, Schur claimed that both the producers and Schneider were interested in having Schneider return for guest appearances in the future, including in season three. Schur said at the time: "He's going to remain in the world of the show in a way that not only allows but hopefully demands that he'll reenter it. He's not going to be killed in some weird accident."

Despite Schur's statements, Schneider did not make a return appearance on Parks and Recreation, and the show made no reference to Mark Brendanawicz after Schneider's departure. During the fifth season episode "Halloween Surprise", when Ann Perkins extensively reminisces about her past romances, she does not mention Mark, even though they dated for almost all of the second season. In addition, although almost every major and minor supporting character that ever appeared on Parks and Recreation made at least a cameo appearance in the seventh and final season, Mark was not one of them, nor was he shown in any clips in a flashback montage during the series' final episode. Shortly after the seventh season was announced, Schneider stated that he was not interested in returning to the show and had not been contacted about it. Mark also was not included in the special COVID-19 set reunion episode that aired in 2020.
