= April Ludgate =

Fictional character in Parks and Recreation

April Ludgate-Dwyer
- Parks and Recreation character
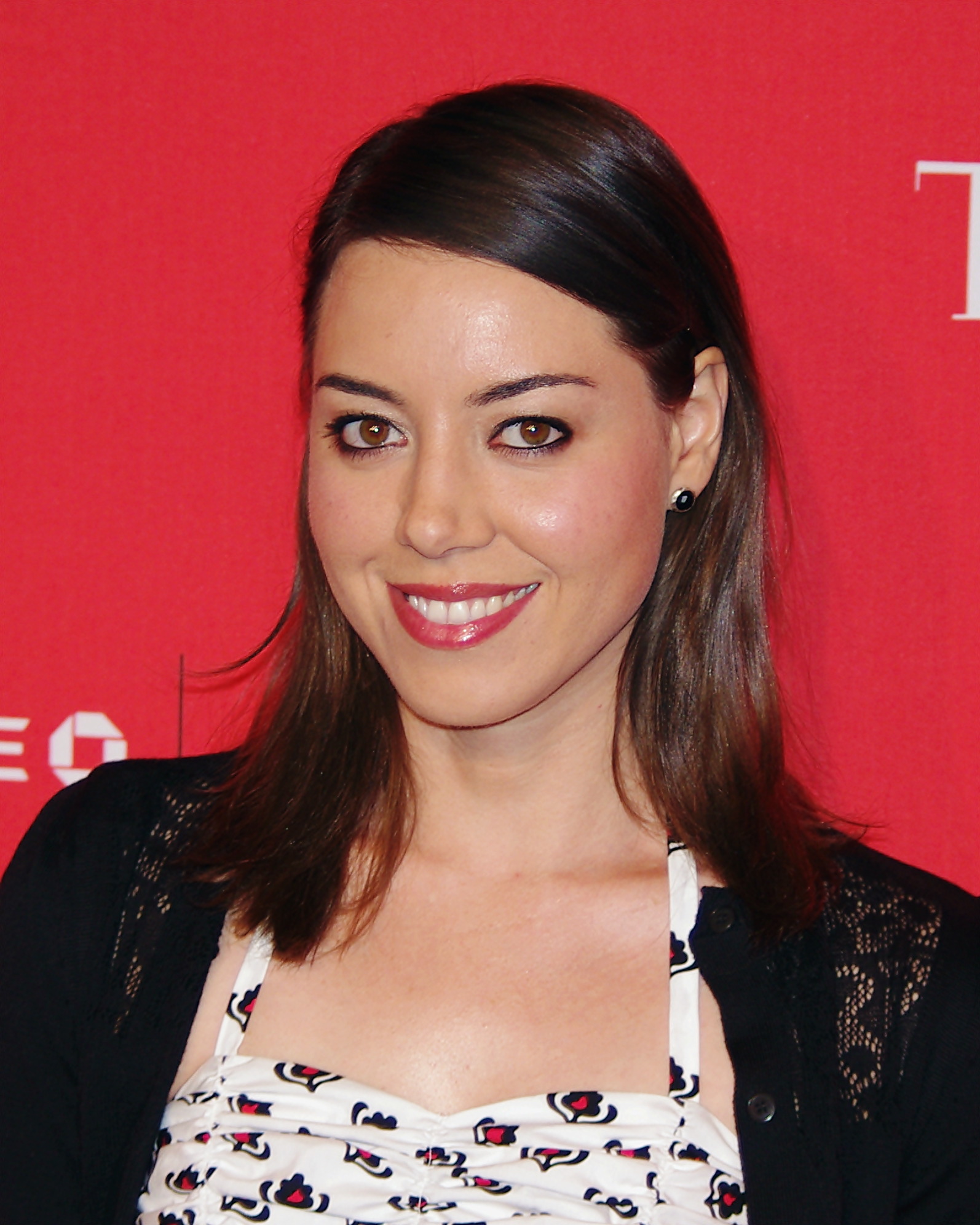
- Aubrey Plaza played April Ludgate
- First appearance: "Pilot" (2009)
- Last appearance: "A Parks and Recreation Special" (2020)
- Portrayed by: Aubrey Plaza

In-universe information
- Aliases: Janet Snakehole; Currently Doing That; Judy Hitler; Satan's Niece; April Swanson; April Karate
- Gender: Female
- Occupation: Intern, City of Pawnee Parks and Recreation (former); Assistant to Ron Swanson (former); Assistant to Chris Traeger (former); Assistant to Ben Wyatt during a congressional campaign Deputy Director of Pawnee Animal Control (former); Executive Director of Regional Affairs at the National Park Service: Midwest Branch (former); Employee at American Service Foundation
- Family: Larry Ludgate (father); Rita Ludgate (mother); Natalie Ludgate (sister)
- Spouse: Andy Dwyer (m. 2011)
- Significant others: Derek (ex-boyfriend); Eduardo (ex-boyfriend)
- Children: Burt Snakehole Ludgate Karate Dracula Macklin Demon Jack-o-Lantern "Jack" Dwyer (b. October 31, 2023); Unnamed Child (b. 2025-26)
- Nationality: American

April Roberta Ludgate-Dwyer (née Ludgate) is a fictional character in the NBC political satire mockumentary sitcom Parks and Recreation. She is portrayed by Aubrey Plaza. She is first seen as an apathetic college student working as an intern in the Pawnee Department of Parks and Recreation, before being hired as Ron Swanson's assistant. She later becomes the Deputy Director of Animal Control. Plaza's portrayal received critical praise, and April was one of the series' breakout characters.

== Background ==
April Ludgate is a college student who starts out working as an intern in the Pawnee parks and recreation department. She speaks in a blasé, deadpan manner, and appears bored by everything and everyone. She lives with her parents, Larry (John Ellison Conlee) and Rita (Terri Hoyos), who, in direct contrast to their daughter, are warm and friendly. April is of English and Puerto Rican descent, which she says explains her "lively and colorful" personality, and is fluent in Spanish. She has a younger sister, Natalie (Minni Jo Mazzola), who is similarly bored and apathetic. Her family calls her "Zuzu".

April is extremely uninterested in her job, regularly napping at her desk and texting constantly, and acts very dry and sarcastic around her co-workers. She was assigned the internship because she overslept on intern sign-up date, which she blamed on her sister Natalie for not waking her up. Her favorite band is Neutral Milk Hotel.

April was responsible for uploading the staff bios onto the Pawnee parks and recreation site, and she jokingly made a fictional bio for herself that reads as follows:

April Ludgate-Dwyer was born in Björk’s house in Iceland and grew up on Easter Island, where her parents were giant stone heads. She has the ability to fire beams of tacos out of her hands and she can turn her legs into tigers. On Sundays, April enjoys reading Family Circus and traveling through time. Her favorite color is greenish-transparent and her favorite movie is the one you just watched. April is in charge of uploading the staff bios to the website, and no one has checked over her work.

While picking spirit dogs in season six, her coworker Donna Meagle (Retta) described her as follows:

"You're beautiful, yet cold and aloof. You pride yourself on being a loner. You do not obey - you choose to cooperate. And when you stop baring your fangs to pick a mate, it's for life. And you're fiercely loyal to your pack. Which makes you a rare black Siberian husky."

== Character arc ==
=== Season 1 ===
April starts as a 19-year-old intern at the parks department who is completely uninterested in her job and often annoyed by her fellow parks department workers. For the first two seasons, her boyfriend is Derek (Blake Lee), who is openly bisexual and who simultaneously dates an openly gay college student named Ben (Josh Duvendeck), whom April dislikes. (Aubrey Plaza herself came up with the idea of her character's boyfriend being bisexual and her boyfriend dating another man.)

=== Season 2 ===
Although still dating her bisexual boyfriend, Derek, who is still dating his boyfriend, Ben, April begins to develop a crush on Andy Dwyer (Chris Pratt), the ex-boyfriend of Ann Perkins (Rashida Jones). Andy is able to make April smile, which is something she rarely does. April flirts with Andy and even convinces Andy to let her give him hickeys on his neck in order to make Ann jealous, but Andy nevertheless remains unaware of her feelings toward him. In order to remain close to Andy, April volunteers to work as Ron's assistant, ending her time as an intern and establishing a full-time position at the Pawnee town hall. April finally breaks up with Derek after he makes fun of Andy and gives her a hard time about spending too much time with him. Toward the end of the season Andy and April's relationship begins to grow to the point that he begins to reciprocate her feelings but their age difference continues to be a wedge between them. They admit their mutual attraction to each other in the season finale, but she tells him she does not want to get involved with him because he still has feelings for Ann. She changes her mind after he gets into a car accident, and the two kiss for the first time, but she leaves abruptly after he reveals Ann kissed him just two minutes earlier.

=== Season 3 ===
April traveled to Venezuela between seasons but has returned to Pawnee to continue her job at the Parks Dept. and has a new Spanish-speaking Venezuelan boyfriend, Eduardo (Carlo Mendez). April eventually breaks up with Eduardo after he becomes friends with Andy because she was only using Eduardo to make Andy jealous. April tells Andy that for one month he should do for her all of the things she hates doing. After only one day of him doing this, April kisses Andy. Andy and April decide to get married in "April and Andy's Fancy Party" after only one month of dating. Andy had proposed to April the day before the party asking, "What if we got married tomorrow?" to which April replied, "Fine." They were married at their dinner party (which was actually a surprise ceremony) in front of their friends and family. With a great deal of help from new housemate Ben Wyatt (Adam Scott), they have learned, to a limited extent, how to live and act like working adults.

=== Season 4 ===
April becomes a member of Leslie's campaign for City Council as the "youth outreach". April takes over a large portion of Leslie's duties in the Parks and Rec department towards the end of the season to allow Leslie to concentrate on the election. April is shown to somewhat enjoy and excel in this position. She also acquires a mentor in Parks Department Manager Ron Swanson (Nick Offerman), a staunch libertarian who likes her complete indifference to government work. In "Bus Tour", April becomes legally known as April Ludgate-Dwyer.

=== Season 5 ===
April is working as Ben's assistant in Washington, D.C. as he successfully runs a congressional re-election campaign. She actively supports Andy while he tries to get into the Pawnee Police Department. Following her passion for animals, she develops plans to have Lot 48 become a dog park. She reveals that she wants to become a veterinarian and asks Ann to write her a recommendation letter. April becomes Deputy Director of the Animal Control after she suggests it be absorbed into the Parks Department due to its inefficiency.

=== Season 6 ===
At the beginning of Season 6, April is planning on attending veterinary school; however, upon going to the orientation with Ann she realizes it is not what she wants to do. While she supports Andy for having a job away in London, she is very upset while he is away and misses him. She develops a closer relationship with Donna, and they both try to stop Tom Haverford (Aziz Ansari) from leaving the Parks Department by being unhelpful as he searches for a property for his restaurant. However, they later feel guilty, and help him find the perfect place. When Andy returns, she actively supports him on playing music for children, deciding to become his manager. While she pretends to be excited that her old nemesis Ann is leaving Pawnee, the pair share a nostalgic farewell at the Pawnee Commons site in "Ann and Chris". Along with Andy, Tom, and some other Pawnee youths, she comes up with the idea of holding a unity concert celebrating the merger. In the season finale, April has Leslie named a founder of the revamped city of Pawnee and motivates her to convince the National Park Service to move the Midwest Branch to Pawnee, which allows Leslie and Ben to stay. In addition, it is revealed that April and Andy are still happily married in 2017, with April working for Leslie.

=== Season 7 ===
It is 2017 and April laments, as time has passed and she has remained in her government career, she fears she and Andy are becoming ordinary and boring. While driving through the warehouse district, they spot a creepy old house with an equally creepy owner. He tells them it was a place for old factory workers who ended up going mad. They decide to purchase it. When local reporter Joan Callamezzo (Mo Collins) is honored by the mayor, April starts to feel that her life has not been fulfilled yet, and realizes working in the Parks Department really is not her dream job. In "Ms. Ludgate-Dwyer Goes to Washington", April is trying to find a way to tell Leslie that she wants to leave the Parks Department. When she finally tells Leslie, after a bit of reluctance, Leslie decides to help her. Leslie takes April to the American Service Foundation, which helps determine potential occupations for job-seekers. After April's meeting, April tells Leslie that she would like to work at the Foundation itself. April and Andy decide to relocate to Washington, D.C., when April gets an offer to work for the Foundation. However, she feels guilty for making Andy give up "the best job he's ever had" as children's show host Johnny Karate. Andy assures her that she is the best thing that ever happened to him and after all the support she has given him, she deserves his support in her search for happiness.

In a series of flash-forwards in the final episode, April and Andy ask Leslie and Ben for advice regarding the prospect of having children, which Andy very much wants but April does not. They ultimately decide to have children, and their son Jack (short for Burt Snakehole Ludgate Karate Dracula Macklin Demon Jack-o-Lantern) is born on Halloween 2023. By 2025, the couple is expecting their second child.

== Development ==
While Plaza was in Los Angeles for a film, casting director Allison Jones, who cast the film Plaza was working on, asked her if she wanted to attend some meetings in the city. She set a meeting with series creators Greg Daniels and Michael Schur, who were developing the pilot. According to Schur, Jones told him, "I just met the weirdest, funniest girl I've ever met in my life, you should meet with her." Schur said that when they met with her he was taken off guard by her quiet and seemingly disinterested personality there that he felt uncomfortable, spending the meeting trying to keep her entertained. He said that, afterward, he and Daniels knew they wanted to cast her on the show. Plaza stated that at the meeting, Daniels asked her about life and what she thought happens when people died and the two had a discussion on the topic. She said that Schur likely found the conversation odd. They told her the idea for the show's pilot and that they were considering giving Amy Poehler's character an assistant that was a doltish blonde. Plaza pitched them instead the character of a smart intern who is at the department only for college credit and does not care about the job, which Plaza thought would be an interesting, comedic contrast with Poehler's character. They liked the concept for the character and created April Ludgate. Plaza, who said that in real life she was like Poehler's earnestly hard-working character, took inspiration from her younger sister for April's apathetic disposition.

Plaza later introduced the idea of April and Andy Dwyer's relationship, which stemmed from the season one finale where she improvised the line "I get it" in response to Andy telling his coworkers about his band's music and the rest of them not understanding it. Plaza thought April by that point would be attracted and responsive to Andy. Plaza also contributed other character improvisations and scene ideas to the show.

Allison P. Davis, interviewing Plaza for The Cut, said Plaza was not as deadpan and sarcastic as the famous character. Plaza said that fans often approach her hoping for the sarcasm and hostility of April Ludgate, which Plaza would sometimes oblige, but that she would really like to move beyond the character.

== Reception ==
April and Plaza's portrayal received critical praise, and April was considered a breakout character. The New York Times said that "All the characters were funny and well imagined, but Aubrey Plaza was particularly memorable as April". On the character's cultural impact, Vanity Fair regarded April as "an avatar for millennial jadedness and skepticism". The Daily Beast wrote that Plaza was "one of the greatest elements" of the series, and beyond comedic delivery she also brought "pathos" to the character.

== 2023 Saturday Night Live appearance ==
Plaza hosted Saturday Night Live on January 21, 2023, and reprised the character on a Weekend Update skit alongside Amy Poehler as Leslie Knope, in which April talks about young people getting involved in local government.
