= Donna Meagle =

US TV sitcom character, created 2009

- Parks and Recreation character
- Retta as Donna Meagle
- First appearance: "Pilot" (2009)
- Last appearance: "A Parks and Recreation Special" (2020)
- Portrayed by: Retta

In-universe information
- Gender: Female
- Occupation: Office Manager in the Department of Parks and Recreation of Pawnee (seasons 1-6); Realtor (season 7)
- Family: George (brother); Lavondrius (brother); Ginuwine (cousin)
- Spouse: Joe (husband)

Donna Marie Meagle is a fictional character in the NBC comedy Parks and Recreation. She is portrayed by Retta and has appeared in the show since the pilot. For the first two seasons of the show she appeared as a recurring character; she became a regular in the third season.

== Background ==
Donna (Retta) is an employee of the Parks and Recreation Department. She first speaks in the Season 1 Episode, "Boys' Club". She is one of the people who volunteered to help Leslie Knope (Amy Poehler) run her successful campaign for City Council. She once unwittingly donated money to David Duke, a former Grand Wizard of the Knights of the Ku Klux Klan, because she received a campaign phone call promising lower taxes. Additionally, she is a part investor in The Snakehole Lounge, a night club in Pawnee. Donna also has a storied past with men as she casually mentions that all of her ex-boyfriends have tried to hack her email. She claims to have done "very well" in South America, after several men visiting from Venezuela hit on her. She cares very deeply for her Mercedes-Benz ML. At their wedding, her husband Joe says that he learns something new about her every day, stating he recently found out Pearl Jam wrote their album Vitalogy about her.

== Personal life ==
Though the show does not follow her romantic life as much as those of the other characters, Donna has the most active dating life of any character on the show with a variety of suitors. In the season 6 episode "One in 8,000" Donna overcomes her misgivings about becoming "boring" and settles into a happy relationship with former partner Joe. The two marry in the season 7 episode "Donna & Joe".

Donna has alluded to having a successful and financially stable life by mentioning owning numerous properties outside of Pawnee. She is not close to her family, stating that "the Meagles are a cold people", and has a particularly strained relationship with her brother Lavondrius. Her cousin is Ginuwine.

== Critical reception ==
During a stand-up comedy performance at the University of Illinois at Springfield, Retta said the acting job on the show was stressful as it was unclear how long the show would stay on the air. Alan Sepinwall, television columnist with The Star-Ledger, said that season two episodes of Parks and Recreation have afforded more personality and funnier jokes to Donna and other minor characters.
