= Ron Swanson =

Parks and Recreation character

Ron Ulysses Swanson
- Parks and Recreation character
- Nick Offerman as Ron Swanson
- First appearance: "Pilot"; Parks and Recreation; April 9, 2009
- Last appearance: "A Parks and Recreation Special"; April 30, 2020
- Created by: Greg Daniels; Michael Schur
- Portrayed by: Nick Offerman

In-universe information
- Aliases: Duke Silver; The Steak Man; Man
- Occupation: Director of the Pawnee City Department of Parks and Recreation (seasons 1–6); Owner and chairman of Very Good Building and Development Company (season 7); Part owner of the Lagavulin Distillery (One Last Ride); Superintendent of Pawnee National Park (One Last Ride)
- Affiliation: Libertarian
- Family: Tammy "Zero" Swanson (mother); Don Swanson (brother)
- Spouses: Tammy "One" Swanson (divorced); Tammy "Two" Swanson (divorced/annulled each once); Diane Lewis
- Children: John Swanson (son); Zoey Lewis (step-daughter); Ivy Lewis (step-daughter)
- Nationality: American

Ronald Ulysses Swanson is a fictional character portrayed by Nick Offerman in the political satire sitcom Parks and Recreation. The character was created by Michael Schur and Greg Daniels with inspiration from a real-life Libertarian elected official. Offerman provided creative input, and aspects of his own personality were folded into the character. Despite the creators' intentions, NBC was initially reluctant to cast Offerman in the role, but the network finally agreed, five months later.

Swanson is the director of the Parks and Recreation Department of Pawnee, Indiana, and the immediate superior of the deputy director Leslie Knope (Amy Poehler). He has a deadpan personality and actively works to make the government less effective. He despises interacting with the public and claims to not be interested in the lives of those around him, but he is shown to care for his colleagues and has particularly strong respect for Knope. He secretly performs as a saxophonist named Duke Silver and fronts a band called the Duke Silver Trio.

Offerman's portrayal of Swanson has received widespread critical acclaim. The character developed a cult following and is widely considered the breakout character of the series. He was described by some critics as one of the best characters in a comedy television series in decades, and his platonic relationship with Knope has been compared to that of Mary Richards and Lou Grant in The Mary Tyler Moore Show. For his performance as Swanson, Offerman won the TCA Award for Individual Achievement in Comedy.

== Development ==
Ron Swanson was created by Parks and Recreation creators Greg Daniels and Michael Schur. While researching for the show in Burbank, Schur met a Libertarian elected official who favored as little government interference as possible, becoming an inspiration for some of Swanson's traits. Swanson is also partially inspired by political appointees of former president George W. Bush who were perceived to be opposed to the branch of government they were overseeing.

Nick Offerman had some input into the character's creation, and many aspects of the character were based on the actor's, such as the character's deadpan personality, which Offerman cultivated when he was a lector. Other aspects included his woodworking abilities and experience in stage combat and kabuki. Like Swanson, Offerman played the saxophone, but the writers were not aware of the fact when developing the character. According to Offerman, NBC was initially reluctant to cast him as the character, despite Schur and Daniels' intentions. After the creators refused to find other actors for the role, the network finally acquiesced five months later. Ron became more heavily involved in Parks and Recreation's storylines during the second season, and Offerman largely credited Schur with the development of the character.

Ron's second ex-wife, Tammy, was played by Offerman's wife, actress and comedian Megan Mullally. Ron's hatred towards Tammy was established early in the creation of the character, and it was Schur who conceived the idea of casting Mullally, to which Offerman responded positively.

== Character role ==
In the first six seasons of Parks and Recreation, Swanson served as the director of the Pawnee City Department of Parks and Recreation, a role he had for six years when the series began. In the first eleven episodes of the seventh season, in which the show is fast-forwarded to 2017, it is revealed that he had quit his job two years prior and started his own company called the Very Good Building Company. In the last two episodes of the seventh season, which partly takes place in the future, Swanson had resigned from the company, and Knope in turn made him the superintendent of Pawnee National Park.

Offerman appeared in all 125 episodes of the show except for "Beauty Pageant". He reprised his role in a 2020 special featuring the original cast, titled A Parks and Recreation Special, which served as a fundraiser for Feeding America's COVID-19 Response Fund.

=== Personality ===
Swanson is known for his deadpan personality and adherence to many stereotypically masculine traits, like supposedly only having cried two times. Being an extremely private person, he goes so far as to redact his birthday from government documents to keep others from holding parties for him. He enjoys outdoor activities such as hunting, fishing, camping, and woodworking, as well as eating breakfast foods and red meat. He is also able to drink heavily without getting hungover and can chug an entire bottle of alcoholic beverages in one go. Swanson lacks awareness about popular culture; in "Andy and April's Fancy Party", he only recognizes Julia Roberts as the "toothy gal from Mystic Pizza."

=== Director of the Parks and Recreation Department ===
As director of the Parks and Recreation Department, Swanson puts almost no effort into his job and purposely hires people who are bad at their jobs, like April Ludgate (Aubrey Plaza) and Andy Dwyer (Chris Pratt), so they will slow down the government. He believes that parks should be privatized and run entirely by corporations for profit, and thus originally did not intend to help the deputy director Leslie Knope (Amy Poehler) with the park project. He is a strong advocate for small government and believes that the government model should be abolished. He also despises talking to members of the public, choosing to mount a shotgun on his desk to scare people away.

He occasionally demonstrates himself as a good manager; although he has claimed to not be interested in the lives of those around him, he cares for them more than he does himself. In "The Bubble", after Chris Traeger (Rob Lowe) enacts numerous changes to the parks department that Swanson thought did not play to his staff's strengths, he makes a deal for Traeger to undo the changes after he has spent one more week interacting with the public. Swanson develops an avuncular relationship with Andy Dwyer, and pays for Dwyer's college course when he cannot afford it in "Smallest Park". Despite sharing opposite views, Swanson gets along well with Knope, and the two share a strong mutual respect. Swanson has stood up for Knope on multiple occasions, such as in "Freddy Spaghetti", where upon learning about the auditors' plan to fire Knope, he refuses and offers her his job instead.

=== Personal life ===
Before the start of Parks and Recreation, Ron had two ex-wives, both of whom were named Tammy. Ron despises and fears both of his ex-wives, and they are among the few people who can break his usually unwavering stoicism. Nevertheless, Ron shares an extremely passionate sexual connection with his second ex-wife (Megan Mullally). In "How a Bill Becomes a Law", Swanson meets Diane Lewis (Lucy Lawless), the vice principal of a middle school. In the season six series premiere "London", it is revealed that Lewis is pregnant, and the pair gets married. Lewis subsequently gave birth to a baby boy named John, as revealed in "The Wall".

Swanson secretly performs at out-of-town bars as a saxophonist named Duke Silver, which he keeps secret from his colleagues in Pawnee. He fronts a band called the Duke Silver Trio and has released such albums as Memories of Now, Smooth as Silver, and Hi Ho, Duke. His music is especially popular with older women, who find Duke Silver attractive. Eventually, in the two-part season six finale "Moving Up", he publicly reveals his secret identity at the Unity Concert.

In a flash-forward, during a social call by Leslie and Ben where they are catching up, Ron admits to Ben that he finally took some of Ben's advice, sold some of his gold to "diversify his portfolio" and purchased a 51% controlling stake in the Lagavulin single malt Scotch whisky distillery on the island of Islay off the coast of Scotland, the same distillery Leslie directed him to in "London, Part 2".

== Reception ==
The character of Ron Swanson received universal acclaim; he developed a cult following and is widely considered the show's breakout character. Joel Keller of TV Squad called Swanson "one of the more inspired sitcom characters of the last decade", and Geoff Berkshire of Variety said that the character would "go down in TV history as one of the all-time comedy greats". Gail Pennington of the St. Louis Post-Dispatch called Nick Offerman "the funniest guy on TV". During the second season, Alan Sepinwall called Swanson "easily the show's best creation so far", and during the third season he wrote, "Swanson being both awesome and hilarious is something Nick Offerman and these writers can do in their sleep by now." Sal Basile of UGO Networks wrote, "How anyone can make Ron Swanson of Parks and Recreation likable is beyond us, but Offerman does it effortlessly. Before we knew it we couldn't wait to see Swanson's reactions to the slightest of problems." While initially critical of the character at the start of the show, by the second season, Matt Fowler of IGN thought that the character had improved and became "an absolute stand-out in the series."

Offerman was particularly praised for his subtle minimalism and facial expressions, particularly the use of his eyebrows. Jonah Weiner of Slate said Swanson "has regularly stolen his scenes" and that Offerman has "a gift for understated physical comedy", and Steve Heisler of The A.V. Club said Offerman was not only funny but capable of expressing a surprising range of emotions. The second-season episode "Ron and Tammy", which predominantly featured Ron and his second ex-wife, is widely considered one of the best Parks and Recreation episodes. A quote from Swanson from "The Stakeout": "I was born ready. I'm Ron fucking Swanson," led fans and reviewers to call him "Ron Fucking Swanson." Several reviewers have praised the platonic relationship between Swanson and Knope, which has been compared to that of Mary Richards and Lou Grant in The Mary Tyler Moore Show. Josh Jackson of Paste ranked him No. 2 in his list of the 20 Best Characters of 2011, saying: "In four seasons, Ron has become the standout in a cast of incredible characters, and already seems poised to join the elite list of TV’s greatest comedic characters."

Fans created websites based on him, like "Cats That Look Like Ron Swanson", and after Swanson misunderstood a turkey burger to be "a fried turkey leg inside a grilled hamburger", the food website Eater created and posted a recipe for it. An image of a fake Ron Swanson-themed Ben & Jerry's ice cream was circulated online, to which the company responded positively.

For his performance as Swanson, Nick Offerman received two nominations for a TCA Award for Individual Achievement in Comedy in 2010 and 2011, winning the latter with Ty Burrell of Modern Family. Offerman was also nominated for Best Supporting Actor in a Comedy at Entertainment Weekly's EWwy Awards in 2010. Despite critical success, Offerman never received an Emmy Award nomination for his role. Several reviewers expressed particular surprise that he did not receive a nomination for the 63rd Primetime Emmy Awards in 2011, which many considered the biggest snub of the season. Amy Poehler in particular was outraged by Offerman's snub and said it was "a hot load of bullshit that [Offerman] didn't get nominated." Multiple other actors, including Michelle Forbes and Ty Burrell, stated that they believed Offerman should have been nominated, and Burrell added that Offerman deserved the nomination more than he did.
