= Leslie Knope =

Fictional character from Parks and Recreation

- Parks and Recreation character
- Amy Poehler as Leslie Knope
- First appearance: "Pilot" (2009)
- Last appearance: "A Parks and Recreation Special" (2020)
- Portrayed by: Amy Poehler

In-universe information
- Full name: Leslie Barbara Knope
- Occupation: President and/or First Lady of the United States of America (implied); Governor of Indiana; Deputy Director of Operations at United States Department of the Interior; Regional Director of National Park Service Midwest Region; City Councilor for Pawnee, Indiana (former); Deputy director of the Pawnee City Department of Parks and Recreation (former)
- Affiliation: Democratic (season 7) Independent (during City Council run)
- Family: Marlene Griggs-Knope (mother); Robert Knope (father, deceased)
- Spouse: Ben Wyatt (m. 2013)
- Children: Westley Knope-Wyatt (son); Stephen Knope-Wyatt (son); Sonia Knope-Wyatt (daughter)
- Home: Pawnee, Indiana
- Nationality: American

Leslie Barbara Knope (/ˈnoʊp/ NOHP) is a fictional character portrayed by former SNL cast member Amy Poehler and the main protagonist of the NBC sitcom Parks and Recreation. For most of the show's run, she serves as deputy director of the Parks and Recreation Department of the fictional city of Pawnee, Indiana. An overachiever, Knope believes the government should serve the people and is unceasingly optimistic about the potential of her role within it. For her performance as Knope, Poehler has been nominated for several awards and won a Golden Globe Award for Best Actress – Television Series Musical or Comedy.

== Background ==
Leslie Knope was born on January 18, 1975, in Eagleton, Indiana, due to a raccoon infestation in Pawnee, and has lived in Pawnee, Indiana, since infancy. According to the show's timeline, her father died in 1985. She was inspired to pursue a life of public service by the community programs she enjoyed as a child. While attending Pawnee North High School, Leslie served as Co-Vice President of the student body and participated in several student organizations including the Model United Nations, Debate Club, Mock Trial, Young Republicans, Young Democrats, and the Young Independents, which she founded. She graduated in the top 5% of her high-school class and summa cum laude from Indiana University's School of Public and Environmental Affairs.

In the first three seasons, Leslie is the deputy in Pawnee's Parks and Recreation Department, a midlevel bureaucratic position; in season four, she successfully campaigns to become a member of the city council. In her role as deputy director, she serves on several committees, including the Equal Opportunity Committee, the Fun in the Sun Committee, the Clean Restroom Task Force, the Handicapped Restroom Task Force, and the Task Force to Reduce the Number of Public Restrooms. She hopes to improve her town and to advance her career (possibly aiming to become the city manager). She has also stated her ultimate goal of becoming the first female President of the United States. Knope proudly displays in her office images of Hillary Clinton, Sandra Day O'Connor, Joe Biden, Madeleine Albright, Condoleezza Rice, Dianne Feinstein, Janet Reno, Nancy Pelosi, and Larry Bird. Leslie also has a love for sweets, especially waffles (which she frequently orders in large quantities at J.J.'s Diner) and whipped cream, which she puts in coffee, on waffles, etc.

On November 10, 2016, a member of the Parks and Recreation writing staff wrote an open letter for Vox from the fictional character Leslie Knope on the election results.

== Personality ==
Leslie Knope is extremely cheerful, ambitious, hard-working and optimistic. She is firmly committed to the belief that government should provide a service for its people, and regularly goes above and beyond for the benefits of Pawnee's residents — a belief that regularly clashes with her superior Ron Swanson (Nick Offerman), a staunch libertarian who feels all government should be dissolved and privatized.

Although somewhat naive, Leslie is intelligent, well-read, and has good intentions, but is not always successful in executing her goals. She repeatedly tries to put a positive spin on failure, even to the point where she will occasionally distort the truth in her own view. For example, she does not get discouraged by angry residents who complain or yell during her public forums, but instead prefers to think of them as "people caring loudly at me". Many of her co-workers do not share her enthusiasm, but Leslie commands their respect, nonetheless. Her ambition occasionally annoys her colleagues and leads to ribbing against her, especially from her subordinate Tom Haverford (Aziz Ansari). Her favorite food is waffles from a local diner, JJ's. She has a crush on then-vice president Joe Biden and harbors an irrational hatred of public libraries, salads, and the wealthy neighboring town of Eagleton, which Leslie found out, to her sheer horror, was actually her birthplace.

Leslie views herself as a budding political star in the style of Hillary Clinton, Nancy Pelosi, and Condoleezza Rice. She has been widely lauded as a positive figure for advancing gender equality and feminism because she represents a strong woman who encourages others to empower themselves and support the women around them. Although she is shown to be running for the city council as an independent, she joins the Democratic Party at some point, as she is approached by "Janet from the DNC" about a potential gubernatorial bid in the final season.

== Storyline ==
=== Season 1 ===
Leslie is initially shown to harbor romantic feelings for her co-worker Mark Brendanawicz (Paul Schneider), likely stemming from a romantic liaison with him several years before. She is also desperate to impress her mother, Marlene Griggs-Knope (Pamela Reed), a well-known politician in the Pawnee government. At a public forum, she meets Ann Perkins (Rashida Jones), who informs her about a gaping hole near her house that her boyfriend, Andy Dwyer (Chris Pratt), fell into. Leslie takes on the project and quickly becomes friends with Ann. She has a difficult relationship with her mother, a tough and tactless woman who has had a long and successful career in local government and who does not think much of her daughter's professional or personal choices.

=== Season 2 ===
Leslie seems to move on from her romantic interest in Mark and begins dating police officer Dave Sanderson (Louis C.K.). She also begins taking charge and gains a lot of confidence. Also, more of her relationships with her coworkers are shown. Towards the end of the season, Dave, who is enlisted in the U.S. Army Reserve, is called into active duty in San Diego, where he does custodial work. Dave asks Leslie to move with him to San Diego, and although she considers it, she ultimately declines because she loves her work and Pawnee too much to leave, and they part ways amicably. She then dates an old lawyer friend of Ann's named Justin (Justin Theroux). Although Justin seems to be a perfect boyfriend and has many interesting stories, Leslie soon realizes that stories are all Justin cares about. After he reunites Leslie's mother with an old flame over Leslie's constant protests, she breaks up with him, realizing that Justin cares more about the reunion story that he could potentially tell than he does about her. At the end of the season, Leslie and the rest of the department get a visit from two state auditors, Ben Wyatt (Adam Scott) and Chris Traeger (Rob Lowe), who shut down the government due to Pawnee's crippling financial problems. Leslie and Ben have an antagonistic relationship at first but soon develop a mutual respect for each other.

=== Season 3 ===
In this season, Leslie works on the Harvest Festival in hopes of bringing money to Pawnee. She and Ben are no longer at odds and develop a friendly working relationship, complicated by romantic feelings. However, their budding relationship is threatened by Chris' inter-office dating rules, and they attempt to keep their romance under wraps, despite telling Ann, Ron, Leslie's mother, and a maintenance worker at the memorial service for Lil' Sebastian, Pawnee's beloved, recently deceased miniature horse. In the season finale, Leslie is approached by a group of people who look for talent in government with the potential for political careers. They tell Leslie that they believe she has the potential to become a member of the city council or even the mayor.

=== Season 4 ===
Leslie comes to realize that while she is running for the city council, her relationship with Ben cannot continue, and they reluctantly break up. Leslie then announces her city council candidacy. Leslie writes a book called Pawnee: The Greatest Town in America. She also finds out that she was actually born in Eagleton because, according to her mother, "the Pawnee hospital had been overrun by raccoons." Leslie and Ben struggle with being broken up; Leslie wants to remain friends with Ben, but he tells her it's just too hard for him. Leslie finally decides she wants to be with Ben, no matter the consequences, and they get back together. Ben resigns from his position in order to save Leslie from getting fired. Her campaign managers inform her that they can no longer run her campaign because her approval ratings are dismally low after the news of her relationship with Ben was revealed. The rest of the Parks employees (and Ann), on a mission to return the love Leslie has shown them over the years, tell Leslie that they will run her campaign for her, allowing her to continue going after her dream. After several tumultuous months, it is announced that Bobby Newport (Paul Rudd), son of Sweetums founder Nick Newport (Christopher Murray), has won by 21 votes. Ben later approaches officials and notifies them that it is the law that they re-count since it was so close. Ann then reveals to Leslie that she in fact beat Bobby by 21 votes.

=== Season 5 ===
At the beginning of the season, she and Ben get engaged and move into a house together. She and Ben get married in the middle of the season, months earlier than the couple had originally planned. They initially arrange to marry at a black-tie event they planned and executed to raise money for the future park at Pawnee Commons. However, Leslie's City Council nemesis Jeremy Jamm (Jon Glaser) disrupts the ceremony by setting off stink bombs and booing Leslie, leading to Ron punching him in the face and getting them both arrested. However, the Parks and Recreation Department plans a secret wedding that same night in the office area, and Ron walks Leslie down the aisle. During her first year as a city councilor, she passes a city-wide soda tax, merges the animal control and parks department, and secures the money for the Pawnee Commons. At the end of the season, the Sweetums Corporation, a major manufacturer of sugary snacks and Pawnee's biggest employer, begins a campaign to recall her.

=== Season 6 ===
Leslie is a key member in the absorption of Eagleton into Pawnee because of a debt problem in Eagleton. After staging a filibuster which wins the citizens of former Eagleton voting rights, Leslie is recalled and replaced with her Eagletonian counterpart, Ingrid de Forest (Kristen Bell). Leslie gets the lot and parks for the Pawnee Commons after a heated debate between her and Jamm, in return for five worthless IOU's from Chris (who was soon leaving his post as City Manager). She dedicates the unofficial groundbreaking of Pawnee Commons to Ann before she and Chris leave for Michigan in "Ann and Chris". In "Flu Season 2", Leslie discovers that she is pregnant. In "One in 8,000", after a visit to a doctor, Ben and Leslie find out that they are going to have triplets. Soon after, Leslie is offered a position in the National Park Service, in Chicago. After stalling on her decision for most of the season, Leslie is eventually convinced by Ben to accept the job, but then after finding out that the Parks Department had her declared as one of the new founders of the new town of Pawnee, she convinces her new boss to relocate their office from Chicago to the Third Floor of Pawnee City Hall. Three years from the end of season six, Leslie and Ben have three children, and Leslie is the head of the Midwest Parks Service on the bustling third floor of Pawnee City Hall.

=== Season 7 ===
Leslie is head of the Midwest branch of the National Park Service, working to build a national park in Pawnee. Ron is her main opponent in this effort, as he wants to build a new Gryzzl campus. As the season progresses, however, Ron and Leslie eventually reconcile, and she successfully secures the national park for Pawnee. Soon afterward, she and Ben decide to move to Washington with Andy and his wife April Ludgate (Aubrey Plaza) after Leslie is offered a promotion to work at the U.S. Department of the Interior and Ben decides to run for Congress. In flash-forwards, it is shown that by the year 2025, Leslie will run a successful campaign for Governor of State of Indiana, and will serve two terms in that office. It is implied that either she or Ben (or both) has been elected President of the United States by 2048 when they are both flanked by the U.S. Secret Service at the funeral of Pawnee Mayor (and Leslie's former Parks employee) Garry Gergich (Jim O'Heir). In the present, the gang gets together for a picture, as they are unsure when the next time they see each other will be. Ben asks Leslie if she's ready, to which she responds, "Yes. I'm ready."

== Development ==
The concept for Parks and Recreation did not start to form until series creators Greg Daniels and Michael Schur learned Poehler would be available to play the lead character. Once that casting was determined, the general concept for both the series and the Leslie Knope character was established. After the first season, changes were made to Leslie's character to make her appear more intelligent. Schur said this was in response to critical feedback that Leslie came across as "ditzy" during the show's first run of episodes, which Schur said was never their intention. Schur said that the show considered a backstory element for Leslie where she had been elected mayor while a teenager; this story was later used for the Ben Wyatt character.

Amy Poehler said by the third season, after the Parks Department has been shut down for three months due to a budget crisis, Leslie has started to face reality more clearly and realize the department is a low priority.

== Critical reception ==
She was listed in AfterEllen.com's Top 50 Favorite Female TV Characters. In 2015, Entertainment Weekly named Knope as one of the 25 Best TV Characters of the Past 25 Years.

Poehler has garnered six Primetime Emmy Award nominations for Outstanding Lead Actress in a Comedy Series, three Golden Globe Award nominations and three Screen Actors Guild Award nominations for Outstanding Performance by a Female Actor in a Comedy Series for her role. In 2014, while hosting the ceremony, Poehler won the Golden Globe Award for Best Actress – Television Series Musical or Comedy for her portrayal of Leslie Knope.

=== Season one ===
Despite mixed reviews of the first season, one fairly consistent source of praise went to Amy Poehler for her performance as Leslie Knope. Tom Shales of The Washington Post writes that "Poehler's show unfortunately isn't worthy of her". Daniel Carlson of The Hollywood Reporter also had praise for Poehler claiming that she "has the comic intelligence to carry a series like this one" and delivers a performance that is "awkward but not alienating" and "eager without being repelling". However, several commentators said the naive and well-meaning Leslie Knope character too closely resembled The Office protagonist Michael Scott (Steve Carell), a well-intentioned but dimwitted manager of a paper company sales office.

=== Season two ===
James Poniewozik of Time magazine praised the development of the characters. He thought that the show "really has a handle now" on the main character Leslie Knope, and does an "excellent job of finding things for its supporting characters to do". He also opined that the series is "living up to its potential now". Commentators said the supporting cast was now working with better material and that Amy Poehler's character had improved and become less over-the-top and more human than in the first season.

=== Season three ===
By season three, Paste magazine writer Garrett Martin called Leslie "one of the most relatable and admirable women on television".

== 2023 Saturday Night Live appearance ==
Knope appeared on the January 21, 2023 episode of Saturday Night Live hosted by Aubrey Plaza. Plaza reprised the character of April Ludgate on Weekend Update, which was soon followed by Poehler reprising Knope. Poehler had appeared earlier in the episode, cameoing in Plaza's monologue.
