= Retta =

American comedian and actress (born 1970)

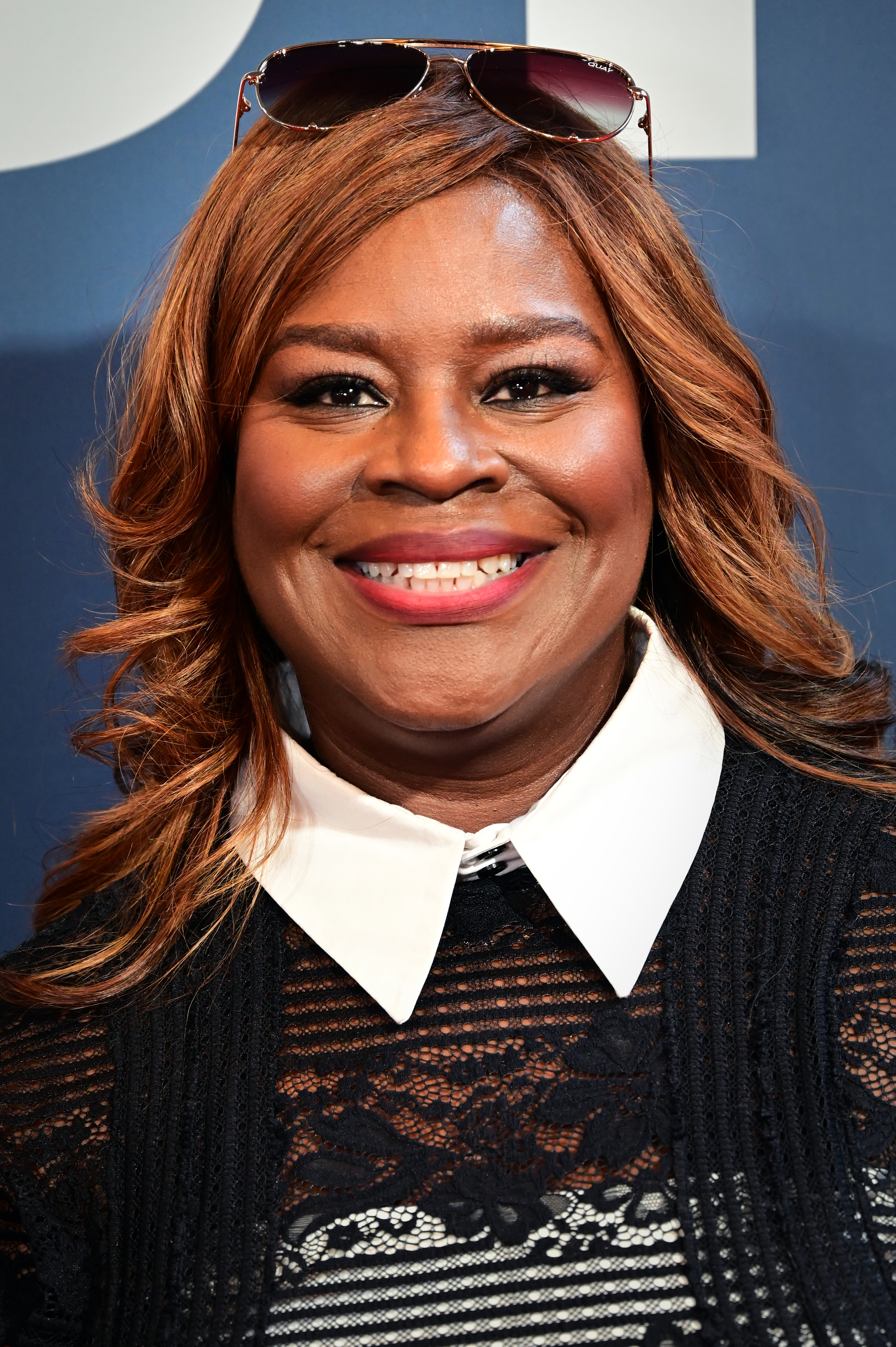
- Retta in 2026
- Born: Marietta Sangai Sirleaf; April 12, 1970 (age 56); Newark, New Jersey, U.S.
- Education: Duke University (BA)
- Occupations: Comedian; actress; television personality; singer
- Years active: 1997–present
- Relatives: Ellen Johnson Sirleaf (aunt)

Marietta Sangai Sirleaf (born April 12, 1970), known professionally as Big Retta or simply Retta, is an American stand-up comedian and actress. She is best known for her roles as Donna Meagle on NBC's Parks and Recreation and Ruby Hill on NBC's Good Girls. She has appeared in several films and television shows, and has performed stand-up on Comedy Central's Premium Blend.

== Early life and education ==
Retta was born in Newark, New Jersey. She is of Liberian descent. She grew up in Edison and in the Cliffwood Beach section of Aberdeen Township, New Jersey, where she attended Matawan Regional High School, graduating in 1988. In 1992, Retta graduated from Duke University in Durham, North Carolina, where she was pre-med and graduated with a degree in sociology.

Retta was raised as a member of the New Apostolic Church. In the youth group of her church, her ability to make others laugh was a major talent. When Retta competed in her first TV comedy contest, members from all over the world from the New Apostolic Church voted for her. This contributed to her winning the contest and helped to further her career. In that contest she mentioned her faith and spiritual upbringing.

== Career ==
After graduating from Duke, Retta worked as a chemist. In her spare time, she performed stand-up at Charlie Goodnights Comedy Club in Raleigh, North Carolina. Eventually, she moved to Los Angeles to pursue a career in comedy. Retta said on Wait Wait... Don't Tell Me! that when she started performing stand-up comedy, she decided to call herself Retta rather than explain her name. She started doing standup in 1996, although she said she did not start "earning money" until 1998, when she began touring on the college circuit. Retta said she used to get "really nauseated" before a performance, but that the feeling passed with experience. Retta has said her stand-up material tends to be slightly embellished stories from her regular everyday life, family, and friends.

Retta has served as the opening act for such comedians as Shirley Hemphill and Bobby Collins. She has made television appearances on Bravo's Welcome to the Parker, E! Entertainment Television's The Soup, Freddie, Moesha, It's Always Sunny in Philadelphia, and the "Comedy Divas Showcase" segment of The Jenny Jones Show. Retta has also performed on Premium Blend, a Comedy Central show featuring up-and-coming comedians.

In 2009, Retta started making regular guest appearances on the NBC comedy series Parks and Recreation as Donna Meagle, an employee in the Parks Department of the fictional town, Pawnee, Indiana. During a stand-up performance at the University of Illinois at Springfield, Retta said the acting job on the show was stressful because it was unclear how long the show would stay on the air, due to the poor reviews it received during the first season. Alan Sepinwall, a television columnist with The Star-Ledger, said season 2 episodes of Parks and Recreation afforded more personality and funnier jokes to Donna and other minor characters. She was upgraded to a full-time regular cast member in the third season.

In late 2011, she received a "Best Supporting Actress (Comedy)" nomination at the 3rd Indie Soap Awards for the indie web series Vampire Mob. Retta also hosted the 3rd Critics' Choice Television Awards in 2013. In 2014, she appeared on Hollywood Game Night as a contestant along with the other celebrities Paget Brewster, Michael Chiklis, Mario Lopez, Thomas Lennon, and Alyssa Milano. In 2015, Retta was one of the audiobook narrators for Welcome to Night Vale, a novel tie-in to the eponymous podcast series in which she is the voice of Old Woman Josie. The same year she appeared in season 2 of Bravo's Girlfriends' Guide to Divorce.

In 2018, Retta co-starred in the NBC series, Good Girls, opposite Christina Hendricks and Mae Whitman. In 2018, Retta published a series of essays in a book called So Close to Being the Sh*t, Y'all Don't Even Know where she talks about her journey with weight loss with "bestie" and the joys and adventures of being in the "Hollywood Scene!" In 2022, Retta signed a talent holding deal with NBCUniversal. Beginning in 2022, Retta hosted HGTV's Ugliest House in America. Beginning in 2024, Retta hosted HGTV's Scariest House in America.

== Personal life ==
On Wait Wait... Don't Tell Me!, she said she dated a man from Georgia who nicknamed her Retta because her name Marietta sounded like where he came from. She is a niece by marriage of the former Liberian president Ellen Johnson Sirleaf. Despite public confusion, Retta is not the cousin of Ginuwine. Retta is a fan of the Los Angeles Kings hockey team, and presented awards at the NHL award ceremonies in Las Vegas, in 2014 and 2015.

== Filmography ==
=== Film ===
Year	Title	Role	Notes	Ref.
1998	Ringmaster	Additional voices		
2002	Slackers	Bruna		
2003	Dickie Roberts: Former Child Star	Sad Eye Sadie		
2007	Fracture	Evidence Room Cop		
2007	Sex and Death 101	Ethel		
2007	Dragon Wars D-War	Receptionist Nurse		
2008	First Sunday	Roberta		
2014	Sex Ed	Sydney		
2015	Alvin and the Chipmunks: The Road Chip	Party Planner		
2016	Other People	Nina		
2016	Operator	Pauline "Roger" Rogers		
2016	Middle School: The Worst Years of My Life	Ida Stricker		
2017	To the Bone	Lobo		
2017	Band Aid	Carol		
2017	The Lego Ninjago Movie	Maggie the Cheerleader	Voice	
2017	Where's the Money	Roberta		
2017	Father Figures	Annie		
2019	Good Boys	Lucas' Mom		
2023	80 for Brady	Herself		
2023	Hit Man	Claudette		
2024	The Greatest Hits	Dr. Evelyn Bartlett		
2026	That Friend			
2026	Bad Day		Completed	

=== Television ===
Year	Title	Role	Notes	Ref.
1997	Moesha	Hostess	Episode: "Double Date" (Season 3, Episode 12)	
2004	$5.15/Hr	Joy		
2005	Freddie	Joan	Episode: "Rich Man, Poor Girl"	
2006	Rodney	Tanya Evans	Episode: "When Rodney Comes Marching Home"	
2008	It's Always Sunny in Philadelphia	Hardware Store Clerk	Episode: "The Gang Gets Extreme: Home Makeover Edition"	
2009–15, 2020	Parks and Recreation	Donna Meagle	Recurring (seasons 1–2); starring/main (seasons 3–7) (Note: For Parks and Recreation, Retta was credited after the opening title sequence with star billing for seasons 3-5, and was part of the opening title sequence as a main in seasons 6-7)	
2009	Jimmy Kimmel Live!	Heckler	Episode: "#7.46"	
2014, 2015	Kroll Show	TSA #1, Lara	Episodes: "Krolling Around with Nick Klown" and "Body Bouncers"	
2014	Drunk History	Sylvia Robinson	Episode: "American Music"	
2014	Key & Peele	The Woman	Episode: "Sex Addict Wendell"	
2015–18	Girlfriends' Guide to Divorce	Barbara	Recurring (season 2); main (season 3–5)	
2018–21	Good Girls	Ruby Hill	Main cast	
2019	Pinky Malinky	Mrs. Malinky (voice)		
2019	Big Mouth	Duke's Mother (voice)	Episode: "Duke"	
2019–20	Where's Waldo?	Wizard Nightingale (voice)	2 episodes	
2020–21	DuckTales	Mystical Harp (Voice)	2 episodes	
2020	Home Movie: The Princess Bride	The Mother	Episode: "Chapter One: As You Wish"	
2021	Duncanville	Makeover Station Employee (voice)	Episode: "Das Banana Boot"	
2022	Diabolical	Ghost's Mom (voice)	Episode: "An Animated Short Where Pissed-Off Supes Kill Their Parents"	
2022	Bubble Guppies	General Yuck (voice)	Episode: "Don’t Yuck My Yum!"	
2022	Tuca & Bertie	(voice)	2 episodes	
2022–present	Ugliest House in America	Host		
2023	The Morning Show	Herself	Episode: "The Green Light"	
2023	Bob's Burgers	Animal Control Officer (voice)	Episode: "The (Raccoon) King and I"	
2024–present	Scariest House in America	Host		
2024–25	Elsbeth	Margo Clarke	2 episodes	

== Bibliography ==
- Retta (2018). So Close to Being the Sh*t, Y'all Don't Even Know. New York: St. Martin's Press. ISBN 978-1-250-10934-7. OCLC 1001333805.
