= Andy and April's Fancy Party =

- Parks and Recreation episode
- Episode no.: Season 3 Episode 9
- Directed by: Michael Trim
- Written by: Katie Dippold
- Original air date: April 14, 2011

Guest appearances
- John Ellison Conlee as Larry Ludgate; Terri Hoyos as Rita Ludgate; Ben Schwartz as Jean-Ralphio Saperstein; Blake Lee as Derek; Josh Duvendeck as Ben; Eric Isenhower as Orin; Harris Wittels as Harris; Colton Dunn as Brett; Minni Jo Mazzola as Natalie Ludgate; Andrew Burlinson as "Burly" Burlinson; Mark Rivers as Drummer; Alan Yang as Bass Player; Pat Crawford Brown as Andy's grandma; Kathleen Coyne as Justice of the Peace; Tonya Cornelisse as Juliet; Shawn Parsons as Brian; Frederick Stoverink as Aaron

Episode chronology
← Previous "Camping"	Next → "Soulmates"
- Parks and Recreation season 3

"Andy and April's Fancy Party" (sometimes referred to as "Fancy Party") is the ninth episode of the third season of the American comedy television series Parks and Recreation, and the 39th overall episode of the series. It originally aired on NBC in the United States on April 14, 2011. In the episode, Andy and April hold a dinner party, which turns out to be a surprise wedding, much to Leslie's concern. Meanwhile, Ben mulls whether to remain in Pawnee or return to his old job in Indianapolis, and Ann feels extremely uncomfortable while attending a singles mixer.

The episode was written by Katie Dippold and directed by Michael Trim. The wedding between Andy and April was a culmination of a romantic subplot between the two characters that began in the second season episode "Hunting Trip". The Parks and Recreation staff tried to keep the wedding secret to surprise viewers, but NBC accidentally ran a commercial advertising the wedding two months earlier, after the episode "Ron & Tammy: Part Two." Series co-creator Michael Schur initially said the promo was meant to refer to Ron and his ex-wife Tammy, but later admitted it was an error.

"April and Andy's Fancy Party" featured several guest performances by actors who appeared in previous episodes, including Ben Schwartz as Jean-Ralphio Saperstein, Josh Duvendeck and Blake Lee as Derek and Ben, Minni Jo Mazzola as Natalie Ludgate, and Mark Rivers, Andrew Burlinson and Alan Yang as Andy's bandmates. According to Nielsen Media Research, the episode was seen by 5.16 million household viewers, a slight increase over the previous original episode, "Camping". It received generally positive reviews.

== Plot ==
During a cold open scene, Ron horrifies the entire parks department by apparently pulling an aching tooth out of his own mouth with a pair of pliers. He later admits it was a prank, as a dentist had removed the tooth the previous day. Later, Andy and April invite everyone to a dinner party at the home of Andy's bandmate Burly, where Andy is living. Ben tells Leslie that his boss in Indianapolis wants him back on the road, but he has also been offered a job to work under Chris in Pawnee. Although Leslie wants Ben to stay, she is hesitant to say so outright, disappointing him and leaving him conflicted over which job to take.

At the party, Leslie discovers Andy and April plan to surprise everyone by getting married that night. Leslie spends most of the party trying to dissuade them, since they have been dating less than a month and have no place to live. However, Ron believes it is not Leslie's place to interfere with their decision. Tom is thrilled when Andy makes him his best man, but his excitement lessens when Andy also asks Ron, Chris, and several others to be his "best men". Tom tries to throw an impromptu bachelor party and give a speech to make himself the "best" best man, but fails each time.

Although Leslie plans to object during the ceremony, she cannot bring herself to do it and comes to accept the marriage. Andy and April officially become husband and wife. Afterward, Ron explains to Leslie that she did not object because deep down she knew that Andy and April would get married no matter what, and that there is no correct way to do things when it comes to matters of the heart, using his own two former marriages as an example. During the reception, April privately tells Leslie how much she appreciates her, flattering Leslie. Andy makes a speech to the guests, where he calls Tom his "best" best man, much to Tom's delight. He tells the crowd that life is short and he and April simply did what made them happy. Taking Andy's advice, Leslie asks Ben to stay in Pawnee, and he surprises her by revealing that he has already accepted Chris' job offer.

In a subplot, Ann goes to a singles mixer where she is extremely uncomfortable. She runs into Donna, who at first views Ann as competition, but then offers her advice after witnessing Ann's awkward flirting. When Ann hears about Andy getting married from Leslie, she considers going home, as she and Andy dated for several years. Donna tells Ann to forget her past and enjoy herself in the present. Ann ends up having a good time at the mixer and gets several phone numbers.

== Production ==
"Andy and April's Fancy Party" was written by Katie Dippold and directed by Michael Trim. It is referred to simply as "Fancy Party" in some publications. During a break between the development of the first six episodes of the season and the remaining episodes, the writing staff was contemplating what direction they should take with the romantic relationship between Andy and April. Parks co-creator Michael Schur said they wanted to avoid the "standard-issue TV romance plots: fights, other men/women driving them apart, and so on". They decided the two should get married after dating for only a short time because it was funny, it made sense with the characters' personalities, and it raised the stakes for future stories involving the two. Schur said: "We just thought about who they were – two impulsive goofballs who don't approach their lives in a responsible, adult manner – and decided, what the hell? What if they just make a rash decision and get hitched?"

The cast and crew of Parks and Recreation made a conscious effort not to discuss the Andy and April wedding during media interviews with the hopes of keeping it a surprise. However, after the original broadcast of the third season episode "Ron & Tammy: Part Two", NBC ran a commercial advertising "April and Andy's wedding registry" on the official Parks and Recreation website. At this point in the series, April and Andy were separated and had not yet reconciled. Shortly after the episode aired, HitFix television reviewer Alan Sepinwall wrote that the commercial mistakenly used the wrong names and was actually referring to Ron and Tammy's wedding registry. However, after "Andy and April's Fancy Party" aired, Schur admitted the commercial was intended to run with that episode, but ran with "Ron & Tammy: Part Two" due to an error by NBC employees:

"In an effort to undo the spoiler, we publicly stated, in a number of interviews, that NBC had just accidentally gotten the character names wrong, and that there was no upcoming Andy-April wedding. We sincerely hope that fans of the show are cool with us gently lying to them, in an effort to maintain the surprise nuptials as much as we could. Now if you'll excuse us, we have to go shoot the season finale surprise Jerry-Donna wedding scene."

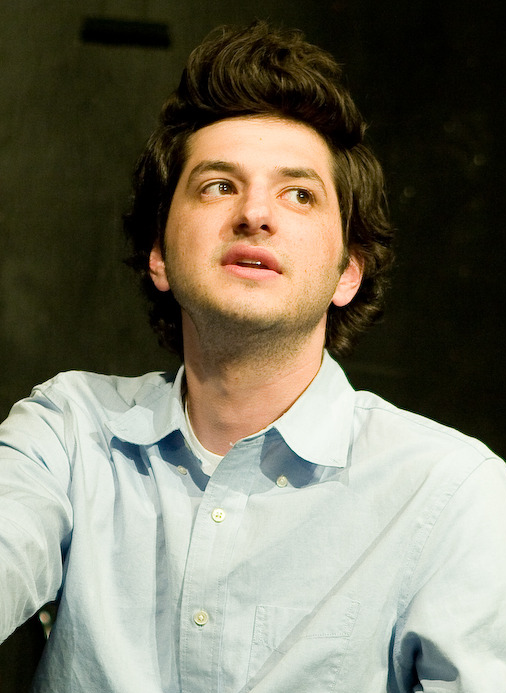
Several actors who appeared in previous Parks and Recreation episodes reprised their roles in "Andy and April's Fancy Party", including Ben Schwartz (pictured) as Tom Haverford's playboy-like friend Jean-Ralphio Saperstein.

"Andy and April's Fancy Party" featured several guest performances by actors who had appeared in previous Parks and Recreation episodes. Ben Schwartz reprised his role as Tom's playboy-like friend Jean-Ralphio Saperstein. April's flower men were Ben and Derek, played by Josh Duvendeck and Blake Lee. Derek is April's bisexual ex-boyfriend and Ben was the boy he dated while simultaneously dating April; the two had appeared in several second season episodes. Minni Jo Mazzola reprised her recurring role as April's sister Natalie Ludgate. Andy's band Mouse Rat, which has appeared in previous episodes starting with the first season finale "Rock Show", also appeared in "Andy and April's Fancy Party". Mark Rivers played the drums, Andrew Burlinson played guitar and Parks and Recreation screenwriter Alan Yang played bass guitar. Eric Isenhower made his first appearance on the show as Orin, a creepy Goth friend of April. The character was mentioned offhandedly in the episode "Time Capsule" and Dippold loved the idea of him, so she worked Orin into the script.

The day the episode first aired, the term "Ron Swanson", and the misspelled "Rob Swanson", were so commonly discussed on the social-networking website Twitter that they were listed among the site's trending topics, which are indicative of being the most popular topics being discussed on Twitter at a given moment. Shortly after the episode's original broadcast, NBC started a fake wedding website about the wedding called "Andy and April's Awesome Sauce Wedding", which included photos and a guestbook website visitors can sign.

== Cultural references ==
Andy gets married wearing the jersey of Reggie Wayne, wide receiver for the Indianapolis Colts. April had previously given him the jersey as a gift in the second-season episode "Christmas Scandal". The Simon and Garfunkel song "April Come She Will" plays while April walks down the aisle. Chris performs a break dance to the House of Pain hip hop song "Jump Around". While trying to understand why the wedding is happening so quickly, Leslie asks whether April is dying, like the lead character from the 2002 romance film A Walk to Remember. While trying to decide on a joke for his best man speech, Tom asks Jean-Ralphio which Vince Vaughn movie he should choose; Jean-Ralphio confidently answers Fred Claus, a 2007 Christmas comedy film.

Ben was asked to bring the 2009 science fiction film Avatar to the wedding, along with 50 pairs of 3-D glasses and a 3-D-capable television. At one point, Tom makes fun of Ben's nerdiness by making a reference to The Lord of the Rings film trilogy, but Ben explains he did not enjoy the film adaptation by director Peter Jackson. When someone refers to actress Julia Roberts, Ron only recognizes her as "that toothy girl from Mystic Pizza". After seeing Ann flirt awkwardly, Donna asks her "Did you grow up in the woods? Are you Nell?", referring to Jodie Foster's character from the film Nell. In one scene, Andy used the phrase "Xbox pancake", a reference to a video game console, while describing the idea of combining two great things.

== Reception ==
=== Ratings ===
In its original American broadcast, "Andy and April's Fancy Party" was seen by an estimated 5.16 million household viewers, according to Nielsen Media Research, with a 3.1 rating/5 share among all viewers and a 2.5 rating/7 share among viewers between ages 18 and 49. It constituted a slight ratings increase over the previous original episode "Camping". Parks and Recreation was defeated in its 9:30 p.m. timeslot by the Fox crime drama Bones, which was seen by an average of 11.1 million households. However, Parks defeated repeats of the ABC medical drama Grey's Anatomy, which drew 4.18 million household viewers, and the CBS crime drama CSI: Crime Scene Investigation which, although it had more viewers at 8.23 million households, had a lower rating than Parks, drawing 1.5 rating/4 share among viewers between ages 18 and 49. "Andy and April's Fancy Party" also outperformed an original episode of the CW Network drama Nikita, which drew 2.14 million households.

=== Reviews ===
By now, the romance between April and Andy is so central to Parks and Recreation that it's easy to forget how unexpected it was when it first began. ... There were no plans whatsoever to develop a romance between April and Andy—until writers noticed, and decided to pursue, the surprising, untapped chemistry between Pratt and Aubrey Plaza in season two's "Hunting Trip". "Fancy Party" does a terrific job of showing how far both characters have come since those early, awkward encounters.

— Scott Meslow, The Atlantic

"Andy and April's Fancy Party" received generally positive reviews. Alan Sepinwall of HitFix called it "one of the funniest, sweetest, just plain best episodes of this season of this great comedy", and that it embodied "intoxicating mix of laughs and sweetness that "Parks and Rec" consistently nails". Sepinwall particularly praised the scene when April declared her love for Leslie, and enjoyed the comedic pairing of Ann and Donna. Time magazine writer James Poniewozik said the episode showed Parks and Recreation in "top form", and he praised the episode for avoiding television cliches about weddings. In most shows, he wrote, April and Andy would have been persuaded to stop the wedding at the last moment, or Andy would have panicked after realizing the enormity of what he had done. Matt Fowler of IGN called the episode "charming, effortless, and hilarious" and wrote "the strength of this episode was that it actually convinced us all that April and Andy getting married, after just a month of dating, was a great idea". TV Guide writer Matt Roush called "Andy and April's Fancy Wedding" the highlight of the night among NBC's Thursday comedy shows, and said he particularly loved the scene with Ron Swanson pulling out his tooth, and another later scene where Ron criticized Chris for bringing a vegetarian loaf to the party instead of cake.

ChicagoNow writer Andy Daglas said the fact that Andy and April's wedding was subdued, not overhyped in commercials to attract ratings, shows how much the writers understand and respect their characters. He also praised the episode's blend of "humor and heart", of which he said: "No show on the air, and few shows I can think of ever, does it better." Zap2it writer Rick Porter said he was surprised by the wedding twist, particularly by the fact that the wedding was not stopped at the last moment by a "TV-style complication". He also praised the subplot with Ann and Donna, and said he hoped the two characters would continue to interact with each other throughout the season. The Atlantic writer Scott Meslow said "Andy and April's Fancy Party" showed how well the April and Andy characters have developed since their romantic story arc began in the second-season episode "Hunting Trip". Meslow said the episode "couldn't have been better" and was even effective during unabashed sentimental scenes, like the wedding itself and April voicing her appreciation for Leslie. Steve Heisler of The A.V. Club said the wedding felt appropriate for the two characters, and he enjoyed the progression of Leslie going from dreading the wedding to accepting it. Heisler wrote, "Truly, I don't think I've ever watched an episode of Parks & Rec without feeling great at the end."

Eric Sundermann of Hollywood.com said the fact that the wedding scene works shows how genuine the characters are and how well they are presented by the writers. Sundermann also praised the cold open with Ron ripping his tooth out, and said he enjoyed the way Ann Perkins' character has continued to develop through the season. Steve Kandell of New York magazine called April and Andy perhaps the "most convincingly matched and resoundingly sympathetic couple in sitcom history", and said their storylines have been handled much more effectively than those of Jim Halpert and Pam Beesly in the NBC comedy The Office. Kandell was more critical of the Ann character, and said she did not seem to fit as a part of the show anymore. Some reviews were less positive. Entertainment Weekly writer Hillary Busis said there were individual elements of the episode she enjoyed, but felt the wedding happened too quickly and the lack of buildup reduced the tension leading up to the event. Joel Keller of TV Squad said, "In a mostly stellar season, this one sits near the bottom of the list." Keller said the wedding ruined an otherwise funny episode, and that it felt ineffective and rushed because April and Andy were fighting with each other only four episodes earlier. He also criticized the Ann Perkins character: "I've never seen Rashida Jones play a character this wishy-washy before, and it's not pleasant to watch."
