= Camping (Parks and Recreation) =

- Parks and Recreation episode
- Episode no.: Season 3 Episode 8
- Directed by: Rob Schrab
- Written by: Aisha Muharrar
- Original air date: March 24, 2011

Guest appearances
- Andy Forrest as Kyle; Annie O'Donnell as Elsa Clack; Phil Reeves as Paul Iaresco

Episode chronology
← Previous "Harvest Festival"	Next → "Andy and April's Fancy Party"
- Parks and Recreation season 3

"Camping" is the eighth episode of the third season of the American comedy television series Parks and Recreation, and the 38th overall episode of the series. It originally aired on NBC in the United States on March 24, 2011. In the episode, the parks department goes on a camping trip to think of a way to follow up on the harvest festival, but Leslie struggles to come up with an idea. Meanwhile, Chris returns to Pawnee as the new city manager, as Ann continues trying to cope with their recent break-up.

The episode was written by Aisha Muharrar and directed by Rob Schrab. It marked the reappearance of Rob Lowe, who was originally expected to depart the show after the episode "Indianapolis" after a recurring guest role, but instead joined the regular cast. "Camping" featured guest appearances by Phil Reeves as outgoing city manager Paul and Annie O'Donnell as the owner of a bed and breakfast.

Prior to the episode's broadcast, Rashida Jones said she liked the new storylines that had developed for Ann Perkins' character, preferring that she remain single than simply get back together with Chris. According to Nielsen Media Research, "Camping" was seen by 5.15 million household viewers, a 39 percent increase from the previous episode, "Harvest Festival". The episode received generally positive reviews, with several commentators praising Jones' performance and the new direction her character was taking.

== Plot ==
During a press conference about the success of the recent Pawnee harvest festival, city manager Paul suffers a massive heart attack. Chris accepts an offer to work as acting city manager while Paul recovers from bypass surgery. Chris requests of Leslie more large-scale ideas to generate revenue, placing pressure on her to follow up the harvest festival, so she organizes a camping trip for the parks department to discuss ideas. Ann feels awkward now that Chris is back; the two previously dated, but Chris broke up with Ann in such a friendly manner that she did not initially realize it was a break-up. Leslie invites Ann to the camping trip to help her feel better.

Nobody except Leslie really cares about the trip: Ron just wants to fish, Ben failed to bring a tent, and Tom just wants to relax in his huge tent filled with luxury electronic items. Tom expresses confusion as to why Ben, a state auditor who had been helping with Pawnee's financial problems, has not returned to his old job at Indianapolis; Ben does not explain his reasons, but it is hinted he harbors romantic feelings for Leslie. Meanwhile, Andy sets up a romantic tent for April at the wrong campsite miles away, forcing him to trek through the wilderness to find everyone. This leads to April feeling miserable at the campsite without Andy around. During brainstorming sessions, nobody produces any good ideas because they assume Leslie will think of one. However, she worriedly confides to Ann and Ben that she cannot think of anything on the same level as the harvest festival.

Chris pays a visit during his nightly jog, and Ann leaves with him so they can clear the air. Over dinner, Chris once again acts so optimistic while discussing the break-up that Ann thinks their relationship is back on and tries to kiss him, severely embarrassing herself. Meanwhile, the camping trip proves unsuccessful and everybody decides to go home that night, but they are left without transportation because Tom and Ben have hooked all of their electronics to the van's battery, draining it. Everybody hikes to a strange bed and breakfast filled with cats and dolls called The Quiet Corn, run by a strict old lady named Elsa Clack. Andy arrives and rebuilds the romantic tent in the yard for a flattered April. Leslie tells Ron about her mental block, worrying she will never again produce an idea better than the harvest festival. Ron, recognizing how burnt out she is, solves Leslie's problem by locking her in a bedroom and ordering her to get some sleep. With a rare full night's sleep energizing her, Leslie wakes up with numerous big ideas that are well received by Chris.

== Production ==
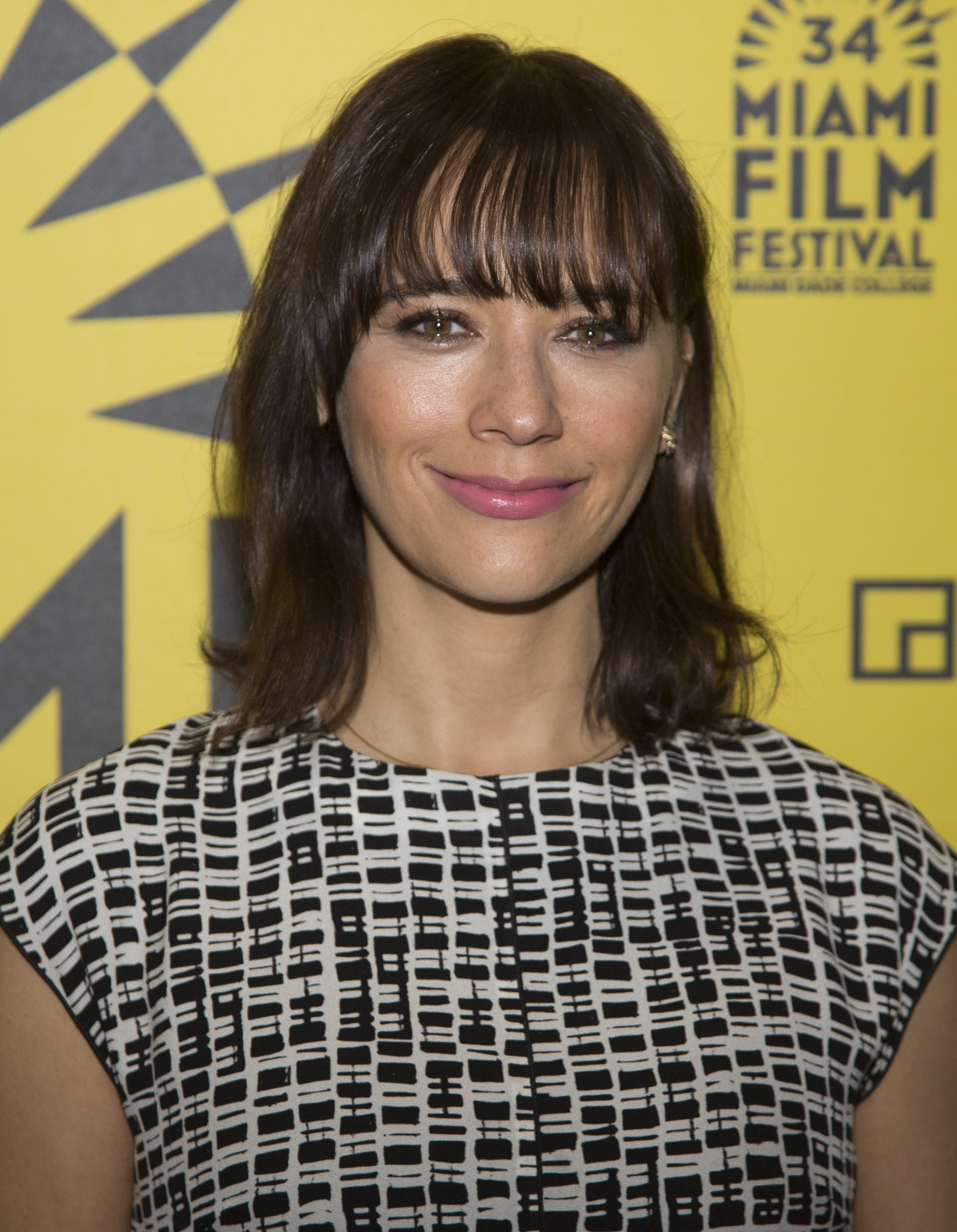
Prior to the broadcast of "Camping", Rashida Jones (pictured) said she liked the new storylines that had developed for her character, Ann Perkins.

"Camping" was written by Aisha Muharrar and directed by Rob Schrab. It featured a guest appearance by Phil Reeves, who has played Pawnee township manager Paul Iaresco in several episodes dating back to the first season episode "Canvassing". Paul's departure from that position is used as a means to reintroduce Rob Lowe's character, Chris Traeger. Lowe was originally expected to be a guest star departing from the show after the episode "Indianapolis". However, after his original string of episodes were filmed, Lowe was signed as a permanent Parks and Recreation cast member, prompting the writers to find a way to reintroduce the character to the series. "Camping" also featured a guest appearance by New York-based actress Annie O'Donnell as Elsa Clack, owner of The Quiet Corn.

Prior to the episode's broadcast, Rashida Jones said she liked the new storylines that had developed for Ann Perkins' character, preferring that she remain single than simply get back together with Chris: "It was pretty embarrassing what Ann went through, so I think she kind of has to recover from that before anything else. And this is a good time for Ann to be single too, because she hasn't been single ever on the show. I think she needs to do that a little bit." Shortly after "Camping" first aired, a fake website for the bed and breakfast business The Quiet Corn was put up on the official NBC website, advertising the fictional establishment's features, room amenities and meal services. During one scene in "Camping", Tom refers to one of the gadgets in his tent as DJ Roomba, an iPod music player attached to an autonomous robotic vacuum cleaner. The gadget, built by Tom, was previously featured in the second-season episode "Sweetums".

== Cultural references ==
Tom fills his tent with electronics and other extravagant items from Sky Mall, a chain of luxury item retail stores. He nicknames the tent "The Thunderdome", named after the gladiator arena in the action film Mad Max Beyond Thunderdome (1985). While watching TV inside his tent, Tom claims to be recording the Food Network show Cupcake Wars, the CBS police procedural drama NCIS: Los Angeles and the sixth season of the Bravo reality series Top Chef. Later, while pitching his idea for a Pawnee amphitheatre, Tom expresses hope it would entice performances from such rappers as Lil Wayne, Drake and Jay-Z.

While searching for inspiration for an idea, Leslie reads from her dream journal and recalls a dream where she happily married ALF, the alien protagonist of a science fiction sitcom of the same name. Later, Leslie listens to the Len song "Steal My Sunshine", which she calls a one-hit wonder and compares to her own lack of ability to come up with a second idea. Ben cheers Leslie up and compliments her work ethic by calling her the "Energizer Bunny of city government." During a later scene, Tom mockingly calls Ben the "white Urkel", a reference to the archetype nerd character Steve Urkel from the comedy series Family Matters. Donna can be seen reading a book called Your Erogenous Zones. The bed and breakfast owner plays Beethoven's "Ode to Joy" on a harpsichord.

== Reception ==
=== Ratings ===
In its original American broadcast, "Camping" was seen by an estimated 5.15 million household viewers, according to Nielsen Media Research, with a 3.0 rating/5 share among all viewers and a 2.4 rating/7 share among viewers between ages 18 and 49. It constituted a 39 percent increase from the previous episode, "Harvest Festival", which was seen by 4.08 million household viewers, a low for the season. Parks and Recreation was defeated in its 9:30 p.m. timeslot by the ABC medical drama Grey's Anatomy, which was seen by an average 10.1 million households; the Fox crime drama Bones, which was seen by 8.78 million households; and CBS coverage of NCAA basketball, which was seen by 6.82 million household. In network television, it beat only a repeat of the CW Network drama Nikita, which drew 1.397 million households.

=== Reviews ===
Leslie may be worried about having to live up to the legend of the Harvest Festival, but "Camping" was a sign of the strong shape "Parks and Recreation" is in as it heads into whatever stories we have for the rest of this season. And then, thankfully, for the season after that.

— Alan Sepinwall, HitFix

"Camping" received generally positive reviews, with several commentators praising the performance of Rashida Jones and the new comedic direction her character was taking. Eric Sundermann of Hollywood.com praised how the script featured the entire ensemble cast together, rather than in separate subplots like recent episodes. He also enjoyed the developments with Ann's character, claiming it gave Jones more opportunities to shine than past episodes. Entertainment Weekly writer Hillary Busis said she particularly enjoyed the jokes involving Jerry's character, and said she enjoyed that Ann once again misinterpreted Chris, although she said the joke was predictable. Zap2it writer Rick Porter said the episode was not as funny as the previous episode, "Harvest Festival", but said "if this is what qualifies as a (slightly) down episode for the show, then that's the sign of a comedy that's hitting for a very high average". He particularly praised the "fantastic dynamic" that has developed between Rashida Jones and Rob Lowe. TV Squad writer Joel Keller said the camping trip was a good way to avoid making the show feel stale following "Harvest Festival", and that the outdoors setting created strong potential for character-driven jokes by putting them out of their elements.

Steve Heisler of The A.V. Club praised the episode for highlighting each of its characters, all of whom he said were at their best except for April, who he said seemed out of place in the camping storyline. He also said he was glad Ann's recent breakup with Chris "has allowed her true colors to shine through". Matt Richenthal of TV Fanatic called it a "tremendously enjoyable episode" and "mostly just a chance to sit back and spend time with these goofy, lovable individuals". He praised the new storyline for Ann Perkins, claiming it created more comedic potential for Jones. Matt Fowler of IGN praised the performance of Rashida Jones and Chris Pratt, and called Leslie's stress over failing to come up with a new idea a "great little story". Alan Sepinwall of HitFix said "Camping" was not as funny as previous third-season episodes but was still an enjoyable episode that he found more "slow and contemplative", which he found indicative of the fact that the series was still on a strong track.

Steve Kandell of New York magazine compared it to the second-season episode "Hunting Trip", but said "Camping" was "somewhat more of a placeholder". Kandell compared the characters' pressure to meet the city's expectations to those the show faces now that they have been renewed for a fourth season. ChicagoNow writer Andy Daglas called it "a fun episode, but also one that felt like sort of a pause, a chance to reset the pins". He compared the pressure on Leslie to come up with an idea on the harvest festival to pressure on the show's writing staff to follow up on the harvest festival story arc. The Atlantic writer Scott Meslow called it funny and charming, but also a low point in the season following seven excellent episodes. He said it depended too much on the show's romantic relationships, which he feels are growing stale, although he praised Rashida Jones's performance and the focus on the strong platonic relationship between Leslie and Ron.
