= Harvest Festival (Parks and Recreation) =

- Parks and Recreation episode
- Episode no.: Season 3 Episode 7
- Directed by: Dean Holland
- Written by: Daniel J. Goor
- Original air date: March 17, 2011

Guest appearances
- Vincent Angelo as Ed; Mo Collins as Joan Callamezzo; Jay Jackson as Perd Hapley; Jonathan Joss as Ken Hotate; Chris Lusti as Reporter; Joey Russo as Kiley; Becky Thyre as Tania

Episode chronology
← Previous "Indianapolis"	Next → "Camping"
- Parks and Recreation season 3

"Harvest Festival" is the seventh episode of the third season of the American comedy television series Parks and Recreation, and the 37th overall episode of the series. It originally aired on NBC in the United States on March 17, 2011. In the episode, Leslie and her co-workers hold Pawnee's harvest festival, the success of which will determine the future of the parks department. The festival faces several obstacles, including a supposed Native American curse, a missing miniature horse and a scandal-hungry media. Meanwhile, Ann tries to cope with her recent break-up, and April confesses her love to Andy, then becomes angry with his response.

Written by Daniel J. Goor and directed by Dean Holland, the episode marked the culmination of a seven-episode story arc about the harvest festival that began with the third-season premiere, "Go Big or Go Home". Unlike the first six episodes of the season, it was not written and produced immediately following the second season, which had been done to accommodate actress Amy Poehler's pregnancy. The episode also does not feature Rob Lowe as he was originally only expected to be a guest star when the episode was conceived; however, he does return for subsequent episodes as a regular cast member.

The episode featured appearances by regular guest stars Mo Collins and Jay Jackson, as well as the first appearance by Jonathan Joss as the leader of a local Native American tribe. The harvest festival scenes were shot at Los Angeles Pierce College, and an aerial shot of the festival itself was the most expensive shot in the series. According to Nielsen Media Research, "Harvest Festival" was seen by 4.08 million household viewers, one of the lowest ratings of the series. The episode received critical acclaim, with many reviewers calling it one of the show's best episodes as well as a major turning point in the series.

== Plot ==
With the Harvest Festival days away, Leslie surprises everyone by booking Li'l Sebastian, a miniature horse and legendary Pawnee celebrity. Everyone is thrilled except Ben, who doesn't understand Li'l Sebastian's appeal. The chief of the local Wamapoke tribe, Ken Hotate, visits the parks department and requests the harvest festival be moved, as it is built upon the site of a Wamapoke massacre. When Leslie explains it is too late to move the festival anywhere else, Ken warns them the festival may become cursed. Ann works the harvest festival first aid tent, where she confides in Donna that she has become depressed after Chris broke up with her. April tells Andy that she loves him, but grows angry when he replies, "Dude, shut up! That is awesomesauce!"

Joan Callamezzo arrives to report on the festival and is determined to find a negative story, although she does show excitement over Li'l Sebastian. She initially fails to find a scandal, but then overhears Leslie and Ben discussing the curse. It becomes the focus of her story, especially after Tom tells Leslie that Li'l Sebastian escaped his pen. Tom blames Jerry, although it was entirely Tom's fault. The Pawnee media swarms the festival to cover the curse, endangering its opening the next day with the bad press, with one reporter likening Ben's past as a failed teen mayor with the curse. Now believing himself to be the curse, Ben leaves the festival. As Leslie reassures the reporters there is no curse, the power generator blows out, leaving the festival dark and stranding most of the parks department on a Ferris wheel. Using the blackout as an excuse, Ann takes Donna's advice to make out with Kiley (Joey Russo), her dumb but attractive patient.

On the Ferris wheel, with April and Andy arguing below him and Tom and Jerry arguing above him, an annoyed Ron clears the air by announcing the obvious: April is mad at Andy for not telling her that he loves her back, and the missing Li'l Sebastian is Tom's fault, not Jerry’s. Andy tells April that he clearly loves her and they hug, and Tom apologizes to Jerry. Later, everyone spots Li'l Sebastian in the corn maze and they retrieve him. Leslie learns the power outage was due to television crews plugging into the grid and overloading it. The only replacement generator in Pawnee is at the Wamapoke casino, and Leslie humbly asks Ken to loan it to her in exchange for placing a Wamapoke cultural exhibit near the Harvest Festival entrance. Ken agrees, and during the festival opening the next morning, he performs a meaningless ceremony to remove the fake curse. People begin to swarm into the festival, and Leslie cheerfully greets them. Ben returns to apologize to Leslie for leaving, admitting that he is not over his past. She reassures him the festival is as much his accomplishment as hers, and even has Ken break Ben's "curse", although Ken's gesture is also completely meaningless. At the end, Ben appears to have been won over by Li'l Sebastian, but admits to the camera crew that he still fails to see the appeal and remains as baffled as ever.

== Production ==
"Harvest Festival" was written by Daniel J. Goor and directed by Dean Holland. The episode marked the culmination of a seven-episode story arc that began with the third season premiere, "Go Big or Go Home", in which Leslie and the parks department prepare to relaunch the harvest festival, which had previously been a Pawnee tradition before it ended. The storyline stemmed from serious budget problems facing Pawnee which forced a government shutdown and threatened major cuts to the parks department, prompting Leslie to bring the harvest festival back and stake the future of the entire department on its success or failure. Amy Poehler said she believed the storyline was appropriate for a series about small government and was well handled by the writers: "What I like about the show is it doesn't spend 25 episodes talking about this thing, it talks about it in the right amount of time. It happens and then there's consequences of it. The show keeps moving forward, which is always really fun."

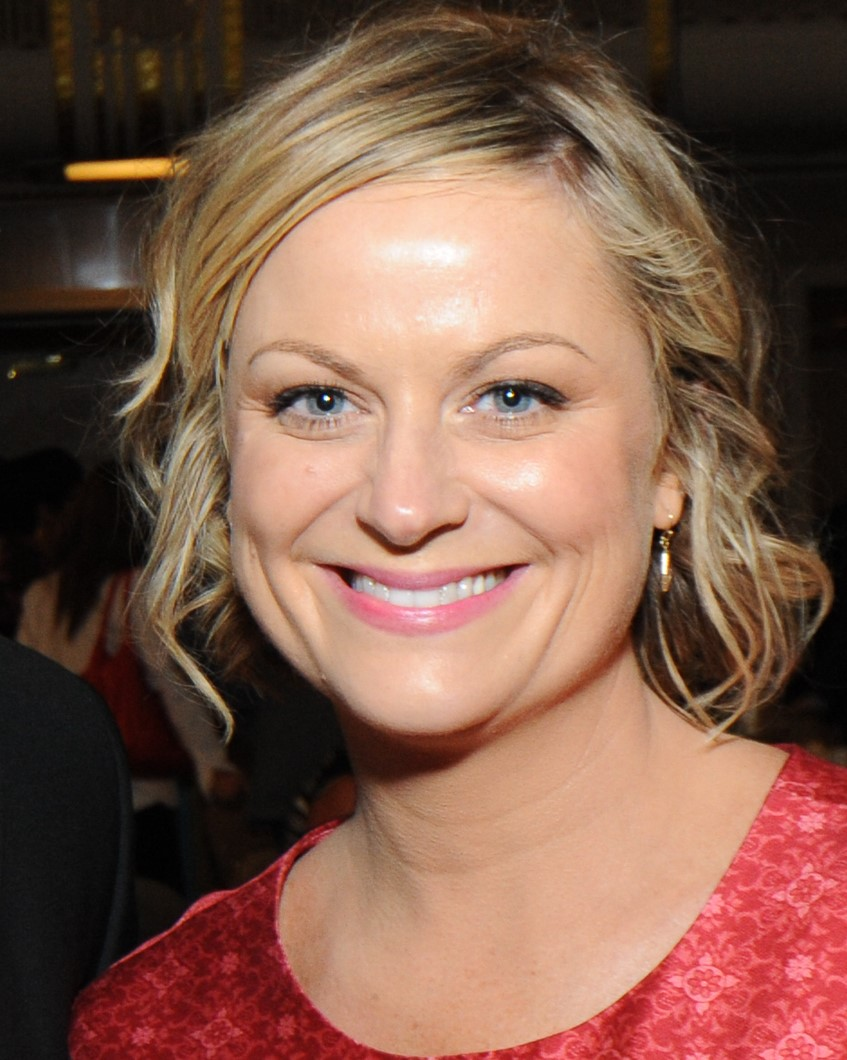
Parks and Recreation co-creator Michael Schur described "Harvest Festival" as a particularly empowering episode for Leslie Knope, played by Amy Poehler (pictured).

"Harvest Festival" was the first episode of the season written and produced separately from the second season. The previous six episodes from the third season were filmed almost immediately after the second season ended as part of an early shooting schedule to accommodate Poehler's pregnancy. Series co-creator Michael Schur described it as a particularly empowering episode for the Leslie Knope character: "When you see this episode [...] it makes you love her even more. This episode is about Leslie being noticed for the incredible hard work she does." Schur also said he believed the subplot with April and Andy was one that several young people in their situation have faced in real life: "Andy is put into a situation that a lot of people have been put into in our lives and he does the exact wrong thing you can do. And that's sort of the template for them going forward is what's the wrongest thing you can do? That's sort of how we follow them." Chris Pratt said he believed the conflict provided strong romantic and comedic potential for the characters: "There definitely will be conflict in their relationship [and] there's still a lot of room for comedy in there, because we have good writers."

Rob Lowe, a regular cast member with Parks and Recreation, did not appear in "Harvest Festival" because the actor was originally slated to only appear in the first six episodes of the season as a guest star. However, after those episodes were filmed, Lowe joined the cast as a permanent cast member, and his character Chris Traeger would return in the next episode, "Camping", as well as all subsequent episodes. "Harvest Festival" included guest appearances by Mo Collins and Jay Jackson as, respectively, Joan Callamezzo and Perd Hapley, two Pawnee television journalists who appeared in multiple Parks and Recreation episodes. It also featured the first guest appearance of Jonathan Joss as Wamapoke tribe leader Ken Hotate. Joss previously voiced John Redcorn in the animated television series King of the Hill, which was co-created by Parks and Recreation co-creator Greg Daniels. Schur said while writing about the Native American curse, the writing staff wanted it to be the local media that turned it into an issue rather than the citizens of Pawnee, because they felt it would be too cartoonish and unbelievable for the residents to take it so seriously.

Due to budget constraints, the Parks and Recreation set department did not build the harvest festival and corn maze sets, but instead filmed the episode at the annual Halloween Harvest Festival at Los Angeles Pierce College, a community college in California. Michael Schur said the aerial shot of the harvest festival at the end of the episode was the most expensive in the entire series. The episode was filmed out of sequence from the rest of the season so the weather would be cooler when the scenes were shot; Schur jokingly said if this was not done, "the week that we would have been shooting it was like 148 degrees here and the actors would be dead now". "Harvest Festival" was screened for members of the media during a January 2011 NBC press junket. Afterward, the reporters were taken to the set of Parks and Recreation where they were able to greet and pose for photos with the actual miniature horse who played Li'l Sebastian. Shortly after the episode aired, a "Producer's Cut" version was made available on the official NBC website. It was about five minutes longer than the televised version and included several scenes that were originally cut due to length limitations, including an extended cold open with the parks department meeting Li'l Sebastian, and additional scenes of Leslie meeting with Pawnee constituents before the Harvest Festival.

== Cultural references ==
When Ben fails to understand the appeal of Li'l Sebastian, Ron explains the miniature horse has an honorary degree from the University of Notre Dame, a school in Indiana, the state where Parks and Recreation series is set. In a later scene, Ben compares Leslie to a Jedi, a type of warrior in the science fiction franchise Star Wars, prompting Leslie and Tom to mock him as a nerd. During one scene, Ken Hotate says, "I know two things about white people: they love Matchbox Twenty, and they are terrified of curses." The former refers to an American rock band, which is later also featured on the marquee of an exterior shot of a Wamapoke casino. (The extended cut replaces Matchbox Twenty with Rachael Ray in both instances.) Ann claims that, while distraught from her breakup with Chris, she bought $700-worth of candles from Anthropologie, a retail store that sells women's apparel and home accessories.

One of the harvest festival booths features Pawnee celebrity Aunt Tilda, the fictional aunt of basketball player Larry Bird, who is from Indiana. "American Girl", a song by the rock band Tom Petty and the Heartbreakers, plays during one scene showing an overview of the harvest festival. A news report about the supposed curse is presented in a Taiwanese animation clip featuring Leslie and Ken Hotate, in the style of the animation company Next Media Animation. While interviewing Hotate, Perd Hapley compared the curse to the horror film Poltergeist (1982). Several commentators compared the man who flirted with Ann to the characters of Jersey Shore, an MTV reality series about young people living in a house by the Jersey Shore beach.

== Reception ==
=== Ratings ===
In its original American broadcast, "Harvest Festival" was seen by an estimated 4.08 million household viewers, according to Nielsen Media Research, with a 1.8 rating/5 share among viewers between ages 18 and 49. It was one of the lowest ratings of the series to date, and marked a 25 percent drop from the previous original episode, "Indianapolis". The ratings suffered in part because its lead-in show, The Office, was a repeat; all the other NBC comedy shows that Thursday, including 30 Rock, Community, Perfect Couples and Outsourced, also saw lower ratings than their previous episodes. Parks and Recreation was defeated in its 9:30 p.m. timeslot by the Fox comedy-drama series Bones, which was seen by 11.34 million households; the ABC medical drama Private Practice, which was seen by 5.97 million households; and CBS coverage of NCAA basketball, which was seen by 4.44 million households. In network television, it defeated only a remake of the CW Network drama Nikita, which drew 1.37 million households.

=== Reviews ===
What's remarkable about Parks and Recreation is how it manages to be funny without resorting to cruel, cutting humour. It's gentle and disarming, yet manages to be wry and witty at the same time.

— Alex Strachan, Montreal Gazette

"Harvest Festival" received critical acclaim. New York magazine writer Steve Kandell called it the most pivotal episode of the season in terms of "resolving and resetting narrative stakes", as well as the most complex from a production perspective. Kandell wrote, "There's something that feels particularly satisfying about watching a wholly sympathetic, albeit fictional, character like Leslie Knope do well by her own ambition and by her friends." Entertainment Weekly writer Ken Tucker said the episode placed Parks and Recreation "squarely in the tradition of great gentle-hearted sitcoms" that treated its characters "with equal affection, and has relatively little patience for irony and cool detachment". He praised Amy Poehler's performance, and enjoyed how the characters' excitement over Li'l Sebastian demonstrated how "in some parts of this great land, there are people who aren’t jaded, who are open to wonderment, who find vessels in which to pour their joy". HitFix writer Alan Sepinwall said "Harvest Festival" may be his favorite episode of the season thus far, and demonstrates how the series has evolved. While in the first season he said Leslie was too over-the-top in a relatively ordinary setting, Sepinwall said this episode showed Parks and Recreation "has successfully made the rest of Pawnee seem as believably crazy as Leslie, if not more so". TV Squad television reviewer Maureen Ryan called "Harvest Festival" a "delightful, comedically deft episode, one that depicts the mildly demented world of Pawnee in loving detail".

Joel Keller, also of TV Squad, called it one of the best episodes of the season, and that it provided each member of the ensemble cast moments to shine. He praised how the episode combined the "funny small-townness of a place like Pawnee and the realities of being in city government". James Poniewozik of Time magazine called it a "splendid" episode that "combined slapstick, authentic stakes and a holistic picture of the oddball history and commonalities that bond the folks we've come to know in Pawnee". Punchline Magazine writer Megan Gilbert said the episode featured "plenty of laugh-out-loud moments" and particularly enjoyed the "sweet non-aggressive fighting" between April and Andy. Gilbert felt Adam Scott was underused, but praised the performances of Rashida Jones, Aziz Ansari and Mo Collins. TV Guide writer Damian Holbrook said the difficulties that plague the harvest festival were funny, "but like the best of Parks, these hiccups are matched with acres of heart". He praised the growing romantic interest between Leslie and Ben, as well as the subplot about Andy and April. Alex Strachan of the Montreal Gazette praised the show for being funny without resorting to cynicism or cruel jokes, and called the series "one of the sharpest, smartest comedies on TV at the moment". He also called the Wamapoke curse subplot "wildly politically incorrect, but funny". National Post writer Scott Stinson said Parks and Recreation "continues to challenge for the title of best comedy on television", and called the continuing romance between April and Andy a "welcome development" for both characters.

Hollywood.com writer Eric Sundermann enjoyed the new direction Ann's character was taking, as well as how "Harvest Festival" accurately portrays small-town life. Rick Porter of Zap2it said the episode "put a great cap on the first portion of the season". He called Andy and April "a recipe for excellent comedy" and called the slowly developing romance of Ben and Leslie extremely rewarding. Andy Daglas of ChicagoNow called it a "pure delight from beginning to end" and a good entry point for newcomers to the show. Steve Heisler of The A.V. Club called the episode "celebration of the whackjobs that live in Pawnee and how their singular focus can make for some adorably naive comedy". While he praised the main subplot, he said it was too early in April and Andy's relationship for them to declare their love for each other, and said April's declaration "came out of nowhere". Matt Fowler of IGN said it was not his favorite episode, as the jokes about Ben's past felt repetitive compared to past episodes, and the April and Andy subplot "fell a little flat". However, he said it was "chock full of dozens of little moments that make the entire episode worthwhile", and particularly praised the Native American curse and the parody of the media.
