= Indianapolis (Parks and Recreation) =

- Parks and Recreation episode
- Episode no.: Season 3 Episode 6
- Directed by: Randall Einhorn
- Written by: Katie Dippold
- Original air date: February 24, 2011

Guest appearances
- Tim Acres as Bartender #1; Nick Armstrong as Craig; Jon Barinholtz as Kevin; Nick Holmes as Sterp; Jason Mantzoukas as Dennis Feinstein; Andy Milder as Freddy; Mike Mitchell as Bjorn; Staci Roberts as Bartender #2

Episode chronology
| ← Previous "Media Blitz" | Next → "Harvest Festival" |
- Parks and Recreation season 3

"Indianapolis" is the sixth episode of the third season of the American comedy television series Parks and Recreation, and the 36th overall episode of the series. It originally aired on NBC in the United States on February 24, 2011. In the episode, Leslie and Ron travel to Indianapolis to receive a commendation, while Ann suspects Chris is cheating on her. Meanwhile, Tom tries to pitch his personal fragrance to a cologne maker while simultaneously bonding with Ben.

Written by Katie Dippold and directed by Randall Einhorn, "Indianapolis" was the last of six episodes filmed almost immediately after the second season ended as part of an early shooting schedule needed to accommodate actress Amy Poehler's pregnancy. The episodes were ultimately held for several months due to a scheduling hiatus. It was originally intended to be the last episode featuring guest star Rob Lowe, but he became a permanent cast member after it was filmed.

The episode features a guest appearance by actor Jason Mantzoukas as fragrance maker Dennis Feinstein. According to Nielsen Media Research, "Indianapolis" was seen by 4.59 million household viewers, an increase in viewership from the previous week's episode, "Media Blitz". The episode received generally positive reviews.

== Plot ==
Leslie and Ron head up to Indianapolis to receive a commendation at the Indiana Statehouse for reestablishing the Pawnee Harvest Festival, although Ron is only interested in eating at Charles Mulligan's Steak House, his favorite restaurant. Ann tells Leslie her last talk with Chris reassured her their relationship was fine, but he has been acting distant since then. She asks Leslie to look for signs of whether Chris is cheating on her, since he has since returned to Indianapolis.

Tom is attending a launch party for cologne maker Dennis Feinstein at the Snakehole Lounge, where Tom hopes to pitch his own cologne "Tommy Fresh" to him. Ben initially turns down the invitation because he does not want to get too attached to anybody, since his job will require him move soon. However, Ben relents when Tom invites him again at Leslie's urging (Ben also notes that "Dennis Feinstein" is an oddly ordinary name for a cologne designer, but Tom explains that Dennis' real name, "Dante Fiero", is considered less exotic here). Meanwhile, April and Andy are now dating, but Andy is worried he is too broke to take her out.

Leslie and Ron visit Chris' apartment, where Leslie discovers a woman's razor and a pink swimming cap in the bathroom. Upon hearing this, Ann decides to drive up to Indianapolis to confront Chris. To Ron's horror, Charles Mulligan's has been shut down by Indiana's health department, so Chris invites everyone back to his place for food. To Ron's further horror, Chris prepares vegetarian dishes, and Ron nearly passes out as he had been starving himself with the expectation of eating at Mulligan's. At the launch party, Tom approaches Dennis, who insults "Tommy Fresh" and quickly dismisses Tom. Ben cheers him up and tells him not to give up on his dreams, admitting that he considers Tom his friend. Ben is happy when it is apparent that the parks department feels the same way. Andy and April, who are both broke, hold a contest to see how much free stuff they can get at the party, earning $218 by posing as staff and accepting tips. However, they both feel guilty and give the money to the bartender.

Ann eventually shows up at Chris' apartment and lashes out at him, but he explains he shaves his legs with the razor for swimming, and the pink shower cap was for swimming in a breast cancer awareness triathlon. However, he tells Ann they broke up last week during their talk; Ann realizes that Chris was so positive in how he ended the relationship that she was totally oblivious to it. Leslie decides not to attend the commendation ceremony so she can drive Ann home that night, cheering her up during the trip by telling her all the numerous embarrassing ways she has been dumped over the years. They end up at the Snakehole Lounge for the party to rendezvous with everyone else. As they all leave the party, Ben avenges Tom by pouring "Tommy Fresh" all over the inside of Dennis' parked SUV. Meanwhile, a starving Ron goes to a diner and, after being disappointed by the steak he orders, tells the waiter, "Give me all the bacon and eggs you have".

== Production ==
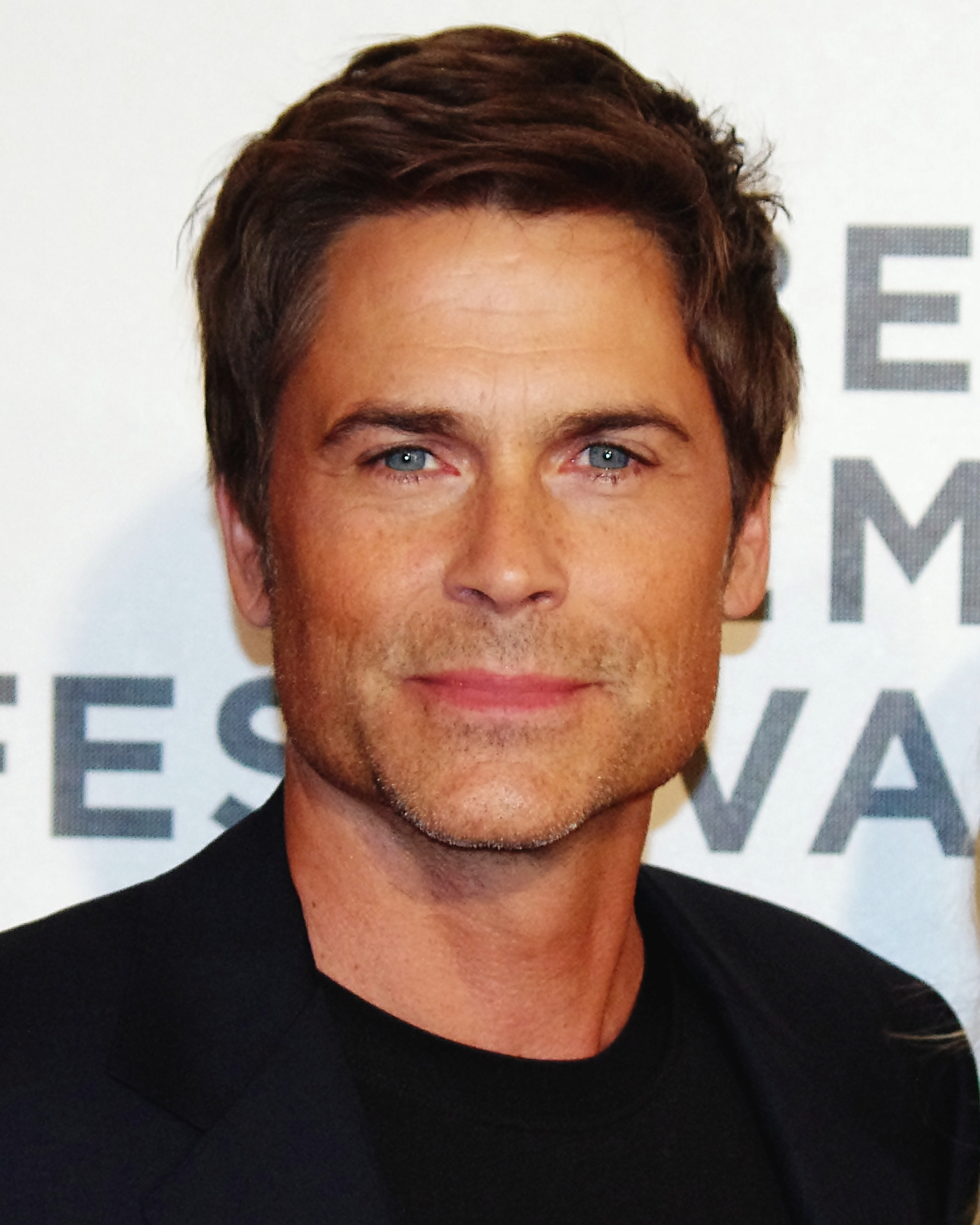
"Indianapolis" was originally expected to be the final episode featuring Rob Lowe (pictured), before he signed on as a permanent cast member.

"Indianapolis" was written by Katie Dippold and directed by Randall Einhorn. It was the last of six third season episodes that were written and filmed almost immediately after the second season ended as part of an early shooting schedule needed to accommodate Amy Poehler's pregnancy. However, although finished early in anticipation of a September 2010 release date, the series' third season was ultimately placed on hiatus until early 2011, many months after production on "Indianapolis" was finished. The episode "Time Capsule" was actually the last of the six to be filmed because it afforded the most opportunities for actress Amy Poehler to conceal her pregnant belly behind a variety of props, but "Indianapolis" as planned was the sixth episode of the season. Because of this, "Time Capsule" has an "easter egg" reference to the character Dennis Feinstein on the time capsule idea sheet before he appears in the show later in the season. "Indianapolis" was originally expected to be the final episode starring Rob Lowe, who was first scheduled to make only a string of guest appearances throughout the third season. However, after the episode was filmed, Lowe was signed as a permanent Parks and Recreation cast member, so his character returned in future episodes.

Jason Mantzoukas made a guest appearance in "Indianapolis" as the fragrance maker Dennis Feinstein. The character and some of his fragrance brands have been mentioned in previous Parks and Recreation episodes, but this marked his first on-screen appearance. Mantzoukas portrays the character Rafi in the FX comedy series The League; he is the third actor from that show to appear on Parks and Recreation, as Nick Kroll previously guest-starred in the episode "Media Blitz", and Paul Scheer appeared in the episode "Kaboom". "Indianapolis" included a scene in which Leslie comforts Ann with stories about multiple times Leslie was dumped in the past, all of which were edited together in a series of jump cuts. The technique has been commonly used throughout the series to condense multiple takes of improvisation from Poehler.

== Cultural references ==
Tom said Blackout, one of Dennis Feinstein's fragrances, was named one of the "top 100 ways to trick someone into sex" by Maxim, an international men's magazine. While proposing possible date activities to April, Andy suggests watching television at Best Buy, a consumer electronics retailer store. While describing one of his past meals at the steakhouse restaurant, Ron recalled having drunk a 16-year-old Lagavulin Single Malt, a type of Scotch whisky. Ben claims that his signature drink is Miller Lite, a very common brand of lager beer. Leslie reveals her nickname in high school was Angela Lansbury, an actress best known for her role on the television series Murder, She Wrote. Ben says because he moves around so much due to work, he does not become close with many people, and considers the acquaintances he makes the equivalent of Facebook friends, a reference to the social network service website.

== Reception ==
=== Ratings ===
In its original American broadcast, "Indianapolis" was seen by an estimated 4.59 million household viewers, according to Nielsen Media Research, with an overall 2.7 rating/4 share, and a 2.4 rating/6 share among viewers between ages 18 and 49. It constituted a 9 percent increase over the previous week's episode "Media Blitz", which was seen by 4.33 million households. Along with 30 Rock, Parks was the only show from the NBC Thursday comedy block on February 24 to see an increase in ratings over the previous week: Community, Perfect Couples, Outsourced and The Office were all flat, with the latter two shows matching their lowest ratings of the season. Parks and Recreation was outperformed in its 9:30 p.m. timeslot by the Fox reality series American Idol and the CBS crime drama series CSI: Crime Scene Investigation, which were seen by an average 21.82 million and 12.48 million household viewers, respectively. "Indianapolis", however, earned higher ratings than the CW Network drama series Nikita, which was seen by 3.4 million household viewers.

=== Reviews ===
"Indianapolis" was a clever joyride that took most of our gang out of the office and into the wonderful, lovable world that this show has created for itself. ... I love that each character has their own specific eccentricities (or peculiarities, if you will), and this episode was able to highlight three of them.

— Matt Fowler, IGN

"Indianapolis" received generally positive reviews. The Atlantic writer Scott Meslow called it "a very funny, very sweet episode of a show that's been consistently great this season". Meslow said the transition of April and Andy from courting to dating was handled especially well, and liked how the Ben and Tom subplot allowed Ben's character to "loosen up a little", but said Ron's character seemed too much like a "self-parody" in the episode. Alan Sepinwall of Hitfix said the episode reminded him of the first season finale "Rock Show", which he called "the show that was capable of living up to the talent in front of and behind the camera". Sepinwall said the characters were now so well-developed that he enjoyed simply getting to "hang out with them", and he particularly liked the rapport between Tom and Ben, the latter of whom he said was becoming better integrated into the cast. IGN writer said the episode perfectly highlighted all the characters various eccentricities, and enjoyed that the show took the characters out of the usual parks department office setting and placed them into the "wonderful, lovable world that this show has created for itself".

Steve Heisler of The A.V. Club called the episode "one of the finest in this first season three batch and a solid showcase for all the characters". He praised the show for going in directions atypical for sitcoms, like having the Ann and Chris break-up off-screen, and said "Ann's character defies all the expectations heaped on her from two previous seasons". Steve Kandell of New York magazine said "Indianapolis" was not as strong as other third-season episodes, but that it "proves to be as emblematic of the show's soft, gooey heart as any the series has done". In particular, Kandell praised how Ben is growing to love Pawnee, and how April and Andy donated their tips at the end of the episode. Hollywood.com writer Eric Sundermann said the writers took "some risks outside of the characters' comfort zone" in "Indianapolis" and that they worked, especially with Ann's character, who he felt opened up more than in past episodes. He also said Andy and April work well together because the characters seem so genuine with each other. Matt Richenthal of TV Fanatic declared "Indianapolis" a great episode. He particularly enjoyed the April and Andy date, which he called, "downright adorable", and the Ron Swanson subplot, which he called "so ridiculous and hilarious".

Rick Porter of Zap2it called the episode a "pretty low-key affair" and "a nice pause in the harvest festival story". Porter praised Rashida Jones' performance and said Adam Scott and Aziz Ansari played well off each other. Joel Keller of TV Squad called the steakhouse subplot "Ron Swanson at his best" and enjoyed the Andy and April scenes, but said he did not like how the Ann and Chris romance had been handled throughout the season, and hoped it would end with "Indianapolis". Entertainment Weekly writer Hillary Busis said she liked seeing Ben interact with characters other than Leslie, and enjoyed the development between Ann and Chris. However, Busis found the other subplots of the episode "a little flimsy" and found it lacking compared to recent episodes like "Ron and Tammy: Part Two" and "Media Blitz".
