= Parks and Recreation season 3 =

Parks and Recreation
- Season 3
- DVD cover art
- Showrunner: Michael Schur
- Starring: Amy Poehler; Rashida Jones; Aziz Ansari; Nick Offerman; Aubrey Plaza; Chris Pratt; Adam Scott; Rob Lowe; Jim O'Heir; Retta
- No. of episodes: 16

Release
- Original network: NBC
- Original release: January 20 – May 19, 2011

Season chronology
- ← Previous; Season 2 Next → Season 4

The third season of Parks and Recreation originally aired in the United States on the NBC television network between January 20 and May 19, 2011. Like the previous seasons, it focuses on Leslie Knope (Amy Poehler) and her staff at the parks and recreation department of the fictional Indiana town of Pawnee. The season featured 16 episodes, most of which were approximately 22 minutes long each and aired at 9:30 p.m. on Thursdays. The season stars Amy Poehler, Rashida Jones, Aziz Ansari, Nick Offerman, Aubrey Plaza, Chris Pratt, Adam Scott, and Rob Lowe, with supporting performances from Jim O'Heir and Retta.

All of the members of the original cast returned for the third season except Paul Schneider, who previously played city planner Mark Brendanawicz. Rob Lowe and Adam Scott, who appeared as guest stars in the second season, began season three as regular cast members playing Chris Traeger and Ben Wyatt, respectively. The season also featured guest appearances by Megan Mullally, Will Forte and Parker Posey, among others.

To accommodate Amy Poehler's pregnancy, the first six episodes of the third season were filmed immediately after season two wrapped so they could be saved for a projected an air date for September 2010. However, after the episodes were finished, NBC postponed the season premiere until January to accommodate their new series, Outsourced. The third season consisted of several major story arcs, including a complete shutdown of the Pawnee government for budgetary reasons, inspired by the Great Recession. Other storylines included the parks department's organization of a harvest festival, a romance between Leslie and Ben, and the dating and eventual marriage of Andy Dwyer (Chris Pratt) and April Ludgate (Aubrey Plaza).

As in the previous season, Parks and Recreation was critically acclaimed during its third season, and was declared by several reviewers to be one of the best comedies on television. Entertainment Weekly featured it on its cover in February 2011 and declared it "the smartest comedy on TV". The episodes "Harvest Festival" and "Li'l Sebastian" received particularly positive reviews, as did Nick Offerman in his role as parks director Ron Swanson. Parks and Recreation received its first nomination for Primetime Emmy Award for Outstanding Comedy Series for its third season, and Poehler received her second nomination for Outstanding Lead Actress in a Comedy Series. Nevertheless, Parks and Recreation continued to struggle in the Nielsen ratings and averaged about 4.75 million household viewers per week.

== Cast ==
=== Main ===
- Amy Poehler as Leslie Knope
- Rashida Jones as Ann Perkins
- Aziz Ansari as Tom Haverford
- Nick Offerman as Ron Swanson
- Aubrey Plaza as April Ludgate
- Chris Pratt as Andy Dwyer
- Adam Scott as Ben Wyatt
- Rob Lowe as Chris Traeger

=== Starring ===
- Jim O'Heir as Jerry Gergich
- Retta as Donna Meagle

== Episodes ==
^{†} denotes an extended episode.

Parks and Recreation, season 3 episodes
No. overall	No. in season	Title	Directed by	Written by	Original release date	U.S. viewers (millions)
31	1	"Go Big or Go Home"	Dean Holland	Alan Yang	January 20, 2011	6.14
Leslie (Amy Poehler) and the parks department return to work after three months, only to be told by state auditors Chris (Rob Lowe) and Ben (Adam Scott) that the budget crisis still looms. After unsuccessfully trying to have their budget restored by using Ann (Rashida Jones) to seduce Chris with a date, Leslie decides to make an all or nothing play by resurrecting the Pawnee harvest festival. Either the festival is a financial success, or the parks Department will be eliminated. After their bad date, Ann apologizes to Chris and asks to go out again, and he accepts. Meanwhile, Ben restarts the youth basketball league and instates Ron (Nick Offerman) and Andy (Chris Pratt) to coach the only two teams. Tom (Aziz Ansari) referees, but gives preferential treatment to Andy out of jealousy that Ron is dating Tom's ex-wife, Wendy (Jama Williamson). April, still angry with Andy for having kissed Ann, returns from a vacation with a new boyfriend from Venezuela, Eduardo. A disappointed Andy vows to win her back.
32	2	"Flu Season"	Wendey Stanzler	Norm Hiscock	January 27, 2011	5.83
Flu season strikes Pawnee, and Ann must care for the flu victims at the hospital, which include April, Leslie, and Chris. While April tries to make life hard for Ann as revenge for kissing Andy, Ron needs an assistant to fill in for April and selects Andy, whom he bonds with over the Colts, lunch, and playing football in the parking lot. Ann finds out Leslie stole April and Chris' flu medicine to go make her speech to convince business owners to donate items for the Harvest Festival with Ben, who tries to get her to return to the hospital. However to Ben and Tom's surprise, Leslie makes a flawless speech. Tom tries to squirm out of working on the speech to go hot tubbing at a club, which they discover is essential, since the three old guys he hot tubs with own car dealerships and they've offered to donate cars for the festival. Ann must care for Chris, who is so healthy, his immune system and 2.8% body fat makes him very weak and prone to disease. Ironically, Chris gets the flu and is bedridden to the joy of Ann. Chris recovers and asks Ben if he should prolong their stay in Pawnee instead of returning to Indianapolis. They decide to prolong their stay.
33	3	"Time Capsule"	Michael Schur	Michael Schur	February 3, 2011	4.95
Leslie's plans to bury a time capsule in Pawnee are derailed when local man Kelly (Will Forte) chains himself to a pipe in Leslie's office because she refuses to include the Twilight novel in the capsule. Eventually Leslie holds a public forum to decide what will go in the capsule, but it grows quickly out of control when the Pawnee citizens cannot agree on what it should include. Leslie resolves the matter by including nothing but a video-recording of the meeting, which she feels captures Pawnee by showing the passion of its citizens. Meanwhile, Andy gets help from Chris in winning back April, which makes Ann worry that Andy will once again interfere in her relationship. Tom laments that his girlfriend Lucy (Natalie Morales) has broken up with him, and she reveals she left Tom because he cannot get over his jealousy of Ron and Wendy.
34	4	"Ron & Tammy: Part Two"	Tucker Gates	Emily Kapnek	February 10, 2011	5.03
Just as Ron and Wendy break up when Wendy decides to move back to Canada, Ron's ex-wife Tammy (Megan Mullally) returns to try to make Ron's life miserable. Tom, still angry about Ron dating Wendy, brings Tammy to a date to make Ron jealous. Instead, Ron and Tammy reconnect and end up remarrying each other in the middle of a night of drinking and wild sex that leaves them both in prison. Leslie asks Pawnee police Chief Hugh Trumple (Eric Pierpoint) to release Ron as a favor, even though the favor she originally planned to ask was for the police to volunteer officers for security as the harvest festival. Later, Ben asks the chief for that favor as well, and he agrees out of respect for Leslie. Tom tries to stop Ron from proceeding with Tammy, which causes Tammy to beat him senseless. Realizing Tammy is still a horrible woman, Ron breaks up with her. Meanwhile, April fills in as Chris' assistant and, impressed with her, he asks April to work with him in Indianapolis, much to the chagrin of Ann and Andy.
35	5	"Media Blitz"	David Rogers	Harris Wittels	February 17, 2011	4.33
Leslie, Ben and Tom conduct a series of television, radio and newspaper interviews to promote the harvest festival. However, during one interview, Ben is confronted about his past as an 18-year-old mayor, during which he made his city go bankrupt. The socially awkward Ben struggles to respond to these questions, and the story becomes increasingly about him rather than the harvest festival. With Leslie's encouragement, however, Ben finds his confidence and insists his mistakes are in the past, which steers the coverage back to the festival. Meanwhile, Andy struggles to do everything April hates with the hopes of stopping her from moving to Indianapolis. After Ron encourages April to stop stringing Andy along, she finally forgives Andy and kisses him. Meanwhile, Ann and Chris agree they must sort out the future of their relationship before Chris moves back to Indianapolis.
36	6	"Indianapolis"	Randall Einhorn	Katie Dippold	February 24, 2011	4.59
Ron and Leslie head to Indianapolis to receive a commendation for reviving the harvest festival. Before they leave, Ann confides in Leslie that she thinks Chris might be cheating on her. Leslie searches Chris' house for clues, which prompts Ann to come to Indianapolis herself to confront Chris. However, Ann is humiliated to learn Chris previously broke up with her, but did so in such a positive way that she did not realize it. Meanwhile, Tom and Ben bond at a club where Tom hopes to pitch his cologne, "Tommy Fresh", to fragrance mogul Dennis Feinstein (Jason Mantzoukas). Ben comforts Tom after Feinstein rejects and insults Tom's fragrance. Meanwhile, at the same bar, April and Andy compete to see who can win the most free stuff.
37	7	"Harvest Festival"^{†}	Dean Holland	Dan Goor	March 17, 2011	4.08
The day of the harvest festival has arrived and everything seems to be going well. However, when a local Native American tribe leader (Jonathan Joss) is offended by the festival's location (on the site of a battle where members of his tribe were brutally murdered by white colonizers), the local press becomes fixated on the story of a supposed curse on the festival. To make matters worse, Li'l Sebastian, Pawnee's beloved celebrity miniature horse goes missing on Tom's watch. The bad press risks keeping visitors away from the festival, but things get straightened out when Li'l Sebastian is found and Leslie makes peace with the tribe leader. Meanwhile, April tells Andy she loves him, but is displeased when Andy replies, "Awesome-sauce!" instead of "I love you." She later learns, however, that this is Andy's way of expressing love.
38	8	"Camping"	Rob Schrab	Aisha Muharrar	March 24, 2011	5.15
City manager Paul (Phil Reeves) suffers a massive heart attack, and Chris returns from Indianapolis to serve as acting city manager. Fresh off her harvest festival success, Leslie takes the parks department (along with Ann) on a camping trip to brainstorm ideas for their next big project. April is less than enthused about having to be out in the open and recruits Andy to keep her entertained, but he gets lost in the wilderness. Tom and Ben equip their tent with Tom's luxury and electronic items from Sky Mall, the powering of which drains the battery on the van and leaves the crew stranded. They seek refuge at a nearby bed and breakfast, where Leslie laments that she has no ideas for their next project and is worrying that she is a one-hit wonder. Ron solves her problem by forcing her to have a good night's sleep and she awakens fresh with numerous big-project ideas.
39	9	"Andy and April's Fancy Party"	Michael Trim	Katie Dippold	April 14, 2011	5.16
Andy and April invite all their friends and family to a dinner party, which turns out to be their secret wedding. Fearing they are moving too fast, Leslie tries to stop it, but Ron assures her that Andy and April need to make their own decisions. Tom is thrilled to be named best man, but is discouraged when he learns Andy has several "best men". Ben debates whether or not to return to his old job or take a job offered to him by Chris in Pawnee. Leslie encourages him to stay, which he does. Meanwhile, Ann attends a singles mixer but acts awkwardly until she receives dating advice from Donna (Retta).
40	10	"Soulmates"	Ken Whittingham	Alan Yang	April 21, 2011	4.88
Leslie is disappointed when she asks Ben out on a date and he turns her down. Ann convinces her to sign up with an online dating service, but the website surprisingly matches Leslie up with Tom. Determined to find out why they are supposedly a match, Leslie takes Tom out to lunch, which proves to be disastrous. Tom relentlessly teases Leslie and reveals he has multiple accounts at the site with the hopes of attracting all types of women. Leslie is later relieved to learn Ben only turned her down because Chris has a strict policy against office relationships. Meanwhile, Chris tries to impose a health initiative in Pawnee, which starts by banning red meat from the cafeteria. To prevent this, Ron challenges Chris to a cook-off between Chris' lean turkey burgers and Ron's traditional hamburger, the latter of which ends up the winner.
41	11	"Jerry's Painting"^{†}	Dean Holland	Norm Hiscock	April 28, 2011	4.71
Feeling frustrated and powerless because of her situation with Ben, Leslie finds strength in a painting Jerry (Jim O'Heir) contributes to a community art show, which depicts her as a powerful and bare-chested Greek goddess. The painting immediately causes a stir and prompts calls for it to be destroyed, which Leslie emphatically protests. Tom supports destruction of the painting, which depicts him as a pot-bellied cherub. Ben gets tired of living in a hotel and moves in with April and Andy, only to discover the place is filthy and they do not know how to take care of themselves. He resolves to teach them how to be adults, which April initially resists because she does not want to lose her individuality. Leslie eventually swaps the painting with a duplicate Jerry makes, that depicts Tom as the Greek god, and allows Leslie to keep the empowering portrait.
42	12	"Eagleton"	Nicole Holofcener	Emily Spivey	May 5, 2011	5.06
Lindsay Carlisle Shay (Parker Posey), the parks director from the prosperous neighboring city of Eagleton, antagonizes her former best friend Leslie by building a large fence to divide a park within both city limits. Leslie appeals the decision to an Eagleton public forum, but the rich and snobbish residents agree with the fence due to their distaste for Pawnee. After getting into a garbage fight with Lindsay that lands them both in jail, Leslie turns the situation into a positive one by assembling a wiffle ball team that makes use of the fence. Meanwhile, Leslie has found out it is Ron's birthday, a fact that he went to extreme lengths to conceal, and Leslie plans a party against his wishes. However, she surprises him by throwing not a huge birthday bash, but an appropriate one for Ron: time alone with steak, whisky and his favorite movies.
43	13	"The Fight"^{†}	Randall Einhorn	Amy Poehler	May 12, 2011	4.55
A job opens up with the health department and Leslie immediately recommends Ann, who is unenthusiastic about having to leave her nursing job and the amount of prep work there is for the interview the next day. When the parks department comes out to the Snakehole Lounge bar for the debut of Tom's new drink "Snake Juice", Leslie sees that Ann has blown off her preparation work to go out dancing. The two get in their first major fight, while everyone else gets extremely drunk from Tom's drink. The next day, with Ben's help, a regretful Ann and Leslie make amends, and Ann receives the part-time city hall job. Meanwhile, Chris forces Tom to sell his shares in the Snakehole Lounge because it conflicts with his government job, much to Tom's disappointment.
44	14	"Road Trip"	Troy Miller	Harris Wittels	May 12, 2011	3.54
Chris sends Leslie and Ben on an assignment to Indianapolis, and Leslie is unsure she can keep from acting on her feelings for Ben in such close quarters. The assignment proves a success and Leslie and Ben appear on the verge of getting together, but Chris surprises them by showing up to celebrate their success. Although Chris' constant interruptions spoil the mood, Leslie and Ben secretly kiss each other after getting back to Pawnee. Meanwhile, Tom invents a new game show entitled Know Ya Boo, a rip-off of The Newlywed Game, and tests it out on April, Andy, Donna and Jerry. The game causes a big fight when April reveals she likes another band more than Andy's, and April reluctantly seeks advice from Ann about how to make amends with him. April ends the fight and proves her appreciation for Andy by performing one of his songs in city hall.
45	15	"The Bubble"	Matt Sohn	Greg Levine & Brian Rowe	May 19, 2011	4.27
Leslie and Ben are reveling in "the bubble", the beginning stage of a relationship when everything is simple and fun. That is threatened, however, when Leslie's notoriously tough mother Marlene (Pamela Reed), a Pawnee politician, meets with Ben to discuss a business request. Leslie initially makes Ben nervous for the meeting and Marlene believes him to be weak. When Leslie tries to prepare him for a follow-up meeting, Ben is so confident that Marlene ends up becoming attracted to him herself. Fed up, Ben admits he is secretly dating Leslie, much to Marlene's amusement. Meanwhile, Chris instigates changes to the parks department, that include making Tom work on city hall's dreaded "fourth floor", which frustrates him. The changes prove counter-productive, and Ron approaches Chris with a compromise that puts almost everything back to normal.
46	16	"Li'l Sebastian"^{†}	Dean Holland	Dan Goor	May 19, 2011	3.72
Pawnee's favorite miniature horse, Li'l Sebastian, dies and the parks department organizes a memorial service. The extremely health-conscious Chris learns he has tendonitis and takes it very badly, but is comforted by Ann. Leslie and Ben have trouble keeping their relationship secret, and their efforts to do so causes problems with Li'l Sebastian's eternal flame that nearly kill Ron with a fireball. Tom and his friend Jean-Ralphio successfully organize Li'l Sebastian's service, and Andy comes up with an amazing memorial song. Tom finally hands in his letter of resignation to Ron, who sadly accepts it and bids farewell to him. After the service, Ron is taunted by his ex-wife Tammy, but both are horrified to learn his first ex-wife, also named Tammy, has arrived in town. Leslie is approached to possibly consider running for elected office, but when asked about any potential scandals, she neglects to admit to her secret affair with Ben.

== Production ==
=== Cast ===
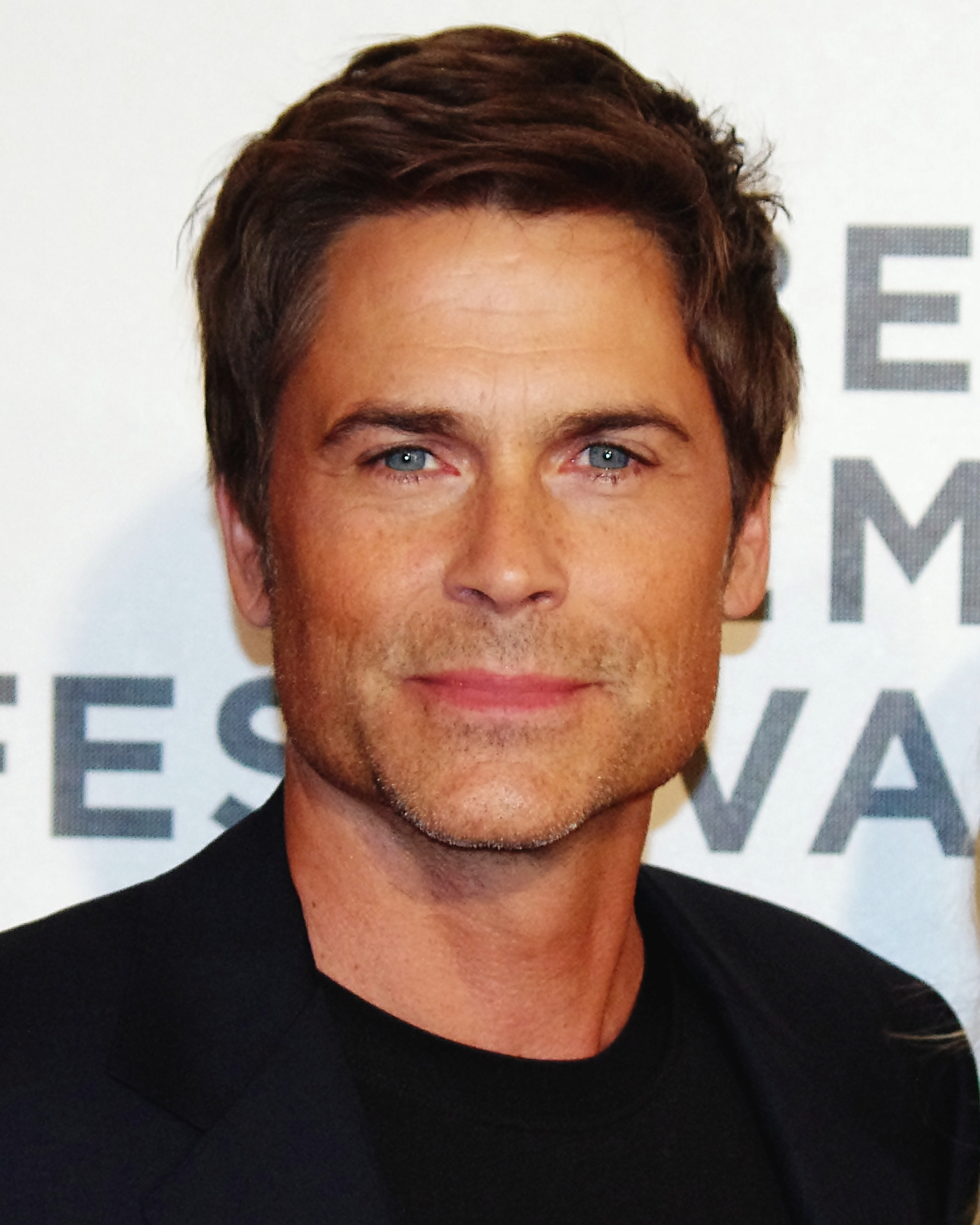
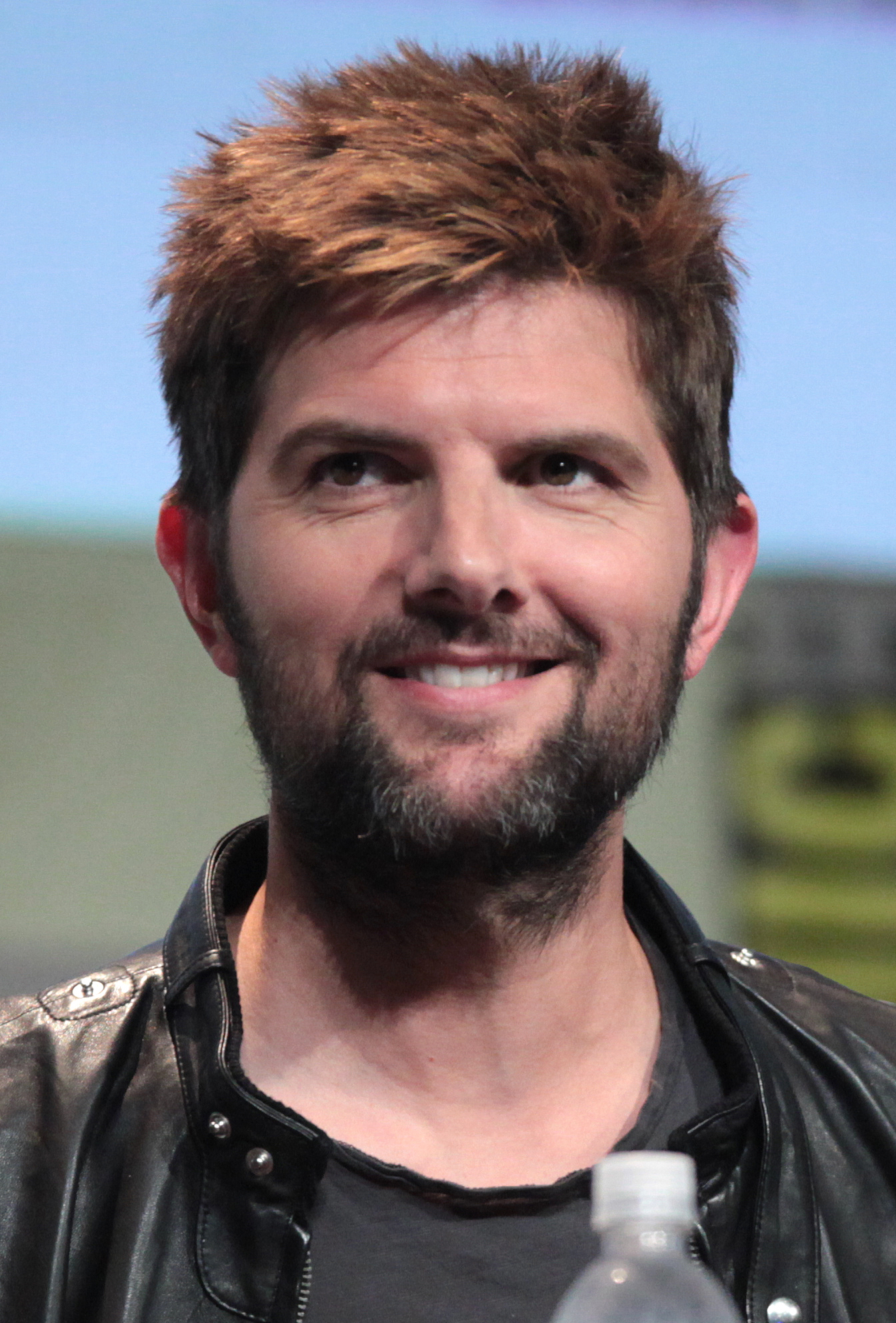
Rob Lowe (left) and Adam Scott (right) joined the cast of Parks and Recreation during the last two episodes of the second season.

Almost the entire original cast from season two returned for the third season, including Amy Poehler, Rashida Jones, Aziz Ansari, Nick Offerman, Aubrey Plaza and Chris Pratt. The only permanent cast member not to return was Paul Schneider, who previously played city planner Mark Brendanawicz. Schneider departed from the series at the end of season two. Jim O'Heir and Retta, who made regular appearances as parks employees Jerry Gergich and Donna Meagle during the first two seasons, were considered members of the regular cast starting in season three, although they still do not appear in the opening credits. Adam Scott, who portrayed state auditor Ben Wyatt in the final two episodes of the second season, became a regular cast member starting in season three, and Rob Lowe, who appeared in the same two second-season episodes as state auditor Chris Traeger, also joined the cast in season three. Lowe was originally meant only to make a string of performances in seasons two and three and then depart the show, but he instead become a regular cast member starting with the third season, having signed a multi-year contract to remain on the show. After actor Charlie Sheen was fired from the CBS comedy series Two and a Half Men in March 2011, rumors circulated that Rob Lowe would depart Parks and Recreation and replace Sheen, but they proved unfounded.

Nick Offerman's wife Megan Mullally, who previously played Ron Swanson's ex-wife Tammy in the episode "Ron and Tammy", reprised that role in "Ron & Tammy: Part Two", and briefly appeared as the character in the season finale "Li'l Sebastian". Will Forte, a comedian who previously starred on the sketch comedy series Saturday Night Live along with Amy Poehler, guest-starred in "Time Capsule" as a Pawnee resident demanding the Twilight books be added to the town's time capsule. Parker Posey, who previously starred with Poehler in the 2009 comedy film Spring Breakdown, appeared in "Eagleton" as Leslie's former best friend and rival official from a neighboring town. Posey had been in discussions with the Parks and Recreation staff to make a guest appearance since the show debuted, and grew frustrated when it took several months before she received an invitation.

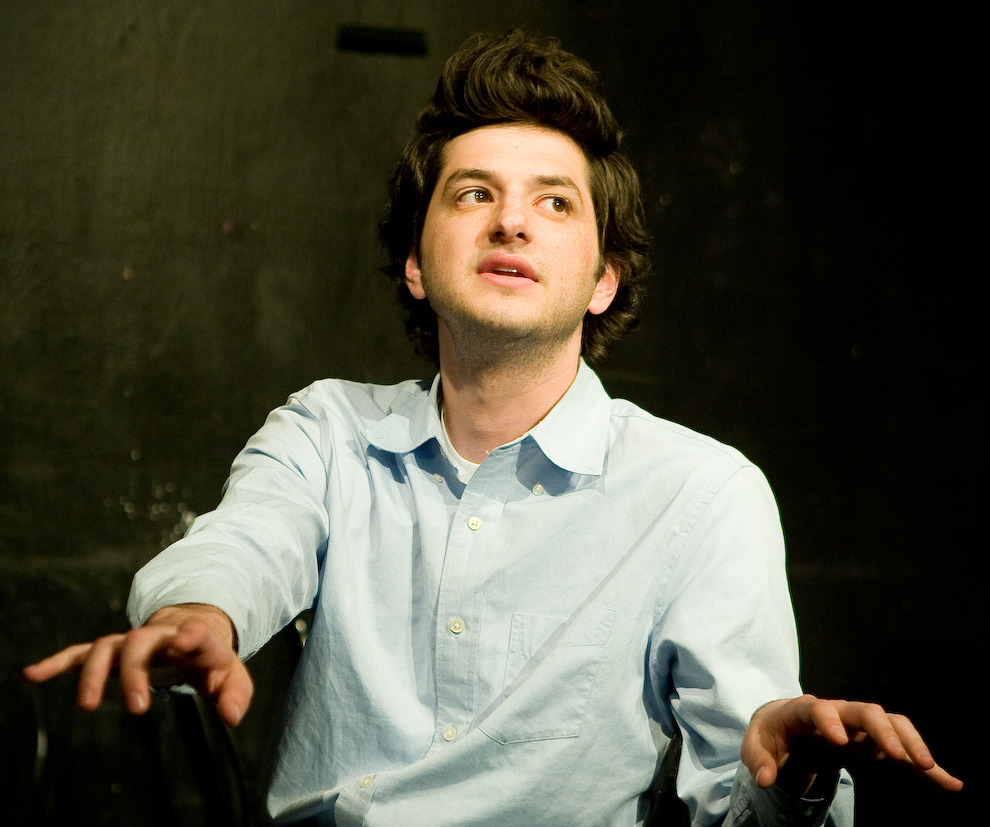
Ben Schwartz continued to appear in the third season as Tom Haverford's cocky friend Jean-Ralphio Saperstein.

Several actors who had appeared in previous seasons of Parks and Recreation continue to appear in the third season, including Ben Schwartz as Tom's cocky and entrepreneurial friend Jean-Ralphio Saperstein; Natalie Morales as bartender and Tom's girlfriend Lucy; Jama Williamson as Wendy, Tom's ex-wife who starts dating Ron; Pamela Reed as Leslie's mother Marlene Griggs-Knope; Alison Becker as newspaper reporter Shauna Malwae-Tweep; Darlene Hunt as conservative activist Marcia Langman; Mo Collins as morning talk show host Joan Callamezzo; Jay Jackson as television newscaster Perd Hapley; Andy Forrest as Andy's frequent shoeshine customer Kyle, and Kirk Fox as sleazy sewage department employee Joe. Eric Pierpoint appeared in "Ron & Tammy: Part Two" and "Eagleton" as Hugh Trumple, chief of the Pawnee police department. Comedians Matt Besser and Nick Kroll appeared in "Media Blitz" as "Crazy Ira and The Douche", the hosts of a Pawnee morning zoo-style radio show. Besser had previously been on the sketch comedy show and troupe Upright Citizens Brigade with Poehler. Detlef Schrempf, a retired Indiana Pacers basketball player who played himself in the second-season episode "Telethon", appeared again in "Li'l Sebastian". Jonathan Joss, who previously voiced John Redcorn in the animated television series King of the Hill — which was co-created by Parks and Recreation co-creator Greg Daniels — guest starred in "Harvest Festival" as the local Native American tribe leader.

=== Filming ===
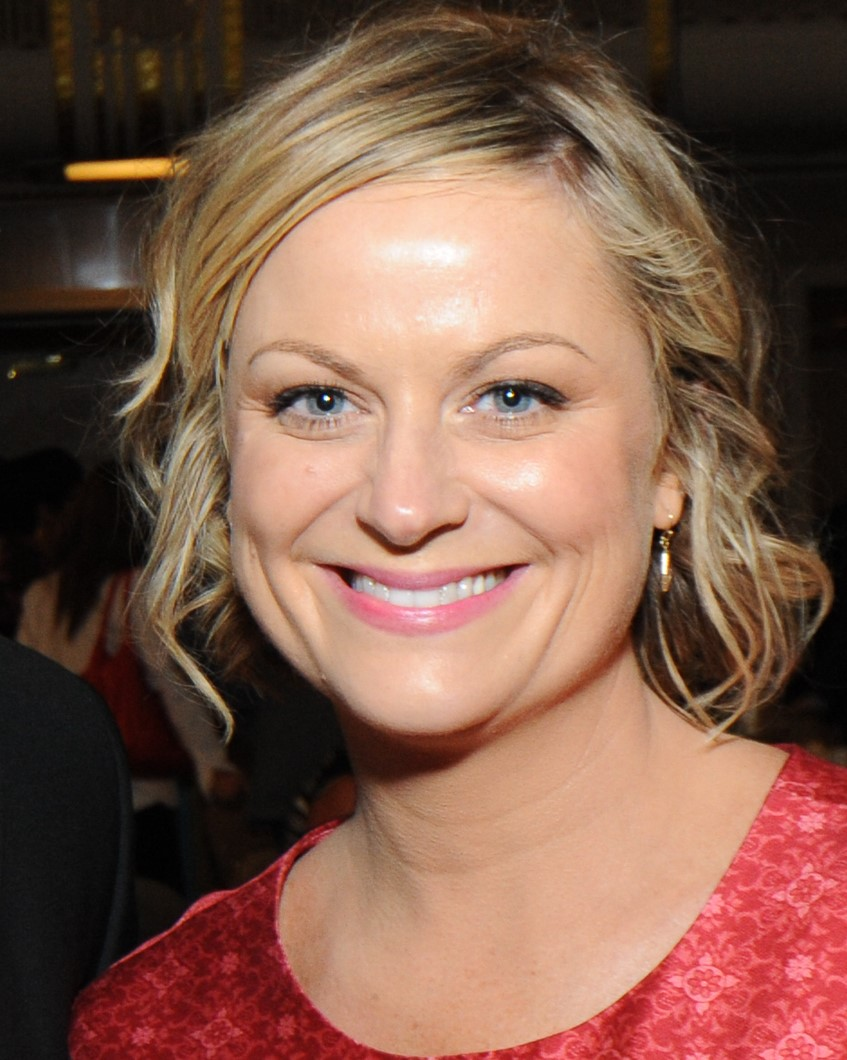
The first six episodes of the third season were filmed early to accommodate the pregnancy of Amy Poehler (pictured).

Toward the end of production on the second season, lead actor Amy Poehler became pregnant and the producers of the show were forced to go into production on season three early and film an additional six episodes to accommodate not only Poehler's pregnancy, but also a projected September 2010 air date. Amy Poehler said the cast was "a little fried" by the intense shooting schedule, but that the addition of Adam Scott and Rob Lowe to the cast provided an energy boost. Since Poehler was six months pregnant at the time of filming the first six episodes, she was often strategically placed behind items to conceal her belly. Although the third episode to be shown, "Time Capsule" was the last of these six episodes to be filmed because the story presented the highest amount of props to place Poehler in front of objects to hide her pregnancy, most notably the time capsule itself.

However, NBC eventually opted not to put the show on the fall schedule, and instead delayed the premiere of the third season until the beginning of 2011. This allowed for the network to run its new comedy, Outsourced, in two-hour comedy schedule block rather than Parks and Recreation. The schedule change meant that all sixteen episodes from the third season would be filmed before any of them were shown; the rest of the episodes, starting with the seventh, were filmed in the fall of 2010. NBC chief executive officer Jeff Gaspin said this move was not a reflection on Parks and Recreation, and suggested the extended hiatus would not only have no negative effect on the show, but could actually build anticipation for its return. Series co-creator Michael Schur said the schedule changes were frustrating, but said: "It sounds a little corny, maybe even a little community theater-ish, but when we got the bad news our thinking was to just put our heads down and keep making the best show we could." Amy Poehler said of the hiatus, "It was an NBC decision and certainly we were confused. But I think, weirdly, there's a momentum that comes from people waiting for us, which is nice." Poehler also said it gave them the luxury of time to go back and reedit episodes or shoot and add new material.

As in previous seasons, filming of the third season of the series included a large amount of improvisation from the cast. For example, during one scene in "The Fight" in which almost the entire cast becomes intoxicated at the Snakehole Lounge bar, each actor spent about two days on their own filming their own individual scenes. Much of the filming was improvised, including shots used in a montage sequence that showed how drunk each character had become by the end of the night. Amy Poehler described the filming as "the most fun I've ever had". Nick Offerman and Megan Mullally also improvised a great deal of their scenes during the filming of "Ron & Tammy: Part Two". The third season continued to use several visual and camera techniques that had been introduced in past seasons. In the past, Poehler would improvise several different jokes during a take, and they would be intermingled into a montage of jump cuts featuring many of the jokes. That technique was used prominently in "Indianapolis" during a scene in which Leslie comforts Ann with stories about multiple times Leslie was dumped in the past. The same technique was used by Aziz Ansari in "Soulmates", during a scene in which Tom describes many slang nicknames he has given to foods, and in "The Fight", in which Tom describes many strange entrepreneurial idea he has come up with.

The "Harvest Festival" episode featured an elaborate festival setting and corn maze sets. Due to budget restraints, the Parks and Recreation set department did not build the set, but instead used a real-life setting at Los Angeles Pierce College, a community college in California which holds an annual festival event. Michael Schur said the aerial shot of the harvest festival at the end of the episode was the most expensive shot in the entire series. The episode was filmed out of sequence from the rest of the season so the weather would be cooler when the scenes were shot; Schur jokingly said if this was not done, "the week that we would have been shooting it was like 148 degrees here and the actors would be dead now". The Eagleton public forum scene in the episode "Eagleton" was shot at the Toluca Lake Sports Center in the Toluca Lake district of Los Angeles. The season finale "Li'l Sebastian" saw the introduction of the headquarters for Tom and Jean-Ralphio's new company, Entertainment 720. The setting was a completely white 15,000-square-foot (1,400 m^{2}) room with modern decor and unusual furniture, and Michael Schur described the setting as, "Maybe the craziest thing that's ever been on our series ... It's truly nuts. It's like a hallucinogenic nightmare."

After the original broadcast of "Ron & Tammy: Part Two", NBC ran a commercial advertising "April and Andy's wedding registry" on the official Parks and Recreation website. At this point in the season, April and Andy were separated and had not yet reconciled. Shortly after the episode aired, HitFix television reviewer Alan Sepinwall wrote that the commercial mistakenly used the wrong names and was actually referring to Ron and Tammy's wedding registry. However, after "Andy and April's Fancy Party" aired, Schur admitted the commercial was intended to run with that episode, but ran with "Ron & Tammy: Part Two" due to an error by NBC employees: Schur said afterward, "We sincerely hope that fans of the show are cool with us gently lying to them, in an effort to maintain the surprise nuptials as much as we could."

=== Writing ===
The financial difficulties Pawnee experiences during the third season were reflective of the Great Recession facing the nation and much of the world when the episodes were produced. The idea of state auditors visiting Pawnee, and the subsequent government shutdown, were inspired by news reports at the time of a number of states that were considering a shut down of schools, parks and other services due to the global recession. Amy Poehler described one of the early themes of the season as Leslie Knope trying to maintain her optimism about public service in the face of economic cutbacks and cynicism about government: "How does one person work in government and not become cynical? How does someone believe that change could happen without losing faith?"

Much of the first seven episodes of the season revolved around the characters organizing a harvest festival, which had previously been a Pawnee tradition before it ended. The storyline stemmed from serious budget problems facing Pawnee and the major cuts threatened to the parks department, which prompts Leslie to bring the harvest festival back and stake the future of the entire department on its success and failure. The festival served as a device to bring all the characters together working toward a common goal, similar to efforts to turn a construction pit into a park during the first two seasons. Schur said the harvest festival story arc was written in part because the first six episodes were written and filmed early, so the writing staff felt having one concise storyline to tie them together kept the show focused. Schur also said the writers were fatigued from working on six third-season episodes immediately after the second season, so the harvest festival story arc helped "organize our tired, end-of-the-year brains".

One of the biggest story arcs of the third season was the romance between Leslie and Ben, which slowly developed throughout the series until they officially began dating in the episode "Road Trip" despite a strict policy against workplace dating at city hall. The development of Ben's feelings for Leslie coincide with his growing appreciation for Pawnee; the character never had a firm sense of home due to the excessive amount of traveling with his job, but throughout the season Ben gradually falls in love with the town due to the optimism and enthusiasm Leslie Knope shows for Pawnee and her job. The no-dating policy, imposed by Chris, stemmed from real life policies in small town governments, which Schur said were considered very important because "these people are handling taxpayer money, so relationships are even more frowned upon than they are in the private sector". During the season finale "Li'l Sebastian", Leslie is encouraged by political operatives to run for office, but is asked whether there any potential scandals that could risk becoming public. Leslie denies there are any, but it is suggested her secret relationship with Ben could become such a scandal.

The first five episodes of the season involve Andy and his attempt to win back the affections of April, who previously had feelings for Andy, but became angry after Ann kissed him in the second-season finale, "Freddy Spaghetti". The two reconcile in "Media Blitz", which Schur described as a "key moment" in their relationship, "almost like Andy's a Knight of the Round Table, and he's got a lot of different obstacles that he's got to overcome in order to win the love of a fair maiden". Andy and April become married during a surprise wedding four episodes later in "Andy and April's Fancy Party". Schur said the decision to have them marry after only briefly dating stemmed from the writing staff's desire to "avoid the standard-issue TV romance plots: fights, other men/women driving them apart, and so on". They decided a fast marriage was funny, but also made sense because the characters are "two impulsive goofballs who don’t approach their lives in a responsible, adult manner".

I am a big believer that people should be in a very different place at the end of every season than they were at the beginning of the season. So that was our only goal; we just sort of tried to follow through on the characters, and what the characters' lives had presented them, over the course of the year. I just wanted it to feel like everybody made a move. So we had everybody make a move.

— Michael Schur, Parks and Recreation co-creator

Michael Schur said another goal of the third season was to better demonstrate the comedic abilities of Rashida Jones, whose Ann Perkins character had often been portrayed as a straight man role to the other characters. This was done by placing Jones in a romantic relationship with Rob Lowe's character Chris Traeger, who is so overly-optimistic and seemingly-perfect that Ann has trouble finding any flaws and is taken aback by him. Schur said: "Rashida is a very intelligent and attractive woman, and it's hard to knock someone like that off balance. And the way to knock that person off balance is to get Rob Lowe in a relationship with you." Ann is further taken out of her element when it is revealed in "Indianapolis" that Chris broke up with her, but did so in such a positive and upbeat way that Ann did not realize it for several days. Afterward, Ann continues to move away her previous straight man role by going on a string of dates with many random men. During the final episodes of the season, Ann takes a part-time job at city hall as the health department public relations director, which Schur described as "the natural full circle from the beginning of the season". This marked her process of getting over Chris and becoming a "more mature person". Schur also said having Ann work at city hall would make it easier to integrate her into storylines with the other characters.

The character Tom Haverford also undergoes changes during the final episodes of the season, in which the character begins to consider leaving his city hall position to pursue his own business ambitions. The storyline is advanced particularly strongly in "The Bubble", when Tom becomes frustrated with an assignment by Chris, and culminates in the season finale "Li'l Sebastian", in which he ultimately quits the parks department to form an entertainment company. "Li'l Sebastian" ends with several cliffhanger twists including Tom's departure from city hall, Leslie being approached to run for office, and the arrival of Ron's first ex-wife Tammy, although the actress who will play her was not revealed. Schur said the writing staff had a general idea of where the newly introduced storylines should go, but the exact stories had not been completely worked out yet when the episodes broadcast. Schur said they sought to "write the juiciest, most exciting cliffhanger-y possible scenario you can write, and then you have all summer to figure out how to get yourself out of it".

== Reception ==
=== Broadcast ===
While Parks and Recreation previously aired on 8:30 p.m. EST on Thursdays, the third season marked its debut in a 9:30 p.m. Thursday timeslot effective January 20, 2011, airing between the two popular series The Office and 30 Rock. Poehler said of the time-slot, "'The Office' is such an amazing show and to be behind it is an honor." The Parks producers hoped the Office lead-in would bring new viewers, and so the season premiere "Go Big or Go Home" included an introductory sequence that described the previous events of the series. In some cases, "Producer's Cut" versions of third-season episodes were made available on the official NBC website after they were broadcast. These cuts were about five minutes longer than the televised version and included several scenes that were originally cut due to length limitations. The episodes to receive "Producer's Cuts" included "Harvest Festival", "The Fight" and "Li'l Sebastian".

During its original broadcast, the episode "Jerry's Painting" ran for an extended 40 minutes rather than the usual 30 minutes because it followed "Goodbye, Michael", an extended episode of The Office that featured the final appearance of Steve Carell as a regular cast member. "The Fight" and "Road Trip" ran back-to-back during their original broadcast on May 12, 2011, as did "The Bubble" and "Li'l Sebastian" on May 19. The four were stand-alone episodes that were not originally designed to be shown together, However, because the third season premiered late as a mid-season replacement in January, the episodes aired together so the series' season would conclude at the end of the television season.

=== Reviews ===
Parks and Recreation continued to receive critical acclaim, as it did during the second season. The show was featured on the February 11 cover of Entertainment Weekly, where it was called "the smartest comedy on TV" and which included the article "The 101 Reasons We Love Parks and Recreation". James Poniewozik of Time magazine called it "a fabulous season – the best thing on TV in 2011 so far". Maureen Ryan of TV Squad called it one of the ten best shows of 2011, and said the season saw major growth of both its major characters, especially Leslie Knope, along with the expansion of a strong cast of secondary and tertiary characters as well. New York magazine writer Willa Paskin praised the show for comedy grounded in optimism and characters who genuinely like each other, rather than the cynical humor more prevalent in other comedy shows of the time. Alan Sepinwall of HitFix called it a "remarkable season of TV comedy" without a single bad episode. Steve Heisler of The A.V. Club said although he considered Parks and Recreation the funniest sitcom on television during its second season, "it somehow got even better" during the third. Scott Meslow of The Atlantic said during the third season, Parks and Recreation was "the funniest, sweetest, most consistent sitcom on television", and that the way the characters were seeking new opportunities outside the parks department by the end of the season demonstrates the show is willing to change and is "not content to simply spin its wheels". Eric Sundermann of Hollywood.com said he believed that the third season "will become to be recognized as one of the best seasons of any sitcom ever", and that the characters and setting of Pawnee were so fully developed that he felt a close, personal connection to them. Henry Hanks of CNN called it "a near-flawless season".

"Harvest Festival" received particularly strong reviews, with New York magazine writer Steve Kandell calling it the most pivotal episode of the season in terms of "resolving and resetting narrative stakes". Likewise, "Li'l Sebastian" was praised by several reviewers as one of the best episodes of the season, and Henry Hanks called it "one of the funniest half-hours of any show this season". As in past seasons, Nick Offerman continued to receive critical acclaim for his performance as Ron Swanson. By the third season, the character had taken on a cult status, and the term "Ron Swanson" was so commonly discussed on the social-networking website Twitter after "Andy and April's Fancy Party" aired that it was listed among the site's trending topics, which are indicative of being the most popular topics being discussed on Twitter at a given moment. Rob Lowe received particularly strong reviews for his performance in "Flu Season" where his normally extraordinarily-physically fit character becomes extremely ill and hallucinatory when infected with the flu. Aziz Ansari received very positive reviews for his performance in "Soulmates", as did Adam Scott for his performance in "Media Blitz". While some commentators felt the Ann Perkins character seemed adrift and not working as well as the other cast members, others said they liked the new direction the character had taken this season. Eric Sundermann declared the relationship between Chris and Ann was described as "one of the most interesting parts of the show", whereas Joel Keller of TV Squad felt it was poorly handled and made Ann too passive. Some reviewers said the town of Pawnee itself has developed into a rich and interesting setting, comparing it to Springfield in the Fox animated series The Simpsons.

=== Ratings ===
Despite the critical success, the third season of Parks and Recreation continued to suffer in the Nielsen ratings, just as it had during the second season. The average viewership for the 16 episodes of season three were 4.75 million household viewers, a slight increase over season two's 4.68 million average, but lower than season one's average of 5.45 million households. Michael Schur partially attributed the continually low viewership to a decline in ratings for NBC in general, as well as changing viewer trends due to a large amount of available channels. He added: "I would love it if our ratings went up and up, and we've done a pretty good job of making our show inviting and friendly, welcoming to new viewers. Other than that, I'm not sure what else we can do. It’s very disconcerting."

Parks and Recreation saw a slight increase in viewership during its first episodes. The season debut, "Go Big or Go Home", was seen by an estimated 6.19 million household viewers, according to Nielsen Media Research, with a 3.2 rating/8 share among viewers between ages 18 and 49. It marked the series' highest rating in that demographic, and the highest overall viewership since the series premiere episode from April 2009, which was seen by 6.77 million household viewers. The ratings quickly dropped, however, and by the third episode "Time Capsule" had dipped to 4.95 million household viewers, a more than 17 percent decline from the previous episode, "Flu Season". By the seventh episode, "Harvest Festival", viewership had dropped to 4.08 million households, one of the lowest ratings of the series.

The ratings increased slightly after that point, with the viewership for the next episode "Camping" jumping up 39 percent to 5.15 million households. Ratings for the eleventh episode, "Jerry's Painting", were expected to be high due to a lead-in from Steve Carell's final episode as a regular cast member on The Office. However, the Parks and Recreation episode was seen by an estimated 4.71 million household viewers, a drop from the previous episode "Soulmates". Ratings were unusually low for Parks and Recreation during its last four episodes due to the timeslot changes and back-to-back pairing of the episodes: "The Fight" and "Road Trip" were seen by 4.55 million and 3.54 million households, respectively, while "The Bubble" and season finale "Li'l Sebastian" were seen by 4.27 and 3.72 million households, respectively.

=== Awards ===
In 2011, Parks and Recreation was nominated for a Primetime Emmy Award for Outstanding Comedy Series, the first such nomination for the series. Amy Poehler received her second Primetime Emmy Award nomination for Outstanding Lead Actress in a Comedy Series. Poehler said she was considering submitting the episodes "Flu Season" or "The Fight" for Emmy Award consideration. In June 2011, Parks and Recreation was nominated for three of the inaugural Critics’ Choice Television Awards. The show itself was nominated for "Best Comedy Series", Amy Poehler was nominated for "Best Actress in a Comedy Series" and Nick Offerman was nominated for "Best Supporting Actor in a Comedy Series". Also that month, Parks and Recreation was nominated for four TCA Awards: Program of the Year, Outstanding Achievement in Comedy and Individual Achievement in Comedy awards for Offerman and Poehler. Offerman also hosted the TCA Awards in 2011.
