= Ron & Tammy: Part Two =

- Parks and Recreation episode
- Episode no.: Season 3 Episode 4
- Directed by: Tucker Gates
- Written by: Emily Kapnek
- Original air date: February 10, 2011

Guest appearances
- Brooke Baumer as Marci; Tracy Howe as Police Officer #1; Matt Kelley as Waiter; Will McLaughlin as Police Officer #2; Megan Mullally as Tammy Swanson; Craig Pearman as Justice of the Peace; Eric Pierpoint as Chief Hugh Trumple; Marc Raducci as Police Officer #4; Kurt Scholler as Police Officer #3; James Sharpe as Jack; Jama Williamson as Wendy Haverford

Episode chronology
← Previous "Time Capsule"	Next → "Media Blitz"
- Parks and Recreation season 3

"Ron & Tammy: Part Two" (sometimes referred to as "Ron and Tammy II") is the fourth episode of the third season of the American comedy television series Parks and Recreation, and the 34th overall episode of the series. It originally aired on NBC in the United States on February 10, 2011. In the episode, Tom tries to make Ron jealous by dating Ron's ex-wife Tammy, causing the two to resume their unhealthy and destructive relationship. Meanwhile, Leslie and Ben ask the police to provide security for the harvest festival, and April is assigned to be Chris's secretary.

Written by Emily Kapnek and directed by Tucker Gates, the episode is considered a sequel to the second season episode "Ron and Tammy". Megan Mullally, the real-life wife of actor Nick Offerman, reprises her role as Tammy. Mullally and Offerman were permitted a great deal of improvisation during their scenes, the both of them admitting in the audio commentary that their graphically intimate scenes together actually made other cast members uncomfortable. "Ron & Tammy: Part Two" also features guest appearances by Eric Pierpoint as Pawnee Police Chief Trumple and Jama Williamson in the last of several guest performances as Tom's ex-wife, Wendy.

When the episode first broadcast, NBC ran a commercial advertising "April and Andy's wedding registry" on the official Parks and Recreation website. Although apparently a mistake intended to refer to Ron and Tammy's registry, some commentators suggested it could be indicative of future events in the series. According to Nielsen Media Research, "Ron & Tammy: Part Two" was seen by 5.03 million household viewers, a slight increase from the previous episode, "Time Capsule". It received critical acclaim, with several commentators praising the re-pairing of Ron and Tammy, as well as Nick Offerman's performance.

== Plot ==
Ron's ex-wife Tammy continues her efforts to sabotage his life, but the normally susceptible Ron easily resists her seductions because he is now in a solid relationship with Tom's ex-wife Wendy, much to Tom's jealousy. Later, however, Wendy tells Ron that she plans to move back to Canada to look after her aging parents; since Ron is unwilling to go with her, they break up. Meanwhile, Leslie and the parks department throw a party for the Pawnee police department, where they hope to ask them to provide security for the upcoming Harvest Festival. During the party, Ben awkwardly fails to get Chief Trumple's favor. Tom, unaware of Ron and Wendy's breakup, arrives at the party with Tammy to make him jealous. After bickering loudly, Ron and Tammy both decide to leave the party together to talk and try to make amends. However, a night filled with drunken sex and mayhem ensues, ending with the two getting remarried and ending up in jail.

After getting Ron released, the parks department holds an intervention for him about Tammy, even playing a previously recorded tape of Ron warning himself to stay away from her. Ron ignores the warnings and prepares to take Tammy to his cabin for a sex-filled honeymoon after her bridal shower. Leslie blames Tom for the dilemma and, although he initially claims to be unfazed, Tom later arrives at the bridal shower to stop Ron from going on the honeymoon. Tom reveals that Tammy only agreed to be his date at the party to make Ron miserable. Tammy mercilessly attacks Tom, prompting Ron to remember what a monster she truly is. Ron picks Tom up and carries him away, and the two later make amends. Despite the bad impression he made the day before, Ben asks Trumple for the Harvest Festival favor. The chief unconditionally agrees out of respect for Leslie, who he said always helps everyone, and because Leslie once dated his friend Dave. Ben seems relieved Leslie and Dave are no longer together, and he later asks Leslie out to eat.

In the B story, April is working as Chris' assistant until he goes back to Indianapolis. April's cynical personality clashes with Chris' relentless optimism and happiness. In an attempt to get fired, April purposely neglects to tell Ann that Chris cannot make a lunch date. When Ann arrives to confront Chris, she quickly realizes April's ploy. Ann reveals she is very happy dating Chris, and would even probably move with him to Indianapolis if asked. Andy, who is still trying to win back April's affections, gives Chris an obviously forged letter from the FBI claiming April must immediately return to the parks department. Chris sees through the ruse and tells April she can go back, but that remaining his assistant may provide her career opportunities. He invites her to go to Indianapolis with him and she seems interested, leaving Andy stunned and Ann jealous.

== Production ==
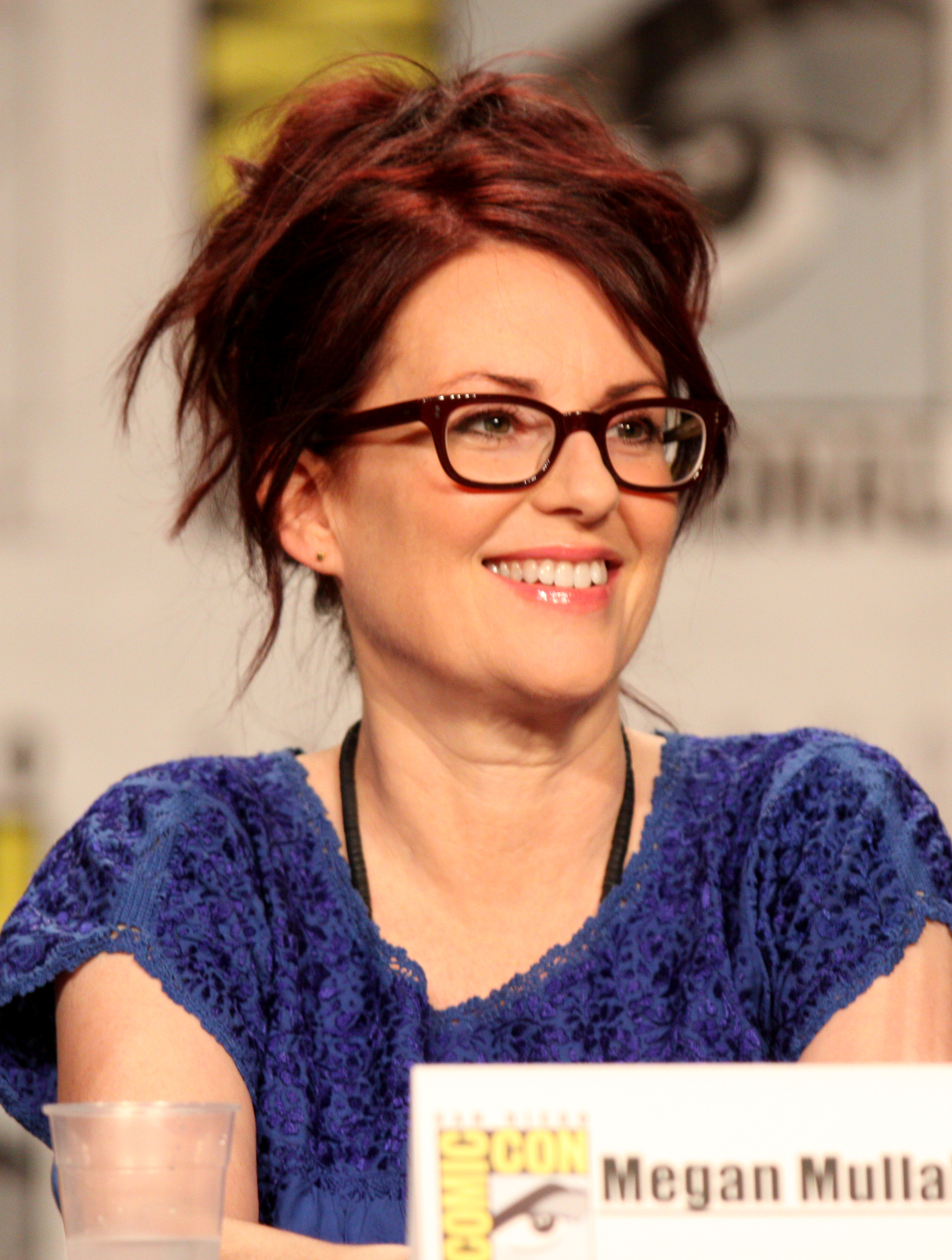
Megan Mullally reprises the role of Tammy, ex-wife of Mullally's real-life husband Nick Offerman's character Ron, in this episode.

"Ron & Tammy: Part Two", sometimes informally referred to as "Ron and Tammy II", was written by Parks consulting producer Emily Kapnek and directed by Tucker Gates, who has previously directed episodes of The Office, another comedy series created by Parks co-creator Greg Daniels. Like all of the first six third season episodes, it was written and filmed almost immediately after the second season ended as part of an early shooting schedule needed to accommodate Amy Poehler's pregnancy. However, although finished early in anticipation of a September 2010 release date, Parks was ultimately placed on hiatus until early 2011, many months after production on "Ron & Tammy: Part Two" was finished. The episode is considered a sequel to the second season episode "Ron and Tammy", which introduced the character of Ron Swanson's ex-wife, Tammy, and their unhealthy relationship with each other. Megan Mullally, the real-life wife of actor Nick Offerman, reprises her role as Tammy. "Ron and Tammy" was one of the most well-received episodes of the second season, so the writers immediately started contemplating ways to bring the character back.

Offerman said he worked well with Mullally, and that the two both enjoy "pushing the envelope and testing our boundaries, both of physical ability and good taste". He jokingly said of filming the episode:

"They tell me it's quite something. I honestly don't remember much of what took place during the filming of that episode because it was like a crazy peyote fever dream. I remember there was lots of howling, and I came away very sore and scarred. Parts of my anatomy were alarmingly chafed. They say it turned out well. I'm excited to see it."

Offerman and Mullally were allowed to improvise a great deal during filming. The episode features a montage of various clips showing how Ron and Tammy gradually go from fighting with each other to getting married over the course of a particularly wild night. Long sequences of footage were shot — including Ron and Tammy loudly arguing on the sidewalk and the two making out atop a police car — but little more than a few seconds ultimately made the final episode. Offerman said it took about a half hour for the hair department to give him his cornrows haircut. He said he enjoyed the process, saying it "felt like a stiff head massage".

Mullally said Tammy is expected to appear again in future episodes: "It seems like it's sort of a once a season-ish kind of event. When Tammy shows up, it pretty much brings Ron to a screeching halt." Mullally and Parks co-star Adam Scott also starred together in the Starz comedy series Party Down. "Ron & Tammy: Part Two" featured the last of several guest performances of Jama Williamson as Wendy, who revealed she was returning to her home country of Canada to care for her aging parents. Pawnee Police Chief Trumple was portrayed by Eric Pierpoint, who has played several police officers throughout his career, including an alien police officer in the science fiction series Alien Nation and a police chief in the superhero drama series The Cape.

Immediately after "Ron & Tammy: Part Two" first aired on February 10, 2011, NBC ran a commercial advertising "April and Andy's wedding registry" on the official Parks and Recreation website. This seemed inconsistent with the show's storyline because, although April and Andy had previously expressed romantic interest in each other, the two had separated and were not yet reconciled at the time of the episode. Shortly after the episode aired, HitFix television reviewer Alan Sepinwall wrote that the commercial mistakenly used the wrong names and was actually referring to Ron and Tammy's wedding registry, which was mentioned in "Ron & Tammy: Part Two" and was indeed featured on the Parks and Recreation website. However, while images of both April and Andy were featured in the commercial, Tammy herself was not, and some commentators suggested the error could be indicative of future events in the series. Andy and April eventually did marry in the episode "Andy and April's Fancy Party". Afterward, Parks co-creator Michael Schur admitted the commercial was intended to run with that episode, but ran with "Ron & Tammy: Part Two" due to an error by NBC employees:

"In an effort to undo the spoiler, we publicly stated, in a number of interviews, that NBC had just accidentally gotten the character names wrong, and that there was no upcoming Andy-April wedding. We sincerely hope that fans of the show are cool with us gently lying to them, in an effort to maintain the surprise nuptials as much as we could. Now if you'll excuse us, we have to go shoot the season finale surprise Jerry-Donna wedding scene."

== Reception ==
=== Ratings ===
In its original American broadcast, "Ron & Tammy: Part Two" was seen by an estimated 5.03 million household viewers, according to Nielsen Media Research, with an overall 3.0 rating/5 share, and a 2.5 rating/7 share among viewers between ages 18 and 49. It marked a slight increase in viewership compared to the previous episode, "Time Capsule". The night "Ron & Tammy: Part Two" was broadcast, Parks and Recreation was outperformed in its timeslot by the CBS crime drama series CSI: Crime Scene Investigation, which was seen by 12.78 million households; the ABC medical drama series Grey's Anatomy, which was seen by 10.4 million household viewers; and the Fox comedy-drama series Bones, which was seen by 9.5 million households.

=== Reviews ===
"Ron & Tammy: Part Two" received highly positive reviews, with several commentators praising the repairing of Ron and Tammy, Nick Offerman's performance and, in particular, the line in which Ron explains how part of his mustache became shaved off: "It rubbed off... from friction." Entertainment Weekly writer Hillary Busis said she feared Megan Mullally could not live up to her performance in "Ron and Tammy", but she said the follow-up episode "gave Parks and Rec fans everything they could hope for and more". Busis also praised the pairing of the enthusiastic Chris and the apathetic April. Alan Sepinwall of HitFix enjoyed that the script did not simply rehash the original "Ron and Tammy" story, but instead played it well off the Tom, Wendy and Ron love triangle. Sepinwall also praised the Chris/April pairing and the fact that Adam Scott got to do more than play his usual straight man role. He added that he hoped each season would have a Ron and Tammy-centric episode, but limit it to once a year in the style of Cheers Bar Wars episodes.

The A.V. Club writer Steve Heisler said the episode was "just about as good as it gets", with several great moments revolving around Nick Offerman's deadpan comedic delivery. Heisler also said making the police department part of the script was a good way to better flesh out Pawnee and its townspeople. New York magazine writer Steve Kandell praised the performances of Offerman and Aubrey Plaza, and referred to Tammy as Pawnee's equivalent of Sideshow Bob in The Simpsons' Springfield. Kandell also liked that the episode "had heart" because the Tammy subplot was resolved by Ron standing up for Tom. TV Squad writer Joel Keller said the episode did not reach the level of the original "Ron and Tammy", but that "it still had more than enough funny, cringeworthy and downright gross moments to be very satisfying". He declared Mullally "one of the best sitcom creations this side of Colonel Flagg on M*A*S*H". The Atlantic writer Scott Meslow praised Ron Swanson as the show's "breakout character", and said "Ron & Tammy: Part Two" was so good that he hoped for another sequel episode in the next season.

Rick Porter of Zap2it said the episode featured several great scenes between Ron and Tammy and called it a "tour de force" for Nick Offerman, but also appreciated that the episode featured strong moments outside that main plotline. He called it the best comedic showcase for Adam Scott so far in the season, and praised both the pairing of April and Chris, and the way that subplot led to Ann's confusion about her future with Chris. Eric Sundermann of Hollywood.com said the subplot with April and Chris demonstrated how Parks often succeeds in pairing two characters that often seem to have little connection to each other. Sundermann also enjoyed how Ben's awkwardness around the police chief illustrated how "the show is becoming more and more clear on who understands and fits in Pawnee, versus who doesn't". TV Fanatic writer Matt Richenthal said the dynamic between Ron and Tammy worked well not only due to their real-life relationship, but also because of the balance between "the couple's over-the-top antics and the heart it showed in other areas". Richenthal also complimented the performance of Chris Pratt as the "sweet, well-intentioned, air-headed Andy".
