= Time Capsule (Parks and Recreation) =

- Parks and Recreation episode
- Episode no.: Season 3 Episode 3
- Directed by: Michael Schur
- Written by: Michael Schur
- Original air date: February 3, 2011

Guest appearances
- Alison Becker as Shauna Malwae-Tweep; Tom Beyer as Stan; Will Forte as Kelly Larson; Erin Gibson as Anna; Steve Guilmette as Chip; Kelly Hawthorne as Jill; Jim Hoffmaster as Carl; Darlene Hunt as Marcia Langman; Jeffrey Markle as Man; Carlo Mendez as Eduardo; Natalie Morales as Lucy; Karen Teilha as Beverly; Richard Voigts as Bob; Jama Williamson as Wendy Haverford

Episode chronology
| ← Previous "Flu Season" | Next → "Ron & Tammy: Part Two" |
- Parks and Recreation season 3

"Time Capsule" is the third episode of the third season of the American comedy television series Parks and Recreation, and the 33rd overall episode of the series. It originally aired on NBC in the United States on February 3, 2011. In the episode, Leslie tries to encourage civic pride through a time capsule, but it descends into chaos as Pawnee citizens argue over what to include. Meanwhile, Chris tries to help Andy win back April.

Written and directed by series co-creator and executive producer Michael Schur, "Time Capsule" was one of six episodes filmed early after second season to accommodate Amy Poehler's pregnancy. Although always meant as the third episode of the season, it was the last of the six filmed because it had the highest amount of props that could conceal Poehler's belly. Saturday Night Live star Will Forte guest starred as Kelly Larson, a Pawnee citizen who passionately argues for including the Twilight books in the time capsule.

"Time Capsule" also included appearances by recurring guest stars Jama Williamson, Alison Becker, Darlene Hunt and Natalie Morales, who made her last in a string of performances as Tom's girlfriend Lucy. According to Nielsen Media Research, the episode was seen by 4.95 million household viewers, a 17 percent decline from the previous episode, "Flu Season". It received generally positive reviews.

== Plot ==
Leslie is organizing the making of a time capsule, meant to be opened 50 years in the future and filled with items that encapsulate the spirit of Pawnee. A citizen named Kelly Larson comes to Leslie's office and makes a passionate plea for the Twilight books to be included. When Leslie refuses because the books have no connection to Pawnee, Kelly handcuffs himself to a pipe in her office until she reconsiders. He is able to stay several days because he brought food, water and a pillow. During his stay, Kelly notices Tom appears sad, and correctly deduces Tom is having romantic issues; Tom's girlfriend Lucy has dumped him because Tom cannot get over the fact that his ex-wife, Wendy, is dating Ron. Kelly encourages Tom to read Twilight, to which he initially scoffs, but after reading them finds he loves the books. Lucy later visits Tom and tells him she still likes him, and if he ever gets past his Ron & Wendy-jealousy problems he should call her.

After Leslie notices the name "Liz Waverly" in one of Kelly's Twilight books, Kelly admits Liz is his 12-year-old daughter, who introduced him to Twilight. Kelly is divorced from Liz's mother, and wants to put Twilight into the time capsule to impress Liz. Leslie now wants to include it, but Ben says if she makes one exception, everyone will want their own item in the capsule. Leslie decides to hold a public meeting so all citizens can make suggestions for capsule items. The meeting descends into chaos when the participants argue over what to include and make absurd suggestions, such as the ashes of a family member and the ashes of a pet cat. Conservative activist Marcia Langman argues Twilight should not be included because it is too anti-Christian, while a civil liberties organization member says that the book isn't suitable because it is pro-Christian. Leslie tries to compromise by making multiple time capsules, but she ultimately decides to stick to one capsule and include nothing except a video recording of the meeting, which she said represents Pawnee because it shows "a lot of people with a lot of opinions arguing passionately for what they believed in". Ben, a visiting state auditor, says he thinks the residents of Pawnee are strange, but he is impressed by their passion.

In the B story, Andy still pines for April, who remains angry at Andy and is now dating the handsome Eduardo. Chris suggests Andy tap into the aspects of his personality April was attracted to in the first place. However, the only things he can think of are that he is nice and he is in a band. Andy decides to be nice to Eduardo, and the two realize they have similar musical tastes (they both like the Dave Matthews Band) and end up bonding over a guitar session. April becomes frustrated because she only dated Eduardo to make Andy jealous. She dumps Eduardo, which Chris interprets as a sign that his efforts are succeeding. Ann, who was nervous about Andy and Chris spending time together, is relieved when Chris tells her that Andy had nothing but positive things to say about her. The episode ends with the Pawnee residents — including Kelly and his daughter — watching an outdoor screening of the Twilight film.

== Production ==
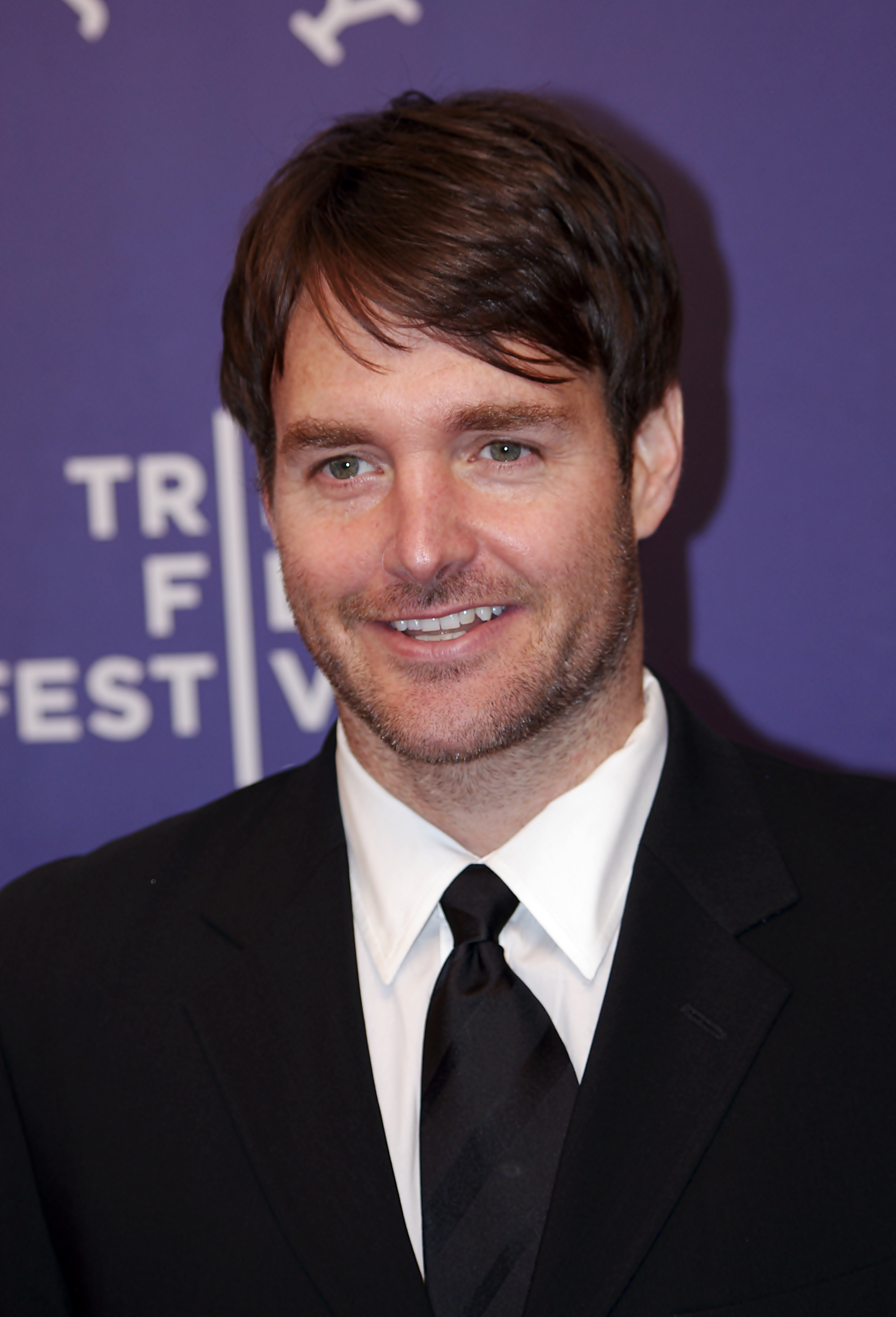
Will Forte guest stars as Kelly Larson, a man who passionately argues for including the Twilight books in the Pawnee time capsule.

"Time Capsule" was written and directed by Parks and Recreation co-creator and executive producer Michael Schur. Like all six of the first third season episodes, it was written and filmed almost immediately after the second season ended as part of an early shooting schedule due to Amy Poehler's pregnancy. However, although finished early in anticipation of a September 2010 release date, Parks was ultimately placed on hiatus until early 2011, many months after production on "Time Capsule" was completed. "Time Capsule" was the last of these six episodes to be filmed, but as planned was shown third in the season. It was filmed last because the story presented the highest amount of props to place Poehler in front of objects that strategically concealed her pregnancy, most notably the time capsule itself.

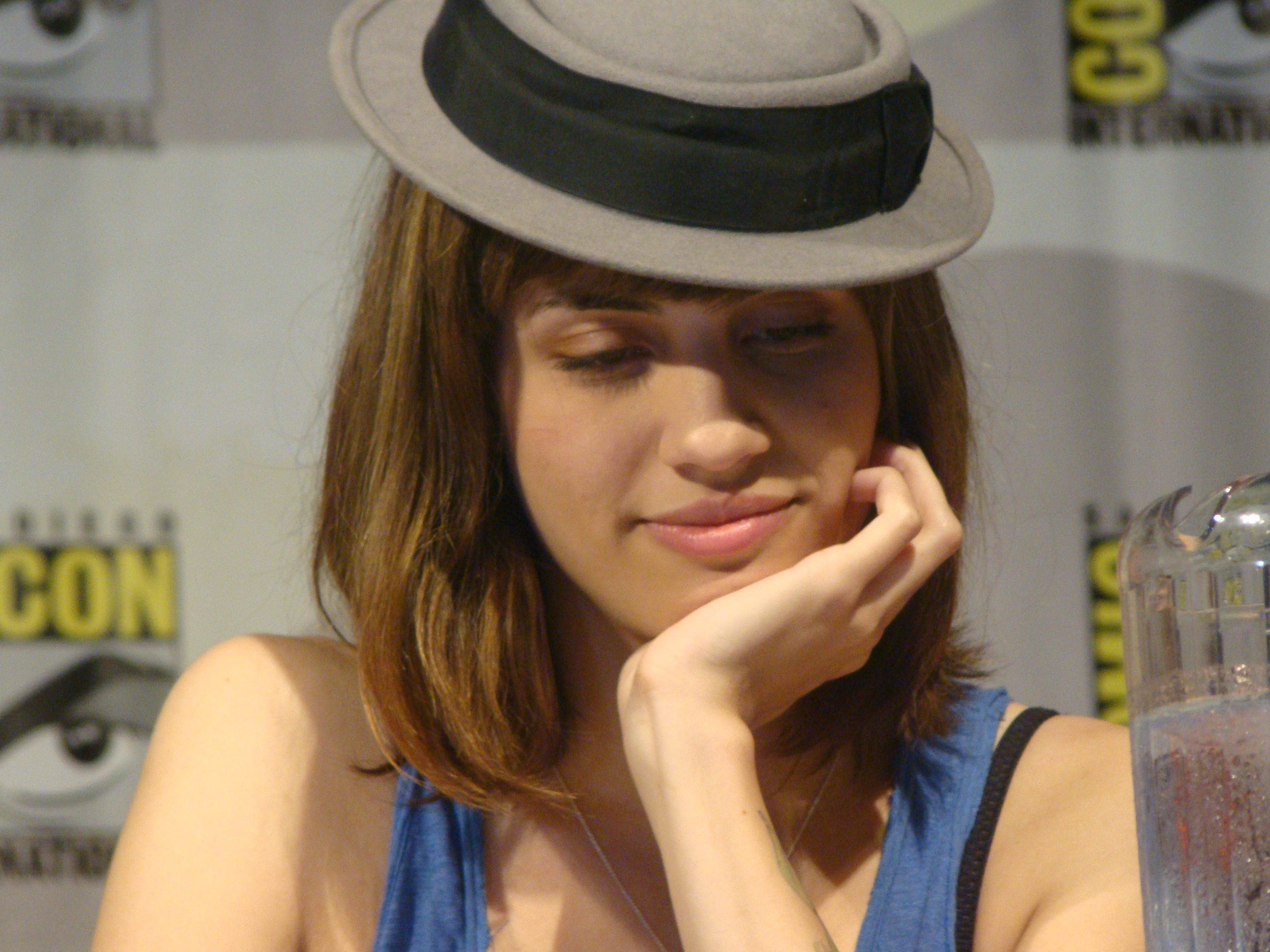
"Time Capsule" marked the last of several performances by Natalie Morales as Lucy, a romantic interest for Tom Haverford.

The episode featured comedian Will Forte in a guest appearance as Kelly Larson, a Pawnee citizen obsessed with Twilight. Forte was a cast member of NBC's sketch comedy show Saturday Night Live, where he previously worked with performer Poehler and writer Schur. "Time Capsule" featured the last in a string of guest performances by Natalie Morales as Lucy, a romantic interest for the Tom Haverford character. Darlene Hunt made a guest appearance as Marcia Langman, a member of the conservative group, the Society for Family Stability Foundation. Hunt previously portrayed Langman in the second-season premiere, "Pawnee Zoo", where she tried to have Leslie fired for holding a same-sex wedding for two male penguins. The episode also featured appearances by Jama Williamson and Alison Becker in their recurring roles as Tom's ex-wife Wendy and reporter Shauna Malwae-Tweep, respectively.

"Time Capsule" continued what Michael Schur described as one of the primary story arcs of the third season: Ben Wyatt gradually falling in love not only with Leslie Knope, but with the town of Pawnee itself. This is particularly illustrated by how impressed Ben is with the Pawnee citizens who make impassioned cases for what they want inside the Pawnee time capsule: although he still considers them weirdos, he respectfully calls them "weirdos who care". During the cold open, while discussing the time capsule, Leslie describes several former Pawnee town slogans. After each slogan, the camera switches to a different cut of Leslie reading another. This method of comedic narrative is frequently used in Parks and Recreation, in which Poehler and the other actors improvise several different jokes and the editors slice them all together into one scene.

== Cultural references ==
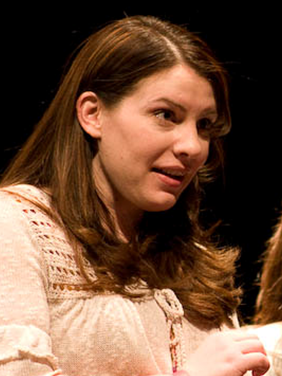
The Twilight series by writer Stephenie Meyer (pictured) made up a major part of the plot in "Time Capsule"

A great deal of the plot in "Time Capsule" revolves around the Twilight series of novels and films. The popular book series was written by Stephenie Meyer. At one point, while trying to persuade Leslie to include Twilight in the capsule, Kelly Larson begins telling the entire story of the Twilight series, including Meyer's birth and life story and shot-for-shot descriptions of the film adaptations. The stories are told from the perspective of high school student and outsider Bella Swan, who is pursued romantically by a vampire named Edward Cullen and a werewolf named Jacob Black. Elements of the story are raised in various scenes of "Time Capsule", including when Tom tries to ask Lucy why she broke up with him: "Is it because I'm not cool enough, like the normal kids compared to the vampires? Is it an Edward-Bella-Jacob type situation, where you like me but there's someone else you like more?" Leslie claims to favor Harry Potter, the popular fantasy series by author J.K. Rowling, over Twilight. Parks department employee Donna professes an unhealthy infatuation with Robert Pattinson, the actor who played Edward Cullen in the Twilight films.

Among the town slogans Leslie described was "Pawnee: The Birthplace of Julia Roberts", a reference to the Academy Award-winning actress. Leslie subsequently explains Roberts is not from Pawnee and that she sued over the slogan, leading to a new slogan: "Pawnee: Home of the World Famous Julia Roberts Lawsuit". During the public meeting, one resident proposes putting Crazy from the Heat, the autobiography of Van Halen lead vocalist David Lee Roth, into the time capsule. When Andy and Eduardo bond, they find they are both fans of Dave Matthews Band, an American jam band. After Lucy breaks up with Tom, he dismissively claims she is crazy, which he claims is what the characters on the HBO comedy-drama series Entourage always say whenever they break up with a woman.

== Reception ==
=== Ratings ===
In its original American broadcast, "Time Capsule" was seen by an estimated 4.95 million household viewers, according to Nielsen Media Research, with an overall 2.9 rating/4 share, and 2.4 rating/6 share among viewers between ages 18 and 49. It marked a more than 17 percent decline compared to the previous episode, "Flu Season", and an even further drop compared to the season premiere "Go Big or Go Home", which was seen by 6.19 million households. The night "Time Capsule" was broadcast, almost all of the comedy shows in NBC's Thursday lineup lost viewership compared to the prior week: while 30 Rock remained flat, Perfect Couples was down 18 percent, Community dropped 9 percent, The Office was down 7 percent and Outsourced dropped 5 percent.

=== Reviews ===
One of the things that Parks and Recreation does so well is portray a small town life without ridiculing small towns. Within Pawnee lies a social strata that's complex and wonderfully goofy; where you're able to laugh at the core characters and the silly townsfolk without attributing their "idiocy" to the actual environment they live in.

— Matt Fowler, IGN

"Time Capsule" received generally positive reviews. Alex Strachan of the Montreal Gazette called it a "near-perfect episode" featuring brisk timing, laugh-out-loud jokes and heartwarming moments of civic unity. Strachan praised Michael Schur's script for being "funny without being hurtful or vicious, heartwarming without being mawkish or sentimental". New York magazine writer Steve Kandell said the fact that Will Forte's character segued believably from a loon to a believable and sympathetic father was a sign of the script's strength. Kandell said, "Could the character have been more over-the-top? Sure. But in the long run, it’s not just funnier, but more dramatic, that he’s not." Hillary Busis of Entertainment Weekly praised "Time Capsule", which she said highlighted how the quirky setting of Pawnee itself contributed a major part to the show's success. Busis said the town's eccentricities were on great display during the public scenes, but did not feel forced or over-the-top. Barry Hertz of the National Post praised both the episode and Forte, whose eccentric performance he said fit in well with the rest of the show. Hertz said, "Every single element on this show is on fire right now, from Andy’s naive stupidity and infatuation with April to Ben’s continued surprise at what Pawnee has to offer."

Matt Fowler of IGN said this episode highlighted how the show excels as portraying small-town life in a comedic way without ridiculing small towns. Fowler said the Twilight jokes felt a bit stale, but he praised Aziz Ansari's performances and moments highlighting the supporting characters, like jokes at the expense of character Jerry Gergich and Ben's developing respect for Pawnee. Zap2it writer Rick Porter said the series, and "Time Capsule" in particular, accurately captures the details and flavors of the local governments and the public in small towns, even if they exaggerate them. Porter praised the pairing of Chris and Andy and said the two conflicting character personalities worked well together. HitFix writer Alan Sepinwall said he did not feel Will Forte's character was well integrated with the rest of the cast and that he dragged down the first half of the episode. However, Sepinwall said once Forte removed himself from Leslie's office, the episode had a "terrific second half", and that the public hearing in particular displayed the strengths of the show. Joel Keller of TV Squad had the opposite view of Alan Sepinwall and felt Forte's character was the most interesting part of the episode, whereas the second half felt "dragged down" and less funny. Keller wrote, "It just lasted a scene too long; we get it, the people in Pawnee are loopy." Eric Sundermann of Hollywood.com said Parks and Recreation is "at its best when its illustrating small-town life in America" and that the public hearing meetings did so brilliantly. Sundermann praised Rob Lowe's performance and said the new additions of the Chris and Ben characters was "exactly what the show needed to push itself to another level of silliness".

The Atlantic writer Scott Meslow said Will Forte's obsession with Twilight led to funny scenes, particularly an impromptu book club meeting with Tom and Donna, but said the character's efforts to impress his daughter didn't make much sense: "Is there a preteen on the planet who would be anything but mortified to find her middle school buzzing with gossip about her father's Twilight-based sit-in?" Steve Hesiler of The A.V. Club said the episode demonstrated how far the show has come because "it was only mid-season two when Parks & Rec started producing episodes where Pawnee residents showed up two, three, or more at a time—and contributed to the larger town mythology." Heisler also praised how the show could pair two seemingly random characters like Andy and Chris and make them so funny. Time magazine writer James Poniewozik called "Time Capsule" the weakest of the first seven third-season episodes, but he said "that speaks more to the high quality of the rest". Poniewozik said the episode demonstrated that, despite how bizarre the complaints of Pawnee residents are, "those concerns and arguments are what makes Pawnee Pawnee". Some reviews were more negative. Matt Richenthal called "Time Capsule" mediocre at best, especially compared to the previous episode, "Flu Season". He said the episode was too centered on the "one-note joke" of Will Forte's character, and that the jokes about Twilight felt dated. Richenthal wrote, "Parks and Recreation features too many hilarious characters to include such a gimmick."
