= ChicagoNow =

Blogging website

- ChicagoNow logo
- Website type: Blogging site
- Available in: English
- Dissolved: August 18, 2022; 4 years ago
- Owner: Tribune Publishing
- Website: www.chicagonow.com
- Commercial: Yes
- Registration: Optional
- Launched: August 2009; 17 years ago

ChicagoNow was a blogging site managed by Tribune Publishing, owner of the print Chicago Tribune newspaper. It featured a network of blogs of international, national, and local interest on a variety of topics ranging from crime to public schools to politics and diplomacy.

Notable ChicagoNow contributors included the staff of the Chicago Reporter, and Shimer College president Susan Henking.

On August 18, 2022, the site was shut down with no announcement.

== History ==
ChicagoNow was launched in August 2009. Its launch coincided with the Tribune company's bankruptcy. As a newspaper-run blogging community, with the initial tagline "a blog by and for locals", it represented what one observer called "a new value proposition for newspapers".

ChicagoNow used Movable Type as its blogging platform when it first launched, then switched to WordPress in 2011.

The website of the Tribune daily RedEye was initially hosted on ChicagoNow but later moved to its own domain.

After the acquisition of the Tribune by Alden Global Capital, ChicagoNow was shut down without warning on August 18, 2022.

== Reception ==
In April 2010, the World Editors Forum described ChicagoNow as a "hyperlocal blog network" that has "a personal quality that many larger newspapers lack."

In September 2010, Time Out Chicago criticized ChicagoNow for hosting an unidentified police officer in what they called "a hate-filled, racist rant by blogger Joe the Cop entitled 'The ghetto shooting template' for three days and counting now." ChicagoNow removed the posts in question, stating that while they don't edit posts, they reserve the right to remove them.
