= James Davenport =

James Davenport may refer to:

- James H. Davenport (born 1953), professor of information technology at the University of Bath
- James Davenport (clergyman) (1716–1757), American clergyman from Connecticut
- James Davenport (Connecticut politician) (1758–1797), American lawyer, U.S. Congressman from Connecticut
- Jim Davenport (journalist) (1958–2012), American journalist with the Associated Press based in South Carolina
- James S. Davenport (1864–1940), American lawyer, U.S. Congressman from Oklahoma
- Jim Davenport (1933–2016), baseball player
- Kenny Davenport (James Kenyon Davenport, 1862–1908), English international footballer
- James Potter Davenport (1841–1905), Los Angeles, California, City Council member who was the first official in the United States to be removed from office in a recall election
- James C. Davenport (born 1938), physicist and one of the founders of the National Society of Black Physicists
