= Practice Date =

- Parks and Recreation episode
- Episode no.: Season 2 Episode 4
- Directed by: Alex Hardcastle
- Written by: Harris Wittels
- Original air date: October 8, 2009

Guest appearances
- Louis C.K. as Dave Sanderson; Jay Jackson as Perd Hapley; Jim O'Heir as Jerry Gergich; Retta as Donna Meagle; Kevin Symons as Bill Dexhart; Jama Williamson as Wendy Haverford

Episode chronology
← Previous "Beauty Pageant"	Next → "Sister City"
- Parks and Recreation season 2

"Practice Date" is the fourth episode of the second season of Parks and Recreation, and the tenth overall episode of the series. It originally aired on NBC in the United States on October 8, 2009. In the episode, Ann takes Leslie to dinner to help prepare for her first date, while the rest of the parks department tries to learn secrets about each other as part of a game.

The episode was written by Harris Wittels and directed by Alex Hardcastle. It featured stand-up comedian Louis C.K. in his third guest appearance as Dave Sanderson, a Pawnee police officer who develops a romantic interest in Leslie. The episode also featured a fictional sex scandal mirroring the real-life 2009 scandal of South Carolina Governor Mark Sanford.

"Practice Date" was the first episode to establish the personality of Jerry as the co-worker everyone else in the office picks on, and marked the first of several appearances by Jay Jackson as news reporter Perd Hapley. According to Nielsen Media Research, the episode was seen by 4.97 million household viewers, an improvement over the previous week's episode, "Beauty Pageant". "Practice Date" received generally positive reviews, with several commentators praising it for fleshing out the characters of Ron and Tom.

== Plot ==
The episode opens with Leslie and the rest of the Parks department watching media coverage of Pawnee Councilman Bill Dexhart, a married man, admitting to having four-way sex in a Brazilian cave while pretending to be "building houses for the underprivileged". He tries to justify it by saying that it was his birthday on the day of the foursome, and that he "...really wanted to do it." Tom insists nobody could find any scandalous information about him, prompting the parks department employees to start a game to see who can get the most dirt on each other. Meanwhile, Leslie tells Ann she is nervous about her first date with Pawnee police officer Dave Sanderson. Ann offers to take Leslie on a practice date to help Leslie prepare for the real date. During the practice date, Ann realizes that Leslie has a serious problem: Leslie brought note cards with "topics of conversation" and engages in fake-sounding "practice laughing."

Ann decides to use exposure therapy on Leslie to help her deal with the worst-case date scenario. She acts very mean to Leslie, who is initially horrified, but she eventually stands up to Ann. When Ann tells her she is now ready for anything, Leslie feels cheered up and very confident. They go to a bar later to celebrate, where Leslie gets very drunk. After leaving Ann, she visits Dave's house to tell him that she was nervous about their upcoming date, but now realizes he is lucky to have her because of how "awesome" she is. A seemingly annoyed Dave brings Leslie home. The next day, Leslie feels horrible for ruining her chances with Dave. He arrives at her office later and she starts to apologize, but he says she can make it up to them on their second date, thereby reassuring her the first date is already over. Leslie once again feels cheered up.

Meanwhile, during the office game, Mark announces Jerry's adoptive mother was arrested for marijuana possession. A distraught Jerry said he did not know he was adopted and re-iterates that he never wanted to be a part of the game, making Mark feel terribly guilty. Later, Ron declares himself the winner to Tom, telling him he knows Tom's marriage to Wendy is a green card marriage to prevent her from being deported to Canada. A desperate Tom turns to Mark for help in finding dirt on Ron, and Mark suggests Tom visit an out-of-town bar and speak to Ron's old friend Duke Silver. Tom visits the bar and learns Duke Silver is actually the alter ego of Ron himself, who secretly plays saxophone in a jazz club. Tom confronts Ron, who immediately calls a truce to the game to prevent his secret from getting out. After watching more footage of Dexhart, Mark decides he wants Ann to learn all his own dark secrets from him. He visits her late at night and tells her about an affair he had with a married woman at age 16, among other secrets. Although initially confused, Ann is ultimately flattered by the gesture. April, disappointed nobody found dirt on her, frustratedly announces she drove a lawnmower through a Nordstrom department store, and she had the security footage of the event posted online.

== Production ==
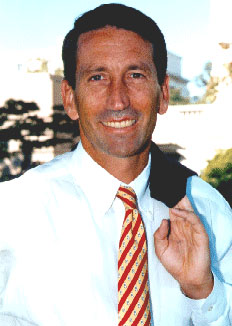
The sex scandal involving a Pawnee councilman in "Practice Date" closely mirrors the real-life scandal of South Carolina Governor Mark Sanford.

"Practice Date" was written by Harris Wittels and directed by Alex Hardcastle. The episode featured stand-up comedian Louis C.K. in his third guest performance as Dave Sanderson, a Pawnee police officer romantically involved with Leslie. Kevin Symons also appeared as Pawnee Councilman Bill Dexhart. The sex scandal involving Dexhart mirrored the real-life 2009 scandal of South Carolina Governor Mark Sanford, who publicly admitted to a long-time extramarital affair with an Argentinian woman.

Parks and Recreation co-creator Michael Schur conceived the idea for Ron Swanson's jazz musician alter ego before they learned Nick Offerman actually played the saxophone in real life, and had for his entire life. Offerman praised the decision: "When he came to me and said, 'You're going to have an alter ego who plays jazz saxophone,' I go, 'How do you see inside me?'" After the episode broadcast, NBC created an official "Duke Silver" website, which included a biography, discography, reviews, gallery, tour schedule and booking information for the fictional band.

"Practice Date" marked a turning point for the character Jerry. Prior to the episode, Jerry had appeared in every episode, but his personality had not yet been developed. Schur said the Parks and Recreation staff liked Jim O'Heir, so they cast him in the show and "figured we'd work it out later". After the scene when Mark inadvertently reveals Jerry was adopted, the writers built upon that joke and established Jerry as the co-worker the rest of the department picks on. Schur said after "Practice Date", "We realized that's who he is: He's the guy who wants to put his head down and get his pension, but is asking for it all the time. In the next three scripts, it was like throwing chum into the water. Every script after that had 15 slams on Jerry. "Practice Date" marked the first of several appearances by Jay Jackson as Pawnee news reporter Perd Hapley. The character was only originally intended for one appearance, but Schur said the staff enjoyed his performance so much that they made him a recurring character.

Within a week of the episode's original broadcast, three deleted scenes from "Practice Date" were made available on the official Parks and Recreation website. The first clip features approximately two minutes of extended scenes, including Leslie talking about her anxiety about the date, Ann offering her advice, a drunk Leslie complaining about the heat in Dave's apartment, which he secretly tells the camera is "freezing cold right now". The second 75-second clip features more of Pawnee City Councilman Bill Dexhart's press conference about the sex scandal. Dexhart refuses to promise he will not continue his transgressions, which he insists is a sign he is no longer lying to Pawnee residents. Reporters also discuss Dexhart's credit card bills, which include purchases Dong-O-Rama Sex Toy Company, Smut Doctors and a product called "vibrating raisins". In the third 75-second clip, Ron discusses in detail his "scientifically perfect ten-point scale of human beauty", the criteria for which he admits is "extremely misogynistic". It also included more footage of Ron's Duke Silver persona, along with interviews by older women who fantasize about him.

== Cultural references ==
Leslie worries she will bring up the genocide in the Sudanese country Darfur too much, or not enough, during her first date with Dave. While describing his scale of the attractiveness of women, Ron says tennis star Steffi Graf is a "perfect ten". Ron believes Tom is wearing the robes of the Taliban, a Sunni Islamist political movement, in a photo he finds for the contest. The photo is actually of Tom wearing a Halloween costume of a Jedi from the Star Wars universe. Tom learns African American co-worker Donna donated money to David Duke, a white nationalist involved in the Ku Klux Klan, because "he promised to lower taxes".

== Reception ==
Parks and Rec has, on average, been the best part of NBC's Thursday lineup since this season began. ... They figured the show out. And it's really good. And I hope like hell that the ratings improve, soon.

— Alan Sepinwall, The Star-Ledger

In its original American broadcast on October 8, 2009, "Practice Date" was seen by 4.97 million household viewers, according to Nielsen Media Research. The episode received a 2.2 rating/6 share among viewers aged between 18 and 49. It was an improvement over the previous two episodes, which drew 4.22 million household viewers and 4.63 million household viewers, respectively.

The episode received generally positive reviews, with several commentators praising it for fleshing out more information about the supporting cast, such at Ron's jazz singer persona and the back story behind Tom's marriage and chronic flirting. In an article reflecting on the show's second season, Slate magazine writer Jonah Weiner dubbed "Practice Date" the episode in which Parks and Recreation "truly hit its stride". In particular, he called the background-check game "a funny, economical way to bring them more vividly to life", and said the green card marriage subplot "at once punctured (Tom's) slimy façade and deepened our sympathies for him". Entertainment Weekly writer Henning Fog called "Practice Date" "the most satisfying comedy of the week", even compared to the wedding of Jim and Pam on The Office and a Seinfeld reunion on Curb Your Enthusiasm. Fog said the episode "managed to be sweet and sharp and absolutely hilarious" at once, and praised Poehler's improvising and Ron's jazz singer persona, but he said Mark's appearance at Ann's house to confess his life's sins was the episode's "weak spot".

Alan Sepinwall of The Star-Ledger said the episode was "completely satisfying - funny when it needed to be, sweet when it wanted to be". Sepinwall said Jones was particularly funny during the fake date, as well as the "constant one-upsmanship" between Ron and Tom. Matt Fowler of IGN said the episode had a "winning formula". He particularly praised Jones during the practice date, as well as Jerry's role during the contest, which Fowler said was a good way to allow the supporting cast to work together. Steve Heisler of The A.V. Club said it seemed like the episode "took everything they were warming up to over the last few weeks, and hit them hard". Heisler particularly praised Poehler's performance, as well as the interactions between Ron and Tom. In contrast, however, A.V. Club writer Leonard Pierce said "Practice Date" "was the first time all year I felt like P&R wasn't firing on all cylinders".

== DVD release ==
"Practice Date", along with the other 23 second season episodes of Parks and Recreation, was released on a four-disc DVD set in the United States on November 30, 2010. The DVD included deleted scenes for each episode.
