= Beauty Pageant (Parks and Recreation) =

- Parks and Recreation episode
- Episode no.: Season 2 Episode 3
- Directed by: Jason Woliner
- Written by: Katie Dippold
- Original air date: October 1, 2009

Guest appearances
- Louis C.K. as Dave Sanderson; April Marie Eden as Trish Ianetta; Anne Elizabeth Gregory as Susan; Worth Howe as Charles; Frank Medrano as Ray; Jim Meskimen as Martin Housely; Jim O'Heir as Jerry Gergich; Retta as Donna Meagle; Susan Yeagley as Jessica Wicks

Episode chronology
← Previous "The Stakeout"	Next → "Practice Date"
- Parks and Recreation season 2

"Beauty Pageant" is the third episode of the second season of the American comedy television series Parks and Recreation, and the ninth overall episode of the series. It originally aired on NBC in the United States on October 1, 2009. In the episode, Leslie serves as a judge in the Miss Pawnee beauty pageant and becomes determined to prevent an attractive, but talentless and unintelligent, contestant from winning.

The episode was written by Katie Dippold and directed by Jason Woliner. It featured stand-up comedian Louis C.K. in his second guest appearance as Dave Sanderson, a Pawnee police officer who develops a romantic interest in Leslie. According to Nielsen Media Research, the episode was seen by 4.63 million households, a slight improvement over the previous week. "Beauty Pageant" received generally positive reviews, with several commentators claiming the season continued a trend of funnier episodes than in the first season.

It is the only episode of the series in which Nick Offerman does not appear as Ron Swanson.

== Plot ==
At the beginning of the episode, Leslie proudly announces to the parks and recreation staff that she will be judging the Miss Pawnee beauty pageant, a job she takes very seriously. Tom, excited at the prospect of judging women on the basis of their looks, pulls some strings to get a spot on the judging panel along with Leslie. April enters the contest in order to win the $600 prize, despite being disgusted with the concept of a beauty contest. She tries, unsuccessfully, to gain an advantage by sucking up to Leslie. Later, Pawnee police officer Dave Sanderson visits Leslie at work to ask her out on a date. She initially accepts, but when Dave mistakes a photo of Madeleine Albright for Leslie's grandmother, Leslie becomes reluctant.

Meanwhile, Ann offers to cook Mark a cheap meal if he will fix her broken shower; Mark accepts what he calls "the weirdest second date ever". That night, the date goes well, until Ann takes her trash outside and finds her ex-boyfriend Andy is spying on her from the construction pit near her house, where he is now living. Back inside, Ann complains about Andy to Mark, who thinks they should invite Andy inside when it starts to rain. Ann reluctantly agrees, and Andy spends the rest of the night interrupting their conversations and spoiling romantic moments. After dinner, Ann kicks him out, but Andy remains convinced the night went very well for him.

Leslie and Tom arrive at the pageant. Leslie, who wants the Miss Pawnee winner to be dignified and graceful, favors Susan, a student and children's hospital volunteer. But the other judges favor Trish, an attractive but untalented and unintelligent woman. Tom is particularly impressed with Trish, even when she answers Leslie's question about how "we as citizens can improve on the great experiment?" by making fluffy remarks about America and expressing a distaste for immigrants. April puts on an act by pretending to be a shallow beauty contestant, but instantly quits when she learns the $600 prize actually consists of gift certificates for a fence company.

After the contest, the judges deliberate. Tom and the other judges all immediately agree Trish should win, but Leslie insists on further discussion. She pushes for Susan to win, but the judges eventually settle on Trish. After the pageant ends, Leslie makes a speech congratulating Susan anyway, and claiming the "Susans" of the world will carry on, even when they lose to the "Trishes" of the world. Dave approaches Leslie at the pageant and asks her again on a date. When she hesitates, he tells her she should call him if she changes her mind. As Dave leaves, he bumps into Trish, whom he pushes past without much notice, impressing Leslie. They set up a date the next day and Dave tries to impress Leslie by showing he has memorized the names of all the female politicians in her photographs. Meanwhile, Tom has tried to pick up girls at the pageant by giving them his house keys with none of them showing up, but he reveals that he has been robbed twice.

== Production ==
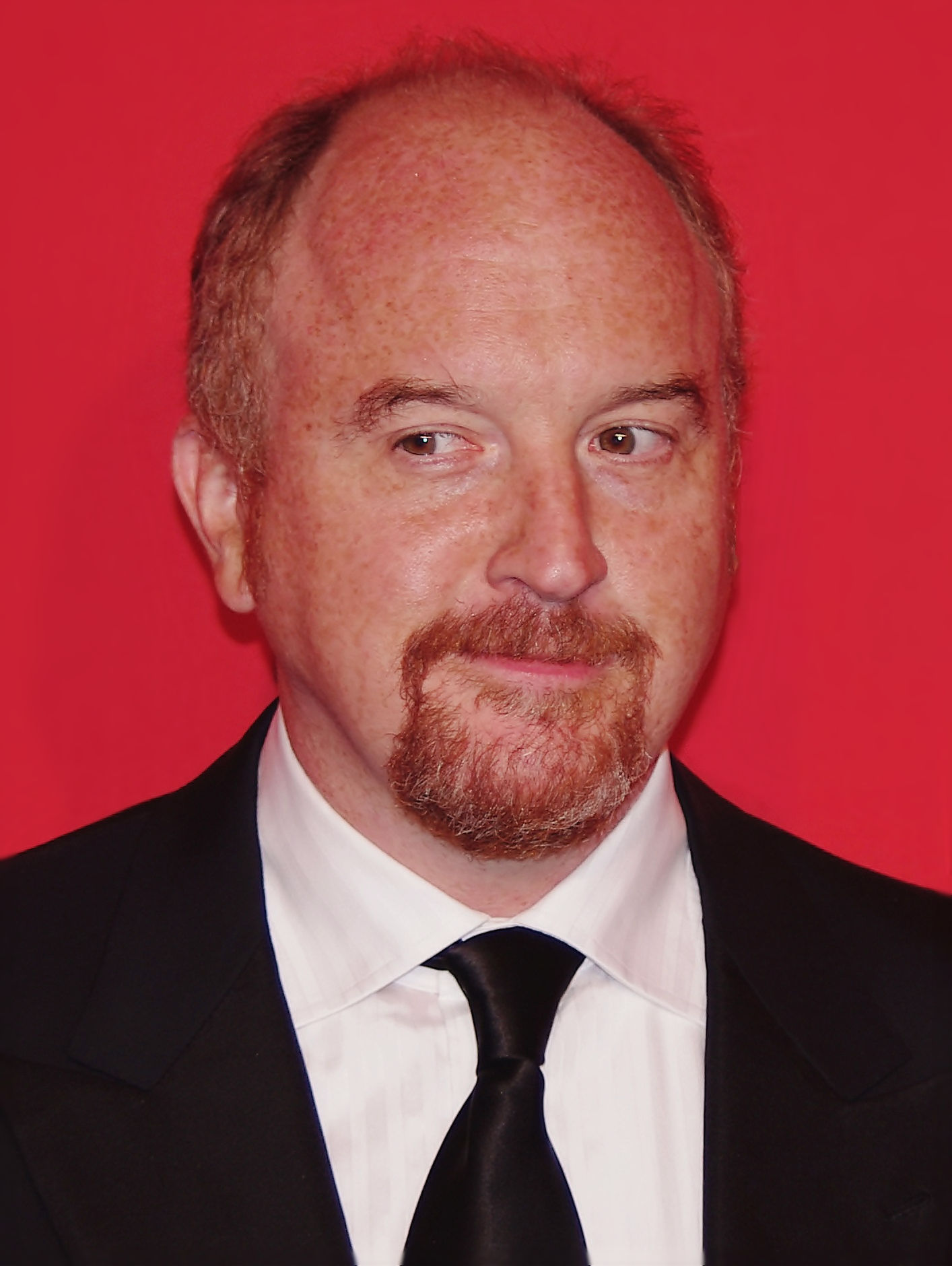
Stand-up comedian Louis C.K. guest starred as Officer Dave Sanderson in "Beauty Pageant".

"Beauty Pageant" was written by Katie Dippold and directed by Jason Woliner. Woliner directed and co-created the MTV sketch comedy show Human Giant, which also featured Parks co-star Aziz Ansari. "Beauty Pageant" featured stand-up comedian Louis C.K. in his second guest performance as Dave Sanderson, a Pawnee police officer romantically interested in Leslie. The Miss Pawnee Pageant is modeled after the long-standing Miss America competition, which awards scholarships to young women from all 50 states. Several commentators compared Trish, who is attractive but unintelligent and untalented, to Caitlin Upton, the 2007 Miss South Carolina Teen USA who made an incoherent response during the Miss Teen USA 2007 pageant. Series co-creator Michael Schur also indicated the episode was inspired partially by Carrie Prejean, the former Miss California USA who received nationwide attention over her answer to a question about same-sex marriage during the Miss USA 2009 contest. Immediately after "Beauty Pageant" was originally broadcast, NBC set up an official Miss Pawnee Beauty Pageant website at misspawnee.com. It included biographies for the judges and competitors, as well as a downloadable PDF of Leslie's custom scorecard from the episode, ringtones, band posters, songs for download and photos.

Within a week of the episode's original broadcast, three deleted scenes from "Beauty Pageant" were made available on the official Parks and Recreation website. In the first 90-second clip, April seeks beauty contestant advice from Leslie, who tells her to act differently from her usual behavior. While awaiting the talent contest, April lists a number of her unusual talents, including inventing emoticons, convincing her mother she is adopted, instantly making security guards suspicious and determining if someone is fat or pregnant "with 60 percent accuracy". In the second 1-minute and 15 second clip, Ann tries to explain to Mark she is not hinting at sex when she asks him to "fix her shower", and Sanderson talks about his insecurities, including that Leslie might be too smart for him. In the final 90-second clip, Tom expresses anger that the swimsuit competition has been removed from the contest, and tries to convince the judges to reinstate it during their deliberations.

== Cultural references ==
"Beauty Pageant" included several cultural and pop culture references. During her introduction at the pageant, Trish said, "I've been on YouTube", a reference to the video sharing website on which users can upload and share videos. Susan is said to have attended Indiana State University, which helps solidify her standing as the smartest beauty pageant contestant. Leslie said one of her criteria categories as a judge is the "Naomi Wolf factor", a reference to the American third-wave feminist author and political consultant. Leslie attempts to convince the other judges that Trish should not win the pageant, which in addition to the scenery is mirroring the courtroom drama 12 Angry Men. Sanderson, who has demonstrated a lack of pop culture familiarity in the show, was unfamiliar with a reference Tom made to the 1988 police action film Die Hard and its famous protagonist, John McClane.

== Reception ==
Hot diggity damn, that was a great episode. And not only does it continue the show's hot streak, but it does so in a way that bodes well for the rest of the season. Leslie's becoming less of a caricature by the episode, and the supporting cast has rarely been better.

— Steve Heisler,
The A.V. Club

In its original American broadcast on October 1, 2009, "Beauty Pageant" was seen by 4.63 million households, according to Nielsen Media Research. Although one of the poorer major network ratings of the night, it constituted a slight increase over the previous week's episode, "The Stakeout". The episode received a 1.9 rating/5 share among viewers aged between 18 and 49. The episode received generally positive reviews, with several commentators claiming the season continued a trend of funnier episodes than in the first season. Alan Sepinwall of The Star-Ledger said the show seemed to be more confident. He praised the silliness of Andy, the deadpan humor of April and "the sweetness of Leslie realizing how much she likes Dave the cop".

H.T. "Hercules" Strong, a regular columnist with Ain't it Cool News, said "Beauty Pageant" was "as funny as one of the funniest episodes of The Office, which is saying something." He particularly praised Louis C.K. Steve Heisler of The A.V. Club called "Beauty Pageant" a great episode, and said Leslie is becoming less of a caricature than in previous episodes. He gave it an A− grade particularly praised Plaza, who he said "embodied pure apathy" and Pratt, who he said livened up the Ann and Mark subplot. Entertainment Weekly writer Henning Fog said Parks and Recreation has continued to improve each week, and "Beauty Pageant" showed Leslie Knope at "her most human". Fog also said he liked the Ann, Andy and Mark characters, but felt the show was straining to find ways to include them in the story each week. Matt Fowler of IGN said he was glad Parks and Recreation was exploring subplots outside of the pit, but felt a beauty pageant was too clichéd and predictable an episode plot. Fowler praised the performances of Plaza, Pratt and Louis C.K. Slate magazine writer Jonah Weiner praised "Beauty Pageant", and called the hypocrisy of beauty contests demonstrated in the episode "a turkey shoot no less enjoyable for its familiarity".

== DVD release ==
"Beauty Pageant", along with the other 23 second-season episodes of Parks and Recreation, was released on a four-disc DVD set in the United States on November 30, 2010. The DVD included deleted scenes for each episode.
