= Parks and Recreation =

American television sitcom (2009–2015)

- Also known as: Parks and Rec
- Genre: Sitcom; Mockumentary; Political satire; Workplace comedy; Cringe comedy
- Created by: Greg Daniels; Michael Schur
- Showrunner: Michael Schur
- Starring: Amy Poehler; Rashida Jones; Paul Schneider; Aziz Ansari; Nick Offerman; Aubrey Plaza; Chris Pratt; Adam Scott; Rob Lowe; Jim O'Heir; Retta; Billy Eichner
- Theme music composer: Gaby Moreno; Vincent Jones
- Country of origin: United States
- Original language: English
- No. of seasons: 7
- No. of episodes: 126 (list of episodes)

Production
- Executive producers: Greg Daniels; Michael Schur; Howard Klein; David Miner; Morgan Sackett; Dean Holland; Dan Goor
- Producer: Amy Poehler
- Camera setup: Single camera
- Running time: 22–42 minutes
- Production companies: Open 4 Business Productions; Deedle-Dee Productions; Fremulon; 3 Arts Entertainment; Universal Television (Note: Previously credited as Universal Media Studios in seasons 1–4)

Original release
- Network: NBC
- Release: April 9, 2009 – February 24, 2015
- Release: April 30, 2020 (special)

Parks and Recreation (also known as Parks and Rec) is an American political satire mockumentary television sitcom created by Greg Daniels and Michael Schur. The series aired on NBC from April 9, 2009, to February 24, 2015, for 125 episodes, over seven seasons. A special reunion episode aired on April 30, 2020. The series stars Amy Poehler as Leslie Knope, a perky mid-level bureaucrat in the Parks and Recreation Department of the fictional town of Pawnee, Indiana. The ensemble and supporting cast features Rashida Jones as Ann Perkins, Aziz Ansari as Tom Haverford, Nick Offerman as Ron Swanson, Aubrey Plaza as April Ludgate, Chris Pratt as Andy Dwyer, Paul Schneider as Mark Brendanawicz, Adam Scott as Ben Wyatt, Rob Lowe as Chris Traeger, Jim O'Heir as Garry "Jerry" Gergich, Retta as Donna Meagle, and Billy Eichner as Craig Middlebrooks.

The writers researched local California politics for the series and consulted with urban planners and elected officials. Leslie Knope underwent major changes after the first season, in response to audience feedback that the character seemed unintelligent and "ditzy". The writing staff incorporated current events into the episodes, such as a government shutdown in Pawnee inspired by the 2008 financial crisis. Real-life political figures, including John McCain, Michelle Obama, Newt Gingrich, and Joe Biden, have cameos in later episodes.

Parks and Recreation was part of NBC's "Comedy Night Done Right" programming during its Thursday night prime-time block. The series received mixed reviews during its first season (including comparisons to The Office, a sitcom also produced by Daniels and Schur), but, after a re-approach to its tone and format, the second and subsequent seasons were widely acclaimed. Parks and Recreation received several awards and nominations, including 14 Primetime Emmy Award nominations (two for Outstanding Comedy Series), a Golden Globe Award win for Poehler's performance and a nomination for the Golden Globe Award for Best Television Series – Musical or Comedy, and a Peabody Award. In Time's 2012 year-end lists issue, Parks and Recreation was named the number one television series of that year. In 2013, after receiving four consecutive nominations in the category, Parks and Recreation won the Television Critics Association Award for Outstanding Achievement in Comedy.

== Plot ==
The first season focuses on Leslie Knope, the deputy director of the Parks and Recreation Department in the fictional town of Pawnee, Indiana. Local nurse Ann Perkins demands the construction pit beside her house created by an abandoned condo development be filled in after her boyfriend, Andy Dwyer, fell in and broke both legs. Leslie promises to turn the pit into a park, despite resistance from the parks director Ron Swanson, an anti-government libertarian. City planner Mark Brendanawicz – for whom Leslie harbors romantic feelings – pragmatically insists the project is unrealistic due to government red tape, but nevertheless secretly convinces Ron to approve the project. Leslie and her staff, including her assistant Tom Haverford and intern April Ludgate, try encouraging community interest in the pit project, but meet resistance.

In the second season, the pit is eventually filled in because Leslie takes it upon herself to fill in the pit without permission, not realizing Andy was in the pit. Andy became injured and works with Leslie to threaten to sue the city of Pawnee unless the pit was filled. Mark leaves his city hall career for a private sector job. Meanwhile, a crippling budget deficit leads state auditors Chris Traeger and Ben Wyatt to shut down the Pawnee government temporarily.

The third season opens with the Pawnee government reopened, but with budget cuts frustrating Leslie's attempts to provide services. Leslie makes a deal with Chris and Ben to bring back the Pawnee Harvest Festival, but if the festival fails the Parks Department will be eliminated. After weeks of planning, the festival becomes a tremendous success through Leslie's efforts. Later, Chris returns from Indianapolis to become Pawnee's acting city manager, while Ben also takes a job in Pawnee. April and Andy start dating and, only a few weeks later, marry in a surprise ceremony. Tom quits his city hall job to form an entertainment company called Entertainment 720 with his friend, Jean-Ralphio. The business cannot maintain its lavish spending and quickly runs out of money, leaving Tom to return to the Parks Department. Leslie and Ben show romantic interest in each other; however, Chris has implemented a rule that would prevent a superior (Ben) from dating his employee (Leslie). In spite of this rule, Leslie and Ben begin secretly dating.

The fourth season deals with Leslie's campaign to run for city council. As Leslie begins preparing a campaign, she realizes she must break up with Ben to avoid scandal. Ben and Leslie restart their relationship and Ben sacrifices his job to save Leslie from losing hers, due to Chris' policy against romantic relationships in the workplace. The Parks Department volunteers to become her campaign staff, with Ben as Leslie's campaign manager. Leslie's campaign faces myriad setbacks against her main opponent, Bobby Newport, and his famous campaign manager Jennifer Barkley.

In the fifth season, Leslie begins working as a City Councilor but finds opposition from angry locals and her fellow councilmen. Ben is at his new job on a congressional campaign in Washington DC, alongside April whom he brought along as an intern. Ron begins a romantic relationship with a woman named Diane. Ben returns to Pawnee and proposes to Leslie. They get married midway through the season. Tom starts a successful business named Rent-A-Swag that rents high-end clothing to teenagers. Leslie and Ben plan a fundraising event for the park, now called the Pawnee Commons, and decide to have an impromptu wedding that night in City Hall. Later, Leslie's changes to Pawnee lead to several locals petitioning for her to be recalled from office.

The sixth season begins with the absorption of Eagleton by Pawnee after the former town declares bankruptcy. As the governments merge, Leslie loses the recall vote and returns to the Parks Department full-time, while Ben is voted in as the next city manager. Tom sells Rent-A-Swag to Jean-Ralphio's father, Dr. Saperstein, in a cash settlement and opens a restaurant called "Tom's Bistro". Ann and Chris, now in a relationship and expecting a baby, leave Pawnee for Michigan. As a way to garner public support for the unpopular merger, the Parks Department hold a Unity Concert. Later, Leslie reveals she is pregnant with triplets. Leslie takes the job as regional director for the National Park Service in Chicago, immediately submitting a proposal to bring the job to Pawnee.

The seventh season, though it aired in 2015, takes place in 2017. Ron and Leslie are shown to be enemies due to Ron's company having torn down Ann's old house in order to build an apartment building. Ben convinces a technology company, Gryzzl, to bring free Wi-Fi to the city of Pawnee. Gryzzl engages in intense data mining, inducing Ron, whose new construction company, Very Good Building and Development Company, has been handling their construction needs, to reconnect with Leslie to correct the issue.

== Cast and characters ==
The cast of the first and second seasons of Parks and Recreation included (from left to right), Paul Schneider, Aziz Ansari, Amy Poehler, Rashida Jones, Nick Offerman, Aubrey Plaza, and Chris Pratt.

The principal cast starting in season one included:

- Amy Poehler as Leslie Knope, a mid-level bureaucrat with a strong love of her hometown of Pawnee, who has not let politics dampen her sense of optimism; her ultimate goal is to become President of the United States. She has an admirable work ethic, though can be excessively single-minded in pursuit of her goals.
- Rashida Jones as Ann Perkins, a nurse and political outsider who gradually becomes more involved in Pawnee government through her friendship with Leslie. She has a string of unsuccessful relationships early in the series and struggles to find her own identity.
- Paul Schneider as Mark Brendanawicz, a city planner who entered the field with a sense of optimism, but has since become jaded and disillusioned.
- Aziz Ansari as Tom Haverford, Leslie's sarcastic, swaggering, and womanizing subordinate, who eventually considers leaving his city hall job to pursue his own entrepreneurial interests.
- Nick Offerman as Ron Swanson, the parks and recreation director, a staunch libertarian who values masculinity, leads a minimalist lifestyle, and is stubbornly independent. Despite his distaste for government, he shows a grudging respect for the members of his department, particularly Leslie.
- Aubrey Plaza as April Ludgate, initially a cynical and deadpan intern with a macabre sense of humor, she eventually grows into the role of Ron's assistant.
- Chris Pratt as Andy Dwyer, a goofy and dim-witted but lovable slacker and rock musician; Ann's ex-boyfriend, married to April. Goes on to become a children's entertainer, as "Johnny Karate".
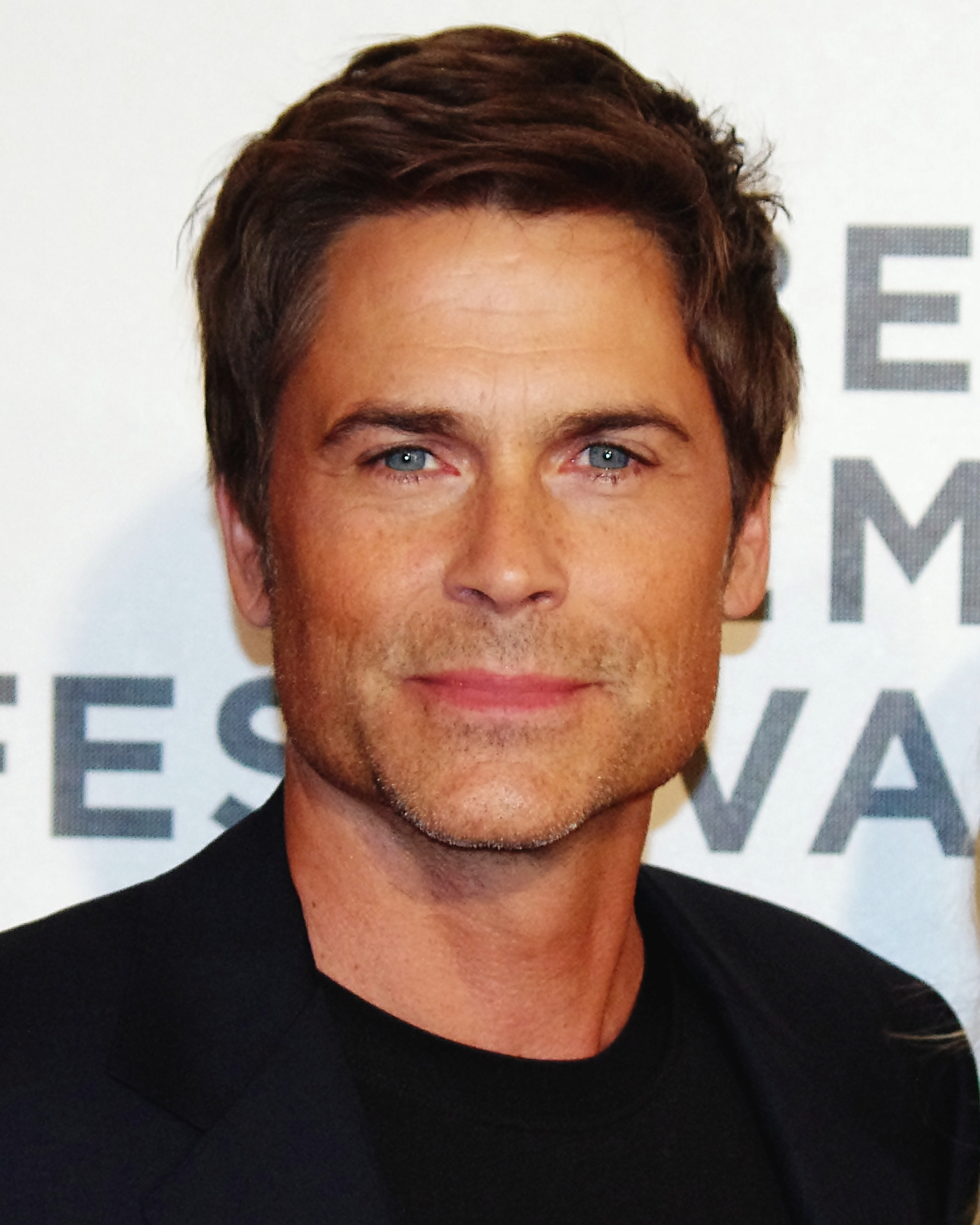
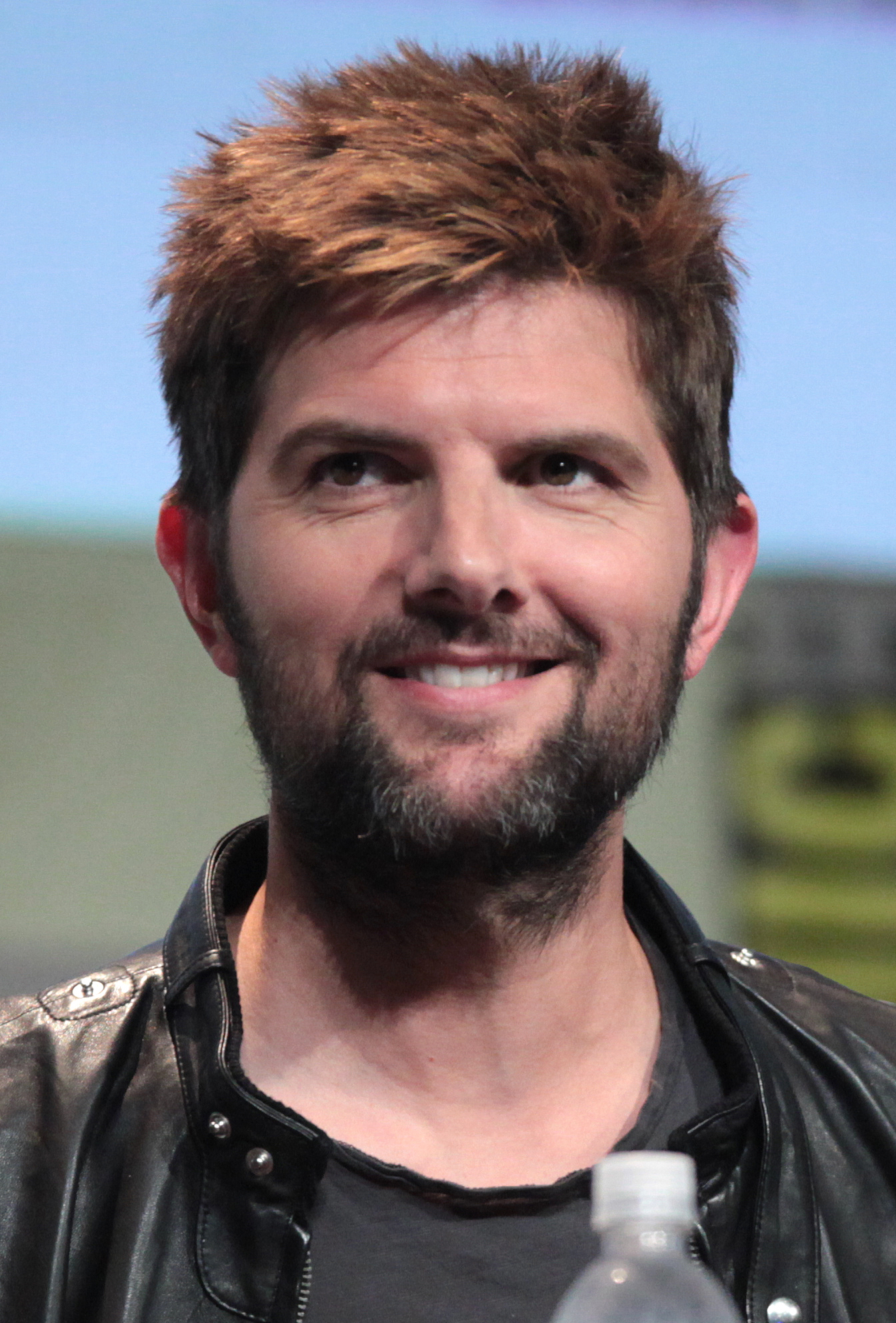
Rob Lowe (left) and Adam Scott (right) joined the cast of Parks and Recreation during the last two episodes of the second season.

Several cast members were introduced or developed after the first season:

- Adam Scott as Ben Wyatt, a brilliant but socially awkward government official trying to redeem his past as a failed mayor in his youth.
- Rob Lowe as Chris Traeger, an extremely positive and obsessively health-conscious government official.
- Jim O'Heir as Garry "Jerry" / "Larry" / "Terry" Gergich. Picked on by his coworkers and initially falling into the role of the “office idiot”, later seasons subvert this trope as his impressive life outside of work is gradually revealed.
- Retta as Donna Meagle, an employee of the parks department, who leads a seemingly superficial, hedonistic lifestyle, but is also deeply caring and loyal.
- Billy Eichner as Craig Middlebrooks, an overly passionate government employee who began working for Pawnee when Eagleton merged with Pawnee.

Numerous actors have made recurring guest appearances throughout the series, including Pamela Reed as Leslie's mother and fellow politician Marlene Griggs-Knope, Ben Schwartz as Tom's fast-talking friend Jean-Ralphio, Jenny Slate as Jean-Ralphio's twin sister Mona-Lisa, Jama Williamson as Tom's ex-wife Wendy, Mo Collins as morning talk show host Joan Callamezzo, Jay Jackson as television broadcaster Perd Hapley, Alison Becker as newspaper reporter Shauna Malwae-Tweep, Darlene Hunt as conservative activist Marcia Langman, and Andy Forrest as Andy's frequent shoeshine customer Kyle. Megan Mullally, the real-life wife of Nick Offerman, portrayed Ron's second ex-wife Tammy, while Patricia Clarkson appeared as his first ex-wife, also named Tammy. Lucy Lawless and Jon Glaser had recurring roles in the fifth and sixth seasons: Lawless as Ron's love interest (and later wife) Diane Lewis and Glaser as Leslie's archenemy on the city council Jeremy Jamm.

Mullally's performance was well received, which made the Parks and Recreation producers feel more comfortable about using celebrity guest actors in later episodes. Other such celebrity guests included Blake Anderson, Fred Armisen, Will Arnett, Kristen Bell, H. Jon Benjamin, Matt Besser, Chris Bosh, Louis C.K., The Decemberists, Sam Elliott, Will Forte, Ginuwine, Michael Gross, Jon Hamm, Nick Kroll, John Larroquette, Andrew Luck, Letters to Cleo, Natalie Morales, Parker Posey, Kathryn Hahn, Andy Samberg, J. K. Simmons, Roy Hibbert, Detlef Schrempf, Justin Theroux, Wilco, Henry Winkler, Peter Serafinowicz, and Yo La Tengo. Paul Rudd appeared in several season four episodes as Bobby Newport, Leslie's opponent in the City Council race, and returned for two episodes in the final season.

The series has had cameos by several real-life political figures, including then-Vice President Joe Biden, Senator Barbara Boxer, former Speaker of the House Newt Gingrich, Senator John McCain, First Lady Michelle Obama, former secretary of state Madeleine Albright, and senators Olympia Snowe, Cory Booker, and Orrin Hatch.

== Episodes ==
Seasons of Parks and Recreation
Season	Episodes	Originally released		Viewers (millions)
Season	Episodes	First released	Last released	Viewers (millions)
1	6	April 9, 2009	May 14, 2009	5.97
2	24	September 17, 2009	May 20, 2010	4.60
3	16	January 20, 2011	May 19, 2011	5.10
4	22	September 22, 2011	May 10, 2012	4.40
5	22	September 20, 2012	May 2, 2013	4.06
6	22	September 26, 2013	April 24, 2014	3.76
7	13	January 13, 2015	February 24, 2015	4.60
Special		April 30, 2020		3.64

== Production ==
=== Development and casting ===
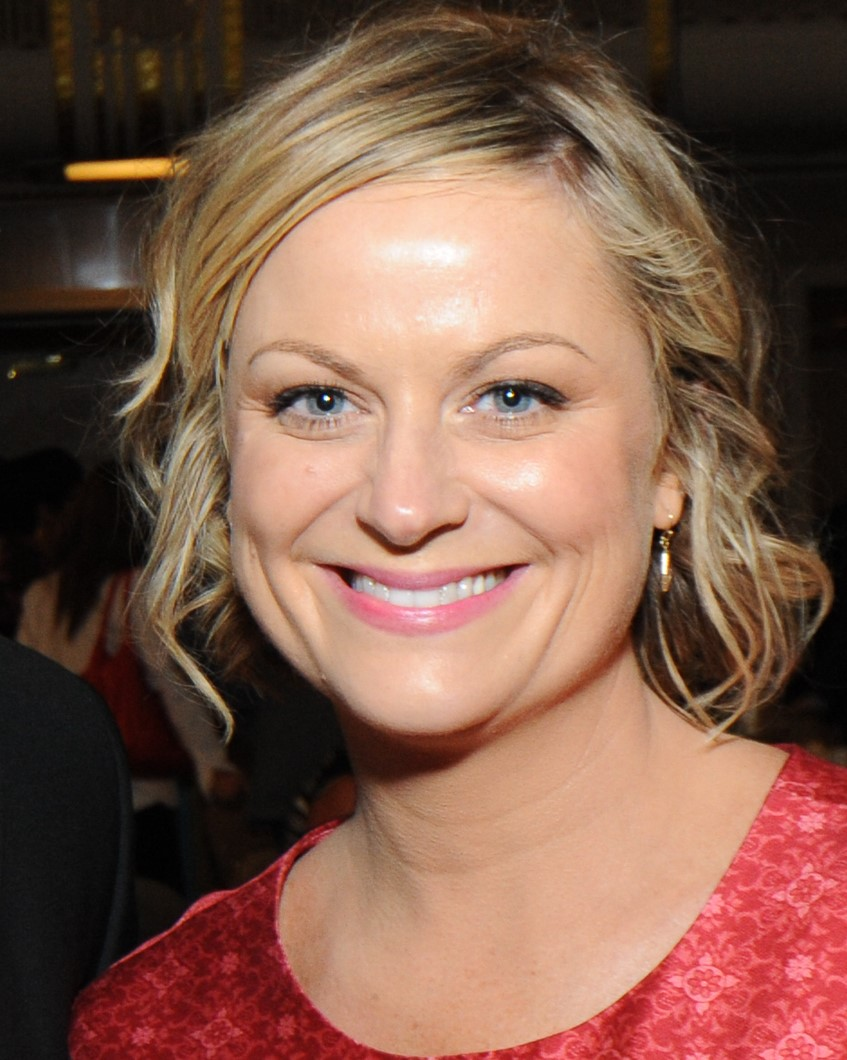
The concept for Parks and Recreation came together only after producers learned Amy Poehler (pictured) would be available to play the protagonist.

Immediately after Ben Silverman was named co-chairman of NBC's entertainment division in 2007, he asked Greg Daniels to create a spin-off of The Office. Daniels co-created Parks and Recreation with Michael Schur, who had been a writer on The Office. The two spent months considering ideas for the new series and debating whether to make it a stand-alone rather than a spin-off. According to Daniels, they eventually abandoned the original spin-off plan because they "couldn't find the right fit". They considered a series about a local government official trying to rebuild a political career following a humiliating public spectacle. They eventually abandoned the idea, though it did end up being incorporated into the backstory for Ben Wyatt late in the second season. After Amy Poehler agreed to play the lead, they decided the series would revolve around an optimistic bureaucrat in small-town government. Production was delayed to accommodate Poehler's pregnancy.

The idea was partly inspired by the portrayal of local politics on the HBO drama series The Wire, as well as the renewed interest in and optimism about politics stemming from the 2008 United States presidential election. The staff was also drawn to the idea of building a show around a female relationship, namely Leslie Knope and Ann Perkins. Reports that Daniels and Schur were developing a show together led to press speculation it would, in fact, be a spin-off of The Office. The producers insisted their new series would be entirely independent. Nevertheless, their concept for it shared several elements with The Office, particularly the mockumentary approach and the encouragement of improvisation among the cast, even though the episodes were scripted. The series was scheduled as a mid-season replacement, and was rushed to meet the premiere date of April 9, 2009. Before the title Parks and Recreation was chosen, the name Public Service was considered, but ultimately rejected because network officials did not want to be accused of mocking the idea.

Schur said at PaleyFest that he and Daniels approached casting with the idea of finding "the funniest people and we'll tailor the roles to them". Poehler departed from the NBC sketch comedy series Saturday Night Live, where she was a cast member for nearly seven years, to star in Parks and Recreation as Leslie Knope. It was only after she was cast that Daniels and Schur established the series' general concept and the script for the pilot was written. Rashida Jones was among the first to be cast by Daniels and Schur in 2008, when the series was still being considered as a spin-off to The Office, where Jones had played Jim Halpert's girlfriend Karen Filippelli, who formerly worked at the Stamford Branch but was soon transferred to the Scranton Branch in the third season. She departed in the middle of season six, and returned for a guest appearance later in the season. Jones returned in the series finale, along with the COVID-19 pandemic special.

Paul Schneider was cast as Mark Brendanawicz. He said early in the series he was insecure in the role because he was still trying to figure out the character's motivations. Schneider left the cast after the second season and the character is not referenced at any point during the remainder of the series' run. Similarly with Jones, Daniels and Schur had intended to cast Aziz Ansari from the earliest stages of the development of Parks and Recreation.

While Aubrey Plaza was in Los Angeles for a film, casting director Allison Jones, who cast the film Plaza was working on, asked her if she wanted to attend a meeting with a showrunner of The Office who was developing a pilot. A fan of The Office, Plaza agreed. According to Schur, Jones said to him, "I just met the weirdest, funniest girl I've ever met in my life, you should meet with her." At the meeting, Daniels asked Plaza about life and what she thought happens when people died and the two had a discussion on the topic. Plaza said that Schur likely found the conversation odd. They told her the idea for the show's pilot and that they were considering giving Poehler's character an assistant that was a doltish blonde. Plaza pitched them instead the character of a smart intern who is at the department only for college credit and does not care about the job, which Plaza thought would be an interesting, comedic contrast with Poehler's character. They liked the concept for the character and created April Ludgate.

Chris Pratt was originally intended to be a guest star, with his character Andy Dwyer initially meant to appear only in the first season, but the producers liked Pratt so much that, almost immediately after casting him, they decided to make him a regular cast member starting with season two. Adam Scott was cast as Ben Wyatt, while the future of Party Down, his Starz comedy series was uncertain; Party Down was subsequently cancelled after its second season. Scott first appeared in the penultimate second-season episode, "The Master Plan". Nick Offerman previously auditioned for the role of Michael Scott in The Office, which eventually went to Steve Carell. Offerman was originally considered for another role, but NBC felt that he wouldn't fit for a character who would later kiss Jones at some point in the series; he was cast instead as Ron Swanson. Rob Lowe was introduced as Chris Traeger alongside Scott and was originally expected to depart after a string of guest appearances, but later signed a multi-year contract to become a regular cast member. He departed from the series in the season six episode, "Ann and Chris", returning in the series finale and the 2020 special.

Jim O'Heir and Retta made regular appearances respectively as Garry "Jerry" Gergich and Donna Meagle since the first season, but their personalities did not become developed until the second season. Schur said the Parks and Recreation staff liked the actors so he decided to include them in the show and "figured we'd work it out later". A throwaway joke at Jerry's expense in the episode "Practice Date" led him to be established as the inept co-worker the rest of the department callously picks on. Donna was developed as a sassy hedonist whose mysterious life is occasionally hinted at. It was not until the third season they became considered regular cast members, and were added to the opening credits during the sixth season. Billy Eichner was a recurring cast member as Craig Middlebrooks during season 6, and began being billed as a member of the regular cast in the fourth episode of season seven.

=== Crew ===
Deedle-Dee Productions and Universal Media Studios produced Parks and Recreation starting with the first season; the production companies Fremulon and 3 Arts Entertainment also became involved with the show starting with the second season. The series was created by Greg Daniels and Michael Schur, who served as executive producers along with Howard Klein. Klein previously worked with Daniels and Schur on The Office, a half-hour NBC comedy Daniels adapted from the British comedy of the same name, created by Ricky Gervais and Stephen Merchant. Schur served as the showrunner of Parks and Recreation, while Amy Poehler and Morgan Sackett worked as producers. Dean Holland, an editor on The Office, also worked as an editor on Parks and Recreation. Mike Scully, a former executive producer and showrunner for The Simpsons, joined Parks and Recreation as a consulting producer starting in the middle of the first season. Allison Jones, who worked as a casting director for The Office, served in the same capacity at the start of Parks and Recreation, along with Nancy Perkins, for whom the character Ann Perkins was named. Dorian Frankel became the casting director starting with the second season. Alan Yang, Harris Wittels, and Katie Dippold, all of whom were Parks and Recreation screenwriters, also worked as executive story editors.

The pilot episode was written by Daniels and Schur, and directed by Daniels. Daniels also directed the second-season episode "Hunting Trip", while Schur made his directorial debut with the first-season finale "Rock Show", and wrote or directed several other episodes including "Sister City", "The Master Plan", and "Time Capsule".

Poehler wrote three episodes: "Telethon" in season 2, "The Fight" in season 3, and "The Debate" in season 4 (for which she was nominated for a Primetime Emmy Award for Outstanding Writing for a Comedy Series). She also co-wrote "Second Chunce" in season 6, the series' 100th episode, and "One Last Ride", the series finale, with Schur. Poehler also directed three episodes, "The Debate" in season 4, "Article Two" in season 5, and "Gryzzlbox" in season 7. Other cast members that wrote or directed episodes include Nick Offerman, who wrote "Lucky" in season 4, and directed season 5's "Correspondents' Lunch" and season 6's "Flu Season 2"; while Adam Scott directed season 6's "Farmers Market".

Holland also directed about thirty episodes of the series. Norm Hiscock, a consulting producer, wrote a number of episodes, including the first-season finale "Rock Show" and second-season premiere "Pawnee Zoo". Other regular screenwriters included Katie Dippold, Dan Goor, Aisha Muharrar, Harris Wittels, and Alan Yang. Frequent Parks and Recreation directors include Dean Holland, Randall Einhorn, Troy Miller, and Jason Woliner, with several others guest-directing one or two episodes such as Jeffrey Blitz, Paul Feig, Tucker Gates, Seth Gordon, Nicole Holofcener, Beth McCarthy-Miller, Michael McCullers, and Charles McDougall.

=== Writing ===
When we were talking about this, we were in the middle of the election. The economy hadn't collapsed yet, but we got the general sense that the government was going to be playing a more significant role in years to come. We had no idea how right we were.

— Michael Schur

The writers spent time researching local California politics and attending Los Angeles City Council meetings. Schur said they observed many community hearings were attended only by those opposed, often angrily, to the proposals under consideration. This fact became a major component of town hall scenes and was the basis for the "Canvassing" episode. The writers consulted with real-life government officials such as urban planners and elected officials. Scott Albright, a California city planner, provided direct feedback for the Mark Brendanawicz character, and the inspiration for Ron Swanson's anti-government convictions came from a real-life encounter Schur had in Burbank with a libertarian government official who admitted, "I don't really believe in the mission of my job." The concept of turning a construction pit into a park was seen as a device to bring all the characters together working toward a common goal. The writers originally envisioned the pit becoming a park only in the series finale, although those plans were later changed and the pit was filled in during the second season. While researching whether such a project could realistically last several months or longer, Schur spoke to urban planners in Claremont, California, who said it was entirely plausible because they had recently broken ground on a park that had been in various planning stages for 18 years.

Daniels and Schur wrote the script for the pilot episode in mid-2008. The original script portrayed Leslie and Mark as slightly less likable than they appeared in the final draft, and they were changed to be more appealing in response to feedback the episode received from focus groups and press tour screenings. For example, while an early draft of the pilot script had Mark saying he didn't care about Leslie or the pit but would support her plan because he liked Ann Perkins and wanted an excuse to spend more time with her, the finished pilot had Mark backing Leslie because he admired her passion and drive. Schur said the writing staff strove to avoid the type of cynical humor prevalent in most television comedies at the time and wanted the characters to have a genuine appreciation for each other. Schur said of this, "I've never liked mean-spirited comedy. The characters on our show make fun of each other, but not in a biting, angry way. And there's no shortage of conflict in the world of government." The first-season episodes were written and developed relatively quickly after each other, and Schur said the staff was treating the entire six-episode season as if it were a single television pilot. Daniels felt due to pre-expectations from viewers familiar with The Office, the first-season episodes were "just about trying to tell people what we weren't", and that the writers had a better understanding of the characters by season two and could better write to their strengths.

During the first season, the writing staff received audience feedback that Leslie Knope seemed unintelligent and "ditzy." Schur said the writers did not intend for Leslie to be stupid, but rather an overeager woman who "takes her job too seriously", so a particular effort was made to present that character as more intelligent and capable at her job starting in the second season. As critic Alan Sepinwall observed, three other significant changes for the second season were to build more of the show around the relationship between Leslie Knope and Ron Swanson; transforming Chris Pratt's Andy from the villain of the show to a lovable man-child; and "letting Tom and April be intimidated by Leslie rather than scornful of her". The staff also decided to move on from the construction pit story arc, having the pit filled in the second-season episode "Kaboom". Although it was originally conceived the pit would only become a park in the series finale, Schur said the plotline was accelerated because early episodes were too focused on the pit and had led viewers to believe the entire show was about filling it in, which was not the writers' intention. Also starting with the second season, the writers made an effort to be more topical and incorporate current events into their scripts. For example, the episode "Pawnee Zoo" included social commentary about same-sex marriage. "The Stakeout" included a parody of the controversial arrest of Harvard University professor Henry Louis Gates, and a sex scandal involving a Pawnee councilman in "Practice Date" mirrored the real-life 2009 scandal of South Carolina Governor Mark Sanford.

Starting in the middle of the second season, the writing staff began to draw inspiration from the premise of The Contender (2000). Schur explained The Contender was about a female politician trying to succeed amid intense scrutiny in a political arena dominated by men, which is similar to challenges Leslie Knope occasionally encounters. The financial difficulties Pawnee experiences during the late second-season and third-season episodes were reflective of the 2008 financial crisis facing the nation and much of the world when the episodes were produced. The introduction of Chris Traeger and Ben Wyatt as state auditors visiting Pawnee, and the subsequent government shutdown, were inspired by news reports at a time when a number of states considered a shutdown of schools, parks, and other services due to the global recession. The third season included a seven-episode story arc about the characters organizing a harvest festival and staking the financial future of their department on its success. The festival served as a device to unite the characters, much like the construction pit had earlier in the show. Schur said this was done because the first six episodes were written and filmed early, and the writing staff felt having one concise storyline to tie them together kept the writers focused and, in Schur's words, helped "organize our tired, end-of-the-year brains". For the romance arc between Leslie and Ben in seasons three and four, The Remains of the Day was used as an inspiration, as a story about two people who are forced not to convey their romantic feelings for each other due to a repressive social system, which Schur compared to modern-day government.

=== Filming ===
Like The Office, Parks and Recreation was filmed with a single-camera setup in a cinéma vérité style simulating the look of an actual documentary, with no studio audience or laugh track. Within the context of the show, the characters are being filmed by a documentary crew, the members of which are never seen or heard from on-screen. The actors occasionally look at and directly address the cameras, and in some scenes directly engage the cameras in one-on-one interviews with the documentary crew members. The episodes were scripted, but the production encouraged the cast to improvise, and dialogue or performances the actors made up during filming often made the final cut of the episodes. Schur said he believes the mockumentary style is particularly fitting for a show about city government because "it's a device for showing the ways people act and behave differently when they're in public and private [and] the difference between what goes on behind closed doors and what people present to the public is a huge issue".

The Parks and Recreation producers approached each episode as if filming a real documentary. They typically shot enough for a 35 or 40-minute episode, then cut it down to 22 minutes, using the best material. Due to the improvisational acting and hand-held camerawork, a great deal of extra footage was shot that had to be discarded for the final cut; for example, the original cut of the 22-minute pilot was 48 minutes long. The producers filmed about nine pages of the script each day, a large amount by U.S. television standards.

Despite the similarities in the mockumentary style with The Office, Daniels and Schur sought to establish a slightly different tone in the camerawork of the pilot episode. The one-on-one interviews, for example, sometimes feature two separate camera angles on the same person; the footage is intercut to create the final version of the scene. This technique was inspired by The Five Obstructions, a 2003 experimental documentary directed by Lars von Trier and Jørgen Leth, which Daniels watched at the suggestion of actor Paul Schneider. Another distinction from The Office is while almost all footage from that show is filmed in a workplace setting, the documentary crew on Parks and Recreation regularly follows the characters into more intimate, non-work settings, such as on dates or at their homes. Parks and Recreation also makes frequent use of the jump cut technique. For instance, one scene in the pilot episode repeatedly jump cuts between brief clips in which Leslie seeks permission from Ron to pursue the pit project. Early in the season, editor Dean Holland developed a technique that would be used throughout the series. During a scene in "The Reporter" in which Leslie reacts to quotes read to her by the journalist, Poehler improvised several jokes, many of which were ultimately going to be cut from the episode. Holland thought they were all funny, so he created a brief montage intercutting several of the lines.

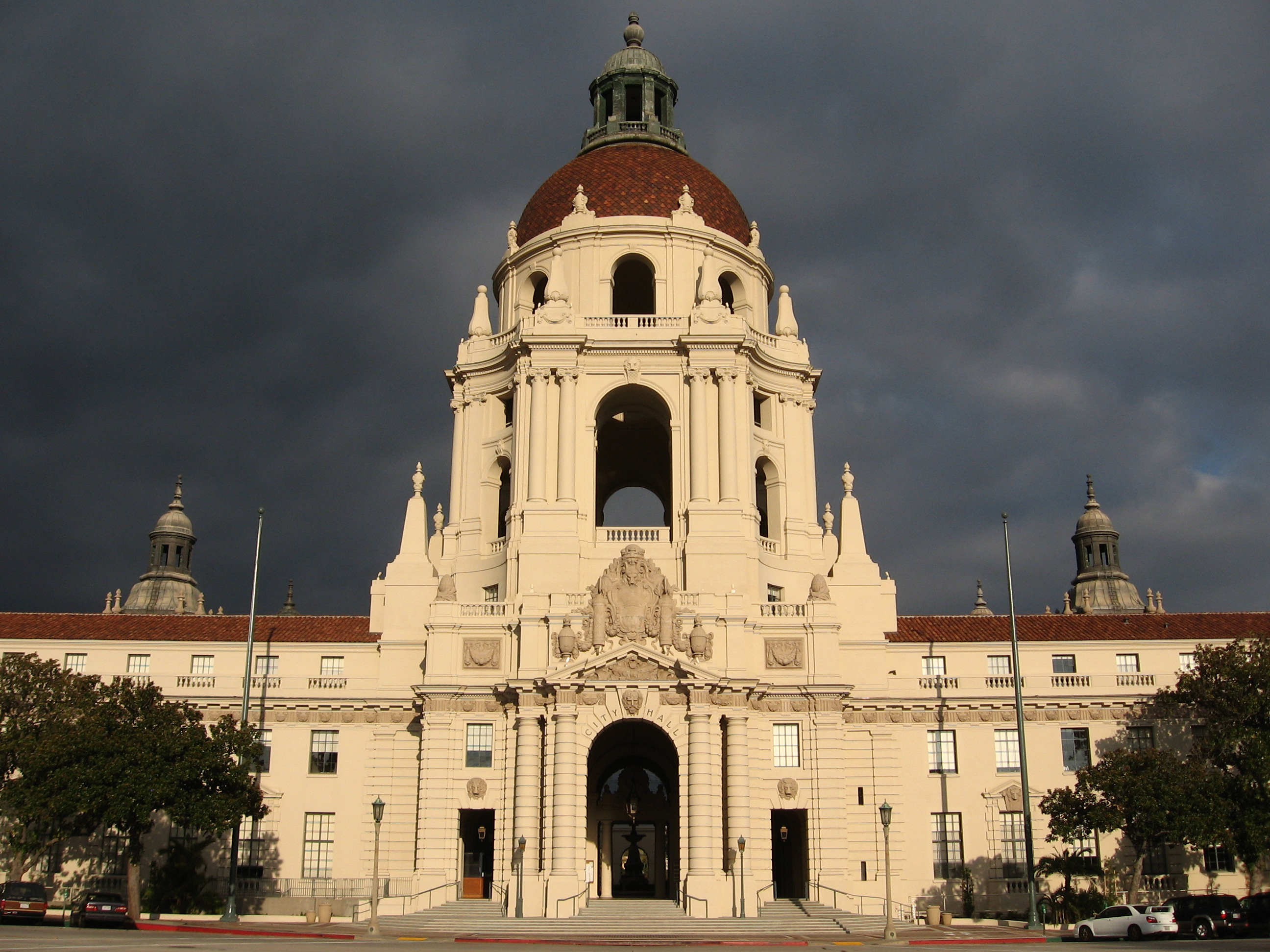
The exterior of the Pawnee government building, and several of the hallway scenes, were shot at Pasadena City Hall.

Principal photography began on February 18, 2009, less than two months before the show premiered. The show faced early production delays because Poehler was pregnant when she signed on, and filming had to be postponed until she gave birth. The show was filmed in Southern California. The exterior of the Pawnee government building, and several of the hallway scenes, were shot at Pasadena City Hall. The parks and recreation department interiors, as well as the City Hall courtyard, were filmed on a large studio set sound stage. The set's windows were outfitted with water systems to simulate falling rain, and the windowsills included fake pigeons. The set also includes four hallways that make up the hospital setting where Ann Perkins works as a nurse. The construction pit featured throughout the first and second seasons was dug by the episode's producers at an undeveloped property in Van Nuys, a district of Los Angeles. The producers went door-to-door in the neighborhood, seeking residents' permission for the dig. The pit was guarded 24 hours a day. Scenes set in playgrounds and elsewhere outdoors were filmed on location in Los Angeles. Most scenes set in locations outside the usual Parks and Recreation settings were also filmed in Los Angeles-area locations. For example, public forum scenes in the pilot episode were filmed in one of the city's middle schools, and a town meeting scene in the episode "Eagleton" was shot at the Toluca Lake Sports Center in the Toluca Lake district of Los Angeles. Other Eagleton scenes were also shot at the Huntington Library and Botanical Gardens, located in San Marino. Elaborate festival setting and corn maze sets featured in "Harvest Festival" was filmed at a real-life festival setting at Los Angeles Pierce College, a community college in the Woodland Hills neighborhood of Los Angeles. Schur said an aerial shot of the harvest festival at the end of the episode was the most expensive shot in the entire series.

Toward the end of production on the second season, Poehler became pregnant again and the producers of the show were forced to go into production on season three early and film an additional six episodes to accommodate not only Poehler's pregnancy, but also a projected September 2010 air date. After the episodes were already filmed, NBC opted not to put the show on the fall schedule and instead delayed the premiere of the third season until the beginning of 2011. This allowed for the network to run its new comedy, Outsourced, in two-hour comedy schedule block rather than Parks and Recreation. The schedule change meant that all sixteen episodes from the third season were filmed before any of them were shown; the rest of the episodes, starting with the seventh, were filmed in the fall of 2010. NBC chief executive officer Jeff Gaspin said this move was not a reflection on Parks and Recreation, and suggested the extended hiatus would not only have no negative effect on the show, but could actually build anticipation for its return. The move proved frustrating for the cast and crew of Parks and Recreation, although Poehler also pointed out it gave them additional time to go back and re-edit episodes or shoot and add new material.

=== Music ===
The producers hired BMI as music consultants to find a theme song. With less than three weeks until the show first aired, BMI sent out a mass e-mail to a slew of composers, giving them five days to submit an entry. According to the terms of the submission request, the only compensated composer would be the winner, who would receive $7,500 in exchange for the release of all rights to NBC. The winning entry was written by Gaby Moreno and Vincent Jones. Michael Schur said this theme song was chosen because producers wanted something that would immediately make the viewer associate the music with the series and the characters. He said Moreno and Jones' song "does a really good job of explaining what the town is like. (The) credits do a really good job of establishing it's just sort of a normal, every-day town in the middle of the country." Due to its realistic mockumentary-style cinematography technique, Parks and Recreation does not use composed background music.

Several songs were written for the show to be performed by Chris Pratt's character, Andy Dwyer, and his band within the show, Mouse Rat. Pratt sings and plays guitar in the band himself, while the drums are played by Mark Rivers, the guitar by Andrew Burlinson, and the bass guitar by Alan Yang, a screenwriter with the show. Rivers also wrote most of the music performed by Mouse Rat.

Pratt and the other band members played live during filming of the episode, rather than being pre-recorded and dubbed later. One song featured in "Rock Show", called "The Pit", chronicles Andy's experience falling into a construction pit and breaking his legs. Pratt wrote "Ann", a ballad about Ann Perkins, featured in the episode "Boys' Club". Schur wrote the lyrics to "November", a song featured in "The Master Plan" about April Ludgate. In the episode "Woman of the Year", Andy claims every song he writes includes either the lyrics, "Spread your wings and fly", or "You deserve to be a champion." As a result of that joke, every Mouse Rat song featured in the series since then has included one of those two lyrics. In the episode "Telethon", Andy plays the song "Sex Hair", about how one can tell whether someone has had sex because their hair is matted. In "Li'l Sebastian", Andy performs a tribute song called "5,000 Candles in the Wind", so-called because Leslie asks him to write a song like "Candle in the Wind" by Elton John, only 5,000 times better. The song was performed by the show's cast in the 2020 reunion special.

==== The Awesome Album ====
A Mouse Rat album, The Awesome Album, was released by Dualtone Records and Entertainment 720 (a fictional company within the show, created by Tom Haverford) on vinyl, CD, cassette, and digital download on August 27, 2021. The album was announced with the release of two singles: "The Pit" (from the season 1 finale, "Rock Show") and "Two Birds Holding Hands" (from the season 3 episode, "Andy and April's Fancy Party"). The album features guest vocals from Nick Offerman as Ron Swanson and Jeff Tweedy as Scott Tanner. Pratt stated on Rob Lowe's podcast Parks and Recollection that he was not involved with the project or its promotion. On the weekly Billboard charts, The Awesome Album debuted at number 2 on Comedy Albums, number 11 on Heatseekers Albums, and number 17 on Top Album Sales.

The Awesome Album
No.	Title	Artist	Length
1.	"5,000 Candles in the Wind (Bye, Bye Lil Sebastian)"
2.	"The Pit"
3.	"Sex Hair"
4.	"Catch Your Dream" (feat. Duke Silver)
5.	"Two Birds Holding Hands"
6.	"Ann Song"
7.	"The Way You Look Tonight"
8.	"Menace Ball"
9.	"Remember"
10.	"I Get A Kick Out Of You"
11.	"Lovely Tonight"
12.	"I've Got You Under My Skin"
13.	"I Only Have Eyes For You"
14.	"Pickled Ginger"	Land Ho!
15.	"Cold Water"	Scott Tanner feat. Duke Silver

== Broadcast ==
Parks and Recreation was broadcast in the 8:30 pm timeslot Thursdays on NBC, in the United States, during its first two seasons, as part of the network's Comedy Night Done Right line-up. It was moved to a 9:30 pm timeslot during its third season, where it premiered as a mid-season replacement. In September 2011, the show returned to its original 8:30 pm timeslot for the fourth season. In 2012, the fifth season moved back to 9:30 pm on Thursdays.

=== International ===
In Australia, Parks and Recreation aired on Channel Seven's digital channel, 7mate. In Canada, the series was simsubbed in most areas on City. In India, it airs on Zee Café. In the Philippines, it airs on Jack TV. In South Africa, the show airs on Pay-TV operator M-Net. In the UK, the show began airing on BBC Four in 2013. The first three seasons aired on this channel before moving to Dave in the summer of 2015, starting with season 4.

=== Syndication ===
In March 2011, Universal Media Studios announced its intentions to sell the syndication rights to Parks and Recreation. Comedy Central, FX, and Spike were all described as possible contenders to buy the syndication rights.

Syndicated episodes have aired on multiple cable networks including NBCUniversal owned Esquire Network (after relaunching from Style) and WGN America. The pilot episode also served as the first official broadcast of FX sister network, FXX, when it launched on September 2, 2013, followed by an all-day marathon, marking the first time the NBC comedy appeared off-network. The series debuted on Comedy Central in the United States on January 21, 2019, and select episodes were available to stream on their website and app. Comedy Central has the rights to air Parks and Recreation through 2024. In June 2020, the show also began airing on IFC in the United States, which they had the rights to until 2024.

=== Streaming ===
By 2018, Parks and Recreation was available for streaming on Hulu, Netflix, and Amazon Prime Video. Viewership on Hulu increased by 32% in 2017 over the previous year. According to Nielsen data, Parks and Recreation was one of the ten most-streamed shows on Netflix in 2018 based on time spent watching. Analytics from Jumpshot measured Parks and Recreation as the show with the third most views for 2018.

In September 2019, it was announced that Parks and Recreation would leave those services for Peacock, NBCUniversal's then-forthcoming streaming service, in October 2020. Variety reported the streaming deal was worth nine figures. A limited number of rotating episodes were also available through the Comedy Central app and website.

=== 2020 special episode ===
In April 2020, amidst the COVID-19 pandemic, NBC announced they would air a new, special episode of the series, centered on Leslie trying to stay connected with the other current and former residents of Pawnee during social distancing. The series' cast returned for the special, which benefited Feeding America's COVID-19 response. The special episode aired on April 30, 2020.

According to Schur, the special took about three weeks to complete. Morgan Sackett, who previously directed episodes of the series, was asked to direct, and many of the original writers on the series (including Megan Amram, Dave King, Joe Mande, Aisha Muharrar, Matt Murray, and Jen Statsky) created the script in three days. The cast members were sent camera rigs and iPhones to record their parts, taking four days to do so. The visual effects team from the series The Good Place (also created by Schur) provided visual effects on the special to help "make it look like not everyone was just sitting alone in their houses staring at their computers".

== Reception ==
=== Critical response ===
Critical response of Parks and Recreation
Season	Rotten Tomatoes	Metacritic
1	68% (37 reviews)	58 (25 reviews)
2	96% (23 reviews)	71 (7 reviews)
3	100% (23 reviews)	83 (7 reviews)
4	100% (20 reviews)	—N/a
5	96% (24 reviews)	—N/a
6	96% (23 reviews)	—N/a
7	89% (27 reviews)	—N/a
Special	100% (26 reviews)	89 (14 reviews)

The first season of Parks and Recreation started to receive criticism before the premiere episode aired. According to a March 18, 2009, report that was leaked to writer Nikki Finke, focus groups responded poorly to a rough-cut version of the pilot. Many focus group members felt the show was a "carbon copy" of The Office. Some found it predictable, slow-paced, and lacking in character development; others said the show lacked strong male characters, particularly a "datable" lead. Schur insisted the pilot had been completely re-edited at least four times since the focus groups described in the report were held. Nevertheless, the early feedback left many critics and industry observers skeptical about the show's chances of success.

After it aired, the first season received mixed-to-positive reviews; it holds a Metacritic score of 58 out of 100. Many critics said the series was too similar to The Office, and several commentators said Knope too closely resembled Michael Scott, the dimwitted protagonist of The Office. Some critics said the show's characters and overall tone were too mean-spirited in the early episodes, and although reviewers praised various cast members in individual episodes, some said the supporting characters in general needed to be more fully developed and provided with better material. The season finale "Rock Show" received far better reviews, with several commentators declaring that Parks and Recreation had finally found the right tone both generally and for the Leslie Knope character in particular.

The 2009–10 season of NBC's Parks and Recreation, which followed a lukewarm six-episode run in the spring of 2009, was probably the most impressive comeback in the history of broadcast comedy. In a single season, it went from a show that was widely shrugged off as the product of talented people in the wrong project to one that made many, many lists of the best shows of the year.

— Linda Holmes, NPR

Season two was better received and holds a Metacritic score of 71 out 100, indicating "generally favorable reviews". Several publications declared it among the best shows of 2009 including the Los Angeles Times, the Chicago Tribune, Time, Entertainment Weekly, GQ, New York magazine, The Star-Ledger, the San Francisco Chronicle, the Pittsburgh Post-Gazette, Paste magazine, IGN, and TV Squad. Several reviewers called the second season one of the most impressive comebacks in television history. Some reviewers said the supporting cast was now working with better material and that Amy Poehler's character had improved and become less over-the-top and more human than in the first season. Others praised the decision to drop subplots from season one that risked becoming stale, like Leslie's long-standing crush on Mark, as well as the decision to fill in the pit during the second season, which some commentators said freed the show up for more stories and better scripts.

Positive reception continued into the third season, which holds a Metacritic score of 83 out of 100, indicating "universal acclaim". Steve Heisler of The A.V. Club said although he considered Parks and Recreation the funniest sitcom on television during its second season, "it somehow got even better" during the third. Henry Hanks of CNN called it "a near-flawless season". In TIME magazine's 2012 year-end top 10 lists, Parks and Recreation was named the top TV series.

Parks and Recreation featured on the February 11, 2011, cover of Entertainment Weekly, which called it, "the smartest comedy on TV." The magazine included an article called "101 Reasons to Love Parks and Recreation."

Poehler said the first season struggled in part due to extremely high expectations from comparisons to The Office. After the first season ended, she said, "I think it was something we had to work through in the beginning, and I'm kind of hoping we're on the other side of that and people will start to judge the show on its own, for what it is and realize it's just a completely different world in a similar style." Likewise, Schur said he believed much of the early criticism stemmed from the fact audiences were not yet familiar with the characters, and he thought viewers who revisited the episodes would enjoy them more with a better understanding of the characters.

Poehler received wide praise for her performance from the beginning of the series; several reviewers, even those who did not enjoy the show, said her talent, timing and likability helped elevate the series above some of its flaws. Daniel Carlson of The Hollywood Reporter, who felt the season needed some time to mature, wrote that Poehler was its strongest element and that "she proves instantly she's got the comic intelligence to carry a series like this one".

Offerman received particularly strong praise for his minimalist and understated performance as Ron Swanson, whom many considered the show's breakout character. Steve Heisler of GQ magazine wrote that Offerman's role as Ron Swanson was a major part of the show's "creative resurgence". By the end of the second season, the character had taken on a cult status; Jonah Weiner of Slate magazine declared Swanson "Parks and Recreation's secret weapon".

Plaza's portrayal of April received critical praise, and April was considered a breakout character. The New York Times said that "all the characters were funny and well imagined, but Aubrey Plaza was particularly memorable as April". On the character's cultural impact, Vanity Fair regarded April as "an avatar for millennial jadedness and skepticism". The Daily Beast wrote that Plaza was "one of the greatest elements" of the series, and beyond comedic delivery she also brought "pathos" to the character.

Reviewers also consistently praised the performances by supporting actors Aziz Ansari as Tom Haverford and Chris Pratt as Andy Dwyer. Jonah Weiner of Slate said he did not enjoy the first season, but that "the brightest spot was Aziz Ansari as Leslie's subordinate Tom Haverford. In Ansari's hands, Tom came wickedly alive as a faux player". Scott Meslow of The Atlantic said Ansari "has somehow found a way to make Tom petulant, sexist, and materialistic without ever being unlikable". New York magazine writer Steve Kandell said, along with Ron Swanson, Andy Dwyer usually steals the episodes he appears in.

=== Cultural and political impact ===
In 2019, Parks and Recreation was ranked 54th on The Guardian's list of the 100 best TV shows of the 21st century. Vox and the Rolling Stone both named Parks and Recreation as the television show that "defined" the cultural zeitgeist of the Obama Presidency.

Alan Sepinwall wrote in Rolling Stone:

Few series in recent memory have been as clearly tied to a moment—and, specifically, a presidential administration—as Parks and Rec. The show's belief in the power of government to make people's lives better—and, more broadly, in the obligation members of a community (be they friends, family, or, as Ron Swanson once put it, "workplace proximity associates") have to help one another in times of need—made it the standard-bearer for the hopefulness of the Obama era.

The conservative political magazine National Review argued:

Even television shows that are legitimately funny, such as NBC's Parks and Recreation, are designed to flatter the sensibilities of those in charge. In Parks and Rec, self-proclaimed nerds and wonks have adopted liberal bureaucratic functionary and occasional elected official Leslie Knope (Amy Poehler) as one of their own. Her overeager chirpiness and her constant ability to one-up her hyper-libertarian boss mark her as a role model for those who believe that government is a force for good rather than a necessary evil.

U.S. News & World Report commented on the series finale:

Parks and Recreation never lost the Obama-like belief in government powered by goodwill and consensus. But the obstructionism of the Obama years made this vision seem fantastical, stoking a desire for hardheaded partisans who would get things done.

Time magazine's television critic James Poniewozik argued:

Parks became network TV's best and brightest sitcom by embodying the slogan that all politics is local....But there's a big idea in Parks' small-scale vision. In the frame of today's politics, it might be a liberal notion, but it's one that for much of the 20th century was centrist, and even championed by Republicans like park lover Teddy Roosevelt: that we need government to do things the private sector can't or won't, like preserving public spaces.... Parks argues not only that we need our neighbors' help but that helping makes us better ourselves; it's in the small-town, populist tradition of Friday Night Lights and It's a Wonderful Life.

=== Ratings ===
Viewership and ratings per season of Parks and Recreation
Season	Timeslot (ET)	Episodes	First aired		Last aired		TV season	Viewership rank	Avg. viewers (millions)
Season	Timeslot (ET)	Episodes	Date	Viewers (millions)	Date	Viewers (millions)	TV season	Viewership rank	Avg. viewers (millions)
1	Thursday 8:30 pm	6	April 9, 2009	6.88	May 14, 2009	4.29	2008–09	96	6.0
2	Thursday 8:30 pm	24	September 17, 2009	4.89	May 20, 2010	4.58	2009–10	108	4.6
3	Thursday 9:30 pm	16	January 20, 2011	6.14	May 19, 2011	3.72	2010–11	116	5.1
4	Thursday 8:30 pm (1–18); Thursday 9:30 pm (19–22)	22	September 22, 2011	4.11	May 10, 2012	3.42	2011–12	134	4.4
5	Thursday 9:30 pm (1–9); Thursday 8:30 pm (10–22)	22	September 20, 2012	3.50	May 2, 2013	2.99	2012–13	111	4.06
6	Thursday 8:00 pm (1–9); Thursday 8:30 pm (10–22)	22	September 26, 2013	3.27	April 24, 2014	2.71	2013–14	115	3.76
7	Tuesday 8:00 pm & 8:30 pm (Note: All of season 7 (with the exception of one week) was aired in a double episode format - with two episodes airing back-to-back.)	13	January 13, 2015	3.75	February 24, 2015	4.15	2014–15	119	4.57

I would love it if our ratings went up and up, and we've done a pretty good job of making our show inviting and friendly, welcoming to new viewers. Other than that, I'm not sure what else we can do. It's very disconcerting.

— Michael Schur

Parks and Recreation struggled in the Nielsen ratings throughout its entire run on NBC. The series premiere was seen by 6.88 million viewers, which media outlets described as a strong opening, comparable to the average Nielsen ratings for 30 Rock, another Thursday-night show on NBC. Viewership declined every week over the rest of the season, culminating in a season low of 4.29 million viewers for the final episode. Parks and Recreation ended the first season with an overall average rating of 5.97 million viewers, ranking 94th in a list of 193 network shows for the 2008–09 television season. Low viewership presented a greater challenge for Parks and Recreation because NBC now trailed CBS, ABC, and Fox in the ratings, and the move of comedian Jay Leno from The Tonight Show to a variety show in NBC's 10:00 pm weeknight slot left less room on the network's primetime schedule. At the end of the season, members of the cast and crew were stressed because they did not know whether the show would be renewed.

Although Parks and Recreation achieved critical success during the second season, the show continued to suffer in the ratings. By December 2009, the average episode viewership was 5.3 million viewers, which was lower than the average ratings for other Thursday-night NBC comedy shows like Community's 6.5 million viewers, 30 Rock's 7.3 million, and The Office's 10.1 million. For the overall second season, Parks and Recreation had an overall average viewership of 4.6 million viewers, making it the 108th ranked network series for the 2009–10 season. The poor ratings continued into the third season, which ended with an overall average rating of 5.1 million viewers, the 116th ranked network series of the 2010–11 television season. Michael Schur partially attributed the continually low viewership to a decline in ratings for NBC in general, as well as changing viewer trends due to a large number of available channels.

Despite the generally low ratings, Parks and Recreation was renewed for a sixth season on May 9, 2013. NBC had a financial incentive to continue the series, as it owns the distribution rights via its NBCUniversal Television Distribution company: the sixth season put the series over the 100 episodes milestone, making it more viable for syndication.

=== Accolades ===
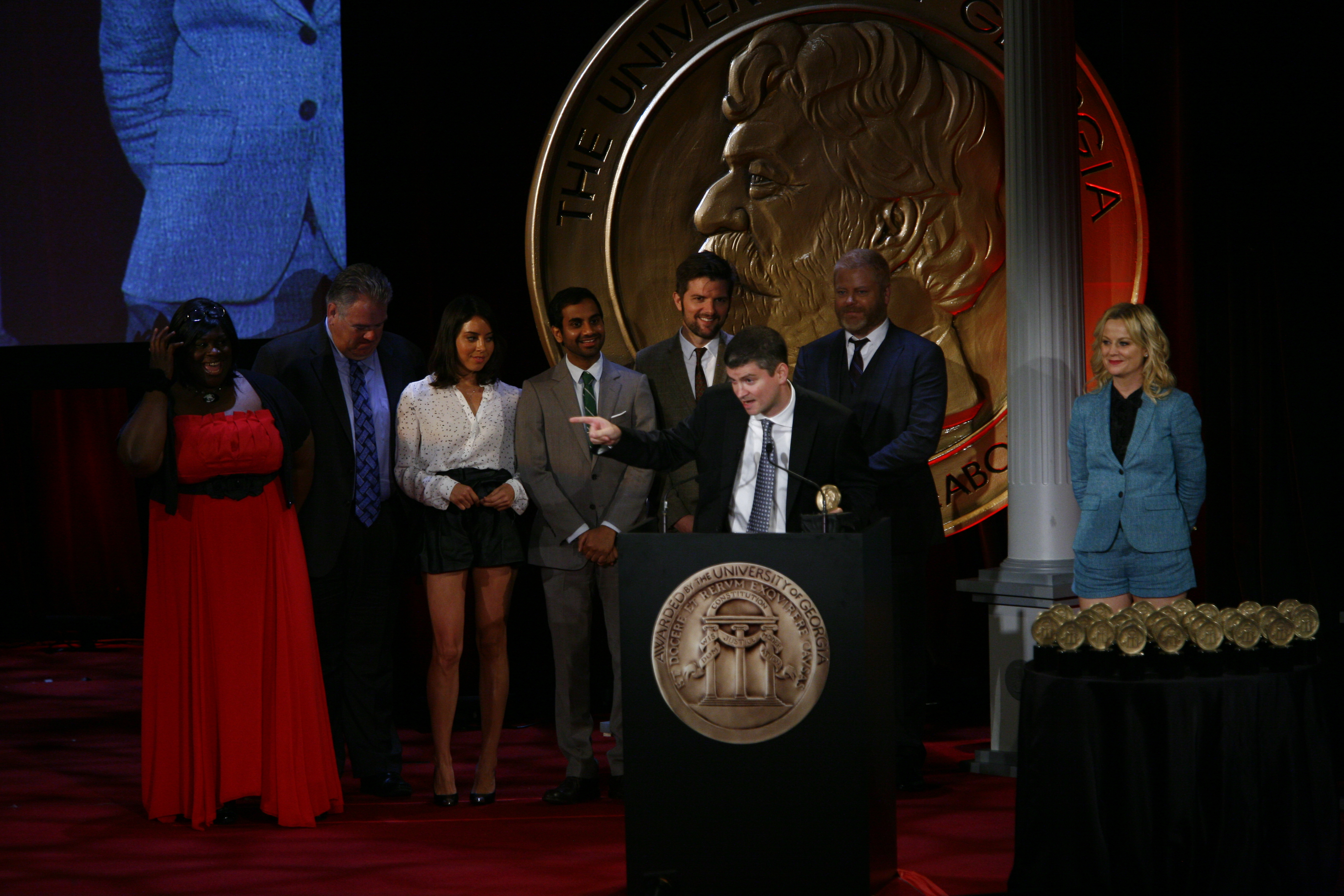
Mike Schur accepts the Peabody for Parks and Recreation. He is joined on stage by Retta, Jim O'Heir, Aubrey Plaza, Aziz Ansari, Adam Scott, Nick Offerman and Amy Poehler at the 71st Annual Peabody Awards.

In 2010, Amy Poehler was nominated for a Primetime Emmy Award for Outstanding Lead Actress in a Comedy Series for her work in the second season. Also that year, Parks and Recreation was nominated for the Television Critics Association Award for Outstanding Achievement in Comedy and Individual Achievement in Comedy for Nick Offerman for his work in the second season. The second-season premiere episode, "Pawnee Zoo", won the GLAAD Media Award for Outstanding Individual Episode (in a Series without a Regular LGBT Character). Also in 2010, Parks and Recreation received two nominations from Entertainment Weekly's EWwy Awards: Best Comedy Series and Best Supporting Actor in a Comedy Series for Offerman.

In 2011, Parks and Recreation was nominated for the Primetime Emmy Award for Outstanding Comedy Series and Amy Poehler received her second Emmy nomination for Outstanding Lead Actress in a Comedy Series. In June 2011, Parks and Recreation was nominated for three awards for the inaugural Critics' Choice Television Awards: Best Comedy Series, Best Lead Actress in a Comedy Series for Poehler, and Best Supporting Actor in a Comedy Series for Nick Offerman. Also that month, Parks and Recreation was nominated for four TCA Awards: Program of the Year, Outstanding Achievement in Comedy, and Individual Achievement in Comedy for Offerman and Poehler. Offerman hosted the TCA Awards ceremony that year. In 2012, the series received a Peabody Award. In January 2014, Poehler won her first Golden Globe Award for Best Actress in a Television Series Comedy.

== Home media ==
The first season of Parks and Recreation was released on DVD in region 1 on September 8, 2009. The DVD included all six episodes, as well as an "Extended Producer's Cut" of the season finale, "Rock Show". The disc also included cast and crew commentary tracks for each episode, as well as about 30 minutes of deleted scenes. The second season was released in a four-disc set in region 1 on November 30, 2010. They included extended episodes for "The Master Plan" and "Freddy Spaghetti", as well as two-and-a-half hours of deleted scenes, a third season preview, and additional video clips. Audio commentaries were recorded for the episodes "Sister City", "Ron and Tammy", "Hunting Trip", "Woman of the Year", "The Master Plan" and "Freddy Spaghetti". The Blu-ray version of the complete series was released from Universal Pictures Home Entertainment on June 15, 2021.

== Potential revival ==
In March 2019, during the tenth anniversary reunion at PaleyFest, the cast confirmed they would return for a revival of the series, if series creator Michael Schur "came up with an original, new idea". Schur stated, "I would never ever say never. The chance to do it again, should it arise, would be incredible, but we would only do it if we all felt like there was something compelling us to do it. If one single person said no, we wouldn't do it."

=== Special ===
In April 2020, the cast reprised their roles for a special episode that was created during the COVID-19 pandemic. It first aired on NBC and raised funds for Feeding America.
