= Seth Gordon =

American film director, producer, screenwriter, and film editor (born 1976)

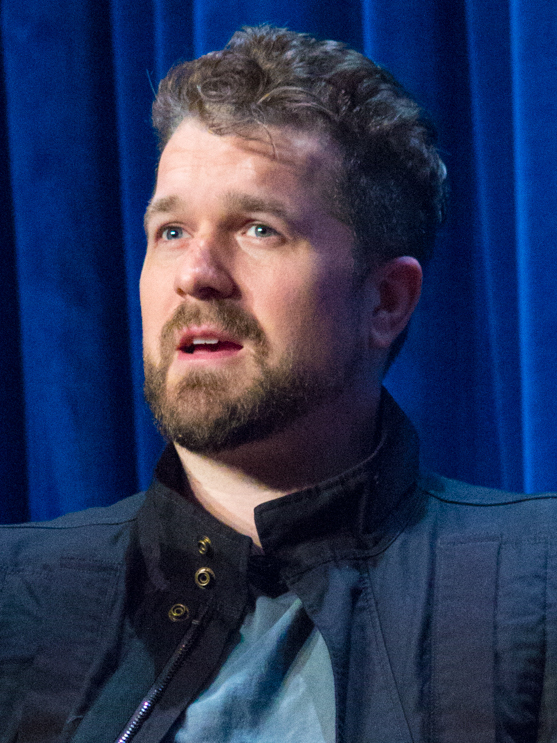
- Gordon in 2014
- Born: 1976 (age 49–50); Evanston, Illinois, U.S.
- Occupations: Film director, producer, screenwriter, editor
- Notable work: The King of Kong (2007); Horrible Bosses (2011); Identity Thief (2013)

Seth Lewis Gordon (born 1976) is an American film director, producer, screenwriter, and film editor.

He has produced and directed for film and television, including for PBS, the Bill & Melinda Gates Foundation, and the United Nations Staff 1% for Development Fund. His films have screened at the Sundance Film Festival and Slamdance Film Festival.

He has directed the films The King of Kong: A Fistful of Quarters (2007), Four Christmases (2008), Horrible Bosses (2011), Identity Thief (2013), and Baywatch (2017). He has also directed several episodes of television series like The Office, Parks and Recreation, Modern Family, Atypical, and For All Mankind.

== Life and career ==
Born in 1976, Gordon grew up in Evanston, Illinois. He attended Yale University class of 1998, where he studied architecture until leaving in 1997 to teach high school for six months in the small village of Shimanyiro, Kenya. While there he helped secure United Nations financing to finish construction of a school, and began filming what would eventually become the documentary Building Shimanyiro. Upon returning to Yale, Gordon taught himself how to edit his footage on an Avid editing machine. Later, he helped shoot Barbara Kopple and Cecilia Peck's Dixie Chicks documentary Shut Up & Sing, and after working as cinematographer, editor and producer on various films, he gained prominence with his documentary The King of Kong: A Fistful of Quarters.

Gordon directed the game company Zynga's "GagaVille" online film in 2010. He co-created and is an executive producer of the Fox television series Breaking In. He directed the 2011 comedy Horrible Bosses, but in August 2013 declined to direct the sequel, citing commitments to the television series The Goldbergs, on which he is an executive producer, and a planned remake of the film WarGames. Gordon directed the pilot of Sneaky Pete for Amazon Studios, which he also produced with Bryan Cranston and David Shore.

Gordon directed the 2017 film version of Baywatch, starring Dwayne Johnson, Priyanka Chopra and Zac Efron.

He graduated from Lakeside School (Seattle) in 1994 and the Harvard Graduate School of Design.

In 2009, Gordon developed and directed a video series focusing on the threat posed by cybercrime to Internet users, H*Commerce: The Business of Hacking You, sponsored by antivirus software company McAfee. Gordon has directed various music videos and commercials, and an episode each of Modern Family and Community, two episodes of The Office, and several episodes of Parks and Recreation. He was a director and executive producer on NBC's Marry Me. Gordon is a director and executive producer on ABC's The Goldbergs. He also serves as a director and executive producer on the Netflix series Atypical.

== Filmography ==
=== Film ===
Director

- Four Christmases (2008)
- Horrible Bosses (2011)
- Identity Thief (2013)
- Baywatch (2017)
- Back in Action (2025) (Also writer and producer)

Acting credits

Year	Title	Role
2011	Horrible Bosses	Ralph Peterberg (voice role)
2017	Baywatch	Helicopter pilot

Other credits

Year	Title	Role
2005	Cry Wolf	Editor, associate producer, and second unit director
2015	Pixels	Executive producer
2022	The Lost City	Story writer and producer

=== Documentary film ===
Year	Title	Director	Producer	Writer
2005	New York Doll	No	Yes	No
2007	The King of Kong	Yes	No	No
2010	Freakonomics	Yes	Executive	Yes
2010	Make Believe	No	Executive	No
2011	Undefeated	No	Yes	No
2014	Mitt	No	Executive	No
2014	Print the Legend	No	Yes	No
2015	Finders Keepers	No	Yes	No
2015	Dark Web	No	Executive	No
2016	Gleason	No	Yes	No
2017	Bill Nye: Science Guy	No	Yes	No
2017	Served Like a Girl	No	Yes	No
2018	Wrestle	No	Yes	No
2020	Zappa	No	Executive	No
2023	Finding Home: Journey to MLB	No	Executive	No

=== Television ===
Year	Title	Director	Executive producer	Writer	Notes
2009	Community	Yes	No	No	Episode "Environmental Science"
2009–2010	The Office	Yes	No	No	Episodes "Double Date" and "The Delivery" (part 1)
2009–2010	Parks and Recreation	Yes	No	No	Episodes "Canvassing" and "The Stakeout"
2010	Modern Family	Yes	No	No	Episode "Travels with Scout"
2011	Breaking In	Yes	Yes	Yes	Also creator; Directed 5 episodes
2013–2017	The Goldbergs	Yes	Yes	No	7 episodes
2014–2015	Marry Me	Yes	Yes	No	3 episodes
2015	Sneaky Pete	Yes	Yes	No	Episode "Pilot"
2015	The Jim Gaffigan Show	Yes	Yes	No	Episode "Pilot"
2017	Atypical	Yes	Yes	No	Episodes "Antarctica" and "A Nice Neutral Smell"
2017	The Good Doctor	Yes	Yes	No	Episodes "Burnt Food" and "She"
2019	For All Mankind	Yes	Yes	No	Episodes "Red Moon" and "He Built the Saturn V"
2020	Lincoln Rhyme: Hunt for the Bone Collector	Yes	Yes	No	Episode "Pilot"
2020	United We Fall	No	Yes	No	
2022	The Long Game: Bigger Than Basketball	Yes	Yes	No	Directed 5 episodes
2023	The Night Agent	Yes	Yes	No	2 episodes
