= The Stakeout (Parks and Recreation) =

- Parks and Recreation episode
- Episode no.: Season 2 Episode 2
- Directed by: Seth Gordon
- Written by: Rachel Axler
- Original air date: September 24, 2009

Guest appearances
- Louis C.K. as Dave Sanderson; Frank Crim as Janitor; John Deignan as Tow Truck Driver; Jim O'Heir as Jerry Gergich; Retta as Donna Meagle

Episode chronology
| ← Previous "Pawnee Zoo" | Next → "Beauty Pageant" |
- Parks and Recreation season 2

"The Stakeout" is the second episode of the second season of the American comedy television series Parks and Recreation, and the eighth overall episode of the series. It originally aired on NBC in the United States on September 24, 2009. In the episode, Leslie conducts surveillance on a community garden in an attempt to find out who planted marijuana there.

The episode was written by Rachel Axler and directed by Seth Gordon. It marked the first in a series of guest appearances by stand-up comedian Louis C.K. as Dave Sanderson, a Pawnee police officer who develops a romantic interest in Leslie. A scene in which Sanderson arrests Tom Haverford in his own van mirrors the real-life controversial 2009 arrest of Henry Louis Gates.

According to Nielsen Media Research, the episode was seen by 4.22 million households, an 800,000-household drop from the previous week's season premiere, "Pawnee Zoo". "The Stakeout" received generally positive reviews, with several commentators saying it marked a continued improvement over the first Parks and Recreation season.

== Plot ==
Ann, who is preparing for her first date with Mark, worriedly asks Leslie if she has any reservations, since Leslie previously had feelings for him. Leslie insists she is fine. Later, Leslie and Tom visit a community garden in the Pawnee pit, where they find what appears to be marijuana.

That night, Leslie and Tom stakeout the pit from a van to catch the culprit growing the marijuana. Leslie eventually spots Ann and Mark leaving for their date and starts snapping photos of them. Later, Leslie and Tom see Ann's ex-boyfriend Andy in the pit. They assume he is the kingpin, but he insists he is actually living in the pit and eating the vegetables from the garden, expressing shock that there was marijuana being grown.

Back at city hall, Ron remains immobile in his chair all day due to a hernia which causes excruciating pain if he moves. Ron remains immobile in his seat well into the night, until the automatic lights shut off on him. The intern, April, returns to check on him, and wheels Ron out to the car on his office chair to bring him to the hospital.

Leslie and Andy walk off to get fast food. Back at the pit, Tom is locked out of his van and tries to break back in. Ann and Mark return from their date and call the police after they see him, assuming him to be a prowler. Officer Dave Sanderson arrives and confronts Tom, who mouths off at Dave until he places him under arrest.

Leslie goes to the police station. Initially angry, she eventually confesses about the marijuana. Dave releases Tom, who thanks Leslie for sticking up for him. The next day, Leslie and Dave go to the garden, but he finds no marijuana. Tom tells Leslie that Mark is an idiot, and that she can do better. Dave guesses Leslie orchestrated the whole thing to spy on Ann and Mark. Later, Dave privately admits he is attracted to Leslie.

== Production ==
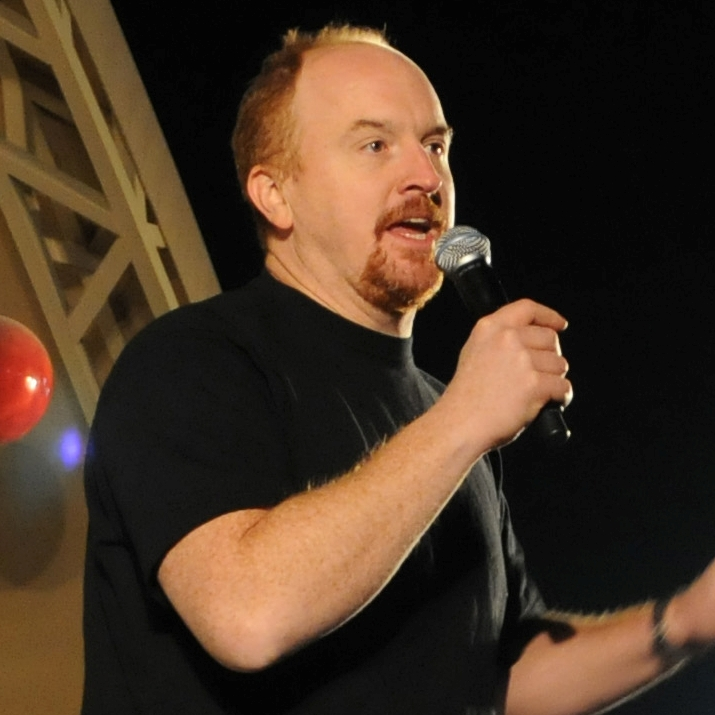
Louis C.K. first appears in this episode as a recurring character Officer Dave Sanderson.

"The Stakeout" was written by Rachel Axler and directed by Seth Gordon. It marked the first in a series of guest appearances by stand-up comedian Louis C.K. He played Dave Sanderson, a Pawnee police officer who develops a romantic interest in Leslie, and speaks about intimate feelings in a deadpan, technical tone of voice. C.K. improvised the line, "I was attracted to her in a sexual manner that was appropriate" during his discussion about Leslie near the end of the episode.

During a scene in the van, Tom Haverford tells Leslie he changed his name because his original name was too foreign-sounding for a career in politics. When Leslie points about U.S. President Barack Obama has a foreign-sounding name, Tom gets upset. The reference to Obama's name was originally featured in a scene that was cut from the Parks and Recreation pilot episode. Offerman, who barely moves and is often quiet throughout the episode, said he learned to use humor amid silence while serving as an altar boy and lector at his church. Offerman said, "I had a cousin in the congregation, and I would speak with the utmost, august stoicism, and everyone would think I was a very effective speaker. But he knew I was being facetious. He'd get in trouble for cracking up."

Within a week of the episode's original broadcast, three deleted scenes from "The Stakeout" were made available on the official Parks and Recreation website. In the first 75-second clip, a panicked Leslie asks Tom whether the marijuana plant could be a "non-marijuana weed". In the second 80-second clip, Dave says he hates arresting people because he "never wants to go". He also discusses his strategies for calming people down, including using a soft voice, eye contact and tasing them. In the third minute-long clip, Ron tries unsuccessfully to eat his lunch and throw away the garbage without moving.

== Cultural references ==
Tom's arrest in "The Stakeout" was inspired by the controversial real-life 2009 arrest of Henry Louis Gates (pictured).

The confrontation between Tom Haverford and Dave Sanderson before Tom's arrest in his own van mirrored the real life arrest of Henry Louis Gates, a black Harvard University professor who was arrested after police mistakenly thought he was breaking into his own home in Cambridge, Massachusetts. The arrest received national attention. When a police officer asked Gates to step outside, he replied, "I'll speak to your mama outside," which was parodied in "The Stakeout" when Dave asked Tom to step out of the van and he responded, "I'll step out of your mama's van!"

During the opening scene, Tom pretends to know the names of all the plants in a community garden and assigns them all fake names based on real-life rappers. He refers to one plant as Souljaboy Tellems, a reference to the performer Soulja Boy Tell 'Em, and another as Ludacrises, a reference to rapper Ludacris.

== Reception ==
In its original American broadcast on September 24, 2009, "The Stakeout" was seen by 4.22 million households, according to Nielsen Media Research. It constituted a nearly 800,000-household drop from the previous week's season premiere, "Pawnee Zoo". The episode received a 1.8 rating/5 share among viewers aged between 18 and 49, the lowest rating for Season Two so far. The Star-Ledger television columnist Alan Sepinwall said although the quality of Parks and Recreations was improving, season two was struggling in the ratings based on the lower quality of the season one episodes. Sepinwall said, "There's a school of thought in the TV business that it's harder to get back viewers who watched and left than it is to start small and attract new viewers over time." "The Stakeout" received generally positive reviews. Sepinwall said the episode was funny, but also notable because it developed a stronger personal connection between Leslie and Tom, and because it featured more references to topical events like the Henry Gates controversy.

In two short episodes, we’re already seeing a new push toward topical stories and jokes, more fleshed-out relationships among the supporting characters, and — most importantly — a Leslie Knope that isn’t completely unbelievable.

— Henning Fog,
Entertainment Weekly

Steve Heisler of The A.V. Club said "The Stakeout" was "the best Parks & Recreation episode by a long shot". He said Poehler seemed more at ease with the Leslie character, and thought "the intersection of business and personal stress" served the episode well. He also praised the supporting cast and particularly the Ron Swanson subplot. Matt Fowler of IGN said with "The Stakeout", the second season of Parks and Recreation continued to be "significantly funnier" than the first season. Fowler said he thought the pairing between Leslie and Tom helped ground both characters, and said he was interested to see Leslie dealt with the growing romance between Ann and Mark. Entertainment Weekly writer Henning Fog said "The Stakeout" showed growth improvement for the series, and praised the guest performance of Louis C.K. Fog said the disparate pairing of Leslie and Tom, Mark and Ann, and Ron and April, created a sense that the characters "really knew each other [and] had lives outside of Leslie's immediate orbit". Chicago Tribune columnist Maureen Ryan particularly praised the performance of Offerman, of whom she said, "His pained reactions and stoic silence are hilarious."

== DVD release ==
"The Stakeout", along with the other 23 second season episodes of Parks and Recreation, was released on a four-disc DVD set in the United States on November 30, 2010. The DVD included deleted scenes for each episode.
