= H*Commerce =

Film by Seth Gordon

H*Commerce: The Business of Hacking You
- Directed by: Seth Gordon
- Produced by: Moxie Pictures
- Distributed by: McAfee
- Release date: May 20, 2009
- Country: United States
- Language: English

H*Commerce: The Business of Hacking You is a six-part online documentary film series directed by Seth Gordon. It centers on the struggle between criminal hackers and security experts. Each segment is between five and eight minutes in length. The first was released on the Internet on May 20, 2009.

"H*Commerce" stands for "hacker commerce", specifically "the business of making money through the illegal use of technology to compromise personal and business data," according to McAfee.

== Synopsis ==
The main narrative follows the story of Sweet Home, Oregon resident Janella Spears, who falls victim to an elaborate Nigerian 419 scam. Initiated by e-mail, the scammers promise Spears and her family the return of a dead relative's lost fortune. Interested in her family's genealogy and persuaded by a death certificate purported to be her relative's, Spears eventually loses US$440,000.

The series also features Denver, Colorado-based computer forensics expert Chris Roberts, who provides both counseling and technical support to the Spears family as they deal with the emotional challenges brought about by their mounting debt, as well as the resultant anger and distrust.

Roberts also demonstrates how an open wireless network can provide a criminal with the data necessary to commit identity fraud, among other Internet crimes, and how he can surreptitiously access Bluetooth-enabled devices in surrounding cars on a crowded freeway.

== Themes ==
The series focuses on the growing threat of cybercrime and explores the evolution of computer hacking from phone phreaking to a multibillion-dollar criminal industry that targets individuals with tools such as botnets and DDOS attacks. The series also explores other hacking-related topics such as malware, site scraping and spear phishing. It also focuses on online safety education and safe shopping.

Apple cofounder Steve Wozniak makes an appearance as well to talk about his phone phreaking days, as does phreaking pioneer John "Captain Crunch" Draper. In the film, Wozniak explains that hackers and phreakers originally maintained a strong ethic, using their techniques not to "rip people off or make money" but "to explore". Draper observes that the imprisonment of hackers had unintended side-effects: "Once I got busted, I had to tell everybody else in jail how to do it and then the cat's out of the bag. The next thing you know, the mob has this technology."

According to McAfee, Americans lost a total of almost $8.5 billion due to Internet-enabled crimes between 2007 and 2008.

== Production ==
H*Commerce was produced by antivirus software maker McAfee as part of a campaign to educate consumers about online security threats. Gordon, best known for Four Christmases and The King of Kong: A Fistful of Quarters, was hired to direct. The series was shot in HD.

The project was originally conceived as a series of standalone episodes, with each highlighting a different aspect of online crimes, including phishing, bank scraping, and e-mail scams. However, during pre-production research, Gordon identified Spears as an example of how typical Internet users are vulnerable to criminals, and decided to make her the focus of the entire series.

Millam stated:

We produced the Web-based film to make cybercrime real for people, and to help consumers understand why they need to take precautions. The days when hackers were a small group of thrill-seekers breaking into computers to gain fame and notoriety are behind us. Now, hacking for profit, or what we call H*Commerce, is a global industry.

== Distribution and marketing ==
Promotion for the film, and the site on which it appears, was conducted primarily online through banner ads and trailers as well as a social media and mobile campaign. In New York and San Francisco, McAfee conducted a poster campaign featuring artwork similar to those created by Saul Bass for Alfred Hitchcock by San Francisco Graphic Designer, Nicole Flores.

The film's website also offers additional resources to learn about cybercrime and online safety, as well as a McAfee's Cybercrime Response Unit, a free service for consumers who believe they have been the victim of a cybercrime.
