= Jim Davenport (journalist) =

American journalist

James Raymond Davenport III
- Born: 1958; Great Falls, Montana
- Died: December 31, 2012 (age 54); Columbia, South Carolina
- Education: B.A., M.A., University of South Carolina
- Occupation: Journalist
- Employer: The Associated Press
- Spouse: Debra Davenport
- Children: One daughter
- Awards: Order of the Palmetto, 2012

James Raymond Davenport III (1958 – December 31, 2012), born in Great Falls, Montana, was an American journalist and reporter with the Associated Press, based in South Carolina. Davenport graduated from the University of South Carolina, with a bachelor's and a master's degree in English and journalism.

Davenport worked for the Associated Press for more than 12 years, keeping the citizens of South Carolina informed on the work of their state representatives and special interest groups who tried to exert influence on them.

== Career ==
After graduation, Davenport began working at The State, eventually leaving in 1999, to work for The Associated Press. He worked for AP for more than 12 years, focusing on keeping the citizens of South Carolina informed and holding their state representatives accountable.

=== Reporting on the Confederate flag ===
On July 1, 2000, Davenport wrote about the Confederate flag being removed from the capitol dome, in South Carolina. He referred to the flag as being a tribute to Southern heritage for some, and for others a symbol of slavery. He was there for the ceremony, noting how as the flag came down from the dome, another, smaller flag, was raised in front of the Confederate soldier's monument on Statehouse grounds.

In March, 2001, he wrote about the dedication of a new monument to African American history. In the article, titled, A Slave Memorial Now Stands Amid State's Tributes to Confederacy, he wrote:

"The semicircular arms of gray granite reach out to embrace a depiction of a slave ship's crammed cargo hold and a map of Africa...Benches along the walls invite people to sit and think and maybe look at the Confederate flag. Now down from atop the Statehouse, it still flies at the nearby Confederate Soldiers' Monument."

Finally, on February 1, 2005, Davenport reported on the death of a man who called himself, Rev. E. Slave, who had been an advocate of the removal of the Confederate flag from the Statehouse dome, saying once, "that flag depresses me...it makes me think I'm going back into slavery."

=== Reporting on Mark Sanford ===
In 2009, Davenport was the first reporter to break the story that then-Governor Mark Sanford had been out of state for several days, uncovering a sex scandal. Davenport reported that Sanford had used South Carolinian government-owned planes for personal trips and had used taxpayer funds for upgrades to first-class seating on flights. A selection of the articles that Davenport wrote are listed below.

- Where's Sanford? S.C. first lady, staff won't discuss his whereabouts, June 22, 2009.
- Wife, sons of South Carolina Gov. Mark Sanford move out of official residence, August 7, 2009.
- South Carolina's Mark Sanford fails to list 35 flights, August 22, 2009.
- S.C. Gov. Sanford to face ethics charges over affair, November 19, 2009.
- Decision looms on Stanford's impeachment, December 8, 2009.
- Jenny Sanford files for divorce, December 11, 2009.

Sanford had to pay a $74,000 fine for ethics violation, which is the largest ethics penalty charged in South Carolina state history.

== Awards and recognition ==
On October 26, 2012, South Carolina Governor Nikki Haley presented Davenport with the Order of the Palmetto, the state's highest civilian honor, at a ceremony held at his home in Columbia, South Carolina.

Other awards include:

- 2009 Associated Press Staffer of the Year for South Carolina
- 2011 Associated Press "Best of States" Award
- The South Carolina Press Association Freedom of Information Award

In 2012, the South Carolina General Assembly passed a Senate Resolution in recognition of his distinguished service to the citizens of South Carolina.

== Personal ==
Davenport died on December 31, 2012, at the age of 54 after a two-year battle with cancer. He is survived by his wife, Debra, and one daughter.
