= Mark Sanford extramarital affair =

2009 US political sex scandal

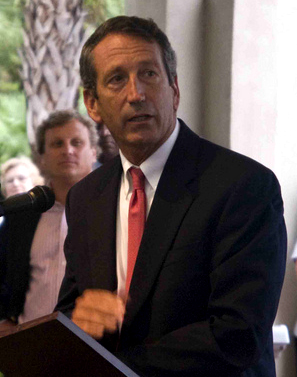
Mark Sanford was the Republican governor of South Carolina from 2003 to 2011.

The Mark Sanford extramarital affair was a political sex scandal in the United States. From June 18 until June 24, 2009, Republican South Carolina Governor Mark Sanford's whereabouts were unknown and the media covered what was described as his disappearance. Subsequently, Sanford reappeared and admitted that he had been in Buenos Aires, Argentina, with a woman with whom he was having an extramarital affair. He stated that in 2001, he met and became friends with this woman and that they started having a sexual relationship in 2008. His wife, Jenny Sanford, became aware of the relationship in January 2009, and it was later revealed that two weeks prior to June 24, Sanford and his wife had begun a trial separation. The woman was later identified as Maria Belén Chapur, an Argentine journalist.

During the six days of absence, one of the excuses offered by Sanford's spokesperson was that Sanford was hiking the Appalachian Trail. As a result, "hiking the Appalachian Trail" or "hiking the Appalachians" became a euphemism for a sexual scandal in American English.

== Early history ==
The early history of the relationship between Chapur and Sanford was not publicly known until 2009. In 2001, Chapur and Sanford met at an open-air dance in Uruguay. The couple met again at a New York bistro in 2004. Later there were two other meetings in New York, one with Sanford accompanied by a spiritual adviser with the knowledge of his wife. According to reports from Sanford, the two first had sex in 2008 during an economic development trip Sanford made to Argentina.

== Disappearance ==
From June 18 until June 24, 2009, Sanford's whereabouts were unknown to the public, including his wife and his security staff. His absence was first reported by Jim Davenport of the Associated Press. This six day disappearance garnered nationwide news coverage. His state and personal phones were turned off and he did not respond to phone or text messages. That prompted some to believe that he was missing and raised questions about who was acting as governor of South Carolina. His wife, Jenny Sanford, initially stated that she was not concerned and that he needed time away from their children to write something. Sanford had apparently made similar disappearances in the past, although this was the longest. After media speculation grew, Sanford's office on June 22 stated that he told them where he was going before he left and that he would be "difficult to reach". Later that day, Sanford's spokesman, Joel Sawyer, told the press that Sanford was hiking the Appalachian Trail.

Some South Carolina politicians voiced concerns about the governor's behavior. Lieutenant Governor André Bauer announced that he could not "take lightly that his staff has not had communication with him for more than four days, and that no one, including his own family, knows his whereabouts." The Senate Minority Leader, Democrat John Land, also questioned the fact that Sanford was absent over the Father's Day weekend, arguing that "it's one thing for the boys to go off by themselves, but on Father's Day to leave your family behind? That's erratic."

On June 23, Sawyer reported that Sanford had contacted his staff that morning, after apparently being out of touch with them for five days, and expressed surprise at all of the attention to his absence. Sawyer announced that the governor had decided to return to work the next day.

== Extramarital affair disclosed ==
On June 24, Sanford arrived at Hartsfield–Jackson Atlanta International Airport, at 5:43 am on Delta Air Lines Flight 110 from Buenos Aires, Argentina. He was met at the airport by only one reporter, The State's Gina Smith, who had received a tip that the governor was in Argentina and, on a "hunch", went to the Atlanta Airport to meet a flight arriving from Argentina. He gave her a brief sit-down interview, in which he claimed that he was alone for the entire trip, and did not give any details other than that he drove the coastline. Sanford said that he had considered hiking the Appalachian Trail, but at the last minute decided to do something "exotic". Sanford had redeemed an award ticket on Delta Air Lines Skymiles frequent flyer program.

When asked why his staff said he was hiking, Sanford replied, "I don't know." He later said "in fairness to his staff," he had told them he might go hiking. Sanford said he cut his trip short after his chief of staff, Scott English, told him his trip was gaining a lot of media attention and he needed to return. These events prompted Republican state senator Jake Knotts to comment, "Lies. Lies. Lies. That's all we get from his staff. That's all we get from his people. That's all we get from him."

Several hours after arriving back in the United States, Sanford held a press conference, in which he admitted that he had been unfaithful to his wife. He told reporters that he had developed a relationship with an Argentine woman whom he had met "a little over eight years ago, very innocently," and that the relationship had turned romantic about a year before. Jenny Sanford had been made aware of his infidelities in January 2009 after discovering a letter that Sanford had written to an Argentine woman.

In emotional interviews with the Associated Press over two days, Sanford said he would die "knowing that I had met my soulmate." Sanford acknowledged secretly meeting Chapur five times in 2009, including two multi-night stays, one in New York City and one in the Hamptons, paying expenses in cash to avoid detection. Sanford also said that he "crossed the lines" with a handful of other women during 20 years of marriage, but not as far as he did with his mistress. "There were a handful of instances wherein I crossed the lines I shouldn't have crossed as a married man, but never crossed the ultimate line," he said.

Sanford and his wife had sought marriage counseling. She said that she requested a trial separation about two weeks before his disappearance. Governor Sanford also told reporters that months before his affair became public he had sought counsel at a religious organization called The Family, of which he became a member when he was a Representative in Washington, D.C. from 1995 to 2001. Two other leading Republican politicians who were members of The Family, Senator John Ensign and former Congressman Chip Pickering, were also caught engaging in extra-marital affairs at around the same time as Sanford.

== María Belén Chapur ==
On June 25, La Nación, a Buenos Aires newspaper, identified the Argentine woman as María Belén Chapur (also reported as "Maria Belen Shapur"), a 43-year-old divorced mother of two sons who speaks four languages: Spanish, Portuguese, English, and Chinese. She lives in the upscale district of Palermo, Buenos Aires. The State published details of e-mails between Sanford and a woman only identified as "Maria". Chapur, in a statement made to C5N (in Buenos Aires), confirmed the relationship, but refused to discuss the matter in detail – pointing out that e-mails between her and Sanford made public days on June 24 were a result of having had her computer hacked. An anonymous source sent the emails to The State. The Wall Street Journal notes that she has avoided contact with reporters despite local media interest in Argentina. In news conferences, Sanford has called Chapur his soulmate.

As the affair was reported, more background information on Chapur was reported in the American press. Chapur received a political science degree from the Pontifical Catholic University of Argentina and had previously worked as a translator and correspondent in 2001 for Canal América 2, an Argentine television station, and filed television news reports for the station's New York City bureau in the aftermath of the September 11 attacks.

In May 2010, several months after the conclusion of both divorce and impeachment proceedings against Sanford, he visited Chapur in Florida with the intention of rekindling their relationship.

== Immediate aftermath ==
Sanford resigned as Chairman of the Republican Governors Association, but made no comment about the possibility of resigning his position as Governor of South Carolina.

"Backroom political maneuvering may keep him in office another 18 months, but everyone knows his governorship, and likely any political future, is over," opined Dr. Benjamin Ladner in The State on July 2, 2009.

Sanford remained with his family on Thursday, June 25, 2009, at his beach home and was planning to return to work for cabinet meetings the next day. Sanford's wife and their children moved out of the governor's mansion on August 7, 2009, leaving Sanford behind.

On December 11, 2009, Jenny Sanford announced that she was filing for divorce, calling it a "sad and painful process." On February 26, 2010, a Charleston County, South Carolina Family Court Judge approved her request. Following the divorce, Jenny Sanford retained ownership of the Sullivan's Island home.

Later, Sanford indicated he had no intention of resigning, even though some State officials and citizens were calling for his resignation. However, Sanford defended the legitimacy of a previous two country trip organized by the South Carolina Department of Commerce, but said that he would reimburse the government for the Argentina part.

== Impeachment proceedings and censure ==
On August 25, 2009, state representatives Nathan Ballentine and Gary Simrill met with Sanford and warned him that the state legislature would impeach him if he did not resign. Ballentine, an ally of Sanford's, said afterward, "I told him the writing is on the wall...he could put an end to it all, but if he doesn't, members of the House will take things into their hands." Sanford declined to resign.

On August 28, The Washington Times reported that Republican legislators in South Carolina were "laying plans" for a special legislative session on whether to impeach Sanford. Two bills of impeachment were being prepared; they had bipartisan support in the state legislature.

On October 23, two impeachment resolutions were introduced, but were blocked by Democrats in the South Carolina legislature. A month later, the resolution was successfully introduced and it was announced that an ad hoc committee would begin drafting articles of impeachment starting on November 24. Meanwhile, the Ethics Commission formally charged the Governor with 37 violations.

On December 3, during its third public hearing on the matter, the ad hoc committee unanimously voted to drop the vast majority of charges from the investigation, saying that they did not warrant "overturning an election." On December 9, the committee voted 6–1 against impeachment. However, they did vote unanimously to censure the governor. On December 16, the full House Judiciary Committee voted 15–6 for censure, formally ending the process.

Among the reasons given for the decision not to remove Sanford from office included the fact that his governorship was going to expire in any event come January 2011 (Sanford was term limited and ineligible for re-election) and the fact that André Bauer (the man who would have replaced him) was seen to be a rival to others with serious interest in obtaining the 2010 Republican nomination for governor.

== Post-governorship ==
After leaving office, Sanford was photographed in January 2011 by the Argentinian magazine Caras together with Chapur at a Uruguayan resort in Punta del Este.

In August 2011, in an interview with the New York Times, Sanford was asked whether it was still the case that Chapur was his "soul mate". He responded, "I would say that I have more than well described all of my emotions and feelings toward Maria. And out of fairness to my boys and to folks that I've hurt, I'm not going to say more than this: any of those seemingly goofy feelings that I described a couple years back have intensified, not dissipated, with time."

In August 2012, Sanford became engaged to Chapur.

In 2013, Sanford ran in and won the special election to fill the vacancy created by the resignation of Tim Scott from the United States House of Representatives. Chapur made no public appearances during the campaign with the exception of one. She attended the victory party on April 2 to celebrate Sanford's winning the Republican primaries. The party was the first time that Chapur met two of Sanford's children.

Sanford would go on to serve two more terms in Congress, but in 2018, he was ousted in his party's primary election by Katie Arrington, who managed to barely avoid a runoff. Arrington lost to Democrat Joe Cunningham, in a very close race flipping the seat.

Sanford and Chapur's engagement was broken off in September 2014.

Sanford was reportedly romantically involved with journalist Olivia Nuzzi in 2020, while she was reporting on his campaign.

== See also ==
- List of solved missing person cases (post-2000)
