= List of Halloween television specials =

This is a list of Halloween television specials and Halloween-themed television episodes.

== American or Canadian Halloween-themed TV ==
=== Crime and mystery ===
- 21 Jump Street: "Old Haunts in a New Age" (1989)
- Adam-12: "Trick or Treat" (1991)
- Agatha Christie's Poirot: "Hallowe'en Party" (2010)
- Blue Bloods: "Nightmares" (2012)
- Boomtown: "All Hallow's Eve" (2002)
- Dexter: "Let's Give the Boy a Hand" (2006)
- Encyclopedia Brown: "The Case of the Ghostly Rider" (1990)
- High Potential: "Chasing Ghosts" (2025)
- Hunter: "Killer in a Halloween Mask" (1985)
- Magnum, P.I.: "The Woman on the Beach" (1981)
- Magnum, P.I. (2018 TV series): "Make It 'til Dawn" (2019)
- McMillan and Wife: "The Devil You Say" (1973)
- Mike Hammer, Private Eye: "Halloween" (1997)
- Monk: "Mr. Monk Goes Home Again" (2005)
- New York Undercover: "Kill The Noise" (1996)
- Numbers: "Dreamland" (2009)
- Perry Mason: "The Case of the Dodging Domino" (1962)
- The Player: "The Norseman" (2015)
- Psych (Season 6, Episode 3): "This Episode Sucks" (2011)
- Sleepy Hollow: "Dead Men Tell No Tales" (2015)
- The Snoop Sisters: "The Devil Made Me Do It" (1974)
- Stalker: "The Haunting" (2014)
- Starsky and Hutch: "The Vampire" (1976)

==== 9-1-1 ====
- "Haunted" (2018)
- "Monsters" (2019)
- "Ghost Stories" (2021)
- "Masks" (2024)
- "Día de los Muertos" (2025)

==== Bones ====
- "Mummy in the Maze" (2007)
- "The Resurrection in the Remains" (2015)

==== Castle ====
- Castle: "Vampire Weekend" (2009)
- Castle: "Demons" (2011)
- Castle: "PhDead" (2015)

==== CHiPs ====
- CHiPs: "Trick or Trick" (1978)
- CHiPs: "Rock Devil Rock" (1982)

==== The Commish ====
- The Commish: "Nothing to Fear But..." (1991)
- The Commish: "The Witches of Eastbridge" (1992)

==== Criminal Minds ====
- Criminal Minds: "About Face" (2007)
- Criminal Minds: "Devil's Night" (2010)
- Criminal Minds: "The Good Earth" (2012)
- Criminal Minds: "In the Blood" (2013)
- Criminal Minds: "Boxed In" (2014)
- Criminal Minds: "Keeper" (2016)

==== CSI (franchise) ====
- CSI: Miami: "Hell Night" (2004)
- CSI: Miami: "Curse of the Coffin" (2006)
- CSI: Crime Scene Investigation: "The Chick Chop Flick Shop" (2007)
- CSI: NY: "Boo" (2007)
- CSI: Crime Scene Investigation: "Let It Bleed" (2008)
- CSI: Miami: "By the Book" (2011)
- CSI: NY: "Get Me Out of Here!" (2011)
- CSI: Crime Scene Investigation: "Play Dead" (2012)

==== The Hardy Boys/Nancy Drew Mysteries ====
- The Hardy Boys/Nancy Drew Mysteries: "The Mystery of the Haunted House" (1977)
- The Hardy Boys/Nancy Drew Mysteries: "A Haunting We Will Go" (1977)
- The Hardy Boys/Nancy Drew Mysteries: "The Hardy Boys and Nancy Drew Meet Dracula, Part I" (1977)
- The Hardy Boys/Nancy Drew Mysteries: "The Hardy Boys and Nancy Drew Meet Dracula, Part II" (1977)
- The Hardy Boys/Nancy Drew Mysteries: "The House on Possessed Hill" (1978)
- The Hardy Boys/Nancy Drew Mysteries: "Voodoo Doll: Part 1" (1978)
- The Hardy Boys/Nancy Drew Mysteries: "Voodoo Doll: Part 2" (1978)

==== Hawaii Five-0 ====
- Hawaii Five-0: "Ka Iwi Kapu" ("Sacred Bones") (2011)
- Hawaii Five-0: "Mohai" ("Offering") (2012)
- Hawaii Five-0: "Kupouli ‘la" ("Broken") (2013)
- Hawaii Five-0: "Ho‘oma‘ike" ("Unmasked") (2014)
- Hawaii Five-0: "Na Pilikua Nui" ("Monsters") (2015)
- Hawaii Five-0: "Ka hale ho‘okauweli" ("House of horrors") (2016)
- Hawaii Five-0: "Kama‘oma‘o, ka ‘aina huli hana" ("At Kama'oma'o, the land of activities") (2017)
- Hawaii Five-0:" "A‘ohe mea ‘imi a ka maka" ("Nothing more the eyes to search for") (2018)
- Hawaii Five-0: "He ‘oi‘o kuhihewa; he kaka ola i ‘ike ‘ia e ka makaula" ("Don't blame ghosts and spirits for one's troubles; a human is responsible") (2019)

==== Law & Order (franchise) ====
- Law & Order: "Out of Control" (1991)
- Law & Order: Criminal Intent: "Masquerade" (2006)
- Law & Order: Special Victims Unit:
  - "Closure (Part I)" (2000)
  - "Missing Pieces" (2011)
  - "Glasgowman's Wrath" (2014)

==== Murder, She Wrote ====
- Murder, She Wrote: "Reflections of the Mind" (1985)
- Murder, She Wrote: "Night of the Headless Horseman" (1987)
- Murder, She Wrote: "Fire Burn, Cauldron Bubble" (1989)
- Murder, She Wrote: "The Witch's Curse" (1992)
- Murder, She Wrote: "Legacy of Borbey House" (1993)
- Murder, She Wrote: "Nan's Ghost" (1995)

==== NCIS (franchise) ====
- NCIS: "Witch Hunt" (2006)
- NCIS: "Murder 2.0" (2008)
- NCIS: "Code of Conduct" (2009)
- NCIS: "Cracked" (2010)
- NCIS: "Oil & Water" (2013)
- NCIS: "Parental Guidance Suggested" (2014)
- NCIS: New Orleans: "Master of Horror" (2014)
- NCIS: "Viral" (2015)
- NCIS: "Shell Game" (2016)
- NCIS: "Beneath the Surface" (2018)

==== The Wild Wild West ====
- The Wild Wild West: "The Night of the Druid's Blood" (1966)
- The Wild Wild West: "The Night of the Big Blast" (1966)
- The Wild Wild West: "The Night of the Wolf" (1967)

=== Sketch and variety shows ===
- Carman's Halloween Concert: Trinity Broadcasting Network (Halloween Night 1998)
- Elvira's Halloween Special (1986)
- Hee Haw: "Ray Stevens / Susan Raye" (1975)
- Key & Peele:
  - "Michael Jackson Halloween" (2012)
  - "Sexy Vampires" (2013)
  - "Scariest Movie Ever" (2014)
- Laugh In: "Episode #73" (1970)
- Mad TV:
- Nick Jr. Face
  - "Face the Monster"
  - "Face Has a Leaf for a Nose"
- The Paul Lynde Halloween Special (1976/ABC)
- Saturday Night Live
  - "The David S. Pumpkins Halloween Special" (2017/NBC)
- The Sonny & Cher Hour: "Show 51 - Halloween Episode with Jerry Lewis" (1973)
- The Sonny & Cher Show: "Show 17 (Halloween/Election Day Episode)" (1976)
- The State (American TV series)
  - "The State's 43rd Annual All-Star Halloween Special" (1995)
- Sunny Bunnies
  - "Spooky Bunnies" (2019)
  - "Trick or Treat" (2020)
  - "The Halloween Fairy" (2021)

=== Drama ===
- 7th Heaven: "Halloween" (1996)
- The Affair: "504" (2019)
- Chicago Fire: "All the Proof" (2018)
- Chicago Fire : " Haunted House" (2022)
- Chicago Fire : "Ghosts"(2025)
- Chicago Med: ""What's Hiding in the Dark"" (2025)
- Chicago Hope: "Who Turned Out the Lights?" (1995)
- Dead Like Me: "Haunted" (2004) - Season 2, Episode 15
- Doctor Odyssey: "Halloween Week" (2024)
- Euphoria: "The Next Episode" (2019)
- Every Year After: "Goodbye..." (2026)
- Evil: "October 31" (2019)
- The Fitzpatricks: "Halloween" (1977)
- I'll Fly Away: "Beyond Here Dar Be Dragons" (1991)
- Life Goes On: "Halloween" (1990)
- Lou Grant: "Ghosts" (1982)
- Melrose Place: "Amanda Unplugged" (1995)
- Models Inc.: "Clash of the Super Vixens" (1994)
- The Practice: "Search and Seizure" (1997)
- Private Practice: "All in the Family" (2010)
- Pushing Daisies: "Girth" (2007)
- Quarry: "Carnival of Souls" (2016)
- Route 66: "Lizard's Leg and Owlet's Wing" (1962)
- Scorpion: "True Colors" (2014)
- The L Word: Generation Q: "Last to Know" (2022)
- The Television Ghost: Episode dated October 30, 1931
- Thirtysomething: "The Haunting of DAA" (1990)
- This Is Us: "The 20s" (2017)
- Trauma: "Masquerade" (2009)
- True Blood: "And When I Die" (2011)
- Truth Be Told: "All That Was Lost" (2020)
- The Waltons: "The Changeling" (1978)
- Yellowjackets: "Blood Hive" (2021)
- Zorro: "The Ghost of the Mission" (1957)

==== Dr. Quinn, Medicine Woman ====
- Dr. Quinn, Medicine Woman: "Halloween" (1993)
- Dr. Quinn, Medicine Woman: "Halloween II" (1994)
- Dr. Quinn, Medicine Woman: "Halloween III" (1995)

==== ER ====
- ER: "Ghosts" (1996)
- ER: "Masquerade" (1998)
- ER: "A Hopeless Wound" (2002)
- ER: "Haunted" (2008)

==== Grey's Anatomy ====
- "Haunt You Every Day" (2007)
- "Thriller" (2013)
- "Flowers Grow Out of My Grave" (2018)
- "Whistlin' Past the Graveyard" (2019)
- "Haunted" (2022)

==== Lassie ====
- Lassie: "Trapped" (1958)
- Lassie: "Wings of the Ghost" (1971)

==== Little House on the Prairie ====
- Little House on the Prairie: "The Monster of Walnut Grove" (1976)
- Little House on the Prairie: "The Halloween Dream" (1979)

==== Our House ====
- Our House: "Small Steps Up a Tall Mountain" (1986)
- Our House: "The Haunting" (1987)

==== The Resident ====
- The Resident: "Nightmares" (2018)
- The Resident: "Belief System" (2019)
- The Resident: "The Thinnest Veil" (2021)

==== St. Elsewhere ====
- St. Elsewhere: "Haunted" (1985)
- St. Elsewhere: "Night of the Living Bed" (1987)

=== Action ===
- Alias: "Doppelgänger" (2001)
- The New Adventures of Beans Baxter: "A Nightmare on Beans' Street" (1987)
- Relic Hunter: "Vampire's Kiss" (2001)

==== Chuck ====
- "Chuck Versus the Sandworm" (2007)
- "Chuck Versus the Aisle of Terror" (2010)

==== The Dukes of Hazzard ====
- The Dukes of Hazzard: "The Ghost of General Lee" (1979)
- The Dukes of Hazzard: "The Hazzardville Horror" (1980)

==== The Fall Guy ====
- The Fall Guy: "October the 31st" (1984)
- The Fall Guy: "October the Thirty Second" (1985)

==== MacGyver ====
- MacGyver: "Ghost Ship" (1987)
- MacGyver: "The Secret of Parker House" (1988)
- MacGyver: "Halloween Knights" (1989)
- MacGyver: "Lesson in Evil" (1990)

==== Walker, Texas Ranger ====
- "Evil in the Night" (1995)
- "The Children of Halloween" (1998)

=== Supernatural, fantasy and sci-fi ===
- 666 Park Avenue: "A Crowd of Demons" (2012)
- The Amazing Spider-Man: "The Kirkwood Haunting" (1978)
- Angel: "Life of the Party" (2003)
- Beyond Belief: Fact or Fiction: For the Record/Halloween/Precious/Get Your Kicks at Motel 66/Phantom Drifter (2000)
- Blood Drive: "In the Crimson Halls of Kane Hill" (2017)
- Constantine: "The Rage of Caliban" (2014)
- Crazyhead: "Beaver With a Chainsaw" (2016)
- Dark Angel: "Boo" (2001)
- Dead Like Me: "Haunted" (2004)
- Early Edition: "Halloween" (1998)
- Eastwick: "Bonfire and Betrayal" (2009)
- Eerie, Indiana: "America's Scariest Home Video" (1991)
- Fear Itself: "The Spirit Box" (2008)
- The Flash (1990 TV series): "Double Vision" (1990)
- The Flash (2014 TV series): "There Will Be Blood" (2019)
- FlashForward: "Scary Monsters and Super Creeps" (2009)
- Freddy's Nightmares:
  - "Freddy's Tricks and Treats" (1988)
  - "Photo Finish" (1989)
- Friday the 13th: The Series: "Hellowe'en" (1987)
- Galactica 1980: "The Night the Cylons Landed" (1980)
- Grimm: "La Llorona" (2012) - Season 2, Episode 9
- Haunting of Hill House: 'Witness Marks" (2018)
- Haven: "Real Estate" (2012)
- Hercules: The Legendary Journeys: "Mummy Dearest" (1996)
- The Incredible Hulk: "The Haunted" (1979)
- K-9: "Regeneration" (2009)
- Legends of Tomorrow:
  - "Phone Home" (2017)
  - "Witch Hunt" (2018)
- Medium: "Bite Me" (2009)
- Millennium: "The Curse of Frank Black" (1997)
- Nancy Drew: "The Haunted Ring" (2019)
- Night Gallery: "Fright Night" (1972)
- Once Upon a Time: "Beauty" (2017)
- The Pretender: "Back from the Dead Again" (1997)
- Reaper: "Leon" (2007)
- The Secret Circle: "Masked" (2011)
- Servant: "Boo!" (2023)
- Special Unit 2: "The Eve" (2001)
- Star Trek: "Catspaw" (1967)
- Stitchers: "When Darkness Falls" (2015)
- Stranger Things: "Chapter Two: Trick or Treat, Freak" (2017)
- Supergirl: "Survivors" (2016)
- The Television Ghost: An unnamed Halloween episode, believed to be the first Halloween television special (1931)
- Tales from the Crypt: "Only Skin Deep" (1994)
- The Twilight Zone: "The Howling Man" (1960)
- Ultraman Tiga: "On Halloween Night" (1996)
- Werewolf by Night (2022)
- Ultraman R/B: "Everyone Is Friends" (2018)
- What If...?: "What If... Zombies?!" (2021)
- Xena: Warrior Princess: "Girls Just Wanna Have Fun" (1996)

==== Amazing Stories ====
- 1985
  - "Ghost Train" (1985)
  - "Mummy, Daddy" (1985)
  - "Boo!" (1986)
  - "Go to the Head of the Class" (1986)
  - "Welcome to My Nightmare" (1986)
- 2020: "Dynoman and the Volt!" (2020)

==== American Horror Story ====
- AHS: Murder House: "Halloween" (2011)
- AHS: Asylum: "Tricks and Treats" (2012)
- AHS: Coven: "Fearful Pranks Ensue" (2013)
- AHS: Freak Show: "Edward Mordrake" (2014)
- AHS: Hotel: "Devil's Night" (2015)
- AHS: Roanoke: "Chapter 7" (2016)
- AHS: Cult: "Drink the Kool-Aid" (2017)
- AHS: Apocalyspe: "Sojourn" (2018)
- AHS: 1984: "Episode 100" (2019)
- AHS: Double Feature: "Blood Buffet" (2021)

==== Buffy the Vampire Slayer/Angel ====
- Buffy the Vampire Slayer:
  - "Halloween" (1997)
  - "Fear, Itself" (1999)
  - "All the Way" (2001)
- Angel: "Life of the Party (Angel episode)" (2003)

==== Charmed ====
- "All Halliwell's Eve" (2000)
- "Kill Billie, Volume 1" (2005)

==== Charmed (2018) ====
- "Sweet Tooth" (2018)
- "Be Careful What You Witch For" (2019)

==== Chilling Adventures of Sabrina ====
- "Chapter 1: October Country" (2018)
- "Chapter 2: Dark Baptism" (2018)

==== Chucky ====
- "Give Me Something Good to Eat" (2021)
- "Halloween II" (2022)
- "Dressed to Kill" (2023)

==== Ghost Hunters ====
see also List of Ghost Hunters episodes#Specials

- "Halloween Special" (2005)
- "Ghost Hunters Live Stanley Hotel Halloween Special" (2006)
- "Ghost Hunters Live Waverly Hills Sanatorium Halloween Special" (2007)
- "Ghost Hunters Live Fort Delaware Halloween Special" (2008)
- "Ghost Hunters Live Essex County Sanitarium Halloween Special" (2009)
- "Ghost Hunters Live Buffalo Central Terminal Halloween Special" (2010)
- "Ghost Hunters Live Pennhurst State School and Hospital Halloween Special" (2011)

==== Ghost Whisperer ====
- "A Grave Matter" (2006)
- "Weight of What Was" (2007)
- "Head Over Heels" (2009)

==== Good Witch ====
- "Good Witch Halloween" (2015)
- "Secrets of Grey House" (2016)
- "Good Witch Spellbound" (2017)
- "Tale of Two Hearts" (2018)
- "Curse from a Rose" (2019)

==== Goosebumps ====
- "Say Cheese and Die!" (2023)
- "The Haunted Mask" (2023)
- "The Cuckoo Clock of Doom" (2023)
- "Go Eat Worms" (2023)

==== The Greatest American Hero ====
- "The Beast in Black" (1981)
- "A Chicken in Every Pot" (1982)
- "The Devil and the Deep Blue Sea" (1982)
- "The Resurrection of Carlini" (1982)

==== Haunted Lives: True Ghost Stories ====
- "Episode 1" (1991)
- "Episode 2" (1992)
- "Episode 3" AKA "Real Ghosts" (1995)

==== Highway to Heaven ====
- "The Devil and Jonathan Smith" (1985)
- "I Was a Middle Aged Werewolf" (1987)

==== Into the Dark ====
- "The Body" (2018)
- "Uncanny Annie" (2019)

==== Knight Rider ====
- "Halloween Knight" (1984)
- "Voodoo Knight" (1986)

==== Lois & Clark: The New Adventures of Superman ====
- "When Irish Eyes Are Killing" (1995)
- "Never on Sunday" (1996)
- "Ghosts" (1996)

==== Night Man ====
- Night Man: "Constant Craving" (1998)
- Night Man: "Book of the Dead" (1998)
- Night Man: "Fear City" (1998)

==== Quantum Leap ====
- "The Boogieman" (1990)
- "The Curse of Ptah-Hotep" (1992)
- '"Blood Moon" (1993)

==== Smallville ====
- Smallville: "Spell" (2004)
- Smallville: "Thirst" (2005)

==== Superboy ====
- Superboy: "Young Dracula" (1989)
- Superboy: "Run, Dracula, Run" (1990)
- Superboy: "The Haunting of Andy McAlister" (1990)
- Superboy: "Werewolf" (1991)
- Superboy: "Hell Breaks Loose" (1991)

==== Supernatural ====
- Supernatural: "It's the Great Pumpkin, Sam Winchester" (2008)
- Supernatural: "Mint Condition" (2018)

==== Tales from the Darkside ====
- Tales from the Darkside: "Trick or Treat" (1983)
- Tales from the Darkside: "Halloween Candy" (1985)
- Tales from the Darkside: "The Cutty Black Sow" (1988)

==== Teen Wolf ====
- Teen Wolf: 'Galvanize" (2014)
- Teen Wolf: "Illuminated" (2014)

==== Touched by an Angel ====
- Touched by an Angel: "The Occupant" (1999)
- Touched by an Angel: "The Invitation" (2000)

==== Unsolved Mysteries ====
- Unsolved Mysteries: "Episode #3" (1988)
- Unsolved Mysteries: "Episode #207" (1992)

==== The Vampire Diaries ====
- The Vampire Diaries: "Haunted" (2009)
- The Vampire Diaries: "Masquerade" (2010)
- The Vampire Diaries: "Ghost World" (2011)
- The Vampire Diaries: "The Five" (2012)
- The Vampire Diaries: "Monster's Ball" (2013)
- The Vampire Diaries: "The World Has Turned and Left Me Here" (2014)
- The Vampire Diaries: "I Carry Your Heart with Me" (2015)

==== Wonder Woman ====
- Wonder Woman: "The Starships Are Coming" (1979)
- Wonder Woman: "Phantom of the Roller Coaster - Part 1" (1979)
- Wonder Woman: "Phantom of the Roller Coaster - Part 2" (1979)

=== Teen drama ===
- My So-Called Life: "Halloween" (1994)
- Party of Five: "Personal Demons" (1996)
- Felicity: "Spooked" (1998)
- Freaks and Geeks: "Tricks and Treats" (1999)
- Veronica Mars: "President Evil" (2006)
- 90210: "Unmasked" (2009)
- Revenge: "Masquerade" (2013)
- 13 Reasons Why: "Tape 2, Side B" (2017)
- On My Block: "Chapter Four" (2018)
- Elite (TV series): "63 horas desaparecido" (2019)
- Trinkets: "Ghouls Just Wanna Have Fun" (2020)
- One of Us Is Lying (TV series): "One of Us Is Dead" (2022)

==== Freeform ====
The TV channel Freeform (dating back to when it was known as Fox Family) annually presented their special "13 Nights of Halloween" with specialized Halloween episodes of regularly scheduled programs, as well as specified Halloween specials and movies to play for the 13 nights leading up to October 31. This was expanded to the entire 31 nights of October in 2018.

==== Beverly Hills, 90210 ====
- "Halloween" (1991)
- "Things That Go Bang in the Night" (1994)
- "Gypsies, Cramps, and Fleas" (1995)
- "Fearless" (1996)

==== Dawson's Creek ====
- "The Scare" (1998)
- "Escape from Witch Island" (1999)
- "Four Scary Stories" (2001)
- "Living Dead Girl" (2002)

==== Degrassi: The Next Generation ====
- Degrassi: The Next Generation: "Degrassi of the Dead" (2007)
- Degrassi: The Next Generation: "The Curse of Degrassi" (2008)

==== Gossip Girl ====
- "The Handmaiden's Tale" (2007)
- "How to Succeed in Bassness" (2009)

==== Gossip Girl (2021) ====
- "Hope Sinks" (2021)

==== One Tree Hill ====
- "An Attempt to Tip the Scales" (2005)
- "Not Afraid" (2010)

==== Pretty Little Liars ====
- "The First Secret" (2011)
- "This Is a Dark Ride" (2012)
- "Grave New World" (2013)
- Pretty Little Liars: Original Sin:
  - "Chapter Four: The Fe(Male) Gaze" (2022)
  - "Chapter Five: The Night He Came Home" (2022)

==== Riverdale ====
- "Chapter Sixty-One: Halloween" (2019)
- "Chapter One Hundred Twenty-Eight: Halloween II" (2023)

==== Scream ====
- Scream: "Pilot" (2015)
- Scream: "The Dance" (2015)
- Scream: "Revelations" (2015)
- Scream: "Halloween" (2016)
- Scream: "Halloween II" (2016)
- Scream: "The Deadfast Club" (2019)
- Scream: "The Man Behind the Mask" (2019)

==== Scream Queens ====
- "Haunted House" (2015)
- "Pumpkin Patch" (2015)
- "Seven Minutes in Hell" (2015)
- "Halloween Blues" (2016)

=== Comedy-drama ===
- 1000 Ways to Die: "Grave Decisions: The Halloween Episode" (2011)
- Ally McBeal: "Girls' Night Out" (2000) (Season 4, Episode 2)
- And Just Like That…: "Trick or Treat" (2023) (Season 2, Episode 5)
- Better Things: "Scary Fun" (2016)
- Black Monday: "Who Are You Supposed to Be?" (2020)
- Blindspotting: "By Hook or by Crook" (2023)
- The Carrie Diaries: "Fright Night" (2013)
- Cupid: "Meat Market" (1998)
- The Days and Nights of Molly Dodd: "Here Are Some Things That Go Bump in the Night" (1990)
- Dead Like Me: "Haunted" (2004)
- Doogie Howser, M.D.: "Revenge of the Teenage Dead" (1990)
- Elsbeth: "Ick, A Bold!" (2025)
- Flying High: "In the Still of the Night" (1978)
- Franklin & Bash: "Spirits in the Material World" (2014)
- Gilmore Girls: "Twenty-One Is the Loneliest Number" (2005)
- Glee: "The Rocky Horror Glee Show" (2010)
- Hindsight: "A Very Important Date" (2015)
- Kevin Can F**k Himself: "Ghost" (2022)
- Las Vegas: "When Life Gives You Lemon Bars" (2007)
- Looking: "Looking For Gordon Freeman" (2014)
- M*A*S*H: "Trick or Treatment" (1982)
- Mr. Corman "Action Adventure" (2021)
- Northern Exposure: "Jules et Joel" (1991)
- Orange Is The New Black: "Mischief Mischief" (2018)
- Parenthood (1990 series): "Hollow Halloween" (1990)
- Parenthood (2010 series): "Orange Alert" (2010)
- Picket Fences: "Remembering Rosemary" (1992)
- Pushing Daisies: "Girth" (2007)
- Resident Alien: "The Alien Within" (2022)
- Scrubs: "My Big Brother" (2002)
- Teachers: "Nightmare On Fillmore Street" (2017)
- Ugly Betty: "The Lyin', the Watch and the Wardrobe" (2006)
- Undone: "That Halloween Night" (2019)
- WandaVision: "All-New Halloween Spooktacular!" (2021)

==== Boston Legal ====
- "Witches of Mass Destruction" (Season 2, Episode 6) (November 1, 2005)
- "Trick or Treat" (Season 3, Episode 7) (October 31, 2006)

==== Desperate Housewives ====
- "Now I Know, Don't Be Scared" (Season 4, Episode 6) (November 4, 2007)
- "Excited and Scared" (Season 7, Episode 6) (October 31, 2010)
- "Witch's Lament" (Season 8, Episode 6) (October 30, 2011)

==== Elsbeth ====
- "Devil's Night" (2024)
- "Ick, A Bod" (2025)

==== Hart of Dixie ====
- "The Undead & the Unsaid" (Season 1, Episode 6) (November 7, 2011)
- "Walkin' After Midnight" (Season 2, Episode 5) (October 30, 2012)
- "Help Me Make It Through the Night" (Season 3, Episode 4) (October 28, 2013)

=== Reality shows ===
- The Anna Nicole Show: "Halloween Party" (2002)
- Bethenny Ever After : "Halloween in the Hills"
- Cake Boss: "Creepy Crawly Cake and Haunted House" (2017)
  - "Creeps, Carvings, and Coffins" (2009)
- Chrisley Knows Best / Growing Up Chrisley: "A Very Grisly Chrisley" (2016)
  - "Boos Brothers" (2021)
- Criss Angel Mindfreak: "Halloween Special" (2006)
- Drugs Inc.: "Detroit Halloween" (2015)
- Here Comes Honey Boo Boo:
  - "A Very Boo Halloween" (2013)
  - "Halloween Too" (2014)
- Jon & Kate Plus 8: "10 Little Pumpkins" (2007)
- Kate Plus 8: "A Haunting at the Gosselins" (2017)
- The Little Couple: "Bill's Surgery" (2015)
- Little People Big World: "Halloween Harvest Hustle" (2007)
- Long Island Medium: "Halloween Spirit" (2012)
- Newlyweds: Nick and Jessica: "Jess Gets a Root Canal" (2005)
- The Osbournes: "The Show Must Go Oz" (2004)
- OutDaughtered:
  - "A Nightmare on Quint Street"
  - "Too Scared to Sleep" (2021)
- Pawn Stars: "Rick or Treat" (2011)
- Sister Wives: "Carving Into Polygamy" (2011)
- Shahs of Sunset: "A Nightmare on Destiny Street" (2021)
- Southern Charm: "Pulp Friction" (2018)
- Teen Mom :
  - "Forgive and Forget"(2016)
  - "Surprise, Surprise" (2015)
  - "Momster Mash" (2019)
- Teen Mom 2: "The Hangover" (2018)

==== The Girls Next Door ====
- "Ghostbusted" (2005)
- "Girls Will Be Ghouls" (2006)
- "Scream Test" (2008)

==== The Real Housewives Franchise ====
- The Real Housewives of Atlanta:
  - "Nightmare on Peachtree Street" (2018)
  - "If You Got It, Haunt It" (2021)
- The Real Housewives of Beverly Hills: "Meet Rinna Jayne" (2019)
- The Real Housewives of Dallas: "Face to Two Face" (2017)
- The Real Housewives of New Jersey:
  - "Drop Dead Gorgas" (2011)
  - "House of Horrors" (2021)
- The Real Housewives of New York City:
  - "Unfashionable Late" (2009)
  - "Ghouls Just Wanna Have Fun" (2018)
  - "Shark Bait" (2019)
  - "Shalloween" (2019)
  - "Love Him and Leave Them" (2020)
  - "Eat, Drink, and Be Scary" (2020)
  - "Stop and Throw the Roses" (2021)
  - "Electile Dysfunction" (2021)

=== Teen and adult sitcoms ===
- 30 Rock: "Stone Mountain" (2009)
- 3rd Rock from the Sun: "Scaredy Dick" (1997)
- A to Z: "E Is for Ectoplasm" (2014)
- About a Boy: "About a Will-O-Ween" (2014)
- Accidental Family: "Halloween's on Us" (1967)
- The Adventures of Ozzie and Harriet: "Halloween Party" (1952)
- Awkward: "That Girl Strikes Again" (2013)
- Alexa & Katie: "PB Without J" (2018)
- ALF: "Some Enchanted Evening" (1987)
- Baby Daddy: "Strip or Treat" (2014)
- Bachelor Father: "The House at Smuggler's Cove" (1961)
- Back in the Game: "Night Games" (2013)
- Barney Miller: "Werewolf" (1976)
- Ben and Kate: "Scaredy Kate" (2012)
- Benson: "The Stranger" (1985)
- The Bernie Mac Show: "Night of Terror" (2005)
- Bette: "Halloween" (2000)
- Better with You: "Better with Halloween" (2010)
- Bless This Mess: "Scare Night" (2019)
- Blockbuster: "Evan and Trevin" (2022)
- Blossom: "All Hallows Eve" (1992)
- Bonnie: "Here's a Little Halloween Twist" (1995)
- Bottom: "Terror" (1995)
- The Brady Bunch: "Fright Night" (1972)
- Brotherly Love: "Witchcraft" (1995)
- Brothers: "Masquerade" (1987)
- The Brothers Grunt: "Bring Me the Head of Perry the Grunt"
- Caroline in the City: "Caroline and the First Date" (1998)
- Charles in Charge: "Trick or Treat" (1984)
- The Charmings: "A Charming Halloween" (1987)
- Childrens Hospital: "I Am Not Afraid of Any Ghost" (2010)
- The Class: "The Class Goes Trick-or-Treating" (2006)
- Connecting: "Day 226" (2020)
- Conrad Bloom: "The Unsinkable Conrad Bloom" (1998)
- Cougar Town: "You Don't Know How It Feels" (2010)
- Cristela: "Hall-Oates-Ween" (2014)
- Curb Your Enthusiasm: "Trick or Treat" (2001)
- Cuts: "Reverse the Curse" (2005)
- Cybill: "Halloween" (1997)
- Daddy Dearest: "The Tortoise and the Scare" (1993)
- Dennis the Menace: "Haunted House" (1961)
- The Dick Van Dyke Show: "The Ghost of A. Chantz" (1964)
- A Different World: "The Little Mister" (1992)
- Diff'rent Strokes: "A Haunting We Will Go" (1984)
- Dinosaurs: "Little Boy Boo" (1992)
- Don't Trust the B— in Apartment 23 : "Love and Monsters..." (2012)
- Do Over: "Halloween Kiss" (2002)
- Drexell's Class: "Best Halloween Ever" (1991)
- Eddsworld:
  - "Halloween Special" (2005–07)
  - "Trick or Treat" (2015)
- Emeril: "Halloween" (2001)
- Empty Nest: "It's Not Easy Being Green" (1992)
- Eternally Yours: "Halloween" (2026)
- Evening Shade: "Night of the Living Newtons" (1993)
- Everybody Loves Raymond: "Halloween Candy" (1998)
- Faking It: "Spooking It" (2016)
- Family Reunion: "Remember When the Trick Wasn't a Treat?" (2021)
- Freddie: "Halloween" (2005)
- Free Spirit: "Hallowinnie" (1989)
- Friends: "The One with the Halloween Party" (2001)
- George & Leo: "The Halloween Show" (1997)
- Good Morning, Miami: "Kiss of the Spiderman" (2002)
- Great News: "Night of the Living Screen" (2017)
- The Gregory Hines Show: "Eight and a Half Months" (1997)
- Guys Like Us: "It's the Great Pumpkin, Maestro Harris" (1998)
- Guys With Kids: "Apartment Halloween" (2012)
- Happy Endings: "Spooky Endings" (2011)
- Happy Family: "Randall's Gift" (2003)
- Happy Hour: "Boo! This Party Sucks" (2006)
- Happy's Place: "Skeletons in the Closet" (2026)
- Hazel: "A-Haunting We Will Go" (1965)
- Hidden Hills: "Halloween" (2002)
- High Guardian Spice: "The Festival of the Fall" (2021)
- How to Rock: "How to Rock Halloween" (2012)
- I Dream of Jeannie: "My Master, the Ghostbreaker" (1968)
- I'm with Her: "All About Evil" (2003)
- In-Laws: "Halloween: Resurrection" (2002)
- Instant Mom: "Children of the Candy Corn" (2014)
- It's All Relative: "The Doctor Is Out" (2003)
- It's Always Sunny in Philadelphia: "Who Got Dee Pregnant?" (2010)
- The Jeff Foxworthy Show: "With Two You Get Cow's Milk" (1995)
- The Jeffersons: "Now You See It, Now You Don't" (1979)
- Jesse: "Boo! He's Back" (1998)
- The John Larroquette Show: "Isosceles Love Triangle" (1996)
- Just Shoot Me!: "Halloween? Halloween!" (2002)
- Kate & Allie: "Halloween II" (1986)
- Kevin Can Wait: "Hallow-We-Ain't-Home" (2016)
- King of Queens: "Ticker Treat" (2001)
- Kirk: "Helloween" (1995)
- Laverne & Shirley: "Ghost Story" (1983)
- The League: "Ghost Monkey" (2010)
- Less Than Perfect: "Knock, Knock, Who's Dead?" (2004)
- Life with Boys: "Do You Wanna Dance With Boys" (2012)
- Lopez vs Lopez: "Lopez vs Halloween" (2024)
- Louie: "Halloween; Ellie" (2011)
- Love That Girl!: "Trick or Treat" (2011)
- The Lucy Show: "Lucy and the Monsters" (1965)
- Mad About You: "The Unplanned Child" (1993)
- Major Dad: "There's No Place Like Farlow" (1992)
- Married: "Halloween" (2014)
- Married People: "Who You Gonna Call?" (1990)
- Marry Me: "Scary Me" (2014)
- Maybe It's Me: "The Halloween Episode" (2001)
- The Mayor: "City Hall-oween" (2017)
- Meego: "Halloween" (1997)
- The Mick: "The Haunted House" (2017)
- Mike & Molly: "Happy Halloween" (2011)
- The Millers: "Giving the Bird" (2013)
- The Mindy Project: "Halloween" (2012)
- Minor Adjustments: "Boo!" (1995)
- The Mommies: "Revenge of the Mommies" (1992)
- Mork & Mindy: "A Morkville Horror" (1979)
- Mr. Belvedere: "Halloween" (1986)
- Mr. Rhodes: "The Halloween Show" (1996)
- Mulaney: "Halloween" (2014)
- The Munsters: "Munster Masquerade" (1964)
- My Family: "Friday the 31st" (2003)
- My Name is Earl: "Little Bad Voodoo Brother" (2008)
- My Sister Sam: "Who's Afraid of Virginia Schultz?" (1986)
- The Nanny: "Maggie's Boyfriend" (1998)
- Nanny and the Professor: "Nanny and Her Witch's Brew" (1971)
- Ned & Stacey: "Halloween Story" (1995)
- The Neighborhood: "Welcome to the Haunting" (2021)
- The New Addams Family: "Halloween with the Addams Family" (1998)
- The New Adventures of Beans Baxter: "A Nightmare on Beans' Street" (1987)
- Newhart: "Take Me to Your Loudon" (1987)
- NewsRadio: "Halloween" (1996)
- Norm: "Norm vs. Halloween" (2000)
- The Odd Couple: "I Kid, You Not" (2016)
- Odd Man Out: "Batman Forever" (1999)
- One Day at a Time: "One Halloween at a Time" (2020)
- Out All Night: "Hammer Halloween" (1992)
- Outsourced: "Bolloween" (2010)
- The Paloni Show! Halloween Special! (2022)
- The Parent 'Hood: "The Taxi Man" (1995)
- The Parkers: "Scary Kim" (2000)
- Partners: "Who Are You Supposed to Be?" (1995)
- Perfect Harmony: "Halle-Boo-Yah!" (2019)
- The Preston Episodes: "The Halloween Episode" (1995)
- Raising Expectations: "The Haunter Becomes the Haunted" (2016)
- The Real McCoys: "The Ghostbreakers" (1959)
- The Real O'Neals: "The Real Halloween" (2016)
- Really Me: "Scary Poppins" (2012)
- Rel: "Halloween" (2018)
- Reno 911!: "Halloween" (2003)
- Resident Advisors: "Halloween" (2015)
- Rhoda: "Ida Works Out" (1977)
- Saved by the Bell: "Mystery Weekend" (1991)
- Shifting Gears: "Scary" (2025)
- Silver Spoons: "A Dark and Stormy Night" (1984)
- The Single Guy: "Love Train" (1996)
- Sister Kate: "Hilary's Date" (1989)
- Sister, Sister: "Halloween" (1995)
- Small Wonder: "The Lawsonville Horror" (1987)
- Something So Right: "Something About Schmoozing" (1996)
- Soul Man: "Trick and Treat" (1997)
- Spin City: "Local Hero" (1998)
- Square Pegs: "Halloween XII" (1982)
- Stark Raving Mad: "The Lyin' King" (1999)
- Sunnyside: "Skirt-Skirt" (2019)
- Super Fun Night: "Chick or Treat" (2013)
- Tacoma FD: "To Nightmare Manor" (2020)
- Ted: "Subways, Bicycles and Automobiles" (2024)
- Teen Angel: "I Love Nitzke" (1997)
- That Girl: "Secret Ballot" (1968)
- Too Something: "Maria Cooks" (1995)
- Trophy Wife: "Halloween" (2013)
- Twins: "Halloween Boo" (2005)
- Two of a Kind: "Nightmare on Carrie's Street" (1998)
- Undateable: "Halloween Walks Into a Bar" (2015)
- Unfabulous: "The Dark Side" (2005)
- Unhappily Ever After: "Hair Stalker" (1996)
- Valerie: "Nightmare on Oak Street" (1987)
- The Wayans Bros.: "Scared Straight" (1995)
- Welcome to the Family: "Halloween" (2013)
- Whitney: "The Wire" (2011)
- Wings: "The Gift of Life" (1996)
- Working: "Armageddon Outta Here" (1998)
- Yes, Dear: "Halloween" (2001)
- You Wish: "Halloween" (1997)
- You're The Worst: "Spooky Sunday Funday" (2015)

==== 8 Simple Rules ====
- "Trick or Treehouse" (Season 1, Episode 7) (October 29, 2002)
- "Halloween" (Season 3, Episode 6) (October 29, 2004)

==== Abbott Elementary ====
- "Candy Zombies" (October 29, 2022) (Season 2, Episode 7)
- "Costume Contest" (October 30, 2024) (Season 4, Episode 4)
- "Camping" (October 29, 2025) (Season 5, Episode 5)
- "Halloween Party" (October 28, 2026) (Season 6, Episode 4)

==== According to Jim ====
- "Unruly Spirits" (Season 1, Episode 5) (October 31, 2001)
- "Dana Dates Jim" (Season 3, Episode 7) (October 28, 2003)
- "Dress to Kill Me" (Season 4, Episode 5) (October 26, 2004)

==== The Addams Family ====
- "Halloween with the Addams Family" (Season 1, Episode 7) (October 30, 1964)
- "Halloween, Addams Style" (Season 2, Episode 7) (October 29, 1965)
- Halloween with the New Addams Family (October 30, 1977/NBC TV movie)

===== Adult Swim =====
- Aqua Teen Hunger Force:
  - "The Shaving" (2003)
- Black Dynamite (TV series):
  - "'Warriors Come Out' or 'The Mean Queens of Halloween'" (2014)
- The Boondocks:
  - "Stinkmeaner Strikes Back" (2007)
- Moral Orel:
  - "God-Fearing" (2006)
- My Adventures with Superman:
  - "Into the New World" (2026)
- Robot Chicken:
  - "The Robot Chicken Walking Dead Special: Look Who's Walking" (2017)
  - "Happy Russian Deathdog Dolloween 2 U" (2021)
- Squidbillies:
  - "The Tiniest Princess" (2006)
  - "Squash B'Gosh" (2016)
- Smiling Friends:
  - "A Silly Halloween Special" (2022)
  - "Erm, the Boss Finds Love?" (2024)
  - "Curse of the Green Halloween Witch" (2025)
- Tuca and Bertie:
  - "Corpse Week" (2021)

===== Alice =====
- "Alice's Halloween Surprise" (Season 6, Episode 4) (October 25, 1981)
- "Space Sharples" (Season 9, Episode 2) (October 28, 1984)

==== American Housewife ====
- "Westport Zombies" (October 25, 2016) (Season 1, Episode 3)
- "Boo-Who?" (October 25, 2017) (Season 2, Episode 3)
- "Trust Me" (October 24, 2018) (Season 3, Episode 5)
- "The Maze" (October 25, 2019) (Season 4, Episode 5)

==== The Beverly Hillbillies ====
- "Trick or Treat" (Season 1, Episode 6) (October 31, 1962)
- "Ghost of Clampett Castle" (Season 7, Episode 5) (October 23, 1968)

==== Bewitched / Tabitha ====
- "The Witches Are Out" (Season 1, Episode 7) (October 29, 1964)
- "Trick or Treat" (Season 2, Episode 7) (October 28, 1965)
- "Twitch or Treat" (Season 3, Episode 7) (October 27, 1966)
- "The Safe and Sane Halloween" (Season 4, Episode 8) (October 26, 1967)
- "To Trick or Treat or Not to Trick or Treat" (Season 6, Episode 7) (October 30, 1969)
- Tabitha:
  - "Halloween Show" (Season 1, Episode 2) (November 12, 1977)

==== The Big Bang Theory / Young Sheldon ====
- "The Middle Earth Paradigm" (Season 1, Episode 6) (October 29, 2007)
- "The Good Guy Fluctuation" (Season 5, Episode 7) (October 27, 2011)
- "The Holographic Excitation" (Season 6, Episode 5) (October 25, 2012)
- "The Imitation Perturbation" (Season 12, Episode 6) (October 25, 2018)
- Young Sheldon:
  - "Seven Deadly Sins and a Small Carl Sagan" (October 25, 2018) (Season 2, Episode 6)

==== Black-ish / Mixed-ish ====
- "The Prank King" (October 29, 2014) (Season 1, Episode 6)
- "Jacked o' Lantern" (October 28, 2015) (Season 2, Episode 6)
- "The Purge" (October 26, 2016) (Season 3, Episode 5)
- "Scarred for Life" (October 30, 2018) (Season 5, Episode 3)
- "Everybody Blames Raymond" (October 29, 2019) (Season 6, Episode 6)
- Mixed-ish:
  - "Girls Just Want to Have Fun" (October 29, 2019) (Season 1, Episode 6)

==== Boy Meets World / Girl Meets World ====
- "Boys II Mensa" (Season 1, Episode 6) (October 29, 1993)
- "Who's Afraid of Cory Wolf?" (Season 2, Episode 6) (October 28, 1994)
- "The Witches of Pennbrook" (Season 5, Episode 5) (October 31, 1997)
- "And Then There Was Shawn" (Season 5, Episode 17) (February 27, 1998)
- Girl Meets World:
  - "Girl Meets World of Terror" (Season 1, Episode 11) (October 2, 2014)
  - "Girl Meets World of Terror 2" (Season 2, Episode 18) (October 2, 2015)
  - "Girl Meets World of Terror 3" (Season 3, Episode 15) (October 14, 2016)

==== Brooklyn Nine-Nine ====
- "Halloween" (October 22, 2013) (Season 1, Episode 6)
- "Halloween II" (October 19, 2014) (Season 2, Episode 4)
- "Halloween III" (October 25, 2015) (Season 3, Episode 5)
- "Halloween IV" (October 18, 2016) (Season 4, Episode 5)
- "HalloVeen" (October 17, 2017) (Season 5, Episode 4)

==== Cheers ====
- "Fairy Tales Can Come True" (Season 3, Episode 4) (October 25, 1984)
- "Bar Wars V: the Final Judgement" (Season 10, Episode 7) (October 31, 1991)

==== Clueless ====
- "Making Up Is Hard to Do" (Season 1, Episode 6) (October 25, 1996)
- "Trick or Treat" (Season 2, Episode 6) (October 28, 1997)
- "Scream, Murray, Scream!"/"Scream Again, Murray, Scream Again!" (Season 3, Episodes 4-5) (October 27, 1998) (November 3, 1998)

==== Community ====
- "Introduction to Statistics" (October 29, 2009) (Season 1, Episode 7)
- "Epidemiology" (October 28, 2010) (Season 2, Episode 6)
- "Horror Fiction in Seven Spooky Steps" (October 27, 2011) (Season 3, Episode 5)
- "Paranormal Parentage" (February 14, 2013) (Season 4, Episode 2)

==== The Cosby Show ====
- "Halloween" (Season 2, Episode 6) (October 31, 1985)
- "Cliff's Mistake" (Season 4, Episode 4) (October 15, 1987)

==== Dave's World ====
- "Lobster Envy" (Season 2, Episode 8) (October 31, 1994)
- "A Very Barry Pumpkin Show" (Season 4, Episode 7) (November 1, 1996)

==== Dharma & Greg ====
- "A Closet Full of Hell" (Season 2, Episode 6) (October 28, 1998)
- "The Very Grateful Dead" (Season 3, Episode 6) (October 26, 1999)
- "Used Karma" (Season 5, Episode 7) (October 30, 2001)

==== Dr. Ken ====
- "Halloween-Aversary" (Season 1, Episode 5) (October 30, 2015)
- "D.K.'s Korean Ghost Story" (Season 2, Episode 5) (October 21, 2016)

==== The Drew Carey Show ====
- "The Devil, You Say" (Season 2, Episode 5) (October 30, 1996)
- "Drew Tries to Kill Mimi" (Season 5, Episode 6) (October 27, 1999)
- "It's Halloween, Dummy" (Season 7, Episode 7) (October 31, 2001)

==== Ellen ====
- "Trick or Treat – Who Cares?" (Season 3, Episode 6) (November 1, 1995)
- "The Bubble Gum Incident" (Season 4, Episode 6) (October 30, 1996)

==== Everybody Hates Chris ====
- "Everybody Hates Halloween" (October 27, 2005) (Season 1, Episode 6)

==== The Facts of Life ====
- "Fear Strikes Back" (Season 3, Episode 2) (November 4, 1981)
- "The Halloween Show" (Season 5, Episode 6) (October 26, 1983)

==== Family Matters ====
- "Dog Day Halloween" (Season 2, Episode 6) (October 26, 1990)
- "Whose Kid Is It Anyway?" (Season 4, Episode 6) (October 30, 1992)
- "Best Friends" (Season 5, Episode 6) (October 29, 1993)
- "Dark and Stormy Night" (Season 6, Episode 6) (October 28, 1994)
- "Stevil" (Season 8, Episode 7) (October 25, 1996)
- "Stevil II: This Time He's Not Alone" (Season 9, Episode 7) (October 31, 1997)

==== Frasier ====
- "Halloween" (Season 5, Episode 3) (October 28, 1997)
- "Room Full of Heroes" (Season 9, Episode 6) (October 30, 2001)
- "Tales from the Crypt" (Season 10, Episode 5) (October 29, 2002)

==== Fresh Off the Boat ====
- "Miracle on Dead Street" (October 27, 2015) (Season 2, Episode 5)
- "Louisween" (October 25, 2016) (Season 3, Episode 3)
- "It's a Plastic Pumpkin, Louis Huang" (October 24, 2017) (Season 5, Episode 3)
- "Working the 'Ween" (October 19, 2018) (Season 6, Episode 5)
- "Hal-lou-Ween" (October 25, 2019) (Season 7, Episode 5)

==== The Fresh Prince of Bel-Air ====
- "Someday Your Prince Will Be in Effect" (Season 1, Episode 8-9) (October 29, 1990)
- "Hex and the Single Guy" (Season 4, Episode 7) (October 25, 1993)

==== Full House / Fuller House ====
- "It's Not My Job" (Season 2, Episode 3) (October 28, 1988)
- "Divorce Court" (Season 3, Episode 8) (November 17, 1989)
- Fuller House:
  - "Curse of Tanner Manor" (Season 2, Episode 4) (2016)

==== George Lopez ====
- "Halloween Cheer" (Season 2, Episode 4) (October 23, 2002)
- "No One Gets Out Alive" (Season 3, Episode 7) (October 31, 2003)
- "Leave It to Lopez" (Season 4, Episode 5) (October 26, 2004)
- "Trick or Treat Me Right" (Season 5, Episode 5) (October 26, 2005)

==== Ghosts ====
- "Halloween" (Season 1, Episode 5) (October 28, 2021)
- "Halloween 2: The Ghost of Hetty's Past" (Season 2, Episode 5) (October 27, 2022)
- "Halloween 3: The Guest Who Wouldn't Leave" (Season 3, Episode 4) (March 7, 2024)
- "Halloween 4: The Witch" (Season 4, Episode 3) (October 31, 2024)
- "Halloween 5: The Mummy" (Season 5, Episode 3) (October 30, 2025)
- "Halloween 6: The Mirror" (Season 6, Episode 1-2) (October 29, 2026)

==== Gilligan's Island ====
- Gilligan's Island: "Ghost a Go-Go" (1966)
- Gilligan's Island: "Up at Bat" (1966)

==== Girlfriends ====
- "The Remains of the Date" (Season 1, Episode 6) (October 30, 2000)
- "Trick or Truth" (Season 2, Episode 7) (October 29, 2001)

==== The Goldbergs / Schooled ====
- "Who Are You Going to Telephone?" (October 29, 2013) (Season 1, Episode 6)
- "Family Takes Care of Beverly" (October 29, 2014) (Season 2, Episode 5)
- "Couples Costume" (October 28, 2015) (Season 3, Episode 6)
- "Stefan King" (October 26, 2016) (Season 4, Episode 5)
- "Jackie Likes Star Trek" (November 1, 2017) (Season 5, Episode 6)
- "Mister Knifey-Hands" (October 24, 2018) (Season 6, Episode 5)
- "A 100% True Ghost Story" (October 30, 2019) (Season 7, Episode 6)
- "The Hunt for the Great Albino Pumpkin" (October 27, 2021) (Season 9, Episode 6)
- "DKNY" (October 26, 2022) (Season 10, Episode 6)
- Schooled:
  - "Run, Rick, Run" (October 30, 2019) (Season 2, Episode 6)

==== Grace Under Fire ====
- "Grace Under a Wig" (Season 3, Episode 5) (October 18, 1995)
- "The Ghost and Mrs. Kelly" (Season 4, Episode 6) (October 30, 1996)

==== Growing Pains ====
- "Fool for Love" (Season 4, Episode 1) (October 19, 1988)
- "Happy Halloween: Part 1 and 2" (Season 6, Episode 7 and 8) (October 31, 1990)

==== Hangin' with Mr. Cooper ====
- "Father Fairest" (Season 2, Episode 6) (October 29, 1993)
- "Mo' Money" (Season 3, Episode 6) (October 28, 1994)
- "Halloween" (Season 4, Episode 5) (October 27, 1995)

==== Happy Days ====
- "Haunted" (Season 2, Episode 6) (October 29, 1974)
- "Fonsillectomy" (Season 5, Episode 6) (October 25, 1977)
- "The Evil Eye" (Season 6, Episode 9) (October 31, 1978)

==== Happy Tree Friends ====
- Happy Tree Friends: "Boo Do You Think You Are?" (2000)
- Happy Tree Friends: "Out of Sight, Out of Mime" (2002)
- Happy Tree Friends: "Remains to Be Seen" (2003)
- Happy Tree Friends: "Read 'em and Weep" (2007)
- Happy Tree Friends: "Can't Stop Coffin" (2007)
- Happy Tree Friends: "Peas in a Pod" (2008)
- Happy Tree Friends: "Without a Hitch" (2009)
- Happy Tree Friends: "All In Vein" (2012)
- Happy Tree Friends: "A Vicious Cycle" (2013)

==== Home Economics ====
- "Box of King-Size Candy Bars, $48.99" (October 27, 2021) (Season 2, Episode 6)
- "Novel Signed by Author, $22.19" (October 26, 2022) (Season 3, Episode 6)

==== Home Improvement ====
- "The Haunting of Taylor House" (Season 2, Episode 6) (October 28, 1992)
- "Crazy for You" (Season 3, Episode 6) (October 27, 1993)
- "Borland Ambition" (Season 4, Episode 6) (October 25, 1994)
- "Let Them Eat Cake" (Season 5, Episode 6) (October 31, 1995)
- "I Was a Teenage Taylor" (Season 6, Episode 7) (October 29, 1996)
- "A Night to Dismember" (Season 7, Episode 5) (October 28, 1997)
- "Bewitched" (Season 8, Episode 6) (October 27, 1998)

==== The Honeymooners/The Jackie Gleason Show ====
- "Halloween Party" (Season 2, Episode 5) (October 31, 1953)
- "Halloween Party for the Boss" (Season 3, Episode 6) (October 30, 1954)
- "Curse of the Kramdens" (1966)

==== Hope & Faith ====
- "Hope Has No Faith" (Season 1, Episode 6) (October 31, 2003)
- "Faith Scare-Field" (Season 2, Episode 5) (October 29, 2004)
- "The Halloween Party" (Season 3, Episode 6) (October 28, 2005)

==== How I Met Your Mother ====
- "Slutty Pumpkin" (Season 1, Episode 6) (October 24, 2005)
- "Canning Randy" (Season 6, Episode 7) (November 1, 2010)
- "The Slutty Pumpkin Returns" (Season 7, Episode 8) (October 31, 2011)

==== The Hughleys ====
- "The Curse of the Coyote Man" (Season 2, Episode 6) (October 29, 1999)
- "Scary Hughley" (Season 3, Episode 6) (October 30, 2000)
- "Whatchoo Stalkin' About, Willis?" (Season 4, Episode 8) (October 29, 2001)

==== In the House ====
- "Futile Attraction" (Season 2, Episode 6) (October 23, 1995)
- "The Curse of Hill House" (Season 3, Episode 8) (October 28, 1996)

==== The Jamie Foxx Show ====
- "Kiss & Tell" (Season 1, Episode 8) (October 30, 1996)
- "Misery Loves Company" (Season 2, Episode 8) (October 26, 1997)

==== The Jersey ====
- "Halloween" (Season 2, Episode 6) (October 14, 2000)
- "Halloween 2: The Legend of Henry" (Season 3, Episode 5) (October 27, 2002)

==== Last Man Standing ====
- "Last Halloween Standing" (Season 1, Episode 6) (October 25, 2011)
- "Haunted House" (Season 3, Episode 5) (October 18, 2013)
- "School Merger" (Season 4, Episode 5) (October 24, 2014)
- "Halloween" (Season 5, Episode 6) (October 30, 2015)
- "Trick or Treat" (Season 6, Episode 5) (October 21, 2016)
- "Bride of Prankenstein" (Season 7, Episode 4) (October 19, 2018)

==== Life with Bonnie ====
- "A Day in the Life" (Season 1, Episode 7) (October 29, 2002)
- "The Merry Ole Land of Oz" (Season 2, Episode 6) (October 31, 2003)

==== Living Single ====
- "Trick or Trust" (Season 2, Episode 8) (October 27, 1994)
- "I've Got You Under My Skin" (Season 4, Episode 7) (October 31, 1996)

==== Malcolm & Eddie ====
- "The Boy Who Cried Werewolf" (Season 1, Episode 8) (October 28, 1996)
- "Twisted Sisters" (Season 3, Episode 4) (October 26, 1998)

==== Malcolm in the Middle ====
- "Halloween Approximately" (November 8, 2000) (Season 2, Episode 2)
- "Halloween" (October 28, 2005) (Season 7, Episode 4)

==== Married... with Children ====
- "Take My Wife, Please" (Season 8, Episode 7) (October 25, 1993)
- "Flight of the Bumblebee" (Season 10, Episode 7) (October 30, 1995)

==== Martin ====
- "The Night He Came Home" (Season 1, Episode 10) (October 29, 1992)
- "Boo's in the House" (Season 5, Episode 5) (October 31, 1996)

==== Melissa & Joey ====
- "A Fright in the Attic" (Season 1, Episode 11) (October 19, 2010)
- "Witch Came First" (Season 4, Episode 1) (October 22, 2014)

==== The Middle ====
- "Halloween" (October 27, 2010) (Season 2, Episode 6)
- "Halloween II" (October 26, 2011) (Season 3, Episode 7)
- "Halloween III: The Driving" (October 24, 2012) (Season 4, Episode 6)
- "Halloween IV: The Ghost Story" (October 30, 2013) (Season 5, Episode 5)
- "Halloween V" (October 29, 2014) (Season 6, Episode 5)
- "Halloween VI: Tick Tock Death" (October 28, 2015) (Season 7, Episode 6)
- "Halloween VII: The Heckoning" (October 25, 2016) (Season 8, Episode 3)
- "Halloween VIII: Orson Murder Mystery" (October 24, 2017) (Season 9, Episode 4)

==== Moesha ====
- "Halloween: Part 1: Kim's Revenge" (Season 3, Episode 9) (October 28, 1997)
- "The Nutty Moesha" (Season 6, Episode 7) (October 30, 2000)

==== Modern Family ====
- "Halloween" (October 27, 2010) (Season 2, Episode 6)
- "Open House of Horrors" (October 24, 2012) (Season 4, Episode 5)
- "Halloween 3: AwesomeLand" (Season 6, Episode 6) (October 29, 2014)
- "Halloween 4: The Revenge of Rod Skyhook" (October 26, 2016) (Season 8, Episode 5)
- "It's The Great Pumpkin, Phil Dunphy" (October 25, 2017) (Season 9, Episode 5)
- "Good Grief" (October 24, 2018) (Season 10, Episode 5)
- "The Last Halloween" (October 30, 2019) (Season 11, Episode 5)

==== My Three Sons ====
- "The Ghost Next Door" (Season 3, Episode 6) (October 25, 1962)
- "The Cat Burglars" (Season 11, Episode 6) (October 31, 1970)

==== The Neighbors ====
- "Halloween-ween" (October 24, 2012) (Season 1, Episode 5)
- "Challoweenukah" (October 18, 2013) (Season 2, Episode 5)

==== New Girl ====
- "Halloween" (October 30, 2012) (Season 2, Episode 6)
- "Keaton" (October 22, 2013) (Season 3, Episode 6)

==== Night Court ====
- "Halloween, Too" (Season 3, Episode 5) (October 31, 1985)
- "Halloween II: The Return of Leon" (Season 4, Episode 4) (October 30, 1986)
- "Safe" (Season 5, Episode 5) (October 29, 1987)
- "Come Back to the Five and Dime, Stephen King, Stephen King" (Season 7, Episode 4) (October 25, 1989)
- "Death Takes a Halloween" (Season 8, Episode 5) (October 26, 1990)

==== The Office (U.S.) ====
- "Halloween" (October 18, 2005) (Season 2, Episode 5)
- "Employee Transfer" (October 30, 2008) (Season 5, Episode 6)
- "Koi Pond" (October 29, 2009) (Season 6, Episode 8)
- "Costume Contest" (October 28, 2010) (Season 7, Episode 6)
- "Spooked" (October 27, 2011) (Season 8, Episode 5)
- "Here Comes Treble" (October 25, 2012) (Season 9, Episode 5)

==== One on One ====
- "Phantom Menace" (Season 1, Episode 8) (October 29, 2001)
- "Manic Monday" (Season 4, Episode 6) (October 25, 2004)
- "Where's My Yemmy?" (Season 5, Episode 6) (October 24, 2005)

==== Parks and Recreation ====
- "Greg Pikitis" (October 29, 2009) (Season 2, Episode 7)
- "Meet 'n' Greet" (October 27, 2011) (Season 4, Episode 5)
- "Halloween Surprise" (October 25, 2012) (Season 5, Episode 5)
- "Recall Vote" (November 14, 2013) (Season 6, Episode 7)

==== Perfect Strangers ====
- "Aliens" (Season 4, Episode 3) (October 28, 1988)
- "Fright Night" (Season 7, Episode 6) (October 25, 1991)

==== Punky Brewster ====
- "The Perils of Punky (Parts 1 and 2)" (Season 2, Episode 6 and 7) (October 27, 1985)
- "Love Thy Neighbor" (Season 2, Episode 10) (November 17, 1985)

==== Raising Hope ====
- "Happy Halloween" (October 26, 2010) (Season 1, Episode 5)
- "Don't Ask, Don't Tell Me What to Do" (October 30, 2012) (Season 3, Episode 5)

==== Reba ====
- "The Ghost and Mrs. H" (Season 3, Episode 8) (October 31, 2003)
- "Best Lil' Haunted House in Texas" (Season 5, Episode 6) (October 28, 2005)

==== Rodney ====
- "Halloween" (Season 1, Episode 6) (October 26, 2004)
- "Halloween and Javier" (Season 2, Episode 4) (November 1, 2005)

==== Roseanne / The Conners ====
Roseanne

- "BOO!" (Season 2, Episode 7) (October 31, 1989)
- "Trick or Treat" (Season 3, Episode 7) (October 30, 1990)
- "Trick Me Up, Trick Me Down" (Season 4, Episode 6) (October 29, 1991)
- "Halloween IV" (Season 5, Episode 7) (October 27, 1992)
- "Halloween V" (Season 6, Episode 6) (October 26, 1993)
- "Skeleton in the Closet" (Season 7, Episode 6) (October 26, 1994)
- "Halloween: the Final Chapter" (Season 8, Episode 5) (October 31, 1995)
- "Satan, Darling" (Season 9, Episode 7) (October 29, 1996)

The Conners

- "There Won't Be Blood" (Season 1, Episode 3) (October 30, 2018)
- "Nightmare on Lunch Box Street" (Season 2, Episode 5) (October 29, 2019)
- "Halloween and the Election vs. The Pandemic" (Season 3, Episode 2) (October 28, 2020)
- "Peter Pan, The Backup Plan, Adventures in Babysitting, and a River Runs Through It" (Season 4, Episode 5) (October 27, 2021)
- "Book Bans and Guillotine Hands" (Season 5, Episode 6) (October 26, 2022)

==== Sabrina the Teenage Witch ====
- "A Halloween Story" (Season 1, Episode 5) (October 25, 1996)
- "A River of Candy Corn Runs Through It" (Season 2, Episode 7) (October 31, 1997)
- "Good Will Haunting" (Season 3, Episode 6) (October 30, 1998)
- "The Phantom Menace" (Season 4, Episode 6) (October 29, 1999)
- "The Halloween Scene" (Season 5, Episode 6) (October 27, 2000)
- "Murder on the Halloween Express" (Season 6, Episode 6) (October 26, 2001)

==== Scrubs / Scrubs ====
- "My Big Brother" (October 31, 2002) (Season 2, Episode 6)
- "My Halloween" (October 28, 2026) (Season 2, Episode 6)

==== Single Parents ====
- "Politician, Freemason, Scientist, Humorist and Diplomat, Ben Franklin" (October 24, 2018) (Season 1, Episode 5)
- "Welcome to Hell, Sickos!" (October 30, 2019) (Season 2, Episode 6)

==== Speechless ====
- "H-A-L-- HALLOWEEN" (October 26, 2016) (Season 1, Episode 5)
- "N-I-- NIGHTMARES ON D-I-- DIMEO S-STREET" (October 25, 2017) (Season 2, Episode 5)
- "I-N-- INTO THE W-O-- WOODS" (October 19, 2018) (Season 3, Episode 3)

==== Step by Step ====
- "Something Wild" (Season 4, Episode 6) (October 28, 1994)
- "Dream Lover" (Season 7, Episode 7) (October 24, 1997)

==== Suburgatory ====
- "Halloween" (October 26, 2011) (Season 1, Episode 5)
- "The Witch of East Chatswin" (October 24, 2012) (Season 2, Episode 2)

==== Suddenly Susan ====
- "A Funny Thing Happened on the Way to Susan's Party " (Season 3, Episode 5) (October 26, 1998)
- "Halloween" (Season 4, Episode 5) (October 18, 1999)

==== Superstore ====
- "Halloween Theft" (October 27, 2016) (Season 2, Episode 7)
- "Sal's Dead" (October 26, 2017) (Season 3, Episode 5)
- "Costume Competition" (October 25, 2018) (Season 4, Episode 4)
- "Trick-or-Treat" (October 31, 2019) (Season 5, Episode 6)

==== That '70s Show ====
- "Halloween" (Season 2, Episode 5) (October 26, 1999)
- "Too Old to Trick or Treat, Too Young to Die" (Season 3, Episode 4) (October 31, 2000)

==== Two and a Half Men ====
- "Hi, Mr. Horned One" (Season 3, Episode 6) (October 24, 2005)
- "The Ol' Mexican Spinach" (Season 12, Episode 1) (October 30, 2014)

==== Two Guys and a Girl ====
- "Two Guys, a Girl and a Psycho Halloween" (Season 2, Episode 6) (October 28, 1998)
- "Halloween 2: Mind Over Body" (Season 3, Episode 6) (October 27, 1999)
- "Satanic Curses" (Season 4, Episode 4) (October 27, 2000)

==== What I Like About You ====
- "Ghost of a Chance" (Season 3, Episode 7) (October 29, 2004)
- "Halloween" (Season 4, Episode 6) (October 28, 2005)

==== Will & Grace ====
- "Boo! Humbug" (Season 1, Episode 5) (October 26, 1998)
- "It's the Gay Pumpkin, Charlie Brown" (Season 5, Episode 5) (October 31, 2002)

=== Animated Sitcoms ===
==== American Dad! ====
- "Best Little Horror House in Langley Falls" (Season 6, Episode 3) (November 7, 2010)
- "Poltergasm" (Season 10, Episode 10) (October 6, 2013)
- "Steve's Franken Out" (Season 18, Episode 22) (October 25, 2021)
- "Z.O.I.N.C.S." (Season 20, Episode 15) (October 30, 2023)

==== Beavis and Butt-head ====
- "Bungholio: Lord of the Harvest" a.k.a. "Butt-O-Ween" (Season 6, Episode 1) (October 31, 1995)

==== Big Mouth ====
- "Horrority House" (Season 4, Episode 9) (2020)

==== Bless the Harts ====
- "Cremains of the Day" (Season 1, Episode 4) (October 20, 2019)
- "Dead Mall" (Season 2, Episode 4) (November 1, 2020)

==== Bob's Burgers ====
- "Full Bars" (Season 3, Episode 2) (October 7, 2012)
- "Fort Night" (Season 4, Episode 2) (October 6, 2013)
- "Tina and the Real Ghost" (Season 5, Episode 2) (November 2, 2014)
- "The Hauntening" (Season 6, Episode 3) (October 18, 2015)
- "Teen-a Witch" (Season 7, Episode 3) (October 23, 2016)
- "The Wolf of Wharf Street" (Season 8, Episode 3) (October 22, 2017)
- "Nightmare on Ocean Avenue Street" (Season 9, Episode 4) (October 21, 2018)
- "Pig Trouble in Little Tina" (Season 10, Episode 4) (October 20, 2019)
- "Heartbreak Hotel-oween" (Season 11, Episode 4) (November 1, 2020)
- "The Pumpkinening" (Season 12, Episode 3) (October 10, 2021)
- "Apple Gore-chard! (But Not Gory)" (Season 13, Episode 6) (October 30, 2022)
- "The Twinnening" (Season 16, Episode 3) (October 19, 2025)

==== Celebrity Deathmatch ====
- "Halloween Episode I" (Season 2, Episode 19) (October 28, 1999)
- "Halloween Episode II"(Season 3, Episode 17) (October 29. 2000)

==== Chicago Party Aunt ====
- "Halloweener Circle" (2021)

==== The Cleveland Show ====
- "It's the Great Pancake, Cleveland Brown" (Season 2, Episode 4) (November 7, 2010)
- "Nightmare on Grace Street" (Season 3, Episode 3) (October 30, 2011)
- "Escape from Goochland" (Season 4, Episode 1) (October 7, 2012)

==== Corner Gas Animated ====
- "Haunt for Dread October" (Season 4, Episode 12) (October 25, 2021)

==== Daria ====
- "Legends of the Mall" (Season 4, Episode 10) (2000)

==== Downtown ====
- "Trip or Treat" (Season 1, Episode 13) (November 8, 1999)

==== Duncanville ====
- "Witch Day" (Season 1, Episode 4) (2020)
- "Witch Day 2" (Season 2, Episode 12) (2021)
- "Witch Day 3" (Season 3, Episode 12) (October 18, 2022)

==== Everybody Still Hates Chris ====
- "Everybody Still Hates Halloween" (Season 1, Episode 6) (October 9, 2024)

==== F is for Family ====
- "'F' is for Halloween" (Season 1, Episode 4) (2015)

==== Family Guy ====
- "Halloween on Spooner Street" (Season 9, Episode 4) (November 7, 2010)
- "Quagmire's Quagmire" (Season 12, Episode 3) (November 3, 2013)
- "Peternormal Activity" (Season 14, Episode 14) (October 25, 2015)
- "Must Love Dogs" (Season 20, Episode 3) (October 10, 2021)
- "Happy Holo-ween" (Season 21, Episode 6) (October 30, 2022)
- "Peter, Peter, Pumpkin Cheater" (Season 23, Hulu Special) (October 14, 2024)
- "A Little Fright Music" (Season 24, Hulu Special) (October 6, 2025)
- "Happy Hell-o-ween" (Hulu Special) (October 5, 2026)

==== Glenn Martin, DDS ====
- "Halloween Hangover" (Season 1, Episode 12) (October 26, 2009)

==== The Great North ====
- "The Yawn of the Dead Adventure" (Season 2, Episode 3) (October 10, 2021)
- "Blood Actually Adventure" (Season 3, Episode 6) (October 30, 2022)

==== Home Movies ====
- "Coffins and Cradles" (Season 3, Episode 13) (2003)

==== Inside Job ====
- "Rontagion" (2022)

==== King of the Hill ====
- "Hilloween" (Season 2, Episode 4) (October 26, 1997)
- "Pigmalion" (Season 7, Episode 9) (2003)

==== Legends of Chamberlain Heights ====
- "Exclusive - Top Six Pickup Lines for Swalloween"

==== The Simpsons ====
- "Treehouse of Horror I" (Season 2, Episode 3) (October 25, 1990)
- "Treehouse of Horror II" (Season 3, Episode 7) (October 31, 1991)
- "Treehouse of Horror III" (Season 4, Episode 5) (October 29, 1992)
- "Treehouse of Horror IV" (Season 5, Episode 5) (October 28, 1993)
- "Treehouse of Horror V" (Season 6, Episode 6) (October 30, 1994)
- "Treehouse of Horror VI" (Season 7, Episode 6) (October 29, 1995)
- "Treehouse of Horror VII" (Season 8, Episode 1) (October 27, 1996)
- "Treehouse of Horror VIII" (Season 9, Episode 4) (October 26, 1997)
- "Treehouse of Horror IX" (Season 10, Episode 4) (October 25, 1998)
- "Treehouse of Horror X" (Season 11, Episode 4) (October 31, 1999)
- "Treehouse of Horror XI" (Season 12, Episode 1) (November 1, 2000)
- "Treehouse of Horror XII" (Season 13, Episode 1) (November 6, 2001)
- "Treehouse of Horror XIII" (Season 14, Episode 1) (November 3, 2002)
- "Treehouse of Horror XIV" (Season 15, Episode 1) (November 2, 2003)
- "Treehouse of Horror XV" (Season 16, Episode 1) (November 7, 2004)
- "Treehouse of Horror XVI" (Season 17, Episode 4) (November 6, 2005)
- "Treehouse of Horror XVII" (Season 18, Episode 4) (November 5, 2006)
- "Treehouse of Horror XVIII" (Season 19, Episode 5) (November 4, 2007)
- "Treehouse of Horror XIX" (Season 20, Episode 4) (November 2, 2008)
- "Treehouse of Horror XX" (Season 21, Episode 4) (October 18, 2009)
- "Treehouse of Horror XXI" (Season 22, Episode 4) (November 7, 2010)
- "Treehouse of Horror XXII" (Season 23, Episode 3) (October 30, 2011)
- "Treehouse of Horror XXIII" (Season 24, Episode 2) (October 7, 2012)
- "Treehouse of Horror XXIV" (Season 25, Episode 2) (October 6, 2013)
- "Treehouse of Horror XXV" (Season 26, Episode 4) (October 19, 2014)
- "Halloween of Horror" (Season 27, Episode 5) (October 18, 2015)
- "Treehouse of Horror XXVI" (Season 27, Episode 5) (October 25, 2015)
- "Treehouse of Horror XXVII" (Season 28, Episode 4) (October 16, 2016)
- "Treehouse of Horror XXVIII" (Season 29, Episode 4) (October 22, 2017)
- "Treehouse of Horror XXIX" (Season 30, Episode 4) (October 21, 2018)
- "Treehouse of Horror XXX" (Season 31, Episode 4) (October 20, 2019)
- "Treehouse of Horror XXXI" (Season 32, Episode 4) (November 1, 2020)
- "Treehouse of Horror XXXII" (Season 33, Episode 3) (October 10, 2021)
- "Not It" (Season 34, Episode 5) (October 23, 2022)
- "Treehouse of Horror XXXIII" (Season 34, Episode 6) (October 30, 2022)
- "Treehouse of Horror XXXIV" (Season 35, Episode 5) (November 5, 2023)
- "Treehouse of Horror XXXV" (Season 36, Episode 5) (November 3, 2024)
- "Treehouse of Horror Presents: Simpsons Wicked This Way Comes" (Season 36, Episode 7) (November 24, 2024)
- "Treehouse of Horror XXXVI" (Season 37, Episode 3) (October 19, 2025)
- "Treehouse of Horror Presents: The Revengening" (Season 38, Episode 3) (October 18, 2026)
- "Treehouse of Horror XXXVII" (Season 38, Episode 4) (October 25, 2026)

==== Solar Opposites ====
- "A Sinister Halloween Scary Opposites Solar Special" (Season 3, Television special) (October 3, 2022)
- "The Hunt for Brown October" (Season 5, Television special) (October 5, 2024)

==== South Park ====
- "Pinkeye" (Season 1, Episode 7) (October 29, 1997)
- "Spookyfish" (Season 2, Episode 15) (October 28, 1998)
- "Korn's Groovy Pirate Ghost Mystery" (Season 3, Episode 10) (October 27, 1999)
- "Hell on Earth 2006" (Season 10, Episode 11) (October 25, 2006)
- "A Nightmare on Face Time" (Season 16, Episode 12) (October 24, 2012)
- "Goth Kids 3: Dawn of the Posers" (Season 17, Episode 4) (October 23, 2013)
- "Sons a Witches" (Season 21, Episode 6) (October 25, 2017)
- "The Scoots" (Season 22, Episode 5) (October 31, 2018)
- "Tegridy Farms Halloween Special" (Season 23, Episode 5) (October 30, 2019)
- "The Woman in the Hat" (Season 28, Episode 2) (October 31, 2025)

==== SuperMansion ====
- "Drag Me to Halloween" (Television special) (October 5, 2017)

==== Velma ====
- "This Halloween Needs To Be More Special!" (Television special) (October 3, 2024)

=== Children and family ===
- ABC Weekend Special:
  - "Soup and Me" (1978)
- Ace Ventura: Pet Detective:
  - "Witch's Brew" (1999)
- The Addams Family
  - "Puttergeist" (1992)
- Agent Binky: Pets of the Universe
  - "Hairy and Scary" / "Tricky Treat Hunt" (2022)
- A Little Curious:
  - Work, Play, Skip (2000)
  - Balance, Skip, Rock (2000)
- ALF Tales
  - "The Legend of Sleepy Hollow" (1988)
- The Alvin Show:
  - "Haunted House" (1962)
- Alvin and the Chipmunks:
  - "The Mystery of Seville Manor" (1987)
  - "Babysitter Fright Night" (1988)
- Alvinnn!!! and the Chipmunks
  - "Switch Witch" (2016)
- Angry Birds Stella
  - "Night of the Bling" (2015)
- Angry Birds: Summer Madness:
  - "Hollow-Weenie" (2022)
- Angry Birds Toons:
  - "Night of the Living Pork" (2013)
  - "Sweets of Doom" (2014)
  - "Porcula" (2015)
- Angela Anaconda
  - "Boo Who" / The Haunting of Angela Anaconda (2000)
- Archie's Weird Mysteries
  - "Halloween of Horror" (2000)
- Arthur:
  - "The Fright Stuff" (1999)
  - "Hic or Treat" (2007)
  - "Arthur and the Haunted Treehouse" (2017)
- The Bad Guys: Haunted Heist (2024)
- Bananas in Pyjamas
  - "The Trickisaurus" (2011)
  - "Halloween" (2012)
- Barney & Friends:
  - Barney's Halloween Party (1998)
  - Guess Who? / Sweet Treats (2007)
- The Batman: Grundy's Night (2005)
- Beetlejuice:
  - "Laugh of the Party" (1989)
  - "Bewitched, Bothered & Beetlejuiced" (1990)
- The Berenstain Bears
  - "Trick-or-Treat" (2003)
- Best Foot Forward
  - "Halloween" (2022)
- Beverly Hills Teens
  - "Halloween in the Hills" (1987)
- Betty Boop: Betty Boop's Hallowe'en Party (1933)
- The Biskitts
  - "A Biskitt Halloween" (1983)
- Bobby's World: Night of the Living Pumpkin (1990)
- The Boss Baby: Back in Business
  - "Halloween" (2020)
- Boy Girl Dog Cat Mouse Cheese
  - "Greb Nefual E Neg" (2019)
- The Busy World of Richard Scarry
  - "The First Halloween Ever" (1997)
- Caillou
  - "Caillou Loves Halloween" (1999)
  - "Fall Is in the Air" (2000)
  - "Caillou's Halloween Costume" (2006)
- Calimero
  - "Scared Stiff" (2013)
- Casper the Friendly Ghost: To Boo or Not to Boo (1951)
- Casper's Halloween Special (1979)
- The Cat in the Hat Knows a Lot About That:
  - "Aye Aye" (2011)
  - "Trick or Treat" (2011)
  - "The Cat in the Hat Knows a Lot About Halloween!" (2016)
- The Chica Show
  - "A Halloween Adventure" (2014)
- CHiPs
  - "Trick or Trick" (1978)
- Class of the Titans
  - "See You at the Crossroads" (2006)
- Claymation Comedy of Horrors (1991)
- "Corn and Peg"
  - "The Haunted Barn"
  - "Trick or Squeak"
- Curious George
  - "A Halloween Boo-Fest" (2013)
  - "Tale of the Frightening Flapjacks/Happy Yelloween" (2022)
- Cyberchase:
  - "Castleblanca" (2002)
  - Trick or Treat (2003)
  - The Halloween Howl (2006)
  - Watts of Halloween Trouble (2017)
- D-TV
  - "Monster Hits" (1987)
- The Daltons
  - "Funny Fangs Dalton" (2015)
- Davey and Goliath
  - "Halloween Who-Dun-It" (1967)
- The David S. Pumpkins Halloween Special (2017)
- Dinosaurs:
  - When Food Goes Bad (1991)
  - Little Boy Boo (1992)
- Dinosaur Train:
  - Night Train / Fossil Fred (2009)
  - Haunted Roundhouse / Big Pond Pumpkin Patch (2011)
- DragonflyTV
  - "DragonflyTV’s First Annual Halloween Special" (2002)
  - "DragonflyTV’s Second Annual Halloween Special" (2003)
  - "DragonflyTV’s Third Annual Halloween Special" (2004)
  - "DragonflyTV’s Fourth Annual Halloween Special" (2005)
  - "DragonflyTV’s Fifth Annual Halloween Special" (2006)
  - "A DragonflyTV Halloween of Science" (2007)
  - "DragonflyTV’s Last Halloween" (2008)
- The Dog Who Saved Halloween (2011)
- The Doozers
  - "Spookypalooza" (2014)
- Dot.
  - "Scaremaster 2.0" / Ghoul Away (2016)
- Dragon
  - "Dragon's Fall Collection" / Dragon's Halloween (2006)
- Duck & Goose
  - "Go Trick or Treating" (2022)
- Early Edition
  - "Halloween" (1998)
- Eek! The Cat
  - "HallowEek" (1992)
- Ella the Elephant
  - "Ella's Special Delivery" / Frankie's Perfect Pumpkin (2014)
- Eloise: The Animated Series
  - "Eloise's Rawther Unusual Halloween" (2006)
- Extreme Dinosaurs
  - "Night of the Living Pumpkins" (1997)
- The Fat Albert Halloween Special (1977)
- Felix the Cat: "Switches Witches" (1927)
- Festival of Family Classics
  - "Jack O' Lantern" (1972)
- Fetch! with Ruff Ruffman
  - "Ruffman Manor Is Haunted" (2010)
- For Better or for Worse
  - "The Good-for-Nothing" (1993)
- For Real
  - "Halloween" (2020)
- Fred 2: Night of the Living Fred (2011)
- The Friendly Giant
  - "Halloween Concert" (1979)
- Gadget and the Gadgetinis
  - "Trick or Trap" (2001)
- The Garfield Show
  - "Orange and Black" (2009)
- Garfield's Halloween Adventure (1985/CBS)
- Gary Larson's Tales from the Far Side (1994)
- Get Ace
  - "Halloween Hijinks"/Dawn of the Dumb (2014)
- Go, Dog. Go!
  - "Trick or Thief" / "Meow-Lo-Ween" (2023)
- The Great Bear Scare (1983)
- Growing Pains
  - "Happy Halloween" (1990)
- Halloween Is Grinch Night (1977)
- The Halloween That Almost Wasn't (1979)
- The Halloween Tree (1993)
- Hello, Jack! The Kindness Show:
  - "Jack’s Hallowonderful" (2022)
- The Haunting of Barney Palmer (1987)
- Harvey Girls Forever!:
  - "Harveyween" (2018)
  - "Scare Bud" (2020)
  - "All Harveys Eve" (2020)
- The Healing Powers of Dude: "House Party of Horrors" (2020)
- Helpsters
  - "Helpsters Halloween / Storyteller Sophia" (2020)
- Home: Adventures with Tip & Oh
  - "Kung Boov" / The Werewolves of Chicago (2016)
- If You Give a Mouse a Cookie
  - "If You Give a Mouse a Pumpkin" (2019)
- Interrupting Chicken
  - "Dr. Chickenstein" / "The Sorcerer’s Thesaurus" (2022)
- It's the Great Pumpkin, Charlie Brown (1966/CBS)
- Jackie Chan Adventures:
  - "Chi of the Vampire" (2002)
  - "Fright Fight Night" (2003)
- Jacob Two-Two
  - "Jacob Two-Two and the Halloween Hullabaloo" (2005)
- Jelly Jamm:
  - "The Monster of Boredom" (2013)
- Jellystone!:
  - "Spell Book" (2021)
- Jem
  - "Trick or Techrat" (1987)
- The Jetsons: Haunted Halloween (1985)
- Justin Time
  - "Cleopatra's Cat" (2011)
  - "The Count's Creepy Critters" (2016)
- Just Add Magic: "Just Add Halloween" (2016)
- Kate & Mim-Mim:
  - "Lil' Boo" (2016)
- Kindergarten (TV series): "A New Season" (2001)
- Lassie:
  - "The Witch" (1955)
  - Haunted House (1957)
  - "The UNICEF Story" (1959)
- The Last Halloween (1991)
- Life with Louie: Louie's Harrowing Halloween (1997)
- Little Ellen: "Happy Elloween" (2021)
- Little Lunch
  - "The Halloween Horror Story" (2016)
- The Littles:
  - "The Big Scare" (1983)
  - "The Littles' Halloween" (1984)
- The Little Lulu Show:
  - "The Bogeyman" (1996)
  - "The Little Girl Who Never Heard of Ghosts" (1998)
- The Little Rascals
  - "Fright Night" (1982)
- Little Shop:
  - "Untitled Halloween Story" (1991)
- Llama Llama: "Llama Llama Trick or Treat" (2018)
- Madagascar: A Little Wild
  - "A Fang-tastic Halloween" (2020)
- Mad Mad Mad Monsters (1972)
- Madeline:
  - "Madeline and the Costume Party" (1993)
  - "Madeline and the Haunted Castle" (1995)
  - "Madeline's Halloween & Madeline and the Spider Lady" (2000)
- * Marvin the Tap-Dancing Horse:
  - "Elizabeth and the Haunted House/Marvin Horses Around "
- The Magic School Bus:
  - "Magic School Bus in the Haunted House" (1994)
  - "Magic School Bus Going Batty " (1995)
- Martin Mystery:
  - "Haunting of the Blackwater" (2004)
  - "The Vampire Returns" (2004)
  - "Curse of the Necklace" (2004)
- The Mask: All Hallow's Eve (1995)
- Men in Black: The Series: The Jack O' Lantern Syndrome (1998)
- Michael Jackson's Halloween (2017/CBS)
- Miss BG
  - "Party Contest; Alien Nightmares" (2005)
- Monster Buster Club
  - "Trick or Treat...or Alien?" (2008)
- Monster High: Ghouls Rule! (2012)
- Monster Mash (2000)
- The Mouse Factory
  - "Spooks and Magic" (1972)
  - The Dark (2008)
- The Mr. Peabody & Sherman Show: Spooktacular/Nicolas-Joseph Cugnot (2016)
- The Muppet Show:
  - "Vincent Price" (1976)
  - "Alice Cooper" (1978)
  - "Alan Arkin" (1980)
- Nature Cat
  - "Runaway Pumpkin" (2016)
  - "Dr. Pumpkinstein" (2023)
- Ned's Newt
  - "Home Alone with Frank" (1997)
- The New Adventures of Madeline
  - "Madeline and the Haunted Castle" (1995)
- The New Lassie
  - "Halloween" (1989)
- The New Misadventures of Ichabod Crane (1979)
- The New Worst Witch
  - "Trick or Treat" (2005)
- The Night of the Headless Horseman (1999)
- Oggy and the Cockroaches
  - "The Ghost-Hunter" (1998)
  - "Scaredy Cat" (2013)
- Pac-Man Halloween Special (1982)
- Pac-Man and the Ghostly Adventures
  - "A Berry Scary Night" (2013)
  - "The Shadow of the Were-Pac" (2014)
  - "Pac's Very Scary Halloween" (2015)
- Pajanimals
  - "Spooky Costumes" (2012)
- PaRappa the Rapper (TV series)
  - "Are You Perhaps Scared?" (2001)
- Pat the Dog
  - "Trick or Treat Terror" (2017)
- Pearlie
  - "Hideous Halloween" (2009)
- Piggy Tales:
  - "Scared Sick" (2016)
  - "Shadow Pig" (2016)
  - "Pumpkin Head" (2016)
  - "Scary Fog" (2017)
  - "Ghost Hog" (2017)
- Pinky Dinky Doo
  - "Tyler Dinky Doo's Big Boo"
- Pixel Pinkie:
  - "Dare To Be Scared" (2009)
  - "Trick or Treat" (2009)
  - "Double Trouble" (2012)
- Popeye the Sailor Man: "Fright to the Finish" (1954)
- Pucca
  - "Them Bones" (2006)
  - "Trick or Treat" (2019)
- A Pumpkin Full of Nonsense (1985)
- Raggedy Ann and Andy in The Pumpkin Who Couldn't Smile (1979)
- The Real Ghostbusters:
  - When Halloween Was Forever (1986)
  - Halloween II 1/2 (1987)
  - The Halloween Door (1989)
  - Deja Boo (1990)
- Ready Jet Go:
  - "Jet's First Halloween" (2016)
  - "That's One Gigantic Pumpkin, Jet Propulsion!" (2018)
- ReBoot
  - "To Mend and Defend" (1998)
- Rolie Polie Olie
  - "The Legend of Spookie Ookie / Oooh, Scary / Zowie, Queen of the Pumpkins" (1999)
- Rude Dog and the Dweebs
  - "War of the Dweebs" (1989)
- Sabrina: The Animated Series
  - "Nothin' Says Lovin' Like Something from a Coven" (1999)
- The Save-Ums!:
  - "Monkey Up a Tree!/It's Halloween!" (2003)
- Scary Godmother: Halloween Spooktakular (2003)
- Scary Godmother: The Revenge of Jimmy (2005)
- Schoolhouse Rock!
  - "Them Not-So-Dry Bones" (1979)
- Sesame Street:
  - "Episode 0657: Scary Street" (1974)
  - "Elmo Says Boo" (1997)
  - "A Magical Halloween Adventure" (2004)
  - "Episode 4635: Halloween" (2016) (This episode was replaced by Snazzy Society in Australia)
- Sharkdog
  - "Sharkdog's Fintastic Halloween" (2021)
- Sharky's Friends: Spooky Special (2008)
- SheZow
  - Vampire Cats In Zombie Town (2013)
- Shining Time Station:
  - "Scare Dares" (1991)
- "Scared Shrekless" (2010)
- Scaredy Cats (2021)
  - "Which Witch Is Which?" (2021)
  - "The Legend of the Witches of Winding Way" (2021)
  - "The Halloween Howl" (2021)
- Sid the Science Kid
  - "Halloween Spooky Science Special" (2011)
- Skinner Boys: Guardians of the Lost Secrets
  - "Dragon's Breath" (2015)
- The Smurfs
  - "All Hallows Eve" / The Littlest Witch (1983)
- The Smurfs: The Legend of Smurfy Hollow (2013)
- The Snoopy Show: The Curse of a Fuzzy Face (2021)
- Snorks: A Willie Scary Shalloween (1987)
- Space Racers
  - "Haunted Asteroid" (2016)
- Space Goofs
  - "Spook to Rent" (1998)
  - "Count Gracula" (1998)
- The Spectacular Spider-Man
  - "The Uncertainty Principle" (2008)
- Spirit Riding Free
  - "Lucky and the Ghostly Gotcha!" (2018)
- Spookley the Square Pumpkin (2004)
- Spooky Bats and Scaredy Cats (2009)
- Stella and Sam
  - "Felix the Ghost" / Monster Misunderstanding (2013)
- The Strange Chores
  - "Witch Watch" (2019)
  - "Stop the Monster Slime" (2019)
  - "Don't Trick or Tweet" (2019)
- Strawberry Shortcake: Berry in the Big City
  - "Ghost of Cupcakes Past" (2021)
  - "Fright Fall" (2021)
  - "Scary-Oke" (2022)
  - "Save the Pumpkins" (2022)
  - "The House on Scary Berry Lane" (2023)
  - "Trick and Treat" (2023)
  - "Orange's Slumber Party" (2023)
- Stickin' Around
  - "The Ghost and Mr. Coffin" (1998)
- Stillwater
  - "Ghost Story" (2021)
- Team Galaxy
  - "Trick or Treat" (2008)
- Teenage Mutant Ninja Turtles
  - "Super Irma" (1992)
- Teenage Mutant Ninja Turtles
  - "All Hallows Thieves" (2005)
- Tennessee Tuxedo and His Tales
  - "Goblins Will Get You" (1965)
- Theodore Tugboat:
  - "George's Ghost" (1994)
  - "Theodore and the Haunted Tugboat" (1998)
- The Tom and Jerry Comedy Show
  - "Farewell, Sweet Mouse" (1980)
- Tom & Jerry Halloween Special (1987)
- Tom and Jerry (Van Beuren): Wot a Night (1931)
- Trucktown: "The Great Gravelly Ghost Truck" (2014)
- The Twisted Tales of Felix the Cat
  - "Order of the Black Cats" (1995)
- Under the Umbrella Tree
  - "Halloween Under the Umbrella Tree" (1991)
- Where's Chicky? (2014 TV series)
  - The Pinball Machine (2014)
  - The Drone (2021)
  - The Jack-O-Lantern (2021)
  - The Magic Cauldron (2021)
  - Bran Castle (2021)
- Where's Waldo? (2019 TV series)
  - "A Wanderer's Christmas" (2019)
  - "Where's Woof?" (2020)
- Where on Earth Is Carmen Sandiego?
  - "Trick or Treat?" (1996)
- The Wiggles: Wiggle and Learn (2024 YouTube Series)
  - "Halloween" (2024)
- Wingin' It
  - "Fright Club" (2011)
- Wishbone
  - "Frankenbone" (1995)
  - "Halloween Hound: The Legend of Creepy Collars: Part 1" (1997)
  - "Halloween Hound: The Legend of Creepy Collars: Part 2" (1997)
- W.I.T.C.H.
  - "W is for Witch" (2006)
- Witches in Stitches (1997)
- The Witch Who Turned Pink (1989)
- Witch's Night Out (1978)
- The Woody Woodpecker Show
  - "Spook-a-Nanny" (1964)
- Woody Woodpecker:
  - "Haunted Hijinks" (2018)
- WordGirl
  - "Tobey's Trick and Treats" (2009)
- WordWorld
  - "A Kooky Spooky Halloween" / Sheep's Halloween Costume (2008)
- The Worst Witch (1986)
- The Worst Witch
  - "A Mean Halloween" (1998)
- X-Men: The Animated Series
  - "Bloodlines" (1996)
- Yabba-Dabba Dinosaurs
  - "Dawn of the Disposals" (2021)
- Zou
  - "A Halloween Hunt" (2013)

==== Cartoon Network/Boomerang/Discovery Family ====
- 6teen:
  - "Boo, Dude!" (2005)
  - "Dude of the Living Dead" (2005)
- Almost Naked Animals:
  - "Howieween/Hotel of Horrors" (2011)
- The Amazing World of Gumball:
  - "Halloween" (2012)
  - "The Mirror" (2014)
  - "The Scam" (2016)
  - "The Ghouls" (2018)
  - "The Gumball Chronicles: The Curse of Elmore" (Season 1, Episode 1) (2020)
- Apple & Onion:
  - "The Eater" (2020)
  - "Eyesore At Sunset" (2021)
- Atomic Betty:
  - "When Worlds Collide/The Ghost Ship of Aberdeffia" (2004)
- Batwheels: "Pumpkin Panic" (2025)
- Ben 10:
  - "Ghostfreaked Out" (2006)
  - "The Return" (2007)
  - "Be Afraid of the Dark" (2007)
- Ben 10: Alien Force:
  - "Ghost Town" (2009)
- Ben 10: Omniverse:
  - "Rad Monster Party" (2014)
  - "Charmed, I'm Sure" (2014)
  - "The Vampire Strikes Back" (2014)
- Ben 10:
  - "Scared Silly" (2017)
  - "Beware of the Scare-Crow" (2019)
- Bugs Bunny Builders: "Spellbound" (2025)
- ‘’Be Cool, Scooby-Doo!’’:
  - “Halloween” (2017)
- Camp Lazlo:
  - "Hallobeanies" (2005)
- Casper's Scare School:
  - "Boo!" (2009)
- Chowder:
  - "The Spookiest House in Marzipan/The Poultry Geist" (2009)
  - "The Birthday Suits" (2009)
- Clarence:
  - "Belson's Sleepover" (2014)
  - "Spooky Boo!" (2015)
  - "A Nightmare on Aberdale Street: Balance's Revenge" (2017)
- Codename: Kids Next Door:
  - "Operation: G.H.O.S.T." (2003)
  - "Operation: T.R.I.C.K.Y." (2004)
- Cow and Chicken:
  - "Halloween with Dead Ghost, Coast to Coast" (1998)
- Craig of the Creek:
  - "The Haunted Dollhouse" (2019)
  - "Trick or Creek" (2020)
  - "Legend of the Library" (2021)
- Dan Vs.:
  - The Wolf-Man" (Season 1, Episode 2) (2011)
- DC Super Hero Girls:
  - "#SoulSisters" (2019)
  - "#SchoolGhoul" (2020)
  - "#NightmareInGotham" (2021)
- Dexter's Laboratory:
  - "Monstory" (Season 1, Episode 13c) (1997)
  - "Filet of Soul" (1997)
  - "Scare Tactics" (2002)
- Ed, Edd n Eddy:
  - Ed Edd n Eddy's Boo Haw Haw (2005)
- Foster's Home for Imaginary Friends:
  - "Bloooo" (2004)
  - "Nightmare on Wilson Way" (2007)
- George of the Jungle:
  - "Frankengeorge/Afraid of Nothing" (2007)
- The Grim Adventures of Billy & Mandy:
  - "Grim or Gregory?" (2002)
  - Billy & Mandy's Jacked-Up Halloween" (2003)
  - Underfist: Halloween Bash (2008)
- Grojband:
  - "Dance of the Dead" (2013)
- The High Fructose Adventures of Annoying Orange
  - "Welcome to My Fruitmare" (2012)
  - "Dr. Strangeplum" (2012)
  - "Peartergeist" (2013)
  - "Bat's All, Fruits" (2013)
  - "Little Cart of Scaries" (2013)
- Hi Hi Puffy AmiYumi
  - "Talent Suckers" (2004)
- I Am Weasel:
  - "I Am Vampire" (1998)
  - "I Are Ghost" (1999)
  - "I Am Franken-Weasel" (1999)
- Johnny Bravo:
  - "Bravo Dooby Doo" (1997)
  - "A Wolf in Chick's Clothing" (1997)
  - "Going Batty" (1997)
  - "Frankenbravo" (2001)
- Johnny Test:
  - "Johnny Trick or Treat/Nightmare on Johnny's Street" (2011)
  - "The Johnny Who Saved Halloween/Johnny's Zombie Bomb" (2013)
- Justice League Action:
  - "Trick or Threat" (2017)
- Kenny the Shark
  - "Scaredy Shark" (2005)
- Krypto Saves the Day!: "Halloween Havoc" (2025)
- The Life and Times of Juniper Lee:
  - "It's the Great Pumpkin, Juniper Lee" (2005)
- Littlest Pet Shop (2012):
  - Littlest Pet Shop of Horrors" (2015)
- MAD:
  - "Kitchen Nightmares Before Christmas/How I Met Your Mummy" (2011)
  - "Frankenwinnie/ParaMorgan" (2012)
  - "Doraline/Monster Mashville" (2013)
- Mao Mao: Heroes of Pure Heart:
  - "Fright Wig" (2019)
- Mighty Magiswords:
  - "Flirty Phantom" (2016)
- Mr. Bean: The Animated Series:
  - "Dead Cat" (2003)
  - "Rat Trap" (2015)
  - "Halloween" (2016)
  - "Haunted House" (2019)
  - "Ghost Spotters" (2026)
- The Mr. Men Show:
  - "Full Moon/Night" (2008)
- My Gym Partner's a Monkey:
  - "It's the Creppy Custodian, Adam Lyon" (2006)
- Ninjago (TV series):
  - Ninjago: Day of the Departed (2016)
- OK K.O.! Let's Be Heroes:
  - "We Got Hacked" (2017)
  - "Parents Day" (2017)
  - "Monster Party" (2018)
- Out of Jimmy's Head:
  - Ghosts" (2007)
- Over the Garden Wall (2014)
- Pound Puppies (2010):
  - "Nightmare on Pound Street" (2010)
- Power Players:
  - "All Trick no Treat" (2019)
  - "Gathering Dark" (2019)
- The Powerpuff Girls:
  - "Boogie Frights/Abracadaver" (1998)
- The Powerpuff Girls:
  - "The Squashening" (2016)
  - "Midnight at the Mayor's Mansion" (2017)
  - "Witch's Crew" (2018)
- R.L. Stine's The Haunting Hour:
  - "Pumpkinhead" (2011)
  - "I'm Not Martin" (2014)
  - "Return of the Pumpkinheads" (2014)
- Robotboy:
  - "Halloween" (2005)
- Samurai Jack:
  - "Episode XXX: Jack and the Zombies" (2002)
- Scaredy Squirrel:
  - "Halloweekend" (2011)
- Sidekick:
  - "Halloweenie" (2010)
- Steven Universe:
  - "Horror Club" (2015)
- Stoked:
  - "Penthouse of Horror" (2009)
- Summer Camp Island:
  - "Ghost the Boy" (2018)
  - "Mop Forever" (2019)
- Teen Titans:
  - "Haunted (2004)
- Time Squad:
  - "White House Weirdness" (2002)
- The Nightmare Room:
  - "Full Moon Halloween" (2001)
- The Tom and Jerry Show:
  - "Costume Party Smarty" (2019)
- Totally Spies!:
  - "Stuck in the Middle Ages with You" (2001)
  - "Halloween is Like So Pagan" (2005)
- Transformers: Animated:
  - "Along Came a Spider" (2008)
- Transformers: Rescue Bots:
  - "Ghost in the Machine" (2016)
- Tutenstein:
  - "Day on the Undead" (2004)
- Uncle Grandpa:
  - "Afraid of the Dark" (2013)
  - "Haunted RV" (2014)
  - "Fool Moon" (2015)
  - "Costume Crisis" (2016)
- Unikitty!:
  - "Spoooooky Game" (2017)
  - "Scary Tales" (2018)
  - "Scary Tales 2" (2019)
- Victor and Valentino:
  - "El Silbon" (2019)
  - "Ghosted" (2020)
  - "PuzzleMaster" (2021)
- Young Justice:
  - "Secrets" (2011)

===== Adventure Time =====
- "Slumber Party Panic" (2010)
- "The Creeps" (2011)
- "From Bad to Worse" (2011)
- "No One Can Hear You" (2011)
- "Ghost Fly" (2014)
- "Blank-Eyed Girl" (2016)

===== Courage the Cowardly Dog =====
- "Courage Meets Bigfoot" (1999)
- "The Demon in the Mattress" (1999)
- "Night of the Weremole" (1999)
- "Shirley the Medium" (2000)
- "King Ramses' Curse" (2000)
- "Courage Meets the Mummy" (2001)

===== Regular Show / Regular Show: The Lost Tapes =====
- "Terror Tales of the Park" (2011)
- "Terror Tales of the Park II" (2012)
- "Terror Tales of the Park III" (2013)
- "Terror Tales of the Park IV" (2014)
- "Terror Tales of the Park V" (2015)
- "Terror Tales of the Park VI" (2016)
- "Terror Tales of the Park VII" (2026)

===== Teen Titans Go! =====
- "Halloween" (2014)
- "Scary Figure Dance" (2015)
- "Halloween vs. Christmas" (2016)
- "Costume Contest" (2017)
- "Monster Squad!" (2018)
- "Witches Brew" (2019)
- "Ghost with the Most" (2020)
- "Pepo the Pumpkinman" (2021)
- "Welcome to Halloween" (2022)
- "Haunted Tank" (2023)
- "Not a Halloween Special" (2025)

===== Total Drama =====
- Total Drama Island:
  - "Hook, Line & Screamer" (2007)
- Total Drama Action:
  - "The Sand Witch Project" (2009)
- Total Drama World Tour:
  - "I See London..." (2010)
- Total Drama: Revenge of the Island:
  - "Finders Creepers" (2012)
- Total Drama: All-Stars:
  - "Moon Madness" (2013/2014)
- Total Drama: Pahkitew Island:
  - "Hurl & Go Seek" (2014)
- Total Drama Presents: The Ridonculous Race:
  - "A Tisket, a Casket, I'm Gonna Blow a Gasket" (2015)
- Total DramaRama:
  - "That's a Wrap" (2018)
  - "Ghoul Spirit" (2020)
  - "Duncan Carving" (2020)
  - "Gwen Scary, Gwen Lost" (2021)

==== Disney ====
- The 7D:
  - "Buckets" / "Frankengloom" (2014)
- Adventures in Wonderland:
  - "Boo, Who?" (1992)
  - "A Wonderland Howl-oween" (1993)
- American Dragon: Jake Long:
  - "Halloween Bash" (2005)
  - "A Ghost Story" (2007)
- Amphibia:
  - "The Shut-In" (2020)
- A.N.T. Farm:
  - "mutANT farm" (2011)
  - "mutANT farm 2" (2012)
  - "mutANT farm 3" (2013)
- Austin & Ally:
  - "Costumes & Courage" (2012)
  - "Horror Stories & Halloween Scares" (2014)
  - "Scary Spirits & Spooky Stories" (2015)
- Avengers Assemble:
  - "Into the Dark Dimension" (2016)
  - "Why I Hate Halloween" (2017)
- Bear in the Big Blue House:
  - "Halloween Bear" (1999)
- Best Friends Whenever:
  - "Cyd and Shelby's Haunted Escape" (2015)
  - "Night of the Were-Diesel" (2016)
- Big City Greens:
  - "Blood Moon" (2018)
  - "Squashed" (2021)
  - "Pizza Deliverance" (2022)
  - "No Escape" (2024)
  - "Killer Kludge / "Tricked" (2026)
- Big Hero 6: The Series:
  - "Obake Yashiki" (2018)
- Bizaardvark:
  - "Halloweenvark" (2016)
  - "Halloweenvark: Part Boo!" (2017)
  - "Halloweenvark Part 3: Mali-Boo" (2018)
- Bonkers:
  - "When the Spirit Moves You" (1993)
- Brandy & Mr. Whiskers
  - "The Curse of the Vampire Bat" / "The Monkey's Paw" (2004)
- Bride of Boogedy (1987)
- Bunk'd:
  - "Camp Kiki-Slasher" (2016)
  - "Fog'd In" (2016)
  - "In Your Wildest Dreams" (2019)
  - "Bunkhouse of Horror" (2022)
  - "The Glitching Hour" (2023)
- The Buzz on Maggie
  - "The Big Score" / "Scare Wars" (2005)
- Chibiverse:
  - "The Great Chibi Mix-Up!" (2022)
- The Chicken Squad
  - "T-Wrecks" / "Trick or Eek" (2021)
- Combo Niños:
  - "Night of the Zotz" (2008)
- Crash & Bernstein:
  - "Scaredy Crash" (2012)
  - "Health-o-ween" (2013)
- D-TV: Monster Hits (1987)
- Dave the Barbarian
  - "That Darn Ghost!" / "The Cow Says Moon" (2004)
- Disney Fam Jam
  - "Trick or Treat Yo Self" (2020)
- Disney's Greatest Villains (1977)
- A Disney Halloween Hosted by Snow White's Magic Mirror (1981)
- Disney's Halloween Treat (1982)
- "Disney's Magic Bake-Off: Zombies" (2021)
- Disney Sing-Along Songs
  - "Happy Haunting - Party at Disneyland!" (1998)
- Dog with a Blog:
  - "Howloween" (2013)
  - "Howloween 2: The Final Reckoning" (2014)
- Don't Look Under The Bed (1999)
- Doug (TV series) (1991)
  - "Doug's Bloody Buddy" (1996)
  - "Night of the Living Dougs" (1998)
- Doraemon: Gadget Cat from the Future:
  - "Noby's Turn at Bat"/"The House of Forced Fitness" (2014)
  - "Werewolf Cream"/"Monsters In the House" (2014)
- DuckTales:
  - "The Trickening!" (2020)
- Electric Bloom: "How Tulip Became a Shelley: A Halloween Nightmare" (2025)
- Elena of Avalor:
  - "A Day to Remember" (2016)
  - "The Jewel of Maru" (2017)
  - "The Return of El Capitan" (2018)
  - "Flower of Light" (2019)
- The Emperor's New School
  - "The Yzma That Stole Kuzcoween" / "Monster Masquerade" (2006)
- Eureka!:
  - "Eurek-Or-Treat" (2022)
- Even Stevens
  - "A Very Scary Story" (2001)
- Firebuds:
  - "The Not-So Haunted House" / "Halloween Heroes" (2022)
  - "Escape Garage"/ "Halloween Hospital" (2025)
- Fish Hooks:
  - "Parasite Fright" (2011)
  - "Halloween Haul" (2011)
  - "Unfinished Doll Business" (2012)
  - "Chicks Dig Vampires" (2012)
- Frankenweenie (1984)
- Future-Worm!
  - "Robo-Carp-Alypse" / The Reemen / Dr. D, Ghost Hunter (2016)
- Gabby Duran & the Unsittables: Beware the Fright Master! (2021)
- Gamer's Guide to Pretty Much Everything:
  - "The Psycho Zombie Bloodbath" (2015)
  - "The Ghost" (2016)
- The Ghost and Molly McGee:
  - "Scaring is Caring" (2022)
  - "Frightmares on Main Street" (2023)
- Girl Meets World:
  - "Girl Meets World of Terror" (2014)
  - "Girl Meets World of Terror 2" (2015)
  - "Girl Meets World of Terror 3" (2016)
- Girl vs. Monster (2012)
- Go Away, Unicorn!:
  - Trick or Treat, Unicorn (2018)
  - Go Away, Frankencorn (2018)
- Goldie & Bear: Witch Cat is Which?/ Trick or Treat Trouble (2018)
- Good Luck Charlie:
  - "Scary Had a Little Lamb" (2011)
  - Le Halloween (2012)
  - Fright Knight (2013)
- Goof Troop:
  - "Hallow-Weenies" (1992)
- Gravity Falls:
  - "Summerween" (2012)
  - "Little Gift Shop of Horrors" (2014)
- Hailey's On It!:
  - "Beta's Gonna Hate/The A-maze-ing Maze" (2023)
- Halloween Hall o' Fame (1977)
- Halloweentown (1998)
- Halloweentown II: Kalabar's Revenge (2001)
- Halloweentown High (2004)
- Hamster & Gretel:
  - "The Nightmarionette" (2022)
  - "U-F-Uh-Oh" (2022)
- Handy Manny
  - "Halloween" / "Haunted Clock Tower" (2007)
  - "A Job from Outer Space" / "Sounds Like Halloween" (2011)
  - "Mrs. Lopart's Attic" (2012)
- Hannah Montana
  - "Torn Between Two Hannahs" (2006)
- Henry Hugglemonster:
  - "The Halloween Scramble" (2013)
  - "Huggleween Moon" (2015)
- Higglytown Heroes
  - "Halloween Heroes" (2004)
- High School Musical: The Musical: The Series
  - "Trick or Treat" (2023)
- Hotel Transylvania: The Series:
  - "The Legend of Pumpkin Guts" (2017)
  - "Welcome to Human Park" (2018)
- House of Mouse:
  - Mickey's House of Villains (2002)
  - "Halloween with Hades" (2003)
  - "House Ghosts" (2003)
- Hulk and the Agents of S.M.A.S.H.
  - "Hulking Commandos" (2014)
- I Didn't Do It:
  - "Next of Pumpkin" (2014)
  - "Bite Club" (2015)
- I'm in the Band
  - "Spiders, Snakes, and Clowns" (2010)
- Imagination Movers:
  - "A Monster Problem" (2009)
  - "Haunted Halloween" (2011)
- In a Heartbeat: A Night to Remember (2000)
- Invisible Sister (2015)
- Iron Man and His Awesome Friends
  - "Iron Friends Trick or Treats!/Leaping Into Fall" (2025)
- Jake and the Never Land Pirates
  - "Night of the Golden Pumpkin" / "Trick or Treasure" (2011)
  - "Tricks, Treats & Treasure" / "Season of the Sea Witch" (2012)
  - "Misty's Magical Mix-Up!" (2013)
  - "Pirate Ghost Story" (2014)
  - "Jake the Wolf" / "Witch Hook" (2014)
  - "Escape from Ghost Island" (2015)
  - "Night of the Stonewolf" (2016)
- Jessie:
  - "The Whining" (2012)
  - "Ghost Bummers" (2013)
  - "The Runaway Bride of Frankenstein" (2014)
  - "The Ghostest with the Mostest" (2015)
- JoJo's Circus
  - "The Legend of Clownfoot Special" (2003)
- Jonas
  - "The Tale of the Haunted Firehouse" (2009)
- Just Roll with It:
  - "Root of All Fears" (2019)
  - "Aliens Among Us" (2020)
  - "You Decide LIVE!" (2021)
- K.C. Undercover:
  - "All Howl's Eve" (2015)
  - "Virtual Insanity" (2016)
- Kick Buttowski: Suburban Daredevil
  - "Kick or Treat" / "Dead Man's Roller Coaster" (2011)
  - "Petrified!" (2012)
- Kickin' It:
  - "Boo Gi Nights" (2011)
  - "Wazombie Warriors" (2012)
  - "Temple of Doom" (2013)
- Kid vs. Kat
  - "Trick or Threat" (2009)
  - "House of Scream" (2009)
- Kiff:
  - "Trevor's Rockin' Halloween Bash" (2023)
  - "The Haunting of Miss McGravy's House" (2024)
  - "Ye Olde Candy Shoppe of Horrors" (2025)
  - "The Screamwriter" (2026)
- Kim Possible:
  - "October 31" (2002)
- Kirby Buckets:
  - "Flice of the Living Dead" (2014)
  - "The School Spirit" (2015)
- Lab Rats:
  - "Night of the Living Virus" (2012)
  - "The Haunting of Mission Creek High" (2013)
  - "Spike Fright" (2014)
  - "The Curse of the Screaming Skull" (2015)
- Lab Rats: Elite Force
  - "Sheep-Shifting" (2016)
- Lego Star Wars: Terrifying Tales (2021)
- Lilo & Stitch: The Series
  - "Spooky" (2003)
- The Lion Guard:
  - "Beware the Zimwi" (2016)
- Liv and Maddie:
  - "Kang-a-Rooney" (2013)
  - "Helgaween-a-Rooney" (2014)
  - "Haunt-a-Rooney" (2015)
  - "Scare-A-Rooney" (2016)
- Lizzie McGuire
  - "Night of the Day of the Dead" (2001)
- Lloyd in Space
  - "Halloween Scary Fun Action Plan" (2003)
- Max Steel
  - "Definitely Fear the Reaper" (2014)
- Mickey Mouse:
  - "Ghoul Friend" (2013)
  - "The Boiler Room" (2014)
  - "Black or White" (2015)
  - "The Scariest Story Ever: A Mickey Mouse Halloween Spooktacular" (2017)
- Mickey Mouse Funhouse:
  - "Fifty-Foot Pluto!" (2022)
  - "Ghosts of Haunted Gulch" (2022)
  - "Cora the Pirate Crab/The Curious Case of the Kooky Scientist" (2023)
  - "Stink, Stank, Stink!"/"Dia de Los Muertos" (2023)
  - "Halloweenville's Pumpkin Patch/"Martian Vs. Rocket Mouse!" (2024)
- Mickey and the Roadster Racers/Mickey Mouse Mixed-Up Adventures:
  - "The Haunted Hot Rod" / "Pete's Ghostly Gala" (2017)
  - "Goof Mansion" / A Doozy Night of Mystery (2018)
  - "The Spooky Spook House!" / Clarabelle's Banana Splitz! (2021)
- Mickey's Tale of Two Witches (2021)
- Mickey and Friends Trick or Treats (2023)
- Minnie's Bow-Toons:
  - "Tricky Treats" (2013)
  - Party Palace Pals!
    - "Minnie's Halloween Spook-Tacular" (2021)
  - Camp Minnie
    - "Camp Spooky" (2023)
    - "A Shadow and a Doubt" (2024)
  - Pet Hotel
    - "Pirate Parrot" (2025)
    - "Hoteloween" (2026)
- Mighty Med:
  - "Frighty Med" (2013)
  - "Lair, Lair" (2014)
- Milo Murphy's Law
  - "Milo Murphy's Halloween Scream-o-Torium!" (2017)
- Mom's Got a Date with a Vampire (2000)
- Moon Girl and Devil Dinosaur
  - "Coney Island, Baby!" (2023)
- Motorcity: Mayhem Night (2012)
- The Mouse Factory: Spooks and Magic (1972)
- Mr. Boogedy (1986)
- Mr. Young: Mr. Candy (2012)
- Muppet Babies:
  - "Happy Hallowakka" / The Teeth-Chattering Tale of the Haunted Pancakes (2018)
  - "Oh My Gourd" / The Curse of the Wereanimal (2021)
- Muppets Haunted Mansion (2021)
- My Babysitter's a Vampire
  - "Halloweird" (2012)
- Once Upon a Halloween (2005)
- Out of the Box
  - "Trick or Treat" (1999)
- The Owl House:
  - "Thanks to Them" (2022)
- Pac-Man and the Ghostly Adventures
  - "A Berry Scary Night" (2013)
  - "The Shadow of the Were-Pac" (2014)
  - "Pac's Scary Halloween Part 1" and Part 2 (2015)
- Pair of Kings:
  - "Pair of Clubs" (2011)
  - "King vs. Wild" (2012)
- Pat the Dog
  - "Trick or Treat Terror" (2017)
- PB&J Otter
  - "A Hoohaw Halloween" (2000)
- Pepper Ann
  - "A ‘Tween Halloween" (1998)
- Phantom of the Megaplex (2000)
- Phil of the Future
  - "Halloween" (2004)
- Phineas and Ferb:
  - "Get That Bigfoot Outa My Face!" (2008)
  - "One Good Scare Ought to Do It!" (2008)
  - "The Monster of Phineas-n-Ferbenstein" (2008)
  - "Day of the Living Gelatin" (2009)
  - "Invasion of the Ferb Snatchers" (2010)
  - "That's the Spirit!" / "The Curse of Candace" (2011)
  - "Monster from the Id" (2012)
  - "Terrifying Tri-State Trilogy of Terror" (2013)
  - "Drusselsteinoween" (2013)
  - "Face Your Fear" (2013)
  - "Cheers for Fears" (2013)
  - "Night of the Living Pharmacists" (2014)
  - "Night of the Living Candace Suits" / "Terrors of the Altspace" (2026)
- Pickle and Peanut:
  - "Gory Agnes" / Haunted Couch (2015)
  - "Trick or Treat" (2016)
- Primos
  - "Summer of La Mũneca" (2024)
  - "Summer of La Hamaca" (2024)
  - "Summer of Hacienda Chills" (2024)
- The Proud Family
  - "A Hero for Halloween" (2002)
- Puppy Dog Pals:
  - "Return to the Pumpkin Patch / Haunted Howl-oween" (2017)
  - "221B Barker Street / Leaf It To Puppies" (2020)
  - "Halloween Puppy Fashion Show Party / Full Moon Fever" (2021)
  - "The Pumpkin King / The Elf Who Halloween’d" (2022)
- Quack Pack
  - "The Boy Who Cried Ghost" (1996)
- Randy Cunningham: 9th Grade Ninja:
  - "Dawn of the Driscoll" / Night of the Living McFizzles (2012)
  - "Let the Wonk One In" / The Curse of Mudfart (2014)
- Raven's Home:
  - "The Baxtercism of Levi Grayson" (2017)
  - "Switch-or-Treat" (2018)
  - "Creepin' It Real" (2019)
  - "Don't Trust the G In Apartment B" (2020)
  - "The Girl Who Cried Tasha" (2022)
- Recess:
  - "The Terrifying Tales of Recess" (2001)
- Recess: Taking the Fifth Grade: Episode Three: A Recess Halloween (2003)
- The Replacements:
  - "Halloween Spirits" (2006)
- Return to Halloweentown (2006)
- Rolie Polie Olie
  - "The Legend Of Spookie Ookie" / Oooh Scary / Zowie, Queen Of The Pumpkins (1999)
- Sabrina: The Animated Series
  - "Nothin' Says Lovin' Like Somethin' from a Coven" (1999)
- The Scream Team (2002)
- Shake It Up:
  - "Beam It Up" (2011)
  - "Haunt It Up" (2013)
- Sheriff Callie's Wild West
  - "The Great Halloween Robbery" / The Ghost of the Scary Prairie (2016)
- The Shnookums & Meat Funny Cartoon Show:
  - "Night of the Living Shnookums" (1995)
- So Weird: Boo (1999)
- Sonny with a Chance / So Random:
  - "A So Random Halloween Special" (2010)
  - "Iyaz" (2011)
- Special Agent Oso:
  - "A View to a Mask" / "Pumpkin Eyes" (2010)
- Spider-Man:
  - "Halloween Moon" (2017)
- Star vs. the Forces of Evil:
  - "Hungry Larry" (2016)
- Stuck in the Middle:
  - "Stuck in a Merry Scary" (2017)
- The Suite Life of Zack & Cody:
  - "The Ghost of Suite 613" (2005)
  - "Scary Movie" (2006)
  - "Arwinstein" (2007)
- The Suite Life on Deck:
  - "Sea Monster Mash" (2008)
  - "Can You Dig It?" (2010)
  - "The Ghost and Mr. Martin" (2010)
- Super Robot Monkey Team Hyperforce Go!:
  - "Season of the Skull" (2005)
- Sydney to the Max:
  - "The Hunt for The Rad October" (2021)
- Tangled: The Series:
  - "The Wrath of Ruthless Ruth" (2017)
- Teacher's Pet:
  - "Let Sleeping-Over Dogs Lie" / "Costume Pity Party" (2000)
  - "The Tale of the Telltale Taffy" (2001)
- Teamo Supremo
  - "Haunted House on Horror Hill!" (2002)
- That's So Raven:
  - "Don't Have a Cow" (2003)
  - "Cake Fear" (2005)
- The Hive: "The Pumpkin Patch Puzzle"
- Timon & Pumbaa:
  - "Guatemala Malarkey" (1995)
  - "Jamaica Mistake?" (1996)
  - "Monster Massachusetts" (1996)
  - "Werehog of London" (1999)
  - "Ghost Boosters" (1999)
- Tower of Terror (1997)
- T.O.T.S.
  - "A Spooky Delivery" (2020)
- Toy Story of Terror! (2013)
- Twitches (2005)
- Twitches Too (2007)
- Under Wraps (1997)
- Under Wraps (2021)
- Under Wraps 2 (2022)
- The Villains of Valley View:
  - "Havoc-ween" (2022)
  - "The Haunted Jukebox" (2023)
- The Wiggles:
  - "Spooky Monsters" (1998)
  - "Pumpkin Face" (2013)
  - "Halloween Party" (2021)
  - "The Sounds of Halloween" (2023)
- The Weekenders:
  - "Nevermore" (2003)
- Walk the Prank:
  - "Prank or Treat" (2016)
- Wander Over Yonder:
  - "The Pet" (2013)
  - "The Gift 2: The Giftening" (2014)
  - "The Heebie Jeebies" (2016)
- The Wonderful World of Mickey Mouse:
  - "Houseghosts" (2021)
- Wizards of Waverly Place / Wizards Beyond Waverly Place:
  - "Halloween" (2009)
  - "Something Wizard This Way Comes" (2024)
  - "Spells Like Halloween Spirit" (2025)
- Yin Yang Yo:
  - "The Howl of the Weenie" (2008)
- Zeke and Luther:
  - "Haunted Board" (2009)
- The ZhuZhus:
  - Zombie Sleep Over (2016)
  - The Pumpkin Whisperers (2017)
- Zombies: The Re-Animated Series
  - "Screambrook" (2024)

===== Winnie the Pooh =====
- Welcome to Pooh Corner:
  - "Because it's Halloween!" (1984)
- Boo to You Too! Winnie the Pooh (1996)
- The Book of Pooh:
  - "The Book of Boo!" (2002)
- Pooh's Heffalump Halloween Movie (2005)
- My Friends Tigger & Pooh:
  - "The Hundred Acre Wood Haunt" (2008)
  - "Darby's Halloween Case" (2009)
- Playtime with Winnie the Pooh:
  - "Eeyore and Trick or Treat/Rabbit,Bea and the Pumpkin" (2024)

===== Ultimate Spider-Man =====
- Blade (2013)
- The Howling Commandos (2013)
- Halloween Night at the Museum (2014)
- Strange Little Halloween (2016)

==== Goosebumps ====
- The Haunted Mask (1995)
- Attack of the Jack-O'-Lanterns (1996)
- The Haunted Mask II (1996)

==== Nickelodeon/Nicktoons/Nick Jr. ====
- 100 Deeds for Eddie McDowd:
  - "All Howls Eve" (1999)
- 100 Things to Do Before High School
  - "Have the Best Halloween School Day Ever Thing!" (2015)
- Aaahh!!! Real Monsters
  - "The Switching Hour" (1994)
- The Adventures of Jimmy Neutron: Boy Genius
  - "Nightmare in Retroville" (2003)
- The Adventures of Paddington
  - "Paddington and Halloween" (2020)
  - "Paddington and the Halloween Mystery/Paddington's Campfire Stories" (2022)
- The Adventures of Pete and Pete: "Halloweenie" (1994)
- All Grown Up!
  - "TP + KF" (2007)
- All That:
  - "CNCO" (2019)
- Allegra's Window
  - "My Own Monster" (1994)
- The Amanda Show
  - "Episode 4" (1999)
- The Angry Beavers
  - "The Day the World Got Really Screwed Up" (1998)
- Are You Afraid of the Dark?:
  - "The Tale of the Twisted Claw" (1991)
  - "The Tale of the Laughing in the Dark" (1992)
  - "The Tale of the Midnight Ride" (1994)
- As Told By Ginger
  - "I Spy a Witch" (2001)
- Avatar: The Last Airbender
  - "The Puppetmaster" (2007)
- Baby Shark's Big Show!
  - "Baby Shark's Haunted Halloween" / Wavey Jones' Locker (2021)
- Back at the Barnyard
  - "Back at the Booyard" (2009)
- The Backyardigans:
  - "It's Great to Be a Ghost!" (2004)
  - "Monster Detectives" (2005)
  - "Scared of You" (2006)
  - "The Funnyman Boogeyman" (2009)
- Bella and the Bulldogs:
  - "Sha-Boo! Ya" (2015)
- Big Nate:
  - "Ghostly Coven of Man Witches" (2022)
  - "Scarytale Endings" (2024)
- Big Time Rush:
  - "Big Time Terror" (2010)
  - "Big Time Halloween" (2010)
- Blaze and the Monster Machines
  - "Truck or Treat" (2015)
  - "Monster Machine Halloween" (2022)
- Blue's Clues:
  - "What is Blue Afraid Of?" (1997) (Season 1, Episode 18)
  - "Blue's Big Costume Party" (2000)
- Blue's Clues & You!:
  - "Spooky Costume Party with Blue" (2020)
  - "The Ghost of the Living Room" (2021)
  - "The Legend of the Jack O'Lantern" (2022)
- Bossy Bear: "Nightmare on Sweet Street/Monster Mess/Fall Festival" (2023)
- Breadwinners
  - "Night of the Living Bread" (2014)
- Bubble Guppies:
  - "Haunted House Party!" (2011)
  - "Trick-or-Treat, Mr. Grumpfish!" (2016)
  - "Werewolves of Bubbledon!" (2021)
- Bunsen Is a Beast: Beast Halloween Ever (2017)
- The Casagrandes
  - "New Haunts" (2019)
  - "Croaked" (2019)
  - "Curse of the Candy Goblin" (2021)
- CatDog
  - "CatDogula" (1999)
- Catscratch
  - "Scaredy Cat" (2005)
- ChalkZone
  - "Pumpkin Love" / Chip of Fools / Irresistible / Please Let Me In (2003)
- Clarissa Explains It All:
  - "Haunted House" (1991)
- Cousin Skeeter:
  - "Haunted House of Blues" (1998)
- Danny Phantom
  - "Fright Night" (2004)
- Doug
  - "Doug's Halloween Adventure" (1994)
- Drake & Josh:
  - "Alien Invasion" (2006)
- Eureeka's Castle
  - "It Came from Beneath the Bed" (1991)
- The Fairly OddParents:
  - Scary Godparents (2002)
  - Poltergeeks (2011)
  - Scary GodCouple (2013)
- Fanboy & Chum Chum
  - "There Will Be Shrieks" (2011)
- Franklin
  - "Franklin's Halloween" (1997)
- Franklin and Friends
  - "It's Halloween Franklin!" (2013)
- Game Shakers:
  - "Scare Tripless" (2015)
- Go, Diego, Go!
  - "Freddie the Fruit Bat Saves Halloween!" (2008)
- Group Chat
  - "Sliming for Apples" (2020)
- Gullah Gullah Island
  - "Gullah Gullah Ghoul-Land" (1997)
- Harvey Beaks:
  - "Le Corn Maze... OF DOOM; Harvey Isn't Scary" (2015)
  - "Technoscare" (2016)
- The Haunted Hathaways:
  - "Haunted Halloween" (2013)
  - "The Haunted Thundermans" (2014)
- Henry Danger:
  - "Jasper Danger" (2014)
  - "Danger Things" (2018)
- Hey Arnold!:
  - "Arnold's Halloween" (1997)
  - "Headless Cabbie" / "Friday the 13th" (1999)
- How to Rock:
  - "How to Rock Halloween" (2012)
- iCarly:
  - "iScream on Halloween" (2007)
  - "iHalfoween" (2012)
- Invader Zim
  - "Halloween Spectacular Spooky Doom" (2001)
- It's Pony
  - "Scarecrow" / Cornapples (2020)
- Kamp Koral: SpongeBob's Under Years
  - "Cabin of Curiosities" (2021)
  - "Are You Afraid of the Dork?" (2021)
  - "Camp Spirit" (2022)
  - "Scaredy Squirrel" (2023)
  - "Cretins of the Night" (2024)
- Kenan & Kel:
  - "Two Heads Are Better Than None" (2000)
- Knight Squad:
  - "Fright Knight" (2018)
- Kung Fu Panda: Legends of Awesomeness
  - "The Po Who Cried Ghost" (2012)
- LazyTown:
  - "Cry Dinosaur" (2004)
  - "Haunted Castle" (2006)
- Lego Jurassic World: Legend of Isla Nublar
  - "The Haunted and the Hunted" (2020)
- Little Bear:
  - "How to Scare Ghosts" (1997)
  - "Goblin Night" (1998)
  - "Moonlight Serenade" (1999)
  - "Thunder Monster" (1999)
  - "Little Goblin Bear" (1999)
- Little Bill
  - "The Halloween Costume" / The Haunted Halloween Party (2001)
- The Loud House
  - "One Flu over the Loud House" (2016)
  - "Tricked!" (2017)
  - "Great Lakes Freakout!" (2022)
  - "Close Encounters of the Nerd Kind" (2024)
- Maggie and the Ferocious Beast
  - "Trick or Treat" (2002)
- Max & Ruby:
  - "Max's Halloween" (2002)
  - "Max and Ruby's Perfect Pumpkin / Max's Jack-o-Lantern / Max's Big Boo" (2007)
  - "Ruby and the Beast / Max and Ruby's Halloween House / Max's Trick or Treat" (2012)
  - "Ruby's Party" (2017)
- Middlemost Post:
  - "Scary Stories to Tell Your Cloud / The Pumpkin Pageant" (2021)
  - "More Scary Stories to Tell Your Cloud" (2022)
- The Mighty B!: Catatonic (2009)
- Miss Spider's Sunny Patch Friends: "A Bug-a-Boo Day Play"
- Monster High: "Spell the Beans" (2023)
- Monsters vs. Aliens: Mutant Pumpkins from Outer Space (2009)
- Moose and Zee
  - "I Don't Like Candy Corn" (2003)
- Mutt & Stuff
  - "The Happy Hallowoof Party" (2016)
- My Life as a Teenage Robot:
  - "Raggedy Android" (2003)
  - "The Return of Raggedy Android" (2003)
- The Mystery Files of Shelby Woo
  - "The Haunted House Mystery" (1998)
- Mystery Magical Special (1986)
- Ned's Declassified School Survival Guide
  - "Halloween & Vampires, Werewolves, Ghosts and Zombies" (2006)
- Nicky, Ricky, Dicky & Dawn:
  - "Field of Brains" (2014)
  - "Scaredy Dance" (2014)
- Oobi
  - "Halloween" (2003)
- Ollie's Pack
  - "Nightmare Frightscare" (2020)
- The Patrick Star Show
  - "The Haunting of Star House" (2021)
  - "Terror at 20,000 Leagues" (2021)
  - "Something Stupid This Way Comes" (2024)
  - "The Haunting of Flim-Flam House" (2025)
  - "Terror on Tape" (2025)
  - "Scary Tales" (2026)
- The Penguins of Madagascar
  - "I Was a Penguin Zombie" (2009)
  - "Driven to the Brink" (2010)
- Planet Sheen
  - "There's Something About Scary" (2010)
- Play Along with Sam
  - "The Spooky Party" (2014)
- Rabbids Invasion
  - "Rabbid Halloween" (2014)
- The Really Loud House:
  - "The Really Haunted Loud House" (2023)
- Rocket Monkeys
  - "Franken-Banana" (2015)
- The Ren & Stimpy Show
  - "Haunted House" (1992)
- Rocket Power
  - "The Night Before" (1999)
- Rocko's Modern Life
  - "Sugar-Frosted Frights" / "Ed is Dead: A Thriller!" (1995)
- Roxy Hunter and the Horrific Halloween (2008)
- Rugrats
  - "Candy Bar Creep Show" / "Monster in the Garage" (1992)
  - "Ghost Story" (1999)
  - "Curse of the Werewuff" (2002)
- Rugrats
  - "The Werewoof Hunter" (2021)
  - "Night Crawler/Goblets & Goblins" (2022)
- Salute Your Shorts
  - "Zeke the Plumber" (1991)
- Sam & Cat:
  - "DollSitting" (2013)
- Sanjay and Craig:
  - "Tufflips' Tales of Terror" (2014)
  - "Halloweenies" (2016)
- School Of Rock:
  - "Welcome To My Nightmare" (2016)
- Super Duper Bunny League: "Ghosts!"/"The Gobbler!" (2025)
- Side Hustle:
  - "Scare Bear" (2020)
- The Smurfs
  - "The Scariest Smurf" (2021)
  - "The Magic Pumpkin" (2022)
  - "Smurf Racers" (2023)
- SpongeBob SquarePants
  - "Scaredy Pants" / "I Was a Teenage Gary" (1999)
  - "Frankendoodle" (2002)
  - "Graveyard Shift" (2002)
  - "Ghost Host" (2006)
  - "The Curse of Bikini Bottom" (2009)
  - "Ghoul Fools" (2011)
  - "Don't Look Now" / "Seance Shmeance" (2013)
  - "The Legend of Boo-Kini Bottom" (2017)
  - "Krabby Patty Creature Feature" (2017)
  - "Doodle Dimension" (2018)
  - "The Night Patty" (2018)
  - "The Ghost of Plankton" (2019)
  - "A Cabin in the Kelp" (2019)
  - "SpongeBob's Spookiest Scenes Countdown Special" (2020)
  - "Squidferatu" / "Slappy Daze" (2022)
  - "Kreepaway Kamp" (2024)
  - "Curse of the WereDoodle" (2025)
  - "The Kreepy Krab" (2025)
  - "The Haunted Bucket" / "Go Fetch" (2025)
- Supah Ninjas
  - "X" (2011)
- The Secret World of Alex Mack
  - "The Secret" (1995)
- Teenage Mutant Ninja Turtles
  - "The Curse of Savanti Romero" (2017)
  - "The Crypt of Dracula" (2017)
  - "The Frankenstein Experiment" (2017)
  - "Monsters Among Us" (2017)
- Tickety Toc:
  - "Trick or Treat Time" (2015)
  - "Spooky Time" (2015)
- Tim Rex in Space:
  - "Astropumpkin"/"Spooky Night"/"Dinerstore" (2025)
- That Girl Lay Lay:
  - "Ha-Lay-Lay-Ween" (2021)
  - "Freaky Fri-Day-Day" (2022)
- The Thundermans:
  - "The Haunted Thundermans" (2014)
  - "Happy Heroween" (2016)
- T.U.F.F. Puppy:
  - "The Curse of King Mutt" (2011)
  - "Happy Howl-o-Ween" (2012)
  - "Hide and Ghost Seek" (2015)
- Unfabulous:
  - "The Dark Side" (2005)
- Unfiltered:
- "Happy Slime-o-ween!" (2020)
- Victorious:
  - "Terror on Cupcake Street" (2011)
- Wallykazam!
  - "Mustache Day" (2014)
- Wayside
  - "Rat in Shining Armor" (2007)
  - "Be True to Your Elf" (2007)
- Weinerville
  - "The Weinerville Halloween Special" (1993)
- Wild Grinders:
  - Wild Zombies/Scream a Little Scream (2012)
  - Texas Skateboard Horrorland Zombie Activity 3, Parts 1 & 2 (2013)
- The Wild Thornberrys:
  - "Blood Sisters" (1998)
  - "Spirited Away" (2000)
- Wylde Pak: "Ms. Withers' Parables" (2025)
- Wonder Pets!
  - "Save the Black Kitten!" (2006)
- Wow! Wow! Wubbzy!:
  - "Monster Madness" / The Last Leaf (2006)
  - "The Ghost of Wuzzleburg" / March of the Pumpkins (2008)
- Yo Gabba Gabba!
  - "Halloween" (2007)
- You Can't Do That on Television
  - "Halloween" (1984)
- Young Dylan:
  - "Haunted Hills" (2021)
  - "Saturday School" (2022)
  - "The Wilson Family" (2023)
- Zoey 101:
  - "Haunted House" (2005)

===== Paw Patrol =====
- "Pups and the Ghost Pirate" (2013)
- "Pups Save a Ghost" / "Pups Save a Show" (2014)
- "Pups Save a Sniffle" / "Pups and the Ghost Cabin" (2015)
- "Mission PAW: Royally Spooked" / "Pups Save Monkey-Dinger" (2017)
- "Pups Save the Trick-or-Treaters" / "Pups Save an Out of Control Mini Patrol" (2018)
- "Pups and the Werepuppy" / "Pups Save a Sleepwalking Mayor" (2018)
- "Pups Rescue a Rescuer" / "Pups Save the Phantom of the Frog Pond" (2020)
- "Pups vs. Ouchy Paws" / "Pups Save a Glow-in-the-Dark Party" (2021)
- "Pups Stop the Return of Humsquatch" / "Pups Save a Lonely Ghost" (2022)
- "Pups Save a Haunted Farm" / "Pups Save the Adventure Bay Boogie" (2025)

==== Power Rangers ====
- Mighty Morphin Power Rangers
  - "Life a Masquerade" (1993)
  - "Trick or Treat" (1994)
  - "Zedd's Monster Mash" (1994)
- Power Rangers Zeo
  - "It Came From Angel Grove" (1996)
- Power Rangers Turbo
  - "Carlos and the Count" (1997)
- Power Rangers Operation Overdrive
  - "Ronny On Empty" (2008)
- Power Rangers Dino Charge
  - "The Ghostest with the Mostest" (2015)
- Power Rangers Dino Super Charge
  - "Trick or Trial" (2016)
- Power Rangers Ninja Steel
  - "Grave Robber" (2017)
- Power Rangers Samurai
  - "Party Monsters" (2011)
- Power Rangers Super Samurai
  - "Trickster Treat" (2012)
- Power Rangers Megaforce
  - "Raising Spirits" (2013)
- Power Rangers Super Ninja Steel
  - "Monster Mix-Up" (2018)
- Power Rangers Beast Morphers
  - "Hypnotic Halloween" (2019)
- Power Rangers Dino Fury
  - "Old Foes" (2021)

==== Animaniacs ====
- Animaniacs:
  - (Season 1, Episode 29): Hot, Bothered & Bedeviled / Moon Over Minerva (1993)
  - (Season 1, Episode 30): Draculee, Draculaa / Phranken-Runt (1993)
  - (Season 1, Episode 62): Scare Happy Slappy / Witch One / MacBeth (1994)
- Animaniacs (2020): (Season 1, Episode 11) Phantomaniacs | Fear and Laughter in Burbank | Bride of Pinky | Things That Go Bump in the Night (2020)
- Pinky and the Brain: (Season 3, Episode 17) A Pinky and the Brain Halloween (1997)

==== Looney Tunes ====
- Broomstick Bunny (1956)
- Corn on the Cop (1965)
- A-Haunting We Will Go (1966)
- Bugs Bunny's Howl-oween Special (1977, CBS)
- Tiny Toon Adventures:
  - "Tiny Toons Night Ghoulery" (1994)
- Baby Looney Tunes
  - "A Mid-Autumn Night's Scream" (2005)
- New Looney Tunes:
  - "The IMPoster" (2016)
  - "Duck Duck Ghost" (2018)
- Looney Tunes Cartoons:
  - "Boo! Appetweet" (2020)
  - "Postalgeist" (2021)
  - "Bugs Bunny’s Howl-O-Skreem Spooktacular" (2022)
- Tiny Toons Looniversity:
  - "Nightmare on Toon Street" (2025)
- Bugs Bunny Builders: "Spellbound" (2025)

==== Scooby-Doo ====
- The Scooby-Doo Show:
  - "The Headless Horseman of Halloween" (1976)
  - "To Switch a Witch" (1978)
- The New Scooby and Scrappy-Doo Show
  - "A Halloween Hassle at Dracula's Castle" (1984)
- Scooby-Doo Meets the Boo Brothers (1987)
- A Pup Named Scooby-Doo
  - "Ghost Who's Coming to Dinner?" (1988)
- The Scooby-Doo Project (1999)
- What's New, Scooby-Doo?
  - "A Scooby-Doo Halloween" (2003)
- Scooby-Doo! and the Goblin King (2008)
- Scooby-Doo! and the Spooky Scarecrow (2013)
- Be Cool, Scooby-Doo!
  - "Halloween" (2017)
- Happy Halloween, Scooby-Doo! (2020)
- Trick or Treat Scooby-Doo! (2022)

== British or Irish Halloween-themed TV ==
Halloween has been celebrated in Scotland and Ireland for centuries, however in England it was eclipsed by Bonfire Night (Guy Fawkes Night) after 1605, hence it is not as big as an occasion there as it is in the United States. British Halloween-themed television programmes therefore were historically few and far between, but have become more frequent in the 21st century.

=== Drama ===
- Casualty@Holby City (2005)
- Dead Set (2008)
- Ghostwatch (1992)
- I May Destroy You: "Social Media Is a Great Way to Communicate" (2020)
- Jonathan Creek: "Danse Macabre" (1998)
- Juliet Bravo: "Halloween" (1984)
- Lewis: "Falling Darkness" (2010)
- Lost Hearts (1973) - the M. R. James adaptation was shown at Christmas but set at Halloween (which the original story was not)
- Midsomer Murders: "The Straw Woman" (2003)
- Midsomer Murders: "The House in the Woods" (2005)
- Midsomer Murders: "Death and the Divas" (2012)
- Poirot: "Halloween Party" (2010)
- Tales of the Unexpected: "Death in the Morning" (1982) - shown on 31 October and clearly designed for it, though there is only a brief general mention of "October"

=== Documentaries ===
- Andy Hamilton: "Search for Satan" (2011)
- Frankenstein - A Modern Myth (2012)
- Great British Ghosts: "Halloween Special" (2011-2012)
- Living Britain: "Halloween" - Series 1, Episode 5 (2009)
- Most Haunted Live!: "Halloween Special" (2002-2010)
- The Perfect Scary Movie (2005)

=== Teen and adult sitcoms ===
- 2point4 Children - "The Lady Vanishes" (1996)
- Birds of a Feather - "Ghost" (1998)
- Bottom - "Terror" (1995)
- Gary: Tank Commander - "Spooky Dooky" (2012)
- The Green Green Grass - "The Departed" (2009)
- Home To Roost - "High Spirits" (1987)
- The IT Crowd - "The Haunting of Bill Crouse" (2006)
- Inside No.9 - "Dead Line" (2018)
- London Irish - "Halloween Party" (2013)
- My Family - "Friday the 31st" (2003)
- Not Going Out - "Halloween" (2019)
- The New Tales Of Para Handy - "Halloween" (2007)
- Off the Hook - "Halloween" (2009)
- One Foot in the Grave - "The Wisdom of the Witch" (1995)
- Psychoville - "Halloween Special" (2010)
- Sykes - "A Haunting" (1973)
- Rising Damp - "Things that go Bump in the Night" (1975)
- Only Fools and Horses - "Ashes to Ashes" (1982)
- Only Fools and Horses - "Sickness and Wealth" (1989)
- Steptoe and Son - "Seance in a Wet Rag and Bone Yard" (1974)
- Motherland - "The Purge" (2019)

=== Reality ===
- 999: What's Your Emergency?: "Halloween" (2012)
- Bizarre ER: "Halloween" (2011)
- Central Steam: "Halloween" (2010)
- Come Dine with Me: "Halloween Special" (2012)
- Edwardian Farm: "Halloween" (2010)
- The Harbour: "Halloween" (2012)
- Killer Camp (2019)
- Live 'n' Deadly: "Halloween" (2010)
- The Only Way is Essex (2011)
- Strictly Come Dancing (2010–present)
- X Factor (2010) (2011) (2012) (2014) (2016)

=== Shows ===
- Celebrity Juice - "Halloween Special" (2012)
- Choccywoccydoodah - "I put a spell on you" (2011)
- Countryfile - "Halloween" (2009)
- Deal or No Deal - "Halloween Special" (2011) (2012)
- The Gadget Show - "Halloween Special" (2009)
- The Home of Fabulous Cakes - "Halloween Party Recipes" (2012)
- Oliver's Twist - "Jamie Oliver's Halloween" (2002)
- Paul Daniels - "Live At Halloween" (1987)
- QI - "Death (Halloween Special)" (2006)
- QI - "Horrible (Halloween Special)" (2010)
- River Cottage Forever - "Hugh Fearnley-Whittingstall's Halloween" (2002)
- Top of the Pops - "TOTP2 Does Halloween" (2007)

=== Children's ===
- Angelina Ballerina/Angelina Ballerina: The Next Steps:
  - "Henry's Halloween" (2002)
  - "Angelina's Trick or Treat Feat" (2011)
- Balamory:
  - "Thunder" (2002)
  - "Halloween" (2002)
  - "Spooks" (2004)
  - "Shadows" (2005)
- The Basil Brush Show:
  - "The Stupid Christmas, I Mean Halloween Episode" (2005)
  - "Basil's Hunted House" (2006)
- Bear Behaving Badly
  - "Unhappy Halloween" (2007)
- Blue Peter
  - "Halloween Special" (2010-2012)
- Bob the Builder
  - "Muck Gets Stuck" (1999)
  - "Muck's Sleepover" (2000)
  - "Muck's Monster" (2002)
  - "Spud the Dragon" (2002)
  - "Spooky Tales" (2015)
- Charlie and Lola
  - "What Can I Wear for Halloween?" (2007)
- ChuckleVision
  - "Halloween" (1987)
  - "Home Helpless" (1989)
  - "Spooks and Gardens" (1992)
  - "Clueless Chuckles" (1995)
  - "Chucklestein" (1996)
  - "Finders Keepers" (1996)
  - "A Night at the Theatre" (1998)
  - "Bigfoot" (1998)
  - "Chuckle and Hide" (1999)
  - "Spaced Out" (2000)
  - "Out for the Count" (2000)
  - "Keeping It Under Wraps" (2003)
  - "Which Witch Is Which?" (2004)
  - "The Vengeful Viking" (2005)
  - "One’s Bitten, Two’s Shy" (2005)
  - "Alien Antics" (2006)
  - "Spook When You’re Spooken To" (2007)
- Danger Mouse
  - "Trouble With Ghosts" (1981)
  - "A Fear to Remember" (2018)
- Fireman Sam
  - "Halloween" (1990)
  - "Bug Eyed Boy from Venus" (2005)
  - "Mummy's Little Pumpkin" (2005)
  - "Beast of Pontypandy" (2005)
  - "Hearts on Fire" (2008)
  - "Norman's Ghost" (2009)
  - "Norman's Halloween Heist" (2012)
  - "The Great Party Panic" (2016)
  - "The Why Files" (2018)
  - "Night of the Norman" (2018)
  - "Why Files 2: The Beast of Pontypandy Mountain" (2022)
  - "The Haunted Hayride" (2022)
  - "The Mystery of the Pontypandy Werefox" (2023)
- The Frighteners: Guillaume (1996)
- Ghosts of Motley Hall
  - "Party Piece" (1978)
- The Gingerbread Man
  - "The Gingerbread Ghost" (1992)
- Green Balloon Club
  - "Halloween" (2008)
- Horrible Histories
  - "Scary Special" (2012)
- Jackanory
  - "Ghoulies, Ghosties and Long Legged Beasties" read by Jon Pertwee (31 October-4 November 1966)
  - "Witch Stories" read by Rosemary Leach (28 October-1 November 1968)
  - "The Worst Witch" also read by Rosemary Leach (30 October-3 November 1978)
  - "The Witch in Our Attic" read by June Whitfield (29 October-2 November 1979)
  - "Mr McFadden's Hallowe'en" by Rumer Godden and read by Hannah Gordon (26-30 October 1981)
  - "Gobbolino, The Witch's Cat" by Ursula Moray Williams and read by Kathryn Posgon (25-29 October 1982)
  - "When the Night Wind Howls" with Bernard Cribbins, Penelope Wilton and Jonathon Morris (31 October 1984)
- Justin's House
  - "Alien Visitors" (2017)
- Little Howard's Big Question
  - "How Can I Make a Monster?" (2010)
- Me Too!
  - "Spooky Party" (2005)
- Meg and Mog: "Meg, Mog and Owl" (2003)
- Moondial (1988) - final episode
- Mr Bean: The Animated Series
  - "Scaredy Bean" (2003)
  - "Home Movie" (2015)
  - "Halloween" (2016)
  - "Haunted House" (2019)
  - "Ghost Spotters" (2026)
- My Parents Are Aliens
  - "Halloween" (2001)
  - "Halloween Tales" (2003)

- The New Worst Witch
  - "Trick or Treat" (2003)
- Peppa Pig
  - "Pumpkin Party" (2015)
  - "Pumpkin Competition" (2016)
  - "Spooky Clubhouse" (2024)
- Peppa Pig Tales
  - "Ghost Hunt" (2023)
  - "Halloween Costumes" (2023)
  - "Tricky Treats" (2023)
  - "Trick Or Treat" (2024)
  - "Spooky Funhouse" (2024)
  - "Halloween Mummies" (2024)
  - "Spooky Roller Coaster" (2025)
  - "Family Costume" (2025)
  - "Really Spooky Halloween" (2026)
- The Pinky and Perky Show
  - "The Menacing Phantom" (2008)
- Pocoyo:
  - "Halloween Tales" (2017)
  - "Pocoyo and Nina's Terror Show" (2017)
  - "Pocoyo and the Haunted House" (2018)
  - "Halloween Potion" (2019)
  - "The Reflection" (2020)
  - "Elly's Magic Wand" (2020)
  - "Angry Alien's First Halloween" (2021)
  - "Pocoyo's Scary Halloween" (2021)
  - "The Goblin Mask" (2022)
  - "Monster Soup" (2024)
  - "An Unexpected Spell" (2024)
- Postman Pat
  - "Postman Pat and the Beast of Greendale" (1997)
  - "Postman Pat and the Flying Saucers" (2004)
  - "Postman Pat and the Spooky Sleepover" (2004)
  - "Postman Pat and the Thunderstorm" (2006)
  - "Postman Pat and the Greendale Knights" (2007)
  - "Postman Pat and the Giant Pumpkin" (2016)
- Pumpkin Moon (2005)
- The Raggy Dolls: The Dark Wood (1986)
- Rocky Hollow
  - "Ghosts" (1985)
- Runaround
  - "Halloween Special" (1976)
- Scream Street: Trick or Shriek (2016)
- Shaun the Sheep
  - "Little Sheep of Horrors" (2007)
  - "Things That Go Bump" (2007)
  - "Pumpkin Peril" (2020)
- Simon and the Witch
  - "The Halloween Party" (1987) - Series 1, Episodes 9/10
- Ted's Top Ten
  - "Halloween Scares" (2021)
- Teletubbies
  - "Pumpkin Face" (1999)
  - "Halloween Pumpkin" (2022)
  - "Magic Tubby Custard Cauldron" (2023)
  - "Oh No Teddy in Trouble" (2023)
- Thomas & Friends:
  - "Ghost Train"/Percy's Ghostly Trick (1986)
  - "Thomas, Percy and the Dragon" (1991)
  - "Haunted Henry" (1998)
  - "Stepney Gets Lost" (1998)
  - "Toby's Discovery" (1998)
  - "Duncan Gets Spooked" (1998)
  - "Scaredy Engines" (2002)
  - "Percy and the Haunted Mine" (2002)
  - "Jack Frost" (2002)
  - "Bad Day at Castle Loch" (2003)
  - "Halloween" (2004)
  - "The Magic Lamp" (2005)
  - "Duncan and the Old Mine" (2005)
  - "Bold and Brave" (2005)
  - "Skarloey the Brave" (2005)
  - "Flour Power" (2005)
  - "Skarloey Storms Through" (2008)
  - "Toby and the Whistling Woods" (2010)
  - "Percy and the Monster of Brendam" (2012)
  - "The Phantom Express" (2013)
  - "Not So Slow Coaches" (2014)
  - "Flatbeds of Fear" (2014)
  - "Signals Crossed" (2014)
  - "Henry Spots Trouble" (2016)
  - "The Beast of Sodor" (2016)
  - "Helping Hiro" (2016)
  - "Wild Water Rescue" (2016)
  - "Blown Away" (2016)
  - "Henry in the Dark" (2017)
  - "Three Steam Engines Gruff" (2017)
  - "Cranky at the End of the Line" (2017)
- Thomas and Friends: Big World! Big Adventures!:
  - "An Engine of Many Colours/Colors" (2018)
  - "Outback Thomas" (2018)
  - "Samson and the Fireworks" (2018)
  - "Cyclone Thomas" (2018)
  - "Thomas and the Dragon" (2018)
  - "Diesel Glows Away" (2019)
- Timmy Time: Timmy Gets Spooked (2010)
- Tiswas: Halloween Special (1981)
- The Wind in the Willows
  - "Monster of the Wild Wood" (1988)
- The Worst Witch (1986)
- Worst Witch: A Mean Halloween (1998)
- Worzel Gummidge:
  - "Fire Drill" (1980)
  - "The Jumbly Sale" (1981)
- Worzel Gummidge (2019 TV Series):
  - "Guy Forks" (2021)
- Willo the Wisp
  - "Halloween" (1981)
- Woolly and Tig
  - "Halloween" (2013)
- Young Dracula
  - "Halloween" (2006)

== Japanese Halloween-themed TV ==
=== Anime ===
- Ouran High School Host Club Until the Day it Becomes a Pumpkin! (2006)
- Odd Taxi: "Trick or Treat" (2021)
- Princess Sara: "The Party of the Spirts" (1985)

To Be Added More

==== Pretty Cure ====
To Be Added

==== Digimon ====
- Digimon Adventure (1999 TV series)
  - "Out on the Town" (1999)

To Be Added More

==== Jewelpet ====
To Be Added

==== Pokémon ====
- Pokémon: Indigo League
  - "The Ghost of Maiden's Peak" (1998)
  - "The Tower of Terror" (1998)

=== Tokusatsu ===
To Be Added

== Others ==
=== Adam Ruins Everything ===
- "Adam Ruins Halloween" (2017)

=== All Saints (Australian medical drama) ===
- All Saints: "Happy Death Day" (1998)

=== At Home with Amy Sedaris ===
- "Halloween" (2019)

=== The Canterville Ghost ===
The Canterville Ghost, based on the 1887 short-story "The Canterville Ghost", is a 1986 made-for-television film starring John Gielgud and Alyssa Milano.

=== The Halloween That Almost Wasn't ===
A 1979 ABC television special.

=== The Halloween Tree ===
In 1993, Hanna-Barbera produced a made-for-television animated adaptation of Ray Bradbury's classic 1972 novel of the same name. Featuring narration by the author himself, the movie explains some of the history of the holiday as experienced via an across-time adventure with a group of trick-or-treating kids. The hand-painted backgrounds, haunting music of John Debney, and Bradbury's narration elevate this to much more than a mere children's Halloween special.

=== Kapuso Mo, Jessica Soho ===
The Filipino news magazine program on GMA Network titled Kapuso Mo, Jessica Soho (KMJS) aired a series of Halloween specials (titled "Gabi ng Lagim" since 2013.) since 2008.

=== Magandang Gabi... Bayan ===
The Filipino news magazine program on ABS-CBN titled Magandang Gabi... Bayan (hosted by Noli de Castro) aired a series of Halloween specials from 1988 until 2005.

=== The Midnight Hour ===
The Midnight Hour (also known as In the Midnight Hour) is a 1985 comedy/horror television movie which aired on ABC on Friday, November 1, 1985, at 9:00-11:00 PM EST and stars Shari Belafonte-Harper, LeVar Burton, Peter DeLuise, and Dedee Pfeiffer.

=== Neighbours ===
- Neighbours vs Zombies (2014) was an online special split into five parts featuring some of Ramsay Street's well known faces returning from the dead as zombies.

=== Once Upon a Midnight Scary ===
This 1979 television anthology Halloween special was hosted by Vincent Price. It featured the stories "The Ghost Belonged To Me," "The Legend of Sleepy Hollow," and "The House With a Clock In Its Walls."

=== Deal or no Deal UK ===
In 2013 the British game show hosted a week long Halloween themed week of episodes with every contestant dressed up.

=== The Wickedest Witch (1989) ===
This made-for-television film, starring Rue McClanahan as the title character and part of a series of holiday specials featuring Paul Fusco's puppets, aired on NBC on October 30, 1989.

=== AMC Halloween movie specials ===
AMC broadcasts many Halloween classics, including movies from the Halloween, Friday the 13th, A Nightmare on Elm Street, Child's Play, Scream and Saw franchises, as well Stephen King adaptations during the month of October.

== See also ==
- List of films set around Halloween
- List of Christmas television specials
- List of United States Christmas television specials
- List of United States Christmas television episodes
- List of St. Patrick's Day television specials
- List of Thanksgiving television specials
- List of Easter television specials
- List of Valentine's Day television specials
- List of Independence Day television specials
