= 2014 MTV Movie Awards =

American awards show

- Date: Sunday, April 13, 2014
- Location: Nokia Theatre, Los Angeles, California
- Country: United States
- Hosted by: Conan O'Brien

Television/radio coverage
- Network: MTV, MTV2, VH1, and Logo
- Produced by: Den of Thieves
- Directed by: Hamish Hamilton

The 2014 MTV Movie Awards were held on April 13, 2014, at the Nokia Theatre in Los Angeles, California. The show was hosted by late-night personality Conan O'Brien. The nominees were announced on the morning of March 6, 2014. Zendaya, Tyler Posey, and MTV News personalities Josh Horowitz and Christina Garibaldi co-hosted the pre-show.

== Opening scene cameos ==
In the pre-recorded, opening scene of the show, 50 celebrities (including O'Brien) made cameos. Those included (in order of appearance): Andy Samberg, Seth Rogen, Sarah Silverman, Ice Cube, Elijah Wood, Chris Pratt, Jessica Alba, Ashton Kutcher, Anna Faris, Danny McBride, Ed Helms, Jason Bateman, Lupita Nyong'o, Adam Sandler, Russell Crowe, Jennifer Connelly, Emma Watson, Anthony Hopkins, Logan Lerman, Shaun White, Rosario Dawson, Willie Nelson, Blake Griffin, Taylor Swift, Martin Scorsese, James Franco, Paul Rudd, Aziz Ansari, Grumpy Cat, Carrie Brownstein, Fred Armisen, Skrillex, Demi Moore, Tracy Morgan, Tom Arnold, Simon Helberg, Melissa Rauch, Mayim Bialik, Johnny Galecki, Jim Parsons, Kunal Nayyar, Kaley Cuoco, Mindy Kaling, Adam Scott, Elliot Page (Note: Credited as Ellen Page), Charles Barkley, Jack Nicholson, Katy Perry, and Jack White.

== Performers ==
- Conan O'Brien and Adam DeVine — Opening number
- Twenty One Pilots — "Car Radio"
- Eminem and Rihanna — "The Monster"
- Ellie Goulding, Zedd, Matthew Koma, and Miriam Bryant— "Beating Heart" / "Find You"

== Presenters ==
- Lupita Nyong'o – presented Best On-Screen Transformation
- Seth MacFarlane and Amanda Seyfried – presented Best Comedic Performance
- Shaliene Woodley and Ansel Elgort – introduced Twenty One Pilots
- Chris Pratt – presented reminder to vote for Movie of the Year
- Jared Leto – presented Best Villain
- Rita Ora and Jessica Alba – presented Best Shirtless Performance
- Elliot Page – presented sneak peek to X-Men: Days of Future Past
- Mila Kunis and Jonah Hill – presented MTV Trailblazer Award
- Orlando Bloom – introduced Eminem and Rihanna
- Seth Rogen, Zac Efron, and Dave Franco – presented Best Kiss
- Cameron Diaz, Leslie Mann, Nicki Minaj, and Kate Upton – presented Best Male Performance
- Jordana Brewster – presented tribute to Paul Walker
- Aaron Taylor-Johnson – presented Best Fight
- Adrian Grenier, Jerry Ferrara, and Kevin Dillon – presented MTV Generation Award
- Andrew Garfield, Emma Stone, and Jamie Foxx – presented exclusive clip from The Amazing Spider-Man 2
- Miles Teller and Iggy Azalea – introduced Ellie Goulding and Zedd
- Johnny Depp – presented Best Movie of the Year

== Nominations ==
=== Films with multiple nominations ===
The following films received multiple nominations:

- Eight - American Hustle, The Wolf of Wall Street, and The Hunger Games: Catching Fire
- Six - We're the Millers
- Four - 12 Years a Slave, Anchorman 2: The Legend Continues, Dallas Buyers Club, The Hobbit: The Desolation of Smaug, and This Is the End
- Two - Identity Thief, Iron Man 3, Ride Along, The Spectacular Now, and Thor: The Dark World

=== Individuals with multiple nominations ===
The following individuals received multiple nominations:

- Five - Leonardo DiCaprio (The Wolf of Wall Street)
- Four - Jennifer Lawrence (American Hustle and The Hunger Games: Catching Fire)
- Three - Amy Adams (American Hustle), Jennifer Aniston (We're The Millers), Matthew McConaughey (Dallas Buyers Club), Jonah Hill (The Wolf of Wall Street and This is the End), Melissa McCarthy (Identity Thief and The Heat), and Will Poulter (We're the Millers)
- Two - Tina Fey (Anchorman 2: The Legend Continues), Amy Poehler (Anchorman 2: The Legend Continues), Kanye West (Anchorman 2: The Legend Continues), Steve Carell (Anchorman 2: The Legend Continues), Will Ferrell (Anchorman 2: The Legend Continues), Paul Rudd (Anchorman 2: The Legend Continues), David Koechner (Anchorman 2: The Legend Continues), Jared Leto (Dallas Buyers Club) Orlando Bloom (The Hobbit: The Desolation of Smaug), Chris Hemsworth (Thor: The Dark World), Kevin Hart (Ride Along), Seth Rogen (This is the End), Channing Tatum (This is the End and White House Down), Christian Bale (American Hustle), and Miles Teller (The Spectacular Now)

== Multiple winners ==
- Three – The Hunger Games: Catching Fire
- Two – We're the Millers, The Wolf of Wall Street, and This Is the End

== Awards ==
The winners are in bold. An asterisk (*) indicates that the winners were announced during the pre-show.

Movie of the Year
**The Hunger Games: Catching Fire**; 12 Years a Slave; American Hustle; The Hobbit: The Desolation of Smaug; The Wolf of Wall Street
| Best Male Performance | Best Female Performance |
| **Josh Hutcherson – The Hunger Games: Catching Fire**; Bradley Cooper – American Hustle; Chiwetel Ejiofor – 12 Years a Slave; Leonardo DiCaprio – The Wolf of Wall Street; Matthew McConaughey – Dallas Buyers Club | **Jennifer Lawrence – The Hunger Games: Catching Fire**; Amy Adams – American Hustle; Jennifer Aniston – We're the Millers; Lupita Nyong'o – 12 Years a Slave; Sandra Bullock – Gravity |
| Best Scared-As-S**t Performance | Breakthrough Performance |
| **Brad Pitt – World War Z**; Rose Byrne – Insidious: Chapter 2; Jessica Chastain – Mama; Vera Farmiga – The Conjuring; Ethan Hawke – The Purge | **Will Poulter – We're the Millers***; Liam James – The Way, Way Back; Margot Robbie – The Wolf of Wall Street; Michael B. Jordan – Fruitvale Station; Miles Teller – The Spectacular Now |
| Best On-Screen Duo | Best Shirtless Performance |
| **Vin Diesel & Paul Walker – Fast & Furious 6**; Amy Adams & Christian Bale – American Hustle; Ice Cube & Kevin Hart – Ride Along; Leonardo DiCaprio & Jonah Hill – The Wolf of Wall Street; Matthew McConaughey & Jared Leto – Dallas Buyers Club | **Zac Efron – That Awkward Moment**; Chris Hemsworth – Thor: The Dark World; Jennifer Aniston – We're the Millers; Leonardo DiCaprio – The Wolf of Wall Street; Sam Claflin – The Hunger Games: Catching Fire |
| Best Fight | Best Kiss |
| **Orlando Bloom & Evangeline Lilly vs. Orcs – The Hobbit: The Desolation of Smaug**; Jason Bateman vs. Melissa McCarthy – Identity Thief; Jennifer Lawrence, Josh Hutcherson, & Sam Claflin vs. Mutant Monkeys – The Hunger Games: Catching Fire; Jonah Hill vs. James Franco & Seth Rogen – This Is the End; Will Ferrell, Paul Rudd, David Koechner, & Steve Carell vs. James Marsden vs. Sacha Baron Cohen vs. Kanye West vs. Tina Fey & Amy Poehler vs. Jim Carrey & Marion Cotillard vs. Will Smith vs. Liam Neeson & John C. Reilly vs. Greg Kinnear – Anchorman 2: The Legend Continues | **Emma Roberts, Jennifer Aniston, & Will Poulter – We're the Millers**; Ashley Benson, James Franco, & Vanessa Hudgens – Spring Breakers; Jennifer Lawrence & Amy Adams – American Hustle; Joseph Gordon-Levitt & Scarlett Johansson – Don Jon; Shailene Woodley & Miles Teller – The Spectacular Now |
| #WTF Moment | Best Villain |
| **Leonardo DiCaprio – The Wolf of Wall Street**; Cameron Diaz – The Counselor; Channing Tatum & Danny McBride – This Is the End; Johnny Knoxville & Jackson Nicoll – Jackass Presents: Bad Grandpa; Steve Carell, Will Ferrell, Paul Rudd, & David Koechner – Anchorman 2: The Legend Continues | **Mila Kunis – Oz The Great And Powerful**; Barkhad Abdi – Captain Phillips; Benedict Cumberbatch – Star Trek Into Darkness; Donald Sutherland – The Hunger Games: Catching Fire; Michael Fassbender – 12 Years a Slave |
| Best Musical Moment | Best Comedic Performance |
| **Backstreet Boys, Jay Baruchel, Seth Rogen, & Craig Robinson – This Is the End***; Jennifer Lawrence – American Hustle; Leonardo DiCaprio – The Wolf of Wall Street; Melissa McCarthy – Identity Thief; Will Poulter – We're the Millers | **Jonah Hill – The Wolf of Wall Street**; Jason Sudeikis – We're the Millers; Johnny Knoxville - Jackass Presents: Bad Grandpa; Kevin Hart – Ride Along; Melissa McCarthy – The Heat |
| Best On-Screen Transformation | Best Cameo |
| **Jared Leto – Dallas Buyers Club**; Christian Bale – American Hustle; Elizabeth Banks – The Hunger Games: Catching Fire; Matthew McConaughey – Dallas Buyers Club; Orlando Bloom – The Hobbit: The Desolation of Smaug | **Rihanna – This Is the End**; Amy Poehler & Tina Fey – Anchorman 2: The Legend Continues; Joan Rivers – Iron Man 3; Kanye West – Anchorman 2: The Legend Continues; Robert De Niro – American Hustle |
| Best Hero | Favorite Character |
| **Henry Cavill – Man of Steel**; Channing Tatum – White House Down; Chris Hemsworth – Thor: The Dark World; Martin Freeman – The Hobbit: The Desolation of Smaug; Robert Downey Jr. – Iron Man 3 | **Beatrice "Tris" Prior – Divergent**; Katniss Everdeen – The Hunger Games: Catching Fire; Khan Noonien Singh – Star Trek Into Darkness; Loki Laufeyson – Thor: The Dark World; Veronica Mars – Veronica Mars |

=== MTV Generation Award ===
- Mark Wahlberg

=== MTV Trailblazer Award ===
- Channing Tatum

=== Tribute ===
- Paul Walker
