= The Trial of Leslie Knope =

- Parks and Recreation episode
- Episode no.: Season 4 Episode 9
- Directed by: Dean Holland
- Written by: Dan Goor & Michael Schur
- Original air date: December 1, 2011

Episode chronology
← Previous "Smallest Park"	Next → "Citizen Knope"
- Parks and Recreation season 4

"The Trial of Leslie Knope" is the ninth episode of the fourth season of the NBC sitcom Parks and Recreation. It originally aired in the United States on December 1, 2011. The episode was directed by Dean Holland and written by Dan Goor & Michael Schur.

== Plot ==
After the events of the previous episode, Leslie Knope and Ben Wyatt agree to confess their romantic relationship to their boss Chris Traeger. Chris reluctantly launches an investigation between Leslie and Ben, holding trials to determine possible ethics violations. To lighten his depressed state during the hearing, Chris takes an extreme amount of vitamins and supplements. In the first trial, Leslie admits her relationship with Ben to the ethics committee but denies any possible corruption or wrongdoing as a result of dating her superior. Unfortunately, Chris announces that he has numerous character witnesses to prove her and Ben's special treatment toward one another, as well as possible bribery.

Leslie manages to deflect most of the witnesses' arguments brought to the trial, but one of the witnesses is rumored to be extremely important to the case. Leslie and Ron Swanson initially believe that the important witness is Ron's ex-wife Tammy Two; it is revealed to be George Williams, an electrician who was bribed by Leslie and Ben with a gift certificate to ignore their kiss at Li'l Sebastian's memorial service. Knowing she risks being fired, Leslie asks the Parks Department to help her find a loophole out of the situation. When the team is unsuccessful, Ron convinces Leslie to concede to the committee. Surprisingly, Leslie is only suspended for two weeks with pay. Chris reveals that Ben held a private meeting with the committee and took full blame for the bribery, effectively resigning as Assistant City Manager.

After the trial, Chris apologizes to Leslie and explains that he was only doing his job. He and the court stenographer, Ethel Beavers, reveal that Ben said his relationship with Leslie was worth losing his job for; he also declares his love for her. Leslie does the same for Ben by hiring Ethel for an addendum to the court transcript later that night.

During the credits, Jerry Gergich admits during the trial that his real name is Garry, catching both Leslie and Chris off guard.

== Reception ==
=== Ratings ===
"The Trial of Leslie Knope" received 3.720 million live and same day views when it first aired on December 1, 2011. The episode received a 1.8 rating among viewers 18–49.

=== Critical reception ===
Steve Eisler of The A.V. Club gave the episode a B+, scolding the episode for its lack of screen time to the other characters, but praising its ending for its emotional weight. Matt Fowler of IGN praised the episode and gave it an 8.5/10, writing, "It's really hard to find a comedy that can be ridiculously hilarious and satisfyingly sentimental at the same time."
