= Soulmates (Parks and Recreation) =

- Parks and Recreation episode
- Episode no.: Season 3 Episode 10
- Directed by: Ken Whittingham
- Written by: Alan Yang
- Original air date: April 21, 2011

Guest appearances
- Greg Derelian as Businessman; Andy Forrest as Kyle; Kirk Fox as Joe Fantringham; James Harvey as Jocky Guy; Yvans Jourdain as Councilman Douglass Howser; Aimee Parker as Checkout Girl; Josh Pence as Cowboy; Mark Saul as Ted

Episode chronology
← Previous "Andy and April's Fancy Party"	Next → "Jerry's Painting"
- Parks and Recreation season 3

"Soulmates" is the tenth episode of American comedy television series Parks and Recreation's third season, and the 40th overall episode of the series. In the episode, Leslie is disappointed when Ben rejects her romantic advances, and is surprised when she is matched with Tom in an online dating service. Meanwhile, Ron and Chris have a cook-off to determine which is better: red meat or ground turkey. The episode was written by Alan Yang and directed by Ken Whittingham.

After it aired, NBC launched a website for HoosierMate.com, the fictional online dating site featured in "Soulmates". The episode featured a guest appearance by stand-up comedian Kirk Fox as sewage department employee Joe, who previously appeared in the second season. Josh Pence, who appeared with Parks co-star Rashida Jones in the 2010 film The Social Network, also appeared in "Soulmates" as a man wearing cowboy clothes who dates Ann.

According to Nielsen Media Research, the episode was seen by 4.89 million household viewers, a slight decrease from the previous original episode, "Andy and April's Fancy Party". It received generally positive reviews, with several commentators particularly praising the performance of Aziz Ansari as Tom Haverford.

== Plot ==
Chris enacts a government-wide health initiative in Pawnee, starting by banning red meat from the city hall commissary; Ron strongly disapproves of this. Ron challenges Chris to a burger cook-off to prove red meat is superior to Chris' preferred turkey burgers, with red meat staying on the menu if Ron wins. Meanwhile, Leslie invites Ben out to dinner, but he turns her down, leaving Leslie confused because she was sure Ben was attracted to her. Ann, who is now dating multiple men simultaneously after taking Donna's advice to be more adventurous, tells Leslie to join an online dating website called HoosierMate.com and helps set up her profile.

Leslie finds a match that is 98 percent compatible with her – a "soulmate" rating – but is horrified to discover that it is Tom. Additionally, the crude sewage department employee Joe makes a romantic advance toward Leslie, prompting her to launch a "douche-vestigation" to find out why she attracts the wrong type of man. Meanwhile, Chris takes Andy, April, and Ron to a health food market called Grain 'n Simple, where he gathers numerous ingredients for the perfect turkey burger, but Ron is unfazed, simply buying a pound of red meat from his favorite food market, Food and Stuff.

In her investigation, Leslie quickly learns Joe merely hits on any woman as long as she is not elderly. She takes Tom out to lunch to learn more about him. He responds to all of Leslie's questions with his usual chauvinistic answers, annoying her to the point that she admits she took him out because they matched on HoosierMate. A delighted Tom teases Leslie the rest of the day by pretending they are a couple, but she finally silences him by kissing him. Chris notices the kiss and warns Leslie that he has a strict policy against workplace dating.

At the cook-off, Chris prepares his meticulous turkey burgers for the judges: Tom, Donna, Jerry, and Kyle. They all love it, but give much higher praise to Ron's simple hamburger on a bun. Initially surprised, even Chris comes to admit Ron's burger is superior after trying it, so he agrees to reinstate red meat on the commissary menu. Chris later tells Leslie his dating policy has affected others, explaining that he earlier warned Ben not to ask out a co-worker. Leslie realizes that is why Ben rejected her and is glad when Ben asks her to eat in front of her favorite city hall mural. Leslie deletes her profile on HoosierMate, and is relieved to learn that Tom has 26 different profiles on the site to match himself with any type of woman, all the profiles with the same first and last names except for the middle initials from A to Z, with Leslie matching the letter "N" profile, which stands for "nerd." Tom teases her, and Donna kisses him to silence him.

== Production ==
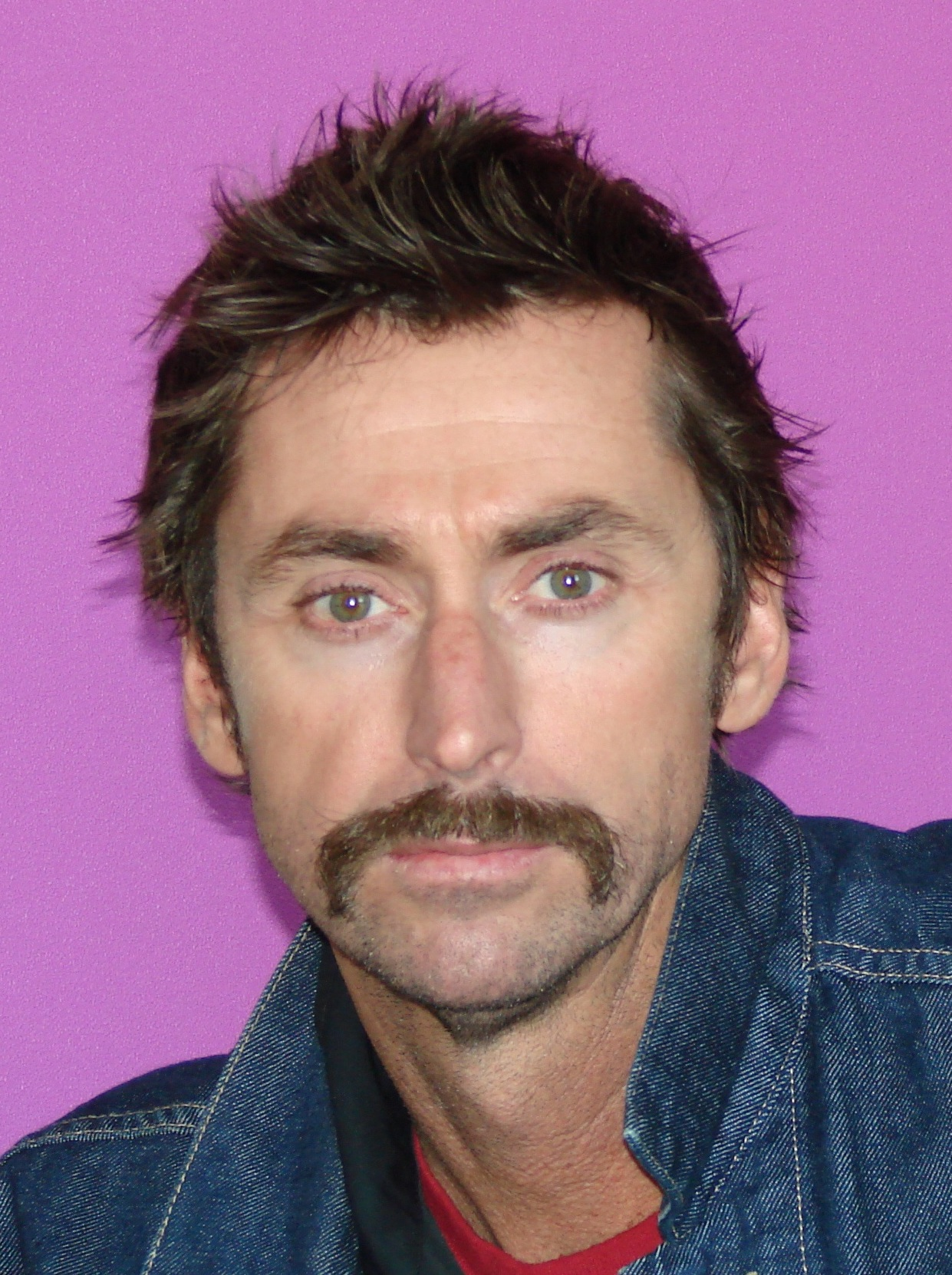
Stand-up comedian Kirk Fox made a guest appearance in "Soulmates".

"Soulmates" was written by Alan Yang and directed by Ken Whittingham. The idea of Chris' no-dating policy stemmed from real life policies in small town governments. Parks and Recreation co-creator Michael Schur said although romantic obstacles between two characters are difficult to make effective and genuine, he believed the policy was realistic and fitting with the type of show. Schur said: "The 'no dating' thing is a very big deal in government – these people are handling taxpayer money, so relationships are even more frowned upon than they are in the private sector."

The episode features a fictional online dating service called HoosierMate.com, inspired by the nickname Hoosier for residents of Indiana, where Parks and Recreation is set. After the episode aired, NBC started a fake website on an actual HoosierMate.com domain, which included fake accounts for Leslie and Tom similar to those featured in "Soulmates". Stand-up comedian Kirk Fox made a guest appearance in "Soulmates" as Pawnee sewer department employee Joe, who he previously played in the second season episodes "The Camel" and "Telethon". Josh Pence, who appeared with Parks co-star Rashida Jones in the 2010 film The Social Network, also appeared in "Soulmates" as a man wearing cowboy clothes who dates Ann.

During one scene in "Soulmates", Ron misunderstood a turkey burger to be "a fried turkey leg inside a grilled hamburger". After the episode aired, the cooking website Eater.com created and posted a recipe for that exact food.

== Cultural references ==
When Leslie asks Tom what he would ask for if given three wishes, one of them is to star in a remake of the 1991 action film Point Break playing the roles of both main characters, who are played by Keanu Reeves and Patrick Swayze. During one scene, while on hold during a telephone call, Tom sings badly out of tune to the hold music of "Forever Young", by the German synthpop group Alphaville. At one point, Tom describes the nicknames he has for various foods, and describes sandwiches as "sammies, sandoozles or Adam Sandlers", the latter of which refers to the comedian and actor Adam Sandler. Andy tells Chris his favorite food is Skittles sandwiched between two Starburst, which he calls "Andy's Mouth Surprise". When Leslie describes her ideal date as a dark and mysterious man who can play the organ, Ann says she believes Leslie is describing the title character from The Phantom of the Opera, a story about a deformed man who haunts an opera hall.

== Reception ==
=== Ratings ===
In its original American broadcast, "Soulmates" was seen by an estimated 4.89 million household viewers, according to Nielsen Media Research, with a 2.9 rating/5 share among all viewers and a 2.4 rating/6 share among viewers between ages 18 and 49. A rating point represents one percent of the total number of television sets in American households, and a share means the percentage of television sets in use tuned to the program. The "Soulmates" rating constituted a slight decrease from the previous episode, "Andy and April's Fancy Party", which was seen by 5.16 million households.

In its 9:30 p.m. timeslot, "Soulmates" was outperformed by the Fox crime drama series Bones, which was seen by 10.96 million household viewers, and the CBS forensic crime series CSI: Crime Scene Investigation, which was seen by 8.47 million households. It outperformed a repeat of the ABC medical drama series Grey's Anatomy, which was seen by 3.86 million household viewers, and an original episode of the CW Television Network drama series Nikita, which was seen by 2.013 million households.

=== Reviews ===
Somehow, the writers have managed to make every single character not only funny, but likable funny. ... There may be certain traits about each person that we don't like or, at times, feel are pretty obnoxious, but the writers have been smart enough to provide enough depth for each so that – even though it's just a half an hour sitcom with the simple goal of making us laugh – we can see there's something more to these characters.

— Eric Sundermann, Hollywood.com

"Soulmates" received generally positive reviews, with several commentators particularly praising the performance of Aziz Ansari. The Atlantic writer Scott Meslow said Ansari "has somehow found a way to make Tom petulant, sexist, and materialistic without ever being unlikable". Meslow also complimented the "slight but charming" subplot about the burger cook-off, and said Rob Lowe stood his own against the show's reliable comedic stars Nick Offerman and Chris Pratt. Zap2it writer Rick Porter called "Soulmates" one of the "out-and-out funniest episodes of the season" and provided Ansari with the "best sustained bit of comedy he's had in a long time". Porter also said he appreciated how the script "wisely didn't make much" over Ann's dating many men, claiming the subtlety of the joke was effective. Andy Daglas of ChicagoNow also said Ansari "stole the show" and that "Soulmates" was an excellent showcase for his character, who had largely remained on the sidelines throughout the season. Daglas said the scenes with Tom mocking Leslie were effective not only due to Ansari's performance, but also because of the genuine loyalty and admiration that had been built between the two characters.

The A.V. Club writer Steve Heisler called "Soulmates" one of the best Parks and Recreation episodes, and praised it for advancing its character relationships and finding "tons of natural, free-flowing comedy in something incredibly mundane", such as a conflict over burgers. Matt Fowler of IGN said he enjoyed seeing Offerman and Lowe pitted against each other, which he described as an "epic" pairing. Fowler also said he enjoyed that the script introduced "mini-mysteries" that took some time to reveal, like why Ben seemed uncomfortable around Leslie, and why Leslie and Tom were a match on the dating website. Nick McHatton of TV Fanatic said he is enjoying the slow and deliberate pace at which the Leslie and Ben relationship is progressing. He also said Ansari "delivered just the right amount to creep out Leslie (and) keep me in fits of laughter", and said Tom's slang nicknames for food were "some of the funniest Tom-isms he's doled out yet". New York magazine writer Steve Kandell said the episode demonstrates how, even several months after the addition of Lowe and Adam Scott to the cast, their presence allows for excellent new story opportunities, like the Ron and Chris cook-off and Ben's infatuation with Leslie.

Eric Sundermann of Hollywood.com said "Soulmates" demonstrates how Parks and Recreation is superior to other comedy shows because it "invests in its characters and really allows the audience time to get to know them" rather than depending solely on gags. Alan Sepinwall said he "laughed louder and more frequently at it than any episode so far this season" except for "Flu Season" and called the Ron and Chris subplot as "predictable as hell but perfectly-executed". Sepinwall objected to the introduction of a no-dating policy simply to slow the budding romance between Leslie and Ben, and said "so much of this season has been so perfect that the rare imperfections stand out even more than they would on a weaker overall comedy". Joel Keller of TV Squad said the no-dating policy felt like a plot contrivance meant strictly to keep Ben and Leslie apart, which he felt was not good for the story. However, he complimented Leslie and Tom's scenes together, and said the subplot was even funnier, which he called a "Ron Swanson classic". Entertainment Weekly writer Hillary Busis said the episode was "a little too disjointed for me", particularly because the two plots were barely associated with each other. However, she said the show included funny individual jokes, and enjoyed the moment when Leslie kissed Tom.
