= MTV Movie Award for Best Gut-Wrenching Performance =

This is a following list of the MTV Movie Award winners and nominees for Best WTF Moment, first awarded in 2009. In 2011, it was renamed Best Jaw-Dropping Moment. In 2012, it was replaced with Best Gut-Wrenching Performance.

== Winners and nominees ==
=== Best WTF Moment ===
Year	Nominees	Film
2009	Amy Poehler	Baby Mama
2009	Angelina Jolie	Wanted
2009	Ayush Mahesh Khedekar	Slumdog Millionaire
2009	Jason Segel and Kristen Bell	Forgetting Sarah Marshall
2009	Ben Stiller	Tropic Thunder
2010	Ken Jeong	The Hangover
2010	Bill Murray	Zombieland
2010	Betty White	The Proposal
2010	Isabel Lucas	Transformers: Revenge of the Fallen
2010	Megan Fox	Jennifer's Body

=== Best Jaw-Dropping Moment ===
Year	Nominees	Film
2011	Justin Bieber	Justin Bieber: Never Say Never
2011	James Franco	127 Hours
2011	Leonardo DiCaprio and Elliot Page (Note: Credited as Ellen Page)	Inception
2011	Natalie Portman	Black Swan
2011	Steve-O	Jackass 3D

=== Best Gut-Wrenching Performance ===
Year	Nominees	Film
2012	Kristen Wiig, Maya Rudolph, Rose Byrne, Melissa McCarthy, Wendi McLendon-Covey, and Ellie Kemper	Bridesmaids
2012	Bryce Dallas Howard	The Help
2012	Jonah Hill and Rob Riggle	21 Jump Street
2012	Ryan Gosling	Drive
2012	Tom Cruise	Mission: Impossible – Ghost Protocol

=== #WTF Moment ===
Year	Nominees	Film
2013	Jamie Foxx and Samuel L. Jackson	Django Unchained
2013	Anna Camp	Pitch Perfect
2013	Denzel Washington	Flight
2013	Javier Bardem	Skyfall
2013	Seth MacFarlane	Ted
2014	Leonardo DiCaprio	The Wolf of Wall Street
2014	Cameron Diaz	The Counselor
2014	Channing Tatum & Danny McBride	This Is the End
2014	Johnny Knoxville & Jackson Nicoll	Jackass Presents: Bad Grandpa
2014	Steve Carell, Will Ferrell, Paul Rudd & David Koechner	Anchorman 2: The Legend Continues
2015	Seth Rogen & Rose Byrne	Neighbors
2015	Rosario Dawson & Anders Holm	Top Five
2015	Jonah Hill	22 Jump Street
2015	Jason Sudeikis & Charlie Day	Horrible Bosses 2
2015	Miles Teller	Whiplash
