= Eagleton (Parks and Recreation) =

- Parks and Recreation episode
- Episode no.: Season 3 Episode 12
- Directed by: Nicole Holofcener
- Written by: Emily Spivey
- Original air date: May 5, 2011

Guest appearances
- Harrison Thomas Boxley as Joey; Bob Elliott as Bill; Bruce Green as Gary; Steven Meek as William; Tina Morasco as Christine; Alan Naggar as Larry; Eric Pierpoint as Chief Hugh Trumple; Damion Poitier as Gregory; Parker Posey as Lindsay Carlisle Shay; Mike Scully as Pearl; Virginia Louise Smith as Florence; Todd Stanton as Bertram

Episode chronology
← Previous "Jerry's Painting"	Next → "The Fight"
- Parks and Recreation season 3

"Eagleton" is the twelfth episode of the third season of the American comedy television series Parks and Recreation, and the 42nd overall episode of the series. It originally aired on NBC in the United States on May 5, 2011. In the episode, Leslie becomes angry when her former friend, the current parks director of the more prosperous neighboring town Eagleton, builds a fence through a park that runs through both Pawnee and Eagleton. Meanwhile, Leslie plans a secret birthday party for Ron, much to his chagrin.

The episode was written by Emily Spivey and directed by Nicole Holofcener. Parker Posey guest starred as Leslie's rival and former best friend, Lindsay Carlisle Shay. A longtime fan of Parks and Recreation and its star Amy Poehler, Posey had expressed an early interest in appearing on the show, and reportedly became frustrated with how long it took to be asked.

A fight scene between Poehler's and Posey's characters among piles of garbage was performed with stuntwomen during temperatures of more than 100 degrees. The subplot involving Ron's birthday had been conceived by the Parks staff early in the development of the show. Series co-creator Michael Schur called a final scene with Leslie and Ron, in which the two voice their mutual admiration for each other, his favorite of the season. "Eagleton" also featured a guest appearance by Eric Pierpoint as the Pawnee police chief Hugh Trumple and a cameo by Mike Scully, a writer and producer with the Fox animated series The Simpsons who has also previously worked on Parks and Recreation.

"Eagleton" received generally positive reviews and, according to Nielsen Media Research, was seen by an estimated 5.06 million household viewers, an increase over the previous original episode, "Jerry's Painting".

== Plot ==
Tom informs the department that Eagleton, a more prosperous neighboring town of Pawnee, has erected a tall fence in the shared Lafayette Park to keep Pawnee residents out of their side. Leslie suspects it is the work of Lindsay Carlisle Shay, Eagleton's parks and recreation director, a former Pawnee parks department employee and Leslie's former best friend. Meanwhile, Leslie has discovered Ron's upcoming birthday, a date he has kept secret for years. Leslie promises a horrified and annoyed Ron that she will throw a surprise party for him.

In a typically rowdy and disorderly public meeting, the citizens of Pawnee demand the fence be removed. Leslie meets with Lindsay, who condescendingly refuses to remove the fence and insults Pawnee in the process. Leslie, Tom and Ben attend an Eagleton town meeting to plead their case to its citizens. The Eagleton meeting is much different than those of Pawnee: it is a catered affair at a country club, where the citizens are wealthy and civil, but also snobbish and condescending. Citing the poor maintenance of Pawnee's side of Lafayette Park, the Eagleton citizens prefer the fence stay up. Leslie reveals to Tom and Ben that she was offered the job of Eagleton parks director five years ago but turned it down, as she and Lindsay both made a promise to remain in Pawnee. However, Eagleton then offered Lindsay the job and she accepted, thus turning her back on Pawnee and Leslie. Meanwhile, Ron becomes increasingly paranoid of Leslie's birthday plans, especially after he overhears April and Andy discuss outrageous party plans. When Ron asks Ann about Leslie's last birthday bash for Ann and learns what a huge party she threw, Ron eventually becomes so paranoid that he resorts to sleeping in his office to avoid any potential surprises at home.

Leslie quickly seeks revenge against Lindsay by getting her parks employees to throw garbage over the Eagleton side of the fence. When Lindsay arrives to stop it, the two get into a fight amid the garbage bags. The police arrive and arrest both women: Lindsay is jailed in Pawnee, while Leslie is jailed in Eagleton's pristine and hotel-like holding cell. After Ann bails Leslie out, she tells her that Lindsay built the fence because she is jealous that Leslie was offered the Eagleton job first and wants to get a rise out of her. Ann suggests that Lindsay should be hit with a baseball bat, which gives Leslie the idea to turn Pawnee's side of Lafayette Park into a wiffle ball field, with the fence serving as the outfield wall. Lindsay is impressed by how fast Leslie turned the fence into something positive, and remembers why she and Leslie joined the parks department in the first place. With their relationship on the mend, the two agree to get a drink together. Later, Leslie returns to the office to throw Ron's party: she takes him to an empty room with steak, whiskey and his favorite movies waiting for him, and reveals that April and Andy's duties were false leads to trick him. Leslie explains she made a party that he would want and leaves a content Ron alone to enjoy his birthday.

== Production ==
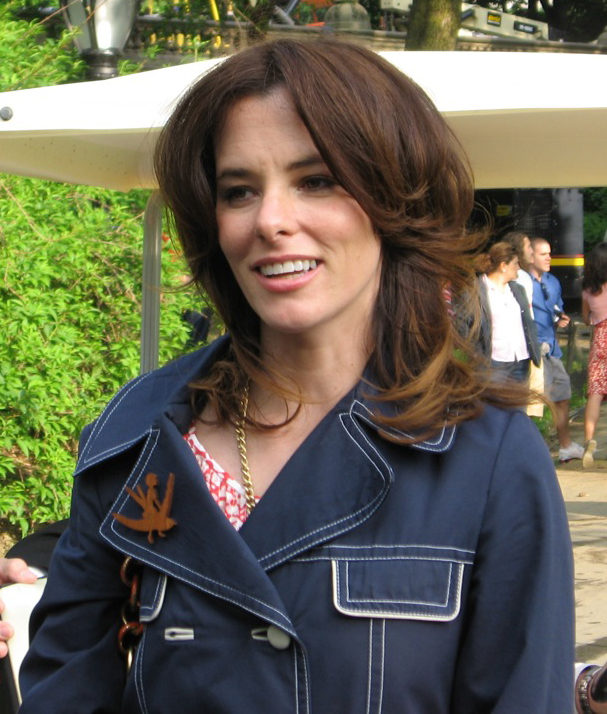
Parker Posey (pictured), who made a guest appearance in this episode, had wanted to appear on Parks and Recreation even before the series debuted.

Parker Posey, who previously worked with Amy Poehler on the 2009 comedy film Spring Breakdown, described herself as a fan of both Poehler and Parks and Recreation, and had wanted to make a guest appearance on the series even before it first aired. Posey discussed it with Poehler at the Spring Breakdown premiere during the 2009 Sundance Film Festival in January 2009, a few months before the first season of Parks debuted. She later met with the staff of the show about one year before "Eagleton" was filmed. After several months without an invitation to appear on the show, Posey said she became frustrated and stopped watching the show, but later changed her mind and started watching it again. Shortly after that, she received an e-mail message from Poehler inviting her to play Lindsay Carlisle Shay: "She said, 'You'll play my nemesis! We get to fight in a garbage dump!'" Posey said. "I remember reading that and thinking, 'Dreams do come true.'"

Posey was sent a script for "Eagleton" and enjoyed it so much she immediately agreed to play the part. She also said she was excited to work with director Nicole Holofcener. The episode was filmed in November 2010. Posey was shooting scenes for a film in Boston at the time, and flew into Los Angeles for the Parks and Recreation filming just a few hours before the shots began. As a result, Posey was exhausted during the filming, including the Eagleton public forum scene, which was shot at the Toluca Lake Sports Center in Toluca Lake district of Los Angeles. The scene in which Leslie and Lindsay fight among piles of garbage was filmed during temperatures of more than 100 degrees. Although stuntwomen were used, Poehler and Posey performed some of the fight themselves. Despite wearing wool blazers that made the heat even harder to endure, the two actresses said they enjoyed filming the scene. Poehler jokingly said it was included in the script "just because it's in Parker and I's contract, that that's how we will work together. It's the only way we'll work together, is fighting in garbage."

It's just very risky do stuff like that sometimes because if you haven't earned it, and the audience doesn't think you've earned it, then it just comes off as a cloying ploy for sentimentality. But Amy and Nick are just so good, and the relationship between Leslie and Ron is deep enough, and broad enough, where we can write something like that and they just perform the hell out of it.

— Parks and Recreation co-creator Michael Schur, discussing the final scene between Leslie and Ron

The staff of Parks and Recreation conceived the idea that Ron Swanson had his birthdate redacted from all government documents early in the development of the series, and it eventually developed into the subplot featured in "Eagleton" where Leslie finds out about his birthday and plans a surprise for him. Michael Schur, co-creator of the series, said the scene when Leslie surprises Ron with a quiet evening alone was his favorite scene in the show. During the scene, Leslie and Ron declare their mutual admiration for one another. Schur said it was difficult to make such an outwardly emotional scene effective in a comedy, but he believed it ultimately worked because of Amy Poehler and Nick Offerman's strong performances. Poehler said of the scene: "It's really sweet and it's just an example of how it's important to Leslie who she works with. It's just as important as the job itself. I completely relate to that." Rashida Jones also praised the scene, which she said made her cry during a cast read-through of the script.

Eric Pierpoint resumed his role as Pawnee Police Chief Hugh Trumple, a character he previously played in the earlier third-season episode "Ron & Tammy: Part Two". "Eagleton" features a cameo appearance by Mike Scully, a writer and producer on the Fox Broadcasting Company animated comedy series The Simpsons, as a speaker at the Pawnee public forum who suggests the building of a second fence around the Eagleton fence. Scully has worked as a screenwriter and consulting producer on Parks and Recreation since the first season. He did not originally wish to take the part and only agreed to it reluctantly. Originally, he only had one line, but improvised additional dialogue after Amy Poehler asked him why he believed a second fence should be built.

The outside view of the Eagleton correctional facility is of the Prowers County Courthouse located in Lamar, Colorado.

== Cultural references ==
When Leslie leaves Ron with his favorite movies for his surprise birthday party, one of them is The Bridge on the River Kwai, a 1958 film about British World War II prisoners forced to build a bridge in Thailand. The scene Ron watches on television is an actual scene from that film. The other film Leslie gives Ron is The Dirty Dozen, a 1967 war film about a team of convicted murderers being trained for a mission to assassinate German officers, also during World War II. Leslie only finds out Ron's birthday, which was a closely guarded secret, by bribing an employee from Baskin-Robbins, an ice cream parlor chain that gives free scoops of ice cream to customers on their birthdays. Eagleton is such a rich town that, after their town meeting, they distribute gift bags that include an iPod Touch, a portable music player by Apple, Inc. Lindsay Carlisle Shay also drives a Cadillac Escalade, an expensive luxury sport utility vehicle brand by Cadillac. During another scene, Ron declares that birthdays were made up by Hallmark, a greeting cards company, to sell more cards.

== Reception ==
=== Ratings ===
In its original American broadcast, "Eagleton" was seen by an estimated 5.06 million household viewers, according to Nielsen Media Research, with a 2.5 rating/7 share among viewers between ages 18 and 49. A rating point represents one percent of the total number of television sets in American households, and a share means the percentage of television sets in use tuned to the program. This constituted an increase over the previous episode, "Jerry's Painting", which was seen by an estimated 4.71 million households. The ratings improvement came despite the fact that the lead-in episode of The Office that immediately followed Parks and Recreation – "The Inner Circle", the first not to feature Steve Carell as a regular cast member – dropped significantly in the ratings.

In its 9:30 p.m. timeslot, "Eagleton" was outperformed by the Fox crime drama series Bones, which was seen by 10.94 million household viewers; the CBS forensic crime series CSI: Crime Scene Investigation, which was seen by 10.67 million households; and the ABC medical drama series Grey's Anatomy, which was seen by 10.11 million household viewers. Parks and Recreation outperformed an episode of the CW Television Network drama series Nikita, which was seen by 2 million households.

=== Reviews ===
Springfield has its Shelbyville, Cheers had its Olde Towne Tavern, Seinfeld had his Newman. And in the world of "Parks and Recreation," Pawnee has Eagleton. ... "Eagleton" worked nearly as well as some of those classic "Cheers" episodes.

— Rick Porter, Zap2it

"Eagleton" received generally positive reviews. James Poniewozik of Time magazine strongly praised Posey's performance, and said the garbage fight scene was one of the funniest of the season. He also complimented the show for giving Poehler's and Posey's characters a strong back story that helped further develop the history of Pawnee and the characters. Alan Sepinwall of HitFix said "Eagleton" strongly developed Leslie, particularly in the way she ends the feud with Lindsay by building something new rather than resorting simply to revenge. He also praised Nick Offerman's comedic performance, and said the episode continues the strong development between Leslie and Ron's characters. Steve Kandell of New York magazine enjoyed the comedic chemistry between Poehler and Posey – and especially enjoyed the garbage fight scene – but said the sudden resolution to their feud felt forced. Kandell said Nick Offerman stole the episode, and that the final scene between Leslie and Ron about his birthday party could be the best scene of the series. Damian Holbrook of TV Guide said Posey was perfectly cast in her guest role, and said of the episode: "Sometimes TV gets it right, and last night, Parks and Recreation got it uber-right." Matt Fowler of IGN found Posey's character "somewhat one-note", but felt the episode was an improvement over the previous week's "Jerry's Painting", and with great comedy coming from the portrayal of Eagleton and Ron's paranoia about his surprise birthday party.

Entertainment Weekly writer Ken Tucker said the pairing of Poehler and Posey led to great comedic scenes, but that the "heart of the episode" was Leslie's celebration of Ron's birthday. Tucker praised the show's optimistic tone, with characters who genuinely respect and love each other, even while many other comedies remained cynical. Hillary Busis, also of Entertainment Weekly, called Posey's performance "pitch-perfect" and called Leslie's construction of the baseball diamond "a sweet coda to a great, funny episode". Postmedia News writer Alex Strachan praised the episode not only for its likable and easily relatable characters, but for its willingness to address social issues like the divide between classes in Pawnee and Eagleton. Eric Sundermann of Hollywood.com said "Eagleton" seemed less story-driven and more over-the-top than usual, but that it works for the series because those episodes are funny and only happen periodically. Nick McHatton of TV Fanatic complimented Posey's performance, but especially praised Leslie's birthday surprise for Ron, and claimed it was the first time since the NBC series Friends that he responded to a television comedy so emotionally. Rick Porter of Zap2it said the episode handled the rivalry between Pawnee and Eagleton nearly as well as some of the classic Cheers episodes about that bar and its rival, the Old Towne Tavern. He also called Offerman "pitch-perfect" in what Porter described as an excellent B-story.

Steve Heisler of The A.V. Club said "Eagleton" further added to the mythology Parks and Recreation has built for itself by fleshing out the neighboring town." He also praised Leslie's birthday surprise for Ron, claiming it "sets Parks & Rec even more ahead of its competitors. Us Weekly writer John Griffiths gave the episode three-and-a-half out of four stars, and called it one of the show's "sharpest outings yet". He described Poehler and Posey's performance off of each other as "smart and feisty fun". USA Today writer Whitney Matheson called "Eagleton" the best episode of television of the week, and noted that Posey's performance contributed to an "already-great series". Joel Keller of AOL TV said it was one of his favorite episodes of the season because the humor was driven by the characters Leslie and Ron had developed into throughout the series. However, Keller said he believed Eagleton seemed too unrealistic and exaggerated as parody of rich towns. Not all reviews were positive. The Atlantic writer Scott Meslow called it a cartoonish and "strangely uneven" episode, and felt Posey's appearance was distracting and disruptive to the natural flow of the show. However, Meslow called the subplot about Ron's birthday "one of the season's best" and said it demonstrated the strength of the relationships between the characters.
