= Mara Marini =

Canadian actress

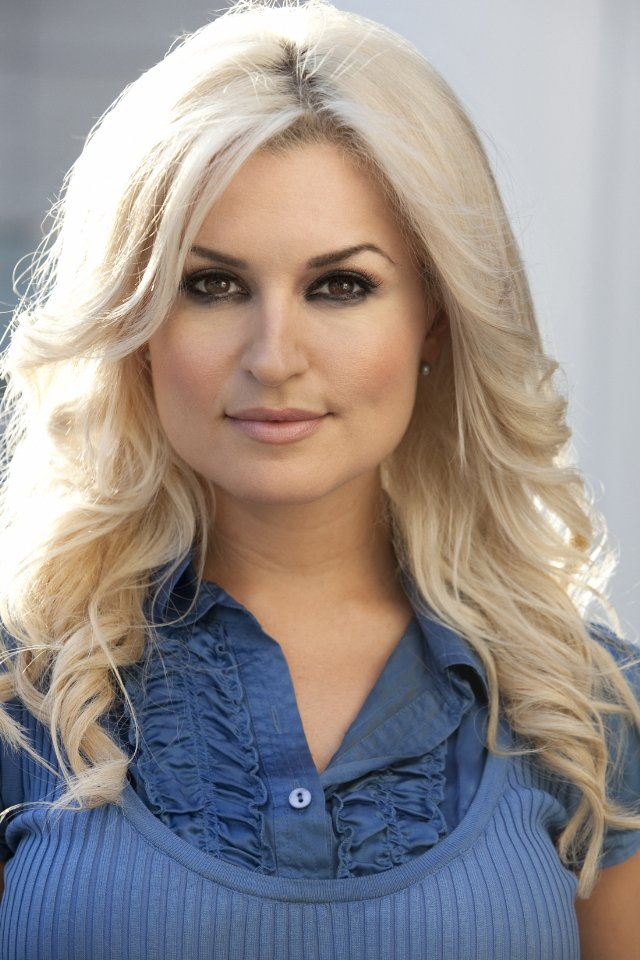
- Marini in 2010
- Born: Winnipeg, Manitoba, Canada
- Education: York University; American Academy of Dramatic Arts
- Occupation: Actress

Mara Marini is a Canadian actress best known for her recurring role as Brandi Maxxxx in the NBC comedy series Parks and Recreation. She has performed in several independent films and plays in the Los Angeles theater scene, as well as making other television appearances.

== Early life ==
Mara Marini was born in Winnipeg, Manitoba, and had wanted to be an actress since the age of four. She was accepted to the University of Hawaii for marine biology, but ultimately attended York University in Toronto. After graduating, she auditioned for and was accepted to the American Academy of Dramatic Arts in Los Angeles, where she moved to study acting.

== Career ==
Marini appeared in a number of independent films starting in the mid-2000s, particularly horror films, including In The Dark (2004), Slaughterhouse Phi: Death Sisters (2006), Darkworld (2006), Blood Legend (2006), Gothic Vampires from Hell (2007) and Munch (2008). She has also experimented with stand-up comedy.

Marini, who had some theater experience in Canada, started performing on stage in the Los Angeles area, and became an active member of The Road Theatre Company. Among her credits with that company in 2007 was "Biblio," a Wayne Peter Liebman one-act play about a girl whose psychological issues invoke a barrage of images, including a Marilyn Monroe character portrayed by Marini. Also in 2007, she appeared in "Bitch", a dark comedy by Susan Rubin that played at the Bootleg Theater. Marini portrayed a giddy receptionist who has an affair with one of the main characters, a hedonistic public relations firm partner. In 2008, she appeared in a Road Theatre production of "The Friendly Hour" at the Road Theatre, playing one of a group of South Dakota housewives whose life stories are told over a 73-year period.

Marini appeared in the 2008 horror short film Deader Living Through Chemistry, a horror short film about zombies that appeared on the DVD release of George A. Romero's film Diary of the Dead. In 2009, Marini performed in a 15-week run of "Bram Stoker's Dracula" at the NoHo Theatre in Los Angeles, directed by Ken Sawyer. She portrayed Mina Harker, although on rare occasions she served as an understudy for the Lucy Westenra role. Marini received positive reviews; in a review of one of her Lucy performances, Culture Spot LA writer Julie Riggott said she "made a convincing transformation from meek innocent to voluptuous vampire". Robert Machray of BlogCritics.org wrote she "should get an award for her bloodcurdling screams".

Marini had a supporting role in the 2009 film Ballistica, and played a Texan art dealer in the film The Back-Up Bride (2010). She appeared in the film Psychosomatika (2010) after director Jeff Graham, who directed her in Blood Legend, contacted her and asked her to audition for a role. Also in 2010 she appeared in comedy sketches for the E! late night talk show Chelsea Lately, and a commercial for the website Vevo with American Idol runner-up Adam Lambert. Marini filmed a number of television pilots around this time, including ones for the Spike and the Oxygen channels.

Marini was cast in a guest appearance in the NBC comedy series Parks and Recreation as Brandi Maxxxx, a pornographic film actress. Marini had previously participated in a workshop with Dorian Frankel, the show's casting director, before auditioning for the Brandi Maxxxx role. Marini was concerned she didn't do her best at the audition, but was nevertheless chosen for the role. She first appeared in the third season episode "Jerry's Painting", which originally aired on April 28, 2011. In the episode, Brandi appears on a television news program along with Leslie Knope (Amy Poehler) in which Leslie is defending a painting that depicts her as a centaur with her breasts exposed. While Leslie defends the artistic merit of the painting, Brandi defends the painting while simultaneously comparing it to pornography, unwittingly undermining Leslie's arguments. Marini later reprised the role in the fourth season episode "The Debate", where Brandi Maxxxx ran for city council against Leslie and participated in a political debate against Bobby Newport (Paul Rudd) and two other candidates.

Marini returned to the stage in 2011, appearing in the Laurel Ollstein comedy "Esther's Moustache" at the Studio/Stage Theatre in Los Angeles. The play was about a female artist who draws magazine cartoons of beautiful goddesses, and Marini played Lilith, a sex-obsessed imaginary goddess who appears before the protagonist as her alter ego. She received positive reviews for the performance. LA Weekly writer Steven Leigh Morris called her a "scene-stealer", and the Los Angeles Times called her "an amusingly empty-headed statuesque siren". Natalia Evdikimova of Culver City News wrote that Marini was "superbly cast" and "hard to ignore", adding: "Mara Marini is everything that a sex-loving goddess should be: bossy, sassy and provocative". In 2011, Marini also appeared in the ABC legal drama series The Whole Truth, and that show's casting director called her for auditions in several other television roles.

Marini appeared in the 2012 film Sushi Girl, reuniting Marini with director Kern Saxton, who directed her in Deader Living Through Chemistry. Marini also portrayed Gloria, who she described as a "Marilyn Monroe-type scarlet-wannabe", in the 2013 film Rock and Roll: The Movie. She also has filmed performances for the upcoming films Alongside the Night and King of the Road.

== Filmography ==
Year	Title	Role	Notes
2004	In the Dark	Blair	
2006	Pieces of Eight	Ophelia	
2006	Blood Legend	Virgin Mary	video
2006	Slaughterhouse Phi: Death Sisters	Candace	video
2006	Darkworld	Faith	
2007	Porntourage	Trixxxi	short film
2007	Gothic Videos from Hell	Rayne	video
2008	Lady Magdalene's	Nurse Gretchen	
2008	Munch	Girl on date	short film
2008	Another Life	Pauline Kincaid	short film
2009	Paranormal, Burbank	Shirleen	TV series (one episode)
2009	Firmly Legal	Cindy	TV series (three episodes)
2009	Ballistica	Veronica	
2009–10	We Have to Stop Now	Christy	TV series (two episodes)
2010	Psychosomatika	Mercedes	
2010	Lien on Me	Jessica	TV series (one episode)
2011	Love, Gloria	Bazooka Jane	
2011	Textually Active	Angelica	short
2011	The Whole Truth	Denise Crandall	TV series (one episode)
2011	Married in a Year	Tracy	
2011	The Back-up Bride	Christee-Lee	
2011	2011 Hero Dog Awards	Matchmaker's assistant	television movie
2011–15	Parks and Recreation	Brandi Maxxxx	TV series (five episodes)
2012	The Wife Master	Pou Chum's Girlfriend #1	
2012	Night of the Dead	Brandy	video
2012	Chicks Dig Gay Guys	Alyssa	
2013	Rock and Roll: The Movie	Gloria	
2013	Alongside Night	Candy	
2015	Black-ish	Shawn	TV series (one episode)
2015	Schitt's Creek	Justine St. Pierre	TV series (one episode)
2019	Grand-Daddy Day Care	Bev	
2023	Doogie Kameāloha, M.D.	Mel	TV series (one episode)
