= How to Be Perfect =

2022 non-fiction book by Michael Schur

How to Be Perfect: The Correct Answer to Every Moral Question
- Front cover
- Author: Michael Schur
- Language: English
- Genre: Non-fiction
- Publisher: Simon & Schuster
- Publication date: 2022
- Publication place: United States
- Media type: Print, e-book
- Pages: 304 pages
- ISBN: 1982159316

How to Be Perfect: The Correct Answer to Every Moral Question is a 2022 non-fiction book by American television producer and author Michael Schur. The book provides an introduction to many philosophical arguments on the concept of ethics, told largely in layman's terms and in a humorous tone. Schur had done extensive research into the subject for his television show The Good Place, and following its conclusion decided to write the book to summarize and pass along much of what he had learned. The book was well-received by some critics, with The New York Times Book Review calling it "a perfect starter course in analyzing why human beings do what we do".

== Background ==
Schur, who had previously worked as an executive producer on television shows such as Parks and Recreation and Brooklyn Nine-Nine, got the idea for a show based around moral philosophy when he was once stuck in traffic. He witnessed motorists using the emergency lane to bypass the traffic jam, and conceived a world where such acts deducted "points" from a person's morality score. The idea of an ethical score sheet eventually led to his creation of The Good Place, a show in which a numerical score calculated on one's deeds in life determines which afterlife – the Good Place or Bad Place – one is sent to after death. The show saw success both commercially and critically and aired for four seasons on NBC.

Following the end of the show's run, Schur did not feel finished discussing the topic of ethics, and decided a book would work to continue with the subject in a different medium. Schur believed that his background as a comedy writer gave him the opportunity to make material that has historically been written in an opaque style more accessible and engaging. He recruited the assistance of political philosopher Todd May, who had worked as a consultant on The Good Place, and who receives credit on the book's title page for being in charge of "philosophical nitpicking". The resulting book has been called a "companion piece" to the television show.

== Synopsis ==
The book's format parallels that of many introductory textbooks on ethics, with individual chapters summarizing separate philosophical arguments on morality. Schur eschews the standard dry tone of philosophy texts, however, opting instead for a narrator who is funny and passionate. He states that the book seeks to "wade into some deeply confusing and painful applications of moral philosophy ... But in a fun way!"

The book's thirteen chapters aim to provide contemporary context to philosophical debates that, in some cases, have gone on for centuries. It begins with a relatively straightforward question – the first chapter is titled "Should I Punch My Friend in the Face for No Reason?" – and progresses through more and more complex ethical conundrums and their respective arguments. Schur covers utilitarianism, deontology, existentialism, virtue ethics, and more, all while wryly bemoaning the original authors' "infuriatingly dense prose", including one paper he calls a "seventy-five-page-long migraine". Schur deliberately uses a light tone and humorous anecdotes to make the subject material more "palatable" for a broad audience; a sort of "honey on the medicine cup" intended to keep readers' attentions. Schur also discusses what he calls "moral exhaustion", a term he uses to describe the sense of fatigue that can arise when people try to scrutinize every purchase, relationship, or social interaction for its ethical ripple effects. He argues that acknowledging this exhaustion can itself be a first step toward building more realistic and compassionate moral habits.

After introducing the basic philosophical arguments and then applying them to potential real-world situations, Schur concludes by attempting to explain the actual importance of moral philosophy in our day-to-day lives. He argues that perfection is unrealistic, and that trying to attain it robs one of enjoying life and its pleasures. Rather, people would be better off striving to live more ethical lives, using pieces of the various philosophical viewpoints as a collective moral guide. Schur encourages the reader to be constantly and willingly trying to learn, develop, and become better people.

== Reception ==
How to Be Perfect debuted at the second spot on The New York Times Best Seller list and received mostly positive reviews. Julian Baggini, writing for The Wall Street Journal, compared it favorably to the "comedy gold" of The Good Place, and said the book is "an enjoyable next step" for fans of that show and "for anyone else who wants to learn about moral philosophy while avoiding the usual dry earnestness." The New York Times Book Review called it "clear and approachable" and especially praised the audiobook version, the cast of which includes Kristen Bell, Ted Danson, Manny Jacinto, and Jameela Jamil of The Good Place. The Los Angeles Review of Books, while calling it a "remarkably companionable book", proposed that Schur's use of "ironic humor" may cause a reader to be unsure of when to take him at his word and when he is being tongue-in-cheek. The Times Literary Supplement called Schur "engaging company" but admits "some may find the brash comedic tone jarring".
