= Bowling for Votes =

- Parks and Recreation episode
- Episode no.: Season 4 Episode 13
- Directed by: Michael Trim
- Written by: Katie Dippold
- Original air date: January 26, 2012

Guest appearances
- Kevin Dorff as Derek; Sarah Wright as Millicent Gergich

Episode chronology
| ← Previous "Campaign Ad" | Next → "Operation Ann" |
- Parks and Recreation season 4

"Bowling for Votes" is the thirteenth episode of the fourth season of the American comedy television series Parks and Recreation, and the 59th overall episode of the series. It originally aired on NBC in the United States on January 26, 2012.

In the episode, Leslie (Amy Poehler) has her campaign host a bowling night just to win the vote of a man who does not like her, while the rest of her staff hits the phones to raise money.

== Plot ==
Leslie's campaign holds a focus group about her, and one participant named Derek says he won't vote for Leslie because she doesn't look like someone he could go bowling with. An offended Leslie becomes determined to win Derek's vote by having her campaign hold a bowling night, although Ben tries to explain there will be voters who simply won't like her. Meanwhile, Jerry organizes an all-night campaign fundraising event at Andy and April's house, with two movie tickets going to the person who raises the most money. Chris wants to win so he can take his girlfriend Millicent (Jerry's daughter) out, and April wants to win just to make the optimistic Chris sad.

At the bowling night, Tom embarrasses Ron and Ann with his childlike bowling technique, but it proves very effective and he scores higher than Ron; Tom later injures his finger when getting his ball and it is unclear if Ron let the accident happen out of jealousy. Leslie challenges Derek to a game of bowling and lets him win while giving him free food and beer. He still refuses to vote for Leslie, angering her and challenging him to a rematch that she wins. An angry Derek calls Leslie a "bitch", resulting in Ben punching him. A smitten Leslie kisses Ben over a bloody Derek, of which a newspaper photographer takes a picture.

Chris, who is well in the fundraising lead, announces that he is going to ask Millicent to move in with him, but Jerry privately reveals to everyone else that Millicent is planning to end the relationship; she later shows up and does so, causing Chris to leave. April wins the tickets, but feels guilty that her wish to see Chris sad came true. The next day, she buys a third ticket and offers a depressed Chris to join her and Andy at the movies, giving him a quick hug. Leslie refuses to accept Ben's resignation over the punch and holds a press conference to apologize to Derek, but she tells the reporters that she won't apologize because Derek was a jerk and Ben was right to defend her honor. At a focus group about the press conference, the participants give Leslie very favorable opinions.

Ron later returns to the bowling alley in disguise and tries out Tom's technique, bowling a perfect game.

== Reception ==
Critical reaction towards the episode was mostly positive. Christopher Peck of Blast Magazine called the episode "awesome," and drew connections between Leslie's arc in the episode and the show overall. Said Peck, "No one can ever accuse the ensemble of 'Parks and Recreation' of being inauthentic." He ultimately gave the episode an A−. Matt Fowler of IGN liked the episode, especially Ben's punch and the group booing Jerry after Millicent broke up with Chris. But, he did note that Leslie's hyper-focus, just like in the episode "Citizen Knope", can be draining. He ultimately gave the episode an 8 out of 10, or a "Great."

The episode was viewed by 3.49 million people. This marks not only a decrease from the previous episode, but makes it the lowest-viewed episode of the entire series.
