= Parks and Recreation season 4 =

Season of television series

Parks and Recreation
- Season 4
- Region 1 DVD cover art
- Showrunner: Michael Schur
- Starring: Amy Poehler; Rashida Jones; Aziz Ansari; Nick Offerman; Aubrey Plaza; Chris Pratt; Adam Scott; Rob Lowe; Jim O'Heir; Retta
- No. of episodes: 22

Release
- Original network: NBC
- Original release: September 22, 2011 – May 8, 2012

Season chronology
- ← Previous; Season 3 Next → Season 5

The fourth season of Parks and Recreation originally aired in the United States on the NBC television network, and began on September 22, 2011, and ended on May 8, 2012. The season contained 22 episodes. It stars Amy Poehler, Rashida Jones, Aziz Ansari, Nick Offerman, Aubrey Plaza, Chris Pratt, Adam Scott, and Rob Lowe, with supporting performances from Jim O'Heir and Retta.

As with past seasons, it focuses on Leslie Knope (Amy Poehler) and her staff at the parks and recreation department of the fictional Indiana town of Pawnee. However, this season features an overarching story arc, beginning in the first episode and culminating in the finale, where Leslie runs for the city council of Pawnee.

== Cast ==
=== Main ===
- Amy Poehler as Leslie Knope, a mid-level bureaucrat with a strong love of her home town of Pawnee, who has not let politics dampen her sense of optimism; her ultimate goal is to become President of the United States. Poehler departed from the NBC sketch comedy series Saturday Night Live, where she was a cast member for nearly seven years, to star in Parks and Recreation. It was only after she was cast that Daniels and Schur established the general concept of the show and the script for the pilot was written.
- Rashida Jones as Ann Perkins, a nurse and political outsider who gradually becomes more involved in Pawnee government through her friendship with Leslie. Jones was among the first to be cast by Daniels and Schur in 2008, when the series was still being considered as a spin-off to The Office, where Jones had played Jim Halpert's girlfriend Karen Filippelli.
- Aziz Ansari as Tom Haverford, Leslie's sarcastic and underachieving subordinate, who eventually begins to consider leaving his city hall job to pursue his own entrepreneurial interests. As with Jones, Daniels and Schur had intended to cast Ansari from the earliest stages of the development of Parks and Recreation.
- Nick Offerman as Ron Swanson, the parks and recreation director who, as a libertarian, believes in as small a government as possible. As such, Ron strives to make his department as ineffective as possible, and favors hiring employees who do not care about their jobs or are poor at them. Nevertheless, Ron consistently demonstrates that he secretly cares deeply about his co-workers.
- Aubrey Plaza as April Ludgate, a cynical and uninterested parks department intern who eventually becomes the perfect assistant for Ron. The role was written specifically for Plaza; after meeting her, casting director Allison Jones told Schur, "I just met the weirdest girl I've ever met in my life. You have to meet her and put her on your show."
- Chris Pratt as Andy Dwyer, a goofy and dim-witted but lovable slacker. Pratt was originally intended to be a guest star and the character Andy was initially meant to appear only in the first season, but the producers liked Pratt so much that, almost immediately after casting him, they decided to make him a regular cast member starting with season two.
- Adam Scott as Ben Wyatt, a brilliant but socially awkward government official trying to redeem his past as a failed mayor in his youth. Scott left his starring role on the Starz comedy series Party Down to join the show.
- Rob Lowe as Chris Traeger, an excessively positive and extremely health-conscious government official. Unlike Scott, Lowe was originally expected to depart after a string of guest appearances, but later signed a multi-year contract to become a regular cast member.

=== Starring ===
- Jim O'Heir as Jerry Gergich, the office scapegoat and overall klutz, with unbelievably attractive daughters and wife.
- Retta as Donna Meagle, who's sassy and savvy and has little patience for stupidity.

=== Recurring ===
- Ben Schwartz as Jean-Ralphio Saperstein
- Jay Jackson as Perd Haply

=== Guest ===
- Pamela Reed as Marlene Griggs-Knope

== Episodes ==
^{†} denotes an extended episode.

Parks and Recreation, season 4 episodes
No. overall	No. in season	Title	Directed by	Written by	Original release date	U.S. viewers (millions)
47	1	"I'm Leslie Knope"	Troy Miller	Dan Goor	September 22, 2011	4.11
Leslie is torn between Ben and her dreams of running for public office, while Ron braces himself for the arrival of his first wife, Tammy One.
48	2	"Ron and Tammys"	Randall Einhorn	Norm Hiscock	September 29, 2011	4.33
Leslie is pulled into Ron's personal life as Tammy One (Patricia Clarkson) exerts malevolent influence on him, and seeks out help from Ron's mother, "Tammy Zero". Tom tasks Ben with helping out with his grossly mismanaged new company, while Ann and Chris team up for a public service announcement about diabetes.
49	3	"Born & Raised"	Dean Holland	Aisha Muharrar	October 6, 2011	4.15
Promoting a book she has written about Pawnee, Leslie falls victim to Joan Callamezzo's "Gotcha!" journalism, but also learns a horrifying fact about her personal history. Tom's flirting with Joan takes a disturbing turn, while Ann strives fruitlessly to make Ron and April enjoy chatting with her.
50	4	"Pawnee Rangers"	Charles McDougall	Alan Yang	October 13, 2011	3.99
Ron and Leslie get into a feud over their rival youth camp programs, with Ron's spartan Pawnee Rangers up against Leslie's supportive and indulgent Pawnee Goddesses. Tom and Donna invite Ben – still despondent over his breakup with Leslie – to their annual "Treat Yo' Self" spa and shopping excursion. Jerry takes his daughter and Chris to lunch together.
51	5	"Meet n Greet"	Wendey Stanzler	Katie Dippold	October 27, 2011	3.90
Ben is mad when Andy and April decide to throw a Halloween party at their house without asking him. Tom emcees an event for Leslie’s campaign but manages to also promote his company. Meanwhile, Ron and Ann give Andy and April an unusual wedding present.
52	6	"End of the World"^{†}	Dean Holland	Michael Schur	November 3, 2011	4.00
A local Pawnee group, The Reasonabilists (aka "Zorpies", members of a cult who follow "Zorp the Surveyor"), predicts that the end of the world is coming, causing Leslie and others to contemplate their lives. Tom decides to throw the best party ever before he loses his office space, while April helps Andy complete his "bucket list" before the world ends.
53	7	"The Treaty"	Jorma Taccone	Harris Wittels	November 10, 2011	3.66
Leslie and Ben are excited about the opportunity to lead a Model United Nations conference, but their post-dating relationship becomes the major crisis of the event. Elsewhere, Andy and April uniquely lend a helping hand at the conference; Ron goes the extra mile to try and convince a reluctant Tom to return to his government post; and Chris enlists advice from Ann, Donna, and an uneasy Jerry to find out why Millie isn't returning his calls.
54	8	"Smallest Park"	Nicole Holofcener	Chelsea Peretti	November 17, 2011	3.68
Leslie attempts to delay completion of Indiana's smallest park in order to spend more time with Ben before he transfers out of the parks department. Andy goes back to college with Ron and April's support, and Chris tasks Tom and Jerry with designing a new logo.
55	9	"The Trial of Leslie Knope"	Dean Holland	Dan Goor & Michael Schur	December 1, 2011	3.69
Leslie and Ben finally tell Chris about their relationship, leading to Leslie's trial by the board to see whether she took advantage of him to get ahead. Ann, Ron, April, Andy, Donna, and Jerry sit in as witnesses to help prove her innocence, while Chris becomes their enemy.
56	10	"Citizen Knope"	Randall Einhorn	Dave King	December 8, 2011	3.64
When Chris bans a suspended Leslie from trying to do her job in any way, Leslie becomes a super-organizer for citizen-based projects in Pawnee. The entire staff endeavors to create the most thoughtful present for Leslie they can think of, in order to pay her back for her many years of unprecedentedly thoughtful presents. Ben Wyatt goes on distressing private sector job interviews before getting good advice from a surprising source. Leslie's City Council campaign suffers crippling losses–until her friends and colleagues unite anew to help her out.
57	11	"The Comeback Kid"	Tucker Gates	Mike Scully	January 12, 2012	4.09
Leslie must ask for help in order to stage a major event to re-establish her campaign. Ben uses his new-found free time to explore new hobbies, alarming Chris with their uselessness and causing him to step in and help. April and Andy adopt a new pet dog, without consulting Ben.
58	12	"Campaign Ad"	Dean Holland	Alan Yang	January 19, 2012	4.25
The race for City Council is shaken up by the entry of Bobby Newport (Paul Rudd), the wealthy and good-natured but dumb and incompetent son of the town's largest employer, as a candidate. Leslie and Ben have a fight over the tone of their campaign ads. Chris tries to befriend Ron, making him uncomfortable. Andy and April visit the doctor. Bobby later whines to Leslie about the mean ad and alternately asks her to drop out of the race and to do his job for him after he wins; Leslie says no to both "offers".
59	13	"Bowling for Votes"	Michael Trim	Katie Dippold	January 26, 2012	3.49
Leslie and Ben host a bowling night after receiving feedback about Leslie's campaign. Leslie chases one vote in particular, culminating in punches being thrown. April, Chris, and Jerry hold a competition to see who can raise the most funds. Ron and Ann are embarrassed by Tom's childlike bowling technique in contrast to Ron's straightforward technique and Ann's terrible technique.
60	14	"Operation Ann"	Morgan Sackett	Aisha Muharrar	February 2, 2012	3.60
Leslie works to find Ann a Valentine's date, but finds only run-of-the-mill strange Pawneeans, while April provides a surprising assist. Ron helps Ben with Leslie's difficult Valentine's scavenger hunt, and Chris becomes depressed over his love life.
61	15	"Dave Returns"	Robert B. Weide	Harris Wittels	February 16, 2012	3.45
Leslie and Ben run into Dave (Louis C.K.) while meeting with the Chief of Police. Andy searches for a song to represent Leslie's campaign.
62	16	"Sweet Sixteen"	Michael Schur	Norm Hiscock	February 23, 2012	3.43
After realizing everyone forgot Jerry's birthday (February 29), Leslie decides to throw him a party; Tom is shocked to learn Ann doesn't share his taste in music.
63	17	"Campaign Shake-Up"	Dan Goor	Dan Goor	March 1, 2012	3.77
Bobby Newport hires a new campaign manager, Jennifer Barkley (Kathryn Hahn). Leslie courts the support of a powerful Pawnee senior citizen (Carl Reiner). Chris informs Ron that if Leslie wins city council, a new deputy director will have to be hired. To prevent this, Ron enlists Ann to take over the department on a water fountain project. However, the conflict between April and Ann, combined with Tom's extravagance, Jerry's incompetence, Donna's reluctance, and Andy's overexcited-ness culminates in a department-wide water-balloon war and forces someone to step up.
64	18	"Lucky"	Troy Miller	Nick Offerman	March 8, 2012	3.66
Indianapolis journalist Buddy Wood (Sean Hayes) selects Leslie as one of the local candidates whom he profiles in an annual special. Andy prepares for his final women's studies exam, and both Ron and Chris take an interest in his professor.
65	19	"Live Ammo"	Tristram Shapeero	Dave King & Chelsea Peretti	April 19, 2012	3.46
Leslie discovers that the Parks Department budget is about to be cut, and she later meets the City Council member (Bradley Whitford) she is running to replace. Chris and Ron visit a meditation center. A political ally tells Chris that his support of Leslie is now well-known, and a Bobby Newport win will result in Chris being fired.
66	20	"The Debate"^{†}	Amy Poehler	Amy Poehler	April 26, 2012^{[a]}	3.17
Leslie and Bobby Newport hold a debate.
67	21	"Bus Tour"^{†}	Dean Holland	Aisha Muharrar & Alan Yang	May 3, 2012^{[a]}	3.26
The father of Bobby Newport dies suddenly while Leslie is on a critical campaign swing through the city. Andy tries to figure out who pie-faced Jerry a few nights earlier, believing the target to be Leslie.
68	22	"Win, Lose, or Draw"^{†}	Michael Schur	Michael Schur	May 10, 2012^{[a]}	3.42
It's election day for Leslie, and Ben is contemplating an offer to help work on a campaign in Washington. Meanwhile, Andy tries to help April rescue the files she deleted from the Parks Department computers.

^{a} Episodes 20–22 premiered on Citytv two days prior to airing on NBC. The NBC airdates and ratings are listed.

== Production and broadcast ==
Most of the fourth season aired in the Thursday 8:30 time slot. It was put on a month-long hiatus in March 2012 to make room in the schedule for Community and 30 Rock. It resumed in April after the conclusion of Up All Night, taking its Thursday 9:30 time slot.

Series co-creator Michael Schur revealed in March 2012 that three different season endings were filmed because "we want to make sure that the one we are choosing is the right [one] and we reserve the right to change our minds and also partly just to confuse people," he said, adding that "there may be a last-minute switch".

== Reception ==
Like the two previous seasons, the fourth season of Parks and Recreation received highly positive reviews. On the review aggregate website Rotten Tomatoes, 100 percent of 20 critic reviews are positive with an average rating of 8.6/10. The website's critical consensus reads, "Leslie Knope runs for City Council while Parks and Recreation runs its own campaign as one of the very best sitcoms on television, making a persuasive case with consistent hilarity and an ample dose of heart."

Alan Sepinwall of HitFix said the fourth season was "funny and touching in all the best Parks and Rec ways." Some of the more critically acclaimed episodes of the season included "The Debate" and "Win, Lose, or Draw". Matt Fowler of IGN said in regard to the finale that "Parks and Recreation continues its streak of leaving a season on a strong note with "Win, Lose or Draw" - an episode that hit the right spots comedically while also, you know, sneaking up on me emotionally." The fourth season also received three Primetime Emmy Award nominations; Lead Actress in a Comedy Series for Amy Poehler, and Outstanding Writing in a Comedy Series for the episodes "The Debate" (also for Poehler) and "Win, Lose, or Draw" for Michael Schur.
