= Josh Pence =

American actor (born 1982)

- Born: Joshua Charles Pence; June 8, 1982 (age 44); Santa Monica, California, U.S.
- Education: Dartmouth College
- Occupation: Actor
- Years active: 2006–present

Joshua Charles Pence (born June 8, 1982) is an American actor. He studied economics at Dartmouth College from 2000–2004.

== Career ==
Pence first appeared in the 2006 film The Good Shepherd in an uncredited role as Bonesman. Pence appeared in the 2010 film The Social Network as Tyler Winklevoss, alongside Armie Hammer. Pence played the part of Tyler Winklevoss during filming and Hammer's face was grafted onto Pence's body in post-production to create the illusion of identical twins. Split-screen photography was also used. He also played Cameron Winklevoss in certain scenes, for particular setups. Pence also appears in a separate cameo role elsewhere in the film.

In 2012, Pence portrayed a naval petty officer in the film Battleship, alongside Liam Neeson (with whom he previously worked with when he portrayed Young Ra's al Ghul in Christopher Nolan's film The Dark Knight Rises).

In June 2012, Pence signed on as an ambassador to global aid agency Mercy Corps, blogging for The Huffington Post about his first trip to Haiti.

Pence also appeared in the 2013 crime film Gangster Squad as Daryl Gates, as well as the projected #1 pick in Ivan Reitman’s 2014 sports drama film Draft Day.

Pence was part of the main cast of Freeform‘s spin-off of The Fosters, Good Trouble. He played Dennis.

== Personal life ==
Since August 2017, Pence has been in a relationship with actress and musician AJ Michalka.

== Filmography ==
=== Film ===
Year	Title	Role	Notes
2006	The Good Shepherd	Bonesman	Uncredited
2009	Wish	Thomas	Short film
2009	The Things We Carry	Lance	
2010	The Social Network	Tyler Winklevoss double	
2012	Battleship	Chief Moore	
2012	The Silent Thief	Alex Nixon	
2012	The Dark Knight Rises	Young Ra's al Ghul	
2012	Fun Size	Keevin	
2013	Gangster Squad	Daryl Gates	
2013	In Lieu of Flowers	Eric	
2013	Here and Now	Man	Short film
2014	Draft Day	Bo Callahan	
2014	Thirst	Billy	Short film
2014	The Algerian	Patrick	
2016	Victor	Jimmy	
2016	La La Land	Josh	

=== Television ===
Year	Title	Role	Notes
2007	Super Sweet 16: The Movie	Abercrombie	Television film
2008	CSI: NY	Bartender	Episode: "DOA for a Day"
2008	CSI: Miami	AJ Watkins	Episode: "Wrecking Crew"
2010	The Gates	Henry	Episode: "Digging the Dirt"
2011	Parks and Recreation	Cowboy	Episode: "Soulmates"
2015	Revenge	Tony Hughes	4 episodes
2016	American Horror Story: Hotel	Nick Harley	Episode: "Battle Royale"
2016–2018	The Man in the High Castle	Hans	4 episodes
2019–2024	Good Trouble	Dennis	Main role
2019	Jett	Ray Brewer	Episode: "Bennie"
