= Jerry's Painting =

- Parks and Recreation episode
- Episode no.: Season 3 Episode 11
- Directed by: Dean Holland
- Written by: Norm Hiscock
- Original air date: April 28, 2011

Guest appearances
- Mark Colson as Head Chairman; Jozef Fahey as Art Patron; Darlene Hunt as Marcia Langman; Eric Isenhower as Orin; Jay Jackson as Perd Hapley; Mara Marini as Brandi Maxxxx; Biff Yaeger as Lenny

Episode chronology
← Previous "Soulmates"	Next → "Eagleton"
- Parks and Recreation season 3

"Jerry's Painting" is the eleventh episode of the American comedy television series Parks and Recreation's third season, and the 41st overall episode of the series. It originally aired on NBC in the United States on April 28, 2011. In the episode, Jerry creates a painting of a topless Greek goddess that resembles Leslie, and Leslie tries to protect it from a conservative activist who wants it banned. Meanwhile, Ben moves in with Andy and April, then tries to teach them how to live like adults.

The episode was written by Norm Hiscock and directed by Dean Holland. The original broadcast ran 10 minutes longer than usual because it followed an extended episode of The Office, which featured the last appearance by lead actor Steve Carell. "Jerry's Painting" featured appearances by recurring guest stars Darlene Hunt as activist Marcia Langman, and Jay Jackson as reporter Perd Hapley. Mara Marini also portrayed Brandi Maxxxx, a porn star who publicly defends the painting.

Nielsen ratings were expected to be high for "Jerry's Painting" due to the lead-in from The Office. However, it was only seen by an estimated 4.71 million household viewers, a drop from the previous episode, "Soulmates". The episode received generally positive reviews.

KUAM aired the episode on Sunday, May 1, 2011, due to The Royal Wedding, which aired the next morning on most NBC Stations, preempting the episode.

== Plot ==
Leslie feels powerless at work because a policy by Chris forbidding workplace romances is preventing her from dating Ben. Meanwhile, now that he is staying in Pawnee permanently, Ben decides to move out of the motel where he has been living. Andy and April offer him a spare room in their house, since their previous roommate moved out and left the house to them. Although the two have been living by themselves for only a week, the house is a complete mess with no everyday items like plates or utensils available. Ben decides to teach a reluctant Andy and April how to properly live like adults.

Meanwhile, the parks employees attend an art show exhibiting paintings that will later be hung in government buildings. Jerry displays his painting of the fictional topless centaur Greek goddess Diaphena, which looks exactly like Leslie. Jerry explains he subconsciously painted Leslie while thinking about powerful women. Instead of being embarrassed, Leslie feels empowered by the painting. Tom, however, is humiliated because a pot-bellied cherub in the painting shares his likeness. The next day, local conservative activist Marcia Langman compares the painting to bestiality, deems it unsuitable for a government setting and demands it be destroyed.

Leslie goes on the news program "Ya' Heard? with Perd" to rouse public support for the painting by portraying it as a depiction of a powerful woman. However, she is undermined when reporter Perd Hapley also has on pornographic film actress Brandi Maxxxx, who defends the painting by comparing it to pornography. Chris convenes a meeting of the Pawnee Public Arts Commission to rule on whether the painting is acceptable. Despite Leslie's eloquent defense, the commission fears the nudity is offensive and decides to destroy it instead of risking public backlash. Leslie instead steals the painting and runs away. Meanwhile, after cleaning up around the house, Ben gives Andy and April money to buy common household items. Although they almost waste their money on frivolous items (including many As seen on TV items), Andy insists they need to take Ben's advice. April admits she is afraid of growing up because she does not want them to lose their unique personalities, but Andy assures her they will not change.

Chris angrily demands Leslie bring the painting to city hall the next day to be destroyed. When Leslie reluctantly agrees to do so, Jerry expresses disappointment that she would give up so easily. Feeling empowered again, Leslie asks Jerry to quickly paint another, similar painting, only this time with Tom as the centaur. Leslie tells Marcia the new painting is the original one but painted over. With no more nudity in the painting, a frustrated Marcia gives up her quest to have the painting destroyed. Tom is delighted with the painting until he realizes that Jerry forgot to draw a penis on the centaur. Ben later confides to Andy he likes Leslie but is unable to ask her out because of Chris, but Andy tells him if they truly care about each other, then it will eventually happen.

== Production ==
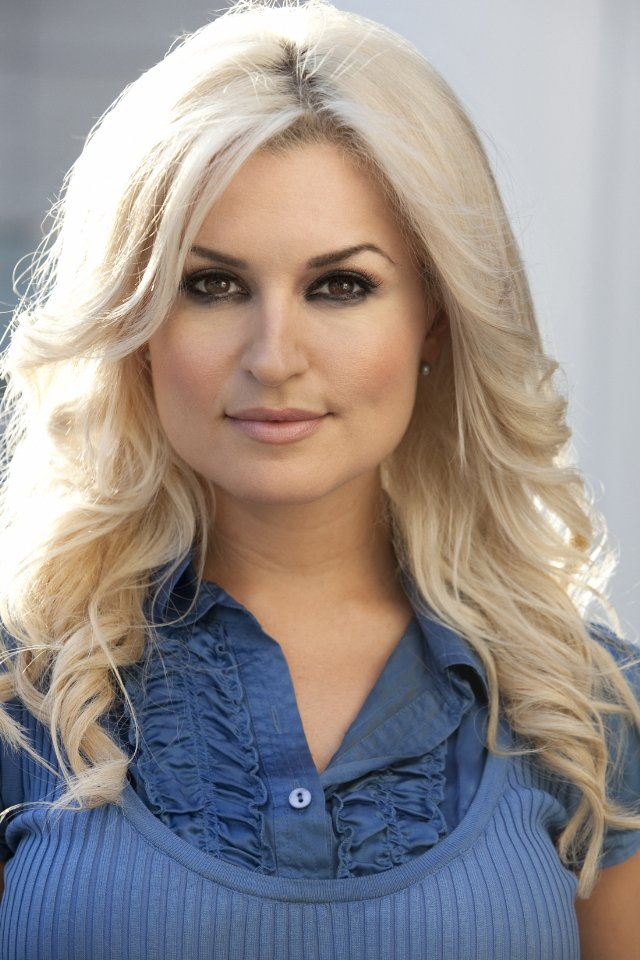
Mara Marini (pictured) made her first of six Parks and Recreation guest appearances, as porn star Brandi Maxxxx, in "Jerry's Painting".

"Jerry's Painting" was written by Norm Hiscock and directed by Dean Holland. During its original broadcast, the episode ran for an extended 40 minutes rather than the usual 30 minutes. The extra time was due to an extended episode of The Office that ran before Parks and Recreation: "Goodbye, Michael", which featured the final appearance of Steve Carell as a regular cast member playing Michael Scott. "Jerry's Painting" featured a guest appearance by Darlene Hunt as Marcia Langman, a member of the conservative group the Society for Family Stability Foundation. Hunt's character has previously appeared in past Parks and Recreation episodes to object to Leslie's actions: in the second season premiere "Pawnee Zoo" she condemned Leslie's same-sex wedding ceremony of two male penguins, and in the third season episode "Time Capsule" she argued against Leslie including the novel Twilight in a Pawnee time capsule because she felt it was anti-Christian. "Jerry's Painting" also featured Jay Jackson in his recurring role as Pawnee journalist Perd Hapley, and Mara Marini as Hapley's guest, porn star Brandi Maxxxx.

== Cultural references ==
During one scene at the art show, a character named Orin stands in front of a blank canvas and stares straight ahead without moving. This style of art exhibition is similar to that of Marina Abramović, a Yugoslavian performance artist who sits or stands silently and immobile at some of her art exhibits. After seeing herself as a goddess in Jerry's painting, Leslie starts responding when people nickname her Aphrodite, the Greek goddess of love, beauty and sexuality. While speaking to Ben, Tom describes his seduction ritual with women as turning the lights off with the Clapper, a sound-activated electrical light switch, and then putting on music by Boyz II Men, an R&B vocal group. This was previously demonstrated in the second-season finale "Freddy Spaghetti", when the group's song "On Bended Knee" was playing while Tom has his girlfriend at his apartment.

While stressing over Chris' policy of not dating co-workers, Ann offers to help Leslie relax by getting her a prescription for Paxil, an antidepressant drug. Ben gives Andy and April cash and instructs them to buy home products at Bed Bath & Beyond, a chain of domestic merchandise retail stores. While there, Andy and April instead start to purchase several "as seen on TV" items, including Shake Weight dumbbells, Slap Chop kitchen gadgets and a Marshmallow Shooter. During the arts commission meeting, Tom describes himself as a "small, slender man" similar to actor Taye Diggs. In a different scene, Tom expresses anger that Jerry's painting is "killing the Jay-Z vibe" he has long been cultivating, a reference to the hip hop artist.

== Reception ==
=== Ratings ===
Nielsen ratings were expected to be high for "Jerry's Painting" due to a lead-in from Steve Carell's final episode as a regular cast member on The Office. However, in its original American broadcast, the Parks and Recreation episode was seen by an estimated 4.71 million household viewers. This constituted a drop from the previous episode, "Soulmates", which was seen by 4.88 million households. "Jerry's Painting" received a 2.8 rating/4 share among all viewers and a 2.3 rating/6 share among viewers between ages 18 and 49. A rating point represents one percent of the total number of television sets in American households, and a share means the percentage of television sets in use tuned to the program. In its 10 p.m. timeslot, "Jerry's Painting" was outperformed by the CBS police procedural drama The Mentalist, which was seen by 13.1 million household viewers, and the ABC medical drama Private Practice, which was seen by 6.33 million household viewers.

=== Reviews ===
"Jerry's Painting" received generally positive reviews. Entertainment Weekly writer Hillary Busis called the episode "one that may just have been the season's best — and that’s saying something when a show is as consistent as this one". She called the main plotline about the painting "brilliant" and said the subplot with Ben, April and Andy was so funny she hoped they had more pairings in the future. Nick McHatton of TV Fanatic called "Jerry's Painting" one of the strongest episodes of the season, and said he enjoyed seeing Leslie's character so empowered. McHatton also praised seeing April and Andy facing adulthood, writing, "It's something many of us young adults go through and it was nice to see it reflected" in the characters. Scott Meslow of The Atlantic said the show demonstrated how Leslie Knope has developed into a strong and confident character since the "daffy, wide-eyed dreamer" she was in the first season. He also praised the show's "new funniest pairing" of Ben, April and Andy, and said the episode demonstrated that "even this late in the season, the show can still feel surprising and fresh".

New York magazine writer Steve Kendell said "Jerry's Painting" was an excellent episode, and that he appreciated seeing Leslie portrayed in a sexier and more confident way than previous episodes had. Joel Keller of TV Squad said the main story with Leslie was funny, but the subplot was even better. He said it showcased the deadpan comedic talents of Adam Scott, and that April and Andy continue to be an excellent pairing. The A.V. Club writer Claire Zulkey called the episode "a pretty simple episode that got funnier and more quotable as the episode rolled on". She particularly praised Adam Scott's performance but said she did not look forward to the romantic pairing of Scott and Amy Poehler because she feels they lack chemistry. Alan Sepinwall of HitFix said the episode featured great scenes about government inaction and the way small-time media can make a frenzy out of any minor thing. He also praised the subplot with April and Andy, which he said demonstrated how the two characters getting married hasn't at all changed who they are.

Eric Sundermann of Hollywood.com complimented the writers, who he said are able to make consistently strong episodes because they seem to have a perfect understanding of their characters. He also said, "Jerry's Painting" proved Ben's character has comedic potential beyond being Leslie's romantic interest. Zap2it writer Rick Porter said it was not the best of the season, but still "a very solid half-hour of comedy" and that "the show's batting average this season is remarkably high". While Porter praised the main story, he said he found the subplot less entertaining, and did not believe April's character would have acted the way she did or lived in such filthy conditions. Not all reviews were positive. Matt Fowler of IGN said the idea of Jerry subconsciously painting Leslie and Tom was "a bit too absurd", and that the episode did not feature enough of Ron Swanson. Fowler also said he did not enjoy seeing the normally positive Chris taking on an authoritarian role.
