= The Debate (Parks and Recreation) =

- Parks and Recreation episode
- Episode no.: Season 4 Episode 20
- Directed by: Amy Poehler
- Written by: Amy Poehler
- Original air date: April 26, 2012

Guest appearances
- Paul Rudd as Bobby Newport; Kathryn Hahn as Jennifer Barkley; Mo Collins as Joan Callamezzo; Mara Marini as Brandi Maxxxx; Brad Leland as Fester Trim; Jay Jackson as Perd Hapley

Episode chronology
← Previous "Live Ammo"	Next → "Bus Tour"
- Parks and Recreation season 4

"The Debate" is the twentieth episode of the fourth season of the American comedy television series Parks and Recreation, and the 66th overall episode of the series. It originally aired on NBC in the United States on April 26, 2012.

In the episode, Leslie (Amy Poehler) debates Bobby Newport (Paul Rudd) and the other city council candidates.

== Plot ==
It is the day of the debate and Ben Wyatt has everything organized: Chris, Ann, and Tom are the spin team, but Tom is upset because Ann once again broke up with him and she and Chris have been acting very close. Andy and April agree to hold a viewing party of the debate at their house for Leslie's donors, but Andy forgot to pay the cable bill.

At the debate, Leslie is all ready for her planned talking points, but Bobby Newport's campaign manager Jennifer Barkley is oddly calm. Chris tells Ann that he wants to give their relationship another chance, which Tom witnesses and further upsets him, resulting in him lashing out at reporters. The debate begins and the crowd—and moderators Perd Hapley and Joan Callamezzo—are in favor of Bobby (the debate is sponsored by his father's company Sweetums), with Bobby acting innocent, naive, but good-intentioned with Leslie coming off as a bully due to her attacks against him. Also, fellow candidate and former porn star Brandi Maxxxx agrees with most of Leslie's views, making Leslie seem unexceptional. Meanwhile, Andy entertains the donors by acting out scenes from his favorite movies while Ron climbs a telephone pole to illegally obtain cable for the house.

Bobby's broad and unoffensive prepared answers continue to generate applause, but Leslie slowly wins more support from the crowd with her knowledge. Jennifer reveals Bobby has a secret weapon: he soon announces that if Leslie is elected, his father will move Sweetums to Mexico, therefore eliminating Pawnee's biggest employer. Bobby wins the full support of the crowd, sending Ben into a panic. Leslie convinces Ben to let her improvise her closing statements, insisting she can win the debate. In her closing remarks—which Ron repairs the cable in time for—Leslie reprimands Bobby for holding Pawnee hostage for votes in a stirring speech that wins over the crowd, the moderators, and even Bobby himself. Although Ann thinks about getting back with Chris, she decides to remain single, which saddens Chris but makes Tom happy, believing he can eventually win her back. Leslie and Ben celebrate victory, and a jubilant Bobby, who is happy that the debate is over, invites them to his lake house for a party.

== Accolades ==
For her work on this episode, Amy Poehler was nominated for the Primetime Emmy Award for Outstanding Writing for a Comedy Series.
