= Smallest Park (Parks and Recreation) =

- Parks and Recreation episode
- Episode no.: Season 4 Episode 8
- Directed by: Nicole Holofcener
- Written by: Chelsea Peretti
- Original air date: November 17, 2011

Episode chronology
← Previous "The Treaty"	Next → "The Trial of Leslie Knope"
- Parks and Recreation season 4

"Smallest Park" is the eighth episode of the fourth season of the NBC sitcom Parks and Recreation. It originally aired in the United States on November 17, 2011. The episode was written by Chelsea Peretti and directed by Nicole Holofcener.

== Plot ==
After Pawnee removed the last of its pay phones, Leslie Knope and Ben Wyatt turn the patch of concrete where the phones were into the smallest park in Indiana. Still struggling to deal with their breakup, Ben tells Leslie the smallest park will be the last project they work on together. Wanting to spend more time with Ben, Leslie tries to slow down the project, holding a public meeting and later telling local residents the park will host noisy events. After Leslie gets the residents to protest, Ben opens the park and tells Chris Traeger he no longer wants to work with Leslie. Leslie turns to her best friend Ann Perkins who tells Leslie she agrees with Ben that Leslie can be a steam roller. Leslie acknowledges she can be overbearing and tries to change. Leslie asks Ben to meet her at the smallest park where she agrees to respect his feelings and give him his space. Leslie tells Ben there is another option: they can violate Chris' rule forbidding them to date and risk jeopardizing her campaign for city council and start dating again. Ben responds to Leslie's speech by kissing her.

Chris asks Tom Haverford to pick out a new font for the Parks Department's logo and assigns Jerry Gergich to help. Tom is frustrated to be performing menial tasks at the Parks department after his business failed. Jerry enjoys the consistency that government work offers and shares with Tom that he still carries his original employee ID from the 1970s. The ID inspires Tom to use the font from the 1970s for nostalgia.

Andy Dwyer decides to take a college course. April Ludgate and Ron Swanson go with Andy as he tries out various courses including a guitar class for beginners and a class on lasers. Andy finally decides to take a women's studies course, but realizes he can't afford it. Ron offers to pay for Andy's class.

== Reception ==
=== Ratings ===
"Smallest Park" received 3.680 million live and same day views when it first aired on November 17, 2011. The episode received a 2.0 rating among viewers 18–49.

=== Reception ===
Steve Heisler of The A.V. Club gave the episode an A, praising the show for being "unafraid to put everything out there" and leaving the viewer wondering where the show will go next. Matt Fowler of IGN expressed frustration over the Leslie and Ben storyline, although he noted that the episode was funny.
