= Pawnee Rangers =

- Parks and Recreation episode
- Episode no.: Season 4 Episode 4
- Directed by: Charles McDougall
- Written by: Alan Yang
- Original air date: October 13, 2011

Guest appearances
- Sarah Wright as Millicent "Milly" Gergich; Jacob Bertrand as Darren; Kayla M. Simpkins as Casey; Dmitri A. Schuyler as Chignole; Dani Fish as Lauren; Annalise Basso as Abigail; Gavin MacIntosh as Wayne; Adrian Zeigler as DJ Bluntz; Emily Maya Mills as Lisa; Penny L. Moore as Puppy Lady

Episode chronology
← Previous "Born & Raised"	Next → "Meet n Greet"
- Parks and Recreation season 4

"Pawnee Rangers" is the fourth episode of the fourth season of the NBC sitcom Parks and Recreation. Unlike many episodes during the fourth season that focus on Leslie's campaign for city council, this episode hardly even mentions it. "Pawnee Rangers" garnered 3.99 million viewers, a decrease in viewers from the previous episode. The episode was written by Alan Yang and was directed by Charles McDougall.

== Plot ==
Ron Swanson is the leader of a Boy Scout-like group called the Pawnee Rangers, with Andy Dwyer as his assistant. Because the Pawnee Rangers admits boys but not girls, Leslie Knope, along with Ann Perkins and April Ludgate, created the Pawnee Goddesses, which admits girls but not boys. Leslie is determined to prove that her group is better to avenge a girl who was denied admission to the Pawnee Rangers, so she decides to arrange a weekend camping trip for the Goddesses at the same camping ground as the Rangers.

Meanwhile, after noticing that Ben Wyatt is feeling down, Donna Meagle and Tom Haverford invite him on their annual "Treat Yo Self" trip, where they spend a day spending money extravagantly on things they don't need. Jerry Gergich is left alone in the office, so Chris gives him the day off; Jerry invites Chris to have lunch with him and his daughter Millicent "Milly" Gergich. Chris agrees, and is stunned by how beautiful Milly is when he meets her.

The Pawnee Rangers become jealous of the Pawnee Goddesses, who appear to be having a lot more fun on the trip. The Goddesses sleep in a cabin with puppies, pillow fights, and candy, while the Rangers are told to build meager shelter for themselves, with canned beans as their only food. Leslie is glad her efforts to make the boys jealous worked. However, after a public forum, the Goddesses decide to let the Rangers join them. Every Ranger - including Andy - defects to the Goddesses, making Leslie feel sorry when she spots Ron sitting at a campfire all alone. Leslie apologizes for being so competitive, and Ron laments that children no longer want to learn tough survival skills, admitting Leslie has the better group. To make Ron feel better, Leslie takes out an ad in the paper for a new group of self-reliant survivalists called "The Swansons", and Ron is happily surprised to find a group of eager children (girls and boys) in his office ready to join.

Ben is unable to enjoy himself with Tom and Donna, but opens up after Tom and Donna encourage him to splurge on a Batman costume. He starts to cry and tells them that he recently broke up with a woman, without telling them the woman is Leslie. Tom tells Ben to "treat yourself to a good cry".

Chris hits it off with Milly during lunch and tells Jerry that he plans on asking her out on a date and insists on being open with Jerry about their activities. Things take an awkward turn the next day when Chris tells Jerry that the date went well and that Milly spent the night at his house afterwards.

== Reception ==
The episode received mixed to positive reviews. Matt Fowler of IGN claimed that "it was a fun story because we got to see people shift around and find out the places they felt the most comfortable." Steve Heisler of The A.V. Club gave "Pawnee Rangers" a B−, but praised Nick Offerman's performance, saying "there is no more fun character on TV today than Ron Swanson—and though I didn’t love 'Pawnee Rangers,' I still believe that wholeheartedly."
