= Win, Lose, or Draw (Parks and Recreation) =

- Parks and Recreation episode
- Episode no.: Season 4 Episode 22
- Directed by: Michael Schur
- Written by: Michael Schur
- Original air date: May 10, 2012

Guest appearances
- Paul Rudd as Bobby Newport; Kathryn Hahn as Jennifer Barkley; Ben Schwartz as Jean-Ralphio Saperstein; Jay Jackson as Perd Hapley

Episode chronology
← Previous "Bus Tour"	Next → "Ms. Knope Goes to Washington"
- Parks and Recreation season 4

"Win, Lose, or Draw" is the twenty-second episode and season finale of the fourth season of the American comedy television series Parks and Recreation, and the 68th overall episode of the series. It originally aired on NBC in the United States on May 10, 2012.

In the episode, Leslie (Amy Poehler) and the Parks staff await the results of the city council election.

== Plot ==
It is Election Day in Pawnee and Leslie and Bobby Newport are neck-and-neck in the latest poll. Tom is organizing the results party because he had a dream that Ann will get back together with him if she enjoys the party. Bobby's campaign manager Jennifer Barkley, impressed with Leslie's campaign, offers Ben a job working for a congressional reelection campaign in Washington, D.C., but he will need to leave in two days and be there for six months. Ben brings it up with Leslie, who is upset by the news since Ben will move away just as their lives return to normal.

Chris has finally emerged from his depression after having sex numerous times with Jennifer, but he is oblivious that the sex is meaningless to her. At the results party, Jerry – who did not have time to vote – panics when the first few rounds of results give Bobby a slight lead, worrying that Leslie will lose by one vote. Leslie and Ben seek advice about Ben's job offer: Ann suggests Leslie ask Ben to stay, and Ron tells Ben to also remain, citing his own love for routine. Ben reminds him that if Leslie wins, Ron's routine will change since he will become Assistant City Manager. Leslie later asks Ben to stay and he agrees.

The final results are in and Bobby is declared the winner, but Ben correctly says that Bobby's small margin of victory is low enough to trigger an automatic recount. Leslie goes missing but Ron finds her in the city council chambers, where she laments letting her friends down after they worked so hard for her. Ron tells her that he and the parks department joined her campaign because they care about her and her dream, not the reward of winning. Hearing this, Leslie tells Ben he should accept the job. The recount eventually comes in and it is official: Leslie has won, to Leslie's overwhelmed jubilation and Jerry's (and Bobby's) relief. Ben accepts Jennifer's offer and she leaves without saying goodbye to Chris. Ron turns down the Assistant City Manager position, content with his life; Jean-Ralphio asks Chris for the job, but he is turned down immediately. Leslie thanks her friends and supporters with a heartfelt speech; she previously asked Ben about the concession speech that he wrote, but he reveals that he never wrote it. Later, a drunk Ann gets back together with Tom and even agrees to move in with him, fulfilling his dream.

In a B plot, April asks for Andy's help after she accidentally deletes all of the department's files. When their attempts to recover them fail, they jokingly plan to move away, change their identities, and get new careers, with all of Andy's careers revolving around law enforcement (like his often used alter ego, FBI agent Burt Macklin). The day is saved when Donna reveals that she has a back-up copy of the files because Jerry always accidentally deletes files. April later suggests that Andy actually join the police department.

== Accolades ==
Amy Poehler submitted this episode for consideration due to her nomination for the Primetime Emmy Award for Outstanding Lead Actress in a Comedy Series at the 64th Primetime Emmy Awards.

For his work on this episode, Michael Schur was nominated for the Primetime Emmy Award for Outstanding Writing for a Comedy Series.
