= Bus Tour =

- Parks and Recreation episode
- Episode no.: Season 4 Episode 21
- Directed by: Dean Holland
- Written by: Aisha Muharrar; Alan Yang
- Original air date: May 3, 2012

Guest appearances
- Paul Rudd as Bobby Newport; Kathryn Hahn as Jennifer Barkley; Mike O'Malley as Bill

Episode chronology
← Previous "The Debate"	Next → "Win, Lose, or Draw"
- Parks and Recreation season 4

"Bus Tour" is the twenty-first episode of the fourth season of the American comedy television series Parks and Recreation, and the 67th overall episode of the series. It originally aired on NBC in the United States on May 3, 2012.

In the episode, Leslie's (Amy Poehler) campaign drives around Pawnee to stir up support as the election nears, but it goes awry when Nick Newport Sr., the father of her opponent, Bobby Newport (Paul Rudd), dies.

== Plot ==
Thanks to her strong performance in the debate, Leslie is only two points behind Bobby Newport in the city council race. Leslie and her staff board a campaign bus to go around Pawnee and campaign hard in the final stretch, with a depressed Chris asking to do much of the busy work to distract himself. Vans rented to chauffeur elderly Leslie voters to the polls are suddenly no longer available, so Tom, Ron, and Donna head to the rental company to investigate. Andy, acting as Leslie's bodyguard in his Burt Macklin persona, is on high alert for the bus tour after someone tried to throw a pie at Leslie at a previous rally.

The bus tour goes smoothly, but when Leslie answers a reporter's question about Nick Newport Sr. – Bobby's father – by accusing him of buying the election and making other disparaging comments, the reporter reveals that Nick has died. Bobby's campaign manager Jennifer Barkley jumps on the opportunity and portrays Leslie as someone who only cares about politics, not the memory of Pawnee's leading benefactor. Meanwhile, Tom, Ron, and Donna discover that Nick had paid off the rental company manager, Bill, to not rent the vans to Leslie's campaign. After their attempts to sway Bill fail, they decide to block his truck with Donna's beloved Mercedes. When Bill rams his truck into it, she backs into him, with Tom and Ron threatening to tell police it was all Bill's fault unless he gives them the vans.

Ben decides Leslie should personally express her condolences to Bobby to salvage some positive press, but when the bus pulls up to the Newport estate, it interrupts a memorial service for Nick, further hurting Leslie's image. Leslie manages to speak with Bobby in private, who reveals he only ran for office to get his father's approval, which Leslie relates to by telling a story about trying to win her mother's approval. Bobby is grateful for Leslie's sympathy and gives a speech to reporters (stealing Leslie's story), but tells them about Leslie's kindness and asks voters who are against him to vote for her. A frustrated Jennifer – already worried that she won't get paid with Nick dying – believes Bobby's endorsement of Leslie will win her the election. April tells Chris that he shouldn't be lonely because they are his friends, but it does not work; Jennifer then finds Chris and convinces him to have sex with her.

Andy eventually solves the pie case: it was meant for Ben, not Leslie, and it was thrown by Joe, whom Ben had fired. Andy catches Joe attempting another pie throw, but he forgets to actually stop him and Ben is hit in the face.

== Reception ==
Steve Heisler of The A.V. Club gave the episode a B+. Matt Fowler of IGN gave the episode an 8/10 "Great" rating, ultimately saying the episode "had some great moments, but it ultimately felt like a placeholder."
