= Operation Ann =

- Parks and Recreation episode
- Episode no.: Season 4 Episode 14
- Directed by: Morgan Sackett
- Written by: Aisha Muharrar
- Original air date: February 2, 2012

Guest appearances
- *Martin Starr as Snow Globe Museum Attendant; *Harris Wittels as Harris

Episode chronology
← Previous "Bowling for Votes"	Next → "Dave Returns"
- Parks and Recreation season 4

"Operation Ann" is the fourteenth episode of the fourth season of the American comedy television series Parks and Recreation, and the 60th overall episode of the series. It originally aired on NBC in the United States on February 2, 2012.

In the episode, Leslie (Amy Poehler) is determined to find Ann (Rashida Jones) a date for Valentine's Day, Ben (Adam Scott) struggles with a scavenger hunt, and Chris (Rob Lowe) is depressed about his love life.

== Plot ==
Leslie hosts her annual "Galentine's Day" party for her female friends but feels bad that Ann doesn't have anyone with whom to celebrate Valentine's Day. She asks the parks department to set Ann up with someone at a Valentine's Day singles mixer that they are organizing. Chris, who is still depressed about being dumped by Millicent, decides to DJ the mixer. Meanwhile, Leslie has given Ben a Valentine's Day scavenger hunt filled with intricate riddles hidden all over Pawnee in order to discover where she wants to meet him that night, but she made it exceedingly difficult. Andy and Ron help Ben out, and Ron turns out to be very eager and adept at solving riddles, despite his claims to the contrary. They agree to split up and find the riddles out of order to more quickly find the last one.

At the mixer, Chris plays depressing music that puts a sour mood on the event. Ann arrives and Leslie unsuccessfully tries to set her up with numerous men. April, who dislikes Ann, brings her creepy friend Orin as a "date", leading Leslie to harshly criticize April for being an ass towards Ann, pointing out to April that Ann would have helped her in spite of how badly April treats her, and that April showed she was just being pathetically selfish. Tom steps up to help Ann out, making Ann feel better with his humorous efforts. Chris tells Leslie he is sad because he is 44 years old and still single, believing Millicent may have been his soulmate, but Leslie cheers him up with a pep talk, but says he is also at fault for being single since he dumped Ann. Chris later plays upbeat music and everyone has a good time at the mixer. A grateful Ann decides to go home, but Leslie catches her applying make-up in her car. Leslie thinks Ann is going to go out with Chris, leaving her angry because of the turmoil she went through regarding her relationship with Ben, and when April tries to get her to leave them alone Leslie ignores April because she thinks April is just trying to be mean to Ann again.

Ben, Ron, and Andy fail to find the last riddle, but Ron correctly guesses the meeting spot will be Li'l Sebastian's memorial site. Leslie tells Ben about Ann and Chris, and the two agree to catch them on a date to expose Chris' hypocrisy about workplace dating. To their shock, they find Ann on a date with Tom. April arrives and to Leslie's surprise explains that she helped set up Ann on a date with Tom, seeing how Tom made her laugh and that "this is a loser town full of loser people, and Tom's at least semi-cool." Leslie is touched that April helped Ann out. Leslie and Ben leave Ann and Tom alone on their date, which Ann quickly admits was a mistake after Tom reverts to his usual chauvinistic attitude. The next day, Ron sheepishly asks Leslie to organise a riddle scavenger hunt for his birthday.

== Reception ==
The episode was viewed by 3.60 million viewers, indicating a 3.15% increase from the previous episode, but still making it the third-lowest viewed episode of the series, after Bowling for Votes (3.49 million) and Road Trip (3.55 million).

Critical reaction to the episode was positive. Christopher Peck of Blast Magazine said that the episode's writers "challenged themselves...while not sacrificing the consistency and rhythm of its rise-and-fall joke," and that the "'operation' was successful." He awarded the episode an A−. In another positive review, Matt Fowler of IGN called the episode "the strongest episode in a long while," saying it "nailed every single comedic beat." He awarded the episode a 9.5, or "Amazing."
