= Prowers County Courthouse =

- Prowers County Building
- U.S. National Register of Historic Places
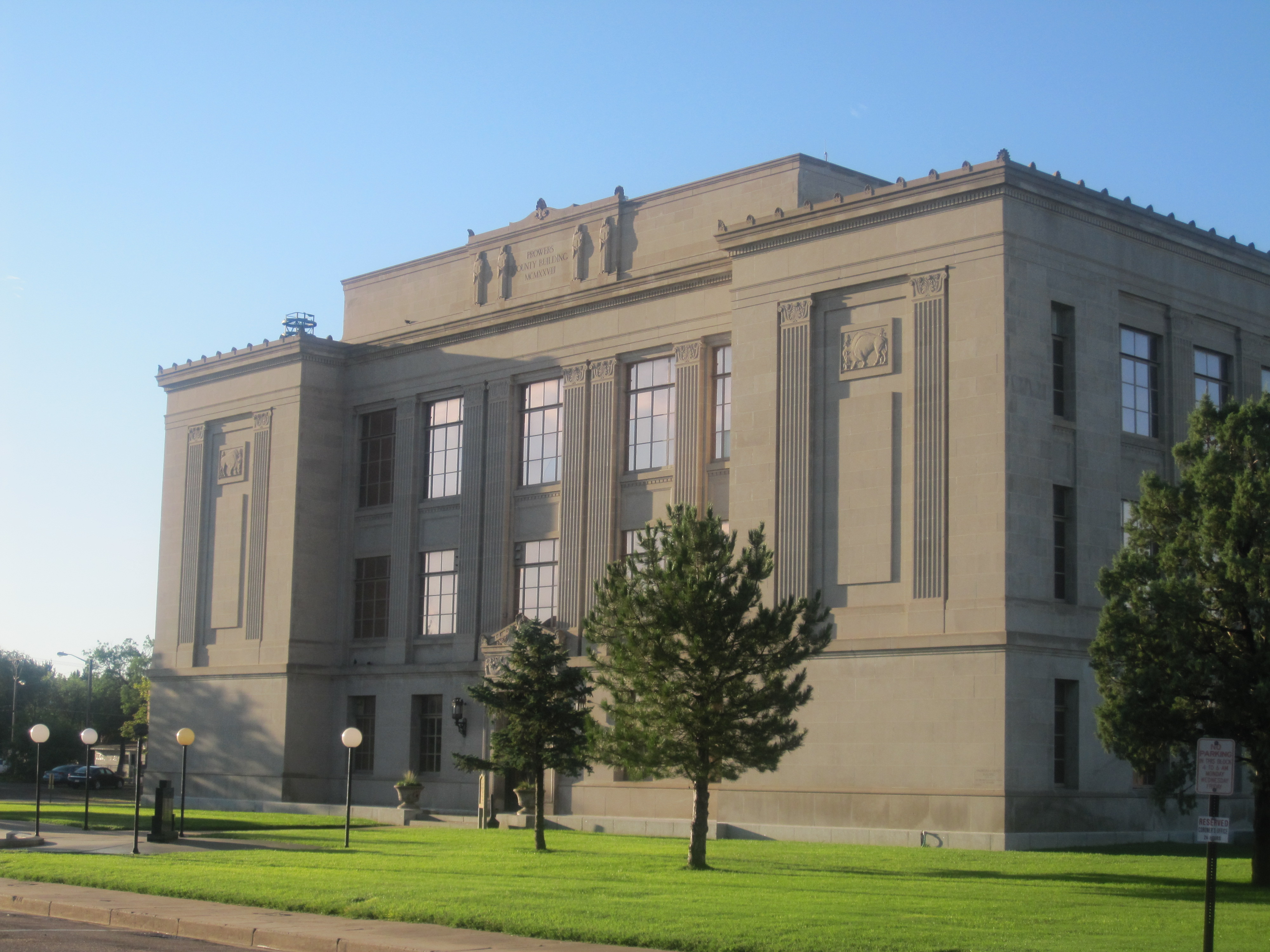

- Location within Colorado Location within the United States
- Interactive map showing the location of Prowers County Courthouse
- Location: 301 S. Main St., Lamar, Colorado
- Coordinates: 38°5′12″N 102°37′7″W
- Area: 0.6 acres (0.24 ha)
- Built: 1928
- Built by: Danielson, A.E.,& Sons
- Architect: Fuller, Robert K.
- Architectural style: Classical Revival
- NRHP reference No.: 81000186
- Added to NRHP: September 21, 1981

The Prowers County Building, at 301 S. Main St. in Lamar, Colorado, was built in 1928. It was a work of Robert K. Fuller and of A.E.Danielson & Sons in Classical Revival style. It served as a courthouse and has also been known as Prowers County Courthouse. It was listed on the National Register of Historic Places in 1981.

Its NRHP nomination asserted that: "In its innovative blending of academic and moderne forms, the Prowers County Building is clearly one of the most unique and distinguished county courthouses in the state."

An exterior shot of the building is used to represent the fictional Eagleton correctional facility in the Parks and Recreation episode Eagleton (Parks and Recreation).
