= Fun Size =

- Theatrical release poster
- Directed by: Josh Schwartz
- Written by: Max Werner
- Produced by: Stephanie Savage; Josh Schwartz; Bard Dorros; David Kanter
- Starring: Victoria Justice; Thomas Mann; Jane Levy; Chelsea Handler
- Cinematography: Yaron Orbach
- Edited by: Michael L. Sale; Wendy Greene Bricmont
- Music by: Deborah Lurie
- Production companies: Paramount Pictures; Nickelodeon Movies; Anonymous Content; Fake Empire
- Distributed by: Paramount Pictures (under Nickelodeon Movies)
- Release date: October 26, 2012
- Running time: 86 minutes
- Country: United States
- Language: English
- Budget: $14 million
- Box office: $11.4 million

Fun Size is a 2012 American teen comedy film directed by Josh Schwartz, written by Max Werner, and starring Victoria Justice, Thomas Mann, Jane Levy and Chelsea Handler.

The film tells the story of a teenage girl's Halloween plans gone awry when she's made to babysit her young brother, who disappears into a sea of trick-or-treaters and with her best friends and two nerds at her side, she needs to find her brother before her mom realizes he's missing.

Fun Size was released in theaters on October 26, 2012, by Paramount Pictures. The film received negative reviews from critics and was a box office bomb, grossing only $11.4 million worldwide against a $14 million budget.

== Plot ==
In Cleveland, Ohio, Joy, the widowed mother of high school senior Karen “Wren” DeSantis, is dating a 26-year-old named Keevin. Wren has her heart set on college life at New York University. Her friend April has her eyes set on social status, and Wren's nerdy friend Roosevelt has his heart set on Wren. The two girls are surprised when they find they are invited to a Halloween party by heartthrob Aaron Riley.

However, on the night Wren is supposed to go to the party, she is tasked by her mother to take her 8-year-old brother Albert trick-or-treating so she can go to a party with Keevin. The party that Keevin invites Joy to turns out to be run by his friend Nate Brueder.

At a haunted house later that night, Wren and April run into Roosevelt and his best friend Peng, at which point Albert wanders off on his own. They just miss him at a local convenience store, where he meets an employee named Fuzzy who seeks revenge against Jörgen, a mixed-martial arts fighter, who won the heart of his ex-girlfriend Lara. At Wren's urging, Roosevelt asks his parents, two semi-eccentric pacifistic lesbians, to borrow their Volvo. When they refuse, he takes the car anyway.

Roosevelt drives the group all over town to search for Albert. Wren suspects that he might be at a local Captain Chicken restaurant on Euclid Avenue, a fictional pirate-themed fast food chain. Again, the group just misses him, almost running him over while fleeing local bully Mike Puglio, who confronted them when the car stalled in front of his truck on a busy street. Albert is then rescued by Denise, a college girl dressed as "Galaxy Scout" (a fictional anime character). After Roosevelt accidentally destroys the restaurant's mechanical chicken statue and severely damages the car, and Peng angrily shoots Puglio's drumstick with his loaded 1800s-style pistol, April escapes.

After being harassed and robbed of his candy by Jörgen at a party with Denise, and remembering Fuzzy's description of him, Albert stows away in his convertible. Wren, Roosevelt, and Peng drive off looking for him, and now April, who later calls from Aaron Riley's party with the false impression that she has found Albert. Wren, Roosevelt, and Peng arrive at the party, and the earlier duel with Puglio gives Peng some social acceptance.

Wren receives a phone call from Jörgen, who is holding Albert hostage at his house. He threatens to turn him over to the police for pulling the stunt with Fuzzy, unless she gives him a ransom of $400 in cash, which she doesn't have.

After Jörgen gives her his address, Wren desperately runs through the streets of Cleveland trying to find his house. Arriving and telling him she doesn't have the money, he calls the police but puts them on hold when Wren finds out that he is a fan of the Beastie Boys. She offers to give him the collectible jacket she inherited from her late father, which was left behind by Mike D in his recording studio, as a substitute for cash.

Jörgen seems interested in her offer, but he says he is still reporting them to the police. Then Fuzzy breaks in to rescue the boy and his older sister by throwing fireworks throughout the house. Jörgen is injured in the explosion.

Wren and Albert visit the cemetery where their father is buried and place a plastic pumpkin with flowers on his grave. Albert thanks Wren for finding and rescuing him, just before their mother picks them up and drives them home.

Roosevelt shows up at the house, stating that he will get a part-time job at Captain Chicken to pay off the damages that he caused, and declaring his feelings for Wren. Joy then takes Albert inside, allowing Wren and Roosevelt to share a kiss. Meanwhile, April wakes up to find herself in the arms of Peng and, after looking around for witnesses decides to make out with him again.

Fuzzy meets Denise, who asks him out on a date. He also reveals that his real name is Manuel. Later, Albert reveals that he secretly has been pulling prank phone calls on both his mother, sister, and his sister's friend for six months, which includes the uploading of a video to Wren's Facebook page, making fun of Wren's bug dance and "explaining rap".

== Cast ==
- Victoria Justice as Karen "Wren" DeSantis
- Jane Levy as April Martin, Wren's best friend; A persistent social climber, she would rather drag Wren to a cool kids' party over finding her brother.
- Thomas Mann as Roosevelt Leroux, one of the nerds who helps Wren. He has a crush on Wren.
- Thomas Middleditch as Fuzzy, a clerk whom Albert befriends, and Lara's former boyfriend
- Jackson Nicoll as Albert "Spidey" DeSantis, Wren's oddball 8-year-old brother who goes around in his underwear.
- Osric Chau as Peng Chong, Roosevelt's best friend and fellow nerd who helps Wren; he has a crush on April.
- Chelsea Handler as Joy DeSantis, Wren and Albert's widowed mother.
- Thomas McDonell as Aaron Riley, the most popular guy in school.
- Riki Lindhome as Denise, a young college girl in a Galaxy Scout costume.
- Johnny Knoxville (uncredited) as Jörgen, a mixed-martial arts fighter who is a bully to Fuzzy and Albert.
- Josh Pence as Keevin (pronounced Keeven, like "Steven"), Joy's 26-year-old boyfriend.
- Ana Gasteyer as Jackie Leroux, Roosevelt's mom
- Kerri Kenney-Silver as Barb Leroux, Roosevelt's other mom
- Patrick de Ledebur as Mike Puglio, a school bully nicknamed the "Wedgie King."
- James Pumphrey as Nate Brueder, a friend of Keevin's who hosts a raging party in his parents' basement.
- Holmes Osborne as Mr. Brueder
- Annie Fitzpatrick as Mrs. Brueder
- Peter Navy Tuiasosopo as Mr. Mahani (Samoan man)
- Willam Belli as Qwerty
- Abby Elliott as Lara, Jörgen's girlfriend
- Cooper Ross as zombie doctor

== Production ==
In January 2011, it was announced that Josh Schwartz would direct the film as his feature film directorial debut. By the spring of 2011, the lead role had been offered to Victoria Justice, and Jane Levy had entered talks for her role in the film, with Paramount announcing initial plans for the project to be shot in Minnesota. The location was changed to Michigan and later to Cleveland, Ohio. When the production moved to Cleveland, a home was scouted and selected in Cleveland, Ohio. In June 2011, Chelsea Handler entered negotiations to co-star in the film. The film was released on October 26, 2012. Director Josh Schwartz discounted Internet claims that he was playing a convenience-store clerk. "No," he said shortly before the movie opened. "I get asked about it a lot, but that's an IMDb mistake. There are convenience-store clerks in the movie – just none played by me!"

== Release ==
A music video of Carly Rae Jepsen's "This Kiss" was shown prior to the film's release in theaters and Fun Size's star Thomas McDonell made a cameo in the music video. Fun Size opened at #10, earning $4.1 million over its first weekend at 3,014 theaters and averaging about $1,361 per venue. The film earned $11.4 million and is the lowest grossing wide released film from Nickelodeon Movies. Fun Size was released on DVD and Blu-ray on February 19, 2013, earning a profit of $888,095.

== Reception ==
Fun Size received negative reviews from critics, several of whom criticized the adult humor and sexual content despite the film's Nickelodeon pedigree. Rotten Tomatoes reports that of 25% of 73 surveyed critics gave the film a positive review; the average rating is 4.00/10. The consensus states: "It occasionally shows surprising flashes of wit, but Fun Size is too safe and formulaic -- not to mention unfunny -- to survive comparisons to the '80s teen movies it eagerly imitates." On Metacritic, the film has an aggregated score of 37/100 based on 25 reviews, indicating "generally unfavorable" reviews.

Corey Hall of the Detroit Metro Times gave this film a score of C and said that "Most of the dialogue sounds like it came from 35-year-old guys — and not from Carly Rae Jepsen fans. Only Levy, who anchors the ABC sitcom Suburgatory, has the comedic chops to pull this stuff off — albeit barely." Jen Chaney of The Washington Post gave this film a score of 1/4, calling it "a 90-minute theatrical release from Nickelodeon Productions that, if anything, should have aired as a half-hour Nickelodeon special." David Martindale of Dallas Morning News gave the film a C+, saying, "like a 'fun size' chocolate bar, it's just empty calories. It's a momentary pleasure, instantly forgotten." Mike McCahill of The Guardian described the film as a "smarmily opportunistic Adventures in Babysitting throwback". Claudia Puig of USA Today gave the film 1.5/4 stars and wrote: "There's little fun to be had in this foolish Halloween comedy that generates many more eye rolls than laughs." Alison Willmore of The A.V. Club gave the film a grade of D+, writing: "Justice is a pretty, personality-free screen presence, while the more interesting cast members, like Levy and Handler, are stuck in shrill, unsympathetic roles."

On the positive side, Sheri Linden of The Hollywood Reporter enjoyed the film and wrote, "Though it doesn't always hit the hilarity target, this tween-targeted romp strikes a sweet-but-not-sappy balance." Alonso Duralde of TheWrap wrote: "Screenwriter Max Werner and director Josh Schwartz clearly have several well-worn copies of Adventures in Babysitting between them, but they keep the gags coming at a brisk pace." Stephanie Zacharek of NPR wrote: "The fun to be had in Fun Size... is neither gigantic nor minuscule; it's just about fun size, which is probably enough." Miriam Bale of the New York Daily News gave the film 3/5 stars, writing: "By the end of this romp, "Fun Size" actually accomplished something charming: sentimentality without normality."

== See also ==
- List of films set around Halloween
