= Jackass Presents: Bad Grandpa =

2013 comedy film by Jeff Tremaine

- Theatrical release poster
- Directed by: Jeff Tremaine
- Screenplay by: Jeff Tremaine; Johnny Knoxville; Spike Jonze
- Story by: Fax Bahr; Spike Jonze; Johnny Knoxville; Adam Small; Jeff Tremaine
- Based on: Jackass by Johnny Knoxville; Spike Jonze; Jeff Tremaine
- Produced by: Johnny Knoxville; Jeff Tremaine; Derek Freda; Spike Jonze
- Starring: Johnny Knoxville; Spike Jonze; Jackson Nicoll; Georgina Cates; Blythe Barrington Hughes
- Cinematography: Dimitry Elyashkevich
- Edited by: Seth Casriel; Matt Kosinski; Matthew Probst
- Music by: Sam Spiegel; Koool G Murder
- Production companies: Dickhouse Productions; MTV Films
- Distributed by: Paramount Pictures
- Release date: October 25, 2013 (United States)
- Running time: 92 minutes
- Country: United States
- Language: English
- Budget: $15 million
- Box office: $152 million

Jackass Presents: Bad Grandpa (also known as simply Bad Grandpa) is a 2013 American hidden camera comedy film directed by Jeff Tremaine and written by Tremaine, Spike Jonze and Johnny Knoxville. It is the second film to use the title "Jackass Presents" of the Jackass franchise. The film stars Johnny Knoxville and Jackson Nicoll and it was produced by MTV Films and Dickhouse Productions and distributed by Paramount Pictures. The film was released on October 25, 2013. Bad Grandpa has a loose narrative that connects the stunts and pranks together (in a manner reminiscent of Borat), as opposed to the three original Jackass films which did not have a story.

The film became the first installment in the Jackass film series to be nominated for an Oscar, with head makeup artist Stephen Prouty being nominated for Best Makeup and Hairstyling at the 86th Academy Awards.

== Plot ==
86-year-old Irving Zisman's celebration over the death of his wife, Ellie, is cut short when he gets stuck with his eight-year-old grandson, Billy, because his mother, Kimmie (Irving's daughter), violated her parole and consequently is going back to jail. Kimmie urges Irving to make sure Billy makes it to his father. Irving and Billy get on a video call with Billy's deadbeat dad, Chuck, who instructs Irving to take Billy down to Raleigh, North Carolina by 2:00 PM on Sunday.

To make money, Irving sells his former wife's belongings, and later calls over two men to get her dead body into the trunk of his car. They settle her corpse in, and Irving and Billy hit the road. Billy is hungry, so Irving pulls over to a nearby market. He tries to flirt with a woman, as Billy goes on a ride that seems to not work. Irving tries going on the ride and it springs off its base.

Frustrated, Irving tries to ship Billy to North Carolina through the post office, but his attempt is not successful. Afterwards, he goes to play Bingo, leading to shenanigans between Irving and the other Bingo players, as Billy wanders off asking a random man to be his replacement dad.

Billy gets hungry again, so the two go to a supermarket. Irving shoplifts and makes Billy and himself a sandwich while they are in the store. Irving is confronted by staff for stealing, but he and Billy manage to leave.

Irving and Billy stop at a motel. Irving goes to a black men strip club so he could hook up with aroused women. He starts stripping as his testicles hang out of his underwear, disgusting the people in the club.

As they approach North Carolina, Irving uses Billy to attract women, but none fall for him. They drive to a diner, where Irving crashes into a large penguin statue. A man who promotes the diner is angered by this and demands him to fix the statue. They go in the diner and try to entertain each other by farting, but Irving accidentally defecates on the wall, so they leave.

Billy gets hungry once again, so Irving takes him to a church where a wedding reception is taking place. During a group photo, Irving swipes a glass of champagne from a wine glass tower, causing the entirety of the tower to collapse. He then falls on top of the table the tower was on and inadvertently destroys the wedding cake.

Irving drives Billy to a bar, where they are set to meet Billy's dad, Chuck, who is also speaking with a member of a biker organization entitled Guardians of the Children, which is an organization that assists abused children. They enter the bar, and Irving drops Billy off, bidding him farewell. Irving drives away, when he immediately starts to regret his decision, and returns to the bar. Chuck starts to show bad parenting toward Billy, which is noticed by the G.O.C. So, Irving successfully gets Billy as the members hold Chuck back.

To celebrate, Irving and Billy crash a beauty pageant after spotting the flyer on their road trip. Afterwards, Irving drives up to a bridge where he and Billy finally get rid of Ellie's body by throwing it into a river and proceed to go fishing.

== Cast ==
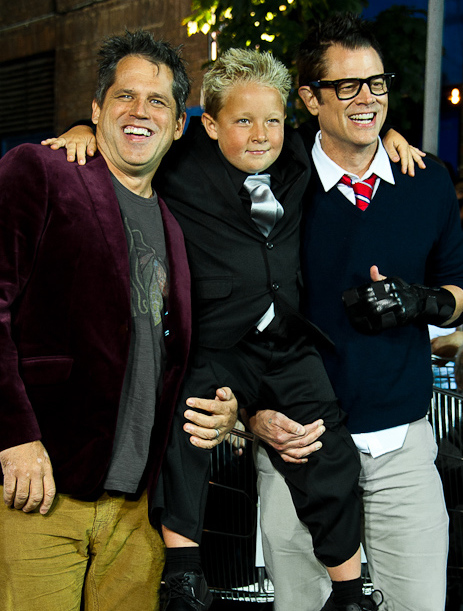
L–R: Jeff Tremaine, Jackson Nicoll and Johnny Knoxville at a screening for the film

- Johnny Knoxville as Irving Zisman
- Jackson Nicoll as Billy Zisman-Muskie
- Greg Harris as Chuck Muskie
- Georgina Cates as Kimmie Zisman
- Kamber Hejlik as Doctor
- Jill Kill as Pageant Reporter
- Madison Davis as Juggalo Girl
- George Faughnan as Juggalo Guy
- Grasie Mercedes as Hostess
- Marilynn Allain as Receptionist
- Jack Polick as Funeral Worker
- Spike Jonze as Gloria
- Catherine Keener as Ellie Zisman
- Blythe Barrington Hughes as herself

== Production ==
=== Development ===
In March 2012, Johnny Knoxville discussed the possibility of a fourth Jackass movie, saying "we're keeping our mind open" and "I've got 50–60 ideas on top of all the stuff we didn't get to shoot." According to Knoxville, him, Jonze and Tremaine went to pitch two movies to Paramount: a martial arts movie starring Willie Nelson and Broken Lizard, and Bad Grandpa – while their preference was strongly for the former, the studio instead picked the latter.

In June 2012, it was reported Paramount "registered several domains for a film that would be called Jackass 4: Bad Grandpa." During Bam Margera's September 18, 2012 interview on The Howard Stern Show about Jackass he said: "There's going to be a whole movie about Knoxville's grandpa character." The film was officially announced on July 17, 2013, and released on October 25, 2013. Knoxville revealed that he and director Jeff Tremaine had been approached about making a film featuring the Irving Zisman character, but held off as they did not feel a plot consisting of pranking the public would be able to carry an entire film. Eventually, Tremaine and Knoxville came up with a story to structure the pranks around. The film was dedicated to Jackass cast member Ryan Dunn, who died in 2011.

=== Filming ===
Much of Bad Grandpa was filmed in Cleveland and Columbus, Ohio, as well as North Carolina. The first scene shot featured Irving enraging golfers on a Columbus course, where he was working as a groundskeeper. "At that point all of my hesitancy just washed away," Knoxville said. "We got so much funny stuff that we knew we had something special." Alterian, Inc.'s prosthetic Irving Zisman makeup took three and a half hours to apply to Knoxville every morning. Five hours were needed for scenes requiring Knoxville to remove his shirt. Jackson Nicoll was cast as Billy, Irving Zisman's grandson. Knoxville cast Nicoll after working with him on the 2012 film Fun Size. "Jackson would just follow me on the set and verbally assault me while hitting me in the zipper," Knoxville said. "I was just shaking my head thinking that this kid is a piece of work. He's unbelievable. I think he was sent from heaven."

== Release ==
=== Critical response ===
Rotten Tomatoes gives the film an approval rating of 61% based on 109 reviews, with an average rating of 5.40/10. The site's critics consensus states: "Never quite as funny as it wants to be, Jackass Presents: Bad Grandpa still offers viewers the timeless pleasures of seeing an old man get his privates stuck in a vending machine." Metacritic, gave it a weighted average score of 54 out of 100 based on 29 critics, indicating "mixed or average" reviews. Audiences polled by CinemaScore gave the film an average grade of "B" on an A+ to F scale. The film was nominated for the Academy Award for Best Makeup and Hairstyling at the 86th Academy Awards, but lost to the biographical drama Dallas Buyers Club.

Ashley Clark of Time Out gave the film two out of five stars, saying "In Bad Grandpa, there's no shock value: the physical comedy is down to a minimum, replaced by a creaking humour almost as dated as Zisman himself." Scott Foundas of Variety gave the film a positive review, saying "Jackass Presents: Bad Grandpa shows there's still comic life in this decade-old franchise - provided, of course, the sight of a senior citizen getting his penis caught in a vending machine is the kind of thing that brings a smile to your face." Amy Nicholson of LA Weekly gave the film a C, saying "The joke is really on Knoxville, who, despite flinging himself through a glass wall and rigging up a fake poo-sprayer in his pants, gets fewer laughs than his boy sidekick." Elizabeth Weitzman of New York Daily News gave the film a negative review, saying "Knoxville and the perfectly cast Nicoll have great chemistry throughout. But longtime "Jackass" director Jeff Tremaine consistently cuts away too quickly, undermining each joke in order to rush on to the next." Michael O'Sullivan of The Washington Post gave the film two out of four stars, saying "Although we're allowed the perverse pleasure of watching Irving commit one inappropriate act after another, our sense of horror/delight dissipates after each one."

Peter Keough of The Boston Globe gave the film three out of four stars, saying "Though at times it grows predictable and more inane than outrageous, Bad Grandpa gets more than its share of cheap laughs." Colin Covert of the Star Tribune gave the film four out of four stars, saying "Bad Grandpa has the thrill of a dirty joke, brilliantly told. This film is emphatically not for everyone, but if it's not for you, too bad." Scott Bowles of USA Today gave the film three out of four stars, saying "Jackass Presents: Bad Grandpa not only stands as the best installment (by bounds) of Johnny Knoxville's hidden-camera franchise; it's one of the sharpest comedies of the year." Alonso Duralde of The Wrap gave the film a positive review, saying "When the three-act structure gets shoved to the side for fun and games, Bad Grandpa delivers some of the heartiest laughs I've had all year." Owen Gleiberman of Entertainment Weekly gave the film a B−, saying "You'll occasionally laugh out loud, but the heart of the movie is safe enough to chuckle at." R. Kurt Osenlund of Slant Magazine gave the film a half a star out of four, saying "A choppy, feature-length progression of crude, predictable gags, Bad Grandpa plays like a variety show, and yet its main attraction is barely funny enough to warrant his own brief sketch."

Sam Adams of Time Out New York gave the film two out of five stars, saying "Apart from a handful of physical stunts and the penultimate biker-bar setup, Knoxville never puts himself at risk, and the imbalance of power curdles the imperative to laugh at the rubes." Peter Travers of Rolling Stone gave the film two and a half stars out of four, saying "It's not really a movie. It's Johnny Knoxville and his Jackass crew faking out real people into believing he's 86-year-old Irving Zisman, an old fart bag traveling cross-country." Peter Hartlaub of the San Francisco Chronicle gave the film two out of four stars, saying "Some of the pranks are masterfully executed; the beauty pageant and a disastrous funeral near the beginning stand out. But on the whole, Bad Grandpa can't locate a consistent groove." Betsy Sharkey of the Los Angeles Times gave the film three and a half stars out of five, saying "The film has a story complete with a beginning, middle and end. It has some acting and emotion. And most shocking of all - it has empathy." Neil Genzlinger of The New York Times gave the film three and a half stars out of five, saying "It's hard to score big laughs with hidden-camera material these days because there has been so much of it since the "Jackass" TV show, but Mr. Knoxville and his young sidekick still land a few jaw-droppers."

Amy Nicholson of The Village Voice gave the film a negative review, saying "By Jackass standards, Bad Grandpa is benign—it's neither as fun nor as thrilling as watching Knoxville play tetherball with a beehive." Linda Barnard of the Toronto Star gave the film one and a half stars out of four, saying "Fans of the MTV series and related flicks will be quite entertained by this latest extrusion from the Jackass factory. But like the lime-green bingo dabber contents Irving drinks down to the horror of his seatmates, it's an acquired taste." Kyle Ryan of The A.V. Club gave the film a B−, saying "No one will ever mistake the Jackass franchise for good cinema, but it never aspired to that. It was always about allowing the gleeful anarchy of the TV series to escape the constraints of television — to be more outrageous, gross, and profane than the FCC would ever allow." Steve Rose of The Guardian gave the film three out of five stars, saying "Sacha Baron Cohen's Borat set the bar very high for this type of narrative-driven prankery, and in comparison, Bad Grandpa comes across as disjointed and aimless."

=== Box office ===
Jackass Presents: Bad Grandpa grossed $102,003,019 in North America, and $49,823,528 in other countries, for a worldwide total of $151,826,547. In North America, the film opened to #1 in its first weekend, with $32,055,177. In its second weekend, the film dropped to number two, grossing an additional $20,010,303. In its third weekend, the film stayed at number two, grossing $11,326,977. In its fourth weekend, the film dropped to number five, grossing $7,421,536.

=== Home media ===
Jackass Presents: Bad Grandpa was released on DVD and Blu-ray on January 28, 2014, in its theatrical version and an unrated version.

==== Bad Grandpa .5 ====
A version of the film with unused footage, titled Jackass Presents: Bad Grandpa .5, includes over 40 minutes of additional outtakes and interviews, and premiered June 15, 2014, on MTV. It was released on DVD and Blu-ray on July 8, 2014.
