= Jackson Nicoll =

American actor

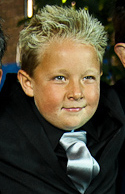
- Nicoll at a showing for Bad Grandpa in October 2013
- Born: December 1, 2003 (age 22); Seabrook, New Hampshire, U.S.
- Occupations: Actor; fisherman
- Years active: 2010–2017 (acting)

Jackson Nicoll (born December 1, 2003) is an American fisherman and former actor, best known for portraying Billy, the grandson of the title character, in Jackass Presents: Bad Grandpa (2013).

Nicoll is from Seabrook, New Hampshire. His other credits include The Fighter (2010), What's Your Number? (2011), and Fun Size (2012).

== Personal life ==
Since 2017, he has retired from acting and spends most of his time chronicling his fishing excursions. He is a full-time captain for Al Gauron Deep Sea Fishing and Whale Watching.

In 2025, Nicoll revealed on Instagram that he was engaged to his longtime girlfriend.

== Filmography ==
Film
Year	Title	Role	Notes
2010	Kidwalker	Jackson	Short film
2010	The Fighter	Little Dicky	
2011	Arthur	Library Boy #1	
2011	What's Your Number?	Justin	
2011	The Stand Up	Sebastian	
2012	Fun Size	Albert DeSantis	
2013	Jackass Presents: Bad Grandpa	Billy	Nominated—MTV Movie Award for Best WTF Moment (shared with Johnny Knoxville)
2014	Jackass Presents: Bad Grandpa .5	Billy	Direct-to-video
2014	Oneiromancy	Jackson	Short film
2015	Staten Island Summer	Wendell	
2017	The Book of Henry	Morris	

Television
Year	Title	Role	Notes
2014	Ridiculousness	Himself	Episode: "Jackson Nicoll"
2015	Another Period	The Little Asshole	Episode: "Funeral"
