= Michael Schur =

American television producer and writer (born 1975)

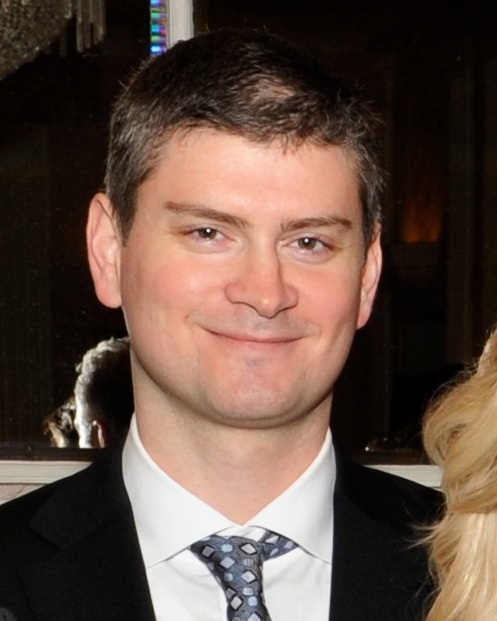
- Schur at the 2012 Peabody Awards
- Born: Michael Herbert Schur; October 29, 1975 (age 51); Ann Arbor, Michigan, U.S.
- Other name: Ken Tremendous
- Education: Harvard University (BA)
- Occupations: Television writer; producer; director; actor
- Years active: 1997–present
- Spouse: J. J. Philbin (m. 2005)
- Children: 2

Michael Herbert Schur (born October 29, 1975) is an American television writer, producer, director, and actor. He started his career as a writer for Saturday Night Live (1998–2004) before gaining acclaim as a writer and producer of the sitcom The Office (2005–2013), where he also played Mose Schrute. He expanded his career co-creating Parks and Recreation (2009–2015) with Greg Daniels and the sitcom Brooklyn Nine-Nine (2013–2021) with Dan Goor, and creating the sitcom The Good Place (2016–2020), the sitcom Rutherford Falls (2020–2022), and the comedy series A Man on the Inside (2024–present). He has served as a producer of the comedy drama series Master of None (2015–2021) and the comedy drama series Hacks (2021–2026).

Schur's comedies typically include large, diverse casts; breakout stars have emerged from his shows. He features optimistic characters who often find strong friendships and lasting love through plots that showcase "good-hearted humanistic warmth". As of October 2026, Schur has been nominated for 24 Primetime Emmy Awards, winning three for his work on Saturday Night Live, The Office, and Hacks. In May 2025, Schur received a star on the Hollywood Walk of Fame.

== Early life and education ==
Schur was born in 1975, at the University of Michigan Hospital in Ann Arbor, Michigan. His father, Warren Schur, was ethnically Jewish (though an atheist) and his mother, Anne Herbert, was Methodist. Schur was raised without religion. The family moved and he grew up in West Hartford, Connecticut.

Schur attended William H. Hall High School in West Hartford. He graduated Phi Beta Kappa with a B.A. in English from Harvard University in 1997, where he was president of the Harvard Lampoon. While at Harvard, Schur was classmates with Rashida Jones. The two later collaborated on The Office and Parks and Recreation.

== Career ==
=== 1998–2005 ===
Starting in 1998, Schur was a writer on NBC's Saturday Night Live. He later said he initially applied for the job in the fall of 1997, but Tina Fey got the job and he was hired that winter.

Schur became the producer of Weekend Update in 2001; his first show in the new role was Saturday Night Live's first episode after the September 11 attacks. In 2002, he won his first Primetime Emmy Award as part of SNL's writing team. Schur left Saturday Night Live in 2004.

Soon afterward, he became producer and writer for The Office on NBC, for which he wrote ten episodes and won the 2006 Emmy Award for Outstanding Comedy Series. Schur appeared on The Office as Dwight's cousin Mose in several episodes, including "Initiation", in which Dwight takes Ryan to his beet farm; "Money", in which Jim and Pam spend a night at the farm; "The Deposition"; "Koi Pond"; "Counseling"; and "Finale". He also co-wrote The Office: The Accountants webisodes with Paul Lieberstein. In 2005, Schur served as a co-producer of HBO's The Comeback and wrote two of its 13 episodes.

=== 2008–2015 ===
In April 2008, Schur and Greg Daniels started working on a pilot for Parks and Recreation as a proposed spin-off of The Office. Over time, Schur realized Parks and Recreation would work better if they made it separate from The Office. While Parks and Recreation received negative reviews in its first season, it received critical acclaim in the second, much like The Office. Schur also wrote for Fire Joe Morgan, a sports journalism blog, under the pseudonym "Ken Tremendous". He resurrected the pen name on March 31, 2011, when he began writing for SB Nation's Baseball Nation site. @KenTremendous is also Schur's Twitter handle.

Schur collaborated with The Decemberists on their music video for "Calamity Song" from the album The King Is Dead. This video is based upon Eschaton, a mock-nuclear war game played on tennis courts that David Foster Wallace created in his 1996 novel Infinite Jest. Schur wrote his undergraduate senior thesis on the novel and once held the film rights to it. With Daniel J. Goor, Schur created the cop comedy Brooklyn Nine-Nine, which premiered in fall 2013 on Fox. The show was moved to NBC in its sixth season. In 2013, Joe Posnanski and Schur created The PosCast. The podcast primarily discusses baseball but meanders into other sports, subjects, and drafts of random items, and prides itself in being meaningless. The podcast has featured notable guests and co-hosts such as Linda Holmes, Ken Rosenthal, Nick Offerman, Ellen Adair, Stefan Fatsis, Brandon McCarthy, Joey Votto, and Sean Doolittle.

=== 2016–present ===
On September 19, 2016, the Schur-created sitcom The Good Place began airing on NBC. The supernatural series concerning philosophy and being a good person, starring Kristen Bell and Ted Danson, became a surprise critical and commercial success, concluding its four-season run on January 30, 2020. In 2016, Schur and Rashida Jones co-wrote the teleplay of "Nosedive", an episode of the television anthology series Black Mirror, from a story by Charlie Brooker.

In 2019, Schur joined other Writers Guild of America writers in firing their agents as part of the WGA's stand against the ATA and the practice of packaging. In 2019, he began development of a scripted comedy, Rutherford Falls, starring Ed Helms. The series premiered on the streaming service Peacock on April 22, 2021. He worked on several projects for IMDb TV. In 2019, he re-upped his overall deal at Universal Television. In 2022, Schur released his first book, How to Be Perfect: The Correct Answer to Every Moral Question, which provides a humorous take on the ethical philosophy questions he studied while writing and producing The Good Place. In 2023, Schur appeared in Sorry/Not Sorry, a documentary about sexual misconduct allegations against Louis C.K. He developed a comedy series starring Ted Danson titled A Man on the Inside that debuted on Netflix in November 2024.

On May 22, 2025, Schur was honored with his own star on the Hollywood Walk of Fame.

== Personal life ==
Schur is married to J. J. Philbin, who was formerly a writer on The O.C. and is the daughter of Regis Philbin. Their son was born in 2008 and their daughter in 2010.

He is a vegetarian.

Schur is a sports fan whose favorite teams include the Boston Red Sox, New England Patriots, Boston Celtics, Michigan Wolverines football, UConn Huskies men's basketball, UConn Huskies women's basketball, and Liverpool F.C. His favorite baseball player is Mookie Betts.

== Influences ==
He first became interested in comedy at 11 years old when he read Woody Allen's 1975 collection of humorous essays Without Feathers. Schur said he found the book on his father's bookshelf and stayed up reading it until 4 a.m. He has also cited other influences as Monty Python, David Foster Wallace, and The Simpsons.

== Filmography ==
Television work by Michael Schur
Year	Title	Director	Writer	Producer	Notes
1998–2004	Saturday Night Live	No	Yes	Yes	Wrote 138 episodes; produced Weekend Update (2001–2004)
2005	The Comeback	No	Yes	Yes	Wrote 2 episodes
2005–2013	The Office	No	Yes	Yes	Wrote 12 episodes, appeared in 13 episodes
2006	Totally Awesome	No	Yes	No	Television film
2009–2015, 2020	Parks and Recreation	Yes	Yes	Executive	Co-creator, wrote 19 episodes, directed 9 episodes
2013–2021	Brooklyn Nine-Nine	Yes	Yes	Executive	Co-creator, wrote 2 episodes, directed 2 episodes
2016	Black Mirror	No	Yes	No	Episode: "Nosedive"; co-wrote with Rashida Jones
2016–2020	The Good Place	Yes	Yes	Executive	Creator, wrote 5 episodes, directed 4 episodes
2020	Single Parents	Yes	No	No	Episode: "Yarn and Pebbles"
2021–2022	Rutherford Falls	No	Yes	Executive	Co-creator
2024–present	A Man on the Inside	Yes	Yes	Executive	Creator; based on the documentary The Mole Agent
2026	Dig	Yes	Yes	Executive	Co-creator; based on the book Excavations

Executive producer only

- Master of None (2015–2021)
- Abby's (2019)
- Sunnyside (2019)
- Hacks (2021–2026)
- Q-Force (2021)
- Primo (2023)
- DANG! (2026)

Acting roles

Year	Title	Role	Notes
1998–2001	Saturday Night Live	Various roles	3 episodes
2006–2013	The Office	Mose Schrute	13 episodes
2007	The O.C.	Paul	Episode: "The Case of the Franks"
2008	Miss Guided	Male Teacher	Episode: "Pool Party"
2012	30 Rock	Ken Tremendous	Episode: "Stride of Pride"
2015	Parks and Recreation	Non-speaking cameo	Episode: "Second Chunce"

== Awards and nominations ==
Year	Award	Category	Nominated work	Result	Ref
2001	Primetime Emmy Awards	Outstanding Writing for a Variety Series	Saturday Night Live	Nominated	
2002	Primetime Emmy Awards	Outstanding Writing for a Variety Series	Saturday Night Live	Won	
2003	Primetime Emmy Awards	Outstanding Writing for a Variety Series	Saturday Night Live	Nominated	
2006	Primetime Emmy Awards	Outstanding Comedy Series	The Office	Won	
2006	Primetime Emmy Awards	Outstanding Writing for a Comedy Series	The Office - "Christmas Party"	Nominated	
2007	Primetime Emmy Awards	Outstanding Comedy Series	The Office	Nominated	
2007	Primetime Emmy Awards	Outstanding Writing for a Comedy Series	The Office - "The Negotiation"	Nominated	
2008	Primetime Emmy Awards	Outstanding Comedy Series	The Office	Nominated	
2011	Primetime Emmy Awards	Outstanding Comedy Series	Parks and Recreation	Nominated	
2012	Primetime Emmy Awards	Outstanding Writing for a Comedy Series	Parks and Recreation - "Win, Lose, or Draw"	Nominated	
2012	Primetime Emmy Awards	Outstanding Short Form Comedy, Drama or Variety Series	Parks And Recreation: April And Andy's Road Trip	Nominated	
2013	Writers Guild of America Awards	Comedy Series	Parks and Recreation	Nominated	
2013	Writers Guild of America Awards	Episodic Comedy	Parks and Recreation - "Leslie and Ben"	Nominated	
2014	Primetime Emmy Awards	Outstanding Short Form Comedy, Drama or Variety Series	Parks And Rec In Europe	Nominated	
2015	Primetime Emmy Awards	Outstanding Comedy Series	Parks and Recreation	Nominated	
2016	Primetime Emmy Awards	Outstanding Comedy Series	Master of None	Nominated	
2017	Primetime Emmy Awards	Outstanding Comedy Series	Master of None	Nominated	
2019	Primetime Emmy Awards	Outstanding Comedy Series	The Good Place	Nominated	
2020	Primetime Emmy Awards	Outstanding Comedy Series	The Good Place	Nominated	
2020	Primetime Emmy Awards	Outstanding Writing for a Comedy Series	The Good Place - "Whenever You're Ready"	Nominated	
2020	Primetime Emmy Awards	Outstanding Short Form Comedy Or Drama Series	The Good Place Presents: The Selection	Nominated	
2021	Primetime Emmy Awards	Outstanding Comedy Series	Hacks	Nominated	
2022	Writers Guild of America Awards	Comedy Series	Hacks	Won	
2022	Writers Guild of America Awards	New Series	Hacks	Won	
2022	Primetime Emmy Awards	Outstanding Comedy Series	Hacks	Nominated	
2024	Primetime Emmy Awards	Outstanding Comedy Series	Hacks	Won	
2025	Primetime Emmy Awards	Outstanding Comedy Series	Hacks	Nominated	
2026	Primetime Emmy Awards	Outstanding Comedy Series	Hacks	Nominated	

== Bibliography ==
- Schur, Michael (2022). How to Be Perfect: The Correct Answer to Every Moral Question. Simon & Schuster. ISBN 9781982159313.
