= List of Parks and Recreation episodes =

American sitcom television episodes

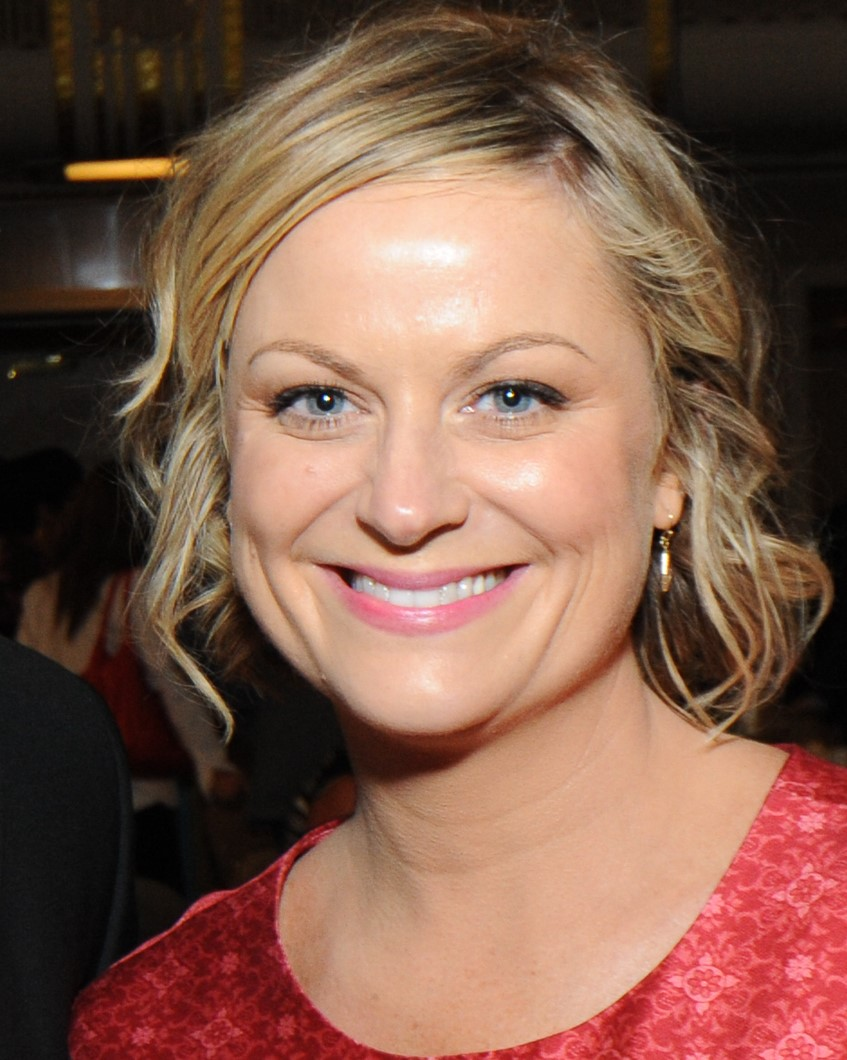
Series lead Amy Poehler

Parks and Recreation is an American television sitcom which ran for seven seasons on NBC. It was created by Greg Daniels and Michael Schur. The series follows Leslie Knope (Amy Poehler), a mid-level bureaucrat in the Parks Department of the fictional town of Pawnee, Indiana.

Alongside Poehler, Parks and Recreation stars Aziz Ansari, Rashida Jones, Nick Offerman, Aubrey Plaza, and Paul Schneider. In the second season, Chris Pratt joined the cast after having a recurring role in season one. Schneider departed following the conclusion of the second season. Adam Scott and Rob Lowe made guest appearances in the final two episodes of season two before joining the main cast in the premiere of season three. Jones and Lowe departed the series in the thirteenth episode of the sixth season. In the following episode, Jim O'Heir and Retta, who had previously recurred, were promoted to series regulars.

During the course of the series, 126 episodes of Parks and Recreation aired over seven seasons. The first season of the show aired from April 9, 2009, through May 14. Following season one, the series was renewed for a second season on October 23. The second season aired from September 17 through May 20, 2010. On January 30, 2010, due to Poehler's pregnancy, the series was renewed earlier than expected to allow production to continue uninterrupted. The third season aired from January 20, 2011, and concluded on May 19. The fourth season ran from September 22, 2011, to May 10, 2012. On May 11, following reports of a possible cancellation, NBC announced the series was renewed for a fifth season, which ran from September 20 through May 2, 2013. The sixth season was ordered on May 9. It ran from September 26 to April 14, 2014. On March 20, the series was renewed for a seventh season, which was later announced to be its last. Season seven aired from January 13, 2015, to February 24. A reunion special aired on April 30, 2020.

== Series overview ==
Seasons of Parks and Recreation
Season	Episodes	Originally released		Viewers (millions)
Season	Episodes	First released	Last released	Viewers (millions)
1	6	April 9, 2009	May 14, 2009	5.97
2	24	September 17, 2009	May 20, 2010	4.60
3	16	January 20, 2011	May 19, 2011	5.10
4	22	September 22, 2011	May 10, 2012	4.40
5	22	September 20, 2012	May 2, 2013	4.06
6	22	September 26, 2013	April 24, 2014	3.76
7	13	January 13, 2015	February 24, 2015	4.60
Special		April 30, 2020		3.64

== Episodes ==
The average episode runtime is 21–22 minutes without commercials. ^{†} denotes a longer 25–28 minute episode, while ^{‡} denotes a "double-length" 42-minute episode.

=== Season 1 (2009) ===
Parks and Recreation, season 1 episodes
No. overall	No. in season	Title	Directed by	Written by	Original release date	U.S. viewers (millions)
1	1	"Pilot"	Greg Daniels	Greg Daniels & Michael Schur	April 9, 2009	6.88
2	2	"Canvassing"	Seth Gordon	Rachel Axler	April 16, 2009	6.02
3	3	"The Reporter"	Jeffrey Blitz	Dan Goor	April 23, 2009	5.26
4	4	"Boys' Club"	Michael McCullers	Alan Yang	April 30, 2009	5.07
5	5	"The Banquet"	Beth McCarthy-Miller	Tucker Cawley	May 7, 2009	4.73
6	6	"Rock Show"^{†}	Michael Schur	Norm Hiscock	May 14, 2009	4.29

=== Season 2 (2009–10) ===
Parks and Recreation, season 2 episodes
No. overall	No. in season	Title	Directed by	Written by	Original release date	U.S. viewers (millions)
7	1	"Pawnee Zoo"	Paul Feig	Norm Hiscock	September 17, 2009	4.89
8	2	"The Stakeout"	Seth Gordon	Rachel Axler	September 24, 2009	4.09
9	3	"Beauty Pageant"	Jason Woliner	Katie Dippold	October 1, 2009	4.67
10	4	"Practice Date"	Alex Hardcastle	Harris Wittels	October 8, 2009	4.75
11	5	"Sister City"	Michael Schur	Alan Yang	October 15, 2009	4.53
12	6	"Kaboom"	Charles McDougall	Aisha Muharrar	October 22, 2009	4.92
13	7	"Greg Pikitis"	Dean Holland	Michael Schur	October 29, 2009	4.80
14	8	"Ron and Tammy"	Troy Miller	Mike Scully	November 5, 2009	4.91
15	9	"The Camel"	Millicent Shelton	Rachel Axler	November 12, 2009	4.58
16	10	"Hunting Trip"	Greg Daniels	Dan Goor	November 19, 2009	4.55
17	11	"Tom's Divorce"	Troy Miller	Harris Wittels	December 3, 2009	4.80
18	12	"Christmas Scandal"	Randall Einhorn	Michael Schur	December 10, 2009	4.90
19	13	"The Set Up"^{†}	Troy Miller	Katie Dippold	January 14, 2010	4.63
20	14	"Leslie's House"	Alex Hardcastle	Dan Goor	January 21, 2010	4.36
21	15	"Sweetums"	Dean Holland	Alan Yang	February 4, 2010	4.88
22	16	"Galentine's Day"	Ken Kwapis	Michael Schur	February 11, 2010	4.98
23	17	"Woman of the Year"	Jason Woliner	Norm Hiscock	March 4, 2010	4.61
24	18	"The Possum"	Tristram Shapeero	Mike Scully	March 11, 2010	4.55
25	19	"Park Safety"	Michael Trim	Aisha Muharrar	March 18, 2010	4.63
26	20	"Summer Catalog"	Ken Whittingham	Katie Dippold	March 25, 2010	4.47
27	21	"94 Meetings"	Tristram Shapeero	Harris Wittels	April 29, 2010	4.03
28	22	"Telethon"	Troy Miller	Amy Poehler	May 6, 2010	4.03
29	23	"The Master Plan"^{†}	Dean Holland	Michael Schur	May 13, 2010	4.28
30	24	"Freddy Spaghetti"^{†}	Jason Woliner	Dan Goor	May 20, 2010	4.58

=== Season 3 (2011) ===
Parks and Recreation, season 3 episodes
No. overall	No. in season	Title	Directed by	Written by	Original release date	U.S. viewers (millions)
31	1	"Go Big or Go Home"	Dean Holland	Alan Yang	January 20, 2011	6.14
32	2	"Flu Season"	Wendey Stanzler	Norm Hiscock	January 27, 2011	5.83
33	3	"Time Capsule"	Michael Schur	Michael Schur	February 3, 2011	4.95
34	4	"Ron & Tammy: Part Two"	Tucker Gates	Emily Kapnek	February 10, 2011	5.03
35	5	"Media Blitz"	David Rogers	Harris Wittels	February 17, 2011	4.33
36	6	"Indianapolis"	Randall Einhorn	Katie Dippold	February 24, 2011	4.59
37	7	"Harvest Festival"^{†}	Dean Holland	Dan Goor	March 17, 2011	4.08
38	8	"Camping"	Rob Schrab	Aisha Muharrar	March 24, 2011	5.15
39	9	"Andy and April's Fancy Party"	Michael Trim	Katie Dippold	April 14, 2011	5.16
40	10	"Soulmates"	Ken Whittingham	Alan Yang	April 21, 2011	4.88
41	11	"Jerry's Painting"^{†}	Dean Holland	Norm Hiscock	April 28, 2011	4.71
42	12	"Eagleton"	Nicole Holofcener	Emily Spivey	May 5, 2011	5.06
43	13	"The Fight"^{†}	Randall Einhorn	Amy Poehler	May 12, 2011	4.55
44	14	"Road Trip"	Troy Miller	Harris Wittels	May 12, 2011	3.54
45	15	"The Bubble"	Matt Sohn	Greg Levine & Brian Rowe	May 19, 2011	4.27
46	16	"Li'l Sebastian"^{†}	Dean Holland	Dan Goor	May 19, 2011	3.72

=== Season 4 (2011–12) ===
Parks and Recreation, season 4 episodes
No. overall	No. in season	Title	Directed by	Written by	Original release date	U.S. viewers (millions)
47	1	"I'm Leslie Knope"	Troy Miller	Dan Goor	September 22, 2011	4.11
48	2	"Ron and Tammys"	Randall Einhorn	Norm Hiscock	September 29, 2011	4.33
49	3	"Born & Raised"	Dean Holland	Aisha Muharrar	October 6, 2011	4.15
50	4	"Pawnee Rangers"	Charles McDougall	Alan Yang	October 13, 2011	3.99
51	5	"Meet n Greet"	Wendey Stanzler	Katie Dippold	October 27, 2011	3.90
52	6	"End of the World"^{†}	Dean Holland	Michael Schur	November 3, 2011	4.00
53	7	"The Treaty"	Jorma Taccone	Harris Wittels	November 10, 2011	3.66
54	8	"Smallest Park"	Nicole Holofcener	Chelsea Peretti	November 17, 2011	3.68
55	9	"The Trial of Leslie Knope"	Dean Holland	Dan Goor & Michael Schur	December 1, 2011	3.69
56	10	"Citizen Knope"	Randall Einhorn	Dave King	December 8, 2011	3.64
57	11	"The Comeback Kid"	Tucker Gates	Mike Scully	January 12, 2012	4.09
58	12	"Campaign Ad"	Dean Holland	Alan Yang	January 19, 2012	4.25
59	13	"Bowling for Votes"	Michael Trim	Katie Dippold	January 26, 2012	3.49
60	14	"Operation Ann"	Morgan Sackett	Aisha Muharrar	February 2, 2012	3.60
61	15	"Dave Returns"	Robert B. Weide	Harris Wittels	February 16, 2012	3.45
62	16	"Sweet Sixteen"	Michael Schur	Norm Hiscock	February 23, 2012	3.43
63	17	"Campaign Shake-Up"	Dan Goor	Dan Goor	March 1, 2012	3.77
64	18	"Lucky"	Troy Miller	Nick Offerman	March 8, 2012	3.66
65	19	"Live Ammo"	Tristram Shapeero	Dave King & Chelsea Peretti	April 19, 2012	3.46
66	20	"The Debate"^{†}	Amy Poehler	Amy Poehler	April 26, 2012^{[a]}	3.17
67	21	"Bus Tour"^{†}	Dean Holland	Aisha Muharrar & Alan Yang	May 3, 2012^{[a]}	3.26
68	22	"Win, Lose, or Draw"^{†}	Michael Schur	Michael Schur	May 10, 2012^{[a]}	3.42

^{a} Episodes 20–22 premiered on Citytv two days prior to airing on NBC. The NBC airdates and ratings are listed.

=== Season 5 (2012–13) ===
Parks and Recreation, season 5 episodes
No. overall	No. in season	Title	Directed by	Written by	Original release date	U.S. viewers (millions)
69	1	"Ms. Knope Goes to Washington"	Dean Holland	Aisha Muharrar	September 20, 2012	3.50
70	2	"Soda Tax"	Kyle Newacheck	Norm Hiscock	September 27, 2012	3.27
71	3	"How a Bill Becomes a Law"	Ken Whittingham	Dan Goor	October 4, 2012	3.53
72	4	"Sex Education"	Craig Zisk	Alan Yang	October 18, 2012	3.46
73	5	"Halloween Surprise"^{†}	Dean Holland	Michael Schur	October 25, 2012	3.34
74	6	"Ben's Parents"	Dean Holland	Greg Levine	November 8, 2012	3.46
75	7	"Leslie vs. April"	Wendey Stanzler	Harris Wittels	November 15, 2012	3.52
76	8	"Pawnee Commons"	Morgan Sackett	Alexandra Rushfield	November 29, 2012	2.99
77	9	"Ron and Diane"	Dan Goor	Megan Amram & Aisha Muharrar	December 6, 2012	3.27
78	10	"Two Parties"	Dean Holland	Dave King	January 17, 2013	3.92
79	11	"Women in Garbage"	Norm Hiscock	Harris Wittels	January 24, 2013	3.94
80	12	"Ann's Decision"	Ken Whittingham	Nate DiMeo	February 7, 2013	3.76
81	13	"Emergency Response"^{†}	Dean Holland	Norm Hiscock & Joe Mande	February 14, 2013	3.18
82	14	"Leslie and Ben"	Craig Zisk	Michael Schur & Alan Yang	February 21, 2013	3.07
83	15	"Correspondents' Lunch"	Nick Offerman	Alexandra Rushfield	February 21, 2013	2.95
84	16	"Bailout"	Craig Zisk	Joe Mande	March 14, 2013	3.00
85	17	"Partridge"	Tristram Shapeero	Dave King	April 4, 2013	2.93
86	18	"Animal Control"	Craig Zisk	Megan Amram	April 11, 2013	3.15
87	19	"Article Two"	Amy Poehler	Matt Murray	April 18, 2013	3.35
88	20	"Jerry's Retirement"	Nicole Holofcener	Norm Hiscock & Aisha Muharrar	April 18, 2013	3.34
89	21	"Swing Vote"	Alan Yang	Joe Mande & Alan Yang	April 25, 2013	2.59
90	22	"Are You Better Off?"	Dean Holland	Michael Schur	May 2, 2013	2.99

=== Season 6 (2013–14) ===
Parks and Recreation, season 6 episodes
No. overall	No. in season	Title	Directed by	Written by	Original release date	U.S. viewers (millions)
91	1	"London"^{‡}	Dean Holland	Michael Schur	September 26, 2013	3.27
92	2	"London"^{‡}	Dean Holland	Michael Schur	September 26, 2013	3.27
93	3	"The Pawnee-Eagleton Tip Off Classic"	Nicole Holofcener	Alan Yang	October 3, 2013	3.14
94	4	"Doppelgängers"	Jay Karas	Donick Cary	October 10, 2013	3.23
95	5	"Gin It Up!"	Jorma Taccone	Matt Murray	October 17, 2013	3.27
96	6	"Filibuster"	Morgan Sackett	Harris Wittels	November 14, 2013	3.03
97	7	"Recall Vote"	Wendey Stanzler	Aisha Muharrar	November 14, 2013	3.03
98	8	"Fluoride"	Michael Trim	Matt Hubbard	November 21, 2013	2.81
99	9	"The Cones of Dunshire"	Julie Anne Robinson	Dave King	November 21, 2013	2.81
100	10	"Second Chunce"^{†}	Dean Holland	Amy Poehler & Michael Schur	January 9, 2014	3.43
101	11	"New Beginnings"	Alan Yang	Sam Means	January 16, 2014	3.05
102	12	"Farmers Market"	Adam Scott	Joe Mande	January 23, 2014	2.98
103	13	"Ann and Chris"	Dean Holland	Aisha Muharrar & Michael Schur	January 30, 2014	3.03
104	14	"Anniversaries"	Morgan Sackett	Megan Amram	February 27, 2014	2.52
105	15	"The Wall"	Ken Whittingham	Jen Statsky	March 6, 2014	2.95
106	16	"New Slogan"	Dean Holland	Alan Yang & Sam Means	March 13, 2014	2.72
107	17	"Galentine's Day"	Beth McCarthy-Miller	Emma Fletcher & Rachna Fruchbom	March 20, 2014	3.05
108	18	"Prom"	Ken Whittingham	Matt Murray & Harris Wittels	April 3, 2014	2.67
109	19	"Flu Season 2"^{†}	Nick Offerman	Megan Amram & Dave King	April 10, 2014	2.56
110	20	"One in 8,000"	Dean Holland	Donick Cary & Joe Mande	April 17, 2014	2.39
111	21	"Moving Up"^{†‡}	Michael Schur	Aisha Muharrar & Alan Yang	April 24, 2014	2.71
112	22	"Moving Up"^{†‡}	Michael Schur	Aisha Muharrar & Alan Yang	April 24, 2014	2.71

=== Season 7 (2015) ===
Parks and Recreation, season 7 episodes
No. overall	No. in season	Title	Directed by	Written by	Original release date	U.S. viewers (millions)
113	1	"2017"	Dean Holland	Alan Yang & Matt Murray	January 13, 2015	3.75
114	2	"Ron and Jammy"^{†}	Dean Holland	Harris Wittels	January 13, 2015	3.25
115	3	"William Henry Harrison"	Tom Magill	Megan Amram	January 20, 2015	3.87
116	4	"Leslie and Ron"	Beth McCarthy-Miller	Michael Schur	January 20, 2015	3.30
117	5	"Gryzzlbox"	Amy Poehler	Donick Cary	January 27, 2015	3.48
118	6	"Save JJ's"	Ken Whittingham	Joe Mande	January 27, 2015	2.97
119	7	"Donna and Joe"	Ken Whittingham	Aisha Muharrar	February 3, 2015	3.45
120	8	"Ms. Ludgate-Dwyer Goes to Washington"	Morgan Sackett	Dave King	February 10, 2015	3.06
121	9	"Pie-Mary"^{†}	Greg Daniels	Emma Fletcher & Rachna Fruchbom	February 10, 2015	2.47
122	10	"The Johnny Karate Super Awesome Musical Explosion Show"	Dean Holland	Matt Hubbard	February 17, 2015	2.94
123	11	"Two Funerals"	Craig Zisk	Jen Statsky	February 17, 2015	2.47
124	12	"One Last Ride"^{†‡}	Michael Schur	Michael Schur & Amy Poehler	February 24, 2015	4.15
125	13	"One Last Ride"^{†‡}	Michael Schur	Michael Schur & Amy Poehler	February 24, 2015	4.15

=== Special episode (2020) ===
In April 2020, amidst the COVID-19 pandemic, NBC announced they would air a new, special episode of the series, centered on Leslie trying to stay connected with the other residents of Pawnee during social distancing. The series's cast returned for the special, which benefited Feeding America's COVID-19 response.

Parks and Recreation specials
No. overall	Title	Directed by	Written by	Original release date	U.S. viewers (millions)
126	"A Parks and Recreation Special"	Morgan Sackett	Michael Schur, Megan Amram, Dave King, Joe Mande, Aisha Muharrar, Matt Murray and Jen Statsky	April 30, 2020	3.64
The episode is set in 2020. Leslie Knope, who currently works in Washington, D.C., in the Department of the Interior, tries to stay in communication with the rest of the citizens of Pawnee while social distancing during the 2020 COVID-19 pandemic.

== Ratings ==
=== Season 1–4 ===
Parks and Recreation : U.S. viewers per episode (millions)

Season	Episode number																							
Season	1	2	3	4	5	6	7	8	9	10	11	12	13	14	15	16	17	18	19	20	21	22	23	24
1	6.88	6.02	5.26	5.07	4.73	4.29	–																	
2	4.89	4.09	4.67	4.75	4.53	4.92	4.80	4.91	4.58	4.55	4.80	4.90	4.63	4.36	4.88	4.98	4.61	4.55	4.63	4.47	4.03	4.03	4.28	4.58
3	6.14	5.83	4.95	5.03	4.33	4.59	4.08	5.15	5.16	4.88	4.71	5.06	4.55	3.54	4.27	3.72	–							
4	4.11	4.33	4.15	3.99	3.90	4.00	3.66	3.68	3.69	3.64	4.09	4.25	3.49	3.60	3.45	3.43	3.77	3.66	3.46	3.17	3.26	3.42	–	

Audience measurement performed by Nielsen Media Research (Note: For the first season, see: Episode one: Episode two: Episode three: Episode four: Episode five: Episode six:) (Note: For the second season see: Episode one: Episode two: Episode three: Episode four: Episode five: Episode six: Episode seven: Episode eight: Episode nine: Episode ten: Episode eleven: Episode twelve: Episode thirteen: Episode fourteen: Episode fifteen: Episode sixteen: Episode seventeen: Episode eighteen: Episode nineteen: Episode twenty: Episode twenty-one: Episode twenty-two: Episode twenty-three; Episode twenty-four:) (Note: For the third season, see: Episode one: Episode two: Episode three: Episode four: Episode five: Episode six: Episode seven: Episode eight: Episode nine: Episode ten: Episode eleven: Episode twelve: Episodes thirteen and fourteen: Episodes fifteen and sixteen:) (Note: For the fourth season, see)

=== Season 5–Special ===
Parks and Recreation : U.S. viewers per episode (millions)

Season	Episode number																					
Season	1	2	3	4	5	6	7	8	9	10	11	12	13	14	15	16	17	18	19	20	21	22
5	3.50	3.27	3.53	3.46	3.34	3.46	3.52	2.99	3.27	3.92	3.94	3.76	3.18	3.07	2.95	3.00	2.93	3.15	3.35	3.34	2.59	2.99
6	3.27	3.27	3.14	3.23	3.27	3.03	3.03	2.81	2.81	3.43	3.05	2.98	3.03	2.52	2.95	2.72	3.05	2.67	2.56	2.39	2.71	2.71
7	3.75	3.25	3.87	3.30	3.48	2.97	3.45	3.06	2.47	2.94	2.47	4.15	4.15	–								
Special	3.64	–																				

Audience measurement performed by Nielsen Media Research (Note: For the fifth season, see) (Note: For the sixth season, see) (Note: For the seventh season, see) (Note: For the special, see)
