= List of awards and nominations received by Parks and Recreation =

Awards and nominations received by Parks and Recreation
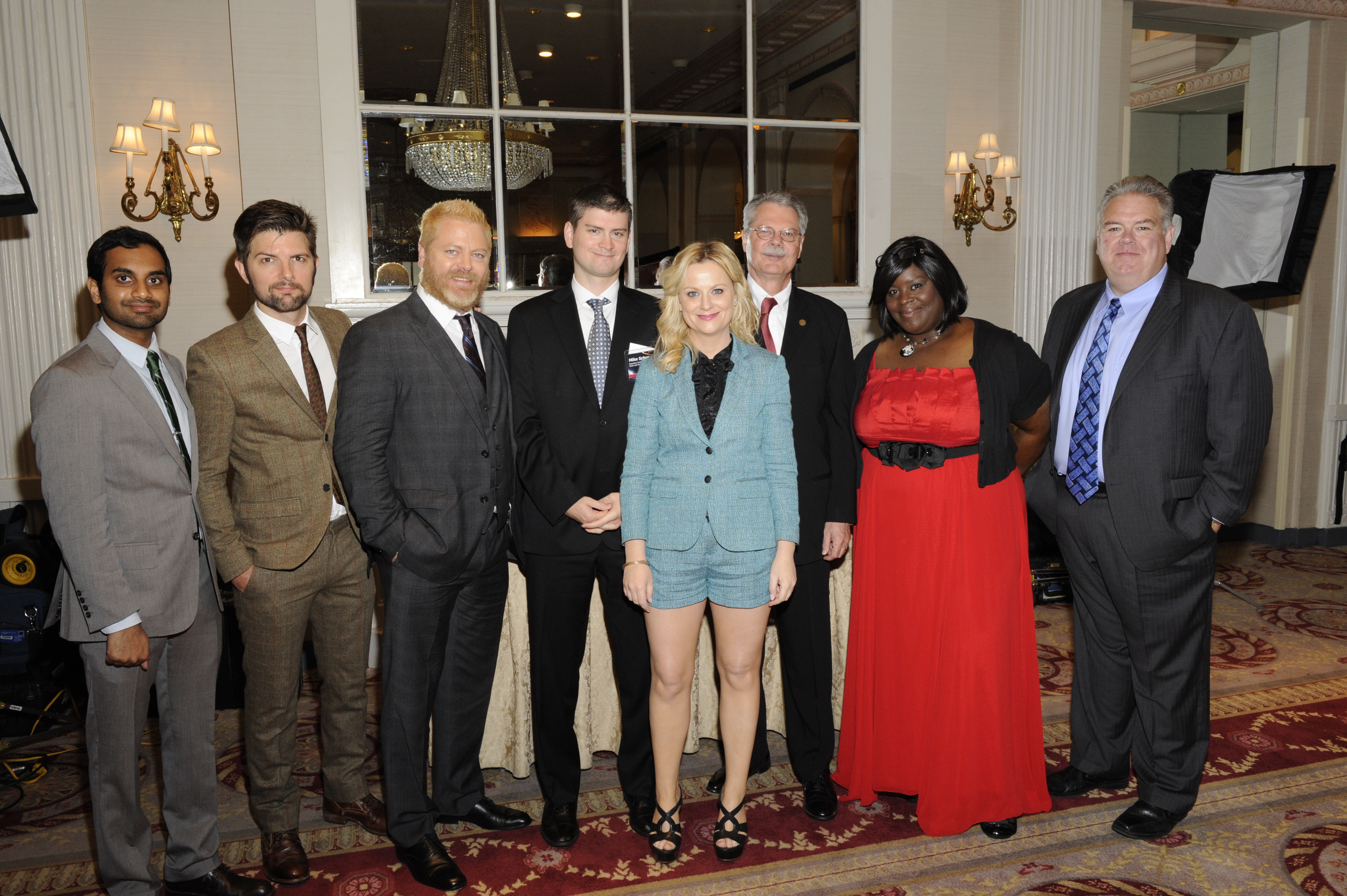
- The cast of Parks and Recreation at the 71st Annual Peabody Awards in 2012
Awards and nominations
Award	Wins	Nominations
ADG Awards	0	2
AFI Awards	1	1
ALMA Awards	0	2
American Comedy Awards	2	4
Cinema Audio Society Awards	0	3
Critics' Choice Television Awards	3	15
Emmy Awards	0	16
GLAAD Media Awards	1	1
Golden Globe Awards	1	4
Golden Reel Awards	0	1
Gracie Awards	2	2
Imagen Awards	0	4
NAACP Image Awards	2	6
Peabody Awards	1	1
Producers Guild of America Awards	0	1
Satellite Awards	0	5
Screen Actors Guild Awards	0	3
Writers Guild of America Awards	0	5

Totals (Note: Certain award groups do not simply award one winner. They acknowledge several different recipients, have runners-up, and have third place. Since this is a specific recognition and is different from losing an award, runner-up mentions are considered wins in this award tally. For simplification and to avoid errors, each award in this list has been presumed to have had a prior nomination.)
- Wins: 13
- Nominations: 76

Parks and Recreation is an American situation comedy created by Greg Daniels and Michael Schur. The show premiered on NBC on April 9, 2009, and concluded on February 24, 2015, after airing seven seasons. The series stars Amy Poehler as Leslie Knope, an ambitious, mid-level bureaucrat working in the Parks and Recreation Department of Pawnee, a fictional town in Indiana. The sitcom features an ensemble cast, including Rashida Jones, Aziz Ansari, Nick Offerman, Aubrey Plaza, Chris Pratt, Adam Scott, Rob Lowe, Paul Schneider, Jim O'Heir and Retta, among others.

The show was nominated for a variety of different awards throughout its run, including sixteen Primetime Emmy Award nominations, twice as a comedy series and twice for writing. Parks and Recreation was also nominated for fifteen Critics' Choice Television Awards (three wins), two Art Directors Guild Awards, four Golden Globe Awards (one win), a Peabody Award (one win), a Producers Guild of America Award, five Satellite Awards, and five Writers Guild of America Awards, among other awards.

Poehler received the most recognition with 25 nominations for acting, winning an American Comedy Award, a Critics' Choice Television Award, a Golden Globe Award, a Gracie Award, as well as receiving six consecutive nominations for the Primetime Emmy Award for Outstanding Lead Actress in a Comedy Series, without any wins. Plaza has seven nominations, while Scott, Ansari, Offerman, and Jones each received two nominations for acting. Throughout its run, Parks and Recreation won 13 awards from a total of 76 nominations.

== Awards and nominations ==
=== ADG Awards ===
The ADG Excellence in Production Design Award is presented each year by the American Art Directors Guild to recognize the best production design and art direction in the film and television industries. Parks and Recreation was nominated twice.

Year	Category	Nominee(s)	Result	Ref.
2013	Episode of a Half Hour Single-Camera Television Series	Ian Phillips (for the episode "Soda Tax")	Nominated	
2014	Episode of a Half Hour Single-Camera Television Series	Ian Phillips (for the episode "London")	Nominated	

=== AFI Awards ===
The AFI Award, created in 2000 by the American Film Institute, is given annually to ten films and ten television programs to acknowledge the "most significant achievements in the art of the moving image". Parks and Recreation was honored in 2011.

Year	Category	Nominee(s)	Result (Note: Awards in the categories do not have prior nominations and only winners are announced. For simplification and to avoid errors, each award in the list was presumed to have had a prior nomination.)	Ref.
2011	AFI Television Programs of the Year	Parks and Recreation	Won	

=== ALMA Awards ===
The American Latino Media Arts Award, or simply ALMA Award, is an accolade presented annually to acknowledge the best American Latino contributions to film, music, and television. Plaza received two nominations.

Year	Category	Nominee(s)	Result	Ref.
2011	Favorite TV Actress – Supporting Role	Aubrey Plaza	Nominated	
2012	Favorite TV Actress – Comedy	Aubrey Plaza	Nominated	

=== American Comedy Awards ===
The American Comedy Awards recognize the best work in comedy. The accolade is given to television programs, films or individuals. Parks and Recreation has two wins from four nominations.

Year	Category	Nominee(s)	Result	Ref.
2014	Best Comedy Series	Parks and Recreation	Won	
2014	Best Comedy Actress – TV	Amy Poehler	Won	
2014	Best Comedy Supporting Actress – TV	Aubrey Plaza	Nominated	
2014	Best Comedy Supporting Actor – TV	Aziz Ansari	Nominated	

=== Cinema Audio Society Awards ===
The Cinema Audio Society Awards honor the outstanding achievements in audio mixing. Parks and Recreation has three consecutive nominations.

Year	Category	Nominee(s)	Result	Ref.
2014	Outstanding Achievement in Sound Mixing for Television Series – Half Hour	Steve Morantz, John W. Cook II, and Kenneth Kobett (for the episode "Leslie and Ben")	Nominated	
2015	Outstanding Achievement in Sound Mixing for Television Series – Half Hour	Steve Morantz, John W. Cook II, and Robert Carr (for the episode "Moving Up")	Nominated	
2016	Outstanding Achievement in Sound Mixing for Television Series – Half Hour	George Flores, John W. Cook II, and Bill Freesh (for the episode "One Last Ride")	Nominated	

=== Critics' Choice Television Awards ===
The Critics' Choice Television Award is an annual accolade given by the Broadcast Film Critics Association since 2011 in order to recognize the most significant achievements in television. Parks and Recreation has three wins out of fifteen nominations.

Year	Category	Nominee(s)	Result	Ref.
2011	Best Comedy Series	Parks and Recreation	Nominated	
2011	Best Actress in a Comedy Series	Amy Poehler	Nominated	
2011	Best Supporting Actor in a Comedy Series	Nick Offerman	Nominated	
2012	Best Comedy Series	Parks and Recreation	Nominated	
2012	Best Actress in a Comedy Series	Amy Poehler	Won (Note: The award is shared with Zooey Deschanel for New Girl.)	
2012	Best Supporting Actor in a Comedy Series	Nick Offerman	Nominated	
2012	Best Guest Performer in a Comedy Series	Paul Rudd	Won	
2012	Best Guest Performer in a Comedy Series	Kathryn Hahn	Nominated	
2013	Best Comedy Series	Parks and Recreation	Nominated	
2013	Best Actress in a Comedy Series	Amy Poehler	Nominated	
2013	Best Actor in a Comedy Series	Adam Scott	Nominated	
2013	Best Supporting Actor in a Comedy Series	Chris Pratt	Nominated	
2013	Best Guest Performer in a Comedy Series	Patton Oswalt	Won	
2014	Best Actress in a Comedy Series	Amy Poehler	Nominated	
2014	Best Actor in a Comedy Series	Adam Scott	Nominated	

=== Emmy Awards ===
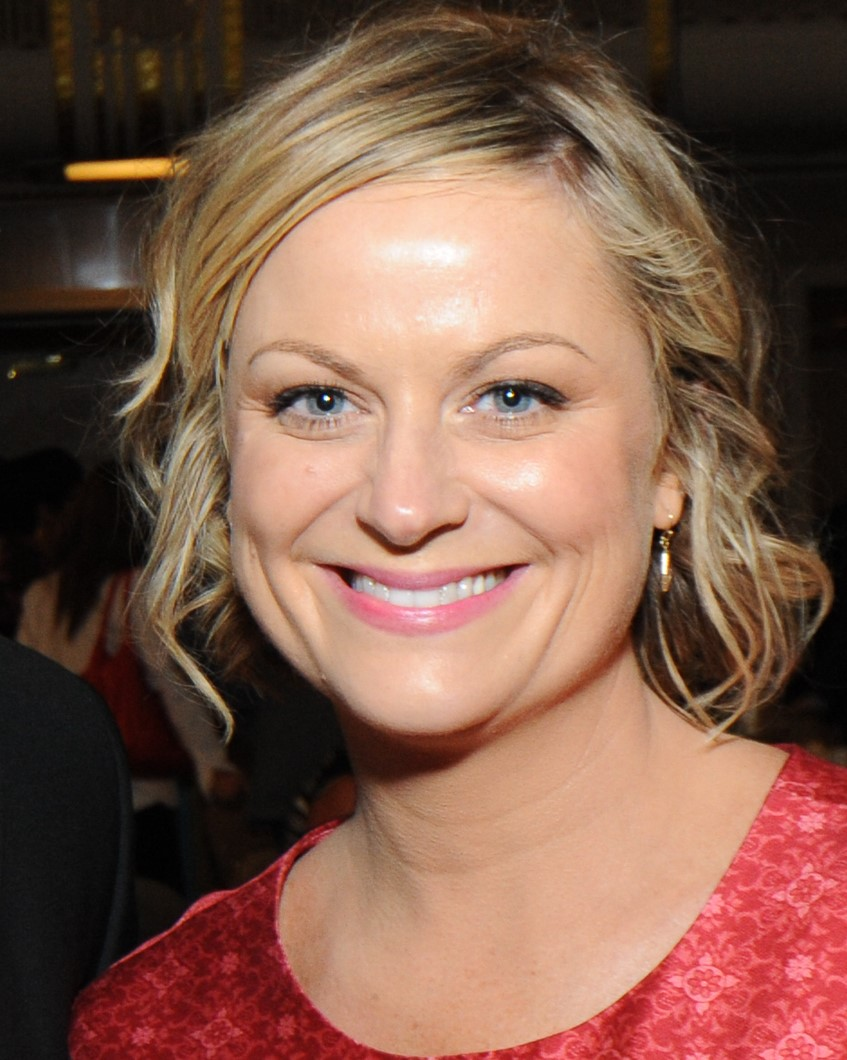
Poehler received six consecutive Primetime Emmy Award nominations for portraying Leslie Knope.

The Emmy Awards were established in 1949 in order to recognize excellence in the American television industry, and are bestowed by members of the Academy of Television Arts & Sciences. Emmy Awards are given in different ceremonies presented annually; Primetime Emmy Awards recognize outstanding work in American primetime television programming, while the Creative Arts Emmy Awards are presented to honor technical and creative achievements, and include categories recognising work of art directors, lighting and costume designers, cinematographers, casting directors, and other production-based personnel. Parks and Recreation has sixteen nominations without any wins. Poehler was nominated for the best actress six times in a row for playing Leslie Knope with an additional nomination in 2012 for writing. Michael Schur has a nomination for writing in the same year as well. Parks and Recreation has two nominations for the best comedy series. The show has four further nominations for its sound mixing and a nomination for a short-format program for NBC.com series entitled Parks and Rec in Europe.

==== Primetime Emmy Awards ====
Year	Category	Nominee(s)	Result	Ref.
2010	Outstanding Lead Actress in a Comedy Series	Amy Poehler	Nominated	
2011	Outstanding Comedy Series	Greg Daniels, Michael Schur, Howard Klein, David Miner, Dan Goor, Amy Poehler, Emily Spivey, and Morgan Sackett	Nominated	
2011	Outstanding Lead Actress in a Comedy Series	Amy Poehler	Nominated	
2012	Outstanding Lead Actress in a Comedy Series	Amy Poehler	Nominated	
2012	Outstanding Writing in a Comedy Series	Amy Poehler (for the episode "The Debate")	Nominated	
2012	Outstanding Writing in a Comedy Series	Michael Schur (for the episode "Win, Lose, or Draw")	Nominated	
2013	Outstanding Lead Actress in a Comedy Series	Amy Poehler	Nominated	
2014	Outstanding Lead Actress in a Comedy Series	Amy Poehler	Nominated	
2015	Outstanding Comedy Series	Greg Daniels, Michael Schur, Howard Klein, David Miner, Morgan Sackett, Dean Holland, Alan Yang, Harris Wittels, Donick Cary, Matt Murray, Aisha Muharrar, Dave King, David Hyman, and Amy Poehler	Nominated	
2015	Outstanding Lead Actress in a Comedy Series	Amy Poehler	Nominated	

==== Primetime Creative Arts Emmy Awards ====
Year	Category	Nominee(s)	Result	Ref.
2011	Outstanding Sound Mixing for a Comedy or Drama Series (Half-Hour) and Animation	Steve Motantz, John W. Cook II, and Peter Nusbaum (for the episode "Andy and April's Fancy Party")	Nominated	
2012	Outstanding Short-Format Live-Action Entertainment Program	Morgan Sackett, Michael Schur, and Dean Holland (Parks and Recreation: April and Andy's Road Trip, via NBC.com)	Nominated	
2012	Outstanding Sound Mixing for a Comedy or Drama Series (Half-Hour) and Animation	John W. Cook II, Peter Nusbaum, and Steve Motantz (for the episode "End of the World")	Nominated	
2013	Outstanding Sound Mixing for a Comedy or Drama Series (Half-Hour) and Animation	Steve Motantz, John W. Cook II, and Ken Kobett (for the episode "Leslie and Ben")	Nominated	
2014	Outstanding Short-Format Live-Action Entertainment Program	Morgan Sackett, Michael Schur, Dean Holland, and David Hyman (Parks and Rec in Europe, via NBC.com)	Nominated	
2015	Outstanding Sound Mixing for a Comedy or Drama Series (Half-Hour) and Animation	George Flores, John W. Cook II, and William Freesh (for the episode "One Last Ride")	Nominated	

=== GLAAD Media Awards ===
The GLAAD Media Award, established in 1990 by the American Gay & Lesbian Alliance Against Defamation, is given in order to "recognize and honor media for their fair, accurate and inclusive representations of the LGBT community and the issues that affect their lives." Parks and Recreation won once.

Year	Category	Nominee(s)	Result	Ref.
2010	Outstanding Individual Episode	Parks and Recreation (for the episode "Pawnee Zoo")	Won	

=== Golden Globe Awards ===
The Golden Globe Award, founded in 1943, recognizes the best work in both film and television. The accolade is given by the members of the Hollywood Foreign Press Association (HFPA). Parks and Recreation received four nominations with Poehler winning once in 2014.

Year	Category	Nominee(s)	Result	Ref.
2012	Best Actress – Television Series Musical or Comedy	Amy Poehler	Nominated	
2013	Best Actress – Television Series Musical or Comedy	Amy Poehler	Nominated	
2014	Best Actress – Television Series Musical or Comedy	Amy Poehler	Won	
2014	Best Television Series – Musical or Comedy	Parks and Recreation	Nominated	

=== Golden Reel Awards ===
The Golden Reel Award is presented by the Motion Picture Sound Editors to recognize achievements in sound editing for feature films, television, animation, and other categories. Parks and Recreation received one nomination.

Year	Category	Nominee(s)	Result	Ref.
2021	Outstanding Achievement in Sound Editing – Live Action Under 35:00	Brent Findley, Jason Tregoe Newman, Bryant J. Fuhrmann, and Michael Jesmer (for the episode "A Parks and Recreation Special")	Nominated	

=== Gracie Awards ===
The Gracie Award was established in 1975 by the Alliance for Women in Media to recognize the best representation of women in the media. The award is given to various types of programming or individuals. Parks and Recreation has two wins.

Year	Category	Nominee(s)	Result	Ref.
2013	Outstanding Female Actor in a Leading Role in a Comedy Series	Amy Poehler	Won	
2013	Outstanding Comedy	Parks and Recreation	Won	

=== Imagen Awards ===
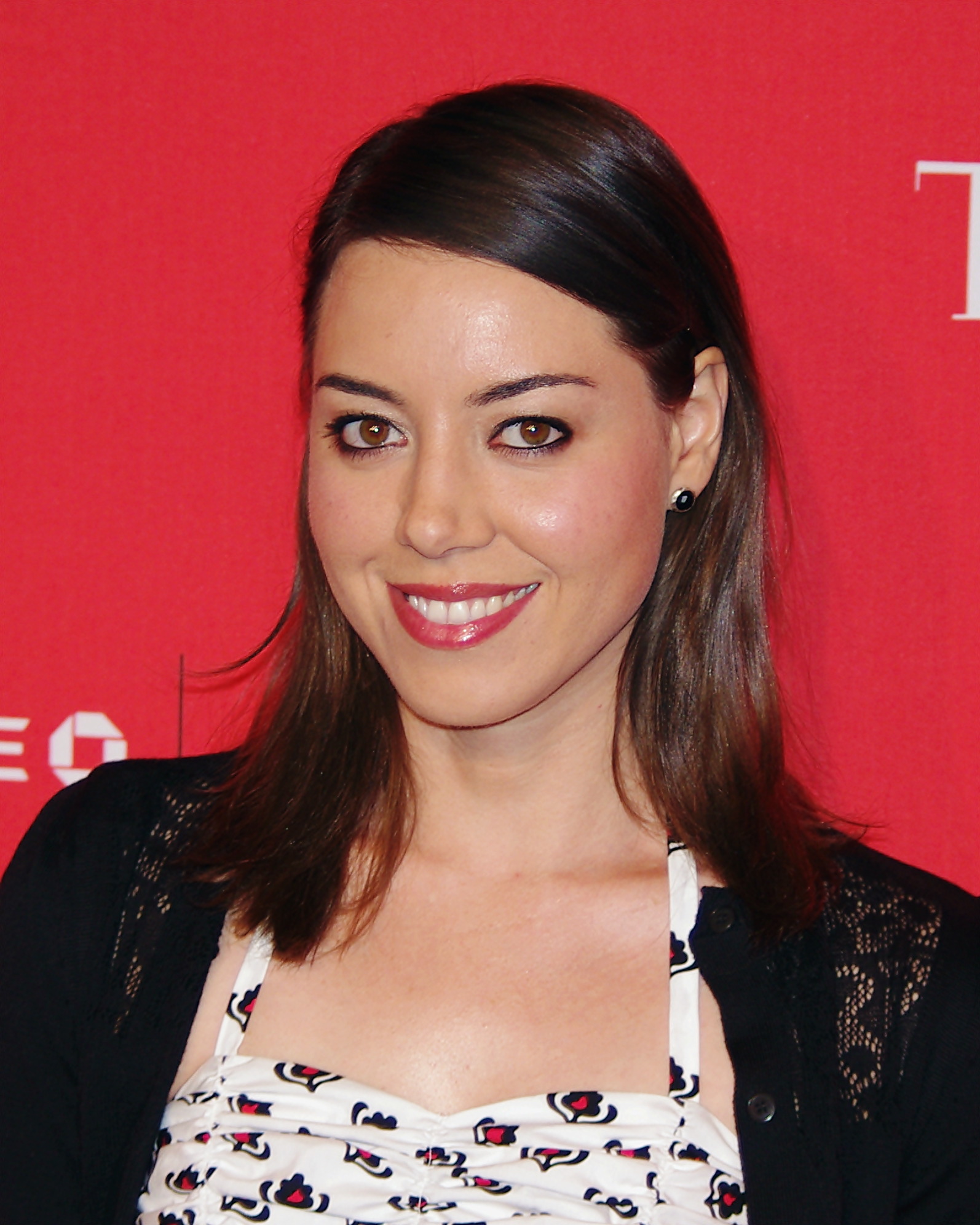
Plaza, who portrays April Ludgate in the series, was nominated for an Imagen Award four times.

The Imagen Award is organized by the Imagen Foundation, an American organization dedicated to "recognize and reward positive portrayals of Latinos in all forms of media". Plaza was nominated four times.

Year	Category	Nominee(s)	Result	Ref.
2010	Best Supporting Actress/Television	Aubrey Plaza	Nominated	
2012	Best Supporting Actress/Television	Aubrey Plaza	Nominated	
2013	Best Supporting Actress/Television	Aubrey Plaza	Nominated	
2014	Best Supporting Actress/Television	Aubrey Plaza	Nominated	

=== NAACP Image Awards ===
The NAACP Image Award, presented annually by the American National Association for the Advancement of Colored People, was established 1967 in order to honor people of color for their work in film, television, music, and literature. The series has two wins out of six nominations, both won by Ken Whittingham for directing.

Year	Category	Nominee(s)	Result	Ref.
2013	Outstanding Directing in a Comedy Series	Ken Whittingham (for the episode "How a Bill Becomes a Law")	Won	
2013	Outstanding Supporting Actress in a Comedy Series	Rashida Jones	Nominated	
2013	Outstanding Supporting Actor in a Comedy Series	Aziz Ansari	Nominated	
2014	Outstanding Supporting Actress in a Comedy Series	Rashida Jones	Nominated	
2015	Outstanding Directing in a Comedy Series	Ken Whittingham (for the episode "Prom")	Won	
2015	Outstanding Writing in a Comedy Series	Aisha Muharrar (for the episode "Ann and Chris")	Nominated	

=== Peabody Awards ===
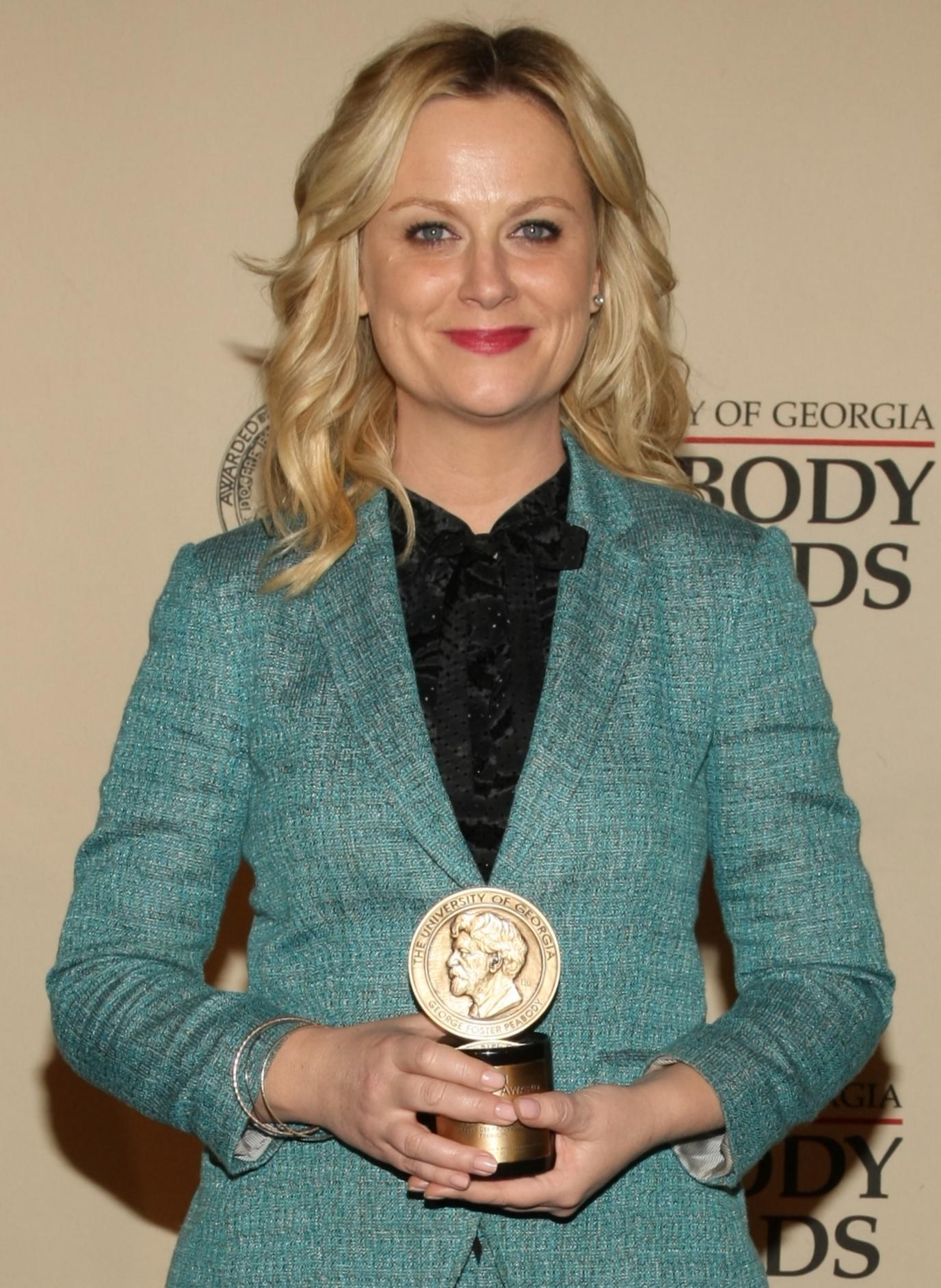
Poehler accepting the Peabody Award on behalf of the show in 2012

The Peabody Award recognizes excellence in various platforms of the media, including film, television, and radio. The award "spotlight[s] instances of how electronic media can teach, expand our horizons, defend the public interest, or encourage empathy with others". Parks and Recreation was honored in 2012. The award association gave the following description of the show:

[...] Parks and Recreation has crafted Pawnee into a diverse and lived-in community at once cartoonish and startlingly real, a great playground for its central cast and ever-expanding roster of peripheral characters. For developing a hilarious venue to explore the good side of American democracy in an age when that side is so rarely on display, Parks and Recreation earns a Peabody Award.

Year	Category	Nominee(s)	Result	Ref.
2012	–	Parks and Recreation	Won	

=== Producers Guild of America Awards ===
The Producers Guild of America Award is bestowed by the Producers Guild of America to honor the work of producers in film and television. Parks and Recreation has one nomination.

Year	Category	Nominee(s)	Result	Ref.
2012	Outstanding Producer of Episodic Television, Comedy	Greg Daniels, Dan Goor, Howard Klein, Amy Poehler, Morgan Sackett, and Michael Schur	Nominated	

=== Satellite Awards ===
The Satellite Award is given annually by the International Press Academy (IPA) to honor the best work in the entertainment industry. Poehler received three nominations while Parks and Recreation was nominated once as a series.

Year	Category	Nominee(s)	Result	Ref.
2011	Best Actress – Television Series Musical or Comedy	Amy Poehler	Nominated	
2012	Best Television Series – Musical or Comedy	Parks and Recreation	Nominated	
2012	Best Actress – Television Series Musical or Comedy	Amy Poehler	Nominated	
2014	Best Actress – Television Series Musical or Comedy	Amy Poehler	Nominated	
2016	Best Actress – Television Series Musical or Comedy	Amy Poehler	Nominated	

=== Screen Actors Guild Awards ===
The Screen Actors Guild Award, given by the Screen Actors Guild‐American Federation of Television and Radio Artists (SAG-AFTRA), is an award dedicated to honor the best performances of actors in film and television. Poehler received three nominations.

Year	Category	Nominee(s)	Result	Ref.
2013	Outstanding Performance by a Female Actor in a Comedy Series	Amy Poehler	Nominated	
2015	Outstanding Performance by a Female Actor in a Comedy Series	Amy Poehler	Nominated	
2016	Outstanding Performance by a Female Actor in a Comedy Series	Amy Poehler	Nominated	

=== Writers Guild of America Awards ===
First presented in 1949, the Writers Guild of America Award recognizes the work of film, television and radio screenwriters. Parks and Recreation was nominated five times between 2012 and 2014, including three times for the best series and twice for an individual episode.

Year	Category	Nominee(s)	Result	Ref.
2012	Comedy Series	Greg Daniels, Katie Dippold, Dan Goor, Norm Hiscock, Emily Kapnek, Dave King, Greg Levine, Aisha Muharrar, Chelsea Peretti, Amy Poehler, Brian Rowe, Michael Schur, Mike Scully, Emily Spivey, Alan Yang, and Harris Wittels	Nominated	
2013	Episodic Comedy	Amy Poehler (for the episode "The Debate")	Nominated	
2013	Comedy Series	Megan Amram, Greg Daniels, Nate Dimeo, Katie Dippold, Dan Goor, Norm Hiscock, Dave King, Greg Levine, Joe Mande, Aisha Muharrar, Nick Offerman, Chelsea Peretti, Amy Poehler, Alexandra Rushfield, Mike Scully, Michael Schur, Harris Wittels, and Alan Yang	Nominated	
2014	Episodic Comedy	Michael Schur and Alan Yang (for the episode "Leslie and Ben")	Nominated	
2014	Comedy Series	Megan Amram, Donick Cary, Greg Daniels, Nate DiMeo, Emma Fletcher, Rachna Fruchbom, Dan Goor, Norm Hiscock, Matt Hubbard, Dave King, Greg Levine, Joe Mande, Sam Means, Aisha Muharrar, Matt Murray, Amy Poehler, Alexandra Rushfield, Michael Schur, Jen Statsky, Harris Wittels, and Alan Yang	Nominated	
