= Swing Vote (disambiguation) =

Swing Vote may refer to:

- Swing vote, a vote that may go to any of a number of candidates in an election
- Swing Vote (1999 film), directed by David Anspaugh
- Swing Vote (2008 film), directed by Joshua Michael Stern
- "Swing Vote", a Parks and Recreation season 5 episode
