= Kaboom (Parks and Recreation) =

- Parks and Recreation episode
- Episode no.: Season 2 Episode 6
- Directed by: Charles McDougall
- Written by: Aisha Muharrar
- Original air date: October 22, 2009

Guest appearances
- H. Jon Benjamin as Scott Braddock; Jim O'Heir as Jerry Gergich; Retta as Donna Meagle; Paul Scheer as Keef Slertner; Chris Tallman as Wendell Adams

Episode chronology
| ← Previous "Sister City" | Next → "Greg Pikitis" |
- Parks and Recreation season 2

"Kaboom" is the sixth episode of the second season of Parks and Recreation, and the twelfth overall episode of the series. It originally aired on NBC in the United States on October 22, 2009. In the episode, Leslie tries to have the pit filled in and injures Andy in the process, opening Pawnee up to a possible lawsuit.

The episode was written by Aisha Muharrar and directed by Charles McDougall, and featured guest performances by comedians Paul Scheer and H. Jon Benjamin. "Kaboom" saw the filling in of the Pawnee pit, a focal plot device in Parks and Recreation since the first episode. As part of a multi-network television campaign to spotlight volunteerism, the episode prominently featured the real-life organization KaBOOM!, a charity that builds playgrounds in locations all over the United States.

According to Nielsen Media Research, the episode was seen by 4.98 million household viewers, an improvement over the previous week. "Kaboom" received generally positive reviews, with several commentators praising the series for resolving the long-standing pit subplot.

== Plot ==
The episode opens with Leslie receiving a speakerphone call about abnormal transactions on her credit card. The purchases turn out to all be legitimate, but Leslie cancels the card anyway out of embarrassment when Tom hears about her unusual purchases, including a "bucket of cake", a man pillow in the shape of Daniel Craig, and tuition to Hogwarts School of Witchcraft and Wizardry. Later, the parks department and Ann visit neighboring Indiana town Eagleton to help build a playground in a single day, as part of an event by the charity KaBOOM! There, Leslie and Ann find Ann's ex-boyfriend Andy, who claims to be volunteering, but in reality, is coming for the free food. He tells Leslie and Ann that he now has a home with the drummer of his band. Leslie is inspired by the energy of the group and its leader Keef, which prompts her to take proactive measures in filling in the pit in Pawnee and turning it into a park. While discussing the matter with her parks department, Mark takes her aside and suggests she simply fill it in without permission. Leslie decides to take his advice and rents an excavator to fill in the pit.

Leslie meets Ann at the pit with the rented excavator, which starts filling it in with dirt. However, they failed to realize Andy is still living there in a tent, and he is injured when mounds of dirt fall on him. He is taken to the hospital, where Ann is assigned as his nurse. An angry Ron tells Leslie the town is now open to a large potential lawsuit from Andy, and he sends her to visit him along with their city attorney Scott. Meanwhile, Andy is excited to be near Ann and insists it will lead to them getting back together, but Ann tells him she is very happy dating Mark, who unlike Andy has a job, apartment and future. A disheartened Andy decides he has to get money to impress Ann. When Leslie visits, he regretfully tells her he and his attorney Wendell Adams are going to sue Pawnee.

Leslie is convinced she can reason with Andy if they can talk without their lawyers, as Scott strictly polices anything that is said, but Andy will not return her calls. Finally, Ann calls Andy and asks him to come to her house to talk. Later that day, he arrives completely naked, having assumed Ann wanted to take him back. A disgusted Ann leaves the house, leaving Leslie and Andy to talk. Andy admits he is suing the town in an attempt to win Ann back, since she wants someone "with a bank account", and she thinks of a different way he can impress her. The next day at city hall, Andy tells Leslie and Scott he will drop the lawsuit if they agree to fill in the pit right away. Scott agrees, unaware it was a trick between Andy and Leslie. The next day the pit is filled in and turned into a lot, and an impressed Ann waves at Andy while the construction work is going on. Keef riding a motorboat, revealing his role in KaBOOM! was an elaborate prank to get the playground built, and announcing he is going to build a hospital in a poor part of China for his next prank.

== Production ==
"Kaboom" was written by Aisha Muharrar and directed by Charles McDougall. The Pawnee pit, which has been a focal plot device in Parks and Recreation since the first episode, is filled in during this episode. "Kaboom" features actor and comedian Paul Scheer in a guest appearance as the KaBOOM! organizer. Scheer has previously worked with Aziz Ansari on the MTV sketch comedy show, Human Giant. "Kaboom" also featured H. Jon Benjamin, a voice actor from Archer, Dr. Katz, and Home Movies, as Pawnee's lawyer.

Chris Pratt actually appeared naked during filming of a scene in which he arrived at Ann's house without clothes on. Michael Schur, co-creator of Parks and Recreation, said the scene was written because Pratt "loves taking his clothes off". Pratt's nudity was improvised- done after a few takes in the industry-standard nude boxers- because Pratt felt he wasn't getting the right reaction during filming wearing the boxers. Though the improvised take made the final cut and Amy Poehler and Rashida Jones were good humoured about the incident, Pratt still received a warning letter from NBC over his stunt.

The script prominently features KaBOOM!, a real-life charitable organization that builds playgrounds in locations all over the United States. Parks and Recreation included the charity in the episode as part of a charity campaign called "I Participate", sponsored by the Entertainment Industry Foundation. The campaign involves more than 60 shows on NBC ABC, CBS, Fox and several other networks, all of which spotlighted real-life charities in an effort to encourage volunteerism. Greg Daniels, the series executive producer and co-creator, was responsible for choosing the KaBOOM! charity. In an editorial featured on The Huffington Post after "Kaboom" aired, KaBOOM! chief executive officer Darell Hammond called the episode "Ka-PERFECT!" and said, "The writers certainly captured the spirit that fuels each of our (playground) builds – something that inspires volunteers to continue their great work and strive even harder to give back to their communities."

Within a week of the episode's original broadcast, two deleted scenes from "Kaboom" were made available on the official Parks and Recreation website. The first two-minute clip included extended scenes of the KABOOM! park construction, including Tom text messaging instead of working, Leslie and Ann competing with children, and Paul Scheer doing the Worm dance move. Leslie also seeks advice from her mother (played by Pamela Reed) after putting Pawnee in danger of a lawsuit. In the second, 15-second clip, Ann complains to Mark about Andy appearing naked at her apartment, which Mark only finds amusing.

Revealed in the Parks and Recollection podcast with Rob Lowe and Alan Yang, the ending scene was a late night inclusion that caused mixed reactions within the team. After the episode first aired, a message showed up to explain Kaboom! is a real charity, not a prank.

== Cultural references ==
Andy says he volunteers at several organizations in order to get their free food at their events. He specifically identifies the Red Cross, which he says has "amazing cookies", and Meals on Wheels, which he described as a "bonanza".

== Reception ==
In its original American broadcast on October 22, 2009, "Kaboom" was seen by 4.98 million household viewers, according to Nielsen Media Research. It was a slight increase from the previous week's episode, "Sister City". "Kaboom" received a 2.1 rating/6 share among viewers aged between 18 and 49. The episode received generally positive reviews. Steve Heisler of The A.V. Club said "Kaboom" was the best episode of the second season, and called Parks and Recreation "one of the funniest shows on TV right now". Heisler praised the show for not shying away from outrageousness, and called Andy's naked entrance "by far the highlight of the series". Entertainment Weekly writer Henning Fog said "Kaboom" continued a trend of superior Parks episodes in season two, and praised the episode for filling in the pit, claiming it "both tied up a plot thread that had overstayed its welcome and put to rest any lingering ghosts from the first six episodes". Matt Fowler of IGN said the episode was funny and served as good character development for Leslie and Andy. But Fowler also said "some scenes fell flat", and questioned why Ann would continue to harbor feelings for the immature Andy.
