= Parks and Recreation season 5 =

Parks and Recreation
- Season 5
- Region 1 DVD cover art
- Showrunner: Michael Schur
- Starring: Amy Poehler; Rashida Jones; Aziz Ansari; Nick Offerman; Aubrey Plaza; Chris Pratt; Adam Scott; Rob Lowe; Jim O'Heir; Retta
- No. of episodes: 22

Release
- Original network: NBC
- Original release: September 20, 2012 – May 2, 2013

Season chronology
- ← Previous; Season 4 Next → Season 6

The fifth season of Parks and Recreation originally aired in the United States on the NBC television network, from September 20, 2012, and concluded on May 2, 2013. This season consisted of 22 episodes. It stars Amy Poehler, Rashida Jones, Aziz Ansari, Nick Offerman, Aubrey Plaza, Chris Pratt, Adam Scott, and Rob Lowe, with supporting performances from Jim O'Heir and Retta.

Season 5 focuses on Leslie Knope (Amy Poehler) and her staff at the parks and recreation department of the fictional Indiana town of Pawnee. Although not having an overarching storyline like Season 4, this season details the aftermath of Leslie's role as a Councilwoman in Pawnee, and her rivalry with councilman Jeremy Jamm (Jon Glaser). Other storylines include Ben Wyatt (Adam Scott) and April Ludgate (Aubrey Plaza)'s career move to Washington D.C., Ann Perkins (Rashida Jones)'s attempts to get pregnant, the progress in Ben and Leslie's relationship, Andy's attempts at becoming a police officer, and Ron Swanson (Nick Offerman) meeting single mother Diane (Lucy Lawless).

== Cast ==
=== Main ===
- Amy Poehler as Leslie Knope, is a council woman for the town of Pawnee, with a strong love of her home town, who has not let politics dampen her sense of optimism; her ultimate goal is to become President of the United States. Poehler departed from the NBC sketch comedy series Saturday Night Live, where she was a cast member for nearly seven years, to star in Parks and Recreation. It was only after she was cast that Daniels and Schur established the general concept of the show and the script for the pilot was written.
- Rashida Jones as Ann Perkins, a nurse and political outsider who becomes Leslie's best friend and also becomes more involved in Pawnee government through her friendship with Leslie.
- Aziz Ansari as Tom Haverford, Leslie's sarcastic and underachieving subordinate who seeks to present himself as extremely hip and trendy and always has a scheme in the works.
- Nick Offerman as Ron Swanson, the deadpan parks and recreation director who, as a libertarian, believes in as small a government as possible. As such, Ron strives to make his department as ineffective as possible, and favors hiring employees who do not care about their jobs or are poor at them. Nevertheless, Ron consistently demonstrates that he secretly cares deeply about his co-workers.
- Aubrey Plaza as April Ludgate, a cynical and uninterested parks department intern who eventually becomes the perfect assistant for Ron, but leaves the department with Ben Wyatt.
- Chris Pratt as Andy Dwyer, a goofy and dim-witted but lovable slacker; he is April's husband.
- Adam Scott as Ben Wyatt, Leslie's boyfriend, and later husband, who leaves Pawnee for Washington, D.C., to join a political campaign.
- Rob Lowe as Chris Traeger, an excessively positive and extremely health-conscious government official.

=== Starring ===
- Jim O'Heir as Jerry Gergich, a sweet-natured but painfully incompetent longtime city employee who is the main target of the office's petty unkindness, yet enjoys his life as the husband of a gorgeous woman and the father of three beautiful daughters.
- Retta as Donna Meagle, a no-nonsense administrative assistant in the department, who comes from a wealthy family, and frequently mentions her many boyfriends, both past and present.

== Production ==
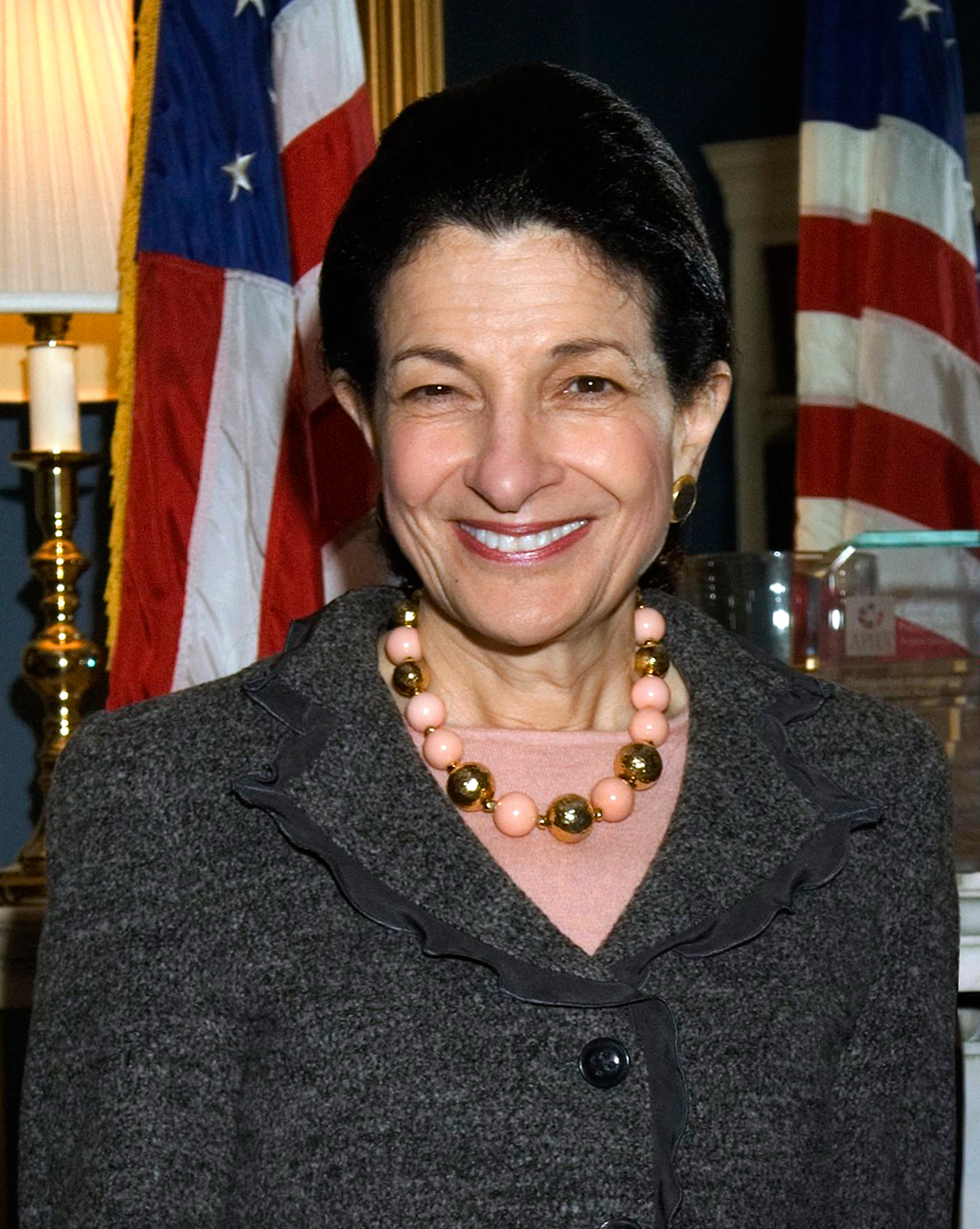
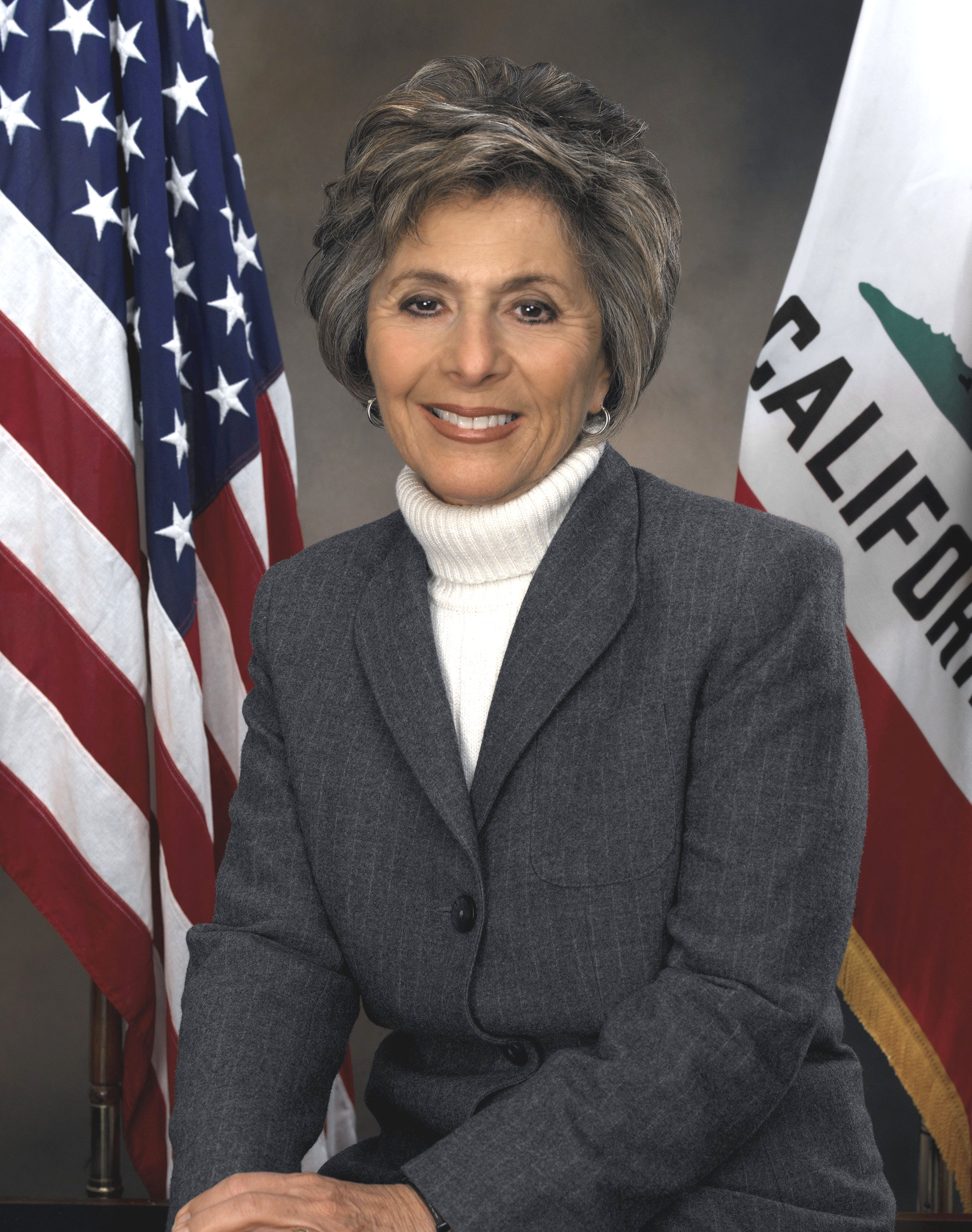
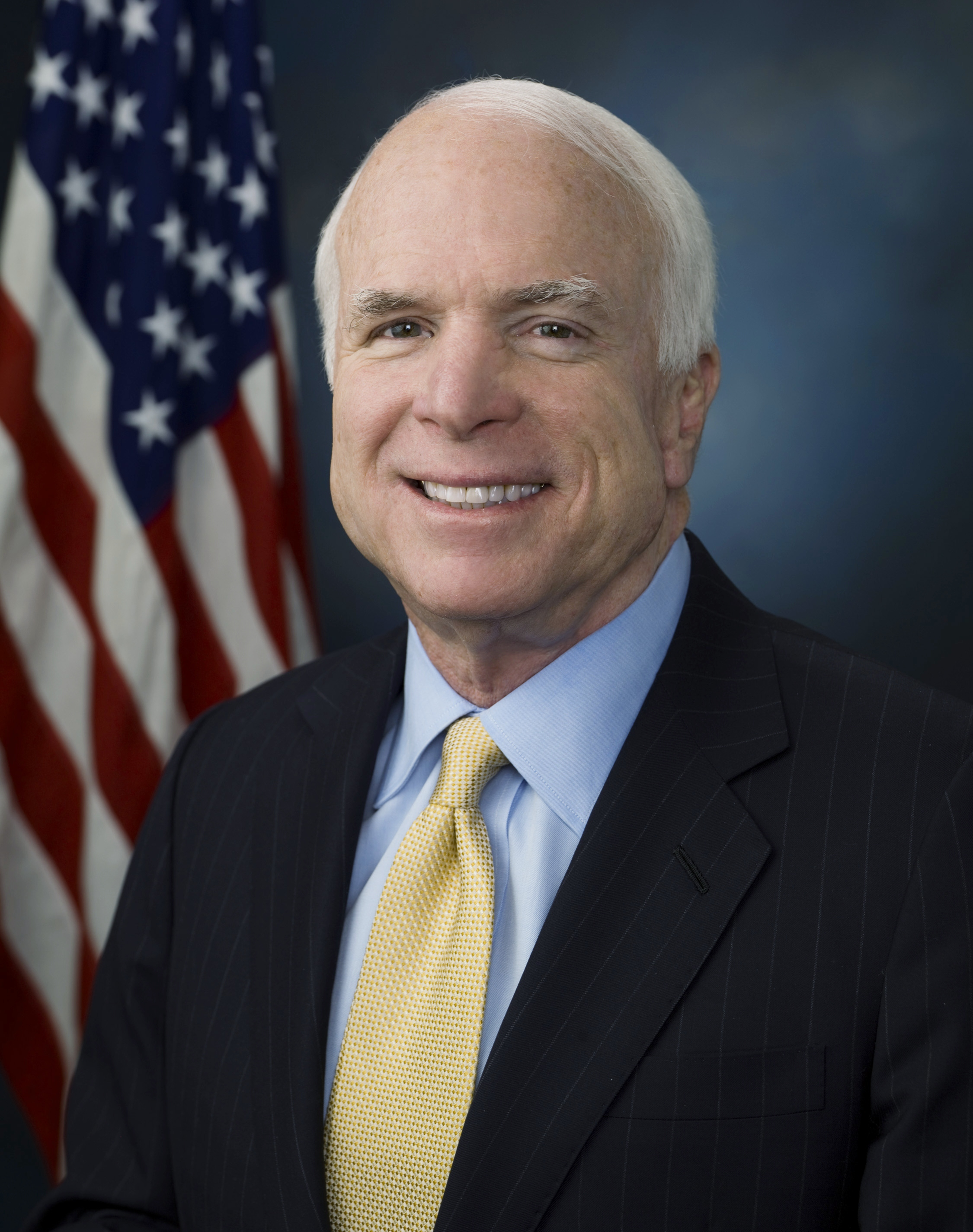
Season five featured cameos from senators Olympia Snowe (left), Barbara Boxer (middle), and John McCain (right)

=== Filming ===
Portions of the season premiere "Ms. Knope Goes to Washington" and later episode "Leslie vs. April" were shot in Washington, D.C. in July 2012. These episodes featured cameo appearances from senators Barbara Boxer, Olympia Snowe, and John McCain, and then Vice President Joe Biden.

The tenth episode of the season, "Two Parties", featured scenes shot in Indianapolis at Lucas Oil Stadium and St. Elmo Steak House in December 2012. This episode included cameos from Indianapolis Colts players Andrew Luck and Reggie Wayne and owner Jim Irsay, Indiana Pacers players Miles Plumlee and Roy Hibbert, and Newt Gingrich.

=== Writing ===
The fourteenth episode of the season, "Leslie and Ben", was initially written to serve as the season finale of a 13-episode run as the writers were unsure how many episodes would be commissioned. Eventually, 22 were ordered and the episode "Women in Garbage" was shown earlier in the schedule despite being written as one of the season's "back nine".

== Episodes ==
^{†} denotes an extended episode.

Parks and Recreation, season 5 episodes
No. overall	No. in season	Title	Directed by	Written by	Original release date	U.S. viewers (millions)
69	1	"Ms. Knope Goes to Washington"	Dean Holland	Aisha Muharrar	September 20, 2012	3.50
Leslie and Andy visit Ben and April in Washington DC, while Ron attempts to organize a barbecue for the staff.
70	2	"Soda Tax"	Kyle Newacheck	Norm Hiscock	September 27, 2012	3.27
Leslie faces obstacles while trying to pass a soda tax, while Andy trains for his upcoming police physical examination. In Washington, D.C., Ben tries to connect with his interns.
71	3	"How a Bill Becomes a Law"	Ken Whittingham	Dan Goor	October 4, 2012	3.53
Leslie negotiates with a hateful fellow City Councilman to pass a bill extending public pool hours. Chris creates a 3-1-1 hotline for citizens to call with their problems leading Ron to help a citizen (Diane) fix a pothole in front of her house. In Washington, D.C., Ben and April try to take a road trip to visit Leslie and Andy.
72	4	"Sex Education"	Craig Zisk	Alan Yang	October 18, 2012	3.46
Leslie holds a sex-education class following an STD outbreak among senior citizens in Pawnee; when Tom's gadgets are taken away, Ron helps him acclimatize to life without technology; April and Ben meet Congressman Murray.
73	5	"Halloween Surprise"^{†}	Dean Holland	Michael Schur	October 25, 2012	3.34
Ben gets a job offer to run a political campaign in Florida, forcing Leslie to think about their future. Ron and Andy take Diane's girls trick-or-treating and Tom looks for a new business idea. Ben returns to Pawnee and proposes to Leslie.
74	6	"Ben's Parents"	Dean Holland	Greg Levine	November 8, 2012	3.46
Leslie meets Ben's unhappily-divorced parents while Jean-Ralphio "helps" Tom prepare the pitch for his new business idea. Elsewhere, a depressed Chris has mood swings.
75	7	"Leslie vs. April"	Wendey Stanzler	Harris Wittels	November 15, 2012	3.52
April tries to get Lot 48 turned into a dog park, upsetting Leslie; Andy improves his crime scene investigation skills. Ben takes a job at an accounting firm, but in the course of helping Tom secure funding for his new clothes rental business Rent-A-Swag, receives several other job offers.
76	8	"Pawnee Commons"	Morgan Sackett	Alexandra Rushfield	November 29, 2012	2.99
Leslie asks the public for design suggestions for the park on Lot 48 – now called the Pawnee Commons, but is suspicious when the best design comes from an Eagleton architect, Wreston St. James (Brad Hall); Tom asks the office for help with his new business; Andy, with help from April, tries to make his new job as a city hall security guard exciting.
77	9	"Ron and Diane"	Dan Goor	Megan Amram & Aisha Muharrar	December 6, 2012	3.27
Ron and Diane go to a woodworking award show to recognize one of Ron's pieces, when Tammy II shows up. Jerry and his wife throw a holiday party and some of Jerry's co-workers are not invited, while others are quite shocked by Jerry's stunningly happy domestic life.
78	10	"Two Parties"	Dean Holland	Dave King	January 17, 2013	3.92
Ann throws Leslie a bachelorette party that gets interrupted by a scheming Councilman Jamm's attempts to put a fast food restaurant on Lot 48. Chris holds a bachelor party for Ben but ends up throwing one for each of Jerry, Tom, Andy and Ron when he learns they did not have one before their weddings.
79	11	"Women in Garbage"	Norm Hiscock	Harris Wittels	January 24, 2013	3.94
Leslie and April work a garbage route to show the sexist Pawnee government officials that women are qualified to do so. Elsewhere, Tom's lack of basketball ability leads to dubious help from Andy and Ben, while Ron must babysit Diane's kids and asks Ann for help.
80	12	"Ann's Decision"	Ken Whittingham	Nate DiMeo	February 7, 2013	3.76
Ann decides she wants to be a single mother, and the unimpressive candidate pool for potential sperm donors leads to meddling from Leslie. Meanwhile, Ben, Chris and Ron all get food poisoning when choosing a caterer for the wedding, and April is tasked with running a public forum on the Pawnee Commons project.
81	13	"Emergency Response"^{†}	Dean Holland	Norm Hiscock & Joe Mande	February 14, 2013	3.18
An emergency response drill interrupts Leslie and Ben's fundraising gala for the Commons, while Andy prepares for his Police Academy exam. After Councilman Jamm sabotages the drill, asking the state representative to make the drill longer than it has to be, Ben takes over planning the gala. Leslie goes along with the drill until she realizes Jamm's scheme, when she decides to "kill" the whole town to end the drill sooner. She returns to the gala where Ben suggests they get married that night.
82	14	"Leslie and Ben"	Craig Zisk	Michael Schur & Alan Yang	February 21, 2013	3.07
Leslie and Ben decide to get married at the gala, cramming months of planning into two hours, but the ceremony is crashed by Councilman Jamm.
83	15	"Correspondents' Lunch"	Nick Offerman	Alexandra Rushfield	February 21, 2013	2.95
Leslie is excited to be speaking at a luncheon for journalists, but when an obnoxious tabloid reporter steals her jokes, she sets out to get revenge. Ben is unsure how to handle his new job running a charity for the Sweetums company, until some sound ideas from Andy help him set a new course. Ann continues to search for someone with whom to have a baby.
84	16	"Bailout"	Craig Zisk	Joe Mande	March 14, 2013	3.00
Leslie tries to save a video store from going out of business, declaring it a cultural and historical landmark, but the government bailout has an adverse effect. Meanwhile, Chris helps Tom with a difficult employee, and Ann is determined to make April her friend.
85	17	"Partridge"	Tristram Shapeero	Dave King	April 4, 2013	2.93
Ben and Leslie travel to Ben's hometown of Partridge, Minnesota, of which he was mayor as a teenager, for a ceremony to give him the key to the city. Ann and Chris take tests to determine their compatibility as parents but do poorly on them all. Councilman Jamm sues Ron for punching him during Leslie and Ben's wedding in "Leslie and Ben". April, Andy and Tom testify on Ron's behalf, and later, the three blackmail Jamm into dropping the lawsuit.
86	18	"Animal Control"	Craig Zisk	Megan Amram	April 11, 2013	3.15
Leslie sets her sights on fixing the animal control department. Elsewhere, Ron needs medical help from Ann that he strongly resists; Ben, Tom and Andy continue working for the Sweetums charity foundation and find themselves trying to get Dennis Feinstein to make a large donation.
87	19	"Article Two"	Amy Poehler	Matt Murray	April 18, 2013	3.35
Leslie sets out to remove the town's outdated laws, but receives opposition from a local history buff. Ron and April take a management training course led by Chris, while Ann and Ben struggle to get a great gift for Leslie.
88	20	"Jerry's Retirement"	Nicole Holofcener	Norm Hiscock & Aisha Muharrar	April 18, 2013	3.34
Jerry is retiring and Leslie wants to help him achieve the goals he listed when he first started working for the government 40 years ago. Leslie feels bad for not being able to do so, but he shows Leslie his family albums and reminds Leslie that there is more to life than work achievements. With Jerry no longer working, Tom becomes the butt of the office's jokes and insults. Ron later brings back Jerry for a few hours a week to help deflect the insults from Tom. Chris and Ann talk more about having a baby and restart their relationship.
89	21	"Swing Vote"	Alan Yang	Joe Mande & Alan Yang	April 25, 2013	2.59
Ron issues some budget cuts and Leslie finds herself going overboard to save a local mini-golf facility, trying to win the vote of Councilman Jamm to do so. Tom asks Ann for relationship advice when he can't handle his horrible girlfriend.
90	22	"Are You Better Off?"	Dean Holland	Michael Schur	May 2, 2013	2.99
At the end of her first year as a city councilwoman, Leslie's changes in the town prove to be unpopular and several locals launch a campaign to have her recalled from office. Andy brings Burt Macklin back to help find the owner of a positive pregnancy test. Tom looks to further his business but faces competition.

== Reception ==
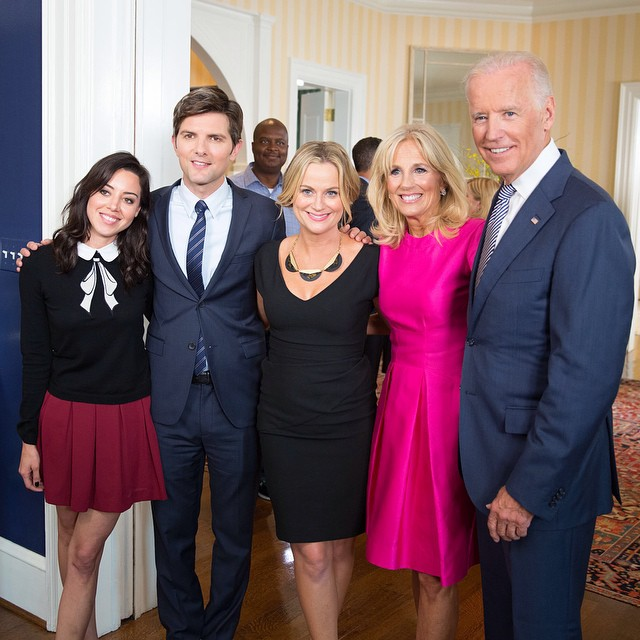
Joe and Jill Biden with cast members

The fifth season of Parks and Recreation received highly positive reviews. On Rotten Tomatoes, the season has a 96% approval rating with an average score of 8.7 out of 10 based on 24 reviews. The site's critical consensus reads, "Heartfelt yet hilarious and snarky yet good-natured, Parks and Recreation remains one of the best sitcoms around and only continues to improve". Amy Poehler received her fourth consecutive nomination for the Primetime Emmy Award for Outstanding Lead Actress in a Comedy Series.
