= Halloween Surprise =

- Parks and Recreation episode
- Episode no.: Season 5 Episode 5
- Directed by: Dean Holland
- Written by: Michael Schur
- Original air date: October 25, 2012

Guest appearances
- Lucy Lawless as Diane Lewis; Kathryn Hahn as Jennifer Barkley

Episode chronology
← Previous "Sex Education"	Next → "Ben's Parents"
- Parks and Recreation season 5

"Halloween Surprise" is the fifth episode of the fifth season of the American comedy television series Parks and Recreation, and the 73rd overall episode of the series. It originally aired on NBC in the United States on October 25, 2012.

In the episode, Leslie (Amy Poehler) and Ben (Adam Scott) try to decide if Ben should continue his campaign manager career or return to Pawnee, Jerry (Jim O'Heir) has a heart attack, Tom (Aziz Ansari) comes up with a new business plan, and Ron (Nick Offerman) struggles in his relationship with Diane (Lucy Lawless).

== Plot ==
In the cold open, Diane invites Ron to go trick or treating with her and her daughters. Although Ron at first declines, Andy is enjoying playing with the children, and begs to come. Later, they are seen trick-or-treating. Diane and both of her daughters are dressed as princesses, while Andy is dressed as a policeman, and Ron is, once again, a pirate. Andy is practicing his observation skills in preparation for the police exam, and carries a tape recorder to describe things around him, including a tree, his hand, and parents handing out candy. Diane is called away by her job, leaving Andy and Ron to take the girls trick-or-treating. The night goes poorly when Ron's attempt to mediate a dispute between the girls ends with them both in tears. Diane leaves an angry voicemail for Ron, and he reflects that he is not ready for an entire family. When Diane later apologizes, Ron does not reciprocate, causing her to tell him goodbye. After April and Andy criticize his actions, he changes his mind, and goes to Diane's house with gifts. He apologizes, explaining that he has spent most of his life alone and is not used to children. Diane invites him inside. They all then go trick-or-treating, despite it being a week after Halloween.

Meanwhile, Leslie and Ann are viewing houses in preparation for Leslie and Ben to move in together when he returns from Washington. In Washington, Ben announces that the campaign he has been working on is complete, and they have won. April leaves immediately to return to Pawnee. Jennifer Barkley talks to him about his future career, offering him the opportunity to work on another campaign. However, when he tells Leslie, she is upset because she was counting on him returning to Pawnee shortly. Ben promises that everything is still preliminary.

In the Parks Department, Chris screens a movie, Death Canoe 4: Murder at Blood Lake, in honor of Halloween, and says that he intends to dress as his "greatest fear". Later in the episode, Chris is seen in costume as an old man. At the screening, Donna loudly comments on the movie, as well as live-tweeting her reactions to it. She is not in costume, though nearly everyone else is, including Tom as a ghost, Leslie as Rosie the Riveter, and Ann as Gabby Douglas. Leslie discusses her problems with Ben with Ann, who suggests they cheer up by scaring Tom, who has just left the movie screening to use the restroom. They do so, but instead accidentally surprise Jerry, who has a heart attack (which they call a "fart attack" due to him passing gas at the same time). While in the hospital, Jerry mentions that he is worried about the medical bills, but Leslie promises to make sure he has the future he had planned. She arranges for the Parks Department to hold a garage sale to raise money. Tom attempts to sell some of his clothing, but a woman refuses to buy a jacket because her son would soon outgrow it. This inspires Tom to create a new business: Rent-a-Swag, which rents expensive clothing to "teens, tweens, and everyone in between". Leslie is disappointed by the low funds raised by the sale, projecting her own fears about her unstable future onto Jerry. However, he reminds her that you can't plan the future. Meanwhile, Jennifer and Ben have a meeting about him beginning to run a new campaign. She advises him to "think about your future".

In the final scene, Leslie is viewing the house a final time before cancelling her lease on it. Unexpectedly, Ben arrives, dressed in a suit, and proposes. Leslie accepts, and they kiss.

== Production ==
"Halloween Surprise" was written by Michael Schur and directed by Dean Holland. Within a week of the episode's original broadcast, a deleted scene was placed on the official Parks and Recreation website. The 120-second clip extends the scene of Donna live-tweeting the movie. An extended "Producer's Cut" was also made available on NBC's website and Hulu. This cut included an extra five minutes.

NBC also produced a photo gallery for the episode. This gallery, titled "Halloween Costumes", is a series of seventeen stills from the three Halloween episodes of Parks and Recreation (Greg Pikitis in Season 2, "Meet n Greet" in Season 4, and this episode), showing multiple characters' costumes. A running joke regarding Ron's pirate costume is referenced, with three photos showing this same costume. Viewers were invited to vote for their favorite costume.

== Cultural references ==
When viewing a house, Leslie claims that she will need three bedrooms, as one is intended for Oprah Winfrey: "that's where Oprah stays when she's in town". This reference continues a long-running joke of Leslie attempting to seek Oprah's attention. Donna's constant live-tweeting this episode is a reference to the actress Retta, whose own Twitter account is very popular online, and where she often reviews TV shows.

During the garage sale, Andy is seen wearing a Pearl Jam shirt with a flannel over it, and holding a hat, telling April that he was wearing it the first time he heard Vitalogy by Pearl Jam when he realizes she is selling it. Ann also mentions that she has a tendency to adopt the personality of the person she is dating, and Andy was her grunge phase.

== Reception ==
This episode was critically acclaimed. Steve Heisler of The A.V. Club praised it, giving the episode an A. He particularly enjoyed the proposal scene, calling it "deceptively beautiful and elegant". Matt Fowler of IGN said, "This was a stellar episode, wonderfully balanced with heart and humor". Alan Sepinwall of HitFix called it a "very sweet, very funny episode", particularly mentioning the "beautiful climactic scene — another killer emotional moment from Amy Poehler".
