= How a Bill Becomes a Law =

- Parks and Recreation episode
- Episode no.: Season 5 Episode 3
- Directed by: Ken Whittingham
- Written by: Daniel J. Goor
- Original air date: October 4, 2012

Guest appearances
- Jon Glaser as Jeremy Jamm; Lucy Lawless as Diane Lewis

Episode chronology
| ← Previous "Soda Tax" | Next → "Sex Education" |
- Parks and Recreation season 5

"How a Bill Becomes a Law" is the third episode of the fifth season of the American comedy television series Parks and Recreation, and the 71st overall episode of the series. It originally aired on NBC in the United States on October 4, 2012.

In the episode, Leslie (Amy Poehler) scrambles to pass a bill that she proposed, while Ron (Nick Offerman) meets a potential love interest named Diane (Lucy Lawless). In Washington, D.C., Ben (Adam Scott) and April (Aubrey Plaza) decide to make an impromptu road trip to Pawnee.

== Plot ==
Leslie is given a large city council office. It comes with her own private bathroom, which Councilman Jeremy Jamm (who thinks the bathroom shouldn't be private) dislikes. Public opinion of the city council is low due to their inability to pass many laws, but Leslie tells local talk show "Pawnee Today" that an act to extend pool hours for a children's swim club is due to easily pass.

Inspired by his therapist's helpfulness, Chris starts a prototype 3-1-1 service and asks the parks department to answer calls. A woman named Diane repeatedly calls Ron's line about a pothole in front of her house; Ron decides to fill the pothole himself with Andy.

When Tom reveals that the bill no longer has the votes to pass, Leslie begs the elderly and racist Councilman Milton for his vote. He agrees to vote "yes", but when Leslie dodges his attempt to kiss her, he falls and injures himself, angering him back to a "no" vote. Jamm tells Leslie that he will vote "yes" if she switches offices with him, but she refuses. Meanwhile, Andy suggests to Ron that he play with Diane's two daughters to impress her; Diane later shows up at city hall and asks Ron out on a date.

Desperate for her bill to pass, a stressed Leslie gives up her office to Jamm, who also demands her parking spot. She allows it, passing the bill into law. At a later poolside press conference about the law, Jamm is intending to tell reporters about their secret deal. Before he can, an angry Tom pushes Jamm into the pool. To save face to the press, Leslie and Tom both jump in right after, acting as if it was a staged stunt.

In another subplot, Ben and April decide to make a surprise trip to Pawnee. However, they are unable to get out of the parking garage due to the presidential motorcade being nearby and security not letting any cars near the area. Ben and April remain in the car for hours and grow increasingly annoyed with each other. When the motorcade finally departs the area, Ben's car runs out of gas. They push it back into the parking spot and end up laughing about the experience, with Ben offering to pay for plane tickets to Pawnee the next weekend.

== Production ==
"How a Bill Becomes a Law" was written by Daniel J. Goor and directed by Ken Whittingham. Within a week of the episode's original broadcast, three deleted scenes were placed on the official Parks and Recreation website. In the first, 30-second clip, Jerry and Chris discuss Jerry's accidental answering of 9-1-1 calls rather than 3-1-1, and the unexpected repercussions thereof. The second clip was 80 seconds long, and showed April and Ben's attempts to entertain themselves while stuck in the car, including playing games, taking a nap, and talking about Leslie, which leads April to claim that Leslie loves Ann more than Ben. In the third clip, which was 100 seconds long, three short scenes are combined: Leslie discussing her choice to get a perm; Leslie's attempts to change Milton's vote; and Leslie wearing the Invisalign teeth Jamm had demanded she buy.

NBC also produced a photo gallery of the women Leslie has photos of in her office. These twelve real historical figures are mostly politicians, of both conservative and liberal parties, and several had been specifically mentioned on previous episodes. They include Hillary Clinton, Sally Ride, Madeleine Albright, and Olympia Snowe (who had appeared in the episode "Ms. Knope Goes to Washington").

== Cultural references ==
The title of the episode is a reference to the well-known Schoolhouse Rock! segment, "I'm Just a Bill", in which an anthropomorphic bill goes through various trials and tribulations while attempting to become a law.

The episode mentions the soundtracks of Pulp Fiction and Singles when April is looking through Ben's CDs when they are stuck in the car.

The episode also reveals that Ben writes Star Trek: The Next Generation fanfiction.
