= The Greatest Event in Television History =

Television series directed by Lance Bangs and Adam Scott

- Genre: Mockumentary
- Created by: Adam Scott; Naomi Scott
- Directed by: Lance Bangs; Adam Scott
- Presented by: Jeff Probst
- Starring: Adam Scott; Paul Scheer; Jon Schroeder
- Narrated by: Amanda Anka (Opening)
- Country of origin: United States
- Original language: English
- No. of episodes: 4

Production
- Executive producers: Adam Scott; Naomi Scott; Paul Scheer; Hend Baghdady (Ep. 1 only)
- Cinematography: Lance Bangs
- Editors: Jeff Buchanan (Eps. 1–2 & 4); Daniel Gray Longino (Eps, 2–3)
- Running time: 11–18 minutes
- Production companies: Electric Soup Productions (Episodes 2–4); Gettin' Rad; Williams Street

Original release
- Network: Adult Swim
- Release: October 12, 2012 – January 23, 2014

The Greatest Event in Television History is a mockumentary TV special series created by Adam Scott and Naomi Scott. The series premiered on Cartoon Network's late-night programming block Adult Swim on October 12, 2012, and ended on January 23, 2014, with a total of four episodes. Each episode originally aired independently as a "special presentation", several months apart.

== Format ==
The format of each special is a brief mockumentary about the shot-for-shot remake of a 1980s TV series opening credits sequence, followed by the remake itself. Series co-creator Adam Scott says the specials are at least in part motivated by his own memories of watching 1980s TV as a kid. Each episode is hosted by Jeff Probst with actors portraying fictional versions of themselves or others. After each episode, the original opening credit scene is shown.

== Production ==
Four episodes were produced during the show's run; the series finale aired on January 23, 2014. In an interview with Splitsider, Scott explained the conclusion of the series: "It's a lot of work for such a short, stupid thing... they're really fun and they're fun to make, but we're ready to move on."

== Cast ==
- Amanda Anka as voiceover (voice)
- Jeff Probst as himself
- Jon Hamm as Rick Simon
- Adam Scott as A.J. Simon / Jonathan Hart / Monroe Ficus / Henry Desmond
- Paul Rudd as Director / Kip Wilson
- Gus Van Sant as himself
- Joe Schroeder as Tallest Doctor
- Kathryn Hahn as Gretta Strauss / Sara Rush
- Paul Scheer as Protester
- Megan Mullally as Cecilia Simon
- Bailey as Marlowe
- Amy Poehler as Jennifer Hart
- Paul Rust as Director
- Horatio Sanz as Max
- Maya Ferrara as Basecamp PA
- David Wain as Bell Taint
- Nick Kroll as Jeremy Bay
- Catherine O'Hara as Muriel Rush
- Jon Glaser as Henry Rush
- Chelsea Peretti as Jackie Rush
- Jason Mantzoukas as Director
- Seth Morris as Channon Flowers
- Damian Lang as Emergency Medic
- Gillian Jacobs as Sonny Lumet
- Mo Collins as Ruth Dunbar
- Aisha Muharrar as Isabelle Hammond
- Helen Slayton-Hughes as Lilly Sinclair
- Aidy Bryant as Amy Cassidy

== Episodes ==
No.	Title	Original release date	U.S. viewers (millions)
1	"Simon & Simon"	October 12, 2012	1.673
Adam Scott and Jon Hamm reenact the opening sequence from Simon & Simon.
2	"Hart to Hart"	June 6, 2013	1.43
Adam Scott, Amy Poehler, and Horatio Sanz reenact the opening sequence from Hart to Hart.
3	"Too Close for Comfort"	November 7, 2013	1.420
Adam Scott, Catherine O'Hara, Chelsea Peretti, Kathryn Hahn, Jon Glaser and Jason Mantzoukas reenact the opening sequence from Too Close for Comfort.
4	"Bosom Buddies"	January 23, 2014	1.546
Adam Scott, Paul Rudd, Gillian Jacobs, Mo Collins, Aisha Muharrar, Helen Slayton-Hughes, and Aidy Bryant reenact the opening sequence from Bosom Buddies. Cameos by Peter Scolari, Tom Hanks, Jack Dylan Grazer, and Billy Joel, who actually performed "My Life", which he wrote and originally recorded but was covered by another artist for the original series. June Diane Raphael plays Adam's fictional wife Emily Scott.
