= Soda Tax (Parks and Recreation) =

- Parks and Recreation episode
- Episode no.: Season 5 Episode 2
- Directed by: Kyle Newacheck
- Written by: Norm Hiscock
- Original air date: September 27, 2012

Guest appearances
- Helen Slayton-Hughes as Ethel Beavers; Mary Faber as Kathryn Pinewood; Kevin Symons as Bill Dexhart

Episode chronology
← Previous "Ms. Knope Goes to Washington"	Next → "How a Bill Becomes a Law"
- Parks and Recreation season 5

"Soda Tax" is the second episode of the fifth season of the American comedy television series Parks and Recreation, and the 70th overall episode of the series. It originally aired on NBC in the United States on September 27, 2012.

In the episode, Leslie (Amy Poehler) faces obstacles while trying to pass a soda tax, while Andy (Chris Pratt) trains for his upcoming police physical examination. In Washington, D.C., Ben (Adam Scott) tries to connect with his interns.

== Plot ==
Leslie has proposed a soda tax on restaurants in an effort to curb Pawnee's obesity problem. While Ann loves the idea, Ron, as a staunch libertarian, feels it is government overreach. Leslie meets with Kathryn Pinewood of the Pawnee Restaurant Association, displaying the enormous cups available for cheap soda; Kathryn warns she will claim the tax will force restaurants to lay off workers, turning Pawnee residents against the proposal. Meanwhile, in Washington, D.C., Ben is prepared to fire his lazy interns, especially after one posts an unflattering drawing of him in the office, but instead decides to be overly friendly to them after learning that they are all related to, or have social ties to, powerful political figures.

Chris and Tom help Andy train for the police department's physical examination, but he struggles to run the required two miles in under 25 minutes. Chris asks Andy to think about what motivates him; Andy thinks of his love for April and is able to finish the two mile run in time. However, Chris realizes that he himself has no reason to exercise since he has no one to love, and he collapses from sadness. Tom later suggests that Chris see a therapist, and Chris is very receptive to the idea.

At a public forum about the soda tax, Leslie panics when an angry restaurant employee demands a recall election against Leslie if he loses his job. Leslie becomes so nervous during the council vote on the tax that she binges on cheap soda and vomits, buying her more time to think it over. Ben, meanwhile, is angered when another drawing of him is posted in the office, and discovers that April is the one responsible. Upset by April's behavior and refusal to take her work seriously, Ben angrily upbraids her for having no professionalism, and says he invited her to work with him on the campaign because she's smart and talented. Mollified, April later threatens the most obnoxious of the interns, Ellis, and scares him into doing his assigned tasks, as Ben looks on and smiles.

Leslie asks Ron for advice, and Ron reveals that he tried to fire Leslie many times in the past because of her unrelentingly upbeat attitude; he always withdrew the termination, because he was ultimately impressed by her determination, whereas others would simply change to please their boss. Inspired by Ron's (begrudging) appreciation for her convictions, Leslie goes back to the council chambers and casts the vote that passes the tax by a 3–2 margin.

== Production ==
"Soda Tax" was written by Norm Hiscock and directed by Kyle Newacheck. Within a week of the episode's original broadcast, three deleted scenes were placed on the official Parks and Recreation website. The first, 90-second clip, is an extended version of Ben's attempts to ingratiate himself with his interns, featuring several short scenes. The second clip was only 60 seconds long, and expanded on Tom's use and redecoration of Pawnee's official golf cart. In the third clip, also 60 seconds long, Leslie and Ann discuss what to do about the proposed tax, and compare Leslie's previous record in the Parks Department to George Clooney's career. They ultimately decide to hold a public forum.

NBC also produced a photo gallery of fourteen accessories Tom added to the golf cart, including unnecessary items such as a wine fridge, a shrimp cocktail fork, and a ceiling mirror.

== Reception ==
While admitting it wasn't "a great episode," Emily St. James of The A.V. Club notes that it is "exactly the kind of thing I want when I tune into Parks & Rec." Amy Watts of The Baltimore Sun cited Ann's giant sugar box as the "Prop of the night."

== Cultural references ==
The episode refers to the proposed limit on the sale of soft drinks in venues, restaurants and sidewalk carts to 16 ounces, a plan put forward by Michael Bloomberg, then Mayor of New York City.
