= Helen Slayton-Hughes =

American actress (1930–2022)

- Born: October 30, 1930; Glen Ridge, New Jersey, U.S.
- Died: December 7, 2022 (aged 92)
- Occupation: Actress
- Years active: 1980–2022

Helen Slayton-Hughes (née Slayton; October 30, 1930 – December 7, 2022) was an American actress who was best known for playing Ethel Beavers in Parks and Recreation, and appeared in over 200 stage and television roles.

== Personal life ==
Helen Slayton was born in 1930, the third of 4 children of Ralph Emil Slayton and Helen (née Peer) Slayton. Slayton-Hughes was married and had four children and six grandchildren.

Slayton-Hughes died in her sleep on December 7, 2022, at age 92. Her death was publicly announced by her family on Thursday, December 8, 2022, via Facebook. Her funeral was held on January 21, 2023 at St. Thomas the Apostle Episcopal Church, Hollywood.

== Filmography ==
=== Film ===
Year	Title	Role	Notes
1980	Mafia on the Bounty	Selma	
1982	Shoot the Moon	Singer	
2003	Gossip	Sophie	Short film
2005	Good Night, and Good Luck	Mary	
2006	I Want Someone to Eat Cheese With	Mrs. Moskowitz	
2006	Being the Tooth Fairy	Tooth Fairy	Short film
2008	The Onion Movie	'Yarn-it-All' Employee	
2008	A Pig's Ear		Short film
2010	Crazy on the Outside	Grandma	
2010	Hesher	Mrs. Rosowski	
2010	Lesbian Homecoming	Feminist Book Club Member	Short film
2014	Veronica Mars	Mrs. Barnes	
2015	Homage to Erik Satie's Laundress	Laundress/Narrator	Short film
2016	The Gift of the Magpie	Mavis Turner	Short film
2017	CASH	Mrs. Patterson	Short film
2018	Don't Worry, He Won't Get Far on Foot	Woman on Bus	
2018	The Invisible Mother	Mona	
2019	Klaus	—N/a	Additional voices
2019	I Am Evelyn Rose	Jan	Short film
2021	Moxie	Helen	
2022	The Curse of Bridge Hollow	Victoria	
2022	Being Mortal		Abandoned film

=== Television ===
Year	Title	Role	Notes
1981	The Princess and the Cabbie	Valerie Bertinelli's BART Nemesis	Television film
2000	Nash Bridges	Gertrude Jorgensen	Episodes: "Jump Start", "Rock and a Hard Place"
2001–2002	Power Rangers Time Force	Elderly Lady	Episodes: "Frax's Fury", "Dawn of Destiny"
2001	The Drew Carey Show	Eighty-Year-Old Woman	Episode: Drew Carey's Back-to-School Rock 'n' Roll Comedy Hour
2001	Judging Amy	Coffee Shop Patron	Episode: "Crime and Puzzlement"
2003	The West Wing	Marion Cotesworth-Haye	Episode: "Privateers"
2003	Carnivàle	Scripture-Reading Lady	Episode: "Milfay"
2003	NYPD Blue	Grace Langford	Episode: "Frickin' Fraker"
2003–2004	Malcolm in the Middle	Nana/Elderly Woman	Episodes: "Malcom Dates a Family", "Stereo Store"
2004	One on One	Carol	Episode: "Sleepless in Baltimore"
2004–2005	That's So Raven	Mildred	Episodes: "My Big Fat Pizza Party", "Dog Day After-Groom"
2006	Arrested Development	Mrs. Van Skoyk	Episode: "S.O.B.s"
2006	Four Kings	Helen	Episode: "Upper West Side Story"
2007	My Name is Earl	Mrs. Abernathy	Episode: "Buried Treasure"
2007	Out of Jimmy's Head	Doris	Episode: "Detention"
2007	The Minister of Divine	Dorothy Vanderbosch	Television film
2008	Desperate Housewives	Elderly Woman	Episode: "The Gun Song"
2010	Pretty Little Liars	Mrs. Potter	Episode: "Keep Your Friends Close"
2011–2015	Parks and Recreation	Ethel Beavers	11 episodes
2012	Raising Hope	Harriett	Episode: "Throw Maw Maw from the House (Part II)"
2012–2013	Burning Love	Virginia/Agnes	21 episodes
2013	True Blood	Caroline Bellefleur	Episodes: "Life Matters", "Dead Meet"
2013	Brooklyn Nine-Nine	Ethel Musterberg	Episode: "The Slump"
2013	Parenthood	Edie	Episode: "Election Day"
2013	Getting On	Sandy Sayles	Episode: "Born on the Fourth of July"
2014	Men at Work	Edith	Episode: "Pre-Posal"
2014	The Greatest Event in Television History	Lilly	Episode: "Bosom Buddies"
2014	The Night Shift	Wendy Franklin	Episode: "Second Chances"
2014	The Birthday Boys	Helen Ainsley	Episode: "Wet Dreams May Come"
2014–2015	New Girl	Mrs. Raws	Episodes: "Coming Out", "Landline"
2015	Kroll Show	Doris	Episode: "Body Bouncers"
2017	The Middle	Eleanor	Episode: "Swing and a Miss"
2018	Little Big Awesome	Penelope Pitt-Plebop/Townsfolk	Episodes: "Snow Day/Rootin' For Change", "Puppy Shower/Claude the Buff Hamster"
2018	Fresh off the Boat	Dot	Episode: "Where Have All the Cattlemen Gone?"
2019	Those Who Can't	Agnes Butterpanny	Episode: "Those Who Could've"
2019	Single Parents	Diana	Episode: "Big Widow Wives"

=== Video games ===
Year	Title	Role	Notes
2012	Guild Wars 2	Shriika/Zena Zonwoman	
2014	Murdered: Soul Suspect	Several (voices)	

== Other Activities ==
Hughes was a songwriter and playwright who joined the BMI Music Theater Writers workshops in 1994. She wrote many novelty songs and wrote books, lyrics, and sometimes music for various projects inspired by the work of George Bernard Shaw (Androcles and the Lion) and Gene Stratton Porter (Girl of the Limberlost).
