= Galentine's Day =

Galentine's Day may refer to:

- Galentine's Day (observance), holiday that celebrates women's friendship
- Galentine's Day (2010 Parks and Recreation episode), the 2010 TV episode that started the observance of the holiday
- Galentine's Day (2014 Parks and Recreation episode), the 2014 TV episode that used the observance of the holiday
