= End of the World (Parks and Recreation) =

- Parks and Recreation episode
- Episode no.: Season 4 Episode 6
- Directed by: Dean Holland
- Written by: Michael Schur
- Original air date: November 3, 2011

Episode chronology
← Previous "Meet n Greet"	Next → "The Treaty"
- Parks and Recreation season 4

"End of the World" is the sixth episode of the fourth season of the NBC sitcom Parks and Recreation and the 52nd episode overall. It originally aired in the United States on November 3, 2011. "End of the World" was written by Michael Schur and was directed by Dean Holland. The episode features a doomsday cult, the Reasonabilists (also known derogatorily as "Zorpies"), who predict that the world is coming to an end.

== Plot ==
A local Pawnee group, the Reasonabilists (a.k.a. "Zorpies"), members of a doomsday cult who follow "Zorp the Surveyor", predict that the end of the world is coming. Since they have been wrong in predicting the world's end in the past, they are not taken seriously, and Leslie Knope lets them hold an all-night vigil in the park, which has become a Pawnee tradition. Chris Traeger asks Leslie and Ben Wyatt to join him in monitoring the Reasonabilists during their vigil, which makes the two feel uncomfortable due to their recent break-up. As a precaution to the world's supposed demise, April Ludgate decides to help Andy Dwyer check off everything on his bucket list before the end of the day. Meanwhile, Entertainment 720, a company created by Tom Haverford and Jean-Ralphio Saperstein, is nearing its end. The two decide to spend their last amount of money to hold an “end of the world” party in their office space since the lease is not up until the following day.

Newspaper reporter Shauna Malwae-Tweep shows a romantic interest in Ben after interviewing Chris, Ben, and Leslie about the vigil at the park. Leslie panics and attempts to dissuade Shauna from pursuing Ben. Later, Shauna flirts with Ben and asks him to join her at the “end of the world” party. Tom is pleasantly surprised to find his ex-girlfriend Lucy at the party, whom Jean-Ralphio invited, though he wanted to hook up with her, forgetting that Tom and she had ever dated.

When Ben prepares to meet with Shauna at Entertainment 720, Leslie panics and persuades him to join her in seeing an interesting Pawnee site. Instead, she drives the two in circles, ending up at an abandoned gas station. Ben realizes Leslie's plan and expresses his disapproval of her attempts to interfere with his personal life, noting that the break-up was on her terms. Later, Leslie admits to Ron that she would want to spend her last night with Ben if the world was ending. Ron reminds Leslie that the world is not ending, so she must accept her decision to prioritize her political career over Ben. Meanwhile, April and Andy have completed Andy's bucket list, only missing seeing the Grand Canyon. They steal April's father's car and begin driving to Arizona.

The world does not end, as expected, and Entertainment 720's party is a huge success. Lucy congratulates Tom the next morning, and Leslie apologizes to Ben and lets him know that she will no longer interfere with his dating. April and Andy arrive at the Grand Canyon, but when Andy asks where the presidents' faces are, April realizes he was actually thinking of Mount Rushmore.

== Reception ==
=== Ratings ===
In its original American broadcast, "End of the World" was seen by nearly 4 million household viewers, according to Nielsen Media Research, with an overall 2.0 rating among adults between ages 18 and 49. The episode garnered 3.94 million views.

=== Reviews ===
The episode received generally positive reviews. Matt Fowler of IGN said that the episode "did a perfect job of showing us how genuine sentiment can blossom from the seeds of hysteria and stupidity". Steve Heisler of The A.V. Club gave "End of the World" a B+, saying that the "structure and pacing was spot-on. But the episode didn't sit as neatly with me while I was watching. In short, it's because of the Leslie Knope problem I thought the show was done with by now."
