= Ms. Knope Goes to Washington =

- Parks and Recreation episode
- Episode no.: Season 5 Episode 1
- Directed by: Dean Holland
- Written by: Aisha Muharrar
- Original air date: September 20, 2012

Guest appearances
- Barbara Boxer as herself; Olympia Snowe as herself; John McCain as himself

Episode chronology
← Previous "Win, Lose, or Draw"	Next → "Soda Tax"
- Parks and Recreation season 5

"Ms. Knope Goes to Washington" is the season premiere of the fifth season of the American comedy television series Parks and Recreation, and the 69th overall episode of the series. It originally aired on NBC in the United States on September 20, 2012.

In the episode, Leslie (Amy Poehler) and Andy (Chris Pratt) visit Ben (Adam Scott) and April (Aubrey Plaza) in Washington, D.C., while Ron (Nick Offerman) attempts to organize a barbecue for the staff.

== Plot ==
Leslie and Andy are visiting Washington, D.C., to see Ben, who accepted a temporary job there for a congressional re-election campaign, and April, who decided to join Ben as his intern. Leslie is thrilled to be in the capital and also hopes to secure federal funding to clean the Pawnee River, but her optimism is dulled when she is unable to meet with anyone at the United States Department of the Interior, resulting in her proposal being tossed into a giant pile with numerous other unread proposals.

In Pawnee, Ron says that with Leslie absent, he will take over the "Leslie Knope Employment Enjoyment Summer Slam Grill Jam Fun-Splosion", an annual barbecue for the Parks department but plans to make it just about meat with no other types of food or even activities. Tom and Ann have long since broken up but pretend to still be a couple and even live together just so they don't have to endure teasing at work (and Tom does not want to lose a bet about how long the relationship will last to Donna). Ann finds the ruse difficult because of Tom's stupidity.

Ben invites Leslie to a cocktail party, but she is intimidated by the numerous beautiful and powerful women whom Ben must work with every day and feels that her being elected to city council is feeble compared to their positions of power. Leslie feels so inferior that she barely reacts when meeting two of her idols, Senators Barbara Boxer and Olympia Snowe. She sulks in the coatroom and rebuffs words of comfort from a concerned man. (John McCain).

Ron brings a pig named Tom that he will slaughter and cook to the park but is informed that it violates numerous laws. Annoyed, Ron instead buys pounds of meat which will take several hours to cook. Chris notices the frustration of the Parks department and repeatedly gives Ron suggestions to improve the barbecue, but the stubborn Ron ignores him. Ron angrily then drives off with the barbecue. The next day, Chris confronts Ron as a boss, explaining that the barbecue is meant to boost morale and show appreciation for the staff. Ron finally accepts Chris' advice and throws a small barbecue in the office for the staff, even adding corn to the mix.

Donna sees Ann and Tom fighting and reveals that she knew they were not actually together allowing them to finally drop the ruse. Back in Pawnee, Leslie complains to Andy about how insignificant she feels, her worries that Ben will fall for one of the female lobbyists in DC, and how her proposal will be forgotten. Andy reassures her and a rejuvenated Leslie later holds a press conference declaring that she will spend time every weekend cleaning the Pawnee River herself, during which time she would be accessible to the citizens of Pawnee. She and Ben later Skype with each other, which removes any worries she had about their relationship.

== Production ==
"Ms. Knope Goes to Washington" was written by Aisha Muharrar and directed by Dean Holland.

== Release ==
After the episode's release, several deleted scenes were uploaded to NBC.com. As well as three other clips, labeled "Extra Bits", centering Andy.

=== Critical reception ===
"Ms. Knope Goes to Washington" received generally positive reviews. The A.V. Club writer Steve Heisler gave the episode an A−, saying, "how awesome is this show that it’s transformed before our very eyes so slowly that it seems totally natural? To me, that’s the essence of great TV writing: It takes bold steps, but makes total sense in hindsight". He particularly cited Leslie's emotional breakdown and the friendship between Ron and Chris. Alan Sepinwall of HitFix praised the use of the location scenes in Washington, D.C., as well as the split of Ann and Tom as a romantic couple. Matt Fowler of IGN gave the episode a score of 9.0, saying the series "continues its run of being infinitely quotable while having some of the funniest and sweetest characters on TV". He emphasized the role of the character Andy in this episode and the series generally for being "incredibly key to the comedy".
