= Sex Education (Parks and Recreation) =

- Parks and Recreation episode
- Episode no.: Season 5 Episode 4
- Directed by: Craig Zisk
- Written by: Alan Yang
- Original air date: October 18, 2012

Guest appearances
- Adam J. Harrington as Congressman David Murray; Darlene Hunt as Marcia Langman; Jay Jackson as Perd Hapley

Episode chronology
← Previous "How a Bill Becomes a Law"	Next → "Halloween Surprise"
- Parks and Recreation season 5

"Sex Education" is the fourth episode of the fifth season of the American comedy television series Parks and Recreation, and the 72nd overall episode of the series. It originally aired on NBC in the United States on October 18, 2012.

In the episode, Leslie (Amy Poehler) fights against Pawnee's abstinence-only sex education platform, Tom (Aziz Ansari) struggles to live without technology, and Ben (Adam Scott) and April (Aubrey Plaza) finally meet the Congressman they are working for.

== Plot ==
Leslie has organized a sexual education seminar, as sexually transmitted diseases are rampant among Pawnee's senior citizens. Ann is asked to help out due to her medical background. After getting into a car accident due to constant use of his smartphone, Tom is taken to court and sentenced to one week without looking at a screen. Tom finds life without technology very difficult, so Ron decides to take Tom to his cabin in the woods so he can "detox" from his technology addiction.

Leslie's seminar is stopped by Marcia Langman of the conservative Society for Family Stability Foundation, and Marcia's strongly hinted to be closeted gay husband, Marshall Langman, claiming the seminar is against the law. Chris reveals Pawnee's law that abstinence-only sex education must be applied citywide, so the seminar is shut down. Leslie refuses to put up a vote to change the law due to overwhelming public support for it. At the next seminar, Leslie finds herself unable to force the abstinence view on the seniors, deciding to toss condoms into the audience. As a result, she is formally censured by Mayor Gunderson. Anticipating further punishment from Chris, Leslie is surprised when he says that she is technically his boss.

In the wilderness, Tom takes an entire day divulging to Ron everything he does with technology. Claiming he is going to buy steaks, Tom drives Ron's car to get a new phone, only to become distracted by it and crash the car into a tree. Tom later admits that his own personal life isn't going well, and he feels the need to be distracted from it by technology. Ron gives Tom an auto manual to read so Tom can help fix Ron's car. Perd Hapley interviews Leslie about the censure, where she refuses to apologize and vows to work hard to change the abstinence-only law, despite the public backlash she will receive.

In another subplot, Ben and April meet Congressman David Murray, whose reelection campaign they are working on. April is disturbed by Murray's almost robotic-like manner and becomes convinced he may actually be a robot. Even Ben becomes put off by Murray's complete lack of personality, rampant use of generic friendly chat, and non-offensive political talk. Ben later watches in befuddlement as Murray does everything his handlers tell him without a hint of having thoughts of his own, which makes him beloved by his advisors as the perfect political candidate.

== Production ==
"Sex Education" was written by Alan Yang and directed by Craig Zisk. Within a week of the episode's original broadcast, four deleted scenes were placed on the official Parks and Recreation website. The first, 100-second clip, expands on the subplot between Tom and Ron, particularly Tom's overuse of sites such as Instagram and Reddit. The second clip was 80 seconds long, and is composed of several short scenes of Leslie's sex education program and her tension with the Langmans. In the third clip, which was 60 seconds long, Ben conducts a meeting with Congressman Murray and his handlers, while April attempts to determine if Murray is a human or a robot. The fourth, 50-second, clip showed Leslie and Ann practicing the use of a lasso, and hog-tying Jerry.

NBC also produced two photo galleries for the episode. The first, titled "April's Robot Detection Tips", is a series of fourteen photos of robots, paired with advice such as "Wait to see if they die. Robots don't die". The second gallery is called "Tom's Take on Emojis". During the episode, Tom had discussed his use of Emoji, small images that can be sent in text messages. The gallery includes images of twelve emojis, along with in-character description of how Tom interprets their meanings.
