= Greg Pikitis =

- Parks and Recreation episode
- Episode no.: Season 2 Episode 7
- Directed by: Dean Holland
- Written by: Michael Schur
- Original air date: October 29, 2009

Guest appearances
- Louis C.K. as Dave Sanderson; Kathleen M. Darcy as Evelyn; Josh Duvendeck as Ben; Cody Klop as Greg Pikitis; Blake Lee as Derek; Jim O'Heir as Jerry Gergich; Nicole Pettis as Paula; Cooper Thornton as Dr. Harris; Jama Williamson as Wendy Haverford

Episode chronology
← Previous "Kaboom"	Next → "Ron and Tammy"
- Parks and Recreation season 2

"Greg Pikitis" is the seventh episode of the second season of Parks and Recreation, and the thirteenth overall episode of the series. It originally aired on NBC in the United States on October 29, 2009. In the episode, Leslie attempts to catch a suspected teenage vandal in the act of defacing a public statue. Meanwhile, Ann throws a Halloween party, which turns out to be very boring until Tom livens it up.

The episode was written by series co-founder Michael Schur and directed by Dean Holland, an editor on the series. "Greg Pikitis" featured a guest performance by stand-up comedian Louis C.K. as Dave Sanderson, Leslie's police officer boyfriend. It also featured Cody Klop as Greg Pikitis, a teenager whom Leslie considers her nemesis.

According to Nielsen Media Research, "Greg Pikitis" was seen by 4.96 million household viewers, only a slight drop from the previous week despite direct competition from the 2009 World Series. The episode received generally positive reviews.

== Plot ==
Leslie visits the Pawnee high school to confront Greg Pikitis, a teenager who she describes as her "arch-nemesis". Leslie warns Greg she knows he vandalizes the town's statue of Mayor Percy every Halloween, but that she will be watching him closely and will catch him this year. Greg casually denies having any such plans. At the Pawnee town hall, Ann talks excitedly about her upcoming Halloween party. She asks the others not to mention it to Tom, but she is disappointed to learn Jerry has already told him. That night, Leslie watches Greg with the help of her boyfriend, Pawnee police officer Dave Sanderson, while Andy, who now has a part-time job with the parks department, guards the statue.

Ann's party is off to a boring start and she soon begins to fear it will be a failure altogether. When Tom and his wife Wendy arrive, however, Tom spices up the party by turning the living room into a dance floor. The party is soon a big hit, and Ann thanks Tom profusely. Wendy tells Ron she knows Ron learned her marriage to Tom was a "green card marriage" to keep her from being deported to Canada, and thanks him for his discretion. She tells him they will soon be able to divorce without raising any suspicions, unaware that Tom is visibly upset about it.

After watching Greg for hours, Leslie and Dave decide to go to Ann's party. They stop at the parks department to get Leslie's costume, only to find the office has been toilet papered and vandalized. Leslie immediately suspects Greg, even though they had been watching him all night. Dave reluctantly agrees to bring Greg in for questioning, but Greg insists he is innocent. Andy comes in and questions Greg, pretending to be an FBI agent named Burt Macklin, but Greg is so mean to him Andy soon starts crying. Greg's mother eventually arrives and takes him away after threatening to report the trio for holding her son without proof of his guilt.

Later, Andy helps Leslie clean the parks office and, after a few beers, they decide to toilet paper Greg's house. Dave arrives in his police car and tells them he had been called to stop them. When an unfamiliar woman comes out of the house, Leslie thinks she has toilet papered the wrong house. However, the woman reveals she is Greg's actual mother, and that Greg hired a "fake mother" off of Craigslist to get him out of trouble. When she realizes Greg is not home, Leslie believes he is vandalizing the mayor statue. They go to the statue and catch Greg in the process; although Leslie wishes to have him "locked up," Dave points out he is still a minor and will likely only receive probation. Later, Leslie wonders how Greg managed to trash the parks department. The episode ends with a flashback showing Greg sneaking into the department disguised as a janitor, hiding in a dumpster until everybody leaves, then vandalizing the office.

== Production ==
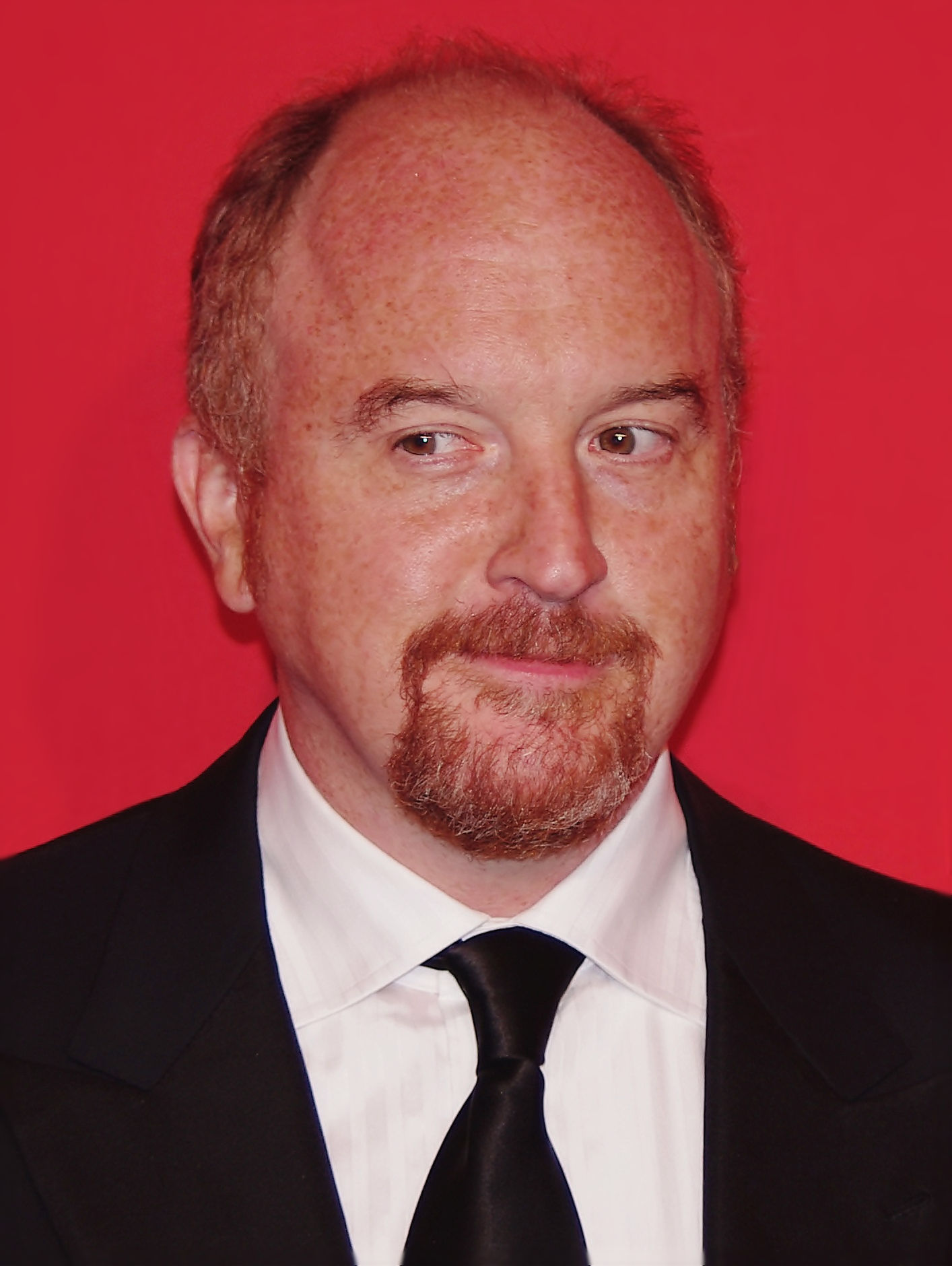
Stand-up comedian Louis C.K. guest starred as Officer Dave Sanderson in "Greg Pikitis".

"Greg Pikitis" was written by series co-creator Michael Schur and directed by Dean Holland, an editor on the series. Both Schur and Holland previously worked on the NBC series, The Office. The episode featured a guest performance by stand-up comedian Louis C.K., who reprises his recurring role as Dave Sanderson, Leslie's police officer boyfriend. It also featured Cody Klop as Greg Pikitis himself.

Within a week of the episode's original broadcast, two deleted scenes from "Greg Pikitis" were made available on the official Parks and Recreation website. In the first minute-long clip, Leslie broadcasts an impression of a police officer on Dave's police radio, which gets him into trouble. She also discusses the frequent use of torture by Jack Bauer, the protagonist of the Fox series 24, while she contemplates torturing Greg Pikitis. In the second 75-second clip, Jerry nearly passes out from dehydration in his oversized Halloween dragon costume, and Leslie arrives late to the party dressed as a nurse.

== Cultural references ==
For her Halloween party, Ann dressed like Raggedy Ann, the rag doll protagonist of a series of children's books written by Johnny Gruelle. Tom comes to the party dressed as T-Pain. Ann has a large amount of Almond Joy chocolate bars at her party. The 1962 song "Monster Mash" by Bobby Pickett is played in the background of the party. Pikitis hires an actress to play his fake mother using Craigslist. April says that during a previous gay Halloween party, she saw three Jonas Brothers making out with three Robert Pattinsons. Leslie refers to Greg as "an invisible, adolescent, James Bond super-villain criminal mastermind".

== Reception ==
In its original American broadcast on October 29, 2009, "Greg Pikitis" was seen by 4.96 million household viewers, according to Nielsen Media Research. It was only a slight drop from the previous week, despite direct competition from game two of the 2009 World Series on Fox. "Greg Pikitis" drew a 2.1 rating/5 share among viewers aged between 18 and 49. The episode received generally positive reviews. Many commentators said the awkward exchanges between Ron and Wendy at the Halloween party seemed to be hinting at a possible romance between the two in future episodes. Matt Fowler of IGN said "Greg Pikitis" was "probably the best conceived and most hilarious episode" of Parks and Recreation so far. Fowler said he liked the Leslie and Andy pairing, and he was relieved the show found something "meaty and meaningful" to do with the character. Fowler said Ann's party was less funny, but advanced many of the supporting characters.

Like The Office when it's clicking, Parks and Recreation this season works on two levels: it makes me laugh a lot, and it also makes me happy to spend time with these characters in their mundane but goofy little world.

— Alan Sepinwall, The Star-Ledger

Alan Sepinwall of The Star-Ledger declared "Greg Pikitis" one of the episodes he would suggest to newcomers seeking to become familiar with Parks and Recreation, calling it "the version of Parks and Recreation that I most enjoy: silly, but also intentionally small in scale". He particularly praised Louis CK and some of the smaller jokes in the episode, like the fact that a gay character's "straight guy" Halloween costume is identical to Mark's regular wardrobe. Steve Heisler of The A.V. Club said the episode "demonstrated how an episode of P&R can work wonders—dial up the conditions that might drive a character insane, as they did to Leslie, and watch them squirm". He also said the episode featured every supporting character well, but that Ann was less funny without a "wacky person to play off of". Time magazine critic James Poniewozik said it was a "strong episode that hit office and personal sides of the characters equally well". Poniewozik praised Pratt and Louis C.K. in particular, but also said Leslie was pushed "a little too far into the crazy-obsessive end of the spectrum". Not all reviews were positive. Linda Stasi of New York Post said the episode was "a big yawn", although she praised the performance of Cody Klop as Greg Pikitis.

During a brainstorming session among the Parks and Recreation writers prior to season four, screenwriter Chelsea Peretti proposed bringing the Greg Pikitis character back for a future episode. This finally happened in episode 18 of season six ("Prom").

== DVD release ==
"Greg Pikitis", along with the other 23 second season episodes of Parks and Recreation, was released on a four-disc DVD set in the United States on November 30, 2010. The DVD included deleted scenes for each episode.
