= Norm Hiscock =

Canadian screenwriter, producer and director

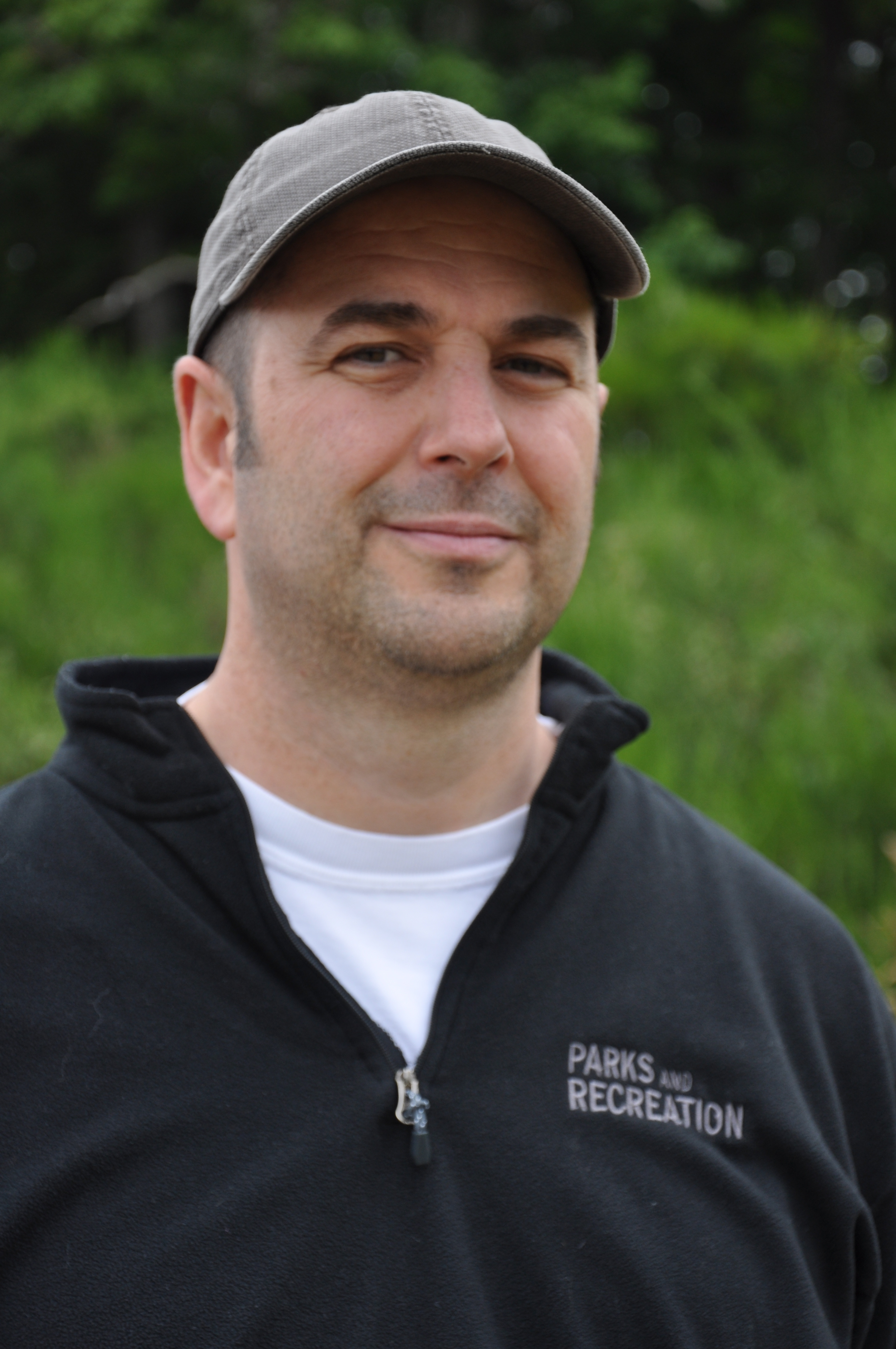
- Norm Hiscock
- Born: Montreal, Quebec, Canada
- Occupation: Television writer
- Writing career
- Genre: Comedy

Norm Hiscock is a Canadian screenwriter, producer and director. He is known for his work on Saturday Night Live, King of the Hill, The Kids in the Hall, Corner Gas, Parks and Recreation, Brooklyn Nine-Nine and most recently, an executive producer on People of Earth, Trailer Park Boys: The Animated Series, Space Force and King Of The Hill:Revival. He was also a writer on The Kids in the Hall film, Kids in the Hall: Brain Candy.

== King of the Hill written/co-written episodes ==
1. "Propane Boom"
2. "And They Call It Bobby Love"
3. "Peggy's Pageant Fever"
4. "As Old as the Hills"
5. "To Kill a Ladybird"
6. "Old Glory"
7. "The Buck Stops Here"
8. "Bobby Goes Nuts"
9. "The Bluegrass Is Always Greener"
10. "Dances with Dogs"
11. "Flirting with the Master"
12. "The Beer Story"
13. "Bobby Gets Grilled"
14. "Propane Recall"

== Parks and Recreation written/co-written episodes ==
1. "Rock Show"
2. "Pawnee Zoo"
3. "Woman of the Year"
4. "Flu Season"
5. "Jerry's Painting"
6. "Ron and Tammys"
7. "Sweet Sixteen"
8. "Soda Tax"
9. "Emergency Response"
10. "Jerry's Retirement"

== Brooklyn Nine-Nine written/co-written episodes ==
1. "The Tagger"
2. "Full Boyle"
3. "Pontiac Bandit"
4. "Payback"
