= Ken Whittingham =

American television director

- Education: California State University, Northridge: Bachelor of Arts in Journalism
- Occupation: Television director
- Years active: 1997–present

Ken Whittingham is an American television director.

Some of his directing credits include American Housewife, Gilmore Girls, Unbreakable Kimmy Schmidt, Ugly Betty, Still Standing, Community, Yes, Dear, 30 Rock, Californication, Parks and Recreation, The Middle, The Mindy Project, Parenthood, The Bernie Mac Show, Scrubs, 2 Broke Girls, Everybody Hates Chris, Modern Family, Bookie, The King of Queens, Rules of Engagement, The Office, My Name Is Earl, Entourage, Suburgatory (also a producer), Bless This Mess, Single Parents, American Housewife, Kenan, Dad Stop Embarrassing Me!, The Upshaws, The Wonder Years, Abbott Elementary and St. Denis Medical.

Whittingham has won five NAACP Image Awards for his work on The Office, 30 Rock and Parks and Recreation.
