= Aisha Muharrar =

American screenwriter (born 1984)

- Born: Aisha Muharrar; March 12, 1984 (age 42)
- Education: Harvard University (AB)
- Occupations: Television producer, screenwriter, author, actor
- Spouse: Ben Epstein (m. 2017)
- Children: 1
- Writing career
- Notable works: Parks and Recreation; The Good Place

Aisha Muharrar (born March 12, 1984) is an American television writer and author of the books More Than a Label, and Loved One.

== Early life ==
Muharrar graduated from Harvard University with a degree in English and American Literature and Language and was the Vice President of the Harvard Lampoon humor magazine. She is a native of Bay Shore, New York.

== Career ==
She was a writer for NBC's Parks and Recreation created by Greg Daniels and Michael Schur. Previously, she was a staff writer for Fox's animated comedy Sit Down, Shut Up, created by Mitch Hurwitz. She produced and wrote for Hacks from the second season until the fifth and final season.

== Filmography ==
=== Television ===
| Year | Title | Director | Writer | Story editor | Producer | Actor | Co-executive producer | Notes |
|---|---|---|---|---|---|---|---|---|
| 2009–2015 | Parks and Recreation | | Yes | Yes | Yes | Yes | Yes | Wrote 14 episodes; Story editor - 16 episodes (2011); Executive story editor - 22 episodes (2011 - 2012); Co-producer - 22 episodes (2012 - 2013); Producer - 22 episodes (2013 - 2014); Co-executive producer - 13 episodes (2015); Appeared as Kerp Sulsse in episode, "The Pawnee-Eagleton Tip Off Classic" |
| 2011 | Sit Down, Shut Up, | | Yes | | | | | Credited as term writer for 13 episodes |
| 2012 | LA'd | Yes | | | | | | Directed episode, "Doctor" |
| 2014 | The Greatest Event in Television History | | | | | Yes | | Appeared as Isabelle in episode, "Bosom Buddies" |
| 2016–2019 | The Good Place | | Yes | | | | Yes | Wrote 2 episodes; Co-executive producer - 13 episodes |
| 2022 | Hacks | | Yes | | | | Yes | Wrote 1 episode; Co-executive producer - 8 episodes |
