= Dean Holland =

American television director and producer

- Occupations: Film editor, television director, producer
- Years active: 1997–present

Dean Holland is an American film editor, television director and producer best known for working on Entourage and the comedy shows The Office and Parks and Recreation. In 2007, he was honored with the Primetime Emmy for Outstanding Single Camera Picture Editing for a Comedy Series for his work on The Office.

== Professional background ==
=== Editorial work ===
Holland's early work includes television documentaries such as Behind the Music and the 76th Academy Awards. In 2005, he edited the made-for-television sequel The Crow: Wicked Prayer. Since 2005, he has edited or co-edited more than 30 episodes of The Office and more than 15 episodes of Parks and Recreation since 2009.

=== Directorial work ===
The Office

- "The Duel" (5.12)
- "Costume Contest" (7.06)

Parks and Recreation

- "Greg Pikitis" (2.07)
- "Sweetums" (2.15)
- "The Master Plan" (2.23)
- "Go Big or Go Home" (3.01)
- "Harvest Festival" (3.07)
- "Li'l Sebastian" (3.16)
- "Born & Raised" (4.03)
- "End of the World" (4.03)
- "The Trial of Leslie Knope" (4.09)
- "Campaign Ad" (4.11)
- "Bus Tour" (4.21)
- "Ms. Knope Goes to Washington" (5.01)
- "Halloween Surprise" (5.05)
- "Two Parties" (5.10)
- "Emergency Response" (5.13)
- "Are You Better Off?" (5.22)
- "London" (6.01)
- "Second Chunce" (6.10)
- "Ann and Chris" (6.13)
- "New Slogan" (6.16)
- "One in 8,000" (6.20)
- "2017" (7.01)
- "Ron and Jammy" (7.02)
- "The Johnny Karate Super Awesome Musical Explosion Show" (7.10)

Breaking In

- "Chasing Molly and Andy" (2.09)

Brooklyn Nine-Nine

- "Halloween (1.06)
- "Undercover" (2.01)
- "Boyle-Linetti Wedding" (2.17)
- "Johnny and Dora" (2.23)
- "The Mattress" (3.07)
- "9 Days" (3.15)
- "The Overmining" (4.09)

Love

- "It Begins" (1.01)
- "One Day" (1.02)
- "The Table Read" (1.09)
- "The End of the Beginning" (1.10)
- "On Lockdown" (2.01)
- "Friends Night Out" (2.02)
- "Housesitting" (2.09)
- "Liberty Down" (2.10)

Trial & Error

- "The Case Gets Bigger" (1.07)

Ghosted

- "Whispers" (1.03)

Splitting Up Together

- "Pilot" (1.01)
- "Devil May Care" (1.02)
- "Street Meat" (1.03)
- "Nevertheless... She Went Clubbing" (1.05)
- "Heat Wave" (1.08)
- "Sign Language" (2.01)
- "We Need to Talk About Karen" (2.03)
- "Yes, Deer" (2.05)
- "Growing Pains" (2.06)
- "Paige Turner" (2.07)
- "Contact High" (2.09)
- "Everything's Okay" (2.13)
- “Welcome Home” (2.18)

The Good Place

- "...Someone Like Me as a Member" (1.09)
- "Mindy St. Claire" (1.12)
- "The Trolley Problem" (2.06)
- "Janet and Michael" (2.07)
- "The Burrito" (2.12)
- "Everything is Bonzer!" (3.01-02)
- "Don't Let The Good Life Pass You By" (3.09)

Bless This Mess

- "Scare Night" (1.05)
- "Bunker Night" (2.12)

The Unicorn

- "Turkeys and Traditions" (1.08)
- "If It Doesn't Spark Joy" (1.11)
- "Swerve and Volley" (2.07)
- "No Exit" (2.08)

Single Parents

- "A Place Where Men Can Be Men" (2.09)

Home Economics

- "Pilot" (1.01)
- "Mermaid Taffeta Wedding Dress, $1,999" (1.02)
- "49ers Foam Fingers, $7" (2.01)
- "Box of King-Size Candy Bars, $48.99" (2.06)
- "Poker Game, $800 Buy-In" (2.18)
- "Mango THC Gummies, $18" (2.20)
- "Melatonin 10 Mg Tablets, $14.99" (3.02)

Acapulco

- "Uptown Girl" (1.06)

Not Dead Yet

- "Pilot" (1.01)
- "Not Moving On Yet" (1.05)
- "Not Scattered Yet" (1.09)
- "Not Just Yet" (1.13)
- "Not Owning It Yet" (2.01)
- "Not a Valentine Yet" (2.02)
- "Not Solved Yet" (2.08)
- "Not a Ghost Yet" (2.10)
