= Fremulon =

American television production company

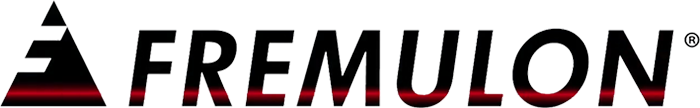
- Logo used since 2009
- Type: Private
- Industry: Television production
- Founded: April 2008; 18 years ago in Los Angeles, California, U.S.
- Founder: Michael Schur
- Headquarters: Los Angeles, California, United States
- Key people: Michael Schur (CEO)
- Owner: Michael Schur

Fremulon is an American television production company founded by television writer, producer, director, and actor Michael Schur in April 2008.

It is known for producing the television series Parks and Recreation, Brooklyn Nine-Nine, Master of None, The Good Place, and Hacks.

== History ==
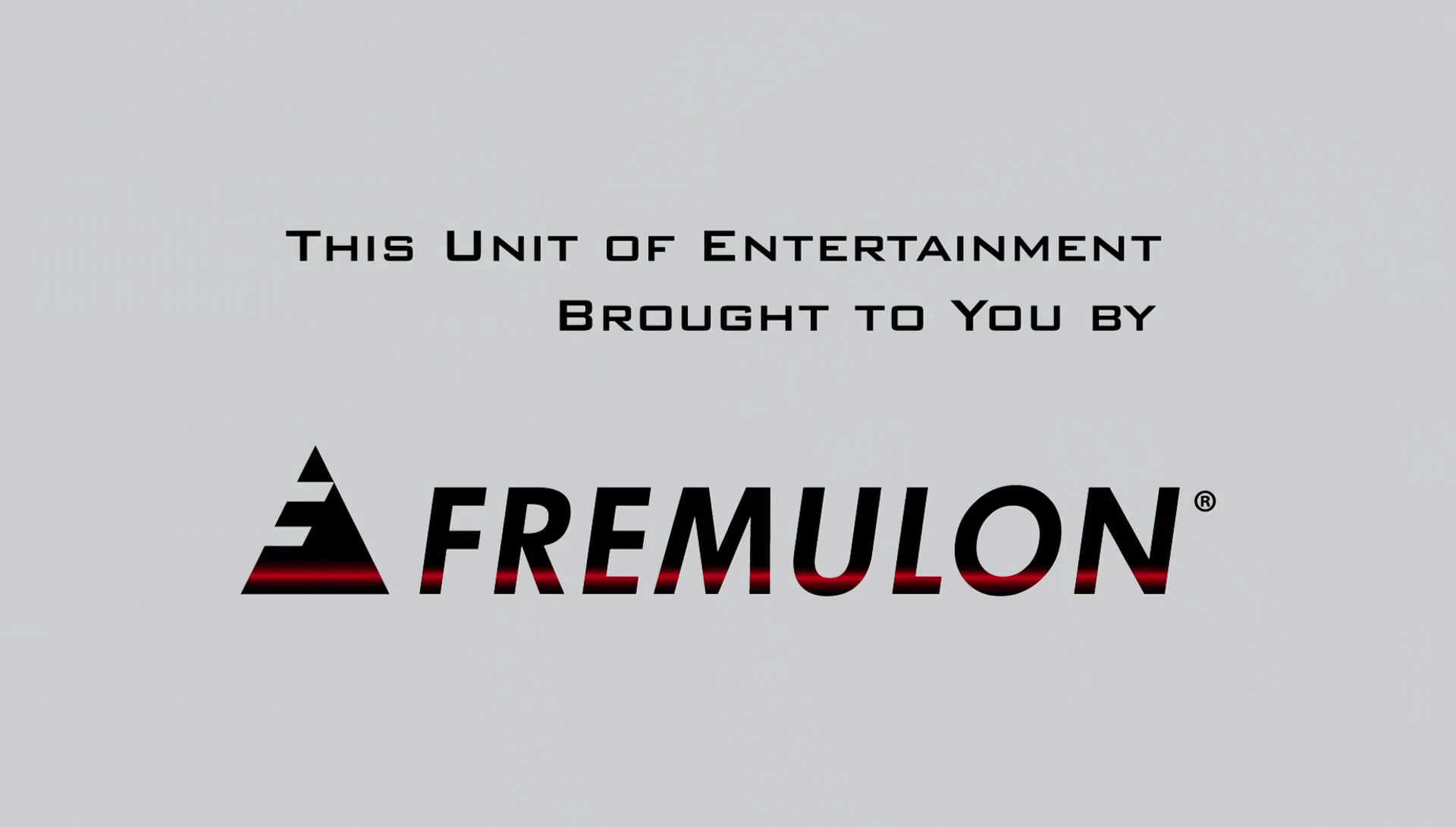
Fremulon's production logo, as seen on Brooklyn Nine-Nine

The company was founded in April 2008 by producer and writer Michael Schur. The name "Fremulon" comes from the fake insurance company that Schur's pseudonym, Ken Tremendous, worked at when he was writing for the sports blog Fire Joe Morgan, a near pun on the anatomical term frenulum. The production logo displayed at the end of Fremulon produced shows is accompanied by the word "Fremulon" spoken by actor Nick Offerman.

In March 2019, Fremulon renewed its overall deal at Universal Television.

== Filmography ==
=== Television ===
==== Current ====
Year(s)	Title	Notes	Ref.
2024–present	A Man on the Inside	with 3 Arts Entertainment, Dunshire Productions, Micromundo Productions, Motto Pictures and Universal Television	
2026–present	Dang!	with Rodeoscope, Panther Co., 3 Arts Entertainment, Titmouse, Inc., Alan Yang Pictures and Universal Television	

==== Former ====
Year(s)	Title	Notes	Ref.
2009–2015; 2020	Parks and Recreation	with Deedle-Dee Productions, Open 4 Business Productions, 3 Arts Entertainment, and Universal Television	
2013–2021	Brooklyn Nine-Nine	with Dr. Goor Productions, 3 Arts Entertainment, and Universal Television	
2015–2021	Master of None	with Alan Yang Pictures, Oh Brudder Productions, 3 Arts Entertainment, and Universal Television	
2016–2020	The Good Place	with 3 Arts Entertainment and Universal Television	
2019	Abby's	with Waila Inc. Productions, 3 Arts Entertainment, and Universal Television	
2019	Sunnyside	with Panther Co., 3 Arts Entertainment, and Universal Television	
2021–2022	Rutherford Falls	with Pacific Electric Picture Company, 3 Arts Entertainment, and Universal Television	
2021–2026	Hacks	with Paulilu, First Thought Productions, 3 Arts Entertainment, and Universal Television	
2021	Q-Force	with Hazy Mills Productions, 3 Arts Entertainment, and Universal Television	
2023	Primo	with Amazon Studios, 3 Arts Entertainment, and Universal Television	

==== Upcoming ====
- Dig (with Paper Kite Productions, Ocean Avenue, 3 Arts Entertainment, and Universal Television)
