= FJM =

FJM may refer to:

- Fallschirmjäger-Messer, a German World War II paratrooper knife
- Father John Misty, American musician
- Fire Joe Morgan, a sports blog
- Fly Jamaica Airways, a Jamaican airline
- The Four Just Men (novel) by Edgar Wallace
- Frank J. Myers, American singer with the label FJM
- Freefall jumpmaster
- Fujairah Men's College in the United Arab Emirates
