= Date and Switch =

2014 film by Chris Nelson

- Theatrical release poster
- Directed by: Chris Nelson
- Written by: Alan Yang
- Produced by: Jai Stefan; Laurence Mark; David Blackman
- Starring: Nicholas Braun; Hunter Cope; Dakota Johnson; Zach Cregger
- Cinematography: David Robert Jones
- Edited by: Tia Nolan; Akiko Iwakawa-Grieve
- Music by: Eric D. Johnson
- Production companies: Laurence Mark Productions; Lionsgate
- Distributed by: Lionsgate
- Release date: February 14, 2014
- Running time: 91 minutes
- Country: United States
- Language: English
- Budget: $2 million
- Box office: $28,222

Date and Switch is a 2014 American teen sex comedy film directed by Chris Nelson, written by Alan Yang, and starring Nicholas Braun, Hunter Cope, Dakota Johnson and Zach Cregger. The film's plot features Matty and Michael, two best friends who vow to have sex. Matty tells Michael that he is gay, which unexpectedly changes their quest.

== Plot ==
Best friends Matty and Michael break up with their high-school girlfriends, Em and Ava, while making a pact to have a sexual relationship with an older woman. Matty also comes out as gay to Em. Matty and Michael make a pot brownie as a motivational prize for having sex before prom, but Michael feels betrayed when Matty comes out to him. He avoids Matty until Em explains that his friend needs his support, and they go to a gay club where they unexpectedly meet two of their teachers. Outside the club, a young man named Greg hits Michael's car and they get into a fight.

Michael tries auditioning as a vocalist for Matty's band. At night, the friends go to another gay club where they take drugs and dance. Matty stops by Em's house and they have sex. Later, Matty meets Greg and they have fun together. Michael fails to get back together with Ava, and Em drives him to the garage and helps him talk with his mechanic. Later, after giving up on the band, Em tells Michael that Ava has been cheating on him. They hang out at a construction site and Michael begins to proposition Em when they see Matty making out with Greg, and all four feel awkward.

Matty and Michael mend their friendship the next day at a go-kart track. Michael tries to proposition Em again but she tells him about the night she and Matty had sex, and he leaves her. Michael gets drunk and outs Matty to his parents, and Matty sends him a hate message. Em criticizes Michael the next day at school. Ostracized, Michael returns to the first gay bar and meets Greg, and they learn that Matty won't talk to either of them.

At prom, Michael brings Greg as his date while Matty brings Em. Michael gets on stage and sings a song from his and Matty's fourth-grade play when they became best friends. Michael is accused of being gay and he responds that Greg is a cool guy and that he doesn't care if people call him gay. Michael and Matty apologize to Em and Greg and go to the parking lot. Michael was going to get rid of the pot brownie but Matty says that it's beautiful and artistic. They reconcile and, joined by Em and Greg, eat the brownie together. Too high to go back into the prom, they go out to a gay club and dance together, on what Matty declares to be the best day of his life.

== Cast ==
- Nicholas Braun as Michael
- Hunter Cope as Matty
- Dakota Johnson as Em
- Nick Offerman as Terry
- Gary Cole as Dwayne
- Megan Mullally as Patricia
- Sarah Hyland as Ava
- Brian Geraghty as Lars
- Zach Cregger as Greg
- Quinn Lord as Michael (8 years old)
- Adam DiMarco as Jared
- Aziz Ansari as Marcus
- Larry Wilmore as Mr. Vernon

== Production ==
Alan Yang started writing the script in 2009, originally titled Gay Dude. The film was reported to be part of Lionsgate's ten "microbudget" projects, all produced for under $2 million. The budget expanded to $6 million to include marketing cost. Principal photography began in Maple Ridge, British Columbia, in August 2011.

== Release ==
Date and Switch was released in eleven theatrical markets on February 14, 2014, in the United States as well as video on demand. The film opened on March 6, 2014, in six theaters in Singapore and grossed $28,222.

It was released to DVD and Blu-ray on April 15, 2014, and made approximately $77,667 in sales.

=== Critical reception ===
On the review aggregator website Rotten Tomatoes, 30% of 10 critics' reviews are positive, with an average rating of 4.5/10. Metacritic, which uses a weighted average, assigned the film a score of 56 out of 100, based on eight critics, indicating "mixed or average" reviews.

Jeannette Catsoulis of The New York Times wrote that the film "balances formula with winning performances, genuine humor, and a generosity of spirit that this genre often lacks". She also singled out actress Dakota Johnson, for her "standout" performance.
