= 68th Primetime Emmy Awards =

2016 American television programming awards

- Promotional poster
- Date: September 18, 2016 (Ceremony); September 10–11, 2016 (Creative Arts Awards)
- Location: Microsoft Theater, Los Angeles, California
- Presented by: Academy of Television Arts and Sciences
- Hosted by: Jimmy Kimmel

Highlights
- Most awards: Major: The People v. O. J. Simpson: American Crime Story (5); All: Game of Thrones (12)
- Most nominations: The People v. O. J. Simpson: American Crime Story (13)
- Outstanding Comedy Series: Veep
- Outstanding Drama Series: Game of Thrones
- Outstanding Limited Series: The People v. O. J. Simpson: American Crime Story
- Website: http://www.emmys.com/

Television/radio coverage
- Network: ABC
- Produced by: Don Mischer
- Directed by: Glenn Weiss

The 68th Primetime Emmy Awards honored the best in American prime time television programming from June 1, 2015, until May 31, 2016, as chosen by the Academy of Television Arts & Sciences. The ceremony was held on Sunday, September 18, 2016, at the Microsoft Theater in Downtown Los Angeles, California, where 27 awards were presented, and was broadcast in the U.S. by ABC. The ceremony was hosted by Jimmy Kimmel. It was preceded by the 68th Primetime Creative Arts Emmy Awards, which took place over two nights, September 10 and 11, at the Microsoft Theater.

The nominations were announced by Anthony Anderson and Lauren Graham on July 14, 2016. The crime anthology limited series The People v. O. J. Simpson: American Crime Story was the most nominated program at the ceremony with 13, and 22 overall, although Game of Thrones received the most overall nominations that year with 23 as the most nominated drama series.

With five awards, The People v. O. J. Simpson: American Crime Story won the most awards of the night, while the fantasy drama series Game of Thrones won three, including Outstanding Drama Series and surpassed Frasier (37) as the fictional television program with the most Primetime Emmy Awards with 38 wins in six seasons. Game of Thrones' win was also the second time a sixth season of any show had won the Outstanding Drama Series award after fellow HBO show, The Sopranos' Sixth season had won it in 2007.

Additionally, the political satire series Veep won Outstanding Comedy Series for the second time in a row, while its producer and lead star Julia Louis-Dreyfus established a new record of wins for Outstanding Lead Actress in a Comedy Series; it was her fifth consecutive win for the series, sixth overall in the category and her seventh overall win as an actor.

For the first time, none of the nominees for Outstanding Supporting Actress in a Drama Series were from the four major American broadcasting TV networks. In addition, Ben Mendelsohn became the first actor to win Outstanding Supporting Actor in a Drama Series for a series from a streaming service network; he won for Bloodline from Netflix.

This is the first and, as of 2020, the only ceremony where no network received more than one nomination in the Drama Series category. That feat occurred for the first in the Comedy Series category in 2023.

== Winners and nominees ==
Winners are listed first, highlighted in boldface, and indicated with a double dagger (‡). (Note: The outlets listed for each program are the U.S. broadcasters or streaming services identified in the nominations, which for some international productions are different from the broadcaster(s) that originally commissioned the program.) For simplicity, producers who received nominations for program awards have been omitted.

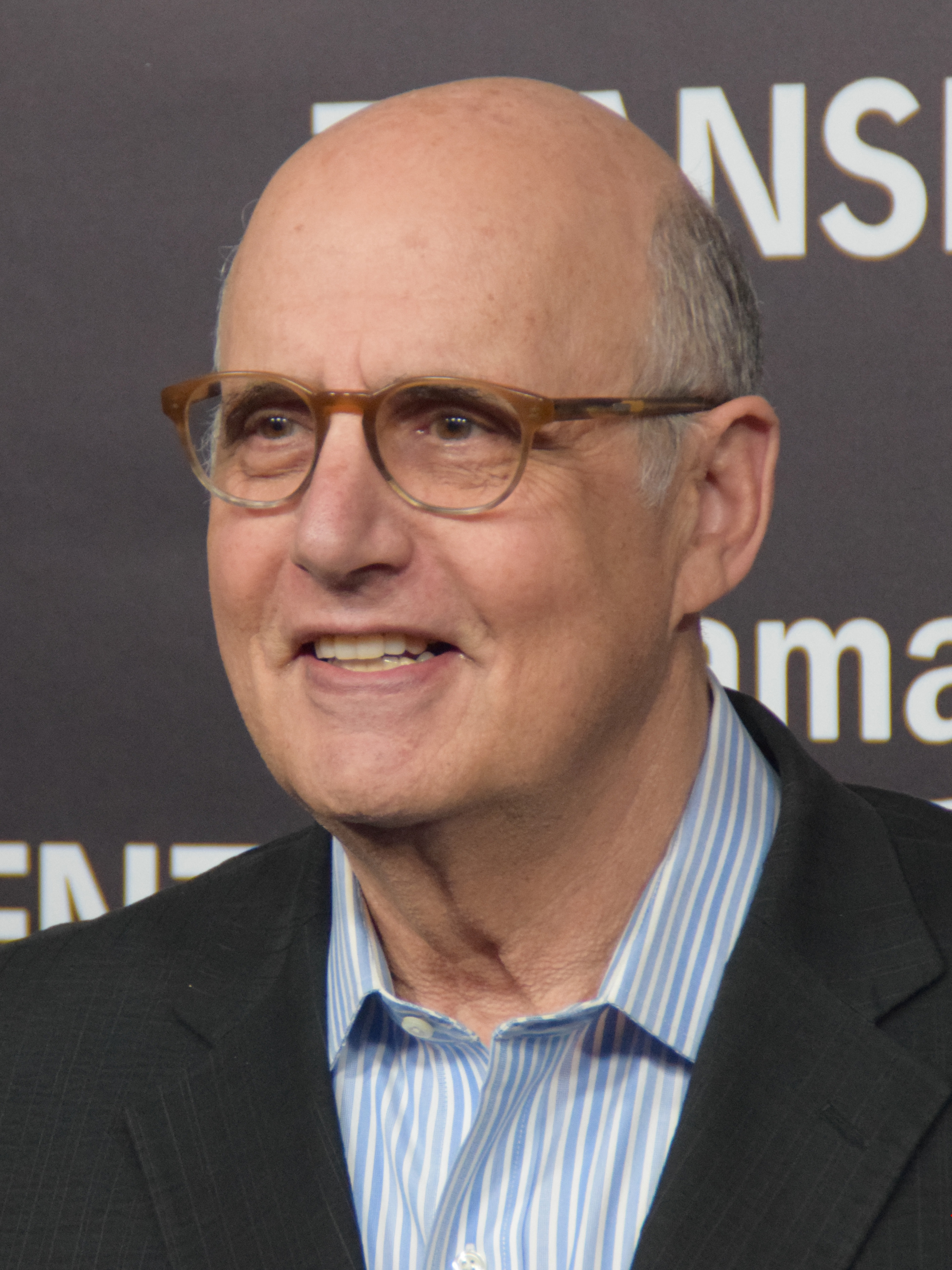
Jeffrey Tambor, Outstanding Lead Actor in a Comedy Series winner

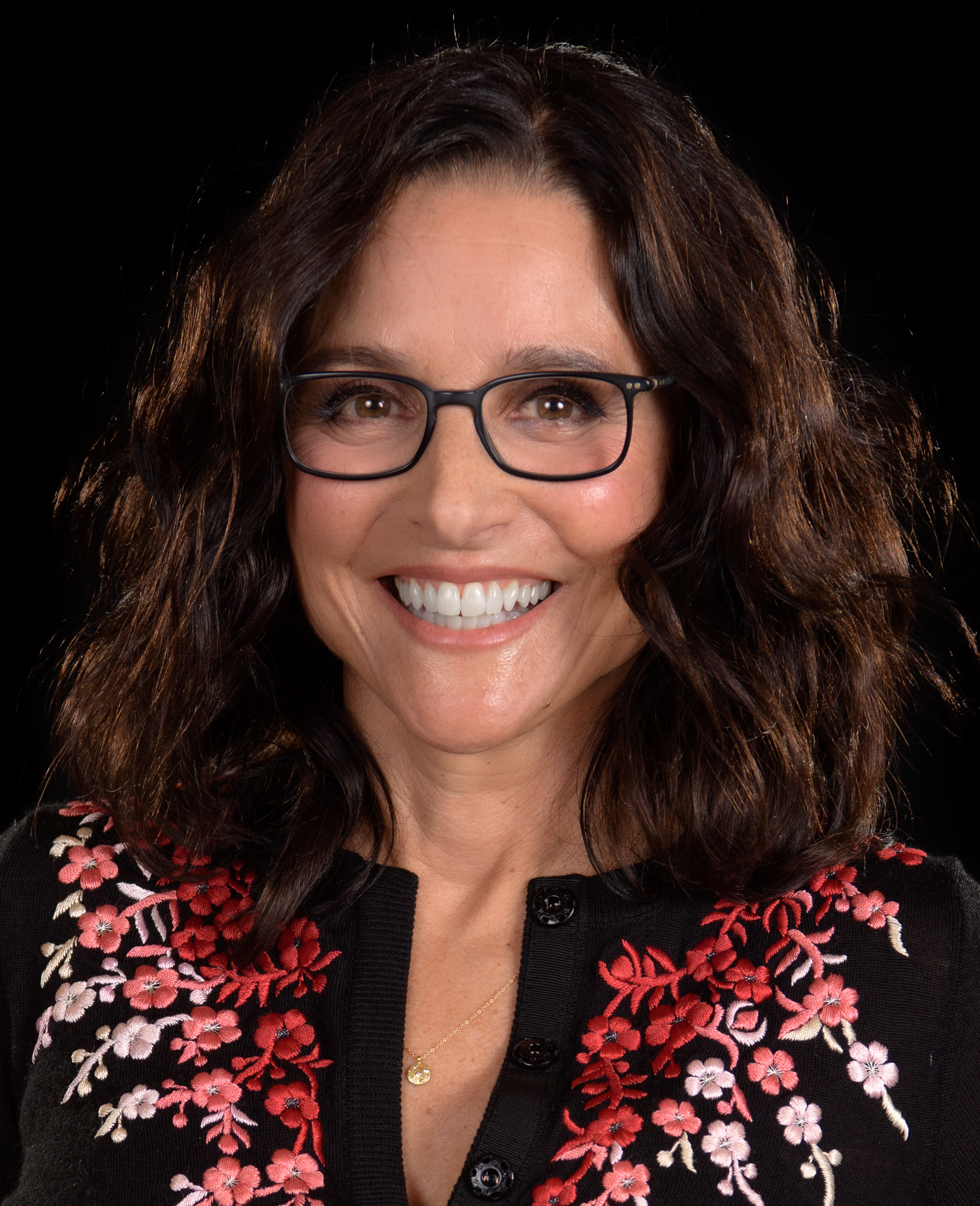
Julia Louis-Dreyfus, Outstanding Lead Actress in a Comedy Series winner

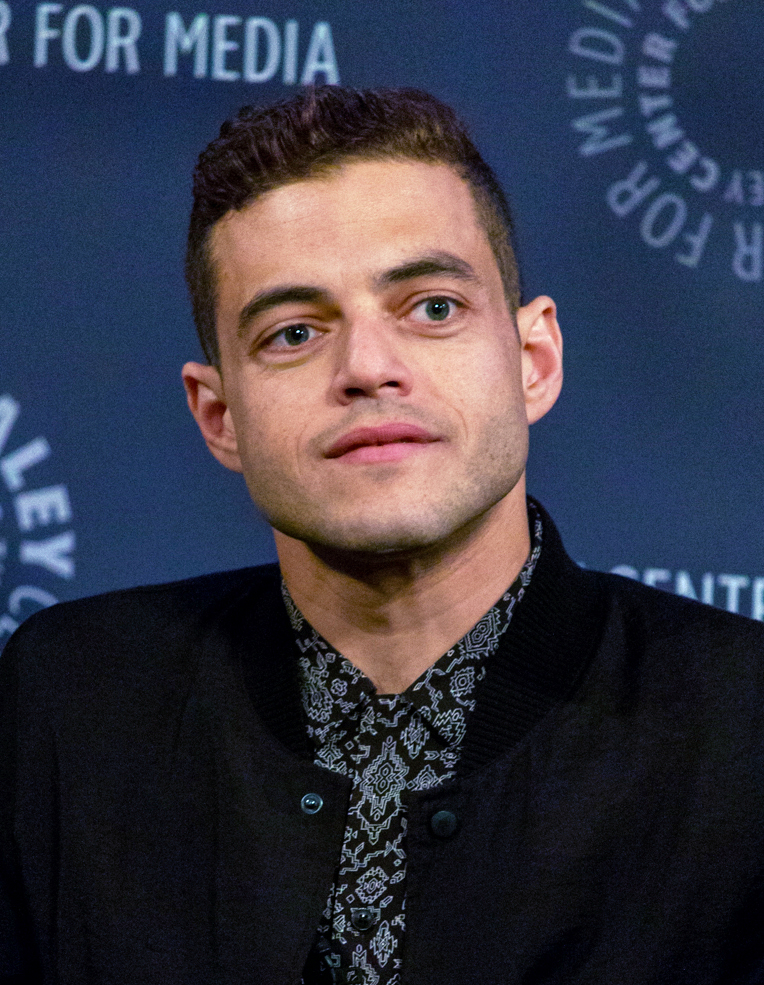
Rami Malek, Outstanding Lead Actor in Drama Series winner

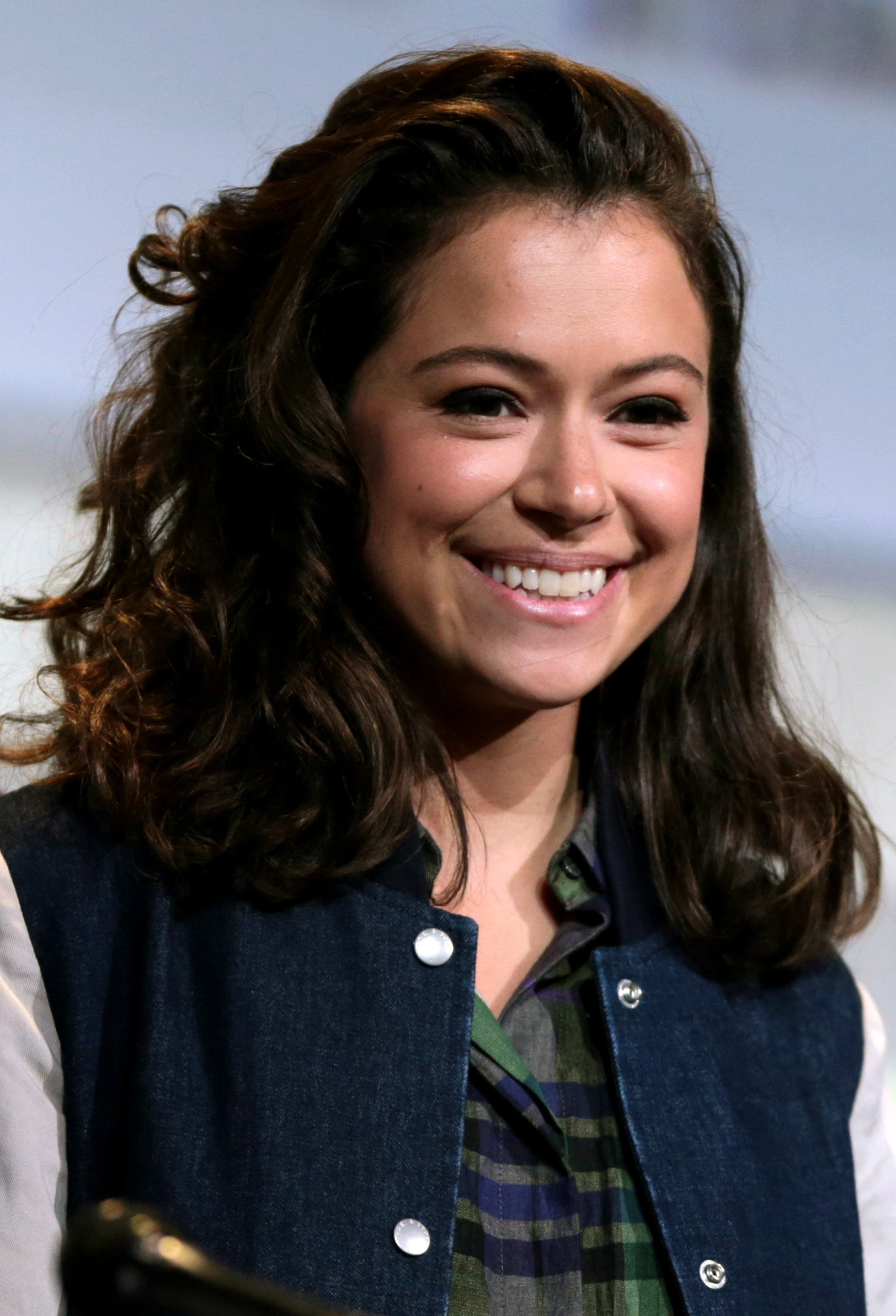
Tatiana Maslany, Outstanding Lead Actress in a Drama Series winner

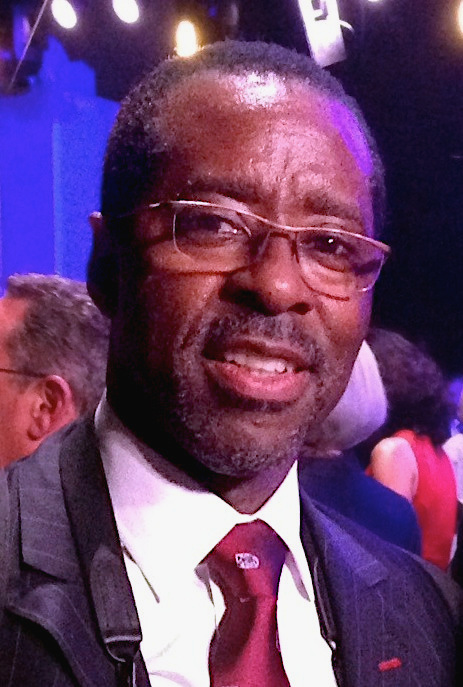
Courtney B. Vance, Outstanding Lead Actor in a Limited Series or Movie winner

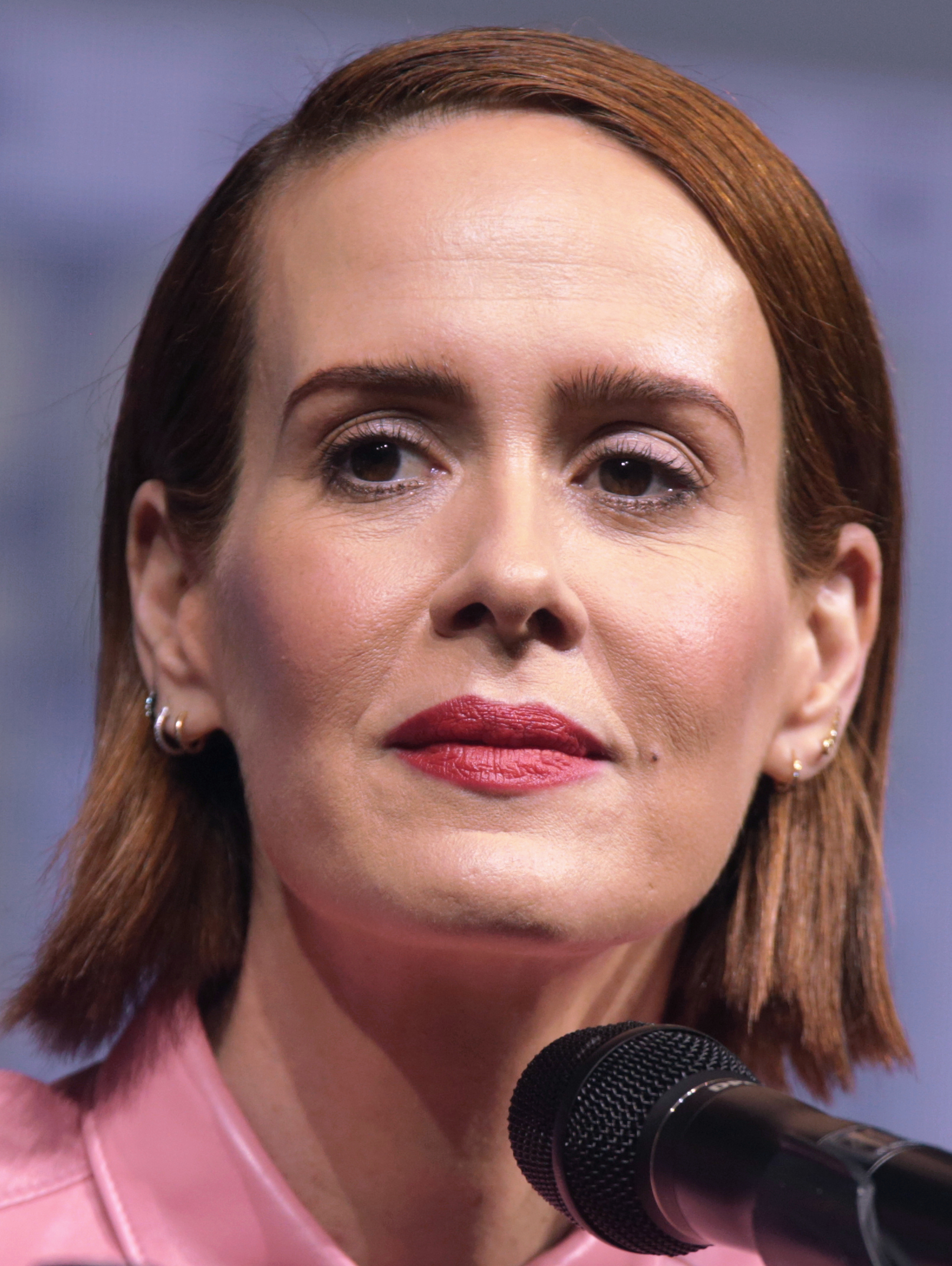
Sarah Paulson, Outstanding Lead Actress in a Limited Series or Movie winner

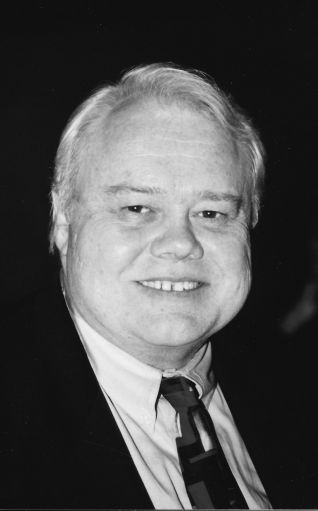
Louie Anderson, Outstanding Supporting Actor in a Comedy Series winner

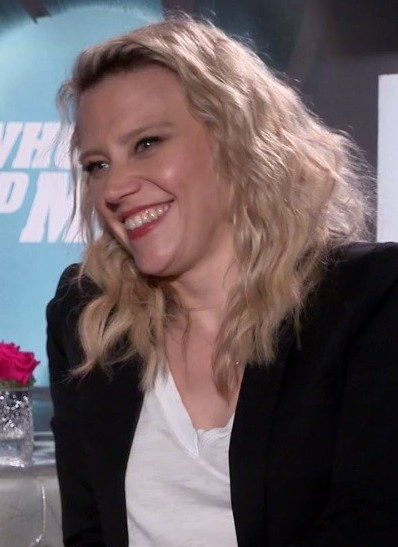
Kate McKinnon, Outstanding Supporting Actress in a Comedy Series winner

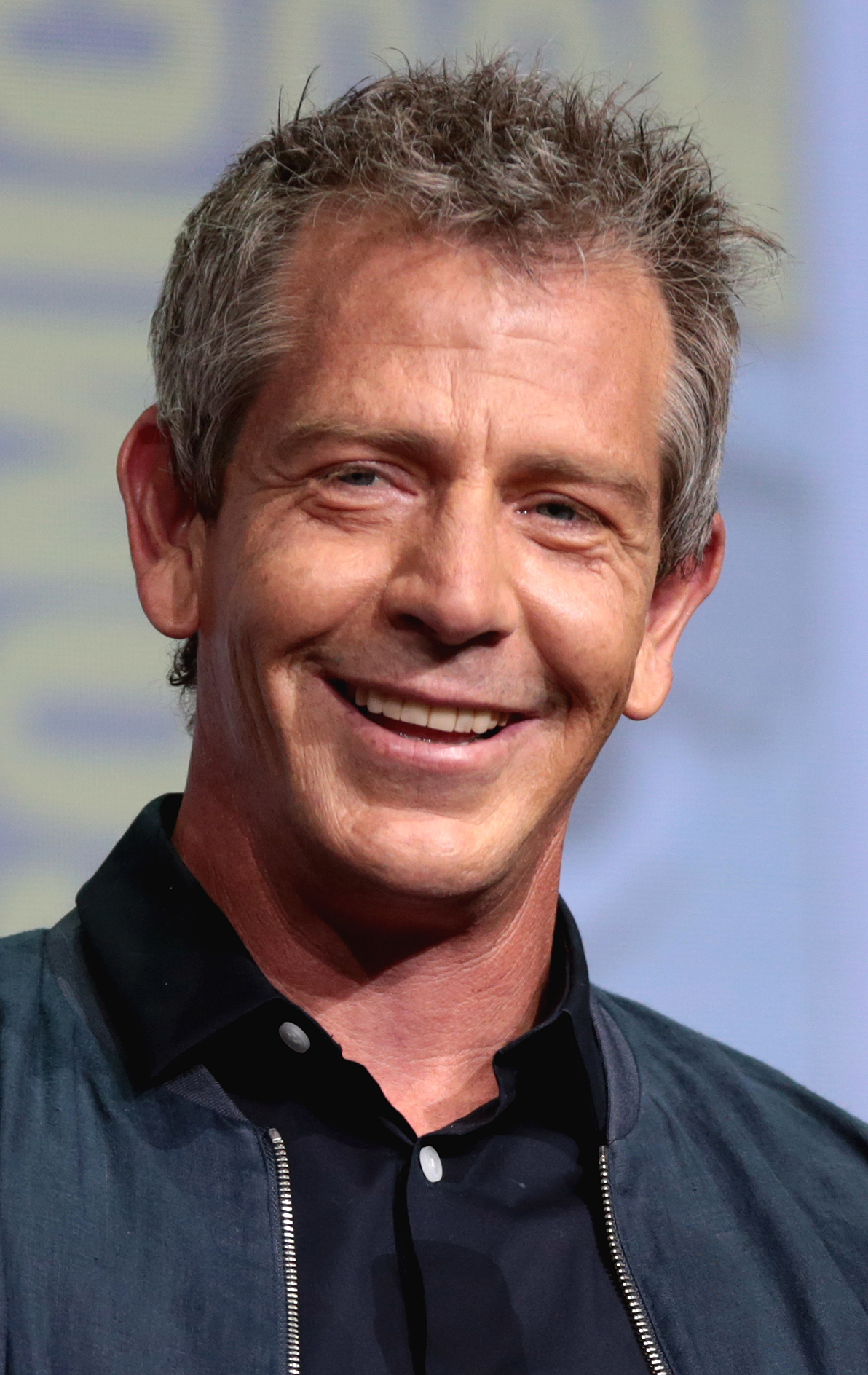
Ben Mendelsohn, Outstanding Supporting Actor in a Drama Series winner

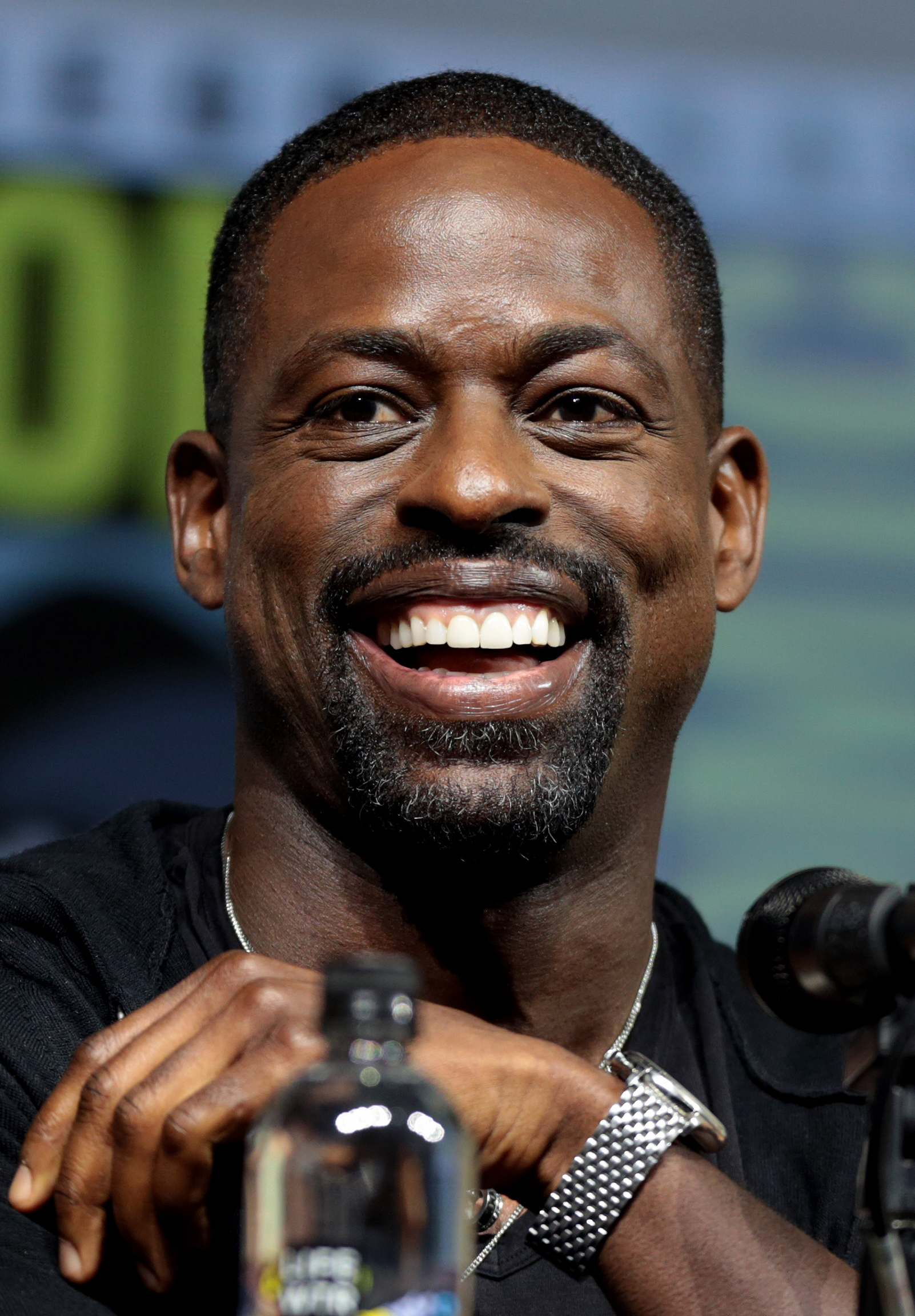
Sterling K. Brown, Outstanding Supporting Actor in a Limited Series or Movie winner

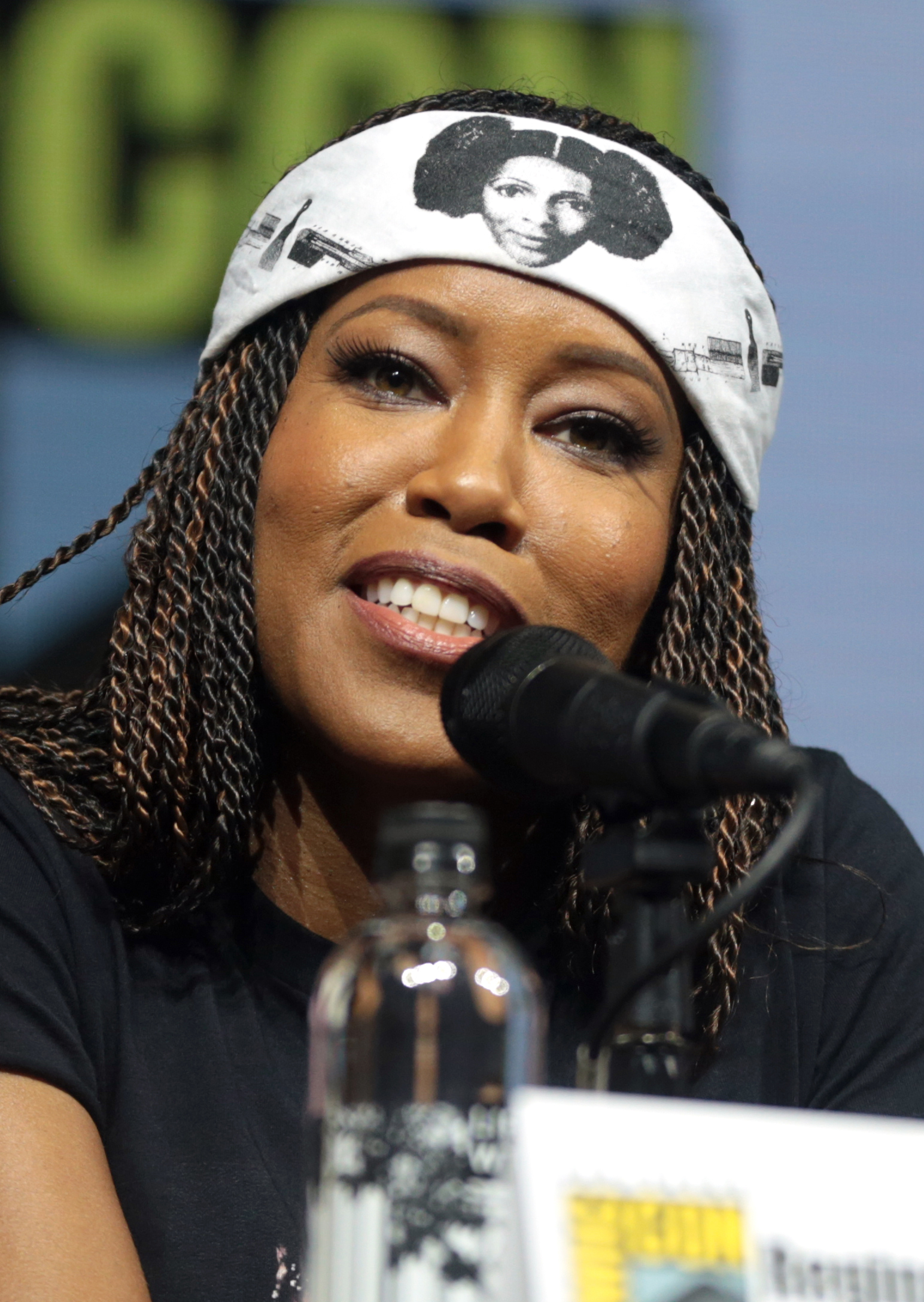
Regina King, Outstanding Supporting Actress in a Limited Series or Movie winner

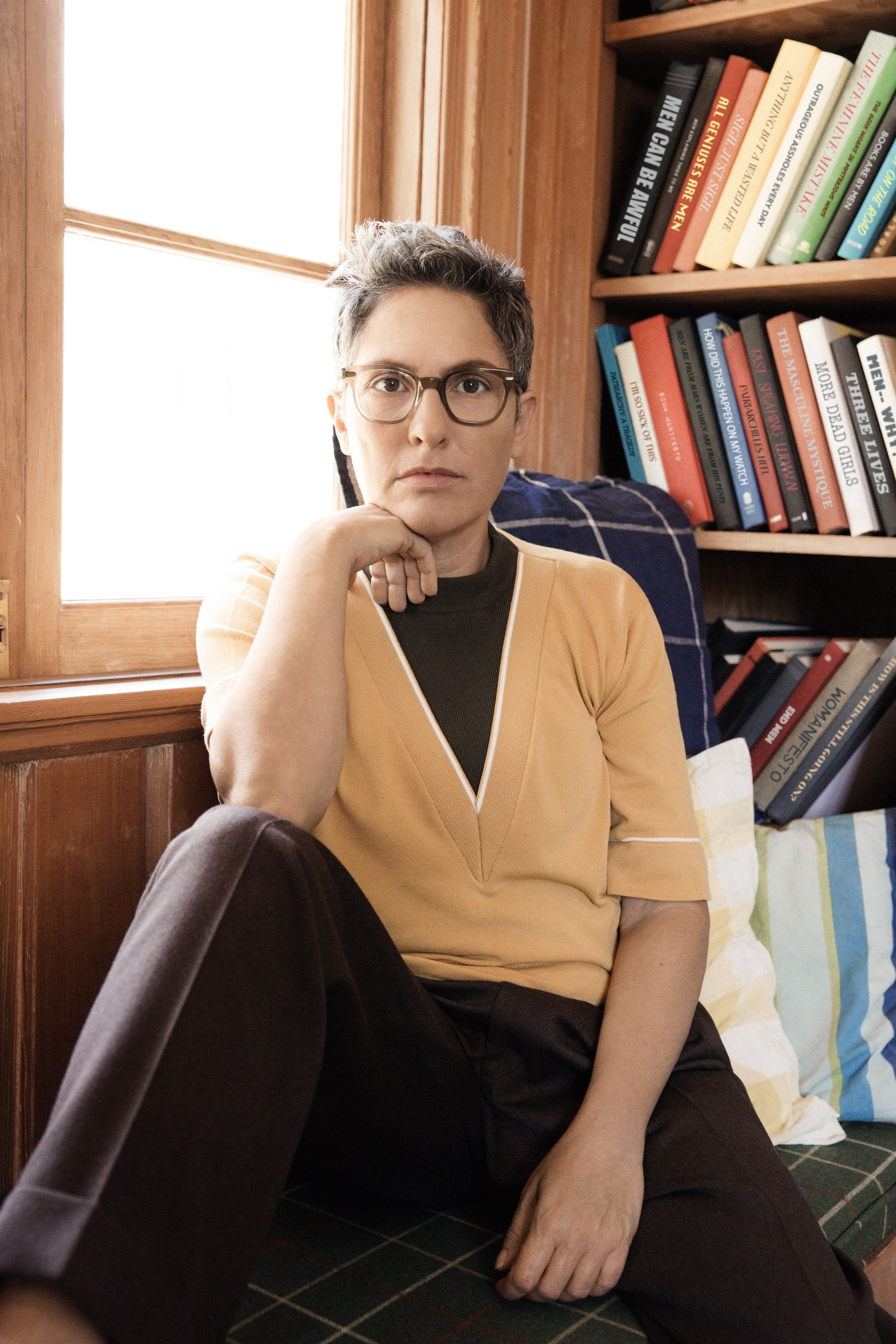
Joey Soloway, Outstanding Directing for a Comedy Series winner

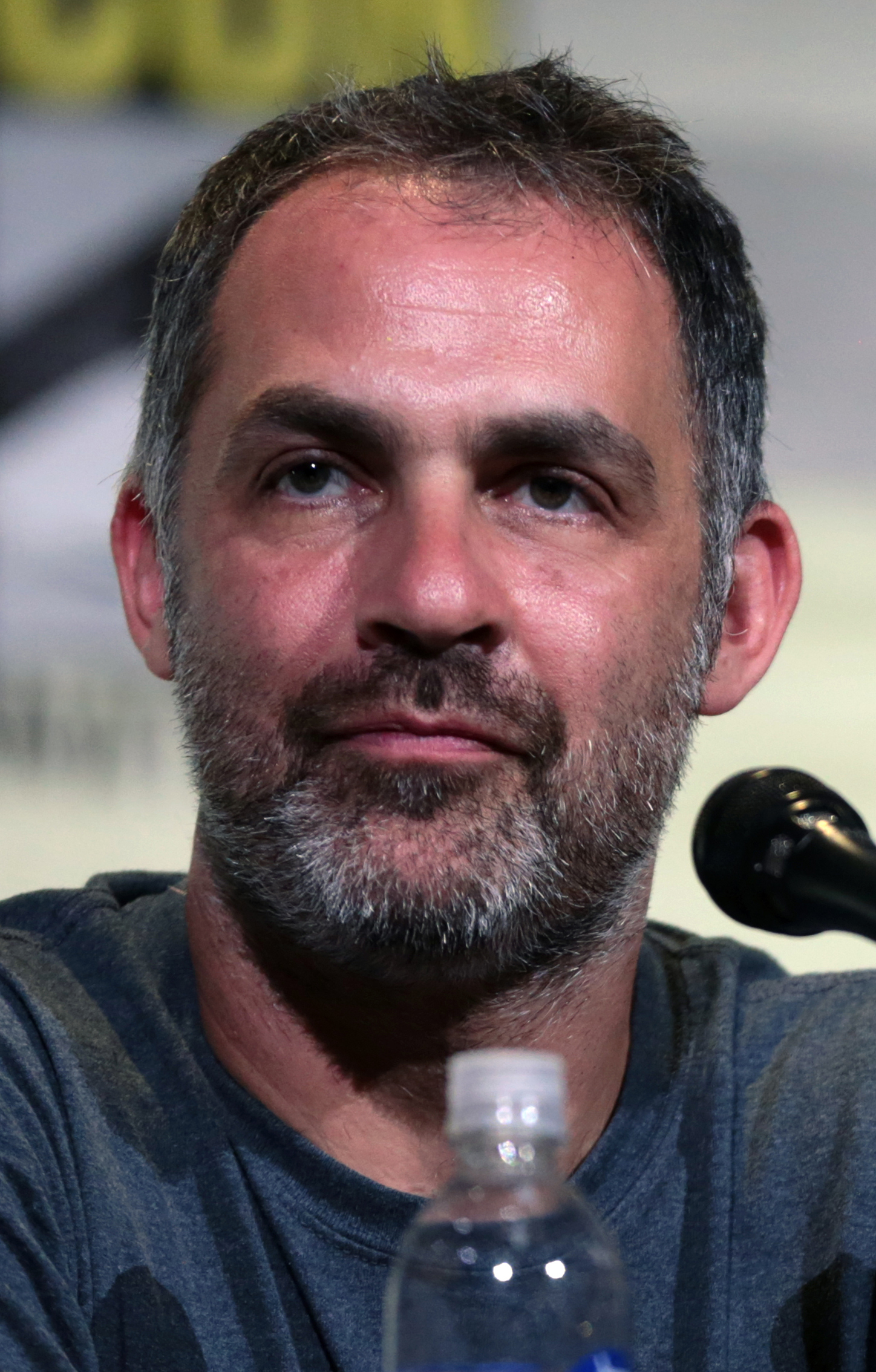
Miguel Sapochnik, Outstanding Directing for a Drama Series winner

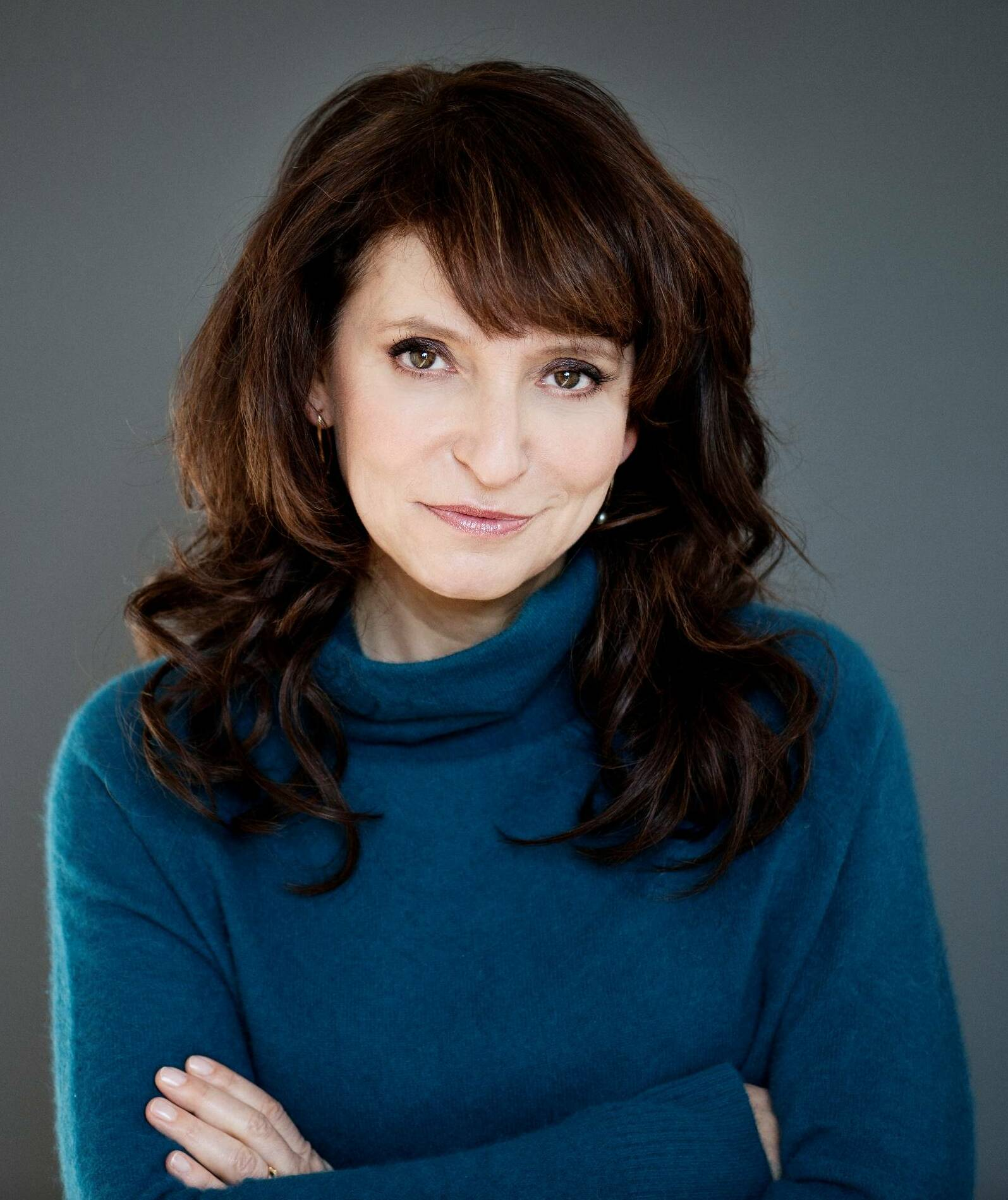
Susanne Bier, Outstanding Directing for a Limited Series, Movie or Dramatic Special winner

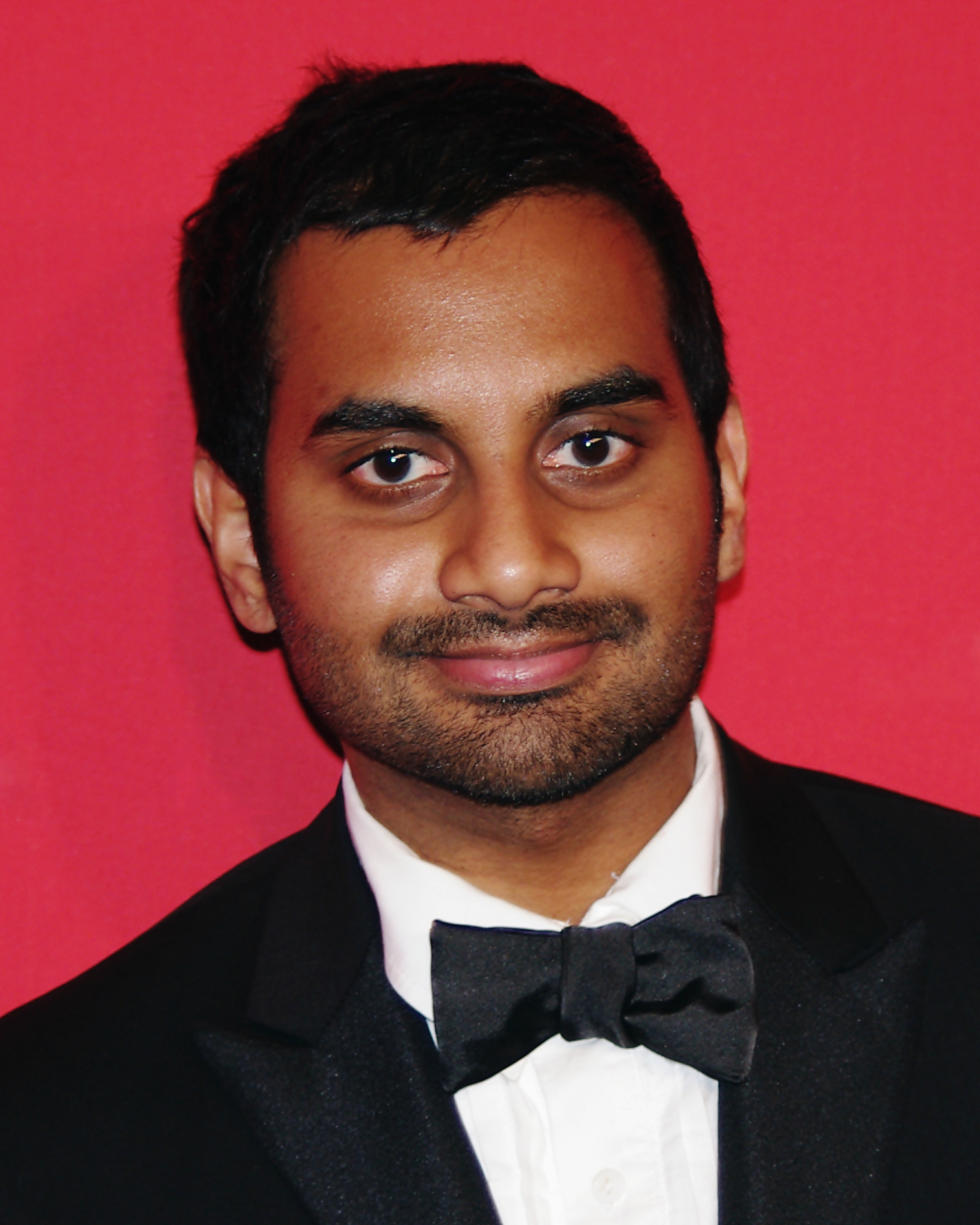
Aziz Ansari, Outstanding Writing for a Comedy Series co-winner

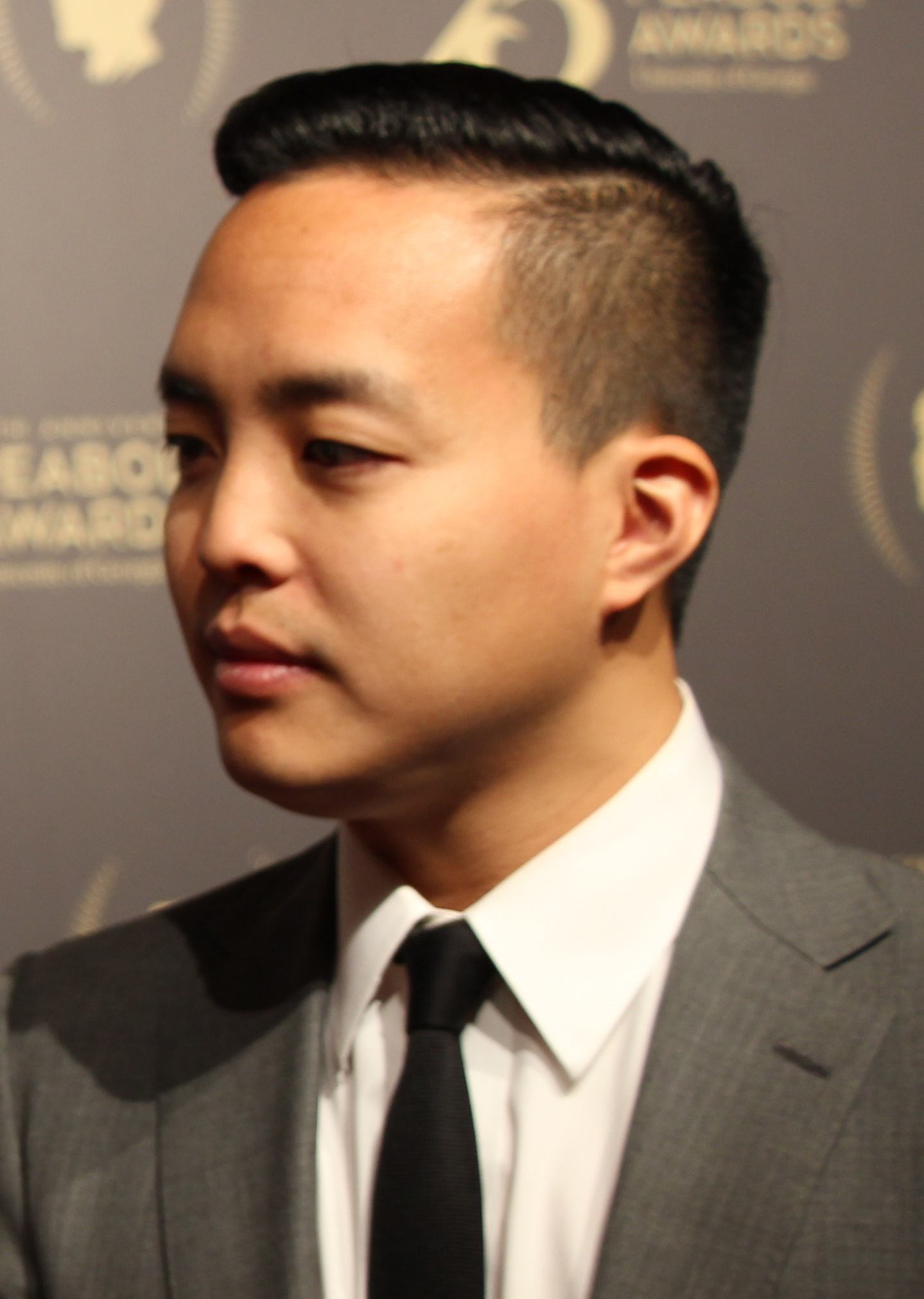
Alan Yang, Outstanding Writing for a Comedy Series co-winner

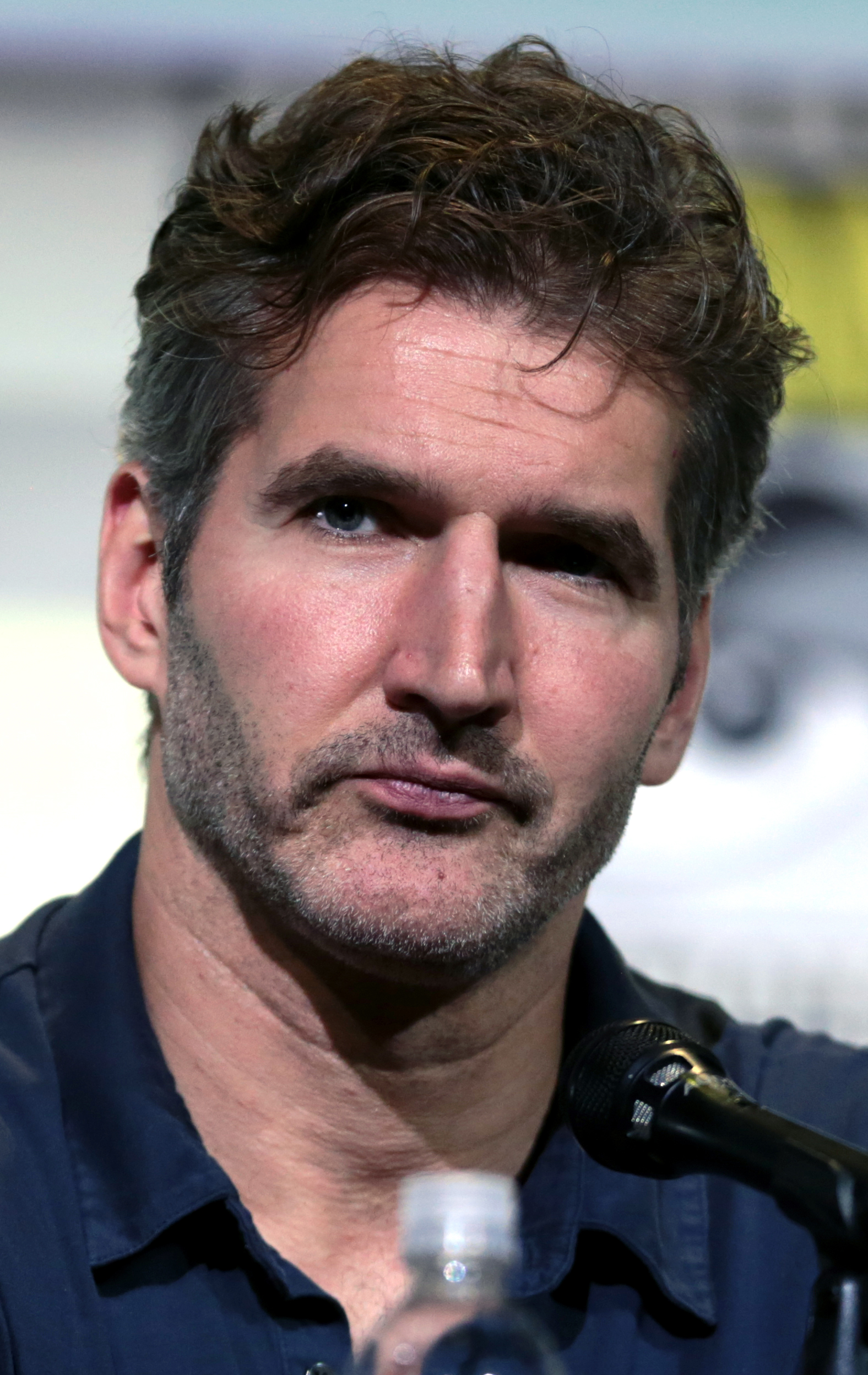
David Benioff, Outstanding Writing for a Drama Series co-winner

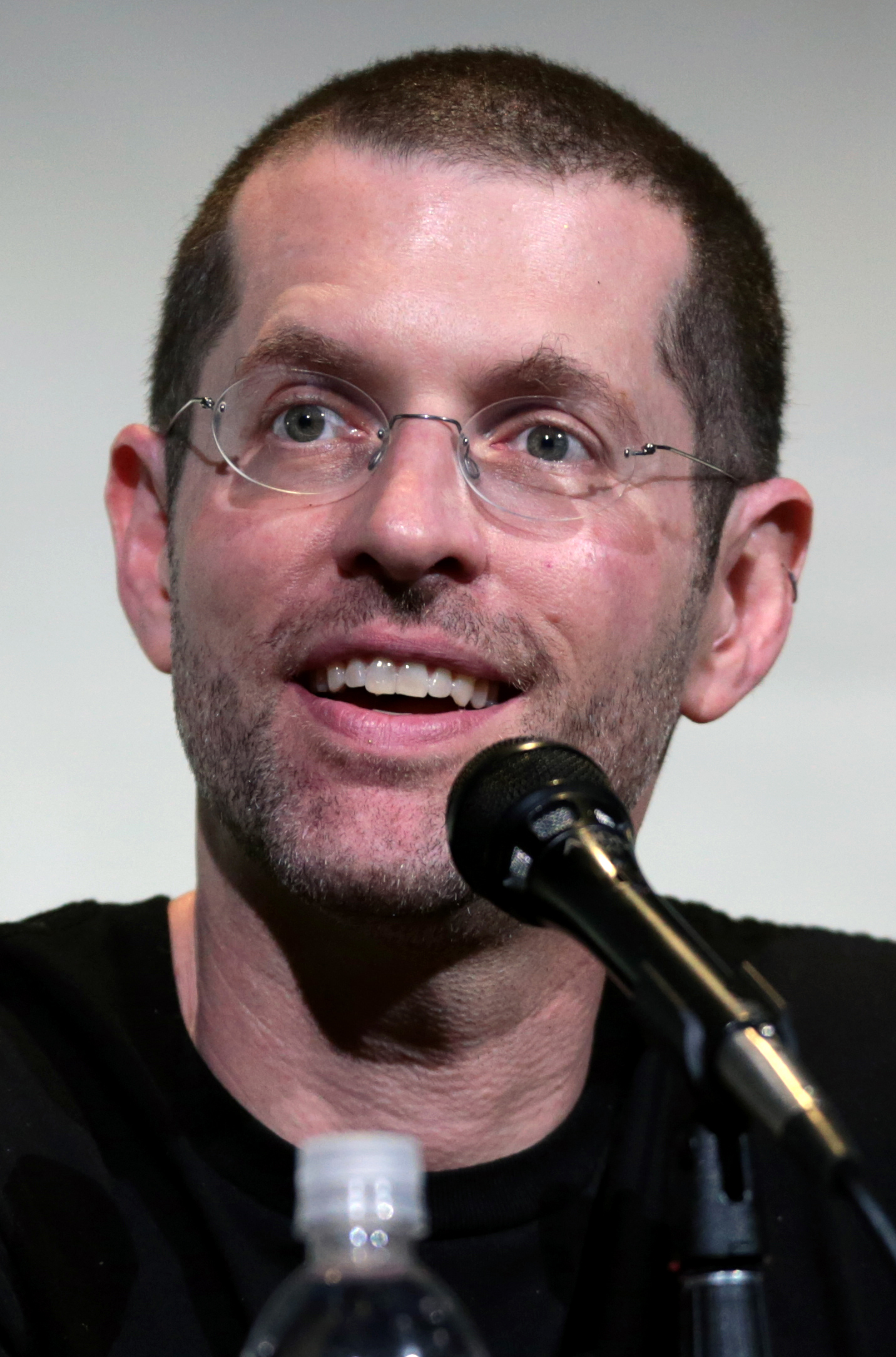
D. B. Weiss, Outstanding Writing for a Drama Series co-winner

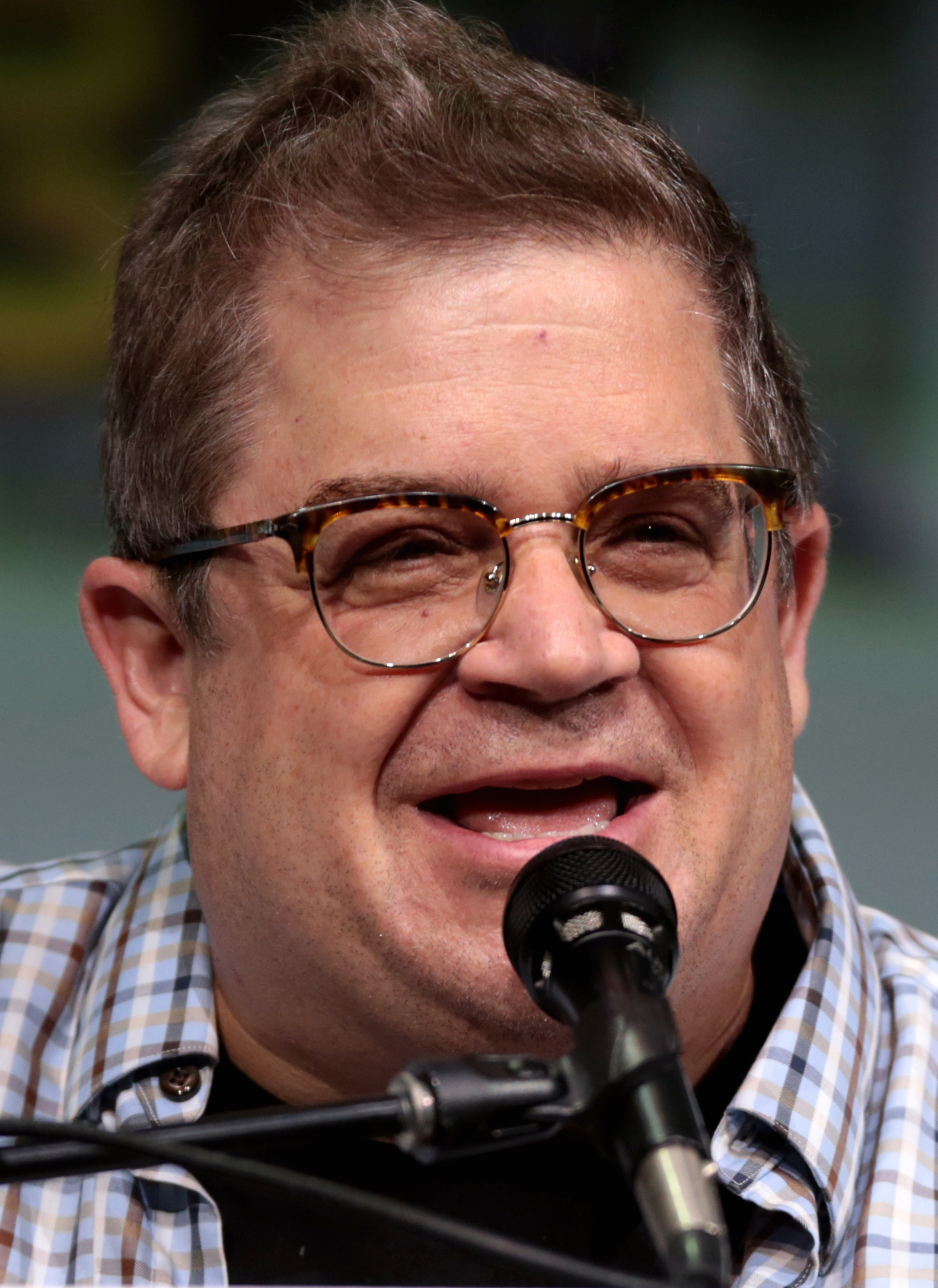
Patton Oswalt, Outstanding Writing for a Variety Special winner

=== Programs ===
Programs
**Outstanding Comedy Series**: **Veep (HBO)**‡; Black-ish (ABC); Master of None (Netflix); Modern Family (ABC); Silicon Valley (HBO); Transparent (Amazon); Unbreakable Kimmy Schmidt (Netflix)	**Outstanding Drama Series**: **Game of Thrones (HBO)**‡; The Americans (FX); Better Call Saul (AMC); Downton Abbey (PBS); Homeland (Showtime); House of Cards (Netflix); Mr. Robot (USA)
**Outstanding Variety Talk Series**: **Last Week Tonight with John Oliver (HBO)**‡; Comedians in Cars Getting Coffee (Crackle); Jimmy Kimmel Live! (ABC); The Late Late Show with James Corden (CBS); Real Time with Bill Maher (HBO); The Tonight Show Starring Jimmy Fallon (NBC)	**Outstanding Variety Sketch Series**: **Key & Peele (Comedy Central)**‡; Documentary Now! (IFC); Drunk History (Comedy Central); Inside Amy Schumer (Comedy Central); Portlandia (IFC); Saturday Night Live (NBC)
**Outstanding Limited Series**: **The People v. O. J. Simpson: American Crime Story (FX)**‡; American Crime (ABC); Fargo (FX); The Night Manager (AMC); Roots (History)	**Outstanding Television Movie**: **Sherlock: The Abominable Bride (PBS)**‡; All the Way (HBO); Confirmation (HBO); Luther (BBC America); A Very Murray Christmas (Netflix)
**Outstanding Reality-Competition Program**: **The Voice (NBC)**‡; The Amazing Race (CBS); American Ninja Warrior (NBC); Dancing with the Stars (ABC); Project Runway (Lifetime); Top Chef (Bravo)

=== Acting ===
==== Lead performances ====
Lead performances
**Outstanding Lead Actor in a Comedy Series**: **Jeffrey Tambor – Transparent as Maura Pfefferman (Amazon)**‡; Anthony Anderson – Black-ish as Andre "Dre" Johnson Sr. (ABC); Aziz Ansari – Master of None as Dev Shah (Netflix); Will Forte – The Last Man on Earth as Phil "Tandy" Miller (Fox); William H. Macy – Shameless as Frank Gallagher (Showtime); Thomas Middleditch – Silicon Valley as Richard Hendricks (HBO)	**Outstanding Lead Actress in a Comedy Series**: **Julia Louis-Dreyfus – Veep as President Selina Meyer (HBO)**‡; Ellie Kemper – Unbreakable Kimmy Schmidt as Kimmy Schmidt (Netflix); Laurie Metcalf – Getting On as Dr. Jenna James (HBO); Tracee Ellis Ross – Black-ish as Dr. Rainbow "Bow" Johnson (ABC); Amy Schumer – Inside Amy Schumer as Amy (Comedy Central); Lily Tomlin – Grace and Frankie as Frankie Bergstein (Netflix)
**Outstanding Lead Actor in a Drama Series**: **Rami Malek – Mr. Robot as Elliot Alderson (USA)**‡; Kyle Chandler – Bloodline as John Rayburn (Netflix); Bob Odenkirk – Better Call Saul as Jimmy McGill (AMC); Matthew Rhys – The Americans as Philip Jennings (FX); Liev Schreiber – Ray Donovan as Ray Donovan (Showtime); Kevin Spacey – House of Cards as President Frank Underwood (Netflix)	**Outstanding Lead Actress in a Drama Series**: **Tatiana Maslany – Orphan Black as various characters (BBC America)**‡; Claire Danes – Homeland as Carrie Mathison (Showtime); Viola Davis – How to Get Away with Murder as Prof. Annalise Keating (ABC); Taraji P. Henson – Empire as Cookie Lyon (Fox); Keri Russell – The Americans as Elizabeth Jennings (FX); Robin Wright – House of Cards as First Lady Claire Underwood (Netflix)
**Outstanding Lead Actor in a Limited Series or Movie**: **Courtney B. Vance – The People v. O. J. Simpson: American Crime Story as Johnnie Cochran (FX)**‡; Bryan Cranston – All the Way as President Lyndon B. Johnson (HBO); Benedict Cumberbatch – Sherlock: The Abominable Bride as Sherlock Holmes (PBS); Idris Elba – Luther as DCI John Luther (BBC America); Cuba Gooding Jr. – The People v. O. J. Simpson: American Crime Story as O. J. Simpson (FX); Tom Hiddleston – The Night Manager as Jonathan Pine (AMC)	**Outstanding Lead Actress in a Limited Series or Movie**: **Sarah Paulson – The People v. O. J. Simpson: American Crime Story as Marcia Clark (FX)**‡; Kirsten Dunst – Fargo as Peggy Blumquist (FX); Felicity Huffman – American Crime as Leslie Graham (ABC); Audra McDonald – Lady Day at Emerson's Bar and Grill as Billie Holiday (HBO); Lili Taylor – American Crime as Anne Blaine (ABC); Kerry Washington – Confirmation as Anita Hill (HBO)

==== Supporting performances ====
Supporting performances
**Outstanding Supporting Actor in a Comedy Series**: **Louie Anderson – Baskets as Christine Baskets (FX)**‡; Andre Braugher – Brooklyn Nine-Nine as Captain Ray Holt (Fox); Tituss Burgess – Unbreakable Kimmy Schmidt as Titus Andromedon (Netflix); Ty Burrell – Modern Family as Phil Dunphy (ABC); Tony Hale – Veep as Gary Walsh (HBO); Keegan-Michael Key – Key & Peele as various characters (Comedy Central); Matt Walsh – Veep as Mike McLintock (HBO)	**Outstanding Supporting Actress in a Comedy Series**: **Kate McKinnon – Saturday Night Live as various characters (NBC)**‡; Anna Chlumsky – Veep as Amy Brookheimer (HBO); Gaby Hoffmann – Transparent as Alexandria "Ali" Pfefferman (Amazon); Allison Janney – Mom as Bonnie Plunkett (CBS); Judith Light – Transparent as Shelly Pfefferman (Amazon); Niecy Nash – Getting On as Denise "DiDi" Ortley (HBO)
**Outstanding Supporting Actor in a Drama Series**: **Ben Mendelsohn – Bloodline as Danny Rayburn (Netflix)**‡; Jonathan Banks – Better Call Saul as Mike Ehrmantraut (AMC); Peter Dinklage – Game of Thrones as Tyrion Lannister (HBO); Kit Harington – Game of Thrones as Jon Snow (HBO); Michael Kelly – House of Cards as Doug Stamper (Netflix); Jon Voight – Ray Donovan as Mickey Donovan (Showtime)	**Outstanding Supporting Actress in a Drama Series**: **Maggie Smith – Downton Abbey as Violet Crawley, Dowager Countess of Grantham (PBS)**‡; Emilia Clarke – Game of Thrones as Daenerys Targaryen (HBO); Lena Headey – Game of Thrones as Cersei Lannister (HBO); Maura Tierney – The Affair as Helen Solloway (Showtime); Maisie Williams – Game of Thrones as Arya Stark (HBO); Constance Zimmer – UnREAL as Quinn King (Lifetime)
**Outstanding Supporting Actor in a Limited Series or Movie**: **Sterling K. Brown – The People v. O. J. Simpson: American Crime Story as Christopher Darden (FX)**‡; Hugh Laurie – The Night Manager as Richard Onslow Roper (AMC); Jesse Plemons – Fargo as Ed Blumquist (FX); David Schwimmer – The People v. O. J. Simpson: American Crime Story as Robert Kardashian (FX); John Travolta – The People v. O. J. Simpson: American Crime Story as Robert Shapiro (FX); Bokeem Woodbine – Fargo as Mike Milligan (FX)	**Outstanding Supporting Actress in a Limited Series or Movie**: **Regina King – American Crime as Terri LaCroix (ABC)**‡; Kathy Bates – American Horror Story: Hotel as Iris (FX); Olivia Colman – The Night Manager as Angela Burr (AMC); Melissa Leo – All the Way as Lady Bird Johnson (HBO); Sarah Paulson – American Horror Story: Hotel as Sally McKenna (FX); Jean Smart – Fargo as Floyd Gerhardt (FX)

=== Directing ===
Directing
**Outstanding Directing for a Comedy Series**: **Transparent: "Man on the Land" – Joey Soloway (Amazon)**‡; Master of None: "Parents" – Aziz Ansari (Netflix); Silicon Valley: "Daily Active Users" – Alec Berg (HBO); Silicon Valley: "Founder Friendly" – Mike Judge (HBO); Veep: "Kissing Your Sister" – David Mandel (HBO); Veep: "Morning After" – Chris Addison (HBO); Veep: "Mother" – Dale Stern (HBO)	**Outstanding Directing for a Drama Series**: **Game of Thrones: "Battle of the Bastards" – Miguel Sapochnik (HBO)**‡; Downton Abbey: "Episode Nine" – Michael Engler (PBS); Game of Thrones: "The Door" – Jack Bender (HBO); Homeland: "The Tradition of Hospitality" – Lesli Linka Glatter (Showtime); The Knick: "This Is All We Are" – Steven Soderbergh (Cinemax); Ray Donovan: "Exsuscito" – David Hollander (Showtime)
**Outstanding Directing for a Variety Special**: **Grease: Live – Thomas Kail and Alex Rudzinski (Fox)**‡; 58th Grammy Awards – Louis J. Horvitz (CBS); Adele Live in New York City – Beth McCarthy-Miller (NBC); Amy Schumer: Live at the Apollo – Chris Rock (HBO); The Kennedy Center Honors – Glenn Weiss (CBS); Lemonade – Kahlil Joseph and Beyoncé Knowles Carter (HBO)	**Outstanding Directing for a Limited Series, Movie or Dramatic Special**: **The Night Manager – Susanne Bier (AMC)**‡; All the Way – Jay Roach (HBO); Fargo: "Before the Law" – Noah Hawley (FX); The People v. O. J. Simpson: American Crime Story: "From the Ashes of Tragedy" – Ryan Murphy (FX); The People v. O. J. Simpson: American Crime Story: "Manna from Heaven" – Anthony Hemingway (FX); The People v. O. J. Simpson: American Crime Story: "The Race Card" – John Singleton (FX)

=== Writing ===
Writing
**Outstanding Writing for a Comedy Series**: **Master of None: "Parents" – Aziz Ansari and Alan Yang (Netflix)**‡; Catastrophe: "Episode 1" – Rob Delaney and Sharon Horgan (Amazon); Silicon Valley: "Founder Friendly" – Dan O'Keefe (HBO); Silicon Valley: "The Uptick" – Alec Berg (HBO); Veep: "Morning After" – David Mandel (HBO); Veep: "Mother" – Alex Gregory and Peter Huyck (HBO)	**Outstanding Writing for a Drama Series**: **Game of Thrones: "Battle of the Bastards" – David Benioff and D. B. Weiss (HBO)**‡; The Americans: "Persona Non Grata" – Joel Fields and Joe Weisberg (FX); Downton Abbey: "Episode Eight" – Julian Fellowes (PBS); The Good Wife: "End" – Robert King and Michelle King (CBS); Mr. Robot: "eps1.0 hellofriend.mov" – Sam Esmail (USA); UnREAL: "Return" – Marti Noxon and Sarah Gertrude Shapiro (Lifetime)
**Outstanding Writing for a Variety Special**: **Patton Oswalt: Talking for Clapping – Patton Oswalt (Netflix)**‡; Amy Schumer: Live at the Apollo – Amy Schumer (HBO); John Mulaney: The Comeback Kid – John Mulaney (Netflix); Tig Notaro: Boyish Girl Interrupted – Tig Notaro (HBO); Triumph's Election Special 2016 (Hulu)	**Outstanding Writing for a Limited Series, Movie or Dramatic Special**: **The People v. O. J. Simpson: American Crime Story: "Marcia, Marcia, Marcia" – D. V. DeVincentis (FX)**‡; Fargo: "Loplop" – Bob DeLaurentis (FX); Fargo: "Palindrome" – Noah Hawley (FX); The Night Manager – David Farr (AMC); The People v. O. J. Simpson: American Crime Story: "From the Ashes of Tragedy" – Scott Alexander and Larry Karaszewski (FX); The People v. O. J. Simpson: American Crime Story: "The Race Card" – Joe Robert Cole (FX)

== Most major nominations ==
Networks with multiple major nominations (Note: "Major" constitutes the categories listed above: Program, Acting, Directing, and Writing. Does not include the technical categories.)
Network	No. of Nominations
HBO	40
FX	28
Netflix	17
ABC	12
AMC	9
Showtime	8
Amazon	6
CBS	6
NBC	6
PBS	6
Comedy Central	5
Fox	4
BBC America	3
Lifetime	3
USA	3

Programs with multiple major nominations
Program	Category	Network	No. of Nominations
The People v. O. J. Simpson: American Crime Story	Limited	FX	13
Veep	Comedy	HBO	10
Game of Thrones	Drama	HBO	9
Fargo	Limited	FX	8
The Night Manager	Limited	AMC	6
Silicon Valley	Comedy	HBO	6
Transparent	Comedy	Amazon	5
All the Way	Movie	HBO	4
American Crime	Limited	ABC	4
The Americans	Drama	FX	4
Downton Abbey	Drama	PBS	4
House of Cards	Drama	Netflix	4
Master of None	Comedy	Netflix	4
Better Call Saul	Drama	AMC	3
Black-ish	Comedy	ABC	3
Homeland	Drama	Showtime	3
Mr. Robot	Drama	USA	3
Ray Donovan	Drama	Showtime	3
Unbreakable Kimmy Schmidt	Comedy	Netflix	3
American Horror Story: Hotel	Limited	FX	2
Amy Schumer: Live at the Apollo	Variety Special	HBO	2
Bloodline	Drama	Netflix	2
Confirmation	Movie	HBO	2
Getting On	Comedy	HBO	2
Inside Amy Schumer	Variety Sketch	Comedy Central	2
Key & Peele	Variety Sketch	Comedy Central	2
Luther	Movie	BBC America	2
Modern Family	Comedy	ABC	2
Saturday Night Live	Variety Sketch	NBC	2
Sherlock: The Abominable Bride	Movie	PBS	2
UnREAL	Drama	Lifetime	2

== Most major awards ==
Networks with multiple major awards
Network	No. of Awards
FX	6
HBO	6
Netflix	3
Amazon	2
NBC	2
PBS	2

Programs with multiple major awards
Program	Category	Network	No. of Awards
The People v. O. J. Simpson: American Crime Story	Limited	FX	5
Game of Thrones	Drama	HBO	3
Transparent	Comedy	Amazon	2
Veep	Comedy	HBO	2

== Presenters and performers ==
The awards were presented by the following:

=== Presenters ===
Name(s)	Role
Anthony Anderson; Tracee Ellis Ross	Presenters of the award for Outstanding Supporting Actor in a Comedy Series
Julie Bowen; Matt LeBlanc	Presenters of the award for Outstanding Writing for a Comedy Series
Kristen Bell; Joel McHale	Presenters of the award for Outstanding Supporting Actress in a Comedy Series
Randall Park; Constance Wu	Introducers of Outstanding Guest Actor in a Comedy Series winner Peter Scolari
Peter Scolari	Presenter of the award for Outstanding Directing for a Comedy Series
Keegan-Michael Key	Presenter of the award for Outstanding Lead Actress in a Comedy Series
Jeffrey Tambor	Presenter of a special presentation dedicated to Garry Shandling
James Corden	Presenter of the award for Outstanding Lead Actor in a Comedy Series
America Ferrera; Mandy Moore	Presenters of the award for Outstanding Reality-Competition Program
Tony Goldwyn; Kerry Washington	Presenters of the awards for Outstanding Writing for a Limited Series, Movie or Dramatic Special and Outstanding Supporting Actress in a Limited Series or Movie
Priyanka Chopra; Tom Hiddleston	Presenters of the award for Outstanding Directing for a Limited Series, Movie or Dramatic Special
Terrence Howard	Presenter of the award for Outstanding Supporting Actor in a Limited Series or Movie
Bryan Cranston; Claire Danes	Presenters of the award for Outstanding Lead Actress in a Limited Series or Movie
Tina Fey; Amy Poehler	Presenters of the award for Outstanding Lead Actor in a Limited Series or Movie
Kyle Chandler; Michelle Dockery	Presenters of the award for Outstanding Television Movie
Keri Russell; Liev Schreiber	Presenters of the award for Outstanding Limited Series
Aziz Ansari	Presenter of the award for Outstanding Writing for a Variety Special
Kit Harington; Andy Samberg	Presenters of the award for Outstanding Variety Talk Series
Laverne Cox	Presenter of the award for Outstanding Directing for a Variety Special
Damon Wayans	Presenter of the award for Outstanding Variety Sketch Series
Rami Malek; Abigail Spencer	Introducers of Outstanding Guest Actor in a Drama Series winner Hank Azaria and Outstanding Guest Actress in a Drama Series winner Margo Martindale
Hank Azaria; Margo Martindale	Presenters of the award for Outstanding Writing for a Drama Series
Minnie Driver; Michael Weatherly	Presenters of the awards for Outstanding Supporting Actress in a Drama Series and Outstanding Directing for a Drama Series
Taraji P. Henson	Presenter of the award for Outstanding Supporting Actor in a Drama Series
Henry Winkler	Presenter of the In Memoriam tribute
Allison Janney	Presenter of the award for Outstanding Lead Actor in a Drama Series
Kiefer Sutherland	Presenter of the award for Outstanding Lead Actress in a Drama Series
Larry David	Presenter of the award for Outstanding Comedy Series
Dennis Franz; Jimmy Smits	Presenters of the award for Outstanding Drama Series

=== Performers ===
Name(s)	Performed
Tori Kelly	"Hallelujah"

== In Memoriam ==
Very early on in the show, Jeffrey Tambor paid tribute to Garry Shandling. Later, before introducing the segment, Henry Winkler paid tribute to producer, actor and director Garry Marshall. Singer-songwriter Tori Kelly sang "Hallelujah" as photos were shown of television industry personalities who had died in the past year.

- Jackie Collins
- Ret Turner
- Anton Yelchin
- John Saunders
- Robert Loggia
- Ken Howard
- Morley Safer
- Doris Roberts
- Murray Weissman
- Steven Hill
- Al Molinaro
- Garry Shandling
- Kathy Fortine
- Muhammad Ali
- David Canary
- William Schallert
- Merle Haggard
- Alan Rickman
- Renee Valente
- Fred Thompson
- Abe Vigoda
- Fyvush Finkel
- Ann Morgan Guilbert
- Ian Sander
- Natalie Cole
- Sean Whitesell
- Howard West
- Noel Neill
- Jack Larson
- John McLaughlin
- David Bowie
- Arthur Hiller
- Glenn Frey
- Michael Stevens
- Dan Haggerty
- Wayne Rogers
- Patty Duke
- Alan Young
- George Kennedy
- Jon Polito
- Hugh O'Brian
- Gene Wilder
- Prince
