= Master of None =

American comedy television series

- Also known as: Master of None Presents: Moments in Love (season 3)
- Genre: Comedy drama; Romantic comedy
- Created by: Aziz Ansari; Alan Yang
- Starring: Aziz Ansari; Eric Wareheim; Noël Wells; Lena Waithe; Kelvin Yu; Alessandra Mastronardi; Naomi Ackie
- Composers: Didier Leplae; Joe Wong
- Country of origin: United States
- Original language: English
- No. of seasons: 3
- No. of episodes: 25

Production
- Executive producers: Aziz Ansari; Alan Yang; Michael Schur; Dave Becky; David Miner; Lena Waithe; Naomi Ackie
- Producer: Igor Srubshchik
- Production locations: New York City; Modena; London
- Cinematography: Mark Schwartzbard; Thimios Bakatakis
- Editors: Jennifer Lilly; Suzy Elmiger; Daniel Haworth
- Camera setup: Single-camera
- Running time: 21–57 minutes
- Production companies: Alan Yang Pictures; Oh Brudder Productions; Fremulon; 3 Arts Entertainment; Universal Television; Netflix Originals

Original release
- Network: Netflix
- Release: November 6, 2015 – May 23, 2021

Master of None is an American comedy drama television series, which was released for streaming on November 6, 2015, on Netflix. The series was created by Aziz Ansari and Alan Yang, with the first two seasons starring Ansari in the lead role of Dev Shah, a 30-year-old actor, and the third season starring Lena Waithe in the lead role of Denise, a 37-year-old lesbian novelist, mostly following their romantic, professional, and personal experiences. The first season is set in New York City, and consists of ten episodes. The second season, which takes place in Italy and New York, consists of ten episodes and was released on May 12, 2017. The third season, Moments in Love, consists of five episodes and premiered on Netflix on May 23, 2021.

Master of None has won three Emmy Awards and a Golden Globe. The series has received critical acclaim, appeared on multiple year-end top ten lists, and received multiple awards and nominations.

== Production and development ==
=== Conception ===
The show's title alludes to the phrase "Jack of all trades, master of none" and was originally suggested by Ansari. The series later incorporated a song of the same name by American band Beach House. Ansari said it took months to come up with the show's title and he and Yang did not agree on it until all of the episodes were completed.

=== Third season ===
Shortly before the premiere of the second season in April 2017, Ansari told Vulture, "I don't know if we're going to do a season three. I wouldn't be surprised if I needed a looonng [sic] break before I could come back to it. I've got to become a different guy before I write a third season, is my personal thought, I've got to get married or have a kid or something. I don't have anything else to say about being a young guy being single in New York eating food around town all the time." In July 2018, Netflix head of original content Cindy Holland expressed interest in creating a third season "when Aziz is ready."

Production began on the third season in London in early 2020, but was put on hold because of the COVID-19 pandemic. By January 2021, production resumed, with Naomi Ackie joining the cast. The five-episode season, titled Master of None Presents: Moments in Love premiered on May 23, 2021. The season focuses on Lena Waithe's character Denise, with all episodes directed by Ansari and written by Ansari and Waithe.

== Cast ==
- Aziz Ansari as Dev Shah (seasons 1–2; recurring season 3), a commercial actor whose best-known work was a Go-Gurt commercial.
- Eric Wareheim as Arnold Baumheiser (seasons 1–2), Dev's friend who Ansari describes as the "token white friend". Wareheim notes his character's friendship is based on his real-life friendship with Ansari as they both enjoy eating. The role was originally set to be played by Harris Wittels before his death in February 2015.
- Noël Wells as Rachel Silva (season 1; guest season 2), Dev's primary romantic interest in the first season. Rachel works as a music publicist.
- Lena Waithe as Denise, Dev's friend, who is a lesbian. In an Entertainment Weekly interview, Waithe said that her character was not originally intended to be African-American or gay but that Ansari wanted Denise's personality to reflect Waithe's own, so they rewrote her part.
- Kelvin Yu as Brian Chang (seasons 1–2), Dev's friend who is the son of Taiwanese immigrants. An interview with Yu in Vulture.com noted that Brian represented the "onscreen version of co-creator Alan Yang, Dev's chill, super-good-looking friend" and that he was a "hottie".
- Alessandra Mastronardi as Francesca (season 2), an Italian woman Dev befriends and later falls in love with in the second season. She later visits him in New York.
- Naomi Ackie as Alicia (season 3), Denise's wife in the third season.

Also making recurring appearances in the series are Todd Barry, who plays a movie director named Todd; Colin Salmon, who plays a fictionalized version of himself; H. Jon Benjamin as Benjamin, an acting colleague on the film The Sickening; Leonard Ouzts as Lawrence, the producer of Clash of the Cupcakes in the second season; and Ansari's real-life parents Shoukath and Fatima, who play Dev's parents. There have been guest appearances by Danielle Brooks, Ravi Patel, Claire Danes, David Krumholtz, Noah Emmerich, Bobby Cannavale, John Legend, Kym Whitley, Raven-Symoné, Riccardo Scamarcio, Clare-Hope Ashitey, and Angela Bassett.

== Episodes ==
=== Series overview ===
Season	Episodes	Originally released
1	10	November 6, 2015
2	10	May 12, 2017
Moments in Love	5	May 23, 2021

=== Season 1 (2015) ===
No. overall	No. in season	Title	Directed by	Written by	Original release date	Prod. code
1	1	"Plan B"	James Ponsoldt	Aziz Ansari & Alan Yang	November 6, 2015	101
Dev hooks up with a girl named Rachel, though their night ends awkwardly after his condom breaks during sex. Later on, Dev and his friend Arnold attend the birthday party of their friend's one-year-old son. He runs into another friend Amanda and her kids there and babysits them for a while. Already 30, he begins to wonder if he might want kids someday. In the end, he decides that for now he enjoys being childfree.
2	2	"Parents"	Aziz Ansari	Aziz Ansari & Alan Yang	November 6, 2015	102
After auditioning for a movie called The Sickening, Dev and his friend Brian discuss how their entire lives are the way they are because their immigrant parents sacrificed everything to move to America. They thank them by taking them to dinner, and discover the harshness of the lives they went through. Dev hopes that this will all help bring him and his parents closer together.
3	3	"Hot Ticket"	James Ponsoldt	Story by : Harris Wittels; Teleplay by : Aziz Ansari & Alan Yang	November 6, 2015	103
Dev gets two tickets to a secret show and starts asking girls out. Only two respond, and the one he takes, Alice, ends up being overly aggressive and a kleptomaniac, and she is kicked out of the club. He then runs into Rachel and they have a good time, but when he attempts to kiss her, she turns him down romantically, and is told that she is trying to make it work with her ex-boyfriend.
4	4	"Indians on TV"	Eric Wareheim	Aziz Ansari & Alan Yang	November 6, 2015	108
Dev runs into his friend Ravi at an audition and they discuss how the majority of roles they audition are for accented, stereotypical Indians. After auditioning for a sitcom called 3 Buddies, Dev accidentally receives an email thread from the producer saying they can cast only one Indian and includes a racist remark. The producer tries to apologize by treating Dev to a Knicks game courtside and visiting a VIP area where he meets Busta Rhymes, who tells him to leverage his position. He gets called from his agent Shannon who tells them they went with somebody else. Dev begins to involve an Indian advocacy group. However, the producer dies and the replacement producer goes with a Perfect Strangers concept.
5	5	"The Other Man"	Eric Wareheim	Joe Mande & Aniz Ansari	November 6, 2015	104
Dev's friend Denise invites him to a work party, where he meets her publication's food critic, Nina (Claire Danes). Nina is intent on having sex with him, but before they do the deed, Dev discovers she is married and backs out. After conferring with Denise and Benjamin, a fellow actor from The Sickening, they agree that an affair may be doable if she does not have kids or if the husband never finds out. However, one day when the husband (Noah Emmerich) cuts in front of him at an ice-cream store and buys and destroys the last special, Dev goes ahead with the affair. The husband eventually finds out. Weeks later Dev and Denise run into them and learn that the affair brought up several problems the couple faced, and Dev's sleeping with Nina actually saved their marriage.
6	6	"Nashville"	Aziz Ansari	Aziz Ansari & Alan Yang	November 6, 2015	105
Rachel texts Dev that she and her boyfriend have broken up, and to make their first date memorable, he asks her if she would like to fly to Nashville for a day with him. She agrees, as long as she would get home in time for her niece's recital on Sunday night. The two have a fun time together, but he takes a detour on their way to the airport and they miss their flight, and she misses her niece's recital. But she still likes him and they keep dating.
7	7	"Ladies and Gentlemen"	Lynn Shelton	Story by : Andrew Blitz; Teleplay by : Sarah Peters & Zoe Jarman	November 6, 2015	106
While working on a commercial, Dev finds out that a colleague Diana had been pursued by a man on her way home. When Dev tells Denise and Rachel about it, the women share similar experiences. Dev realizes he is privileged just by being male, and he identifies himself as a feminist. While hanging with the cast of his commercial one night, he discusses with the director that all the women in the commercial are just there for eye candy. The director revises the commercial so that all the main speaking roles are given to the women, and Dev is later removed from the ad for not being a good fit with his new role in it. Although he is disappointed, the women are thankful that he stood up for them.
8	8	"Old People"	Lynn Shelton	Aziz Ansari & Alan Yang	November 6, 2015	107
When Arnold's grandfather dies a week after Dev and Arnold visited him, Dev re-evaluates his relationship with his own grandparents and Rachel feels guilty for not visiting her own grandmother more often. Dev and Rachel visit her grandmother, but Rachel is summoned to a work emergency and Dev stays with her grandma. The two get along and he sneaks her out of her retirement home to enjoy a fancy dinner, but she escapes when he isn't looking. He and Rachel search for her, and finally find her singing at a popular jazz club.
9	9	"Mornings"	Eric Wareheim	Aziz Ansari & Alan Yang	November 6, 2015	109
Rachel moves in with Dev and the two have good times together and fall in love. But as the months pass, they start finding problems: their conflicting amounts of cleanliness; the fact that Dev hasn't told his parents that he's even seeing Rachel. Then Rachel learns that a work promotion would require her to move to Chicago for six months. She has a breakdown about whether or not she wants to keep her job. She decides to go to Chicago for the interview. At home, Dev starts using a pasta-maker she gave him when they first moved in together, and he discovers that he's great at making pasta. She returns and says she turned down the job, but her PR firm will make accommodations for her to make sure she's happy with them. Their relationship continues happily.
10	10	"Finale"	Eric Wareheim	Aziz Ansari & Alan Yang	November 6, 2015	110
Dev and Rachel attend a wedding, and Dev considers a life together, believing that if they get married, it might only be because it's the point in life that society dictates they should settle down. Dev meets his dad for advice, who asks if he really wants to be an actor, and Dev is unsure. He, Rachel, his friends, and his parents then attend The Sickening's premiere. Dev's scenes were cut from the film, and Rachel drunkenly lambasts the director's talent. Later, Dev shares with Rachel his concerns about their future and asks what their relationship's end course is if they're not 100% sure they'll be happy with each other forever. Rachel unhappily goes to stay with her friend, and a few days later informs Dev that she's moving to Tokyo to salvage the rest of her young adult life. Dev meets up with Benjamin (who was also cut from the film), and both talk about their relationships, with Benjamin opining that relationship stability can fluctuate depending upon small gestures for a lasting passion. Determined to overcome his stagnant attitude, Dev makes up his mind to move to Italy and study pasta-making at culinary school.

=== Season 2 (2017) ===
No. overall	No. in season	Title	Directed by	Written by	Original release date	Prod. code
11	1	"The Thief" (Note: The episode is a homage to the classic Italian film Bicycle Thieves directed by Vittorio De Sica.)	Aziz Ansari	Story by : Andy Blitz; Teleplay by : Aziz Ansari & Alan Yang	May 12, 2017	201
As an apprentice pasta maker in Modena, Italy, Dev has made new friends and has improved his culinary skills over the past three months, but has not quite moved on from his ex-girlfriend Rachel, who is in Japan. For his birthday, he had booked a reservation for one at a restaurant, but offers to share his table with a visiting British woman named Sara who had botched her reservation date. The two have a great day together, and Dev gets her phone number. However, his phone is stolen, so he and his pasta instructor's son try to track down the thief. They eventually spot him, but he no longer has the phone. Dev is discouraged that he may never see Sara again. After his Italian friends celebrate his birthday and present some gifts, Dev sits alone in his apartment and writes an email to Rachel.
12	2	"Le Nozze" (Note: The title "Le Nozze" is a reference to the Italian film La Notte directed by Michelangelo Antonioni.)	Aziz Ansari	Aziz Ansari & Alan Yang	May 12, 2017	202
Arnold visits Dev in Modena. After celebrating Dev's birthday with a meal at an exclusive restaurant, and talking about posting videos on singles websites, the two drive out to the countryside to attend a wedding of Arnold's friend, Ellen. However, Arnold soon reveals that the friend is his ex-girlfriend whom he dated for 11 years. Arnold breaks down when he sees that the groom physically resembles him but is shorter, and starts to antagonize him. Dev pulls him aside, the two discussing how he and Ellen are different people now, and whatever he idealized is gone. After receiving a cheerful message from another online girl, he returns to the wedding and apologizes to Ellen, who forgives him. Meanwhile, Dev, who had been texting Rachel again, tries to tell her that he thinks their messaging isn't helping either of them move on. Following the conclusion of his apprenticeship, he says goodbye to his Italian friends, and moves back to New York, where his agent gets him a gig as a host of a food competition show, Clash of the Cupcakes.
13	3	"Religion"	Alan Yang	Aziz Ansari & Aniz Adam Ansari	May 12, 2017	02007
Dev fakes being a devout Muslim while his relatives are visiting. While hanging out with his younger cousin Navid, he offers him a bite of his pork sandwich, at which Navid decides he loves pork and later wants Dev to go with him to a barbecue food festival, and they excuse themselves from Eid prayer to sneak out to attend. At a later restaurant gathering, Dev reveals that he eats pork and is not religious, but his family and relatives are in shock. His mother is upset, and does not wish to speak to him. Two weeks later, Dev's father explains that his mother tried to raise him as a Muslim, and while it's okay to follow his own religious practices, when he does it in front of mother, it makes her feel like a failure. That night, Dev skims through a copy of the Qur'an his mother gave him as a child, and texts her. They make up, coming to terms with each other's spirituality.
14	4	"First Date"	Eric Wareheim	Story by : Sarah Schneider; Teleplay by : Aziz Ansari & Alan Yang	May 12, 2017	02003
Dev meets a dozen women on a popular dating app, and he takes each one to the same restaurant and rooftop bar. His dates are of all races—and maturity levels. The women include an aspiring actress, a cocaine addict, a WWE fanatic with poor social skills, and a woman who Dev discovers is using the app trying to meet someone else while still on her date with Dev. He seems to hit it off with Priya, who is also Indian, and they joke about non-Indian people who only date Indians, which Dev labels an "Indian fetish". Later, when he is with another Indian woman named Sona, they run into her friend Patrick, a tall, handsome combat photographer who just returned from assignment in Syria. Dev feels inadequate next to Patrick, and it's apparent Sona and Patrick have feelings for each other. At the end of the night he kisses Priya, who reciprocates but politely declines his offer to go up to his apartment for a drink, since it is only their first date. He does get lucky with one of the women, Christine, who invites him back to her place. There he is shocked to find that she stores her condoms in a cookie jar that depicts a cartoonish black woman in the racist mammy archetype. Dev doesn't say anything until after they have sex, and then tells her finds it offensive. Christine is flustered and defensive at first, saying it was a gift and she didn't know it was offensive, but quickly gets angry when she realizes that Dev saw the cookie jar and thought she was a racist, but then went ahead and had sex with her anyway.
15	5	"The Dinner Party"	Eric Wareheim	Aziz Ansari & Alan Yang	May 12, 2017	02004
After hosting the Jabbawockeez on Clash of the Cupcakes, Dev is ecstatic to hang out with his Italian friend Francesca, who is in town accompanying her boyfriend on a business trip. Dev meets his show's producer, a world-renowned chef and TV host, Chef Jeff, and they hit it off. Despite consulting Arnold for good tips, Dev's second date with Priya, a girl from the previous episode, bombs. Dev takes Francesca to Chef Jeff's dinner party, and the two run into Dev's friend Ravi. John Legend performs as a featured guest. Dev and Francesca have a good time, and later Dev is pulled aside by Jeff, who sees clearly that Dev likes her. Dev does not act on his feelings, and says goodbye to Francesca later that night, who is leaving back for Italy.
16	6	"New York, I Love You"	Alan Yang	Story by : Cord Jefferson; Teleplay by : Aziz Ansari & Alan Yang	May 12, 2017	02008
Dev, Denise, and Arnold are on their way to see the hit new movie Death Castle. The intersecting lives of different New Yorkers are shown. A doorman named Eddie must juggle favors for his apartment's residents, eventually standing up for himself against a tenant who wanted him to hide his affair. His friend goes to a convenience store, where a deaf girl named Maya is struggling with her sex life. She eventually tells her boyfriend she wants to receive oral sex more often. She and her boyfriend discuss it and get into a cab. In the next cab, two women spoil Death Castle for their driver Samuel, a Burundian immigrant. That night, Samuel and his roommates find no clubs to go to on their night out. They eventually find some women trying to get into their other roommate's fast food place. Samuel convinces him to let them all in, and the group has a good time. The women don't wish to end the night there, so they all go to see Death Castle together, where all the characters in the episode are watching the film, with Samuel happening to sit next to Dev.
17	7	"Door #3"	Melina Matsoukas	Story by : Lakshmi Sundaram; Teleplay by : Aziz Ansari & Alan Yang	May 12, 2017	02005
Jeff informs Dev that the network wishes to lock him down for a seven-season Clash of the Cupcakes contract. Dev wants to think about it, as he is not passionate about the show. Meanwhile, Brian's dad begins dating two women. When Brian asks how he can do that, he tells Brian and Arnold that the two women are alright with it, as old people like him are lonely. Dev visits his dad in the hospital he works at, and later the guest-judge on Clash injures himself while doing a magic trick. Dev sits down with Jeff, and tells him he wishes to quit Clash, but pitches a show called BFFs: Best Food Friends, where he and Jeff travel around the world together tasting foods and immersing themselves in cultures. Jeff loves it, and gets it greenlit. When Dev Skypes Francesca to tell her the news, she tells Dev that she is engaged. Brian's dad tells his son both women have broken up with him, and he gets a dog.
18	8	"Thanksgiving"	Melina Matsoukas	Aziz Ansari & Lena Waithe	May 12, 2017	208
As Dev's family does not celebrate Thanksgiving, he has spent it with Denise's family for years, the two being childhood friends. In 1995, 12-year-old Denise begins to realize she is attracted to women. On Thanksgiving 1999, she comes out to Dev. When he asks why she is nervous to tell her family, she says LGBT issues are touchy in black families. In 2006, Denise comes out to her mother Catherine (Angela Bassett). Catherine asks her sister Joyce if this is her fault. On Thanksgiving 2015, Denise brings her girlfriend Michelle. Denise and Joyce are obviously annoyed, and attempt to hide the fact that Denise is gay from her grandma, Ernestine. The next year, Denise brings home a superficial girl named Nikki. After dinner, Dev talks with Catherine and Joyce. Catherine admits that while she does struggle with embracing her daughter's sexuality, she still wishes for Denise to end up with a nice woman, and misses Michelle. Finally, on Thanksgiving in 2017, Denise and Michelle are dating again. Joyce and Ernestine are happy to see her. Michelle and Catherine talk alone, and Catherine admits to Denise she is happy the two of them are together. Denise, Catherine, Joyce, Ernestine, Dev, and Michelle have a wonderful dinner, and happily say grace together.
19	9	"Amarsi Un Po'" (Note: The title is a reference to the song of the same name (which means "loving each other a little") by Lucio Battisti. Battisti released an English version of the single for international markets, with the song renamed "To Feel in Love".)	Aziz Ansari	Aziz Ansari	May 12, 2017	02009
Francesca visits for the month, and wants to spend time with Dev. The two spend so much time together, and Dev asks Arnold if he should confess his feelings for her. He believes she feels the same way, but she is still engaged. At one point, the two spend the night at his place because of a blizzard, and she asks to share his bed, but nothing happens. At a party, Francesca seems absent, and Dev asks her what's wrong. She insists it is nothing, and admits this situation is difficult for both of them. She then gets into an argument with her fiancé, Pino, where she confesses that she does not wish to leave New York. On one of her final days there, Dev reveals that he is in love with her. She tells him that she is in love with him too, and asks for time so she can figure out what to do.
20	10	"Buona Notte" (Note: The title means good night in Italian.)	Aziz Ansari	Aziz Ansari & Alan Yang	May 12, 2017	02010
While filming BFFs, Dev discovers that his former makeup artist Lisa had quit the show because she and other women were sexually harassed by Jeff. Although advised to keep quiet, Dev becomes noticeably bothered by the news during their guest spot on the talk show Raven Live!, starring Raven-Symoné. When Raven learns of the news through social media, she confronts Jeff, who walks off the set, and condemns Dev, who inadvertently stated that he condones the behavior. Dev talks with Francesca about their relationship, but Francesca is hesitant about breaking up her engagement and she eventually leaves without any explanation for the future of their relationship. On the way to ask Arnold what to do, Dev runs into Rachel and they briefly exchange pleasantries. At home, Dev wonders if a relationship with Francesca would ever be possible, while Francesca ponders the same as she packs her bags. The final scene shows Francesca and Dev lying next to each other in bed, the former no longer wearing her engagement ring.

=== Season 3: Master of None Presents: Moments in Love (2021) ===
No. overall	No. in season	Title	Directed by	Written by	Original release date
21	1	"Moments in Love, Chapter 1"	Aziz Ansari	Aziz Ansari & Lena Waithe	May 23, 2021
Denise and her new wife Alicia are settled in a lovely 150-year-old house in Upstate New York. Denise has become a successful author while Alicia works in an antique store. They invite Dev and his new girlfriend Reshmi over, but Dev and Reshmi end up having an ugly fight that makes everyone feel sad. It is revealed that Dev's acting career seems to be over, that he and Reshmi moved into her parents' home to save money and that, after being asked to leave, they are now living at Dev's parents' house. Dev also feels Denise traded him in for newer friends. Alicia wants to have a baby, and manages to have a successful insemination with Denise's cousin Darius. However, the pregnancy ends in a miscarriage, and Alicia is angry at Denise because she knows that Denise only went along with the pregnancy out of a sense of duty and not really wanting a baby.
22	2	"Moments in Love, Chapter 2"	Aziz Ansari	Aziz Ansari & Lena Waithe	May 23, 2021
While Alicia is out of town attending an antique show in Baltimore, Denise invites an old flame over. They end up sleeping together and, while Denise drives her home, they are involved in a vehicular collision. Alicia drives all the way back to see Denise in hospital and then discovers the affair. When Alicia angrily tells Denise that she raced in from Baltimore at 4 a.m. to comfort her cheating wife at 5 a.m., Denise figures out that Alicia was not in Baltimore at all because it is 5 hours from the hospital instead of just 1 hour. Alicia then admits she was sleeping with another woman and that it wasn't a fling. The two women fight about the future of their relationship and decide to divorce.
23	3	"Moments in Love, Chapter 3"	Aziz Ansari	Aziz Ansari & Lena Waithe	May 23, 2021
Denise and Alicia move out of their house, after Denise tries to reconcile but Alicia determines that there is too much baggage between them. Dev and Denise mend fences about their failures in their respective creative careers. The episode ends with Denise packing up the house and moving out, as the house has been purchased by another couple.
24	4	"Moments in Love, Chapter 4"	Aziz Ansari	Aziz Ansari & Lena Waithe	May 23, 2021
Three years after the events of Chapter 3, Alicia discusses the possibility of being a single mother and the grueling process of getting pregnant at her age at a nearby fertility center. Her first round of IVF shots do not go well, as they only produce a fragmented embryo that can't be implanted. Her mother consoles her through her efforts and with a renewed spirit she tries again with a determination to be a "bad bitch" and get the job done. The episode ends with Alicia being ecstatic after being informed about her pregnancy.
25	5	"Moments in Love, Chapter 5"	Aziz Ansari	Aziz Ansari & Lena Waithe	May 23, 2021
A few years after Chapter 4, both Alicia and Denise are married to other women and have children of their own, though Alicia's loving and supportive grandmother has died. They Airbnb their old house in upstate New York and bond over Denise's new office job, Alicia's new Antique business, and their love for their own children. They have a nice night and realize that they remain well-matched. The story ends with Denise looking at the old house from outside with a thoughtful expression.

== Soundtrack ==
Pitchfork noted season two for its feature of "some great music". David Bowie, Kraftwerk, D'Angelo, Tupac Shakur, Digable Planets, and Vengaboys are some of the artists featured throughout the season's episodes. The show also features a performance from John Legend covering a Michael Jackson song, "I Can't Help It", and Italian music to match the show's early setting in Italy, including Ryan Paris and "Scatman (Ski-Ba-Bop-Ba-Dop-Bop)" as a minor plotline.

== Influences ==
In Season 2 of Master of None critics noted some distinct influences on the show. In the opening of the episode "The Thief", a stack of DVDs from The Criterion Collection on Dev's (Aziz Ansari) bed can be seen:

- Federico Fellini's La Dolce Vita (1960), 8½ (1963), and Amarcord (1973)
- Vittorio De Sica's Bicycle Thieves (1948)
- Michelangelo Antonioni's L'Avventura (1960) and La Notte (1961)

In Vulture, it is noted that Master of None references classic Italian films and films of the French New Wave throughout the second season. They also cited the films of Woody Allen as a strong influence. They noted, "It's almost impossible for any filmmaker to tell a New York-set story about romance, career, and culture without aping Woody Allen". In particular they describe Dev and Francesca's "walk and talk romance", and "trips to museums as a recall to Allen's Isaac and Diane Keaton's Mary in Manhattan (1979)". They also compare Dev's trying to connect in the dating scene as reminiscent of Alvy Singer's failed attempts to replace his ex-girlfriend in Annie Hall (1977). They also cited the mere casting of Alessandra Mastronardi who plays Francesca but who was also in Allen's 2012 film To Rome with Love.

Slate also noted other references on the show, where the plot and directorial choices of the episode "The Thief" in particular seems to be heavily influenced by Bicycle Thieves. Other references mentioned included ones from the episode "Amarsi Un Po" which include the dancing scene between Dev and Francesca is a reference to the dancing scene in 8 1/2. The kissing through glass in "Buona Notte" is a direct reference to a scene in L'Eclisse. Dev and Francesca also specifically watch L'Avventura in his apartment.

Critics have also noted Spike Lee's influence on the show especially in the "Thanksgiving" episode. Wong Kar-wai's 2000 film In the Mood for Love has been selected by critics as one ripe for comparison with Master of None. In particular the episode "Buona Notte" "where would-be lovers express their feelings for each other through gestures and furtive touches instead of full-on physical contact."

== Reception ==
=== Critical response ===
Critical response of Master of None
Season	Rotten Tomatoes	Metacritic
1	100% (67 reviews)	91 (31 reviews)
2	100% (62 reviews)	91 (24 reviews)
3	82% (44 reviews)	75 (18 reviews)

==== Season 1 ====
On Rotten Tomatoes, the first season holds an approval rating of 100% based on 67 reviews, with an average rating of 9/10. The site's critical consensus reads, "Exceptionally executed with charm, humor, and heart, Master of None is a refreshingly offbeat take on a familiar premise." On Metacritic, the season has a score of 91 out of 100, based on 31 critics, indicating "universal acclaim".

James Poniewozik of The New York Times called it "the year's best comedy straight out of the gate" and a "mature rom-com." IGN's Matt Fowler gave the entire first season an 8.8 out of 10, saying "by the second episode it takes flight and offers up a very funny, unique take on food, dating, relationships, etc (the usual suspects). Ansari is a smart and engaging presence and his perspective on things lends itself very well to this type of single-camera comedy. And his supporting cast, particularly Wells, is on point. A few episodes may have fizzled out right at the finish...but there's no denying Master of None's success overall." James Dempsey of Newstalk described the show as "like a transatlantic cousin of Ricky Gervais' Extras, another story of an actor navigating show business and his personal life. But whereas that show relied heavily on stunt cameos of Hollywood actors playing pantomime versions of themselves—along with painfully blunt awkwardness that attempts to wring every possible laugh out of increasingly cringe comedy—Master of None is content and confident to let the viewer warm to it entirely on its terms. And it's all the better for it."

==== Season 2 ====
On Rotten Tomatoes, the second season also holds an approval rating of 100% based on 62 reviews, with an average rating of 8.8/10. The site's critical consensus reads, "Master of None's second season picks up where its predecessor left off, delivering an ambitious batch of episodes that builds on the show's premise while adding surprising twists." On Metacritic, the season has a score of 91 out of 100, based on 24 critics, indicating "universal acclaim".

==== Season 3 ====
On Rotten Tomatoes, the third season holds an approval rating of 82% based on 44 reviews, with an average rating of 7.7/10. The site's critical consensus reads, "Anchored by powerful performances from Lena Waithe and Naomi Ackie, Moments in Love is undeniably slow TV, but patient viewers will be rewarded with a surprising and mature season that wears its cinematic inspirations on its sleeve." On Metacritic, the season has a score of 75 out of 100, based on 18 critics, indicating "generally favorable reviews".

=== Top ten lists ===
Master of None was included on many lists of best TV shows of 2015. Jaime Lutz from Time Out New York called it the best TV show of 2015. In addition, it was awarded the runner-up position by Matthew Gilbert from The Boston Globe, Mark Peikert from TheWrap, and Paste. Master of None was also ranked as one of the top 10 shows of the year by many publications, including Complex, Entertainment Weekly, Film School Rejects, The Guardian, IGN, Los Angeles Times, The New York Times, People, TIME, TV Guide, Vanity Fair, Variety, Vogue, and The Washington Post. In 2018, TV Guide listed the "Thanksgiving" episode as number 10 in their "TV Guide's 65 Best Episodes of the 21st Century" issue.

=== Accolades ===
Year	Award	Category	Nominee(s)	Result	Ref.
2015	American Film Institute Awards	Top 10 TV Programs of the Year	Master of None	Won	
2016	Critics' Choice Television Awards	Best Comedy Series	Master of None	Won	
2016	Critics' Choice Television Awards	Best Actor in a Comedy Series	Aziz Ansari	Nominated	
2016	Golden Globe Awards	Best Actor in a Television Series – Musical or Comedy	Aziz Ansari	Nominated	
2016	Dorian Awards	TV Comedy of the Year	Master of None	Nominated	
2016	NAACP Image Awards	Outstanding Writing in a Comedy Series	Aziz Ansari & Alan Yang	Nominated	
2016	NAACP Image Awards	Outstanding Directing in a Comedy Series	Aziz Ansari	Nominated	
2016	Peabody Awards	Entertainment and children's programming honorees	Master of None	Won	
2016	GLAAD Media Awards	Outstanding Comedy Series	Master of None	Nominated	
2016	TCA Awards	Outstanding Achievement in Comedy	Master of None	Nominated	
2016	TCA Awards	Outstanding New Program	Master of None	Nominated	
2016	TCA Awards	Individual Achievement in Comedy	Aziz Ansari	Nominated	
2016	Primetime Emmy Awards	Outstanding Comedy Series	Master of None	Nominated	
2016	Primetime Emmy Awards	Outstanding Lead Actor in a Comedy Series	Aziz Ansari	Nominated	
2016	Primetime Emmy Awards	Outstanding Directing for a Comedy Series	Aziz Ansari for "Parents"	Nominated	
2016	Primetime Emmy Awards	Outstanding Writing for a Comedy Series	Aziz Ansari & Alan Yang for "Parents"	Won	
2016	Gotham Awards	Breakthrough Series – Long Form	Master of None	Nominated	
2017
2017	Television Critics Association Awards	Outstanding Achievement in Comedy	Master of None	Nominated	
2017	Television Critics Association Awards	Individual Achievement in Comedy	Aziz Ansari	Nominated	
2017	Primetime Emmy Awards	Outstanding Comedy Series	Master of None	Nominated	
2017	Primetime Emmy Awards	Outstanding Lead Actor in a Comedy Series	Aziz Ansari	Nominated	
2017	Primetime Emmy Awards	Outstanding Writing for a Comedy Series	Aziz Ansari & Lena Waithe for "Thanksgiving"	Won	
2017	Primetime Creative Arts Emmy Awards	Outstanding Guest Actress in a Comedy Series	Angela Bassett (for "Thanksgiving")	Nominated	
2017	Primetime Creative Arts Emmy Awards	Outstanding Casting for a Comedy Series	Cody Beke & Teresa Razzauti	Nominated	
2017	Primetime Creative Arts Emmy Awards	Outstanding Music Supervision	Zach Cowie & Kerri Drootin (for "Amarsi Un Po'")	Nominated	
2017	Primetime Creative Arts Emmy Awards	Outstanding Single-Camera Picture Editing for a Comedy Series	Jennifer Lilly (for "The Thief")	Won	
2017	Primetime Creative Arts Emmy Awards	Outstanding Sound Mixing for a Comedy or Drama Series (Half-Hour) and Animation	Joshua Berger & Michael Barosky (for "The Dinner Party")	Nominated	
2017	Hollywood Music in Media Awards	Outstanding Music Supervision – Television	Zach Cowie and Kerri Drootin	Nominated	
2017	American Film Institute Awards	Top 10 TV Programs of the Year	Master of None	Won	
2018	Critics' Choice Television Awards	Best Actor in a Comedy Series	Aziz Ansari	Nominated	
2018	Critics' Choice Television Awards	Best Supporting Actress in a Comedy Series	Alessandra Mastronardi	Nominated	
2018	Golden Globe Awards	Best Television Series – Musical or Comedy	Master of None	Nominated	
2018	Golden Globe Awards	Best Actor in a Television Series – Musical or Comedy	Aziz Ansari	Won	
2018	Guild of Music Supervisors Awards	Best Music Supervision in a Television Comedy or Musical	Zach Cowie & Kerri Drootin	Nominated	
2021	Black Reel Awards	Outstanding Supporting Actress, Comedy Series	Naomi Ackie	Nominated	
