= Dang! (TV series) =

American adult animated television series

- Genre: Animated sitcom
- Created by: Andrew Law
- Voices of: Stephanie Hsu; Andrew Law; Poppy Liu
- Music by: Leo Birenberg
- Country of origin: United States
- Original language: English
- No. of seasons: 1
- No. of episodes: 8

Production
- Executive producers: Andrew Law; Matt Murray; Alan Yang; Michael Schur; David Miner; Chris Prynoski; Shannon Prynoski; Antonio Canobbio; Ben Kalina
- Running time: 25–27 minutes
- Production companies: Rodeoscope; Panther Co.; 3 Arts Entertainment; Fremulon; Titmouse, Inc.; Alan Yang Pictures; Universal Television; Netflix Animation Studios

Original release
- Network: Netflix
- Release: September 8, 2026

Dang! is an American animated sitcom created by Andrew Law for Netflix. Stephanie Hsu, Law, and Poppy Liu voice the Dang siblings, Chinese-American young adults living in New York City and members of a dysfunctional family. The series explores the relationship between the siblings, their coming-of-age as young professionals, and the Asian-American experience. The series premiered on September 8, 2026.

== Premise ==
Chinese Americans adult siblings Andrew and Eunice Dang, originally from Boston, live together in New York City. In the first episode, Andrew is fired from his job, while Eunice attempts to get an unpaid internship. Eldest sister Ruthie, though not close with them, visits New York because she is, unbeknownst to her siblings, pregnant and recently separated from her husband. The siblings bond based on their shared mistakes, and Ruthie decides to move from Boston to New York as well.

== Cast and characters ==
=== Main ===
- Stephanie Hsu as Ruthie Dang, a condescending, hypocritical, high-powered corporate attorney and the eldest child of the Dang family. Ruthie cheated on her husband Warren with a married man named Peter, and is pregnant with Peter's child.
- Andrew Law as Andrew Dang, the recently demoted co-founder of a streetwear e-commerce startup and the anxious middle child of the Dang family. He is gay and has had many hookups with men. Andrew also suffers IBS with certain foods.
- Poppy Liu as Eunice Dang, an unpaid intern and the narcissistic youngest child of the Dang family. She is also a streamer of pornographic foot fetish content.

=== Recurring ===
- Edi Patterson as Jane Atkinson, Eunice's boss.
- Noël Wells as Greta, an executive assistant and Eunice's co-worker.
- SungWon Cho as Peter, a married man who Ruthie cheats with due to being attracted to Peter's condescending personality. Peter is also the father of Ruthie's child.
- Al Roberts as Warren, Ruthie’s ex-husband from England.

== Episodes ==
All episodes are directed by Anthony Chun.

No.	Title	Written by	Original release date
1	"Pilot"	Andrew Law	September 8, 2026
2	"Derek Equinox Bathroom"	Chris Schleicher	September 8, 2026
3	"The Davenport School for Fancy Boys"	Sabrina Wu	September 8, 2026
4	"The Hottest Old People on Earth"	Taryn Englehart	September 8, 2026
5	"Hogslut Rodeo"	Jennifer Kim	September 8, 2026
6	"The Milking Room"	Matt Murray	September 8, 2026
7	"Oh No! I'm Still Talking"	Samantha Riley	September 8, 2026
8	"Westerham"	Lawrence Dai	September 8, 2026

== Production ==
=== Development ===
The show was first developed by Law as a live-action project while working as a writer on The Good Place, where Law also met Dang! co-showrunner Matt Murray and executive producers Alan Yang and Michael Schur. Law revised the script for animation in response to feedback from Netflix, started a writers room in 2023, and received the greenlight for production from Netflix in 2024. Besides Schur, Law, Murray and Yang, producers include David Miner for 3 Arts Entertainment, Chris and Shannon Prynoski and Ben Kalina, and Antonio Cannobio for Titmouse, Inc., who provided animation services in partnership with the Korean studio Yearim.

== Release ==
The series premiered on September 8, 2026, on Netflix.

== Reception ==
=== Critical reception ===
On review aggregator Rotten Tomatoes, the first season holds an approval rating of 86% based on 7 reviews. On Metacritic, it has a weighted average score of 63 out of 100 on the reviews of 5 critics, indicating "general favorab[ility]".

Online feedback to the show's promotional campaign criticized the show for its use of Asian-American stereotypes, though it has received a generally positive critical reception since its premiere.

Matt Maytum of NME praised the show for its animation and premise, while finding fault with the series' joke writing and characterization of its leads. Yvonne Abraham of the Boston Globe described Andrew as well-characterized, but found Eunice and Ruthie to be less so.
