= Alan Yang =

American showrunner and filmmaker (born 1983)

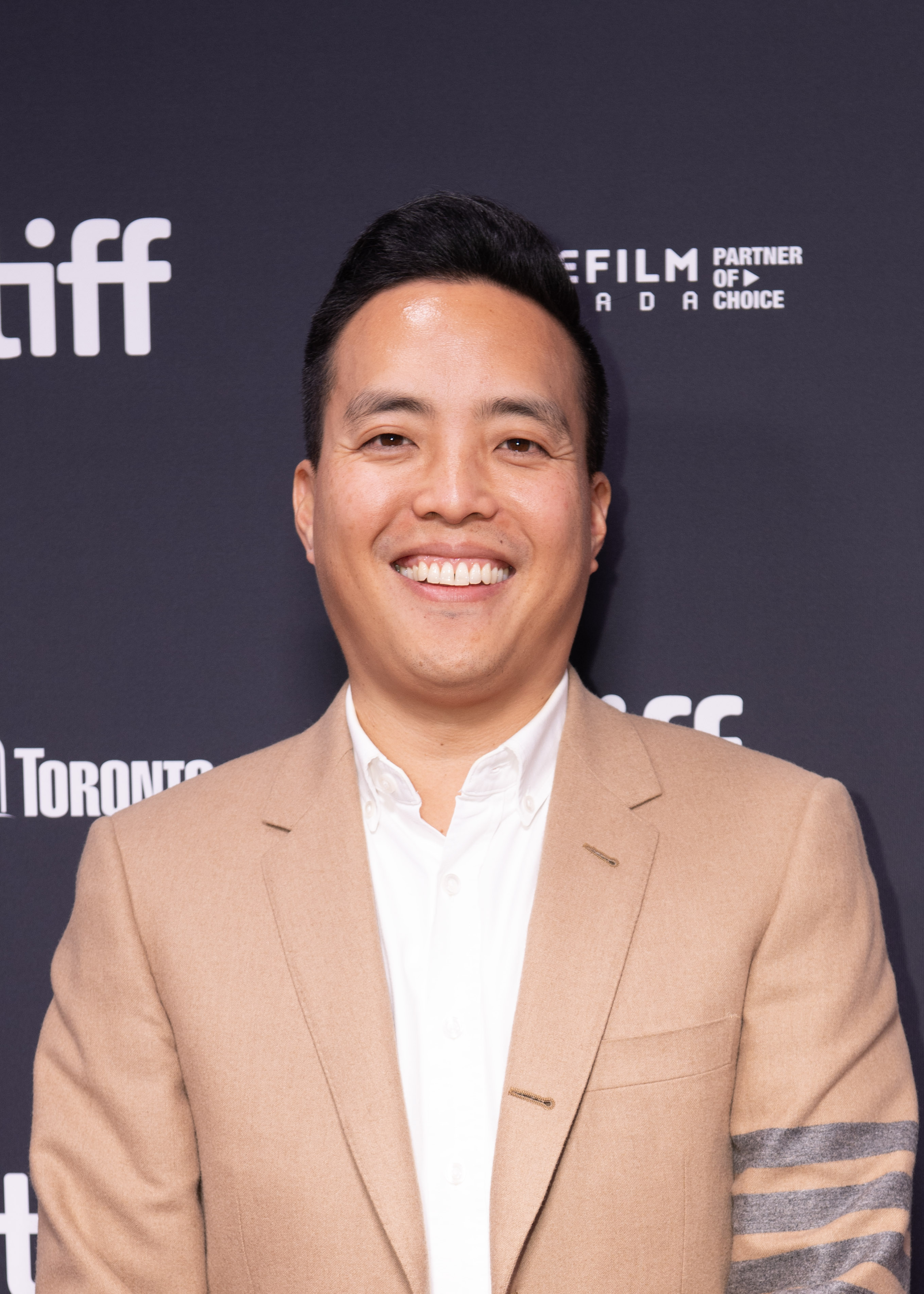
- Yang at the 2025 Toronto International Film Festival
- Born: Alan Michael Yang; August 22, 1983 (age 43); Riverside, California, US
- Education: Harvard University (BA)
- Occupations: Screenwriter; producer; director; actor
- Known for: Parks and Recreation, Master of None, Tigertail, Forever, Loot, Dang!
- Spouse: Christine Ko

Chinese name
- Traditional Chinese: 楊維榕
- Simplified Chinese: 杨维榕
Transcriptions
Standard Mandarin
- Hanyu Pinyin: Yáng Wéiróng

Alan Michael Yang (Chinese: 楊維榕; pinyin: Yáng Wéiróng; born August 22, 1983) is an American screenwriter, producer and director. He wrote and produced for the NBC sitcom Parks and Recreation, for which he received his first Emmy nomination. With Aziz Ansari, Yang co-created the Netflix series Master of None, which won a Peabody Award. At the 68th Emmy Awards in 2016, Yang and Ansari became the first writers of Asian descent to win the Emmy for Outstanding Writing for a Comedy Series for Master of None, which was also nominated for Outstanding Comedy Series. In 2018, Yang co-created the Amazon Video series Forever, and in 2022 he co-created Loot for Apple TV +.

== Early life and education ==
Yang was born and raised in Southern California. His parents immigrated from Taiwan. His father was a physician, and his mother was a high school math teacher. Yang attended Riverside Poly High School in Riverside, California.

Yang earned a degree in biology from Harvard University and wrote for The Harvard Lampoon, where he first began doing comedy. In college, Yang began following the Boston Red Sox, which led to writing for "Fire Joe Morgan," a sports journalism blog, under the pseudonym "Junior" alongside Michael Schur, a producer and writer for The Office at the time. The two later worked together on Parks and Recreation and The Good Place.

== Career ==
=== Writing ===
In 2009, Variety magazine named Yang one of "10 Screenwriters to Watch." He worked on Last Call with Carson Daly and South Park before becoming a staff writer for the NBC comedy Parks and Recreation. During the six months before that job, he wrote two screenplays, White Dad and Gay Dude. White Dad was sold to Sony in 2008, and Gay Dude made the Hollywood blacklist before being sold to Lionsgate Films in 2011 and released in 2014 as Date and Switch, starring Nicholas Braun and Dakota Johnson.

In 2012, Yang started writing a sitcom about a father-son relationship. When Parks and Rec producer Greg Daniels suggested he make the characters Asian, Yang declined as he assumed it would not be successful. On Parks and Recreation, Yang became friends with actor/comedian Aziz Ansari, and the two later co-created Master of None, which was well received—especially for its diverse cast and subject matter—and earned four Emmy nominations. Yang and Ansari won the Emmy for Outstanding Writing for a Comedy Series for their Master of None episode, "Parents." According to Yang, the episode was largely "based on my dad, Aziz's dad, and our families in general. A lot of that stuff was written as conversations that Aziz and I would have." Yang and Ansari were also awarded a Peabody Award in May 2016.

While topics included racial diversity and racism, the show strived to be authentic to life experiences. "We try to do a blend in our show of what we talk about in our real lives," he told Variety in June 2016. "There's an episode or two about being Indian or Asian on TV, about dealing with your parents who are immigrants — but we fall in love, we have work trouble, we have all these other stories that make the characters more well rounded."

In 2016, Yang wrote the second episode of The Good Place and directed an episode in the show's second season.

In 2018, he reunited with Matt Hubbard, who worked on Parks and Recreation with Yang, to create Amazon's Forever, a comedy-drama series starring Fred Armisen and Maya Rudolph. Yang and Hubbard collaborated again in 2022, co-creating Loot for Apple TV +, also starring Maya Rudolph.

=== Directing and producing ===
For Parks and Recreation, Yang directed two episodes: "New Beginnings" (2014) (Season 6, Episode 11) and "Swing Vote" (2013) (Season 5, Episode 21). He also occasionally appeared as the bassist of Andy's band, Mouse Rat.

In 2017, Yang directed the Jay-Z music video "Moonlight," which depicted the show Friends with an all-Black cast.

He was as an executive producer for Master of None, a co-executive producer, supervising producer, producer and co-producer on Parks and Recreation, an executive producer on Date and Switch (2014), a consulting producer on South Park (the episode "Miss Teacher Bangs A Boy" (2006)), a producer on the Funny or Die short Parks and Recreation is the Wu Tang of Comedy (2010), and as an associate producer on Last Call with Carson Daly. He served as a consultant for the 2007 MTV Movie Awards.

Yang co-created and executive produced the Amazon series Forever, which is a drama/comedy about a married couple and their adventures in Riverside, California, Yang's hometown. Yang was also an executive producer of Little America, a show he describes as "like Black Mirror, but instead of being super-dark sci-fi stories, it is immigrant stories."

=== Other work ===
He is friends with chef David Chang and was featured in the Netflix non-fiction original series Ugly Delicious episode "Fried Rice," where he discussed Chinese cuisine. On November 29, 2020, Yang served as David Chang's expert lifeline on Who Wants to Be a Millionaire and helped Chang become the first celebrity to win the $1,000,000 top prize for the Southern Smoke Foundation charity, along with Mina Kimes, Chang's phone-a-friend lifeline.

== Personal life ==
Yang is married to actress Christine Ko.

== Filmography ==
=== Film ===
Year	Title	Credited as			Notes
Year	Title	Director	Writer	Producer	Notes
2014	Date and Switch	No	Yes	Yes	Executive producer
2016	We Love You	No	Yes	No	
2020	Tigertail	Yes	Yes	Yes	
2025	Good Fortune	No	No	Yes	Post-production

=== Television ===
Year	Title	Credited as			Notes
Year	Title	Director	Writer	Producer	Notes
2009	Last Call with Carson Daly	No	Yes	Yes	
2009–2015	Parks and Recreation	Yes	Yes	Yes	Writer (16 episodes), director (2 episodes)
2016	The Good Place	Yes	Yes	Yes	Writer (1 episode), director (1 episode)
2015–2021	Master of None	Yes	Yes	Yes	Co-creator; writer (10 episodes), director (2 episodes)
2018	Forever	Yes	Yes	Yes	Co-creator; writer (4 episodes), director (4 episodes)
2020–2022	Little America	No	No	Yes	Executive producer
2022–present	Loot	Yes	Yes	Yes	Co-creator; writer (5 episodes), director (5 episodes)
2026	Dang!	No	No	Yes	Executive producer

== Awards ==
Year	Award	Award category	Nominated work	Result
2012	WGA Award	Comedy Series	Parks and Recreation	Nominated
2013	WGA Award	Comedy Series	Parks and Recreation	Nominated
2013	WGA Award	Episodic Comedy	Parks and Recreation	Nominated
2014	American Comedy Awards	Best Comedy Writing - TV	Parks and Recreation	Nominated
2015	Primetime Emmy	Outstanding Comedy Series	Parks and Recreation	Nominated
2016	Primetime Emmy	Outstanding Comedy Series	Master of None	Nominated
2016	Primetime Emmy	Outstanding Writing for a Comedy Series	Master of None	Won
2016	Gotham Independent Film Awards	Breakthrough Series – Long Form	Master of None	Nominated
2016	NAACP Image Awards	Outstanding Writing in a Comedy Series	Master of None	Nominated
2017	Gold Derby Awards	Best Comedy Episode of the Year	Master of None	Won
2017	Primetime Emmy	Outstanding Comedy Series	Master of None	Nominated
2017	Producers Guild of America	Best Episodic Comedy	Master of None	Nominated
2018	WGA Award	Comedy Series	Master of None	Nominated
2019	WGA Award	Episodic Comedy	Forever	Nominated
