= Fire Joe Morgan =

Sports journalism criticism blog

- Website type: Blog
- Creators: Michael Schur, Alan Yang, Dave King
- Website: www.firejoemorgan.com
- Commercial: No
- Launched: April 28, 2005
- Current status: Discontinued, with occasional guest posts from Deadspin

Fire Joe Morgan was a sports journalism criticism blog which focused primarily on baseball. It was updated regularly from 2005 through 2008. Although sports commentator Joe Morgan was often criticized, the site did not target him exclusively, but rather criticized anything the writers considered to be ignorant journalism as a whole. The blog's slogan was "Where Bad Sports Journalism Comes to Die." The blog usually used a format known as fisking.

The website officially announced its discontinuation in November 2008. Although the website is no longer updated, its archives are still available. The blog had what was to be a one-day reprise on September 16, 2009, when Deadspin invited the authors to guest post. The authors guest posted again on Deadspin on September 22, 2010.

In 2016, Fire Joe Morgan was assessed as being "on the right side of history" and "very, very funny" by Slate. Upon Joe Morgan's passing in 2020, the authors noted their regret about the blog's name. That same year, the authors held a reunion.

== Background ==
The website was founded by a group of friends in April 2005. Its sole purpose, according to Michael Schur, one of the founders, was to "make each other laugh." The website championed the statistical analysis of baseball in the tradition of Bill James, often using sabermetrics to support its arguments. Sports writers who published works misstating the concepts of the book Moneyball were a common target. The blog quickly grew in popularity, and was featured in an SI.com piece within its first year of existence. The site's authors initially kept their identities hidden using the pseudonyms Ken Tremendous, Junior, and dak, but in February 2008 revealed themselves to be TV writers Michael Schur, Alan Yang, and Dave King respectively. The three met as staff members of the Harvard Lampoon and Schur and Yang both wrote for the television show Parks and Recreation. As of season 4, King also worked for Parks and Recreation. King is also a writer for Comedy Central's Workaholics.

== Mainstream recognition ==
From 2006 on, the website grew in popularity to the point where its name could be seen in newspaper sports sections and heard on the air during sports radio broadcasts. In 2007, users of the site bustedcoverage.com voted Fire Joe Morgan the best sports blog of the year, beating sites including Deadspin and MetsBlog in the contest. Former Deadspin editor Will Leitch called Schur "one of our favorite sports bloggers."

Several major newspapers and magazines, including The New York Times, The Boston Globe, and New York magazine reported on the site's closing. Sports Illustrated named Fire Joe Morgan one of the five most influential sports blogs of the decade in December 2009.
