= Assistance (play) =

2008 play by Leslye Headland

Assistance (2008) is a play written by Leslye Headland which depicts the workplace of the world-renowned Daniel Weisinger (likely based on Harvey Weinstein, for whom Headland worked as an assistant). Because of Weisinger's overpowering and often illogical nature, the workers quickly learn that their salary and aspirations of promotion come at a heavy cost. Under Weisinger, the characters must switch from "being human...to being assistants." The play is the third installment of Headland's "Seven Deadly Sins" plays. The series includes Cinephillia (lust), Bachelorette (gluttony), Assistance (greed), Surfer Girl (sloth), Reverb (wrath), The Accidental Blonde (envy), and Cult of Love (pride). Headland wrote and directed the 2012 film version of Bachelorette. Dramatists Play Service published Assistance in June 2013.

== Summary ==
=== Scene One ===
At 8 PM, Nick and Vince, two men in their mid-to-late 20s, assist mogul Daniel Weisinger in his hectic Manhattan office building. Their disorganized antechamber, filled with folders and constantly ringing phones, is adjacent to Weisinger's luxurious office. Nick and Vince answer calls while mocking Daniel behind his back. Vince will soon leave the office; he is being promoted to director. The woman taking his place is called Nora. Nick and Nora have an awkward encounter. After messing up on her first day by putting Daniel on hold, Nick takes the brunt of his boss's insults.

=== Interlude – Vince ===
Vince expresses his sexual desire to an anonymous person on the phone. He goes to extremes to show how excited and confident he is towards his post-promotion identity. His motto is “Better to look good than feel good.”

=== Scene Two ===
At 11 PM, Nick and Nora type and answer calls. The two assistants discuss how Daniel makes his assistants “borderline suicidal.” They then receive a call from assistant Heather, who is out running errands. Heather is having trouble ordering books for Daniel and is unsure whether she can take off from work for her uncle's funeral. Heather does not want Daniel to think that she is not “committed enough” and that by giving up the funeral, it would prove that she is fully committed. Justin is in Chicago with Daniel, and requests constantly bombard him. Justin threatens to come back, but Nora convinces him to stay because she does not want to have to go with Daniel. Heather then comes up with the plan that she will deliver the books to Daniel right before she goes to the funeral. Nick follows up by yelling at Nora and saying, “Don't do HEATHER'S JOB!! Do YOUR job!!” Daniel then calls asking about the credit card. Taking Nick's advice, Nora throws Heather under the bus by stating, “It's Heather. It was her job...It wasn't me.” Heather is fired and Nick tells her that it was “because of the funeral.” Nick and Nora proceed into Daniel's office together and close the door.

=== Interlude – Heather ===
Heather calls her mother and waits for a train. Heather gets stressed out and reveals that her ultimate goal was to be successful, “BECAUSE I WANTED YOU TO BE PROUD OF ME! BECAUSE I WANTED YOU TO SAY AT PARTIES THAT I'M DANIEL WEISENGER'S ASSISTANT AND BE PROUD OF ME!”

=== Scene Three ===
Nora and Jenny work in the office. Jenny is also in her mid to late 20s; she is British. She sits at Heather's old desk. The tension between Nora and Jenny is intense. Jenny only wants to stick together and try to move up the ladder as a team because “we girls have to stick together in this sausage factory.” Nora, annoyed by Jenny, feels like the best way to get her to stop is to take jabs at Jenny. Nora eventually speaks on the phone with Joaquin, struggling to get Daniel's medicine sent to him so that Daniel receives it immediately as his plane lands in London. Jenny tries to help, and Nora gets flustered because Jenny is doing her job better than she is. Justin later loses Daniel and he is alone. The office starts to get busy with calls. Nora says, “The only thing keeping [Daniel] from being a full-on homeless person is the four of us.” Nora then decides that she has had enough and walks out. Nick tries to make sense of what happened and Jenny attempts to make things better.

=== Interlude – Justin ===
Justin talks to his therapist about his broken foot. Daniel's limousine ran over Justin's foot, but the latter tries to shed the blame and protect Daniel by saying it was his own fault. The person driving Daniel's limousine drove over his foot. He comes to the conclusion that he does not need his therapist anymore and would rather continue to work for Daniel, saying, “I've seen greatness, I'm next to brilliance every day. And it needs to be defended constantly. He needs to be protected from nobodies LIKE YOU!”

=== Scene Four ===
Nick and Justin are in the office; Nick has been promoted. While typing on their computers, they get a call from Jenny, who is in Tokyo with Daniel. And like Justin, he left her on the side of the road. While they are talking, Nora surprises them by showing up in the office. They put Jenny on speakerphone and they catch up. While Justin continues with the call, Nora and Nick start talking. Nora has realized that she cannot do anything because all her life she has been trying to get close to Daniel and it was all she knew. She wants to see if she can get her job back and begins saying things like, “I can't sleep at night knowing he’s angry at me” and “ I just want to talk to him. I should've just... paused, you know. Instead of blowing up.” She says her goodbyes and leaves as Nick takes a call from Daniel, but puts him on hold and runs after Nora to kiss her and to say, “Don't ever come back here.”

=== Epilogue – Jenny ===
Drunk and dismantled Jenny tap dances wildly around the office and destroys the workspace. Her elegant tap dance is a work of art mixed with hate because she despises what the office stands for. She comments during her dance how absurd Daniel is and how she can destroy his powerful reputation. She concludes by calling herself the “best assistant ever.”

== Production history ==
=== Original production ===
Assistance premiered at the IAMA Theatre Company in Los Angeles in 2008. Assistance ran from April 18-May 24 with performances on Friday and Saturday nights. The production received reviews from both the Los Angeles Times and the LA Weekly. The LA Weekly praised Headland's “scathingly taut dialogue.” Annie McVey directed the production, which starred Adam Shapiro (Nick) and Katie Lowes (Nora).

=== Other productions ===
Assistance was produced at Playwrights Horizons in New York City, New York. It ran from February 27-March 11, 2012. The New York Times theater critic Charles Isherwood criticized the production for its absence of Daniel Weisinger, the head of the company. Isherwood wrote, “Ms. Headland may intend to establish how forcefully a man (or woman) can exert psychological control over his underlings without much personal contact, but after a while it’s like watching The Devil Wears Prada with the Anna Wintour character snipped from every scene.” His main criticism of the production is that there are “no dramatic fireworks.” Isherwood still said that the cast, directed by Trip Cullman, did the best work they could with their “fairly circumscribed roles.” Michael Esper (Nick) and Virginia Kull (Nora) were the leads in the production.

Assistance was produced by the Wilma Theater in Philadelphia from January 2-February 3, 2013. David Kennedy directed the production starring Kate Czajkowski (Nora) and Kevin Meehan (Nick). Stage Magazine critic Debra Miller commended Headland and the Wilma's cast, saying that the play was “all written with acerbic wit by Headland and played with farcical precision by the Wilma’s spot-on cast.”

=== Television show ===
NBC gave a script order to Headland's Assistance, a single-camera workplace comedy based on the play. Nora was to be played by Krysten Ritter and Nick was to be played by Zach Cregger. The show was to be produced by Gary Sanchez, Will Ferrell’s production company. Ferrell expected the show to be fairly similar to Headland's original play.
