= The Spine of Night =

2021 animated fantasy horror film

- Theatrical release poster
- Directed by: Philip Gelatt; Morgan Galen King
- Written by: Philip Gelatt; Morgan Galen King
- Produced by: Will Battersby; Phillip Gelatt; Jean Rattle
- Starring: Richard E. Grant; Lucy Lawless; Patton Oswalt; Betty Gabriel; Joe Manganiello
- Music by: Peter Scartabello
- Production companies: Gorgonaut; Reno Productions
- Distributed by: Shudder RLJE Films (United States); Yellow Veil Pictures (International)
- Release dates: March 18, 2021 (SXSW); October 29, 2021 (United States)
- Running time: 93 minutes
- Country: United States
- Language: English

The Spine of Night is a 2021 American adult animated dark fantasy horror film written and directed by Philip Gelatt and Morgan Galen King. It stars Richard E. Grant, Lucy Lawless, Patton Oswalt, Betty Gabriel, and Joe Manganiello.

The film was completed using rotoscoped animation, and traces the centuries-long journey of a magical plant that bestows terrible power upon the user, as it inspires despots, empires, and black magic.

== Plot ==
The story begins with the witch-queen Tzod ascending a snowy mountain. At its peak, in a giant skull, she confronts the guardian of a mystic flower known as the Bloom. While the guardian initially threatens her and tries to drive her away, she shows an identical flower, explaining that her people had found where it had cast a seed long ago.

She then begins to tell the events that have led her here, which largely concern a renegade scholar named Ghal-Sur. After both he and Tzod are thrown in the prison of a young tyrant, she uses the power of the Bloom to help them escape. Shortly thereafter, Ghal-Sur murders the queen and steals the Bloom from her; when he returns to his fellow scholars at a place of study called The Pantheon.

Some time later, starving peasants mass at The Pantheons gates and, despite the protest of a warrior monk named Phae-Agura, the head Inquisitor insists on keeping the gates locked. The Inquisitor consults with Ghal-Sur, who is locked in a dungeon, and is convinced to assist as he performs a ritual to unlock more of the Bloom's power. Phaeo-Agura is killed trying to stop the Inquisitor who dies after absorbing too much power and massacres both peasants and his own people.

Ghal-Sur escapes and then becomes a tyrant in his own right, marching armies across the countryside and eventually using the Bloom to create great war machines and a following of slaves and fanatics to expand his conquest. An unknown number of years later, a trio of assassins attempts to stop him, managing only to incinerate his stores of the Bloom instead preventing God Emperor Ghal-Sur from resurrecting some of his followers; the last trace of it travels downstream until it finds the corpse of Tzod, resurrecting her and driving her to seek the guardian as she did in the beginning.

The Guardian also tells the story of the Bloom itself: The giant skull it rests in was the last god before men killed it, but even that god was the progeny of a greater god, whose severed head formed the world, and the Bloom communicates to those who bear it that this cycle goes on upward and upward without end, eternal and violent. The Guardian Tzod meets is only the most recent, as they exist in their own cycle: many come seeking the bloom, and each guardian has discovered the bloom, learned its secrets, and concluded its knowledge is unbearable to the world at large. Each Guardian has defended the bloom for the rest of their lives, until they became too weary, and allowed themselves to be felled by a prospective seeker of the Bloom who learns the massive truth of the universe and decides to conceal it, becoming the next Guardian. It is revealed that the present Guardian had breathed across the Bloom when he first learned its truth, and was the one to initially spread seeds of it.

In the present, Tzod beckons Ghal-Sur to the mountain peak where the Bloom rests, and while his soldiers quickly mortally wound her, she is able to use the Bloom's power to raise the bodies of the previous guardians, who butcher the soldiers and allow Tzod to deal a deathblow to Ghal-Sur. She is incinerated by the release of power, her skull spinning out into the stars like that of the god who formed the world, while the seeds of the Bloom scatter on the wind.

== Cast ==
- Richard E. Grant as The Guardian
- Lucy Lawless as Tzod
- Patton Oswalt as Lord Pyrantin
- Betty Gabriel as Phae-Agura
- Joe Manganiello as Mongrel
- Jordan Douglas Smith as Ghal-Sur
- Patrick Breen as Doa
- Larry Fessenden as Prophet of Doom
- Tom Lipinski as Falconhawk
- Nina Lisandrello as Sparrowcrow
- Abigail Savage as Kestelwren
- Rob McClure as Gull
- Maggie Lakis as Dae

== Production ==
The Spine of Night was directed by Philip Gelatt and Morgan Galen King, who also wrote the script. While King previously worked as an animator, Gelatt is known for his previous work on live-action films. He made the cult horror film They Remain and wrote the script for the science fiction mystery drama Europa Report. He also wrote the script for 15 episodes of the series Love, Death & Robots. After seeing King's short film 'Exordium,' Gelatt approached King about expanding the film into a feature length rotoscoped epic. This project became The Spine of Night.

They wanted to tell an adult story within the fantasy genre. The aesthetic they found appropriate for this was the hand-drawn rotoscope animation, which was preferred in the late 1970s and early 1980s. The drawings were created on the computer, but classically at 12 frames per second, as is usual in rotoscope animation. In this animation technique, artists hand-draw over live-action footage, frame by frame. The hand-animation took seven years, and weeks before the film's premiere at South by Southwest, the entire film was almost lost when King's Microsoft Windows system auto-updated while he slept.

Gelatt and King drew inspiration for their work from fantasy and science fiction illustrations by Frank Frazetta and the work of animator Ralph Bakshi, in particular his 1983 film Fire and Ice.

== Release ==
In 2021, RLJE Films and Shudder acquired the U.S. distribution and streaming rights. It premiered at the South by Southwest Film Festival (SXSW) on March 18, 2021, Annecy International Animation Film Festival on June 16, 2021, Art Film Fest on June 26, 2021, Neuchâtel International Fantastic Film Festival on July 4, 2021, Melbourne International Film Festival on August 7, 2021, FanTasia on August 14, 2021,

The film also screened at the Beyond Fest on October 2, 2021, Sitges Film Festival on October 8, 2021 and at the Fantasy Filmfest on October 17, 2021. It was released on digital and theatrically on October 29, 2021.

== Reception ==
On the review aggregator website Rotten Tomatoes, the film holds an approval rating of 82% based on 65 reviews, with an average rating of 6.60/10. The website's critical consensus reads: "With a hard fantasy story that stands in service of its eye-catching animation, The Spine of Night is a distinctive treat for genre enthusiasts." According to Metacritic, which sampled seven critics and calculated a weighted average score of 60 out of 100, the film received "mixed or average reviews".
