= Cult of Love =

Stage play written by Leslye Headland

Cult Of Love
- Written by: Leslye Headland
- Original language: English
- Genre: Drama
- Setting: Modern Day, U.S.

Premiere
- Date premiered: May 18, 2018
- Place premiered: IAMA Theatre Company

Cult Of Love is a dramatic stage play with music, written by American playwright Leslye Headland.

== Background ==
Leslye Headland conceived the play as part of her Seven Deadly Sins cycle, with Cult of Love representing the theme of pride. Headland examines the Dahl family under the lens of accepting your family for who they are, even when their beliefs may be different from yours. The title comes from the idea that the familial unit can be a cult of its own, while she also tackles themes of religious differences within a household. The show premiered at the IAMA Theatre in Los Angeles as part of their 10th Anniversary season in 2018. Directed by Annie Tippe, the show ran from May 18, 2018 until June 24, 2018.

The show programmed for the 2020 season of the Williamstown Theatre Festival, directed by Trip Cullman; originally meant to be an in-person production. The production was cancelled due to the COVID-19 pandemic. The show includes musical segments with original songs, with the family gathering together to sing during the holidays.

== Production history ==
=== Berkeley Repertory Theatre (2024) ===
A new production directed by Trip Cullman was staged by Berkeley Repertory Theatre as part of their 2023-2024 season, running from January 26 - March 3, 2024.

=== Broadway (2024) ===
In June 2024, it was announced that Cult of Love would premiere on Broadway as part of Second Stage Theater's 2024-2025 season at the Helen Hayes Theater, with Trip Cullman returning as director. The show began previews November 20, 2024, opened on December 12, 2024, and closed on February 2, 2025 as a limited run. The production was nominated for a GLAAD Media Award for Outstanding Broadway Production.

Shailene Woodley, Zachary Quinto, Barbie Ferreira, and Mare Winningham starred in the Broadway production. The cast included Roberta Colindrez and Rebecca Henderson, as well as three returning cast members from the Berkeley Rep production: Molly Bernard, Chris Lowell, and Christopher Sears.

The production received an Outer Critics Circle Awards nomination for Outstanding New Broadway Play, along with Winningham receiving a nomination for Outstanding Featured Performer in a Broadway Play and Cullman receiving a nomination for Outstanding Direction of a Play.

== Original casts ==
Character	Los Angeles	Williamstown	Berkeley	Broadway
Character	2018	2020	2024	2024
Virginia "Ginny" Dahl	Keliher Walsh	Kate Burton	Luisa Sermol	Mare Winningham
William "Bill" Dahl	Tom Amandes	Dylan Baker	Dan Hiatt	David Rasche
Diana Dahl-Bennett	Christine Woods	Taylor Schilling	Kerstin Anderson	Shailene Woodley
James Bennett	Graham Sibley	Chris Lowell	Chris Lowell	Chris Lowell
Mark Dahl	John Lavelle	Michael Esper	Lucas Near-Verbrugghe	Zachary Quinto
Rachel Dahl	Laila Ayad	Miriam Silverman	Molly Bernard	Molly Bernard
Evie Dahl	Melissa Stephens	Rebecca Henderson	Virginia Kull	Rebecca Henderson
Johnny Dahl	Christian Durso	-	Christopher Sears	Christopher Sears
Pippa Ferguson	Tina Huang	-	Cass Bugge	Roberta Colindrez
Lauren Montgomery	Lilli Stein	Paige Gilbert	Vero Maynez	Barbie Ferreira

== Film adaptation ==
On April 17, 2025, it was announced that a film adaptation of the play was in development, with Headland set to adapt the screenplay and direct the film. It was also announced that Will Ferrell and Jessica Elbaum will produce the film adaptation through their Gloria Sanchez Productions.

== Awards and nominations ==
=== 2024 Broadway production ===
Year	Award	Category	Nominated work	Result	Ref.
2025	Dorian Awards	Outstanding LGBTQ Broadway Production		Nominated	
2025	Dorian Awards	Outstanding Featured Performer in a Broadway Play	Molly Bernard	Nominated	
2025	Dorian Awards	Outstanding Featured Performer in a Broadway Play	Zachary Quinto	Nominated	
2025	Dorian Awards	Outstanding Broadway Ensemble	Ensemble	Nominated	
2025	Outer Critics Circle Award	Outstanding New Broadway Play	Leslye Headland	Nominated	
2025	Outer Critics Circle Award	Outstanding Featured Performer in a Broadway Play	Mare Winningham	Nominated	
2025	Outer Critics Circle Award	Outstanding Direction of a Play	Trip Cullman	Nominated	
2025	Theater World Award	Excellence in Theater Award	Shailene Woodley	Won	
