= William Jackson Harper =

American actor (born 1980)

- Harper at the 2026 Toronto International Film Festival.
- Born: William Fitzgerald Harper; February 8, 1980 (age 46); Dallas, Texas, United States
- Education: College of Santa Fe
- Occupations: Actor, playwright
- Years active: 2007–present

William Fitzgerald Harper (born February 8, 1980), known professionally as William Jackson Harper, is an American actor and playwright. He gained acclaim for his role as Chidi Anagonye in the NBC comedy series The Good Place (2016–2020), for which he was nominated for the Primetime Emmy Award for Outstanding Supporting Actor in a Comedy Series.

Harper started his career as a main cast member of the PBS Kids Go! series The Electric Company (2009–2011). As a playwright, he wrote We Live Here (2010) and Travisville (2018). He made his Broadway acting debut portraying civil rights activist Stokely Carmichael in the play All the Way (2013). Harper's other notable roles on stage include Romeo & Juliet (2012), After the Blast (2017), and Primary Trust (2023). For his role as Astrov in the Lincoln Center Theatre revival of Uncle Vanya (2024) he earned a nomination for the Tony Award for Best Actor in a Play.

He has starred in the Amazon limited series The Underground Railroad (2020), the second season of the HBO Max comedy series Love Life (2021), and in the Peacock comedy mystery series The Resort (2022). Harper has taken supporting roles in films such as Paterson (2016), Midsommar (2019), and Dark Waters (2019). He portrayed Quaz in the Marvel Cinematic Universe film Ant-Man and the Wasp: Quantumania (2023).

== Early life and education ==
William Fitzgerald Harper was born on February 8, 1980, in Dallas, Texas. Harper grew up in Garland, Texas, and attended Lakeview Centennial High School. He graduated from the College of Santa Fe in 2003. Harper chose the stage name "William Jackson Harper" when registering for the Actors' Equity Association; most variations of "William Harper" were already in use, and he thought that "Fitzgerald" was too long. He then decided to honor his mother by using her maiden name, "Jackson", as his stage middle name.

== Career ==
Harper made his New York theatre debut in the 2006 Vital Theatre Company production of Full Bloom, a play about teenagers coming to terms with their sexuality. In 2008 he performed in Manhattan Theatre Club's production of Lynn Nottage's play, Ruined, which won the 2009 Pulitzer Prize for Drama. From 2009 to 2011, he played Danny Rebus in the PBS series The Electric Company. In 2010 he appeared in the Public Theater's mobile unit production of Shakespeare's Measure for Measure, and in 2011 returned for Titus Andronicus, this time at the Anspacher Theater. He starred as Marty Boy in debut of The Total Bent, a musical composed by Stew and Heidi Rodewald, that premiered at The Public Theater in 2012. The show was later reworked around Ato Blankson-Wood. Harper made his Broadway debut in 2014 portraying Stokely Carmichael in the Robert Schenkkan play All the Way starring Bryan Cranston as President Lyndon B. Johnson. The play revolved around the passing of the Civil Rights Act of 1964. The production went on to win the Tony Award for Best Play. Harper and Carrie Coon co-starred together in the 2015 Melissa James Gibson play, Placebo at Playwrights Horizon Theater. Marilyn Stasio of Variety praised him writing, "Harper inhabits the difficult role as comfortably as someone who lives in robe and slippers". The following year he took a supporting role in the Jim Jarmusch drama Paterson (2016) starring Adam Driver.

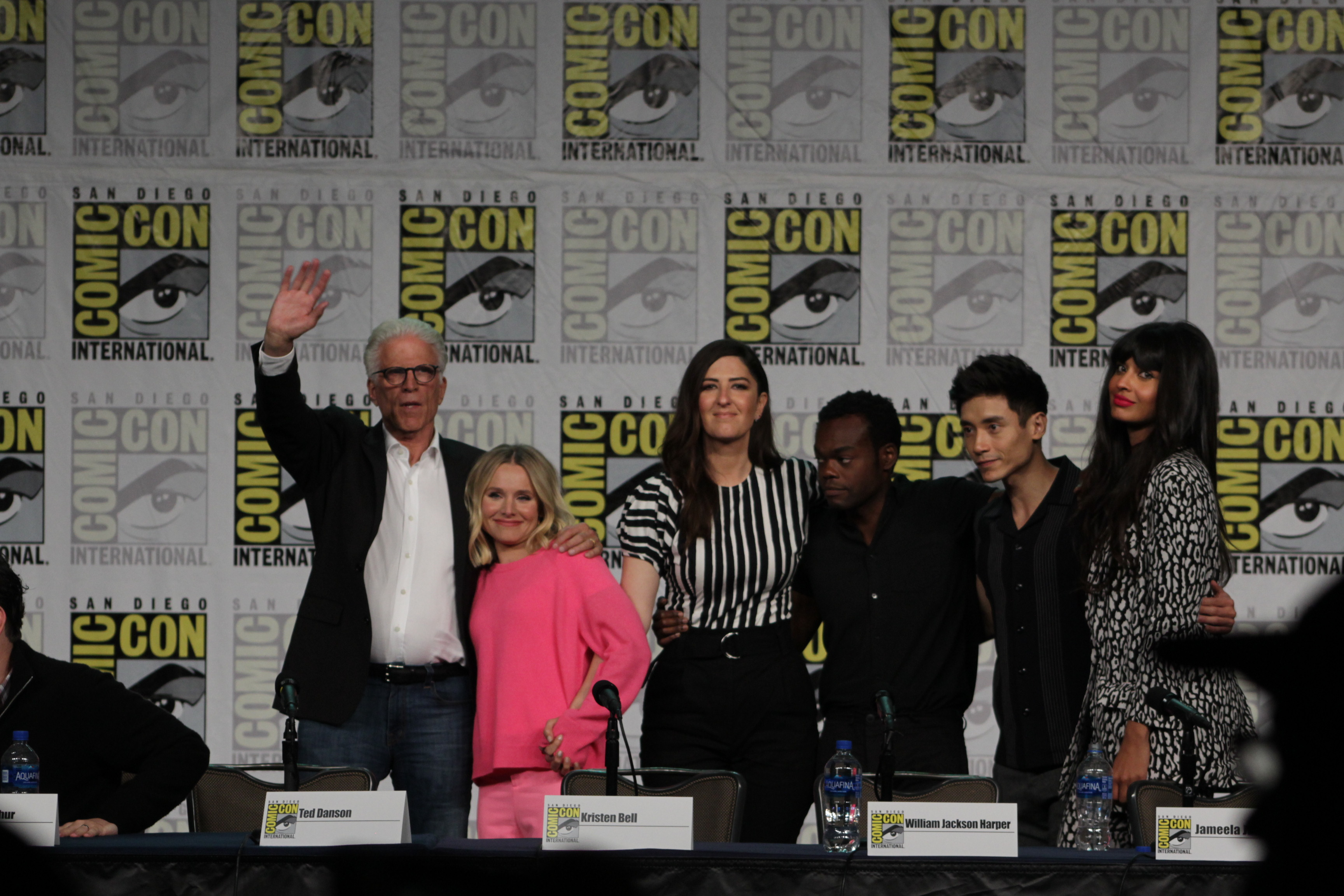
The Good Place cast (Ted Danson, Kristen Bell, D'Arcy Carden, Harper, Manny Jacinto, and Jameela Jamil) at San Diego Comic-Con in 2019

In 2016, Harper was cast on the NBC comedy The Good Place created by Michael Schur. Before landing the role of Chidi Anagonye, he considered quitting acting. Harper did not learn about the show's real premise until after he was cast. His performance has received critical praise and he was nominated for the Primetime Emmy Award for Outstanding Supporting Actor in a Comedy Series in 2020. In 2017, in between filming the show's first and second seasons, he had a leading role alongside Cristin Milioti in Zoe Kazan's futuristic romantic drama After the Blast at Lincoln Center's Claire Tow Theatre. Frank Scheck of The Hollywood Reporter wrote, "[Kazan] has...elicited superb performances from the lead actors, with Harper quietly persuasive as the husband desperately trying to keep his marriage intact". Also in 2017 he had a supporting role in the VH1 drama series The Breaks.

In 2018, Harper's play Travisville had its world premiere at Ensemble Studio Theatre. In an interview with Bloomberg News, he revealed that the play was inspired by the displacement of a poor Black community that was situated near the grounds of the Texas State Fair in Dallas. The same year, he appeared in the sci-fi film They Remain. In 2019, he starred in two critically acclaimed films, playing Josh in the Ari Aster directed horror film Midsommar and James Ross in the Todd Haynes legal thriller Dark Waters. Also that year, he voiced John Mercer Langston in season one of the Airship podcast 1865, which details the weeks immediately following the assassination of US President Abraham Lincoln.

It was announced in April 2020 that he would narrate the Marvel audio book series Black Panther: Sins of the King, and in November 2020, that he would star in season 2 of the HBO Max anthology series Love Life. In 2021 he acted in the Barry Jenkins directed Amazon Prime Video miniseries The Underground Railroad adapted from the Pulitzer Prize-winning 2016 historical novel of the same name by Colson Whitehead. For his performance Harper was nominated for the Critics' Choice Television Award for Best Supporting Actor in a Movie/Miniseries. In October 2022, it was revealed that Harper joined the cast of Ant-Man and the Wasp: Quantumania, set in the Marvel Cinematic Universe. The film was released in theaters on February 17, 2023.

In 2023 he starred as Kenneth in the Eboni Booth play Primary Trust at the Roundabout Theatre Company Off-Broadway. The play ran from May 4 to July 2 at the Laura Pels Theatre. Naveen Kumar of The New York Times praised his performance writing, "Harper, who is onstage for nearly all of the production’s 95 minutes, performs with astonishing ease and vulnerability, particularly given the depths he is asked to plumb in monologues directly to the audience; he lends the currents flowing through Kenneth's interior life extraordinary subtlety and immediacy". For his performance Harper won the 2023 Obie Award for Outstanding Performance. Harper is set to return to Broadway playing Astrov in the 2024 revival of the Anton Chekhov play Uncle Vanya starring Steve Carell, Alison Pill, Jayne Houdyshell and Alfred Molina at Lincoln Center. For his performance he received a nomination for the Tony Award for Best Actor in a Play. In January 2026 it was announced that Harper was cast in Cry Wolf, a limited series on FX inspired by the Danish series Ulven Kommer.

== Personal life ==
Harper is in a relationship with actress Ali Ahn, who co-starred with him in an outdoor production of Romeo + Juliet in New York in 2012.

== Acting credits ==
=== Film ===
Year	Title	Role	Notes	Ref.
2010	All Good Things	Moynihan's Assistant		
2012	That's What She Said	Harry		
2015	True Story	Zak Rausch		
2016	Paterson	Everett		
2018	They Remain	Keith		
2019	Lost Holiday	Mark		
2019	Midsommar	Josh		
2019	Dark Waters	James Ross		
2020	David	David	Short film	
2020	The Man in the Woods	Buster Heath		
2021	We Broke Up	Doug		
2023	Landscape with Invisible Hand	Mr. Campbell		
2023	Ant-Man and the Wasp: Quantumania	Quaz		
2026	The Life and Deaths of Wilson Shedd	TBA	Post-production	

=== Television ===
Year	Title	Role	Notes	Ref.
2007	Law & Order: Criminal Intent	Chayne Danforth	Episode: "Self-made"	
2009	Great Performances	Melville	Episode: "Harlem in Montmartre: A Paris Jazz Story"	
2009	Mercy	David Green	Episode: "I Believe You Conrad"	
2009–2011	The Electric Company	Danny Rebus	Main cast; 52 episodes	
2010	Law & Order	Officer Derek Waldron	Episode: "Boy on Fire"	
2011	30 Rock	Rioter	Episode: "Plan B"	
2013	Unforgettable	Andry Fotre aka Arnold	Episode: "Incognito"	
2014	High Maintenance	Andrew	Episode: "Geiger"	
2015	Person of Interest	Strobel	Episode: "Control-Alt-Delete"	
2015	The Blacklist	Security	Episode: "Tom Connolly (No. 11)"	
2016	Deadbeat	Adam	Episode: "Death List Three"	
2016–2020	The Good Place	Chidi Anagonye	Main cast; 53 episodes	
2017	The Breaks	Stephen Jenkins	3 episodes	
2019	Jack Ryan	Xander	2 episodes	
2020–2021	American Dad!	TV Reporter, General Store Cashier, Nathaniel (voices)	3 episodes	
2021–2022	Dogs in Space	Loaf (voice)	16 episodes	
2021	The Underground Railroad	Royal	4 episodes	
2021	Inside Job	Bryan Jacobsen / Bryan Bot (voice)	Episode: "Sex Machina"	
2021	Love Life	Marcus Watkins	Main role (season 2)	
2021	Death to 2021	Zero Fournine	Television special	
2022	The Resort	Noah	Main cast	
2022	Little Demon	Jimmy (voice)	Episode: "Everybody's Dying for the Weekend"	
2024	A Man in Full	Wes Jordan	6 episodes	
2025	The Morning Show	Ben Ross	6 episodes	
2025	Elsbeth	Gary Pidgeon	Episode: "Poetic Justice"	
2026	American Hostage	Ben Hairston		
TBA	Cry Wolf	Arthur		

=== Theater ===
Year	Title	Role	Playwright	Venue	Ref.
2007	Neglect	Joseph	Sharyn Rothstein	Ensemble Studio Theatre, Off-Broadway	
2007–2008	Queens Boulevard (The Musical)	Performer	Charles L. Mee	Signature Theatre Company, Off-Broadway	
2008	Paradise Park	Benny	Charles L. Mee	Signature Theatre Company, Off-Broadway	
2008	Rich Boyfriend	Performer	Evan Smith	The New Group, Off-Broadway	
2008	Ruined	Miner / Soldier; Simon / Aid Worker	Lynn Nottage	Goodman Theatre, Chicago	
2009	Ruined	Miner / Soldier; Simon / Aid Worker	Lynn Nottage	New York City Center, Off-Broadway	
2010	A Cool Dip in the Barren Saharan Crick	Adebe	Kia Corthron	Playwrights Horizons, Off-Broadway	
2010	microcrisis	Fed Chair / Acquah	Michael Lew	HERE Arts Center, Off-Broadway	
2011	The Sugar House at the Edge of the Wilderness	Performer	Carla Ching	The Connelly Theater, Off-Broadway	
2011	Titus Andronicus	Demetrius	William Shakespeare	The Public Theater, Off-Broadway	
2012	The Total Bent	Marty Boy	Stew	The Public Theater, Off-Broadway	
2012	Massacre (Sing To Your Children)	Performer	José Rivera	Rattlestick Playwrights Theater	
2012	Romeo & Juliet	Romeo	William Shakespeare	Shakespeare on the Sound	
2012	Modern Terrorism, or They Who Want to Kill Us and How We Learn to Love Them	Qala	Jon Kern	Second Stage Theater, Off-Broadway	
2013	All the Way	Stokely Carmichael	Robert Schenkkan	American Repertory Theatre	
2014	All the Way	Stokely Carmichael	Robert Schenkkan	Neil Simon Theatre, Broadway	
2014	You Got Older	Mac	Clare Barron	HERE Arts Center, Off-Broadway	
2015	Placebo	Jonathan	Melissa James Gibson	Playwrights Horizons, Off-Broadway	
2017	After the Blast	Oliver	Zoe Kazan	Lincoln Center Theater, Off-Broadway	
2023	Primary Trust	Kenneth	Eboni Booth	Roundabout Theatre Company, Off-Broadway	
2024	Uncle Vanya	Astrov	Anton Chekov	Vivian Beaumont Theatre, Broadway	

== Awards and nominations ==
Year	Association	Category	Nominated work	Result	Ref.
2018	Critics' Choice Television Award	Best Supporting Actor in a Comedy Series	The Good Place	Nominated	
2019	Critics' Choice Television Award	Best Supporting Actor in a Comedy Series	The Good Place	Nominated	
2020	Primetime Emmy Awards	Outstanding Supporting Actor in a Comedy Series	The Good Place	Nominated	
2021	Critics' Choice Television Award	Best Supporting Actor in a Movie/Miniseries	The Underground Railroad	Nominated	
2022	Critics' Choice Television Award	Best Actor in a Movie/Miniseries	Love Life	Nominated	
2023	Obie Awards	Outstanding Performance	Primary Trust	Won	
2024	Drama Desk Awards	Outstanding Lead Performance in a Play	Primary Trust	Nominated	
2024	Drama League Awards	Distinguished Performance	Primary Trust	Nominated	
2024	Lucille Lortel Awards	Outstanding Lead Performer in a Play	Primary Trust	Nominated	
2024	Outer Critics Circle Awards	Outstanding Lead Performer in an Off-Broadway Play	Primary Trust	Won	
2024	Tony Award	Best Actor in a Play	Uncle Vanya	Nominated	

== See also ==
- African-American Tony nominees and winners
