= Gracepoint =

American crime drama television series

- Genre: Crime drama
- Based on: Broadchurch by Chris Chibnall
- Developed by: Chris Chibnall
- Starring: David Tennant; Anna Gunn; Michael Peña; Virginia Kull; Nick Nolte; Jacki Weaver; Josh Hamilton; Kevin Rankin; Kevin Zegers; Jessica Lucas; Stephen Louis Grush; Madalyn Horcher; Sarah-Jane Potts; Jack Irvine; Kendrick Sampson
- Country of origin: United States
- Original language: English
- No. of seasons: 1
- No. of episodes: 10

Production
- Executive producers: David Tennant; Anna Gunn; Anya Epstein; Dan Futterman; Chris Chibnall; Jane Featherstone; John Goldwyn; Carolyn Bernstein
- Production location: Victoria, British Columbia
- Cinematography: John Grillo
- Running time: 44 minutes
- Production companies: Shine America; Kudos; South Slope Pictures; Imaginary Friends

Original release
- Network: Fox
- Release: October 2 – December 11, 2014

Related
- Broadchurch; Malaterra

Gracepoint is an American crime drama television series created by Chris Chibnall. It is a remake of Chibnall's series Broadchurch, and it stars that series' lead, David Tennant, along with Anna Gunn, as two detectives investigating the murder of a boy in a small, tightly knit coastal town.

The series premiered on October 2, 2014, on Fox. The network promoted the show's ten-episode run as a "limited series".

== Cast ==
=== Main ===
- David Tennant as Detective Emmett Carver
- Anna Gunn as Detective Ellie Miller
- Michael Peña as Mark Solano, father of Danny Solano
- Virginia Kull as Beth Solano, mother of Danny Solano and wife of Mark Solano
- Nick Nolte as Jack Reinhold, kayak/bike rental shop owner and wildlife recorder
- Jacki Weaver as Susan Wright
- Josh Hamilton as Joe Miller, husband of Ellie Miller
- Kevin Rankin as Paul Coates, priest of the local church
- Kevin Zegers as Owen Burke, Ellie's nephew and a reporter for the Gracepoint Journal
- Jessica Lucas as Renee Clemons, a reporter working at the San Francisco Globe
- Stephen Louis Grush as Vince Novik, Mark Solano's plumbing apprentice and best friend
- Madalyn Horcher as Chloe Solano, sister of Danny Solano and daughter of Mark and Beth Solano
- Sarah-Jane Potts as Gemma Fisher, owner of the Crestview Inn
- Jack Irvine as Tom Miller, son of Ellie Miller and classmate of Danny Solano
- Kendrick Sampson as Dean Iverson, boyfriend of Chloe Solano

=== Recurring ===
- Alisen Down as Kathy Eaton, editor of the Gracepoint Journal
- Adam Greydon Reid as Raymond Connelly, phone engineer
- Tom Butler as Chief of Detectives Terrence Morgan
- Darcy Laurie as Hugo Garcia, a crime scene investigator
- Nikolas Filipovic as Danny Solano
- Karyn Mott as Detective Angela Schulz
- Aaron Craven as Jeff

== Episodes ==
No.	Title	Directed by	Written by	Original release date	US viewers (millions)
1	"Episode One"	James Strong	Teleplay by : Chris Chibnall; British Episode by: Chris Chibnall	October 2, 2014	4.76
Detective Ellie Miller is upset when Emmett Carver is assigned as lead detective while she was on vacation. Carver's first case is a cut barbed wire fence. Twelve-year-old Danny Solano goes missing, and his body is found at the base of cliffs overlooking the local beach. Beth Solano sees her son's body on the beach and breaks down. Having known the Solanos for years, Ellie deals with her own personal struggles as well as the Solanos'. A crime scene officer says the crime scene was altered to look like an accident, and the pathologist says Danny was killed by blunt force trauma to the head. Carver and Ellie disclose the cause of Danny's death to the Solanos, and Mark identifies the body. Ellie's nephew and ambitious reporter, Owen Burke, extracts information from Ellie for a Twitter report, causing tension with the police and upsetting the Solanos. Ellie takes the blame for Owen's action. Carver is asked if he wishes to withdraw from the case, but he does not. Renee Clemons, reporter for the San Francisco Globe, arrives in town without her supervisor's permission to try to get an exclusive on the death. Beth visits the crime scene with Ellie, and Ellie expresses her grief to her husband Joe. Ellie tells their son, Tom, about Danny's death, and he then secretly wipes his mobile phone and computer to remove evidence. Owen unwittingly provides Renee with a link to Chloe Solano, and CCTV footage shows Danny skateboarding down a street on the night of his murder. Ellie notes that Danny's phone and skateboard were not recovered at the crime scene and are missing. At a press conference, Carver urges anyone to come forward if someone they know is behaving differently and remarks: "We will catch whoever did this."
2	"Episode Two"	James Strong	Anya Epstein & Dan Futterman	October 9, 2014	3.80
After Ellie is given a list from the Solanos of those they think might have killed Danny, police discover cocaine in Chloe's bedroom and $500 under Danny's bed. Ellie questions Chloe, who says she was holding it for her employer, Gemma Fisher of the Crestview Inn. Gemma claims some guests were asking for the cocaine, and Chloe provided it, but Gemma didn't know who gave it to Chloe. Ellie promised to protect Gemma's reputation, causing an argument with Carver about protecting and trusting the townspeople. Carver is told by Jack Reinhold that he saw Danny talking and joking with a hiker (Brendan Fletcher) on the cliffs ten days before his death. Beth feels stressed at home and goes to the supermarket, only to break down after seeing Danny's favorite cereal. She confides to Paul Coates, her longtime friend and town priest, that she is pregnant. This prompts him to offer comfort to the community. At the police station, Ellie and Carver watch footage of the parking lot near the crime scene to see Mark waiting for someone. Phone engineer Raymond Connelly glimpses a file on Danny and tells them that he was told by Danny from beyond the grave that he was killed near water or a boat. Chloe tells her boyfriend Dean that the cocaine was found. She gets upset when he insinuates it will come back on him. She walks away and meets Renee, who gives her a phone number for future use. Carver visits Susan Wright, caretaker of a beach house near the crime scene, to get the keys to it. It is revealed that she is keeping Danny's skateboard inside her mobile home. While Ellie and crime scene technicians find Danny's blood and shoe prints at the beach house, Carver questions Mark. He initially lies about his alibi but then reveals being out with a friend that he refuses to name. Ellie calls Carver to say Mark's fingerprints were found in the beach house.
3	"Episode Three"	David Petrarca	Anya Epstein & Dan Futterman	October 16, 2014	3.70
Mark is questioned at the police station. Carver and Ellie ask about blood on his fishing boat and his fingerprints at the summer house near the crime scene. He claims the blood is from Danny, who cut his foot on a lure during a family fishing trip. He also says he fixed a burst pipe at the house, but caretaker Susan denies he did so. Mark says he was out with his coworker Vince on the night of the murder. Vince corroborates this, but his mother says he was with her, only leaving to make a pharmacy trip for her. Mark is arrested for obstructing the investigation. Raymond approaches Beth with a message from beyond the grave, and tells her Danny was killed by someone close to the family, in a boat. Tom Miller is questioned by Carver and reveals that Mark struck Danny. More about Carver's illness is revealed, and Beth considers Paul's proposal for a memorial service. Chloe texts Gemma for help, and Gemma tells the police that Mark was having sex with her the night Danny died. Mark is released. When he refuses to tell Beth where he was the night Danny died, she all but accuses him of killing their son. He storms out to meet Gemma; Beth follows, and discovers his infidelity. Renee asks Carver about his past, and reveals she wants to discover Danny's killer because of Carver's failure to do so in the previous case. Ellie refuses to ask Chloe who gave her the cocaine, so Carver calls to say Chloe must do so the next day. Forensics then gives him a scrap of paper with a phone number pulled off Danny's clothing. Carver types the number into a reverse telephone directory.
4	"Episode Four"	James Strong	Anya Epstein & Dan Futterman	October 23, 2014	3.52
The phone number reveals a name, Lars Pierson, the backpacker that Reinhold saw talking to Danny. Pierson's photo is given to Mark, in the hopes someone in the family has seen him with Danny. Beth tells Ellie that Pierson once approached her at the visitor center, seeming cordial but acting odd, after noticing a picture of her children. Chloe confesses that she got the cocaine from her boyfriend Dean, adding that he is not a dealer. Carver and Ellie question Dean, who claims the cocaine was a one-time thing. He also states that he only saw Danny a few times when he visited Chloe. The detectives take Dean to his supplier, who, upon seeing him, then asks about "the murdered kid". Danny was with Dean for the drug deal. Dean then states that he picked Danny up from walking outside of town, stopped for gas, and Danny stole a crossword puzzle book. The video footage of the theft, along with news that Chloe is dating an older boy that deals cocaine, and the police not revealing anything about the case to the Solanos deeply affects the family. Meanwhile, Carver gets a standing invitation to dinner at the Millers; Coates warns Connelly to stay away from Beth; Susan Wright and Vince are shown to have a history together; Tom looks up Pierson's location; and a boat is shown burning on the shoreline.
5	"Episode Five"	James Strong	Anya Epstein & Dan Futterman	October 30, 2014	3.31
Ellie visits the Solano house in hopes of showing signs of normalcy, despite reminders of Danny not being there. Later, Carver has dinner with the Millers, where Joe innocently admits to not liking him. Back in his hotel room, Carver suffers a heart attack and collapses. Gemma finds him after a complaint from a neighbor. He later asks her to keep his health a secret. Susan is shown to not be who she says she is, after a background check from her application at the hotel. Paul cautions the congregation to not look at others with suspicion as that will cause them to turn against each other.
6	"Episode Six"	David Petrarca	Jason Kim	November 6, 2014	3.03
Kathy, editor of the town newspaper, informs Ellie of Susan's past. Owen and Renee's investigation into Jack Reinhold's past, from losing his wife and child to a stint in prison to now mentoring Gracepoint's children, turns the town against him. He commits suicide by walking into the ocean while holding a family portrait of his deceased wife and son. The townsfolk gather to retrace Danny's path the night of his death.
7	"Episode Seven"	Ali Selim	Anya Epstein & Dan Futterman	November 13, 2014	3.49
Tom goes missing after separating from his father on the way to school. Ellie and Carver question Lars Pierson, the backpacker seen with Danny just weeks before his death. Carver's daughter arrives at the police station, only to see that he is just as absorbed in his work here as he was back home. The Millers marriage becomes tense as the search for Tom looks hopeless. Raymond Connelly gives Beth some clues about Tom, and she and Mark join in the search, along with Paul, who finds Tom's bicycle.
8	"Episode Eight"	Mike Slovis	Anya Epstein & Dan Futterman	November 20, 2014	3.12
Tom is found safe, with some minor cuts from falling off his bicycle. He tells his parents and Carver that he was looking for Pierson, after seeing the name in Ellie's casebook and wanting to ask about Danny. After an interrogation with Pierson, Carver is told by Mark of Paul's obsession with Beth, his being sighted at a Narcotics Anonymous meeting, and his finding both Tom and his bicycle. Beth meets with the mother of Nina, the victim in the Rosemont case. The mother is now addicted to alcohol, pills, and sleeps a lot. This deeply affects Beth, who later decides to keep her unborn child. Carver speaks with Paul, who feels the town needs him again in order to cope. He also suggests that Carver will become the next outcast because he arouses the town's suspicion every day that he doesn't find the killer. Susan gives Danny's skateboard to Tom, then goes to the newspaper office where Kathy informs her that her past is now known. She is arrested but will not talk until they find her dog, which Vince has stolen. Paul finds Tom trying to destroy his laptop, after Tom learns its hard drive can be checked. Ellie and Carver investigate the beach house, when it is reported a flashlight has been seen inside. They chase the intruder, but must stop when Carver collapses.
9	"Episode Nine"	Euros Lyn	Anya Epstein & Dan Futterman	December 4, 2014	3.61
Carver refuses to be hospitalized and continues with the investigation, despite warnings it could cause his death. Morgan advises him he will be removed from the force in 24 hours and forces him to turn over his gun. Ellie links Susan to Danny's murder through cigarette butts at the crime scene. Susan claims she saw Danny's body on the beach during a late-night walk, and tells Ellie her life story. Renee learns of Carver's collapse, and Carver contacts Raymond in a desperate attempt to solve the case. Owen blackmails Carver into giving him an exclusive or he will publicly reveal Carver's health problems. Beth seeks Paul's counsel about keeping their baby and Mark spots her leaving Paul's residence. Ellie confronts Susan, who claims she saw Vince arrive in a boat and leave the body and skateboard on the beach. Vince is arrested and the dog is found. Susan reveals that Vince is her son, and she believes he's a child murderer like his father. Vince says he went hunting with Danny without the Solanos' permission. Carver learns Danny's phone was used to report the summer house break-in. Paul tells Carver that Tom and Danny were not getting along and gives him the smashed laptop he recovered from Tom. Carver meets for an interview with Kathy and Owen, and confesses that his ex-wife was responsible for the loss of evidence that led to the collapse of the previous murder case. Carver took the blame to protect their daughter. Susan requests to see Vince, who threatens her, and she leaves Gracepoint later that night. Size-ten footprints - the size of Vince's feet - are found at the summer house. Carver asks Ellie about a fight between Tom and Danny, then requests access to Tom's computer.
10	"Episode Ten"	Euros Lyn	Anya Epstein & Dan Futterman	December 11, 2014	4.01
Carver questions Tom, with Joe present, about his laptop and its contents. He records the interview on his mobile phone. He informs Tom of knowing about his blackmailing and threatening Paul as to who hit Danny. Later, Carver is told that Danny's cell phone is active again. To protect Ellie, he has her further question Vince, still jailed. Carver follows the cell signal to the Millers' house to find Joe with the phone in the garage. Joe relates what happened to Danny. The two of them had been close friends for three months. They met at the beach house, where Joe ultimately made a sexual advance on Danny, who ran outside. Joe apologized, saying life can return to normal. However, Danny was horrified and tried to flee. He fell, hitting his head on a rock, and died. Using the boat, Joe placed his body on the beach. When told, Ellie is horrified and takes her sons to a motel. There, she informs Tom of his father's arrest, but Tom's behavior seems odd. Ellie figures it out: Tom killed Danny. He tells her that he witnessed the events at the beach, but tried to protect Danny from Joe with an oar; however, he accidentally struck Danny in the head, killing him. Both Joe and Ellie protect Tom. With Joe's arrest, the town holds a beach campfire ceremony. Carver and Ellie view it from a distance, then, feeling uneasy, she leaves. Carver contacts his daughter to make peace then watches Tom's recorded video. He sees a shared look between father and son when Tom states that "I never saw anyone else hit Danny". Carver knows the Millers' secret. At the motel, Ellie doesn't answer his call.

== Production ==
It was announced in August 2013 at the Television Critics Association Summer Press Tour that American television network Fox would develop an American version of Broadchurch, a critically acclaimed British series that had successful broadcasts in both the UK on ITV and the US on BBC America. Chris Chibnall wrote the premiere episode and was executive producer of the series. Production began in January 2014 for a spot in Fox's 2014 fall season. The American adaptation was retitled as Gracepoint. James Strong, director of the majority of the original series, directed several episodes of Fox's adaptation.

Fox executives specifically said Gracepoint would have a different ending from Broadchurch.

=== Casting ===
On October 2, 2013, David Tennant was confirmed to be starring as Detective Emmett Carver. Tennant also starred in the UK crime drama Broadchurch, from which Gracepoint is adapted. On November 18, 2013, two more actors joined, with Anna Gunn as Detective Ellie Miller and Jacki Weaver as Susan Wright. On December 3, 2013 Kevin Rankin was cast as Paul Coates and Virginia Kull as Beth, Danny's mother. On December 16, 2013, Kevin Zegers joined the cast of the series; he will play the role of news reporter Owen Burke. On December 19, 2013, Michael Peña was added to the cast to portray Mark Latimer (renamed Solano), Danny's father.

On December 20, 2013, Josh Hamilton was cast as Joe Miller, Det. Ellie Miller's husband. On December 23, 2013, Nick Nolte joined the cast as Jack Reinhold. On January 15, 2014, Kendrick Sampson was cast as Dean Iverson. On January 16, 2014, Jack Irvine was added to the cast as Tom Miller, son of Ellie and Joe Miller, and Danny's best friend. On January 22, 2014, Madalyn Horcher was added to the cast as Chloe Latimer, daughter of Mark and Beth, sister of Danny. On January 23, 2014, Webster Talent tweeted that Darcy Laurie will play the role of Hugo Garcia. On February 12, 2014, Sarah-Jane Potts joined the cast as Gemma.

=== Filming ===
Filming began on January 28, 2014, in Oak Bay, British Columbia. It was filmed until late-May 2014 in the nearby locations of Greater Victoria including the city of Victoria, British Columbia. The marketplace at Portside Marina in Sidney, British Columbia, Canada was portrayed as Gracepoint Police Headquarters while filming during the spring of 2014. In one episode, Nils Jensen, the mayor of Oak Bay, played himself.

== Reception ==
The series has received mixed reviews from critics, drawing unfavorable comparison to the original British series. On the review aggregator site Rotten Tomatoes, the series holds a 64% rating based on 59 reviews, with an average rating of 5.99/10. The consensus reads: "While it may suffer in comparison to its British predecessor Broadchurch, Gracepoint brings an engrossing, sophisticated, and stylish crime drama to network television with Anna Gunn as a commanding lead." On Metacritic, the show has a score of 62 out of 100, based on 29 critics, indicating "generally favorable reviews". Even so, lead actor David Tennant won at the 41st People's Choice Awards in 2015 for Favorite Actor in a New TV Series.

== Broadcast ==
In the UK, Gracepoint aired on ITV Encore, a satellite-only channel owned by ITV, the channel that aired Broadchurch. It premiered on April 1, 2015 and was released on DVD in the UK in June 2015 from publisher Acorn Media UK. The series has been sold by Shine International to both Australia and Canada. It began airing on Foxtel in Australia on October 3, 2014, and Global TV in Canada on October 2, 2014.
