= Leslye Headland =

American writer and director (born 1980)

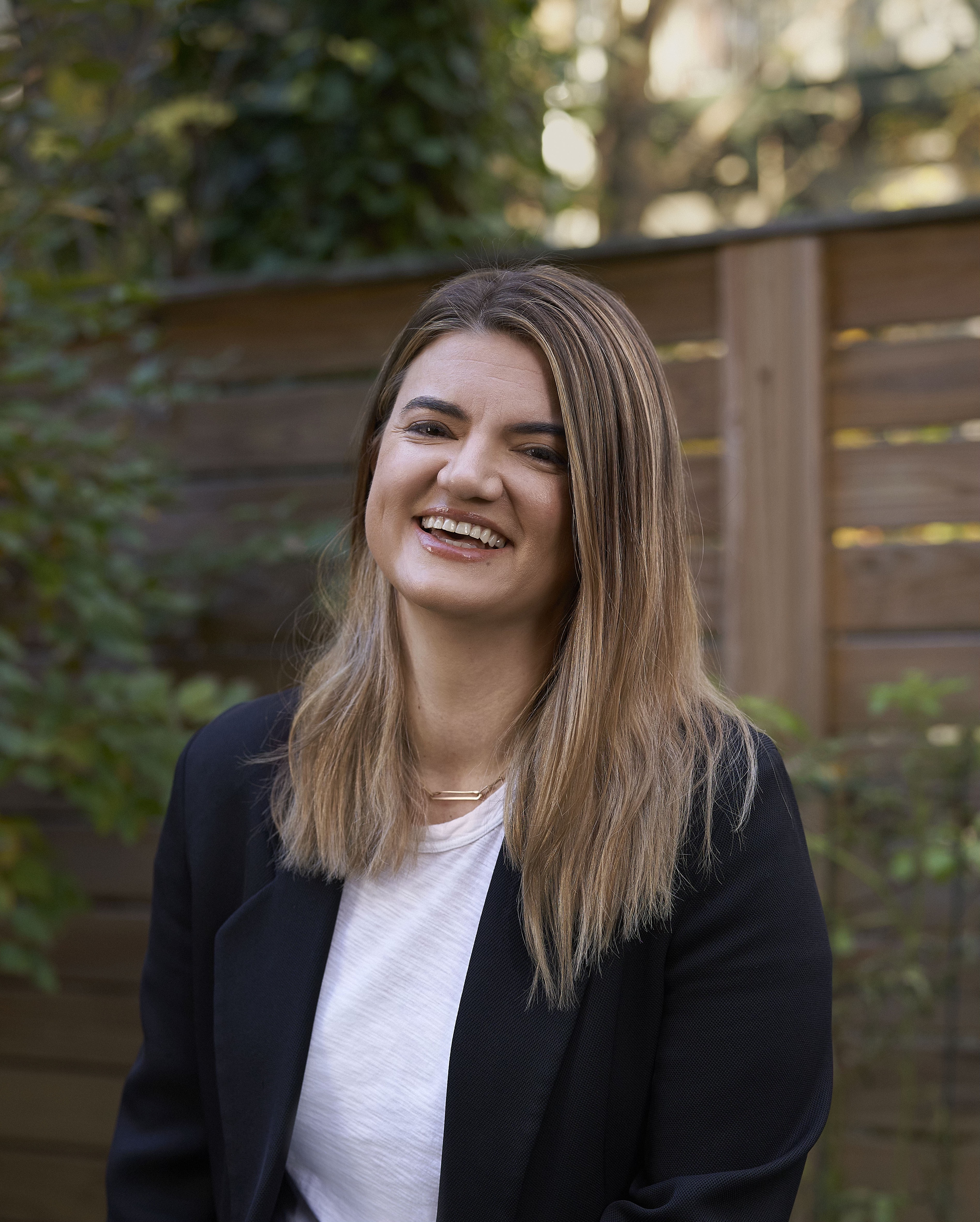
- Headland in 2021
- Born: November 26, 1980 (age 45); Maryland, U.S.
- Occupations: Playwright, screenwriter, director
- Spouse: Rebecca Henderson (m. 2016)
- Children: 1
- Writing career
- Years active: 2007–present

Leslye Headland (born November 26, 1980) is an American film and television director, screenwriter, and playwright. She directed the comedic films Bachelorette (2012), and Sleeping with Other People (2015). She co-created the Netflix series Russian Doll (2019–2022) which earned her two Primetime Emmy Award nominations for Outstanding Comedy Series and Outstanding Writing for a Comedy Series. She served as the creator and showrunner on the Disney+ Star Wars series The Acolyte (2024). As a playwright, she has written a string of plays based on the Seven Deadly Sins which include Assistance and Cult of Love, the latter of which marked her debut as a playwright on Broadway in 2024.

== Early life and education ==
Leslye Headland was raised in suburban Maryland. She graduated in 1999 from Staples High School. In 2002, she received her BFA degree in drama from the Tisch School of the Arts at New York University, where she attended Playwrights Horizons Theater School. Upon graduating college, Headland spent three and a half years working as an assistant at Miramax, six months of which was spent as Harvey Weinstein's personal assistant. Her experience during that time is what inspired her 2012 play Assistance, though she has stated she was not physically assaulted by Weinstein and did not witness any incidents.

== Career ==
=== 2010–2018: Early works ===
Headland got her first job in the television industry in 2010 as a staff writer on the FX series Terriers. Her play, Bachelorette, premiered Off-Broadway in 2010. She wrote and directed the 2012 film version of the play, which was her debut as a feature film director. The film premiered at the Sundance Film Festival. Bachelorette co-starred Kirsten Dunst, Lizzy Caplan, and Isla Fisher as three troubled women who reunite for the wedding of a friend played by Rebel Wilson, who was ridiculed in high school. Headland's play Assistance premiered in 2008 and was staged in 2012 at the New York theatre space Playwrights Horizons. It ran from February 27 to March 11. Television rights were acquired by NBC in 2013, to be executive-produced by Will Ferrell and Adam McKay; Krysten Ritter of the ABC series Don't Trust the B— in Apartment 23 was set to both star and executive produce. Dramatists Play Service published Assistance in late 2013.

Headland is the screenwriter of the 2014 remake of the film About Last Night, itself an adaptation of the 1974 David Mamet play Sexual Perversity in Chicago. In 2015, Headland directed Sleeping with Other People based on her own script, which starred Jason Sudeikis and Alison Brie. At the premier of the film, Headland said in an interview with The Wrap that her "elevator" pitch for the movie was, "Like When Harry Met Sally for assholes." The film premiered at the Sundance Film Festival. Headland has directed episodes of the television series Heathers (for which she also served as an executive producer) and two consecutive episodes of the 2016 Starz TV series Blunt Talk, starring Patrick Stewart. She has also directed episodes for SMILF and Black Monday.

=== 2019–present: Television expansion ===
Headland directed four episodes and co-wrote three episodes of Russian Doll, which she co-created for Netflix with Natasha Lyonne and Amy Poehler. Russian Doll was the first television series that Headland co-created, and she was the last of the three women to come on board for the project. The series premiered on February 1, 2019. On the female driven narrative of Russian Doll, Headland stated, "It was really important to explore a show about a female protagonist that asked spiritual and existential questions, as opposed to a show that was about a woman finding romance, a woman finding balance between her personal life and her love life... those are all worthy endeavors and excellent shows are made about all of those things, but we were just thinking 'What hasn't been done?'" Headland alluded to being involved in a second season of Russian Doll, though Lyonne ultimately took over as showrunner.

Headland was hired by Netflix to direct the film Tell Me Everything, a thriller about marriage based on the young adult novel of the same name. She was also set to executive produce and direct a film based on the novel American Huckster: How Chuck Blazer Got Rich From—and Sold Out—the Most Powerful Cabal in World Sports for HBO Films starring Will Ferrell. She was additionally anticipated to executive produce and direct the first episode of the Fox series Sisters. In 2019, she signed a deal with Fox 21 Television Studios.

In June 2023, she was announced as the director of the upcoming adaptation of Taylor Jenkins Reid's 2017 novel The Seven Husbands of Evelyn Hugo.

On April 22, 2020, it was unofficially announced through Variety that Headland would be the showrunner and writer for an upcoming Star Wars series on the Disney+ streaming service. The series would be female-centric and would take place in a different part of the Star Wars timeline than other projects in the franchise. On May 4, 2020 (Star Wars Day), it was officially announced that Headland would write, executive produce, and serve as showrunner for her own Star Wars series for Disney+, entitled The Acolyte, which takes place during the final days of the High Republic. It was revealed in a May 2024 The New York Times interview with Headland that the show cost $180 million (for eight episodes) and took four years to make, with the interviewer, New York Times reporter Brooks Barnes, suggesting the series would attempt to please fans of the original Star Wars and tell an "entirely new story...that showcases women and people of color." Some reviewers called the budget "staggering", "shocking", and "hefty" and compared it to the reported budgets of Game of Thrones, The Mandalorian, Secret Invasion, Citadel, The Lord of the Rings: The Rings of Power, and other series.

On Rotten Tomatoes, the series has an average approval rating of 78% based 246 critics' reviews, and 19% based on 25,000 audience ratings. The Acolyte premiere was reportedly the second biggest for Disney+ in 2024 with 2.94 million views for its first episode in its first two days. The Hollywood Reporter, Coming Soon, The Mary Sue, The Independent, CBR, and The Root reported that the series was "panned" by audiences through review bombing the series on public review sites like Rotten Tomatoes, Metacritic, and IMDb, with some critics saying that those who review-bombed the series were "annoying" and racist. Others, such as Angela Watercutter of Wired, claimed that no review bombing was going on, but that people were only "expressing displeasure" for the series through audience scores. The series was canceled after one season, reportedly because viewership was not "strong enough" for a second season, and, in the view of The Hollywood Reporter, because of people's changing habits when watching streaming series and the erosion of "goodwill of the Star Wars brand" pertaining to its series. Others cited the show's cost as another reason for the show's cancellation. Deadline Hollywood reported that prior to this announcement Headland had indicated in interviews that she had "pitched her ideas for a second season." In September 2025 it was reported by Forbes that the cost of producing The Acolyte was $256.7 million.

In 2025, Headland was nominated for an Emmy for Outstanding Limited Series as an Executive Producer for Dying for Sex.

=== Theatre ===
As a playwright, Headland wrote the Seven Deadly Sins cycle: Cinephillia (lust), Bachelorette (gluttony), Assistance (greed), Surfer Girl (sloth), Reverb (wrath), The Accidental Blonde (envy), and Cult of Love (pride). Part of the inspiration for the Seven Deadly Plays came from her Christian upbringing. Her final play in the series, Cult of Love, opened in 2018. She has also written a neo-noir style play The Layover which received mixed reviews in 2016. Her play Cult of Love opened on Broadway at the Hayes Theatre in the fall of 2024 as part of Second Stage Theater's 2024–2025 season, marking Headland's Broadway debut as a playwright. The play was nominated for the 2026 Outer Critics Circle Award for Outstanding New Broadway Play.

== Influences and themes ==
Leslye Headland was brought up in a strict religious home and grew up watching the Marx Brothers and MGM musicals. Headland notes that Alfred Hitchcock's film Rear Window was the first time she saw the camera as a tool and realized what a director did. Later in life as she was completing her BFA at New York University, Headland notes the difficulty and dark time she faced due to the 9/11 attacks and names David Fincher's Fight Club as the reason she has a lifelong artistic need to make a joke about what is truly painful.

Addiction is a theme that plays heavily into her projects. Regarding her work Headland has stated, "I'm attracted to stories about people who have created prisons for themselves and are trying to get out of them."

== Personal life ==
Headland married actress Rebecca Henderson in September 2016.

== Works ==
=== Film ===
Year	Title	Director	Writer	Producer
2012	Bachelorette	Yes	Yes	Co-producer
2014	About Last Night	No	Yes	No
2015	Sleeping with Other People	Yes	Yes	Co-executive

=== Television ===
Year	Title	Creator	Director	Executive producer	Writer	Notes
2010	Terriers	No	No	No	Yes	2 episodes
2016	Blunt Talk	No	Yes	No	No	2 episodes
2017	SMILF	No	Yes	No	No	3 episodes
2018	Heathers	No	Yes	Pilot	No	4 episodes
2019	Black Monday	No	Yes	No	No	2 episodes
2019	Almost Family	No	Pilot	Yes	No	
2019–22	Russian Doll	Co-creator	Yes	Yes	Yes	Wrote 3 episodes and directed 4 episodes
2022–23	Single Drunk Female	No	Yes	Yes	No	2 episodes
2024	The Acolyte	Yes	Yes	Yes	Yes	2 episodes
2025	Dying for Sex	No	No	Yes	No	

=== Theater ===
As a playwright

Year	Title	Premiered Venue	Ref.
2007	Cinephillia	IAMA Theatre Company, Los Angeles	
2008	Bachelorette	IAMA Theatre Company, Los Angeles	
2008	Assistance	IAMA Theatre Company, Los Angeles	
2008	Surfer Girl	IAMA Theatre Company, Los Angeles	
2009	Reverb	IAMA Theatre Company, Los Angeles	
2010	Bachelorette	Second Stage Theater, Off-Broadway	
2010	The Accidental Blonde	IAMA Theatre Company, Los Angeles	
2011	Reverb	Goodman Theater, Chicago	
2012	Assistance	Playwrights Horizons, Off-Broadway	
2016	The Layover	Second Stage Theater, Off-Broadway	
2018	Surfer Girl	Foley Gallery, Off-Broadway	
2018	Cult of Love	IAMA Theatre Company, Los Angeles	
2024	Cult of Love	Berkeley Repertory Theatre, Berkeley, CA	
2024	Cult of Love	Second Stage's Helen Hayes Theater, Broadway	

== Awards and nominations ==
Year	Award	Category	Work	Result	Ref.
2012	Locarno International Film Festival Awards	Variety Piazza Grande Award	Bachelorette	Nominated	
2015	Nantucket Film Festival	New Voices in Screenwriting Award		Won	
2015	Tribeca Film Festival Awards	Audience Award, Narrative	Sleeping with Other People	Nominated	
2019	Primetime Emmy Awards	Outstanding Comedy Series	Russian Doll	Nominated	
2019	Primetime Emmy Awards	Outstanding Writing for a Comedy Series	Russian Doll (for "Nothing in This World Is Easy")	Nominated	
2019	Gotham Awards	Breakthrough Series – Short Form	Russian Doll	Nominated	
2020	Hugo Awards	Best Dramatic Presentation (Long Form)	Russian Doll	Nominated	
2020	Nebula Awards	Ray Bradbury Award	Russian Doll (for "The Way Out")	Nominated	
2020	Writers Guild of America Awards	Comedy Series	Russian Doll	Nominated	
2020	Writers Guild of America Awards	New Series	Russian Doll	Nominated	
2025	Primetime Emmy Awards	Outstanding Limited or Anthology Series	Dying for Sex	Nominated	
2025	Outer Critics Circle Award	Outstanding New Broadway Play	Cult of Love	Nominated	

== See also ==
- List of female film and television directors
- List of lesbian filmmakers
- Harvey Weinstein sexual abuse cases
