= Curveball (film) =

2020 film

- Film poster
- Directed by: Johannes Naber
- Written by: Oliver Keidel, Johannes Naber
- Produced by: Amir Hamz, Christian Springer, Fahri Yardim
- Starring: Sebastian Blomberg, Dar Salim, Virginia Kull
- Cinematography: Sten Mende
- Edited by: Anne Jünemann
- Music by: Johannes Naber
- Release date: 27 February 2020 (Berlin)
- Running time: 108 minutes
- Country: Germany
- Language: German

Curveball is a 2020 German political satire film drama directed by Johannes Naber. It is based on true events leading up to the Iraq War of 2003. The film premiered in the Berlinale Special section at the 70th Berlin International Film Festival.

== Plot ==
The film opens with the words: “A true story. Unfortunately.” Wolf, a biological weapons expert and Federal Intelligence Service (BND) agent, is obsessed with the idea that anthrax is still being produced in Iraq despite UN inspections. One day, his superior, Schatz, assigns him as the case officer for the Iraqi asylum seeker Rafid Alwan, who claims to have been part of Saddam Hussein’s secret biological weapons programme as an engineer. A sensation for the BND, which has not exactly been blessed with success: at last, they would be one step ahead of the CIA. However, there is no evidence. But the search for it is difficult, because Rafid Alwan – alias ‘Curveball’ – knows his own worth. His statements play into the hands of very different interests – the CIA, the German government; everyone uses his incredible story for their own ends. Thus, a fabricated story becomes reality and a lie becomes the truth, setting in motion a chain of events that permanently alters global politics.

== Cast ==
- Sebastian Blomberg as Wolf
- Dar Salim as Rafid Alwan
- Virginia Kull as Leslie
- Michael Wittenborn as Retzlaff
- Thorsten Merten as Schatz
- Franziska Brandmeier as Meg, Wolf's daughter

== Release ==
The film was first screened to the public at the 2020 Berlinale and was released in German cinemas on 9 September 2021, after the originally planned release date in December 2020 had to be postponed due to the COVID-19 pandemic.

== Reception ==
Walli Müller on Norddeutscher Rundfunk describes the film as a “bitterly scathing political satire” and explains: “If the screenwriters had made up the story, one could have a marvellous laugh at this secret service farce featuring double-zero agents. But: it isn’t made up; it basically happened just like that – and that’s when the laughter can really stick in your throat.”

== Awards ==
The film won the Bronze Lola in the category “Best Feature Film” at the 2021 German Film Awards (producers: Amir Hamz, Christian Springer, Fahri Yardim) and the Award for “Best Supporting Actor” (Thorsten Merten) as well as a nomination for “Best Screenplay” (Oliver Keidel, Johannes Naber).
