= Drama Desk Award for Outstanding Lead Performance in a Play =

American theatre award

- Awarded for: Outstanding Lead Performance in a Play
- Location: New York City
- Country: United States
- Presented by: Drama Desk
- First award: 2023
- Currently held by: John Lithgow, Giant; Lesley Manville, Oedipus; (2026)
- Website: dramadesk.org

The Drama Desk Award for Outstanding Lead Performance in a Play is an annual award presented by Drama Desk in recognition of achievements in the theatre across collective Broadway, off-Broadway and off-off-Broadway productions in New York City.

From 1955 to 1974, acting awards were given only for lead performances, without making distinctions between roles in plays and musicals, nor between actors and actresses. From 1975 to 2022, acting awards were presented in eight categories: separate categories by gender; further divided by lead or featured performer; producing four acting awards each for plays and musicals.

In 2023, the Drama Desk organization announced that, starting with that year's awards, the eight acting categories had been retired and replaced with four gender neutral categories with twice the winners and nominees: separate categories by lead or featured performer; producing two acting categories each for plays and musicals. The former awards for Outstanding Actor in a Play and Outstanding Actress in a Play were merged to create this Outstanding Lead Performance in a Play category.

== Winners and nominees ==
Key

and bold indicates the winner.

=== 2020s ===
Year	Actor	Title	Character	Ref.
2023
2023	**Sean Hayes**	**Good Night, Oscar**	**Oscar Levant**	
2023	**Jessica Chastain**	**A Doll's House**	**Nora Helmer**	
2023	Hiran Abeysekera	Life of Pi	Pi	
2023	Kyle Beltran	A Case for the Existence of God	Keith	
2023	Will Brill	A Case for the Existence of God	Ryan	
2023	Brittany Bradford	Wedding Band	Julia Augustine	
2023	Sharon D. Clarke	Death of a Salesman	Linda Loman	
2023	Denise Manning	Amani	Amani	
2023	Audra McDonald	Ohio State Murders	Suzanne Alexander	
2023	Wendell Pierce	Death of a Salesman	Willy Loman	
2023	John Douglas Thompson	Endgame	Hamm	
2023	Kara Young	Twelfth Night	Viola	
2024
2024	**Jessica Lange**	**Mother Play**	**Phyllis**	
2024	**Sarah Paulson**	**Appropriate**	**Antoinette "Toni" Lafayette**	
2024	Nicole Cooper	Macbeth (an undoing)	Lady Macbeth	
2024	William Jackson Harper	Primary Trust	Kenneth	
2024	Rachel McAdams	Mary Jane	Mary Jane	
2024	Tobias Menzies	The Hunt	Lucas	
2024	Leslie Odom, Jr.	Purlie Victorious	Purlie Victorious Judson	
2024	A.J. Shively	Philadelphia, Here I Come!	Gareth “Gar” O’Donnell	
2024	Juliet Stevenson	The Doctor	Ruth Wolff	
2024	Michael Stuhlbarg	Patriots	Boris Berezovsky	
2025
2025	**Laura Donnelly**	**The Hills of California**	**Veronica / Joan**	
2025	**Sarah Snook**	**The Picture of Dorian Gray**	**Performer**	
2025	Betsy Aidem	The Ask	Greta	
2025	Patsy Ferran	A Streetcar Named Desire	Blanche DuBois	
2025	Danny J. Gomez	All of Me	Alfonso	
2025	Doug Harris	Redeemed	Trevor Barlow	
2025	Patrick Keleher	Fatherland	Jackson	
2025	Louis McCartney	Stranger Things: The First Shadow	Henry Creel	
2025	Lily Rabe	Ghosts	Mrs. Helen Alving	
2025	Jay O. Sanders	Henry IV (Theatre for a New Audience)	Falstaff	
2025	Paul Sparks	Grangeville	Jerry	
2025	Olivia Washington	Wine in the Wilderness	Tomorrow “Tommy” Marie	
2026
2026	**John Lithgow**	**Giant**	**Roald Dahl**	
2026	**Lesley Manville**	**Oedipus**	**Jocasta**	
2026	Noah Galvin	The Reservoir	Josh	
2026	Synnøve Karlsen	Pygmalion	Eliza Doolittle	
2026	John Krasinski	Angry Alan	Roger	
2026	Nathan Lane	Death of a Salesman	Willy Loman	
2026	Quincy Tyler Bernstine	Well, I'll Let You Go	Maggie	
2026	Laurie Metcalf	Death of a Salesman	Linda Loman	
2026	Aigner Mizzelle	The Monsters	Lil	
2026	Patrick Page	Titus Andronicus	Titus Andronicus	
2026	Anika Noni Rose	The Balusters	Kyra Marshall	
2026	Kara Young	Gruesome Playground Injuries	Kayleen	

== Multiple nominations ==
2 nominations

- Kara Young
