= The Bleeding House =

- Directed by: Philip Gelatt
- Written by: Philip Gelatt
- Produced by: Will Battersby; Tory Tunnell; Per Melita
- Starring: Alexandra Chando; Patrick Breen; Charlie Hewson
- Cinematography: Frederic Fasano
- Edited by: Benton Bagswell
- Music by: Hildur Guðnadóttir
- Production companies: Reno Productions; Safehouse Pictures; Cinergy Pictures
- Distributed by: Tribeca Film
- Release date: April 20, 2011
- Running time: 87 minutes
- Country: United States
- Language: English

The Bleeding House is a 2011 horror film written and directed by Philip Gelatt and starring Alexandra Chando, Patrick Breen and Charlie Hewson.

== Plot ==
The Smith family with a secret past is visited by a sweet-talking southern gentleman who is looking for small town humanity. But they will soon find out kindness towards strangers is not always rewarded and the secretive stranger will find redemption does not always come easy.

== Cast ==
- Alexandra Chando as Gloria Smith / Blackbird
- Patrick Breen as Nick
- Charlie Hewson as Quentin Smith
- Betsy Aidem as Marilyn Smith
- Richard Bekins as Matt Smith
- Nina Lisandrello as Lynne
- Court Young as Officer Schmidt
- Henderson Wade as Officer Bayne
- Victoria Dalpe as Beth

== Production ==
The Bleeding House is director Gelatt's directing debut; he previously worked as a comic book writer. Gelatt said that he wrote the film to be a small production so that he wouldn't be overwhelmed on his first project. The film was shot in Verona, New Jersey, in producer Will Battersby's house. Influences included Nick Cave's Murder Ballads and Flannery O'Connor's Wise Blood. The film was designed not to be hostile to religion but critical of aspects. Chando was cast due to her ability to portray character Gloria's sullen disposition using few spoken lines. In other to get into the character, Gelatt provided Chando with dark, atmospheric music, such as Nine Inch Nails and The Cure.

== Release ==
The film premiered at the Tribeca Film Festival and played theatrically in Los Angeles on May 13, 2011, after being released on video on demand on April 20, 2011. It was released on DVD on August 23, 2011.

== Reception ==
Rotten Tomatoes, a review aggregator, reports that 40% of 5 surveyed critics gave the film a positive review; the average rating was 4.8/10. Dennis Harvey of Variety described it as "not especially scary" but "nonetheless compelling". Robert Abele of the Los Angeles Times called it a "regrettably pretentious horror indie" that delays all explanations to artificially prolong the tension. Nick Schager of Slant Magazine rated it 1.5/4 stars and wrote that the film "work[s] its tired conceit with maximum patience and minimal inventiveness". John Marrone of Bloody Disgusting rated it 3.5/5 stars and wrote, "The Bleeding House trades in the traditional horror aspects for a rich story played out by quality acting". Paul Nicholasi of Dread Central rated it 3.5/5 stars and called it "an unflinching piece of American horror" that uses black humor to punish "a cast filled with vanilla characters ripe for the knife." Terek Puckett of Shock Till You Drop wrote that the film is neither creepy nor suspenseful. Ian Jane of DVD Talk rated it 3.5/5 stars and wrote, "There are a couple of plot wholes here and a couple of logic gaps, but if you appreciate a bit of a slow burn before it all hits the fan and you like character driven horror mixed in with your grue, give this one a chance - you'll like what you find." Darryl Loomis of DVD Verdict wrote, "For his first film, Gelatt doesn't feature a ton of style in The Bleeding House, but it's a solid economical production that makes me believe he has some talent."

Patrick Breen won Best Male Lead at the South African HorrorFest.
