= Philip Gelatt =

American director, screenwriter, producer and video game writer

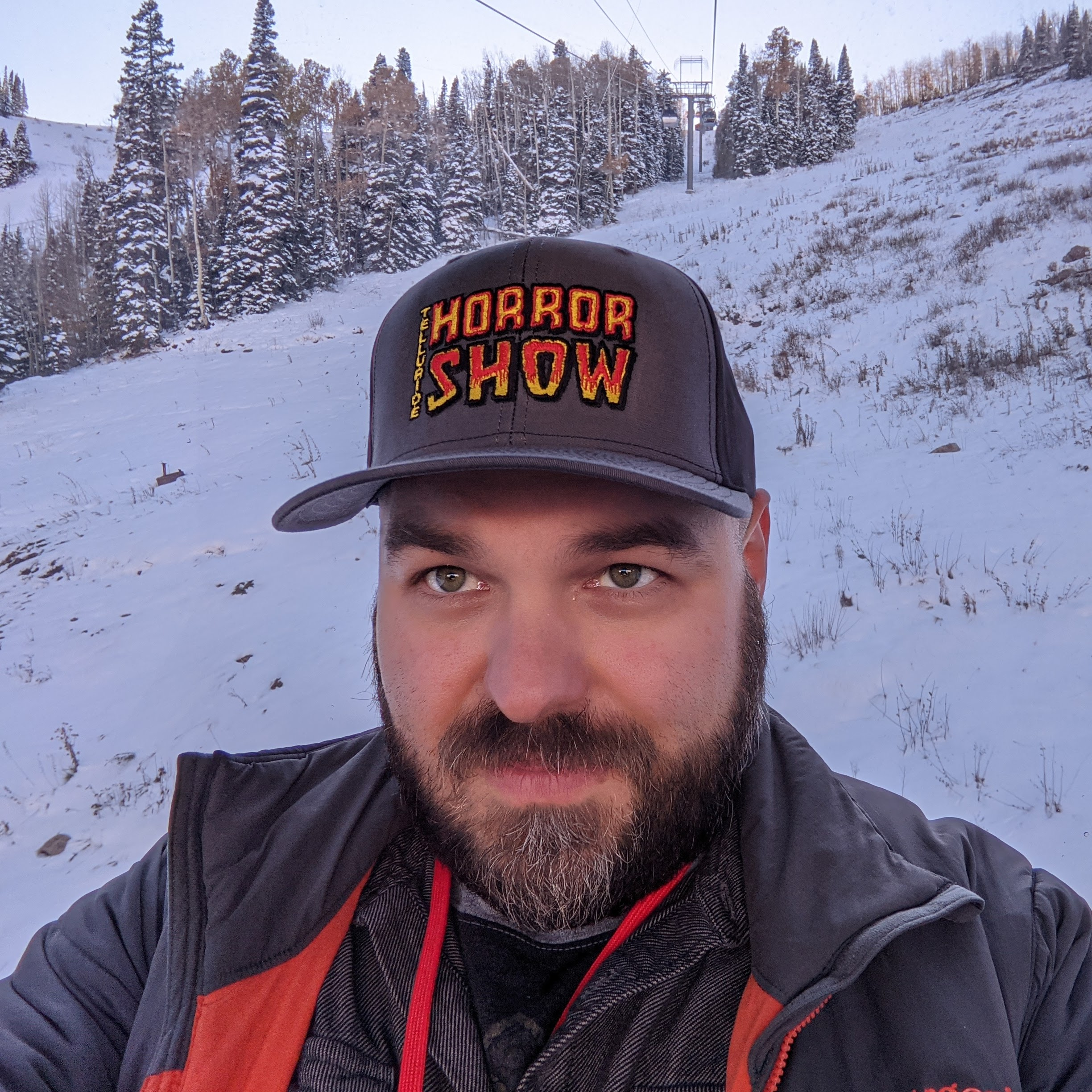
- Gelatt in 2014
- Born: Philip Gelatt Jr. La Crosse, Wisconsin, U.S.
- Occupations: Director; writer; producer; video game writer
- Years active: 2011–present

Philip Gelatt is an American screenwriter, film director, producer and video game writer. He is best known for his work on the animated film, The Spine of Night and the Netflix animated series, Love, Death & Robots.

== Life and career ==
Gelatt was born in La Crosse, Wisconsin. He graduated from New York University in Cinema Studies with a minor in Anthropology and has worked in the comic book industry.

Gelatt's debut feature film, The Bleeding House, premiered at the Tribeca Film Festival in 2011. In 2013, He wrote the science fiction film Europa Report, directed by Sebastián Cordero. Along with Rhianna Pratchett, he co-wrote his debut video game, Rise of the Tomb Raider in 2015. In 2018, he wrote, directed and produced the film They Remain, based on Laird Barron's short story -30-. In 2021, he co-directed and co-wrote the 2D adult animated film The Spine of Night, along with Morgan Galen King, which premiered at South by Southwest.

Gelatt serves as the director of the film track for the bi-annual NecronomiCon Providence.

== Filmography ==
=== Film ===
Year	Title	Director	Writer	Producer
2011	The Bleeding House	Yes	Yes	
2013	Europa Report		Yes	
2018	They Remain	Yes	Yes	Yes
2021	The Spine of Night	Yes	Yes	Yes
2023	Gray Matter	No	Yes	No

=== Television ===
Year	Title	Notes
2020	One Minute Worlds	4 episodes
2019–present	Love, Death & Robots	21 episodes

=== Video games ===
Year	Title	Notes
2015	Rise of the Tomb Raider	Additional writer
2023	Amnesia: The Bunker	Writer
2026	Ontos	Writer

== Publications ==
- 2008 - Indiana Jones Adventures Volume 1 ISBN 978-1-5930790-5-5
- 2008 - Labor Days ISBN 978-1-9326649-2-8
- 2011 - Petrograd ISBN 978-1-9349644-4-6

== Awards and nominations ==
Year	Award	Category	Work	Result	Ref.
2014	Nebula Award	Ray Bradbury Award	Europa Report	Nominated	
2016	Writers Guild of America Awards	Videogame Writing	Rise of the Tomb Raider	Won	
2021	Fantasia International Film Festival	Best Animated Feature	The Spine of Night	Nominated	
2021	Primetime Emmy Awards	Outstanding Short Form Animated Program	Love, Death & Robots	Won	
