= Patrick Breen =

American actor

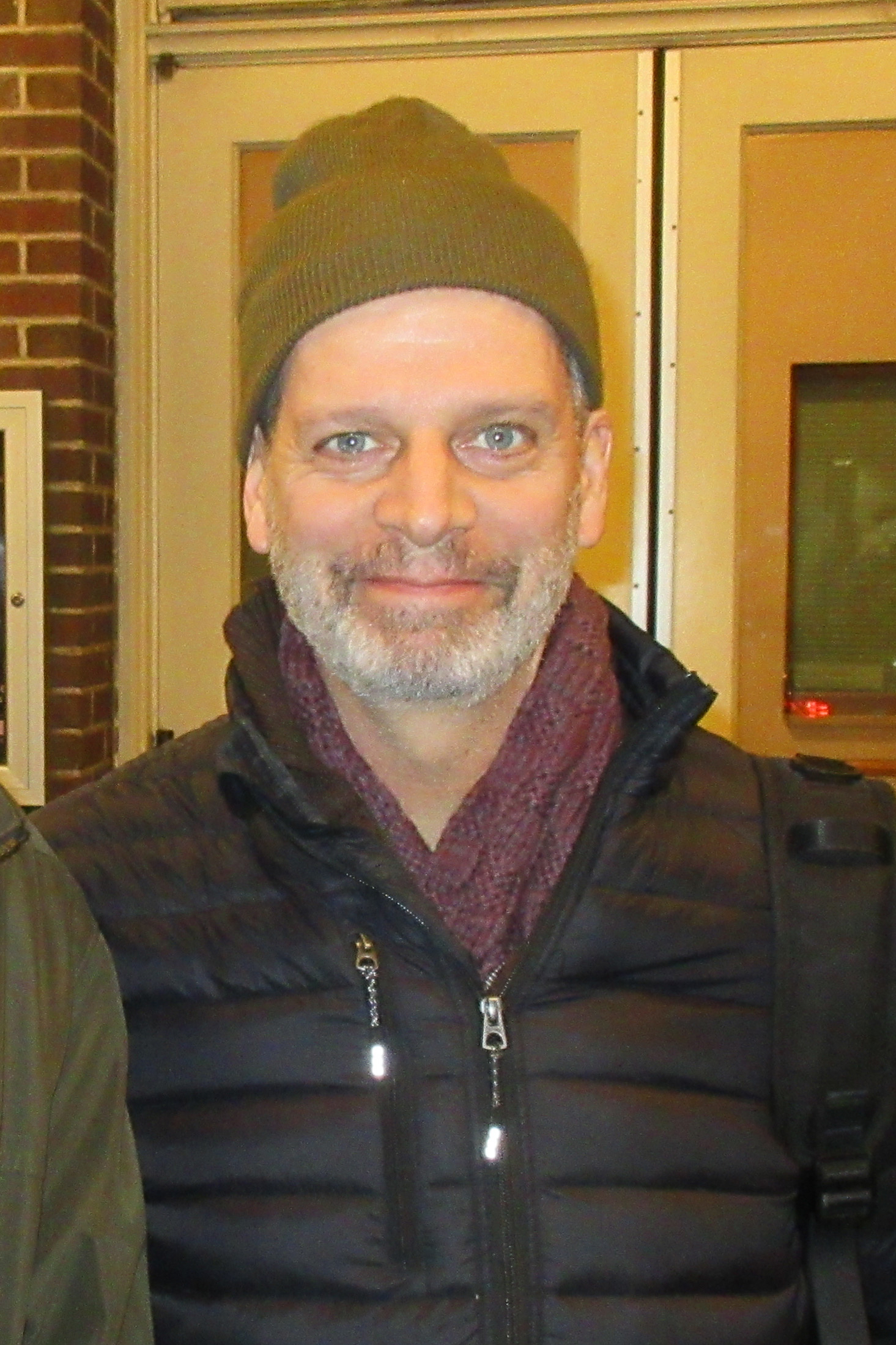
- Born: Joseph Patrick Breen; October 26, 1960 (age 65); Brooklyn, New York, U.S.
- Occupations: Actor, playwright, screenwriter, director
- Years active: 1986–present

Joseph Patrick Breen (born October 26, 1960) is an American actor, playwright, screenwriter, and director.

== Early life ==
Patrick Breen was born in Brooklyn, New York, on October 26, 1960. He attended Tottenville High School in Staten Island.

== Career ==
He has acted primarily on TV, but has also appeared in numerous films, as well as on Broadway and Off Broadway.

In 2010, he starred on Broadway in Next Fall. He played Andrew Munsey, Director of the Central Intelligence Agency, on the CBS drama Madam Secretary.

He was the original voice of Henry The Green Engine, Toby The Tram Engine, and Bertie The Bus in Thomas and the Magic Railroad, but was later replaced by Colm Feore and Kevin Frank respectively.

He voiced all the characters in Britt Allcroft's television series Magic Adventures of Mumfie (except for The Queen of Night who was instead voiced by Allcroft).

Breen appeared in a recurring role as Larry Your-Waiter in Netflix's adaptation of A Series of Unfortunate Events, which premiered in 2017.

== Personal life ==
In a July 2012 interview with Metro Weekly Patrick Breen stated, "I identify as one of the LGBT people" and agreed with the interviewer who referred to Breen coming out as bisexual.

== Filmography ==
=== Film ===
Key
†	Denotes films that have not yet been released

Year	Title	Role	Notes
1989	Day One	Richard Feynman	
1990	Nobody's Perfect	Andy	
1992	Passed Away	Father Hallahan	
1993	For Love or Money	Gary Taubin	
1995	Call of the Wylie	Ezra	Also writer
1995	Get Shorty	Resident Doctor	
1996	Phinehas	Billy	Also writer
1996	Sweet Nothing	Greg	
1996	Mumfie's Quest: The Movie	Narrator	Voice
1997	Beverly Hills Ninja	Desk Manager	Uncredited
1997	Colin Fitz	Gnu Fan	
1997	Men in Black	Reggie Redgick	
1998	One True Thing	G.A. Tweedy	
1999	Just the Ticket	San Diego Vinnie	
1999	Advice from a Caterpillar	Hunter No. 1	
1999	Galaxy Quest	Quellek	
2000	East of A	Peter Parker	Also writer
2000	Thomas and the Magic Railroad	Henry the Green Engine, Toby the Tram Engine, and Bertie the Bus	Voices; original workprint only
2002	Stark Raving Mad	Jeffrey Jay	
2002	Just a Kiss	Peter	Also writer
2003	Radio	Tucker	
2004	Christmas with the Kranks	Aubie	
2007	The Neighbor	Clint	
2008	Space Chimps	Dr. Bob	Voice
2009	Cirque du Freak: The Vampire's Assistant	Mr. Kersey	
2010	Rio Sex Comedy	Frank	
2010	Space Chimps 2: Zartog Strikes Back	Dr. Bob	Voice; direct-to-video
2011	The Bleeding House	Nick	
2014	Draft Day	Bill Zotti	
2014	A Most Violent Year	Instructor	
2017	After Louie	Jeffrey	
2019	The Assistant	Roy	
2020	Milkwater	Roger	
2021	The Spine of Night	Doa	Voice
2023	Trundle and the Lost Borscht of Atlantis	Mr. Murray	Short film
2023	Mindless Kombat	Patrick	Short film
2024	Damn! The Duke Got the Wrong Girl	Security Guard	
2024	Godless	Nico	
2025	Magic Hour	Michael	

=== Television ===
Year(s)	Title	Role	Notes
1986	Spenser: For Hire	Bobby Olak	Episode: "And Give Up Show Biz?"
1987	My Sister Sam	Scotty	Episode: "Club Dread"
1987	The Cavanaughs	Tommy	Episode: "The Arrangement"
1987	Gimme a Break!	Keith Dudley	Episode: "Parents' Week: Parts 1 & 2"
1987	21 Jump Street	Johnny Hartman	Episode: "Low and Away"
1988	Just in Time	Nick Thompson	Main role
1988	Annie McGuire	George	Episode: "The Legend of the Bad Fish"
1990	Monsters	Danny	Episode: "Museum Hearts"
1990	Kojak: None So Blind	Reporter No. 1	Television film
1991	Sunday Dinner	Kenneth Benedict	Main role
1992	Fool's Fire	The Ministers	Television film
1993	Melrose Place	Cameron	3 episodes (season 1)
1993	Fallen Angels	Doc	Episode: "The Quiet Room"
1993	Big Wave Dave's	Richie Lamonica	Main role
1994–1998	Magic Adventures of Mumfie	Narrator (voice)	Main role
1995–1996	Simon	Mitch	Main role
1996	Law & Order	Andrew Gellis	Episode: "Slave"
1996–1997	One Life to Live	Winslow Freeman	2 episodes
1998	Jenny	Richard Marino	Episode: "A Girl's Gotta Merger"
1998	Party of Five	Kevin Quoss	Episodes: "Of Human Bonding", "Here and Now"
1999	Oz	Robbie Gerth	Episodes: "Napoleon's Boney Parts", "Legs"
1999	Sex and the City	Dr. Bradley Meego	Episode: "Twenty-Something Girls vs. Thirty-Something Women"
2001	Jack & Jill	Ken	Episodes: "Caution: Parents Crossing", "And Jack and Jill Came Down the Hill"
2001	Ally McBeal	Kevin Stoller	Episode: "In Search of Barry White"
2001	Frasier	Phillip	Episode: "A Day in May"
2001	Judging Amy	D.A. Levy	Episode: "The Last Word"
2001	The Tick	Friendly Fire	Episode: "Couples"
2001	Will & Grace	Mitchell	Episode: "Stakin' Care of Business"
2001	Kristin	Nicholas Dupres	Episode: "The Rift"
2002	Angel	Nev	Episode: "Birthday"
2002	The West Wing	Kevin Kahn	Episode: "The Black Vera Wang"
2002	Do Over	Mr. Jenkins	Episode: "Investing in the Future"
2003–2004	Rock Me Baby	Richard Crandall	Recurring role, 5 episodes
2003–2004	Joan of Arcadia	Sammy	3 episodes
2002, 2004	Law & Order	Kevin Hobart	Episodes: "The Ring", "Married with Children"
2004	Monk	Jeffery Sweeney	Episode: "Mr. Monk Gets Married"
2004–2005	Kevin Hill	George Weiss	Main role
2006	CSI: Crime Scene Investigation	Mr. Phillipe	Episode: "Way to Go"
2006	Boston Legal	A.D.A. Otto Beedle	3 episodes (season 3)
2007	The New Adventures of Old Christine	Edmund	Episode: "Strange Bedfellows"
2007	Notes from the Underbelly	Pale Husband	Episode: Pilot
2007	Pushing Daisies	Leo Gaswint	Episode: "Pie-lette"
2008	Eli Stone	Paul Sweren	3 episodes
2008	ER	Felix	Episode: "Another Thursday at County"
2009	Captain Cook's Extraordinary Atlas	Phinneas Malloy	Television film
2009	Ghost Whisperer	Duff Faraday	Episode: "Stage Fright"
2009	Three Rivers	Dr. Joseph Breen	Episode: "Good Intentions"
2010	Nurse Jackie	Martin	Episode: "Apple Bong"
2010–2011, 2016	The Good Wife	Lt. Terrence Hicks	3 episodes
2011–2015	Whole Day Down	Patrick Breen	Web series; also co-creator and writer
2012	CSI: Miami	Henry Duncan	Episode: "No Good Deed"
2013	Criminal Minds	Peter Harper	Episode: "The Gathering"
2013	Major Crimes	Dr. Jason Field / Jim Gilmer	Episode: "D.O.A."
2014	Blue Bloods	Joseph Scott	Episode: "Open Secrets"
2014	Those Who Kill	Burkhart	Episode: "Insomnia"
2014	Royal Pains	Bob	Recurring role (season 6), 6 episodes
2014	The Mysteries of Laura	Erik Walden	Episode: Pilot
2014–2015	Madam Secretary	Andrew Munsey	Recurring role (season 1), 10 episodes
2015	The Slap	Malcolm	Episode: "Connie"
2015	Elementary	Vance Ford	Episode: "T-Bone and the Iceman"
2015	Show Me a Hero	Paul W. Pickelle	2 episodes
2016	Law & Order: Special Victims Unit	Doug Nelson	Episode: "Forty-One Witnesses"
2016	BrainDead	Cole Stockwell	3 episodes
2017	Conviction	Clark Sims	Episode: "Black Orchid"
2017	The Blacklist: Redemption	James Burton	Episode: "Hostages"
2017–2019	A Series of Unfortunate Events	Larry Your-Waiter	Recurring role
2021	The Bite	Agent Kermit Rimland	Episodes: "The Fourth Wave", "The Fifth Wave"
2021–2022	Bull	AUSA Reilly	Episodes: "Confidence Man", "The Other Shoe"
2021–2025	Dhar Mann	Various roles	29 episodes
2022	Save It for the Show	Himself	Episode: "Guest Starring Patrick Breen"
2023	The Marvelous Mrs. Maisel	Henry	Episode: "The Princess and the Plea"
2023	American Horror Stories	Auctioneer	Episode: "Organ"
2023	Julia	Henry Haller	Episode: "Shrimp and Grits"
2023–2024	Dhar Mann Bonus	Coworker 2	2 episodes
2024	Feud	Jacob Horn	Episode: "Masquerade 1966"
2024	Evil	Father Dement	2 episodes
2024	Monsters: The Lyle and Erik Menendez Story	Jury Alternative	Episode: "Hang Men"
2024	Elsbeth	Claude Tobia	Episode: "Elsbeth's Eleven"
2025	The Real vs. the Fake Heiress	Guest	Miniseries
2025	President's Daughter Breaks the Casting Couch	Policeman	Miniseries; 48 episodes
2026	The Magnificent Bodyguard	Driver	Miniseries

=== Music videos ===
Year	Song	Artist
2025	"Simple Girl"	Remy Bond

== Stage work ==
- Brighton Beach Memoirs (1983)
- The Substance of Fire (1991)
- Fuddy Meers (1999)
- Next Fall (2009, Off Broadway; 2010, Broadway)
- The Normal Heart (2011, Broadway)
- The Perplexed (2020, Broadway)
