= Primary Trust =

2023 play by Eboni Booth

- Original language: English
- Written by: Eboni Booth
- Genre: Drama
- Setting: Cranberry Lake, New York; 1990s

Premiere
- Date: May 4, 2023
- Place: Laura Pels Theatre

Primary Trust is a dramatic stage play written by American playwright Eboni Booth. The production premiered off-Broadway at the Laura Pels Theatre in 2023 and starred William Jackson Harper who received the Obie Award. The play was awarded the Pulitzer Prize for Drama in 2024 and was one of the most-produced plays in the U.S. in 2025-2026.

== Summary ==
The play tells the story of Kenneth, a 30-something African-American suburban bookstore worker in a fictional suburb of Rochester, New York with an imaginary friend who embarks on a journey of self-discovery. After being laid off from his long-time job, he applies for a job as a teller at Primary Trust Bank.

== Production history ==
=== Off-Broadway (2023) ===
The play premiered Off-Broadway at the Laura Pels Theatre, produced by the Roundabout Theatre Company, with support from The Laura Pels International Foundation for Theater and the Edgerton Foundation. The production was directed by Knud Adams. William Jackson Harper won an Obie Award for distinguished performance, and the play was nominated for Outstanding Play by the Lucille Lortel Awards. He also received nominations for the Drama Desk Award for Outstanding Lead Performance in a Play and the Drama League Distinguished Performance Award.

=== Signature Theatre (2024) ===
The play received its regional premiere at Signature Theatre in Arlington, VA, running from Sept 10-Oct 20, 2024 in the ARK Theatre, and directed by Taylor Reynolds.

=== Barrington Stage Company (2024) ===
The closing play of the season at Barrington Stage Company, the play ran from Sept 18–Oct 13, 2024 at the St. Germain Stage in Pittsfield, MA.

=== La Jolla Playhouse (2024) ===
The play premiered at the La Jolla Playhouse in San Diego, as a West Coast premiere, with a run of Sept 24-Oct 20, 2024, again directed by Knud Adams.

=== Chicago (2024) ===
The Goodman Theatre in Chicago announced the play's regional premiere as part of the 2024-25 season. It ran from October 5 to November 3, 2024.

=== Seattle (2024) ===
The play ran at the Seattle Repertory Theatre from October 24 to November 27, 2024. It was directed by Kaytlin McIntyre.

Cincinnati, OH (2025)

Cincinnati Playhouse in the Park's production of Primary Trust, co-produced with McCarter Theatre Center, was directed by Timothy Douglas and ran February 1–23, 2025.

=== Baltimore, MD (2025) ===
Everyman Theatre, Baltimore announced their production will be directed by Reginald L. Douglas and run February 2-March 2, 2025.

=== Vancouver, Canada (2025) ===
The Arts Club Theatre Company announced their production of Primary Trust will be directed by Ashlie Corcoran, and run February 6–March 2, 2025.

=== Houston, Texas (2025) ===
Alley Theatre announced their production of Primary Trust will be directed by Niegel Smith, and run May 2-May 25, 2025.

=== Dallas, TX (2025) ===
Dallas Theater Center announced their production of Primary Trust will be directed by Sasha Maya Ada and run February 27 through March 23, 2025.

=== Burlington, VT (2025) ===
Vermont Stage Company's production of Primary Trust was directed Jammie Patton and ran March 19-April 6, 2025.

Princeton, NJ (2025)

McCarter Theatre Center's production of Primary Trust, co-produced by Cincinnati Playhouse in the Park, was directed by Timothy Douglas and ran May 8–25, 2025.

=== Boston, MA (2025) ===
SpeakEasy Stage Company's production of Primary Trust was directed by Dawn M. Simmons and ran September 12-October 11, 2025.

=== Los Angeles, CA (2026) ===
Center Theatre Group's production of Primary Trust was directed again by Knud Adams and ran May 20-June 28, 2026, at the Mark Taper Forum.

== Original cast and characters ==
Character	Off-Broadway (2023)	Signature (2024)	La Jolla (2024)	Goodman (2024)	Everyman (2025)	Alley Theatre (2025)	Mark Taper Forum (2026)
Kenneth	William Jackson Harper	Julius Thomas III	Caleb Eberhardt	Namir Smallwood	RJ Brown	Stanley Andrew Jackson	Petey McGee
Bert	Eric Berryman	Frank Britton	James Udom	Charles Andrew Gardner	Louis E. Davis	David Rainey	Ugo Chukwu
Corrina / Others	April Matthis	Yesenia Iglesias	Rebecca S'Manga Frank	Christiana Clark	Andreá Bellamore	Michelle Elaine	Rebecca S'Manga Frank
Clay / Others	Jay O. Sanders	Craig Wallace	James Urbaniak	Fred Zimmerman	Jefferson A. Russell	Chris Hutchison	James Urbankiak

== Awards and nominations ==
=== 2023 Off-Broadway production ===
Year	Award	Category	Nominee	Result	Ref.
2024	Pulitzer Prize	Pulitzer Prize for Drama		Won	
2024	Drama Desk Award	Outstanding Lead Performer in a Play	William Jackson Harper	Nominated	
2024	Drama League Awards	Distinguished Performance	William Jackson Harper	Nominated	
2024	Lucille Lortel Award	Outstanding Play		Nominated	
2024	Lucille Lortel Award	Outstanding Lead Performer in a Play	William Jackson Harper	Nominated	
2024	Obie Awards	Performance	William Jackson Harper	Won	
2024	Obie Awards	Sustained Achievement in Design	Mikaal Sulaiman	Won	
2024	Outer Critics Circle Awards	Outstanding New Off-Broadway Play		Won	
2024	Outer Critics Circle Awards	Outstanding Lead Performer in an Off-Broadway Play	William Jackson Harper	Won	
2024	Outer Critics Circle Awards	Outstanding Featured Performer in an Off-Broadway Play	April Matthis	Nominated	
2024	Outer Critics Circle Awards	Outstanding Featured Performer in an Off-Broadway Play	Jay O. Sanders	Won	
2024	Outer Critics Circle Awards	Outstanding Direction of a Play	Knud Adams	Nominated	
