= Cry Wolf (American TV series) =

American television series

- Genre: Drama
- Created by: Sarah Treem
- Based on: Ulven kommer by Maja Jul Larsen
- Showrunner: Sarah Treem
- Directed by: Anne Sewitsky; Rodrigo García; Daina Reid
- Starring: Olivia Colman; Brie Larson; Shawn Hatosy; Alyvia Alyn Lind; Jack Greig; William Jackson Harper; Ayo Solanke; Jon Tenney; Crosby Baylen
- Country of origin: United States
- Original language: English

Production
- Executive producers: Sarah Treem; Olivia Colman; Brie Larson; Ed Sinclair; Kim Todd; Rodrigo García; Melissa Bernstein; Alena Smith; Maja Jul Larsen; Christian Rank; Claudia Saganario
- Cinematography: Si Bell; Igor Jadue-Lillo
- Editor: Scott van Beever
- Production companies: South of the River Pictures; Special Interests; DR Sales; FX Productions

Original release
- Network: FX

Cry Wolf is an upcoming television miniseries created by Sarah Treem and starring Brie Larson, Olivia Colman and Shawn Hatosy.

== Premise ==
A social worker and a mother are thrust into crisis when the mother’s teenage daughter alleges abuse, pushing both women to their limits as they navigate an impossible situation.

== Cast ==
=== Main ===
- Brie Larson as April
- Olivia Colman as Kath
- Shawn Hatosy as April’s husband and Mia’s stepfather
- Alyvia Alyn Lind as Mia
- Jack Greig as April's son and Mia's half brother
- William Jackson Harper as Arthur
- Jon Tenney as Ian Farr
- Ayo Solanke as Austin

=== Recurring ===
- Dane DeHaan
- Atticus Mitchell as Nick, Kath's son
- Elizabeth Perkins
- Crosby Baylen as Elliot, Kath's grandson

== Production ==
=== Development ===
In February 2025, it was reported that a project based on the 2020 Danish series Ulven kommer was in development at FX, with Olivia Colman set to star and executive produce and Sarah Treem set to create, executive produce, and showrun the series.

The limited series was given the greenlight in July 2025, with Brie Larson joining as star and also executive produce along with Treem, Colman via South of the River Pictures with Ed Sinclair, Rodrigo García, Melissa Bernstein of Special Interests, and Alena Smith, Maja Jul Larsen, who created the original series, and Christian Rank and Claudia Saganario of DR Sales.

=== Casting ===
On December 5, 2025, Deadline reported that Shawn Hatosy joined the cast and four days later, Alyvia Alyn Lind and Jack Greig also joined. On January 13, 2026, William Jackson Harper joined the cast. Dane DeHaan, Atticus Mitchell, Ayo Solanke and Elizabeth Perkins joined the cast in recurring roles on February 9, 2026. On May 29, 2026, Jon Tenney joined the cast.

=== Filming ===
Filming took place in Toronto from February 2026, scheduled to last into May, with Anne Sewitsky, Rodrigo García, and Daina Reid as directors and Si Bell and Igor Jadue-Lillo as cinematographers.

=== Post-production ===
Scott van Beever serves as editor of the series.
