= Eboni Booth =

American playwright and actress

- Born: New York City, New York, U.S.
- Education: University of Vermont (BA); Juilliard School (GrDip)
- Awards: Pulitzer Prize for Drama; Drama Desk Award; Outer Critics Circle Award

Eboni Booth is an American playwright and actress. She won the 2024 Pulitzer Prize for Drama for her play, Primary Trust.

== Career ==
Booth's first experience in theatre came as a child performing in Charlie and the Chocolate Factory at Lehman College and attending sleepaway camps for theatre. She eventually enrolled in New York City's Fiorello H. LaGuardia High School, and later studied at the University of Vermont, and received a Juilliard Playwrighting Fellowship. She has been a resident playwright at New Dramatists and was a recipient of the Steinberg Playwright Grant in 2021.She also studied playwrighting at the Primary Stages Einhorn School of Performing Arts.

In 2020, her first play, Paris, premiered Off-Broadway at the Atlantic Theatre Company. The play follows the story of working-class employees at a big box store in the titular town in Vermont. The show received positive reviews, with The New York Times calling it "coolly observant" and a "realistically acted, astutely written play." For her work, she was awarded the Helen Merrill Award for Playwriting. and the John Gassner Award For New American Plays by the Outer Critics Circle Awards.

Her play Primary Trust debuted Off-Broadway at the Laura Pels Theatre to critical success, including nominations for the Lucille Lortel Award for Outstanding New Play. The play was awarded the Pulitzer Prize for Drama in 2024.

== Plays ==
- Paris
- Primary Trust

== Filmography ==
Year	Title	Role	Notes	Ref.
1994	No Adults Allowed	Nancy		
2012	Stolen Voices, Buried Secrets	Tosha Lampkin	Episode: "Caught on Tape"	
2015	Daredevil	Reporter	2 episodes	
2015	Show Me a Hero	Reporter	2 episodes	
2018	The Americans	Janine Aderholt	2 episodes	
2019	The Punisher	Reporter	Episode: "Collision Course"	
2019	The Good Fight	Isabella Burns	3 episodes	
2019	Instinct	Sandy	Episode: "Broken Record"	
2019	Lo: The New Adventures of Ultimate Man's Ex-Girlfriend	Lo	Main role	
2020	The Surrogate	Samantha		
2020	Come Play	Dr. Robyn		
2022	Julia	Staff Writer	8 episodes	
2024	We Were The Lucky Ones	Writer, Co-Producer	Episode: "Warsaw"	
2026	Disclosure Day	Dr. Coleman		
TBD	Last Night at the Lobster	Writer		

== Stage credits ==
Year	Title	Role	Venue	Ref.
2017	Sundown, Yellow Moon	Performer	Off-Broadway, Ars Nova	
2017	Fulfillment Center	Madeleine	Off-Broadway, Manhattan Theatre Club	
2017	After the Blast	Carrie	Off-Broadway, Lincoln Center Theatre	
2018	Dance Nation	Zuzu	Off-Broadway, Playwrights Horizons	
2020	Paris	Playwright	Off-Broadway, Atlantic Theatre Company	
2023	Primary Trust	Playwright	Off-Broadway, Roundabout Theatre Company	

== Awards and nominations ==
Year	Award	Category	Work	Result	Ref.
2019	Drama Desk Award	Ensemble Award	Dance Nation	Won	
2019	Drama League Award	Distinguished Performance	Dance Nation	Nominated	
2020	Outer Critics Circle Award	John Gassner Award	Paris	Honored	
2021	Helen Merrill Award for Playwriting		Paris	Won	
2024	Pulitzer Prize for Drama		Primary Trust	Won	
2024	Lucille Lortel Award	Outstanding Play	Primary Trust	Nominated	
