= Europa Report =

2013 US science fiction film directed by Sebastián Cordero

- Theatrical release poster
- Directed by: Sebastián Cordero
- Written by: Philip Gelatt
- Produced by: Ben Browning; Kevin Misher
- Starring: Christian Camargo; Anamaria Marinca; Michael Nyqvist; Daniel Wu; Karolina Wydra; Sharlto Copley; Embeth Davidtz; Dan Fogler; Isiah Whitlock, Jr.
- Cinematography: Enrique Chediak
- Edited by: Aaron Yanes; Alexander Kopit; Craig McKay; Livio Sanchez
- Music by: Bear McCreary
- Production companies: Start Motion Pictures; Wayfare Entertainment Ventures LLC
- Distributed by: Magnet Releasing; Magnolia Pictures
- Release dates: June 27, 2013 (VOD); August 2, 2013 (United States)
- Running time: 90 minutes
- Country: United States
- Language: English
- Budget: <$10 million
- Box office: $125,687

Europa Report is a 2013 American science fiction film directed by Sebastián Cordero and written by Philip Gelatt. It stars Christian Camargo, Anamaria Marinca, Michael Nyqvist, Daniel Wu, Karolina Wydra, and Sharlto Copley. A found footage film, it recounts the fictional story of the first crewed mission to Europa, one of the four Galilean moons of Jupiter. Despite a disastrous technical failure that causes the loss of all communications with Earth, and a series of further crises, the crew continues its mission to Europa and finds mounting evidence of life on the moon.

== Plot ==
Dr. Samantha Unger, CEO of Europa Ventures, narrates the story of the Europa One mission. Six astronauts embark on a privately funded mission to Jupiter's moon Europa in an attempt to find extraterrestrial life. The crew members are commander William Xu, pilot Rosa Dasque, chief science officer Daniel Luxembourg, marine biology science officer Katya Petrovna, junior engineer James Corrigan, and chief engineer Andrei Blok.

After six months of mission time, a solar storm hits the ship, knocking out communication with mission control. Blok and Corrigan perform an extravehicular activity (EVA) to repair the system from outside, but an accident rips Blok's suit. While he is being guided back into the airlock, Blok notices that Corrigan's suit has been coated with hydrazine and he cannot enter the airlock or else he would contaminate the rest of the ship. Blok attempts to save Corrigan by taking him out of his suit, but he blacks out from a lack of oxygen. Knowing there is no hope for himself, Corrigan pushes Blok into the airlock, thus propelling himself away from the ship. Stranded, he dies in space; the crew continue with the mission, demoralized by Corrigan's death.

After twenty months, the ship goes into orbit around Europa. Its lander lands safely on Europa, but misses its target zone. The crew drills through the ice and releases a probe into the underlying sea. Blok, who is sleep-deprived to the point of concerning the rest of the crew, sees a light outside the ship; he is unable to record it or otherwise convince the crew of its occurrence. The probe is struck by an unknown luminous object and contact with it is lost.

Petrovna insists on collecting samples on Europa's surface; the crew votes and she is allowed to go. Analyzing the samples, Luxembourg discovers traces of a unicellular organism. Petrovna sees a blue light in the distance and decides to investigate it. As she approaches the light, the ice below her breaks and she falls through. Her head-mounted camera continues to broadcast, displaying her last moments as blue light is reflected in her eyes. The camera broadcast then cuts out.

The crew agrees to leave to report their discovery to Earth, but the engines malfunction. As the lander hurtles back to Europa's surface, Xu unbuckles from his seat to dump water shielding to reduce the impact speed. The ship crashes at the originally targeted landing site. On impact, Xu is killed and the lander is damaged, leaking oxygen and losing heat. It begins to sink into the ice.

Blok and Luxembourg put their EVA suits on to make repairs outside the ship. Luxembourg tries to descend but dies as he falls through the ice. Blok knows that there is no chance that he alone will be able to repair the lander before it sinks. Instead, he manages to fix the communication link to the orbiting mother ship, at the expense of turning off the life support systems. Like Petrovna, he sees a blue light and is killed as he falls through the ice.

Alone now, Dasque re-establishes communication with Earth; all the collected images and data that have been saved since the solar storm are relayed to Earth via the mothership. The ice cracks and the lander begins to sink. Anticipating her death, Dasque opens the airlock to flood the lander in hopes of revealing the source of the light. As the water rises to the cockpit, she sees a tentacled, bioluminescent creature rising toward her before the camera cuts out.

In the epilogue, narrator Samantha Unger confirms that the crew of Europa discovered life as footage plays from an earlier scene of the crew posing in front of the camera.

== Cast ==
- Anamaria Marinca as Rosa Dasque
- Michael Nyqvist as Andrei Blok
- Karolina Wydra as Katya Petrovna
- Daniel Wu as William Xu
- Sharlto Copley as James Corrigan
- Christian Camargo as Daniel Luxembourg
- Embeth Davidtz as Dr. Samantha Unger
- Dan Fogler as Dr. Nikita Solokov
- Isiah Whitlock, Jr. as Dr. Tarik Pamuk

== Production ==
Filming took place in Brooklyn, New York. The first image from the film was revealed on February 11, 2012. A website to promote the film was launched shortly afterward.

The screenplay was written by Philip Gelatt and the production design was done by Eugenio Caballero. It was scored by Bear McCreary. The movie is a found footage film and follows a nonlinear progression.

The crew used as inspiration real footage from the International Space Station and space walks from the Space Shuttle. The space ship was designed through computer graphics, giving high detail to the camera angles to be used in the film. Weightlessness was simulated with balance balls; suspension from wires was used for interior shots. The flooding ship was filmed on a one-third scale model.

For accuracy, the depiction of Europa was based on data from NASA and Jet Propulsion Laboratory (JPL) maps of the moon's surface. The creature was designed to be bioluminescent starting with the initial concepts. The visual effects supervisor stated that the creature was based on a cross of an octopus and a squid, with early sketches resembling a jellyfish and a manta ray.

An online trailer was released on May 20, 2012. The film was released on Video on Demand, iTunes, and Google Play Movies & TV on June 27, 2013. It was released theatrically on August 2, 2013.

== Reception ==
Europa Report has received generally positive reviews from critics. On the review aggregator website Rotten Tomatoes, 81% of 80 critics' reviews are positive. The website's consensus reads: "Claustrophobic and stylish, Europa Report is a slow-burning thriller that puts the science back into science fiction." Metacritic, which uses a weighted average, assigned the film a score of 68 out of 100, based on 25 critics, indicating "generally favorable" reviews.

Jeannette Catsoulis, writing for The New York Times, liked that the movie worked to stay realistic, and found the pairing of Caballero's production design and Chediak's cinematography to be effective.

Justin Chang, of Variety magazine, called the film a "reasonably plausible and impressively controlled achievement". while Space.com said the film was "[one] of the most thrilling and realistic depictions of space exploration since Moon or 2001: A Space Odyssey". Fearnet said the film was "One of the most sincere, suspenseful and fascinating science fiction films of the past few years".

The film was nominated for the Bradbury Award by the members of Science Fiction and Fantasy Writers of America.

== See also ==
- List of films featuring extraterrestrials
- Jupiter's moons in fiction
