= Bachelorette (film) =

- Theatrical release poster
- Directed by: Leslye Headland
- Written by: Leslye Headland
- Based on: Bachelorette by Leslye Headland
- Produced by: Jessica Elbaum; Will Ferrell; Adam McKay; Brice Dal Farra; Claude Dal Farra; Lauren Munsch
- Starring: Kirsten Dunst; Isla Fisher; Lizzy Caplan; James Marsden; Kyle Bornheimer; Rebel Wilson; Adam Scott
- Cinematography: Doug Emmett
- Edited by: Jeffrey Wolf
- Music by: Andrew Feltenstein; John Nau
- Production companies: BCDF Pictures; Gary Sanchez Productions
- Distributed by: RADiUS-TWC
- Release dates: January 23, 2012 (Sundance); September 7, 2012 (United States)
- Running time: 87 minutes
- Country: United States
- Language: English
- Budget: $3 million
- Box office: $12.1 million

Bachelorette is a 2012 American comedy film written and directed by Leslye Headland, adapted from her play of the same name. It stars Kirsten Dunst, Lizzy Caplan, and Isla Fisher as three troubled women who reunite for the wedding of a friend (played by Rebel Wilson) who was ridiculed in high school. The play upon which the film is based was originally written as one of Headland's cycle of "Seven Deadly Sins" plays.

The film wrapped production in New York, and premiered at the Sundance Film Festival on January 23, 2012. It received a limited release in the United States on September 7, 2012.

== Plot ==
Regan Crawford is having lunch with her longtime friend, Becky Archer, who reveals that she will marry her boyfriend, Dale. Although secretly jealous of the fact that her friend is now engaged, Regan notifies their two other friends Gena Myers and Katie Lawrence.

Six months later, the women are preparing for Becky's bachelorette party that evening; Gena flies from Los Angeles to New York City, and the four meet at the hotel, where Katie announces that Gena has brought cocaine for them all. At the dinner party that night, Gena runs into her ex Clyde, whom she sees flirting with Dale's younger sister, and Katie runs into Joe, a former classmate and pot dealer. Trevor, the best man, gives a speech at the party, and Gena says in her toast that she once caught Becky forcing herself to throw up in the high school bathrooms.

After the dinner, the women go to their suite, where Katie's co-worker arrives and does a striptease for them, but Becky stops it after he jokingly calls her "Pigface", a cruel high school nickname. She leaves the bachelorette party, and Regan, Gena and Katie stay in the room where they keep drinking and doing cocaine. Drunk and high, the three accidentally rip Becky's bridal gown, and Katie stains it with a nosebleed.

Regan contacts a friend who owns a bridal store, who reluctantly agrees to open it for them in the middle of the night. After unsuccessfully searching the store for a dress for Becky, Katie reveals that she can sew, which leads them on a hunt for thread and a sewing machine. Trevor text messages Regan, inviting them to stop by the strip club where the men are, which they agree to. Gena takes the dress into the strip club's bathroom where she attempts to clean it; there, she has a conversation with a stripper who uses the dress as a towel and toilet paper.

Regan, furious over the situation, gets into an argument with Gena who insists they confess everything to Becky, and it is revealed in the argument that Gena had an abortion. Gena leaves the club with Clyde and the dress.

Meanwhile, Joe attempts to woo Katie, who is heavily intoxicated and high on cocaine, and Regan ends up having sex with Trevor in the strip club bathroom. Clyde and Gena spend the evening together reminiscing and have sex. Meanwhile, Joe and Katie spend the night in the hotel swimming pool, where Katie reveals that she attempted suicide the year before. Becky calls and asks Regan to come to her room so they can talk; in their conversation, it is revealed that Regan is bulimic, and that Becky covered it for her in high school. Just as Regan begins to tell Becky about her dress, Becky's mother arrives, and they begin to prepare for the wedding.

Gena and Clyde head to the wedding in the morning while the party planners can't find the dress. Gena asks a maid at the hotel to help her to touch-up the dress before bringing it to Becky; meanwhile, Katie locks herself in the bathroom and overdoses on Xanax. While Regan forces Katie to vomit the pills, she ends up puking all over Regan's dress. To buy time, Regan convinces Becky to ride to the wedding in her pajamas and put on the dress when she arrives. Irate, Becky screams at her mother and Regan in the taxi. Gena arrives to the wedding with the dress. It's been completely cleaned except for a tiny bloodstain.

Becky walks down the aisle while Regan and Gena sit on a bench and watch the ceremony, where they are joined by Katie, who arrives late. At the reception, Joe and Katie talk and kiss, Regan tries to sleep, and Clyde gives an obscene speech about having sex with Gena the night before. The film ends as the four women make up and dance together at the reception.

== Cast ==
- Kirsten Dunst as Regan Crawford
- Lizzy Caplan as Gena Myers
- Isla Fisher as Katie Lawrence
- Rebel Wilson as Becky Archer
- Kyle Bornheimer as Joe
- James Marsden as Trevor Graham
- Adam Scott as Clyde Goddard
- Paul Corning as Jack
- Andrew Rannells as Manny
- Hayes MacArthur as Dale Beaumont
- Shauna Miles as Theresa
- Ann Dowd as Victoria
- Ella Rae Peck as Stefanie
- Arden Myrin as Melissa

== Reception ==
On Rotten Tomatoes, the film holds an approval rating of 57% based on 102 reviews. The website's critical consensus reads, "It has its moments, but Bachelorette ultimately plays it too safe with its trio of unlikeable leads, betraying them with a predictably sentimental final act that undermines the bracingly honest humor preceding it." On Metacritic, the film has a weighted average score of 53 out of 100, based on 30 critics, indicating "mixed or average" reviews.

Reelviews' James Berardinelli gave the film his lowest rating of zero stars, stating, "Sometimes a movie is so bad it makes me want to go into seclusion and never see another film. Bachelorette is one of those". He would later choose Bachelorette as the worst film of 2012, describing it as "the kind of despicable movie only a troll could appreciate."

Stephen Holden of The New York Times, gave the film a rave review, stating, "Bachelorette is more tartly written, better acted and less forgiving than male-centric equivalents, like The Hangover movies... it comes at you with the crackling intensity of machine-gun fire".

Betsy Sharkey of the Los Angeles Times wrote: "It is billed as a comedy, but it's really a lipstick-smeared drunken tragedy. The humor is so caustic you won't know whether to laugh or cry." Justin Chang of Variety praised the film for "a promisingly funny first half" but concludes that it "all but drowns in its own catty cynicism, turning as stingy with emotion and insight as it is with real laughs."

The film eventually grossed $12 million in theaters worldwide and more than $8 million more on VOD.

=== Home media ===
Bachelorette was released on DVD and Blu-ray on March 19, 2013, by Radius, The Weinstein Company, and Anchor Bay Entertainment.
