= They Remain =

- Directed by: Philip Gelatt
- Written by: Philip Gelatt
- Based on: -30- by Laird Barron
- Produced by: Peter Askin; Will Battersby
- Starring: Rebecca Henderson; William Jackson Harper
- Cinematography: Sean Kirby
- Edited by: Tom Bayne
- Music by: Tom Keohane
- Production companies: Family Ranch; Reno Productions
- Distributed by: Paladin
- Release dates: January 28, 2018 (Panic Film Festival); March 2, 2018 (United States)
- Running time: 102 minutes
- Country: United States
- Language: English

They Remain is a 2018 American thriller film written and directed by Philip Gelatt and starring Rebecca Henderson and William Jackson Harper. It is based on Laird Barron's short story -30-.

== Cast ==
- Rebecca Henderson as Jessica
- William Jackson Harper as Keith
- Malcolm Mills as Pilot
- Jordan Douglas Smith as Rudi "Tex" Roos (voice)
- Charlies Lavoie as Cult Father

== Production ==
Writer/director Philip Gelatt first encountered Laird Barron's writing in "2008 or 2009". After reading the story "-30-" in Barron's collection Occultation and Other Stories, he became interested in adapting it. In terms of casting, Gelatt described the process as follows: "I wanted to find actors who had, in their own personalities, something that felt true to these characters."

== Reception ==
The review aggregator website Rotten Tomatoes reported a 57% approval rating with an average score of 5.7/10, based on 28 reviews. The website's critical consensus reads, "They Remain relies on rich atmosphere to effectively establish a sense of creeping dread that's almost enough to cover for its nagging narrative deficiencies." Metacritic, which uses a weighted average, assigned a score of 49 out of 100 based on nine critics, indicating "mixed or average reviews".

Eric Kohn of IndieWire graded the film a B−. Alex McLevy of The A.V. Club also gave the film a B−. Brian Tallerico of RogerEbert.com awarded the film two stars.
