= Rebecca Henderson =

Canadian actress (born 1980)

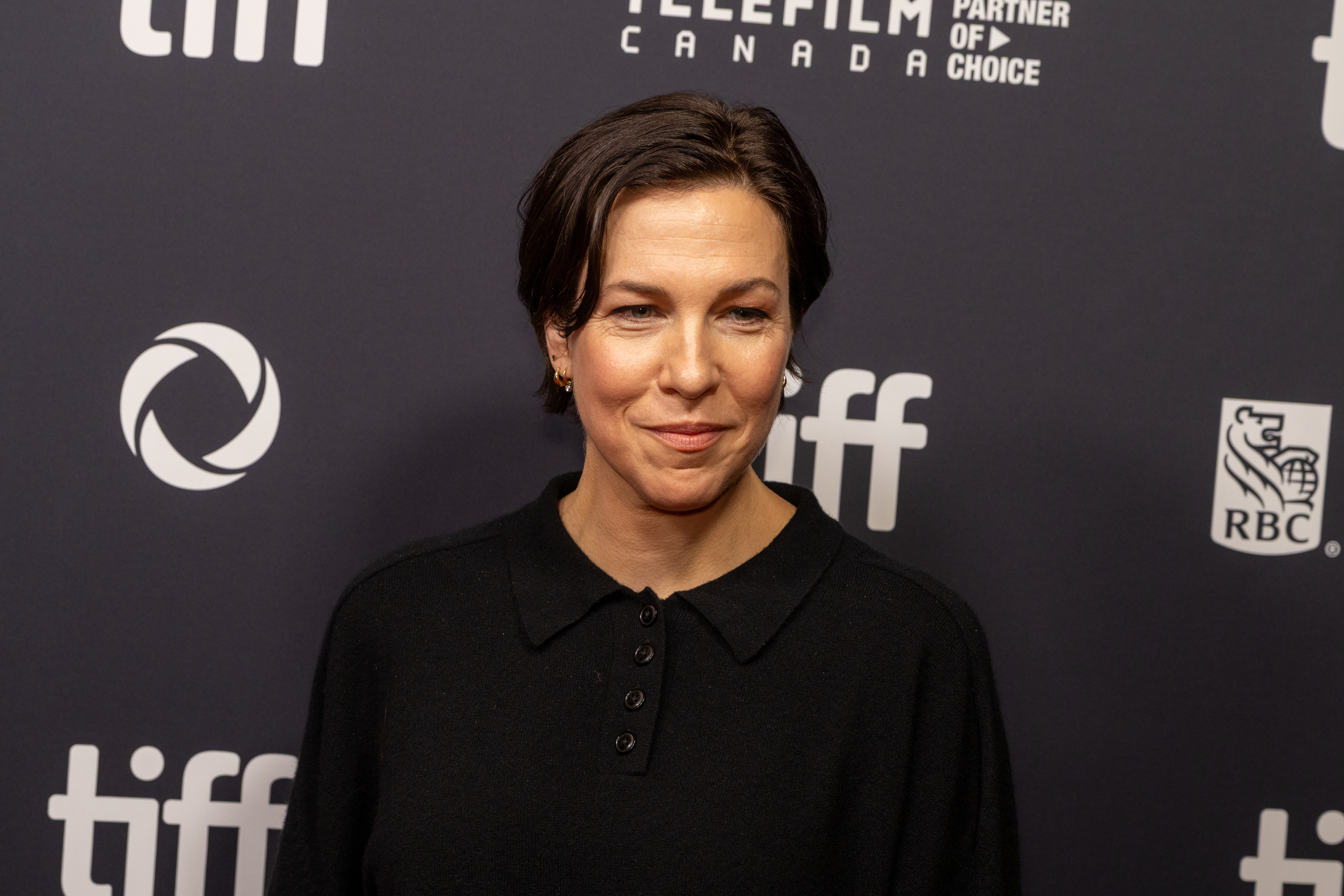
- Born: June 4, 1980 (age 46); Canada
- Occupation: Actress
- Years active: 2008–present
- Known for: Russian Doll; Westworld
- Spouse: Leslye Headland (m. 2016)
- Children: 1

Rebecca Henderson (born June 4, 1980) is a Canadian actress. She is known for her portrayal of Lizzy on the Netflix series Russian Doll and for her roles in independent films Appropriate Behavior, They Remain, and Mickey and the Bear.

== Biography ==
Henderson was born and raised in Canada. She moved to New York for college, and holds an M.F.A. degree from Columbia University.

In October 2019, it was announced that Henderson would star alongside Sigourney Weaver and Kevin Kline in Amblin Partners' feature The Good House. In 2021, she joined the main cast of Freeform's Single Drunk Female as Olivia, a lesbian journalist. She joined cast of the Hulu comedy Sex Appeal in April 2021.

Henderson is a lesbian. In 2016, she married writer-director Leslye Headland. They reside in New York. She is best friends with Katherine Waterston.

== Filmography ==
=== Film ===
Year	Title	Role	Notes
2009	A Lone Star State	Katie	Short
2010	Meskada	Lyla Burrows	
2011	Little Horses	Judy	Short
2011	Genau	Julie	
2012	Compliance	Lawyer	
2013	Diving Normal	Rhonda	
2013	Frank the Bastard	Melody	
2014	Appropriate Behavior	Maxine	
2014	The Mend	David	
2015	True Story	Ellen Parks	
2015	Actresses	Danielle	Short
2015	Mistress America	Anna	
2015	Buzzer	Lora	Short
2015	And It Was Good	Chorus	
2017	Tooth and Nail	Kate	Short
2018	They Remain	Jessica	
2018	A Simple Wedding	Lynne	
2019	Mickey and the Bear	Leslee Watkins	
2019	Lady Liberty	Dr. Herman	Short
2021	Werewolves Within	Dr. Jane Ellis	
2021	The Good House	Tess Good	
2022	Sex Appeal	Ma Kim	
2022	Call Jane	Edie	
2023	You Hurt My Feelings	Alice	
2025	Dust Bunny	Intimidating Woman	

=== Television ===
Year	Title	Role	Notes
2010	The Good Wife	Will's Assistant	Episode: "Mock"
2013	Wallflowers	Michelle	Episode: "Square Pegs"
2015	The Impossibilities	Alex	Recurring Cast
2016	Rectify	Jenny Paar	Episode: "Happy Unburdening"
2017	Cleansed	Candace	Main Cast
2017	I'm Sorry	Leah	Episode: "Too Slow"
2017	Manhunt	Judy Clarke	Recurring Cast
2018	Westworld	Goldberg	Recurring Cast: Season 2
2018	Orange Is the New Black	Alice Denning	Episode: "Chocolate Chip Nookie"
2018	The First	Cathleen Spencer	Episode: "Separation"
2019	Boy Shorts	Sara	Episode: "SNL"
2019–22	Russian Doll	Lizzy	Recurring Cast
2020	Helpsters	Farmer Flynn	Episode: "Nurse Nina & Farmer Flynn/Firefighter Fran & Painter Pat"
2022	Inventing Anna	ADA Catherine McCaw	Recurring Cast
2022	The Accidental Wolf	-	Episode: "Cockfight"
2022–23	Single Drunk Female	Olivia	Main Cast: Season 1, Recurring Cast: Season 2
2024	The Acolyte	Vernestra Rwoh	Main cast; 5 episodes

=== Video games ===
Year	Title	Role	Notes
2008	Grand Theft Auto IV	Karen Daniels / "Michelle"	
2013	Grand Theft Auto V	Karen Daniels / "Michelle"	
2017	Grand Theft Auto Online	Karen Daniels / "Michelle"	

== Awards and honours ==
Henderson received a Drama Desk Award for Outstanding Ensemble performance in Signature Theatre's 2015 revival of "The Wayside Motor Inn" by A.R. Gurney.
