= Michael Esper =

American actor (born 1976)

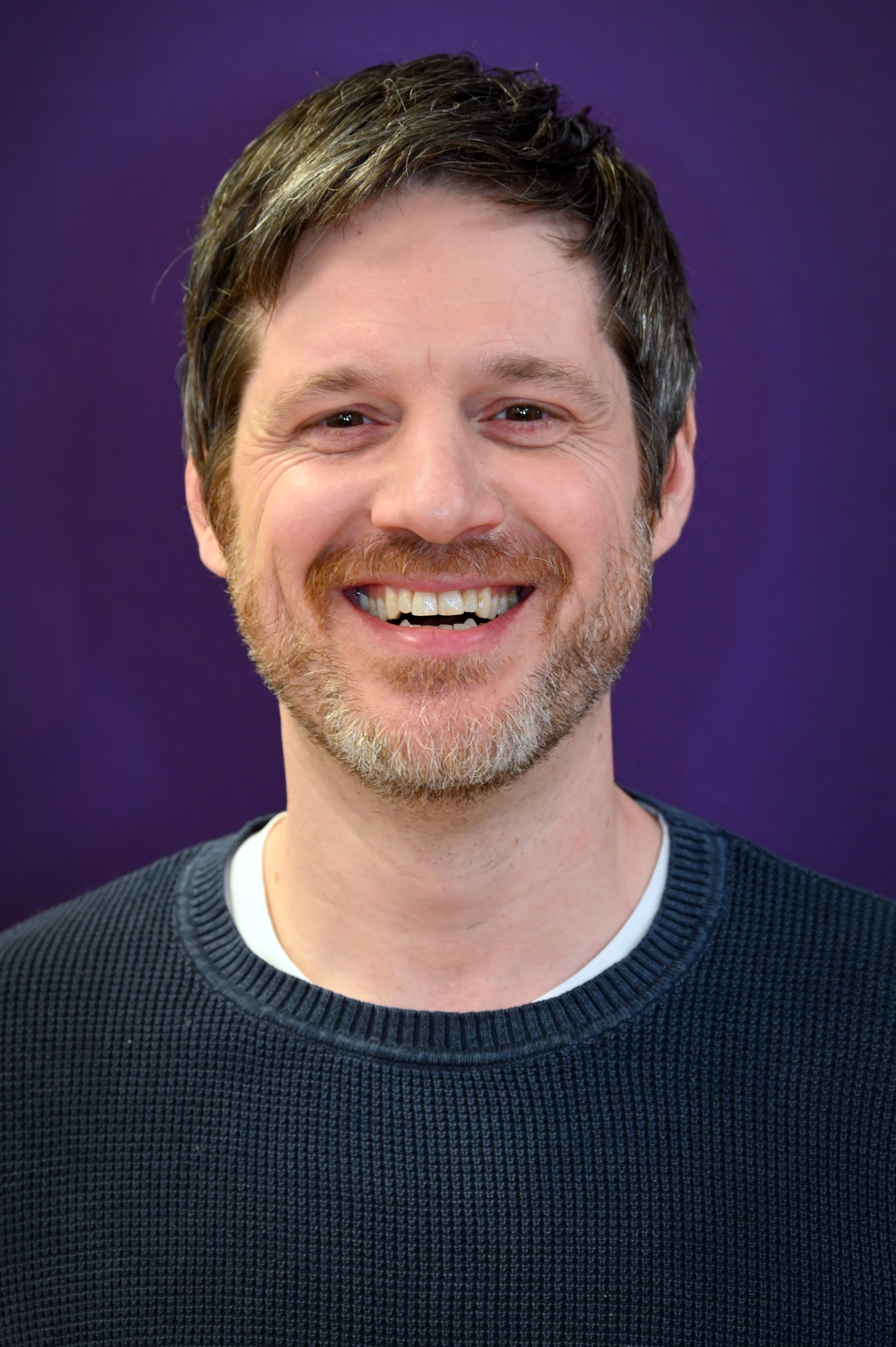
- Esper in 2026
- Born: Michael James Esper; December 1, 1976 (age 49); Manhattan, New York, U.S.
- Education: Oberlin College; Rutgers University, New Brunswick (BFA)
- Occupation: Actor
- Years active: 1995–present

Michael James Esper (born December 1, 1976) is an American actor, best known for his stage work.

== Early life and education ==
Esper was born in Manhattan and raised in Montclair, New Jersey. He is the son of acting teachers William and Suzanne Esper, of the William Esper Studio. He attended Saint Ann's School in Brooklyn Heights. He attended Rutgers University after attending Oberlin College for one year.

== Stage career ==
Esper has appeared on Broadway in Sting's The Last Ship, A Man for All Seasons, Green Day's American Idiot and The Lyons. He also starred in the Off-Broadway premieres of Leslye Headland's Assistance, Nicky Silver's The Lyons, and Tony Kushner's The Intelligent Homosexual's Guide to Capitalism and Socialism with a Key to the Scriptures. His voice is included on American Idiot: The Original Broadway Cast Recording as well as the cast album for Lazarus.

After a break from stage work, he returned to New York theater in February 2014 with David Grimm's play Tales from Red Vienna off-Broadway, opposite Nina Arianda. He followed that by starring in Sting's musical The Last Ship, which began previews on Broadway in September 2014 and ran through January 24, 2015. Esper also appeared in David Bowie and Enda Walsh's musical Lazarus at New York Theatre Workshop. He was nominated for a 2016 Outer Critics Circle Award for his performance in Lazarus. Esper has also appeared in Tennessee Williams' The Glass Menagerie at the Edinburgh International Festival in 2016 and again at the Duke of York's Theatre in London, which ran until April 29, 2017. In 2019, he appeared in Tony Kushner's A Bright Room Called Day; in 2023 he played in Branden Jacobs-Jenkins' Appropriate, and in 2026 was in David Lindsay-Abaire's The Balusters.

Additional stage credits include Crazy Mary, for which he won the Clarence Derwent Award, Big Bill, subUrbia, Manic Flight Reaction, As You Like It, and The Four Of Us.

== Reception ==
The New York Daily News described him as a "rising star" and said, "He acts with an emotional openness and authenticity that's as striking as it is uncommon. Esper's talent is evident whether he's punking out on Broadway in the Green Day musical American Idiot or assuming the cadence and carriage of 16th-century England in A Man for All Seasons."

== Acting credits ==
=== Stage ===
Year	Title	Role	Company/Venue
2004	Big Bill	Pete/Ball Boy/Others	Lincoln Center Theater
2005	As You Like It	Silvius	Delacorte Theater
2005	Manic Flight Reaction	Luke	Playwrights Horizons
2006	subUrbia	Pony	Second Stage Theatre
2006	The Agony and the Agony	Nathan	Vineyard Theatre
2007	Long Day's Journey into Night	Edmund	Druid Theatre (Dublin)
2007	Crazy Mary	Skip	Playwrights Horizons
2008	Me, Myself and I	OTTO	McCarter Theatre
2008	The Four of Us	David	Manhattan Theatre Club
2008	A Man for All Seasons	William Roper	Roundabout Theatre Company (Broadway)
2009–2011	American Idiot	Will	Berkeley Repertory Theatre; St. James Theatre (Broadway)
2011	The Intelligent Homosexual's Guide to Capitalism and Socialism with a Key to the Scriptures	Eli	Public Theater and Guthrie Theater
2011–2012	The Lyons	Curtis Lyons	Vineyard Theatre; Cort Theatre (Broadway)
2012	Assistance	Nick	Playwrights Horizons
2014	Tales from Red Vienna	Bela Hoyos	Manhattan Theatre Club
2014–2015	The Last Ship	Gideon Fletcher	Bank of America Theatre (Chicago); Neil Simon Theatre (Broadway)
2015–2016	Lazarus	Valentine	New York Theatre Workshop
2016	The Glass Menagerie	Tom Wingfield	Edinburgh International Festival
2016–2017	Lazarus	Valentine	King's Cross Theatre (London)
2017	The Glass Menagerie	Tom Wingfield	Duke of York's Theatre (West End)
2018	Seared	Mike	Williamstown Theatre Festival
2018	Catch As Catch Can	Tim/Theresa	New Ohio Theatre
2019	A Bright Room Called Day	Vealtninc Husz	The Public Theater
2022	Slanted! Enchanted! A Pavement Musical	Essem	Sheen Center
2023–2024	Appropriate	Franz Lafayette	Hayes Theater (Broadway); Belasco Theatre (Broadway)
2026	The Balusters	Alan Kirby	Samuel J. Friedman Theatre (Broadway)

=== Film ===
Year	Title	Role	Notes
1995	Dying is Easy	Albert Matson	
2001	A Beautiful Mind	Young John Nash	
2002	American Gun	Burglar	
2005	Loggerheads	Gill	
2005	Bittersweet Place	Joey	
2007	Light and the Sufferer	Paul	
2010	All Good Things	Daniel Marks	
2012	Watching TV with the Red Chinese	Billy	
2012	Frances Ha	Dan	
2012	Crazy Love	Joey	Short film
2013	Runner Runner	Billy Petricoff	
2014	The Drop	Rardy	
2018	For George on His 30th Birthday	George Dougherty	Short film
2018	Ben Is Back	Clayton	
2022	Resurrection	Peter	
2023	Beau Is Afraid	Officer Johnson	
2023	The Creator	Captain Cotton	
2024	Pavements	Essem	Post-production

=== Television ===
Year	Title	Role	Notes
2009	Law & Order	David Sutton	Episode: "Take-Out"
2009	Bunker Hill	Pete Walsh	TV pilot
2013	The Good Wife	Gregory Steck	Episode: "The Wheels of Justice"
2013	Do No Harm	Dr. Kenneth Jordan	13 episodes
2013–2014	Person of Interest	Jason Greenfield	2 episodes
2014	Believe	Jack Callahan	Episode: "Sinking"
2014	Halt and Catch Fire	Ron Cane	Episode: "Close to the Metal"
2014–2015	Nurse Jackie	Gabe	7 episodes
2015	Elementary	Donald Pruitt	Episode: "The Cost of Doing Business"
2016	Shades of Blue	Donnie Pomp	11 episodes
2016	The Family	Doug/Pocked-Marked Man	12 episodes
2016	BrainDead	Noah Feffer	2 episodes
2018	Trust	John Paul Getty Jr.	7 episodes
2019	Prodigal Son	Jon Littman	Episode: "Annihilator"
2019	Reprisal	Colin Quinn	Episode: "The Tale of Harold Horpus"
2019	Ray Donovan	Adam Rain	6 episodes
2020	The Outsider	Kenneth Hayes	4 episodes
2021	Evil	Scientist	Episode: "B Is for Brain"
2023	Florida Man	Deacon	5 episodes
2023	Julia	Noel Winton	Episode: "Bûche De Noël"
2024	Fallout	Bud Askins / Brain-on-a-Roomba	2 episodes
2024	Law & Order	Kenneth Lane	Episode: "Catch and Kill"
