= Virginia Kull =

American actress

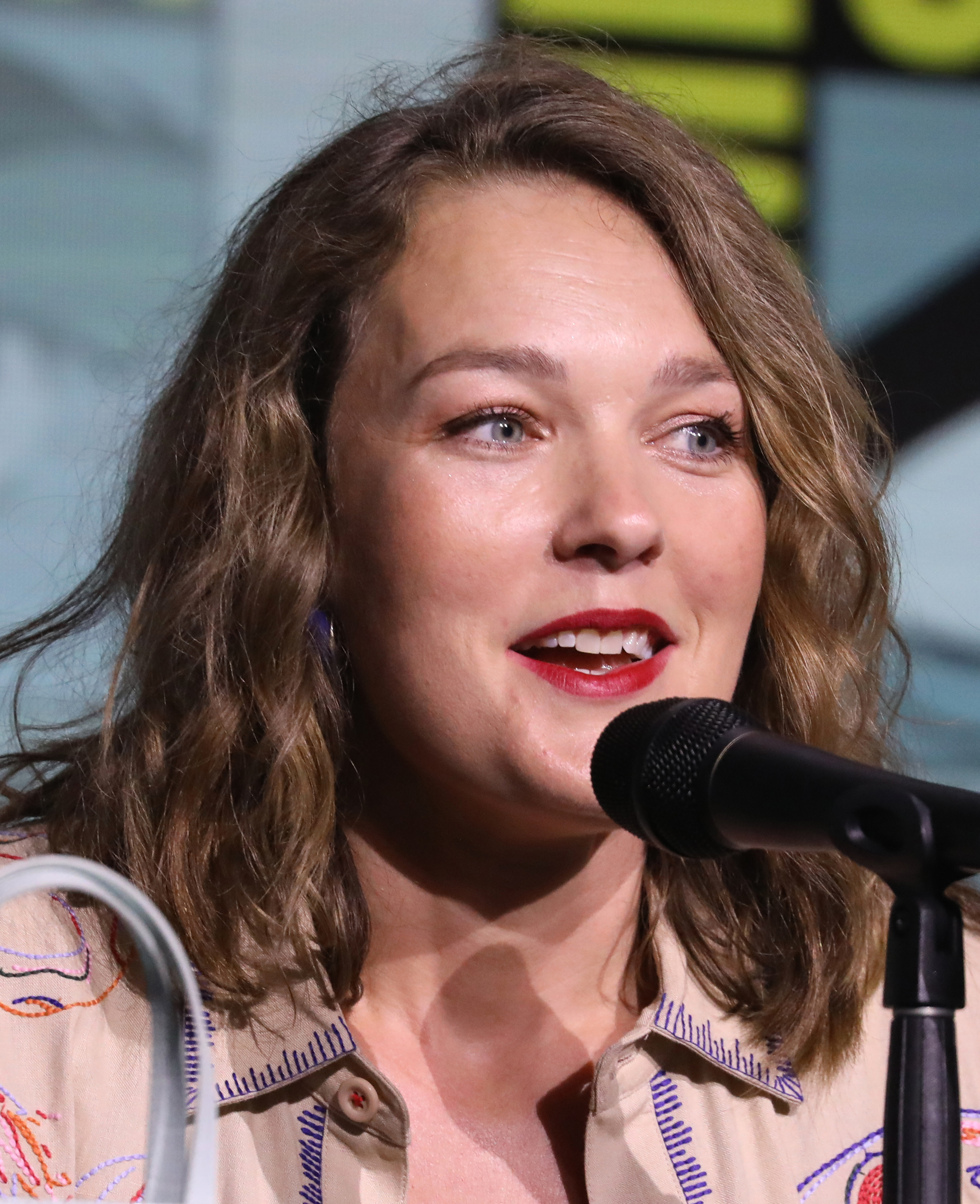
- Kull in 2024
- Occupation: Actress
- Years active: 2004–present
- Spouse: Ryan Howard Young (m. 2009)
- Children: 2

Virginia Kull is an American actress who has appeared in Big Little Lies, NOS4A2, The Looming Tower, and others. In addition to her roles in film and television, she has appeared in various Broadway productions. In 2023, she played the recurring role of Sally Jackson, mother of the title character in the Disney+ adaption of Percy Jackson and the Olympians.

== Career ==
She got her on-stage start in 2005, portraying Judy Battle in the Keen Company's revival of The Bread Winner.

She's made a variety of guest appearances on television shows, such as Law & Order: Special Victims Unit, The Good Wife, Shameless, Boardwalk Empire, Twin Peaks: The Return and This Is Us.

Kull appeared in the 2012 stage adaption of Henry James' novel Washington Square, titled The Heiress. The play was directed by Moisés Kaufman and starred Jessica Chastain, Dan Steven, and David Strathairn.

She starred in the 2014 crime television show Gracepoint as Beth Solano.

In 2017, she made a recurring appearance in HBO's black comedy drama series Big Little Lies. From 2017 to 2018 she appeared in the Amazon drama series Sneaky Pete as Katie Boyd.

In 2018, Kull appeared in a recurring role as Sadie, a nurse in the neurology ward, in the second season of Mr. Mercedes. The same year, she appeared as Kathy Shaughnessy in the drama miniseries The Looming Tower.

From 2019 to 2020, Kull starred as Linda McQueen in the American supernatural horror drama television series NOS4A2.

In 2020, she starred in the German political satire drama Curveball as Leslie.

In 2022, Kull was cast as Sally Jackson, mother of the titular character in the Disney+ fantasy show Percy Jackson and the Olympians series.

She also has a credit in The Rookie where she appears as Diana in the episode "The Mickey".

== Personal life ==
Kull married Ryan Howard Young on May 2, 2009, at St. Paul's Lutheran Church in Brooklyn, New York.

They have twin children, Wilhelmina and Lloyd.

== Acting credits ==
=== Film ===
Year	Title	Role	Notes
2018	Nancy	Deb Loden	
2018	Imperfections	Cassidy	
2020	The Empty Man	Ruthie	
2020	Curveball	Leslie	
2021	The Big Bend	Melanie Price	

=== Television ===
Year	Title	Role	Notes
2009	A NY Thing	Film Girl 2	Television film
2010	Boardwalk Empire	Nan Britton	4 episodes
2011	Nurse Jackie	Mia	Episode: "When the Saints Go"
2011; 2022	Law & Order: Special Victims Unit	Catherine Harrison / Claire Lee	Episode: "Reparations," "Do You Believe in Miracles?"
2012	Person of Interest	Ashley	Episode: "Matsya Nyaya"
2012	The Good Wife	Elizabeth Sun	Episode: "Two Girls, One Code"
2013	The Following	Maggie Kester	2 episodes
2014	Gracepoint	Beth Solano	10 episodes
2015	The Affair	Dr. D'Amato	Episode #2.9
2016	Stitchers	Christine	Episode: "Pretty Little Lawyers"
2017	This Is Us	Samantha	Episode: "The Big Day"
2017	Big Little Lies	Emily Barnes	6 episodes
2017	Twin Peaks: The Return	Szymon Waitress	Episode: "Part 13"
2017	Get Shorty	Brynlee	Episode: "Sins of a Chambermaid"
2017–2018	Sneaky Pete	Katie Boyd	8 episodes
2018	The Looming Tower	Kathy Shaughnessy	10 episodes
2018	Mr. Mercedes	Sadie	4 episodes
2019–2020	NOS4A2	Linda McQueen	20 episodes
2021	Shameless	Nancy Lamper	Episode: "Father Frank, Full of Grace"
2022	Super Pumped	Jill Hazelbaker	4 episodes
2023–present	Percy Jackson and the Olympians	Sally Jackson	Recurring role
2025	The Rookie	Diana Glasser/Calver	3 episodes

=== Theatre ===
Year	Title	Role	Director	Venue	Notes	Ref
2005	Breadwinner	Judy Battle	Carl Forsman	Merrimack Repertory Theatre		
2006	Theophilus North	Eloise Fenwick	Carl Forsman	Harold Clurman Theatre		
2007	Old Acquaintance	Deirdre Drake / Karina / Susan	Michael Wilson	American Airlines Theatre	Understudy	
2008	The Tempest	Miranda	Marc Masterson	Arena Stage		
2008	Death of a Salesman	Miss Forsythe	Timothy Bond	Arena Stage		
2008	Dividing the Estate	Irene Ratliff	Michael Wilson	Booth Theatre	Original cast	
2009	To Kill a Mockingbird	Mayella Ewell	Michael Wilson	Hartford Stage		
2010	Orphans' Home Cycle	Bessie Stillman / Minnie Robedaux Curits	Michael Wilson	Peter Norton Space		
2011	Sex Lives of Our Parents	Virginia	David McCallum	McGinn Cazale Theatre		
2011	Man and Boy	Carol Penn	Maria Aitken	American Airlines Theatre	Original cast	
2012	Assistance	Nora	Trip Cullman	Playwrights Horizons		
2012	The Heiress	Maria	Moisés Kaufman	Jujamcyn Theatre	Original cast	
2013	Rapture, Blister, Burn	Avery	Peter Dubois	Playwrights Horizons		
2024	Cult of Love	Evie Dahl	Trip Cullman	Berkeley Repertory Theatre		
