= List of The Good Place episodes =

Series title card

The Good Place is an American fantasy-comedy television series created by Michael Schur for NBC. The series focuses on Eleanor Shellstrop (Kristen Bell), a recently deceased young woman who wakes up in the afterlife and is sent by Michael (Ted Danson) to "the Good Place", a heaven-like utopia he designed, in reward for her righteous life. However, she quickly realizes that she was sent there by mistake, and she must hide her imperfect behavior, and try to be a better person. William Jackson Harper, Jameela Jamil, and Manny Jacinto co-star as other residents of the Good Place, together with D'Arcy Carden as an artificial being helping the residents. Each episode is listed as "Chapter (xx)" following the opening title sequence.

The series was first announced on August 13, 2015, as a 13-episode untitled comedy based on a pitch by Schur. The first season began airing on September 19, 2016, and concluded on January 19, 2017. On January 30, 2017, NBC renewed the series for a second season of 13 episodes, which premiered on September 20, 2017, with an hour-long premiere. The second season concluded on February 1, 2018. On November 21, 2017, NBC renewed the series for a 13-episode third season, which premiered on September 27, 2018, and concluded on January 24, 2019. On December 4, 2018, the series was renewed for a fourth and final season comprising 14 episodes, which premiered on September 26, 2019. The final episode of the series aired on January 30, 2020. During the course of the series, 53 episodes of The Good Place aired over four seasons.

During its run, the series was critically acclaimed (Note: Season-by-season reception: Season 1 holds a 92% approval rating based on 74 reviews on Rotten Tomatoes and a score of 78 based on 32 reviews on Metacritic.; Season 2 holds a 100% approval rating based on 59 reviews on Rotten Tomatoes and a score of 87 based on 10 reviews on Metacritic.; Season 3 holds a 98% approval rating based on 47 reviews on Rotten Tomatoes and a score of 96 based on 5 reviews on Metacritic.; Season 4 holds a 100% approval rating based on 53 reviews on Rotten Tomatoes.) and earned many awards and nominations. The show was nominated for fourteen Primetime Emmy Awards, including two for Outstanding Comedy Series. In several international territories, the show is distributed on Netflix. The first season was released on September 21, 2017, while episodes of subsequent seasons became available within 24 hours of their U.S. broadcast. DVD releases for the series were distributed by the Shout! Factory. The first season was released on DVD in region 1 on October 17, 2017, while the second and third were released on DVD on July 17, 2018, and July 30, 2019, respectively. The complete series was released on Blu-ray on May 19, 2020. On September 13, 2019, a six-episode web series, titled The Selection, was released on NBC's website, app, and YouTube channel.

== Series overview ==
| Season | Episodes | Originally released | | Rank | Average viewers (in millions inc. DVR) |
| Season | Episodes | First released | Last released | Rank | Average viewers (in millions inc. DVR) |
|---|---|---|---|---|---|
| 1 | 13 | September 19, 2016 | January 19, 2017 | 77 | 5.72 |
| 2 | 13 | September 20, 2017 | February 1, 2018 | 77 | 5.78 |
| 3 | 13 | September 27, 2018 | January 24, 2019 | 99 | 4.57 |
| 4 | 14 | September 26, 2019 | January 30, 2020 | 92 | 3.56 |

== Episodes ==
=== Season 1 (2016–17) ===
Season 1 episodes
| No. overall | No. in season | Title | Directed by | Written by | Original release date | Prod. code | U.S. viewers (millions) |
|---|---|---|---|---|---|---|---|
| 1 | 1 | "Everything Is Fine" | Drew Goddard | Michael Schur | September 19, 2016 | 101 | 8.04 |
| 2 | 2 | "Flying" | Michael McDonald | Alan Yang | September 19, 2016 | 102 | 8.04 |
| 3 | 3 | "Tahani Al-Jamil" | Beth McCarthy-Miller | Aisha Muharrar | September 22, 2016 | 103 | 5.25 |
| 4 | 4 | "Jason Mendoza" | Payman Benz | Joe Mande | September 29, 2016 | 104 | 4.45 |
| 5 | 5 | "Category 55 Emergency Doomsday Crisis" | Morgan Sackett | Matt Murray | October 6, 2016 | 109 | 4.97 |
| 6 | 6 | "What We Owe to Each Other" | Tucker Gates | Dylan Morgan & Josh Siegal | October 13, 2016 | 105 | 4.23 |
| 7 | 7 | "The Eternal Shriek" | Trent O'Donnell | Megan Amram | October 20, 2016 | 106 | 3.79 |
| 8 | 8 | "Most Improved Player" | Tristram Shapeero | Dan Schofield | October 27, 2016 | 107 | 3.89 |
| 9 | 9 | "...Someone Like Me as a Member" | Dean Holland | Jen Statsky | November 3, 2016 | 108 | 3.68 |
| 10 | 10 | "Chidi's Choice" | Linda Mendoza | Demi Adejuyigbe | January 5, 2017 | 110 | 3.53 |
| 11 | 11 | "What's My Motivation" | Lynn Shelton | Andrew Law | January 12, 2017 | 111 | 3.64 |
| 12 | 12 | "Mindy St. Claire" | Dean Holland | Megan Amram & Jen Statsky | January 19, 2017 | 112 | 3.93 |
| 13 | 13 | "Michael's Gambit" | Michael Schur | Michael Schur | January 19, 2017 | 113 | 3.93 |

=== Season 2 (2017–18) ===
Season 2 episodes
| No. overall | No. in season | Title | Directed by | Written by | Original release date | Prod. code | U.S. viewers (millions) |
|---|---|---|---|---|---|---|---|
| 14 (Note: The second-season premiere aired as one hour-long episode, but the on-screen title identified it as "Chapters 14 & 15" of the series.) | 1 | "Everything Is Great!" (Part 1) | Trent O'Donnell | Jen Statsky | September 20, 2017 | 201 | 5.28 |
| 15 | 2 | "Everything Is Great!" (Part 2) | Trent O'Donnell | Joe Mande | September 20, 2017 | 202 | 5.28 |
| 16 | 3 | "Dance Dance Resolution" | Drew Goddard | Megan Amram | September 28, 2017 | 203 | 4.67 |
| 17 | 4 | "Team Cockroach" | Morgan Sackett | Dan Schofield | October 5, 2017 | 204 | 4.17 |
| 18 | 5 | "Existential Crisis" | Beth McCarthy-Miller | Andrew Law | October 12, 2017 | 206 | 4.05 |
| 19 | 6 | "The Trolley Problem" | Dean Holland | Josh Siegal & Dylan Morgan | October 19, 2017 | 205 | 3.92 |
| 20 | 7 | "Janet and Michael" | Dean Holland | Kate Gersten | October 26, 2017 | 207 | 3.97 |
| 21 | 8 | "Derek" | Jude Weng | Cord Jefferson | November 2, 2017 | 208 | 3.06 |
| 22 | 9 | "Leap to Faith" | Linda Mendoza | Christopher Encell | January 4, 2018 | 209 | 3.08 |
| 23 | 10 | "Best Self" | Julie Anne Robinson | Tyler Straessle | January 11, 2018 | 210 | 3.11 |
| 24 | 11 | "Rhonda, Diana, Jake, and Trent" | Alan Yang | Jen Statsky & Dan Schofield | January 18, 2018 | 211 | 3.00 |
| 25 | 12 | "The Burrito" | Dean Holland | Megan Amram & Joe Mande | January 25, 2018 | 212 | 3.65 |
| 26 | 13 | "Somewhere Else" | Michael Schur | Michael Schur | February 1, 2018 | 213 | 3.19 |

=== Season 3 (2018–19) ===
Season 3 episodes
| No. overall | No. in season | Title | Directed by | Written by | Original release date | U.S. viewers (millions) |
|---|---|---|---|---|---|---|
| 27 (Note: The third-season premiere aired in an hour-long episode, but NBC ordered 13 episodes.) | 1 | "Everything Is Bonzer!" (Part 1) | Dean Holland | Jen Statsky & Michael Schur | September 27, 2018 | 3.13 |
| 28 | 2 | "Everything Is Bonzer!" (Part 2) | Dean Holland | Jen Statsky | September 27, 2018 | 3.13 |
| 29 | 3 | "The Brainy Bunch" | Jude Weng | Dan Schofield | October 4, 2018 | 2.96 |
| 30 | 4 | "The Snowplow" | Beth McCarthy-Miller | Joe Mande | October 11, 2018 | 2.71 |
| 31 | 5 | "Jeremy Bearimy" | Trent O'Donnell | Megan Amram | October 18, 2018 | 2.70 |
| 32 | 6 | "The Ballad of Donkey Doug" | Rebecca Asher | Matt Murray | October 25, 2018 | 2.67 |
| 33 | 7 | "A Fractured Inheritance" | Beth McCarthy-Miller | Kassia Miller | November 1, 2018 | 2.72 |
| 34 | 8 | "The Worst Possible Use of Free Will" | Claire Scanlon | Cord Jefferson | November 8, 2018 | 2.77 |
| 35 | 9 | "Don't Let the Good Life Pass You By" | Dean Holland | Andrew Law | November 15, 2018 | 2.69 |
| 36 | 10 | "Janet(s)" | Morgan Sackett | Josh Siegal & Dylan Morgan | December 6, 2018 | 2.58 |
| 37 | 11 | "The Book of Dougs" | Ken Whittingham | Kate Gersten | January 10, 2019 | 2.72 |
| 38 | 12 | "Chidi Sees the Time-Knife" | Jude Weng | Christopher Encell & Joe Mande | January 17, 2019 | 2.52 |
| 39 | 13 | "Pandemonium" | Michael Schur | Megan Amram & Jen Statsky | January 24, 2019 | 2.39 |

=== Season 4 (2019–20) ===
Season 4 episodes
| No. overall | No. in season | Title | Directed by | Written by | Original release date | Prod. code | U.S. viewers (millions) |
|---|---|---|---|---|---|---|---|
| 40 | 1 | "A Girl from Arizona" (Part 1) | Drew Goddard | Andrew Law & Kassia Miller | September 26, 2019 | 401 | 2.42 |
| 41 | 2 | "A Girl from Arizona" (Part 2) | Drew Goddard | Andrew Law & Kassia Miller | October 3, 2019 | 402 | 2.11 |
| 42 | 3 | "Chillaxing" | Anya Adams | Aisha Muharrar | October 10, 2019 | 403 | 1.92 |
| 43 | 4 | "Tinker, Tailor, Demon, Spy" | Morgan Sackett | Cord Jefferson | October 17, 2019 | 404 | 2.02 |
| 44 | 5 | "Employee of the Bearimy" | Beth McCarthy-Miller | Joe Mande | October 24, 2019 | 405 | 1.91 |
| 45 | 6 | "A Chip Driver Mystery" | Steve Day | Lizzy Pace | October 31, 2019 | 406 | 2.21 |
| 46 | 7 | "Help Is Other People" | Beth McCarthy-Miller | Dave King | November 7, 2019 | 407 | 1.98 |
| 47 | 8 | "The Funeral to End All Funerals" | Kristen Bell | Josh Siegal & Dylan Morgan | November 14, 2019 | 408 | 2.06 |
| 48 | 9 | "The Answer" | Valeria Migliassi Collins | Dan Schofield | November 21, 2019 | 410 | 2.05 |
| 49 | 10 | "You've Changed, Man" | Rebecca Asher | Matt Murray | January 9, 2020 | 409 | 2.08 |
| 50 | 11 | "Mondays, Am I Right?" | Rebecca Asher | Jen Statsky | January 16, 2020 | 411 | 1.93 |
| 51 | 12 | "Patty" | Morgan Sackett | Megan Amram | January 23, 2020 | 412 | 2.12 |
| 52 | 13 | "Whenever You're Ready" | Michael Schur | Michael Schur | January 30, 2020 | 413 | 2.32 |
| 53 | 14 | "Whenever You're Ready" | Michael Schur | Michael Schur | January 30, 2020 | 414 | 2.32 |

== Webisodes ==
=== The Selection (2019) ===
On September 13, 2019, NBC released a six-part digital series consisting of two-minute episodes. Serving as a story bridge between the third and fourth seasons, the series is set in the Bad Place, as Shawn and his demon cohorts decide which humans to send to Michael's newly formed afterlife neighborhood to thwart his benevolent plan.

| No. | Title | Directed by (Note: Information taken from credits of each episode) | Original release date |
|---|---|---|---|
| 1 | "Part 1: The Mission" | Eric Kissack | September 13, 2019 |
Shawn and the other demons discuss how to go about choosing the humans for Michael's experiment.
| 2 | "Part 2: The Candidates" | Eric Kissack | September 13, 2019 |
Shawn and the demons try to come up with four humans that can take part in Michael's experiment.
| 3 | "Part 3: The Takeout Order" | Eric Kissack | September 13, 2019 |
Shawn and the demons argue about what to eat for lunch.
| 4 | "Part 4: The Storm Out" | Eric Kissack | September 13, 2019 |
Shawn gets mad and walks out on the other demons.
| 5 | "Part 5: The Talk" | Eric Kissack | September 13, 2019 |
The demons try to convince Shawn to come back after getting mad, and he realizes he is key to the process.
| 6 | "Part 6: The Solution" | Eric Kissack | September 13, 2019 |
Shawn and the demons find the answer.

== Ratings ==
The Good Place : U.S. viewers per episode (millions)

| Season | Episode number | | | | | | | | | | | | | | Average |
| Season | 1 | 2 | 3 | 4 | 5 | 6 | 7 | 8 | 9 | 10 | 11 | 12 | 13 | 14 | Average |
|---|---|---|---|---|---|---|---|---|---|---|---|---|---|---|---|
| 1 | 8.04 | 8.04 | 5.25 | 4.45 | 4.97 | 4.23 | 3.79 | 3.89 | 3.68 | 3.53 | 3.64 | 3.93 | 3.93 | – | 4.72 |
| 2 | 5.28 | 5.28 | 4.67 | 4.17 | 4.05 | 3.92 | 3.97 | 3.06 | 3.08 | 3.11 | 3.00 | 3.65 | 3.19 | – | 3.88 |
| 3 | 3.13 | 3.13 | 2.96 | 2.71 | 2.70 | 2.67 | 2.72 | 2.77 | 2.69 | 2.58 | 2.72 | 2.52 | 2.39 | – | 2.74 |
| 4 | 2.42 | 2.11 | 1.92 | 2.02 | 1.91 | 2.21 | 1.98 | 2.06 | 2.05 | 2.08 | 1.93 | 2.12 | 2.32 | 2.32 | 2.09 |

Audience measurement performed by Nielsen Media Research
