= List of awards and nominations received by The Good Place =

Awards and nominations received by The Good Place
- Title card for the series
Awards and nominations
Award	Wins	Nominations
AARP Movies for Grownups Awards	0	1
American Cinema Editors Awards	0	3
American Film Institute Awards	1	1
Art Directors Guild Awards	0	2
Black Reel Awards	1	2
Critics' Choice Television Awards	2	9
Dorian Awards	0	3
Golden Globe Awards	0	2
Golden Reel Awards	0	3
Hollywood Critics Association Awards	1	1
Hugo Awards	4	6
NAACP Image Awards	1	1
Nebula Awards	1	3
Peabody Awards	1	1
People's Choice Awards	1	9
Primetime Emmy Awards	0	14
Producers Guild of America Awards	0	1
Satellite Awards	0	4
Saturn Awards	0	3
Teen Choice Awards	0	3
Television Critics Association Awards	1	8
Writers Guild of America Awards	0	1

Totals (Note: Certain award groups do not simply award one winner. They acknowledge several different recipients, have runners-up, and have third place. Since this is a specific recognition and is different from losing an award, runner-up mentions are considered wins in this award tally. For simplification and to avoid errors, each award in this list has been presumed to have had a prior nomination.)
- Wins: 14
- Nominations: 81

The Good Place is an American fantasy comedy television series created by Michael Schur. The series aired for four seasons consisting of a total of fifty-three episodes on NBC from September 19, 2016, to January 30, 2020. It focuses on Eleanor Shellstrop (Kristen Bell), who arrives in the afterlife and is welcomed by Michael (Ted Danson) to "the Good Place", a highly selective Heaven-like utopia he designed. However, she realizes that she was sent there by mistake and must hide her morally imperfect behavior while trying to become a better and more ethical person. William Jackson Harper, Jameela Jamil, and Manny Jacinto co-star as fellow Good Place residents Chidi Anagonye, Tahani Al-Jamil, and Jason Mendoza, respectively, while D'Arcy Carden co-stars as Janet, an artificial being who assists the residents.

During its run, The Good Place received critical acclaim (Note: Season-by-season reception: Season 1 holds a 92% approval rating based on 73 reviews on Rotten Tomatoes and a score of 78 based on 32 reviews on Metacritic.; Season 2 holds a 100% approval rating based on 58 reviews on Rotten Tomatoes and a score of 87 based on 10 reviews on Metacritic.; Season 3 holds a 98% approval rating based on 47 reviews on Rotten Tomatoes and a score of 96 based on 5 reviews on Metacritic.; Season 4 holds a 100% approval rating based on 51 reviews on Rotten Tomatoes.) and earned many awards and nominations. The series was nominated for fourteen Primetime Emmy Awards, including two nominations for Outstanding Comedy Series and three nominations for Danson for Outstanding Lead Actor in a Comedy Series. It was also nominated for two Golden Globe Awards, including a nomination for Best Television Series – Musical or Comedy and a nomination for Bell for Best Actress – Television Series Musical or Comedy. In addition, the show was nominated for six Hugo Awards, winning four times for "The Trolley Problem", "Janet(s)", "The Answer", and "Whenever You're Ready". It was nominated for three Nebula Awards, winning one for "Whenever You're Ready", and for three Saturn Awards. In 2017, The Good Place was named by the American Film Institute as one of its top 10 television programs of the year, and in 2019, the show was honored with a Peabody Award for its contributions to entertainment.

== Awards and nominations ==
Award	Year (Note: The listed year refers to the date of the ceremony.)	Category	Nominee(s)	Result	Ref.
AARP Movies for Grownups Awards	2021	Best Actor (TV/Streaming)	Ted Danson	Nominated	
American Cinema Editors Awards	2019	Best Edited Comedy Series for Commercial Television	Eric Kissack (for "Don't Let the Good Life Pass You By")	Nominated	
American Cinema Editors Awards	2020	Best Edited Comedy Series for Commercial Television	Eric Kissack (for "Pandemonium")	Nominated	
American Cinema Editors Awards	2021	Best Edited Comedy Series for Commercial Television	Eric Kissack (for "Whenever You're Ready")	Nominated	
American Film Institute Awards	2017	Television Programs of the Year	The Good Place	Won (Note: All nominees in the category are recognized.)	
Art Directors Guild Awards	2019	Half Hour Single-Camera Television Series	"Janet(s)" (Note: Ian Phillips (production designer); Adam Rowe (art director); Kim Wannop (set decorator); Graham Ratliff and Evan Regester (graphic artists); Camille Bratkowski (set designer))	Nominated	
Art Directors Guild Awards	2020	Half Hour Single-Camera Television Series	"Employee of the Bearimy" and "Help Is Other People" (Note: Ian Phillips (production designer); Adam Rowe (art director); Camille Bratkowski (set designer); Graham Ratliff (graphic designer); Kim Wannop (set decorator))	Nominated	
Black Reel Awards	2019	Outstanding Guest Actress in a Comedy Series	Maya Rudolph	Nominated	
Black Reel Awards	2020	Outstanding Guest Actress in a Comedy Series	Maya Rudolph	Won	
Critics' Choice Television Awards	2016	Most Exciting New Series	The Good Place	Won	
Critics' Choice Television Awards	2018	Best Actor in a Comedy Series	Ted Danson	Won	
Critics' Choice Television Awards	2018	Best Actress in a Comedy Series	Kristen Bell	Nominated	
Critics' Choice Television Awards	2019	Best Actor in a Comedy Series	Ted Danson	Nominated	
Critics' Choice Television Awards	2019	Best Comedy Series	The Good Place	Nominated	
Critics' Choice Television Awards	2019	Best Supporting Actor in a Comedy Series	William Jackson Harper	Nominated	
Critics' Choice Television Awards	2020	Best Actor in a Comedy Series	Ted Danson	Nominated	
Critics' Choice Television Awards	2020	Best Supporting Actor in a Comedy Series	William Jackson Harper	Nominated	
Critics' Choice Television Awards	2020	Best Supporting Actress in a Comedy Series	D'Arcy Carden	Nominated	
Dorian Awards	2018	TV Comedy of the Year	The Good Place	Nominated	
Dorian Awards	2019	TV Comedy of the Year	The Good Place	Nominated	
Dorian Awards	2020	Best TV Comedy	The Good Place	Nominated	
Golden Globe Awards	2019	Best Actress – Television Series Musical or Comedy	Kristen Bell	Nominated	
Golden Globe Awards	2019	Best Television Series – Musical or Comedy	The Good Place	Nominated	
Golden Reel Awards	2018	Outstanding Achievement in Sound Editing — Live Action Under 30:00	"Janet and Michael" (Note: Brent Findley (supervising sound editor); Kevin McCullough (sound effects editor); Greg Brown (dialogue editor); Jason Tregoe Newman (music editor); Dominique Decaudain-Tabach and Pamela Kahn (Foley artists))	Nominated	
Golden Reel Awards	2019	Outstanding Achievement in Sound Editing — Live Action Under 35:00	"Janet(s)" (Note: Individual nominees for this year's award are not available.)	Nominated	
Golden Reel Awards	2020	Outstanding Achievement in Sound Editing — Live Action Under 35:00	"The Answer" (Note: Brent Findley (supervising sound editor); Kevin McCullough (sound effects editor); Michael Jesmer (dialogue editor); Jason Tregoe Newman, Bryant J. Furhmann, and Jason Ryterband (music editors); Jody Holwadel Thomas and Elizabeth Rainey (Foley artists); Terry Boyd Jr. (Foley editor))	Nominated	
Hollywood Critics Association Midseason Awards	2020	Best Broadcast Network Series (New or Recurring)	The Good Place	Won	
Hugo Awards	2018	Best Dramatic Presentation, Short Form	"Michael's Gambit" (written and directed by Michael Schur)	Nominated	
Hugo Awards	2018	Best Dramatic Presentation, Short Form	"The Trolley Problem" (written by Josh Siegal and Dylan Morgan; directed by Dean Holland)	Won	
Hugo Awards	2019	Best Dramatic Presentation, Short Form	"Janet(s)" (written by Josh Siegal and Dylan Morgan; directed by Morgan Sackett)	Won	
Hugo Awards	2019	Best Dramatic Presentation, Short Form	"Jeremy Bearimy" (written by Megan Amram; directed by Trent O'Donnell)	Nominated	
Hugo Awards	2020	Best Dramatic Presentation, Short Form	"The Answer" (written by Daniel Schofield; directed by Valeria Migliassi Collins)	Won	
Hugo Awards	2021	Best Dramatic Presentation, Short Form	"Whenever You're Ready" (written and directed by Michael Schur)	Won	
NAACP Image Awards	2020	Outstanding Writing in a Comedy Series	Cord Jefferson (for "Tinker, Tailor, Demon, Spy")	Won	
Nebula Awards	2018	Ray Bradbury Award for Outstanding Dramatic Presentation	"Michael's Gambit" (written and directed by Michael Schur)	Nominated	
Nebula Awards	2019	Ray Bradbury Award for Outstanding Dramatic Presentation	"Jeremy Bearimy" (written by Megan Amram)	Nominated	
Nebula Awards	2021	Ray Bradbury Award for Outstanding Dramatic Presentation	"Whenever You're Ready" (written by Michael Schur)	Won	
Peabody Awards	2019	Entertainment honoree	The Good Place (Note: Presented to Universal Television, Fremulon, and 3 Arts Entertainment)	Won	
People's Choice Awards	2017	Favorite New TV Comedy	The Good Place	Nominated	
People's Choice Awards	2018	Comedy Show of the Year	The Good Place	Nominated	
People's Choice Awards	2018	Comedy TV Star of the Year	Kristen Bell	Nominated	
People's Choice Awards	2019	Comedy Show of the Year	The Good Place	Nominated	
People's Choice Awards	2019	Comedy TV Star of the Year	Kristen Bell	Won	
People's Choice Awards	2019	Comedy TV Star of the Year	Jameela Jamil	Nominated	
People's Choice Awards	2020	Comedy Show of the Year	The Good Place	Nominated	
People's Choice Awards	2020	Comedy TV Star of the Year	Kristen Bell	Nominated	
People's Choice Awards	2020	Comedy TV Star of the Year	Jameela Jamil	Nominated	
Primetime Emmy Awards	2018	Outstanding Guest Actress in a Comedy Series (Note: Award presented at the Primetime Creative Arts Emmy Awards)	Maya Rudolph (for "The Burrito")	Nominated	
Primetime Emmy Awards	2018	Outstanding Lead Actor in a Comedy Series	Ted Danson	Nominated	
Primetime Emmy Awards	2019	Outstanding Comedy Series	The Good Place (Note: Michael Schur, David Miner, Morgan Sackett, Drew Goddard, and Dylan Morgan (executive producers); Josh Siegal, Joe Mande, and Megan Amram (co-executive producers); Jen Statsky (supervising producer); David Hyman (produced by); Matt Murray (consulting producer))	Nominated	
Primetime Emmy Awards	2019	Outstanding Creative Achievement in Interactive Media within a Scripted Program	The Good Place Interactive Fan Experience	Nominated	
Primetime Emmy Awards	2019	Outstanding Guest Actress in a Comedy Series	Maya Rudolph (for "Chidi Sees the Time-Knife")	Nominated	
Primetime Emmy Awards	2019	Outstanding Lead Actor in a Comedy Series	Ted Danson	Nominated	
Primetime Emmy Awards	2019	Outstanding Writing for a Comedy Series	Josh Siegal and Dylan Morgan (for "Janet(s)")	Nominated	
Primetime Emmy Awards	2020	Outstanding Comedy Series	The Good Place (Note: Michael Schur, David Miner, Morgan Sackett, and Drew Goddard (executive producers); Dylan Morgan, Josh Siegal, Joe Mande, Megan Amram, Jen Statsky, and Dave King (co-executive producers); David Hyman (produced by); Matt Murray (consulting producer))	Nominated	
Primetime Emmy Awards	2020	Outstanding Guest Actress in a Comedy Series	Maya Rudolph (for "You've Changed, Man")	Nominated	
Primetime Emmy Awards	2020	Outstanding Lead Actor in a Comedy Series	Ted Danson	Nominated	
Primetime Emmy Awards	2020	Outstanding Short Form Comedy or Drama Series	The Good Place Presents: The Selection (Note: Michael Schur, Morgan Sackett, and David Hyman (executive producers); Eric Kissack, Matt Quezada, and Doug Smith (producers))	Nominated	
Primetime Emmy Awards	2020	Outstanding Supporting Actor in a Comedy Series	William Jackson Harper	Nominated	
Primetime Emmy Awards	2020	Outstanding Supporting Actress in a Comedy Series	D'Arcy Carden	Nominated	
Primetime Emmy Awards	2020	Outstanding Writing for a Comedy Series	Michael Schur (for "Whenever You're Ready")	Nominated	
Producers Guild of America Awards	2019	Best Episodic Comedy	The Good Place (Note: Michael Schur, David Miner, Morgan Sackett, Drew Goddard, Josh Siegal, Dylan Morgan, Joe Mande, Megan Amram, David Hyman, and Jen Statsky)	Nominated	
Satellite Awards	2019	Best Actor in a Series, Comedy or Musical	Ted Danson	Nominated	
Satellite Awards	2019	Best Television Series, Comedy or Musical	The Good Place	Nominated	
Satellite Awards	2020	Best Actor in a Series, Comedy or Musical	Ted Danson	Nominated	
Satellite Awards	2020	Best Television Series, Comedy or Musical	The Good Place	Nominated	
Saturn Awards	2017	Best Fantasy Television Series	The Good Place	Nominated	
Saturn Awards	2018	Best Fantasy Television Series	The Good Place	Nominated	
Saturn Awards	2019	Best Fantasy Television Series	The Good Place	Nominated	
Teen Choice Awards	2018	Choice Comedy TV Actress	Kristen Bell	Nominated	
Teen Choice Awards	2018	Choice Comedy TV Show	The Good Place	Nominated	
Teen Choice Awards	2019	Choice TV Villain	Adam Scott	Nominated	
Television Critics Association Awards	2017	Individual Achievement in Comedy	Kristen Bell	Nominated	
Television Critics Association Awards	2017	Outstanding Achievement in Comedy	The Good Place	Nominated	
Television Critics Association Awards	2017	Outstanding New Program	The Good Place	Nominated	
Television Critics Association Awards	2018	Individual Achievement in Comedy	Ted Danson	Nominated	
Television Critics Association Awards	2018	Outstanding Achievement in Comedy	The Good Place	Won	
Television Critics Association Awards	2018	Program of the Year	The Good Place	Nominated	
Television Critics Association Awards	2019	Outstanding Achievement in Comedy	The Good Place	Nominated	
Television Critics Association Awards	2020	Outstanding Achievement in Comedy	The Good Place	Nominated	
Writers Guild of America Awards	2019	Television: Comedy Series	The Good Place (Note: Megan Amram, Christopher Encell, Kate Gersten, Cord Jefferson, Andrew Law, Joe Mande, Kassia Miller, Dylan Morgan, Matt Murray, Rae Sanni, Daniel Schofield, Michael Schur, Josh Siegal, Jen Statsky, and Tyler Straessle)	Nominated	
