= Janet(s) =

- The Good Place episode
- Michael (Ted Danson) and Janet (D'Arcy Carden) observe the four humans as Janets (also played by Carden).
- Episode no.: Season 3 Episode 10
- Directed by: Morgan Sackett
- Written by: Josh Siegal; Dylan Morgan
- Original air date: December 6, 2018
- Running time: 22 minutes

Guest appearances
- Stephen Merchant as Neil; Eugene Cordero as Pillboi; Brad Morris as Matt

Episode chronology
← Previous "Don't Let the Good Life Pass You By"	Next → "The Book of Dougs"
- The Good Place season 3

"Janet(s)" is the tenth episode of the third season of the American fantasy-comedy television series The Good Place. The thirty-sixth episode of the series overall, it originally aired in the United States on NBC on December 6, 2018, as the show's mid-season finale. "Janet(s)" was written by Josh Siegal and Dylan Morgan and directed by Morgan Sackett.

After rediscovering the afterlife earlier in the season, Eleanor, Chidi, Tahani, and Jason help others on Earth alongside afterlife architect Michael and assistant Janet. In the episode, the four humans find themselves transformed into versions of Janet as they seek to escape demons from the Bad Place. Eleanor tries to address her romantic feelings for Chidi and has an identity crisis when he denies any feelings for her. Meanwhile, Michael and Janet visit Accounting, the section of the afterlife that calculates point totals for people's good and bad actions during their lives, to determine if the Bad Place is manipulating the points system.

The premise of the episode originated during production of the show's second season, and the writers studied concepts of identity and the self for the episode. D'Arcy Carden, who plays multiple versions of Janet in the episode, prepared for her role by watching rehearsals of her castmates and following the actors between scenes. Filming took place in July 2018 and required significantly more visual effects than normal; several crew members wondered during production if the finished product would make sense.

Seen by 2.58 million viewers in its original broadcast, "Janet(s)" received praise from critics; Carden's performance earned widespread acclaim. The episode was ranked as one of 2018's best television episodes by many publications. Analysis has focused on its discussion of the meaning of the self, as well as why nobody had reached the Good Place in over five centuries. The episode won the Hugo Award for Best Dramatic Presentation, Short Form, and Siegal and Morgan were nominated for the Primetime Emmy Award for Outstanding Writing for a Comedy Series for their work on it.

== Plot ==
When Janet (D'Arcy Carden) brings Eleanor, Chidi, Tahani, and Jason into her void – an alternate dimension tied to her essence – the four humans are accidentally transformed into versions of Janet. The original Janet gives each person different clothes to identify them before she and Michael (Ted Danson) leave to visit Accounting. The humans stay in Janet's void, as they are now fugitives within the afterlife.

Michael and Janet meet the head accountant, Neil (Stephen Merchant). Neil insists the Bad Place cannot be tampering with the afterlife points system, but agrees to show them the system anyway. He explains that everything someone does on Earth is assigned a positive or negative point value. If something new occurs, an accountant gives it a value based on its intentions, effects, and other factors. Every new value is verified by three billion other accountants, leaving no room for tampering. Despite this, Michael asks to see Doug Forcett's file. (Note: Doug Forcett was introduced in the series premiere, "Everything Is Fine", as the only human to correctly guess how the afterlife works. In the previous episode, "Don't Let the Good Life Pass You By", Michael and Janet visit Doug; they learn that he seeks to maximize good in everything he does even though this has made his life miserable.) Neil finds the Book of Dougs and says Doug is on track for the Bad Place. Michael considers this proof of tampering, as Doug has spent his life devoted to good actions. He asks to see a file for someone on track for the Good Place; Neil reveals nobody has reached the Good Place in 521 years.

In Janet's void, Eleanor-Janet talks with Chidi-Janet about their past romantic relationships. Chidi-Janet argues those experiences happened to him in different lives. He cites several philosophers to prove his point, but Eleanor-Janet becomes frustrated and thinks he is avoiding a discussion of his feelings. Meanwhile, Jason-Janet and Tahani-Janet discover signs of Janet's romantic feelings for Jason. After more failed attempts to get Chidi-Janet to talk, Eleanor-Janet wonders why she is bothering to reach out to him. Her resulting identity crisis causes her to change into random bodies, and Janet's void begins to collapse. To restore her identity, Chidi-Janet lists off Eleanor's memories and the good things she has done before ultimately kissing her. This causes the four humans to both regain their normal appearances and be ejected from Janet's void. Michael, Janet, and the humans flee from the accountants; Michael takes the Book of Dougs with him. The six escape via a pneumatic tube and arrive in a mailroom. Eleanor (Kristen Bell) realizes they are in the Good Place.

== Production ==
=== Development and writing ===
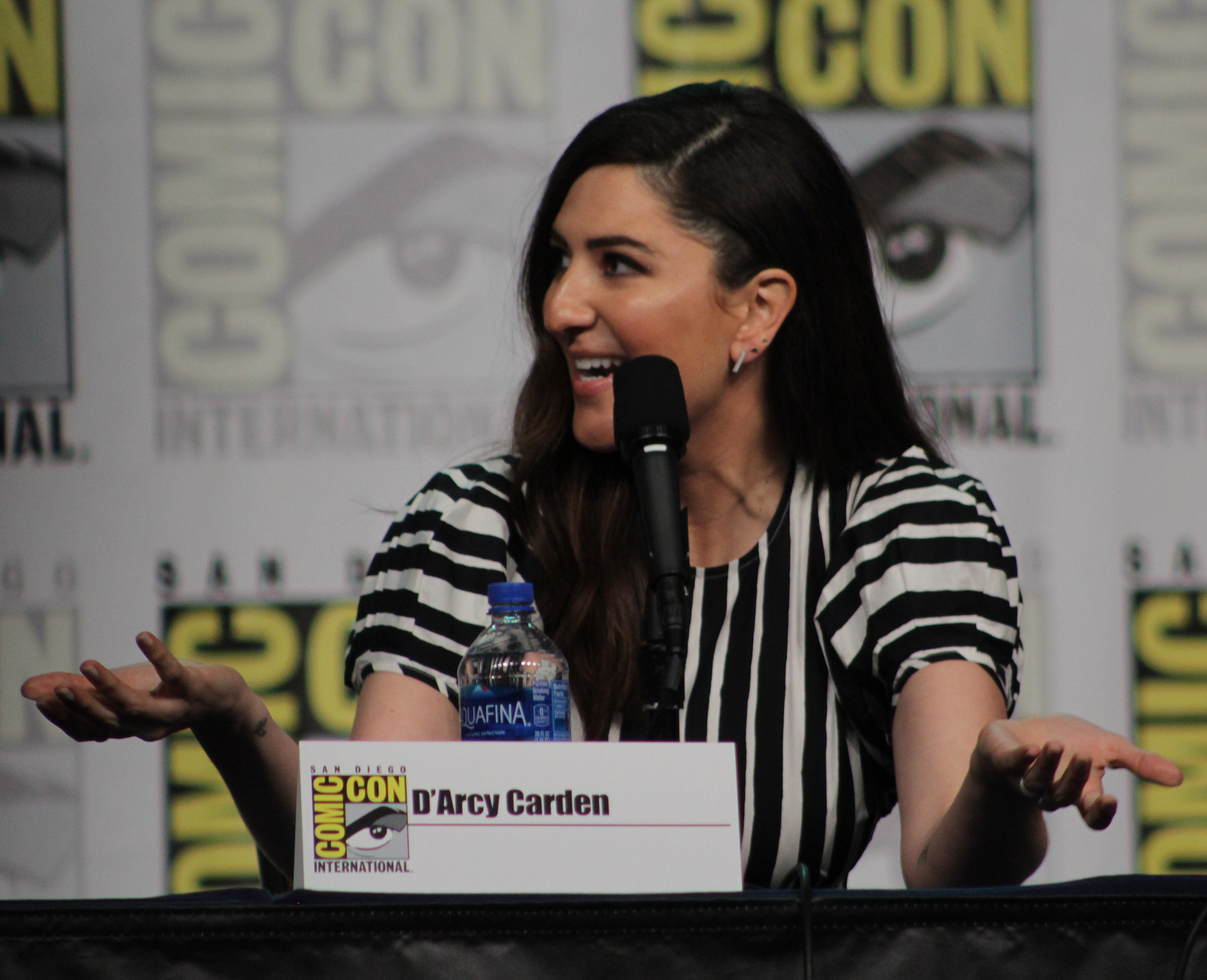
D'Arcy Carden plays her normal role as Janet in the episode, as well as each of the four humans and a "Neutral Janet".

According to series creator Michael Schur, the idea for an episode featuring multiple Janets originated during the show's second season, over a year before the episode aired. The crew discussed locations that had not been explored yet, as the characters had visited the Bad Place already and were going to visit Earth in the second-season finale. One such location was Janet's void, which led to the idea of Carden playing all four humans. Schur and the other writers were initially concerned such an idea might be too challenging to accomplish, but realizing that other shows such as Orphan Black had pulled it off provided them with the confidence to move forward. Planning for the episode began right after the second season ended production. At one point, the idea was only going to be included in the first act, but the writing staff did not want to use the concept as a "gimmick", so they reworked the idea to have Eleanor question her sense of self while trapped inside a Janet. The writing staff also met with philosophical advisors Todd May and Pamela Hieronymi to learn about concepts of identity and the self before writing the episode. Writers Josh Siegal and Dylan Morgan sent a draft of the script to May for input; he suggested small tweaks to improve how the relevant philosophical theories were explained.

Schur told Carden to begin preparing for the episode in March 2018, four months before the episode would be filmed. Carden later said she was surprised when she learned about the episode and was grateful that the writers and producers trusted her to pull it off. For the episode, Carden plays a wide range of characters, including her normal character, each of the four humans as a Janet, a "Neutral Janet" in Accounting, and one scene in which she plays Eleanor pretending to be Jason. The cast began rehearsing for the episode earlier than normal to provide references for Carden's impressions. Her co-stars recorded footage of their performances for Carden to listen to and review, including a rehearsal on set with the cast playing their usual characters. The actors' movements during these performances were also tracked for use with special effects. Additionally, Carden followed the actors around when she was not in scenes and would mimic what they were doing. The other cast members provided help in various ways as Carden was learning to portray them; for instance, William Jackson Harper sent a copy of Chidi's lines the way he liked to memorize them, while Manny Jacinto showed her a video that inspired his portrayal of Jason. Carden later explained that she struggled to perform her impression of Harper as Chidi even though she could imagine it, and she found Bell's subtle actions to be hard to emulate.

=== Filming ===
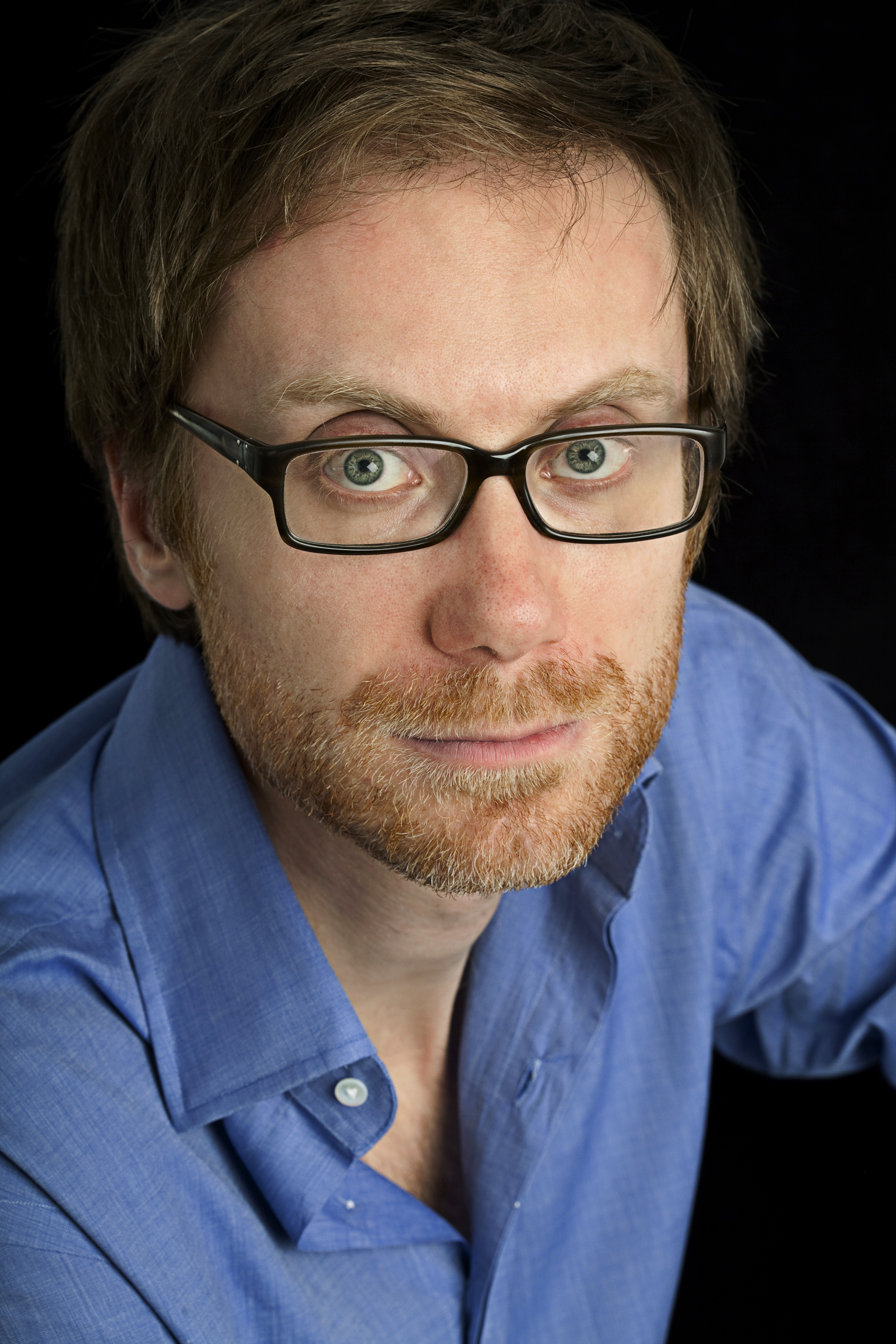
Stephen Merchant guest-stars in the episode as Neil, the head of Accounting.

Filming took place over five and a half days in July 2018. For the episode, Janet's void was represented by an entirely white set, though director Morgan Sackett decided to add furniture to prevent the audience from becoming bored by the setting. Filming required significantly more planning and visual effects than normal; Schur later called it "the opposite of how [they] usually make television" due to the precision required. In a separate interview, Schur described it as both "an extreme bottle episode" due to the limited setting and cast, and "the opposite of a bottle episode" because of the level of detail required. Though some scenes used stand-ins in costumes and wigs, many were filmed with only poles to represent the other characters. Carden later called those scenes the hardest part of filming for her, describing it as "kind of los[ing] your mind a little bit". A particularly difficult shot was the climactic kiss due to how Carden's body had to be positioned and the alignment of the shots. To film one part of the scene, she had to kiss a pair of wax lips placed atop a pole. The height differences between Carden and Bell added to the scene's challenges. After combining her multiple roles, Carden spent about 40 minutes performing in the episode, which was only 22 minutes long.

At one point, Eleanor transforms into a series of different individuals as she loses her sense of self. Morgan and Siegal credited the idea to Schur and explained that they carefully scripted what each new person said for both emotional impact and humor based upon who would say the line. Visual effects producer David Niednagel added special effects to simulate the void and the furniture breaking up as Eleanor's struggles continue. As her void becomes unstable, Janet accidentally sings an excerpt of Cher's "Believe". Carden sang a version of the song for the episode, which was then auto-tuned, but the episode ultimately used Cher's recording because it was easier to get permission to use that version. Carden, Schur, and Siegal all remarked that there were instances during filming when the crew wondered if the final product would make any sense.

Merchant, co-creator of the British version of The Office, makes a guest appearance in the episode; Schur worked as a writer on The Office's American adaptation. In the episode, Merchant holds a mug reading "Existence's Best Boss", an allusion to a similar mug used by Michael Scott. The prop was printed with the slogan, but Merchant held it the wrong way during filming, so the words were reapplied using special effects during post-production.

== Analysis ==
One of the episode's themes is the meaning of the self; Chidi even leads a lecture on the topic within the episode. Schur remarked that the premise forces Eleanor to ask herself, "Who am I? What version of me am I right now?" Philosophy professor Alison Reiheld argues that Chidi's understanding of and relationship with Eleanor, not their kiss, is what saves her. As Reiheld explains, stories provide the scaffolding for "moral self-definition"; once Chidi reminds her of her personal history, Eleanor can act in the way that "best reflects who she is and wants to be". Vox's Emily St. James notes that after centuries of other lifetimes, the four humans felt uncertain of their true selves, remarking that "who you are is a little arbitrary, if you stop to think about it". Because of this, Chidi and Eleanor stop thinking about it and simply "hope for the best". Conversely, Dane Sawyer, a professor of philosophy and religion, argues that Eleanor's identity crisis is good for her. Sawyer explains that Buddhists believe attachment to one's sense of self can cause suffering, so Eleanor confronting the idea of "no-self" could be a step towards enlightenment and nirvana. However, Sawyer adds that compassion is one of Buddhism's chief virtues, and a person who moves past one's sense of self will naturally be compassionate, so Chidi's actions were not necessarily wrong.

Another major topic of discussion was the reveal that nobody had reached the Good Place in 521 years. Several critics speculated as to why this happened. Alan Sepinwall, writing for Rolling Stone, suspected that the Bad Place had gamed the system, which was too flawed to realize it was broken. St. James suggested that modern life makes it too difficult to be a truly good person due to our effects on others in the present and future. This idea would be proven correct in the next episode, "The Book of Dougs", which revealed that the complex links in modern society lead to negative points even for well-intentioned actions. Philosophy instructor Laura Matthews calls this a virtually guaranteed outcome of the point system due to its use of deontological and consequentialist ethics. The show's writers had considered who would have reached the Good Place, but according to Schur, they eventually realized it was impossible to find an "Incontrovertibly Great Person" in recent history based on their criteria.

== Reception ==
=== Ratings ===
In its original broadcast on December 6, 2018, "Janet(s)" was seen by 2.58 million American viewers and received a 0.8 rating (Note: The rating of a program is the estimated portion of the specified group watching the program, expressed as a percentage.) among adults ages 18–49. The episode placed fourth in its time slot, behind Thursday Night Football, Young Sheldon, and A Charlie Brown Christmas. Both measurements were the lowest of the season up to that point, though ratings rose when the show returned in January 2019. After factoring in seven-day DVR viewership, the episode received 4.23 million viewers and a 1.5 rating in the 18–49 demographic.

=== Reviews ===
"Janet(s)" received highly positive reviews from critics; many considered it a major improvement over the season's earlier episodes. Dennis Perkins of The A.V. Club called it the ideal version of a mid-season finale with plenty of "incident and action". He remarked that while Janet had been sidelined for much of the third season, this episode marked a significant course correction. Vulture's Noel Murray described the idea to turn the humans into Janets as a "masterstroke" that elevated a routine plotline. He deemed it a "dividing line" within the history of the show and, like Perkins, praised it for giving Carden more to do as Janet after receiving smaller roles earlier in the season. Alec Bojalad of Den of Geek praised the episode for both the creativity of the premise and the emotional truths the humans face.

Entertainment Weekly's Darren Franich deemed "Janet(s)" the best episode of season three by far and felt the show was reaching its "runaway-train phase" at the end of the season. He said the revelation about nobody reaching the Good Place in centuries was, in some ways, the show's biggest twist yet. Sepinwall remarked that the show's return to the afterlife helped to produce one of its best episodes. He found himself appreciating the Eleanor-Chidi relationship more and praised Michael's growth as he took the situation into his own hands. St. James found the episode to be "a surprisingly romantic and sweet story" and praised the setup for future episodes, particularly after the less enjoyable episodes from earlier in the season.

Carden's performance in the episode, which was described as a "showcase" for her character, was widely singled out for acclaim. Brian Grubb of Uproxx called it "one of the best television comedy performances by one person" he could recall. Perkins called it "marvelous", noting the details she was able to incorporate into each impression. Bojalad applauded Carden's ability to realistically depict the conflict between Eleanor and Chidi without using the main actors and described the episode as Carden "at the absolute height of [her] powers". St. James praised the show and Carden for committing to the premise and nailing the performances, suggesting that Carden deserved an Emmy for the performance. The editors of Paste named Carden's performance as Janet as their top television performance of 2018 and singled out her role in "Janet(s)" for displaying her talent.

The episode was ranked among the best of the year by numerous publications. In an unranked top-ten list, Daniel Fienberg of The Hollywood Reporter remarked that it was able to advance the story and hit emotional beats while not using most of the main cast. Esquire's Justin Kirkland also placed it in his top-ten list, describing it as "a triple threat of episodes: excellent acting, excellent narrative, and impressive visual stunts". In The New York Times's list of the year's most memorable episodes, James Poniewozik credited the show's strong writing for allowing its characters to all be played by Carden while maintaining their traits. The episode was also ranked seventh for the year by Entertainment Weekly and twenty-first by both IndieWire and The Guardian.

=== Awards and nominations ===
The episode resulted in several nominations for major awards. It received the Hugo Award for Best Dramatic Presentation, Short Form, the show's second of four consecutive wins in the category. For their work on the episode, Siegal and Morgan were nominated for the Primetime Emmy Award for Outstanding Writing for a Comedy Series, ultimately losing to Phoebe Waller-Bridge for "Episode 1" from Fleabag. The episode was also nominated for an ADG Excellence in Production Design Award for Half Hour Single-Camera Series and a Golden Reel Award for Outstanding Achievement in Sound Editing – Live Action Under 35:00. Some people, including Schur, felt that Carden's lack of an Emmy nomination following the episode was a snub. Carden was nominated for Outstanding Supporting Actress in a Comedy Series for her role the subsequent year.
