= The Brainy Bunch =

- The Good Place episode
- Episode no.: Season 3 Episode 3
- Directed by: Jude Weng
- Written by: Dan Schofield
- Original air date: October 4, 2018

Episode chronology
← Previous "Everything Is Bonzer!"	Next → "The Snowplow"
- The Good Place (season 3)

"The Brainy Bunch" is the third episode of the third season of the American fantasy-comedy television series The Good Place, and the 29th episode overall. The episode was written by Dan Schofield and directed by Jude Weng, and first aired on NBC on October 4, 2018.

== Plot ==
Trevor interferes with the humans; he drives Chidi away from the others by suggesting that Chidi's friendship with the subjects threatens clinical results, and he steers Jason and Tahani towards a meaningless hookup, all the while smothering the humans with overtures of friendship. Michael and Janet go to Earth, but struggle to hinder Trevor without their powers; Janet is perturbed by her inability to summon objects. Jason helps a drunk Tahani get home safely, but their friendship remains platonic. Eleanor is saddened by the loss of Chidi's friendship and mentorship, and she does not arrive for the next group meeting. Chidi, encouraged by Simone, affirms that he is Eleanor's friend, and she agrees to continue in the study. Judge Gen summons Michael, Janet, and Trevor back to the afterlife, and hurls a fawning Trevor into a void. She declares that the experiment is over; the humans must meet the normal threshold to get into the Good Place. Gen orders Michael and Janet to return to the Bad Place, where he would be forcibly retired and she deactivated. Janet's powers return and, as her queued-up summoned objects appear and overwhelm Gen, Janet and Michael flee to Earth.

== Reception ==
=== Ratings ===
The episode was watched live by 2.96 million viewers, and had a ratings share of 0.9/4, during its original broadcast. In terms of live viewership the episode was the third highest viewed of the season.

=== Critical response ===
Dennis Perkins of The A.V. Club rated the episode B, noting that it "rushes ahead of our expectations" and questions the moral system. Perkins criticises the "Aussie all-American restaurant gags" which "comes off just the wrong side of wacky" and forced.

Alec Bojalad of Den of Geek described Trevor as a "worthy adversary".

Darren Frainch of Entertainment Weekly gave the episode an A.

Noel Murray of Vulture rated the episode five out of five stars, noting that "there’s nothing unusual or experimental" about the episode but it's still "very, very funny" and "a joy to watch from start to finish".
