= The Good Place season 3 =

The Good Place
- Season 3
- Promotional poster
- Starring: Kristen Bell; William Jackson Harper; Jameela Jamil; D'Arcy Carden; Manny Jacinto; Ted Danson
- No. of episodes: 13

Release
- Original network: NBC
- Original release: September 27, 2018 – January 24, 2019

Season chronology
- ← Previous; Season 2 Next → Season 4

The third season of the fantasy-comedy television series The Good Place, created by Michael Schur, was renewed on November 21, 2017, on NBC, and began airing on September 27, 2018, in the United States. The season is produced by Fremulon, 3 Arts Entertainment, and Universal Television. The season concluded on January 24, 2019, and contained thirteen episodes.

The series focuses on Eleanor Shellstrop (Kristen Bell), a deceased young woman who wakes up in the afterlife and is welcomed by Michael (Ted Danson) to "the Good Place" in reward for her righteous life; however, she eventually discovers that Michael's "Good Place" is a hoax, and she is actually in the "Bad Place" being psychologically and emotionally tortured by her fellow afterlife residents. William Jackson Harper, Jameela Jamil, and Manny Jacinto co-star as other deceased human residents of the faux Good Place who are similarly being tormented, together with D'Arcy Carden as an artificial being helping the inhabitants. In the third season, the deceased humans have been returned to life on Earth to allow them another chance to improve morally, with some guidance from Michael. Each of the episodes is listed as "Chapter (xx)" following the opening title card.

== Cast ==
=== Main ===
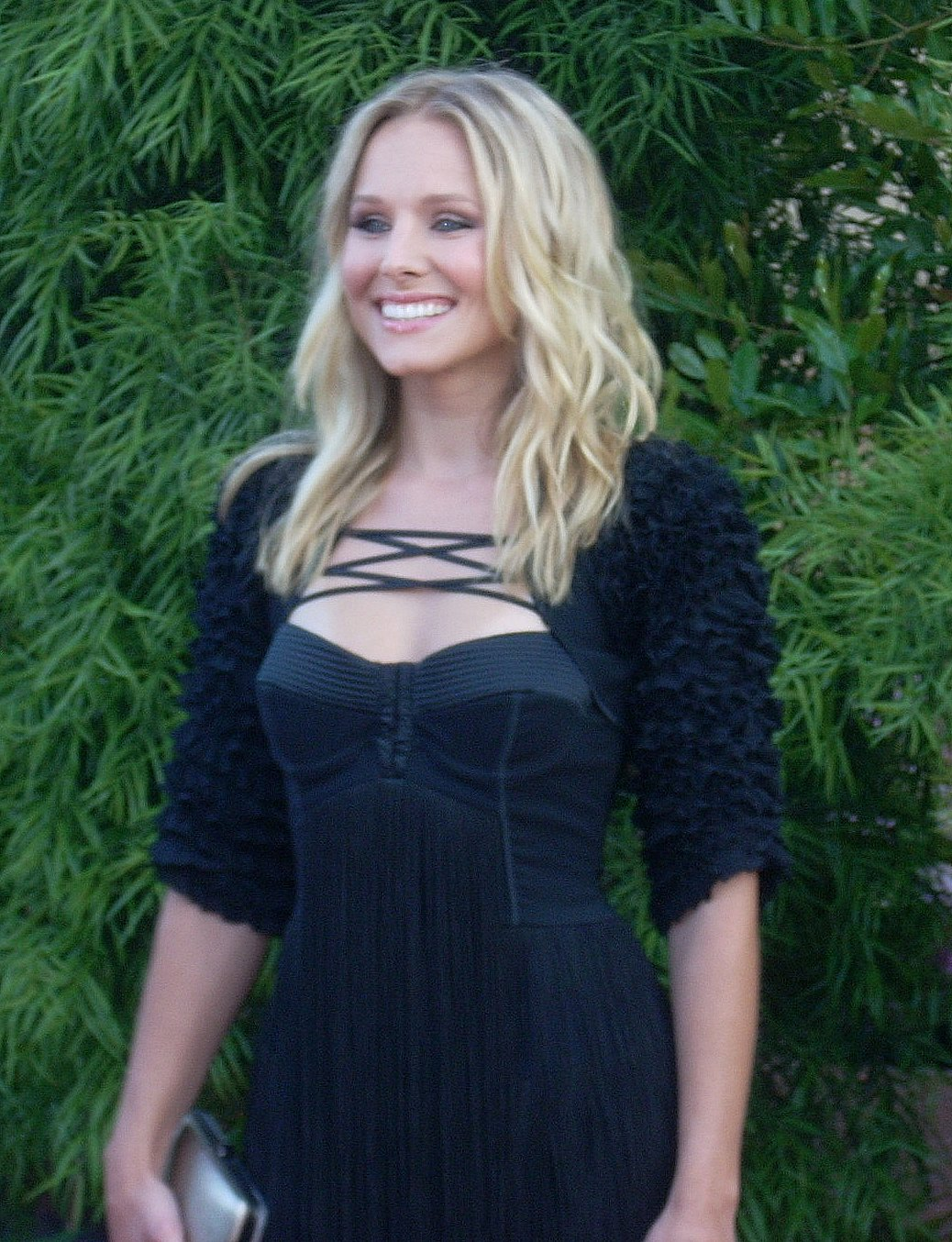
Kristen Bell portrays series protagonist Eleanor Shellstrop.

- Kristen Bell as Eleanor Shellstrop, a deceased, selfish saleswoman from Phoenix, Arizona who winds up in the Good Place by mistake. In order to earn her spot, she recruits Chidi to teach her the fundamentals of becoming a better person.
- William Jackson Harper as Chidi Anagonye, a deceased Senegalese professor of ethics and moral philosophy at an Australian university. Assigned as Eleanor's soulmate in Michael's first Good Place experiment, he gives her ethics lessons in an attempt to make her a better person.
- Jameela Jamil as Tahani Al-Jamil, a deceased, wealthy English philanthropist who believes she belongs in the Good Place. She forms an unlikely friendship with Eleanor, who initially dislikes her positive attitude, condescending way of speaking, and tendency to name drop.
- D'Arcy Carden as Janet, a programmed guide and knowledge bank who acts as the Good Place's main source of information and can provide its residents with whatever they desire. Later, Janet gains a more humanlike disposition, and begins to act differently than the way she was designed.
  - Carden also plays Bad Janet, a disrespectful version of Janet designed not to respond to residents properly; Neutral Janet, an impartial, robotic version of Janet that works in the Accountant's Office; and, for one episode, Janet-versions of Eleanor, Chidi, Tahani, and Jason.
- Manny Jacinto as Jason Mendoza, a deceased amateur DJ and drug dealer from Jacksonville, Florida who winds up in the Good Place by mistake. He is introduced as Jianyu Li, a Taiwanese monk who took a vow of silence. Later, Jason proves to be an immature and unintelligent, but kindhearted Jacksonville Jaguars and Blake Bortles fan.
- Ted Danson as Michael, an architect who runs the Good Place neighborhood in which Eleanor, Chidi, Tahani, and Jason reside. Michael has a deep affinity for the mundane aspects of human life, like playing with paper clips or searching for one's car keys. "Michael" is a Hebrew name meaning "who is like God?"

=== Recurring ===
- Marc Evan Jackson as Shawn, Michael's wicked boss. Shawn gives Michael two chances to pull off the torture experiment, and later turns against him when he finds out about Michael's betrayal.
- Maya Rudolph as Judge Gen (short for Hydrogen), an eternal judge who rules on interdimensional matters between the Good Place and the Bad Place.
- Kirby Howell-Baptiste as Simone Garnett, an Australian neuroscientist and, briefly, Chidi's girlfriend.
- Mike O'Malley as Jeff, the gatekeeper of the doorway between the afterlife and Earth. He has an affinity for frogs.
- Adam Scott as Trevor, a cruel Bad Place demon who bullies the main group. He makes a return in the third season, posing as an overenthusiastic member of Chidi's academic study on Earth.
- Ben Lawson as Larry Hemsworth, Tahani's former boyfriend and the fictional fourth Hemsworth brother. Despite being very attractive and successful, he constantly beats himself up.
- Eugene Cordero as Pillboi, Jason's best friend and partner in crime.
- Rebecca Hazlewood as Kamilah Al-Jamil, Tahani's massively successful and competitive younger sister.
- Ajay Mehta as Waqas Al-Jamil, Tahani's father.
- Anna Khaja as Manisha Al-Jamil, Tahani's mother.
- Tiya Sircar as Vicky Sengupta, a Bad Place demon who is introduced as the "real Eleanor Shellstrop" in the first attempt of Michael's torture plan.
- Maribeth Monroe as Mindy St. Claire, a deceased corporate lawyer and cocaine addict who just barely toed the line of earning enough Good Place points before her death and thus was awarded her own private Medium Place.
- Jason Mantzoukas as Derek, a wacky artificial rebound boyfriend created by Janet.

=== Guest ===
- Mitch Narito as Donkey Doug, Jason's dopey father.
- Leslie Grossman as Donna Shellstrop, Eleanor's vain, negligent mother. In the third season, it is revealed that she has found peace as a PTA mom in a Nevada suburb.
- Andy Daly as Dave Katterttrune, Donna's boyfriend.
- Michael McKean as Doug Forcett, a Canadian man who has devoted his entire life to earning enough points to get into the Good Place.
- Stephen Merchant as Neil, the head accountant of the afterlife.
- Nicole Byer as Gwendolyn, a postal worker in the Good Place.
- Paul Scheer as Chuck, a member of the Good Place Committee.
- Brad Morris as Matt, an accountant working in a neutral office between the Good Place and the Bad Place, made suicidal by working in "Weird Sex Things".

== Episodes ==
Season 3 episodes
No. overall	No. in season	Title	Directed by	Written by	Original release date	U.S. viewers (millions)
27 (Note: The third-season premiere aired in an hour-long episode, but NBC ordered 13 episodes.)	1	"Everything Is Bonzer!" (Part 1)	Dean Holland	Jen Statsky & Michael Schur	September 27, 2018	3.13
Judge Gen authorizes Michael to travel to Earth, where he saves Eleanor's, Chidi's, Jason's, and Tahani's lives, creating a new timeline, but strictly forbids any more interference. Michael and Janet monitor the humans, who reform for six months but eventually revert to their previous lifestyles. Chidi explores his brain health with a neuroscientist, Simone, but gives up decisiveness after his coworker Henry is injured following Chidi's advice to lose weight. Michael returns to Earth to influence the humans to meet one another. He leads Eleanor to seek out Chidi and primes Chidi to be willing to work with her; Chidi agrees to teach Eleanor about moral philosophy. Michael is concerned when Eleanor encourages Chidi to date Simone, but Janet reassures him that Chidi and Eleanor have connected meaningfully when they were not romantically involved. Shawn leads a Bad Place team that tries to hack into Gen's system; Michael's trips to Earth open a backdoor that Shawn's team exploits.
28	2	"Everything Is Bonzer!" (Part 2)	Dean Holland	Jen Statsky	September 27, 2018	3.13
Chidi and Simone go on a date, and he kisses her after Eleanor protests his indecision. Chidi and Simone conceive a joint-study thesis to examine the effect of near-death experiences on brain function in ethical decision-making. Michael continues returning to Earth illicitly. Tahani finds enlightenment in a monastery, but returns to her fame-chasing ways after writing a bestselling book about the experience; Michael poses as a sleazy businessman who likens himself to Tahani, repulsing her into joining the study. Jason devotes himself to dance competitions and forbids his crewmates from committing crimes, but returns to crime after the crew suffers continual failures; Michael tries to lure Jason to Australia to run a dance crew, but he has already been soul-searching and wants to find a deeper meaning in life, and decides to participate in the study. Eleanor, Chidi, Tahani, and Jason meet in Australia but, to Michael's dismay, the Bad Place sends Trevor to participate in the study.
29	3	"The Brainy Bunch"	Jude Weng	Dan Schofield	October 4, 2018	2.96
Trevor interferes with the humans; he drives Chidi away from the others by suggesting that Chidi's friendship with the subjects threatens clinical results and he steers Jason and Tahani towards a meaningless hookup, all the while smothering the humans with overtures of friendship. Michael and Janet go to Earth, but struggle to hinder Trevor without their powers; Janet is perturbed by her inability to summon objects. Jason helps a drunk Tahani get home safely, but their friendship remains platonic. Eleanor is saddened by the loss of Chidi's friendship and mentorship, skipping the next group meeting. Chidi, encouraged by Simone, affirms that he is Eleanor's friend, so she agrees to continue in the study. Judge Gen summons Michael, Janet, and Trevor back to the afterlife and hurls Trevor into a void. She declares that Michael has caused too much of a ripple effect with his interference on Earth – causing, among other things, Brexit, the success of The Greatest Showman, the Jacksonville Jaguars qualifying for the 2017 NFL playoffs, and Byron Allen purchasing The Weather Channel – and that the experiment is over; the humans must meet the normal threshold to get into the Good Place. Gen orders Michael and Janet to return to the Bad Place, where he will be forcibly retired and she deactivated. Janet's powers return and, as her queued-up summoned objects appear and overwhelm Gen, Janet and Michael flee to Earth.
30	4	"The Snowplow"	Beth McCarthy-Miller	Joe Mande	October 11, 2018	2.71
Michael and Janet spy on their human friends for a year, manipulating them to ensure they stay together and focus on their project: they give Eleanor an $18,000-winning lottery ticket so she will not take time away for a job, reconnect Tahani with her Australian ex-boyfriend Larry (an accomplished but insecure brother of Chris and Liam Hemsworth), help Jason meet local Jaguars fans, and provide Chidi with state-of-the-art teaching equipment. When Tahani decides to move to London with now-fiancé Larry, Chidi concludes the group should disband so he can begin studying new participants. When the others are not receptive to her suggestion that the group stay together, Eleanor lashes out. Simone advises Eleanor that she is reacting to the loss of the first group with which she has ever identified. Eleanor apologizes and the four agree to reunite annually. Dissatisfied, Michael convinces Janet that they should sneak into Judge Gen's office and reset the timeline, but the humans discover them opening the portal.
31	5	"Jeremy Bearimy"	Trent O'Donnell	Megan Amram	October 18, 2018	2.70
Michael and Janet confess their identities and reveal the group's experiences in the Bad Place, which lasted 300 years of nonlinear time. The explanation prevents the humans from earning points and dooms them to the Bad Place upon death. Michael and Janet write a manifesto, planning to turn themselves in to Judge Gen and deliver their recommendations. Tahani gives $2 million anonymously to the Sydney Opera House; Jason then leads her to distribute money to people they think need it. Eleanor attempts to return to being a bad person, but is unwilling to steal money from a wallet she finds, instead tracking down its owner to return it. Chidi has a breakdown, buying $880 worth of peeps and cooking them into a pot of chili during class; he describes philosophies embodied by the characters: virtue ethics, consequentialism, deontology, and nihilism. Eleanor confronts Chidi and brings him to Michael and Janet. Tahani and Jason arrive; all six agree to Eleanor's plan to do good and help other people get into the Good Place. Tahani has married Jason in order to transfer half her wealth to him; Larry arrives to start his life with Tahani.
32	6	"The Ballad of Donkey Doug"	Rebecca Asher	Matt Murray	October 25, 2018	2.67
Tahani (who has since broken up with Larry) and Michael travel to Jacksonville with Jason, who tries to save his father, Donkey Doug, by helping him start a career as an electrician. Donkey Doug and Pillboi have a get-rich-quick scheme to sell a combination energy drink and body spray made from stolen materials. Jason accepts that Donkey Doug is a lost cause and decides to help Pillboi instead; he takes Pillboi's place at a robbery, and Donkey Doug leads the police on a chase so Jason can escape. Jason tells Pillboi that he, Tahani, and Michael are astronaut-spies and that Pillboi's mission is to fulfill his duties at his nursing home job, where he is competent and kind, and not commit crimes. In Sydney, Chidi decides to break up with Simone to avoid contaminating her afterlife. Janet provides a virtual reality simulation, but the actual breakup still goes badly; at Eleanor's urging, Chidi speaks to Simone again and they part regretfully but amicably. The six unite in Budapest, where Tahani intends to reconcile with her sister. Janet and Michael tell Eleanor that her mother faked her death and she is alive.
33	7	"A Fractured Inheritance"	Beth McCarthy-Miller	Kassia Miller	November 1, 2018	2.72
In Nevada, Eleanor and Michael confront Eleanor's mother, Donna, who faked her death to avoid fulfilling a drunken charity auction bid. As "Diana Tremaine", Donna has established a seemingly normal suburban life with her boyfriend Dave and his daughter, Patricia. Eleanor is determined to prove Diana is scamming Dave, consistent with Eleanor's past experience with her; mostly, she acts out of jealousy that Donna was never the responsible mother to her that she is to Patricia. When Eleanor discovers a hidden stash of money, Donna admits she kept it so she can flee if she should ever need to. Rather than gloat, Eleanor convinces Donna to enjoy her new life and to use the money to properly raise Patricia. Eleanor laments her emotional distancing from others, and Michael tells her that she and Chidi were once in love. Tahani tries to make peace with Kamilah in Budapest. Kamilah refuses Tahani's apology, prompting Tahani to vandalize Kamilah's art exhibit. Tahani realizes that Kamilah's primary inspiration has been their parents' emotional cruelty in forcing them to compete against each other; Tahani embraces Kamilah, who returns the hug and credits Tahani as co-creator of the exhibit, maintained in its damaged state.
34	8	"The Worst Possible Use of Free Will"	Claire Scanlon	Cord Jefferson	November 8, 2018	2.77
Michael shows Eleanor her memories of falling in love with Chidi in the afterlife. When they both grew suspicious of Michael, they fled to the Medium Place, where they slept together and professed their love to each other. Returning to the neighborhood, they confronted Michael, who rebooted them again. Eleanor believes her relationship with Chidi was deterministic because Michael controlled their entire world, but he explains that he often failed to predict her behavior. Eleanor nevertheless argues that free will does not exist and Michael's behavior could have been determined by other, unknown influencers; he argues that, if everything is determined, their efforts are pointless, but he wants to believe otherwise. Michael suggests Eleanor is being defensive to avoid vulnerability. They mutually apologize, and Eleanor admits to avoiding her feelings. The Soul Squad reunites in Arizona. Eleanor suggests that, as the world's "only truly free beings", they should make more impact on the world; Michael directs them to Canada to find a "blueprint for humanity". Shawn and Vicky travel to Earth via an illegal portal.
35	9	"Don't Let the Good Life Pass You By"	Dean Holland	Andrew Law	November 15, 2018	2.69
In Alberta, Canada, Michael and Janet find Doug Forcett, who has lived according to the afterlife points system since accurately hallucinating it while on magic mushrooms in the 1970s. He lives simply, self-sufficiently, and charitably, but miserably; obsessed with points, he will go to great lengths to please any person or creature but does nothing for himself. Michael advises Doug to live as he pleases, but Doug refuses, fearing he might not accumulate enough points to enter the Good Place. The four humans wait at a bar where demons, led by Shawn, capture them, planning to abduct them, Michael, and Janet to the Bad Place. Michael and Janet return; Janet fights off the demons, her powers restored by contact with the portal, and forces them back to the afterlife. Eleanor tells Chidi that they were in love and that she might be in love with him again. Before being dispatched, Shawn gloats that the humans' loved ones will go to the Bad Place, as will Doug. Michael suspects the points system is truly flawed; he intends to investigate the afterlife accountants. When more demons arrive, Janet transports Michael and the humans to her void, causing the humans' deaths on Earth.
36	10	"Janet(s)"	Morgan Sackett	Josh Siegal & Dylan Morgan	December 6, 2018	2.58
Arriving in Janet's void, the humans discover they have all taken on Janet's appearance, leading to confusion until Janet conjures individualized clothing for them. Janet and Michael visit Accounting, leaving the humans in the void. Head Accountant Neil informs Janet and Michael that nobody has been admitted to the Good Place in 521 years, and even Doug Forcett is not close to the points threshold. Neil refuses to believe the Bad Place has hacked the points system, and Janet urges Michael to fix the problems himself. Jason and Tahani learn that Janet and Jason were once married, and Eleanor confronts Chidi over their romantic history. Chidi denies any romantic feelings for her and states that he is not the Chidi who loved her, causing Eleanor to have an identity crisis that threatens to collapse Janet's void. Chidi restores her sense of self by kissing her, stabilizing the void and restoring the humans' physical appearances. All four are ejected from the void, appearing in Accounting with Michael and Janet. Michael takes a book containing the point totals of all people named Doug, and transports Janet, the humans, and himself via pneumatic tube to an office in the Good Place.
37	11	"The Book of Dougs"	Ken Whittingham	Kate Gersten	January 10, 2019	2.72
In the Good Place "correspondence center", the group's arrival alerts postal worker Gwendolyn. Michael poses as a neutral Accountant. Everyone in the Good Place is pleasant, unsuspicious, and devoted to obeying rules. A committee takes Michael's concerns seriously but, to his dismay, they intend to spend 400 years just to select a team of investigators. Eleanor tries and fails to breach a door into the Good Place proper, after which Chidi creates a romantic first date for her. She cries over her complicated emotions and pulls Chidi into a closet for sex. Tahani tries to make Janet and Jason feel better about their past relationship, but she inadvertently upsets them repeatedly. The three acknowledge their shared feelings of love. Tahani's difficulties make Michael realize that the Bad Place has not interfered with the points system, but instead, the increasing complexity of modern life has introduced unintended consequences to all actions and decisions, resulting in net point losses for ostensibly good acts. Michael, Janet, and the humans leave to meet the Judge at the IHOP – the Interdimensional Hole of Pancakes.
38	12	"Chidi Sees the Time-Knife"	Jude Weng	Christopher Encell & Joe Mande	January 17, 2019	2.52
In the IHOP, Jason and Janet decide to start dating. After Jason's impassioned speech on the human condition, Gen agrees to live on Earth; after her time there, she acknowledges humans are at a disadvantage in moral decision-making and may be better than their point totals suggest. She pulls Shawn into a meeting; he maintains that humans are fundamentally bad, but the humans' ability to improve casts doubt on Shawn's claim. Chidi suggests the experiment be repeated with new subjects. The parties reach terms: Michael will design another fake "Good Place" neighborhood, and Shawn will select four new moderately bad humans to live in it, with the humans having one year to improve. Mindy St. Claire allows the neighborhood to be built in the Medium Place. Janet creates progeny to serve as the rest of its residents with the help of Derek, who has improved through repeated reboots; Jason is disconcerted that Derek is Janet's ex. Shawn tells Michael that, should the experiment fail, Michael's friends' torturers will be disguised as Michael. Alone with Eleanor in his office, Michael is incapacitated by a panic attack as the first new human, John, wakes up in the waiting room.
39	13	"Pandemonium"	Michael Schur	Megan Amram & Jen Statsky	January 24, 2019	2.39
Failing to rouse Michael, Eleanor poses as the Architect and welcomes John. Tahani realizes John is a gossip columnist who tormented her; Shawn has chosen residents with challenging personal connections to the four. The second new resident is Simone, which the humans object to, arguing that her prior history with the group would ruin the experiment. Gen allows Simone to stay, but permits Michael to erase her memories of the four humans. Chidi believes he will be unable to avoid contaminating the experiment and asks Michael to erase his memories too, which will require him to forget Eleanor. Michael shows Chidi and Eleanor footage of the many iterations of their relationship. Chidi trusts that Eleanor will protect him and that they will eventually spend eternity together. Eleanor asks Janet the meaning of existence; Janet responds that love between humans is special because the "pandemonium" of the Universe cannot be understood; she pledges her support to Eleanor. Eleanor welcomes the now-amnesiac Chidi to the neighborhood.

== Reception ==
=== Critical response ===
The third season received critical acclaim. On Rotten Tomatoes, the third season has a rating of 98%, based on 47 reviews, with an average rating of 8.35/10. The site's critical consensus reads, "Charming and curious as ever, The Good Place remains a delightfully insightful bright spot on the television landscape." On Metacritic, the third season has a score of 96 out of 100, based on reviews from five critics, indicating "universal acclaim".

=== Accolades ===
For the 71st Primetime Emmy Awards, the series received four nominations–for Outstanding Comedy Series, Ted Danson for Outstanding Lead Actor in a Comedy Series, Maya Rudolph for Outstanding Guest Actress in a Comedy Series, and Josh Siegal and Dylan Morgan for Outstanding Writing for a Comedy Series for the episode "Janet(s)". "Janet(s)" also won the Hugo Award for Best Dramatic Presentation, Short Form, with the episode "Jeremy Bearimy" also nominated. Several critics expressed dismay that D'Arcy Carden was not nominated for her work in the episode "Janet(s)", where she portrayed most of the main characters.

== Ratings ==
Viewership and ratings per episode of The Good Place season 3
No.	Title	Air date	Rating/share (18–49)	Viewers (millions)	DVR (18–49)	DVR viewers (millions)	Total (18–49)	Total viewers (millions)
1	"Everything Is Bonzer! (Part 1)"	September 27, 2018	1.0/4	3.13	0.7	1.89	1.7	5.03
2	"Everything Is Bonzer! (Part 2)"	September 27, 2018	1.0/4	3.13	0.7	1.89	1.7	5.03
3	"The Brainy Bunch"	October 4, 2018	0.9/4	2.96	0.8	1.81	1.7	4.77
4	"The Snowplow"	October 11, 2018	0.8/4	2.71	0.8	1.72	1.6	4.43
5	"Jeremy Bearimy"	October 18, 2018	0.8/3	2.70	0.8	1.75	1.6	4.47
6	"The Ballad of Donkey Doug"	October 25, 2018	0.8/3	2.67	0.8	1.71	1.6	4.38
7	"A Fractured Inheritance"	November 1, 2018	0.8/3	2.72	0.7	1.65	1.5	4.33
8	"The Worst Possible Use of Free Will"	November 8, 2018	0.8/3	2.77	0.7	1.69	1.5	4.46
9	"Don't Let the Good Life Pass You By"	November 15, 2018	0.8/3	2.69	0.7	1.68	1.5	4.37
10	"Janet(s)"	December 6, 2018	0.8/3	2.58	0.7	1.65	1.5	4.23
11	"The Book of Dougs"	January 10, 2019	0.9/4	2.72	0.9	2.03	1.8	4.76
12	"Chidi Sees the Time-Knife"	January 17, 2019	0.8/4	2.52	0.9	2.01	1.7	4.54
13	"Pandemonium"	January 24, 2019	0.7/3	2.39	0.9	2.04	1.6	4.46
