= Everything Is Bonzer! =

- The Good Place episodes
- Episode nos.: Season 3 Episodes 1 & 2
- Directed by: Dean Holland
- Written by: Jen Statsky; Michael Schur (Part 1)
- Original air date: September 27, 2018

Episode chronology
← Previous "Somewhere Else"	Next → "The Brainy Bunch"
- The Good Place season 3

"Everything Is Bonzer!" is the two-part season premiere of the third season of the NBC series The Good Place. The twenty-seventh and twenty-eighth episodes of the series overall, they were written by Jen Statsky, with series creator Michael Schur for the first part and directed by Dean Holland. The episodes first aired on NBC on September 27, 2018.

== Plot ==
Judge Gen authorizes Michael to travel to Earth, where he saves Eleanor's, Chidi's, Jason's, and Tahani's lives, creating a new timeline, but strictly forbids any more interference. Michael and Janet monitor the humans, who reform for six months but eventually revert to their previous lifestyles. Chidi explores his brain health with a neuroscientist, Simone, but gives up decisiveness after his coworker Henry is injured following Chidi's advice to lose weight. Michael returns to Earth to influence the humans to meet one another. He leads Eleanor to seek out Chidi, and primes Chidi to be willing to work with her; Chidi agrees to teach Eleanor about moral philosophy. Michael is concerned when Eleanor encourages Chidi to date Simone, but Janet reassures him that Chidi and Eleanor have connected meaningfully when they were not romantically involved. Shawn leads a Bad Place team that tries to hack into Gen's system; Michael's trips to Earth open a backdoor that Shawn's team exploits.

Chidi and Simone go on a date, and he kisses her after Eleanor protests his indecision. Chidi and Simone conceive a joint-study thesis to examine the effect of near-death experiences on brain function in ethical decision-making. Michael continues returning to Earth illicitly. Tahani finds enlightenment in a monastery, but returns to her fame-chasing ways after writing a bestselling book about the experience; Michael poses as a sleazy businessman who likens himself to Tahani, repulsing her, and she joins the study. Jason devotes himself to dance competitions and forbids his crew-mates from committing crimes, but returns to crime after the crew suffers continual failures; Michael tries to lure Jason to Australia to run a dance crew, only to find that Jason has already been soul-searching and wants to find a deeper meaning in life, and thus is easily convinced to participate in the study. Eleanor, Chidi, Tahani, and Jason meet in Australia, but to Michael's dismay, the Bad Place sends Trevor to participate in the study.

== Reception ==
=== Ratings ===
The episode was watched live by 3.13 million viewers, and had a ratings share of 1.0/4, during its original broadcast.It currently has 8.1/10 rating on IMDb.

=== Critical response ===
Dennis Perkins of The A.V. Club rated the episode A−, noting that the episode continues to defy expectations, complimenting the "gracefully plotted and uproarious double episode". Noel Murray of Vulture rated the episode four out of five stars, complimenting the "tricks of televisual storytelling" used by the creative team "to speedily get the characters where" they need them to be.

Alec Bojalad of Den of Geek noted that "it really is amazing what this show can do". Darren Franich of Entertainment Weekly rated the episode B+, complimenting the "fun reset" for a show that has gone through three structural reboots, as well as Kirby Howell-Baptiste's addition to the cast.
