= The Good Place =

American fantasy-comedy television series (2016–2020)

- Genre: Comedy; Philosophical fiction; Fantasy; Utopian and dystopian fiction
- Created by: Michael Schur
- Showrunner: Michael Schur
- Starring: Kristen Bell; William Jackson Harper; Jameela Jamil; D'Arcy Carden; Manny Jacinto; Ted Danson
- Composer: David Schwartz
- Country of origin: United States
- Original language: English
- No. of seasons: 4
- No. of episodes: 53 (list of episodes)

Production
- Executive producers: Michael Schur; David Miner; Morgan Sackett; Drew Goddard
- Producers: David Hyman; Joe Mande; Megan Amram
- Cinematography: Barry Peterson; David J. Miller
- Editors: Colin Patton; Matthew Barbato; Eric Kissack
- Camera setup: Single-camera
- Running time: 22 minutes
- Production companies: Fremulon; 3 Arts Entertainment; Universal Television

Original release
- Network: NBC
- Release: September 19, 2016 – January 30, 2020

The Good Place is an American fantasy-comedy television series created by Michael Schur for NBC. The series premiered on September 19, 2016, and concluded on January 30, 2020, after four seasons consisting of 53 episodes.

Although the plot evolves significantly over the course of the series, the initial premise of the series follows Eleanor Shellstrop (Kristen Bell), a dead woman who is placed in the "Good Place", a Heaven-esque utopia designed and supervised by afterlife "architect" Michael (Ted Danson). However, Eleanor knows that she does not deserve it, and she attempts to avoid being found out and sent to the hell-like "Bad Place" by hiding her morally imperfect past behavior while trying to become a more ethical person. William Jackson Harper, Jameela Jamil, and Manny Jacinto co-star as other residents of the Good Place, with D'Arcy Carden as Janet, an advanced artificial being who assists the residents. Over the course of the series, Eleanor and the others learn lessons in ethics that shift their perspectives and influence their choices.

The Good Place received critical acclaim for its originality, writing, acting, setting, and tone. Its plot twists were particularly praised, as were the show's exploration and creative use of ethics and philosophy. Among its accolades, the series received a Peabody Award and four Hugo Awards for Best Dramatic Presentation, Short Form. It was nominated for 14 Primetime Emmy Awards, including Outstanding Comedy Series for its last two seasons.

== Premise and synopsis ==
The series is centered on an afterlife in which humans are sent to "the Good Place" or "the Bad Place" after death. All deceased are assigned a numerical score based on the morality of their conduct in life, and only those with the very highest scores are sent to the Good Place, where they enjoy eternal happiness with their every wish granted, guided by an artificial intelligence named Janet; all others experience an eternity of torture in the Bad Place.

In the first season, amoral loner Eleanor and small-time crook Jason believe they have been sent to the Good Place incorrectly. Eleanor's soulmate, Chidi, a moral philosopher, attempts to teach them ethics so they can earn their place. Jason's soulmate, the wealthy socialite Tahani, attempts to help Michael, the kindly designer of their afterlife neighborhood, deal with the chaos apparently caused by Eleanor and Jason's presence. In a twist ending, Eleanor realizes that the four humans have actually been in the Bad Place all along, selected by Michael to torture each other emotionally and psychologically for eternity.

In the second season, Michael repeatedly erases the humans' memories to try to restart their psychological torture, but they figure out the truth each time. After many reboots, Michael grows to genuinely care for the four, and sees that, contrary to the accepted wisdom of those in charge of the afterlife, humans can improve their goodness after they die. Michael appeals their case to the Judge, who settles disputes in the afterlife; she rules that the humans may be returned to their lives on Earth, with no memory of the afterlife, to attempt to prove their "true" moral character.

Back on Earth in the third season, the group is reunited by Michael's intervention. They participate in a research study led by Chidi and his colleague Simone, but Michael, continuing to meddle, blows his cover. Having learned about the afterlife again, they try to help others improve their moral behavior to get into the Good Place. Eventually, they discover that no one has been admitted to the Good Place in centuries. They convince the Judge to allow them to run an experiment to show that humans can improve their moral character when freed from the challenges of modern Earth life.

In the final season, the group begins their experiment in a new simulated Good Place neighborhood with three new human subjects plus Chidi. The Bad Place repeatedly tries to sabotage the experiment, but in the end, the humans show moral growth. A new afterlife system is created, in which deceased humans can confront their moral weaknesses and improve. Eleanor, Chidi, Tahani, Jason, Michael, and Janet are admitted to the actual Good Place, where their final challenge is to find a way to make eternal happiness fulfilling, so that all humans can find peace and meaning in their existence.

== Cast and characters ==
=== Main ===
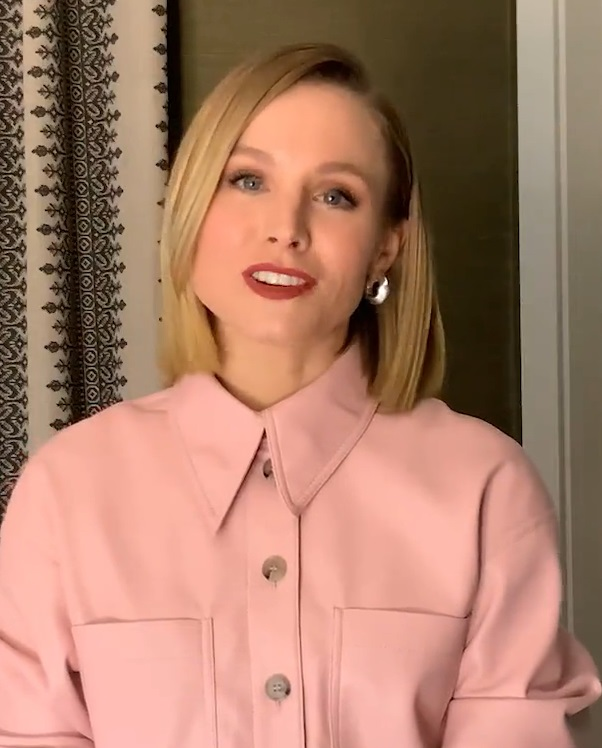
Kristen Bell portrays series protagonist Eleanor Shellstrop.

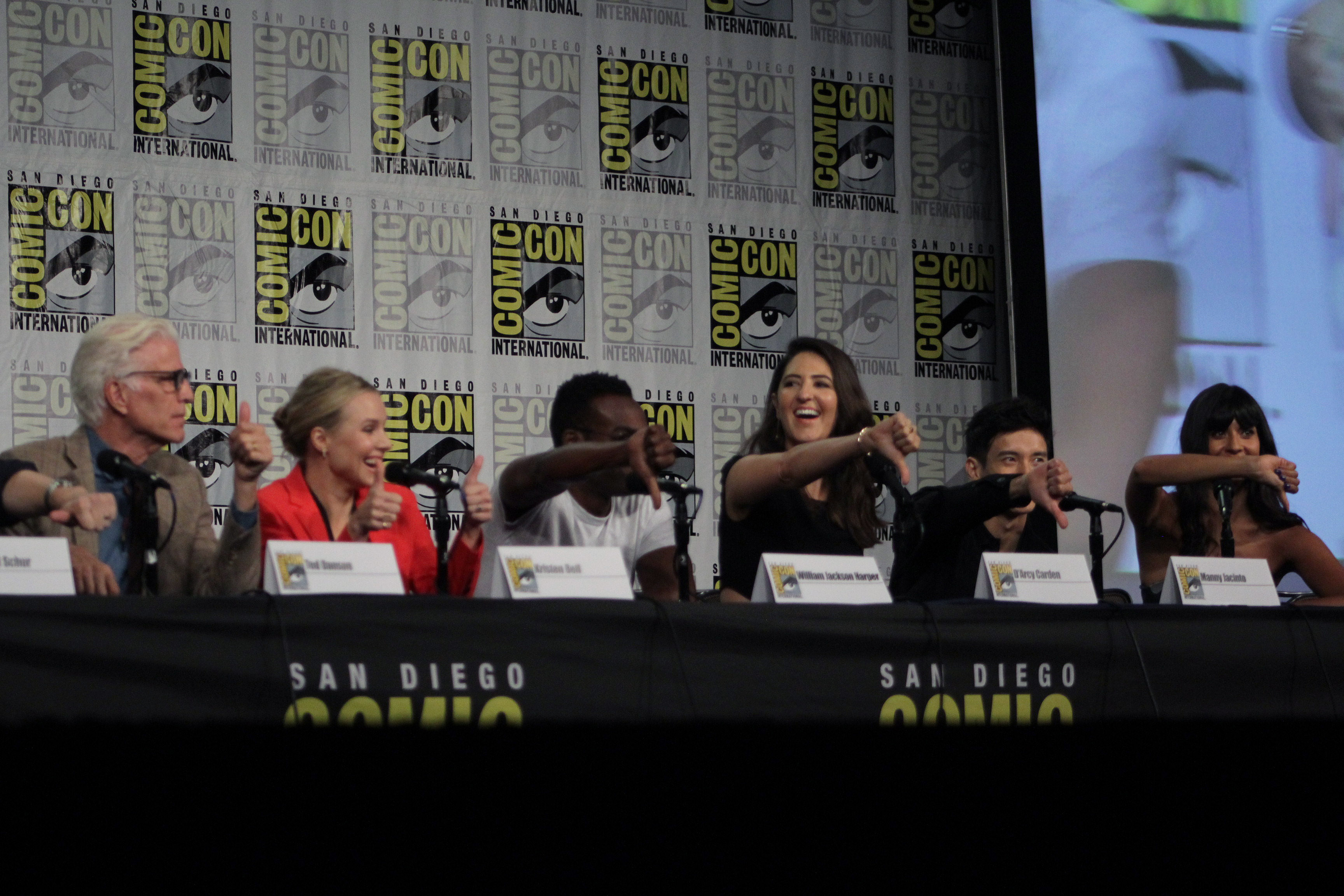
The cast of The Good Place at the 2018 San Diego Comic-Con

- Kristen Bell as Eleanor Shellstrop, a deceased American woman from Phoenix, Arizona, who seemingly winds up in the Good Place due to being mistaken for an unrelated lawyer with the same name who exonerated innocent clients facing death sentences; in truth, this Eleanor was a selfish, rude pharmaceutical saleswoman who cared only about herself. In order to actually earn her spot, she recruits Chidi to teach her the fundamentals of becoming a better person, all while hiding her true identity from Michael and the other inhabitants.
- William Jackson Harper as Chidi Anagonye, a deceased French-speaking Senegalese professor of ethics and moral philosophy who taught at universities in France and Australia. Although he is kind, supportive and highly-qualified, his inability to make choices frequently leaves him overthinking, overanxious and indecisive, often resulting in poor decision-making. Assigned as Eleanor's soulmate in Michael's Good Place, he gives her ethics lessons in an attempt to make her a better person.
- Jameela Jamil as Tahani Al-Jamil, a deceased wealthy British Pakistani philanthropist and fashion model who forms an unlikely friendship with Eleanor, who initially dislikes Tahani's positive attitude, tendency to name-drop, and perceived condescension; Tahani hides deeply buried insecurities from the way her family treated her.
- D'Arcy Carden as Janet, a programmed guide and anthropomorphic knowledge bank who acts as the Good Place's main source of information and can provide its residents with whatever they desire. She is described as a foundational mainframe for all neighborhoods across the Good and Bad Places. Later, Janet gains a more humanlike disposition and begins to act differently from the way she was designed.
  - Carden also portrays multiple Janet iterations throughout the series. Among them are "Bad Janet", a Bad Place counterpart specifically designed by the demons to respond to residents in an inappropriate and impolite manner; "Neutral Janet", an impartial, robotic version of Janet that works in the Accountant's Office; "Disco Janet" who is "fun, but a lot" and, in "Janet(s)", Janet-versions of Eleanor, Chidi, Tahani, and Jason.
- Manny Jacinto as Jason Mendoza, a deceased Filipino American amateur disc jockey and drug dealer from Jacksonville, Florida. He is introduced as Jianyu Li, a Taiwanese Buddhist monk who took a vow of silence; however, he, like Eleanor, was seemingly brought to the Good Place by mistake, and joins in her efforts to become better people. Jason has a child-like personality, kindhearted and positive, but also immature, clueless and impulsive.
- Ted Danson as Michael, an immortal being who works as the "architect" who runs the afterlife neighborhood in which Eleanor, Chidi, Tahani, and Jason reside. Michael is originally introduced as an angel from the Good Place who holds a fascination with the mundane aspects of human life, like playing with paper clips or searching for one's car keys. However, he is revealed in the first-season finale to actually be a demon who despises humanity and tortured Eleanor, Chidi, Tahani and Jason all along in a Bad Place masquerading as a Good Place. In late seasons, he finds himself allying and then genuinely befriending them. "Michael" is a Hebrew name meaning "who is like God". The character of Michael was based on the archangel Michael.

=== Recurring ===
==== Demons ====
- Tiya Sircar as Vicky, a Bad Place demon who portrays the "real Eleanor Shellstrop", whose position in the Good Place Eleanor supposedly stole in the first season. In the second season, when Michael's plans repeatedly fail, she tries to blackmail Michael into giving her control over the neighborhood. Late in the series, Michael places her in charge of introducing the other demons to the revised afterlife system.
- Adam Scott as Trevor, a cruel Bad Place demon who bullies the main group. He makes a return in the third season posing as an overenthusiastic member of Chidi's academic study on Earth, only to be later exiled by the Judge upon being discovered.
- Marc Evan Jackson as Shawn, Michael's wicked boss and ruler of the Bad Place, who at first pretends to be the Judge, an impartial godlike being who decides on matters of the universe. Shawn gives Michael two chances to pull off the torture experiment and later turns against him when he finds out about Michael's betrayal. He is also the main character of the spin-off web series The Selection.
- Luke Guldan as Chris Baker, a muscular Bad Place demon. After initially struggling to play Eleanor's gym rat soulmate in Michael's second neighborhood, he eventually adopts much of this persona into his actual personality. Chris is a minor antagonist on multiple occasions.
- Bambadjan Bamba as Bambadjan, a Bad Place demon pretending to be a lawyer in the Good Place. He is among the more cunning of Shawn's demons.
- Josh Siegal as Glenn, a Bad Place demon pretending to be a cheerfully dopey Good Place resident. He is among the few demons to show actual concern for another being. He blows up in "Tinker, Tailor, Demon, Spy", but reconstitutes himself with time.

==== Humans ====
- Maribeth Monroe as Mindy St. Claire, a deceased corporate lawyer and addict who died in the process of founding a charity she had planned during a cocaine high. The charity generated enough good points after her death that her point total exceeded that required to enter the Good Place. As a compromise, the Judge ruled that she would receive her own private Medium Place, where everything is mediocre and grounded in the 1980s.
- Kirby Howell-Baptiste as Simone Garnett, an Australian neuroscientist and, briefly, Chidi's girlfriend. She is also the second test subject to be sent to the experimental Good Place, but initially believes that the entire neighborhood is a hallucination generated by her brain at the moment of death.
- Eugene Cordero as Steven "Pillboi" Peleaz, Jason's best friend and partner in crime. Jason, Tahani and Michael manage to convince him to avoid criminal behavior and focus on his career in elder care so that he could get into the Good Place.
- Mitch Narito as Donkey Doug, Jason's dopey father and other partner in crime. Doug treats Jason as more of a "homie" than a son, and their familial relation is not revealed until the third season. Doug is Jason's first choice to reform into deserving the Good Place, but he proves too set in his ways.
- Dominic Burgess as Henry, Chidi's Australian coworker who buys a pair of unattractive Cowboy boots that he asks Chidi if he likes. Chidi lies and says that he does like them, which bothers him for two years.
- Rebecca Hazlewood as Kamilah Al-Jamil, Tahani's exceedingly successful and competitive younger sister. Tahani died attempting to humiliate her and often struggles with feelings of inferiority compared to her.
- Ajay Mehta and Anna Khaja as Waqas and Manisha Al-Jamil, Tahani's verbally abusive parents, who are the true cause behind her and Kamilah's relationship.
- Leslie Grossman as Donna Shellstrop, Eleanor's cruel, self-centered, negligent mother. In the third season, it is revealed that she faked her death in Arizona and reformed herself as a PTA mom in a Nevada suburb.
- Keston John as Uzo, Chidi's best friend. He had long suffered from Chidi's indecisiveness and witnessed Chidi's original death.
- Brandon Scott Jones as John Wheaton, the first test subject sent to the experimental Good Place. In life, he was a gossip columnist and published inflammatory articles, especially about Tahani.
- Ben Koldyke as Brent Norwalk, a bigoted and arrogant corporate chief executive, and the fourth test subject sent to the experimental Good Place. He proves to be a significant wrench in Eleanor and Michael's plans, as Michael's old methods do not work on him as they did on Eleanor.
- Michael McKean and Noah Garfinkel as Doug Forcett, a Canadian who once took psychedelics (circa 1970) and coincidentally guessed the workings of the afterlife to a far higher degree of precision than any known religion or prophet. Michael keeps a picture of Forcett on his office wall, which is seen in many episodes. (Garfinkel, a friend of the producers, was the image used for this picture of Forcett.) In a later episode, Michael McKean portrays a much older, neurotic Forcett who lives a torturously frugal and self-sacrificial life to avoid the Bad Place. Garfinkel is later briefly seen in a sequence as a younger Forcett.

==== Other celestial beings ====
- Jason Mantzoukas as Derek, a malfunctioning artificial rebound boyfriend created by Janet. Gifted by the humans to Mindy for helping them escape the fake Good Place, he gets "rebooted" an extreme number of times over the course of the series and becomes more advanced and slightly less off-kilter each time.
- Maya Rudolph as Gen, short for Hydrogen. She is the true Judge of the universe, who has near-omnipotent governance over reality and mediates affairs between the Good Place and Bad Place. She first oversees trials of worthiness for the four humans, and later oversees Michael's experiments in seasons 3 and 4.
- Mike O'Malley as Jeff the Doorman, the gatekeeper of the doorway between the afterlife and Earth. He has an affinity for frogs.
- Paul Scheer as Chuck, leader of the Good Place committee. Ostensibly wanting to help Eleanor and her friends, the committee is very hesitant to take any actual action and is overly deferential to any demands by the Bad Place in negotiations. Chuck and the rest of the committee abandon the Good Place after tricking Michael into accepting responsibility over it, having run out of ideas of how to lift the ennui hanging over its residents.
- Stephen Merchant as Neil, the manager in the Accounting office where all the life points are calculated. He reveals that nobody has been sent to the Good Place for about 500 years.

== Episodes ==
Season	Episodes	Originally released		Rank	Average viewers (in millions inc. DVR)
Season	Episodes	First released	Last released	Rank	Average viewers (in millions inc. DVR)
1	13	September 19, 2016	January 19, 2017	77	5.72
2	13	September 20, 2017	February 1, 2018	77	5.78
3	13	September 27, 2018	January 24, 2019	99	4.57
4	14	September 26, 2019	January 30, 2020	92	3.56

== Production ==
=== Casting ===
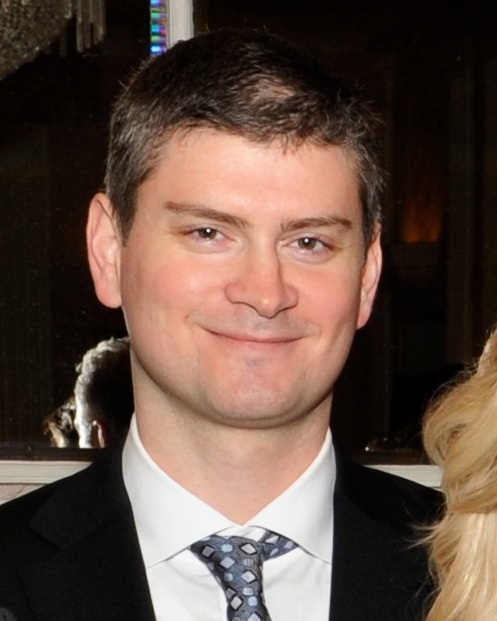
Series creator and executive producer Michael Schur

NBC issued a press release on August 13, 2015, announcing it had given the then-untitled show a 13-episode order based purely on a pitch by Michael Schur. On January 12, 2016, it was announced that Kristen Bell and Ted Danson had been cast in the lead roles for the series. The first synopsis of the show was also released, stating that it would revolve around Eleanor designing her own self-improvement course with Michael as her guide – although the afterlife element had always been a part of the series, as Bell stated she was aware of the first-season finale twist when she signed on.

William Jackson Harper was cast as Chris on February 11, 2016, though the character was renamed Chidi. Jameela Jamil was cast as Tessa on February 25, 2016, and her character was renamed Tahani. On March 3, 2016, Manny Jacinto was revealed to have been cast as a "sweet and good-natured Jason" whose "dream is to make a living as a DJ in Southern Florida". On March 14, 2016, D'Arcy Carden was cast as a series regular announced as "Janet Della-Denunzio, a violin salesperson with a checkered past" – although writer Megan Amram later admitted that this was a hoax.

=== Development ===
The show's final premise, including the afterlife element, was announced on May 15, 2016, when NBC announced its 2016–17 TV season.

According to Schur, they originally planned to include religious elements after doing research on various faiths and groups. Instead, he decided on a more diverse concept that included all faiths and was free of religious views. "I stopped doing research because I realized it's about versions of ethical behavior, not religious salvation," he says. "The show isn't taking a side, the people who are there are from every country and religion." He also pointed out that the setting (shot in San Marino, California's Huntington Gardens) already had the feeling of a pastiche of different cultures, and said the neighborhoods would feature people who were part of nondenominational and interdenominational backgrounds who interacted with each other regardless of religion.

The series' setting and premises, as well as the serialized cliffhangers, were modeled on Lost, a favorite of Schur's. One of the first people he called when he developed the series was Lost co-creator Damon Lindelof. "I took him to lunch and said, 'We're going to play a game [of] 'Is this anything?'" He then added "I imagine this going in the Lost way, with cliffhangers and future storylines."

The first season's surprise twist, that the Good Place was the Bad Place, and Chidi, Eleanor, Jason and Tahani were chosen because they were best suited to torture each other indefinitely, is very similar in premise to philosopher Jean-Paul Sartre's stage play No Exit, where three strangers die and are escorted to a single room by a friendly bellhop and informed they must co-exist. They ultimately determine they are entirely incompatible and reach the conclusion that "hell is other people". Danson and Bell were the only actors who knew the ultimate premise from the start.

Critics have suggested similarities to the 1960s surreal TV show The Prisoner in its isolated, rule-bound setting.

== Broadcast and release ==
The series premiered September 19, 2016. On January 30, 2017, NBC renewed the series for a second season of 13 episodes, which premiered on September 20, 2017, with an hour-long opening episode. On November 21, 2017, NBC renewed the series for a 13-episode third season, which premiered on September 27, 2018. On December 4, 2018, NBC renewed the series for a fourth season, which premiered on September 26, 2019. On June 7, 2019, it was announced that the fourth season would be the last.

=== International ===
In several international territories, the show is distributed on Netflix. The first season was released September 21, 2017, and episodes of subsequent seasons became available within 24 hours of their U.S. broadcast.

=== Home media ===
Home media releases for The Good Place were distributed by the Shout! Factory. The first season was released on DVD in region 1 on October 17, 2017, the second on July 17, 2018, and the third on July 30, 2019. The complete series was released on Blu-ray on May 19, 2020.

== Reception ==
=== Ratings ===
Viewership and ratings per season of The Good Place
Season	Timeslot (ET)	Episodes	First aired		Last aired		TV season	Viewership rank	Avg. viewers (millions)
Season	Timeslot (ET)	Episodes	Date	Viewers (millions)	Date	Viewers (millions)	TV season	Viewership rank	Avg. viewers (millions)
1	Thursday 8:30 pm (Note: Outside of the regular time slot, the series premiere aired at Monday 10:00 pm, the second season premiere aired at Wednesday 10:00 pm and the third season premiere aired at Thursday 8:00 pm.)	13	September 19, 2016	8.04	January 19, 2017	3.93	2016–17	77	5.72
2	Thursday 8:30 pm	13	September 20, 2017	5.28	February 1, 2018	3.19	2017–18	77	5.78
3	Thursday 8:30 pm (2018); Thursday 9:30 pm (2019)	13	September 27, 2018	3.13	January 24, 2019	2.39	2018–19	99	4.57
4	Thursday 9:00 pm (2019); Thursday 8:30 pm (2020)	14	September 26, 2019	2.42	January 30, 2020	2.32	2019–20	92	3.56

=== Critical response ===
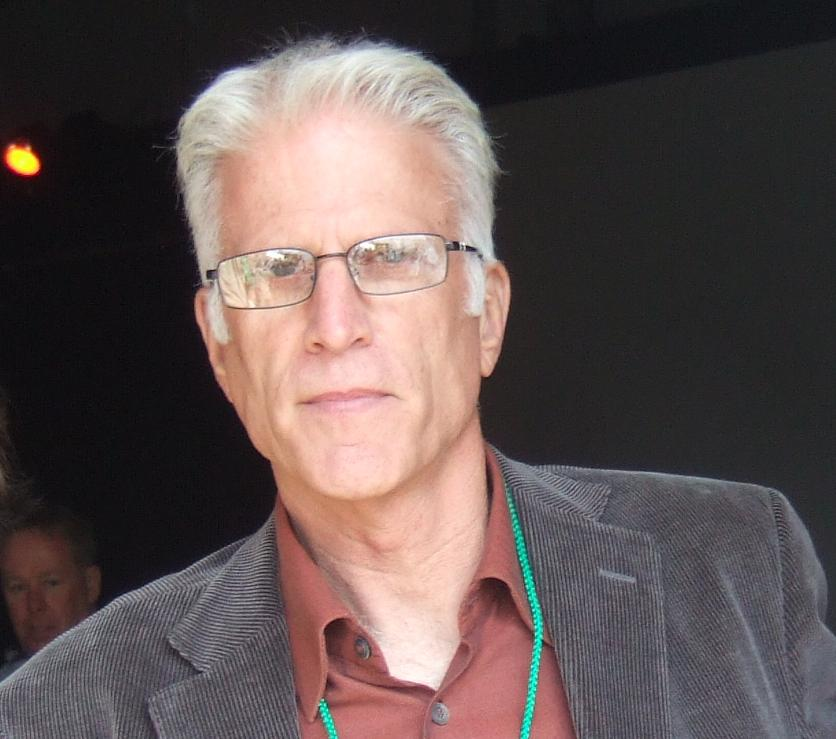
Ted Danson's performance on the series received critical acclaim.

Critical response of The Good Place
Season	Rotten Tomatoes	Metacritic
1	92% (74 reviews)	78 (32 reviews)
2	100% (59 reviews)	87 (10 reviews)
3	98% (47 reviews)	96 (5 reviews)
4	100% (53 reviews)	—N/a

The Good Place has received widespread acclaim from television critics. On Rotten Tomatoes, the first season has a rating of 92%, based on 74 reviews, with an average rating of 7.80/10. The site's critical consensus reads, "Kristen Bell and Ted Danson knock it out of the park with supremely entertaining, charming performances in this absurd, clever and whimsical portrayal of the afterlife." On Metacritic, the first season has a score of 78 out of 100, based on reviews from 32 critics, indicating "generally favorable reviews".

The editors of TV Guide placed The Good Place second among the top ten picks for the most anticipated new shows of the 2016–17 season. In its review from writer Liam Matthews, "NBC's new comedy has an impressive pedigree" (referring to Mike Schur and stars, Kristen Bell and Ted Danson, the latter cited as "arguably the greatest sitcom actor of all time"). Matthews concludes, "The hope is that their combined star power can restore NBC's tarnished comedy brand to its former glory. It won't be the next Friends, but it's something even better: a network comedy that feels different than anything that's come before."

On Rotten Tomatoes, the second season has a rating of 100%, based on 59 reviews, with an average rating of 9.0/10. The site's critical consensus reads, "By voluntarily blowing up its premise, The Good Place sets up a second season that proves even funnier than its first." On Metacritic, the second season has a score of 87 out of 100, based on reviews from 10 critics, indicating "universal acclaim".

On Rotten Tomatoes, the third season has a rating of 98%, based on 47 reviews, with an average rating of 8.35/10. The site's critical consensus reads, "Charming and curious as ever, The Good Place remains a delightfully insightful bright spot on the television landscape." On Metacritic, the third season has a score of 96 out of 100, based on reviews from five critics, indicating "universal acclaim".

On Rotten Tomatoes, the fourth season has a rating of 100%, based on 53 reviews, with an average rating of 8.3/10. The site's critical consensus reads, "A wild philosophical ride to the very end, The Good Place brings it home with a forking good final season."

Several critics have commended the show for its exploration and creative use of ethics and philosophy. Featured topics include the trolley problem thought experiment originally devised by Philippa Foot, the categorical imperative first formulated by Immanuel Kant, T. M. Scanlon's What We Owe to Each Other, and the works of Aristotle and Søren Kierkegaard. Andrew P. Street of The Guardian wrote that "moral philosophy is the beating heart of the program" and that the show "made philosophy seem cool." Elizabeth Yuko of The Atlantic noted that "The Good Place stands out for dramatizing actual ethics classes onscreen, without watering down the concepts being described, and while still managing to be entertaining." For their part, several philosophers have celebrated the show's largely accurate popularization of their line of work, while noting some minor inaccuracies.

Several critics have noted that The Good Place often eschews antiheroes and cynical themes in favor of likable characters and positive messages. James Poniewozik of The New York Times said, "The most refreshing thing about The Good Place, in an era of artistic bleakness, is its optimism about human nature. It's made humane and sidesplittingly entertaining television out of the notion that people – and even the occasional immortal demon – are redeemable." Jenna Scherer of Rolling Stone wrote that The Good Place proved that "slapstick and banter can coexist alongside tragedy and hardship – that a show doesn't need to be self-serious to be serious-minded." Erik Adams of The A.V. Club praised the show as portraying an "uncommonly decent TV world". Stuart Heritage of The Guardian called The Good Place "relentlessly optimistic", a quality which Stephanie Palumbo of Vulture called "a salve for despair in the Trump era".

In 2019, The Good Place was ranked 69th on The Guardian's list of the 100 best TV shows of the 21st century. In 2026, the series was ranked 51st on The New York Times' same list.

==== Critics' top-ten lists ====
Publication	Rank		
Publication	2016	2017	2018
Adweek	—N/a	—N/a	7
American Film Institute	—N/a	Shortlisted	—N/a
Ars Technica	—N/a	—N/a	Shortlisted
BuddyTV	—N/a	7	—N/a
Complex	—N/a	6	4
Consequence of Sound	—N/a	—N/a	6
Decider	—N/a	—N/a	2
E!	—N/a	8	Shortlisted
Entertainment Weekly	8	4	—N/a
Esquire	—N/a	4	—N/a
Film School Rejects	—N/a	6	6
Flood Magazine	—N/a	9	5
GameSpot	—N/a	8	Shortlisted
Glamour	—N/a	—N/a	Shortlisted
GQ	—N/a	—N/a	Shortlisted
HuffPost	—N/a	Shortlisted	—N/a
IGN	—N/a	—N/a	Shortlisted
io9	—N/a	—N/a	Shortlisted
Junkee	—N/a	—N/a	10
Las Vegas Weekly	4	5	—N/a
Lincoln Journal Star	5	8	—N/a
Los Angeles Times	Shortlisted	—N/a	—N/a
Metro	—N/a	Shortlisted	Shortlisted
Nerdist	—N/a	—N/a	1
New York Daily News	—N/a	—N/a	4
New York Post	—N/a	7	Shortlisted
Newsday	—N/a	10	9
Now	—N/a	8	6
NPR	—N/a	Shortlisted	Shortlisted
Omaha World-Herald	10	—N/a	2
Paste	—N/a	2	5
People	9	—N/a	—N/a
Pittsburgh Post-Gazette	8	7	—N/a
Reason	10^{a}	—N/a	—N/a
Relevant	—N/a	—N/a	2
RogerEbert.com	—N/a	3	7
Rolling Stone	—N/a	4	—N/a
Salon	—N/a	Shortlisted	4^{c}
San Francisco Chronicle	7	—N/a	10
San Jose Mercury News	—N/a	8	—N/a
Screen Rant	—N/a	—N/a	2
The A.V. Club	10	1^{b}	1^{d}
The Atlantic	—N/a	Shortlisted	—N/a
The Boston Globe	—N/a	9	—N/a
The Daily Beast	—N/a	—N/a	8
The Hollywood Reporter	—N/a	9	5
The New York Times	—N/a	Shortlisted	—N/a
The Philadelphia Inquirer	—N/a	—N/a	Shortlisted
The Plain Dealer	—N/a	9	9
The Ringer	—N/a	9	—N/a
The Salt Lake Tribune	—N/a	6	6
The Village Voice	9	6	—N/a
Thrillist	—N/a	—N/a	10
Time	—N/a	—N/a	5
Town & Country	—N/a	—N/a	Shortlisted
TV Guide	7	1	3
TVLine	—N/a	9	1
Uproxx	—N/a	4	9
USA Today	—N/a	2	7
Vanity Fair	—N/a	—N/a	1
Variety	—N/a	3	—N/a
Vox	10	—N/a	—N/a
Vulture	8	4	—N/a
Weekly Alibi	—N/a	—N/a	Shortlisted
Wilmington Star-News	—N/a	2	2

1. Tied with Patria O Muerte: Cuba, Fatherland or Death
2. Appears as No. 1 on Erik Adams' and William Hughes' lists. Also listed on 13 of 17 other The A.V. Club Top Ten Lists.
3. Tied with Brooklyn Nine-Nine
4. Appears as No. 1 on Dennis Perkins' list. Also listed on 10 of 16 other The A.V. Club Top Ten Lists.

=== Accolades ===
During its airing, The Good Place received many awards and nominations. It received fourteen Primetime Emmy Award nominations during its run, including two nominations for Outstanding Comedy Series for its third and fourth seasons. It also received two Golden Globe Award nominations in 2019, including a nomination for Best Television Series – Musical or Comedy. In genre awards, the show has won four Hugo Awards for Best Dramatic Presentation, Short Form for "The Trolley Problem", "Janet(s)", "The Answer", and "Whenever You're Ready"; it has also been nominated two other times in the category. The show also received three consecutive nominations from the Saturn Awards for Best Fantasy Television Series and three nominations from the Nebula Awards for the Ray Bradbury Award, winning once for the latter. In 2017, the American Film Institute named the show as one of its top 10 television programs of the year, and in 2019, the show received a Peabody Award for its contributions to entertainment.

Several cast members have received awards for their performances on the show. Danson received three Emmy nominations for Outstanding Lead Actor in a Comedy Series for his performance as Michael. He has also been nominated for three Critics' Choice Television Awards (winning one in 2018), two Satellite Awards, and a TCA Award for his work. Bell was nominated for a Golden Globe for Best Actress in a Television Series – Musical or Comedy for her performance as Eleanor, as well as one Critics' Choice Television Award, two People's Choice Awards (winning one in 2019), one Teen Choice Award, and one TCA Award. Maya Rudolph has received three Emmy nominations for Outstanding Guest Actress in a Comedy Series, and Harper, Jamil, Carden, and Adam Scott have all received nominations for awards for their work on the show.

== Philosophical inspirations ==
The Good Place makes use of many different theories of moral philosophy and ethics through the character of Chidi Anagonye, the moral philosophy professor. The main ethical frameworks that the series focuses on are utilitarianism, deontology, and virtue ethics. Within the show, there is reference to John Locke, Tim Scanlon, Peter Singer, and Derek Parfit, and "the show has covered everything from Jonathan Dancy's theory of moral particularism, to Aristotelian virtue ethics, to Kantian deontology, to moral nihilism." UCLA philosophy professor Pamela Hieronymi and Clemson philosophy professor Todd May served as consultants to the show. They both made cameo appearances in the final episode.

The beginning of The Good Place takes its inspiration from the idiom "Hell is other people" from Jean-Paul Sartre's play No Exit. In the play three people are trapped in Hell, represented as one room, and they torture one another psychologically while reflecting upon the sins that got them there. The concept "Hell is other people" is an often-misunderstood philosophical idiom meant to reflect that "Hell is other people because you are, in some sense, forever trapped within them, subject to their apprehension of you."

The second season's philosophy is most closely related to that of Aristotle, with Schur in particular highlighting Aristotle's "practice-makes-perfect" attitude to acting ethically. Chidi's impenetrable 4,000-page ethical treatise was inspired by Parfit's On What Matters – which attempts "to propose a grand unified theory of all ethical theories". Schur was unable to finish reading due to its length. Tim Scanlon's What We Owe to Each Other "forms the spine of the entire show" according to Schur. The book presents the idea of contractualism: the idea is that "to act morally is to abide by principles that no one could reasonably reject". The show and the relationships between the characters act as an investigation into contractualism with the four main humans, Michael, and Janet forming their own society whereby they must act in ways that no one could reasonably reject even when that goes against the rules and tenets of higher powers. The overarching thesis of the show, greatly influenced by the contractualist theory, is "the point of morality ... isn't to accumulate goodness points, as in the elaborate point system the organizers of the Good Place and its corresponding Bad Place employ to determine who goes to which upon death. It's to live up to our duties to each other." This additionally acts as a guide for the characters to reflect on the motivation behind their past, present, and future actions. For example, Eleanor juggles with this heavily in the first season as she becomes more aware of why she makes certain choices and ends up asking herself: is this out of self-interest or is it truly the right decision? This internal conflict is shown in her attempts to improve her actions and thoughts under the guidance of Chidi Anagonye, as his philosophical theories provide helpful feedback. As the series continues, each of the main characters undergoes their own moral development by facing their flaws and rethinking their previous values. As a result, each of the characters starts to learn more about themselves and their personal ethics, leading to their betterment.

== The Selection ==
In September 2019, prior to the release of the fourth season of The Good Place, NBC released a six-episode web series on their website, app, and their YouTube channel, titled The Selection (full title: The Good Place Presents: The Selection), directed by Eric Kissack. The series, set during an ellipsis taking place during the season 3 episode 11: "Chidi Sees the Time-Knife", follows Michael's former demon boss Shawn as he and his underlings decide which four people to pick for Michael's new incarnation of "the Good Place". Marc Evan Jackson, Josh Siegal, Bambadjan Bamba, Amy Okuda, and Jama Williamson form the main cast by reprising their roles from The Good Place as Shawn and his underlings, with Joe Mande reprising his role as Toddrick "Todd" Hemple in the third episode. At the 72nd Primetime Emmy Awards, the series was nominated for Outstanding Short Form Comedy or Drama Series.

== See also ==
- "A Nice Place to Visit" – episode of The Twilight Zone with a similar premise and plot twist
