= Everything Is Fine (The Good Place) =

- The Good Place episode
- Episode no.: Season 1 Episode 1
- Directed by: Drew Goddard
- Written by: Michael Schur
- Original air date: September 19, 2016
- Running time: 24 minutes

Guest appearances
- Bambadjan Bamba as Bambadjan; Seth Morris as Wallace; Jill Remez as Gloria; Ruman Kazi as Sachveer; John Hartman as Joe; Jamila Webb as Good Woman

Episode chronology
← Previous —	Next → "Flying"
- The Good Place season 1

"Everything Is Fine" is the series premiere of the American fantasy-comedy television series The Good Place. Written by series creator Michael Schur and directed by executive producer Drew Goddard, it aired on NBC in the United States on September 19, 2016, back-to-back with the second episode "Flying".

The series focuses on Eleanor Shellstrop (Kristen Bell), a woman who wakes up in the afterlife and is introduced by Michael (Ted Danson) to "The Good Place", a Heaven-like utopia he designed, in reward for her righteous life. Eleanor, an amoral loner, concludes that she was sent to the Good Place by mistake, and must then hide her morally imperfect behavior and try to become a better person.

In August 2015, the show was given a 13-episode straight-to-series order by NBC. Casting took place at the start of 2016, and the series was mainly filmed at The Huntington and Universal Studios Hollywood. In its original broadcast, the episode was viewed by 8.04 million viewers, becoming the most-watched comedy series premiere of the 2016–2017 television season. Critics praised the writing and Bell's and Danson's performances.

== Plot ==
Eleanor Shellstrop (Kristen Bell) opens her eyes and finds herself in a waiting room. She is greeted by Michael (Ted Danson), who informs her she has died on Earth after a line of shopping carts caused her to fall into open traffic. Congratulating her, Michael tells Eleanor she was one of the best people on Earth, and that as a result, she has entered "The Good Place", a Heaven-like utopia.

Soon after, Michael gives Eleanor a tour of the Good Place before screening an informational video for her and other newcomers. In the video, Michael explains that their actions on Earth gave them positive or negative points which were tallied up after they died; the people with the highest scores entered the Good Place. Michael also explains that every person has a soulmate, before telling Eleanor she earned her spot in the Good Place as a lawyer defending people on death row.

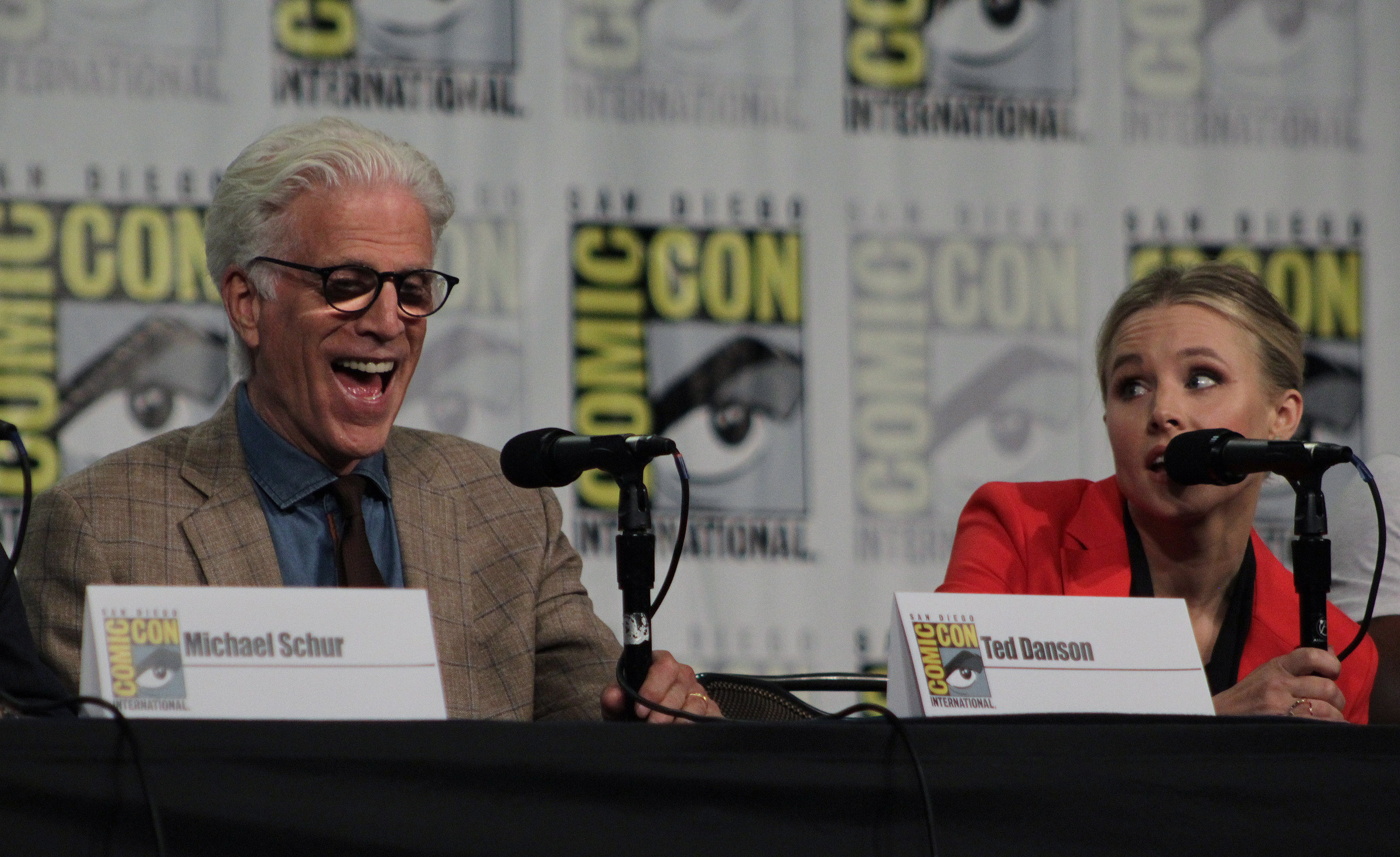
Ted Danson and Kristen Bell, who respectively portray Michael and Eleanor in The Good Place

After presenting Eleanor with a house designed specifically for her preferences, Michael introduces her to her soulmate, Chidi Anagonye (William Jackson Harper), a Senegalese ethics professor. When Michael leaves, Eleanor reveals to Chidi that everything Michael said about her life is wrong and she is not the person he says she is. Eleanor explains how she made a living by knowingly selling a worthless dietary supplement to the sick and elderly as an uncaring person, not recalling any good action she has ever done. Michael then introduces Eleanor and Chidi to their neighbors, Tahani Al-Jamil (Jameela Jamil), a wealthy English philanthropist, and her soulmate Jianyu Li (Manny Jacinto), a Buddhist monk who has decided to keep his vow of silence.

While attending a party hosted by Tahani and Jianyu at their mansion, Chidi begins to question whether or not to help Eleanor after she becomes drunk and insults Tahani. The next morning, Eleanor wakes up to discover that many things that represent her crass comments about her life and her insults to Tahani at the party are wreaking havoc on the Good Place. Chidi tells her that remaining in the Good Place is cause for the incident and her actions are affecting it. Eleanor then asks Chidi to help her become a better person just as Michael knocks on the door to inform them of an emergency meeting.

== Production ==
=== Development ===
On August 13, 2015, NBC issued a press release announcing it had given the then-untitled show from Michael Schur a 13-episode order. In his pitch, Schur told the network the basic premise of the series, but concealed information about the twist in the first season's finale. In January 2016, it was announced Drew Goddard was going to direct the first episode. Goddard, a fan of Schur's previous work, said he received an invitation from the creator to simply talk, before finding out that Schur was going to pitch him an idea. After finally reading the screenplay to the premiere, Goddard told Collider he got on board to direct because "you just pick the people you believe in and you ride towards the same goal, and I knew that Mike was one of those people."

"So, I did a bunch of reading on my own [...] before anybody got anywhere close to meeting in a room. I was like, 'I have thousands of gaps big and small in my education about this stuff, and I just need to plug them as quickly as possible.' I had a big document and as I would make notes to myself, I would keep seeing the same names come up over and over again, and I would go, 'Okay, well this seems like the thing I need to read that's a little more specific about this area.'"

— Michael Schur on creating The Good Place

According to Schur, the premise and idea was to include religious elements into the series after doing research on various faiths and groups, but he decided to scrap the plans, instead going for a concept that included all faiths, diverse and free of religious views. On the topic, Schur said he "stopped doing research because I realized it's about versions of ethical behavior, not religious salvation. The show isn't taking a side, the people who are there are from every country and religion." Schur also pointed out that the setting (shot in California's The Huntington and Universal Studios Hollywood) "had the feeling of a pastiche of different cultures", stating that the neighborhoods would feature people who were part of nondenominational and interdenominational backgrounds that interact with each other regardless of religion.

The series' setting and premises, as well as the serialized cliffhangers, were modeled on Lost, a favorite series of Schur. One of the first people he called when he developed the series was Lost co-creator Damon Lindelof. In an interview, he remarked, "I took him to lunch and said, 'We're going to play a game [of] 'Is this anything?'" He then added, "I imagine this going in the Lost way, with cliffhangers and future storylines." His discussions with Lindelof were a key factor in why he "didn't pitch [the show] to NBC until [he] had the whole idea, because of hearing [Lindelof] talk about the process of writing a show that has these qualities and how hard it can be." Instead, he planned out the season and where "the big tentpole episodes" would go; this plan would deviate little during production of the first season.

=== Casting ===
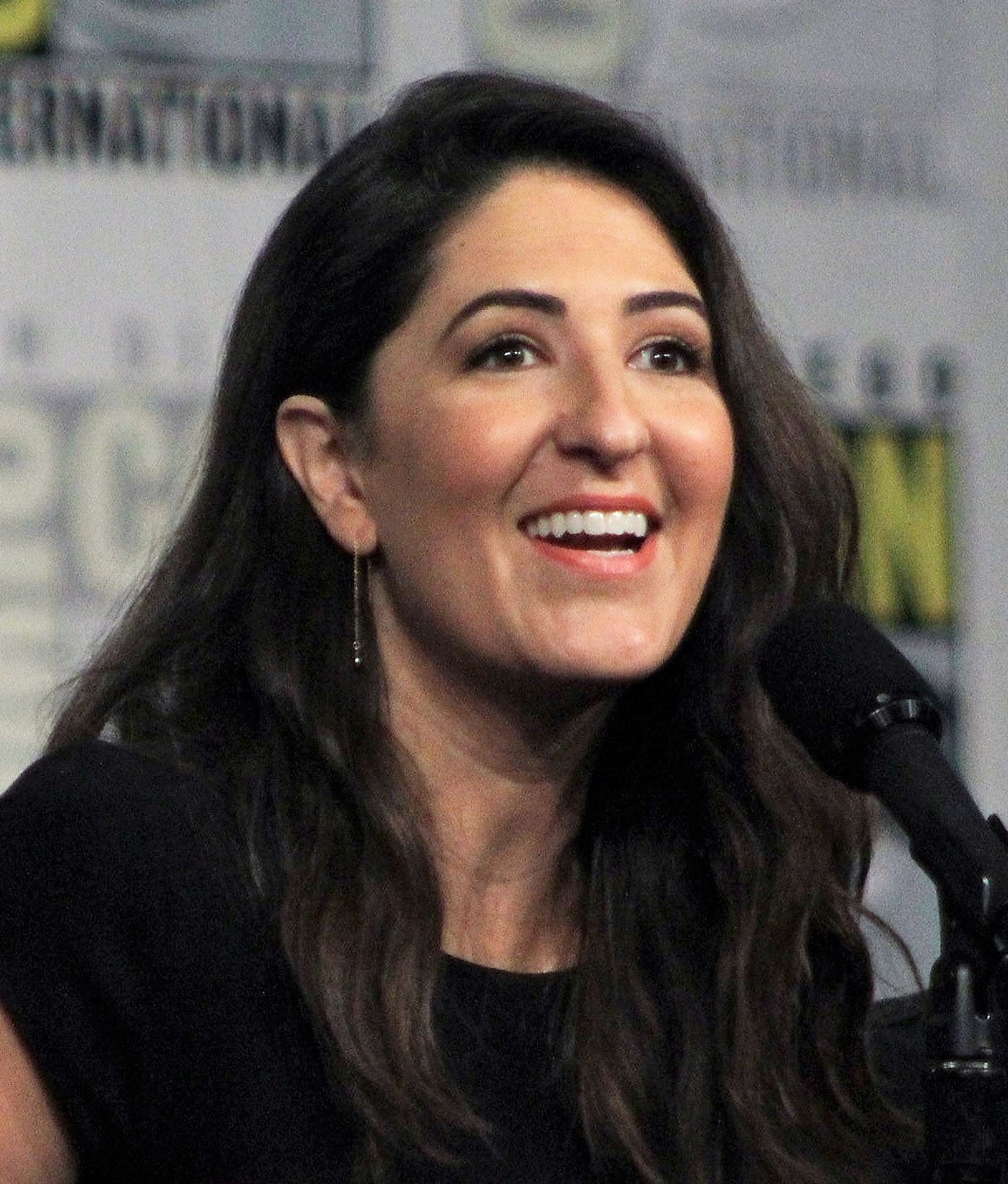
Writers on the show purposely gave false information on the casting of D'Arcy Carden as Janet.

On January 12, 2016, NBC announced that Kristen Bell and Ted Danson had been cast in the lead roles for the series. The first synopsis was also released, stating that the show was set to revolve around Eleanor designing her own self-improvement course, with Michael acting as her guide. William Jackson Harper was cast as "Chris" on February 11, 2016, though the character's real name was later revealed to be Chidi. In an interview with GQ, Harper said his audition revolved around his character helping Bell's character after finding out she wasn't working in "The Innocence Project", a workspace where the pair had become friends. On that premise, he said "it was a completely different scenario, but the bones of Chidi were essentially there". After he got the part, he was told the real premise of the show in a meeting with Schur and Goddard.

Jameela Jamil was cast as "Tessa" on February 25, 2016, and her character was renamed Tahani. That same year, on March 3, Manny Jacinto was revealed to have been cast as a "sweet and good-natured Jason" whose "dream is to make a living as a DJ in Southern Florida". On March 14, 2016, D'Arcy Carden was cast in the final series regular role as Janet Della-Denunzio, described as "a violin salesperson with a checkered past". Though the character's actual profession is different in the show, where Janet serves as a programmed guide, she retained her original first name in the series, with it being reported in 2018 that the writers on the show purposely gave news publishers false information on her character.

== Reception ==
=== Ratings ===
In its original American broadcast on September 19, 2016, "Everything Is Fine" was seen by an estimated 8.04 million household viewers and gained a 2.3/8 ratings share among adults aged 18–49, according to Nielsen Media Research. This means that it was seen by 2.3 percent of all households with television, and 8 percent of all households watching television at the time. The Good Place was the second most-watched show on NBC for the night (behind The Voice), first in its timeslot and fourth for the night in the 18–49 demographics, behind Kevin Can Wait, The Voice, and The Big Bang Theory. After several days, viewing of the episode from DVRs increased the episode's audience reception across the United States to around 12 million people, making it the most-watched comedy series premiere of the 2016–17 United States network television season.

=== Critical reception ===
Overall, the episode received generally positive reviews from critics. In a review from an advance screening at San Diego Comic-Con, Matt Fowler of IGN gave the episode a 7.2 out of 10. He described the show as "a whimsically bureaucratic look at the afterlife" that could "stand on its own as a slice of unique, fun TV". He noted that Bell and Danson "delight" but "the rest of the ensemble needs work". Dennis Perkins of The A.V. Club gave the premiere and the following episode, "Flying", an A−. He praised Schur's version of the afterlife, remarking that "the good place's rules and eccentricities [are] fairly bursting with comic ingenuity and fiddly little bits of weirdness that promise a renewable supply of laughs and interest." He also called Bell "the perfect choice for Eleanor, as her innate brightness keeps us rooting for Eleanor to brazen her way through her mistaken admittance to paradise." In another review of the first two episodes, Noel Murray of Vulture gave 4 out of 5 stars, calling the show "clever, funny, and pleasantly familiar". He remarked, "Teasing a few mysteries is always a strong way to launch a series, though The Good Place doesn't dwell on them at the expense of telling good jokes."
