= Joe Mande =

American screenwriter

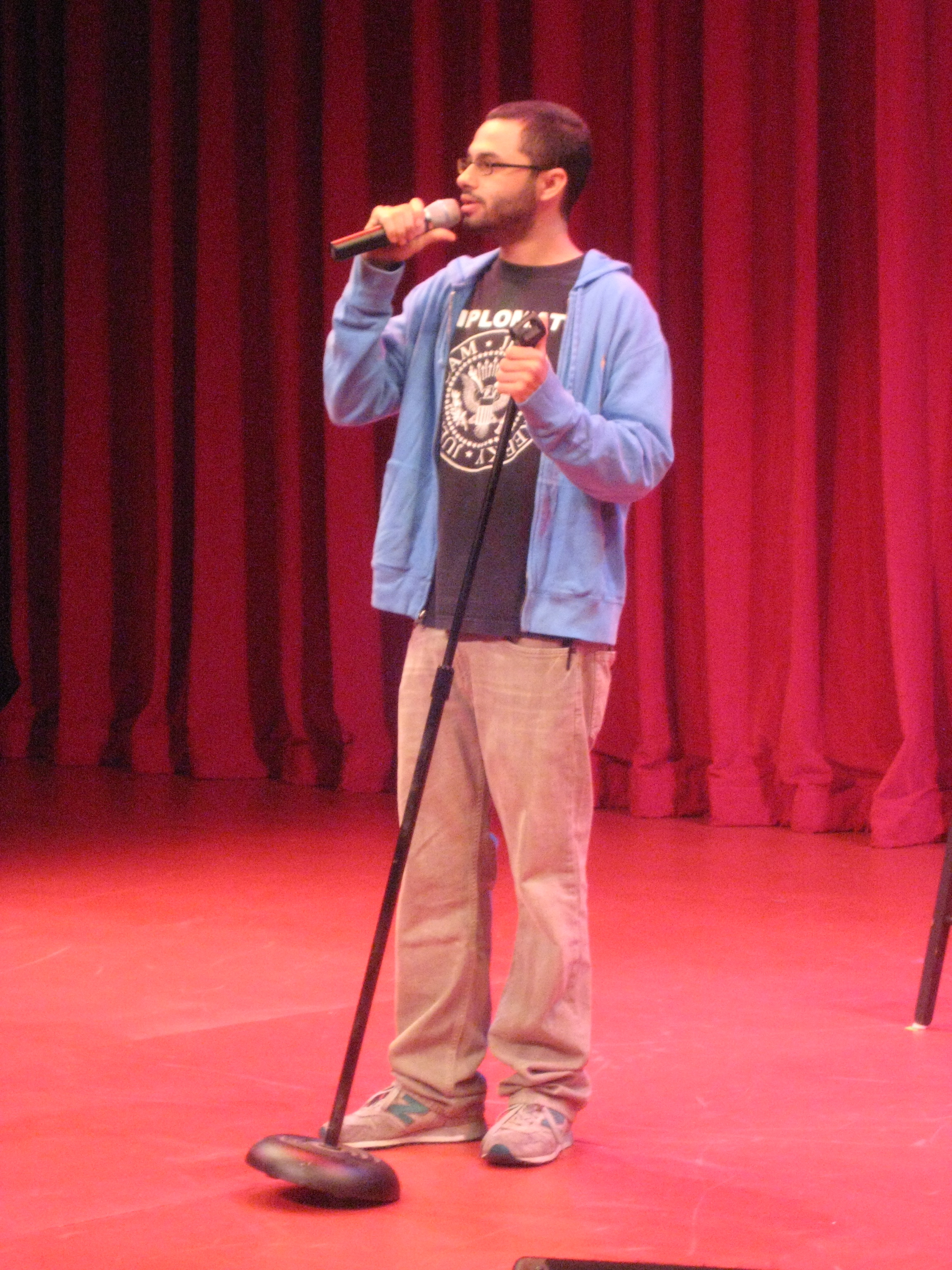
- Mande performing at Bumbershoot in 2009
- Born: Joseph Mande; March 16, 1983 (age 43); Albuquerque, New Mexico, U.S.
- Education: Emerson College
- Spouse: Kylie Augustine (m. 2015)

Comedy career
- Years active: 2005–present
- Medium: Stand up; television; internet
- Website: joemande.com

Joseph Mande (born March 16, 1983) is an American comedian, actor and screenwriter. He has received various accolades including a Primetime Emmy Award, a Producers Guild of America Award and three Writers Guild of America Awards.

As an actor, Mande had recurring roles as Morris Lerpiss in the NBC sitcom Parks and Recreation from 2012 to 2015, Ben in the ABC sitcom Modern Family from 2015 to 2018 and Ray on the HBO Max comedy series Hacks from 2021 to 2022. He is also known as a writer and producer earning the Primetime Emmy Award for Outstanding Comedy Series for Hacks at the 76th Primetime Emmy Awards.

Mande released a comedy album Bitchface (2014) and a Netflix comedy special Joe Mande's Award-Winning Comedy Special (2017).

== Early life and education ==
Mande was born in Albuquerque, New Mexico to Louis Mande, a lawyer, and Deborah Mande, a judge. He moved to St. Paul, Minnesota at the age of ten and graduated from Central High School in 2001. He attended Emerson College in Boston where he received a BFA in writing.

== Career ==
In his early career, Joe Mande created the website "Look at this Fucking Hipster" in April 2009 as a way to help his dad answer the question, "Is that a hipster?" He turned it into a book entitled, Look at This F*cking Hipster.

Mande has appeared on such TV shows as Comedy Central's The Half Hour, VH1's Best Week Ever and Conan.

Mande was a writer for the final three seasons of the NBC sitcom Parks and Recreation, also appearing in seven episodes as Pawnee resident Morris Lerpiss. He has also written for the Comedy Central sketch series Kroll Show, and the Adult Swim series Delocated. He was a producer for the first season of Aziz Ansari's Netflix series Master of None and played Todd in James Franco's film The Disaster Artist. He also wrote for the NBC sitcom The Good Place, created by Parks and Recreation co-creator Mike Schur.

Mande released his first comedy album, Bitchface, on March 14, 2014. The album is in the style of a mixtape with voicemail messages from Fabolous, Roy Hibbert, Jenny Slate, Nick Kroll, Aziz Ansari, The RZA and Amy Poehler. In 2017, Mande released a Netflix comedy special called Joe Mande's Award Winning Comedy Special. Mande was a co-executive producer/consulting producer from 2021 to 2024 for the Max series Hacks. He wrote multiple episodes.

== Personal life ==
Mande married Kylie Augustine in 2015.

Prior to posting a note on his Twitter account stating that he would no longer use it, Mande was most known for using Twitter to troll famous people and businesses. He claimed to have purchased many of his followers. Mande frequently made tweets about wanting to be La Croix Sparkling Water spokesperson which led to a cease-and-desist letter. In 2011, he initiated an argument with former NBA player Gilbert Arenas after the latter deleted years worth of allegedly sexist tweets. In 2017, he faced accusations of abusing his platform to promote cyberbullying after tweeting "Barron Trump will be mutilating cats on the white house lawn in like two weeks".

Mande is an avid supporter of the Minnesota Timberwolves.

== Filmography ==
=== Film ===
Year	Title	Role	Director	Notes
2014	The Interview	Joe	Seth Rogen and Evan Goldberg	
2017	The Disaster Artist	Todd	James Franco	
2025	Good Fortune	Joe	Aziz Ansari	

=== Television ===
Year	Title	Role	Notes
2012–2015	Parks and Recreation	Morris Lerpiss	7 episodes; Also Writer
2013	Money From Strangers	Himself	5 episodes
2013	Kroll Show	Elon Faizon	2 episodes; Also Writer
2014–2015	Brooklyn Nine-Nine	Isaac	Episodes: "Charges and Specs" / "The 9-8"
2015	Master of None	—N/a	Writer - Episode: "The Other Man"
2015–2018	Modern Family	Ben	12 episodes
2016	Animals.	Branch (voice)	Episode: "Pigeons."
2016	Love	Jeffrey	Episode: "Party in the Hills"
2017	Desus & Mero	Himself	Episode: S1 E145, August 14, 2017"
2017–2020	The Good Place	Toddrick Hemple (voice)	Also writer and producer
2018	Forever	—N/a	Executive producer (8 episodes) / Writer (Episode: "The Lake House")
2019	The Selection	Toddrick Hemple (voice)	Episode: "The Takeout Order" (Note: Webisode spin-off of The Good Place)
2020	Our Cartoon President	Mark Zuckerberg	2 episodes
2021–2026	Hacks	Ray	Recurring cast; also writer and producer
2025	Running Point	Dr. Haber	Episode: "A Special Place in Hell"; Also writer and producer
2025	Everybody's Live with John Mulaney	Himself	Episode: "What is On The Minds of Teens?"

=== Comedy Special ===
Year	Title	Role	Notes
2017	Joe Mande's Award-Winning Comedy Special	Himself	Netflix comedy special

== Awards and nominations ==
Organizations	Year	Category	Work	Result	Ref.
Primetime Emmy Awards	2019	Outstanding Comedy Series	The Good Place (season three)	Nominated	
Primetime Emmy Awards	2020	Outstanding Comedy Series	The Good Place (season four)	Nominated	
Primetime Emmy Awards	2021	Outstanding Comedy Series	Hacks (season one)	Nominated	
Primetime Emmy Awards	2022	Outstanding Comedy Series	Hacks (season two)	Nominated	
Primetime Emmy Awards	2024	Outstanding Comedy Series	Hacks (season three)	Won	
Producers Guild of America	2018	Best Episodic Comedy	The Good Place (season three)	Nominated	
Producers Guild of America	2021	Best Episodic Comedy	Hacks (season one)	Nominated	
Producers Guild of America	2022	Best Episodic Comedy	Hacks (season two)	Nominated	
Producers Guild of America	2024	Best Episodic Comedy	Hacks (season three)	Won	
Writers Guild of America	2012	Comedy Series	Parks and Recreation	Nominated	
Writers Guild of America	2013	Comedy Series	Parks and Recreation	Nominated	
Writers Guild of America	2018	Comedy Series	The Good Place	Nominated	
Writers Guild of America	2021	New Series	Hacks	Won	
Writers Guild of America	2021	Comedy Series	Hacks	Won	
Writers Guild of America	2022	Comedy Series	Hacks (season two)	Nominated	
Writers Guild of America	2024	Comedy Series	Hacks (season three)	Won	

== Discography ==
- Bitchface (2014)
