= Morgan Sackett =

American director and producer

- Education: University of Iowa
- Occupations: Director, producer

Morgan Sackett is an American director and producer. He has won three Primetime Emmy Awards and been nominated for 12 more in the categories Outstanding Comedy Series, Outstanding Short Form Comedy, Drama or Variety Series and Outstanding Directing for a Comedy Series for his work on the television programs Parks and Recreation, Veep, The Good Place and Hacks.

Sackett was raised in Okoboji, Iowa. He was executive producer for the IMDb TV television series Primo along with David Miner.
