= The Good Place season 4 =

The Good Place
- Season 4
- Promotional poster
- Starring: Kristen Bell; William Jackson Harper; Jameela Jamil; D'Arcy Carden; Manny Jacinto; Ted Danson
- No. of episodes: 14

Release
- Original network: NBC
- Original release: September 26, 2019 – January 30, 2020

Season chronology
- ← Previous; Season 3

The fourth and final season of the fantasy-comedy television series The Good Place, created by Michael Schur, was ordered by NBC on December 4, 2018. The season premiered on September 26, 2019, and consisted of 14 episodes. The season is produced by Fremulon, 3 Arts Entertainment, and Universal Television.

The series focuses on Eleanor Shellstrop (Kristen Bell), a deceased young woman who wakes up in the afterlife and is welcomed by Michael (Ted Danson) to "the Good Place" in reward for her righteous life; however, she eventually discovers that Michael's "Good Place" is a hoax, and she is actually in the "Bad Place", to be psychologically and emotionally tortured by her fellow afterlife residents. Eleanor and Michael claim that "the points system" for assigning humans to the Good Place or Bad Place is fundamentally flawed; in the real world, assigning a certain action as categorically Good or Bad is practically impossible due to unintended consequences. In the fourth season, they are given a chance to prove their hypothesis. They design an experiment meant to demonstrate that humans in a simulated Good Place can show moral development. One of the experiment subjects is Eleanor's boyfriend, Chidi (William Jackson Harper), who has volunteered to have his memory erased to preserve the integrity of the experiment. Jameela Jamil, Manny Jacinto, and D'Arcy Carden also star as Eleanor and Michael's friends and collaborators in the experiment. Each of the episodes is listed as "Chapter (xx)" following the opening title card; the final episode is listed as "The Final Chapter".

== Cast ==
=== Main ===
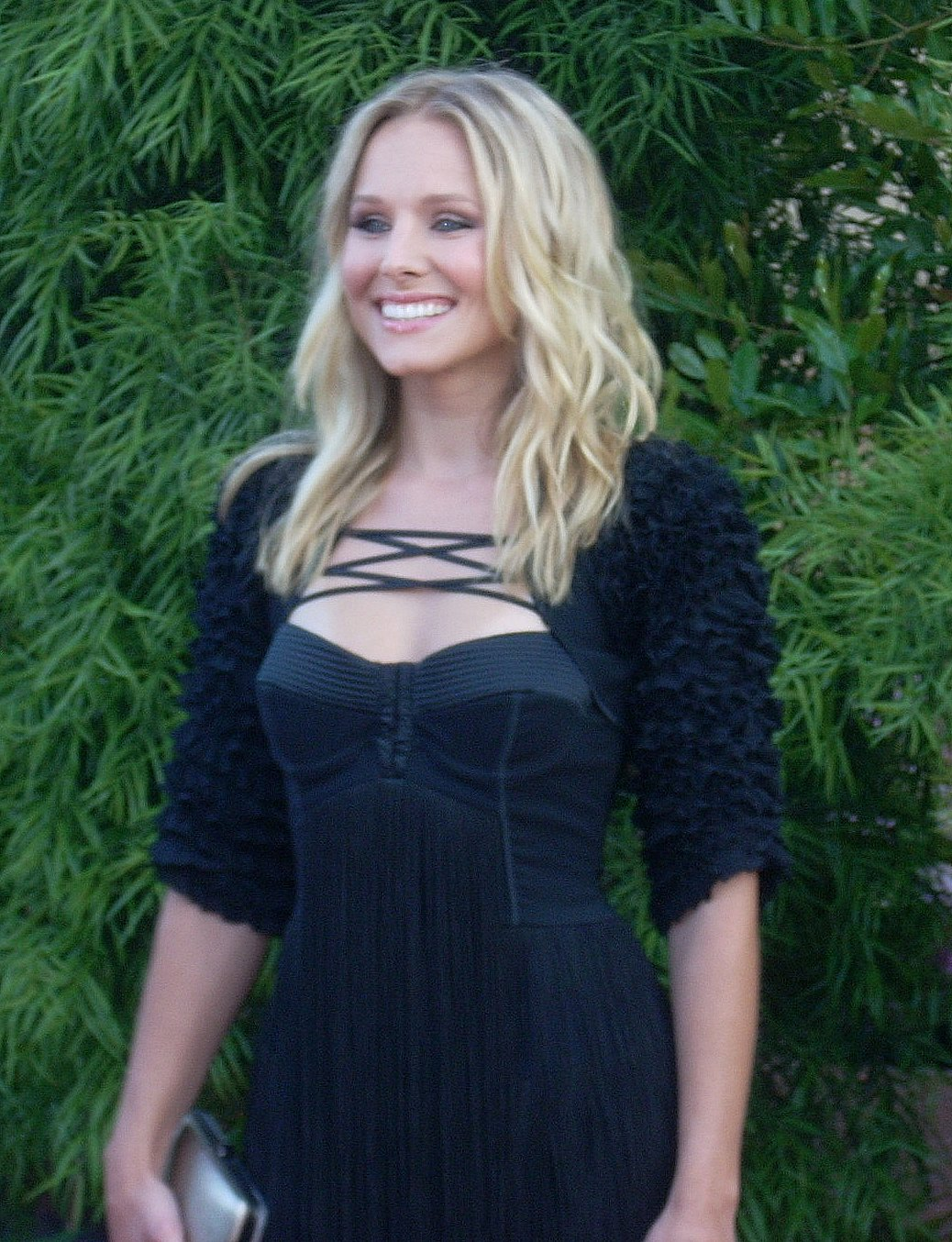
Kristen Bell portrays series protagonist Eleanor Shellstrop and directed episode eight.

- Kristen Bell as Eleanor Shellstrop, a deceased, selfish saleswoman from Phoenix, Arizona. She pretends to be the architect of the Good Place after Michael becomes overwhelmed and has a panic attack.
- William Jackson Harper as Chidi Anagonye, a deceased professor of ethics and moral philosophy from Senegal. After having his memories of the afterlife erased, Chidi serves as one of the human participants in the team's experiment.
- Jameela Jamil as Tahani Al-Jamil, a deceased, wealthy English philanthropist who believes she belongs in the Good Place. She forms an unlikely friendship with Eleanor, who initially dislikes her positive attitude, condescending way of speaking, and tendency to name drop.
- D'Arcy Carden as Janet, a programmed guide and knowledge bank who acts as the Good Place's main source of information and can provide its residents with whatever they desire. Later, Janet gains a more humanlike disposition, and begins to act differently from the way she was designed. Carden also plays various other versions of Janet, most prominently:
  - Bad Janet, a disrespectful version designed not to respond to residents properly. She pretended to be Good Janet after the real Good Janet was kidnapped until Jason saw through the deception. She is released by Michael and is given a manifesto about the experiment.
  - Neutral Janet, an emotionless Janet who works in the neutral zone between the Good Place and the Bad Place.
  - Disco Janet. According to Michael, she was "fun, but a lot".
- Manny Jacinto as Jason Mendoza, a deceased amateur DJ and drug dealer from Jacksonville, Florida who winds up in the Good Place by mistake. He is introduced as Jianyu Li, a Taiwanese monk who took a vow of silence. Later, Jason proves to be an immature and unintelligent, but kindhearted Jacksonville Jaguars and Blake Bortles fan.
- Ted Danson as Michael, an architect who runs the Good Place neighborhood in which Eleanor, Chidi, Tahani, and Jason reside. Michael has a deep affinity for the mundane aspects of human life, like playing with paper clips or searching for one's car keys. "Michael" is a Hebrew name meaning "who is like God?"

=== Recurring ===
- Marc Evan Jackson as Shawn, Michael's wicked boss. Shawn gives Michael two chances to pull off the torture experiment, and later turns against him when he finds out about Michael's betrayal.
- Maya Rudolph as the eternal Judge who rules on interdimensional matters between the Good Place and the Bad Place.
- Kirby Howell-Baptiste as Simone Garnett, an Australian neuroscientist and, briefly, Chidi's girlfriend. She dies and becomes the experimental Good Place's second test subject, complicating the test and causing the erasure of Chidi's memories. When she arrives, she is in complete denial of her surroundings, believing them to be hallucinations of her dying brain.
- Tiya Sircar as Vicky, a Bad Place demon who is introduced as the "real Eleanor Shellstrop" in the first attempt of Michael's torture plan. Though Shawn subsequently encased her in a cocoon as a punishment, she was shown at the end of the third season and beginning of the fourth season to be wearing a body suit which made her identical in appearance to Michael. Shawn created the suit to enable the demons to torment the four humans upon the seemingly inevitable failure of the new experiment. She is later exploded into goo while posing as Michael during a ceremony to celebrate the skinsuits, but is brought back to redeem herself for a new experiment. Vicky later becomes in charge of the rehabilitation Bad Place.
- Maribeth Monroe as Mindy St. Claire, a deceased corporate lawyer and cocaine addict who just barely toed the line of earning enough Good Place points before her death and thus was awarded her own private Medium Place. When Derek was sent to her during the second season, she rebooted him repeatedly, which made him smarter, more sophisticated and refined.
- Jason Mantzoukas as Derek, a wacky artificial rebound boyfriend created by Janet who was later sent to Mindy St. Claire. Through subsequent and repeated reboots, he is shown to be evolved in his capacities, intelligence, and refinement.
- Luke Guldan as Chris, a muscular Bad Place demon who is sent by Shawn to thwart Michael's experiment by posing as Linda Johansen (Rachel Winfree), a sweet, but boring, old lady from Norway.
- Brandon Scott Jones as John Wheaton, the first test subject sent to the experimental Good Place. In life, he was a gossip columnist, and especially published trashy articles about Tahani.
- Benjamin Koldyke as Brent Norwalk, the fourth test subject sent to the experimental Good Place, a privileged and entitled chauvinist.
- Jama Williamson as Val, Shawn's secretary.
- Bambadjan Bamba as Bambadjan, an underling for the Bad Place.
- Josh Siegal as Glenn, an underling for the Bad Place, who later became a traitor after realizing how good humans are. He is exploded into goo by Bad Janet (who was posing as Good Janet).
- Brad Morris as Matt, a suicidal accountant who works in a neutral office between the Good Place and the Bad Place. He is assigned as the accountant for Eleanor and Michael's experiment.
- Joe Mande as the voice of Toddrick Hemple, a lava monster who refuses to wear a human suit.
- Paul Scheer as Chuck, a member of the Good Place committee.

=== Guest ===
- Mike O'Malley as Jeff, the gatekeeper of the doorway between the afterlife and Earth. He has an affinity for frogs.
- Timothy Olyphant as himself, dressed as his Justified character Raylan Givens, who is conjured up by Janet for the Judge.
- Lisa Kudrow as Hypatia / "Patty", one of the residents of the Good Place.
- Nick Offerman as himself, teaching Tahani woodworking.
- Mary Steenburgen as Michael's guitar teacher. Steenburgen is also the real-life wife of Ted Danson, who plays Michael.
- Pamela Hieronymi as herself, attending a philosophy class held by Chidi. Hieronymi was also a philosophical advisor to the show.
- Todd May as himself, attending a philosophy class held by Chidi. May was also a philosophical advisor to the show.
- Mitch Narito as Donkey Doug, Jason's dopey father.
- Eugene Cordero as Steven "Pillboi" Peleaz, Jason's best friend and partner in crime.
- Angela Trimbur as Madison, Eleanor's roommate.
- Meryl Hathaway as Brittany, Eleanor's roommate.

== Episodes ==
Season 4 episodes
No. overall	No. in season	Title	Directed by	Written by	Original release date	Prod. code	U.S. viewers (millions)
40	1	"A Girl from Arizona" (Part 1)	Drew Goddard	Andrew Law & Kassia Miller	September 26, 2019	401	2.42
Eleanor starts welcoming the humans into the Good Place, while trying to understand why The Bad Place chose them. Brent, an entitled male chauvinist, treats Janet as a personal assistant; Linda, an old woman, seems to be uninterested in anything; and Simone believes that the Good Place is just a vivid hallucination created by her dying brain. Derek challenges Jason for Janet's love; Jason, desperate, activates Derek's kill-switch. Linda is revealed to be the demon Chris in disguise, who is returned to the Bad Place. To punish the Bad Place for tampering with the experiment, the Judge makes Chidi the fourth and final human for their test.
41	2	"A Girl from Arizona" (Part 2)	Drew Goddard	Andrew Law & Kassia Miller	October 3, 2019	402	2.11
Brent's struggles only convince him that he belongs in the "Best Place"; this causes Eleanor to doubt herself, and her friends question her leadership. Eleanor believes she is a mediocre human, incapable of saving humanity; her stress reaches a breaking point, and she angrily resigns as leader of the Soul Squad. Michael reminds Eleanor that she outsmarted him 800 times, and tells her that only a human can understand other humans. Eleanor bounces back and institutes a new plan: they will trick Brent into doing good deeds so he can get into the "Best Place", and tell Chidi that Simone is his soulmate so he can help her accept she is in the afterlife. Meanwhile, Jason tries to correct his behavior to impress Janet, but she decides to break up with him for the duration of the experiment so their relationship will not interfere with her maintenance of the neighborhood.
42	3	"Chillaxing"	Anya Adams	Aisha Muharrar	October 10, 2019	403	1.92
Chidi is too relaxed to focus his energy towards helping the other humans, so Eleanor and Michael decide to torture him: Jason will admit to Chidi that he is not Jianyu Li and does not belong in the Good Place, and ask him not to tell the other residents. Chidi agrees, and this moral dilemma induces stress and pain. Eleanor becomes obsessed with torturing Chidi, and terrorizes him to the point where he believes the universe is punishing him. When Chidi confesses this fear to Eleanor, she breaks down in tears, realizing she has taken the torture too far. Eleanor admits to Michael that, although she knows it to be irrational, she is angry at Chidi for leaving her. Chidi relieves his angst by deciding to teach Jason ethics. Janet helps Tahani recreate elite VIP experiences for John, but Tahani cannot convince him to study ethics. Tahani finally finds common ground with John when she realizes they both felt alone and isolated, independent of which side of "the velvet rope" they were on, and he apologizes for his hurtful posts.
43	4	"Tinker, Tailor, Demon, Spy"	Morgan Sackett	Cord Jefferson	October 17, 2019	404	2.02
A game of Pictionary is cut short when Janet brings Chidi's horrifyingly bad drawing of a horse to life. Later, Eleanor finds Chidi practicing drawing to avoid causing further harm. Glenn, a Bad Place demon, arrives in the neighborhood, claiming that Michael is really the demon Vicky in disguise. The humans' trust in Michael deteriorates after he admits to several recent lies. Janet's "demon lie detector" causes Glenn to explode into blue goo; he will take months to reconstitute. Michael is unwilling to let his friends see his true form, a monstrous fire squid. Eleanor decides to turn the matter over to the judge, who will reset the experiment. With no other way to prove his identity, Michael prepares to blow himself up to protect the experiment. Just before Michael blows himself up, Jason realizes Janet is an impostor and restrains her; she is a Bad Janet who switched places with Janet while Chris was being returned to the Bad Place, and has been sabotaging the experiment. Eleanor accepts Michael's selflessness as proof of his identity. Michael and Jason travel to the Bad Place to rescue Janet, leaving Eleanor and Tahani to manage the experiment.
44	5	"Employee of the Bearimy"	Beth McCarthy-Miller	Joe Mande	October 24, 2019	405	1.91
Without Janet, Derek is unable to manage the neighborhood effectively, and he quickly becomes overwhelmed. The simulated humans start behaving bizarrely, so Eleanor assigns Tahani to entertain the actual humans at an isolated lake house. Chidi prefers to stay at home and read, but Eleanor convinces him to try new experiences, including joining the others at the lake. Tahani frets that throwing parties is her only skill; Eleanor counters that she and Tahani are both products of their upbringing, and right now Tahani's shepherding of the humans' social relationships is literally the most important thing in the universe. Derek's control over the neighborhood improves after he reboots himself. Having already fully restored Eleanor and Tahani's memories from the many reboots, Michael returns all of Jason's memories as well, but is dismayed when he still has no good ideas for infiltrating the Bad Place. In a convention in the Bad Place, Michael and Jason pose as a costumed Vicky and Glenn and disrupt Shawn's presentation, which bemoans that humans are becoming desensitized towards torture. Although Shawn assumes they arrived as part of the presentation and allow them to take Janet, the real Vicky arrives in a Michael suit and reveals their ruse. In an emotional speech, Michael declares that humans are capable of change, and implores the spectating demons to attempt the same. After Michael and Jason rescue the real Janet, the three of them escape back to the experimental neighborhood.
45	6	"A Chip Driver Mystery"	Steve Day	Lizzy Pace	October 31, 2019	406	2.21
Six months later, Michael relates recent events to Bad Janet, who has been held captive since she was discovered. The experiment shows promise when the humans enjoy a ski trip together, with Brent expressing greater tolerance. However, their relationships are thrown into turmoil after Brent writes an amateurish novel featuring characters based on insulting caricatures of Tahani and Chidi. Michael counsels Brent that mistakes are opportunities for improvement, but Brent refuses to apologize and he and Chidi come to blows. Meanwhile, John discovers Jason's identity and struggles to keep the secret. Michael tells Bad Janet that Eleanor is forging ahead with plans to ease the humans back into healthy interactions, and explains that the desire to improve is what Michael considers proof of humanity's worth. Michael releases Bad Janet and gives her a copy of his and Janet's manifesto on humans.
46	7	"Help Is Other People"	Beth McCarthy-Miller	Dave King	November 7, 2019	407	1.98
On the last day of the year-long experiment, Simone comes close to deducing the true nature of the neighborhood as an experimental environment in which she and her acquaintances are being studied. Everyone reveals their secrets: Jason's identity, Brent's "Best Place" objective, and Chidi having been told Simone is his soulmate. Simone and Chidi discover the scoreboard identifying them, Brent, and John as test subjects. In a last-ditch effort to earn the humans points, Michael allows Brent to fall into a sinkhole, hoping the other three will unite and rescue him despite his flaws. However, only Chidi attempts to save Brent; John and Simone decide Brent is not worth saving, and flee the neighborhood. Chidi declares that he believes that they are in the Bad Place; in a final gamble to shock Brent into re-evaluating himself, Eleanor and Michael pretend that this is true, and inform them they will now be transferred to the "real" Bad Place. Brent still cannot accept that he is not a good person, but just as the experiment ends, he begins to apologize to Chidi.
47	8	"The Funeral to End All Funerals"	Kristen Bell	Josh Siegal & Dylan Morgan	November 14, 2019	408	2.06
Now that the experiment is over, the test subjects are held in stasis to wait for the Judge's ruling. In the meantime, Eleanor, Tahani, Jason, and Janet hold "funerals" for themselves and an unconscious Chidi, sharing what they have learned from each other. Michael and Shawn present summations to the Judge. While Simone, Chidi, and John all gained points over the course of the experiment, Brent's score dropped. However, because of his apology to Chidi, his score significantly increased in the final moments. Michael argues that this, combined with the fact that the humans' loved ones on Earth also improved, illustrates humans' potential for self-improvement. The Judge rules that the point system is flawed, but her solution is to erase all living and dead humans from existence and start over. Before the Judge can press the button to restart Earth, Janet hides it. Bad Janet reveals that she and the other Janets agree with Michael's manifesto, and an army of Janets arrives in the Judge's chamber; the Judge must search all the Janets for the hidden reset button. Eleanor asks Michael to restore Chidi's memories so that he can propose a better afterlife system.
48	9	"The Answer"	Valeria Migliassi Collins	Dan Schofield	November 21, 2019	410	2.05
Michael restores Chidi's memories, which he relives as he wakes up: during his childhood, his arguing parents reconcile after he lectures them against divorce; he becomes convinced that every question has a single correct answer, causing him to develop his indecisiveness. In adulthood, his girlfriend Alessandra breaks up with him over this obsession, and thesis advisers drop him over his lack of emotional perspective and inability to address a single meaningful question. In the afterlife, he asks his friends about their motivations: Jason acts on what he thinks is important, Tahani's confidence comes only after learning through failure, and Eleanor rejects rules if she thinks they are wrong. Just before wiping Chidi's memory, Michael admits he used the "soulmate" concept to torture Chidi, but true soulmates are people who choose to do the work of maintaining a relationship. Chidi writes something on a piece of paper, and gives it to Janet for safekeeping. When he wakes and learns of the situation, he is at peace with the idea that many answers or no answers may exist. He retrieves his note from Janet and opens it. It reads: "There is no 'answer.' But Eleanor is the answer."
49	10	"You've Changed, Man"	Rebecca Asher	Matt Murray	January 9, 2020	409	2.08
While the Judge searches the Janets, Chidi tries to devise an alternative proposal for the afterlife. Michael proposes admitting most dead humans to a Medium Place, while only exceptional outliers will go to the Good or Bad Places. Shawn rejects this offer, even after Michael and the humans offer to let Shawn torture them in exchange. Together—aided by a cameo appearance of Timothy Olyphant—they present a new vision to replicate the results of their own afterlife experiences: each dead human will be subjected to personalized tests of moral development, and will be rebooted as many times as they need until they pass the test (possibly never passing it); in each successive try, they will retain some of what they have learned in the form of a conscience. Shawn still refuses. But when Michael suggests he will give up and they will go their separate ways until humanity re-evolves, Shawn admits that torturing humans has become mundane while their battle has been enjoyable. Shawn accepts the proposal when Michael points out that their conflict has reached an ending regardless of his decision and that even the Bad Place is failing under the current system; Shawn's acceptance convinces the Judge to abandon her plan to reset Earth.
50	11	"Mondays, Am I Right?"	Rebecca Asher	Jen Statsky	January 16, 2020	411	1.93
Michael introduces the new system to the other demons, most of whom have difficulty adapting. Vicky, however, shows skill at designing new afterlife environments and teaching the other demons. Michael's pride and sense of purpose are threatened by Vicky's skill, and he attempts to exclude her from the project, until Janet and Tahani persuade him that his ego is less important than improving the afterlife. Michael allows Vicky to stage a coup against him to assume leadership of the project. Meanwhile, Eleanor is concerned that Chidi will stop loving her once he learns the details of her dissolute life on Earth. Chidi allays her fears by reading her afterlife file, but becomes concerned that he and Eleanor are too different and she will eventually grow bored with him. Jason tricks Chidi into realizing that, since Janet and Jason are also very different from each other and Chidi has faith in their relationship, he can have faith in his own relationship with Eleanor as well. Once the new afterlife system is up and running, Michael has good news: for their work in rescuing humanity from obliteration, the four humans are finally to be admitted to the Good Place for real.
51	12	"Patty"	Morgan Sackett	Megan Amram	January 23, 2020	412	2.12
The group arrives in The Good Place and attends a welcome party catered to their tastes. Meanwhile, the Good Place committee trick Michael into assuming control, and flee. Chidi meets Ancient Greek philosopher Hypatia, who reveals that an eternity of perfection leads to boredom. Without an end to their existences in sight, people have no reason to appreciate the good things The Good Place has to offer; the Good Place committee were unable to remedy this dilemma. Eleanor proposes a solution to the ennui plaguing Good Place residents: Michael creates a door that will allow people to exit the Good Place and peacefully end their existence. Knowing there is a potential end to eternity makes the residents of The Good Place appreciate being there again. The group then go to their individual homes, and Chidi and Eleanor cuddle as they watch the sun set; Chidi remarks that the Good Place is not a place at all; rather, it is "having enough time with the people you love."
52	13	"Whenever You're Ready"	Michael Schur	Michael Schur	January 30, 2020	413	2.32
53	14	"Whenever You're Ready"	Michael Schur	Michael Schur	January 30, 2020	414	2.32
As time passes, the group begin to decide to exit the Good Place and end their existences. Jason is first: he throws a farewell party and makes a necklace as a gift for Janet, though he loses the necklace as she walks him to the exit door. After reconciling with her parents, Tahani decides, instead of ending her existence, to become an afterlife architect. When Chidi decides to leave, Eleanor, fearing abandonment, tries to convince him to stay. He agrees but is unhappy; Eleanor realizes she must let him make his own decision. After Janet brings Chidi to the exit, Jason reappears; he found the necklace, and then spent eons contemplating the universe waiting for her to return. He gives it to her and follows Chidi through the door. Eleanor persuades Mindy St. Claire to leave her Medium Place and enter the new afterlife. Michael cannot use the door because he is not human; Eleanor persuades the Judge to allow him to become human and live a life on Earth. Eleanor, finally content, exits. Pieces of her soul drift down to Earth and inspire a man to return a wrongly delivered letter to its intended recipient, Michael. He thanks the man and he tells him to "Take it sleazy."

=== Specials ===
An hour-long retrospective, The Paley Center Salutes The Good Place, aired on September 19, 2019, featuring interviews with cast members and series creator Michael Schur; the special received 1.25 million viewers. A special featuring the six main cast members and hosted by Seth Meyers followed the 75 minute series finale on January 30, 2020; the special received 1.93 million viewers.

== Reception ==
On Rotten Tomatoes, the fourth season has a rating of 100%, based on 25 reviews, with an average rating of 8.3/10. The site's critical consensus reads, "A wild philosophical ride to the very end, The Good Place brings it home with a forking good final season."

=== Accolades ===
At the 72nd Primetime Emmy Awards, the series received six nominations–Outstanding Comedy Series, Ted Danson for Outstanding Lead Actor in a Comedy Series, D'Arcy Carden for Outstanding Supporting Actress in a Comedy Series, William Jackson Harper for Outstanding Supporting Actor in a Comedy Series, Maya Rudolph for Outstanding Guest Actress in a Comedy Series, and Michael Schur for Outstanding Writing for a Comedy Series for the series finale "Whenever You're Ready".

"The Answer" won the 2020 Hugo Award for Best Dramatic Presentation, Short Form.

"Whenever You're Ready" won the 2021 Hugo Award for Best Dramatic Presentation, Short Form and the Ray Bradbury Nebula Award for Outstanding Drama Presentation.

== Ratings ==
Viewership and ratings per episode of The Good Place season 4
No.	Title	Air date	Rating/share (18–49)	Viewers (millions)	DVR (18–49)	DVR viewers (millions)	Total (18–49)	Total viewers (millions)
1	"A Girl from Arizona (Part 1)"	September 26, 2019	0.7/3	2.42	0.6	1.58	1.3	4.01
2	"A Girl from Arizona (Part 2)"	October 3, 2019	0.6/3	2.11	0.6	1.49	1.2	3.60
3	"Chillaxing"	October 10, 2019	0.6/3	1.92	0.6	1.43	1.2	3.36
4	"Tinker, Tailor, Demon, Spy"	October 17, 2019	0.6/3	2.02	0.7	1.55	1.3	3.57
5	"Employee of the Bearimy"	October 24, 2019	0.6/3	1.91	0.6	1.45	1.2	3.37
6	"A Chip Driver Mystery"	October 31, 2019	0.6/3	2.21	0.7	1.46	1.3	3.58
7	"Help Is Other People"	November 7, 2019	0.6/3	1.98	0.6	1.42	1.2	3.41
8	"The Funeral to End All Funerals"	November 14, 2019	0.6/3	2.06	0.6	1.44	1.2	3.51
9	"The Answer"	November 21, 2019	0.6/3	2.05	0.6	1.39	1.2	3.44
10	"You've Changed, Man"	January 9, 2020	0.6/3	2.08	0.6	1.54	1.3	3.63
11	"Mondays, Am I Right?"	January 16, 2020	0.5/3	1.93	0.6	1.45	1.1	3.38
12	"Patty"	January 23, 2020	0.6/3	2.12	0.6	1.40	1.2	3.52
13	"Whenever You're Ready"	January 30, 2020	0.7/4	2.32	0.6	1.38	1.3	3.71
