= Somewhere Else (The Good Place) =

- The Good Place episode
- Episode no.: Season 2 Episode 13
- Directed by: Michael Schur
- Written by: Michael Schur
- Original air date: February 1, 2018

Guest appearances
- Maya Rudolph as Judge; Angela Trimbur as Madison; Seth Morris as Wallace; Allyn Rachel as Betsy; Meryl Hathaway as Brittany; John Hartman as Joe; David Piggott as Frim; Ben Harris as Waiter Stenn

Episode chronology
← Previous "The Burrito"	Next → "Everything Is Bonzer!"
- The Good Place (season 2)

"Somewhere Else" is the thirteenth and final episode of the second season of the American fantasy-comedy television series The Good Place. The twenty-sixth episode of the series overall, the episode originally aired in the United States on NBC on February 1, 2018, and was written and directed by series creator Michael Schur.

"Somewhere Else" sees the four humans returned to Earth with no memories of the afterlife; Michael and Janet monitor their self-improvement over time. The episode focuses on Eleanor after her near-death experience as she seeks to treat others better. As time passes, her enthusiasm for her moral behavior fades; however, a secret visit from Michael leads her to a speech from Chidi, and she finds herself motivated again.

In its original broadcast, the episode was seen by 3.19 million viewers and received critical acclaim. While several critics noted its relative lack of humor, many praised its themes and message, as well as how The Good Place reinvented itself going into its third season. Retrospective reviews of the episode have remained positive, and it is often ranked as one of the show's best episodes.

== Plot ==
After arriving from the Bad Place, Michael (Ted Danson) explains to Judge Gen (Maya Rudolph) that the four humans have shown self-improvement in the afterlife. He argues this shows the points system tracking people's behavior on Earth is corrupt. While Michael and Gen discuss a solution privately, Janet (D'Arcy Carden) confesses her feelings for Jason (Manny Jacinto), inspiring Chidi (William Jackson Harper) to kiss Eleanor (Kristen Bell).

Michael and Gen return with a new proposal: the four humans will be placed in separate Medium Places while they work on a solution for up to a million years. Eleanor argues this would be unfair, but Gen remains convinced the humans only improved because they expected a reward. Michael believes the humans would have improved if given a push in the right direction, which gives him a new idea; Gen reluctantly agrees and resets the humans' memories.

Eleanor returns to Earth right before her death, but she is saved by an unseen person. Her brush with death inspires her to become a better person. She quits her shady pharmaceutical job, joins an environmental group, and seeks to behave more ethically throughout her life. For a time, Eleanor seems to be thriving, but becomes increasingly unhappy after confessing some previous bad deeds to her roommate, who promptly evicts her. She becomes frustrated with other people's apathy toward the environmental group and begins to lose interest in her job, finally choosing to quit so she can go to a concert with a friend instead of working.

Eleanor embraces her old lifestyle. Michael and Janet, monitoring Eleanor from the afterlife, recognize that she will likely never change without Chidi's influence, but Gen forbids them from interfering.

Michael sneaks to Earth and poses as a bartender for Eleanor. She complains about the difficulties of being ethical; he encourages her to listen to her conscience and asks her "what do we owe to each other?" Eleanor searches the question online and finds a lecture by Chidi. The lecture resonates with her, and she flies to Australia to meet Chidi in person, pleasing Michael.

== Production ==
In an interview with Rolling Stone, series creator Michael Schur stated that the decision to return the four humans to Earth was due to their progress in the afterlife being "theoretical". As he explained, "It seemed like a natural move to send them back to a time before they made that progress, and to use the idea of nearly dying to test their ability to improve."

Michael's scene as a bartender drew attention from several critics as a nod to Ted Danson's role as Sam Malone on Cheers. Danson agreed to the idea when Schur ran it past him, and Schur specifically wrote for Danson to be cutting limes and have a towel on his shoulder in the scene. Later in the episode, Chidi appears to give a speech in English; while his character originally spoke French in the real world and a version was recorded with William Jackson Harper using an accent, Schur opted to stick with Harper's normal voice to prevent confusion.

== Reception ==
=== Ratings ===
In its original broadcast on February 1, 2018, "Somewhere Else" was seen by 3.19 million American viewers and received a 1.1 rating among adults ages 18–49. The episode placed fourth in its timeslot among network broadcasts, behind Young Sheldon, Grey's Anatomy, and The Four: Battle for Stardom. After factoring in seven-day DVR viewership, the episode was seen by 4.95 million viewers and achieved a 1.9 rating in the 18–49 demographic.

=== Reviews ===
"Somewhere Else" received widespread acclaim from critics. Vanity Fair's Laura Bradley praised the episode's optimistic message and character growth. She remarked that the episode was the opposite of the first-season finale's major twist, but added that it was "just as satisfying as the first – if not more so". Darren Franich of Entertainment Weekly similarly complimented the twist and said, "It's cynical and hopeful, an attempt to reimagine all the great philosophies as a sitcom". Alan Sepinwall and Kelly Lawler each noted in their reviews for Uproxx and USA Today, respectively, that the episode was not interested in humor but felt emotionally satisfying as it laid a new foundation for the show. Sepinwall also expressed concerns about how the show would handle the twist, but he had "long since learned to trust what Schur and company are up to with this series". GQ's Scott Meslow was similarly confident in The Good Place's ability to reinvent itself as its high-concept premise became a "very human story about why it’s important to care about people".

Analyzing the episode for Vox, Caroline Framke considered two scenarios to explain the plot – that the humans had returned to Earth or that they were in another simulation – but found that either could make sense, which she found exciting. Steve Greene of IndieWire found that the finale reinforced the show's theme of faith and of doing good things with no guarantee of later recognition. Several critics drew comparisons between the episode and the final season of Lost, which also placed its characters in an alternate timeline and followed their self-improvement; Lost co-creator Damon Lindelof had advised Schur when The Good Place was being developed, and IndieWire pointed out an Easter egg for Lindelof in the episode. Other comparisons included Enlightened, The Leftovers, and the final season of The Sopranos.

In retrospective discussions, "Somewhere Else" has often been placed among the show's best episodes. In his review of the series finale, "Whenever You're Ready", Franich pointed to "Somewhere Else" as "the all-time best Good Place episode" as it "plumbed a deep well of human frailty"; he found that the show drifted too far into escapism after this episode. In another review for The Verge, Joshua Rivera also described the episode as "the apex of The Good Place's storytelling prowess". A ranking of the show's episodes before the series finale by The Ringer placed "Somewhere Else" twelfth, complimenting the "incredibly smart writing", the philosophy discussed, and the show's reconfiguration within the episode. Den of Geek named "Somewhere Else" as one of the best television episodes of 2018, with Alec Bojalad calling it "equal parts twisty storytelling and emotional fulfillment".
