= Whenever You're Ready (The Good Place) =

- The Good Place episodes
- Episode nos.: Season 4 Episodes 13/14
- Directed by: Michael Schur
- Written by: Michael Schur
- Original air date: January 30, 2020
- Running time: 53 minutes

Guest appearances
- Maya Rudolph as the Judge/(Hydro)Gen; Marc Evan Jackson as Shawn; Tiya Sircar as Vicky; Mike O'Malley as Jeff; Nick Offerman as himself; Mary Steenburgen as teacher; Brandon Scott Jones as John Wheaton; Kirby Howell-Baptiste as Simone Garnett; Ben Koldyke as Brent Norwalk; Maribeth Monroe as Mindy St. Claire; Jason Mantzoukas as Derek; Mitch Narito as Donkey Doug; Eugene Cordero as Pillboi; Rebecca Hazlewood as Kamilah Al-Jamil; Ajay Mehta as Waqas Al-Jamil; Anna Khaja as Manisha Al-Jamil; Keston John as Uzo; Angela Trimbur as Madison; Meryl Hathaway as Brittany; Kurt Braunohler as Ken; Josh Siegal as Glenn; Noah Garfinkel as Doug Forcett; Mele Ihara as Beadie; Tom Yi as Albert; Todd May as himself; Pamela Hieronymi as herself; Adam Scott as Trevor (archive audio)

Episode chronology
← Previous "Patty"	Next → —
- The Good Place (season 4)

"Whenever You're Ready" is the two-part series finale of the American fantasy-comedy television series The Good Place. It is the thirteenth and fourteenth episode of the fourth season and the fifty-second and fifty-third episode overall. The episodes were both written and directed by series creator Michael Schur and originally aired in the United States on NBC on January 30, 2020.

The episode jumps forward from the previous episode to show the main characters existing happily in the Good Place. Over time, the four humans each realize when they feel complete, and they are presented with the opportunity to move on from their lives and end their time in the universe. Meanwhile, Michael, as an immortal being, seeks to find the same fulfillment.

Planning for the finale began in earnest during the show's third season, and in June 2019, Schur announced that the fourth season of the show would be its last. Many cast members from earlier episodes made guest appearances or cameos in the finale. The episode was seen by 2.32 million viewers in its original broadcast and received praise from critics, with many calling it a satisfying and emotional ending to the show.

== Plot ==
After some time, the afterlife system designed by Michael (Ted Danson) and the four humans is working smoothly. Jason (Manny Jacinto) is the first group member to realize he's ready to move on from the Good Place after he plays a perfect Madden NFL game in a simulation of TIAA Bank Field with his father Donkey Doug. He throws a going-away party and makes a necklace for Janet (D'Arcy Carden) to remember him. Janet leads Jason to a door in the woods; walking through will allow him to leave. Jason loses the necklace and apologizes for it, but Janet forgives him and leaves Jason to walk through on his own whenever he feels truly ready.

Tahani (Jameela Jamil) completes her afterlife goals when her parents arrive and apologize for mistreating her and her sister Kamilah (Rebecca Hazlewood) as children, allowing them to spend more time together. After a while she realizes she is ready to move on. However, she does not want to pass through the door and instead asks to become an architect. Although it is unprecedented for humans to become architects, Michael arranges for her to work her way through the ranks and earn her place.

Eleanor (Kristen Bell) suspects that Chidi (William Jackson Harper) is ready to leave and panics. To get him to stay, she takes him to the Acropolis of Athens and Paris, which both have significance to him. Chidi realizes what Eleanor is doing; Eleanor confesses she's afraid of being abandoned, and Chidi agrees to stay. However, at dinner, Eleanor recalls What We Owe to Each Other and realizes she is creating selfish, unjustifiable "rules" to keep Chidi there. She allows him to leave. After one last night with Eleanor, Chidi leaves in the early morning before Eleanor wakes up (at her request), follows Janet to the door and walks through. Jason suddenly appears, having found the necklace in his pocket. He explains he waited eons for Janet to return by living peacefully in the woods, almost like a monk. After giving Janet the necklace, Jason walks through the door.

Without the rest of the group, Michael and Eleanor struggle to find fulfillment. Eleanor visits Mindy St. Claire (Maribeth Monroe) and convinces her to enter the new afterlife system under Tahani's oversight. However, despite this, she is still not ready to walk through the door. Michael tries to use the door, but since he is immortal it does not work. Eleanor persuades the Judge (Maya Rudolph) to make Michael human, allowing him to live on Earth and eventually enter the afterlife system.

As "Michael Realman" begins a normal life on Earth, Eleanor is finally ready to leave. She walks through the door and becomes a series of sparks in the sky. One spark drifts down to a man on Earth (Kurt Braunohler), about to throw a wrongly delivered letter away. The spark drifts into him, and he picks it up and decides to track down the owner. He delivers the letter to the right address, which is Michael's. Michael thanks the man and tells him to "take it sleazy".

== Production ==
=== Development and writing ===
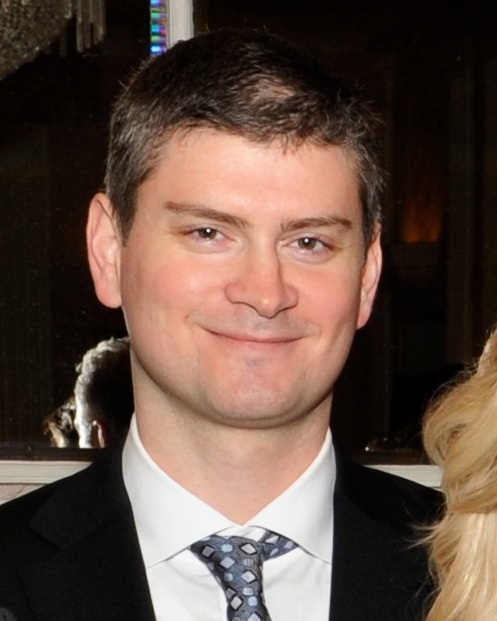
Michael Schur, series creator and writer/director for the episode

After NBC renewed The Good Place for a fourth season, series creator Michael Schur announced that the upcoming season would be the show's last. In a panel discussion in June 2019, he explained that he and the writing staff had started to "map out, as best [they] could, the trajectory of the show" during season two and felt that ending after four seasons provided "the right lifespan". According to Schur, the plans for the finale were not in place when he created the show and were instead formulated over the course of season three; during season four, the ideas for the finale would change very little. The cast was told about the plan for the season, including the finale, before shooting began on season four.

The episode was written by Schur, marking his fifth writing credit for the show. D'Arcy Carden revealed that several of the cast members, including herself, William Jackson Harper, and Marc Evan Jackson, read the script for the first time during the weekend of Comic-Con and were brought to tears by the ending.

=== Casting ===
Schur noted that in contrast to his previous show, Parks and Recreation, he was able to bring back many recurring characters from previous episodes and give them a send-off. This includes Maya Rudolph as the Judge, Tiya Sircar as the demon Vicky, Mike O'Malley as Jeff the Doorman, and Ben Koldyke as Brent, among others. Schur wanted to include an appearance by Leslie Grossman, who played Eleanor's mother Donna, but the idea was dropped due to scheduling conflicts.

The episode includes several cameos. Nick Offerman appears as himself advising Tahani about woodworking. Offerman had originally been approached for the role of Shawn and voiced a demon in an earlier episode. Mary Steenburgen plays Michael's guitar teacher on Earth; Steenburgen and Ted Danson are married in real life. Noah Garfinkel makes his first in-person appearance as Doug Forcett, who had previously been played by Michael McKean. Garfinkel had posed for a picture as Doug seen earlier in the show. Todd May and Pamela Hieronymi appear as themselves in a seminar hosted by Chidi; both served as philosophical advisors during the show's run.

=== Filming ===
Schur served as director for the episode, making this his fourth directing credit for the show.

The scenes for the door were shot in a grove of coastal redwoods near San Francisco. The door, composed of a set of branches shaped into an arch, was left over from a wedding and was simply touched up by the crew. Other scenes were shot on location in Athens and Paris over the course of seven days. The crew was able to film at the Parthenon at sunrise, which Kristen Bell described as a "breathtaking" and "humbling" experience. A separate neighborhood used for filming in Athens was specifically chosen for its resemblance to the show's original neighborhood. In Paris, filming was more difficult due to crowds, but the death of former French president Jacques Chirac reduced traffic and allowed for more time to film. The final scene shot for the show was on the Pont des Arts when Eleanor begs Chidi to stay; Bell and Harper agreed that the scene was very difficult to film emotionally. Both Carden and Bell remarked that they were widely recognized by fans of the show while shooting on location.

=== Music ===
An excerpt from Arvo Pärt's Spiegel im Spiegel is included in the episode when Chidi gets ready to leave. Series composer David Schwartz also created a full version of "The Purple Train to Groovy Town", a song Michael works on over the course of the episode; while it was ultimately not used due to time constraints, Schur indicated that the song would eventually be released online.

== Themes ==
Schur explained that one of the key ideas he found when creating the show was the concept of karma in Hinduism, in which there is a cycle of rebirth and people improve and digress over time. He remarked that if something is eternal, "everybody's going to be a little miserable." Hence, he felt it was important to say that "at some point, you'd be like, 'All right, back in the pool.'" In the episode, Chidi uses a speech inspired by Buddhism about a wave in the ocean to make a similar point — the wave forms itself into something meaningful and powerful before returning to where it came from. Schur also identified hopefulness as one of the show's overarching themes and sought to create a finale grounded in that message, commenting that the decision to keep trying despite obstacles "ultimately became the thing we were arguing for".

In an interview, May and Hieronymi addressed the episode's position in the debate between whether mortality or immortality is preferable. The episode quotes from one of May's books on death, which states, "Mortality offers meaning to the events of our lives, and morality helps us navigate that meaning." May explained the quote by saying that death gives us a finite amount of time and forces us to consider "[w]hat's important and what's not important". Along similar lines of reasoning, the episode proves that immortality would lead to boredom and loss of meaning and that fragility and preciousness are naturally reliant on each other. Hieronymi agreed that the show argues "an infinite and trouble-less life would be meaningless", though she was personally skeptical of that idea and pointed out that people like Tahani found meaning in immortality by addressing a need — in Tahani's case, helping other people by becoming an architect.

Several commentators noted that the finale offered a metaphor for both the show itself and television more generally. The door mirrors the decision for the show to end on its own terms, leaving an absence in its wake but still remaining meaningful. The Judge's eventual acceptance of the four humans seems to represent Schur's hope that television can make people kinder and more thoughtful toward others.

== Reception ==
=== Broadcast and ratings ===
"Whenever You're Ready" aired on January 30, 2020, in a 90-minute timeslot with a post-show special hosted by Seth Meyers. NBC did not release the episode to critics and reporters ahead of time, and the official description of the episode was left deliberately vague: "Various conversations occur, between various groups of people."

In its original broadcast, the episode was seen by 2.32 million American viewers and achieved a 0.7/4 in the 18-49 demographic; both viewership measures were the show's best since the season premiere in September. The post-show special was seen by 1.93 million viewers with a 0.5/3 in the 18-49 demographic. After factoring in Live+7 viewership, the episode rose to 3.71 million viewers and a 1.3 rating among adults 18–49, while the special rose to 2.85 million viewers and a 0.9 rating among adults 18–49.

=== Reviews ===
The episode received positive reviews from many critics. Palmer Haasch of IGN gave the episode 9 out of 10, denoting an "amazing" episode and calling it "a poignant rumination on what gives meaning to our lives". Although he thought certain parts were almost too idyllic, he appreciated the catharsis of the ending and praised the show for knowing when to end. Dennis Perkins of The A.V. Club gave the episode an A, citing the jokes and performances in addition to the emotional beats. He noted similarities to the finale of Six Feet Under and remarked that it "never feels like simple feel-goodery that all these characters get into the Good Place". Noel Murray of Vulture gave the episode 5 out of 5 stars, describing it as "really beautiful to watch". He cited Chidi's departure as the most emotional sequence and called the episode "both an ending and an epilogue". Kathryn VanArendonk, also writing for Vulture, appreciated that the show left some questions open instead of introducing a new twist or trying to create an unsatisfying answer for everything.

Writing for the Chicago Sun-Times, Richard Roeper remarked that the show was able to give its characters and its viewers a "satisfying moment of closure" while also including humor and thoughtful moments. Hannah Giorgis of The Atlantic called the episode "a delightful return to form" for the series and singled out the relationship between Eleanor and Michael for praise. She also noted that the show delivered on its early promises and allowed its main characters, with the possible exception of Jason, to evolve. Alissa Wilkinson of Vox enjoyed the episode, praising it for being "incredibly sincere" and for highlighting what it means to be human.

Some critics were more ambivalent about the episode. Ben Travers of IndieWire gave the episode a B, opining that the finale "struggled to live up to its potential". He thought that the characters' motivations were somewhat thin, but he praised the focus on the core cast as well as Danson's performance. Emily VanDerWerff of Vox also found the characters to be too thin to fully sell the ending, though she commended Bell's and Harper's performances and enjoyed the show's "gentle acceptance of death". Spencer Kornhaber of The Atlantic expressed concerns that the show's message might inadvertently end up coming across as a hopeless one that embraces suicide. He also criticized the episode for ending the characters' relationships in favor of an individualistic sense of "completion".

=== Awards and nominations ===
For his work on the episode, Schur was nominated for the Primetime Emmy Award for Outstanding Writing for a Comedy Series. Danson and Harper submitted this episode to support their respective Emmy nominations for Outstanding Lead Actor in a Comedy Series and Outstanding Supporting Actor in a Comedy Series. The episode won the Ray Bradbury Nebula Award for Outstanding Dramatic Presentation and the Hugo Award for Best Dramatic Presentation, Short Form.
