= Michael's Gambit =

- The Good Place episode
- Episode no.: Season 1 Episode 13
- Directed by: Michael Schur
- Written by: Michael Schur
- Original air date: January 19, 2017

Guest appearances
- Tiya Sircar as Vicky / "real" Eleanor Shellstrop; Marc Evan Jackson as Shawn; Bambadjan Bamba as Bambadjan; Luke Guldan as Chris Baker; John Hartmann as Bart; Jama Williamson as Val

Episode chronology
← Previous "Mindy St. Claire"	Next → "Everything Is Great!"
- The Good Place season 1

"Michael's Gambit" is the thirteenth and final episode of the first season of the American fantasy-comedy television series The Good Place. The episode was written and directed by series creator Michael Schur; the episode originally aired on NBC on January 19, 2017, immediately following the previous episode, "Mindy St. Claire".

In the episode, Eleanor, Chidi, Tahani, and Jason must decide which two of them will go to the Bad Place to make up for Eleanor and Jason's absence there. They struggle to find a pairing on which they can all agree, and Eleanor realizes why their time in the Good Place has been unusual. In flashbacks, Michael wonders if there is a better way to design neighborhoods in the afterlife.

The episode is known for its plot twist, in which the neighborhood is revealed to be the Bad Place in disguise. Schur created the ending when developing the show but kept it secret outside of a few crew members, with the exception of Kristen Bell and Ted Danson, who were told when they signed on as cast members. The episode was seen by 3.93 million Americans in its original broadcast and was acclaimed by critics, with many praising the twist and Danson's performance. For his work on the episode, Schur was nominated for several awards, including the Hugo Award for Best Dramatic Presentation, Short Form.

== Plot ==
After Eleanor (Kristen Bell) and Jason (Manny Jacinto) barely miss the deadline to return to the Good Place, Shawn (Marc Evan Jackson) decides the Bad Place is owed two individuals and gives Eleanor, Jason, Chidi (William Jackson Harper), and Tahani (Jameela Jamil) thirty minutes to pick who to send. Eleanor proposes that she and Jason go, since they arrived in the Good Place by accident. Jason resists but is eventually convinced. They say their goodbyes, but the "real" Eleanor (Tiya Sircar) appears and announces she would rather go to the Bad Place than stay with Chidi, her supposed soulmate who does not love her. This forces the group to reconsider.

Shawn tells Michael (Ted Danson) privately that Michael will be in trouble for his mistakes. Flashbacks show Michael receiving his first neighborhood to design and wondering if there is a better way for architects to do their job.

As the group discusses who to send now, they quickly descend into arguing. Eleanor has a sudden realization and calls Michael and Shawn back. She explains that it is impossible for them to ever leave for the Bad Place because they have been there all along. The neighborhood is actually a pseudo-Good Place presenting challenges designed to psychologically torture the four humans: Eleanor is surrounded by people who are better than her, Chidi was forced to struggle with Eleanor and Jason's secrets, Jason was left confused and anxious due to his cover story, and Tahani was often left feeling isolated. Real Eleanor and the other residents are demons working with Michael. In another flashback, Michael pitches his neighborhood as an experiment where humans torture each other without realizing it; Shawn, who is actually Michael's boss, expresses doubts.

Eleanor asks how Chidi and Tahani, who seem like good people, ended up in the Bad Place. Tahani realizes her fundraising efforts were tainted by selfish motivations, and Michael explains that Chidi's rigidity and indecisiveness made others miserable. To the humans' horror, Michael announces he will erase their memories and restart the experiment. When Michael steps out to talk to Shawn, Eleanor quickly writes a note and gives it to Janet (D'Arcy Carden). Shawn allows Michael to try again but warns that this is his last shot.

Michael wipes the humans' memories and reboots the neighborhood. He welcomes Eleanor to the afterlife again and introduces her new "soulmate", Chris Baker (Luke Guldan). When Chris leaves, Janet appears and gives Eleanor her note, which reads "Eleanor — Find Chidi".

== Production ==
=== Development ===
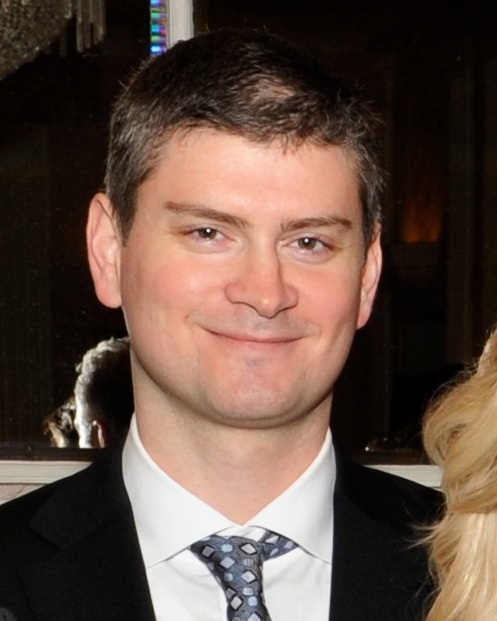
Michael Schur, series creator and writer/director for the episode

The episode was written and directed by Michael Schur, the show's creator. It is his second writing credit (after the season premiere) and first directing credit for the series.

In an interview with IGN Schur revealed that when developing The Good Place, he turned to dramas such as Lost and Breaking Bad, which contained many cliffhangers and, in his words, left viewers "so absorbed in something and so intrigued by something that you have to know how it ends." During the development process, he worked with Lost co-creator Damon Lindelof to gather advice and input on the series; Lindelof urged Schur to "take the time to think about what you're going to do before you do it." As a result, the entirety of the first season, as well as the start to the second season, was planned out in advance, and Schur and the writing staff would deviate little from this plan during production of the first season. Schur also took some inspiration for the flashbacks from Lost. He noted that the scenes were "usually [a] two- or three-beat mini-story, told in distinct beats throughout the episode [and] reflective of the larger question of the episode."

The network would also renew the series for a 13-episode second season in the wake of the finale.

=== Writing ===
The episode was written and filmed before the show premiered. Originally, the writers had several other ideas for how to have Eleanor tell herself about Michael's scheme, including writing a message on herself in a manner similar to Memento, before deciding on giving Janet the note. The sinister laugh from Michael after Eleanor figured out his plan was improvised by Danson after several takes and spliced together with other footage. In the rebooted neighborhood, many details, such as the furnishings in Michael's office and the clown paintings in Eleanor's house, were slightly tweaked or rearranged; Schur later explained that this shows how extensive Michael's plan is.

Schur told Kristen Bell and Ted Danson about the season's twist ending when they were originally brought on board. He felt it was important for their characters to know what would happen, mainly since Michael orchestrates the scheme and Eleanor is the one to figure it out. He explained, "I wanted them to know the whole picture. I thought it would be sort of uncool to Ted Danson to say, 'I want you to play an angel,' and then four months later go, 'Just kidding. You're a devil.'" Schur also told the writers about the twist at the beginning in order to ensure the writing would be consistent and set up the finale, but he did not tell the other actors on the show until they were near the end of filming for the season. He later remarked, "They gave the most honest and real performance they could give, simply because they didn't know."

== Release ==
While NBC had made previous episodes available to the press early, the network did not release the finale ahead of time, likely to preserve the twist.

=== Ratings ===
"Michael's Gambit" originally aired on NBC on January 19, 2017, as part of an hour-long block with the previous episode, "Mindy St. Claire". It was watched by an estimated 3.93 million American viewers, placing third in its time slot behind The Great Indoors and Grey's Anatomy. This marked a 6% increase in total viewers compared to the previous week and was the show's highest viewership since October. The episode also achieved a 1.1 rating among adults ages 18–49, placing third behind The Great Indoors and Hell's Kitchen.

=== Critical reception ===
The episode received acclaim from critics. Dennis Perkins of The A.V. Club gave the episode an A, calling it "a brilliant lie, both on the part of Schur—and of Michael." He praised Danson's performance in the episode and remarked that "the dramatic and comedic possibilities opening up [...] genuinely demand a second season". Liz Shannon Miller of IndieWire also gave the episode an A. She wrote that "[t]he reveal that Chidi and Tahani were also not good enough for 'the good place' is a massive one, but the fact that it ultimately made sense testifies to the depth of character development that Schur and the writers had been able to build into the show." She also praised Danson's "beautifully bumbling performance" for hiding the twist up until that point and agreed that the show set itself up well for a second season. Eric Goldman of IGN rated the episode 9 out of 10 and said, "The Good Place was already a very funny and clever comedy, but this reveal raises the stakes in a big way." He praised the twist and thought that "finding out Michael was actually the villain was what really made the whole thing amazing"; he also highlighted the humor in the episode, adding that the humans' debate "awesomely spotlighted the distinctive personalities of all four of the main characters." Allie Pape of Vulture gave the episode 5 out of 5 stars, remarking that the twist "is the sort of move that masterfully adds depth to all the show's emotional bonding" and praising Danson for "utterly nail[ing] the heel turn".

Writing for Variety, Maureen Ryan compared the episode favorably to Westworld, another plot-heavy show with big twists; she noted that unlike Westworld, The Good Place's twist "wasn't necessarily easy to figure out, and even if you'd guessed it, it didn't really matter, because the show was a whole lot of fun regardless of what was going on in the main plot." She also called the finale "especially crisp and entertaining" with "the kind of unstoppable momentum that carried [her] past any mild wobbles." Caroline Framke of Vox called the twist "a gutsy move" that the show landed "with ease and a confident grin" and likened watching prior episodes in light of the twist to rewatching The Sixth Sense, adding that lines from earlier "take on new significance in the best way." Lenika Cruz of The Atlantic noted that unlike other shows blending comedy and drama, "The Good Place is, tonally, 100 percent sitcom" but has "the spine of a twist-y, reality-questioning show like Lost or Westworld". She described the reveal as a "a Truman Show/No Exit-style nightmare" and remarked that the "structural sitcomminess—where the show has to revert to the status quo" set the foundation for season two nicely.

Several critics made comparisons between the episode and then-current events. In her review, Pape noted that it "couldn't be a better reflection on the world we're about to live in, where Donald Trump is president: One man's desire to do something entirely different and to be the envy of his peers leads to hell for many, many other people, who are mostly being punished for the crime of being human." In a retrospective article, Ellen Jones of The Guardian noted that the episode, which aired the day before Trump's inauguration, resonated with many viewers who opposed Trump, with Eleanor's moment of realization that "This is the Bad Place!" becoming a liberal meme. However, Jones noted that the show also challenged liberal attitudes, with the four humans embodying "the traits conservatives most disparage in their defeated foe: Tahani's smug condescension; Chidi's indecisive idealism; Jason's obliviousness; and Eleanor's ironic detachment." Schur has denied that the show is about Trump or modern-day America and noted that work on the show began before the 2016 election took place.

=== Awards ===
At the 2018 Hugo Awards, the episode was nominated for Best Dramatic Presentation, Short Form; it ultimately lost to another episode of the show, season 2's "The Trolley Problem". The episode was also nominated for the Ray Bradbury Award for Outstanding Dramatic Presentation at the 2017 Nebula Awards; it lost to Get Out.
