= The Trolley Problem =

The Trolley Problem may refer to

- The trolley problem, a thought experiment
- The Trolley Problem (The Good Place), an episode of the TV series
- The Trolley Problem (Inside No. 9), an episode of the TV anthology
