= Jason Mendoza =

Jason Mendoza may refer to:

- Jason Mendoza (The Good Place character)
- "Jason Mendoza" (The Good Place episode)
