= Tahani Al-Jamil =

Tahani Al-Jamil may refer to:

- Tahani Al-Jamil (The Good Place character)
- "Tahani Al-Jamil" (The Good Place episode)
