= Mindy St. Claire =

Mindy St. Claire may refer to:

- Mindy St. Claire (The Good Place character)
- "Mindy St. Claire" (The Good Place episode)
