= Sun Chaser =

- Genre: Adventure; Fantasy
- Created by: Bernard Badion; Bobby Pontillas
- Written by: Bernard Badion; Thomas Reyes
- Directed by: Bobby Pontillas
- Voices of: Manny Jacinto; Liza Soberano; Eugene Cordero; Charo Santos; JR De Guzman; AC Bonifacio; Zia Dantes; KD Estrada; Dingdong Dantes
- Theme music composer: Joaquin Santos
- Composer: Joaquin Santos
- Country of origin: Philippines
- Original languages: Filipino; English
- No. of episodes: 1

Production
- Executive producers: Juan Miguel del Rosario; Marlyn Montano; Liza Soberano; Manny Jacinto
- Producer: Eugene Cordero
- Running time: 12 minutes
- Production companies: Funny Face Films; Playlab Animation; Toon City Animation

Original release
- Network: YouTube
- Release: June 22, 2026

Sun Chaser is a Philippine animated web series created by Bernard Badion and Bobby Pontillas. The pilot episode was released on June 22, 2026 with further episodes planned.

== Premise ==
Inspired by the Philippine mythology, the series revolves a teenager named Jordan Santos, whose summer break in the Philippines takes a wild turn when a supernatural curse strikes his family and transforms his island home into a battleground of mythical creatures. With the help of quirky beings like a dwende and a manananggal, Jordan embarks on an epic quest rooted in vibrant Filipino mythology as he discovers his predestined role as the Spirit Guardian.

== Characters ==
- Jordan Santos (voiced by Manny Jacinto); a self-absorbed teen visiting his grandmother’s island in the Philippines.
- Angie (voiced by Liza Soberano); a fierce and protective manananggal.
- Archie (voiced by Eugene Cordero); an old grumpy duwende.
- Lola (voiced by Charo Santos); Jordan's grandmother.
- JR (voiced by JR De Guzman)
- Zoe (voiced by AC Bonifacio)
- Sessa and La Bamba (voiced by Zia Dantes and KD Estrada respectively) Jordan's twin cousins.
- Necrofrost (voiced as Dingdong Dantes)
- Queen Marisol (voiced by Liza Soberano)
- Guards 1 and 2 (voiced by Gilbert Galon)

== Production ==
=== Conception ===
The series was created by Pontillas with Bernard Badion, together with Toon City and Playlab animation studios. Pontillas revealed his inspiration for a passion project, stating "came from a personal place of wanting to tell a story rooted in Filipino mythology and identity, through the eyes of a young Filipino American trying to reconnect with his roots."

=== Production ===
Sun Chaser was reportedly made to have a "hand-crafted" feel with the animatic made through Storyboard Pro and the animation made through Toon Boom Harmony.

== Release ==
Sun Chaser premiered on YouTube with the 12-minute pilot released on June 22, 2026. A Kickstarter for the series was launched on June 23, 2026 to potentially fund the production of further episodes. However, the Kickstarter was cancelled on July 11, 2026. At the time of its cancellation, it made $18,184 out of its $100,000 goal. The creators stated that their partner which funded the pilot has committed to support the release of a second episode.

== Episodes ==
No.	Title	Directed by	Written by	Original release date	Prod. code
1	"Pilot"	Bobby Pontillas	Bernard Badion & Thomas Reyes	June 22, 2026	N/A
An introverted teenager accidentally ignores his grandmother's instructions and triggers a magic portal, unleashing supernatural monsters and mythical creatures into the world. Through the accident, he soon uncovers a long-buried family secret, discovering that he's destined to become the next Spirit Guardian, a member of an sacred, ancient bloodline tasked with protecting the fragile boundary between the human and spirit worlds.

== Reception ==
=== Awards and nominations ===
Year	Award	Category	Nominee	Result	Ref.
2025	Annecy International Animation Film Festival	MIFA Animation du Monde Prize	Sun Chaser	Won	
