= The Creatress =

2019 comedy-drama film directed by Jason Cook

- Film poster
- Directed by: Jason Cook
- Written by: Jason Cook
- Produced by: Liliana Kligman-Roitman; Jason Cook
- Starring: Lindy Booth; Peter Bogdanovich; Fran Drescher
- Cinematography: Christopher Gosch
- Edited by: Sherwood Jones; David Bergan
- Music by: Jeff Babko
- Production companies: DigitalCuvée; Cafe Oscuro Films
- Distributed by: Gravitas Ventures
- Release date: August 27, 2019
- Running time: 111 minutes
- Country: United States
- Language: English

The Creatress is a 2019 American comedy-drama film directed by Jason Cook and starring Lindy Booth, Peter Bogdanovich and Fran Drescher.

== Cast ==
- Fran Drescher as Carrie O'Connor
- Peter Bogdanovich as Theo Mencken
- Lindy Booth as Eryn Bellow
- Kayla Ewell as Lacey
- David Lago as Rand
- Luke Guldan as Seth
- Francis Lloyd Corby as Brad
- Dante Basco as Frankin
