= The Stalemate =

American western film

- Directed by: Nicholas Arioli
- Screenplay by: Nicholas Arioli
- Produced by: Molly Conners; Amanda Bowers; Andrew Bosworth; Cari Tuna
- Starring: Ben Foster; Fiona Shaw; Manny Jacinto; Shea Whigham; Giorgia Whigham; Tony Hale; Jeremy Bobb; Anthony Carrigan
- Production company: Phiphen Pictures
- Country: United States
- Language: English

The Stalemate is an upcoming American comedy western film written and directed by Nicholas Arioli. It is starring Ben Foster, Fiona Shaw and Manny Jacinto.

== Premise ==
In the frontier of the old west, a chase develops involving a thief and a sheriff.

== Cast ==
- Ben Foster
- Fiona Shaw
- Manny Jacinto
- Shea Whigham
- Giorgia Whigham
- Tony Hale
- Jeremy Bobb
- Anthony Carrigan
- Paul Sparks
- Albert Cheng

== Production ==
The film marks the feature length directorial debut of writer and director Nicholas Arioli. The film is produced by Molly Conners and Amanda Bowers from Phiphen Pictures, Andrew Bosworth and Cari Tuna.

The cast is led by Ben Foster. Fiona Shaw and Manny Jacinto and also includes Anthony Carrigan, Jeremy Bobb, Paul Sparks, Tony Hale, Giorgia Whigham, and Shea Whigham.

Principal photography took place in Santa Fe, New Mexico in the first half of 2025.
