= Peelers (film) =

- Directed by: Sevé Schelenz
- Written by: Lisa DeVita
- Produced by: Lisa DeVita; Todd Giroux; Sevé Schelenz; Brendan Smith
- Starring: Wren Walker; Caz Odin Darko; Madison J. Loos
- Cinematography: Lindsay George
- Edited by: Sevé Schelenz
- Music by: Vincent Mai
- Production companies: Pounds (LBS) Pictures; Sleep Apnea Productions Inc.
- Distributed by: TW Media Events (Canada); Uncork'd Entertainment (US)
- Release dates: 9 April 2016 (Palm Beach International Film Festival); 24 March 2017 (Canada); 27 March 2017 (US)
- Running time: 95 minutes
- Country: Canada
- Language: English

Peelers is a 2016 Canadian comedy horror film directed by Sevé Schelenz and written by Lisa DeVita, starring Wren Walker, Caz Odin Darko and Madison J. Loos.

== Cast ==
- Wren Walker as Blue Jean
- Caz Odin Darko as Remy
- Madison J. Loos as Logan
- Cameron Dent as Tony
- Al Dales as Chromagnum
- Momona Komagata as Frankie
- Kirsty Peters as Licorice / Carla
- Nicki Wallin as Baby / Elaine
- Victoria Gomez as Tina
- Rafael Mateo as Pablo
- Donovan Wolf as Mario
- Edwin Perez as Jesus
- Andrea Rosolia as Panuche
- Manny Jacinto as Travis
- Emma Docker as Aja
- Richard Olak as Jim
- James Challis as Mike
- Jason Asuncion as Farmer John
- Mako Tsunami as Stuey

== Release ==
The film premiered at the Palm Beach International Film Festival in April 2016. It received a theatrical release in Canada on 24 March 2017 and was released to VOD in the US on 28 March. It was released on DVD and Blu-Ray on 4 July.

== Reception ==
Kevin Haldon of Nerdly called the film a "balls-to-the-wall genre-bending action/horror that destroys the cliché stripper horror sub-genre by giving us a story packed with exciting twists, baseball, strippers of unusual talents and a strong female lead" and praised the acting, script, direction and effects. Chris Alexander of Comingsoon.net praised the characterisation of Blue Jean and called the film "fun, innovative, hot and bloody bit of mayhem, professionally made with flair." Michael DeFellipo of Horror Society gave the film a score of 9/10 and called it the "best strip club horror film of all time". DeFellipo also praised the lead performances, opining that they "did a superb job of carrying the movie."

Luiz H. Coelho of Bloody Disgusting wrote that while the "plot doesn’t contain any revolutionary twists and turns", which "keeps Peelers from becoming the instant classic that it sets out to be", it features "unexpectedly likable and well-developed characters." Matt Boiselle of Dread Central rated the film 3.5 stars out of 5 and stated that "there’s nothing groundbreaking here, but it’s the fun in the visuals that makes this watch a good time." James Evans of Starburst wrote that while the film is not original and "frequently feels at least a little laboured, arguably cynically so", it is "brazen in its pursuit of a late night audience" and Walker "makes a winning hero". Charleston Picou of HorrorNews.net praised Blue Jean's characterisation and the practical effects. However, he criticised the "uneven" acting, writing that while Walker and Darko "gave decent performances", the rest of the cast were "kind of bad". Picou also criticised the script's "over reliance on one liners", the "forced" humour and "logic gaps".
