= JR De Guzman =

Filipino-American comedian

- Born: 1989 or 1990 (age 35–36); Pangasinan, Philippines
- Education: University of California, Davis

Comedy career
- Years active: 2011–present
- Subjects: Culture; race; relationships

YouTube information
- Channel: JR De Guzman
- Years active: 2012–present
- Genre: Comedy
- Subscribers: 427 thousand
- Views: 111.48 million
- Last updated: June 20, 2026
- Website: jrdeguzman.com

JR De Guzman is a Filipino American comedian and actor.

== Early life and education ==
JR De Guzman was born in 1989 or 1990 in Pangasinan, Philippines to Tony and Teresa de Guzman and have two brothers. His family emigrated to the United States while he was one year old and lived in a retrofitted garage in Los Angeles, California before eventually moving to Sacramento.

De Guzman was one of three Asians at the all-boys Catholic high school he attended. He later studied at the University of California, Davis and was president of its Pacific Asian Club. He graduated in 2012.

== Comedy career ==
=== History ===
De Guzman started his career as a comedian around 2011. It began with fulfilling an assignment at the musical comedy class while he was in UC. He began doing comedy in college and bar shows. He later referred to YouTube to develop his craft.

De Guzman made a tour in Asia and Europe in 2014 and did standup comedy. He caters to various audiences and thus uses English in his standup rather than Filipino, a language he could speak and understand. His break in comedy came after his set in Crest Theatre, Sacramento went viral in YouTube in 2014.

He was named the winner of the 13th edition of the annual Standup NBC in 2017 besting eight other finalists selected among 600 candidates from across the United States.

De Guzman was among the comedians featured in the 2018 Netflix special The Comedy Lineup.

=== Subject matter and style ===
De Guzman primarily focuses on the topic of culture, race, and relationships in his standups. He claims to not consciously avoid certain topics, believing that any topic can be a subject of a joke if it comes from one's perspective and is "genuine".

== Other television appearances ==
De Guzman voiced the character JR in the upcoming web animated series, Sun Chaser.

== Filmography ==
=== Television ===
Year	Title	Role	Ref.
2017	Standup NBC	Himself (contestant)	
2018	The Comedy Lineup	Himself (contestant)	
2026	Sun Chaser	JR (voice)	
