= The Good Place season 2 =

The Good Place
- Season 2
- Region 1 DVD cover art
- Starring: Kristen Bell; William Jackson Harper; Jameela Jamil; D'Arcy Carden; Manny Jacinto; Ted Danson
- No. of episodes: 13

Release
- Original network: NBC
- Original release: September 20, 2017 – February 1, 2018

Season chronology
- ← Previous; Season 1 Next → Season 3

The second season of the fantasy comedy television series The Good Place, created by Michael Schur, began airing September 20, 2017, on NBC in the United States. The season is produced by Fremulon, 3 Arts Entertainment, and Universal Television. The season concluded on February 1, 2018, and consisted of 13 episodes.

The series focuses on Eleanor Shellstrop (Kristen Bell), a deceased young woman who wakes up in the afterlife and is sent by Michael (Ted Danson) to "the Good Place", a heaven-like utopia he designed, in reward for her righteous life. However, she quickly realizes that she was sent there by mistake and must hide her morally imperfect behavior (past and present). William Jackson Harper, Jameela Jamil, and Manny Jacinto co-star as other residents of the Good Place, together with D'Arcy Carden as an artificial being helping the inhabitants. Each of the episodes are listed as "Chapter (xx)" following the opening title card.

== Cast ==
=== Main ===
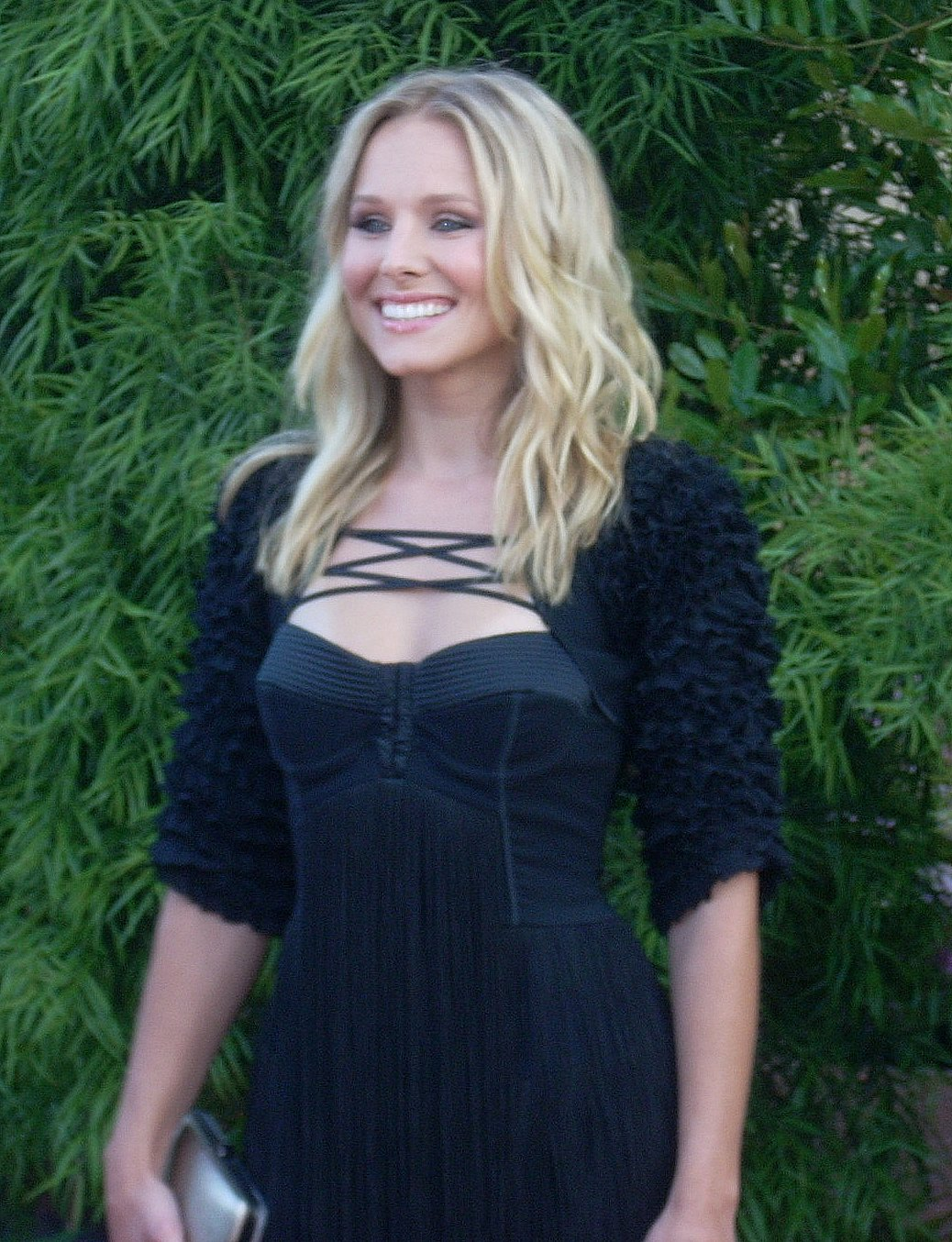
Kristen Bell portrays series protagonist Eleanor Shellstrop.

- Kristen Bell as Eleanor Shellstrop, a deceased, selfish saleswoman from Phoenix, Arizona who winds up in the Good Place by mistake. In order to earn her spot, she recruits Chidi to teach her the fundamentals of becoming a better person.
- William Jackson Harper as Chidi Anagonye, a deceased professor of ethics and moral philosophy from Senegal. Assigned as Eleanor's soulmate in Michael's first Good Place experiment, he gives her ethics lessons in an attempt to make her a better person.
- Jameela Jamil as Tahani Al-Jamil, a deceased, wealthy English philanthropist who believes she belongs in the Good Place. She forms an unlikely friendship with Eleanor, who initially dislikes her positive attitude, condescending way of speaking, and tendency to name drop.
- D'Arcy Carden as Janet, a programmed guide and knowledge bank who acts as the Good Place's main source of information and can provide its residents with whatever they desire. Later, Janet gains a more humanlike disposition, and begins to act differently than the way she was designed.
  - Carden also plays Bad Janet, a disrespectful version of Janet designed not to respond to residents properly.
- Manny Jacinto as Jason Mendoza, a deceased amateur DJ and drug dealer from Jacksonville, Florida, who winds up in the Good Place by mistake. He is introduced as Jianyu Li, a Taiwanese monk who took a vow of silence. Later, Jason proves to be an immature and unintelligent, but kindhearted Jacksonville Jaguars and Blake Bortles fan.
- Ted Danson as Michael, a Bad Place architect who runs the Good Place neighborhood in which Eleanor, Chidi, Tahani, and Jason reside. Michael has a deep affinity for the mundane aspects of human life, like playing with paper clips or searching for one's car keys. In the first season finale, it is revealed that he has been tricking the four humans all along and is actually a demon torturing them, though he later teams up with them. "Michael" is a Hebrew name meaning "who is like God?"

=== Recurring ===
- Tiya Sircar as Vicky Sengupta, a Bad Place demon who is introduced as the "real Eleanor Shellstrop" in the first attempt of Michael's torture plan.
- Marc Evan Jackson as Shawn, Michael's wicked boss. Shawn gives Michael two chances to pull off the torture experiment, and later turns against him when he finds out about Michael's betrayal.
- Maribeth Monroe as Mindy St. Claire, a deceased corporate lawyer and cocaine addict who just barely toed the line of earning enough Good Place points before her death and thus was awarded her own private Medium Place.
- Jason Mantzoukas as Derek, a wacky artificial rebound boyfriend created by Janet.
- Rebecca Hazlewood as Kamilah Al-Jamil, Tahani's massively successful and competitive younger sister.
- Maya Rudolph as Judge Gen (short for Hydrogen), an eternal judge who rules on interdimensional matters between the Good Place and the Bad Place.
- Josh Siegal as Glen, a bad place demon who acts as a Good Place resident. Siegal is a writer on the show and stepped into the part initially in the first season when the original actor was unable to secure a travel visa.

=== Guest ===
- Leslie Grossman as Donna Shellstrop, Eleanor's mother.
- Dax Shepard as Chet, a Bad Place demon responsible for torturing people guilty of toxic masculinity. Shepard is the husband of Kristen Bell, who plays Eleanor Shellstrop.

== Episodes ==
Season 2 episodes
| No. overall | No. in season | Title | Directed by | Written by | Original release date | Prod. code | U.S. viewers (millions) |
|---|---|---|---|---|---|---|---|
| 14 (Note: The second-season premiere aired as one hour-long episode, but the on-screen title identified it as "Chapters 14 & 15" of the series.) | 1 | "Everything Is Great!" (Part 1) | Trent O'Donnell | Jen Statsky | September 20, 2017 | 201 | 5.28 |
Eleanor's, Chidi's, Tahani's, and Jason's memories have been erased and they start over in the Bad Place. Shawn believes Michael's project will fail and Michael's existence will be ended through "retirement". Janet gives Eleanor the note she wrote to find Chidi. Chidi is forced to choose between two potential soulmates; just as he chooses Angelique, who seems ideal for him, Michael determines that the other woman, Pevita, with whom Chidi felt no connection, is his actual soulmate. Eleanor finds Chidi, but he is distracted by his own situation and is unwilling to help Eleanor. Tahani is dissatisfied that her soulmate Tomas is very short and has unrefined taste and that their home is small and cramped. Michael plans for Eleanor to get drunk and behave badly at the welcome party, but instead Tahani gets drunk and makes a scene.
| 15 | 2 | "Everything Is Great!" (Part 2) | Trent O'Donnell | Joe Mande | September 20, 2017 | 202 | 5.28 |
Jason's new soulmate is Luang, a monk who is meant to be his spiritual companion; Luang accompanies Jason and copies his every action, leaving Jason bored and desperate to escape. Jason becomes attracted to Janet, who is nice to him. Vicky, who portrayed "Real Eleanor", is frustrated by her new, minor role as pizza parlor owner Denise. Chidi realizes the paper of Eleanor's note is from a book in his library; he suspects they have met before. At Eleanor's house, Eleanor admits that she does not belong in the Good Place. Michael, Janet, Tahani, Jason, and everyone's supposed soulmates arrive. Tahani and Jason openly express their dissatisfaction and Eleanor figures out that they are not in the Good Place; she reveals the note. Michael again erases the humans' memories and reboots the Good Place, but conceals the false start from Shawn, who has disallowed a third attempt.
| 16 | 3 | "Dance Dance Resolution" | Drew Goddard | Megan Amram | September 28, 2017 | 203 | 4.67 |
Michael reboots the neighborhood hundreds of times, but Eleanor (and, on at least one occasion, Jason) eventually realizes its true nature each time. In the 802nd iteration, Eleanor and Chidi learn of the memory wipes when they discover dissatisfied neighborhood workers (including an undisguised demon) complaining about Michael's version of the Bad Place. Eleanor, Chidi, and Janet take the train to the Medium Place, where Mindy St. Claire reveals that it is Eleanor's sixteenth visit; Eleanor and her companions always return to Michael's neighborhood with a new plan to defeat him. Mindy also reveals that Eleanor and Chidi often form a sexual relationship and once mutually professed their love. In the neighborhood, Vicky and the other actors go on strike. Vicky presents their individual demands and hers is to take Michael's job; she threatens to reveal the multiple attempts to Shawn. Jason tells Michael about his dance crew being challenged to a dance-off and that they united to instead slash the other dancers' tires; when Eleanor returns and leads the humans in confronting Michael, he asks to form an alliance with them.
| 17 | 4 | "Team Cockroach" | Morgan Sackett | Dan Schofield | October 5, 2017 | 204 | 4.17 |
Michael tries to recruit all four humans to his plan, in which he will reboot the neighborhood but secretly leave their memories intact and they will feign ignorance; if they refuse, Michael asserts they will again detect the ruse, Vicky will expose him, and the humans will be remanded to traditional, hellish torture, while Michael is burned eternally. Michael also claims he can get the four and himself into the real Good Place. Chidi agrees quickly, accepting that his work on ethics in life was unsuccessful. Jason is oblivious, but Michael's bow tie earns his trust. Tahani insists she belongs in the Good Place, but concedes after Michael reveals her cause of death; she was crushed by a statue of her sister Kamillah that she pulled down, demonstrating Tahani's self-obsession. Eleanor initially plans to flee to Mindy's house, but accedes to Michael's plan after Michael informs her that Chidi never refused to help her. She adds a condition: Michael must participate in Chidi's ethics classes. Even though Michael sees humans as "cockroaches", he agrees. The neighborhood is rebooted with Vicky taking on the role of the top point earner and honorary mayor. The humans and Michael meet in secret and are joined by Janet, whose programming compels her to make humans happy; thus, she will support the only real humans present.
| 18 | 5 | "Existential Crisis" | Beth McCarthy-Miller | Andrew Law | October 12, 2017 | 206 | 4.05 |
When Chidi realizes that Michael's immortality prevents him from engaging with human ethics, he confronts Michael over the possibility of existence-ending "retirement". Michael becomes despondent and then replaces his existential crisis with a stereotypical midlife crisis, which Chidi determines is less psychologically productive. Eleanor explains to Michael that sadness over death is intrinsic to humanity; he thanks her and Chidi decides their studies can move forward. Tahani is tortured by having her birthday party for Gunnar overshadowed by an extravagant one planned by Vicky; Tahani is miserable despite knowing Vicky's plan and laments her character flaws that enable such superficial problems to affect her. Jason praises Tahani and they sleep together; both enjoy it, but Tahani wants to talk about it afterwards, while Jason is oblivious. Eleanor recalls formative experiences concerning death: Eleanor's alcoholic mother flippantly explaining the family dog's death to a young Eleanor, an adult Eleanor attending her father's funeral and claiming to be fine, and Eleanor crying into a toilet plunger at a Bed Bath & Beyond upon seeing a toothbrush holder designed for a family's use.
| 19 | 6 | "The Trolley Problem" | Dean Holland | Josh Siegal & Dylan Morgan | October 19, 2017 | 205 | 3.92 |
Chidi teaches the group the trolley problem thought experiment, but Michael's practical knowledge of the afterlife scoring system conflicts with Chidi's theoretical approach. Supposedly as a learning aid, Michael subjects Chidi to realistic simulations of the trolley problem and related ethical questions, then admits he is deliberately torturing Chidi. Chidi expels Michael, who tries to placate the humans with extravagant personalized gifts that Chidi calls bribes. Chidi allows Michael to return after Michael offers an apology that consists of exact and seemingly sincere wording Chidi has pre-approved. Tahani and Jason continue their relationship, but Tahani insists on secrecy while Jason wants to go public. Janet becomes their couples counselor. Over the course of a month, their relationship improves but Janet, performing beyond her specifications, is suffering from short term errors; Janet tells Michael the neighborhood could collapse from the errors' increasing severity.
| 20 | 7 | "Janet and Michael" | Dean Holland | Kate Gersten | October 26, 2017 | 207 | 3.97 |
Before beginning his experiment, Michael steals Janet from a warehouse and claims to be a Good Place architect; they build the neighborhood together. Now, Michael troubleshoots Janet while Vicky is distracted by torturing Chidi with needles. When Janet's manual suggests the glitches are caused by falsehoods, Michael blames himself for lying about the neighborhood's real purpose. But, when a glitch occurs while Janet is speaking to Tahani and Jason about their relationship, he realizes the problem is Janet's own subconscious lies – she is not really happy for the couple because she has retained her second incarnation's love for Jason. Janet advises Michael to activate her self-destruct mechanism, but he makes excuses and ultimately refuses because Janet is his friend. They solicit Eleanor's advice instead and Eleanor successfully talks Janet through processing her human emotions. Acting on Eleanor's recommendation of a rebound relationship, Janet creates a boyfriend named Derek whose mental state is infantile, excitable, and easily distracted.
| 21 | 8 | "Derek" | Jude Weng | Cord Jefferson | November 2, 2017 | 208 | 3.06 |
Michael fears Derek's existence will expose him. Michael sends Jason and Tahani on a private retreat and seeks Chidi and Eleanor's advice. Janet and Derek's relationship deteriorates. After Jason and Tahani ask Janet to marry them, Chidi acknowledges that the most ethical action is to inform the couple of Janet's issue, despite the double effect that Janet might eliminate Derek. Eleanor does so and, as Janet's friend, offers to help her work through her deep emotions over time. Janet deactivates Derek. Jason and Tahani remain intimate, but are unsure where they stand. Eleanor, having secretly repeatedly viewed Mindy's tape of herself and Chidi, shows it to him; he does not feel he loves her and she claims to feel the same way. Michael asks to speak with Eleanor about ethics; she tells him that striving to do right is emotionally rewarding and that his reaching out to her was human. Shawn comes to Michael's office.
| 22 | 9 | "Leap to Faith" | Linda Mendoza | Christopher Encell | January 4, 2018 | 209 | 3.08 |
Shawn congratulates Michael; Michael's falsified progress reports have earned them both promotions and the new torture plan will be widely implemented. Michael "reveals" to Eleanor, Chidi, Tahani, and Jason that they are in the Bad Place and announces the demons will destroy and abandon the neighborhood while the humans will be remanded to traditional torture the next day. The four consider exposing Michael to Shawn or fleeing to Mindy St. Claire's house, but Eleanor realizes Michael mentioned Kierkegaard as a cue for them to take a leap of faith with him and his cruel roast of them held a coded plan: First, Janet retrieves Derek so he can conduct a decoy train while the humans hide on the tracks underneath the train the demons intend to take out of town. Then, Michael frames Vicky for the humans' apparent escape. After the demons leave, Michael, Janet, and the humans are left alone, safe in the neighborhood. Mindy is delighted when a sexually willing Derek arrives at her house with cocaine.
| 23 | 10 | "Best Self" | Julie Anne Robinson | Tyler Straessle | January 11, 2018 | 210 | 3.11 |
Michael tells the humans they will travel to the Good Place in a hot-air balloon that challenges them to prove they are the best versions of their respective selves. They struggle to do so and Michael admits he is stalling because he was actually unable to determine a means to enter the Good Place, despite exploring over a billion options. Out of options, the group holds a party. Tahani ends her relationship with Jason. Eleanor admits she has feelings for Chidi, who describes his struggle to process his feelings and wishes he and Eleanor had met under normal circumstances. The humans name Michael an "honorary human", praising him for making more of an effort to do the right thing than a typical person. Tahani suggests they "demand to speak to a manager", but Michael says the Judge rarely hears cases and can only be reached through the Bad Place. Eleanor suggests they try and everyone agrees. Michael incapacitates the Bad Janet sent to transport him and Janet conducts everyone to the Bad Place on a train as the neighborhood disintegrates.
| 24 | 11 | "Rhonda, Diana, Jake, and Trent" | Alan Yang | Jen Statsky & Dan Schofield | January 18, 2018 | 211 | 3.00 |
Inside Bad Place headquarters, Michael works to obtain special badges that enable use of the Judge's portal. When a reception is unexpectedly held in the others' hiding place, the humans impersonate demons and Janet impersonates a Bad Janet. Chidi is unwilling to lie until Eleanor convinces him moral particularism permits it. Michael intends to use the humans' extradition paperwork as a cover, but Shawn (against regulations) sends commandos to Mindy's house and learns the humans are not there. Michael flees, stealing badges, and rejoins the humans at the reception, where a presentation about the neighborhood reveals the humans' identities. The five escape without Janet after Jason blocks Shawn's pursuit with a Molotov cocktail. Michael sends Tahani, Jason, and Chidi through the portal before discovering he is one badge short. He then gives his to Eleanor – determining self-sacrifice solves the trolley problem – and pushes a protesting Eleanor through the portal as Shawn arrives.
| 25 | 12 | "The Burrito" | Dean Holland | Megan Amram & Joe Mande | January 25, 2018 | 212 | 3.65 |
Michael confesses his lies to Shawn who, rather than retire him (which would make a spectacle that would publicize the scandal), decides to imprison him. The Bad Janet assisting Shawn reveals herself to be Michael's Janet; she incapacitates Shawn. The four humans arrive at the Judge's chambers. Eleanor reveals Michael's sacrifice. The Judge, Gen, agrees to hear out Eleanor, Chidi, Jason, and Tahani and tells them they must be subjected to separate tests of their personal growth. At their own request, they will share one fate and can only pass if all do individually. Jason fails a test of impulse control while Tahani fails when, instructed to ignore what others think of her, she maturely confronts her parents over their lifelong cruelty towards her. Eleanor is told that she and Chidi have passed while the others have failed; after Chidi tells her that it is ethical for them to go to the Good Place without Jason and Tahani, she correctly identifies "Chidi" as a construct and refuses the offer; Gen commends her. The real Chidi fails a test of decisiveness. Gen tells the foursome they have failed and Eleanor claims to have also failed personally. Before Gen can send them to the Bad Place, Michael and Janet arrive.
| 26 | 13 | "Somewhere Else" | Michael Schur | Michael Schur | February 1, 2018 | 213 | 3.19 |
Michael argues that the humans' postmortem self-improvement, which the immortal beings thought impossible, means the afterlife system is corrupt. Janet tells Jason she loves him, inspiring Chidi to kiss Eleanor. Gen offers to put each of the humans in their own separate Medium Places while she deliberates for up to a million years, but Eleanor refuses the proposal as unjust. Gen believes the humans only improved in pursuit of moral desert, but Michael believes they would have striven to improve, regardless, if encouraged. To test this, Michael rewinds time and saves all four humans from their original deaths, creating a new timeline in which their lives on Earth continue. Michael and Janet monitor the behavior of all four humans, who do not remember their time in the afterlife. Eleanor has an epiphany; she quits her immoral job to work as an environmentalist and tries to be ethical. After six months, Eleanor loses enthusiasm for environmentalism as her kindness has opened her to mistreatment by others; she reverts to her previous lifestyle for another six months. Michael, evading Gen's notice, appears to Eleanor as a bartender and questions her morality, leading her to watch Chidi's three-hour-long online lecture on "what we owe to each other," which enthralls her. Eleanor travels to Australia to meet Chidi, pleasing Michael.

== Critical reception ==
The second season received acclaim from critics. On Rotten Tomatoes, it has a rating of 100%, based on 58 reviews, with an average rating of 8.95/10. The site's summary states that "By voluntarily blowing up its premise, The Good Place sets up a second season that proves even funnier than its first." On Metacritic, the second season has a score of 87 out of 100, based on reviews from 10 critics, indicating "universal acclaim".

=== Television critics' top 10 lists ===
The Good Place ranked fifth on Metacritic's "Best of 2017: Television Critics' Top 10 Lists". The list is determined by giving a score to each show based on the number of times it appears in year-end top ten lists of various major TV critics and publications.

=== Accolades ===
For the 70th Primetime Emmy Awards, the series received two nominations–Ted Danson for Outstanding Lead Actor in a Comedy Series and Maya Rudolph for Outstanding Guest Actress in a Comedy Series. For the 34th TCA Awards, The Good Place won for Outstanding Achievement in Comedy, and received two other nominations–Program of the Year and Individual Achievement in Comedy for Ted Danson.

== Ratings ==
Viewership and ratings per episode of The Good Place season 2
| No. | Title | Air date | Rating/share (18–49) | Viewers (millions) | DVR (18–49) | DVR viewers (millions) | Total (18–49) | Total viewers (millions) |
|---|---|---|---|---|---|---|---|---|
| 1–2 | "Everything Is Great!" | September 20, 2017 | 1.3/5 | 5.28 | —N/a | —N/a | —N/a | —N/a |
| 3 | "Dance Dance Resolution" | September 28, 2017 | 1.4/5 | 4.67 | 0.8 | —N/a | 2.2 | —N/a |
| 4 | "Team Cockroach" | October 5, 2017 | 1.2/5 | 4.17 | 0.8 | —N/a | 2.0 | —N/a |
| 5 | "Existential Crisis" | October 12, 2017 | 1.2/5 | 4.05 | 0.8 | —N/a | 2.0 | —N/a |
| 6 | "The Trolley Problem" | October 19, 2017 | 1.1/4 | 3.92 | 0.8 | —N/a | 1.9 | —N/a |
| 7 | "Janet and Michael" | October 26, 2017 | 1.1/4 | 3.97 | 0.7 | —N/a | 1.8 | —N/a |
| 8 | "Derek" | November 2, 2017 | 1.0/4 | 3.06 | —N/a | —N/a | —N/a | —N/a |
| 9 | "Leap to Faith" | January 4, 2018 | 1.0/4 | 3.08 | 0.9 | 2.03 | 1.9 | 5.11 |
| 10 | "Best Self" | January 11, 2018 | 1.0/4 | 3.11 | 0.8 | 1.90 | 1.8 | 5.01 |
| 11 | "Rhonda, Diana, Jake, and Trent" | January 18, 2018 | 1.0/4 | 3.00 | 0.8 | 1.82 | 1.8 | 4.80 |
| 12 | "The Burrito" | January 25, 2018 | 1.1/4 | 3.65 | 0.8 | 1.82 | 1.9 | 5.47 |
| 13 | "Somewhere Else" | February 1, 2018 | 1.1/4 | 3.19 | 0.8 | 1.75 | 1.9 | 4.95 |
