= Fluidity =

Fluidity may refer to:

== In science ==
- Reciprocal of viscosity
- Cognitive fluidity
- Fluid intelligence
- Membrane fluidity
- Sexual fluidity

== Other ==
- Fluidity (video game)
