= Luke Guldan =

American model and actor

Luke Guldan is an American model and actor, best known for his role as Chris Baker in NBC's The Good Place, as well as Billy in the CBS All Access series Tell Me a Story.

== Early life ==
Guldan was born in Wisconsin and raised in Brooklyn, New York. Starting his career in competitive bodybuilding, Guldan later segued into acting.

== Career ==
Guldan appeared as the gym-obsessed Bad Place demon, Chris, in the NBC sitcom The Good Place. He later starred as Billy in the 2018 CBS All Access series Tell Me A Story. His additional TV credits include Broad City, Law & Order: Special Victims Unit, Blue Bloods, Gossip Girl, The Good Place, and The Colbert Report.

Guldan's 2019 film roles include Jim in Fluidity and Seth in The Creatress. He later played Paul in the 2021 film Final Frequency.

His stage appearances include a turn as Benjamin Braddock in “The Graduate”. He has also appeared in Tennessee Williams’ classic A Streetcar Named Desire and David Storey's “The Changing Room”.

A long-term proponent of health and fitness, Guldan appeared on the covers of Men’s Health, GQ, Men’s Fitness, Muscle & Fitness and Cosmopolitan. He was named the NABBA “Mr Teen Empire State” in 2004 and the INBF “Mr Fitness” in 2008 and 2009.

== Filmography ==
Film roles
Year	Title	Role	Notes
2012	The Watermen	Mike	
2017	ADDicted	Drew Dawson	
2017	Rockaway	Older Billy	
2018	The Broken Ones	Trent Kelly	
2018	The Creatress	Jim	
2019	Final Frequency	Paul Dahlset	

Television roles
Year	Title	Role	Notes
2013	Blue Bloods	Ralphie Vitale	Episode: "Growing Boys"
2014	Law & Order: Special Victims Unit	Bucky Dinucci	Episode: "Gridiron Soldier"
2014	Broad City	Tyler	Episode: "Stolen Phone"
2012–2017	Justice Woman	Kevin Murchinson	Recurring role; 18 episodes
2017–2019	The Good Place	Chris Baker	Recurring role; 6 episodes
2018	Tell Me a Story	Billy	Recurring role; 3 episodes
