= Todd May =

American political philosopher (born 1955)

- Born: Todd Gifford May; May 13, 1955 (age 71); New York City, U.S.

Education
- Education: Pennsylvania State University
- Thesis: Psychology, Knowledge, Politics: The Epistemic Grounds of Michel Foucault's Genealogy of Psychology (1989)
- Doctoral advisor: Alphonso Lingis

Philosophical work
- Era: Contemporary philosophy
- Region: Western philosophy
- School: Continental
- Institutions: Clemson University
- Main interests: Political philosophy
- Notable ideas: Post-structuralist anarchism

Todd Gifford May (born May 13, 1955) is an American political philosopher who writes on topics of anarchism, poststructuralism, and post-structuralist anarchism. More recently he has published books on existentialism and moral philosophy.

== Career ==
In 1989, May received a doctorate at Pennsylvania State University in continental philosophy. May has been teaching moral and political philosophy for over thirty years, beginning as a graduate instructor at Penn State before becoming a visiting assistant professor at the Indiana University of Pennsylvania. May taught at Clemson from 1991 to 2022, where he served as the Class of 1941 Memorial Professor of Philosophy. Since 2022, he has been a lecturer in philosophy at Warren Wilson College. May also teaches philosophy to incarcerated people.

Art academic Allan Antliff described May's 1994 The Political Philosophy of Poststructuralist Anarchism as "seminal," and he credited the book with introducing "post-structuralist anarchism," later abbreviated as "post-anarchism." May has published works on major poststructuralist philosophers, including Gilles Deleuze and Michel Foucault. He also wrote books on more general topics accessible to the general reader, including Death, Our Practices, Our Selves, or, What It Means to Be Human, Friendship in an Age of Economics: Resisting the Forces of Neoliberalism, A Significant Life: Human Meaning in a Silent Universe, A Fragile Life: Accepting Our Vulnerability.

May, along with Pamela Hieronymi, was a philosophical advisor to the NBC television show The Good Place. They both had cameos in the final episode.

== Personal life ==
May has three children, the youngest of whom majored in philosophy at university.

== Bibliography ==
- Between Genealogy and Epistemology (1993). University Park: Pennsylvania State University Press. ISBN 978-0-271-00905-6.
- The Political Philosophy of Poststructuralist Anarchism (1994). University Park: Pennsylvania State University Press. ISBN 978-0-271-01046-5.
- Reconsidering Difference (1997). University Park: Pennsylvania State University Press. ISBN 978-0-271-01658-0.
- Our Practices, Our Selves, or, What It Means to Be Human (2001). University Park: Pennsylvania State University Press. ISBN 978-0-271-02086-0.
- Operation Defensive Shield (2003). Sydney: Pluto Press. ISBN 978-0-7453-2063-2. Written in collaboration with Muna Hamzeh.
- The Moral Theory of Poststructuralism (2004). University Park: Pennsylvania State University Press. ISBN 978-0-271-02585-8.
- Gilles Deleuze (2005). Cambridge: Cambridge University Press. ISBN 978-0-521-84309-6.
- Philosophy of Foucault (2006). Montreal: McGill-Queen's University Press. ISBN 978-0-7735-3169-7.
- The Political Thought of Jacques Ranciere: Creating Equality (2008). Edinburgh: Edinburgh University Press. ISBN 978-0-7486-3586-3.
- Death (2008). Acumen Publishing. ISBN 1-84465-164-9.
- Friendship in an Age of Economics: Resisting the Forces of Neoliberalism (2014). New York: Lexington Books. ISBN 978-0-739-19284-9.
- A Significant Life: Human Meaning in a Silent Universe (2015). Chicago: University of Chicago Press. ISBN 978-0-226-23567-7.
- Nonviolent Resistance: A Philosophical Introduction (2015). Cambridge: Polity Books. ISBN 978-0-745-67118-5.
- A Fragile Life: Accepting Our Vulnerability (2017). Chicago: University of Chicago Press. ISBN 978-0-226-43995-2.
- A Decent Life: Morality for the Rest of Us (2019). Chicago: University of Chicago Press. ISBN 978-0-226-60974-4.
- Exploring the Philosophy of Death and Dying: Classical and Contemporary Perspectives, Chapter 21: Death, Mortality, and Meaning (December 31, 2020, 1st Edition). Publisher: Routledge.
- Should We Go Extinct?: A Philosophical Dilemma for Our Unbearable Times (2024). New York, Crown Publishing Group. ISBN 978-0-593-79872-0.
