= The Good Place season 1 =

The Good Place
- Season 1
- Region 1 DVD cover art
- Starring: Kristen Bell; William Jackson Harper; Jameela Jamil; D'Arcy Carden; Manny Jacinto; Ted Danson
- No. of episodes: 13

Release
- Original network: NBC
- Original release: September 19, 2016 – January 19, 2017

Season chronology
- Next → Season 2

The first season of the fantasy-comedy television series The Good Place, created by Michael Schur, aired between September 19, 2016, and January 19, 2017, on NBC in the United States. The season was produced by Fremulon, 3 Arts Entertainment, and Universal Television.

The series focuses on Eleanor Shellstrop (Kristen Bell), a recently deceased young woman who wakes up in the afterlife and is welcomed by Michael (Ted Danson) to "the Good Place", a heaven-like utopia he designed, in reward for her righteous life. Eleanor realizes that she was sent there by mistake, and hides her morally imperfect behavior (past and present). William Jackson Harper, Jameela Jamil, and Manny Jacinto co-star as other residents of the Good Place, together with D'Arcy Carden as an artificial being helping the inhabitants. Each of the episodes are listed as "Chapter (xx)" following the opening title sequence.

== Cast ==
=== Main ===
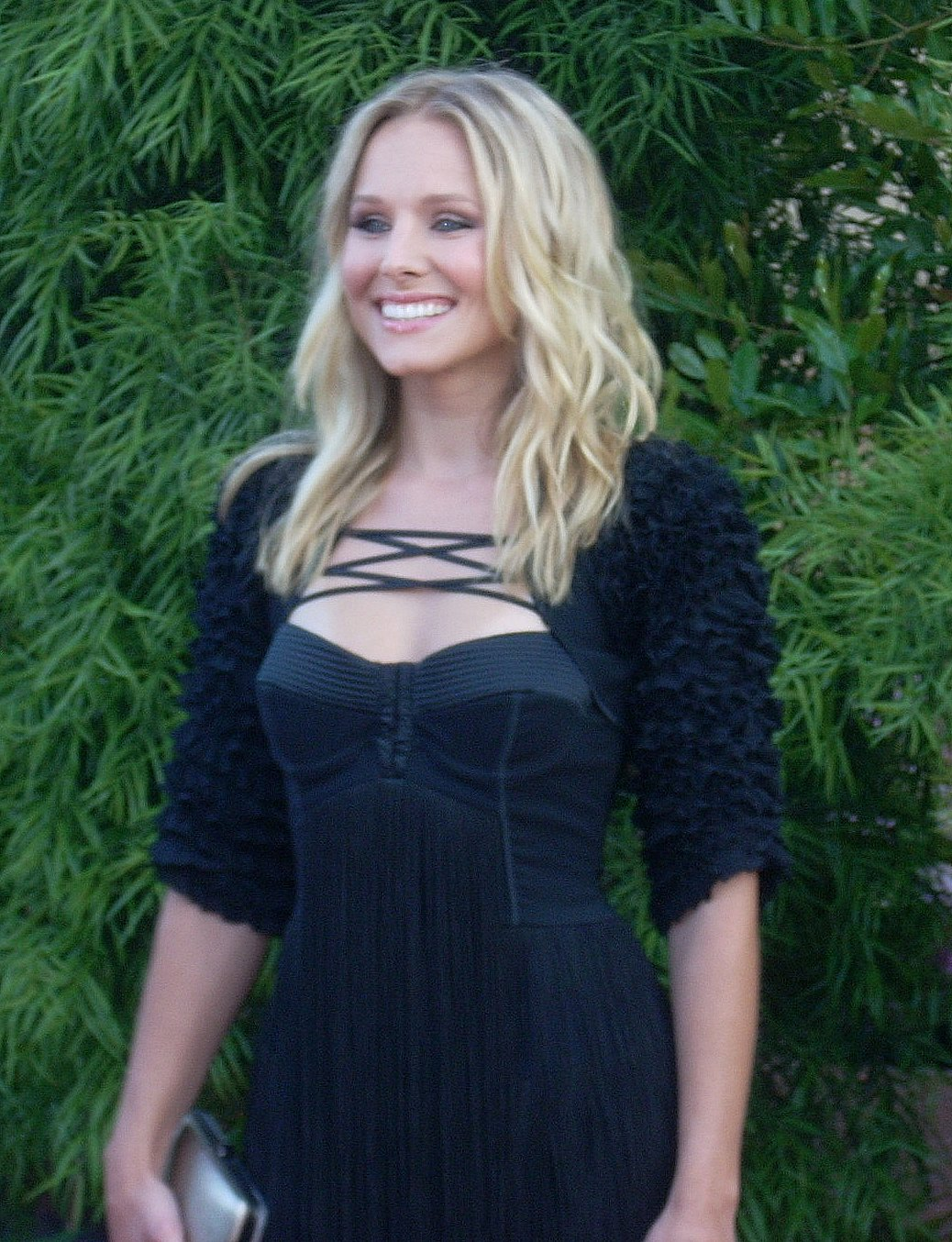
Kristen Bell portrays series protagonist Eleanor Shellstrop.

- Kristen Bell as Eleanor Shellstrop, a deceased, selfish saleswoman from Phoenix, Arizona who winds up in the Good Place by mistake. In order to earn her spot, she recruits Chidi to teach her the fundamentals of becoming a better person.
- William Jackson Harper as Chidi Anagonye, a deceased Nigerian-born Senegalese professor of ethics and moral philosophy. Chidi is assigned as Eleanor's soulmate in Michael's first Good Place experiment, and he gives her ethics lessons in an attempt to make her a better person.
- Jameela Jamil as Tahani Al-Jamil, a deceased, wealthy English philanthropist who believes she belongs in the Good Place. She forms an unlikely friendship with Eleanor, who initially dislikes her positive attitude, condescending way of speaking, and tendency to name drop.
- D'Arcy Carden as Janet, a programmed guide and knowledge bank who acts as the Good Place's main source of information and can provide its residents with whatever they desire
  - Carden also plays Bad Janet, a disrespectful version of Janet designed not to respond to residents properly
- Manny Jacinto as Jason Mendoza, a deceased amateur DJ and drug dealer from Jacksonville, Florida who winds up in the Good Place by mistake. He is introduced as Jianyu Li, a Taiwanese monk who took a vow of silence. Later, Jason proves to be an immature and unintelligent, but kindhearted Jacksonville Jaguars and Blake Bortles fan.
- Ted Danson as Michael, the architect who runs the Good Place neighborhood in which Eleanor, Chidi, Tahani, and Jason reside. Michael has a deep affinity for the mundane aspects of human life, like playing with paper clips or searching for one's car keys. "Michael" is a Hebrew name meaning "one who is like God".

=== Recurring ===
- Tiya Sircar is introduced as the "real Eleanor Shellstrop", a human rights lawyer mistakenly sent to the Bad Place in Eleanor's stead
- Adam Scott as Trevor, a cruel demon from the Bad Place who bullies the main group
- Marc Evan Jackson as Shawn, Michael's boss, introduced as an all powerful judge who is called in to help decide Eleanor's fate
- Maribeth Monroe as Mindy St. Claire, a deceased corporate lawyer and cocaine addict who just barely toed the line of earning enough Good Place points before her death and thus was awarded her own private Medium Place
- Eugene Cordero as Pillboi, Jason's best friend and partner in crime
- Rebecca Hazlewood as Kamilah Al-Jamil, Tahani's massively successful and competitive younger sister
- Josh Siegal as Glen, a bad place demon who acts as a Good Place resident. Siegal is a writer on the show and stepped into the part initially in the first season when the original actor was unable to secure a travel visa.

=== Guest ===
- Leslie Grossman as Donna Shellstrop, Eleanor's mother
- Tom Beyer as Doug Shellstrop, Eleanor's father
- Ajay Mehta as Waqas Al-Jamil, Tahani's father
- Anna Khaja as Manisha Al-Jamil, Tahani's mother

== Episodes ==
Season 1 episodes
No. overall	No. in season	Title	Directed by	Written by	Original release date	Prod. code	U.S. viewers (millions)
1	1	"Everything Is Fine"	Drew Goddard	Michael Schur	September 19, 2016	101	8.04
Eleanor Shellstrop wakes up in a afterlife utopia called the "Good Place", where she is welcomed by the neighborhood's architect Michael. All humans are assigned a numerical score based on the morality of their conduct in life, and only those with the very highest scores are sent to the Good Place (Heaven); all others experience an eternity of torture in the "Bad Place" (Hell). Michael praises Eleanor for being a lawyer who helped innocent people off death row, then escorts her to a home designed to her preferences where she can access memories from her life. She is also paired with a soulmate: Chidi, a Senegalese ethics professor. Eleanor tells Chidi that all of Michael's information about her is someone else's. Eleanor made a living by knowingly selling a worthless supplement to the sick and elderly and was crass and uncaring. Chidi has a moral crisis over whether or not to help Eleanor, who becomes frustrated and angry at a party hosted by her neighbors, soulmates Tahani and Jianyu. The next morning, the neighborhood is attacked by representations of elements from Eleanor's life and her misbehavior in the Good Place.
2	2	"Flying"	Michael McDonald	Alan Yang	September 19, 2016	102	8.04
Eleanor avoids suspicion in the aftermath of the chaos, while Michael fears he has failed in his first big project. Introducing Immanuel Kant's Metaphysics of Morals, Chidi considers teaching Eleanor to be a good person. Tahani organizes a clean up day, but anyone who volunteers will miss out on the opportunity to fly. Chidi suggests Eleanor volunteer in order to prove that she has the capacity for selflessness. She does, but she hides the trash to go flying after all, causing a trash storm to occur. Chidi loses faith in her and refuses to help. That night, Eleanor feels guilty and cleans the neighborhood herself. Chidi sees her and agrees to teach her to be good. A note is slipped under Eleanor's door, warning her that she does not belong in the Good Place. Flashbacks to Eleanor's life show that she habitually shirked the responsibility of acting as a designated driver.
3	3	"Tahani Al-Jamil"	Beth McCarthy-Miller	Aisha Muharrar	September 22, 2016	103	5.25
Eleanor suspects Tahani of writing the note but decides that she is genuinely good and begins to form a real friendship with her, comforting her over her dissatisfaction with Jianyu's vow of silence. Michael tries to get Chidi to take up a hobby, but Chidi only wants to work on his ethics manuscript. After Michael says that it is difficult to read, he agrees to become Chidi's advisor in rewriting it. Michael recruits Eleanor to help investigate the problems in the neighborhood. That night, Jianyu finally speaks aloud when he tells Eleanor that he wrote the note, and he also does not belong in the Good Place.
4	4	"Jason Mendoza"	Payman Benz	Joe Mande	September 29, 2016	104	4.45
Jianyu tells Eleanor he is really Jason Mendoza, a Filipino American drug dealer and an amateur DJ from Jacksonville, Florida who has gone along with the fiction of being a monk because the supposed vow of silence enables him to avoid detection. Jason decides to express his true identity, while Eleanor and a stunned Chidi try to convince him to stay hidden, fearing Eleanor will also be exposed. Tahani helps plan the gala opening of Patricia's restaurant. When Jason plans to share the real details of his life at the event, Eleanor creates a distraction by destroying Patricia's masterpiece cake, causing a sinkhole to open. Jason agrees to join Chidi's ethics class, but is an even less apt student than Eleanor. Tahani discovers that the sinkhole is growing, not closing as Michael expected. Flashbacks show that Jason Mendoza was hired as a famous electronic dance music DJ's stand-in and was rejected by the crowd when he played his own music. He tells a friend that he longs to be appreciated as his authentic self—and then vandalizes the DJ's boat.
5	5	"Category 55 Emergency Doomsday Crisis"	Morgan Sackett	Matt Murray	October 6, 2016	109	4.97
Eleanor is pleased that she is becoming more considerate of others and learning about John Stuart Mill's Utilitarianism, but Chidi is dissatisfied with spending all of his time teaching Eleanor. Michael protects the neighborhood from the sinkhole by quarantining all of the residents. He insists that Eleanor and Chidi host a couple who live near the sinkhole; the observant couple concludes that Chidi is hiding something. Chidi admits he never had a real relationship with a woman before; Eleanor realizes he is disappointed that she is not his true soulmate, and decides to be a better friend to him. Tahani reads Michael's private documents and learns that she has the second-lowest points score in the neighborhood. She tries to raise it by aiding Michael, who has to save her from the sinkhole; he tells her that scores do not change after death and that she should be satisfied to be one of the best people who ever lived. The sinkhole closes after Eleanor's kind gesture and Michael informs her that she must help him uncover the cause. Tahani's flashbacks show that she lived her entire life in the shadow of her sister, Kamilah, finally deciding to live independently after their parents' deaths.
6	6	"What We Owe to Each Other"	Tucker Gates	Dylan Morgan & Josh Siegal	October 13, 2016	105	4.23
Eleanor distracts Michael from his investigation in order to avoid detection. He tells her that architects do not normally live in neighborhoods; doing so was his own idea and will be discredited by his failure. Tahani tries to bond with Jianyu, forcing Chidi to go to great lengths to protect Jason's secret. Chidi and Tahani end up bonding, but Tahani ultimately accepts Jianyu as her soulmate after he gives her a gift that Chidi arranged. Michael concludes that he is the cause of the problems and announces his impending departure. In the past, Eleanor ditches house-sitting for a friend in order to attend a Rihanna concert, resulting in her friend's dog suffering a permanent disability.
7	7	"The Eternal Shriek"	Trent O'Donnell	Megan Amram	October 20, 2016	106	3.79
Michael announces that his "retirement" will consist of eternal torture. Only Janet can initiate the retirement, so rather than tell the truth, Eleanor decides to activate Janet's killswitch. She and Chidi argue over activating the switch; Chidi ends up pushing the button while trying to stop Jason from doing so. Chidi agrees to keep their secret, even though it will make him miserable. Tahani plans a somber retirement party for Michael. Janet is rebooted with no memories and operates at diminished capacity. Michael announces that he will remain in the neighborhood to investigate Janet's murder, which he says means there is a problem beyond himself. Eleanor admits to everyone that she is the problem because she was brought to the Good Place by mistake. In flashbacks, Chidi lies that he likes a coworker's unattractive boots; he obsesses over the lie for three years and finally confesses after the coworker survives a difficult surgery.
8	8	"Most Improved Player"	Tristram Shapeero	Dan Schofield	October 27, 2016	107	3.89
Michael interviews Eleanor, Chidi, Tahani, and Jason about Eleanor and Janet's death. After finally getting Eleanor's file from Janet (who is still re-learning things and had been only producing different types of cacti beforehand), he learns that Eleanor ruined a friend's dress, leading to a lawsuit that bankrupted innocent dry cleaners, public humiliation of the friend, and Eleanor's personal profit via t-shirts insulting her friend. This leads to Michael calling the Bad Place to come and take Eleanor. A train from the Bad Place arrives, bringing Trevor, a cruel and sleazy representative, to take Eleanor. After Chidi confesses that he killed Janet and that Eleanor is learning to be a better person, Michael and the others arrive at the train station to prevent Trevor from taking Eleanor. Trevor agrees to let the matter be discussed if he can continue to keep the other Eleanor Shellstrop, who was meant for the Good Place and is then led off the train.
9	9	"...Someone Like Me as a Member"	Dean Holland	Jen Statsky	November 3, 2016	108	3.68
As negotiations begin to determine the fates of the Eleanors, Michael uses Tahani's house as a meeting place only for the Bad Place demons to turn the event into a party where they walk all over Michael, much to Tahani's dismay. Chidi and the real Eleanor bond over dinner with Eleanor and Trevor. During the main negotiation session, Michael stands up to Trevor and his demons, declaring war on the Bad Place and promising to fight for Eleanor. Trevor promises to get Shawn, an "Eternal Judge", involved. Michael ultimately throws the demons out of the Good Place. That night, Jason finds Tahani in his "meditation room", demanding to know who he really is. In flashbacks, Eleanor is shown to dislike joining social groups.
10	10	"Chidi's Choice"	Linda Mendoza	Demi Adejuyigbe	January 5, 2017	110	3.53
While working together on Eleanor's defense case, Real Eleanor makes Eleanor realize she loves Chidi. Tahani confronts Jason and learns that Chidi inspired his kind gestures. Chidi panics when Eleanor and Tahani both tell him they love him. Michael successfully encourages Chidi to make a decision. Eleanor insists that she and Tahani preserve their friendship, so they spend the rest of the day together. Appreciating Janet's kindness towards him, Jason decides to marry her. Eleanor and Tahani attend the wedding and, when Chidi arrives, Eleanor tells him that her love for him is that of gratitude towards a friend and teacher and Tahani admits she was just on the rebound. Declaring that she has thought of a way for Eleanor to stay, Tahani leaves with her. Flashbacks show that a young Chidi wasted an entire recess period unable to pick teammates. Later in life, Chidi's indecisiveness made him unable to act as his best friend Uzo's best man and led to his death when an air conditioning unit, which he had knocked loose, fell on him while he stood below, unable to choose a bar to visit with Uzo.
11	11	"What's My Motivation"	Lynn Shelton	Andrew Law	January 12, 2017	111	3.64
Tahani suggests that Eleanor be allowed to accrue points in the Good Place; starting at −4,000, she must exceed 1,200,000. She performs good deeds and recreates Tahani's welcoming party, winning over her neighbors with humor, but her score only increases when she advises Chidi to respond favorably to Real Eleanor's declaration of love. Eleanor learns that, since her motivation is self-preservation, her actions will not increase her score. She secretly plans to leave the Good Place to become a good person, and her score reaches the target. Michael discovers both Jason's identity and his marriage to Janet, who has developed emotions and loves Jason, so Michael decides to reboot her. When Shawn's train arrives, Janet, Jason, and Eleanor hijack it to take them to a "Medium Place". Flashbacks show that Jason suffocated and died in a safe while trying to rob a restaurant with his friend Pillboi, who was placed on probation and not charged in his death.
12	12	"Mindy St. Claire"	Dean Holland	Megan Amram & Jen Statsky	January 19, 2017	112	3.93
Eleanor, Jason, and Janet escape to a "Medium Place" inhabited by Mindy St. Claire (Maribeth Monroe), a 1980s attorney who overall led a selfish life, but whose actions just prior to her death led to the formation of a massive global charity fund. Shawn proceeds with his trial on Eleanor and Jason, with Chidi, Tahani, Michael, and real Eleanor trying to argue in Eleanor's favor. Ultimately, Shawn judges against Eleanor and Jason, decreeing that, if the two do not return, Chidi and Tahani will be sentenced to go to the Bad Place in their stead. Eleanor eventually convinces Jason and Janet to return in order to spare Chidi and Tahani from that fate. When they make it back to the Good Place, they have just missed Shawn's deadline by a matter of seconds. Shawn decides that they can choose any two of the four to go to the Bad Place. Flashbacks show the day of Eleanor's death, the day Eleanor was emancipated from her parents, and various other moments in Eleanor's life.
13	13	"Michael's Gambit"	Michael Schur	Michael Schur	January 19, 2017	113	3.93
Following Shawn's decision, the group argues about who should go to the Bad Place and who should stay, with Real Eleanor deciding to take one place. As their arguments become more heated and frustrating, Eleanor has an epiphany: the four of them have been torturing each other not by accident but by design, meaning they have been in the Bad Place (Hell) all along. Michael, in truth a demon, confesses that this "Good Place" is a new and elaborate Bad Place neighborhood where Eleanor, Jason, Chidi, and Tahani, the only human inhabitants, were to drive each other to agony; every other "neighbor" was a demon acting as part of the plan. Michael explains Janet is a legitimate Good Place Janet he stole to run his fake Good Place. Flashbacks show Michael at his architect job before he created his false "Good Place" and his pitch meeting with Shawn, in actuality his boss, having pitched his plan as able to last 1,000 years. With his scheme exposed, Michael begs Shawn for a second attempt by blanking their memories and changing some parameters. In a last ditch effort to do something, Eleanor rips a page from T. M. Scanlon's Contractualism and writes a message to herself which she hides in Janet's mouth. After the reset, Janet gives Eleanor the piece of paper that reads "Eleanor – Find Chidi".

== Critical reception ==
The first season of The Good Place received positive reviews from television critics. On Rotten Tomatoes, the first season has a rating of 92%, based on 71 reviews, with an average rating of 7.74/10. The site's critical consensus reads, "Kristen Bell and Ted Danson knock it out of the park with supremely entertaining, charming performances in this absurd, clever and whimsical portrayal of the afterlife." On Metacritic, the first season has a score of 78 out of 100, based on reviews from 32 critics, indicating "generally favorable" reviews.

=== Critics' top 10 lists ===
2016
- No. 4 – Las Vegas Weekly
- No. 5 – Lincoln Journal Star
- No. 7 – TV Guide
- No. 7 – San Francisco Chronicle
- No. 8 – Entertainment Weekly
- No. 8 – Pittsburgh Post-Gazette
- No. 8 – Vulture
- No. 9 – People
- No. 9 – The Village Voice
- No. 10 – The A.V. Club
- No. 10 – Omaha World-Herald
- No. 10 – Vox
- No. 10 – Reason (tie)
- Unranked – Los Angeles Times

== Ratings ==
Viewership and ratings per episode of The Good Place season 1
No.	Title	Air date	Rating/share (18–49)	Viewers (millions)	DVR (18–49)	DVR viewers (millions)	Total (18–49)	Total viewers (millions)
1	"Everything Is Fine"	September 19, 2016	2.3/8	8.04	1.2	3.65	3.5	11.69
2	"Flying"	September 19, 2016	2.3/8	8.04	1.2	3.65	3.5	11.69
3	"Tahani Al-Jamil"	September 22, 2016	1.4/5	5.25	—N/a	2.39	—N/a	7.64
4	"Jason Mendoza"	September 29, 2016	1.3/5	4.45	0.8	2.24	2.1	6.68
5	"Category 55 Emergency Doomsday Crisis"	October 6, 2016	1.4/5	4.97	0.8	2.01	2.2	6.98
6	"What We Owe to Each Other"	October 13, 2016	1.2/5	4.23	0.8	—N/a	2.0	—N/a
7	"The Eternal Shriek"	October 20, 2016	1.0/4	3.79	0.8	2.02	1.8	5.80
8	"Most Improved Player"	October 27, 2016	1.2/4	3.89	0.7	—N/a	1.9	—N/a
9	"...Someone Like Me as a Member"	November 3, 2016	1.2/5	3.68	0.6	—N/a	1.8	—N/a
10	"Chidi's Choice"	January 5, 2017	1.0/4	3.53	0.7	1.61	1.7	5.14
11	"What's My Motivation"	January 12, 2017	1.1/4	3.64	0.7	1.71	1.8	5.35
12	"Mindy St. Claire"	January 19, 2017	1.1/4	3.93	0.7	—N/a	1.8	—N/a
13	"Michael's Gambit"	January 19, 2017	1.1/4	3.93	0.7	—N/a	1.8	—N/a
