= Pamela Hieronymi =

American philosopher

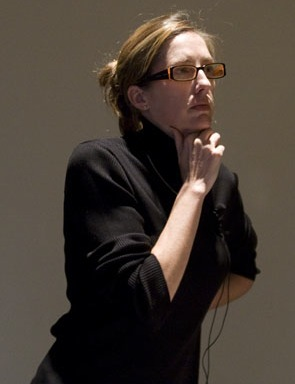

Education
- Education: Princeton University; Harvard University

Philosophical work
- Era: Contemporary philosophy
- Region: Western philosophy
- School: Analytic
- Institutions: Stanford University; University of California, Los Angeles
- Main interests: Moral psychology, moral responsibility, agency

Pamela Hieronymi (/haɪˈrɒnɪmi/) is an American philosopher who is professor of philosophy at the University of California, Los Angeles. She is mainly known for her work in moral psychology.

== Education and career ==
Hieronymi earned her A.B. from Princeton University in 1992 and earned her Ph.D. from Harvard University in 2000. She has worked at UCLA since July 2000, where she was awarded tenure in 2007. She has presented her research widely, both nationally and internationally. In addition, she has appeared on Philosophy Talk public radio and her thoughts on technology and teaching were published by the Chronicle of Higher Education.

In 2010 she won the Frederick Burkhardt Residential Fellowship for Recently Tenured Scholars from the American Council of Learned Societies. She spent the 2011–2012 academic year as a Fellow at the Center for Advanced Study in the Behavioral Sciences at Stanford University.

== Philosophical work ==
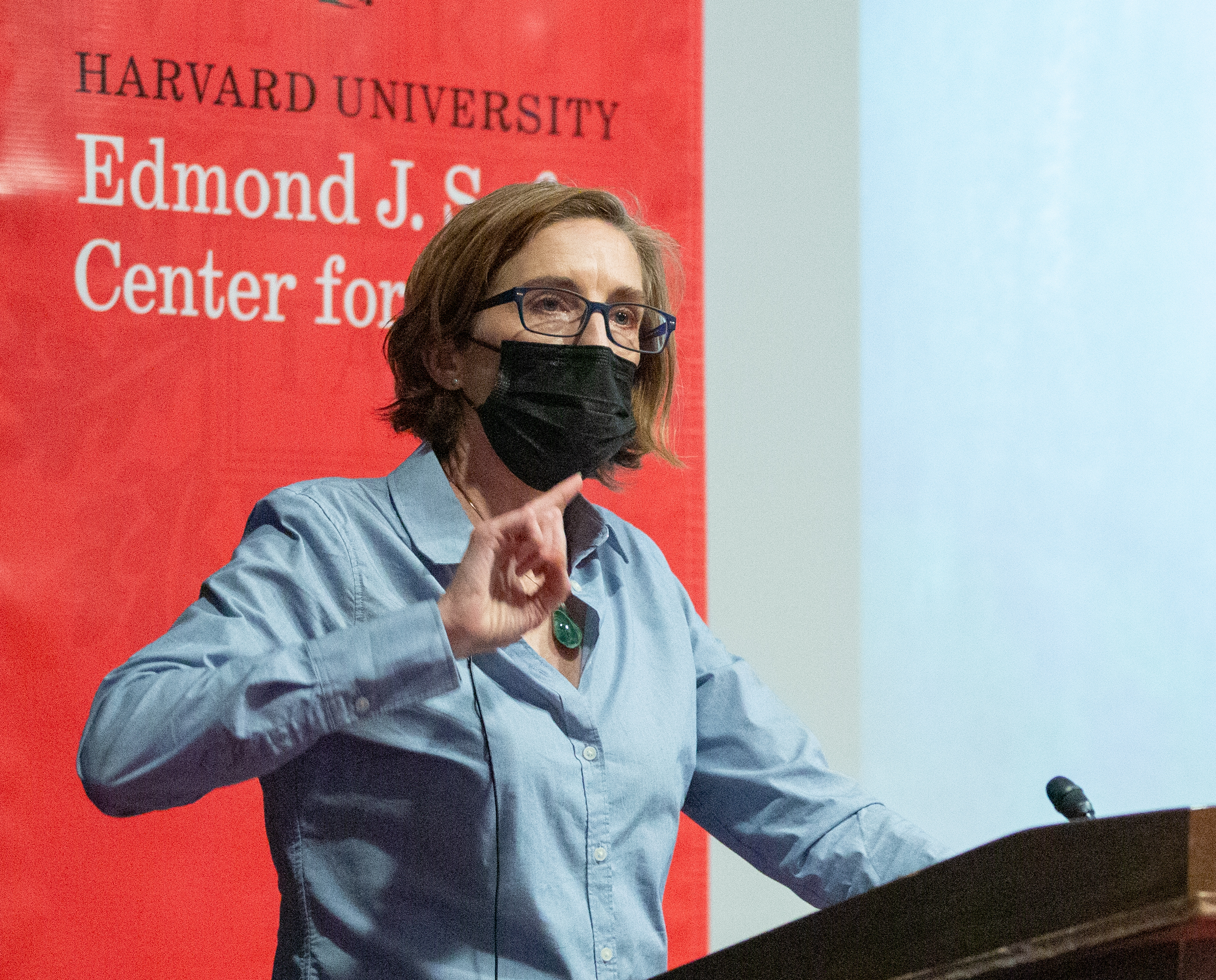
Delivering the Kissel Lecture in Ethics in 2022

An expert in moral psychology, Hieronymi has written widely on issues about responsibility and agency, as well as on reasons, trust, forgiveness, and the voluntariness of belief. The work has been influential and widely cited.

== Media consulting ==
Hieronymi served as an advisor on moral philosophy and ethics for the popular NBC sitcom The Good Place, and subsequently became a "consulting philosopher" for the show; "surely a first in sitcom history." Hieronymi guided the show to feature the work of her dissertation advisor, Harvard emeritus professor T. M. Scanlon, and also advised the writers on "existentialism and the famous thought experiment known as the Trolley Problem," among other topics. In the final episode, she appeared as a cameo alongside political philosopher Todd May.

== Selected articles ==
- "Reflection and Responsibility," Philosophy and Public Affairs 42, no 1 (Winter 2014): 3–41.
- "forgiveness, blame, reasons…" Interview with Richard Marshall. 3:am magazine, October 25, 2013, http://www.3ammagazine.com/3am/forgiveness-blame-reasons/
- "The Use of Reasons in Thought (and the use of earmarks in arguments)," Ethics 124, no. 1 (October 2013): 114–27.
- "Don't Confuse Technology with Teaching," Chronicle of Higher Education 63, no. 44 (August 13, 2012): A19 and at http://chronicle.com/article/Dont-Confuse-Technology-With/133551/
- "Reasons for Action," Proceedings of the Aristotelian Society 111 (2011): 407–27.
- "Believing at Will," Canadian Journal of Philosophy Supplementary Volume 35 (2009): 149–187.
- "Of Metaphysics and Motivation: The Appeal of Contractualism," Reasons and Recognition: Essays on the Philosophy of T. M. Scanlon, R. Jay Wallace, Rahul Kumar, and Samuel Freeman, eds. (New York: Oxford University Press, 2011): 101–128.
- "Two Kinds of Agency," Mental Actions, Lucy O'Brien and Matthew Soteriou, eds. (Oxford: Oxford University Press: 2009): 138–62.
- "The Reasons of Trust," The Australasian Journal of Philosophy 86, no. 2 (June 2008): 213–36.
- "Controlling Attitudes," Pacific Philosophical Quarterly 87, no. 1 (March 2006): 45–74.
- "The Wrong Kind of Reason," The Journal of Philosophy 102, no. 9 (September 2005): 437–57.
- "The Force and Fairness of Blame," Philosophical Perspectives 18, no. 1 (2004): 115–48.
- "Articulating an Uncompromising Forgiveness," Philosophy and Phenomenological Research 62, no. 3 (May 2001): 529–55.
