= Manny Jacinto =

Canadian actor (born 1987)

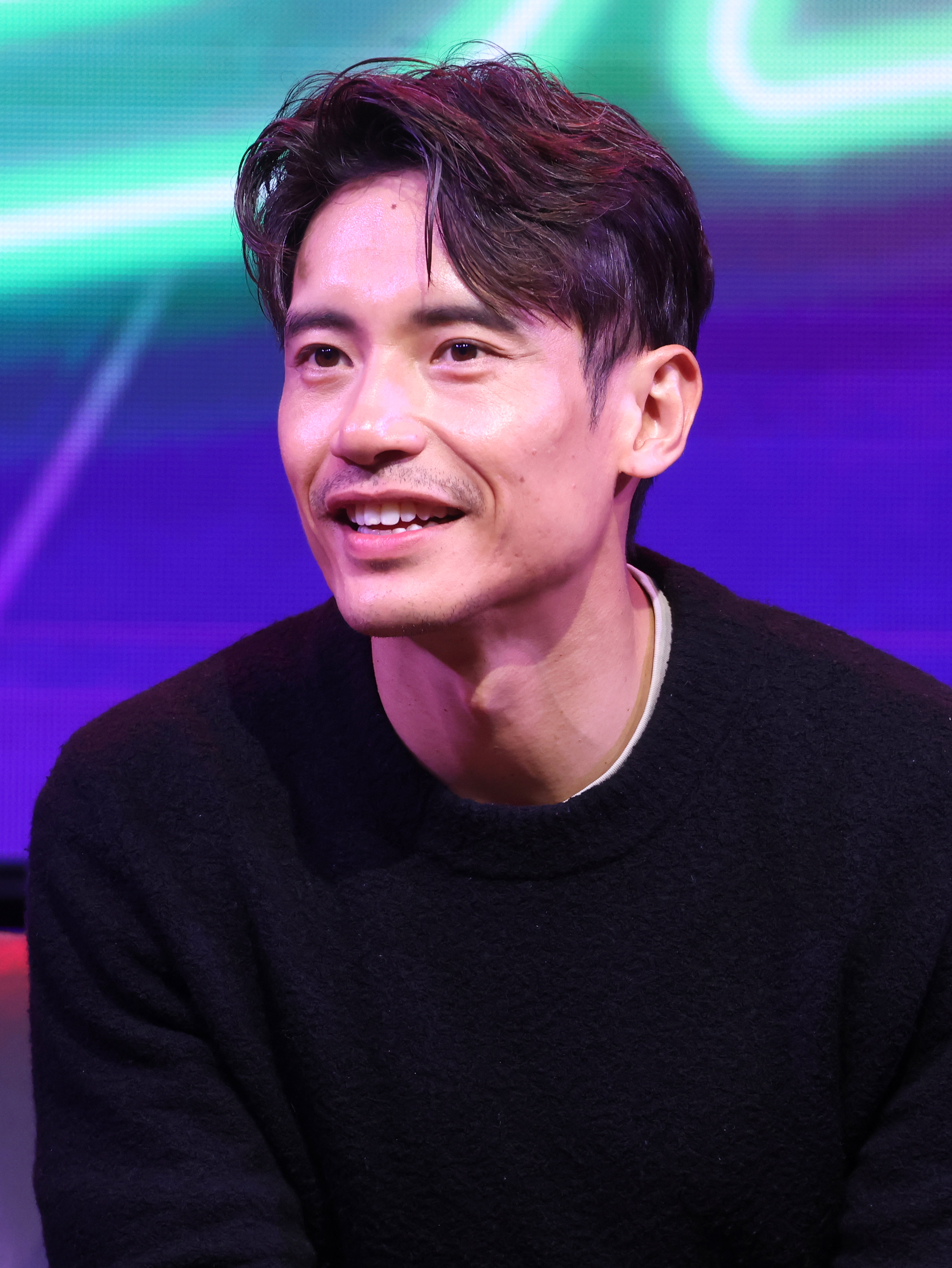
- Jacinto at the 2025 Phoenix Fan Fusion
- Born: Manuel Luis Jacinto; August 19, 1987 (age 39); Manila, Philippines
- Education: University of British Columbia
- Occupation: Actor
- Years active: 2012–present
- Spouse: Dianne Doan (m. 2021)

Manuel Luis Jacinto (/dʒəˈsɪntoʊ/ jə-SIN-toh or /həˈsɪntoʊ/ hə-SIN-toh, Filipino: [haˈsɪnto]; born August 19, 1987) is a Canadian actor. After several small roles on television, his breakout role came as Jason Mendoza on the NBC sitcom The Good Place (2016–2020). Jacinto had minor roles in Bad Times at the El Royale (2018) and Top Gun: Maverick (2022), and portrayed the Stranger/"Qimir" in the Star Wars series The Acolyte (2024). He also provided the voice of Scott Denoga in the Disney Channel animated series Hailey's On It! (2023–2024). In 2025, Jacinto starred in Disney's Freakier Friday alongside Lindsay Lohan and Jamie Lee Curtis.

In 2026, Jacinto stars alongside Liza Soberano in two animated projects from Filipino filmmakers: the film Forgotten Island, and the web series Sun Chaser.

== Early life ==
Jacinto was born on August 19, 1987, in Manila, Philippines, and is of Filipino-Chinese descent. His family emigrated to Canada in 1990, when he was about three years old. He was raised in Richmond, British Columbia. He grew up playing baseball and basketball, and attended Vancouver College, an all-boys Catholic high school.

He earned a bachelor's degree in civil engineering at the University of British Columbia.

== Career ==
While interning, Jacinto participated in hip-hop dance competitions before deciding on acting as a career. He became frustrated by the lack of prominent Asian actors in Vancouver's film community and moved to Los Angeles. After small roles in series including Once Upon a Time, Supernatural, and iZombie; he was cast in 2015 as triad leader Wing Lei in the Canadian spy drama The Romeo Section by Chris Haddock. The role won him a Leo Award nomination for Best Supporting Performance in a Dramatic Series. In 2016, Jacinto was cast as Jason Mendoza in the NBC comedy The Good Place. He received favourable reviews for his performance as Mendoza, an EDM-obsessed "lovable doofus" from Jacksonville, Florida, going against stereotypes of how Asian men are often portrayed in Hollywood.

In September 2018, Jacinto was cast in the Top Gun sequel Top Gun: Maverick, starring Tom Cruise. In November 2019, it was announced that Jacinto would have a main role on the Netflix horror drama miniseries Brand New Cherry Flavor. It was released on August 13, 2021. In November 2021, it was announced that Jacinto would voice Scott in the animated comedy-adventure series Hailey's On It!, which premiered in June 2023 on Disney Channel. In 2022, Jacinto voiced Lucan in the eight-episode sci-fi podcast Marigold Breach, alongside his Good Place co-star Jameela Jamil. He portrayed Qimir in 2024's The Acolyte.

In 2026, Jacinto will star in two upcoming animated projects written and directed by Filipino filmmakers: the DreamWorks Animation film Forgotten Island and the Filipino web series Sun Chaser, both of which will also star Liza Soberano.

== Personal life ==
In November 2019, Jacinto announced that he was engaged to Descendants actress Dianne Doan, whom he had met while they were both performing as dancers. They married in 2021. He currently lives in Los Angeles.

== Filmography ==
Key
| † | Denotes works that have not yet been released |

=== Film ===
| Year | Title | Role | Notes | Ref. |
|---|---|---|---|---|
| 2012 | Broken Sword: Shadow of the Blade | Kenji | Short film | |
| 2013 | Tele | Tommy | Short film | |
| 2013 | John Apple Jack | Street Kid | | |
| 2013 | #Fix | Adam | Short film | |
| 2015 | Dead Rising: Watchtower | Desk Soldier | | |
| 2015 | Even Lambs Have Teeth | Vince | | |
| 2015 | Brittney Grabill: Goodnight | Dan | Short film | |
| 2016 | Peelers | Travis | | |
| 2017 | Chocolate Cake | Tim | Short film | |
| 2018 | Bad Times at the El Royale | Waring 'Wade' Espiritu | | |
| 2022 | Belle | Shinobu "Shinobu-kun" Hisatake (voice) | English dub | |
| 2022 | I Want You Back | Logan | | |
| 2022 | Top Gun: Maverick | Lieutenant Billy "Fritz" Avalone | | |
| 2022 | Mortal Kombat Legends: Snow Blind | Kenshi (voice) | | |
| 2023 | Cora Bora | Tom | | |
| 2024 | The Knife | Officer Padilla | | |
| 2024 | Balestra | Elliot | | |
| 2025 | Freakier Friday | Eric Reyes | | |
| 2026 | Forgotten Island | Bungi (Voice) | | |
| 2026 | Love Language | Warren | | |
| TBA | The Stalemate † | TBA | Filming | |

=== Television ===
| Year | Title | Role | Notes | Ref. |
|---|---|---|---|---|
| 2013 | Once Upon a Time | Quon | Episode: "Selfless, Brave and True" | |
| 2013 | Supernatural | Diego | Episode: "Pac-Man Fever" | |
| 2013 | Untold Stories of the E.R. | Security Guard | Episode: "Down for the Count" | |
| 2014 | The 100 | Boy #1 / Boy Bullied by Murphy | 2 episodes | |
| 2014 | Rogue | Bellhop | Episode: "Oh Sarah" | |
| 2014 | Lighthouse | Sexy Guy Dancing | Television film | |
| 2014 | Rush | P.A. | Episode: "Because I Got High" | |
| 2014 | The Unauthorized Saved by the Bell Story | Eric | Television film | |
| 2014 | Paper Angels | Jamie Lang | Television film | |
| 2014 | Only Human | Kevin | Television film | |
| 2015 | Bates Motel | Loner Guy | Episode: "Unbreak-Able" | |
| 2015 | iZombie | Sammy | Episode: "Liv and Let Clive" | |
| 2015 | Backstrom | Tattooed Punk | Episode: "Corkscrewed" | |
| 2015 | Wayward Pines | Lab Assistant | Episode: "Choices" | |
| 2015 | The Romeo Section | Wing Lei | 10 episodes | |
| 2016 | Roadies | Runner | Episode: "Life Is a Carnival" | |
| 2016–2020 | The Good Place | Jason Mendoza | Main role | |
| 2017 | The Good Doctor | Bobby Ato | Episode: "Sacrifice" | |
| 2020 | Magical Girl Friendship Squad | Coffee Dude | Voice role; 2 episodes | |
| 2021 | Trese | Maliksi | English dub | |
| 2021 | Brand New Cherry Flavor | Code | Main role | |
| 2021 | Nine Perfect Strangers | Yao | Main role (season 1) | |
| 2023–2024 | Hailey's On It! | Scott Denoga | Voice role; main role | |
| 2024–2025 | Moon Girl and Devil Dinosaur | Brian Glory / Blue Streak | Voice role; 3 episodes | |
| 2024–2025 | Chibiverse | Scott Denoga | Voice role; 3 episodes | |
| 2024 | Hailey Banks' Disney Mini Movie Marathon | Scott Denoga | Voice role; television special | |
| 2024 | The Acolyte | Qimir / The Stranger | Main role | |
| 2025 | Adventure Time: Fionna and Cake | DJ Flame | Voice role; 7 episodes | |
| 2025 | Prep & Landing: The Snowball Protocol | Renato | Voice role; television special | |
| TBA | Fallout † | TBA | Recurring role (season 3) | |

=== Web ===
| Year | Title | Role | Notes | Ref. |
|---|---|---|---|---|
| 2023 | Theme Song Takeover | Scott Denoga (voice) | 3 episodes | |
| 2023 | Broken Karaoke | Scott Denoga (voice) | 1 episode | |
| 2024 | Hailey's On It!: Road Trip | Scott Denoga (voice) | Short animated series | |
| 2026 | Sun Chaser † | Jordan Santos | Animated series; lead role | |

=== Audio ===
| Year | Title | Role | Notes |
|---|---|---|---|
| 2025 | Hyperdrive | Kai | Main role |

== Awards and nominations ==
| Year | Association | Category | Work | Result | Ref. |
|---|---|---|---|---|---|
| 2016 | Leo Awards | Best Supporting Performance by a Male in a Dramatic Series | The Romeo Section | Nominated | |
| 2018 | Gold Derby Awards | Ensemble of the Year | The Good Place | Nominated | |
| 2025 | Canadian Screen Awards | Radius Award | Himself | Honored | |
