= 60th Tony Awards =

2006 US theatrical awards ceremony

- Official poster for the 60th annual Tony Awards
- Date: June 11, 2006
- Location: Radio City Music Hall, New York City, New York
- Hosted by: none

Highlights
- Most wins: The History Boys (6)
- Most nominations: The Drowsy Chaperone (13)
- Website: tonyawards.com

Television/radio coverage
- Network: CBS
- Viewership: 7.7 million
- Produced by: Ricky Kirshner; Glenn Weiss
- Directed by: Glenn Weiss

The 60th Annual Tony Awards were held at Radio City Music Hall on June 11, 2006. The award ceremony was broadcast live on the CBS television network in the United States. The 2006 Tony Awards did not feature a host, but instead over 60 stars presented awards at the ceremony.

The biggest winner of the night was the Royal National Theatre production The History Boys by British playwright Alan Bennett winning six Tonys out of seven nominations, including Best Play, Best Direction, Best Leading Actor and Best Featured Actress.

Natasha Richardson, Phylicia Rashad and Liev Schreiber announced the nominations on May 16, 2006.

The Antoinette Perry Awards for Excellence in Theatre, more commonly known as the Tony Awards, recognize achievement in live American theatre and are presented by the American Theatre Wing and the League of American Theatres and Producers (now called The Broadway League) at an annual ceremony in New York City. The awards are for Broadway productions and performances plus several non-competitive Special Awards (such as the Regional Theatre Award).

== Eligibility ==
Shows that opened on Broadway during the 2005–06 season before May 11, 2006 are eligible.

Original plays

- After the Night and the Music
- Bridge and Tunnel
- Festen
- The History Boys
- Latinologues
- The Lieutenant of Inishmore
- A Naked Girl on the Appian Way
- Primo
- Rabbit Hole
- Shining City
- Souvenir
- Well

Original musicals

- Chita Rivera: The Dancer's Life
- The Color Purple
- The Drowsy Chaperone
- Hot Feet
- In My Life
- Jersey Boys
- Lennon
- Lestat
- Ring of Fire
- Tarzan
- The Wedding Singer
- The Woman in White

Play revivals

- Absurd Person Singular
- Awake and Sing!
- Barefoot in the Park
- The Caine Mutiny Court-Martial
- The Constant Wife
- Faith Healer
- Mark Twain Tonight!
- The Odd Couple
- Seascape
- Three Days of Rain
- A Touch of the Poet

Musical revivals

- The Pajama Game
- Sweeney Todd: The Demon Barber of Fleet Street
- The Threepenny Opera

== The ceremony ==
Harry Connick Jr. opened the show singing three popular songs from three Broadway musicals. Connick, (who was heavily medicated to be able to perform, because of a ruptured disc in his spine,), was also a nominee and a performer with the cast of The Pajama Game. All of the sixty presenters and co-hosts joined the stage during the third song. Connick performed "Tonight" (from West Side Story), "Give My Regards to Broadway" (from Little Johnny Jones), and "There's No Business Like Show Business" (from Annie Get Your Gun).

=== Performances ===
==== New Musicals ====
- The Color Purple: Felicia P. Fields, La Chanze and the company performed "Hell No!" and the reprise of the title song.
- The Drowsy Chaperone: Sutton Foster and Bob Martin performed "Show Off" with the ensemble.
- Jersey Boys: John Lloyd Young performed "Can't Take My Eyes Off of You" and was joined by Christian Hoff, Daniel Reichard and J. Robert Spencer to perform "Who Loves You?".
- The Wedding Singer: Stephen Lynch and the company performed "It's Your Wedding Day".

==== Revivals ====
- The Pajama Game: Harry Connick Jr. and Kelli O'Hara performed "There Once Was a Man". Harry Connick, Jr. and Megan Lawrence with ensemble performed "Hernando's Hideaway".
- Sweeney Todd: The company, including Manoel Felciano, Michael Cerveris and Patti LuPone performed a medley of "The Ballad of Sweeney Todd", "The Worst Pies in London", "My Friends" and "The Ballad of Sweeney Todd (reprise)"
- The Threepenny Opera: Alan Cumming and Cyndi Lauper with the ensemble performed "The Ballad of the Pimp."

=== Presenters ===
Source: tonyawards.com

- Lauren Ambrose
- Julie Andrews
- Hank Azaria
- Harry Belafonte
- Kristen Bell
- Norbert Leo Butz
- Victoria Clark
- Glenn Close
- Harry Connick, Jr.
- Barbara Cook
- Jim Dale
- Christine Ebersole
- Ralph Fiennes
- Harvey Fierstein
- Ana Gasteyer
- Joanna Gleason
- Marcia Gay Harden
- Neil Patrick Harris
- Hal Holbrook
- Bill Irwin
- James Earl Jones
- T. R. Knight
- Frank Langella
- Josh Lucas
- Julianna Margulies
- Eric McCormack
- Audra McDonald
- Michael McKean
- S. Epatha Merkerson
- Brian Stokes Mitchell
- James Naughton
- Patricia Neal
- Bebe Neuwirth
- Cynthia Nixon
- Janis Paige
- Anna Paquin
- Rosie Perez
- Joe Pesci
- Bernadette Peters
- David Hyde Pierce
- Oliver Platt
- Jonathan Pryce
- Sara Ramirez
- Molly Ringwald
- Chita Rivera
- Paul Rudd
- Mark Ruffalo
- Julia Roberts
- Liev Schreiber
- Kyra Sedgwick
- Paul Shaffer
- Martin Short
- Tom Skerritt
- Jamie-Lynn Sigler
- John Tartaglia
- Richard Thomas
- Stanley Tucci
- Rita Wilson
- Oprah Winfrey
- Alfre Woodard

== New category ==
Beginning with the 2006 awards, an additional category was added on a trial basis for the 2005–2006, 2006–2007 and 2007–2008 seasons: Best Recreation of a Leading Role by an Actor/Actress. This category was intended to honor actors and actresses who were cast as replacements and joined a long-running show after its official opening, and would not have otherwise had the chance to be recognized for a potentially Tony-worthy performance. This award may or may not have been given in any particular year. Shows were to submit replacements they deemed worthy of consideration and a twenty-four-member committee, The Tony Awards Administration Committee, were to attend the shows and evaluate the performances.

No award was given in 2006, because neither of the two performers nominated, Jonathan Pryce and Harvey Fierstein, received the necessary sixteen votes for a win.

Following the 2006 Tony Awards, the Administration Committee voted unanimously to abandon the category.

== Winners and nominees ==
Sources:PlaybillNew York Times

Winners are in bold

Best Play	Best Musical
**The History Boys – Alan Bennett**; The Lieutenant of Inishmore – Martin McDonagh; Rabbit Hole – David Lindsay-Abaire; Shining City – Conor McPherson	**Jersey Boys**; The Color Purple; The Drowsy Chaperone; The Wedding Singer
Best Revival of a Play	Best Revival of a Musical
**Awake and Sing!**; The Constant Wife; Faith Healer; Seascape	**The Pajama Game**; Sweeney Todd; The Threepenny Opera
Best Performance by a Leading Actor in a Play	Best Performance by a Leading Actress in a Play
**Richard Griffiths – The History Boys as Hector**; Ralph Fiennes – Faith Healer as Francis Hardy; Željko Ivanek – The Caine Mutiny Court-Martial as Lt. Com. Phillip Francis Queeg; Oliver Platt – Shining City as John; David Wilmot – The Lieutenant of Inishmore as Padraic	**Cynthia Nixon – Rabbit Hole as Becca Corbett**; Kate Burton – The Constant Wife as Constance Culver Middleton; Judy Kaye – Souvenir as Florence Foster Jenkins; Lisa Kron – Well as Lisa Kron; Lynn Redgrave – The Constant Wife as Mrs. Culver
Best Performance by a Leading Actor in a Musical	Best Performance by a Leading Actress in a Musical
**John Lloyd Young – Jersey Boys as Frankie Valli**; Michael Cerveris – Sweeney Todd as Sweeney Todd; Harry Connick Jr. – The Pajama Game as Sid Sorokin; Stephen Lynch – The Wedding Singer as Robbie Hart; Bob Martin – The Drowsy Chaperone as Man in Chair	**LaChanze – The Color Purple as Celie Harris Johnson**; Sutton Foster – The Drowsy Chaperone as Janet Van De Graaff; Patti LuPone – Sweeney Todd as Mrs. Lovett; Kelli O'Hara – The Pajama Game as Catherine 'Babe' Williams; Chita Rivera – Chita Rivera: The Dancer's Life as Herself
Best Performance by a Featured Actor in a Play	Best Performance by a Featured Actress in a Play
**Ian McDiarmid – Faith Healer as Teddy**; Samuel Barnett – The History Boys as Posner; Domhnall Gleeson – The Lieutenant of Inishmore as Davey; Mark Ruffalo – Awake and Sing! as Moe Axelrod; Pablo Schreiber – Awake and Sing! as Ralph Berger	**Frances de la Tour – The History Boys as Mrs. Lintott**; Tyne Daly – Rabbit Hole as Nat; Jayne Houdyshell – Well as Ann; Alison Pill – The Lieutenant of Inishmore as Mairead; Zoë Wanamaker – Awake and Sing! as Bessie Berger
Best Performance by a Featured Actor in a Musical	Best Performance by a Featured Actress in a Musical
**Christian Hoff – Jersey Boys as Tommy DeVito**; Danny Burstein – The Drowsy Chaperone as Aldolpho; Jim Dale – The Threepenny Opera as Mr. Peachum; Brandon Victor Dixon – The Color Purple as Harpo; Manoel Felciano – Sweeney Todd as Tobias	**Beth Leavel – The Drowsy Chaperone as The Drowsy Chaperone**; Carolee Carmello – Lestat as Gabrielle de Lioncourt; Felicia P. Fields – The Color Purple as Sofia Johnson; Megan Lawrence – The Pajama Game as Gladys Hotchkiss; Elisabeth Withers – The Color Purple as Shug Avery
Best Book of a Musical	Best Original Score (Music and/or Lyrics) Written for the Theatre
**Bob Martin and Don McKellar – The Drowsy Chaperone**; Marsha Norman – The Color Purple; Marshall Brickman and Rick Elice – Jersey Boys; Chad Beguelin and Tim Herlihy – The Wedding Singer	**The Drowsy Chaperone – Lisa Lambert and Greg Morrison (music and lyrics)**; The Color Purple – Brenda Russell, Allee Willis and Stephen Bray (music and lyrics); The Wedding Singer – Matthew Sklar (music) and Chad Beguelin (lyrics); The Woman in White – Andrew Lloyd Webber (music) and David Zippel (lyrics)
Best Scenic Design of a Play	Best Scenic Design of a Musical
**Bob Crowley – The History Boys**; John Lee Beatty – Rabbit Hole; Santo Loquasto – Three Days of Rain; Michael Yeargan – Awake and Sing!	**David Gallo – The Drowsy Chaperone**; John Lee Beatty – The Color Purple; Derek McLane – The Pajama Game; Klara Zieglerova – Jersey Boys
Best Costume Design of a Play	Best Costume Design of a Musical
**Catherine Zuber – Awake and Sing!**; Michael Krass – The Constant Wife; Santo Loquasto – A Touch of the Poet; Catherine Zuber – Seascape	**Gregg Barnes – The Drowsy Chaperone**; Susan Hilferty – Lestat; Martin Pakledinaz – The Pajama Game; Paul Tazewell – The Color Purple
Best Lighting Design of a Play	Best Lighting Design of a Musical
**Mark Henderson – The History Boys**; Christopher Akerlind – Awake and Sing!; Paul Gallo – Three Days of Rain; Mark Henderson – Faith Healer	**Howell Binkley – Jersey Boys**; Ken Billington and Brian Monahan – The Drowsy Chaperone; Natasha Katz – Tarzan; Brian MacDevitt – The Color Purple
Best Direction of a Play	Best Direction of a Musical
**Nicholas Hytner – The History Boys**; Wilson Milam – The Lieutenant of Inishmore; Bartlett Sher – Awake and Sing!; Daniel Sullivan – Rabbit Hole	**John Doyle – Sweeney Todd**; Kathleen Marshall – The Pajama Game; Des McAnuff – Jersey Boys; Casey Nicholaw – The Drowsy Chaperone
Best Choreography	Best Orchestrations
**Kathleen Marshall – The Pajama Game**; Rob Ashford – The Wedding Singer; Donald Byrd – The Color Purple; Casey Nicholaw – The Drowsy Chaperone	**Sarah Travis – Sweeney Todd**; Larry Blank – The Drowsy Chaperone; Dick Lieb and Danny Troob – The Pajama Game; Steve Orich – Jersey Boys

=== Special awards ===
- Special Tony Award
  - **Sarah Jones** for **Bridge & Tunnel**
- Regional Theater Tony Award
  - **Intiman Theatre, Seattle, Washington**
- Special Tony Award for Lifetime Achievement in the Theatre
  - **Harold Prince**

== Multiple nominations and awards ==
These productions had multiple nominations:

- 13 nominations: The Drowsy Chaperone
- 11 nominations: The Color Purple
- 9 nominations: The Pajama Game
- 8 nominations: Awake and Sing! & Jersey Boys
- 7 nominations: The History Boys
- 6 nominations: Sweeney Todd
- 5 nominations: The Lieutenant of Inishmore, Rabbit Hole & The Wedding Singer
- 4 nominations: The Constant Wife & Faith Healer
- 2 nominations: Lestat, Seascape, Shining City, Three Days of Rain, The Threepenny Opera & Well

The following productions received multiple awards.

- 6 wins: The History Boys
- 5 wins: The Drowsy Chaperone
- 4 wins: Jersey Boys
- 2 wins: Awake and Sing!, The Pajama Game & Sweeney Todd

== In Memoriam ==
- August Wilson
- Wendy Wasserstein
- Cy Feuer
- Jay Presson Allen
- Anne Bancroft
- Barbara Bel Geddes
- Donald Brooks
- Oleg Cassini
- Constance Cummings
- Katherine Dunham
- Stephen Elliott
- Geraldine Fitzgerald
- Henderson Forsythe
- Anthony Franciosa
- Michael Gibson
- T. Edward Hambleton
- Betty Lee Hunt
- Don Knotts
- Sid Luft
- Darren McGavin
- Fayard Nicholas
- Brock Peters
- John Spencer
- Maureen Stapleton
- Frederic B. Vogel
- Shelley Winters
- Robert Wright

== See also ==
- Drama Desk Awards
- 2006 Laurence Olivier Awards – equivalent awards for West End theatre productions
- Obie Award
- New York Drama Critics' Circle
- Theatre World Award
- Lucille Lortel Awards
