= D'Arcy Carden =

American actress and comedian (born 1980)

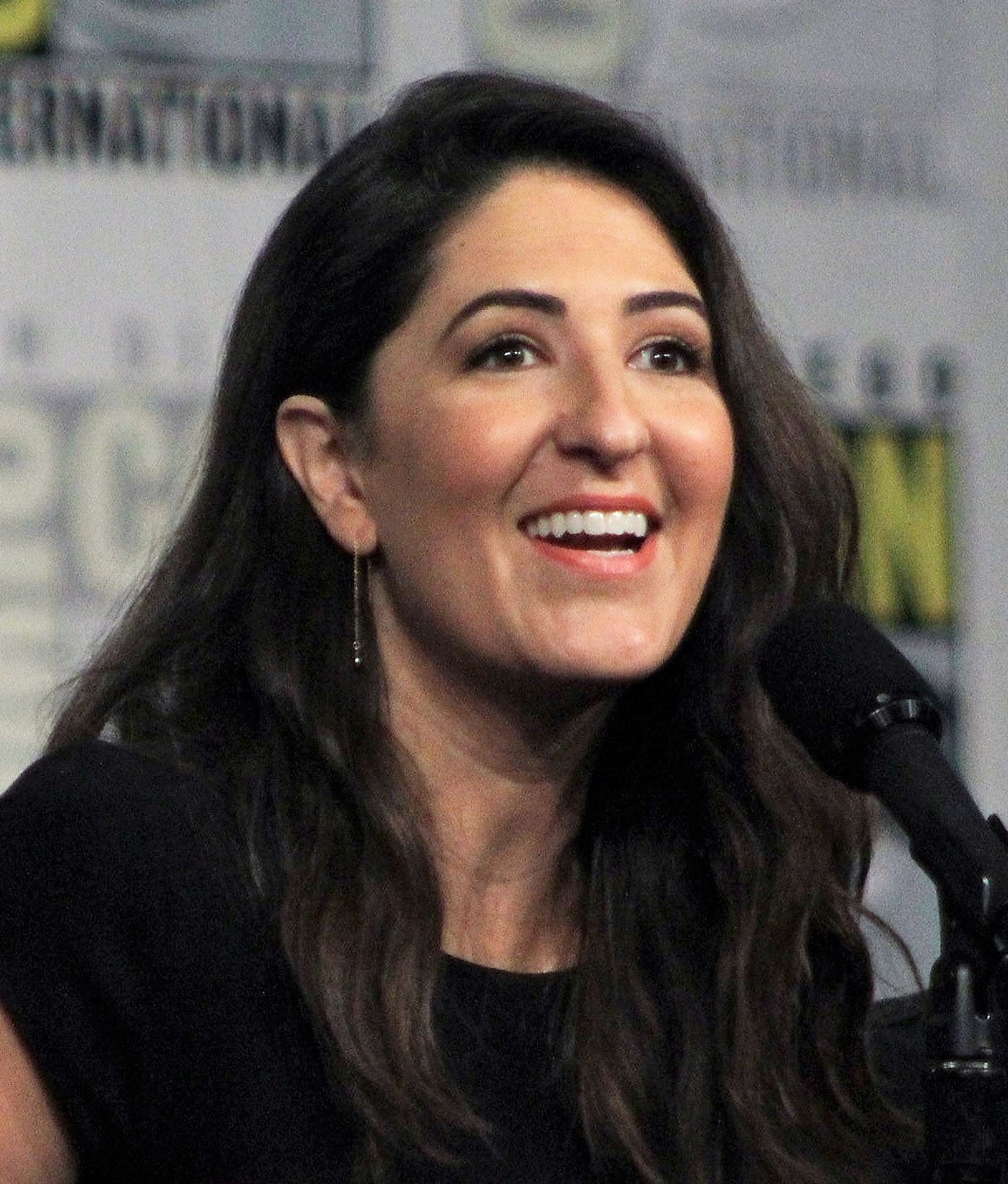
- Carden in July 2018
- Born: Darcy Beth Erokan; January 4, 1980 (age 46); Danville, California, U.S.
- Education: Southern Oregon University (BFA)
- Years active: 2009–present
- Spouse: Jason Carden (m. 2010)

D'Arcy Beth Carden (born Darcy Beth Erokan; January 4, 1980) is an American actress and comedian. She is best known for portraying Janet in the NBC sitcom The Good Place (2016–2020), for which she earned a nomination for a Primetime Emmy Award for Outstanding Supporting Actress in a Comedy Series, and Greta Gill in the Prime series A League of Their Own (2022). She also played Gemma in Broad City (2014–2019) and Natalie Greer in the HBO dark comedy series Barry (2018–2023).

Carden began her career performing improvisational comedy at the Upright Citizens Brigade Theatre. She went on to make appearances in several television series, including Inside Amy Schumer (2015), Crazy Ex-Girlfriend (2016), and Veep (2017). She has also acted in films such as Other People (2016), Let It Snow (2019), and Bombshell (2019). She made her Broadway debut in The Thanksgiving Play (2023).

== Early life ==
Carden was born Darcy Beth Erokan in Danville, California, on January 4, 1980, the daughter of an American mother and Turkish father. Her father, Dennis Erokan, left Istanbul for California with his family when he was a child. He acted in local community theater productions, and later founded the music magazine BAM and its computer-focused spinoff MicroTimes. Carden has two sisters, Miranda and Laney, and one brother, Will. Inspired by The Smashing Pumpkins' bassist D'arcy Wretzky, she added an apostrophe to the spelling of her name when she was in junior high. She graduated from San Ramon Valley High School in 1998, and later received a BFA in Theater from Southern Oregon University.

== Career ==
After graduating from college, Carden moved to New York City. She joined musical comedy company Venus Rising and appeared in Seven Hearts (2001), a musical about friends living in San Francisco. The following year, she directed, produced, and starred in a holiday show in which the main character is upset that her family is obsessed with her selfish sister's wedding rather than keeping up their Christmas spirit. Early on while pursuing her acting career, Carden also worked as a nanny for Bill Hader.

A friend invited Carden to an improvisational sketch comedy show at the Upright Citizens Brigade Theatre (UCB), which she enjoyed so much that she signed on for classes and kept progressing with the group. She started with UCB in 2004 and later toured with the UCB Touring company. By 2010, she was using her married surname Carden professionally when she was a cast member for The Ride, an interactive show performed on New York City tour buses. In 2013, Carden co-created and co-starred in Terrible Babysitters, a Web original about two parents who want to find a babysitter.

Carden had a recurring role as Gemma in the Comedy Central comedy series Broad City (2014–2019), a series created by fellow UCB alumnae Ilana Glazer and Abbi Jacobson. Carden also appeared in guest roles in the comedy series Inside Amy Schumer (2015), Crazy Ex-Girlfriend (2016), and Veep (2017). Following small roles in the parody film iSteve (2013) and the romantic comedy The To Do List (2013), she appeared as Jessica in the acclaimed comedy-drama film Other People (2016).

In 2016, Carden began starring as live virtual assistant Janet in the NBC comedy series The Good Place, which also stars Kristen Bell and Ted Danson. For her performance in the series, she received critical acclaim and earned nominations for the Critics' Choice Television Award for Best Supporting Actress in a Comedy Series and the Primetime Emmy Award for Outstanding Supporting Actress in a Comedy Series.

From 2018 until 2023, Carden had a recurring role as Natalie Greer in the HBO dark comedy-crime series Barry, starring Hader. Along with her fellow cast members, she was nominated for the Screen Actors Guild Award for Outstanding Performance by an Ensemble in a Comedy Series in 2018 and 2019.

In 2019, she appeared in the dark comedy film Greener Grass, the romantic comedy film Let It Snow, and the drama film Bombshell. She also appeared in the Netflix comedy series Bonding and the Adult Swim animated comedy series Robot Chicken.

In 2020, Carden had a recurring role on the Quibi mystery-comedy series Mapleworth Murders.

In 2022, Carden starred as first baseman Greta Gill in the Prime Video comedy-drama A League of Their Own (2022 TV series), directed by Abbi Jacobson and Will Graham. The show is based on the 1992 movie A League Of Their Own and has been praised for its diverse representation, nuanced storytelling and historical accuracy.

Carden made her Broadway debut on April 20, 2023, as Alicia in The Thanksgiving Play, written by Larissa FastHorse and directed by Rachel Chavkin.

In 2024, SmartLess Media debuted WikiHole, a podcast fronted by Carden and featuring "a panel of comedians who fall down a Wikipedia rabbit hole of bizarre and intriguing connections." Carden was also announced in a lead cast member in the comedy series Sunny Nights. In 2026, Carden played Brooke in The Five-Star Weekend. The show rated well and has been renewed for a second season.

== Personal life ==
Carden met producer Jason Carden on a trip to Disneyland with mutual friends, and they were married on July 31, 2010. In 2013, they moved from New York City to Los Angeles.

Before finding success in the entertainment industry, Carden worked as a full-time nanny for her future Barry co-star Bill Hader and his then-wife Maggie Carey; she maintains a close relationship with their three daughters.

Carden is close friends with the Crutchfield twins, Katie and Allison (from musical groups Waxahatchee and Swearin'), and coincidentally shares a birthday with them. The three have thrown joint "Sweet 16" birthday party concerts in both 2025 and 2026 in Los Angeles, at Largo and the El Rey Theatre respectively. The Crutchfields and Carden performed a series of covers at both events, with special guests including Will Forte, Bowen Yang, Audrey Hobert, Jeff Tweedy, Courtney Barnett, Kyle Mooney and Carrie Brownstein.

== Filmography ==
Key
†	Denotes films that have not yet been released

=== Film ===
Year	Title	Role	Notes
2013	iSteve	News Anchor	
2013	The To Do List	Movie Patron	
2016	Other People	Jessica	
2018	Papi Chulo	Susan	
2019	Greener Grass	Miss Human	
2019	Let It Snow	Kira	
2019	Bombshell	Rebekah	
2021	Ride the Eagle	Audrey	Also producer
2022	The People We Hate at the Wedding	Martha	
2022	Shotgun Wedding	Harriet	
2022	Wes Is Dying	Chelsea	Also executive producer
2023	Dicks: The Musical	Neighbor	
2024	The Gutter	Skunk	
2024	She Taught Love	Laura Neil	
2024	Sketch	Liz	
2024	Turn Me On	The Woman in a Suit	

=== Television ===
Key
†	Denotes television productions that have not yet been released

Year	Title	Role	Notes
2009	Homeschooled	Betty	Television film
2009–2013	UCB Comedy Originals	Herself	20 episodes
2009–2011	Rhonda Casting	Rhonda Basmati	Main role
2010	Naked in a Fishbowl	Lucy	3 episodes
2011	Diamonds Wow!	Unknown	Episode: "Oprahgeddon"
2011–2012	Jest Originals	Various roles	4 episodes
2013	Inside Amy Schumer	Emily	Episode: "Meth Lab"
2013–2015	Comedy Bang! Bang!	Barbara Fleen / Assistant	3 episodes
2014–2019	Broad City	Gemma	Recurring role
2015	Adam Ruins Everything	Future Wife	Episode: "Adam Ruins Giving"
2016	Crazy Ex-Girlfriend	Eyebrows Girl	Episode: "I'm Going to the Beach with Josh and His Friends!"
2016–2020	The Good Place	Janet	Main role
2017	Veep	Congresswoman	Episode: "Blurb"
2018–2023	Barry	Natalie Greer	Recurring role (seasons 1–3); guest role (season 4)
2018	An Emmy for Megan	D'Arcy Carden	Episode: "Finale"
2018–2025	American Dad!	Sophia / various (voice)	6 episodes
2019	Bonding	Daphne	3 episodes
2019	Last Week Tonight with John Oliver	Homeowner	Episode: "Mobile Homes"
2019	Human Discoveries	Leader Elk (voice)	Episode: "And Then They Played a Game"
2019	Robot Chicken	Various voices	Episode: "Bugs Keith in: I Can't Call Heaven, Doug"
2019–2020	The Rocketeer	Polly Poly / AVA (voice)	4 episodes
2020	Single Parents	Kay	Episode: "Yarn and Pebbles"
2020	Mapleworth Murders	Server	2 episodes
2020	Archer	Hands (voice)	Episode: "Helping Hands"
2021	No Activity	Erika (voice)	Episode: "Brother Eduardo"
2021	Creepshow	Renee Sherman	Episode: "Night of the Living Late Show"
2021	Poorly Drawn Lines	Tanya (voice)	10 episodes
2021–2023	DreamWorks Dragons: The Nine Realms	Linda (voice)	13 episodes
2022	The Ghost and Molly McGee	Pango (voice)	Episode: “Scare Tactics/The Bad Boy Bobby Daniels”
2022	Killing It	Sloane Faulkner	Episode: “The Task Rabbit”
2022	A League of Their Own	Greta Gill	Main role
2022	The Great American Baking Show: Celebrity Holiday	Herself	Holiday special
2023	History of the World, Part II	Turkish Ambassador	Episode: "VII"
2023	The $100,000 Pyramid	Self - Celebrity Player	Episode: "Deon Cole vs D'Arcy Carden and Ken Jennings vs Mario Cantone"
2023	Strange Planet	Air Comfort Hero / Newsbeing #2 (voice)	Episode: "The Flying Machine"
2023	Krapopolis	Camille the Hydra (voice)	Episode: "Tyrdra"
2024	Clone High	Mary (voice)	3 episodes
2024–2025	Nobody Wants This	Ryann	4 episodes
2024	A Man on the Inside	Professor Della Denunzio	Episode: "The Spy Who Came in from the Cold"
2025	The Handmaid's Tale	Aunt Phoebe / Ava	3 episodes
2025	Adults	Allison	Episode: "The Mail"
2025	Loot	Luciana	3 episodes
2025	Sunny Nights	Vicki	8 episodes
2026	The Five-Star Weekend	Brooke Kirtley	Main role
TBA	Rhona Who Lives by the River †	Kayleigh (voice)	Upcoming series

=== Web series ===
Year	Title	Role	Notes
2014–2016	CollegeHumor Originals	Mom	3 episodes
2016	CollegeHumor - If Google was a Guy (5)	Denier	
2019	Good Mythical Morning	Herself	1 episode
2024	WikiHole with D'Arcy Carden	Host	Podcast

=== Theatre ===
Year	Title	Role	Playwright	Venue	Ref.
2023	The Thanksgiving Play	Alicia	Larissa FastHorse	Hayes Theater	<

== Awards and nominations ==
Year	Association	Category	Work	Result	Ref.
2019	Screen Actors Guild Award	Outstanding Performance by an Ensemble in a Comedy Series	Barry	Nominated	
2020	Critics' Choice Television Award	Best Supporting Actress in a Comedy Series	The Good Place	Nominated	
2020	Primetime Emmy Award	Outstanding Supporting Actress in a Comedy Series	The Good Place	Nominated	
2020	Screen Actors Guild Award	Outstanding Performance by an Ensemble in a Comedy Series	Barry	Nominated	
2022	Hollywood Critics Association TV Award	Best Supporting Actress in a Broadcast Network or Cable Series, Comedy	Barry	Nominated	
2023	Drama League Awards	Distinguished Performance Award	The Thanksgiving Play	Nominated	
2023	Theatre World Awards	Outstanding Debut Performance in a Broadway or Off-Broadway Production	The Thanksgiving Play	Won	
