= The First Year (play) =

Play

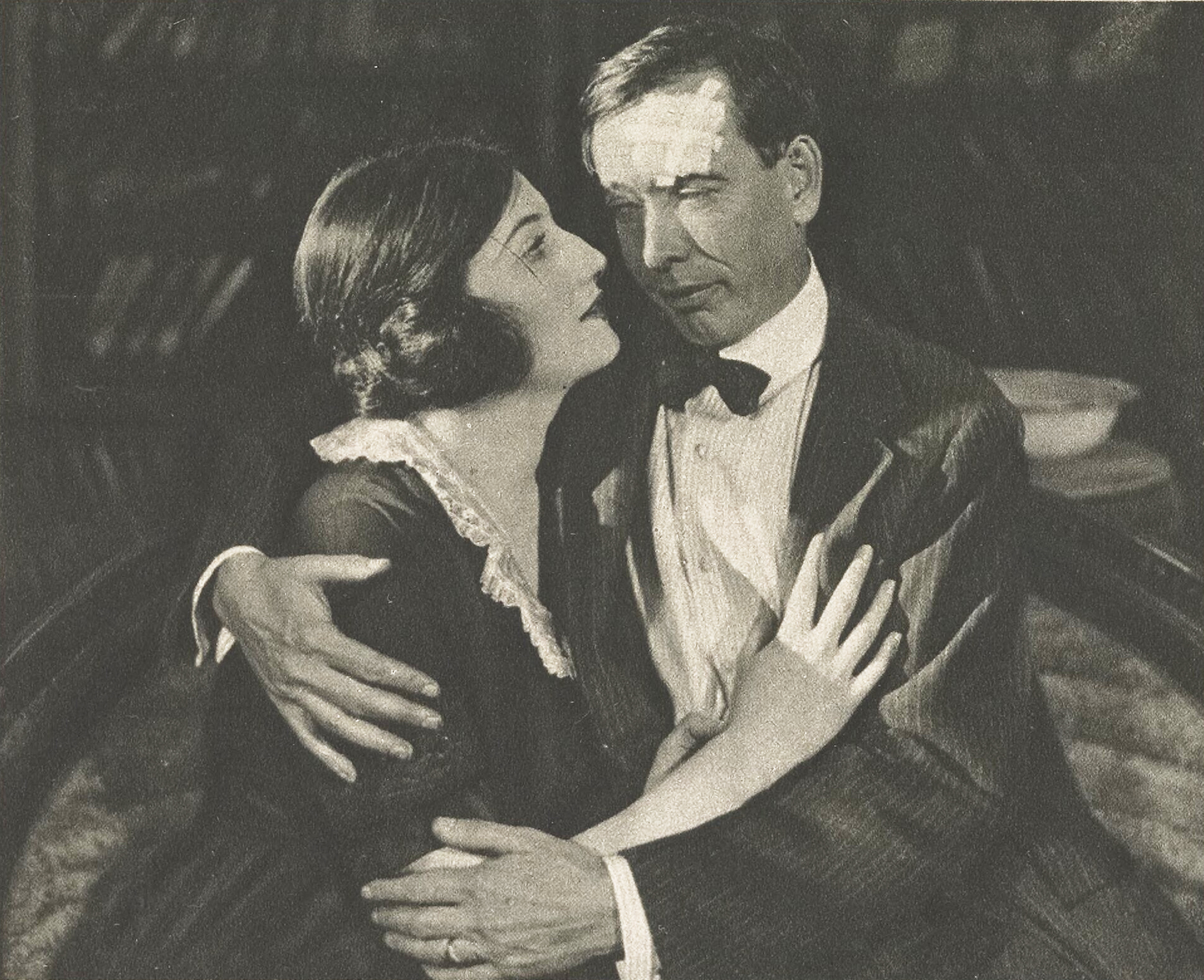
- Roberta Arnold and Craven in the play.
- Original language: English
- Written by: Frank Craven

Premiere
- Date: October 20, 1920 (Broadway)

The First Year is a 1920 American comedic play written by Frank Craven, and produced by John Golden and directed by Winchell Smith on Broadway. It was a hit on Broadway, running for 729 performances.

== Background ==
The three-act play, which centers on the first year of married life, ran on Broadway at the Little Theatre for 729 performances, opening on October 20, 1920 and running until June 17, 1922. (Prior to opening on Broadway, a warm-up performance was put on at the Apollo Theatre in Atlantic City, New Jersey on October 7, 1920.)

It was the biggest Broadway show of the season, and when it finally closed, it was the third-longest run in Broadway history to that time. It received positive reviews upon its release. Critic Alexander Woollcott even called it "one of the best, if not the best [comedy], ever written by an American."

After closing in New York, the company went on tour.

A London production was mounted in 1926-27, which opened at the Apollo Theatre on November 26, 1926, and moved to the Prince of Wales Theatre on March 27, 1927, with a total run of 180 performances.

The Equity Library Theatre staged a revival in New York in 1947.

== Film adaptations ==
It was adapted to films of the same name in 1926 and 1932.

== Original Broadway cast ==
- Roberta Arnold as Grace Livingston
- William Sampson as Mr. Livingston
- Maude Granger as Mrs. Livingston
- Tim Murphy as Dr. Anderson
- Lyster Chambers as Dick Loring
- Frank Craven as Thomas Tucker
- Leila Bennett as Hattie
- Hale Norcross as Mr. Barstow
- Merceita Esmonde as Mrs. Barstow
