= Bridge and Tunnel (play) =

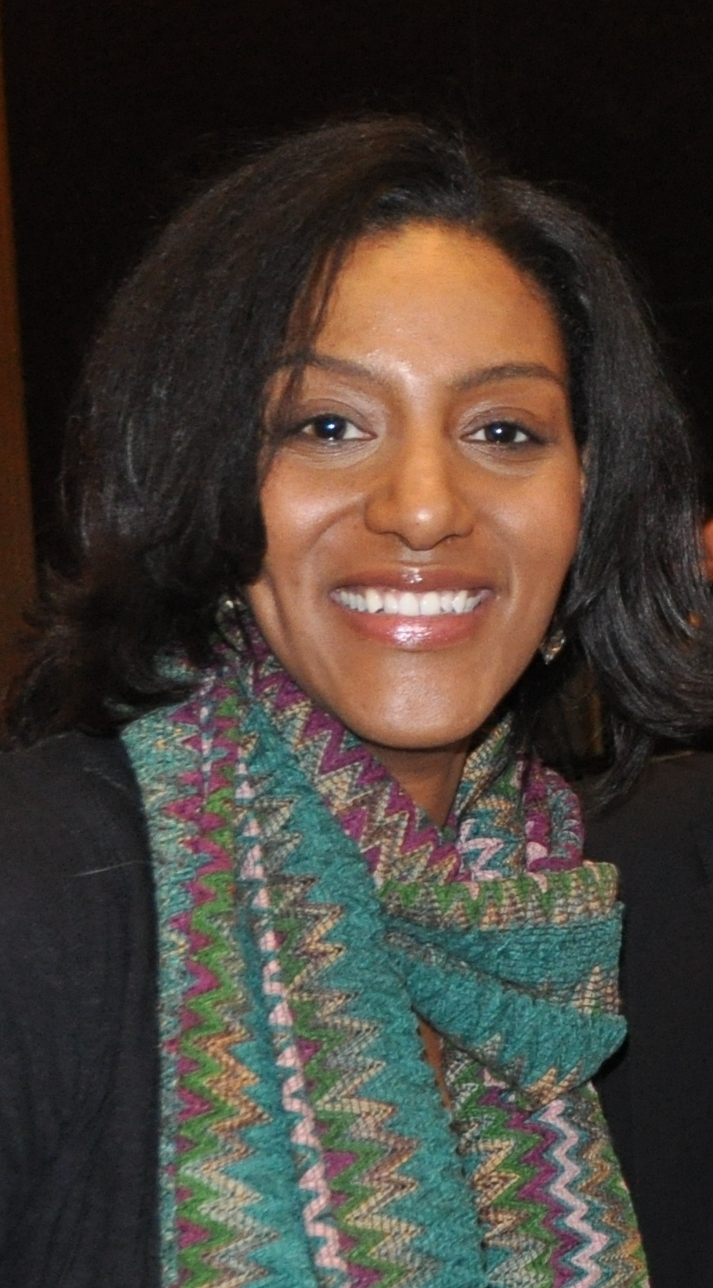
- Sarah Jones
- Written by: Sarah Jones
- Genre: One-woman show

Premiere
- Date premiered: 2004; 22 years ago
- Place premiered: 45 Bleecker Street Theater

Bridge & Tunnel is a one-woman Broadway show, in which all of the roles are performed by stage actress Sarah Jones. Jones explores the diverse immigrant makeup of the New York City boroughs outside Manhattan by playing a variety of different characters, each of a different race. The play comprises a series of monologues, in which each character takes the stage during a poetry reading and ends up talking about his or her life.

The play premiered Off-Broadway at the 45 Bleecker Street Theater on February 19, 2004, and closed on August 15, 2004. It won the 2003–04 Obie Award, Outstanding Performance. The play opened on Broadway at the Helen Hayes Theatre on January 13, 2006, in previews, officially on January 26, 2006, and closed on August 6, 2006, after 213 performances. The play won the Special Tony Award at the 2006 Tony Awards.
