= Hayes Theater =

Broadway theater in Manhattan, New York

- Helen Hayes Theatre; Little Theatre; New York Times Hall
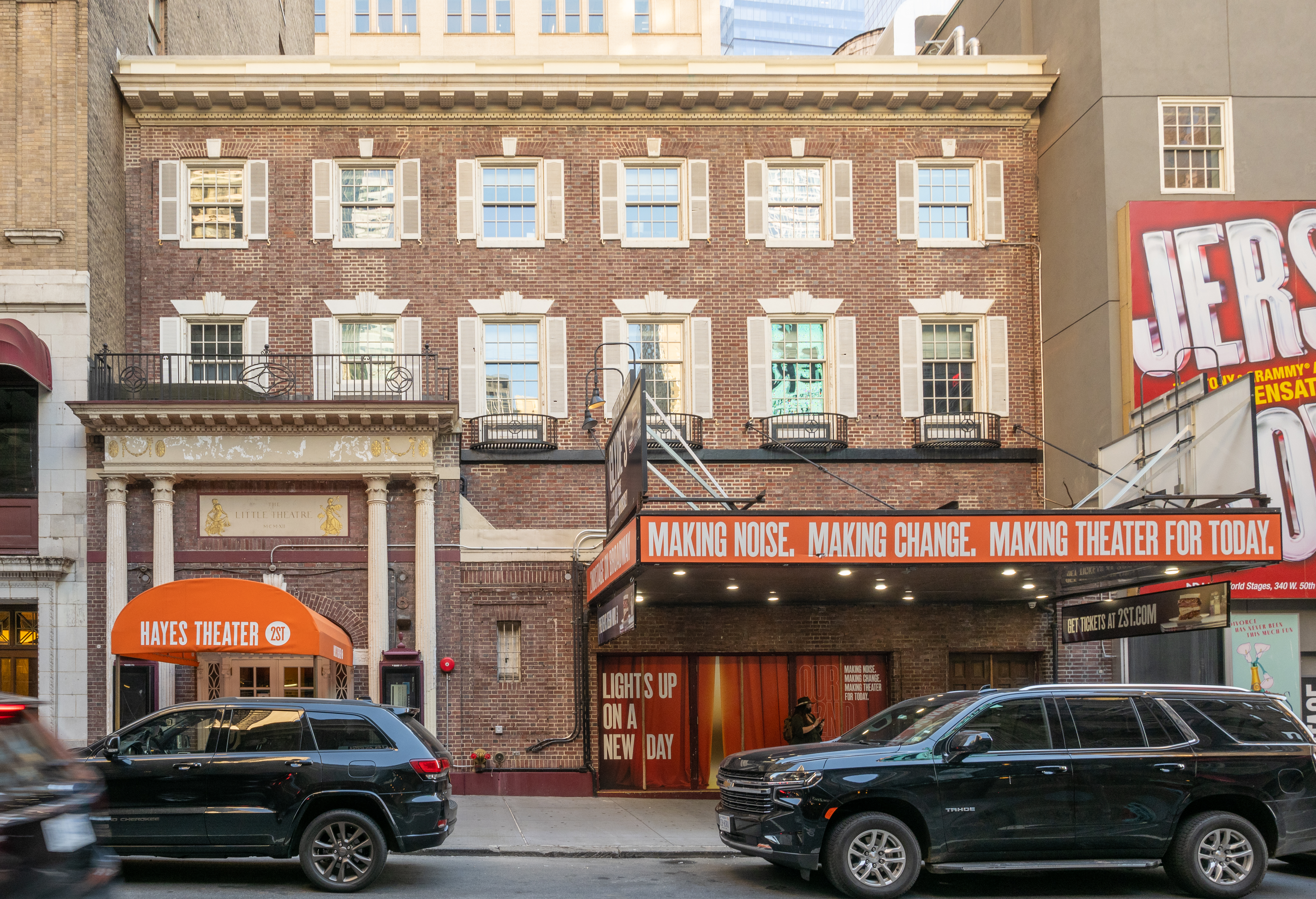
- Interactive map of Hayes Theater
- Address: 240 West 44th Street; Manhattan, New York; United States
- Coordinates: 40°45′28″N 73°59′16″W
- Owner: Second Stage Theater
- Capacity: 597
- Type: Broadway
- Production: The Fantasticks

Construction
- Opened: March 12, 1912 (114 years ago)
- Years active: 1912–1941, 1963–1965, 1974–present
- Architect: Harry Creighton Ingalls

New York City Landmark
- Designated: November 17, 1987
- Reference no.: 1346
- Designated entity: Facade

New York City Landmark
- Designated: November 17, 1987
- Reference no.: 1347
- Designated entity: Lobby (foyer and emergency-exit space), auditorium interior

The Hayes Theater (formerly the Little Theatre, New York Times Hall, Winthrop Ames Theatre, and Helen Hayes Theatre) is a Broadway theater at 240 West 44th Street in the Theater District of Midtown Manhattan in New York City, New York, U.S. Named for actress Helen Hayes, the venue is operated by Second Stage Theater. It is the smallest Broadway theater, with 597 seats across two levels. The theater was constructed in 1912 for impresario Winthrop Ames and designed by Ingalls & Hoffman in a neo-Georgian style. The original single-level, 299-seat configuration was modified in 1920, when Herbert J. Krapp added a balcony to expand the Little Theatre. The theater has served as a legitimate playhouse, a conference hall, and a broadcasting studio throughout its history.

The facade and parts of the theater's interior are New York City landmarks. The facade is made largely of red brick. The main entrance is through an arch on the eastern portion of the ground floor; the rest of the ground floor is taken up by emergency exits, shielded by marquee. The main entrance connects to a box-office lobby, as well as a foyer with a vaulted ceiling and staircases. The auditorium is decorated with ornamental plasterwork, with Adam-style design elements; it has a sloped orchestra level, one balcony level, and a flat ceiling. There are other spaces throughout the theater, including lounges.

Ames had intended for the Little Theatre to host new plays, but its unprofitability led him to expand the theater within a decade of its opening. Ames leased the theater to Oliver Morosco in 1919 and to John Golden in 1922. The New York Times bought the theater in 1931 with plans to raze it, but the Little continued hosting plays until 1941, when it was converted into a conference hall. The theater became an ABC broadcasting studio in 1951. The Little again hosted Broadway productions from 1963 to 1965, when it became a Westinghouse studio, taping shows such as the Merv Griffin Show. The Little again hosted Broadway productions starting in 1977, and it was then sold to Martin Markinson and Donald Tick, who renamed the theater for Helen Hayes in 1983. Second Stage bought the theater in 2015 and reopened it in 2018, shortening the name to the Hayes Theater.

== Site ==
The Hayes Theater is at 240 West 44th Street, on the south sidewalk between Eighth Avenue and Seventh Avenue, near Times Square in the Theater District of Midtown Manhattan in New York City, New York, U.S. The land lot is nearly rectangular, with an indentation on the western end. The lot covers 7,225 square feet (671.2 m^{2}), with a frontage of 75 feet (23 m) on 44th Street and a depth of 100.42 feet (31 m).

The Hayes Theater shares the city block with St. James Theatre to the west, Sardi's restaurant and 1501 Broadway to the east, and 255 West 43rd Street and 229 West 43rd Street to the south. Across 44th Street are the Row NYC Hotel to the northwest, the Majestic and Broadhurst theaters to the north, and the Shubert Theatre and One Astor Plaza to the northeast. Other nearby structures include the John Golden, Bernard B. Jacobs, Gerald Schoenfeld, and Booth theaters to the north, as well as the former Hotel Carter, Todd Haimes Theatre, and Lyric Theatre to the south. Prior to the theater's development, the site was part of the Astor family estate and contained several brownstone townhouses.

== Design ==
The Hayes Theater was designed by Ingalls & Hoffman for impresario Winthrop Ames using elements of the neo-Federal, colonial, and Georgian Revival styles. It was originally constructed in 1912 as the Little Theatre. In its original configuration, the Little's auditorium had just one level of seating. The layout was meant to give theater patrons the feeling that they were Ames's "guests for the nonce, in an old colonial house behind a garden wall, left behind in the march of progress, the front untouched and the interior remodeled by an amateur of the stage". The current two-level layout was completed in 1920 and designed by Herbert J. Krapp, who went on to become a prolific Broadway theater architect. The Hayes is operated by Second Stage Theater, a nonprofit theater company, as of 2018.

=== Facade ===
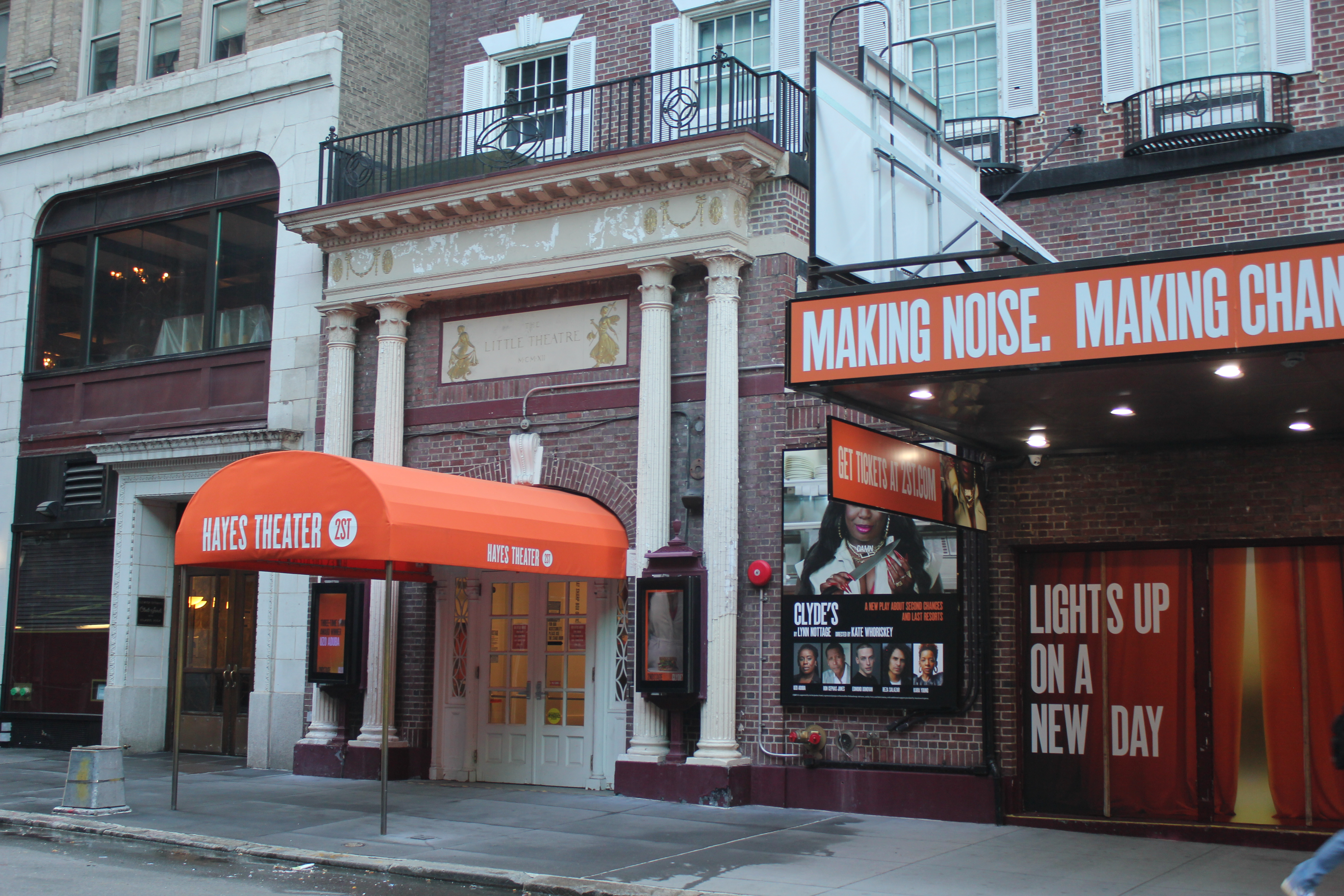
Main entrance

The facade consists of red brick with Flemish bond, as well as limestone trim. It is asymmetrically arranged, with the theater's main entrance to the far east (left) side of the ground floor. A stone water table runs along the bottom of the ground-floor facade. The rest of the facade was designed with sash windows containing white frames.

The entrance doorway is a brick arch, which contains impost blocks on either side, as well as a console-shaped keystone at the top. Within this arch are a set of wooden double doors, which are flanked by Ionic-style columns and by sidelights containing lozenge and oval patterns. The brick arch is flanked on either side by paired columns with Corinthian-style capitals. There are electronic signs between each column pair; these rest on pedestals and are topped by urns and volutes. A band course runs above the arch, behind the paired columns. Above this is a stone plaque with inscribed letters reading "The Little Theatre MCMXII", as well as a pair of dancing figures in low relief. The paired columns support a stone architrave above the doors.

To the west (right) of the entrance are four double doors, which provide an emergency exit from the lobby. This section of the facade formerly contained three narrow windows. A double door, designed to resemble a stable door, was originally placed between two of these windows. Carriage lamps were also mounted on the facade to give the impression that the theater was formerly a residence. Above the ground floor, the theater building has a setback, which was formerly decorated with potted plants.

The second and third stories each contain six sash windows flanked by shutters. The second-story window panes are arranged in an eight-over-twelve format; above them are splayed stone lintels, containing keystones with bead motifs and brackets. There are curved metal balconies in front of the four westernmost windows, while the two easternmost windows share a terrace over the main entrance. The third-story window panes are arranged in an eight-over-eight format with paneled keystones. A cornice with modillions runs above the third story. A balustrade formerly ran above the cornice but has since been removed.

=== Interior ===
==== Lobbies ====
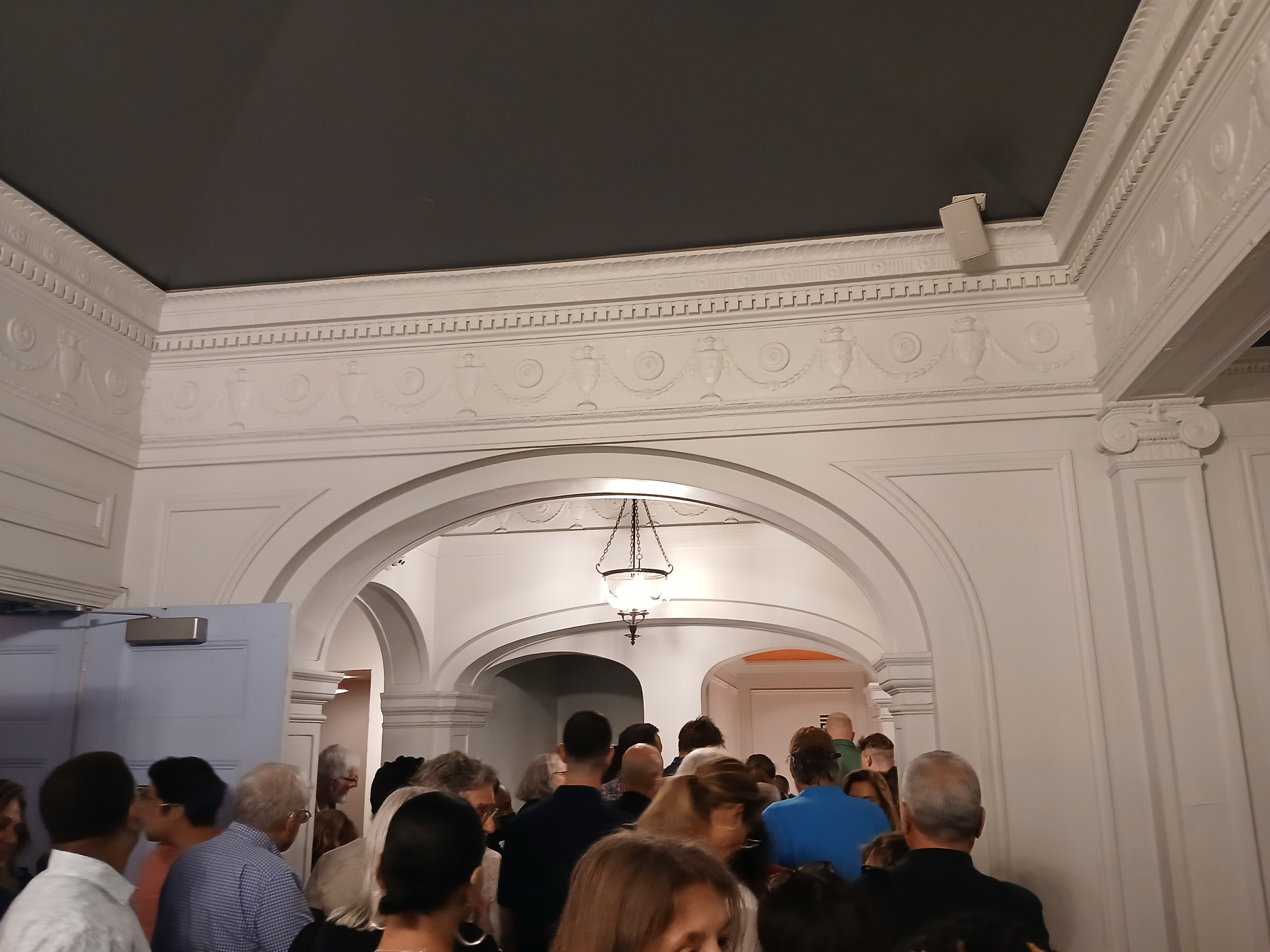
The western end of the lobby foyer contains an archway to the basement.

The main entrance leads to a box office, as well as a lobby with two sections. The box office was originally paneled in ivory-colored wood. A passage to the stage is through a door to the west of the box office. The lobby, to the west (right) of the box office, is designed with reliefs in the Adam style. The main section of the lobby is a rectangular foyer, accessed through a doorway on the box office's right wall. To the north of the foyer is a secondary area, one step below the foyer, which leads to the four emergency-exit doors on 44th Street.

The western end of the lobby foyer contains an archway to the basement; this was originally a wall with a fireplace. The foyer's north wall contains Ionic-style columns, behind which is the emergency-exit area. The south wall contains doors to the auditorium, as well as Ionic-style pilasters that are directly across from the north-wall columns. There are staircases on the western and eastern ends of the foyer's north wall, which lead up to the balcony; the eastern staircase has a metal railing with lyres. An architrave, with a frieze depicting urns and lyres, runs along the top of the foyer walls. The foyer contains a barrel-vaulted ceiling above the architrave, with a chandelier suspended from an Adam-style medallion. The emergency-exit area's ceiling contains Adam-style panels, and the architrave panels above the exit doors are also designed in the Adam style.

==== Auditorium ====
The Hayes Theater is the smallest Broadway venue, with 597 seats. The auditorium has an orchestra level, one balcony, and a stage behind the proscenium arch. The space is designed with plaster decorations in relief. Originally, the Little Theatre had only 299 seats on a single level, the orchestra. In the original configuration, there were only 15 rows of seats. One of the front seats was designed specifically to accommodate businessman J. P. Morgan. The rear of the auditorium did initially have a balcony-level terrace, but it was only 4 to 5 feet (1.2 to 1.5 m) wide and had no seats.

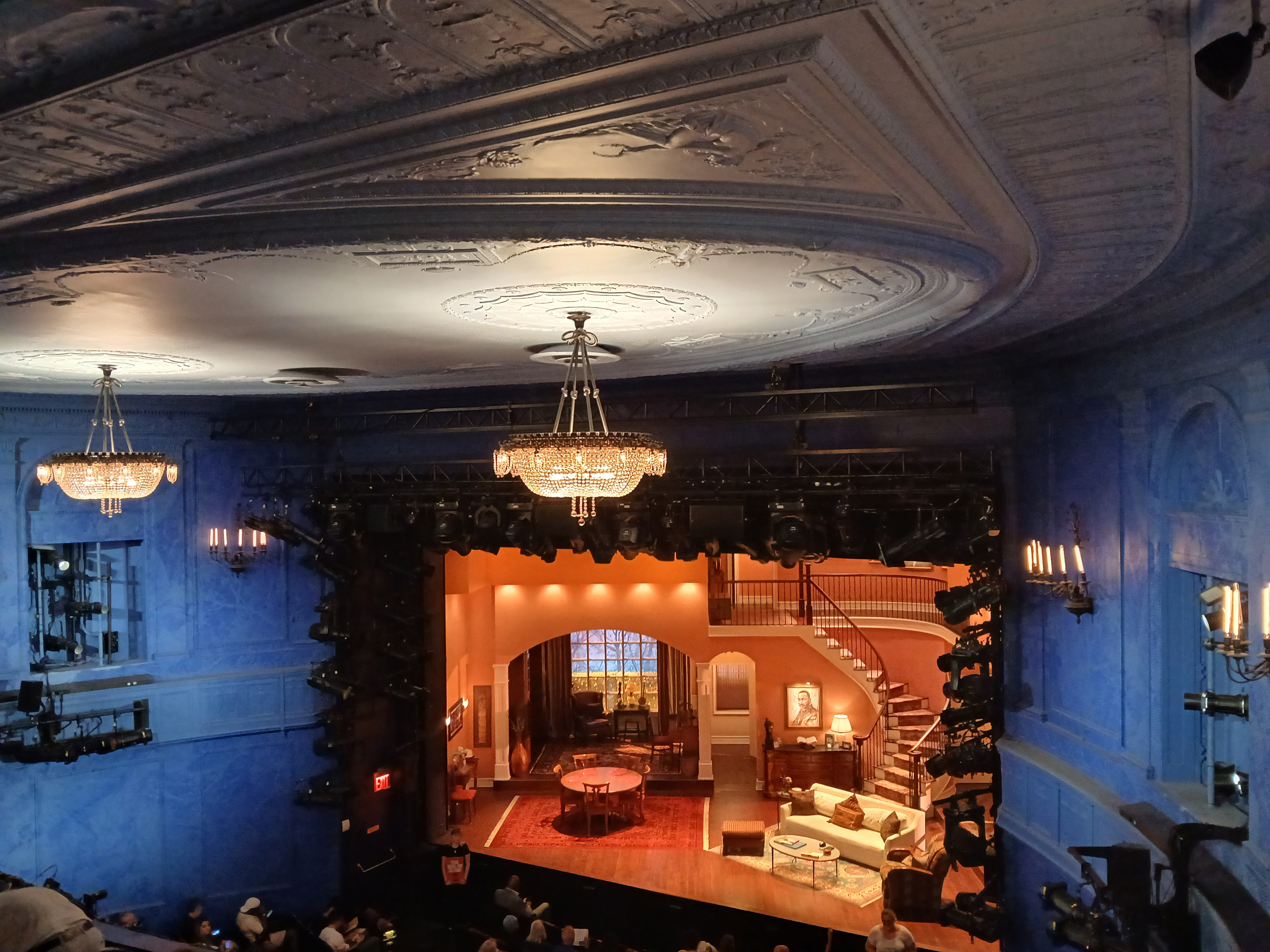
Interior of the auditorium, seen from the right balcony

The rear or southern end of the orchestra contains two paneled-wood doors from the foyer. The orchestra level is raked, sloping down toward the stage, similar to in the original layout of the theater. The side walls of the auditorium were originally covered in wooden panels, but these were replaced with plasterwork panels when Krapp renovated the theater. The front sections of the side walls are angled toward the proscenium, with emergency-exit doors at orchestra level. As of 2018, the side walls contain a pixelated blue mural that resembles the walls' former tapestries.

The rear of the balcony contains a promenade, accessed on either end by the stairways in the foyer. The openings to these stairways are flanked by panels. The balcony promenade's rear wall contains wainscoting, above which are plaster panels. Near the front of the balcony level, both of the side walls contain two arched openings with pilasters on either side, as well as fan-shaped lunettes above. One of these is an emergency exit, while the other is a window opening; these windows allowed Ames to observe the auditorium from his office. The side walls have lighting sconces as well. The underside of the balcony is made of plaster paneling with lights inset into the paneling. The front railing of the balcony has Adam-style plasterwork paneling with pilasters, urns, and molded bands, with light boxes mounted in front. The railing curves onto the side walls, giving the impression of box seats.

At the front of the auditorium is the proscenium, which contains a flat-arched opening flanked by angled bands. Behind the proscenium, there was originally a revolving stage, as well as three sets of curtains. A cornice runs above the proscenium and the side and rear walls, with rosettes, swags, and cartouches. The ceiling is flat but is decorated in ornate plasterwork, dating to Ingalls and Hoffman's design. The entire ceiling is surrounded by a band of rosette, swag, and urn motifs. The center of the ceiling contains a molded oval panel; the perimeter of the oval contains reliefs of cherubs and female figures, connected by swags. The corners of the oval contain triangular panels; those in the rear depict female figures with mirrors, while those in the front depict Roman masks. There are fan-shaped medallions inside the oval, from which hang chandeliers.

==== Other interior spaces ====
On the west wall of the foyer, the door to the left of the fireplace led to a ladies' room. It was painted like the box office and had a large mirror, dressing table, chaise longue, and mahogany side chairs with armure coverings in a rose color. To the right, stairs descended to a tea room that was similar in design to a residential living room. The tea room had old-English oak furnishings, white-paneled walls, blue-green curtains, and a gray carpet. The tea room was used not only to serve drinks during intermission but also as a cloak room. There were coat racks that could be pushed behind a Spanish-leather screen during performances. Also in the basement was a men's smoking room with oak wainscoting, yellowish-brown walls with benches, a cream-colored ceiling, and a red tile floor. Following a 2018 renovation, the basement has served as a concession area and lounge.

The second and third floors were equipped with offices. These included Winthrop Ames's offices, which were directly above the auditorium. Backstage, elevators and stairs led from the stage to the dressing rooms. There was also a green room from which the dressing rooms were accessed. Though green rooms were falling out of favor by the time the Little Theatre was constructed, one was included on Ames's insistence. The room was decorated with green walls, a long seat, and mirrors.

== History ==
Times Square became the epicenter for large-scale theater productions between 1900 and the Great Depression. Manhattan's theater district had begun to shift from Union Square and Madison Square during the first decade of the 20th century. From 1901 to 1920, forty-three theaters were built around Broadway in Midtown Manhattan, including the Little Theatre. Winthrop Ames, a member of a wealthy publishing family, did not enter the theatrical industry until 1905, when he was 34 years old. After being involved in the development of two large venues, Boston's Castle Square Theatre and New York City's New Theatre, Ames decided to focus on erecting smaller venues during the Little Theatre Movement. The New Theatre had failed quickly, as Ames's New Theatre Company only occupied the theater from 1909 to 1911. Ames saw the New as too large and too far away from Times Square.

=== Initial Broadway run ===
==== Development and early years ====
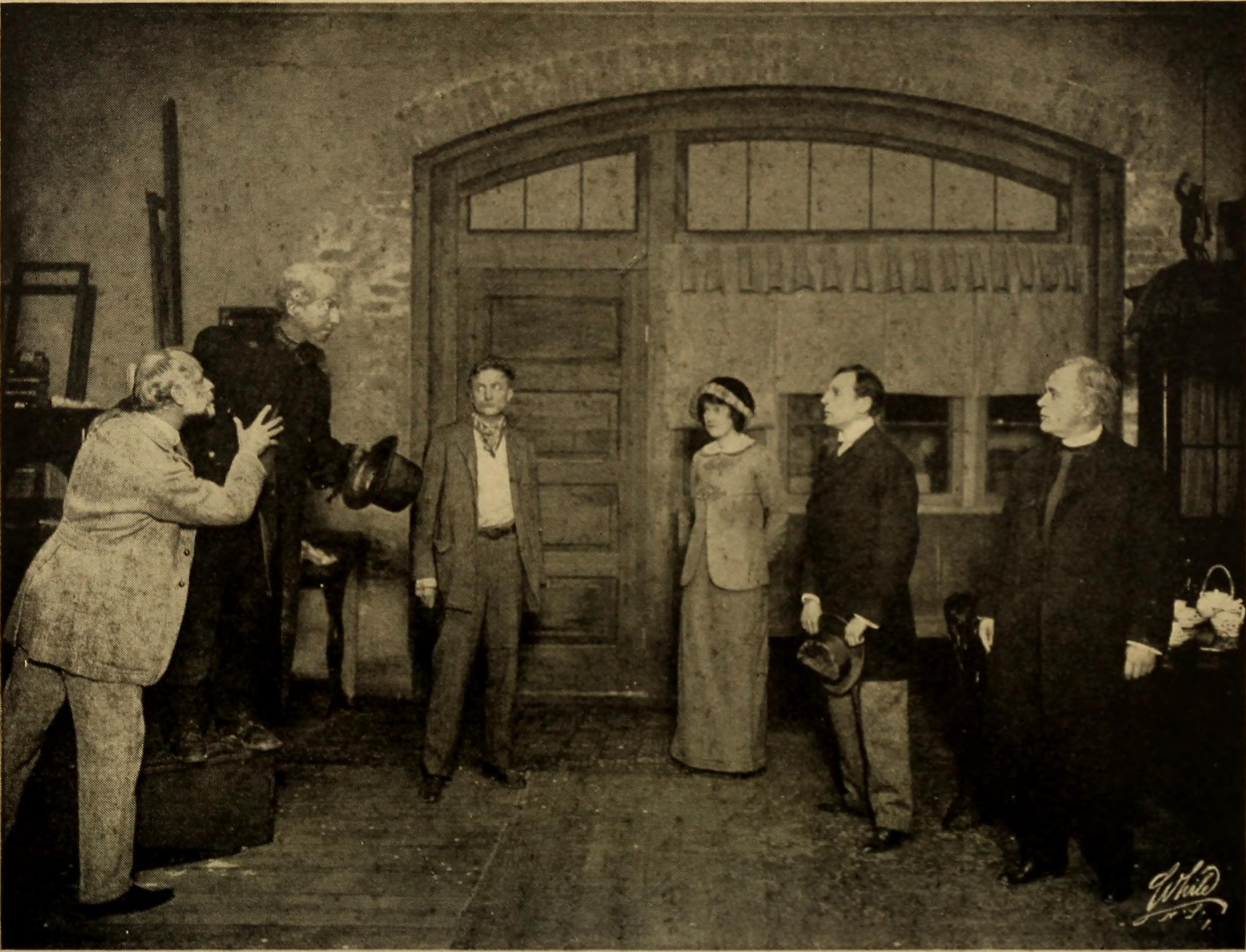
The Little Theatre opened with John Galsworthy's play The Pigeon (1912).

In September 1911, Ames announced his intention to build a 300-seat playhouse around Times Square. Two months later, Ingalls and Hoffman filed plans with the New York City Department of Buildings for the Little Theatre, a 299-seat theater at 238–244 West 44th Street, to cost $100,000. The 299-seat capacity exempted Ames from New York City Fire Department regulations, wherein theaters with at least 300 seats required emergency-exit alleys on either side. Ames also formed a corporation to operate the theater. The corporation issued stock, with Ames being the sole stockholder.

Ames released further details about the theater in December 1911. The Little was to be a single-level auditorium without balconies or boxes, and it was to host "plays of wide appeal" and "novelties". Ames wanted the theater to host "the clever, the unusual drama that has a chance of becoming a library classic". Some critics said the site was too far from Times Square, but Ames countered that the Belasco Theatre, one block east, was the same distance from Times Square. Another criticism was that Ames's theater was elitist because all seats had equally good views of the stage, with one ticket price for all seats. Construction progressed quickly, with over 150 workers being employed at one point.

The Little opened on March 12, 1912, with John Galsworthy's play The Pigeon. This was followed by a special matinee with Charles Rann Kennedy's The Terrible Meek and Ma Tcheu-Yuen's The Flower of the Palace of Han. The Little's productions of the 1912–1913 season included a revival of The Affairs of Anatol, as well as the original productions Snow White and the Seven Dwarfs and Rutherford and Son. Ames financed several of the initial shows at the theater, including Prunella and The Philanderer in 1913. The following year, the theater hosted A Pair of Silk Stockings, which was the Little's first major hit with 223 performances. In addition, in 1914, Ames started hiring musicians to play "new, original, unpublished American music" during intermission. At the end of that year, Ames's physician ordered him to take a twelve-month hiatus from theatrical productions. The Little Theater hosted no productions during the 1915–1916 theatrical season, as Ames did not return to producing until August 1916.

==== Expansion and Morosco/Golden operation ====
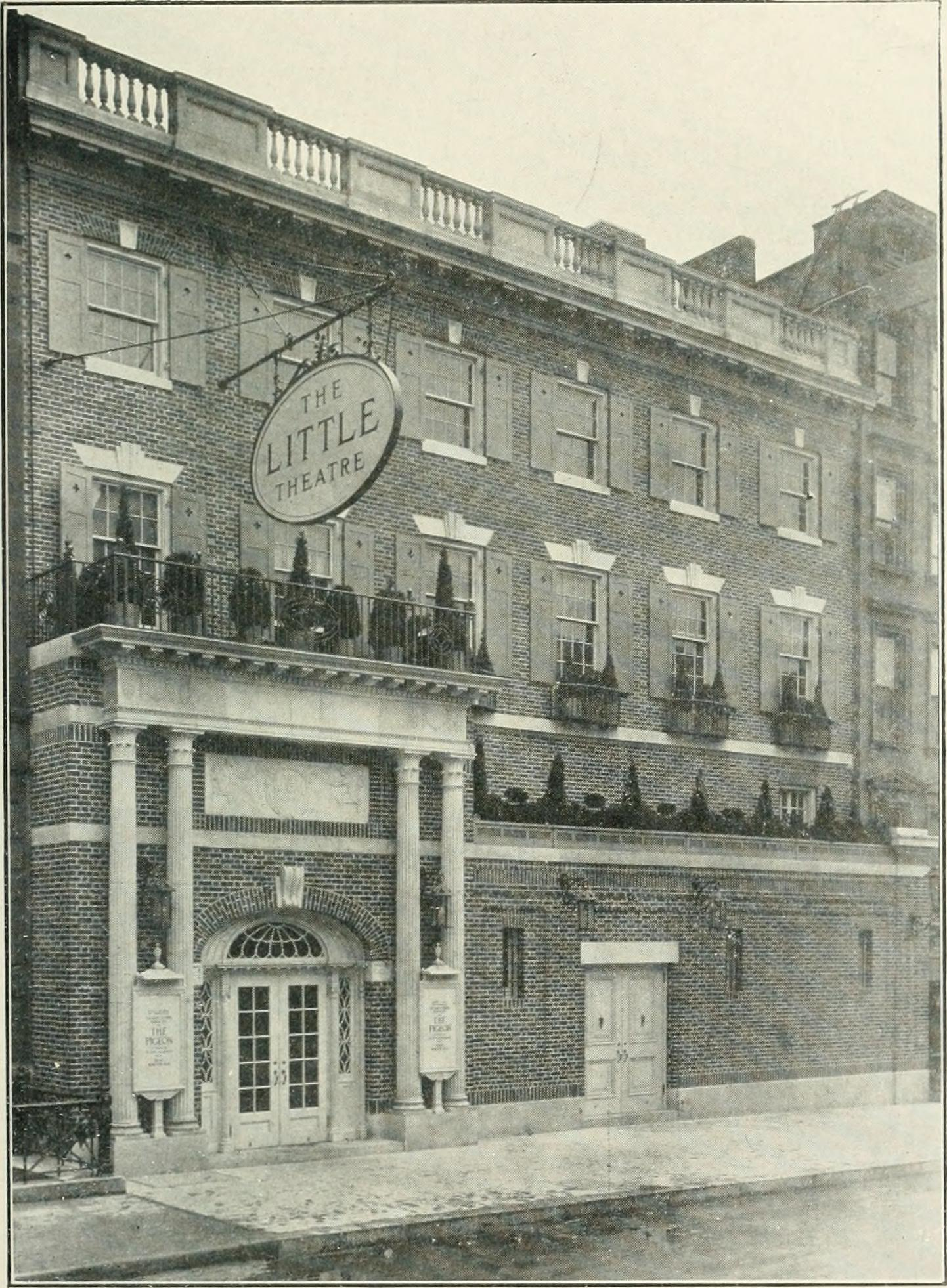
The facade as seen in 1913

By early 1915, the small capacity of the Little had restricted Ames's ability to profit from the venue, even though Ames charged a relatively affordable $2.50 per seat (equivalent to $79.56 in 2025). That March, The New York Times reported that Ames was planning to increase the capacity to 1,000 seats by adding a balcony, enlarging the auditorium, and replacing the stage. Two months later, Ames leased the dwelling at 244 West 44th Street for the possible enlargement of the theater. The New-York Tribune lamented that the city would "lose its gem among playhouses" with the planned enlargement. A Billboard magazine article that July indicated that the theater would receive a 200-seat balcony, increasing the capacity only to 500 seats. Ames hired Herbert J. Krapp in 1917 to remodel the theater with a balcony. Krapp kept the box office, the lobby, and the auditorium ceiling in their original condition. He removed the wainscoting and wall coverings, since these did not conform to New York City building regulations for larger venues, and added Adam-style decorations in their place.

A disagreement with the New York City Department of Buildings delayed the renovation by three years. In 1918, Rachel Crothers's play A Little Journey opened at the Little, running for 252 performances. The plans for the theater's renovation were approved in June 1919, and Ames leased the theater to Oliver Morosco the same month. The same year, Morosco presented Please Get Married, featuring Ernest Truex and Edith Taliaferro. When the theater's expansion was completed in early 1920, Morosco hosted two "experimental dramas": Rachel Barton Butler's Mama's Affair and Eugene O'Neill's Beyond the Horizon. John Golden's production of Frank Craven's The First Year, starring Craven and Roberta Arnold, opened at the Little in October 1920; that play ran for nearly two years. (Note: The production is variously cited as having run for 725, 729, or 760 performances.)

In August 1922, Golden acquired Morosco's stake in the lease, partnering with L. Lawrence Weber and F. Ray Comstock. (Note: Contemporary sources reported that Golden wanted to rename the theater after himself, but it is unclear if this occurred.) By that year, Ames had incurred a net deficit of $504,372 from the theater's operation, and the corporation operating the theater was dissolved. Craven's Spite Corner opened in September 1922 and stayed at the Little for three months. Two plays by Guy Bolton were staged at the Little in 1923: Polly Preferred with Genevieve Tobin and Chicken Feed with Roberta Arnold. The latter was transferred to another theater when Golden sought to transfer the revue Little Jessie James to the Little. The comedy Pigs opened at the Little in September 1924 and ran for 347 performances. This was followed in 1926 by two shows with over a hundred performances: Marc Connelly's The Wisdom Tooth and Gladys Buchanan Unger's Two Girls Wanted. Another hit was a transfer of the Grand Street Follies in 1927. Additionally, Rachel Crothers's Let Us Be Gay opened in 1929 with Francine Larrimore and Warren William, running for 353 performances.

==== Late 1920s and 1930s ====
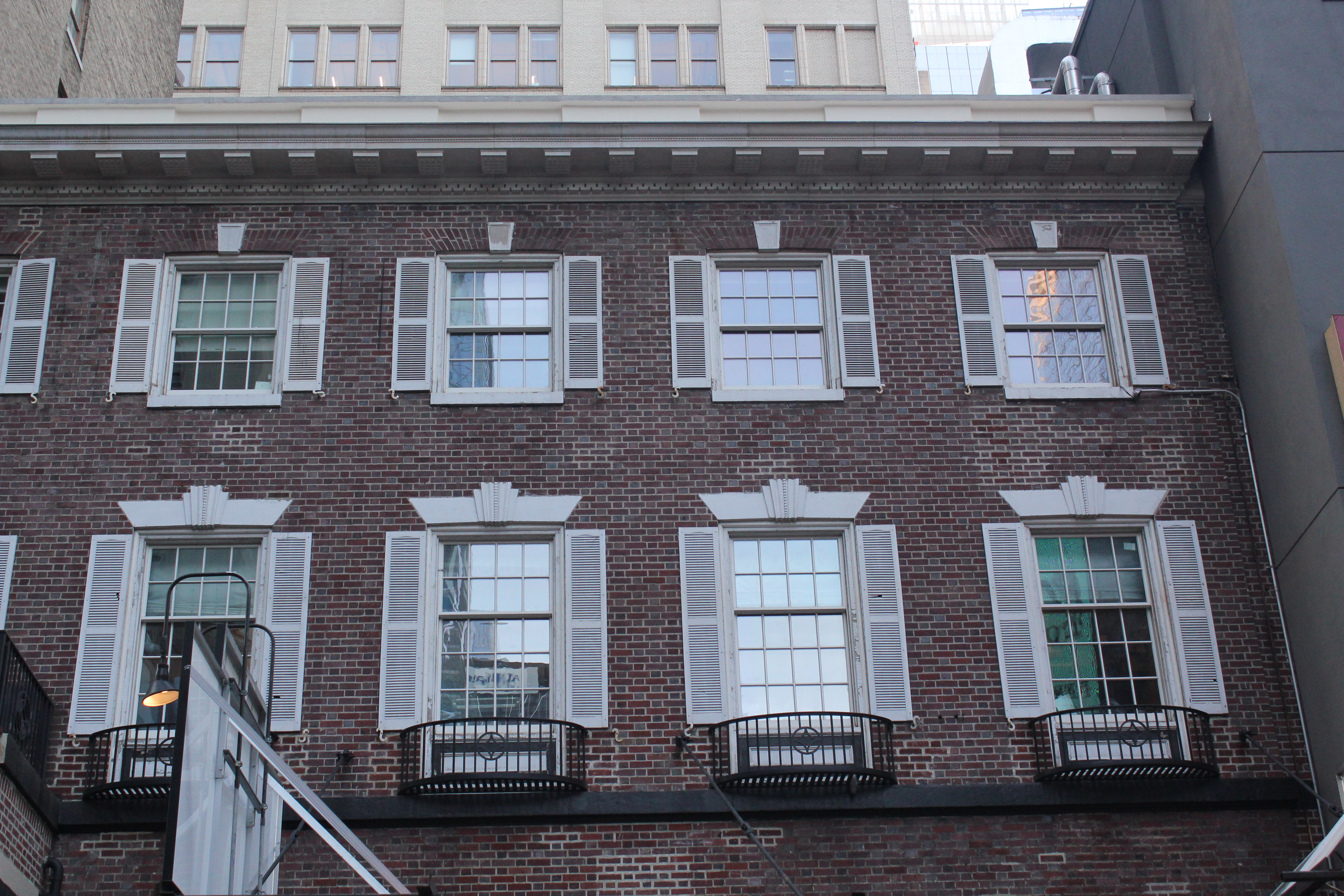
View of upper-story windows

Ames announced his retirement from producing in October 1929, but he said he would continue to control the Little Theatre, with Golden, Weber, and Comstock operating the venue. Two months later, the Little Theatre was leased to Chauncey W. Keim of the Harkem Holding Corporation for ten years. Harkem gave up its lease in June 1930, citing an unprofitable season. Later that year, the Little hosted Mr. Samuel with Edward G. Robinson, which was Ames's last show at the theater. This was followed in 1931 by Elmer Rice's The Left Bank. Vincent Astor sold the theater to the New York Times Company that November. According to the Times, the theater would "protect the light and air" of the Times annex at 229 West 43rd Street, as well as provide an additional exit from the annex. Variety magazine reported that the theater would be demolished to make way for the annex exit. Due to Depression-era budget cuts, the Times decided to keep the theater operating for at least a year. Ames's lease on the Little expired in May 1932.

The New York Times Company leased the theater to Little Theatre Operating Company for one year starting in September 1932. The new operator planned to host "contemporary light comedies". During this period, the Little hosted many relatively short-lived productions, including "a spate of plays with 'Honeymoon' in their titles". The theater passed to the Frankwyn Corporation, operated by Arch Selwyn and H. B. Franklin. In December 1934, Allen Robbins and Jacob Weiser assumed operation of the theater. The next February, the theater was leased to CBS as a broadcast studio. At the time, producer Brock Pemberton had offices on the upper stories; he was allowed to stay. CBS reduced the capacity to 475 seats and occupied the theater for a year and a half. The network, seeking a larger accommodation, ultimately leased the Manhattan (now Ed Sullivan) Theater in August 1936, vacating the Little Theatre by the end of the next month.

The playwright Anne Nichols leased the theater for legitimate productions in September 1936. Nichols moved her play Pre-Honeymoon there, and the venue became Anne Nichols' Little Theatre. During 1936 and 1937, the theater hosted productions such as Promise with Cedric Hardwicke, Sun Kissed with Jean Adair and Charles Coburn, and Abie's Irish Rose. The Little Theatre's original name was restored when Cornelia Otis Skinner's solo show Edna His Wife opened in December 1937. By March 1939, the Times was again contemplating destroying the Little Theatre. The theatrical firm of Bonfils and Somnes were leasing the theater at the time. The Shubert family (which operated several nearby theaters) and the operators of the neighboring Astor Hotel objected that the proposed demolition would lower their property values. The Times relented that July, delaying the proposed demolition by offering three-year leases in the theater building. In 1940, the Little hosted the revue Reunion in New York, featuring the American Viennese Group.

=== Intermittent theatrical use ===
==== 1940s and 1950s ====
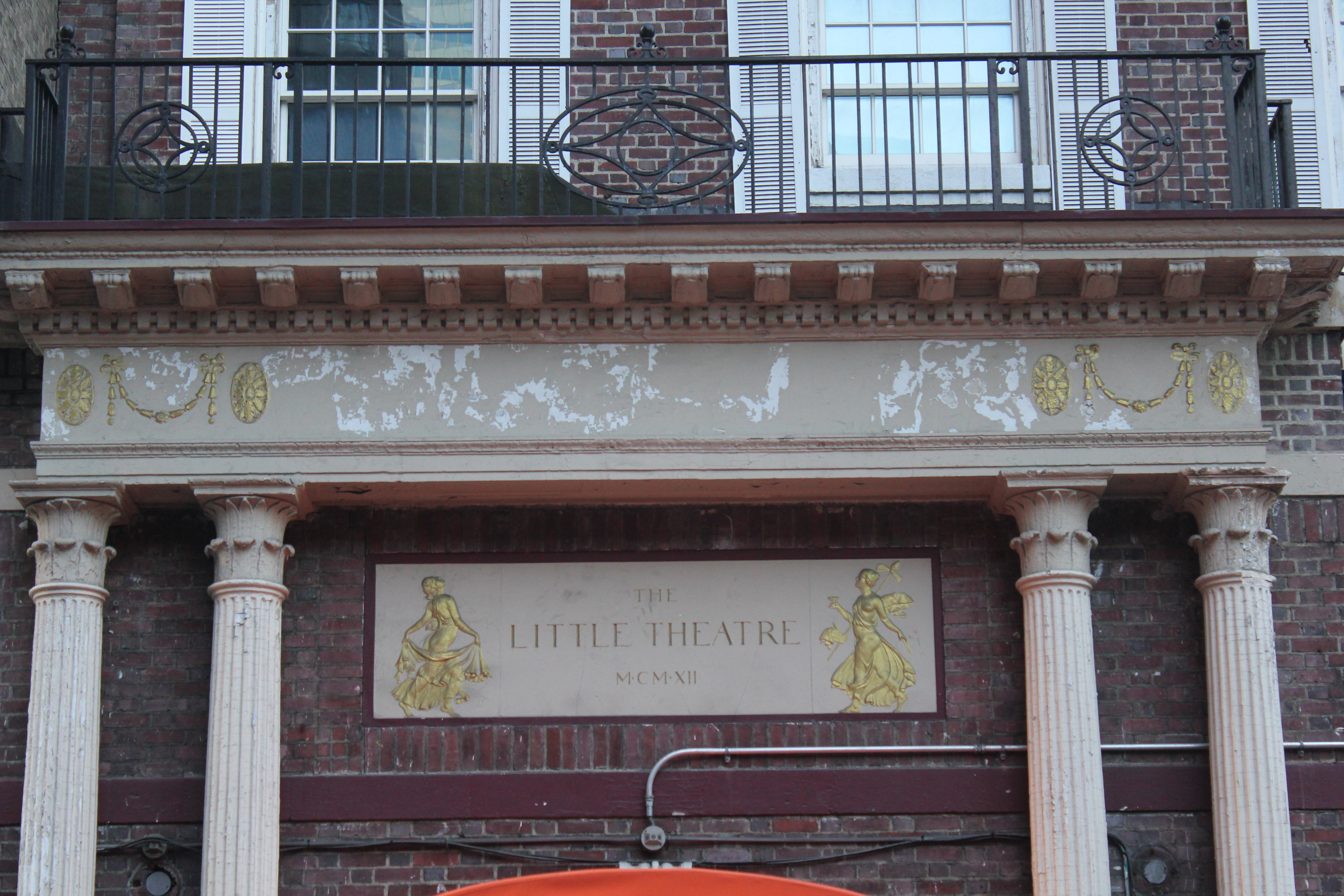
Plaque above the entrance

The theater became a conference center named the New York Times Hall in December 1941. (Note: According to Ken Bloom, the New York Times Company took over the Little Theatre and renamed it in January 1942. However, Variety magazine reported the takeover and name change the previous month.) The first event at the conference hall was a speech by mayor Fiorello La Guardia about air-raid preparations at schools. Under the Times's ownership, the theater sometimes hosted concerts and discussions. The events included "victory garden lectures", a book conference for children, an instrumental concert, and recitals from figures such as basso Emanuel List and dancer Lotte Goslar. The hall's steep rake was removed, and the pipes throughout the theater building were replaced. In August 1944, the New York Times Company filed plans for a 11-story building on the site of the Little Theatre, but these plans were not executed.

The American Broadcasting Company (ABC) leased the theater as a television studio by July 1951. (Note: Bloom 2007, p. 147, and Botto & Mitchell 2002, p. 53, erroneously cite the ABC studio conversion as having taken place in 1959, but the studio lease is recorded in contemporary sources from 1951.) ABC renovated the theater for The Frances Langford–Don Ameche Show, a variety show featuring Frances Langford and Don Ameche. The stage apron was extended into the orchestra, and lighting, control rooms, and camera arrangements were modified. The Little Theatre was also used for ABC radio broadcasts. In 1953, executives of the Ern Westmore Show arranged to broadcast from the Little for six and a half years. Dick Clark's The Dick Clark Show started broadcasting from the Little Theatre in February 1958, remaining there through September 1960. During this time, ABC also broadcast the daytime show Who Do You Trust? with Johnny Carson from the theater.

==== 1960s and 1970s ====
In June 1962, Roger Euster purchased the Little Theatre through his company Little Theatre Inc., beating out several other bidders. The acquisition cost $850,000, part of which the company financed through a stock offering of $294,000. Euster planned to host daily "marathon presentations", with various legitimate plays, impersonations, children's shows, and classic shows running for 17 hours a day. The first new legitimate show at the theater was Tambourines of Glory, a Black revue that opened in November 1963 and closed after a week. Euster opened a bar in the Little's basement and offered free alcoholic beverages to patrons, but the New York City license commissioner quickly halted the practice because the theater had no liquor license. At the end of the year, the Paul Taylor Dance Company performed at the Little. Subsequently, in early 1964, the Habima Theatre of Israel performed three shows at the Little: The Dybbuk, Children of the Shadows, and Each Had Six Wings.

Euster and Leonard Tow sold the theater in June 1964 to Leonard B. Moore and Richard S. Smith. The theater was renamed the Winthrop Ames Theatre that September, when Frank D. Gilroy's play The Subject Was Roses transferred there. According to one media source, Moore "did not want the theater to suffer under the handicap of being called Little any longer". The Subject Was Roses relocated in March 1965, and the theater's name reverted to the Little. Westinghouse Broadcasting paid the producers of The Subject Was Roses to relocate, as it was seeking to lease the theater as a broadcast studio.

At first, Westinghouse taped the syndicated Merv Griffin Show at the Little. By 1969, Merv Griffin moved to another network and the theater was being used for taping The David Frost Show. The 1969–70 season of the game show Beat the Clock, hosted by Jack Narz, was also taped there. A show by psychologist Joyce Brothers was also hosted at the Little Theatre. Amid a general decline in the Times Square neighborhood, the Little Theatre became vacant by mid-1972. The venue stood vacant for six months in 1973, reopening in September as a venue for gay pornographic films. Moore, who claimed he did not know that his tenants were pornographic film exhibitors, quickly halted the film screenings after other theatrical owners protested. In May 1974, Westinghouse Broadcasting acquired the Little Theatre from Moore's company, after Moore defaulted on a mortgage that had been placed on the theater building.

=== Broadway revival ===
==== 1974 to 1989 ====
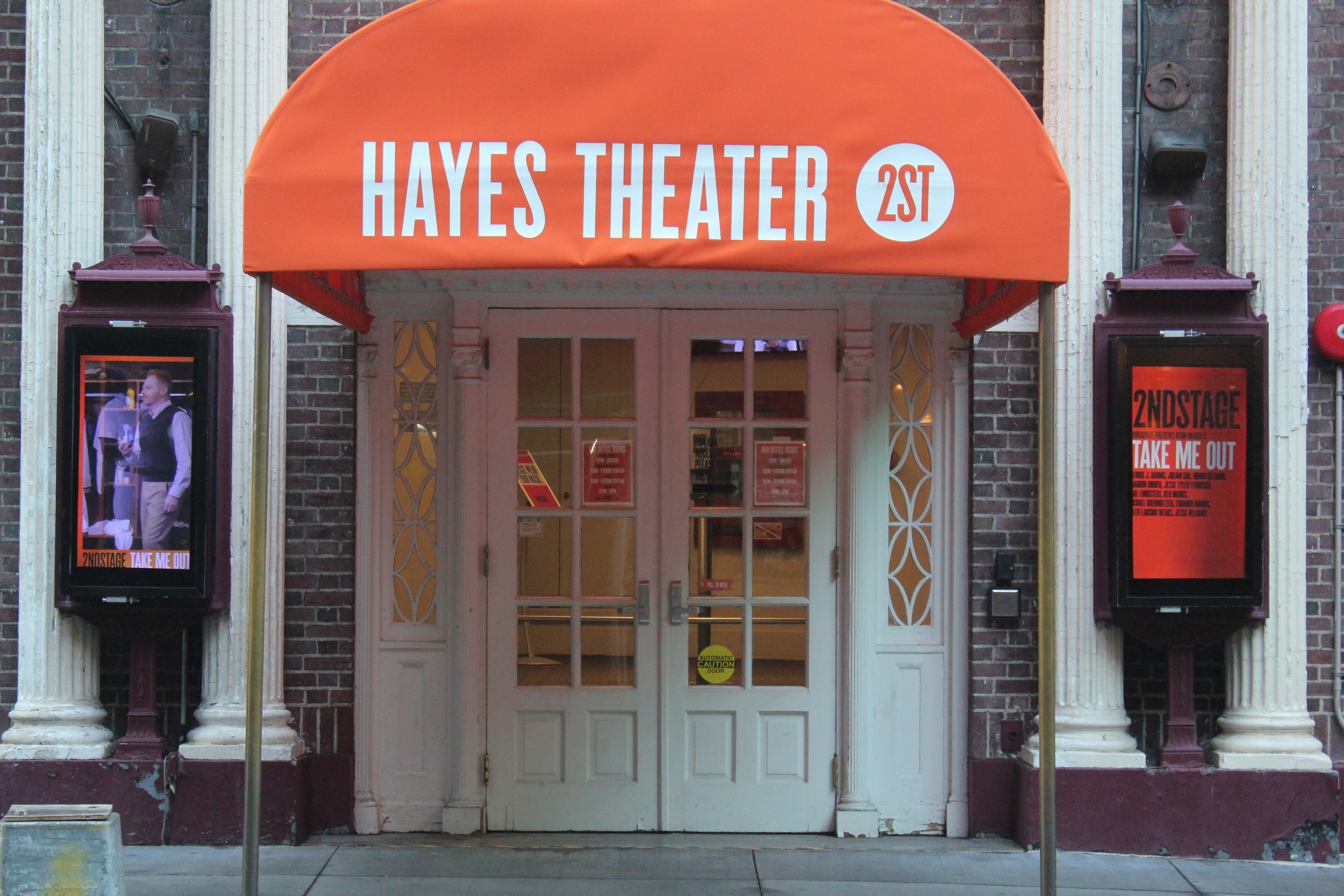
Side view of entrance

The Little Theatre returned to legitimate productions a second time in 1974, when Ray Aranha's My Sister, My Sister opened there. Because of the Little's small size, the Actors' Equity Association gave the theater a special designation, which exempted the theater from some of Actors' Equity's strict rules regarding profits. This was followed in 1975 by the short-lived musical Man on the Moon and the play Lamppost Reunion, as well as in 1976 by a six-month run of The Runner Stumbles. The next hit at the theater was Albert Innaurato's play Gemini, which transferred from off Broadway in 1977 and ran for 1,819 performances over the next four years. (Note: Sometimes cited as 1,788 performances) Westinghouse subsequently sold the theater, but sources dissent on when the sale occurred. According to Ken Bloom and The New York Times, Martin Markinson and Donald Tick bought the theater from Westinghouse in 1979 for $800,000. However, media sources from March 1980 said that the theater had been sold to Ashton Springer for $800,000. Springer's group, known as the Little Theater Group, planned to spend $400,000 to renovate the theater. The firm Adcadesign subsequently renovated the theater in 1981.

In the early 1980s, the Little saw three short runs: Ned and Jack in 1981, as well as The Curse of an Aching Heart and Solomon's Child in 1982. The theater's next hit came in June 1982 when Harvey Fierstein's play Torch Song Trilogy opened; it ran for three years. The Little Theatre was renamed in July 1983 for actress Helen Hayes, who was then 82 years old. Hayes had outlived her previous namesake theater on 46th Street, which had been demolished in 1982 to make way for the New York Marriott Marquis hotel. Ed Koch, then the mayor of New York City, said that Hayes wanted her name on "a small theater" when asked whether she wanted the hotel's new 1,500-seat theater (later the Marquis Theatre) renamed in her honor. After Torch Song Trilogy ended, the Hayes hosted the musical The News, which flopped after four performances in 1985. The next year, the Hayes staged the comedy Corpse!, the mime show Mummenschanz: "The New Show", and the revue Oh, Coward!.

The New York City Landmarks Preservation Commission (LPC) started to consider protecting the Hayes as a landmark in 1982, with discussions continuing over the next several years. The LPC designated the Hayes's facade and part of the interior as landmarks on November 17, 1987. That month, the owners announced that they would auction off the theater at a starting price of $5 million. The New York City Board of Estimate ratified the landmark designations in March 1988. The theater was auctioned the same month; both Jujamcyn Theaters and the Nederlander Organization attended the auction, but there were no bidders. Late in the decade, the Hayes hosted Larry Shue's The Nerd in 1987 and the two-act musical Romance/Romance in 1988. This was followed in 1989 by Mandy Patinkin's Dress Casual and Artist Descending a Staircase.

==== 1990 to 2007 ====
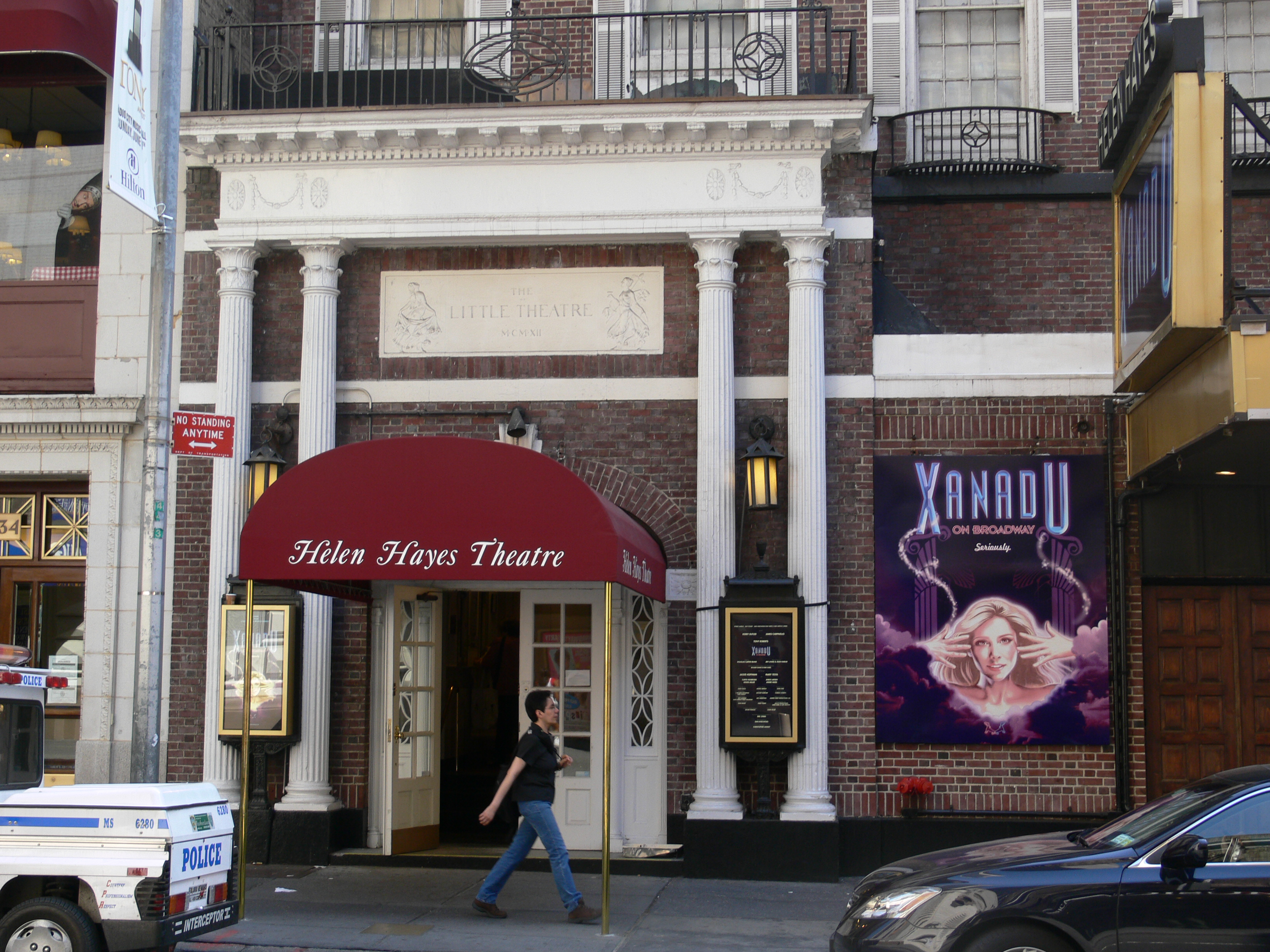
Exterior of the theater as seen in 2007

Premiering at the Helen Hayes Theatre in 1990 were a short run of Estelle Parsons's solo show Miss Margarida's Way, as well as a year-long run of the off-Broadway hit Prelude to a Kiss. The Hayes was remodeled in 1992, and the musical revue The High Rollers Social and Pleasure Club and the musical 3 From Brooklyn were staged the same year. Lynn Redgrave performed her solo show Shakespeare For My Father in 1993, followed the next year by Joan Rivers in Sally Marr...and Her Escorts and a stunt show by The Flying Karamazov Brothers. Rob Becker's monologue Defending the Caveman opened at the Hayes in 1995 and ran for nearly two years. This was followed in 1997 by Alfred Uhry's play The Last Night of Ballyhoo, which had 577 performances before closing. The Hayes's productions at the end of the 1990s included Getting and Spending in 1998, as well as Band in Berlin, Night Must Fall, and Epic Proportions in 1999.

The revue Dirty Blonde opened in 2000 and was a hit. This was followed by Hershey Felder's solo musical tribute George Gershwin Alone and the musical By Jeeves in 2001, as well as the black comedy The Smell of the Kill in 2002. Frank Gorshin performed solo in Say Goodnight Gracie for 364 performances starting in 2002. William Gibson's play Golda's Balcony opened the next year, featuring Tovah Feldshuh, and ran for 493 performances. During 2005, Jackie Mason hosted his comedy Freshly Squeezed at the Hayes, and the Latino comedy revue Latinologues was also presented. The theater's productions in 2006 included Bridge and Tunnel, Kiki & Herb: Alive on Broadway, and Jay Johnson: The Two and Only. The musical Xanadu premiered at the Hayes in 2007 and ran there for 512 performances. While Tick died the same year, his family still co-owned the theater with Markinson.

=== Second Stage ===
==== Sale and continuing productions ====
In July 2008, Markinson and the Tick family indicated their intention to sell the Hayes to Second Stage Theater, which planned to take over the theater in 2010. Second Stage was raising $35 million for both the acquisition and a renovation. In the meantime, Slava's Snowshow had a limited run at the Hayes during the 2008–2009 winter season. The 39 Steps moved to the Hayes in 2009 and ran for a year before relocating off-Broadway. In 2010, Second Stage launched a $45 million capital campaign, with commitments for half that amount, and the theater company was planning to sell the theater's naming rights for $15 million. Pfeiffer Partners had completed plans for a renovation of the theater's interior. The same year, the Hayes staged the play Next Fall, as well as Colin Quinn's one-man show Long Story Short, the latter of which was recorded at the theater as an HBO special. The popular rock musical Rock of Ages transferred to the Hayes in 2011, running there for nearly four years. Rock of Ages achieved the box office record for the Helen Hayes Theatre, grossing $744,667 over nine performances for the week ending December 30, 2012.

After Second Stage finally raised enough money to buy the theater, Tick's family and Markinson requested that the sale be delayed until Rock of Ages closed. In February 2015, Second Stage sued the Hayes's owners for allegedly reneging on the 2008 sale agreement. Second Stage alleged that Tick's family and Markinson were trying to invalidate the sale by rushing the closing process. While the sale was supposed to have been finalized on February 17, Second Stage did not have enough money at that time to cover the $25 million purchase price. By then, the costs of acquiring and renovating the theater had increased to $58 million from $35 million. In response, Markinson said he would sell the theater at the agreed price of $24.7 million if Second Stage could get the money. The dispute was resolved in April 2015, when the sale of the Hayes to Second Stage was finalized. With the sale, Second Stage became one of four nonprofit theater companies to own and operate Broadway theaters. (Note: The Manhattan Theatre Club, Roundabout Theatre Company, and Lincoln Center Theater are the other nonprofits.) Before a planned renovation, the Hayes hosted short runs of the off-Broadway hit Dames at Sea in 2015 and then The Humans in 2016.

==== Renovation and reopening ====
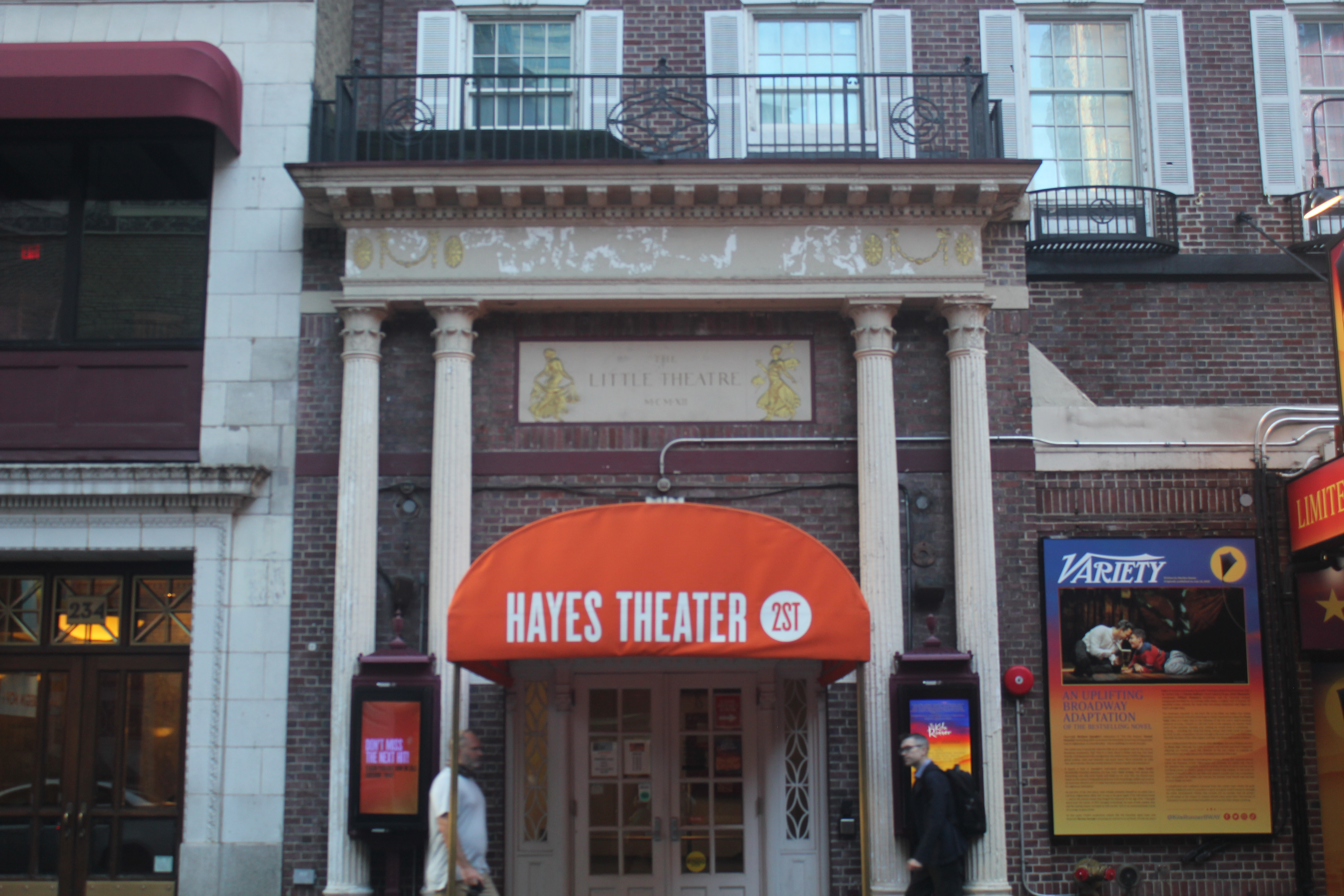
The main entrance seen in 2022

The Humans relocated to another theater in July 2016 to make way for Second Stage's renovation. Second Stage ultimately spent $64 million, including $28 million for the actual purchase, $22 million for renovation, and $14 million for programming. Jordan Roth of Jujamcyn Theaters, which operated the neighboring St. James Theatre, approached Second Stage about the possibility of simultaneously renovating both theaters. Second Stage sold the alley between the theaters to Jujamcyn, which helped Second Stage fund the cost of renovating the Hayes. The Rockwell Group was hired as the architect. The project added an elevator, restrooms, and mechanical systems. In addition, the dressing rooms were relocated from the basement to the third floor, and the basement became a lounge and concession space. As a result of this renovation, the Hayes Theater received a LEED Gold green building certification.

Second Stage planned to host works by living American playwrights, particularly from female and minority writers, at the Hayes Theater. This was a contrast to other Broadway theaters, which often hosted revivals by dead playwrights as well as foreign works. Second Stage's first production at the Hayes was Kenneth Lonergan's Lobby Hero, which opened in March 2018. This was followed the same year by Young Jean Lee's Straight White Men and a revival of Torch Song Trilogy. Subsequently, in 2019, the Hayes hosted Heidi Schreck's What the Constitution Means to Me and Tracy Letts's Linda Vista. After Linda Vista, the Hayes was to have presented two plays in early 2020: Bess Wohl's Grand Horizons and a revival of Richard Greenberg's 2002 play Take Me Out. Grand Horizons was staged from January to March 2020. All Broadway theaters were temporarily closed on March 12, 2020, due to the COVID-19 pandemic, and previews of Take Me Out were delayed.

The Hayes reopened on November 3, 2021, with previews of Clyde's by Lynn Nottage. Take Me Out opened in April 2022, two years after it was first supposed to premiere. This was followed by Matthew Spangler's play The Kite Runner in July 2022 and Stephen Adly Guirgis's play Between Riverside and Crazy in December 2022. Larissa FastHorse's The Thanksgiving Play opened at the Hayes in April 2023, followed by Sandy Rustin's The Cottage in July 2023 and Branden Jacobs-Jenkins's Appropriate in November 2023. Mother Play opened at the Hayes in April 2024 and was followed that July by the play Job. For the 2024–2025 season, the theater hosted Leslye Headland's play Cult of Love starting in November 2024 and Jacobs-Jenkins's play Purpose starting in March 2025. Purpose holds the box office record for the Hayes Theater, grossing $1,020,309 during the week ending August 31, 2025. The Hayes then hosted Jordan Harrison's play Marjorie Prime starting in December 2025, which was followed by Gina Gionfriddo's play Becky Shaw in April 2026. The first Broadway production of The Fantasticks opened in November 2026. This will be followed be the Broadway premiere of Gloria with an opening scheduled for April 2027.

== Notable productions ==
Productions are listed by the year of their first performance.

=== Little Theatre ===
Notable productions at the theater
Opening year	Name	Refs.
1912	The Affairs of Anatol	
1912	Snow White and the Seven Dwarfs	
1912	Rutherford and Son	
1913	The Philanderer	
1914	The Truth	
1918	A Little Journey	
1919	Please Get Married	
1920	Mama's Affair	
1920	Beyond the Horizon	
1920	He and She	
1920	A Midsummer Night's Dream	
1920	The First Year	
1924	Little Jessie James	
1925	The School For Scandal	
1926	Two Girls Wanted	
1927	If	
1928	Gods of the Lightning	
1929	Let Us Be Gay	
1930	London Calling	
1931	Mrs Moonlight	
1933	One Sunday Afternoon	
1934	The Lady from the Sea	
1937	Abie's Irish Rose	
1941	Twelfth Night	
1964	The Dybbuk	
1964	The Subject Was Roses	
1975	Man On The Moon	
1976	The Runner Stumbles	
1977	A Party with Betty Comden & Adolph Green	
1977	Gemini	
1982	Torch Song Trilogy	

=== Helen Hayes Theatre (1983–2017) ===
Notable productions at the theater
Opening year	Name	Refs.
1985	The News	
1986	Mummenschanz: "The New Show"	
1986	Oh, Coward!	
1987	The Nerd	
1988	Romance/Romance	
1989	Mandy Patinkin in Concert: "Dress Casual"	
1989	Artist Descending a Staircase	
1990	Miss Margarida's Way	
1990	Prelude to a Kiss	
1993	Shakespeare For My Father	
1994	The Flying Karamazov Brothers "Do The Impossible"	
1995	Defending the Caveman	
1997	The Last Night of Ballyhoo	
1999	Night Must Fall	
1999	Epic Proportions	
2000	Dirty Blonde	
2001	George Gershwin Alone	
2001	By Jeeves	
2002	The Smell of the Kill	
2002	Say Goodnight, Gracie	
2003	Golda's Balcony	
2005	Jackie Mason: Freshly Squeezed	
2005	Latinologues	
2006	Bridge and Tunnel	
2006	Kiki & Herb: Alive on Broadway	
2006	Jay Johnson: The Two and Only	
2007	Xanadu	
2008	Slava's Snowshow	
2009	The 39 Steps	
2010	Next Fall	
2010	Long Story Short	
2011	Rock of Ages	
2015	Dames at Sea	
2016	The Humans	

=== Hayes Theater (Second Stage) ===
Notable productions at the theater
Opening year	Name	Refs.
2018	Lobby Hero	
2018	Straight White Men	
2018	Torch Song	
2019	What the Constitution Means to Me	
2019	Linda Vista	
2020	Grand Horizons	
2021	Clyde's	
2022	Take Me Out	
2022	Kite Runner	
2022	Between Riverside and Crazy	
2023	The Thanksgiving Play	
2023	The Cottage	
2023	Appropriate	
2024	Mother Play	
2024	Job	
2024	Cult of Love	
2025	Purpose	
2025	Marjorie Prime	
2026	Becky Shaw	
2026	The Fantasticks	
2027	Gloria	

== See also ==
- List of Broadway theaters
- List of New York City Designated Landmarks in Manhattan from 14th to 59th Streets
