= The Thanksgiving Play =

2015 comedy play by Larissa FastHorse

- Original language: English
- Written by: Larissa FastHorse
- Genre: Satire

Premiere
- Date: April 1, 2018
- Place: Artists Repertory Theatre

The Thanksgiving Play is a satirical comedy written by Larissa FastHorse. The play centers around a group of four well-meaning but culturally insensitive white theater artists who attempt to create a politically correct elementary school play about the first Thanksgiving while struggling with their own biases and the lack of Native American representation.

In 2018, the play had its world premiere at the Artists Repertory Theatre, in Portland, Oregon. It then made its off-Broadway debut at the Peter Jay Sharp Theater in 2018. In 2023, The Thanksgiving Play premiered on Broadway at the Hayes Theater.

== Premise ==
The Thanksgiving Play follows four white individuals who are determined to create a politically correct First Thanksgiving play for Native American Heritage Month in schools. Logan, the director, hires an actress named Alicia, believing she is Native American, to provide cultural authenticity. However, it is soon revealed that Alicia is actually white and only portrays Native American characters when not playing other ethnicities.

Without an authentic Native voice, Logan and her team – which includes her partner Jaxton, an overly earnest actor, and Caden, an enthusiastic yet clueless history teacher – are forced to confront the complexities of privilege while adhering to historical accuracy and school district rules. Meanwhile, they begin to understand the challenges of performative activism and of trying to address cultural issues without genuine understanding.

== Production history ==
In 2015, FastHorse began writing the play after having received a fellowship from the Tyrone Guthrie Centre in Ireland. After this, the play had developmental readings and workshops at U.C. Berkeley, the Artists Repertory Theatre, and in the Play Lab at Center Stage in Baltimore.

The play had its world premiere at the Artists Repertory Theatre followed by the California premier at Capital Stage in Sacramento, California before its off-Broadway production at Playwrights Horizons in New York City in 2018. Subsequent workshops and productions took place in Minneapolis and Los Angeles. The play was one of the most produced regional productions in the 2019-2020 season.

The Thanksgiving Play opened on Broadway at the Hayes Theater. It began performances, in previews, on March 25, 2023, before officially opening on April 20, 2023. The limited engagement production closed on June 4, 2023. It was directed by Rachel Chavkin and starred Katie Finneran, Scott Foley, D'Arcy Carden, and Chris Sullivan. This production marked the first time that a female Native American playwright had a play produced on Broadway.

== Cast and characters ==
=== Cast ===
Character	World Premiere	Off-Broadway	Broadway
Character	2018		2023
Logan	Sarah Lucht	Jennifer Bareilles	Katie Finneran
Caden	Chris Harder	Jeffrey Bean	Chris Sullivan
Jaxton	Michael O’Connell	Greg Keller	Scott Foley
Alicia	Claire Rigsby	Margo Seibert	D'Arcy Carden

=== Characters ===
The play has four characters:

- Logan: a high school drama teacher desperate to save her job by creating a culturally sensitive Thanksgiving play.
- Caden: an elementary school history teacher helping Logan maintain historical accuracy in the play.
- Jaxton: Logan's yoga instructor boyfriend who is overly concerned with political correctness.
- Alicia: a professional actress hired to provide Indigenous perspective, but is not actually Indigenous herself.

== Main ideas ==
The main ideas explored in The Thanksgiving Play involve the attempt of an all-white cast to create a respectful and politically correct Thanksgiving play that includes Native American themes. This idea is paradoxical, considering the play is written by a Native American playwright. Larissa FastHorse wrote the play in response to the common notion that her works couldn't be produced due to the perceived difficulty in finding Native American actors. To challenge this casting limitation, FastHorse crafted a play that tackles Native American issues without relying on Native American actors.

In the play, white characters take on the task of writing and producing a play about Native Americans without consulting them directly, highlighting the complexities and impossibilities of the endeavor. The play sheds light on issues such as the underrepresentation of indigenous actors, misguided attempts to represent Native Americans in American society, the presumption of a homogenous Native American identity instead of recognizing diverse tribal identities, and other challenges faced by indigenous people in America.

Through its satirical tone, The Thanksgiving Play humorously delves into the conflict of creating a politically correct portrayal of Thanksgiving without involving Native Americans. Beneath the humor and satire, the play subtly critiques the historical and ongoing misrepresentation of Native Americans by referencing past portrayals involving redface and the inaccurate portrayal of indigenous culture.

== Awards and nominations ==
=== Broadway production ===
Year	Award	Category	Nominee	Result	Ref.
2023	Drama League Awards	Outstanding Revival of a Play		Nominated	
2023	Drama League Awards	Distinguished Performance	D'Arcy Carden	Nominated	
2023	Theatre World Awards	Outstanding Debut Performance	D'Arcy Carden	Won	
