= Roberta Arnold =

American actress (1896–1966)

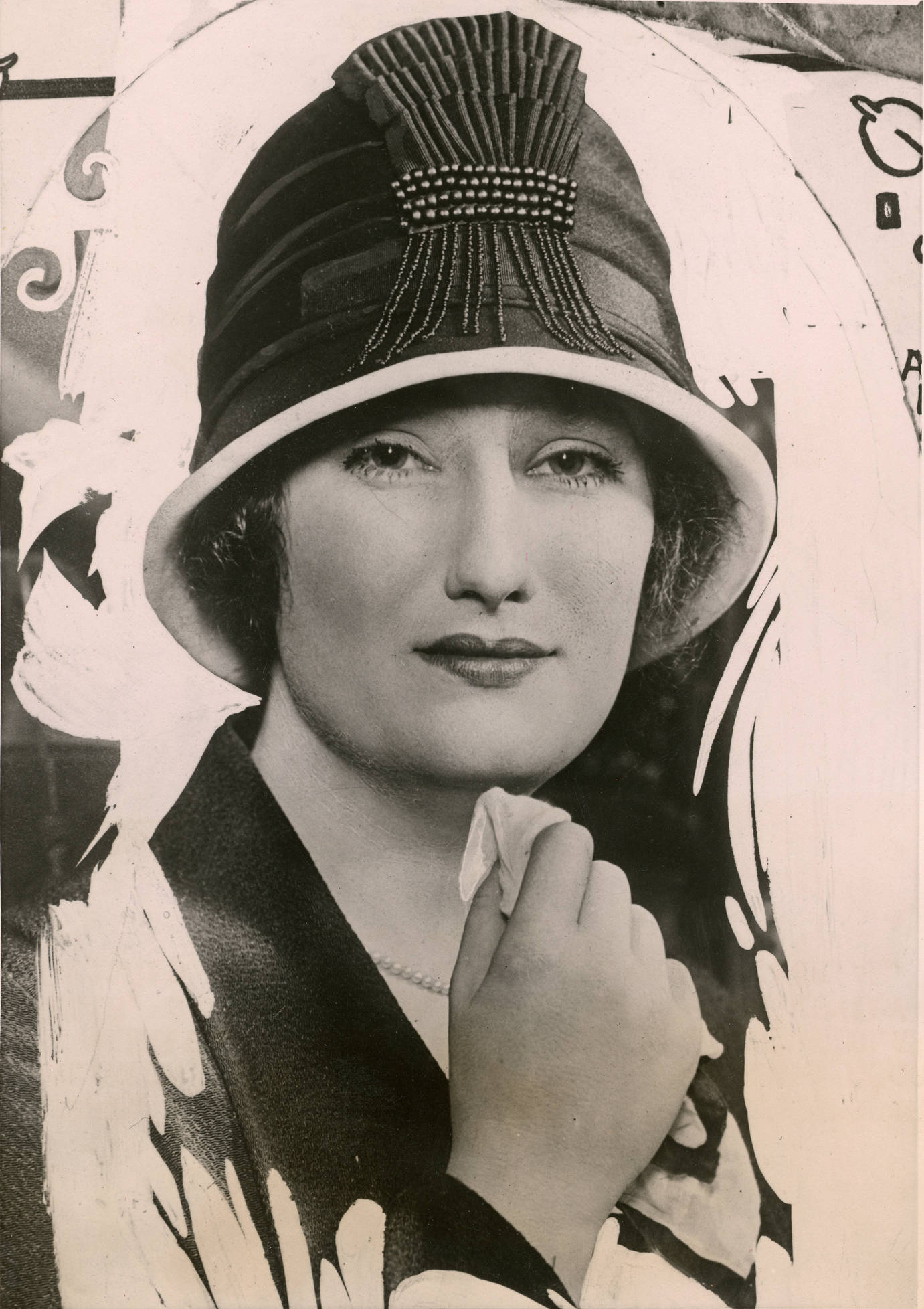
- Born: Minerva Bussenius; September 22, 1896; San Francisco, California, U.S.
- Died: August 27, 1966 (aged 69); Los Angeles, California, U.S.
- Other names: Minerva B Willard, Roberta Arnold Willard
- Occupation: Actress

Minerva Bussenius (September 22, 1896 – August 27, 1966), known professionally as Roberta Arnold, was an American stage and silent film actress. She started in Los Angeles before moving to New York, appeared in leading roles in several Broadway plays and received positive reception.

== Career ==
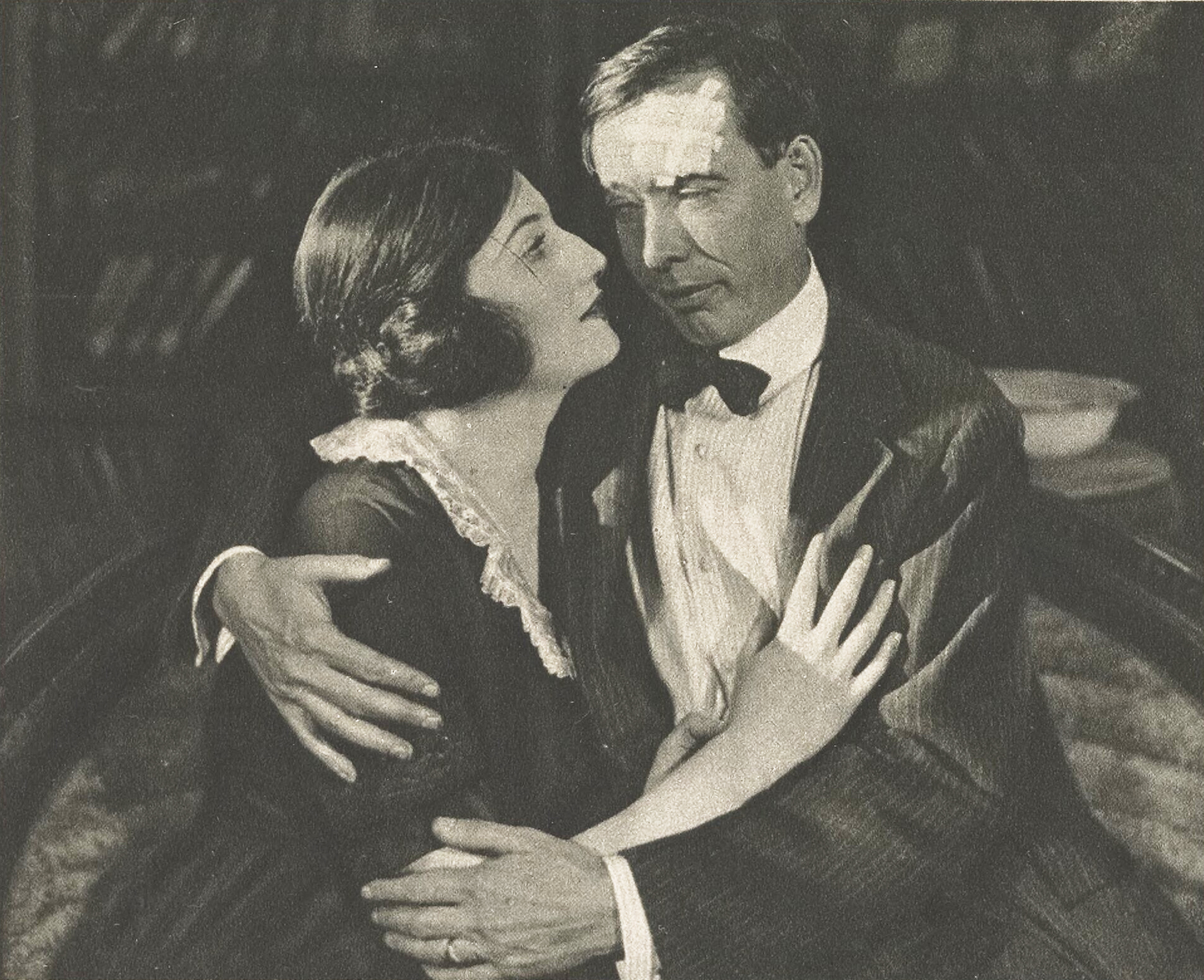
Arnold with Frank Craven in The First Year

She made her professional debut around age 17 in 1910 at the Los Angeles Belasco Theatre, as a non-speaking extra in a production of Forty-five Minutes from Broadway. She joined Oliver Morosco's stock company, where her productions included Peg o' My Heart and The Bird of Paradise supporting Carlotta Monterey. She had a part in Upstairs and Down (1916) which was the most popular Los Angeles play of the season before coming to New York, marking Arnold's Broadway debut.

She had leading roles in Adam and Eva (1919), and in The First Year, opposite Frank Craven who also wrote it. She played her role, Grace Livingston, for more than a year, and said of the character, "Grace Livingston, as created by Mr. Craven, is human and real – a genuine person". Her other roles included in Chicken Feed, and Pig Iron. Her role in the 1925 play Pig Iron was said by the San Francisco Examiner to be "the opportunity of her career". She was in the silent film Sands of Life.

== Reception ==
The magazine The Independent wrote that Arnold is a corker and that the "subtle little meanings she makes her lines suggest sets the comedy down in The School for Scandal class." Time wrote of Arnold, "You either like her or you don't. Most people do."

== Personal life ==
Arnold was born Minerva Bussenius in San Francisco, California, and moved to Los Angeles as an infant. Her father was a Southern California businessman and her mother was an officer in the Native Daughters of the Golden West. She took the name Roberta Arnold feeling her original name "too great a handicap on stage" so she used the first name of her father (Robert) and the name of an uncle (Arnold). She wanted to be an actress since she was 7 years old. She spent her childhood with her parents in Los Angeles. Arnold kept a scrapbook of pictures that had to do with theatre when she was a child, with it later becoming an inspiration to her and her "most precious possession". Her parents thought that she was not serious about becoming an actress. When she was 14 years old, Arnold made the announcement that she "was going to be an actress" and her mother burned her scrapbook in a bonfire as a result. Her sister Carolyn also acted briefly under the name Carolyn Arnold, before marrying a French nobleman.

She married actor Herbert Rawlinson on January 1, 1912. In 1922, her husband sued her for desertion and they became divorced. She later married aviator and stunt pilot Frank J. Lynch, whom she divorced in 1927, and in 1929 she married the playwright and screenwriter John Willard. She died in August 1966, and was interred in Forest Lawn Memorial Park, Glendale.
