= Latinologues =

Play written by Rick Najera

- Written by: Rick Najera

Premiere
- Date: October 13, 2005
- Place: Helen Hayes Theatre
- Directed by: Cheech Marin
- Official website

Latinologues is a play written by Rick Najera and directed by Cheech Marin. It is structured as a series of monologues that highlights stereotypes about. The long running play has performed throughout the US, including Los Angeles, San Diego, Denver, Miami and Chicago. Its cast has included Esai Morales, María Conchita Alonso, Fernando Carrillo, Jacob Vargas, and soap actress Cynthia Klitbo.

It opened on Broadway at the Helen Hayes Theatre on October 13, 2005. The opening night cast consisted of Eugenio Derbez, Rene Lavan, Rick Najera and Shirley A. Rumierk. Lighting design by Kevin Adams, assisted by Aaron Sporer. Costume Design by Santiago, assisted by Jonathan Solari. The Stage Manager was Arabella Powell.

Latinologues closed on Broadway on December 31, 2005, after 93 performances and 34 previews.
