= Frederic B. Vogel =

American actor

Frederic B. Vogel (March 20, 1926 - November 29, 2005) was an American theatre producer, educator, actor, and founder of the Commercial Theater Institute, as well as the Federation for the Extension and Development of the American Professional Theatre.

Frederic B. Vogel was born in Philadelphia. He created the Commercial Theater Institute in 1982, the first workshop ever conducted to train producers for commercial Broadway, off-Broadway, and road productions. These workshops have included seminar leaders including producers, general managers, theater owners, press agents, literary agents, theatrical attorneys, etc., in the commercial theater. Over fifty participants in these programs have gone on to produce with distinction On and Off-Broadway.

Having invested in over fifty Broadway and off-Broadway productions, Vogel co-produced the Tony Award-nominated Marlene, and co-produced the Lucille Lortel Award winning "Shakespeare’s R&J" off-Broadway, R.T. Robinson’s The Cover of Life in the fall of 1994 at the American Place Theater, as well as co-produced the off-Broadway musical Lust in June 1995. For seventeen years, Mr. Vogel headed FEDAPT (The Foundation for the Extension and Development of the American Professional Theater), which offered development and technical assistance to over 500 theaters, dance organizations, performing arts centers, and other arts projects throughout the United States.

Prior to this, Vogel was the assisting director for the Performing Arts Division at the 1962 Seattle World's Fair, which presented more than 125 international theatrical and concert attractions. He supervised the International Special Events Program and served as the director of the Film Program, which premiered films from all over the world. Mr. Vogel subsequently was appointed special events director for the New York State Commission on the World’s Fair for the New York Pavilion at the World’s Fair, a position he held from 1963-65. As general manager for Lumadrama (a son e lumiere) at Independence Hall in Philadelphia, Pennsylvania, Mr. Vogel coordinated this tourist and educational program with the U.S. Department of the Interior and was responsible for its operation.

Beginning his theatrical career as an actor at the age of nine, Vogel appeared in Broadway, off-Broadway, the summer stock circuit, television, and film before switching his creative priorities to the front office. He has held administrative positions in summer theatre, music events, off-Broadway, and created and supervised Broadway Theatre Leagues (Columbia Artists Management) throughout the U.S. For several years Mr. Vogel served as an independent arts management consultant for a variety of organizations. Additionally, he has been a stage manager, box office treasurer, subscription, and group sales manager, publicity director, general manager, and producer. He has lectured at leading universities, arts management programs throughout the United States, and has served as an arts consultant for the Ford Foundation in Indonesia. In 2003, he produced and distributed the independent film, A Tale of Two Pizzas.

His definitive publication, The Commercial Theater Institute Guide to Producing Plays and Musicals, co-edited by Theatre World editor Ben Hodges, was published by Applause Theatre and Cinema Books in 2007, and is considered the definitive reference in the field of commercial theater producing.

He died on November 29, 2005, at his home in New York City, of complications from lung cancer.
