= Larissa FastHorse =

American dramatist

Larissa FastHorse is a Native American (Sicangu Lakota) playwright and choreographer based in Santa Monica, California. In 2023, she became the first known female Native American playwright produced on Broadway with The Thanksgiving Play at Second Stage’s Hayes Theater. That same year, she joined Arizona State University as a professor of practice in the Arizona Center for Medieval and Renaissance Studies and the Department of English with long-time collaborators, Michael John Garcés and Ty Defoe. In 2024, Peter Pan: The Broadway Musical with an adapted book by FastHorse began an international tour.

FastHorse grew up in South Dakota, where she began her career as a ballet dancer and choreographer but was forced into retirement after ten years of dancing due to an injury. Returning to an early interest in writing, she became involved in Native American drama, especially the Native American film community. Later she began writing and directing her own plays, several of which are published through Samuel French (a Concord Theatricals Company) and Dramatic Publishing. With playwright and performer Ty Defoe, FastHorse co-founded Indigenous Direction, a "consulting firm that helps organizations and individuals who want to create accurate work by, for, and with Indigenous peoples." Indigenous Direction's clients include Macy's Thanksgiving Day Parade and the Guthrie Theater. FastHorse is a past vice chair of the Theatre Communications Group, a service organization for professional non-profit American theatre, and current vice chair of the board of directors for Playwrights Horizons.

== Career ==
In 2000, FastHorse was a delegate to the United Nations in Geneva, where she spoke on the impact cinema can have for Indigenous peoples. FastHorse then shifted from her career as a dancer and choreographer, to feature television and film development and theater.

FastHorse has created a trilogy of "community engaged" plays with Michael John Garcés and Cornerstone Theater Company. The first was Urban Rez, which portrayed the experience of Indigenous people in Los Angeles County, home to the U.S.'s second-largest Indigenous population. The second project, Native Nation, was the largest Indigenous theater production in the history of American theater with over 400 Native artists involved in the productions in association with ASU Gammage. Wicoun was the third play in the series and, according to FastHorse, explored the strength, beauty, humor, and perseverance culture, language and identity of the Northern Plains Indigenous people. FastHorse's "radical inclusion process" with Indigenous tribes has been honored with prestigious national arts funding from MacArthur, Creative Capital, MAP Fund, NEFA, First People's Fund, the NEA Our Town Grant, Mellon Foundation, Doris Duke Charitable Foundation and others.

In the 2022–23 season, FastHorse made her Broadway debut with her satirical comedy The Thanksgiving Play. This made her in 2023 the first female Native American playwright to have a play produced on Broadway. The play began through a fellowship from the Guthrie Theater and was developed through numerous readings including at DC's Center Stage Play Lab in 2016. It was produced by Artists Repertory Theatre in Oregon in April 2018 and had its off-Broadway debut in October 2018 at Playwrights Horizons. The Playwrights Horizons production was directed by Moritz von Stuelpnagel and starred Margo Seibert, Jennifer Bareilles, Jeffrey Bean, and Greg Keller. The Thanksgiving Play has been one of the top ten most produced plays in America since 2019; FastHorse is the first Native American playwright in the history of American theater on that list. FastHorse was also one of the top twenty most produced playwrights of the 2023–24 season.

Both The Thanksgiving Play in 2017 and FastHorse's play What Would Crazy Horse Do? in 2014 were featured on the annual "Kilroys' List" of "recommended un- and underproduced new plays by female and trans authors of color." What Would Crazy Horse Do?, a comedy inspired by historical events in which the KKK attempted to recruit Indigenous groups, was featured in the Lilly Awards' 2015 reading series with performers Emily Bergl, Jesse Perez, and Madeline Sayet.

Some of FastHorse's other recent projects include developing a new production for The Guthrie, For The People, and a new production of the beloved Jerome Robbins Broadway musical, Peter Pan.

At The Guthrie, For The People (2023) was created through a hybrid community engagement/traditional new play process with an open rehearsal room to allow for community feedback and was still a full production on the subscription season.

Through FastHorse's revised book, the new production of Peter Pan readdresses the play's depiction of Native Americans as it embarks on an international tour in 2024. Some of FastHorse's produced plays in the past have included What Would Crazy Horse Do? (KCRep), Landless and Cow Pie Bingo (AlterTheater), Average Family (Children's Theater Company of Minneapolis), Teaching Disco Square Dancing to Our Elders: a Class Presentation (Native Voices at the Autry Museum of the American West), Vanishing Point (Eagle Project), and Cherokee Family Reunion (Mountainside Theater).

FastHorse has written commissioned pieces for The Public, Second Stage, Center Theater Group, AlterTheater, Cornerstone Theatre Company, Native Voices at the Autry, Children's Theatre Company, the Kennedy Center for Young Audiences, and Mountainside Theater. Additional theaters that have developed plays with FastHorse include Yale Rep, The Guthrie, Geffen Playhouse, History Theater, Baltimore's Center Stage, Arizona Theatre Company, Mixed Blood, Perseverance Theater Company, The Lark Playwrights Week, and Berkeley Rep's Ground Floor.

In 2019, FastHorse entered film and television with a series at Freeform, a movie for Disney Channel, and a series for NBC. Since then she has been in development for projects with Apple TV+, Taylor Made Productions, Echo Lake, DreamWorks, and Netflix. Before working in theater, FastHorse began her writer training as a Sundance Native Feature Fellow, Fox Diversity Fellow, ABC Native American Fellow, and an intern at Universal Pictures. FastHorse has produced two short films: The Migration (2008) and A Final Wish (2002). She also served as a creative executive for Latham Entertainment at Paramount.

In 2020, FastHorse's company with Ty Defoe, Indigenous Direction, produced the first land acknowledgement on national television for the Macy's Thanksgiving Day Parade on NBC. Indigenous Direction's other clients include Roundabout Theater Company, American Association of Arts Presenters (APAP), Western Arts Alliance, Guthrie, Oregon Shakespeare Festival, Brown University, and more.

In 2023, she became the first female Native American playwright to have a play produced on Broadway, with her play called The Thanksgiving Play.

As a playwright, FastHorse requests that theaters who produce her work hire at least one other Indigenous artist for the production, and showcase at least one other Indigenous artist's work in the building.

== Honors and awards ==
- MacArthur Fellows Program, Class of 2020
- PEN/Laura Pels International Foundation for Theater Award, 2019
- PEN Center USA Literary Award for Drama, 2016
- Playwrights’ Center Core Writer, 2016–2018
- Center Stage "Wright Now Play Later" Project, 2016
- Joe Dowling Annaghmakerrig Fellowship Award, 2015–2016
- Directors Lab West, 2015
- AATE Distinguished Play Award, 2012
- Center Theatre Group L.A. Writers' Workshop, 2011–2012
- Speaker and Workshop Leader, South Dakota Festival of Books, 2011
- National Endowment for the Arts Distinguished New Play Development Grant, 2010
- William Inge Center for the Arts Playwriting Residency, 2009
- Speaker, International Colloquium of Theatre for Young People, Mexico City, 2009
- Featured US playwright, ASSITEJ World Congress, Australia, 2008
- National Geographic Seed Grant, 2007
- Aurand Harris Fellowship, Children's Theatre Foundation of America, 2007
- ABC / IAIA TV Writer's Track Program, 2007
- Fox TV Writers Initiative Fellow, 2008–2009 / 2005–2006
- Fellowship, Fox Diversity Writer's Initiative Programs, 2006
- Inscribed Delegate, United Nations, Geneva, Switzerland, 2000
- Sundance Institute-Ford Foundation Fellowship
- Two for New Works Grant
- Guggenheim Fellowship, 2025

== Television and film credits ==
- Queen of America, NBCUniversal, 2021
- Buffalo County, co-writer with Courtney Hoffman at Must, 2020
- The Line (pilot; Fox)
- Lakota Falls (pilot; Teen Nick)

== Theatre credits ==
=== Choreography and direction ===
- Our Voices Will Be Heard, Perseverance Theater, Juneau/Anchorage, AK, 2016
- South Pass, Jackson Center for the Arts, Jackson, WY, 2013
- Unto These Hills, Mountainside Theatre, Cherokee, NC, 2008–2011

=== Writing ===
- Fancy Dancer (2025)
- Fake It Until You Make It (2025)
- The Thanksgiving Play (2023)
- Wicoun (2023)
- Native Nation (2019)
- Cow Pie Bingo (2018)
- What Would Crazy Horse Do? (2017)
- Urban Rez (2016)
- Allies – My America Too (2015)
- Landless (2015)
- Cherokee Family Reunion (2012)
- Hunka (2012)
- A Dancing People (2011)
- Different Does Not Mean The Same (2009)
- Serra Springs (2008)
- Teaching Disco Square Dancing to Our Elders: A Class Presentation (2008)
- Average Family (2007)

== Personal ==
FastHorse is a member of the Rosebud Sioux Tribe of the Lakota people. She lives with her husband, sculptor Edd Hogan, in Santa Monica.
