= Hacks season 1 =

Hacks
- Season 1
- Promotional poster
- Starring: Jean Smart; Hannah Einbinder; Carl Clemons-Hopkins
- No. of episodes: 10

Release
- Original network: HBO Max
- Original release: May 13 – June 10, 2021

Season chronology
- Next → Season 2

The first season of American dark comedy drama streaming series Hacks debuted on May 13, 2021, on HBO Max. The series was co-created by Lucia Aniello, Paul W. Downs, and Jen Statsky. Starring Jean Smart and Hannah Einbinder, the season follows two comedians from different generations who forge a working relationship. Season one received critical acclaim and earned accolades including Primetime Emmy Awards for directing, writing, and acting (for Smart).

== Cast ==
=== Main ===
- Jean Smart as Deborah Vance, a revered Las Vegas stand-up comedian decades into her career
- Hannah Einbinder as Ava Daniels, a 25-year-old down-on-her-luck comedy writer forced to leave Los Angeles and work with Deborah Vance
- Carl Clemons-Hopkins as Marcus, the loyal workaholic COO of Deborah's company

=== Recurring ===
- Kaitlin Olson as Deborah "DJ" Vance Jr., Deborah's daughter who sells personal crafts
- Chris McDonald as Marty Ghilain, CEO of the Palmetto Casino
- Paul W. Downs as Jimmy LuSaque Jr., Deborah and Ava's manager
- Rose Abdoo as Josefina, Deborah's house manager
- Lorenza Izzo as Ruby, Ava's ex-girlfriend and an actress
- Megan Stalter as Kayla Schaeffer, Jimmy's inept assistant and boss's daughter
- Mark Indelicato as Damien, Deborah's personal assistant
- Poppy Liu as Kiki, Deborah's personal blackjack dealer and an employee at the Palmetto
- Johnny Sibilly as Wilson, a Vegas public water inspector and Marcus' love interest
- Angela E. Gibbs as Robin, Marcus' mother
- Jane Adams as Nina Daniels, Ava's mother
- Louis Herthum as Dennis Daniels, Ava's father who is recovering from a stroke
- Amanda Payton as Jackie, one of DJ's friends
- Joe Mande as Ray, a front desk clerk at the Palmetto
- Danielle Schneider as Rina, Marty's assistant
- Lauren Weedman as Jo Pezzimenti, the mayor of Las Vegas

=== Guest ===
- Ally Maki as Taylor, a television producer and Ava's acquaintance
- Jefferson Mays as T. L. Gurley, an antique dealer with a grudge against Deborah
- Brent Sexton as Michael Schaeffer, Jimmy's boss and Kayla's father
- Guy Branum as a fan of Deborah's
- Jennifer Irwin as one of DJ's friends
- Vinessa Vidotto as Ivy, Marty's younger girlfriend
- Jeff Ward as George, a man Ava meets at the Palmetto
- Madeline Zima and Rekha Shankar as Jules and Victoria, successful writers and Ava's former colleagues
- Luenell as Miss Loretta, Robin's best friend
- Iris Bahr as Perla, a nurse at a medical spa for cosmetic surgery
- Brandon Keener as an ER doctor
- Paul Felder as Aidan, an MMA fighter and DJ's fiancé
- Blake Clark as the marriage officiant at a drive-thru wedding chapel
- Anna Maria Horsford as Frenchie, a veteran comedian and an old friend of Deborah's
- Linda Purl as Kathy Vance, Deborah's estranged sister
- Adam Ray as Drew Higgins, a comedian and the host at the Ha Ha comedy club
- Nelson Franklin as an interviewer
- Chris Geere and Kirby Howell-Baptiste as Jesse and Daisy, British TV producers who interview Ava

== Episodes ==
No. overall	No. in season	Title	Directed by	Written by	Original release date
1	1	"There Is No Line"	Lucia Aniello	Lucia Aniello & Paul W. Downs & Jen Statsky	May 13, 2021
Deborah Vance, a legendary standup comedian with a permanent residency at the Palmetto Casino in Las Vegas, learns that her ex-husband Frank – who left her for her younger sister decades earlier – has died. The day before, Deborah had been informed by Marty, the Palmetto's CEO, that her weekend tour dates are being given to new acts in an attempt to attract younger audiences. An incensed Deborah calls her manager, Jimmy, who suggests she hire a writer. Though Deborah declines, saying that she writes her own jokes, Jimmy offers the job to Ava Daniels, a struggling comic from Los Angeles who has recently lost a lucrative TV deal after making an offensive joke on Twitter. Ava flies to Las Vegas to meet Deborah, who is unaware of her arrival; the meeting quickly turns hostile, with the two women trading barbed yet comedic retorts before Ava leaves, put off by Deborah's arrogant behavior. However, Deborah, impressed with Ava's comic ability, hires her.
2	2	"Primm"	Lucia Aniello	Paul W. Downs	May 13, 2021
When Deborah does not use any of the material Ava has written for her, Ava claims it is difficult to write in Deborah's voice without knowing her personally. Deborah suggests that the two take a road trip, which Ava learns is only for Deborah to procure an expensive pepper shaker from an antique dealer who hates her; the dealer refuses to sell the shaker unless Deborah apologizes for outbidding him years earlier on an expensive collection, which she refuses to do. On the way home, Deborah's car suffers a flat tire; she has a friend pick her up in a helicopter, leaving Ava behind. Ava gets a faulty tire replacement and returns to the antique store, where she acquires the pepper shaker by threatening to break one of the other items in the dealer's shop. Deborah is pleasantly surprised that Ava was able to procure the shaker. She later tasks Ava with digitizing her entire archive, comprising 40 years' worth of Deborah's performances.
3	3	"A Gig's a Gig"	Lucia Aniello	Lucia Aniello	May 20, 2021
At the opening of a new pizza restaurant, Deborah is asked to do a photo op that references her burning down her ex-husband's house decades earlier. When Ava tells her it is degrading, Deborah feels insulted, and retaliates by going on a tour bus and publicly making fun of Ava for sending nude photos to her ex-girlfriend. While sorting through Deborah's archive, Ava opens a package from Deborah's sister Kathy that she finds in the trash. She discovers old clippings from Deborah's early career, including a Time cover story regarding her upcoming, but ultimately unaired pilot for a late-night talk show (which would have made Deborah the first female late-night host). Ava finds a tape of the unaired show and laughs at Deborah's jokes for the first time while watching the video, becoming emotional when a young Deborah thanks her husband and sister for their support. She is unaware that Deborah is eavesdropping on her, before quietly slipping away.
4	4	"D'Jewelry"	Desiree Akhavan	Joanna Calo	May 20, 2021
After Deborah refuses to pitch her daughter DJ's jewelry line to QVC, Ava goes with DJ to a trade show and the two bond over their mutual resentment. Ava learns that DJ pays paparazzi to take unflattering photos of her mother to sell, then discovers that Deborah allows it to happen so DJ can earn a living. Deborah and her manager Marcus go to Marty's daughter's bat mitzvah, where Deborah tries and fails to convince Marty not to cut her dates. Marty and Deborah drink together and nearly kiss, but Marty's young girlfriend Ivy walks in. Deborah flatters her into secretly giving her a tour of Marty's home while taking photos of Marty's art and possessions. Later, Ava calls her mother to finally come clean about having lost her television deal but hangs up when her mother panics about Ava's financial stability. Once Ava returns to the hotel, Deborah calls her to ask about her hotel bills, and they end up watching TV together over the phone and making jokes.
5	5	"Falling"	Paul W. Downs	Andrew Law	May 27, 2021
Deborah uses the photos of Marty's possessions – which he paid for using company funds – to blackmail him into restoring her weekend tour dates. She then spends the night getting drunk at the casino bar rather than working on her comedy material. Ava meets a man, George, with whom she instantly bonds; the two spend the night taking drugs, exploring Las Vegas, and having sex. They also run into Ava's former writing partners, who inform her no one wants to work with her not because of her offensive tweet, but because she is selfish. George convinces Ava to stop working for Deborah; an intoxicated Ava leaves a voicemail for Deborah announcing she is quitting. The following morning, Ava finds that George committed suicide by jumping from the hotel window; authorities inform her George was escaping elder fraud charges and spent the last of his money in Las Vegas before killing himself. Ava decides to keep her job and frantically rushes to Deborah's home to apologize for the voicemail but learns that Deborah did not use her phone all night. Deborah has Ava join her for a spa retreat.
6	6	"New Eyes"	Lucia Aniello	Lucia Aniello & Paul W. Downs & Jen Statsky	May 27, 2021
While Deborah is unconscious from painkillers she receives for cosmetic surgery at the retreat, Ava attempts to unlock her phone to delete the incriminating voicemail. Ava learns that Deborah's phone is unlocked via facial recognition; when the camera fails to recognize Deborah due to her swollen, bandaged face, Ava uses Deborah's wax replica at Madame Tussauds to unlock the phone and delete the voicemail. Upon returning to the spa, Ava takes edibles with Deborah. While high, Deborah admits that Frank fabricated the claim that Deborah burned down his house out of jealousy for cheating on her with Kathy, and that she incorporated the rumor into her comedy routine after the public refused to believe her pleas of innocence. Ava encourages Deborah to update her comedy material by sharing the truth about not just the fire, but who she really is. Ava suffers abdominal pain and winds up in the hospital with a ruptured ovarian cyst. When she awakens, Deborah agrees to slowly make her comedy more reflective of the truth; she and Ava laugh together as Deborah shares other stories.
7	7	"Tunnel of Love"	Desiree Akhavan	Katherine Kearns	June 3, 2021
Ava and Deborah attend DJ's birthday party, during which DJ announces her engagement to Aidan, a mixed martial artist she recently met. Things go well until dinner, when all of the guests are invited by DJ to make speeches. After toasting her daughter and admitting her regret over how their relationship has deteriorated, Deborah insists that she sign a prenuptial agreement. DJ refuses, and her mother proceeds to loudly embarrass her in front of all the attending guests. Ava privately consoles DJ by suggesting that she make decisions for herself rather than for her mother's approval. In response, DJ decides to marry Aidan that night, and has Ava drive them to a drive-through chapel to perform the ceremony inside the car. Ava broadcasts the ceremony on her phone so Deborah can witness it. Marty and Deborah dance and share drinks at her house, which results in the two of them having sex.
8	8	"1.69 Million"	Paul W. Downs	Pat Regan	June 3, 2021
The morning after sleeping with her, Marty informs Deborah that her residency at the Palmetto is being terminated. An enraged Deborah enlists Ava's help in planning an impromptu show at a local comedy club so they can workshop new material. At the club – which has hosted Deborah since the beginning of her career – Ava is dismayed to learn that its late former owner, Ira, was known for sexually harassing female comics with impunity. When Ava asks Deborah why she never reported the harassment, Deborah is offended at the idea that she did not do enough for female comics in the industry. However, Deborah then notices the club's current owner, Drew, making inappropriate sexual comments towards her warm-up act. During her set, she condemns Drew onstage and offers him $1.69 million if he promises to leave the industry for good. Drew accepts, leading to cheers and applause from the crowd. Ava gets a call from Kayla, Jimmy's assistant at the talent agency, who tells her she has landed Ava a lucrative interview with a high-profile British production company in Los Angeles.
9	9	"Interview"	Lucia Aniello	Samantha Riley	June 10, 2021
In the middle of planning Deborah's final show at the Palmetto, Ava leaves to go to her interview with the producers in Los Angeles, lying to Deborah that she has a doctor's appointment. While there, she reconnects with her ex-girlfriend. Marcus finds out through Ava's sublet tenant the real reason why Ava is in Los Angeles; already envious of Ava's relationship with Deborah, he calls Jimmy and lies that Deborah knows about this and is angry with Ava. Jimmy calls Deborah to apologize, inadvertently revealing to her Ava's deception. Ava impresses the two producers interviewing her and is hired on the spot. However, she rejects the offer after learning that the producers want to create a show about a "crazy" woman and are only interested in Ava because they want her to share slanderous stories about Deborah as material. Upon returning to Las Vegas, Ava learns that Deborah cancelled her pre-show, leaving no time to rehearse her performance.
10	10	"I Think She Will"	Lucia Aniello	Ariel Karlin & Jen Statsky	June 10, 2021
While preparing for her final show, Deborah confronts Ava over taking the Los Angeles interview and says she is eschewing the new material in favor of her usual routine. The two argue; when Deborah slaps Ava for calling her a "hack", Ava quits her job. Ava later calls Kayla asking for the email address of the producers she met with in Los Angeles so she can sell them information on Deborah. Deborah promotes Marcus to CEO of her business. Before going onstage, she unwraps a gift Ava left for her: a framed magazine cover titled "Will Deborah Vance Make History?" with a handwritten note from Ava reading "I think she will." Moved by the gesture, Deborah decides to perform the new material onstage. Ava, meanwhile, flies to her parents' home in Boston for her father Dennis's funeral. Deborah suddenly appears and livens up the eulogy with humor, helping the guests reminisce about Dennis. Later, back at home, Ava apologizes to Deborah, who informs her that although her final Las Vegas show was a failure, she sees potential in the material and wants to go on tour with Ava to improve it. Ava happily accepts, but receives a call from Jimmy while boarding her flight asking why she sent a revealing email disparaging Deborah to the production company.

== Production ==
Lucia Aniello, Paul W. Downs, and Jen Statsky developed the idea for Hacks on a road trip in 2015. The three worked together previously on Broad City, and Aniello and Downs are romantic partners.

HBO Max ordered the pilot for Hacks, a single-camera comedy series, from co-creators Aniello, Downs, and Statsky in January 2020, and then picked it up for a 10-episode order in May 2020. The series is co-executive produced with Michael Schur (Fremulon), and David Miner and Morgan Sackett (3 Arts Entertainment). Hacks is produced by Universal Television.

On February 8, 2021, Jean Smart and Hannah Einbinder were announced as the two lead cast members and Carl Clemons-Hopkins was announced as a main cast member. Additional recurring cast members were also announced: Kaitlin Olson, Christopher McDonald, co-creator Paul W. Downs, Mark Indelicato, Poppy Liu, Johnny Sibilly, Meg Stalter, and Rose Abdoo.

The series premiered on May 13, 2021, with the release of episodes one and two.

== Reception ==
=== Critical response ===
The first season received critical acclaim. The review aggregator Rotten Tomatoes reported an 100% approval rating based on 74 critics’ reviews, with an average rating of 8.3/10. The website's critics consensus states, "A prickling debut that pulls few punches, Hacks deftly balances its sharp critiques of the comedy world with more intimate moments, all the while giving the incomparable Jean Smart a role worthy of her talents – and an excellent partner in Hannah Einbinder." Metacritic calculated a weighted average score of 82 out of 100 based on 24 critics.

=== Accolades ===
Award	Year	Category	Nominee(s)	Result	Ref.
American Cinema Editors Awards	2022	Best Edited Comedy Series	Susan Vaill (for "1.69 Million")	Won	
American Society of Cinematographers Awards	2022	Outstanding Achievement in Cinematography in an Episode of a Half-Hour Television Series	Adam Bricker (for "There Is No Line")	Nominated	
Art Directors Guild Awards	2022	Excellence in Production Design for a Half Hour Single-Camera Television Series	Jon Carlos (for "Primm")	Nominated	
Costume Designers Guild Awards	2022	Excellence in Contemporary Television	Kathleen Felix-Hager (for "There is No Line")	Nominated	
Critics' Choice Television Awards	2022	Best Comedy Series	Hacks	Nominated	
Critics' Choice Television Awards	2022	Best Actress in a Comedy Series	Jean Smart	Won	
Critics' Choice Television Awards	2022	Best Supporting Actress in a Comedy Series	Hannah Einbinder	Nominated	
Directors Guild of America Awards	2022	Outstanding Directorial Achievement in Comedy Series	Lucia Aniello (for "There Is No Line")	Won	
GLAAD Media Awards	2022	Outstanding New TV Series	Hacks	Won	
Golden Globe Awards	2022	Best Television Series – Musical or Comedy	Hacks	Won	
Golden Globe Awards	2022	Best Actress in a Television Series – Musical or Comedy	Hannah Einbinder	Nominated	
Golden Globe Awards	2022	Best Actress in a Television Series – Musical or Comedy	Jean Smart	Won	
Golden Reel Awards	2022	Outstanding Achievement in Sound Editing – 1/2 Hour – Comedy or Drama	Brett Hinton, Marc Glassman, Ryne Gierke, Samuel Munoz, Noel Vought, Jason Tregoe Newman (for "There Is No Line")	Nominated	
Gotham Awards	2021	Breakthrough Series – Short Format	Hacks	Nominated	
Gotham Awards	2021	Outstanding Performance in a New Series	Jean Smart	Nominated	
Hollywood Critics Association TV Awards	2021	Best Streaming Series, Comedy	Hacks	Nominated	
Hollywood Critics Association TV Awards	2021	Best Actress in a Streaming Series, Comedy	Jean Smart	Won	
Hollywood Critics Association TV Awards	2021	Best Supporting Actress in a Streaming Series, Comedy	Hannah Einbinder	Won	
Hollywood Critics Association TV Awards	2021	Best Supporting Actress in a Streaming Series, Comedy	Kaitlin Olson	Nominated	
Peabody Awards	2021	Entertainment	Hacks	Won	
Primetime Emmy Awards	2021	Outstanding Comedy Series	Jen Statsky, Paul W. Downs, Lucia Aniello, Michael Schur, David Miner, Morgan Sackett, Joanna Calo, Andrew Law and David Hyman	Nominated	
Primetime Emmy Awards	2021	Outstanding Lead Actress in a Comedy Series	Jean Smart (for "1.69 Million")	Won	
Primetime Emmy Awards	2021	Outstanding Supporting Actor in a Comedy Series	Carl Clemons-Hopkins (for "New Eyes")	Nominated	
Primetime Emmy Awards	2021	Outstanding Supporting Actress in a Comedy Series	Hannah Einbinder (for "I Think She Will")	Nominated	
Primetime Emmy Awards	2021	Outstanding Directing for a Comedy Series	Lucia Aniello (for "There Is No Line")	Won	
Primetime Emmy Awards	2021	Outstanding Writing for a Comedy Series	Lucia Aniello, Paul W. Downs and Jen Statsky (for "There Is No Line")	Won	
Primetime Creative Arts Emmy Awards	2021	Outstanding Guest Actress in a Comedy Series	Jane Adams (for "I Think She Will")	Nominated	
Primetime Creative Arts Emmy Awards	2021	Outstanding Casting for a Comedy Series	Jeanne McCarthy and Nicole Abellera Hallman	Nominated	
Primetime Creative Arts Emmy Awards	2021	Outstanding Cinematography for a Single-Camera Series (Half-Hour)	Adam Bricker (for "Primm")	Nominated	
Primetime Creative Arts Emmy Awards	2021	Outstanding Contemporary Costumes	Kathleen Felix-Hager and Karen Bellamy (for "There Is No Line")	Nominated	
Primetime Creative Arts Emmy Awards	2021	Outstanding Single-Camera Picture Editing for a Comedy Series	Susan Vaill (for "Primm")	Nominated	
Primetime Creative Arts Emmy Awards	2021	Outstanding Single-Camera Picture Editing for a Comedy Series	Jessica Brunetto (for "There Is No Line")	Nominated	
Primetime Creative Arts Emmy Awards	2021	Outstanding Single-Camera Picture Editing for a Comedy Series	Ali Greer (for "Tunnel of Love")	Nominated	
Primetime Creative Arts Emmy Awards	2021	Outstanding Production Design for a Narrative Program (Half-Hour)	Jon Carlos, James Bolenbaugh and Ellen Reede Dorros (for "Primm")	Nominated	
Primetime Creative Arts Emmy Awards	2021	Outstanding Sound Mixing for a Comedy or Drama Series (Half-Hour) and Animation	John W. Cook II, Ben Wilkins and Jim Lakin (for "Falling")	Nominated	
Producers Guild of America Awards	2022	Outstanding Producer of Episodic Television – Comedy	Jen Statsky, Paul W. Downs, Lucia Aniello, Michael Schur, David Miner, Morgan Sackett, Joanna Calo, Andrew Law, David Hyman, Joe Mande, and Jessica Chaffin	Nominated	
Screen Actors Guild Awards	2022	Outstanding Performance by an Ensemble in a Comedy Series	Rose Abdoo, Carl Clemons-Hopkins, Paul W. Downs, Hannah Einbinder, Mark Indelicato, Poppy Liu, Christopher McDonald, Jean Smart, and Megan Stalter	Nominated	
Screen Actors Guild Awards	2022	Outstanding Performance by a Female Actor in a Comedy Series	Jean Smart	Won	
Set Decorators Society of America Awards	2021	Best Achievement in Decor/Design of a Half-Hour Single-Camera Series	Ellen Reede Dorros and Jonathan Carlos	Won	
Television Critics Association Awards	2021	Program of the Year	Hacks	Nominated	
Television Critics Association Awards	2021	Outstanding Achievement in Comedy	Hacks	Nominated	
Television Critics Association Awards	2021	Outstanding New Program	Hacks	Nominated	
Television Critics Association Awards	2021	Individual Achievement in Comedy	Jean Smart	Won	
Writers Guild of America Awards	2022	Comedy Series	Lucia Aniello, Joanna Calo, Jessica Chaffin, Paul W. Downs, Cole Escola, Janis E. Hirsch, Ariel Karlin, Katherine Kearns, Andrew Law, Joe Mande, Pat Regan, Samantha Riley, Michael Schur, Jen Statsky	Won	
Writers Guild of America Awards	2022	New Series	Lucia Aniello, Joanna Calo, Jessica Chaffin, Paul W. Downs, Cole Escola, Janis E. Hirsch, Ariel Karlin, Katherine Kearns, Andrew Law, Joe Mande, Pat Regan, Samantha Riley, Michael Schur, Jen Statsky	Won	
