= 1.69 Million =

- Hacks episode
- Episode no.: Season 1 Episode 8
- Directed by: Paul W. Downs
- Written by: Pat Regan
- Original release date: June 3, 2021
- Running time: 31 minutes

Guest appearance
- Anna Maria Horsford as Francine

Episode chronology
← Previous "Tunnel of Love"	Next → "Interview"
- Hacks season 1

"1.69 Million" is the eighth episode of the first season of HBO Max comedy-drama series Hacks. It was directed by Paul W. Downs and written by Pat Regan. The plot follows Deborah Vance's stand-up appearance at a legendary Sacramento nightclub where she cut her teeth in her early career and Ava's dismay at the casual sexism that Deborah experienced but never challenged. The episode guest stars Anna Maria Horsford as another veteran comedian. It was released on June 3, 2021, and has an approximate runtime of 31 minutes.

Jean Smart won a Primetime Emmy Award for Outstanding Lead Actress in a Comedy Series for her performance.

== Plot ==
The morning after their one-night stand, Marty tells Deborah he is buying out her remaining contract and that her 2,500th show will be her last at the Palmetto. Motivated to attract a new contract at a different venue, Deborah and Ava begin working on new material for the final performance that will reflect previously untold events about her life.

Marcus expresses his trepidation about the new material to Ava. Back at his house, his mother accidentally interrupts a date that he is on with Wilson. He and Wilson go out to dinner and Wilson invites Marcus on a bouldering trip. Overcome by the prospect, Marcus briefly leaves the restaurant but ultimately returns to the date.

Ava's father calls to plan a trip to visit her in Las Vegas, although he is still recovering from his stroke. Later, Ava's mother calls to insist that her father is too unwell to travel. She asks Ava to come home for a week, but Ava says she cannot because of her job. Ava calls her father and says she is too busy for him to visit.

Deborah and Ava fly to a comedy club in Sacramento for Deborah to try out her new material. Deborah shares that she performed there frequently in her early career. Frenchie, a comedian she knew from back then, is at the club and they share memories of those days, including the sexual harassment and assault that women comedians faced at the hands of the club's owner, Ira. Ava expresses disappointment that Deborah did nothing to stop Ira after her rise to prominence, but Deborah angrily insists that her success itself was a worthwhile contribution to women in comedy.

Before her set, Deborah watches the host of the comedy night, Drew, harass one of the women comedians. Once onstage, she agrees to pay him $1.69 million to quit comedy for the rest of his life. Drew agrees to the terms that if he fails to comply, he will pay Deborah back double. After the show, Deborah's estranged sister, Kathy, approaches them in the parking lot. Deborah tries to run her over with her car. When Ava returns to Vegas, Kayla calls to inform her that she has set up a meeting for her with the co-creators of an in-development television series.

== Production ==
"1.69 Million" was written by Pat Regan and directed by series co-creator Paul W. Downs. The episode was released on June 3, 2021, simultaneously with episode 7, "Tunnel of Love." Co-creators Jen Statsky, Lucia Aniello, and Downs described their desire with the episode to illustrate the importance of "the work [women in comedy] did just by being brave enough to exist in a boys’ club."

== Reception ==
The episode received mainly positive reception. TVLine's Nick Caruso described the titular scene as "an Emmy-worthy moment we want to re-watch in perpetuity." Comedian Tranna Wintour described the depictions of sexism at the comedy club "the most painfully realistic depiction of the comedy world I have ever seen." In a less positive review, Olivia Cathcart of Paste described the titular scene as unsatisfying, as "this important discussion is brought up only to be dropped once Drew steps off stage" and further stated "it felt so hollow, just paying lip service to a pervasive problem," but also praised "the wonders of Jean Smart."

Smart won a Primetime Emmy Award for Outstanding Lead Actress in a Comedy Series for her performance in the episode.

== Awards and nominations ==
Year	Award	Category	Nominee(s)	Result	Ref
2021	Primetime Emmy Awards	Outstanding Lead Actress in a Comedy Series	Jean Smart	Won	
2022	American Cinema Editors Awards	Best Edited Comedy Series	Susan Vaill	Won	
