= There Is No Line =

- Hacks episode
- The first meeting of lead characters (left to right) Ava Daniels and Deborah Vance
- Episode no.: Season 1 Episode 1
- Directed by: Lucia Aniello
- Written by: Lucia Aniello; Paul W. Downs; Jen Statsky
- Cinematography by: Adam Bricker
- Editing by: Jessica Brunetto
- Original release date: May 13, 2021
- Running time: 29 minutes

Episode chronology
← Previous —	Next → "Primm"
- Hacks season 1

"There Is No Line" is the pilot episode of the American comedy-drama television series Hacks. It was directed by Lucia Aniello and co-written with Paul W. Downs, and Jen Statsky. The episode establishes the plot of the series, which centers on comediennes from different generations (played by Jean Smart and Hannah Einbinder) who are thrust into a working relationship after separate circumstances threaten their careers. The episode premiered on streaming network HBO Max on May 13, 2021 with an approximate running time of 29 minutes.

"There Is No Line" received Primetime Emmy Awards for Outstanding Writing for a Comedy Series and Outstanding Directing for a Comedy Series.

== Plot ==
Deborah Vance is an established comedian in the twilight of her career with a residency at The Palmetto casino in Las Vegas. She is financially successful and content with her regular Friday and Saturday night performances, as well as her frequent QVC sales appearances. She later panics when Marty, the Palmetto's owner, informs her that he is moving her to midweek so that her premium dates can be given to new acts like Pentatonix. Later she finds out via television news that her ex-husband has died, but she is unmoved by the news and continues with that evening's performance. The newscaster also says Deborah burned down her husband's house after he left her for her sister.

Ava Daniels is an arrogant 25-year-old television writer working in Los Angeles. She has been fired from her job after Tweeting a joke about a conservative congressman's gay son. Jimmy, her manager, sends her to work for Deborah, who is also his client.

The meeting initially goes poorly: Deborah has always written her own material and is uninterested in hiring a writer, and Ava views Deborah as past her prime. The pair trade insults and Ava leaves. However, Ava's parting insult causes Deborah to reconsider, and she chases Ava down to hear the joke that upended her career. The pair workshop the joke until they are both satisfied with it, and Deborah tells Ava she is hired.

== Production ==
"There Is No Line" was written by show creators Lucia Aniello, Paul W. Downs, and Jen Statsky, and directed by Aniello. The creators conceived of the idea for Hacks during a road trip to Portland in 2016. In an interview for Collider, Aniello said that the show aims to highlight the work of women trailblazers in comedy whose contributions have been minimized or who have experienced mistreatment by the media. It was shot in Los Angeles with some exterior shots on-location in Las Vegas.

The episode released on HBO Max on May 13, 2021.

== Critical reception ==
The episode received positive reception. Jean Smart and Hannah Einbinder were each hailed for their acting. Glen Weldon wrote for NPR of Smart's performance, "I don't know if the role of Deborah Vance was written for Smart, but she certainly makes it seem like it was. Moments that could be played for unkind laughs...are instead played for their humanity and vulnerability. As a result, the payoffs prove infinitely more satisfying." Einbinder also received praise from Kristen Baldwin of EW: "Einbinder, an L.A.-based stand-up comic tackling her first leading role, is immensely appealing as Ava. With her precision timing and bored California drawl, the actress brings such compelling confidence to her entitled, condescending character that it's all the more effective when Ava finally begins to face some hard truths about herself."

== Awards and nominations ==
Year	Award	Category	Nominee(s)	Result	Ref.
2021	Primetime Emmy Awards	Outstanding Directing for a Comedy Series	Lucia Aniello	Won	
2021	Primetime Emmy Awards	Outstanding Writing for a Comedy Series	Lucia Aniello, Paul W. Downs and Jen Statsky	Won	
2021	Primetime Creative Arts Emmy Awards	Outstanding Contemporary Costumes	Kathleen Felix-Hager and Karen Bellamy	Nominated	
2021	Primetime Creative Arts Emmy Awards	Outstanding Single-Camera Picture Editing for a Comedy Series	Jessica Brunetto	Nominated	
2022	American Society of Cinematographers Awards	Outstanding Achievement in Cinematography in an Episode of a Half-Hour Television Series	Adam Bricker	Nominated	
2022	Costume Designers Guild Awards	Excellence in Contemporary Television	Kathleen Felix-Hager	Nominated	
2022	Directors Guild of America Awards	Outstanding Directorial Achievement in Comedy Series	Lucia Aniello	Won	
2022	Golden Reel Awards	Outstanding Achievement in Sound Editing – 1/2 Hour – Comedy or Drama	Brett Hinton, Marc Glassman, Ryne Gierke, Samuel Munoz, Noel Vought, Jason Tregoe, and Newman	Won	
