= New Eyes (Hacks) =

- Hacks episode
- Episode no.: Season 1 Episode 6
- Directed by: Lucia Aniello
- Written by: Lucia Aniello; Paul W. Downs; Jen Statsky
- Cinematography by: Adam Bricker
- Editing by: Jessica Brunetto
- Original release date: May 27, 2021
- Running time: 32 minutes

Episode chronology
← Previous "Falling"	Next → "Tunnel of Love"
- Hacks season 1

"New Eyes" is the sixth episode of the first season of HBO Max comedy-drama series Hacks. It was directed by Lucia Aniello and co-written with Paul W. Downs and Jen Statsky. The story follows Ava (Hannah Einbinder) and Deborah (Jean Smart) working on new stand-up material at the luxury spa where Deborah recuperates after an eye lift. The episode has an approximate running time of 32 minutes and was released on May 27, 2021.

For the episode, Carl Clemons-Hopkins was nominated for a Primetime Emmy Award for Outstanding Supporting Actor in a Comedy Series.

== Plot ==
Deborah brings Ava with her to Seven Graces Surgical Center and Luxury Aftercare for her semi-regular eye lift so they can prepare material for her new stand-up show. While Deborah sleeps after the procedure, Ava anxiously tries to break into Deborah's phone to delete the voicemail she left last night while high on cocaine, in which she cursed Deborah out and quit her job. However, the phone requires Face ID to unlock, and Deborah's puffy, bandaged face isn't recognized by the iPhone. Taking Kiki's advice, Ava drives to the Vegas Madame Tussauds and finds Deborah's wax figure there. She uses it to unlock the phone and delete the voicemail.

While Marcus's mother and her friend throw a party at his house, he stays by himself at Deborah's home. He turns on the sprinklers and makes an anonymous tip about the usage to the city, prompting a visit by the usual water inspector, Wilson. The two have a sexual encounter.

Later, Deborah and Ava spend time together in Deborah's suite working on the new show, and take edibles together. They are enjoying each other's company and play a prank on the overly-chipper nurse, Perla, that ends badly. Ava confesses she's upset by the suicide of George, her recent one night-stand (from episode 5, "Falling"). Deborah comforts Ava and confesses that she never burned her husband's house down. She says that her husband made it up to hurt her reputation due to professional jealousy. Deborah goes on to share several outlandish events that took place after her show was cancelled. Ava insists she include these stories in her new show.

Ava suddenly experiences intense pelvic pain and is rushed to the hospital. After initially being invalidated by a male ER doctor, Deborah demands he take Ava's pain seriously. Ava has emergency surgery to address a ruptured ovarian cyst. Afterward, Deborah visits her in the hospital and agrees to put more honest material in her new show.

== Production ==
Jean Smart stood perfectly still in this scene to depict Deborah Vance's wax figurine at Madame Tussauds.

In the episode, Ava visits a wax museum to find a figure of Deborah; Jean Smart posed as the wax figurine and had to stand perfectly still in the scene. The production team used visual effects and makeup to give her face a waxy appearance.

The episode was written by series creators, Lucia Aniello, Paul W. Downs, and Jen Statsky, the second of two episodes they co-wrote in Hacks' first season.

"New Eyes" was released on HBO Max on May 27, 2021.

== Reception ==
=== Critical reception ===
The episode received critical acclaim. Marcus Jones described "New Eyes" in EW as "both brilliantly madcap and surprisingly emotional in how it brings the two stars closer together." The writer also attributed Jean Smart's Emmy win in part to her performance as a wax figurine in one of the episode's key scenes. Joshua Rivera of Polygon praised the depiction of sexism in healthcare settings: "But shows like Hacks can, with a single scene, let its writers push back without making it the central focus of the episode. A scene highlighting and resisting doctors’ longstanding dismissal of women is just there, part of the texture of the story." Kristin Reid noted the importance of the plot in Paste: "This episode is a defining moment in the season, allowing the two to finally find common ground and set the tone for the final four episodes where their bond is developed even further." Libby Hill of IndieWire referred to the emotional disclosure shared between the lead characters as "a deeply humane moment in a series that could have made every moment a punchline — a testament to the care and craft dedicated to building a connection audiences could relate to."

=== Awards ===
Carl Clemons-Hopkins was nominated for a Primetime Emmy Award for Outstanding Supporting Actor in a Comedy Series.

=== Accolades ===
- Paste, The 25 Best TV Episodes of 2021
- Entertainment Weekly, The 30 best TV episodes of 2021
- IndieWire, The Best Episodes of Television in 2021
