= Writers Guild of America Award for Television: Comedy Series =

Annual television award

- Awarded for: Outstanding Writing for a Comedy Series
- Country: United States
- Presented by: Writers Guild of America
- First award: 2005
- Currently held by: The Studio (2025)
- Website: http://www.wga.org/

The Writers Guild of America Award for Television: Comedy Series is an award presented by the Writers Guild of America to the writers of the best television comedy series of the season. It has been awarded since the 58th Annual Writers Guild of America Awards in 2006. The year indicates when each season aired.

== Winners and nominees ==
indicates the winner

=== 2000s ===
| Year | Program | Writer(s) | Network |
|---|---|---|---|
2005 (58th)
| 2005 (58th) | Curb Your Enthusiasm | Larry David | HBO |
| 2005 (58th) | Arrested Development | Barbie Feldman Adler, Brad E. Copeland, Richard Day, Karey Dornetto, Jake Farrow, Abraham Higginbotham, Mitchell Hurwitz, Sam Laybourne, John Levenstein, Courtney Lilly, Dean Lorey, Chuck Martin, Lisa Parsons, Richard Rosenstock, Tom Saunders, Maria Semple, Chuck Tatham, Jim Vallely, Ron Weiner | Fox |
| 2005 (58th) | My Name Is Earl | Barbie Adler, Bobby Bowman, Vali Chandrasekaran, J. B. Cook, Brad Copeland, Victor Fresco, Greg Garcia, John Hoberg, Kat Likkel, Mike Pennie, Tim Stack, Hilary Winston, Danielle Sanchez-Witzel | NBC |
| 2005 (58th) | The Office | Jennifer Celotta, Greg Daniels, Lee Eisenberg, Ricky Gervais, Mindy Kaling, Paul B. Lieberstein, Stephen Merchant, B. J. Novak, Michael Schur, Gene Stupnitsky, Larry Wilmore | NBC |
| 2005 (58th) | Entourage | Brian Burns, Larry Charles, Cliff Dorfman, Doug Ellin, Chris Henchy, Stephen Levinson, Rob Weiss | HBO |
2006 (59th)
| 2006 (59th) | The Office | Steve Carell, Jennifer Celotta, Greg Daniels, Lee Eisenberg, Brent Forrester, Ricky Gervais, Mindy Kaling, Paul Lieberstein, Stephen Merchant, B. J. Novak, Michael Schur, Justin Spitzer, Gene Stupnitsky | NBC |
| 2006 (59th) | 30 Rock | Brett Baer, Jack Burditt, Kay Cannon, Robert Carlock, Tina Fey, Dave Finkel, Daisy Gardner, Donald Glover, Matt Hubbard, John Riggi | NBC |
| 2006 (59th) | Arrested Development | Richard Day, Karey Dornetto, Jake Farrow, Mitchell Hurwitz, Sam Laybourne, Dean Lorey, Tom Saunders, Maria Semple, Chuck Tatham, Jim Vallely, Ron Weiner | Fox |
| 2006 (59th) | Curb Your Enthusiasm | Larry David | HBO |
| 2006 (59th) | Entourage | Marc Abrams, Lisa Alden, Michael Benson, Brian Burns, Doug Ellin, Rob Weiss | HBO |
2007 (60th)
| 2007 (60th) | 30 Rock | Brett Baer, Jack Burditt, Kay Cannon, Robert Carlock, Tina Fey, Dave Finkel, Daisy Gardner, Donald Glover, Matt Hubbard, Jon Pollack, John Riggi, Tami Sagher, Ron Weiner | NBC |
| 2007 (60th) | Curb Your Enthusiasm | Larry David | HBO |
| 2007 (60th) | Entourage | Marc Abrams, Lisa Alden, Michael Benson, Brian Burns, Doug Ellin, Alex Gansa, Tim Griffin, Dusty Kay, Stephen Levinson, Ally Musika, Wes Nickerson, Rob Weiss | HBO |
| 2007 (60th) | Flight of the Conchords | Damon Beesley, James Bobin, Jemaine Clement, Eric Kaplan, Bret McKenzie, Iain Morris, Duncan Sarkies, Paul Simms, Taika Waititi | HBO |
| 2007 (60th) | The Office | Steve Carell, Jennifer Celotta, Greg Daniels, Lee Eisenberg, Anthony Farrell, Brent Forrester, Mindy Kaling, Ryan Koh, Lester Lewis, Paul Lieberstein, B. J. Novak, Michael Schur, Justin Spitzer, Gene Stupnitsky, Caroline Williams, Larry Wilmore | NBC |
2008 (61st)
| 2008 (61st) | 30 Rock | Jack Burditt, Kay Cannon, Robert Carlock, Tina Fey, Donald Glover, Andrew Guest, Matt Hubbard, Jon Pollack, John Riggi, Tami Sagher, Ron Weiner | NBC |
| 2008 (61st) | Entourage | Daniel Cohn, Doug Ellin, Jeremy Miller Ally Musika, Ben Nedivi, Wes Nickerson Steve Pink, Rob Weiss, Matt Wolpert | HBO |
| 2008 (61st) | The Office | Steve Carell, Jennifer Celotta, Greg Daniels, Lee Eisenberg, Anthony Farrell, Brent Forrester, Daniel J. Goor, Charlie Grandy, Mindy Kaling, Ryan Koh, Lester Lewis, Paul Lieberstein, Warren Lieberstein, B. J. Novak, Michael Schur, Aaron Shure, Justin Spitzer, Gene Stupnitsky, Halsted Sullivan | NBC |
| 2008 (61st) | The Simpsons | J. Stewart Burns, Daniel Chun, Joel H. Cohen, Kevin Curran, John Frink, Tom Gammill, Valentina Garza, Stephanie Gillis, Dan Greaney, Reid Harrison, Ron Hauge, Al Jean, Brian Kelley, Billy Kimball, Rob LaZebnik, Tim Long, Ian Maxtone-Graham, David Mirkin, Bill Odenkirk, Carolyn Omine, Don Payne, Michael Price, Max Pross, Mike Reiss, Mike Scully, Matt Selman, Matt Warburton, Jeff Westbrook, Marc Wilmore, William Wright | Fox |
| 2008 (61st) | Weeds | Roberto Benabib, Mark A. Burley, Ron Fitzgerald, David Holstein, Rolin Jones, Brendan Kelly, Jenji Kohan, Victoria Morrow, Matthew Salsberg | Showtime |
2009 (62nd)
| 2009 (62nd) | 30 Rock | Jack Burditt, Kay Cannon, Robert Carlock, Tom Ceraulo, Vali Chandrasekaran, Tina Fey, Donald Glover, Steve Hely, Matt Hubbard, Dylan Morgan, Paula Pell, Jon Pollack, John Riggi, Tami Sagher, Josh Siegal, Ron Weiner, Tracey Wigfield | NBC |
| 2009 (62nd) | Curb Your Enthusiasm | Larry David | HBO |
| 2009 (62nd) | Glee | Ian Brennan, Brad Falchuk, Ryan Murphy | Fox |
| 2009 (62nd) | Modern Family | Paul Corrigan, Sameer Gardezi, Joe Lawson, Steven Levitan, Christopher Lloyd, Dan O'Shannon, Brad Walsh, Caroline Williams, Bill Wrubel, Danny Zuker | ABC |
| 2009 (62nd) | The Office | Jennifer Celotta, Danny Chun, Greg Daniels, Lee Eisenberg, Anthony Q. Farrell, Brent Forrester, Daniel J. Goor, Charlie Grandy, Mindy Kaling, Ryan Koh, Lester Lewis, Paul Lieberstein, Warren Lieberstein, B. J. Novak, Michael Schur, Aaron Shure, Justin Spitzer, Gene Stupnitsky, Halsted Sullivan | NBC |

=== 2010s ===
| Year | Program | Writer(s) | Network |
|---|---|---|---|
2010 (63rd)
| 2010 (63rd) | Modern Family | Jerry Collins, Paul Corrigan, Alex Herschlag, Abraham Higginbotham, Elaine Ko, Joe Lawson, Steve Levitan, Christopher Lloyd, Dan O'Shannon, Jeffrey Richman, Brad Walsh, Ilana Wernick, Bill Wrubel, Danny Zuker | ABC |
| 2010 (63rd) | 30 Rock | Jack Burditt, Hannibal Buress, Kay Cannon, Robert Carlock, Tom Ceraulo, Vali Chandrasekaran, Tina Fey, Jon Haller, Steve Hely, Matt Hubbard, Dylan Morgan, Paula Pell, John Riggi, Josh Siegal, Ron Weiner, Tracey Wigfield | NBC |
| 2010 (63rd) | Glee | Ian Brennan, Brad Falchuk, Ryan Murphy | Fox |
| 2010 (63rd) | Nurse Jackie | Liz Brixius, Rick Cleveland, Nancy Fichman, Liz Flahive, Jennifer Hoppe-House, Mark Hudis, Linda Wallem, Christine Zander | Showtime |
| 2010 (63rd) | The Office | Jennifer Celotta, Daniel Chun, Greg Daniels, Lee Eisenberg, Brent Forrester, Amelie Gillette, Charlie Grandy, Steve Hely, Jonathan A. Hughes, Mindy Kaling, Carrie Kemper, Jason Kessler, Paul Lieberstein, Warren Lieberstein, B. J. Novak, Peter Ocko, Robert Padnick, Aaron Shure, Justin Spitzer, Gene Stupnitsky, Halsted Sullivan, Jon Vitti | NBC |
2011 (64th)
| 2011 (64th) | Modern Family | Cindy Chupack, Paul Corrigan, Abraham Higginbotham, Ben Karlin, Elaine Ko, Carol Leifer, Steve Levitan, Christopher Lloyd, Dan O'Shannon, Jeffrey Richman, Brad Walsh, Ilana Wernick, Bill Wrubel, Danny Zuker | ABC |
| 2011 (64th) | 30 Rock | Jack Burditt, Hannibal Buress, Kay Cannon, Robert Carlock, Tom Ceraulo, Vali Chandrasekaran, Tina Fey, Jon Haller, Matt Hubbard, Dylan Morgan, John Riggi, Josh Siegal, Ron Weiner, Tracey Wigfield | NBC |
| 2011 (64th) | Curb Your Enthusiasm | Alec Berg, Larry David, David Mandel, Jeff Schaffer | HBO |
| 2011 (64th) | Louie | Pamela Adlon, Louis C.K. | FX |
| 2011 (64th) | Parks and Recreation | Greg Daniels, Katie Dippold, Dan Goor, Norm J. Hiscock, Emily Kapnek, Dave King, Greg Levine, Aisha Muharrar, Chelsea Peretti, Amy Poehler, Brian Rowe, Michael Schur, Mike Scully, Emily Spivey, Alan Yang, Harris Wittels | NBC |
2012 (65th)
| 2012 (65th) | Louie | Pamela Adlon, Vernon Chatman, Louis C.K. | FX |
| 2012 (65th) | 30 Rock | Jack Burditt, Kay Cannon, Robert Carlock, Tom Ceraulo, Vali Chandrasekaran, Luke Del Tredici, Tina Fey, Lauren Gurganous, Matt Hubbard, Colleen McGuinness, Sam Means, Dylan Morgan, Nina Pedrad, John Riggi, Josh Siegal, Ron Weiner, Tracey Wigfield | NBC |
| 2012 (65th) | Girls | Judd Apatow, Lesley Arfin, Lena Dunham, Sarah Heyward, Bruce Eric Kaplan, Jenni Konner, Deborah Schoeneman, Dan Sterling | HBO |
| 2012 (65th) | Modern Family | Cindy Chupack, Paul Corrigan, Abraham Higginbotham, Ben Karlin, Elaine Ko, Steven Levitan, Christopher Lloyd, Dan O'Shannon, Jeffrey Richman, Audra Sielaff, Brad Walsh, Bill Wrubel, Danny Zuker | ABC |
| 2012 (65th) | Parks and Recreation | Megan Amram, Greg Daniels, Nate Dimeo, Katie Dippold, Daniel J. Goor, Norm J. Hiscock, Dave King, Greg Levine, Joe Mande, Aisha Muharrar, Nick Offerman, Chelsea Peretti, Amy Poehler, Alexandra Rushfield, Michael Schur, Mike Scully, Harris Wittels, Alan Yang | NBC |
2013 (66th)
| 2013 (66th) | Veep | Simon Blackwell, Roger Drew, Sean Gray, Armando Iannucci, Ian Martin, Georgia Pritchett, David Quantick, Tony Roche, Will Smith | HBO |
| 2013 (66th) | 30 Rock | Jack Burditt, Robert Carlock, Tom Ceraulo, Luke Del Tredici, Tina Fey, Lang Fisher, Matt Hubbard, Colleen McGuinness, Sam Means, Dylan Morgan, Nina Pedrad, Josh Siegal, Tracey Wigfield | NBC |
| 2013 (66th) | Modern Family | Paul Corrigan, Bianca Douglas, Megan Ganz, Abraham Higginbotham, Ben Karlin, Elaine Ko, Steven Levitan, Christopher Lloyd, Becky Mann, Dan O'Shannon, Jeffrey Richman, Audra Sielaff, Emily Spivey, Brad Walsh, Bill Wrubel, Danny Zuker | ABC |
| 2013 (66th) | Orange Is the New Black | Liz Friedman, Sian Heder, Tara Herrmann, Sara Hess, Nick Jones, Jenji Kohan, Gary Lennon, Lauren Morelli, Marco Ramirez | Netflix |
| 2013 (66th) | Parks and Recreation | Megan Amram, Donick Cary, Greg Daniels, Nate DiMeo, Emma Fletcher, Rachna Fruchbom, Daniel J. Goor, Norm Hiscock, Matt Hubbard, Dave King, Greg Levine, Joe Mande, Sam Means, Aisha Muharrar, Matt Murray, Amy Poehler, Alexandra Rushfield, Michael Schur, Jen Statsky, Harris Wittels, Alan Yang | NBC |
2014 (67th)
| 2014 (67th) | Louie | Pamela Adlon, Louis C.K. | FX |
| 2014 (67th) | Orange Is the New Black | Stephen Falk, Sian Heder, Tara Herrmann, Sara Hess, Nick Jones, Jenji Kohan, Lauren Morelli, Alex Regnery, Hartley Voss | Netflix |
| 2014 (67th) | Silicon Valley | John Altschuler, Alec Berg, Matteo Borghese, Jessica Gao, Mike Judge, Dave Krinsky, Carson Mell, Dan O’Keefe, Clay Tarver, Rob Turbovsky, Ron Weiner | HBO |
| 2014 (67th) | Transparent | Bridget Bedard, Micah Fitzerman-Blue, Noah Harpster, Ethan Kuperberg, Ali Liebegott, Faith Soloway, Joey Soloway | Amazon |
| 2014 (67th) | Veep | Simon Blackwell, Kevin Cecil, Roger Drew, Sean Gray, Armando Iannucci, Ian Martin, Georgia Pritchett, David Quantick, Andy Riley, Tony Roche, Will Smith | HBO |
2015 (68th)
| 2015 (68th) | Veep | Simon Blackwell, Jon Brown, Kevin Cecil, Roger Drew, Peter Fellows, Neil Gibbons, Rob Gibbons, Sean Gray, Callie Hersheway, Armando Iannucci, Sean Love, Ian Martin, Georgia Pritchett, David Quantick, Andy Riley, Tony Roche, Will Smith | HBO |
| 2015 (68th) | Broad City | Lucia Aniello, Paul W. Downs, Naomi Ekperigin, Ilana Glazer, Abbi Jacobson, Chris Kelly, Anthony King, Jen Statsky | Comedy Central |
| 2015 (68th) | Silicon Valley | Amy Aniobi, Alec Berg, Carrie Kemper, Sonny Lee, Dan Lyons, Carson Mell, Dan O’Keefe, Clay Tarver, Ron Weiner | HBO |
| 2015 (68th) | Transparent | Arabella Anderson, Bridget Bedard, Micah Fitzerman-Blue, Noah Harpster, Ethan Kuperberg, Ali Liebegott, Our Lady J, Faith Soloway, Joey Soloway | Amazon |
| 2015 (68th) | Unbreakable Kimmy Schmidt | Emily Altman, Jack Burditt, Robert Carlock, Azie Mira Dungey, Tina Fey, Lauren Gurganous, Charla Lauriston, Sam Means, Dan Rubin, Meredith Scardino, Allison Silverman, Lon Zimmet | Netflix |
2016 (69th)
| 2016 (69th) | Atlanta | Donald Glover, Stephen Glover, Stefani Robinson, Paul Simms | FX |
| 2016 (69th) | Silicon Valley | Megan Amram, Alec Berg, Donick Cary, Adam Countee, Jonathan Dotan, Mike Judge, Carrie Kemper, John Levenstein, Dan Lyons, Carson Mell, Dan O’Keefe, Clay Tarver, Ron Weiner | HBO |
| 2016 (69th) | Transparent | Arabella Anderson, Bridget Bedard, Micah Fitzerman-Blue, Noah Harpster, Jessi Klein, Stephanie Kornick, Ethan Kuperberg, Ali Liebegott, Our Lady J, Faith Soloway, Joey Soloway | Amazon |
| 2016 (69th) | Unbreakable Kimmy Schmidt | Emily Altman, Robert Carlock, Azie Mira Dungey, Tina Fey, Lauren Gurganous, Sam Means, Dylan Morgan, Marlena Rodriguez, Dan Rubin, Meredith Scardino, Josh Siegal, Allison Silverman, Leila Strachan | Netflix |
| 2016 (69th) | Veep | Rachel Axler, Sean Gray, Alex Gregory, Peter Huyck, Eric Kenward, Billy Kimball, Steve Koren, David Mandel, Jim Margolis, Lew Morton, Georgia Pritchett, Will Smith, Alexis Wilkinson | HBO |
2017 (70th)
| 2017 (70th) | Veep | Rachel Axler, Sean Gray, Alex Gregory, Peter Huyck, Eric Kenward, Billy Kimball, Steve Koren, David Mandel, Jim Margolis, Lew Morton, Georgia Pritchett, Will Smith, Alexis Wilkinson | HBO |
| 2017 (70th) | Curb Your Enthusiasm | Larry David, Jon Hayman, Justin Hurwitz, Jeff Schaffer | HBO |
| 2017 (70th) | GLOW | Arabella Anderson, Kristoffer Diaz, Liz Flahive, Tara Herrmann, Nick Jones, Jenji Kohan, Carly Mensch, Emma Rathbone, Sascha Rothchild, Rachel Shukert | Netflix |
| 2017 (70th) | Master of None | Aziz Ansari, Andrew Blitz, Zoe Jarman, Cord Jefferson, Sarah Peters, Sarah Schneider, Michael Schur, Leila Strachan, Gene Stupnitsky, Lakshmi Sundaram, Lena Waithe, Jason Woliner, Alan Yang | Netflix |
| 2017 (70th) | Silicon Valley | Alec Berg, Donick Cary, Adam Countee, Jonathan Dotan, Mike Judge, Carrie Kemper, John Levenstein, Dan Lyons, Carson Mell, Dan O'Keefe, Clay Tarver, Aaron Zelman | HBO |
2018 (71st)
| 2018 (71st) | The Marvelous Mrs. Maisel | Kate Fodor, Noah Gardenswartz, Jen Kirkman, Sheila Lawrence, Daniel Palladino, Amy Sherman-Palladino | Amazon |
| 2018 (71st) | Atlanta | Ibra Ake, Donald Glover, Stephen Glover, Taofik Kolade, Jamal Olori, Stefani Robinson, Paul Simms | FX |
| 2018 (71st) | Barry | Alec Berg, Duffy Boudreau, Bill Hader, Emily Heller, Liz Sarnoff, Ben Smith, Sarah Solemani | HBO |
| 2018 (71st) | GLOW | Liz Flahive, Tara Herrmann, Nick Jones, Jenji Kohan, Carly Mensch, Marquita Robinson, Kim Rosenstock, Sascha Rothchild, Rachel Shukert | Netflix |
| 2018 (71st) | The Good Place | Megan Amram, Christopher Encell, Kate Gersten, Cord Jefferson, Andrew Law, Joe Mande, Kassia Miller, Dylan Morgan, Matt Murray, Rae Sanni, Daniel Schofield, Michael Schur, Josh Siegal, Jen Statsky, Tyler Straessle | NBC |
2019 (72nd)
| 2019 (72nd) | Barry | Alec Berg, Duffy Boudreau, Bill Hader, Emily Heller, Jason Kim, Taofik Kolade, and Elizabeth Sarnoff | HBO |
| 2019 (72nd) | The Marvelous Mrs. Maisel | Kate Fodor, Noah Gardenswartz, Daniel Goldfarb, Alison Leiby, Daniel Palladino, Sono Patel, Amy Sherman-Palladino and Jordan Temple | Prime Video |
| 2019 (72nd) | PEN15 | Jeff Chan, Maya Erskine, Anna Konkle, Gabe Liedman, Stacy Osei-Kuffour, Andrew Rhymer, Jessica Watson, and Sam Zvibleman | Hulu |
| 2019 (72nd) | Russian Doll | Jocelyn Bioh, Flora Birnbaum, Cirocco Dunlap, Leslye Headland, Natasha Lyonne, Amy Poehler, Tami Sagher, and Allison Silverman | Netflix |
| 2019 (72nd) | Veep | Gabrielle Allan-Greenberg, Rachel Axler, Emilia Barrosse, Ted Cohen, Jennifer Crittenden, Alex Gregory, Steve Hely, Peter Huyck, Dan O'Keefe, Erik Kenward, Billy Kimball, David Mandel, Ian Maxtone-Graham, Dan Mintz, Lew Morton, Georgia Pritchett, and Leila Strachan | HBO |

=== 2020s ===
| Year | Program | Writer(s) | Network |
|---|---|---|---|
2020 (73rd)
| 2020 (73rd) | Ted Lasso | Jane Becker, Leann Bowen, Brett Goldstein, Brendan Hunt, Joe Kelly, Bill Lawrence, Jamie Lee, Jason Sudeikis, Phoebe Walsh, Bill Wrubel | Apple TV+ |
| 2020 (73rd) | Curb Your Enthusiasm | Larry David, Justin Hurwitz, Steve Leff, Carol Leifer, Jeff Schaffer | HBO |
| 2020 (73rd) | The Great | Vanessa Alexander, Tony McNamara, Tess Morris, Amelia Roper, Gretel Vella, James Wood | Hulu |
| 2020 (73rd) | PEN15 | Alyssa DiMari, Maya Erskine, Anna Konkle, Josh Levine, Gabe Liedman, Rachele Lynn, Vera Santamaria, Diana Tay, Sam Zvibleman | Hulu |
| 2020 (73rd) | What We Do in the Shadows | Jake Bender, Jemaine Clement, Zach Dunn, Joseph Furey, Shana Gohd, Sam Johnson, Chris Marcil, William Meny, Sarah Naftalis, Stefani Robinson, Marika Sawyer, Paul Simms | FX |
2021 (74th)
| 2021 (74th) | Hacks | Lucia Aniello, Joanna Calo, Jessica Chaffin, Paul W. Downs, Cole Escola, Janis Hirsch, Ariel Karlin, Katherine Kearns, Andrew Law, Joe Mande, Pat Regan, Samantha Riley, Michael Schur, Jen Statsky | HBO Max |
| 2021 (74th) | Curb Your Enthusiasm | Larry David, Steve Leff, Carol Leifer, Jeff Schaffer, Nathaniel Stein | HBO |
| 2021 (74th) | Only Murders in the Building | Thembi Banks, Matteo Borghese, Rachel Burger, Kirker Butler, Madeleine George, John Robert Hoffman, Stephen Markley, Steve Martin, Kristin Newman, Ben Philippe, Kim Rosenstock, Ben Smith, Rob Turbovsky | Hulu |
| 2021 (74th) | Ted Lasso | Jane Becker, Ashley Nicole Black, Leann Bowen, Sasha Garron, Brett Goldstein, Brendan Hunt, Joe Kelly, Bill Lawrence, Jamie Lee, Jason Sudeikis, Phoebe Walsh, Bill Wrubel | Apple TV+ |
| 2021 (74th) | What We Do in the Shadows | Jake Bender, Jemaine Clement, Zach Dunn, Joseph Furey, Shana Gohd, Sam Johnson, Chris Marcil, William Meny, Sarah Naftalis, Stefani Robinson, Marika Sawyer, Paul Simms | FX |
2022 (75th)
| 2022 (75th) | The Bear | Karen Joseph Adcock, Joanna Calo, Rene Gube, Sofya Levitsky-Weitz, Alex O’Keefe, Catherine Schetina, Christopher Storer | FX |
| 2022 (75th) | Abbott Elementary | Quinta Brunson, Ava Coleman, Riley Dufurrena, Justin Halpern, Joya McCrory, Morgan Murphy, Brittani Nichols, Kate Peterman, Brian Rubenstein, Patrick Schumacker, Justin Tan, Jordan Temple, Garrett Werner | ABC |
| 2022 (75th) | Barry | Emma Barrie, Alec Berg, Duffy Boudreau, Bill Hader, Emily Heller, Nicky Hirschhorn, Jason Kim, Liz Sarnoff | HBO |
| 2022 (75th) | Hacks | Lucia Aniello, Jessica Chaffin, Paul W. Downs, Ariel Karlin, Andrew Law, Joe Mande, Aisha Muharrar, Pat Regan, Samantha Riley, Jen Statsky | HBO Max |
| 2022 (75th) | Only Murders in the Building | Matteo Borghese, Rachel Burger, Kirker Butler, Valentina L. Garza, Madeleine George, Joshua Allen Griffith, John Robert Hoffman, Noah Levine, Stephen Markley, Kristin Newman, Ben Philippe, Ben Smith, Rob Turbovsky | Hulu |
2023 (76th)
| 2023 (76th) | The Bear | Karen Joseph Adcock, Joanna Calo, Kelly Galuska, Rene Gube, Sofya Levitsky-Weitz, Stacy Osei-Kuffour, Alex Russell, Catherine Schetina, Christopher Storer | FX |
| 2023 (76th) | Abbott Elementary | Quinta Brunson, Ava Coleman, Riley Dufurrena, Justin Halpern, Joya McCrory, Morgan Murphy, Brittani Nichols, Kate Peterman, Brian Rubenstein, Patrick Schumacker, Justin Tan, Jordan Temple, Garrett Werner | ABC |
| 2023 (76th) | Barry | Emma Barrie, Alec Berg, Duffy Boudreau, Bill Hader, Emily Heller, Nicky Hirschhorn, Taofik Kolade, Liz Sarnoff | HBO |
| 2023 (76th) | Jury Duty | Tanner Bean, Lee Eisenberg, Marcos Gonzalez, Cody Heller, Mekki Leeper, Katrina Mathewson, Kerry O'Neill, Ese Shaw, Gene Stupnitsky, Andrew Weinberg, Evan Williams | Amazon Freevee |
| 2023 (76th) | Only Murders in the Building | Matteo Borghese, Madeleine George, Sas E. Goldberg, Joshua Allen Griffith, John Robert Hoffman, Elaine Ko, Noah Levine, Tess Morris, J.J. Philbin, Ben Philippe, Jake Schnesel, Ben Smith, Siena Streiber, Pete Swanson, Rob Turbovsky | Hulu |
2024 (77th)
| 2024 (77th) | Hacks | Lucia Aniello, Guy Branum, Jessica Chaffin, Paul W. Downs, Jess Dweck, Ariel Karlin, Andrew Law, Carol Leifer, Carolyn Lipka, Joe Mande, Aisha Muharrar, Pat Regan, Samantha Riley, Jen Statsky | Max |
| 2024 (77th) | Abbott Elementary | Quinta Brunson, Ava Coleman, Riley Dufurrena, Justin Halpern, Joya McCrory, Chad Morton, Morgan Murphy, Brittani Nichols, Rebekka Pesqueira, Kate Peterman, Brian Rubenstein, Patrick Schumacker, Justin Tan, Jordan Temple, Garrett Werner | ABC |
| 2024 (77th) | The Bear | Karen Joseph Adcock, Joanna Calo, Rene Gube, Will Guidara, Matty Matheson, Alex Russell, Catherine Schetina, Christopher Storer, Courtney Storer | FX |
| 2024 (77th) | Curb Your Enthusiasm | Larry David, Jon Hayman, Justin Hurwitz, Carol Leifer, Stephen Leff, Jeff Schaffer, Nathaniel Stein | HBO |
| 2024 (77th) | What We Do in the Shadows | Jake Bender, Max Brockman, Zach Dunn, Shana Gohd, Amelia Haller, Sam Johnson, Jeremy Levick, Chris Marceil, William Meny, Sarah Naftalis, Marika Sawyer, Paul Simms, Rajat Suresh, Lauren Wells | FX |
2025 (78th)
| 2025 (78th) | The Studio | Evan Goldberg, Alex Gregory, Peter Huyck, Frida Perez, Seth Rogen | Apple TV |
| 2025 (78th) | Abbott Elementary | Quinta Brunson, Ava Coleman, Lizzy Darrell, Riley Dufurrena, Justin Halpern, Joya McCrory, Chad Morton, Morgan Murphy, Brittani Nichols, Rebekka Pesqueira, Kate Peterman, Brian Rubenstein, Patrick Schumacker, Justin Tan, Jordan Temple, Garrett Werner | ABC |
| 2025 (78th) | The Chair Company | Zach Kanin, Gary Richardson, Tim Robinson, Marika Sawyer, Sarah Schneider, John Solomon | HBO |
| 2025 (78th) | Hacks | Genevieve Aniello, Lucia Aniello, Paul W. Downs, Jess Dweck, Ariel Karlin, Andrew Law, Carolyn Lipka, Joe Mande, Aisha Muharrar, Bridget Parker, Pat Regan, Samantha Riley, Jen Statsky | HBO Max |
| 2025 (78th) | The Rehearsal | Nathan Fielder, Carrie Kemper, Adam Locke-Norton, Eric Notarnicola | HBO |

== Total awards by network ==
- FX – 5
- HBO – 5
- NBC – 4
- ABC – 2
- Apple TV - 2
- HBO Max/Max - 2
- Prime Video – 1

== Total nominations by network ==
- HBO – 31
- NBC - 19
- FX - 11
- ABC - 9
- Netflix - 8
- Hulu – 6
- Fox - 5
- Prime Video - 5
- HBO Max/Max - 4
- Apple TV/+ - 2
- Showtime - 2
- Amazon Freevee - 1
- Comedy Central - 1

== Programs with multiple awards ==
3 awards

- 30 Rock (NBC) (consecutive)
- Veep (HBO)

2 awards

- The Bear (FX) (consecutive)
- Louie (FX)
- Hacks (HBO Max/Max)
- Modern Family (ABC) (consecutive)

== Programs with multiple nominations ==
9 nominations

- Curb Your Enthusiasm (HBO)

8 nominations

- 30 Rock (NBC)

6 nominations

- The Office (NBC)
- Veep (HBO)

5 nominations

- Modern Family (ABC)

4 nominations

- Abbott Elementary (ABC)
- Barry (HBO)
- Entourage (HBO)
- Hacks (HBO Max)
- Silicon Valley (HBO)

3 nominations

- The Bear (FX)
- Louie (FX)
- Only Murders in the Building (Hulu)
- Parks and Recreation (NBC)
- Transparent (Amazon)
- What We Do in the Shadows (FX)

2 nominations

- Arrested Development (Fox)
- Atlanta (FX)
- Glee (Fox)
- GLOW (Netflix)
- The Marvelous Mrs. Maisel (Amazon)
- Orange Is the New Black (Netflix)
- PEN15 (Hulu)
- Ted Lasso (Apple TV+)
- Unbreakable Kimmy Schmidt (Netflix)
