= 34th Producers Guild of America Awards =

34th Annual Producers Guild Awards
- Date: February 25, 2023
- Location: The Beverly Hilton, Beverly Hills, California
- Country: United States
- Presented by: Producers Guild of America

Highlights
- Best Producer(s) Motion Picture: Everything Everywhere All at Once – Jonathan Wang, Dan Kwan, and Daniel Scheinert
- Best Producer(s) Animated Feature: Guillermo del Toro's Pinocchio – Guillermo del Toro, Gary Ungar, and Alex Bulkley
- Best Producer(s) Documentary Motion Picture: Navalny – Odessa Rae, Diane Becker, Melanie Miller, and Shane Boris

The 34th Producers Guild of America Awards (also known as 2023 Producers Guild Awards or 2023 PGA Awards), honoring the best film and television producers of 2022, were held at the Beverly Hilton in Beverly Hills, California on February 25, 2023. The nominations in the documentary category were announced on December 12, 2022, the nominees in the sports, children's and short-form categories were announced on December 16, 2022, and the remaining nominations for film and television were announced on January 12, 2023. The nominations for the PGA Innovation Award were announced on February 10, 2023.

== Winners and nominees ==
=== Film ===
Darryl F. Zanuck Award for Outstanding Producer of Theatrical Motion Pictures
- Everything Everywhere All at Once – Jonathan Wang, Dan Kwan, and Daniel Scheinert
  - Avatar: The Way of Water – Jon Landau and James Cameron
  - The Banshees of Inisherin – Graham Broadbent, Pete Czernin, and Martin McDonagh
  - Black Panther: Wakanda Forever – Kevin Feige and Nate Moore
  - Elvis – Baz Luhrmann, Catherine Martin, Gail Berman, Schuyler Weiss, and Patrick McCormick
  - The Fabelmans – Steven Spielberg, Kristie Macosko Krieger, and Tony Kushner
  - Glass Onion: A Knives Out Mystery – Ram Bergman and Rian Johnson
  - Tár – Todd Field, Alexandra Milchan, and Scott Lambert
  - Top Gun: Maverick – Jerry Bruckheimer, Tom Cruise, Christopher McQuarrie, and David Ellison
  - The Whale – Jeremy Dawson, Ari Handel, and Darren Aronofsky
Outstanding Producer of Animated Theatrical Motion Pictures
- Guillermo del Toro's Pinocchio – Guillermo del Toro, Gary Ungar, and Alex Bulkley
  - Marcel the Shell with Shoes On – Elisabeth Holm, Andrew Goldman, Paul Mezey, and Caroline Kaplan
  - Minions: The Rise of Gru – Chris Meledandri, Janet Healy, and Chris Renaud
  - Puss in Boots: The Last Wish – Mark Swift
  - Turning Red – Lindsey Collins
Outstanding Producer of Documentary Theatrical Motion Pictures
- Navalny – Odessa Rae, Diane Becker, Melanie Miller, and Shane Boris
  - All That Breathes – Aman Mann, Shaunak Sen, and Teddy Leifer
  - Descendant – Margaret Brown, Kyle Martin, and Essie Chambers
  - Fire of Love – Sara Dosa, Shane Boris, and Ina Fichman
  - Nothing Compares – Eleanor Emptage and Michael Mallie
  - Retrograde – Matthew Heineman and Caitlin McNally
  - The Territory – Sigrid Dyekjaer, Will Miller, Lizzie Gillett, Darren Aronofsky, Gabriel Uchida, and Alex Pritz

=== Television ===
Norman Felton Award for Outstanding Producer of Episodic Television, Drama
- The White Lotus (HBO) – Mike White, David Bernad, Mark Kamine, Heather Persons, and John M. Valerio
  - Andor (Disney+) – Sanne Wohlenberg, Tony Gilroy, Kathleen Kennedy, Diego Luna, Toby Haynes, Michelle Rejwan, Kate Hazell, and David Meanti
  - Better Call Saul (AMC) – Vince Gilligan, Peter Gould, Mark Johnson, Melissa Bernstein, Thomas Schnauz, Gordon Smith, Alison Tatlock, Diane Mercer, Michael Morris, Ann Cherkis, Trina Siopy, Bob Odenkirk, Jenn Carroll, and James Powers
  - Ozark (Netflix) – Jason Bateman, Chris Mundy, Patrick Markey, John Shiban, Miki Johnson, Laura Linney, Erin Mitchell, Martin Zimmerman, Dana Scott, Paul Kolsby, and Laura Deeley
  - Severance (Apple TV+) – Ben Stiller, Nicholas Weinstock, Jackie Cohn, Mark Friedman, Dan Erickson, Andrew Colville, Chris Black, John Cameron, Jill Footlick, Kari Drake, Adam Scott, Patricia Arquette, Aoife McArdle, Amanda Overton, and Gerry Robert Byrne
Danny Thomas Award for Outstanding Producer of Episodic Television, Comedy
- The Bear (FX) – Joanna Calo, Josh Senior, Christopher Storer, Hiro Murai, Rene Gube, and Tyson Bidner
  - Abbott Elementary (ABC) – Quinta Brunson, Justin Halpern, Patrick Schumacker, Randall Einhorn, Scott Sites, and Josh Greene
  - Barry (HBO) – Alec Berg, Bill Hader, Aida Rodgers, Liz Sarnoff, Julie Camino, Emily Heller, Jason Kim, and Duffy Boudreau
  - Hacks (HBO Max) – Jen Statsky, Lucia Aniello, Paul W. Downs, Michael Schur, David Miner, Morgan Sackett, Joe Mande, Andrew Law, Aisha Muharrar, Ashley Glazier, Samantha Riley, Seth Edelstein, and Jessica Chaffin
  - Only Murders in the Building (Hulu) – Dan Fogelman, Jess Rosenthal, Steve Martin, Martin Short, Selena Gomez, John Hoffman, Matteo Borghese, Rob Turbovsky, Ben Smith, Kristin Newman, Kirker Butler, Nick Pavonetti, Kristin Bernstein, and Valentina Garza
David L. Wolper Award for Outstanding Producer of Limited or Anthology Series Television
- The Dropout (Hulu) – Elizabeth Meriwether, Katherine Pope, Michael Showalter, Jordana Mollick, Rebecca Jarvis, Taylor Dunn, Victoria Thompson, Liz Heldens, Liz Hannah, Hilton Smith, Dan LeFranc, Amanda Seyfried, Hilary Bettis, and Megan Mascena
  - Dahmer – Monster: The Jeffrey Dahmer Story (Netflix) – Ryan Murphy, Ian Brennan, Alexis Martin Woodall, Eric Kovtun, Evan Peters, Janet Mock, Scott Robertson, Sara Stelwagen, Tanase Popa, David McMillan, Todd Nenninger, Lou Eyrich, Todd Kubrak, Reilly Smith, Regis Kimble, Richard Jenkins, and Mathew Hart
  - Inventing Anna (Netflix) – Shonda Rhimes, Betsy Beers, Tom Verica, Matt Byrne, Kathy Ciric, Scott Collins, Alison Eakle, Sara Fischer, Abby Ajayi, Jess Brownell, Holden Chang, and Jessica Pressler
  - Obi-Wan Kenobi (Disney+) – Kathleen Kennedy, Michelle Rejwan, Deborah Chow, Ewan McGregor, and Joby Harold
  - Pam & Tommy (Hulu) – Robert Siegel, D.V. DeVincentis, Craig Gillespie, Dylan Sellers, Dave Franco, Megan Ellison, Sue Naegle, Ali Krug, Seth Rogen, Evan Goldberg, James Weaver, Alex McAtee, Chip Vucelich, and Sarah Gubbins
Outstanding Producer of Streamed or Televised Motion Pictures
- Weird: The Al Yankovic Story (The Roku Channel) – Whitney Hodack, Mike Farah, Joe Farrell, Lia Buman, Max Silva, and Al Yankovic
  - Fire Island (Hulu) – John Hodges and Brooke Posch
  - Hocus Pocus 2 (Disney+) – Lynn Harris
  - Pinocchio (Disney+) – Andrew Miano, Chris Weitz, Robert Zemeckis, and Derek Hogue
  - Prey (Hulu) – John Davis and Jhane Myers
Outstanding Producer of Non-Fiction Television
- Stanley Tucci: Searching for Italy (CNN) – Tom Barry, Adam Hawkins, Eve Kay, Stanley Tucci, Francesco Ficarra, Shauna Minoprio, Robin O'Sullivan, and Fiona Cleary
  - 30 for 30 (ESPN) – Marsha Cooke, John Dahl, Rob King, Erin Leyden, Brian Lockhart, Burke Magnus, Marquis Daisy, Gentry Kirby, Kristen Lappas, Adam Neuhaus, and Libby Geist
  - 60 Minutes (CBS) – Bill Owens
  - George Carlin's American Dream (HBO) – Wayne Federman, Teddy Leifer, Judd Apatow, Michael Bonfiglio, Jerry Hamza, Kelly Carlin, Amanda Glaze, and Joe Beshenkovsky
  - Lucy and Desi (Amazon) – Nigel Sinclair, Jeanne Elfant Festa, and Mark Monroe
Outstanding Producer of Game & Competition Television
- Lizzo's Watch Out for the Big Grrrls (Amazon) – Lizzo, Makiah Green, Kevin Beisler, Julie Pizzi, Farnaz Farjam, Myiea Coy, Kimberly Goodman, Glenda N. Cox, and Alana Balden
  - The Amazing Race (CBS) – Jerry Bruckheimer, Bertram van Munster, Jonathan Littman, Elise Doganieri, Mark Vertullo, and Phil Keoghan
  - RuPaul's Drag Race (VH1) – RuPaul Charles, Fenton Bailey, Randy Barbato, Tom Campbell, Mandy Salangsang, Steven Corfe, Ari Kolber, Thairin Smothers, John Polly, Michelle Visage, Michael Seligman, Natalia James, Sara Kordy, Jeremy McGovern, Alicia Gargaro-Magana, Carson Kressley, and Ross Mathews
  - Top Chef (Bravo) – Casey Kriley, Jo Sharon, Doneen Arquines, Gaylen Gawlowski, Hunter Braun, Nora Cromwell, Thi Nguyen, Hillary Olsen, Patrick Schmedeman, Eric Vier, Tom Colicchio, Padma Lakshmi, Frank Crane, Diana E. Gonzales, Diana Schmedeman, Sandee Birdsong, Steve Lichtenstein, and Samantha Hanks
  - The Voice (NBC) – John De Mol, Mark Burnett, Audrey Morrissey, Amanda Zucker, Kyra Thompson, Teddy Valenti, Brittany Martin Porter, Bart Kimball, Dan Paschen, Hayley Opalek McSherry, Jared Wyso, Meredith Ambrose, Amanda Borden, Clyde Lieberman, Kyle Grossinger, Stephanie Waters, Lamont Leak, and Melissa Wong
Outstanding Producer of Live Entertainment, Variety, Sketch, Standup & Talk Television
- Last Week Tonight with John Oliver (HBO) – John Oliver, Tim Carvell, Liz Stanton, Jon Thoday, James Taylor, Jeremy Tchaban, Catherine Owens, Whit Conway, Kaye Foley, Laura L. Griffin, Christopher McDaniel, Kate Mullaney, Matt Passet, Megan Peck Shub, Wynn Van Dusen, Marian Wang, and Charles Wilson
  - The Daily Show with Trevor Noah (Comedy Central) – Trevor Noah, Jen Flanz, Jill Katz, Justin Melkmann, Ian Berger, Max Browning, Pamela DePace, Ramin Hedayati, David Kibuuka, David Paul Meyer, Zhubin Parang, Elise Terrell, Jocelyn Conn, Jeff Gussow, Brittany Radocha, Shawna Shepherd, Beth Shorr, Dan Amira, David Blog, Adam Chodikoff, Jimmy Donn, Scott Hercman, Kira Klang Hopf, Allison MacDonald, Ryan Middleton, Aaron Perlman-Price, Matt Negrin, and Juliet Werner
  - Jimmy Kimmel Live! (ABC) – Jimmy Kimmel, Erin Irwin, David Craig, Molly McNearney, Jennifer Sharron, Doug DeLuca, Gary Greenberg, Tony Romero, Josh Weintraub, Seth Weidner, Danny Ricker, Ken Crosby, Josh Halloway, Patrick Friend, Nancy Fowkes, Craig Powell, and Rory Albanese
  - The Late Show with Stephen Colbert (CBS) – Stephen T. Colbert, Tom Purcell, Jon Stewart, Tanya Michnevich Bracco, Barry Julien, Matt Lappin, Opus Moreschi, Denise Rehrig, Aaron Cohen, Paul Dinello, Emily Gertler, Jay Katsir, Bjoern Stejskal, Sara Vilkomerson, Ballard C. Boyd, Michael Brumm, Ariel Dumas, Megan Gearheart, Gabe Gronli, Paige Kendig, Jake Plunkett, and Adam Wager
  - Saturday Night Live (NBC) – Lorne Michaels, Steve Higgins, Erik Kenward, Erin Doyle, Tom Broecker, Caroline Maroney, and Javier Winnik
Outstanding Sports Program
- Tony Hawk: Until the Wheels Fall Off (Hulu)
  - Formula 1: Drive to Survive (Netflix)
  - Hard Knocks: Training Camp with the Detroit Lions (HBO)
  - Legacy: The True Story of the LA Lakers (Hulu)
  - McEnroe (Showtime)
Outstanding Children's Program
- Sesame Street (HBO Max)
  - Fraggle Rock: Back to the Rock (Apple TV+)
  - Green Eggs and Ham (Netflix)
  - Snoopy Presents: It's The Small Things, Charlie Brown (Apple TV+)
  - Waffles + Mochi's Restaurant (Netflix)
Outstanding Short-Form Program
- Only Murders in the Building: One Killer Question (Hulu)
  - Better Call Saul: Filmmaker Training (AMC)
  - Love, Death & Robots (Netflix)
  - Sesame Street's #ComingTogether Word of the Day Series (Cartoon Network)
  - Tales of the Jedi (Disney+)

=== PGA Innovation Award ===
PGA Innovation Award
- Stay Alive, My Son (UME Studios)
  - Dance Monsters (Lime Pictures)
  - Experience Yosemite (CityLights)
  - Ghostbusters VR Academy (HOLOGATE)
  - LeMusk – A Cinematic Sensory Experience (Intel)
  - Lustration (New Canvas)
  - On the Morning You Wake (To the End of the World) (ASTREA)
  - OXYMORE by Jean-Michel Jarre (VRROOM)
  - PerfectoVerse (Watch and Play)
  - Space Explorers: Artemis Ascending (Felix and Paul Studios, with participation of MeetMo, Meta Quest)
  - Stranger Things Immersive Watch Party (Sawhorse Productions)
  - Verizon Pepsi Halftime Ultra Pass (R/GA)

=== David O. Selznick Achievement Award in Theatrical Motion Pictures ===
- Tom Cruise

=== Milestone Award ===
- Michael De Luca and Pamela Abdy

=== Norman Lear Achievement Award in Television ===
- Mindy Kaling

=== Stanley Kramer Award ===
- Till
