= Iris Bahr =

American actress

- Born: The Bronx, New York, U.S.
- Education: Brown University, *Actors Center, New York
- Occupations: Actress, comedian, director, writer, producer, author

Iris Bahr (Hebrew: איריס בר) is an American actress, comedian, director, writer, author, producer, dramaturg and public speaking coach. She is best known for her recurring role as Rachel Heineman on Curb Your Enthusiasm, Perla on Hacks, her award-winning solo show DAI (enough), and her TV series Svetlana, which she wrote, directed, starred in and produced. The show was executive produced by Mark Cuban. She is the author of three published books, Dork Whore, Machu My Picchu and Book of Leon which she co-wrote with J. B. Smoove. Her books have been translated into German, Italian and Portuguese.

== Early life ==
Bahr was born in the Bronx, New York. At around twelve years old, her parents divorced and she moved to Israel with her mother. She served in the IDF for two years and held the rank of sergeant. As a young woman, she traveled throughout Southeast Asia and South America. She chronicles her adventures in her two memoirs, Dork Whore and Machu My Picchu. Both have been translated into several languages. She is a magna cum laude graduate of Brown University, where she studied neuropsychology and religious studies. Bahr performed neuroscientific and cancer research at Stanford University and Tel Aviv University.

== Career ==
Bahr guest starred on a variety of television shows, including guest appearances on Hacks, The Conners, Good Girls, Losing Alice, 9-1-1 (TV series), Strong Medicine, The Drew Carey Show, Friends, and The King of Queens, as well as recurring character Rachel Heineman on Curb Your Enthusiasm, appearing in four episodes, including the finale.

In 2006, Bahr appeared in her first movie lead role in playing Amy Butlin in Larry the Cable Guy: Health Inspector alongside Larry the Cable Guy. In May 2006 she had a supporting role as Leonard Hofstadter's co worker in the unaired pilot of The Big Bang Theory.

In November 2006, she opened her one woman show Dai (Enough) at the Culture Project in New York City. Bahr received the 2008 Lucille Lortel Award for Best Solo Performance for Dai, which also earned 2 Drama Desk Award nominations for Best Solo show and Best Sound Design. She also received a UK Stage Award Nomination for Outstanding Solo Performance. Bahr was invited to perform Dai at the United Nations for over 100 ambassadors and delegates. She premiered her third solo show, I Lost You There at the Cherry Lane Theatre in NYC in 2017. Her fourth solo show, a sequel to DAI, entitled DAI 2.0, was slated to open in NYC in April 2020 but was canceled due to Covid. She reimagined the show for streaming and premiered the show to a live audience online in December 2020. Her fifth solo show, "See You Tomorrow" was nominated for the 2024 Helen Hayes Award and premiered in Washington DC. It was slated to run in Toronto in July 2024. Her sixth solo show, "Stories from the Brink" premiered in Montreal in June 2024 and won the Frankie Storytelling Award. It completed a limited run at Soho Playhouse in New York City in 2026.

In 2007, Bahr was a part of the film Poughkeepsie Tapes. In this she plays an interviewed news broadcaster.

She moved to Los Angeles after a NY Parks Department truck injured her when it collided with her bicycle on Great Jones Street in New York.

Bahr's memoir entitled Dork Whore was published in 2007, and was translated into German, Italian and Portuguese. It became a bestseller in Germany. The sequel, Macchu My Picchu chronicles her travels through South America. She co-wrote Book of Leon, which came out in 2018, with comic JB Smoove.

Bahr did voice acting work for the Star Trek computer games Star Trek: Voyager – Elite Force, Star Trek: Elite Force II and Star Trek: Away Team, released in 2000, 2003 and 2001 respectively. She followed this up with an appearance on the last episode of Star Trek: Voyager, "Endgame" in 2001. She also voiced the character of Madeline Taylor in Soldier of Fortune II: Double Helix (2002).

Bahr also had a weekly commentary on NPR's Los Angeles affiliate KCRW entitled "Social Studies", featuring one of her characters - Svetlana, Russian lady of the night and proprietor of the "St. Petersburg House of Discreet Pleasure." Svetlana was also a recurring guest on The Marc Maron Show, and has done regular pieces for Kurt Andersen's show on WNYC's Studio 360. She is the host of the X-RAE podcast as her alter ego Rae Lynn Caspar White, a "Southern Intellectual, professional baby surrogate and sexpert". Her guests have included Lawrence O'Donnell, Doug Liman, author Roddy Doyle, Andie MacDowell, neuroscientists, academics and various comedians and artists. In 2023 she launched "The Near Death" podcast sharing both her own near death experiences and her guests.

She is currently filming "Joseph of Egypt" for Amazon.

== Filmography ==
=== Film ===
List of performances in film
Year	Title	Role	Notes
2002	Reality School	Student	Short film
2004	Exit 4A	Sibel	Short film
2005	The Unchosen Ones	Fiona, Rivka, Avivit and Aunt Rivka	Short film
2006	Larry the Cable Guy: Health Inspector	Amy Butlin	
2006	Mimesis	God	Short film
2007	Speed Dating	Lynn	Short film
2007	The Poughkeepsie Tapes	Aretha Creely	
2010	Fair Game	CPD Agent	
2010	The Last Exorcism	Iris Reisen	
2013	9 Full Moons	Keren	
2015	How to Grow Your Own	Nina	
2016	Justification	Stranger	Short film

=== Television ===
List of performances on television
Year	Title	Role	Notes
2001	Star Trek: Voyager	Female Cadet	Episode: "Endgame"
2002	The Rerun Show	Marcy D'arcy	Episode: "Married... with Children: Weenie Tot Lovers & Others Strangers/Bewitched: A Bunny for Tabitha"
2002	Strong Medicine	Ronnie Vongolia	Episode: "The Philadelphia Chromosome"
2003	Coupling	Alice	Episode: "A Foreign Affair"
2003	Columbo	Police Officer	Episode: "Columbo Likes the Nightlife"
2003	The Agency	Sara Shamir	1 episode
2003	Dragnet	Becky	Episode: "The Cutting of the Swath"
2003	The Drew Carey Show	Mindy	Episode: "Drew Answers the Belle"
2003	Friends	Glenda	Episode: "The One with Ross's Tan"
2004	Significant Others	Dave's Wife	Episode: "A Date, Fate and Jail Bait"
2005; 2024	Curb Your Enthusiasm	Rachel Heineman	4 episodes
2006	E-Ring	Rosa	Episode: "Hard Cell"
2006	The Big Bang Theory	Gilda	Uncredited; Episode: "Unaired Pilot"
2006	Commander in Chief	Tuba Ozel	Episode: "Happy Birthday, Madam President"
2007	Shorty McShorts' Shorts	—N/a	Voice role Episode: "Too Many Robots"
2007	State of Mind	Elizabeth Ellis	Episode: "Helpy Helperpants"
2009	Dollhouse	Detective Donovan	Episode: "Instinct"
2010–2011	Svetlana	Svetlana	Lead role; 23 episodes
2011	Eagleheart	Tiffany	Episode: "Death Punch"
2015	Revenge	Detective Adams	Episode: "Epitaph"
2015	The Brink	Talia Levy	3 episodes
2015	Blunt Talk	Doctor	2 episodes
2017	Elementary	Emily Gray	Episode: "The Ballad of Lady Frances"
2020	9-1-1	Arlene Branson	Episode: "Pinned"
2020	Good Girls	Clinic Doctor	Episode: "Egg Roll"
2021	Hacks	Perla	Episode: "New Eyes"
2022–2024	Monster High	Ms. Ziz	Voice

=== Video games ===
List of voice performances in video gaming
Year	Title	Role
2000	Star Trek: Voyager – Elite Force	Telsia Murphy
2001	Star Trek: Away Team	Sira D'Qua
2001	Star Trek: Armada II	—N/a
2002	Soldier of Fortune II: Double Helix	Madeline Taylor
2003	Star Trek: Elite Force II	Ensign Telsia Murphy
2017	Prey	Sarah Elazar

== Bibliography ==
- Bahr, Iris (2009). DAI : (enough): a play (1st ed.). Evanston, Illinois: Northwestern University Press. ISBN 9780810126435. LCCN 2009024606.
- Bahr, Iris (2007). Dork whore: my travels through Asia as a twenty-year-old pseudo-virgin (1st U.S. ed.). New York, New York: Bloomsbury, Distributed to the trade by Holtzbrinck Publishers. ISBN 9781596912342. LCCN 2006018506.
- Bahr, Iris (2011). Machu my Picchu: searching for sex, sanity and a soul mate in South America. maps by Piper Verlag. Guilford, Connecticut: Skirt!. ISBN 9780762772773. LCCN 2011024307.
