= 74th Writers Guild of America Awards =

74th WGA Awards
- Date: March 20, 2022
- Organized by: Writers Guild of America, East and the Writers Guild of America West

The 74th Writers Guild of America Awards were held on March 20, 2022, to honor the best writing in film, television and radio of 2021. The nominees for television and radio were announced on January 13, 2022, while the nominees for the film categories were announced on January 27, 2022.

== Winners and nominees ==
Winners are listed first and in bold.

=== Film ===
Best Original Screenplay
- **Don't Look Up – Adam McKay; story by Adam McKay & David Sirota**
  - Being the Ricardos – Aaron Sorkin
  - The French Dispatch – Wes Anderson; story by Wes Anderson, Roman Coppola, Hugo Guinness & Jason Schwartzman
  - King Richard – Zach Baylin
  - Licorice Pizza – Paul Thomas Anderson
Best Adapted Screenplay
- **CODA – Sian Heder; based on the film La Famille Bélier directed by Eric Lartigau and written by Victoria Bedos, Stanislas Carree de Malberg, Éric Lartigau & Thomas Bidegain** †
  - Dune – Jon Spaihts, Denis Villeneuve & Eric Roth; based on the novel by Frank Herbert
  - Nightmare Alley – Guillermo del Toro & Kim Morgan; based on the novel by William Lindsay Gresham
  - tick, tick... BOOM! – Steven Levenson; based on the musical by Jonathan Larson
  - West Side Story – Tony Kushner; based on the stage play, book by Arthur Laurents, music by Leonard Bernstein, lyrics by Stephen Sondheim, conceived, directed and choreographed by Jerome Robbins
Best Documentary Screenplay
- **Exposing Muybridge – Marc Shaffer**
  - Becoming Cousteau – Mark Monroe & Pax Wasserman
  - Like a Rolling Stone: The Life & Times of Ben Fong-Torres – Suzanne Joe Kai

=== Television ===
Drama Series
- **Succession (HBO) – Written by Jesse Armstrong, Jon Brown, Jamie Carragher, Ted Cohen, Francesca Gardiner, Lucy Prebble, Georgia Pritchett, Tony Roche, Susan Soon He Stanton, Will Tracy**
  - The Handmaid’s Tale (Hulu) – Written by Yahlin Chang, Nina Fiore, Dorothy Fortenberry, Jacey Heldrich, John Herrera, Bruce Miller, Aly Monroe, Kira Snyder, Eric Tuchman
  - Loki (Disney+) – Written by Bisha K. Ali, Jess Dweck, Elissa Karasik, Tom Kauffman, Eric Martin, Michael Waldron
  - The Morning Show (Apple TV+) – Written by Jeff Augustin, Brian Chamberlayne, Kerry Ehrin, Kristen Layden, Erica Lipez, Justin Matthews, Adam Milch, Stacy Osei-Kuffour, Torrey Speer, Scott Troy, Ali Vingiano
  - Yellowjackets (Showtime) – Written by Cameron Brent Johnson, Katherine Kearns, Jonathan Lisco, Ashley Lyle, Bart Nickerson, Liz Phang, Ameni Rozsa, Sarah L. Thompson, Chantelle M. Wells
Comedy Series
- **Hacks (HBO Max) – Written by Lucia Aniello, Joanna Calo, Jessica Chaffin, Paul W. Downs, Cole Escola, Janis E. Hirsch, Ariel Karlin, Katherine Kearns, Andrew Law, Joe Mande, Pat Regan, Samantha Riley, Michael Schur, Jen Statsky**
  - Curb Your Enthusiasm (HBO) – Written by Larry David, Steve Leff, Carol Leifer, Jeff Schaffer, Nathaniel Stein
  - Only Murders in the Building (Hulu) – Written by Thembi Banks, Matteo Borghese, Rachel Burger, Kirker Butler, Madeleine George, John Hoffman, Stephen Markley, Steve Martin, Kristin Newman, Ben Philippe, Kim Rosenstock, Ben Smith, Rob Turbovsky
  - Ted Lasso (Apple TV+) – Written by Jane Becker, Ashley Nicole Black, Leann Bowen, Sasha Garron, Brett Goldstein, Brendan Hunt, Joe Kelly, Bill Lawrence, Jamie Lee, Michael Orton-Toliver, Jason Sudeikis, Phoebe Walsh, Bill Wrubel
  - What We Do in the Shadows (FX) – Written by Jake Bender, Jemaine Clement, Zach Dunn, Shana Gohd, Sam Johnson, Chris Marcil, William Meny, Sarah Naftalis, Stefani Robinson, Marika Sawyer, Paul Simms, Lauren Wells
New Series
- **Hacks (HBO Max) – Written by Lucia Aniello, Joanna Calo, Jessica Chaffin, Paul W. Downs, Cole Escola, Janis E. Hirsch, Ariel Karlin, Katherine Kearns, Andrew Law, Joe Mande, Pat Regan, Samantha Riley, Michael Schur, Jen Statsky**
  - Loki (Disney+) – Written by Bisha K. Ali, Jess Dweck, Elissa Karasik, Tom Kauffman, Eric Martin, Michael Waldron
  - Only Murders in the Building (Hulu) – Written by Thembi Banks, Matteo Borghese, Rachel Burger, Kirker Butler, Madeleine George, John Hoffman, Stephen Markley, Steve Martin, Kristin Newman, Ben Philippe, Kim Rosenstock, Ben Smith, Rob Turbovsky
  - Reservation Dogs (FX) – Written by Tazbah Rose Chavez, Sydney Freeland, Sterlin Harjo, Migizi Pensoneau, Tommy Pico, Taika Waititi, Bobby Wilson
  - Yellowjackets (Showtime) – Written by Cameron Brent Johnson, Katherine Kearns, Jonathan Lisco, Ashley Lyle, Bart Nickerson, Liz Phang, Ameni Rozsa, Sarah L. Thompson, Chantelle M. Wells
Long Form – Original
- **Mare of Easttown (HBO) – Written by Brad Ingelsby**
  - American Horror Story: Double Feature (FX) – Written by Brad Falchuk, Manny Coto, Ryan Murphy, Kristen Reidel, Reilly Smith
  - Midnight Mass (Netflix) – Written by James Flanagan, Mike Flanagan, Elan Gale, Jeff Howard, Dani Parker
  - Them: Covenant (Prime Video) – Written by Christina Ham, Little Marvin, David Matthews, Dominic Orlando, Seth Zvi Rosenfeld, Francine Volpe
  - The White Lotus (HBO) – Written by Mike White
Long Form – Adapted
- **Maid (Netflix) – Written by Bekah Brunstetter, Marcus Gardley, Michelle Denise Jackson, Colin McKenna, Molly Smith Metzler; Inspired by the book Maid: Hard Work, Low Pay, and a Mother's Will to Survive by Stephanie Land**
  - Halston (Netflix) – Written by Ian Brennan, Ted Malawer, Ryan Murphy, Tim Pinckney, Sharr White, Kristina Woo; Based on the book Simply Halston by Steven Gaines
  - Impeachment: American Crime Story (FX) – Written by Flora Birnbaum, Sarah Burgess, Halley Feiffer, Daniel Pearle; Based on the book A Vast Conspiracy by Jeffrey Toobin
  - The Underground Railroad (Prime Video) – Written by Jihan Crowther, Allison Davis, Jacqueline Hoyt, Barry Jenkins, Nathan C. Parker, Adrienne Rush; Based on the novel by Colson Whitehead
  - WandaVision (Disney+) – Written by Peter Cameron, Mackenzie Dohr, Laura Donney, Bobak Esfarjani, Chuck Hayward, Megan McDonnell, Jac Schaeffer, Cameron Squires; Based on the Marvel Comics
Short Form New Media – Adapted
- **Debunking Borat (Prime Video) – Written by Robyn Adams, Paul Hogan, Jack Youngelson**
  - Calls (Apple TV+) – Written by Fede Álvarez, Nick Cuse, Aidan Fitzgerald, Noah Gardner, Rodo Sayagues
  - The Expanse: One Ship (Prime Video) – Written by Wes Chatham, Julianna Damewood, Mark Fergus, Hawk Ostby, Glenton Richards
Animation
- **"Planteau" – Tuca & Bertie (Adult Swim) – Written by Lisa Hanawalt**
  - "An Incon-Wheelie-ent Truth" – Bob's Burgers (Fox) – Written by Dan Fybel
  - "Loft in Bedslation" – Bob's Burgers (Fox) – Written by Jameel Saleem
  - "Must Love Dogs" – Family Guy (Fox) – Written by Daniel Peck
  - "Portrait of a Lackey on Fire" – The Simpsons (Fox) – Written by Rob LaZebnik & Johnny LaZebnik
  - "The Star of the Backstage" – The Simpsons (Fox) – Written by Elisabeth Kiernen Averick
Episodic Drama
- **"Retired Janitors of Idaho" – Succession (HBO) – Written by Tony Roche & Susan Soon He Stanton**
  - "1883" – 1883 (Paramount+) – Written by Taylor Sheridan
  - "Birth Mother" – This Is Us (NBC) – Written by Eboni Freeman & Kay Oyegun
  - "La Amara Vita" – The Morning Show (Apple TV+) – Written by Kerry Ehrin & Scott Troy
  - "The New Normal" – New Amsterdam (NBC) – Written by David Schulner
  - "Testimony" – The Handmaid’s Tale (Hulu) – Written by Kira Snyder
Episodic Comedy
- **"Alone At Last"** – **The Great (Hulu) – Written by Tony McNamara**
  - "All Sales Final" – Superstore (NBC) – Teleplay by Jonathan Green & Gabe Miller; Story by Justin Spitzer
  - "Enlightened Dave" – Dave (FX) – Written by Luvh Rakhe & Lee Sung Jin
  - "Episode One: True Crime" – Only Murders in the Building (Hulu) – Written by Steve Martin & John Hoffman
  - "F*ckin’ Rez Dogs" – Reservation Dogs (FX) – Written by Sterlin Harjo & Taika Waititi
  - "Pilot" – The Wonder Years (ABC) – Written by Saladin K. Patterson
Comedy/Variety – Talk Series
- **Conan (TBS) – Head Writer: Matt O'Brien; Writers: Jose Arroyo, Glenn Boozan, Daniel Cronin, Andres du Bouchet, Jessie Gaskell, Skyler Higley, Brian Kiley, Laurie Kilmartin, Todd Levin, Levi MacDougall, Conan O'Brien, Andy Richter, Frank Smiley, Mike Sweeney**
  - Desus & Mero (Showtime) – Writers: Daniel "Desus Nice" Baker, Josh Gondelman, Robert Kornhauser, Joel "The Kid Mero" Martinez, Robert A. McRae, Heben Nigatu, Mike Pielocik, Julia Young
  - Last Week Tonight with John Oliver (HBO) – Writers: Johnathan Appel, Ali Barthwell, Tim Carvell, Liz Hynes, Greg Iwinski, Mark Kramer, Daniel O'Brien, John Oliver, Owen Parsons, Charlie Redd, Joanna Rothkopf, Chrissy Shackelford, Ben Silva, Seena Vali
  - The Problem with Jon Stewart (Apple TV+) – Head Writer: Chelsea Devantez; Writers: Kristen Acimovic, Henrik Blix, Rob Christensen, Jay Jurden, Alexa Loftus, Tocarra Mallard, Robby Slowik, Jon Stewart, Kasaun Wilson
Comedy/Variety – Specials
- **Full Frontal Wants to Take Your Guns (TBS) – Head Writers: Kristen Bartlett, Mike Drucker; Writers: Samantha Bee, Pat Cassels, Sean Crespo, Mike Drucker, Miles Kahn, Chris Thompson, Holly Walker, Allison Silverman; Writing Supervised by Joe Grossman, Sahar Rizvi; Special Material by Michael Rhoa**
  - 43rd Annual Kennedy Center Honors (CBS) – Written by Dave Boone
  - Drew Michael: Red Blue Green (HBO) – Written by Drew Michael
  - The Tony Awards Presents: Broadway's Back! (CBS) – Written by Dave Boone; Special Material by Amber Ruffin, Marc Shaiman, Daniel J. Watts, Scott Wittman; Opening Number by Amber Ruffin, Marc Shaiman, Scott Wittman
  - Yearly Departed (Prime Video) – Head Writer: Bess Kalb; Writers: Karen Chee, Akilah Green, Franchesca Ramsey, Jocelyn Richard
Comedy/Variety – Sketch Series
- **I Think You Should Leave with Tim Robinson (Netflix) – Writers: Zach Kanin, Tim Robinson, John Solomon**
  - How To with John Wilson (HBO) – Writers: Alice Gregory, Michael Koman, Conner O'Malley, Susan Orlean, John Wilson
  - PAUSE with Sam Jay (HBO) – Writers: Emmy Blotnick, Ryan Donahue, Zack Fox, Megan Gailey, Robin M. Henry, Sam Jay, Langston Kerman, Jak Knight
  - Saturday Night Live (NBC) – Head Writer: Michael Che, Anna Drezen, Colin Jost, Kent Sublette; Senior Writer: Bryan Tucker; Weekend Update Head Writer: Pete Schultz; Weekend Update Writers: Megan Callahan-Shah, Dennis McNicholas, Josh Patten, Mark Steinbach; Supervising Writers: Alison Gates, Fran Gillespie, Sudi Green, Streeter Seidell; Writers: James Anderson, Dan Bulla, Steven Castillo, Mike DiCenzo, Billy Domineau, Alex English, John Higgins, Steve Higgins, Martin Herlihy, Vannessa Jackson, Sam Jay, Erik Kenward, Tesha Kondrat, Dan Licata, Lorne Michaels, Ben Marshall, Jake Nordwind, Jasmine Pierce, Gary Richardson, Ben Silva, Emily Spivey, Will Stephen, Celeste Yim
  - That Damn Michael Che (HBO Max) – Head Writer: Michael Che; Writing Supervised by: Gary Richardson; Writers: Rosebud Baker, Reggie Conquest, Godfrey Danchimah Jr., Calise Hawkins, Kevin Iso, Sam Jay, Matt Richards, Wil Sylvince
Quiz and Audience Participation
- **Baking It (Peacock) – Writers: Neil Casey, Jessica McKenna, Zach Reino, Niccole Thurman**
  - Capital One College Bowl (NBC) – Head Writer: Scott Saltzburg; Writers: Rosemarie DiSalvo, Ryan Hopak, Jon Macks, Karissa Noel, Todd Sachs, Doug Shaffer, Grant Taylor, Bennett Webber
  - The Chase (ABC) – Head Writer: David Levinson Wilk; Writers: Erik Agard, Eliza Bayne, Kyle Beakley, Megan Broussard, Robert King, Amy Ozols, Bobby Patton, Ellen Teitel, Ari Yolkut
  - Jeopardy! (Syndicated) – Writers: Michael Davies, John Duarte, Mark Gaberman, Debbie Griffin, Michele Loud, Robert McClenaghan, Jim Rhine, Mike Richards, Billy Wisse
Daytime Drama
- **Days of Our Lives (NBC) – Head Writer: Ron Carlivati; Writers: Lorraine Broderick, Joanna Cohen, Carolyn Culliton, Richard Culliton, Jamey Giddens, David Kreizman, Rebecca McCarty, Ryan Quan, Dave Ryan, Katherine D. Schock, Elizabeth Snyder**
  - General Hospital (ABC) – Head Writers: Chris Van Etten, Dan O’Connor; Associate Head Writer: Anna T. Cascio; Writers: Barbara Bloom, Suzanne Flynn, Charlotte Gibson, Lucky Gold, Kate Hall, Elizabeth Korte, Shannon Peace, David Rupel, Lisa Seidman, Scott Sickles
  - The Young and the Restless (CBS) – Head Writer: Amanda L. Beall; Writers: Susan Banks, Jeff Beldner, Sara A. Bibel, Brent Boyd, Susan Dansby, Christopher Dunn, Sara Endsley, Janice Ferri Esser, Marin Gazzaniga, Lynn Martin, Natalie Minardi Slater, Teresa Zimmerman

==== Children's ====
Children's Script – Episodic, Long form and Specials
- **"The Tale of the Midnight Magic" – Are You Afraid of the Dark? (Nickelodeon) – Written by JT Billings, Alex Ebel**
  - "A Big Favor for Grampy/A Fair Way to Bounce" – Donkey Hodie (PBS Kids) – Written by Adam Rudman & David Rudman, Joey Mazzarino
  - "Park Ranger Percy / Lizard Lizzy" – Helpsters (Apple TV+) – Written by Annabeth Bondor-Stone, Connor White, Liz Hara
  - "Rice" – Waffles + Mochi (Netflix) – Written by Lyric Lewis
  - "Which Witch?" – Just Beyond (Disney+) – Written by Mitali Jahagirdar

==== Documentary ====
Documentary Script – Current Events
- **"The Healthcare Divide" – FRONTLINE (PBS) – Written by Rick Young**
  - "The Jihadist" – FRONTLINE (PBS) – Written by Martin Smith & Marcela Gaviria
Documentary Script – Other than Current Events
- **"Citizen Hearst, Part One" – American Experience (PBS) – Written by Gene Tempest**
  - "A Writer" – Hemingway (PBS) – Written by Geoffrey C. Ward
  - "Citizen" – Amend: The Fight for America (Netflix) – Written by Sasha Stewart & Robe Imbriano
  - "Round One" – Muhammad Ali (PBS) – Written by David McMahon & Sarah Burns

==== News ====
News Script – Regularly Scheduled, Bulletin, or Breaking Report
- **"The Unequal Recession" – 60 Minutes (CBS News) – Written by Katie Kerbstat Jacobson, Scott Pelley, Nicole Young**
  - "Against All Enemies" – 60 Minutes (CBS News) – Written by Katie Kerbstat Jacobson, Scott Pelley, Nicole Young
  - "Democracy Lost" – 60 Minutes (CBS News) – Written by Oriana Zill de Granados, Sharyn Alfonsi
News Script – Analysis, Feature, or Commentary
- **"Handcuffed to the Truth" – 60 Minutes (CBS News) – Written by Katie Kerbstat Jacobson, Scott Pelley, Nicole Young**
  - "The Fall of Kandahar" – Vice News Tonight (Vice on TV) – Written by Amel Guettatfi, Ben C. Solomon
  - "Unpacking How Child Welfare and Foster Care Fails Black Children" – Unpack That (The Root) – Written by Joel Kahn, Felice León
  - "The Unstudied Link Between the COVID Vaccine and Periods" – Vice News Tonight (Vice on TV) – Written by Caitlin Bladt
  - “Woman in Motion: Star Trek's Nichelle Nichols and The Transformation of NASA” (CBS Saturday Morning), Written by Daniel Elias, Michelle Miller; CBS News
Digital News
- **"Men's Rights Asians: Think This Is Their Moment" (Slate) – Written by Aaron Mak**
  - "An Oral History of the Longest-Ever Broadway Shutdown" (Slate) – Written by Madeline Ducharme
  - "Knives Out: Why 'Hacks' Works" (The Ringer) – Written by Katie Baker
  - "We Get to Hear Them Training to Kill Us" (Slate) – Written by Christina Cauterucci
  - "What if the Unorthodox Arizona Audit Declares Trump Won?" (Slate) – Written by Jeremy Stahl

=== Radio ===
Radio News Script – Regularly Scheduled, Bulletin, or Breaking Report
- **"Surfside Condo Collapse (CBS World News Roundup Late Edition)" (CBS News Radio) – Written by Kathleen M. Biggins**
  - "Silence the Mics: Tributes to Some Famous Broadcasters" (CBS Radio) – Written by Gail Lee
  - "World News This Week – Week of August 16, 2021" (ABC Audio) – Written by Robert Hawley
  - "World News This Week – Week of January 8, 2021" (ABC Audio) – Written by Joy Piazza
  - "World News This Week – Week of September 3, 2021" (ABC Audio) – Written by Joan B. Harris
Radio News Script – Analysis, Feature, or Commentary
- **"The Tasmanian Devil Tattoo (Decoder Ring)" (Slate Podcast) – Written by Benjamin Frisch**
  - "When the Culture War Comes for Your Job (What Next)" (Slate Podcast) – Written by Mary Harris
Radio News Script – Documentary
- **"One Year: 1977 'The Miracle Cure'" (Slate Podcast) – Written by Evan Chung**
  - "Our Year (What Next)" (Slate Podcast) – Written by Mary Harris
  - "That Seattle Muzak Sound (Decoder Ring)" (Slate Podcast) – Written by Benjamin Frisch
  - "Who Killed the Segway? (Decoder Ring)" (Slate Podcast) – Written by Dan Kois

=== Promotional writing ===
On-Air Promotion – Television or Radio
- **"Celebrating Powerful Female Leads: Trailers for The Equalizer & Why Women Kill" (CBS) – Written by Molly Neylan**
  - "CSI: Vegas Trailers" (CBS) – Written by Erial Tompkins
