= American Cinema Editors Awards 2022 =

72nd ACE Eddie Awards
- Presented by: American Cinema Editors
- Date: March 5, 2022
- Site: Ace Hotel, Downtown Los Angeles, California

Highlights
- Best Film: Drama: King Richard
- Best Film: Comedy: Tick, Tick... Boom!

The 72nd American Cinema Editors Eddie Awards were presented on March 5, 2022, at the Ace Hotel in Downtown Los Angeles, honoring the best editors in films and television of 2021. The nominees were announced on January 27, 2022.

Lillian Benson and Richard Chew both received the Career Achievement Award.

== Winners and nominees ==
=== Film ===
Best Edited Feature Film (Dramatic)	Best Edited Feature Film (Comedy)
King Richard – Pamela Martin; Belfast – Úna Ní Dhonghaíle; Dune – Joe Walker; No Time to Die – Tom Cross and Elliot Graham; The Power of the Dog – Peter Sciberras	tick, tick... BOOM! – Myron Kerstein and Andrew Weisblum; Cruella – Tatiana S. Riegel; Don't Look Up – Hank Corwin; The French Dispatch – Andrew Weisblum; Licorice Pizza – Andy Jurgensen
Best Edited Animated Feature Film	Best Edited Documentary (Feature)
Encanto – Jeremy Milton; Luca – Catherine Apple and Jason Hudak; The Mitchells vs. the Machines – Greg Levitan; Raya and the Last Dragon – Fabienne Rawley and Shannon Stein; Sing 2 – Gregory Perler	Summer of Soul (...Or, When the Revolution Could Not Be Televised) – Joshua L. Pearson; Flee – Janus Billeskov Jansen; The Rescue – Bob Eisenhardt; Val – Ting Poo and Leo Scott; The Velvet Underground – Affonso Gonçalves and Adam Kurnitz
Best Edited Documentary (Non-Theatrical)
The Beatles: Get Back: "Part 3: Days 17-22" – Jabez Olssen (Disney+); 100 Foot Wave: "Sea Monsters" – Connor Culhane, Adrienne Gits, Abhay Sofsky, and Brandon Valentin (HBO); 1971: The Year That Music Changed Everything: "Starman" – Sam Blair (Apple TV+); Allen v. Farrow: "Episode One" – Parker Laramie, Sara Newens, and Mikaela Shwer (HBO); Billie Eilish: The World's a Little Blurry – Greg Finton and Lindsay Utz (Apple TV+)

=== Television ===
Best Edited Drama Series	Best Edited Single-Camera Comedy Series
Succession: "All the Bells Say" – Ken Eluto (HBO); Euphoria: "Fuck Anyone Who's Not a Sea Blob" – Nikola Boyanov and Julio C. Pérez IV (HBO); Lupin: "Chapter 1" – Jean-Daniel Fernandez-Qundez (Netflix); Squid Game: "Gganbu" – Nam Na-young (Netflix); Succession: "Chiantishire" – Jane Rizzo (HBO)	Hacks: "1.69 Million" – Susan Vaill (HBO Max); Curb Your Enthusiasm: "Igor, Gregor, & Timor" – Thomas Foligno and Steven Rasch (HBO); Curb Your Enthusiasm: "The Mormon Advantage" – Chris Chandler and Roger Nygard (HBO); Ted Lasso: "No Weddings and a Funeral" – A.J. Catoline (Apple TV+); Ted Lasso: "Rainbow" – Melissa McCoy (Apple TV+)
Best Edited Multi-Camera Comedy Series	Best Edited Limited Series
Kevin Can F**k Himself: "Live Free or Die" – Daniel Schalk (AMC); Kevin Can F**k Himself: "Fixed" – Kenneth LaMere (AMC); Kevin Can F**k Himself: "The Grand Victorian" – Ivan Victor (AMC)	Mare of Easttown: "Illusions" – Amy E. Duddleston (HBO); Dopesick: "First Bottle" – Douglas Crise (Hulu); Mare of Easttown: "Fathers" – Amy E. Duddleston and Naomi Sunrise Filoramo (HBO); The White Lotus: "Departures" – John M. Valerio (HBO); The White Lotus: "Mysterious Monkeys" – Heather Persons (HBO)
Best Edited Motion Picture (Non-Theatrical)	Best Edited Non-Scripted Series
Oslo – Jay Rabinowitz (HBO); Kate – Sandra Montiel and Elísabet Ronaldsdóttir (Netflix); Lupe – Shiran Carolyn Amir (HBO)	Formula 1: Drive to Survive: "Man on Fire" – Dan Ablett, Kevin Austin, Otto Burnham, Shane McCormack, and Graham Taylor (Netflix); MasterChef: Legends: "Semi Final Pt 3 Chef Showdown" – Roger Bartlett, Matt Cluett, Greg Fitzsimmons, Dylan Hart, Ezra Hudson, James Messina, Rod Schultheiss, Austin Scott, and Molly Shock (Fox); Queer Eye: "Angel Gets Her Wings" – Sean Gill and Nova Taylor (Netflix)
Best Edited Variety Talk/Sketch Show or Special	Best Edited Animation (Non-Theatrical)
Bo Burnham: Inside – Bo Burnham (Netflix); A Black Lady Sketch Show: "Sister, May I Call You Oshun?" – Daysha Broadway, Stephanie Filo, and Jessica Hernández (HBO); Last Week Tonight with John Oliver: "Union Busting" – Ryan Barger and Anthony Milae (HBO)	Bob's Burgers: "Vampire Disco Death Dance" – Jeremy Reuben (Fox); Rick and Morty: "Gotron Jerrysis Rickvangelion" – Lee Harting (Adult Swim); What If...?: "What If... Ultron Won?" – Graham Fisher and Joel Fisher (Disney+)
