= Susan Vaill =

American film and television editor, director and producer

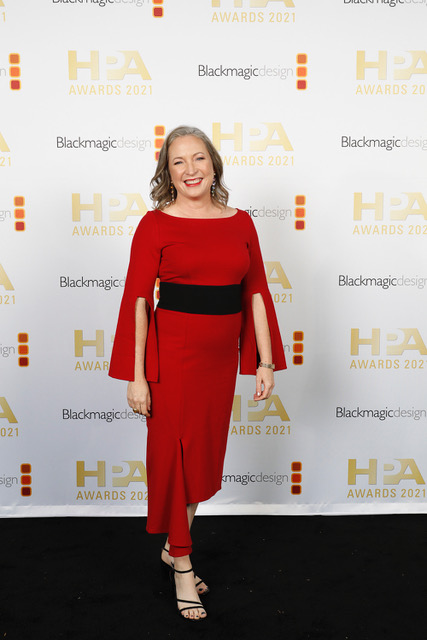
- Born: Los Angeles, California, U.S.
- Occupation(s): Editor, writer, director, producer
- Years active: 2002–present

Susan Vaill, ACE, is an American film and television editor, director and producer. She is best known for her work on the television series Hacks, This Is Us, and Grey's Anatomy.

== Life and career ==
Susan was born in Los Angeles. She and her twin sister Sarah Vaill appeared as child actors in 1970s film and television, most notably Sunshine (1973) and Bound For Glory (1976). She studied art history at Williams College and earned her MFA in film production at the USC School of Cinematic Arts. Susan edited 70 episodes of Grey's Anatomy and directed 3 episodes. She is a member of the Directors Guild of America and the American Cinema Editors.

== Filmography ==
Year	Title	Contribution	Note
2022	The Time Traveler's Wife	Editor	3 episodes
2021	Hacks	Editor	4 episodes
2020	Space Force	Editor	3 episodes
2019	Lodge 49	Editor	3 episodes
2018-2019	This Is Us	Editor	6 episodes
2018	How May We Hate You?	Editor	TV movie
2017-2018	Me, Myself & I	Editor	6 episodes
2017	Doubt	Editor	4 episodes
2016	Drew	Editor	TV movie
2015-2016	Grandfathered	Editor	11 episodes
2015	A Sort of Homecoming	Editor	Feature film
2005-2015	Grey's Anatomy	Editor and Director	70 episodes
2012	California Winter	Editor	Feature film
2010	Seattle Grace: Message of Hope	Editor	TV series
2010	Huge	Editor	2 episodes
2010	Seattle Grace: On Call	Editor, Director and Producer	2 episodes
2009-2010	Grey's Anatomy: The Webisodes	Director and Producer	3 episodes
2009	Legend of Billy Fail	Editor	Feature film
2008	Army Wives	Editor	1 episode
2007	Grey's Anatomy: Come Rain or Shine	Editor	TV movie
2007	Grey's Anatomy: Every Moment Counts	Editor	TV movie
2007	Finding Shangri-La	Editor	Documentary
2006	Grey's Anatomy: Complications of the Heart	Editor	TV movie
2006	Grey's Anatomy: Under Pressure	Editor	TV movie
2006	Women with Altitude: Mind Over Mountains	Editor	TV movie
2006	Save Me	Editor	Short film
2002	Valette	Director, writer, Editor and Producer	Short film
2002	Pigeon	Producer	Short film
2001	Thunderbird	Producer	Short film
2000	Coming Home	Producer	Short film

== Awards and nominations ==
Year	Result	Award	Category	Work	Ref.
2022	Won	American Cinema Editors	Best Edited Single-Camera Comedy Series	Hacks: 1.69 Million	
2021	Won	Hollywood Professional Association	Outstanding Editing – Episodic or Non-theatrical Feature (30 Minutes and Under)	Hacks: Falling	
2021	Nominated	Primetime Emmy Awards	Outstanding Single-Camera Picture Editing for a Comedy Series	Hacks: Primm	
