= Stephen Markley =

American writer (born 1983)

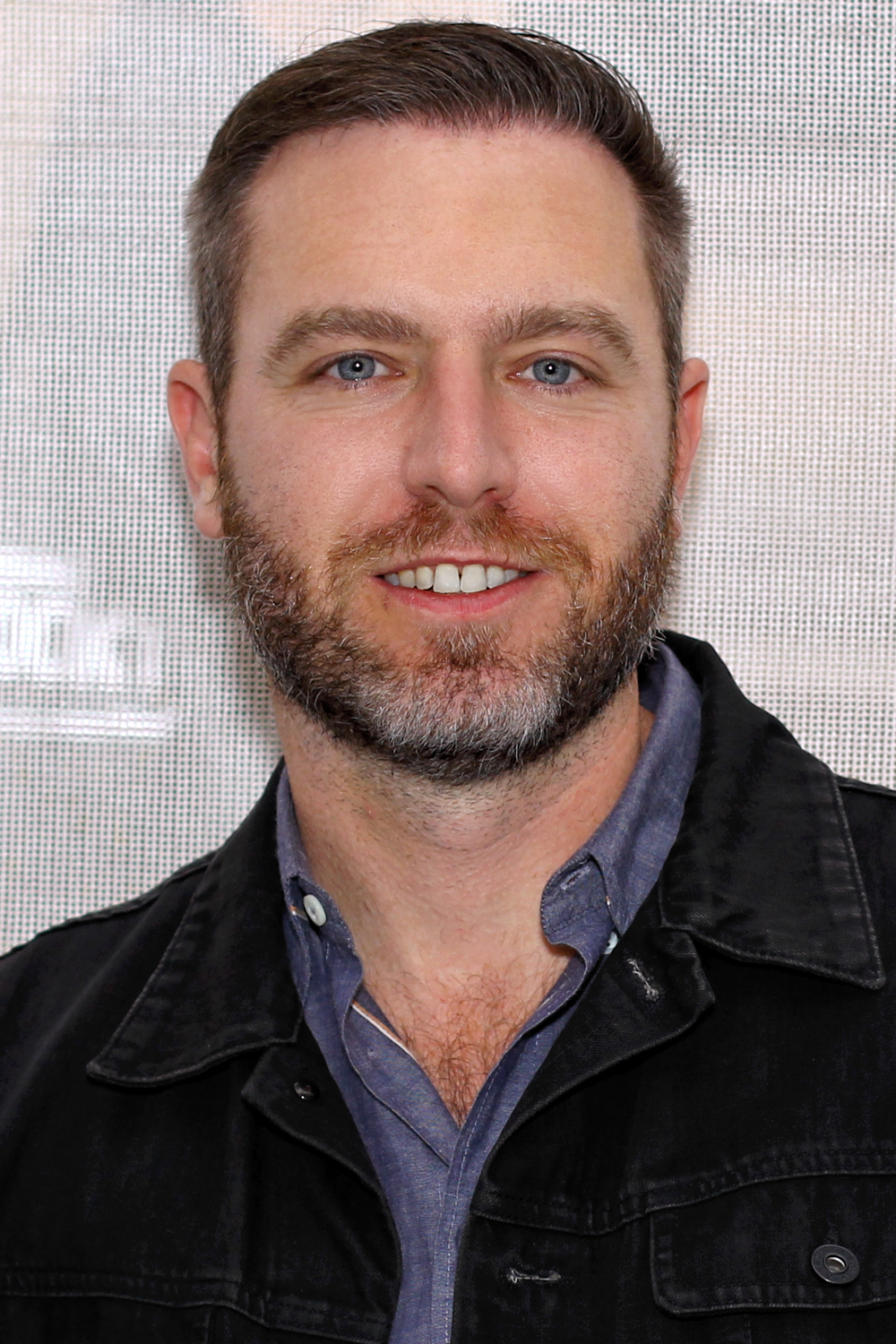
- Markley at the 2023 Texas Book Festival
- Born: 2 October 1983 (age 42); Mount Vernon, Ohio, U.S.
- Occupation: Writer

Stephen Markley (born October 2, 1983 in Mount Vernon, Ohio) is an American journalist and author, whose work includes memoirs and novels. He was born in Ohio and is a graduate of Miami University and the Iowa Writers' Workshop.

Markley's first novel Ohio (2018) takes place during a single evening. His second novel The Deluge (2023) is a dystopian epic about climate change spanning the years 2013 through to the 2030s. The New York Times review said of it that the "dystopia is realistic and nuanced, grim but playful, setting Markley’s book apart from the tsunami of recent climate-change literature." The New York Times named The Deluge one of the 100 Notable Books of 2023.

Markley is reportedly working on an adaptation of Ohio for an HBO series to be produced by Sam Levinson.

== Books ==
Source: WorldCat

=== Nonfiction ===
- Publish This Book (2010)
- The Great Dysmorphia (2012)
- Tales of Iceland (2013)

=== Fiction ===
- Ohio (2018)
- The Deluge (2023)
