= Lucia Aniello =

American writer and television producer

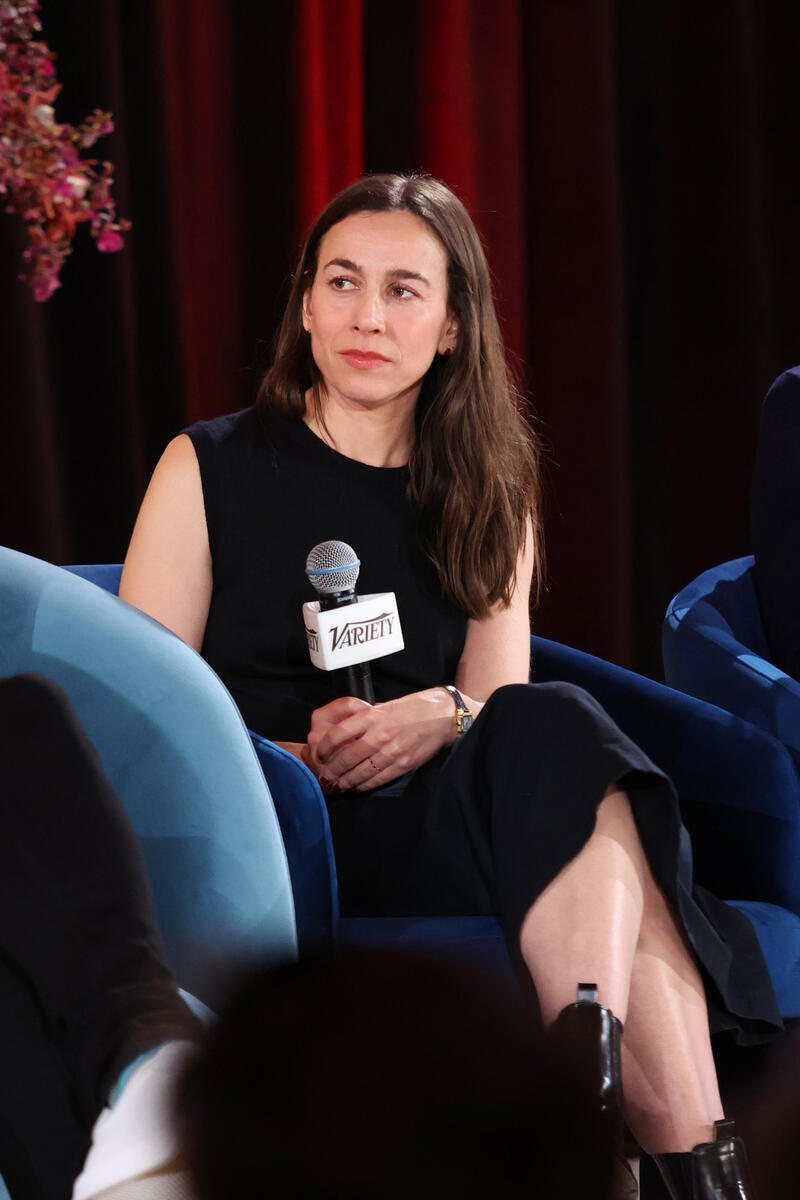
- Born: January 10, 1983 (age 43); Italy
- Citizenship: American
- Education: Columbia University
- Occupations: Film director; writer; producer
- Years active: 2007–present
- Spouse: Paul W. Downs (m. 2021)
- Children: 1

Lucia Aniello (born January 10, 1983) is an Italian-born American director, writer, and producer best known for her work on Hacks, for which she won multiple Emmy Awards, and Broad City. She has directed and written episodes of both shows, as well as the miniseries Time Traveling Bong and the 2017 film Rough Night.

== Early life ==
Aniello was born in Italy and grew up in Hadley, Massachusetts, where her parents owned Italian restaurants, before moving to New York City. In 2004, she graduated from Columbia University, where she was a film and media studies major and studied with film critic Andrew Sarris. She was in Sigma Delta Tau sorority. She also played varsity tennis for Columbia.

== Career ==
Aniello is an alumna of the Upright Citizens Brigade, an improvisational and sketch comedy group founded in 1990 by a group of comedians including Amy Poehler who is an executive producer of Broad City.

Aniello and Paul W. Downs met at an Upright Citizens Brigade Level One improvisational comedy class. Aniello and Downs began working together on a series of digital shorts and improv. They started their own website and comedy production company called Paulilu Productions. Together they have been writing, directing and acting in digital shorts since 2007. Some of their most well-known web series include The Diary of Zac Efron and The Real Housewives of South Boston.

=== Work on Broad City ===
Aniello also met Ilana Glazer of Broad City through the same Upright Citizens Brigade class where she met Downs. As Aniello and Downs began to make digital shorts and build the foundations of Paulilu, Glazer and Abbi Jacobson worked on the prototype of Broad City. The two comedic duos occasionally acted in each other's shorts or directed them. When Broad City moved to television Glazer and Jacobson asked Aniello to direct the pilot and cast Downs as Trey, the trainer and boss of Jacobson's character on the show. After the show was picked up by Comedy Central, they asked both Aniello and Downs to join the group of writers for the show.

=== Current work ===
Aniello also co-created Time Traveling Bong. Her interest in the subject began in college when she wrote a thesis on time-travel movies at Columbia University. The movie is a stoner film comedy about two cousins who acquire a bong that acts as a time traveling device.

Aniello directed and, with Downs, co-wrote the comedy Rough Night, which was released in June 2017. It stars Scarlett Johansson, Zoe Kravitz, Kate McKinnon, Jillian Bell, Ilana Glazer, Demi Moore, Ty Burrell and Colton Haynes. During the time of the film's release, Aniello was the first woman to direct an R-rated comedy in nearly 20 years.

In 2020, she directed and executive produced the Comedy Central series Awkwafina Is Nora from Queens as well as Netflix's Baby-Sitters Club.

In 2023, Aniello directed the Apple holiday commercial “Fuzzy Feelings” which won “Best Commercial” at the 2024 Emmy Awards.

In May 2020, it was announced that Aniello would be showrunning and directing the HBO Max show Hacks, starring Jean Smart. Hacks, co-created with Downs, ran for 5 seasons and concluded in 2026.

As of 2021, Aniello and Paul W. Downs signed a deal with Warner Bros. Television.

== Personal life ==
Aniello resides in Los Angeles with her husband and comedic partner Paul W. Downs, with whom she co-wrote Rough Night. After having their wedding delayed for 16 months due to the COVID-19 pandemic, Aniello and Downs got married in a September 2021 intimate ceremony in Italy. A week later, they publicly announced their wedding at the 73rd Primetime Emmy Awards during Aniello's acceptance speech after winning the award for Outstanding Directing for a Comedy Series. They have a son, born in 2022.

== Awards and nominations ==
Year	Award	Category	Nominated work	Result	Ref.
2021	Daytime Emmy Awards	Outstanding Directing Team for a Preschool, Children's or Family Viewing Program	The Baby-Sitters Club: Season 1	Nominated	
2021	Daytime Emmy Awards	Outstanding Writing Team for a Preschool, Children's or Family Viewing Program	The Baby-Sitters Club: Season 1	Nominated	
2021	Daytime Emmy Awards	Outstanding Preschool, Children's or Family Viewing Program	The Baby-Sitters Club: Season 1	Nominated	
2021	Primetime Emmy Awards	Outstanding Comedy Series	Hacks (as Executive Producer)	Nominated	
2021	Primetime Emmy Awards	Outstanding Directing for a Comedy Series	Hacks – (Episode: "There Is No Line (Pilot)")	Won	
2021	Primetime Emmy Awards	Outstanding Writing for a Comedy Series	Hacks – (Episode: "There Is No Line (Pilot)") (Shared with Paul W. Downs and Jen Statsky)	Won	
2021	Directors Guild of America Awards	Outstanding Directorial Achievement in Comedy Series	Hacks	Won	
2021	Writers Guild of America Awards	Comedy Series	Hacks	Won	
2021	Writers Guild of America Awards	New Series	Hacks	Won	
2021	Golden Globe Awards	Best Television Series – Musical or Comedy	Hacks (as Executive Producer)	Won	
2021	AFI Awards	Outstanding Television Program of the Year	Hacks	Won	
2021	Peabody Awards	Peabody Award, Entertainment Honoree	Hacks	Won	
2022	Primetime Emmy Awards	Outstanding Comedy Series	Hacks (as Executive Producer)	Nominated	
2022	Primetime Emmy Awards	Outstanding Directing for a Comedy Series	Hacks – (Episode: "There Will Be Blood")	Nominated	
2022	Primetime Emmy Awards	Outstanding Writing for a Comedy Series	Hacks – (Episode: "The One, The Only") (Shared with Paul W. Downs and Jen Statsky)	Nominated	
2022	Writers Guild of America Awards	Episodic Comedy	Hacks – (Episode: "The One, The Only") (Shared with Paul W. Downs and Jen Statsky)	Won	
2022	Writers Guild of America Awards	Comedy Series	Hacks	Nominated	
2022	Producers Guild of America Awards	Outstanding Producer of Episodic Television	Hacks (as Executive Producer)	Nominated	
2022	AFI Awards	Outstanding Television Program of the Year	Hacks	Won	
2022	Children's and Family Emmy Awards	Outstanding Children's or Family Viewing Series	The Baby-Sitters Club (as Executive Producer)	Won	
2024	Primetime Emmy Awards	Outstanding Comedy Series	Hacks (as Executive Producer)	Won	
2024	Primetime Emmy Awards	Outstanding Directing for a Comedy Series	Hacks – (Episode: "Bulletproof")	Nominated	
2024	Primetime Emmy Awards	Outstanding Writing for a Comedy Series	Hacks – (Episode: "Bulletproof") (Shared with Paul W. Downs and Jen Statsky)	Won	
2024	Golden Globe Awards	Best Television Series – Musical or Comedy	Hacks (as Executive Producer)	Won	
2024	Directors Guild of America Awards	Outstanding Directorial Achievement in Comedy Series	Hacks – (Episode: "Bulletproof")	Won	
2024	Writers Guild of America Awards	Episodic Comedy	Hacks – (Episode: "Bulletproof") (Shared with Paul W. Downs and Jen Statsky)	Won	
2024	Writers Guild of America Awards	Comedy Series	Hacks	Won	
2025	Primetime Emmy Awards	Outstanding Comedy Series	Hacks (as Executive Producer)	Nominated	
2025	Primetime Emmy Awards	Outstanding Directing for a Comedy Series	Hacks – (Episode: "A Slippery Slope")	Nominated	
2025	Primetime Emmy Awards	Outstanding Writing for a Comedy Series	Hacks – (Episode: "A Slippery Slope") (Shared with Paul W. Downs and Jen Statsky)	Nominated	
2025	Golden Globe Awards	Best Television Series – Musical or Comedy	Hacks (as Executive Producer)	Nominated	
2025	Directors Guild of America Awards	Outstanding Directorial Achievement in Comedy Series	Hacks – (Episode: "A Slippery Slope")	Nominated	
