= Jen Statsky =

American television writer and comedian

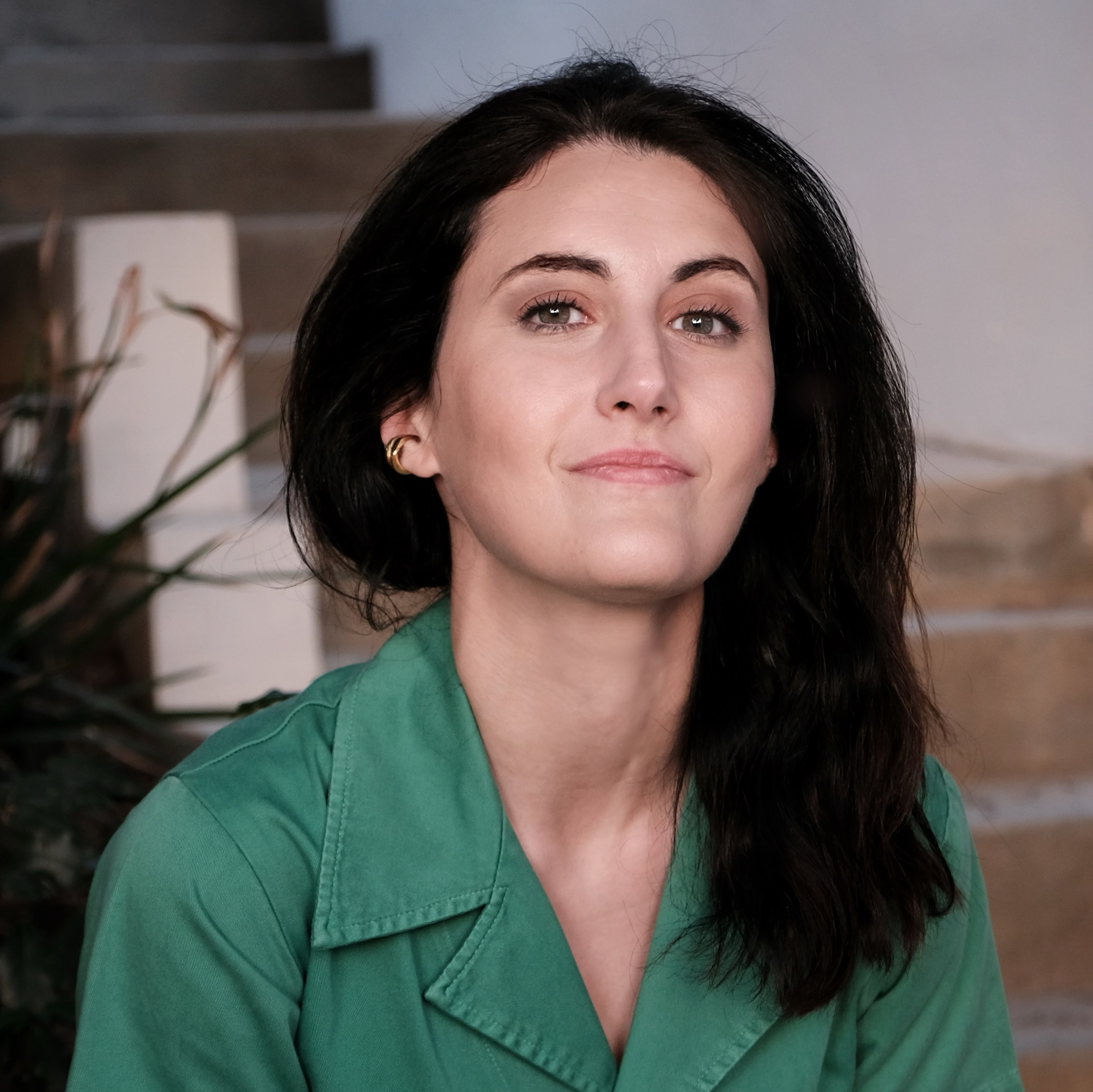
- Born: November 19, 1985 (age 40); Milton, Massachusetts, U.S.
- Occupation: Television writer
- Years active: 2009–present

Jen Statsky (born November 19, 1985) is an American television writer and comedian known for her work on Hacks, The Good Place, Parks and Recreation, and Broad City. She is the co-creator and co-showrunner of the critically-acclaimed HBO Max series Hacks, for which she has received multiple awards including 3 Primetime Emmy Awards, a Peabody Award, and 5 WGA Awards.

== Personal life ==
Jen Statsky was born November 19, 1985, in Milton, Massachusetts, where she grew up before moving to New York City to study at New York University. She attended Tisch School of the Arts where she studied Film and Television. She is a Los Angeles Clippers fan. She is married to Travis Helwig, the Emmy-winning writer formerly at Crooked Media.

== Career ==
=== Early beginnings ===
In school, Statsky developed an interest in writing. When she graduated from NYU in 2008, she was working in a coffee shop as well as performing stand-up comedy. Statsky continued her writing career as an intern for Saturday Night Live, Late Night with Conan O'Brien and The Onion. She joined Twitter in 2009 and used it to write jokes, ultimately gaining a following over time. In 2011, while Statsky continued keeping her Twitter account active, A. D. Miles, the head writer of NBC's Late Night with Jimmy Fallon, messaged her, suggesting Statsky apply to a writing position that was available. She applied for the position and in March 2011 her manager confirmed Statsky was hired as a writer.

=== Television ===
Late Night with Jimmy Fallon was Statsky's first experience as a television writer. She later worked as a staff writer for Hello Ladies and has worked as a writer for Parks and Recreation, Broad City, Lady Dynamite, and The Good Place. In 2019, Statsky joined other WGA writers in firing their agents as part of the WGA's stand against the ATA and the practice of packaging. In 2021, she signed an overall deal with Universal Television.

=== Books ===
Statsky has made a written contribution to the book The McSweeney's Book of Politics and Musicals that was published in 2012. Statsky also wrote a contribution for the book Notes From the Bathroom Line: Humor, Art, and Low-Grade Panic From 150 Of The Funniest Women In Comedy.

== Filmography ==
Year	Title	Credited as		Notes
Year	Title	Writer	Producer	Notes
2011	Onion SportsDome	No	Yes	Associate producer
2011–13	Late Night with Jimmy Fallon	Yes	No	
2013	Hello Ladies	Yes	No	Staff writer
2014–15	Parks and Recreation	Yes	No	Wrote 2 episodes Also story editor and executive story editor
2015–19	Broad City	Yes	Yes	Wrote 4 episodes, also consultant Consulting and co-executive producer
2016	The Characters	Yes	No	Consultant writer, episode: "Paul W. Downs"
2016	Obamtourage	Yes	No	Television short, idea by
2016–17	Lady Dynamite	Yes	No	Wrote 2 episodes Also story editor and executive story editor
2016	Another Period	Yes	No	Wrote: "Tubman"
2018	Forever	Yes	Yes	Supervising producer, story by: "Kase"
2016–2020	The Good Place	Yes	Yes	Wrote 7 episodes Also co-executive, supervising, and co-producer
2020	A Parks and Recreation Special	Yes	No	Television special
2021–2026	Hacks	Yes	Yes	Co-creator with Lucia Aniello and Paul W. Downs; Wrote 14 episodes; directed "QuikScribbl"
2023	Chris Fleming: Hell	No	Yes	Executive producer

== Awards and nominations ==
Year	Award	Category	Nominated work	Result	Ref.
2012	Writers Guild of America Awards	Best Comedy/Variety - (Including Talk) Series - Television	Late Night with Jimmy Fallon	Nominated	
2014	Writers Guild of America Awards	Comedy Series	Parks and Recreation	Nominated	
2016	Writers Guild of America Awards	Comedy Series	Broad City	Nominated	
2019	Producers Guild of America Awards	Outstanding Producer of Episodic Television	The Good Place	Nominated	
2019	Writers Guild of America Awards	Comedy Series	The Good Place	Nominated	
2019	Primetime Emmy Awards	Outstanding Comedy Series	The Good Place (as Supervising Producer)	Nominated	
2020	Primetime Emmy Awards	Outstanding Comedy Series	The Good Place (as Co-Executive Producer)	Nominated	
2021	Primetime Emmy Awards	Outstanding Comedy Series	Hacks (as Executive Producer)	Nominated	
2021	Primetime Emmy Awards	Outstanding Writing for a Comedy Series	Hacks – (Episode: "There Is No Line (Pilot)") (Shared with Lucia Aniello and Paul W. Downs)	Won	
2021	Writers Guild of America Awards	Comedy Series	Hacks	Won	
2021	Writers Guild of America Awards	New Series	Hacks	Won	
2021	Golden Globe Awards	Best Television Series – Musical or Comedy	Hacks (as Executive Producer)	Won	
2021	AFI Awards	Outstanding Television Program of the Year	Hacks	Won	
2021	Peabody Awards	Peabody Award, Entertainment Honoree	Hacks	Won	
2022	Primetime Emmy Awards	Outstanding Comedy Series	Hacks (as Executive Producer)	Nominated	
2022	Primetime Emmy Awards	Outstanding Writing for a Comedy Series	Hacks – (Episode: "The One, The Only") (Shared with Lucia Aniello and Paul W. Downs)	Nominated	
2022	Writers Guild of America Awards	Episodic Comedy	Hacks – (Episode: "The One, The Only") (Shared with Lucia Aniello and Paul W. Downs)	Won	
2022	Writers Guild of America Awards	Comedy Series	Hacks	Nominated	
2022	Producers Guild of America Awards	Outstanding Producer of Episodic Television	Hacks (as Executive Producer)	Nominated	
2022	AFI Awards	Outstanding Television Program of the Year	Hacks	Won	
2024	Primetime Emmy Awards	Outstanding Comedy Series	Hacks (as Executive Producer)	Won	
2024	Primetime Emmy Awards	Outstanding Writing for a Comedy Series	Hacks – (Episode: "Bulletproof") (Shared with Lucia Aniello and Paul W. Downs)	Won	
