= Paul W. Downs =

American actor, writer, and director

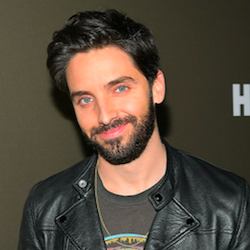
- Downs in 2018
- Born: Paul William Downs; November 21, 1982 (age 43); New Jersey, U.S.
- Education: Duke University
- Occupations: Writer; actor; director
- Years active: 2007–present
- Spouse: Lucia Aniello (m. 2021)
- Children: 1

Paul William Downs (born November 21, 1982) is an American actor, writer, director, and producer. He is the co-creator, co-showrunner and one of the stars of the HBO Max series Hacks, for which he has received two Golden Globes, a Peabody Award, and three Primetime Emmy Awards, among others. Downs first gained attention for his role in the Comedy Central series Broad City, which ran for five seasons and for which he was also a writer, director, and executive producer.

== Early life, family and education ==
Downs was born in Morristown, New Jersey and raised in Sussex Borough, New Jersey. His middle name, William, is taken from his great-grandfather. He attended The Peck School for seventh and eighth grade where he performed in the Twelfth Night and won a drama award. For high school, he attended the Pingry School.

Downs studied theater at Duke University where he performed improv comedy as a member of Duke University Improv (DUI).

== Career ==
Downs has been creating digital shorts with Lucia Aniello under the moniker Paulilu since the pair met at the Upright Citizens Brigade. In 2012, they made a web series called Paulilu Mixtape for Above Average Productions, a division of Broadway Video.

From 2014 to 2019, Downs played Trey Pucker on the Comedy Central sitcom Broad City. Trey is a fitness instructor and the boss turned romantic interest of Abbi Abrams (played by Abbi Jacobson) at Soulstice.

On April 29, 2015, it was confirmed that Downs and Aniello would be writing a female spin-off of 21 Jump Street. On June 22, 2015, the duo sold their script for Move That Body, a feature film acquired by Sony. Retitled Rough Night and released in 2017, Aniello directed, while Downs co-starred opposite Scarlett Johansson in the film.

In 2016 he wrote and starred in his own 30-minute episode of the sketch show Netflix Presents: The Characters. On April 20, 2016, Downs starred in the Comedy Central miniseries Time Traveling Bong alongside Broad City co-star Ilana Glazer.

In 2018, Downs co-starred in Netflix's summer comedy Like Father opposite Kristen Bell, Kelsey Grammer, and Seth Rogen.

Downs was a showrunner and co-star in the HBO Max show Hacks.

In 2021, Downs and Aniello struck a deal with Warner Bros. Television.

On January 31, 2025, Downs appeared on season 17 of RuPaul's Drag Race as a guest judge.

Downs had a cameo role in the eighth episode of The Studio, which premiered on May 6, 2025.

== Personal life ==
He lives in Los Angeles with Lucia Aniello, his wife and comedy partner. After having their wedding delayed for 16 months due to the COVID-19 pandemic, Downs and Aniello got married in September 2021 in an intimate ceremony in Italy. A week later, they shared the news of their marriage at the 73rd Primetime Emmy Awards during Aniello's acceptance speech after winning the award for Outstanding Directing for a Comedy Series. They have a son, born in 2022.

== Awards and nominations ==
Year	Award	Category	Nominated work	Result	Ref.
2021	Primetime Emmy Awards	Outstanding Comedy Series	Hacks (as Executive Producer)	Nominated	
2021	Primetime Emmy Awards	Outstanding Writing for a Comedy Series	Hacks – (Episode: "There Is No Line (Pilot)") (Shared with Lucia Aniello and Jen Statsky)	Won	
2021	Writers Guild of America Awards	Comedy Series	Hacks	Won	
2021	Writers Guild of America Awards	New Series	Hacks	Won	
2021	Golden Globe Awards	Best Television Series – Musical or Comedy	Hacks (as Executive Producer)	Won	
2021	AFI Awards	Outstanding Television Program of the Year	Hacks	Won	
2021	Peabody Awards	Peabody Award, Entertainment Honoree	Hacks	Won	
2022	Primetime Emmy Awards	Outstanding Comedy Series	Hacks (as Executive Producer)	Nominated	
2022	Primetime Emmy Awards	Outstanding Writing for a Comedy Series	Hacks – (Episode: "The One, The Only") (Shared with Lucia Aniello and Jen Statsky)	Nominated	
2022	Writers Guild of America Awards	Episodic Comedy	Hacks – (Episode: "The One, The Only") (Shared with Lucia Aniello and Jen Statsky)	Won	
2022	Writers Guild of America Awards	Comedy Series	Hacks	Nominated	
2022	SAG Awards	Outstanding Performance by an Ensemble in a Comedy Series	Hacks – (Shared with Jean Smart, Hannah Einbinder, Carl Clemons-Hopkins, Mark Indelicato, and Megan Stalter)	Nominated	
2022	Producers Guild of America Awards	Outstanding Producer of Episodic Television	Hacks (as Executive Producer)	Nominated	
2022	AFI Awards	Outstanding Television Program of the Year	Hacks	Won	
2024	Primetime Emmy Awards	Outstanding Comedy Series	Hacks (as Executive Producer)	Won	
2024	Primetime Emmy Awards	Outstanding Writing for a Comedy Series	Hacks – (Episode: "Bulletproof") (Shared with Lucia Aniello and Jen Statsky)	Won	
2024	Primetime Emmy Awards	Outstanding Supporting Actor in a Comedy Series	Hacks	Nominated	
2025	Primetime Emmy Awards	Outstanding Comedy Series	Hacks (as Executive Producer)	Nominated	
2025	Primetime Emmy Awards	Outstanding Writing for a Comedy Series	Hacks – (Episode: "A Slippery Slope") (Shared with Lucia Aniello and Jen Statsky)	Nominated	
2025	Critics' Choice Television Awards	Best Supporting Actor in a Comedy Series	Hacks	Nominated	
2025	Producers Guild of America Awards	Best Episodic Comedy	Hacks	Won	
2025	Writers Guild of America Awards	Comedy Series	Hacks	Won	
2025	Writers Guild of America Awards	Episodic Comedy	Hacks – (Episode: "Bulletproof") (Shared with Lucia Aniello and Jen Statsky)	Won	
2026	Critics' Choice Television Awards	Best Supporting Actor in a Comedy Series	Hacks	Nominated	
2026	Producers Guild of America Awards	Best Episodic Comedy	Hacks	Nominated	
2026	Writers Guild of America Awards	Comedy Series	Hacks	Nominated	
2026	Primetime Emmy Awards	Outstanding Comedy Series	Hacks (as Executive Producer)	Nominated	
2026	Primetime Emmy Awards	Outstanding Supporting Actor in a Comedy Series	Hacks	Nominated	
2026	Primetime Emmy Awards	Outstanding Writing for a Comedy Series	Hacks – (Episode: "Hacks (Finale)") (Shared with Lucia Aniello and Jen Statsky)	Nominated	
