= List of awards and nominations received by Jean Smart =

Jean Smart awards and nominations
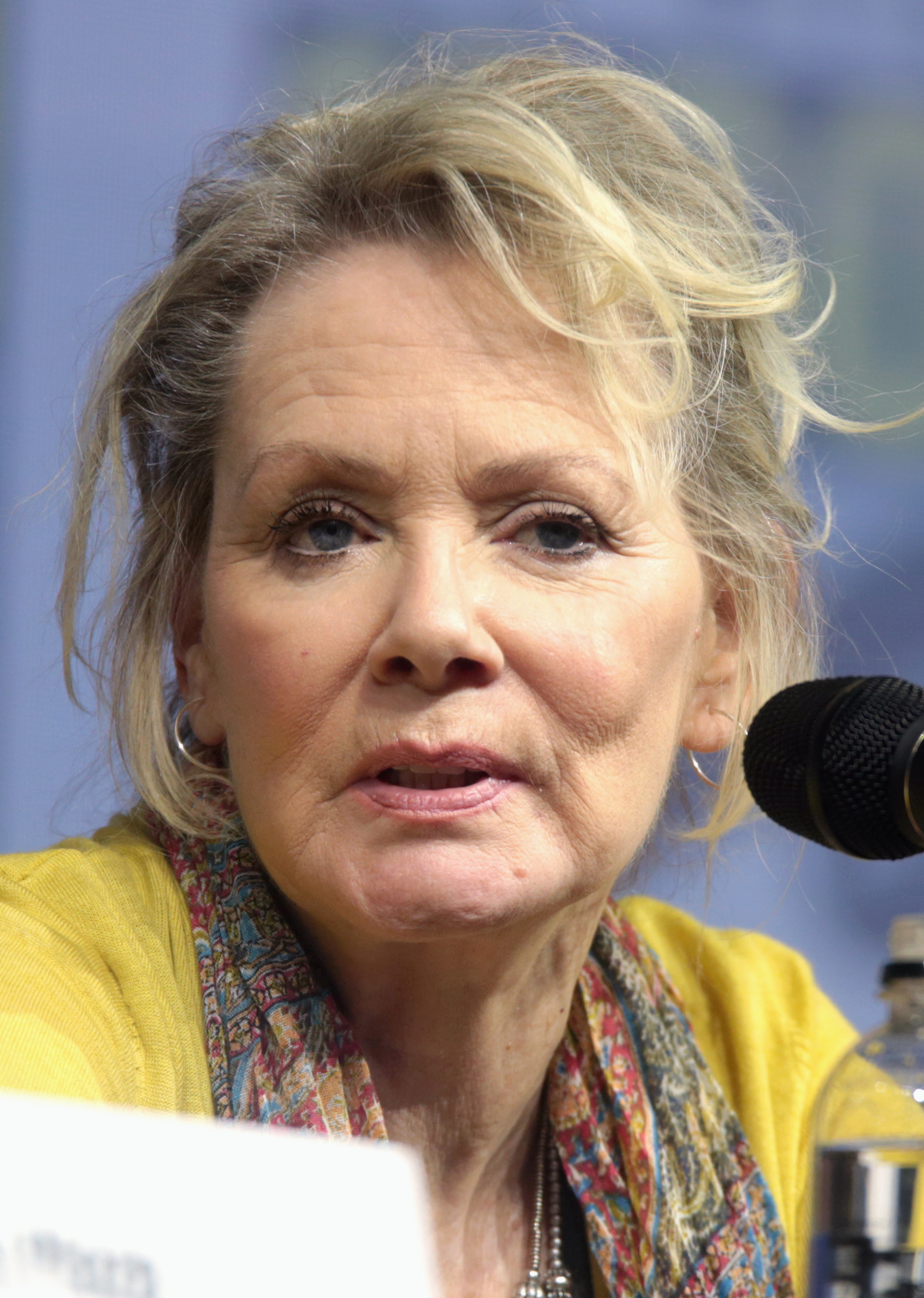
- Smart at the 2018 San Diego Comic-Con
Awards and nominations
Award	Wins	Nominations
Emmy Awards	8	15
Golden Globes	3	4
Grammy Awards	0	1
SAG Awards	3	11
Tony Awards	0	1

Totals (Note: Certain award groups do not simply award one winner. They acknowledge several different recipients, have runners-up, and have third place. Since this is a specific recognition and is different from losing an award, runner-up mentions are considered wins in this award tally. For simplification and to avoid errors, each award in this list has been presumed to have had a prior nomination.)
- Wins: 35
- Nominations: 31

Jean Smart is an American actress known for her roles on stage and screen. She has received eight Primetime Emmy Awards, three Golden Globe Awards, and three Screen Actors Guild Awards as well as nominations for a Grammy Award and a Tony Award.

Smart has received 15 Primetime Emmy Award nominations for her diverse work on television. She won two consecutive awards for Outstanding Guest Actress in a Comedy Series for her recurring role as Lana Gardner, a former classmate and love interest of Frasier Crane on the NBC sitcom Frasier in 2000 and 2001. She won Outstanding Supporting Actress in a Comedy Series playing a dysfunctional mother in the ABC sitcom Samantha Who? (2008).

She won five Outstanding Lead Actress in a Comedy Series Emmy awards for her role as stand-up comedienne Deborah Vance in the HBO Max comedy series Hacks (2021, 2022, 2024, 2025, 2026). She set a record in being the only woman to win an Emmy for every season of a TV series. The role also earned her two Golden Globe Awards for Best Actress – Television Series Musical or Comedy and three Screens Actors Guild Awards for Outstanding Performance by a Female Actor in a Comedy Series.

Smart was also Emmy-nominated for her diverse roles as Detective Sherry Regan in the CBS crime drama The District in 2001, Martha Logan in the Fox action drama series 24 in 2006–2007, Roseanna Remmick, a ruthless District Attorney in the NBC legal comedy-drama series Harry's Law in 2012, Floyd Gerhardt in the FX anthology crime series Fargo in 2016, Laurie Blake in the HBO superhero limited series Watchmen in 2020, and Helen Fahey, the mother of a police detective in the HBO crime drama miniseries Mare of Easttown in 2021.

On film, she earned an Independent Spirit Award for Best Supporting Female nomination for her performance as a concerned mother in the drama film Guinevere (2000). She played a gossip columnist in Damien Chazelle's Hollywood epic Babylon (2022) and was nominated for the Screen Actors Guild Award for Outstanding Performance by a Cast in a Motion Picture at the 29th Screen Actors Guild Awards.

On stage, she was also nominated for the Tony Award for Best Actress in a Play for her performance as Lorraine Sheldon in the Broadway revival of the George S. Kaufman and Moss Hart play The Man Who Came to Dinner (2001).

== Major associations ==
=== Emmy Awards ===
Year	Category	Nominated work	Result	Ref.
Primetime Emmy Awards
2000	Outstanding Guest Actress in a Comedy Series	Frasier (season 7)	Won	
2001	Outstanding Guest Actress in a Comedy Series	Frasier (season 8)	Won	
2001	Outstanding Guest Actress in a Drama Series	The District	Nominated	
2006	Outstanding Supporting Actress in a Drama Series	24	Nominated	
2007	Outstanding Guest Actress in a Drama Series	24	Nominated	
2008	Outstanding Supporting Actress in a Comedy Series	Samantha Who? (episode: "The Girlfriend")	Won	
2012	Outstanding Guest Actress in a Drama Series	Harry's Law (episode: "The Rematch")	Nominated	
2016	Outstanding Supporting Actress in a Limited Series or Movie	Fargo (season 2)	Nominated	
2020	Outstanding Supporting Actress in a Limited Series or Movie	Watchmen	Nominated	
2021	Outstanding Supporting Actress in a Limited Series or Movie	Mare of Easttown	Nominated	
2021	Outstanding Lead Actress in a Comedy Series	Hacks (episode: "1.69 Million")	Won	
2022	Outstanding Lead Actress in a Comedy Series	Hacks (episode: "The Click")	Won	
2024	Outstanding Lead Actress in a Comedy Series	Hacks (episode: "Yes, And")	Won	
2025	Outstanding Lead Actress in a Comedy Series	Hacks (episode: "I Love L.A.")	Won	
2026	Outstanding Lead Actress in a Comedy Series	Hacks (episode: "Hacks")	Won	

=== Golden Globe Awards ===
Year	Category	Nominated work	Result	Ref.
2022	Best Actress – Television Series Musical or Comedy	Hacks (season 1)	Won	
2023	Best Actress – Television Series Musical or Comedy	Hacks (season 2)	Nominated	
2025	Best Actress – Television Series Musical or Comedy	Hacks (season 3)	Won	
2026	Best Actress – Television Series Musical or Comedy	Hacks (season 4)	Won	

=== Grammy Awards ===
Year	Category	Nominated work	Result	Ref.
2016	Best Spoken Word Album	Patience and Sarah	Nominated	

=== Screen Actors Guild Award ===
Year	Category	Nominated work	Result	Ref.
2007	Outstanding Ensemble in a Drama Series	24 (season 5)	Nominated	
2022	Outstanding Female Actor in a Limited Series or Television Movie	Mare of Easttown	Nominated	
2022	Outstanding Female Actor in a Comedy Series	Hacks (season 1)	Won	
2022	Outstanding Ensemble in a Comedy Series	Hacks (season 1)	Nominated	
2023	Outstanding Cast in a Motion Picture	Babylon	Nominated	
2023	Outstanding Female Actor in a Comedy Series	Hacks (season 2)	Won	
2023	Outstanding Ensemble in a Comedy Series	Hacks (season 2)	Nominated	
2025	Outstanding Female Actor in a Comedy Series	Hacks (season 3)	Won	
2025	Outstanding Ensemble in a Comedy Series	Hacks (season 3)	Nominated	
2026	Outstanding Female Actor in a Comedy Series	Hacks (season 4)	Nominated	
2026	Outstanding Ensemble in a Comedy Series	Hacks (season 4)	Nominated	

=== Tony Awards ===
Year	Category	Nominated work	Result	Ref.
2001	Best Actress in a Play	The Man Who Came to Dinner	Nominated	

== Miscellaneous awards ==
Organizations	Year	Category	Work	Result	Ref.
AACTA International Awards	2022	Best Actress in a Series	Hacks	Nominated	
AACTA International Awards	2023	Best Actress in a Series	Hacks	Nominated	
AACTA International Awards	2023	Best Supporting Actress	Babylon	Nominated	
AACTA International Awards	2025	Best Actress in a Series	Hacks	Nominated	
AACTA International Awards	2026	Best Actress in a Series	Hacks	Nominated	
AARP Movies for Grownups Awards	2022	Best Actress (TV/Streaming)	Hacks	Won	
AARP Movies for Grownups Awards	2025	Best Actress (TV/Streaming)	Hacks	Nominated	
AARP Movies for Grownups Awards	2026	Best Actress (TV/Streaming)	Hacks	Nominated	
American Comedy Awards	2001	Funniest Female Guest Appearance in a TV Series	Frasier	Nominated	
Astra TV Awards	2021	Best Actress in a Streaming Series, Comedy	Hacks	Won	
Astra TV Awards	2021	Best Supporting Actress in a Limited Series or Movie	Mare of Easttown	Nominated	
Astra TV Awards	2022	Best Actress in a Streaming Series, Comedy	Hacks	Nominated	
Astra TV Awards	2024	Best Actress in a Streaming Series, Comedy	Hacks	Won	
Astra TV Awards	2025	Best Actress in a Comedy Series	Hacks	Nominated	
Astra TV Awards	2025	Best Cast Ensemble in a Streaming Comedy Series	Hacks	Nominated	
Astra TV Awards	2026	Best Actress in a Comedy Series	Hacks	Won	
Astra TV Awards	2026	Best Streaming Comedy Ensemble	Hacks	Nominated	
Dorian TV Awards	2020	Best Supporting TV Performance - Actress	Watchmen	Nominated	
Dorian TV Awards	2021	Best TV Performance	Hacks	Won	
Dorian TV Awards	2021	Best Supporting TV Performance	Mare of Easttown	Nominated	
Dorian TV Awards	2022	Best TV Performance	Hacks	Nominated	
Dorian TV Awards	2022	Best TV Musical Performance	Hacks (for "(You Make Me Feel Like) A Natural Woman")	Nominated	
Dorian TV Awards	2024	Best TV Performance - Comedy	Hacks	Won	
Dorian TV Awards	2025	GALECA TV Icon Award	—N/a	Won	
Dorian TV Awards	2025	Best TV Performance - Comedy	Hacks	Won	
Dorian TV Awards	2026	Best TV Performance - Comedy	Hacks	Won	
Gotham Awards	2021	Outstanding Performance in a New Series	Hacks	Nominated	
Independent Spirit Awards	2000	Best Supporting Female	Guinevere	Nominated	
Satellite Awards	2006	Best Supporting Actress – Television	24	Nominated	
Satellite Awards	2022	Best Actress – Television Series Musical or Comedy	Hacks	Won	
Satellite Awards	2022	Best Supporting Actress – Television	Mare of Easttown	Nominated	
Satellite Awards	2023	Best Actress – Television Series Musical or Comedy	Hacks	Nominated	
Satellite Awards	2023	Best Actress in a Supporting Role	Babylon	Nominated	
Satellite Awards	2025	Best Actress – Television Series Musical or Comedy	Hacks	Nominated	
Satellite Awards	2026	Best Actress – Television Series Musical or Comedy	Hacks	Nominated	

== Theater awards ==
Organizations	Year	Category	Work	Result	Ref.
Drama Desk Award	1981	Outstanding Featured Actress in a Play	Last Summer at Bluefish Cove	Nominated	
Outer Critics Circle Award	2026	Outstanding Solo Performance	Call Me Izzy	Nominated	

== Critics awards ==
Organizations	Year	Category	Work	Result	Ref.
Critics' Choice Awards	2016	Best Supporting Actress in a Movie/Miniseries	Fargo	Won	
Critics' Choice Awards	2020	Best Supporting Actress in a Drama Series	Watchmen	Won	
Critics' Choice Awards	2022	Best Actress in a Comedy Series	Hacks	Won	
Critics' Choice Awards	2022	Best Supporting Actress in a Movie/Miniseries	Mare of Easttown	Nominated	
Critics' Choice Awards	2023	Best Actress in a Comedy Series	Hacks	Won	
Critics' Choice Awards	2025	Best Actress in a Comedy Series	Hacks	Won	
Critics' Choice Awards	2026	Best Actress in a Comedy Series	Hacks	Won	
Television Critics Association Awards	2021	Career Achievement Award	—N/a	Won	
Television Critics Association Awards	2021	Individual Achievement in Comedy	Hacks	Won	
Television Critics Association Awards	2022	Individual Achievement in Comedy	Hacks	Nominated	
Television Critics Association Awards	2024	Individual Achievement in Comedy	Hacks	Won	
Television Critics Association Awards	2025	Individual Achievement in Comedy	Hacks	Nominated	
Television Critics Association Awards	2026	Individual Achievement in Comedy	Hacks	Nominated	

== Honorary awards ==
Organizations	Year	Category	Work	Result	Ref.
Hollywood Walk of Fame	2022	Television	—N/a	Honored	
Television Hall of Fame	2026	Inductee	—N/a	Honored	
