= List of fictional towns in film =

This is a list of fictional towns and villages in film limited to notable examples.

Town Name	Film name(s)	Distributor(s)	Notes
Agrabah	Aladdin	Walt Disney Pictures	An Arabian city, where Aladdin, Princess Jasmine, Genie, Abu, Jafar and Iago reside. It has a marketplace and the iconic palace where the Sultan, Jasmine and Rajah live. It also has a parade where lots of people come to watch the elephants, people dancing and a marching band too.
Ambrose, Louisiana	House of Wax	Warner Bros. and Village Roadshow Pictures and Dark Castle Entertainment	Ambrose is a town whose population consists mostly of wax figures.
Amity Island	Jaws	Universal Pictures	The main setting of the film, located in New York on the beach
Antonio Bay, California	The Fog	AVCO Embassy Pictures	
Antonio Island, Oregon	The Fog	Columbia Pictures	
Alphaville	Alphaville	Athos Films	Alphaville is a dystopian city where secret agent (posing as a journalist) Lemmy Caution arrives on a mission to first find out what happened to his precursor and then, how to destroy the computer Alpha 60 as it controls the whole city.
Asteroid City	Asteroid City	American Empirical Pictures	Asteroid City is a desert town.
Atlantica	The Little Mermaid	Walt Disney Pictures	An underwater city where Ariel, King Triton and her mermaid siblings live. It is located in Denmark. It is also the hometown of Melody, Ariel and Prince Eric's daughter.
Autobot City	The Transformers: The Movie	Sunbow Productions, Marvel Productions, Toei Animation, and De Laurentiis Entertainment Group	
Belleville, U.S.	The Triplets of Belleville	Les Armateurs and Champion and Vivi Film and France 3 Cinéma and RGP France and BBC Bristol and BBC Worldwide	Belleville is a city in the United States which is based on New York City.
Bailey Downs, Ontario, Canada	Ginger Snaps (film)	Motion International	
Bedford Falls, New York	It's a Wonderful Life	RKO Radio Pictures	
Brahms, West Virginia	Silent Hill	Silent Hill DCP Inc., Davis Films, Konami	Brahms is a town in Toluca County, West Virginia.
Brigadoon	Brigadoon	MGM	A miraculously blessed village that rises out of the mists every hundred years for only a day. This is based on a Broadway musical of the same name.
Brightburn, Kansas	Brightburn	Sony Pictures Releasing	Brightburn is a town in Kansas the main setting of Brightburn.
Bismuth, U.S.	Brimstone	N279 Entertainment and X-Filme and Backup Media and Filmwave and Prime Time and The Jokers Films	Bismuth is a former-mining town in the Wild West.
Bristo Camino, California	Hostage	Miramax Films	Located in Ventura County, California; based on Ojai and Moorpark.
Castle Rock, Oregon	Stand by Me	Columbia Pictures	
Catsville	Cat City	Mokép	
Chesterford, Massachusetts	211	Momentum Pictures	A fictional town in New England. Its zip code is 02452, placing it in Middlesex County, Massachusetts.
Cloud City	The Empire Strikes Back	20th Century-Fox	
Colverdale, Massachusetts	Deck the Halls	20th Century Fox	
Creek Falls	Art of Falling in Love	Brain Power Studio	The entire love story takes place in this town.
Crystal Lake, New Jersey	Friday the 13th	Paramount Pictures	A city where Camp Crystal Lake is located.
Damon, Washington	Short Circuit (1986 film)	Tri-Star Pictures	The small town in Washington State where NOVA Laboratories that built Johnny 5 is located.
Dammuz, Middle East	Gambit (1966 film)	Universal Pictures	City in unrevealed Middle East country, most of it belongs to Ahmad Shahbandar, the richest man in the world.
Deer Meadow, Washington	Twin Peaks: Fire Walk With Me	New Line Cinema	A small town in Washington State. In 1988, a body of a teenage girl, Teresa Banks is found in the river, and two FBI agents are sent to investigate the case. Deer Meadow seems to be not so far from Twin Peaks, Washington, the main place in the series (both the 1990 series and 2017 continuation) and the film.
Dillford, Ohio	Freaks of Nature	Columbia Pictures, LStar Capital and Sony Pictures Releasing	Located in the state of Ohio, Dillford is a city known for its population being composed of three different species: humans, zombies and vampires, who initially hate each other, but end up coming together when aliens invade the city and all end up having to face the invaders together.
Dinsford, England	One Hundred and One Dalmatians	Walt Disney Pictures	
Dodson, Mississippi	This Property Is Condemned	Paramount Pictures	Fictional small Southern town in decline during the 1930s; the primary setting of the romance between Alva Starr and Owen Legate
Dogville, Colorado	Dogville	Zentropa Entertainment and Isabella Films B.V. and Something Else B.V. and Memfis Film	Dogville is a small town located in Rocky Mountains.
Duloc	Shrek	DreamWorks Pictures	Duloc is a city-state.
Ebbing, Missouri	Three Billboards Outside Ebbing, Missouri	Fox Searchlight Pictures and 20th Century Studios and Netflix	
Emerald City	The Wizard of Oz	MGM	The Emerald City is the capital city of the Land of Oz based on L. Frank Baum's Oz books, first described in The Wonderful Wizard of Oz. The city is sometimes called the City of Emeralds due to its extensively green architecture.
Emslie, Ontario	The Boys Club	Alliance Communications Corporation	A fictional town in Ontario, Canada.
Flagstone, Arizona	Once Upon a Time in the West	Paramount Pictures	
Fly Creek, Georgia	Squirm	American International Pictures	A small rural town attacked by worms.
Fryburg, California	My Blue Heaven	Warner Bros.	A town "in the middle of nowhere", where the FBI has relocated a number of mobsters in the Witness Protection Program
Greenbow, Alabama	Forrest Gump	Paramount Pictures	Greenbow, Alabama is a fictional town in Greenbow County which is fictional as well.
Green Hills, Montana	Sonic the Hedgehog	Paramount Pictures	The town in which both Sonic and Tom Wachowski live. The name is a reference to the iconic Sonic the Hedgehog level Green Hill Zone.
Groom Lake City	Traumschiff Surprise – Periode 1		A Frontier city at the location of the later United States Air Force facility Area 51
Grouchland	The Adventures of Elmo in Grouchland	Columbia Pictures	The main location of the film based on the Sesame Street franchise. Elmo goes to that location where grouches live there, including Grizzy, the founder. The park can be seen in the song Take the First Step where Stuckweed and some woodland creatures sing for Elmo about taking your very first step as a child. When Elmo gets woken up by the Alarm Clock Bird at the beginning of the film, he realizes that he lost his blanket after his friendship with it and has to go to Grouchland to find it. The main location can be seen inside Oscar’s trash can in Sesame Street
Haddonfield, Illinois	Halloween franchise	Compass International Pictures and Falcon International Productions	Haddonfield is the main setting of the Halloween franchise. The town located in Livingston County, Illinois.
Harper, Connecticut	The Stranger	International Pictures	
Hilltop, USA	Wrongfully Accused	Morgan Creek Productions and Constantin Film	
Hill Valley, California	Back to the Future, Back to the Future Part II, and Back to the Future Part III	Universal	Hill Valley, California, is a town that serves as the setting of the Back to the Future trilogy and its animated spin-off series. In the trilogy, Hill Valley is seen in four different time periods (1885, 1955, 1985 and 2015) as well as in a dystopian alternate 1985. The films contain many sight gags, verbal innuendos and detailed set design elements, from which a detailed and consistent history of the area can be derived. The name "Hill Valley" is itself a joke, being an oxymoron. However, an early script for Back to the Future Part II mentioned that Hill Valley was named after its founder, William "Bill" Hill.
Hope, Washington	First Blood	Orion Pictures	
Hope Town	Hobo with a Shotgun	Alliance Films	An extremely corrupt and amoral town implied to be located somewhere within the United States–Canada border.
Inferno, California	Inferno	Columbia TriStar Home Video	Inferno is a desert town.
Ivory Creek, Georgia	American Adventure	Rolling Ball Films	Small town located in Morris County, Georgia, shortly served as the backdrop of protagonist, Nathan Grey. Little information is known about the town, apart from its reputation of being the headquarters of the KKK affiliated with the Frontier Heritage Church.
Jonathanland	Madison Park	Mason Ewing Corporation	Created by Mason Ewing, Jonathanland is the city where Baby Madison lives.
Karatas, Kazakhstan	Goliath; Assault; Ulbolsyn; A Dark, Dark Man; Plague at the Karatas Village	Various	A fictional village (aul) in Kazakhstan that is used as a setting in numerous Adilkhan Yerzhanov's films. In A Dark, Dark Man, according to the license plates, the village is located in the Almaty Region.
Khansaar, India	Salaar: Part 1 – Ceasefire	Hombale Films	An autonomous dystopian city-state in India ruled by three tribes.
Kotha, India	King of Kotha	Wayfarer Films and Zee Studios	A fictional town called Kotha, which is situated near the Kerala-Tamil Nadu border
Lillian, Ohio	Super 8	Paramount Pictures	A town in Ohio, where local children find an alien while filming their movie, and where people start experiencing problems with electricity, as well as strange disappearances of some people and electronic items.
Loganville, Maryland	Senior Year	Netflix	
Madison, Delaware	Goosebumps	Columbia Pictures	
Mantua	Romeo + Juliet	20th Century Fox	Mantua is a desert trailer park. It based on Mantua.
Maycomb, Alabama	To Kill a Mockingbird	Universal-International Pictures	Fictional Depression-era Alabama town where Atticus Finch defends Tom Robinson in a racially charged trial. Adapted from Harper Lee's 1960 Pulitzer Prize–winning novel To Kill a Mockingbird
Mega City	The Matrix	Warner Brothers	Mega City is the sprawling, virtual city in which Neo lives to begin the film franchise.
Mega-City One	Judge Dredd	Various	Mega City 1 is an enormous megacity in which the inhabitants of the Judge Dredd universe live. The city is a conglomeration of many cities, fused into one large city with a gigantic downtown and an impressive skyline. It stretches most of the length of the US East coast.
Metropolis	Metropolis	Parufamet	Megacity with a wide gap between rich and poor
Metroville, California	The Incredibles	Walt Disney Pictures and Pixar Animation Studios	
Middleton, USA	11:14	Firm Films and Media 8 Entertainment	Middleton is a town. The population is 14,483.
Midlothia, USA	Midlothia	Intentional Films	
Middlesex, Virginia	Donnie Darko	Pandora Cinema, Newmarket Films	
Millbrook, New York	A Quiet Place 2	Paramount Pictures	Small town in upstate New York.
Mill Valley, Pennsylvania	Scary Stories to Tell in the Dark	Lionsgate	
Miles County, New York	Terrifier franchise	Cineverse, Bloody Disgusting, Dark Age Cinema	Main setting in the Terrifier franchise of movies and it is a town where a notorious urban legend killer Art the Clown lived. Filming location takes place within Staten Island, New York
Moesko Island, Washington	The Ring	DreamWorks Pictures	
Monstropolis	Monsters, Inc.	Disney/Pixar	The town where the titular Monsters, Inc. is located and Mike and Sulley's hometown
Mos Eisley	Star Wars	20th Century-Fox	Mos Eisley is a spaceport on the planet Tatooine in the Star Wars universe. Described as a "hive of scum and villainy".
Mos Espa	Star Wars: Episode I – The Phantom Menace	20th Century-Fox	Mos Espa is a spaceport on the Northern hemisphere of the planet Tatooine in the Star Wars universe. It is the former home of Anakin Skywalker and the venue of a pod race
Mt. Abraham, New York	Final Destination	New Line Cinema	Mount Abraham, New York is a fictional town located in the U.S. state of New York. Final Destination is set in Mt. Abraham.
Newton Haven, UK	The World's End	Universal Pictures and Focus Features	
New Holland	Frankenweenie	Walt Disney Pictures and Tim Burton Productions	A quiet town located somewhere within the U.S. The town was rumored to be built above an abandoned gold mine among other things, based on its name. The town is heavily influenced by Dutch Culture, A notable landmark of the town includes a large windmill overlooking the town, as well as a yearly festival called Dutch Day, further cementing the town's Dutch roots.
Nickeltown, Tennessee	Silent Hill	Silent Hill DCP Inc. and Davis Films and Konami	
Nilbog	Troll 2	Epic Productions	
Oak Ridge	Acceptable Risks	1986 ABC made-for television movie	Oak Ridge is a small American town with a major chemical plant. The plant manager has financial pressure from HQ in Chicago. Shortages and other factors lead to an accident that kills hundreds of people in the town.
Ogden Marsh, Iowa	The Crazies	Overture Films	Ogden Marsh is a small Iowa town with a population of 1,260 people, not so far from Cedar Rapids, Iowa. A military plane, that was carrying the samples of a Rhabdovirus called "Trixie", has crashed in the Hopman Bog, contaminating the town's water supply and infecting its citizens, causing them to turn into homicidal killers. Presumably all the population of Ogden Marsh was destroyed by the military, both infected and non-infected; at the end of the film, Ogden Marsh is destroyed by a nuclear explosion, carried out by the military to contain the virus and the truth about it.
Old Stump, Arizona	A Million Ways to Die in the West	Universal Pictures	
Peacock, Nebraska	Peacock	Cornfield Productions and Mandate Pictures	
Perfection, Nevada	Tremors (franchise)	Universal Pictures	Perfection is a town the population is 14.
Pigeon Creek, Alabama	Sweet Home Alabama	Walt Disney Studios Motion Pictures	Pigeon Creek stereotypical southern town
Pleasantville	Pleasantville	Warner Bros.	Pleasantville is a black and white 1950s town that is the setting of the in-movie television sitcom Pleasantville.
Pokyo	Cat City	Mokép	Pokyo is a city which is based on Tokyo.
Porto Corsa	Cars 2	Walt Disney Pictures and Pixar	Porto Corsa is a city on the Italian Riviera, Italy, where Francesco Bernoulli has grown up, and is also the location of the second race of the World Grand Prix (Italian: Mondiale Grand Prix).
Portoroso	Luca	Walt Disney Pictures and Pixar	The city of Italy that was based on the seaside towns in the Italian Riviera and the main setting of the film.
Pozharnov, Russia	DC Extended Universe	Warner Bros. Studios	Located near Moscow, Pozharnov is a ghost city that has suffered from a nuclear disaster similar to the Chernobyl disaster.
Pribrezhny, Russia	Leviathan	A Company Russia	Pribrezhny is a town in Northern Russia, located on the coast of a small bay where whales can sometimes be seen.
Raccoon City	Resident Evil	Screen Gems	Raccoon City is a small, industrialized city located in the Midwestern United States. It was home to the Umbrella corporation, and main character of the film series, Alice. As in the video game series, it is the birthplace of the infection that eventually consumes the city. Raccoon city is destroyed in the second installment of the films.
Radiator Springs	Cars	Walt Disney Pictures, Pixar	Radiator Springs is a composite of multiple places in various states on U.S. Route 66. In Cars (film) its geographic position (as displayed on a map during a flashback) resembles that of Peach Springs, Arizona.
Ratropolis, England	Flushed Away	DreamWorks Animation, Aardman Animations	Ratropolis is a city in the sewers of London. It is based on the city.
Redemption, USA	The Quick and the Dead	Sony Pictures Releasing	
Red Hill, USA	Red Hill	Sony Pictures Releasing International	
Rockbridge, California	Christine	Columbia Pictures	
Rock Ridge	Blazing Saddles	Warner Bros. Pictures	
Rock Vegas	The Flintstones in Viva Rock Vegas	Universal Pictures	Rock Vegas is a city in the Stone Age. The city is based on Las Vegas.
San Angeles, California	Demolition Man	Warner Bros.	San Angeles is a utopian agglomeration that was created by merging San Diego, Los Angeles and Santa Barbara.
San Miguel Arcángel, Mexico	Hell	Bandidos Films	This Mexican city is the main setting of the 2010 film Hell and this city is notoriously known for its drug trafficking.
Sandford, UK	Hot Fuzz	Universal Pictures and Rogue Pictures	
Santa Mira, California	Invasion of the Body Snatchers	Allied Artists Pictures	Fictional California town where an extraterrestrial invasion that begins
Santa Cecilia, Mexico	Cars 3 and Coco	Walt Disney Pictures and Pixar	This Mexican city was inspired by Oaxaca City, Oaxaca, Mexico and first appeared in Cars 3 as the birthplace of Gabriel, one of the secondary characters of this movie. It is also the main setting of the 2017 film Coco.
Seabrook	Zombies	Disney Channel	The main setting of the movie franchise; has a strict law where everything must be alike and perfect, and anything different is unacceptable.
Sexville	Sexville	IFG	Sexville is a town. The population is 169.
Shermer, Illinois	The Breakfast Club, Weird Science	Universal Pictures, A&M Films, Channel Productions	John Hughes stated that many of his films all took place within the same fictional Illinois town of Shermer. The Breakfast Club and Weird Science both make explicit reference to the town by name.
Silent Hill, West Virginia	Silent Hill	Silent Hill DCP Inc., Davis Films, Konami	Silent Hill is a town in Toluca County, West Virginia.
Silver Creek, Colorado	Misery	MGM, Castle Rock Entertainment	
Smalltown	The Muppets	Disney	The town where Gary, Mary and Walter live.
Springwood, Ohio	A Nightmare on Elm Street	New Line Cinema	
Suburbicon	Suburbicon	Paramount Pictures	
Sweetwater, Arizona	Once Upon a Time in the West	Paramount Pictures	
Sylvane, Illinois	Silent Hill	Silent Hill DCP Inc. and Davis Films and Konami	
Tenderville, Oregon	Rampage	Event Film Distribution	Located in (also fictional) Mallet County, Oregon.
Theed	Star Wars: Episode I – The Phantom Menace	20th Century-Fox	Theed is the capital city of the planet Naboo and its seat of government.
Tipoca City	Star Wars: Episode II – Attack of the Clones	20th Century-Fox	Tipoca City is the capital city of the watery planet Kamino and the location of the Kaminoan cloning facilities.
Twin Peaks, Washington	Twin Peaks: Fire Walk with Me	New Line Cinema	Twin Peaks, Washington, is the town in David Lynch's 1992 film, a prequel to the television serial drama of the same title.
Two-Bit, California	The Good, the Bad, and Huckleberry Hound	Hanna-Barbera Productions	A small desert town in California Gold Rush era where Huckleberry Hound is unexpectedly appointed as its sheriff to defend against the Dalton Gang.
Verona Beach	Romeo + Juliet	20th Century Fox	Verona Beach is the main setting of the film. It's based on Verona.
Victory, California	Don't Worry Darling	Warner Bros. Pictures	
Waaji City	Saaho	T-Series	A fictional city ruled by gangsters, inspired by Abu Dhabi and Mumbai.
Wardenclyffe, New York	Goosebumps 2: Haunted Halloween	Columbia Pictures	A fictional city in New York. It was named after the Wardenclyffe Tower in Shoreham, New York.
Warren Valley, Ohio	Trick 'r Treat	Warner Bros. Pictures	
Westview	WandaVision	Walt Disney Pictures and Marvel	Westview is based on the town of Leonia, New Jersey and the main place of the entire series.
Woodsboro, California	Scream, Scream 4, Scream (2022)	Dimension Films	
Woop Woop, Australia	Welcome to Woop Woop	Film Finance Corporation Australia	
Zion	The Matrix	Warner Brothers	Zion is a city in The Matrix films. It is the last human city on Earth after a cataclysmic nuclear war between humankind and sentient machines, which resulted in artificial lifeforms dominating the world.
