= Eboch =

Eboch is a surname. Notable people with the surname include:

- Chris Eboch, American children's book author
- Douglas J. Eboch (born 1967), American screenwriter, author, and educator
