= Jean Smart filmography =

Acting credits of American actress born 1951

Jean Smart is an American actress. She is known for her diverse roles in comedies and dramas on stage and screen. She gained notoriety for her role as Charlene Frazier-Stillfield in the CBS sitcom Designing Women (1986–1991). She had a recurring guest role as Lana Gardner, a romantic interest in the NBC sitcom Frasier from 2000 to 2001 earning two Primetime Emmy Awards for Outstanding Guest Actress in a Comedy Series.

She expanded her work in television often shifting from comedy and drama taking roles such as Detective Sherry Regan in the CBS crime drama series The District (2000–2004), Martha Logan in the Fox action drama series 24 (2006–2007), Regina Newly in the ABC sitcom Samantha Who? (2007–2009), Roseanna Remmick, a District Attorney in the NBC legal comedy Harry's Law (2011–2012), Floyd Gerhardt in the FX anthology series Fargo (2015), Melanie Bird in the FX superhero series Legion (2017–2019), and Agent Laurie Blake in the HBO limited series Watchmen (2019), and Helen Fahey in the HBO miniseries Mare of Easttown (2021). She gained acclaim and five Primetime Emmy Awards for Outstanding Lead Actress in a Comedy Series for playing comedian Deborah Vance in the HBO Max comedy series Hacks (2021–2026).

On film, she took early roles in the action thriller Flashpoint (1984), the romance drama Fire with Fire (1986), and the science fiction comedy Project X (1987). She took supporting roles in the satirical comedy film The Brady Bunch Movie (1995), the romantic comedy Sweet Home Alabama (2002), the comedy Bringing Down the House (2003), the independent dramedy Garden State (2004), the independent film I Heart Huckabees (2004), the romance Youth in Revolt (2009), the dramedy Hope Springs (2012), the action thriller The Accountant (2016), and the black comedy mystery A Simple Favor (2018). She played a gossip columnist in the Damien Chazelle historical epic Babylon (2022).

On stage, Smart made her Broadway debut playing Marlene Dietrich in the Pam Gems play Piaf (1981). She acted in the Broadway revival of the Moss Hart and George S. Kaufman play The Man Who Came to Dinner (2003) for which she was nominated for the Tony Award for Best Actress in a Play. In 2025, she returned to Broadway in the one-woman play Call Me Izzy (2025).

== Film ==
Year	Title	Role	Notes
1980	Hoodlums	Carol	
1984	Flashpoint	Doris	
1984	Protocol	Ella	
1986	Fire with Fire	Sister Marie	
1987	Project X	Dr. Criswell	
1992	Baby Talk	Narrator	
1992	Mistress	Patricia Riley	
1993	Homeward Bound: The Incredible Journey	Kate	
1994	The Yearling	Ora Baxter	
1995	The Brady Bunch Movie	Dena Dittmeyer	
1995	Whisper of the Heart	Asako Tsukishima	
1996	Edie and Pen	Wendy the Waitress	
1998	The Odd Couple II	Holly	
1999	Guinevere	Deborah Sloane	
2000	Forever Fabulous	Loreli Daly	
2000	Snow Day	Laura Brandston	
2000	Disney's The Kid	Deidre Lefever	
2002	Sweet Home Alabama	Stella Kay Perry	
2003	Bringing Down the House	Kate Sanderson	
2004	Garden State	Carol	
2004	I Heart Huckabees	Mrs. Hooten	
2004	Balto III: Wings of Change	Stella (voice)	
2006	Whisper of the Heart	Asako Tsukishima (voice)	
2007	Lucky You	Michelle Carson	
2008	Hero Wanted	Melanie McQueen	
2009	Youth in Revolt	Estelle Twisp	
2010	Barry Munday	Carol Munday	
2010	Life As We Know It	Mrs. Berenson	Uncredited
2012	Hope Springs	Eileen	
2014	Miss Meadows	Mother	Uncredited
2016	The Accountant	Rita Blackburn	
2016	Getting Ed Laid	The Hooker	Short film
2017	Awaken the Shadowman	Evette	
2018	Life Itself	Linda Dempsey	
2018	A Simple Favor	Margaret McLanden	
2020	Superintelligence	President Monahan	
2021	Senior Moment	Caroline Summers	
2022	Wildflower	Peg	
2022	Babylon	Elinor St. John	
2025	Too Good	God	Short film
2027	The Families Stone	TBA	Filming

== Television ==
Year	Title	Role	Notes
1979	Before and After	Woman Bather	Television film
1983	Reggie	Joan Reynolds	Main cast
1983	Teachers Only	Shari	Main cast (season 2)
1984	The Facts of Life	Ellen Slater	Episode: "Next Door"
1984	Maximum Security	Dr. Allison Brody	3 episodes
1984	Single Bars, Single Women	Virge	Television film
1984	Piaf	Marlene Dietrich	Television film
1986	A Fight for Jenny	Valerie Thomas	Television film
1986–91	Designing Women	Charlene Frazier-Stillfield	Main cast
1987	Place at the Table	Susan Singer	Television film
1991	A Seduction in Travis County	Karen	Television film
1991	Locked Up: A Mother's Rage	Cathy	Television film
1992	Overkill: The Aileen Wuornos Story	Aileen Wuornos	Television film
1992	Just My Imagination	Pally Thompson	Television film
1993	Batman: The Animated Series	Helen Ventrix (voice)	Episode: "See No Evil"
1994	Scarlett	Sally Brewton	Miniseries, recurring role
1994	The Yarn Princess	Margaret Thomas	Television film
1995	A Stranger in Town	Rose	Television film
1995–96	High Society	Elinore 'Ellie' Walker	Main cast
1997	Hey Arnold!	Reba Heyerdahl (voice)	Episode: "Phoebe Cheats"
1997	Undue Influence	Dana Colby	Television film
1998	Style & Substance	Chelsea Stevens	Main cast
1998	A Change of Heart	Elaine Mitchell	Television film
2000	The Man Who Came to Dinner	Lorraine Sheldon	Television film
2000–01	Frasier	Lana Gardner	7 episodes
2000–03	Static Shock	Maggie Foley (voice)	3 episodes
2000–04	The District	Detective Sherry Regan	Recurring role
2001	The Oblongs	Pickles Oblong (voice)	Main role
2002–03	In-Laws	Marlene Pellet	Main role
2002–07	Kim Possible	Dr. Ann Possible (voice)	Recurring role
2003	Kim Possible: A Sitch in Time	Dr. Ann Possible (voice)	Television film
2004	Audrey's Rain	Audrey Walker	Television film
2004	Killer Instinct: From the Files of Agent Candice DeLong	Candice DeLong	Television film
2004	A Very Married Christmas	Ellen Griffin	Television film
2004	Hey Arnold!	Reba Heyerdahl (voice)	Episode: "Phoebe's Little Problem/Grandpa's Packard"
2004–05	Center of the Universe	Kate Barnett	Main cast
2005	Kim Possible: So the Drama	Dr. Ann Possible (voice)	Television film
2006–07	24	Martha Logan	Main cast (season 5); guest (season 6)
2007–09	Samantha Who?	Regina Newly	Main cast
2008	American Dad!	Miriam Bullock (voice)	Episode: "One Little Word"
2009	Woke Up Dead	Meryl Greene	Episode: "Mother's Day"
2010	Psych	Gillian Tucker	Episode: "Chivalry Is Not Dead...But Someone Is"
2010–11	Hawaii Five-0	Governor Pat Jameson	4 episodes
2011	$#*! My Dad Says	Rosemary Penworth	4 episodes
2011	William & Catherine: A Royal Romance	Camilla, Duchess of Cornwall	Television film
2011–12	Harry's Law	Roseanna Remmick	Recurring role (season 2)
2013	Hot in Cleveland	Bess	Episode: "Conoga Falls"
2013	Call Me Crazy: A Five Film	Claire	Television film, segment: "Allison"
2013	When Calls the Heart	Frances	Television film
2014	Halt and Catch Fire	LouLu Lutherford	Episode: "High Plains Hardware"
2014	Getting On	Arlene Willy-Weller	2 episodes
2014–15	Sirens	Nora Farrell	3 episodes
2015	The McCarthys	Lydia	Episode: "Gerard's Engagement Party"
2015	Fargo	Floyd Gerhardt	Main cast (season 2)
2015–16	Girlfriends' Guide to Divorce	Katherine Miller	Recurring role (season 2)
2016	Bad Internet	President Powers	Episode: "The President Goes Viral"
2017	Angie Tribeca	Carnie	Episode: "License to Drill"
2017	Veep	Mrs. Walsh	Episode: "Judge"
2017–19	Legion	Melanie Bird	Main cast (seasons 1–2); guest (season 3)
2018	A Shoe Addict's Christmas	Charlie / Guardian Angel	Television film
2018–19	Dirty John	Arlane Hart	Recurring role (season 1)
2018–21	Big Mouth	Depression Kitty (voice)	Recurring role
2019	Arrested Development	Mimi	2 episodes
2019	Watchmen	Agent Laurie Blake	Main cast
2019	Mad About You	Chelsea Stevens-Kobolakis	Episode: "Real Estate for Beginners"
2021	Mare of Easttown	Helen Fahey	Miniseries, main role
2021–26	Hacks	Deborah Vance	Lead role
2022	Ghostwriter	Charlotte (voice)	2 episodes
2024	Saturday Night Live	Herself (host)	Episode: "Jean Smart/Jelly Roll"
2025	The Studio	Herself	Episode: "The Golden Globes"
2025	Charlotte's Web	Narrator	3 episodes

== Theatre ==
Year	Title	Role	Venue	Ref.
1976	Henry VI, Part 2	Queen Margaret	Oregon Shakespeare Festival	
1976	Much Ado About Nothing	Beatrice	Oregon Shakespeare Festival	
1977	Henry VI, Part 3	Lady Elizabeth Grey	Oregon Shakespeare Festival	
1977	A Moon for the Misbegotten	Josie Hogan	Oregon Shakespeare Festival	
1977	A Moon for the Misbegotten	Josie Hogan	Tao House, Danville, California	
1978	Henry IV	Donna Matilde	Intiman Playhouse, Seattle	
1978	The Dance of Death	Alice	Intiman Playhouse, Seattle	
1978	A Christmas Carol	Mrs. Cratchit, Mrs. Fezziwig	Intiman Playhouse, Seattle	
1979	Terra Nova	Kathleen	Alaska Repertory Theater, Anchorage	
1979	Catsplay	Ilona	A Contemporary Theatre, Seattle	
1979	Fallen Angels	Performer	Seattle Repertory Theatre	
1979	Tartuffe	Elmire	2nd Stage, Seattle	
1979	Medea	Chorus	Intiman Theatre, Seattle	
1979	A History of the American Film	Eve	Seattle Repertory Theatre	
1980	Macbeth	Lady Macbeth	Pittsburgh Public Theater	
1980–81	Last Summer at Bluefish Cove	Lil	The Actors Playhouse (Off-Broadway)	
1981	Piaf	Marlene Dietrich	Plymouth Theatre (Broadway)	
1981	Kean	Elena Koefeld	Hartford Stage	
1982	The Greeks	Clytemnestra, Helen	Hartford Stage	
1985	Strange Snow	Martha	The Coast Playhouse, Los Angeles	
1988	Three Sisters	Natasha Prozorov	Intiman Playhouse, Seattle	
1992	The End of the Day	Various	Playwrights Horizons (Off-Broadway)	
1996	Fit to Be Tied	Nessa	Playwrights Horizons (Off-Broadway)	
2000	The Man Who Came to Dinner	Lorraine Sheldon	Roundabout Theatre Company (Broadway)	
2005	Lady Windermere's Fan	Mrs. Erlynne	Williamstown Theatre Festival, MA	
2025	Call Me Izzy	Izzy	Studio 54, Broadway	
