= A Change of Heart =

A Change of Heart may refer to:

- A Change of Heart (TV series), a Hong Kong television series
- A Change of Heart (album), a 1987 album by David Sanborn
- "A Change of Heart" (Bernard Butler song), 1998
- "A Change of Heart" (The 1975 song), 2016
- A Change of Heart (film), a 2017 comedy film starring Jim Belushi
- A Father for Brittany (also known as A Change of Heart), a 1998 Lifetime television film
- A Change of Heart, a 1998 TV movie starring Jean Smart
- "A Change of Heart" (How I Met Your Mother), a 2011 television episode
- "A Change of Heart" (Knots Landing), a 1986 television episode

== See also ==
- Change of Heart (disambiguation)
