= Johanna Day =

American actress (b. 1964)

- Born: 1964 (age 61–62); Winchester, Virginia, U.S.
- Education: American Academy of Dramatic Arts
- Occupation: Actress

Johanna Day (born 1964) is an American actress, known for her stage performances. She was nominated for two Tony Awards for her performances in the 2000 play Proof and the 2016 production of the play Sweat. Her other accolades include a Helen Hayes Award and an Obie Award, as well as nominations for a Drama Desk Award, a Drama League Award, an Outer Critics Circle Award and two Lucille Lortel Awards.

Day performed on both Broadway and off-Broadway stage. She made her New York stage debut in 1004 appearing in 3 Postcards by Craig Lucas. Her notable Broadway credits include August: Osage County, You Can't Take It With You and Call Me Izzy. On television she had the recurring roles in All My Children (2002-2003), The Knick (2014-2015) and Madam Secretary (2014-2019).

== Early life ==
Johanna was born in Winchester, Virginia and grew up in Rappahannock County, Virginia. She is the daughter and ninth child of Eileen Mitchell Day of Sperryville and Walter Day of Flint Hill. She graduated from the American Academy of Dramatic Arts in 1984.

== Career ==
In 1994, Day made her off-Broadway debut starring in the Craig Lucas' musical, 3 Postcards. Her Broadway debut was in the 2000 play Proof by David Auburn for which she was nominated for a Tony Award for Best Featured Actress in a Play. Also in 2000, Day made her screen debut appearing in a small role in the film Unbreakable. From 2002 to 2003 she played Marilyn Stafford on the ABC daytime soap opera, All My Children. She later guest-starred on prime time dramas Law & Order, Law & Order: Special Victims Unit, Law & Order: Criminal Intent, Law & Order: Trial by Jury, Judging Amy, The Americans and Elementary.

In 2007, Day returned to Broadway replacing Amy Morton in the role of Barbara Fordham on August: Osage County. She appeared with Tracy Letts and Parker Posey in the world premiere of Will Eno's play The Realistic Joneses on April 20, 2012 at the Yale Repertory Theatre. In August 2013 Johanna Day costarred with Reg Rogers in the world premiere of Carly Mensch's play Oblivion at the Westport Country Playhouse. She costarred with Amelia Campbell in Penn State Centre Stage 2013 production of David Lindsay-Abaire's play Good People. From 2014 to 2015 she performed on Broadway revival of You Can't Take It With You.

On television, Day played the recurring role as Admiral Ellen Hill in the CBS political drama series, Madam Secretary from 2014 to 2019 appearing in 28 episodes. She played Eunice Showalter during the second season of period drama The Knick from 2014 to 2015 and in 2018 appeared in the miniseries Escape at Dannemora. She later made appearances in New Amsterdam, The Good Fight and Bull. Her film credits include True Story (2015), The Post (2017) and Save Yourselves! (2020).

In 2017, Day received her second Tony Award for Best Featured Actress in a Play nomination for performance in Sweat by Lynn Nottage. In 2022, she appeared as Marta in Denis Johnson’s play Des Moines that takes place entirely in a kitchen. In 2025 she replaced Jean Smart in the lead role on Call Me Izzy for number of performances.

== Credits ==
=== Broadway ===
- Proof (Oct 10, 2000 - Sep 09, 2001)
- August: Osage County (Oct 14, 2008 - May 24, 2009)
- You Can't Take It With You (Sep 28, 2014 - Feb 22, 2015)
- Sweat (Mar 26, 2017 - Jun 25, 2017)
- The Nap (Sep 27, 2018 - Nov 11, 2018)
- How I Learned to Drive (Apr 19, 2022 - Jun 12, 2022)
- Call Me Izzy (Jun 12, 2025 - Aug 24, 2025)

=== Off-Broadway ===
- 1994 3 Postcards, by Craig Lucas & Craig Carnelia, Circle in the Square Theatre
- 1996 Blue Window, by Craig Lucas, New York City Center Stage
- 1997 How I Learned to Drive, by Paula Vogel, Century Center for the Performing Arts
- 1998 Once in a Lifetime, by Moss Hart & George S. Kaufman, Linda Gross Theater
- 2002 Helen, by Ellen McLaughlin, The Public Theater
- 2002 Bliss, by Ben Bettenbender, Rattlestick Playwrights Theater
- 2006 The Rainmaker, by N. Richard Nash, Arena Stage
- 2006 Satellites, by Diana Son, Public Theater
- 2007 Peter and Jerry, by Edward Albee, Second Stage Theatre
- 2008 Almost an Evening, by Ethan Coen, Atlantic Theater Company
- 2010 Oliver Parker!, by Elizabeth Meriwether, Cherry Lane Theater
- 2010 Middletown, by Will Eno, Vineyard Theatre
- 2012 Misery, by William Goldman, Bucks County Playhouse
- 2022 Des Moines, by Denis Johnson, Theatre for a New Audience

=== Film ===
- 2000 Unbreakable
- 2005 The Exonerated
- 2014 Birdman
- 2015 True Story
- 2015 The Great Gilly Hopkins
- 2015 My Name Is David
- 2017 The Post
- 2020 What Is Life Worth
- 2020 Save Yourselves!

== Awards ==
Johanna Day won the Helen Hayes Award as Leading Actress in a Resident Play for her starring role in the 2006 Arena Stage production of The Rainmaker.

In 2000, she was nominated for a Tony Award for her performance in Proof.

In 2008, she was a nominee for the Drama Desk Award for Outstanding Featured Actress in a Play for her role of Ann in the Second Stage Theatre production of Edward Albee's Peter and Jerry.

In 2014, she won an Obie Award for her performance in Appropriate at the Alice Griffin Jewel Box Theatre.

In 2017, she was nominated for a Tony Award for Best Featured Actress in a Play for her role in Sweat.
