= Chris Eboch =

American children's book author

- Born: United States
- Occupation: Writer

Chris Eboch (/ˈiːbɒk/ EE-bok) is a children's book author currently living in New Mexico.

She is the New Mexico Regional Advisor for the Society of Children's Book Writers and Illustrators and a teacher for the Institute of Children's Literature. She also writes novels for adults under the name "Kris Bock".

She is the sister of screenwriter Douglas J. Eboch (Sweet Home Alabama).

== Books ==
- The Well of Sacrifice, a middle grade historical drama set in ninth century Mayan Guatemala
- Life among the Maya
- Modern Nations of the World: Yemen
- Modern Nations of the World: Turkey
- Science Measurements; and Science Tools.
- Rattled (writing as Kris Bock)
- Eyes of Pharaoh
- Childhood of Famous Americans: Jesse Owens (fictionalized biography for elementary school children)
- Childhood of Famous Americans: Milton Hershey (fictionalized biography for elementary school children)
- What We Found (writing as Kris Bock)
- Whispers in the Dark (writing as Kris Bock)

Haunted Series

- Ghost on the Stairs
- Knight in the Shadows
- Riverboat Phantom
- Ghost Miner's Treasure
