= Change of Heart =

Change of Heart may refer to:

== Film and television ==
- Change of Heart (1928 film), a French silent film
- Change of Heart (1934 film), starring Janet Gaynor
- Change of Heart (1938 film), starring Gloria Stuart
- Hit Parade of 1943, an American musical film also known as Change of Heart
- Change of Heart (TV series), a dating television show
- "Change of Heart" (Doctors), a 2004 television episode
- "Change of Heart" (Star Trek: Deep Space Nine), a 1998 television episode
- "Change of Heart", an episode in series 4 of Holby City
- "Change of Heart", a season 2 episode of The Loud House
- "Change of Heart", an episode in season 1 of the American animated television show The Zeta Project

== Music ==
- Change of Heart (band), a Canadian alternative rock band

=== Albums ===
- Change of Heart (Eric Carmen album), a 1978 album and title song
- Change of Heart (Change album), a 1984 album and title song by Change
- Change of Heart, a 1988 album and title song by Jon Gibson
- Change of Heart (Beverley Craven album), 2014

=== Extended plays ===
- Change of Heart (Kingswood EP), 2012

=== Songs ===
- "Change of Heart" (Tom Petty and the Heartbreakers song), 1983
- "Change of Heart", a 1984 song by Toto from Isolation
- "Change of Heart" (Cyndi Lauper song), 1986
- "Change of Heart" (The Judds song), 1988
- "Change of Heart", a 1989 song by Pat Metheny, Dave Holland and Roy Haynes on Question and Answer
- "Change of Heart", a 1991 song by Diana Ross on The Force Behind the Power
- "Change of Heart" (Jimmy Barnes song), 1995
- "Change of Heart", a 2009 song by El Perro del Mar's on Love Is Not Pop
- "Change of Heart", a 2014 song by TOPS on Picture You Staring

== In print ==
- Change of Heart (novel), a 2008 novel by Jodi Picoult
- Change of Heart (street paper), a newspaper written and sold by homeless individuals in Lawrence, Kansas
- Peach Girl: Change of Heart, a collection of the final ten books in the Peach Girl manga series

== See also ==
- A Change of Heart (disambiguation)
