= The Click (Hacks) =

- Hacks episode
- Episode no.: Season 2 Episode 6
- Directed by: Paul W. Downs
- Written by: Aisha Muharrar; Joe Mande
- Original release date: May 26, 2022
- Running time: 34 minutes

Guest appearance
- Devon Sawa as Jason

Episode chronology
← Previous "Retired"	Next → "On the Market"
- Hacks season 2

"The Click" is the sixth episode of the second season of American comedy-drama television series Hacks and the sixteenth overall. It was co-written by Aisha Muharrar and Joe Mande and directed by series co-creator Paul W. Downs. In the episode, Deborah (Jean Smart) has a one night stand with a much younger man (Devon Sawa) that helps her perfect her new stand-up show. "The Click" was released on May 26, 2022 on HBO Max and has an approximate running time of 34 minutes.

Smart won her second successive Primetime Emmy Award for Outstanding Lead Actress in a Comedy Series for her performance.

== Plot ==
Deborah is struggling to perfect her new show. On a night out in Memphis with Kiki, Ava, and Ava's mother, she meets a much younger man, Jason, and goes home with him. Ava gets upset that her mother refuses to meaningfully bond with her. When Deborah returns from her one night stand, the thread of the show clicks into place—she will admit to her own shortcomings in an act of accountability. She and Ava revise the show, and Deborah's performances are well received on the tour.

== Production ==
Devon Sawa, cast as Deborah's young one-night stand, was a fan of the show when he was invited to audition. Jean Smart was included in the process of selecting the actor for the intimate scene, and her first choice was Sawa, who went on to be cast.

== Reception ==
Jael Goldfine of Vulture rated the episode 5/5 stars.

Jean Smart won her second successive Primetime Emmy Award for Outstanding Lead Actress in a Comedy Series for this episode. Jane Adams was nominated for a Primetime Emmy Award for Outstanding Guest Actress in a Comedy Series. Adam Bricker was nominated for a Primetime Emmy Award for Outstanding Cinematography For A Single-Camera Series (Half-Hour).
