= Hacks season 2 =

Hacks
- Season 2
- Promotional poster
- Starring: Jean Smart; Hannah Einbinder; Carl Clemons-Hopkins
- No. of episodes: 8

Release
- Original network: HBO Max
- Original release: May 12 – June 2, 2022

Season chronology
- ← Previous; Season 1 Next → Season 3

The second season of the HBO Max streaming dark comedy drama television series Hacks debuted on May 12, 2022, and concluded on June 2, 2022. It consists of eight episodes, each with approximate runtime of 30–35 minutes. The season centers Deborah Vance perfecting material for her new stand-up show, in which she shares previously unrevealed information about her personal life. In an effort to become a better person, Ava gets a "dumb phone" and swears off alcohol. The season received critical acclaim. Jean Smart won her second successive Primetime Emmy Award for Outstanding Lead Actress in a Comedy Series.

== Plot ==
Fresh off her final middling Vegas performance, Deborah plans a nationwide tour to relaunch her career. Ava is wracked by guilt because of the email she sent to two British television producers detailing Deborah's problematic behavior. Marcus copes with his breakup by getting a puppy, Joe, and by socializing with a group of younger gay men whom he plies with money and gifts.

Jimmy gets Kayla switched off his desk by HR rep Barbara by agreeing to attend an anger management course. He also meets with Janet Stone, the British producers' manager, to ensure that Ava's email will remain confidential. An agreement is reached but falls apart when Jimmy accidentally reveals he backed out of purchasing her house. Jimmy appeals to his boss, Kayla's father, for help. He agrees but asks Jimmy to bring Kayla back on as his assistant.

During a visit to Sedona to see Deborah's psychic, Ava confesses that she sent the email. Deborah is livid. Ava expects Deborah to fire her, but the next morning Deborah asks her to continue the trip. Minutes later, Jimmy informs Ava that Deborah is suing Ava for violating her NDA.

Deborah, Ava, and Damien head out together on Deborah's tour bus, managed by the cantankerous "Weed". Ava buys a "dumb phone" and vows to remain sober. Deborah defends Ava when Weed accidentally throws out Ava's father's remains. They backtrack to a fast-food dumpster and find the ashes.

Marcus accidentally books Deborah a gig on a lesbian cruise, where Ava is immediately taken with a non-monogamous lesbian couple. Although Deborah is well received at first and even makes strides in overcoming her lifelong contempt for lesbians, the gig is ruined when she carelessly makes a misogynistic joke during her set.

One night, Marcus returns from the club to find that Joe has ingested some of his prescription medication. The emergency vet treats the dog but refuses to release him back into Marcus's care on the grounds that he is a negligent owner. Marcus is distraught, so Deborah invites him to join them on tour.

At a tour stop in the Midwest, Deborah runs into one of her old stand-up friends, Susan Essig, who manages a Lord & Taylor. Deborah feels guilty because years ago she sabotaged Susan at a stand-up showcase. She confesses to Susan, who states that she actually quit comedy due to an unplanned pregnancy. Ava and Marcus bond at the State Fair over their shared insecurities.

While at a show in Memphis, Ava's mother surprises the group by showing up. She argues with Ava when the latter learns that her mother, who continues to question her career choices, is supporting herself by participating in a MLM scheme. Deborah goes home with Jason, a much younger man she meets at a bar.

Deborah plans to tape a stand-up special with the confessional material. She enlists her old friend Elaine Carter to direct, but the network executives she approaches for financing are dismissive of her. Jimmy quits Latitude in protest when the partners try to reassign Deborah to a different manager; Kayla goes with him. Deborah vows to produce the special herself, with Marty even offering her the use of the Palmetto. Deborah is surprised to learn that he's engaged to his age-appropriate girlfriend.

Ava's old friend Taylor invites Ava to do a short-term writing gig in LA that will overlap with Deborah's taping. Deborah encourages her to take the opportunity. The night of the special, Ava surprises Deborah by flying back early. During the taping, an audience member has a cardiac event. He is rushed out by the paramedics but dies on the gurney. A quick-thinking Jimmy convinces the audience that he's still alive, saving Deborah from humiliation.

Deborah's DVD release of the special, My Bad, sells out in minutes on QVC. Jimmy informs Deborah that there is a bidding war for the rights to the special.

At the network's release party, Deborah publicly thanks Ava for her work on the special before firing her, telling her she needs to get away from Deborah and work on her own material. Ava departs to refocus on her own career. Back in Los Angeles, Jimmy informs her that Deborah has also dropped the lawsuit.

== Cast and characters ==
=== Main ===
- Jean Smart as Deborah Vance, a revered stand-up comedian in the twilight of her career
- Hannah Einbinder as Ava Daniels, a young comedy writer and Deborah's writing partner
- Carl Clemons-Hopkins as Marcus, the newly promoted CEO of Deborah's company

=== Recurring ===
- Paul W. Downs as Jimmy LuSaque Jr., Deborah and Ava's manager at Latitude Arts Agency
- Megan Stalter as Kayla Schaeffer, Jimmy's assistant
- Martha Kelly as Barbara, a human resources representative at Latitude
- Mark Indelicato as Damien, Deborah's personal assistant
- Rose Abdoo as Josefina, Deborah's estate manager
- Joe Mande as Ray, a hotel clerk for the Palmetto
- Christopher McDonald as Marty Ghilain, CEO of the Palmetto Casino
- Jane Adams as Nina Daniels, Ava's mother
- Poppy Liu as Kiki, Deborah's blackjack dealer
- Kaitlin Olson as Deborah "DJ" Vance Jr., Deborah's daughter
- W. Earl Brown as Michael Schaeffer, Jimmy's boss and Kayla's father. Brown replaces Brent Sexton, who played Michael in the first season.
- Michael Garza as Silas, Jimmy's temporary assistant
- Ming-Na Wen as Janet Stone, a talent manager with a grudge against Jimmy
- Angela E. Gibbs as Robin, Marcus's mother
- Luenell as Miss Loretta, Robin's friend
- Laurie Metcalf as Weed, Deborah's tour manager
- Susie Essman as Elaine Carter, Deborah's old friend and a director
- Ally Maki as Taylor, a television producer and friend of Ava's
- Caitlin Reilly as Jessica, a network executive

=== Guest ===
- Kirby Howell-Baptiste as Daisy, a British TV producer who previously interviewed Ava
- Wayne Newton as himself, a Las Vegas entertainer and Deborah's friend
- Carole Raphaelle Davis as Victoria Calle, Marty's girlfriend
- Lauren Weedman as Jo Pezzimenti, the mayor of Las Vegas
- Paul Felder as Aidan, DJ's husband and Deborah's son-in-law
- Rebecca Field as Lorna, a woman Deborah meets at a rest stop
- Polly Draper as Diana, Deborah's psychic
- Kimia Behpoornia as Lori, a comedian who opens for Deborah on one of her tour stops
- Maleah Goldberg and May Hong as Valentina and Morgan, a lesbian couple Ava meets on a cruise
- Harriet Sansom Harris as Susan Essig, a former stand-up comedian Deborah knew at the beginning of her career
- Devon Sawa as Jason, a younger man Deborah meets at a bar
- Kyle Gass as Axel, one of Deborah's stalkers
- Jessica Chaffin as Jill, Ava's pro bono legal advisor
- Paula Andrea Placido as Rian, Ava's tenant
- Lorenza Izzo as Ruby, Ava's ex-girlfriend

== Episodes ==
No. overall	No. in season	Title	Directed by	Written by	Original release date
11	1	"There Will Be Blood"	Lucia Aniello	Lucia Aniello & Paul W. Downs & Jen Statsky	May 12, 2022
Deborah and Ava return to Las Vegas, with Deborah feeling excited to start fresh after her last show was considered a flop. Ava, however, is racked with guilt after getting confirmation that her nasty email about Deborah was received by the British writers. Jimmy begs Ava to not say anything, fearing Deborah's wrath if she found out. Ava also receives half of her father's ashes in a tennis ball holder. Jimmy and Kayla meet with HR manager Barbara after a hotel room incident during their Las Vegas trip to Deborah's final show. The higher-ups (which include Kayla's father) dismiss the complaint, but Barbara coyly suggests that she report Jimmy for "anger issues" so Barbara can move Kayla to a new assignment. Deborah and Ava attend an MMA fight at the Palmetto to support Aidan, DJ's husband. Deborah is speechless when she bumps into Marty at the event with his new, age-appropriate girlfriend. Deborah starts her road trip immediately after the fight.
12	2	"Quid Pro Quo"	Lucia Aniello	Lucia Aniello & Paul W. Downs & Jen Statsky	May 12, 2022
Ava is unnerved by Deborah's generosity during their road trip. Jimmy attempts to bury Ava's email by meeting Janet Stone, the talent agent who manages the British writers. The meeting backfires and Janet even threatens to send the email to TMZ. A desperate Jimmy turns to Kayla's father, who will only help if Jimmy takes back Kayla as his assistant. Jimmy accepts, loses his new effective assistant, and is still committed to taking the year-long anger management program. Deborah takes Ava to see her psychic in Sedona, and the psychic predicts a cosmic wrecking ball heading Deborah's way, which Deborah interprets as her new material taking the world by storm. Unable to hold in the truth any longer, Ava confesses to Deborah about her email that the British writers plan to use in their show. Deborah becomes enraged when she learns Helen Mirren will be the show's leading actress, essentially confirming that the show will make it to air. The misery is compounded when Deborah demands Ava to read her the email, which includes scathing remarks about Deborah as a person and a mother. Despite everything, Deborah does not fire Ava, but Ava receives a call from Jimmy that Deborah is suing her for breaking her NDA.
13	3	"Trust the Process"	Lucia Aniello	Lucia Aniello & Paul W. Downs & Jen Statsky	May 19, 2022
Deborah and Ava officially start their tour and meet their new, eccentric tour manager, who insists on being called "Weed". Deborah gives Ava the cold shoulder after the revelation in the previous episode, and Deborah's material still fails to land with audiences. Marcus continues to miss Wilson and buys a new puppy to help with the loneliness. Weed unwittingly throws out Ava's tennis ball canister (with her father's ashes), mistaking it for trash. Deborah forces Weed to turn the bus around so Ava can find it, missing a sold-out Oklahoma City show in the process. Ava thanks Deborah for her act of kindness, and resolves to spread the ashes around the country after talking with Ray.
14	4	"The Captain's Wife"	Lucia Aniello	Ariel Karlin & Pat Regan	May 19, 2022
Ava is apprehensive about joining Deborah on a gay cruise, fearing the water and being unable to swim. Deborah is excited about the cruise gig and plans to use her original routines. However, Deborah is thrown for a loop when she discovers Marcus accidentally booked the gig on a cruise that is exclusively for lesbians, who do not "get" her material. She is more rattled when she receives a FaceTime call from Marty, which ends up being a pocket-dial accident. Ava enjoys her newfound popularity on the cruise and helps Deborah adapt to her new surroundings. Deborah's show starts off on the right note, but she blows it when she picks on an audience member and makes one blunder after another. Deborah is asked to leave the cruise via a dinghy, taking Ava with her. A lonely Marcus continues to flounder, pushing his mother away and clubbing all night. He runs into Wilson while high on MDMA and proclaims his love for him. He returns home to find his puppy has consumed some of his Adderall, and immediately takes him to the veterinarian. The vet refuses to return the dog to Marcus while under the influence; Marcus has his mother come to claim the dog. Deborah calls Marcus and, sensing his distress, asks him to replace Weed as the tour manager.
15	5	"Retired"	Paul W. Downs	Andrew Law	May 26, 2022
Marcus joins Deborah, Ava, and Damien on the tour, and they make a pit stop at a mall prior to their gig at a county fair. Deborah learns her signature perfume is being discontinued at the mall's Lord & Taylor, so she proceeds to clear out their entire beauty counter. She then bumps into an old friend named Susan, who works in the store's shoe department. Deborah is surprised at how happy Susan is with her life, despite failing to make it as a comic. Deborah later confesses to Ava that she sabotaged Susan's career out of fear for her own. Deborah comes clean to Susan at the fair, but Susan tells her she stopped performing because she didn't want to sacrifice her future family for a showbiz career. Ava and Marcus find solace in each other when they come to terms with the fact, they have nothing in their lives going on besides helping Deborah. After a tender heart-to-heart moment about the past, Deborah teaches Ava how to float.
16	6	"The Click"	Paul W. Downs	Aisha Muharrar & Joe Mande	May 26, 2022
After bombing another performance, Deborah flies Kiki out to Memphis in an attempt to break the cycle. Ava's mother Nina also shows up in Memphis; an unnerved Ava struggles to deal with her mother's views about their past. Deborah and Ava finally make a breakthrough after Deborah has a one-night stand, and they incorporate more self-deprecating humor into Deborah's new material. The new shows end up being much more successful, with one audience even giving Deborah a standing ovation. Ava, however, is unsuccessful in improving her relationship with Nina, who has a massive meltdown when she learns about Deborah's lawsuit. Ava lies about having a pro bono lawyer to deal with the litigation, and tells her mom that she's proud of her for trying to move on with her life.
17	7	"On the Market"	Lucia Aniello	Samantha Riley	June 2, 2022
Deborah, Ava, Marcus and Damien arrive at Deborah's home in L.A. to pitch the idea of Deborah doing a special. Jimmy meets with Kayla's father to sell the idea; instead, his boss tells him to cut Deborah loose and focus on younger acts. Ava goes to her condo to get some tax returns for the lawsuit and meets the new subletter. On her way to meet with her lawyer, Ava sees her friend Taylor and apologizes to her for the way she treated her in the past. Ava's subletter calls her because she has locked herself out. Ava comes over to let her in and ends up spending the night with her. Deborah makes her pitch to several different companies but only one makes an offer, which is for a half hour special. Jimmy quits the company; Kayla defies her father by quitting as well to follow him. Deborah decides to self-fund the special by selling her L.A. home.
18	8	"The One, the Only"	Trent O'Donnell	Lucia Aniello & Paul W. Downs & Jen Statsky	June 2, 2022
Deborah and Marty bid against each other at a Sotheby's auction. Taylor offers Ava a one-week job in L.A. Jimmy learns that Janet is poaching his clients. Deborah tells Marcus that Marty agreed to allow her to tape her special at the Palmetto. Ava tells Deborah about the job offer and Deborah insists that she take it even if it means missing the taping. The night of the taping, Janet goes to see Deborah to discuss taking over her representation. Ava returns early from L.A. to attend the taping. During the taping, a man who is sitting next to Jimmy passes out. The medics carry the man out and he dies in the lobby. Jimmy comes back into the theater and announces that the man is okay. The taping continues and is a success. Deborah tells Jimmy his dad would be proud of him, and then tells Janet that she is staying with Jimmy as her representative. Deborah offers the DVD of her special on QVC and it sells out within minutes. Jimmy calls Deborah to tell her that every network wants to buy the rights to the show. Deborah fires Ava and tells her that she has her own mountain to climb. Jimmy, now running his own agency, calls Ava to offer her a job on the series that she went to L.A. to help write, and also tells her that Deborah is dropping the lawsuit. As the camera pans away, the television is on QVC and Deborah is smiling.

== Production ==
Co-creator Paul W. Downs discussed the focus of season two: "What we were most interested in exploring was what it's like for someone like her to keep bombing," Downs said. "It might be something novel and might be something exciting in the beginning, but someone like her who has fans that come to see her, and sells out a 2,000-seat theater in Vegas and crushes, what is it like when you're on the road in small venues and not doing well?" Downs and co-creators Lucia Aniello and Jen Statsky wanted to continue to feature Kayla and Jimmy's dynamic, as well as show a more vulnerable side to Deborah by giving her a lover. Of the season finale, Aniello stated, "We feel like we have just told two chapters of a larger story. We feel like what we've done at the end of season two is just as much of a cliffhanger as what we did at the end of season one, considering what we intend to do with the story."

Production designer Alec Contestabile oversaw production of over 130 new sets for the season, which primarily takes place during Deborah's stand-up tour.

Season two has a total of eight episodes. The trailer for season two was released on April 14, 2022. The first two episodes debuted on HBO Max on May 12, 2022. Hacks was renewed for a third season on June 16, 2022.

== Reception ==
=== Critical response ===
The second season received critical acclaim. On Rotten Tomatoes, it has an approval rating of 100% based on 54 critic reviews, with an average rating of 8.6/10. The website's critics consensus states, "Hacks hits the road, but Jean Smart and Hannah Einbinder remain very much at home with each other in a sterling sophomore season that finds novel ways to deepen the central pair's lovable friendship." On Metacritic, it received a score of 88 out of 100 based on 24 critics, indicating "universal acclaim".

Danette Chavez wrote positively of the season in TheWrap, "Hacks remains one of the most consummately funny shows on TV, defying the sophomore slump to uncover ever more trenchant truths about ambition, failure, and the blurring line between work and family." Caroline Framke praised the direction in a review for Variety: "Still, as funny as "Hacks" is, and as poignant as it can be, the show's most enduring strength is still its directing. Honed so brilliantly by Aniello, from some of the best "Broad City" episodes until her "Hacks" Emmy win, it finds surreal and beautiful moments no matter the circumstance." RogerEbert.com's Brian Tallerico noted the acting of star Jean Smart: "The range of her work in "Fargo," "Watchmen," and now "Hacks" is stunning, and the character she's crafting on this HBO Max Emmy winner for directing, writing, and actress could be career-defining."

=== Awards and nominations ===
The season received 17 Primetime Emmy Award and Primetime Creative Arts Emmy Awards nominations, including Outstanding Lead Actress in a Comedy Series for Jean Smart, which she won for the second year in a row.

Year	Award	Category	Nominee(s)	Result	Ref.
2022	AACTA International Awards	Best Comedy Series	Hacks	Nominated	
2022	AACTA International Awards	Best Actress in a Series	Jean Smart	Nominated	
2022	AFI Awards	TV Program of the Year	Hacks	Won	
2022	Artios Awards	Outstanding Achievement in Casting – Television Comedy Series	Jeanne McCarthy, Nicole Abellera Hallman, Anna Mayworm	Won	
2022	Dorian Awards	Best TV Comedy	Hacks	Nominated	
2022	Dorian Awards	Best LGBTQ TV Show	Hacks	Nominated	
2022	Dorian Awards	Best TV Musical Performance	Jean Smart (for "You Make Me Feel Like a Natural Woman")	Nominated	
2022	Dorian Awards	Best TV Performance	Jean Smart	Nominated	
2022	Dorian Awards	Best Supporting TV Performance	Hannah Einbinder	Nominated	
2022	Hollywood Critics Association TV Awards	Best Streaming Series, Comedy	Hacks	Nominated	
2022	Hollywood Critics Association TV Awards	Best Actress in a Streaming Series, Comedy	Jean Smart	Nominated	
2022	Hollywood Critics Association TV Awards	Best Supporting Actor in a Streaming Series, Comedy	Paul W. Downs	Nominated	
2022	Hollywood Critics Association TV Awards	Best Supporting Actress in a Streaming Series, Comedy	Hannah Einbinder	Won	
2022	Hollywood Critics Association TV Awards	Best Directing in a Streaming Series, Comedy	Lucia Aniello (for "There Will Be Blood")	Won	
2022	Hollywood Critics Association TV Awards	Best Writing in a Streaming Series, Comedy	Lucia Aniello, Paul W. Downs, and Jen Statsky (for "The One, The Only")	Won	
2022	Primetime Emmy Awards	Outstanding Comedy Series	Jen Statsky, Lucia Aniello, Paul W. Downs, Michael Schur, David Miner, Morgan Sackett, Joe Mande, Andrew Law, Aisha Muharrar, Ashley Glazier, Samantha Riley, Seth Edelstein and Jessica Chaffin	Nominated	
2022	Primetime Emmy Awards	Outstanding Lead Actress in a Comedy Series	Jean Smart (for "The Click")	Won	
2022	Primetime Emmy Awards	Outstanding Supporting Actress in a Comedy Series	Hannah Einbinder	Nominated	
2022	Primetime Emmy Awards	Outstanding Directing for a Comedy Series	Lucia Aniello (for "There Will Be Blood")	Nominated	
2022	Primetime Emmy Awards	Outstanding Writing for a Comedy Series	Lucia Aniello, Paul W. Downs and Jen Statsky (for "The One, the Only")	Nominated	
2022	Primetime Creative Arts Emmy Awards	Outstanding Guest Actor in a Comedy Series	Christopher McDonald (for "The One, the Only")	Nominated	
2022	Primetime Creative Arts Emmy Awards	Outstanding Guest Actress in a Comedy Series	Jane Adams (for "The Click")	Nominated	
2022	Primetime Creative Arts Emmy Awards	Outstanding Guest Actress in a Comedy Series	Harriet Sansom Harris (for "Retired")	Nominated	
2022	Primetime Creative Arts Emmy Awards	Outstanding Guest Actress in a Comedy Series	Laurie Metcalf (for "Trust the Process")	Won	
2022	Primetime Creative Arts Emmy Awards	Outstanding Guest Actress in a Comedy Series	Kaitlin Olson (for "There Will Be Blood")	Nominated	
2022	Primetime Creative Arts Emmy Awards	Outstanding Casting for a Comedy Series	Jeanne McCarthy and Nicole Abellera Hallman	Nominated	
2022	Primetime Creative Arts Emmy Awards	Outstanding Cinematography for a Single-Camera Series (Half-Hour)	Adam Bricker (for "The Click")	Nominated	
2022	Primetime Creative Arts Emmy Awards	Outstanding Contemporary Costumes	Kathleen Felix-Hager and Karen Bellamy (for "The Captain's Wife")	Won	
2022	Primetime Creative Arts Emmy Awards	Outstanding Contemporary Hairstyling	Jennifer Bell (for "The Captain's Wife")	Nominated	
2022	Primetime Creative Arts Emmy Awards	Outstanding Production Design for a Narrative Program (Half-Hour)	Alec Contestabile, Rob Tokarz and Jennifer Lukehart (for "Trust the Process")	Nominated	
2022	Primetime Creative Arts Emmy Awards	Outstanding Single-Camera Picture Editing for a Comedy Series	Jessica Brunetto (for "There Will Be Blood")	Nominated	
2022	Primetime Creative Arts Emmy Awards	Outstanding Sound Mixing for a Comedy or Drama Series (Half-Hour) and Animation	John W. Cook II, Ben Wilkins and Jim Lakin (for "The Captain's Wife")	Nominated	
2022	Television Critics Association Awards	Program of the Year	Hacks	Nominated	
2022	Television Critics Association Awards	Outstanding Achievement in Comedy	Hacks	Nominated	
2022	Television Critics Association Awards	Individual Achievement in Comedy	Jean Smart	Nominated	
2023	Critics' Choice Television Awards	Best Comedy Series	Hacks	Nominated	
2023	Critics' Choice Television Awards	Best Actress in a Comedy Series	Jean Smart	Won	
2023	Golden Globe Awards	Best Television Series - Musical or Comedy	Hacks	Nominated	
2023	Golden Globe Awards	Best Performance by an Actress in a Supporting Role in a Musical-Comedy or Drama Television Series	Hannah Einbinder	Nominated	
2023	Golden Globe Awards	Best Performance by an Actress in a Television Series - Musical or Comedy	Jean Smart	Nominated	
2023	Producers Guild Awards	Best Episodic Comedy	Hacks	Nominated	
2023	Satellite Awards	Best Television Series, Comedy or Musical	Hacks	Nominated	
2023	Satellite Awards	Best Actress in a Series, Comedy or Musical	Jean Smart	Nominated	
2023	Screen Actors Guild Awards	Outstanding Performance by an Ensemble in a Comedy Series	Carl Clemons-Hopkins, Paul W. Downs, Hannah Einbinder, Mark Indelicato, Jean Smart, and Megan Stalter	Nominated	
2023	Screen Actors Guild Awards	Outstanding Performance by a Female Actor in a Comedy Series	Jean Smart	Won	
2023	Writers Guild of America Awards	Comedy Series	Various (Note: Lucia Aniello, Jessica Chaffin, Paul W. Downs, Ariel Karlin, Andrew Law, Joe Mande, Aisha Muharrar, Pat Regan, Samantha Riley, Jen Statsky)	Nominated	
2023	Writers Guild of America Awards	Episodic Comedy	Lucia Aniello, Paul W. Downs and Jen Statsky (for "The One, The Only")	Won	
