= Douglas J. Eboch =

American screenwriter

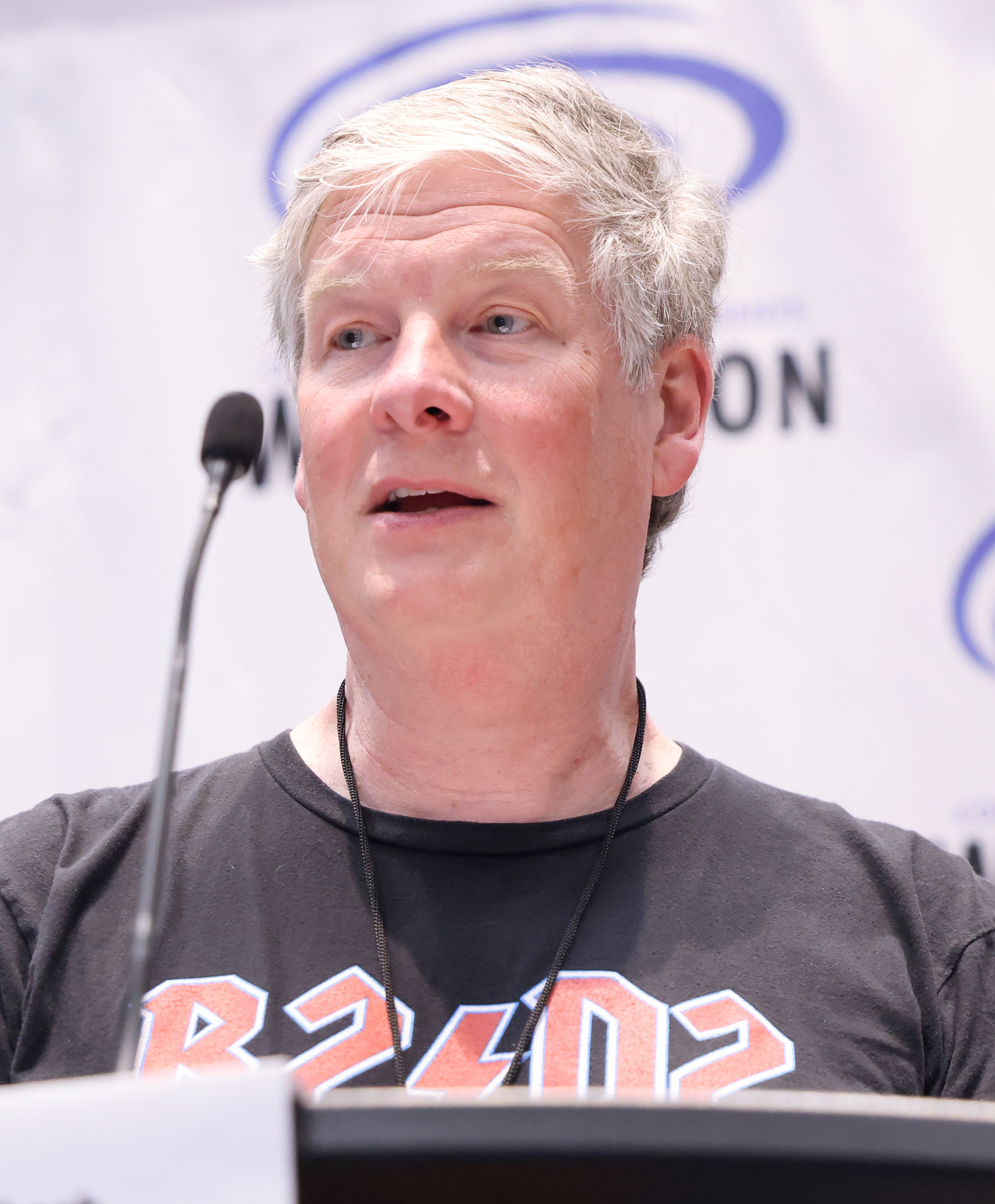
- Eboch in 2025
- Born: December 10, 1967 (age 58); Chicago, United States
- Education: University of Southern California
- Occupations: screenwriter, author, educator
- Known for: Sweet Home Alabama

Douglas J. Eboch (born December 10, 1967) is an American screenwriter, author and educator, best known for the 2002 comedy Sweet Home Alabama, starring Reese Witherspoon, Josh Lucas, Patrick Dempsey and Candice Bergen.

His sister, Chris Eboch, is a children's author.

== Early life ==
Born in Chicago, Eboch would migrate to Saudi Arabia and later Alaska. He is a 1986 graduate of Juneau-Douglas High School in Juneau, Alaska; while attending JDHS he was very active in the drama department, appearing in plays such as Helen Keller.

== Career ==
Eboch wrote the original story for the 2002 film Sweet Home Alabama as his Masters thesis at the University of Southern California film school. The final film screenplay would be written by C. Jay Cox, and the film grossed $128 million domestically. Since then, he has worked as a "script doctor" and directed several short films. He was awarded the Carl Sautter Award as Best New Voice, Features.

Outside of film, he also wrote the children's Christmas play Sleepover at the Stable..., as well as the video game Night Cove. He teaches at several schools and institutions such as the University of Southern California and the Art Center College of Design. In 2016, he wrote a self-published screenwriting manual entitled The Three Stages of Screenwriting. He also wrote The Hollywood Pitching Bible, a self-published guide on how to pitch a film project, with Ken Aguado.
