= Mason Ewing =

Cameroonian fashion designer

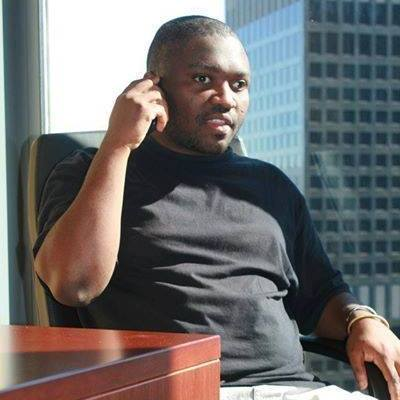
- Ewing in his office in Los Angeles, 2016
- Born: Mason Cyrille Elong Ewing; April 9, 1982 (age 44); Douala, Cameroon
- Occupations: Founder CEO of Mason Ewing Corporation, producer, stylist
- Years active: 2011–present
- Known for: cinema, fashion
- Awards: 100 People Influential (2018)

Mason Cyrille Elong Ewing (born April 9, 1982) is a French, Cameroonian and American producer, director, scriptwriter and fashion designer living in France and the United States. Ewing is blind.

== Biography ==
=== Early life ===
Ewing was born in Douala, the economic capital of Cameroon. His father, Frederik Ewing, is an American businessman who died in November 2010. Mason lived until age four with his Cameroonian mother, Marie Francesca Elong, who was a model and seamstress. She inspired him and gave him a taste for fashion. Ewing spent a lot of time with her as she made clothes for her children. His mother died in March 1986.

His great-grandmother Élise then took care of him for three years. In 1989, he moved to the Paris region where he lived with his uncle and aunt Lucien and Jeannette Ekwalla, where he suffered extreme child abuse. Not only was he locked in a room for eight years and beaten, but also chili pepper was thrown in his eyes for a number of years. In 1993, he often ran away to seek help from the police and judges, asking to be removed from the care of his uncle and aunt.

=== Career ===
Alongside his fashion projects, Ewing works on film projects in France and the U.S. He created the children's series The Adventures of Madison highlighting Baby Madison and the Mickey Boom series. In 2011, he moved to America to become a film producer. His holding company, Mason Ewing Corporation, in Los Angeles has various projects in film and TV production. He wrote a television series Eryna Bella and produced Descry, a short film.

Starting in April 2015, his French subsidiary Les Entreprises Ewing, subsidiary of Mason Ewing Corporation is based in Clichy, France. He is a member of the French production trade union UPC.

After living in Los Angeles for a few years, he returned to France to focus on his work with Mickey Boom, supported by French and international channels.

In 2019, Ewing produced the romantic comedy film Love in Yaoundé.

=== Legal issues ===
In March 2025, Le Parisien reported that Ewing had been accused of sexual offences dating from 2009 by multiple young men who had sought to work with him. A preliminary police investigation in Meaux was open as of June 2025. Ewing denies the allegations. As of April 2026, the investigation was ongoing.

== Awards ==
In 2018, Ewing was awarded the A.I.M. Award by Afrimpact Magazine in Pennsylvania for his community work. For many years he has supported the Association for the Blind and Visually Impaired and the Le Comité Contre l'Esclavage Moderne. He is also an Ambassador for the Humanity & Inclusion NGO and the Le Refuge association for youths LGBTQ+ at risk. He is supported by the Secretary of State for Child Protection Adrien Taquet.

== Filmography ==
=== Feature film ===
- Love in Yaounde (release planned in 2019)

=== Short film ===
- 2011: Descry
- 2017: Névroses
- 2017: Comme Les Autres
- 2017: Le Plus Beau Cadeau de ma Mère
