= Allied Artists =

Allied Artists may refer to:

- Allied Artists Pictures Corporation the historic movie company which started as Monogram Pictures and continued until the 1970s
- Allied Artists International, formerly Allied Artists Records
