= Mason Ewing Corporation =

California-based holding company

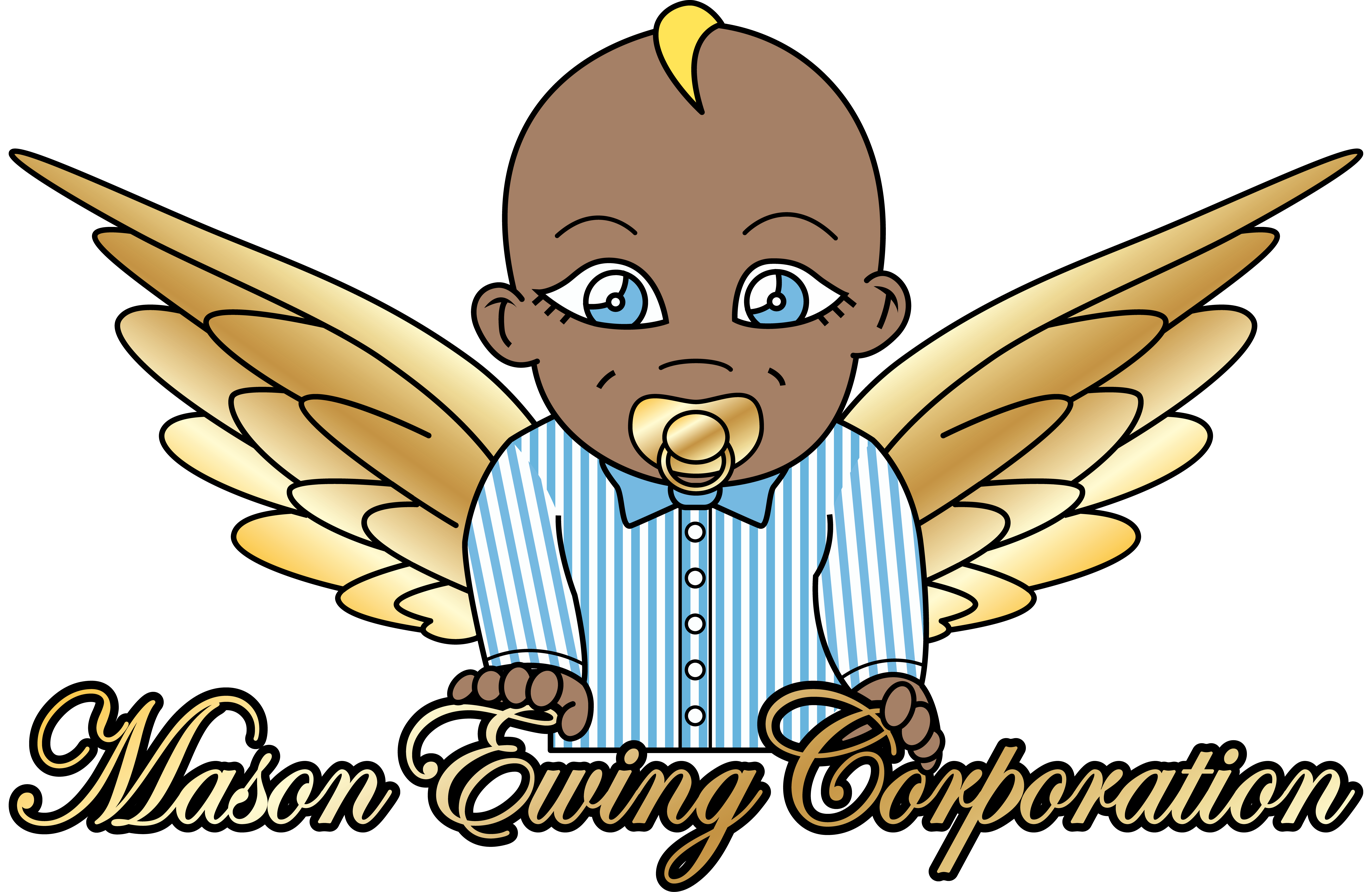
- Type: Corporation
- Industry: Fashion, Audiovisual
- Founded: 2011
- Founder: Mason Ewing
- Headquarters: 14033 Burbank Boulevard, Los Angeles, US
- Subsidiaries: Mason Ewing Corporation (Canada), Les Entreprises Ewing (France); Ewingwood (Cameroon)
- Website: masonewingcorp.com

Mason Ewing Corporation is a holding company based in Los Angeles and headed by Mason Ewing, who founded it in 2011. The corporation targets mainly the fashion, cinema, and music industries, but also various other sectors such as cosmetics and chocolate.

The enterprise has various subsidiaries in several countries like Mason Ewing Corporation (Canada), Les Entreprises Ewing (France), and Ewingwood (Cameroon).

== History ==
An additional branch in China was opened in 2018.

The opening of the Administrative council was scheduled in 2017.

== Industries ==
=== Fashion ===
The house of couture Mason Ewing is a subsidiary branch of Mason Ewing Corporation. It was created by Mason Ewing a few years prior to the holding opening. Lines include:

•A t-shirt line with Braille writing. Mason Ewing, himself blind, conceived of these to enable wearers to be aware of their colours, to be able to dress without assistance. On the shirts in this line, a baby is shown engaging in different activities (on a skateboard, on a BMX, with a guitar). Braille is appended on clothing describing the baby's activity. 5% of all proceeds are given to the Sos Madison International association.

•A line of haute couture created by Ewing to honour his mother Marie, herself a seamstress, stylist and model artist. The Espoir Pour l'Avenir collection had appeared on runways in France (Eurosites on Georges V), Canada (hotel Hilton de Gatineau), Cameroon (hotel Hilton of Yaounde), Saint Martin (election of Miss Caribbean), and Martinique.

• An underwear collection for women, Elisa Charnel (featured simultaneously with Espoir Pour l'Avenir).

=== Audiviosual ===
The footage Descry boosted the audiovisual aspect. Since then, this branch has created animation movies such as Les Aventures de Madison, starring baby Madison and his friend Johan. This was followed by the adventures of Pilou et Michou, a TV show for kids which focused on life in the 18th century. Pilou is a mindless 17-year-old young man living with his mom Cunégonde as well as his grandmother Michou.

Aside from the animations targeted for kids, the Mason Ewing Corporation has produced TV series for teenagers. These include Mickey Boom, produced by the French subsidiary, Eryna Bella, produced in Los Angeles, and Two Plus Three, also produced in L.A. Angels of the World that will be filmed in the United States.

Loyal to his background, Mason Ewing produced a movie called Orishas, The Hidden Pantheon, directed by Yann Loïc Kieffoloh, which draws from the esoteric mythology of West African countries. It was scheduled for release in 2017.

In 2017 the corporation began filming Elie Grimm, The Cursed Child, the first part of its horror trilogy.

=== Literature ===
In 2016, Mason Ewing Corporation Canada teamed up with Lecompte-Jeunesse publishing to publish children's books and audiobooks.

Starting in January 2017 the corporation began publishing a magazine called Kimy Gloss. It focuses on celebrities, cosmetics, and actor/model castings.

== Filmography ==
- 2011 : Descry
- 2016 : Orishas : The Hidden Pantheon
- 2017 : Névroses
- 2017 : Comme Les Autres

=== Audiovisual ===
- 2020 : Une Lueur d'Espoir
- 2020 : Mickey Boom
- 2020 : Love in Yaounde
- 2021 : Elie Grimm : The Cursed Child
