= Sweet Home Alabama (film) =

2002 American romantic comedy-drama film

- Theatrical release poster
- Directed by: Andy Tennant
- Screenplay by: C. Jay Cox
- Story by: Douglas J. Eboch
- Produced by: Neal H. Moritz; Stokely Chaffin
- Starring: Reese Witherspoon; Josh Lucas; Patrick Dempsey; Fred Ward; Mary Kay Place; Jean Smart; Candice Bergen
- Cinematography: Andrew Dunn
- Edited by: Troy Takaki; Tracey Wadmore-Smith
- Music by: George Fenton
- Production companies: Touchstone Pictures; Original Film
- Distributed by: Buena Vista Pictures Distribution
- Release date: September 27, 2002 (United States)
- Running time: 109 minutes
- Country: United States
- Language: English
- Budget: $30 million
- Box office: $180.6 million

Sweet Home Alabama is a 2002 American romantic comedy film directed by Andy Tennant. Written by C. Jay Cox, it stars Reese Witherspoon, Josh Lucas and Patrick Dempsey. The supporting cast includes Fred Ward, Mary Kay Place, Jean Smart, Candice Bergen, Ethan Embry, and Melanie Lynskey. The film takes its title from Lynyrd Skynyrd's 1974 song of the same name.

Young woman Melanie has reinvented herself as a New York City socialite, but must return home to Alabama to obtain a divorce from her husband Jake, who she grew up with, after seven years of separation.

The film was released in the United States on September 27, 2002, by Buena Vista Pictures through their Touchstone Pictures banner. Although it received unfavorable critical reception, it was a success at the box office.

== Plot ==
On a beach in Pigeon Creek, Alabama, 10-year-olds Jake Perry and Melanie Smooter inspect the result of lightning striking sand. He asserts they are soulmates who will be married.

In the present, Melanie is a New York fashion designer using the surname "Carmichael" to hide her poor Southern roots. After wealthy Andrew Hennings proposes, Melanie returns to Pigeon Creek to announce her engagement to her parents, Earl and Pearl Smooter, and finalize her divorce from estranged husband Jake, whom she married as a pregnant teenager and left after she miscarried. Meanwhile, Kate Hennings, Andrew's mother and the Mayor of New York City, doubts Melanie's suitability for her son, whom she is grooming to run as U.S. President.

Melanie visits Jake, who has long avoided signing their divorce papers. After Jake orders Melanie out of the house, she empties Jake's considerable checking account, hoping to spur him into ending the marriage. Angry, Jake goes to the local bar. Melanie follows and gets drunk, insults her old schoolmates, and outs her longtime friend, Bobby Ray Bailey. Jake scolds Melanie and takes her home to her parents, preventing her from driving inebriated; Melanie wakes to find the signed divorce papers on her bed.

Melanie goes to the Carmichael plantation and apologizes to Bobby Ray. Kate's assistant, Barry Lowenstein, sent to gather information on Melanie's background, unexpectedly arrives posing as a New York Post reporter. Bobby Ray backs up Melanie's pretense that she is related and the family mansion is her childhood home.

After reuniting with friends, Melanie learns that after their split, Jake followed her to New York to win her back. Intimidated by the city and her success, he returned home to make something of himself first. After a heart-to-heart with Jake, Melanie realizes why he never signed their divorce papers.

Andrew arrives to surprise Melanie, but upon discovering her true background and marriage, he angrily leaves. He soon returns to apologize and the wedding is set into motion. Melanie's New York friends arrive. While visiting a restaurant/resort with a glassblowing gallery, they admire its glass sculptures. Melanie realizes that Jake is the artist and owns the resort.

During Melanie and Andrew's wedding at the Carmichael estate, Melanie's attorney, Wallace Buford, arrives to stop the ceremony, declaring Melanie never signed the divorce papers. Realizing she still loves Jake, Melanie does not sign and cancels the wedding. She and Andrew wish each other well, though Kate berates Melanie and insults Pearl. Melanie punches Kate before rushing off to search for Jake.

Melanie finds him at the beach planting lightning rods in the sand to create more glass sculptures. She informs him they are still married. The couple celebrate with friends and family back at the bar and have their first dance as husband and wife.

A mid-credits sequence shows that they have a baby daughter, Melanie continues to thrive as a designer, and Jake opens a "Deep South Glass" franchise in New York. Andrew becomes engaged to Erin Vanderbilt.

== Cast ==
- Reese Witherspoon as Melanie Carmichael (née Smooter)
  - Dakota Fanning as young Melanie
- Josh Lucas as Jake Perry
  - Thomas Curtis as young Jake
- Patrick Dempsey as Andrew Hennings
- Fred Ward as Earl Smooter
- Mary Kay Place as Pearl Smooter
- Jean Smart as Stella Kay Perry
- Ethan Embry as Bobby Ray Bailey
- Melanie Lynskey as Lurlynn
- Courtney Gains as Sheriff Wade
- Mary Lynn Rajskub as Dorothea
- Rhona Mitra as Tabatha Wadmore-Smith
- Nathan Lee Graham as Frederick Montana
- Candice Bergen as Kate Hennings
- Kevin Sussman as Barry Lowenstein
- Katharine Towne as Erin Vanderbilt

== Release ==
=== Critical response ===
This film received mostly negative reviews from critics. On Rotten Tomatoes, the film holds a critical score of 38% based on 160 reviews, with an average rating of 5.19/10. The site's critics consensus reads: "Reese Witherspoon is charming enough, but the road to Alabama is well-traveled." At Metacritic, the film has a weighted average score of 45 out of 100 based on 35 critics, indicating "mixed or average reviews". Audiences polled by CinemaScore gave the film an average grade of "A–" on an A+ to F scale.

Roger Ebert, critic for the Chicago Sun Times, awarded it three out of four stars, commenting, "It is a fantasy, a sweet, light-hearted fairy tale with Reese Witherspoon at its center. She is as lovable as Doris Day would have been in this role... So I enjoyed Witherspoon and the local color, but I am so very tired of the underlying premise." Bill Muller of The Arizona Republic said, "Using her blond, blue-eyed pout to full advantage, Witherspoon is just as likable as a Southern belle as she was as a California sorority girl in Legally Blonde." Andrew Sarris, critic for the New York Observer, said that the movie "Would be an unendurable viewing experience for this ultra-provincial New Yorker if 26-year-old Reese Witherspoon were not on hand to inject her pure fantasy character, Melanie Carmichael, with a massive infusion of old-fashioned Hollywood magic."

=== Box office performance ===
The film grossed over US$35 million in its first weekend, ranking number one at the box office, beating The Tuxedo and Barbershop. At the time, it had the highest September opening weekend, surpassing Rush Hour. For a decade, the film would hold this record until 2012 when Hotel Transylvania took it. Despite getting dethroned by Red Dragon, it still made $21.3 million during its second weekend. By the end of its run in the United States, Sweet Home Alabama grossed over US$130 million, and another US$53,399,006 internationally. With a reported budget of US$30 million, it was a box office hit, despite the mixed reviews.

=== Home media ===
Sweet Home Alabama was released on VHS and DVD on February 4, 2003, it was released on Blu-ray on November 6, 2012, as part of its 10th anniversary. It sold 2 million DVD copies on its first day of release, and sold 7.40 million copies earning a profit of over $128.7 million.

=== Awards and accolades ===
Association	Category	Recipient	Result	Ref(s).
BMI Film & Television Award	BMI Film Music Award	George Fenton	Won	
GLAAD Media Award	Outstanding Film — Wide Release	Sweet Home Alabama	Nominated	
Hollywood Makeup Artist and Hair Stylist Guild Award	Best Contemporary Hair Styling — Feature	Anne Morgan	Nominated	
MTV Movie + TV Award	Best Female Performance	Reese Witherspoon	Nominated	
Teen Choice Award	Choice Movie – Comedy	Sweet Home Alabama	Won	
Teen Choice Award	Choice Movie Actress – Comedy	Reese Witherspoon	Nominated	
Teen Choice Award	Choice Movie Villain	Candice Bergen	Nominated	
Teen Choice Award	Choice Movie Liplock	Reese Witherspoon & Josh Lucas	Won	

== Soundtrack ==
Sweet Home Alabama (Original Motion Picture Soundtrack), the film soundtrack, includes thirteen songs by different artists.

No.	Title	Writer(s)	Performer(s)	Length
1.	"Sweet Home Alabama"	Gary Rossington, Ronnie Van Zant, Edward King	Jewel	3:43
2.	"Mine All Mine"	Kristyn Osborn, Hollie Poole	SHeDAISY	3:55
3.	"Falling Down"	Avril Lavigne, David Alspach, Lauren Christy, Graham Edwards	Avril Lavigne	3:54
4.	"Gonna Make You Love Me"	Ryan Adams	Ryan Adams	2:36
5.	"To Think I Used to Love You (DJ Homicide Remix)"	Uncle Kracker	Uncle Kracker	3:26
6.	"Keep Your Hands to Yourself"	Daniel J. Baird	The Calling	3:06
7.	"Bring On the Day"	Amy Powers, Jeffrey C.J. Vanston	Charlotte Martin	4:33
8.	"Long Gone Lonesome Blues"	Hank Williams	Sheryl Crow	2:55
9.	"You Got Me"	Jason Chain	Jason Chain	3:44
10.	"Now That I Know"	Eric Bazilian, Shannon McNally	Shannon McNally	4:44
11.	"Marry Me"	Dolly Parton	Dolly Parton	3:15
12.	"Weekend Song"	Matt Cantor, Pete Chill, Aston Harvey, Tenor Fly	Freestylers	3:58
13.	"Felony Melanie - Sweet Home Alabama Suite (Score)"	George Fenton	George Fenton	5:02
Total length:				48:51

== See also ==
- The Judge—a 2014 film with a similar plot of a protagonist with a successful big city career drawn back to an old hometown.
- Middle America
