= Guinevere (1999 film) =

1999 film directed by Audrey Wells

- Theatrical release poster
- Directed by: Audrey Wells
- Written by: Audrey Wells
- Produced by: Jonathan King; Brad Weston
- Starring: Stephen Rea; Sarah Polley; Jean Smart; Gina Gershon
- Cinematography: Charles Minsky
- Edited by: Dody Dorn
- Music by: Christophe Beck; Mikael Sandgren
- Production companies: Millennium Films; Bandeira Entertainment
- Distributed by: Miramax Films
- Release date: January 1999 (Sundance)
- Running time: 104 minutes
- Country: United States
- Language: English
- Box office: $632,283

Guinevere is a 1999 American drama film about the artistic and romantic relationship between a young student and her older mentor.

The film was written and directed by Audrey Wells (in her directorial debut) and stars Stephen Rea, Sarah Polley, Jean Smart, and Gina Gershon. The film was a 1999 Sundance Film Festival Jury Prize nominee. It won the Waldo Salt Screenwriting Award for Wells' screenplay, which she tied with Frank Whaley's script for Joe the King. It was also entered into the 21st Moscow International Film Festival.

== Plot ==
Harper Sloane is a misfit in her snobbish, upper-class family of lawyers. She has just been accepted to Harvard Law School. At her sister's wedding, after being sent out from her hiding place in the storage room with a bottle of champagne, she meets Connie Fitzpatrick, a bohemian photographer who takes an instant liking to her and nicknames her "Guinevere". Her visit to his loft in order to pick up the wedding photographs soon blossoms into a full-blown affair, and Harper eventually moves in with Connie as he instructs her in the ways of art, in particular photography.

After a brutal confrontation with Harper's mother, Deborah, and Harper's discovery that Connie has a history of relationships with young women, the film comes to a climax in a downtrodden L.A. hotel where Connie ends the relationship by kicking out Harper. She returns only once, four years later, as he is dying from cirrhosis of the liver, and meets the other Guineveres he has had. On the rooftop, she describes her personal view of his kind of heaven, which she affectionately titles "The Connie Special".

== Cast ==
- Stephen Rea as Connie Fitzpatrick
- Sarah Polley as Harper Sloane
- Jean Smart as Deborah Sloane
- Gina Gershon as Billie
- Paul Dooley as Walter
- Carrie Preston as Patty
- Tracy Letts as Zack
- Emily Procter as Susan Sloane
- Sharon McNight as Leslie (as Sharon Mcnight)
- Gedde Watanabe as Ed
- Carlton Wilborn as Jay
- Sandra Oh as Cindy
- Jasmine Guy as Linda

== Production ==
Guinevere was part of a broader co-production and distribution agreement between Miramax Films and Millennium Films, which was announced in August 1997. Millennium Films was established in early 1996 as a subsidiary of Nu Image, who intended to use it to produce higher-end films distinct from their earlier low-budget, direct-to-video projects. The film Break Up (1998) was the first project under the Miramax/Millennium partnership. It allowed for up to four co-productions annually, with Miramax handling distribution in English-speaking territories (except South Africa) and Nu Image handling foreign sales.

=== Shooting ===
With the exception of some exterior shots in the Pacific Heights neighborhood of San Francisco, the film was mostly shot in Los Angeles.

== Reception ==
Guinevere received positive reviews, resulting an approval rating of 86% based on 35 reviews on the critics website Rotten Tomatoes. Metacritic, which uses a weighted average, assigned the film a score of 67 out of 100, based on 25 critics, indicating "generally favorable" reviews.

Lisa Schwarzbaum of Entertainment Weekly wrote, "This patient, perceptive, nonjudgmental love story about age difference is the first to convincingly explain the temporal physics of May–December romances. That writer-director Audrey Wells (who wrote The Truth About Cats & Dogs) promotes the feminine point of view makes this incisive romantic drama all the more valuable. It’s the truth about men and girls."

Edward Guthmann of the San Francisco Chronicle opined the film is "a quiet character drama that illustrates the fragility of early love and the pain of a trust betrayed. Don't expect sitcom zingers, over mixed rock music or any other Hollywood youth-movie cliches -- this is a movie that disarms with its sincerity and frankness."

Much praise was given to Sarah Polley, with Janet Maslin of The New York Times wrote, "Ms. Polley in particular captures the full emotional range of a young woman trying on the mantle of a Guinevere." Kenneth Turan of the Los Angeles Times said Polley keeps the film and her character from falling into clichés.

Marjorie Baumgarten of The Austin Chronicle noted the film occasionally "bogs down during several fuzzily romantic interludes", but "the twist on this story makes for interesting viewing." She added, "As with her screenplay for The Truth About Cats and Dogs, Wells takes some old clichés about the sexes (in Truth, it was the conflict between beautiful and plain-looking women) and turns them inside out."

== Awards and nominations ==
Award	Category	Nominee	Result	Ref.
Deauville American Film Festival	Jury Special Prize	Audrey Wells	Won	
Deauville American Film Festival	Grand Special Prize	Audrey Wells	Nominated	
Independent Spirit Awards	Best Supporting Female	Jean Smart	Nominated	
Independent Spirit Awards	Best Screenplay	Audrey Wells	Nominated	
Moscow International Film Festival	Golden St. George	Audrey Wells	Nominated	
Sundance Film Festival	Waldo Salt Screenwriting Award	Audrey Wells	Won (Note: Shared with Frank Whaley for Joe the King)	
Sundance Film Festival	Grand Jury Prize - Dramatic Feature	Audrey Wells	Nominated	

== Home media and rights ==
In the United States, it was released on VHS and DVD on March 14, 2000 by Buena Vista Home Entertainment (under the Miramax Home Entertainment banner).

In December 2010, Miramax was sold by The Walt Disney Company, their owners since 1993. That same month, the studio was taken over by private equity firm Filmyard Holdings. In 2011, Filmyard Holdings licensed the Miramax library to streamer Netflix. This streaming deal included Guinevere, and ran for five years, eventually ending on June 1, 2016.

Filmyard Holdings sold Miramax to Qatari company beIN Media Group in March 2016. In April 2020, ViacomCBS (now known as Paramount Skydance) acquired the rights to Miramax's library, after buying a 49% stake in the studio from beIN. Guinevere is among the 700 titles they acquired in the deal, and since April 2020, the film has been distributed by Paramount Pictures.
