= Call Me Izzy =

2025 play by Jamie Wax

- 2025 Broadway production poster
- Original language: English
- Written by: Jamie Wax
- Characters: Izzy
- Genre: Drama

Premiere
- Date: June 12, 2025
- Place: Studio 54, Broadway
- Directed by: Sarna Lapine

Call Me Izzy is the debut stage play by American playwright Jamie Wax, which premiered on Broadway at Studio 54 in 2025, starring Jean Smart. The one-actor play follows a creative woman who hides her passion for writing from her abusive husband. For his writing, Wax was nominated for the 2026 Outer Critics Circle John Gassner Award.

== Plot ==
The one-woman play follows Izzy, a creative writer in rural Louisiana hiding her passion for poetry from her abusive husband, forced to write on toilet paper in the bathroom with an eyebrow pencil. As she longs for freedom, she remarks on the cost of following your dreams and the barriers that prevent you from doing so.

== Production history ==
The play premiered on Broadway in 2025 as Wax's playwriting debut, with Sarna Lapine as director and Jean Smart in the lead role as Izzy. The production opened at Studio 54 on May 24, 2025, running through August 24, 2025 after an extension. The production received generally positive reviews, with praise for Smart's performance. The New York Times praised her performance as a "triumph" and the script as an effective blend of "old-fashioned floweriness and deep-dish pathos." Additionally Deadline lauded the production as "remarkable," while The New York Post criticized it as "dull and unchallenging." Nonetheless, the production received two Outer Critics Circle Award nominations, for both Smart and Wax.

On July 8, 2025, Smart sustained a knee injury that halted the production due to her inability to perform. Actress Johanna Day was announced to perform the role from July 8 through July 11, but the end date was later extended to July 18 for further recovery time. She would eventually return on July 22, 2025 and the production was extended through August 24, 2025.

== Cast and character ==
Character	Broadway 2025
Izzy	Jean Smart

== Awards and nominations ==
Year	Award	Category	Work	Result	Ref.
2026	Outer Critics Circle Award	John Gassner Award	Jamie Wax	Nominated	
2026	Outer Critics Circle Award	Outstanding Solo Performance	Jean Smart	Nominated	
