= Jean Smart =

American actress (born 1951)

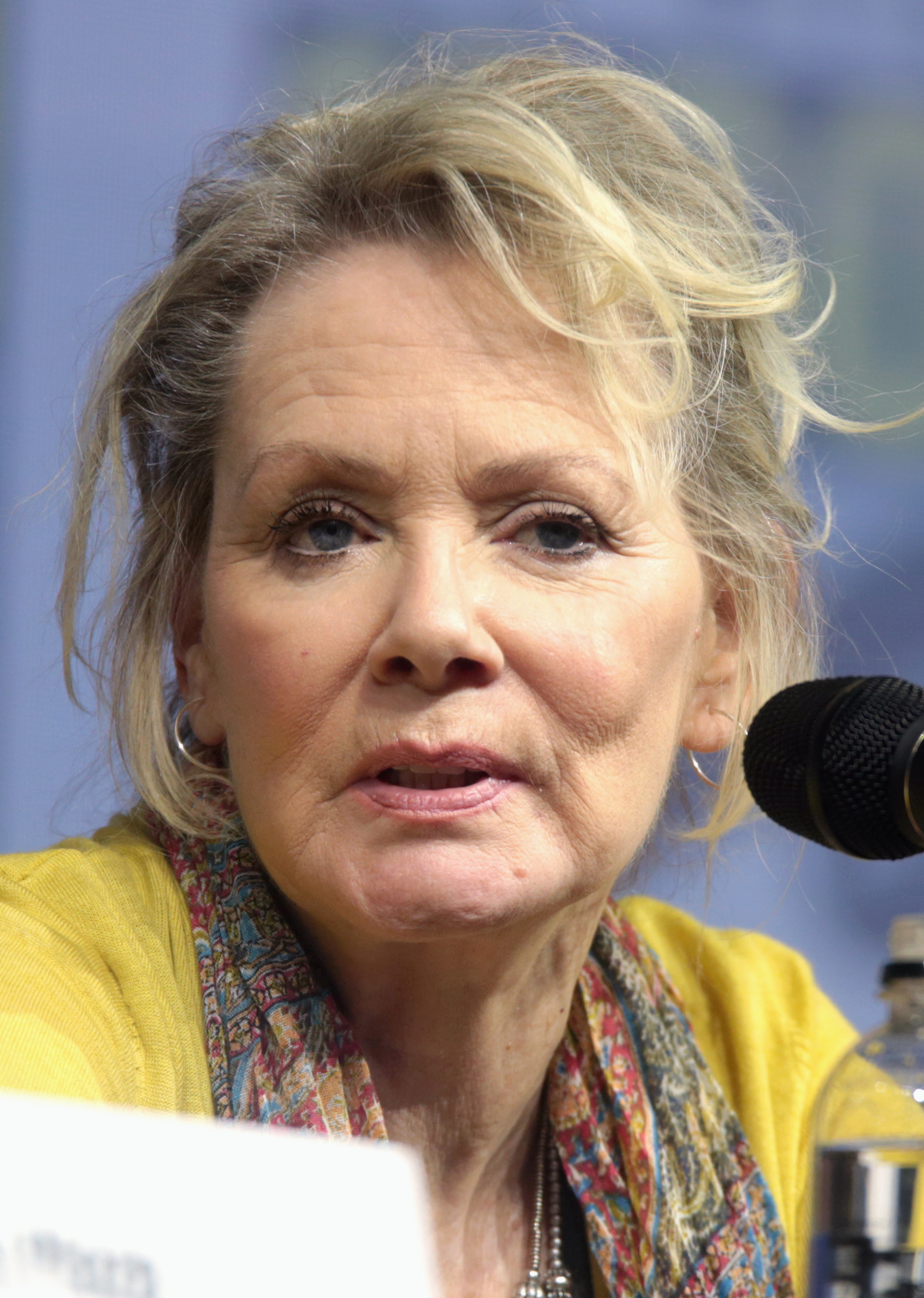
- Smart in 2018
- Born: Jean Elizabeth Smart; September 13, 1951 (age 75); Seattle, Washington, U.S.
- Education: University of Washington (BFA)
- Occupation: Actress
- Years active: 1975–present
- Works: Full list
- Spouse: Richard Gilliland (m. 1987; died 2021)
- Children: 2
- Awards: Full list

Jean Elizabeth Smart (born September 13, 1951) is an American actress. Her work includes both comedy and drama, and her accolades include eight Emmy Awards, three Actor Awards and three Golden Globe Awards, with nominations for a Grammy Award and a Tony Award.

Smart first gained prominence for her leading role as Charlene Frazier Stillfield on the CBS sitcom Designing Women, in which she starred from 1986 to 1991. She went on to win eight Primetime Emmy Awards for her roles as Lana Gardner in the NBC series Frasier (2000–2001), Regina Newley in the ABC sitcom Samantha Who? (2007–2009), and Deborah Vance in the HBO Max comedy series Hacks (2021–2026). She was Emmy-nominated for her roles in The District (2000–2004), 24 (2006–2007), Harry's Law (2011), Fargo (2015), Watchmen (2019), and Mare of Easttown (2021). She also acted in FX's Legion (2017–2019) and voiced Ann Possible in the Disney Channel animated series Kim Possible (2002–2007).

Smart's film credits include Flashpoint (1984), The Brady Bunch Movie (1995), Sweet Home Alabama (2002), Garden State (2004), I Heart Huckabees (2004), Youth in Revolt (2009), The Accountant (2016), A Simple Favor (2018), and Babylon (2022). She received an Independent Spirit Award nomination for playing the mother of a rebellious student in the drama Guinevere (1999).

On stage, she made her Broadway debut portraying Marlene Dietrich in the biographical play Piaf (1981). She starred in the revival of the George S. Kaufman and Moss Hart play The Man Who Came to Dinner (2000), for which she was nominated for the Tony Award for Best Actress in a Play. She returned to Broadway in the one-woman play Call Me Izzy (2025).

== Early life and education ==
Smart was born and raised in Seattle, Washington, the daughter of Kathleen Marie "Kay" (née Sanders) and Douglas Alexander Smart, a teacher. She is the second of four children. Smart was diagnosed with type 1 diabetes when she was 13 years old. Her father was a second-generation Scottish-American. On season 10 of the television show Who Do You Think You Are?, Smart discovered she is a maternal descendant of Dorcas Hoar, one of the last women convicted of witchcraft during the Salem witch trials.

She is a 1969 graduate of Ballard High School in Seattle; there, she gained an interest in acting in the drama program. She graduated from the University of Washington Professional Actors Training Program with a Bachelor of Fine Arts.

== Career ==
=== 1975–1999: Theater roles and Designing Women ===
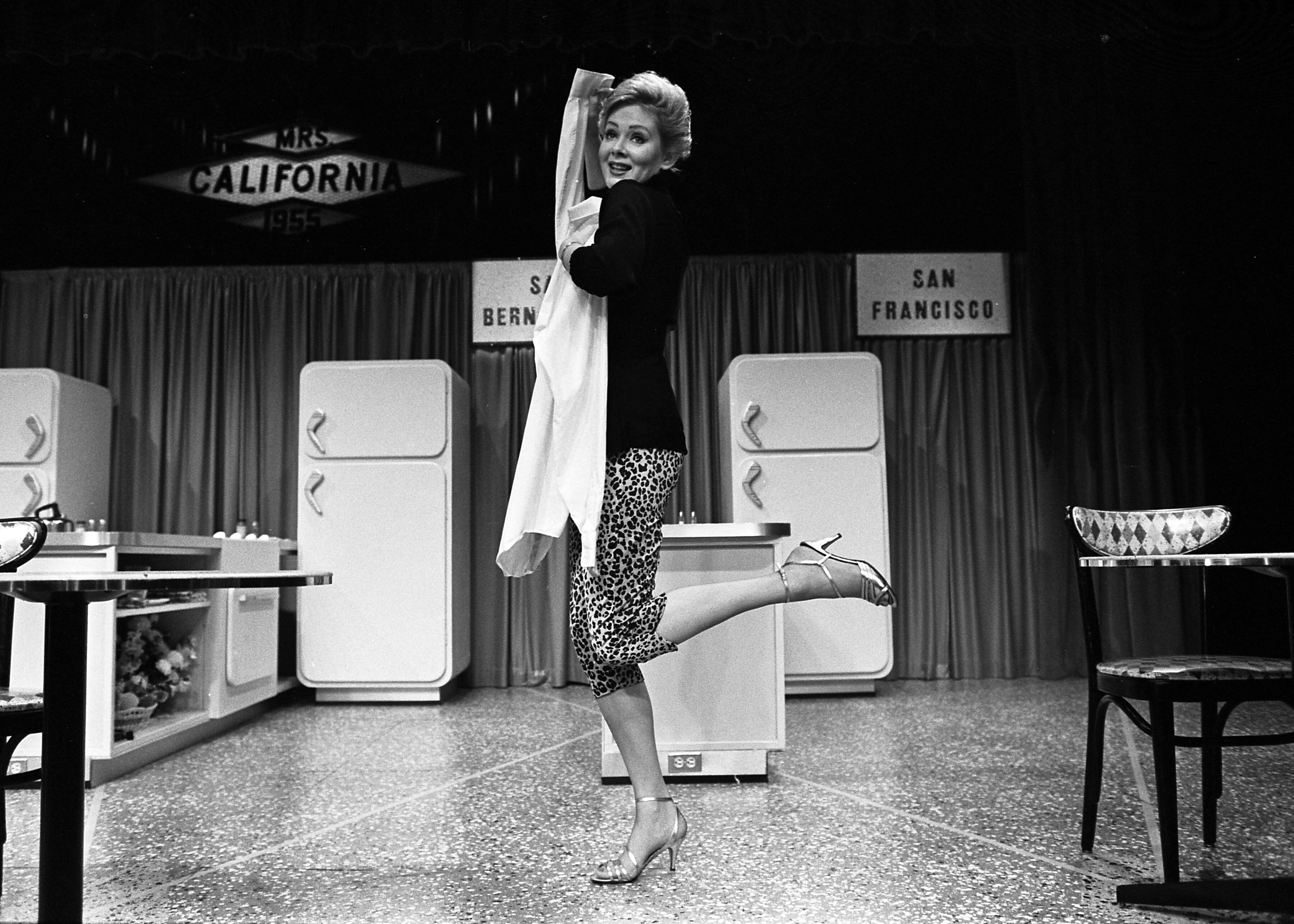
Smart in Mrs. California at Los Angeles Public Theatre

After graduating from college, Smart began her career appearing in regional theater throughout the Pacific Northwest, including in Washington, Alaska, and Oregon. She performed with the Seattle Repertory Theater, as well as the Oregon Shakespeare Festival in Ashland, Oregon. In the mid-1970s, she moved to New York City with college friend and fellow actress, Elizabeth Wingate (Lavery), and began working in off-Broadway and professional regional productions. In 1980, she appeared as Lady Macbeth at the Pittsburgh Public Theater opposite Tom Atkins as Macbeth and Keith Fowler as Macduff. In 1981, Smart was nominated for a Drama Desk Award for her performance in the off-Broadway play Last Summer at Bluefish Cove. In February 1981, Smart appeared in the Broadway production of Piaf playing Marlene Dietrich, a role which she later reprised for the 1984 television version.

In addition to theater, Smart began working in television in several smaller to midsized guest parts in the late 1970s and early 1980s, appearing on The Facts of Life, Alice, and Remington Steele, among several others. According to Smart, after roles on the short-lived series Teachers Only and Reggie in 1983, "casting directors just decided I was funny. When that happens, you usually get pigeonholed, but I was fortunate. I got to move back and forth." The following year, she had a supporting part in the thriller Flashpoint (1984).

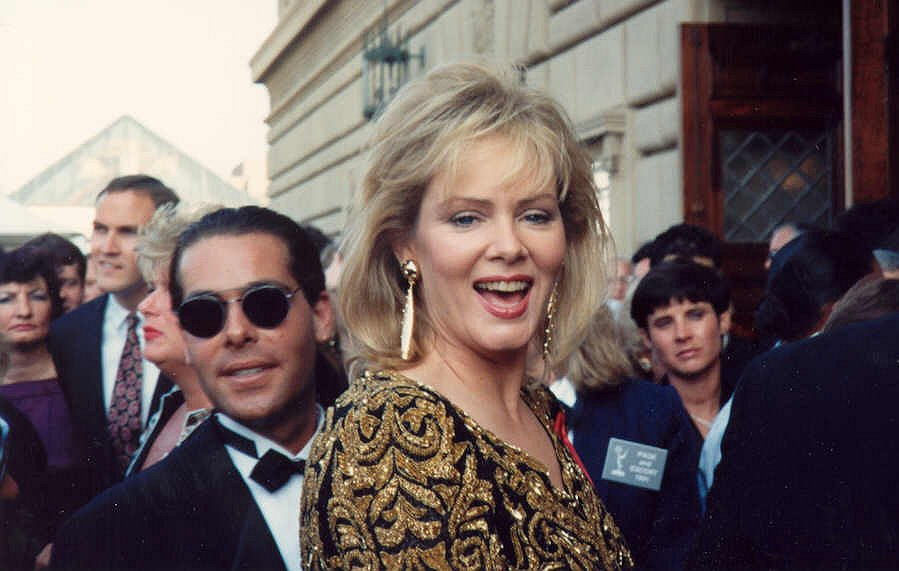
Smart at the 1991 Primetime Emmy Awards ceremony

In 1985, Smart was cast in the starring role of Charlene Frazier Stillfield on the comedy series Designing Women, a role she played from the show's beginning in 1986 through its fifth season. After leaving Designing Women, her work mainly concentrated on made-for-television films and supporting film roles. Notably, she portrayed serial killer Aileen Wuornos in the television film Overkill: The Aileen Wuornos Story (1992), followed by a supporting part in the black comedy Mistress (1992), opposite Robert De Niro and Eli Wallach. Critic Roger Ebert praised the film and called Smart's character portrayal "calculating". The following year, she appeared in the family drama Homeward Bound: The Incredible Journey (1993), and as Ory Baxter in a television version of The Yearling (1994). She was then cast as Sally Brewton in the television miniseries Scarlett (1995), and appeared in a supporting role in The Brady Bunch Movie (1995). She also appeared in the television thriller film A Stranger In Town (1995) opposite Gregory Hines.

In 1995, Smart was cast as the lead in the comedy series High Society, which co-starred Mary McDonnell and ran for 13 episodes, followed by a role opposite Nancy McKeon in another short-lived CBS sitcom, Style & Substance. Her other roles included a part in Neil Simon's The Odd Couple II (1998) and as Deborah Sloane in the drama Guinevere (1999). She had a lead role in the comedy Forever Fabulous (1999) as an aging beauty queen.

=== 2000–2019: Television roles and acclaim ===
In 2000, Smart was cast as Lana Gardner in the critically acclaimed NBC comedy series Frasier, acting opposite Kelsey Grammer, set in her hometown of Seattle. She went on to win two Primetime Emmy Awards for Outstanding Guest Actress in a Comedy Series. Reflecting on the role, Smart said: "I had loved that role on Frasier so much, particularly that first episode. It's nice to get nominated and win for something you were particularly proud of. At the time, I was a little bit snobby about doing guest parts. Based on what, I don't know. It wasn't something I was seeking. But my agent said, 'You have to read this.' I thought it was hilarious, and the show was brilliant, so I didn't even hesitate. I remember when we did the table read with the rest of the cast, we could hardly get through it we were laughing so hard."

The same year, she was in the company of the second Broadway revival production of The Man Who Came to Dinner, which earned her a Tony Award nomination. Soon after, she landed roles in several high-profile films including Sweet Home Alabama (2002), playing the mother-in-law of Reese Witherspoon, and in the comedy Bringing Down The House (2002), opposite Queen Latifah. She also had a supporting role in the independent drama Garden State (2004). Between 2000 and 2004, Smart played the role of Supervisor of Detectives and ex-wife to Chief Jack Mannion of the Metropolitan Police Department on The District. From 2002 to 2007, she voiced Dr. Ann Possible in Kim Possible, and also provided the voice of the alcoholic chain-smoking, Pickles Oblong, on The Oblongs. In 2004, she reprised her voice role as Reba Heyerdahl in an episode of the Nickelodeon series Hey Arnold!. The same year, she was cast in a lead role in the short-lived Center of the Universe. She also had a supporting role in David O. Russell's I Heart Huckabees (2004).

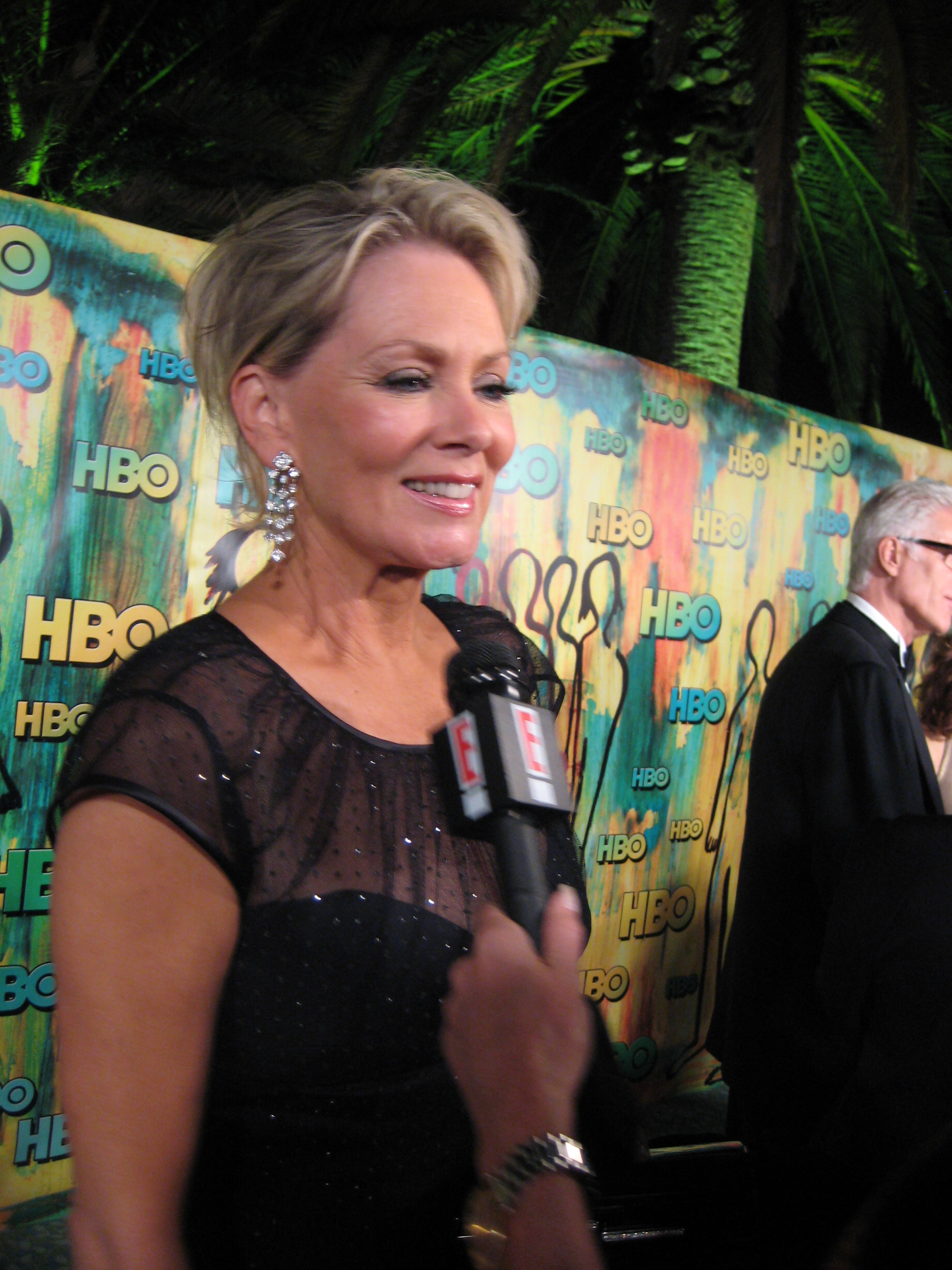
Smart after her Primetime Emmy Award win on September 21, 2008

In January 2006, Smart joined the cast of the Fox series 24, playing the mentally unstable First Lady of the United States, Martha Logan, to actor Gregory Itzin's President Charles Logan. She received back-to-back Emmy nominations for Outstanding Supporting Actress in a Drama Series and Outstanding Guest Actress in a Drama for the role in 2006 and 2007. She also appeared in several films between 2006 and 2010, including the Curtis Hanson drama, Lucky You (2007), opposite Drew Barrymore; Youth in Revolt (2009); and the independent comedy Barry Munday (2010). Smart won her third Emmy Award for Best Supporting Actress in a Comedy Series for portraying Samantha's overbearing mother in the sitcom Samantha Who?, opposite Christina Applegate, which she played from 2007 to 2009. She later was cast as Hawaii Governor Pat Jameson during the first season of the CBS-TV remake of Hawaii Five-0. In 2012, Smart was nominated for a Primetime Emmy Award for Outstanding Guest Actress in a Drama Series for her role in Harry's Law. She then had a supporting role in the Lifetime film Call Me Crazy: A Five Film (2013).

In 2015, Smart starred in the second season of the FX television series Fargo as Floyd Gerhardt. Floyd's husband heads Fargo's most prominent organized crime syndicate, and she is forced to take over after her husband suffers a debilitating stroke. She later finds herself having to lead the Gerhardt dynasty and deal with her sons, who are vying to replace their father. For her performance, Smart won the Critics' Choice Television Award for Best Supporting Actress in a Movie/Miniseries and was nominated for the Primetime Emmy Award for Outstanding Supporting Actress in a Limited Series or Movie. She worked with Hawley again on Legion, in which she played Melanie Bird, a therapist who works with the eponymous character. In 2016, Smart had a role in the thriller The Accountant, opposite Ben Affleck, Anna Kendrick, and John Lithgow. In 2018, Smart played a guardian angel, to co-star Candace Cameron, in the Hallmark Channel television film A Shoe Addict's Christmas, which aired Sunday November 25, 2018.

In 2019, Smart portrayed Laurie Juspeczyk, the former Silk Spectre, in the HBO superhero drama limited series Watchmen based on characters from the graphic novel of the same name. Smart's performance was singled out by critics including Eric Deggans of NPR who described her performance as "compelling" and "the always-excellent Jean Smart [playing] a cynical, heroically-damaged middle-aged version of Laurie Juspecyk." The series received critical acclaim, winning 11 Primetime Emmy Awards, including Outstanding Limited Series. Smart was nominated for Primetime Emmy Award for Outstanding Supporting Actress in a Limited Series or Movie and received the Critics' Choice Television Award for Best Supporting Actress in a Drama Series for her performance.

=== 2020–present: Hacks and return to Broadway ===
In 2021, Smart appeared in the seven-episode HBO crime drama limited series Mare of Easttown set in a small town in Pennsylvania. The series stars Kate Winslet as a grizzled detective with a supporting cast that includes Guy Pearce, Julianne Nicholson, and Evan Peters. Her role as Winslet's mother has earned her critical acclaim, with Jackson McHenry of Variety writing, "It's one of those essential truths of TV, as Watchmen and Legion displayed recently, that if you need a tough-as-nails broad, you hire Jean Smart. Smart has the voice and the timing to play a stern matriarch, and whenever she's onscreen in Mare of Easttown, she wrenches away the spotlight like she's grabbing a juice box."

She also stars as the lead in the HBO Max dark comedy series Hacks (2021–2026), playing a legendary Las Vegas comedy diva looking to appeal to a younger audience. USA Today declared Smart, at the age of 69, "The Queen of HBO", after appearing in Watchmen, Mare of Easttown, and now Hacks. Glen Weldon of NPR praised Smart's performance in his review, writing, "I don't know if the role of Deborah Vance was written for Smart, but she certainly makes it seem like it was...Smart's also convincing as a standup, performing Deborah's vaguely hokey routines with a naturalistic flair as if she was born to it." She won two consecutive Primetime Emmy Awards for Outstanding Lead Actress in a Comedy Series (in 2021 and 2022), followed by additional victories in 2024, 2025, and 2026. She is the first actress to win an Emmy for every season of a series that lasted more than two seasons (Hacks), and with eight Emmys, has tied the record for most Emmy wins for acting.

In 2021, Smart co-starred in the romantic comedy film Senior Moment with William Shatner and Christopher Lloyd. In 2022, she played Peg, the grandmother of Kiernan Shipka's character Bea Johnson, in Wildflower. In 2022, Smart appeared in Damien Chazelle's 1920s period comedy-drama film Babylon as gossip columnist Elinor St. John. On September 28, 2024, she hosted the season 50 premiere episode of Saturday Night Live. Zach Vasquez of The Guardian wrote of her hosting duties, "Smart is no slouch – a great dramatic and comedic actor of stage and screen, she nails her monologue, delivering jokes like the pro comic she plays on Hacks, before singing a rendition of Cole Porter’s "I Happen to Like New York."

Smart had a cameo role in the eighth episode of The Studio, which premiered on May 6, 2025.

Smart returned to Broadway in June 2025 in the one-woman play Call Me Izzy written by Jamie Wax at Studio 54.

== Personal life ==
=== Marriages and family ===
In 1974, Smart married John W. Norwalk, a Lieutenant in the U.S. Marine Corps. They later divorced.

Smart was married to actor Richard Gilliland for 33 years until his death in March 2021 after a brief illness. They met while working on the set of Designing Women (1986–93), where he played J.D. Shackelford, the boyfriend of Annie Potts's character, Mary Jo Shively. Smart also worked with her husband in season five of 24; he played Captain Stan Cotter in one episode, while she starred in the main cast role of First Lady Martha Logan.

They have two sons; they had their first child in 1989 and adopted their second in 2009. In a 2025 interview, Smart mentioned that she had a boyfriend, whom she called "a wonderful actor" without stating his name. Later, in 2026, Smart was seen with actor Joe Pacheco at the 83rd Golden Globes, and thanked him in her speech for her win for Best Actress – Television Series Musical or Comedy for Hacks.

=== Health ===
In February 2023, Smart underwent triple bypass heart surgery at Cedars-Sinai after feeling discomfort while shooting the third season of Hacks. Coincidentally, Hacks co-creator Paul W. Downs was accompanying his mother at the same hospital Smart was admitted, and accompanied Smart as she consulted with doctors before deciding to have surgery.

== Acting credits and accolades ==
She is the recipient of numerous awards, including eight Primetime Emmy Awards and nominations for a Tony Award and Grammy Award. Smart has been nominated for fourteen Primetime Emmy Awards for her work in television, winning eight times: twice for her comedic performance in a guest-starring role in Frasier (2000, 2001), once for her performance in Samantha Who? (2008), and five times for her performance in Hacks (2021, 2022, 2024, 2025, 2026). She was also nominated for the Tony Award for Best Actress in a Play for her performance in the Broadway revival of the George S. Kaufman play The Man Who Came to Dinner (2001). In 2016, Smart was nominated for the Grammy Award for Best Spoken Word Album for Patience and Sarah.

In 2000, she earned an Independent Spirit Award nomination for Guinevere and in 2007, she earned a Screen Actors Guild Award nomination along with the ensemble cast of the drama series 24. Smart consecutively won the Critics' Choice Television Award for Best Actress in a Comedy Series for Hacks in 2022 and 2023, and then once again in 2025. Smart is the most awarded performer at the Critics' Choice Television Awards, with five wins from six nominations. Smart is only the second actress, after Betty White, to win all three comedy Emmy nominations – comedy lead, supporting, and guest categories. She is also the first actress to win an Emmy for every season of a series that lasted more than two seasons (with Hacks), and with eight Emmys, has tied the record for most Emmy wins for acting.
