= Enigma Variations (TV series) =

Upcoming American television series

- Genre: Romance drama
- Created by: Amanda Kate Shuman
- Based on: Enigma Variations by André Aciman
- Directed by: Oliver Hermanus
- Starring: Aaron Taylor-Johnson; Alicia Vikander; Riley Keough; Devon Terrell; Carl Clemons-Hopkins; Nicholas Podany; Sarah Pidgeon; Peter Hermann; Juliana Canfield; Francesca Cavallin
- Country of origin: United States
- Original language: English

Production
- Executive producers: Amanda Kate Shuman; André Aciman; Oliver Hermanus; Christina Malach; Lindsey Springer; Michael Ellenberg; Monica Levinson
- Production company: Media Res

Original release
- Network: Netflix

Enigma Variations is an upcoming romance drama television miniseries starring Aaron Taylor-Johnson. It is an adaptation of the André Aciman novel of the same name.

== Premise ==
The series follows Paul, a sexually fluid man whose life is reshaped by his lovers who ignite and undo him across ten years.

== Cast ==
- Aaron Taylor-Johnson as Paul
- Alicia Vikander as Claire
- Riley Keough as Maud
- Devon Terrell as Manfred
- Carl Clemons-Hopkins as Noah
- Nicholas Podany as Harlan
- Sarah Pidgeon as Chloe
- Peter Hermann as Isaac
- Juliana Canfield as Allie
- Francesca Cavallin as Luciana

== Production ==
=== Development ===
The Netflix limited series is an adaptation of the novel of the same name by André Aciman who also executive produces. It has Amanda Kate Shuman as writer, executive producer and showrunner, with Oliver Hermanus as director and executive producer. Jeremy Allen White was set to exeuctive produce and star. Other executive producers include Michael Ellenberg and Monica Levinson via Media Res, Christina Malach, Lindsey Springer. In March 2026, it was announced that the series was ordered by Netflix and Aaron Taylor-Johnson had replaced White in the cast.

=== Casting ===
In June 2026, Alicia Vikander was cast opposite Taylor-Johnson. In July 2026, it was announced that Riley Keough, Devon Terrell, Carl Clemons-Hopkins and Nicholas Podany joined the series. In August 2026, Sarah Pidgeon, Peter Hermann, Juliana Canfield, Francesca Cavallin joined the series.

=== Filming ===
Production took place in Cliffside Park and Westfield, New Jersey, while Taylor-Johnson and Terrell were photographed during a shoot in Manhattan, New York.
