= Enigma Variations (novel) =

2017 novel by André Aciman

- Author: André Aciman
- Language: English
- Published: January 3, 2017
- Publisher: Farrar, Straus and Giroux
- Pages: 288
- ISBN: 978-0374148430

Enigma Variations is a 2017 novel by André Aciman. It was published in the United States by Farrar, Straus and Giroux.

== Plot ==
=== First Love ===
Paul revisits an Italian island where his family had abandoned their summer home after it burned down. When Paul was 12, his parents had commissioned Nanni to restore some furniture. Paul undertakes an apprenticeship with Nanni, and is interested in him sexually, but at the end of the chapter it is revealed Nanni had had a relationship with Paul’s father.

=== Spring Fever ===
Paul is living in New York with Maud. He spots Maud in a restaurant with another man. Later, Paul and Maud attend a dinner party, where the other man, Gabi, is present. Paul is jealous, but Maud tells him Gabi is gay and was interested in Paul. Paul reveals he is bisexual.

=== Manfred ===
At Paul's tennis club, he meets Manfred. They gradually build up a friendship, but Manfred is reluctant to take things further because he has a boyfriend.

=== Star Love ===
Paul is living with Manfred, and meets Chloe, who he sees approximately every four years. They rekindle their affair.

=== Abingdon Square ===
Paul meets a much younger writer, but is too hesitant to have sex with her. It is revealed he is married to Claire.

== Reception ==
The Guardian wrote "The absence of a conventional sense of story or structure reflects the musical form that Aciman is invoking, making this a clever experiment but also a frustrating one."

The New York Times wrote "if you think Aciman has explored this territory before — true, but he’s up to something bolder this time. This book reads as if he’s taken his three previous novels, combined and distilled them down to their essence."

== Television adaptation ==
In January 2025, it was reported that a limited series adaptation of the novel was in development at Netflix. Variety announced that Jeremy Allen White would play Paul and executive produce the series; Amanda Kate Shuman is set to write and serve as showrunner, with Oliver Hermanus directing. In March 2026, it was announced that the series was greenlighted by Netflix, with Aaron Taylor-Johnson set to replace White. In June 2026, Alicia Vikander was cast as Claire, one of Paul's love interests. In July 2026, Riley Keough, Devon Terrell, Carl Clemons-Hopkins and Nicholas Podany joined the cast as Maud, Manfred, Noah and Harlan respectively. In August 2026, Sarah Pidgeon, Peter Hermann, Juliana Canfield, Francesca Cavallin joined the series as Chloe, Isaac, Allie and Luciana respectively.
