= Call Me by Your Name (novel) =

2007 novel by André Aciman

Call Me by Your name
- First edition cover
- Author: André Aciman
- Audio read by: Armie Hammer
- Language: English
- Publisher: Farrar, Straus and Giroux
- Publication date: 2007
- Publication place: United States
- Media type: Print (hardcover and paperback)
- Pages: 256
- ISBN: 0-374-29921-8
- OCLC: 66463617
- Dewey Decimal: 813/.6
- LC Class: PS3601.C525 C35 2007
- Followed by: Find Me

Call Me by Your Name is a 2007 coming-of-age novel written by Italian-American writer André Aciman. Set in the 1980s, the novel centers on the sudden and powerful romance that blossoms between student Elio Perlman and visiting American scholar Oliver, chronicling their relationship and the 20 years that follow. In 2017, it was adapted into a critically acclaimed film of the same name. A sequel, Find Me, was released in October 2019.

== Plot summary ==
Elio Perlman recalls the events of the summer of 1983, when he was seventeen and living with his parents in Northern Italy. Each summer, his parents would take in a doctoral student as a house guest for six weeks, who would revise a book manuscript while assisting his father with academic paperwork. Elio resents the tradition, as it requires him to vacate his bedroom so the guest can use it for the duration of their stay.

Oliver, the guest for the summer, is carefree and detached—a stark contrast to Elio's introversion. Elio selected Oliver as a guest in the hopes of "instant affinities" between them and acts as his tour guide, though Elio's attempts to impress Oliver are met with indifference. Though Elio recognizes his own bisexuality and his attraction to Oliver—he is particularly excited by his discovery that Oliver is Jewish, seeing it as a bond between them—he doubts that Oliver reciprocates his feelings.

Eventually Elio confesses his attraction to Oliver, and they kiss on a berm where Claude Monet had supposedly painted some of his paintings. When Elio makes an advance on him, he rejects him.

Oliver and Elio grow distant in the subsequent days. Elio begins an affair with Marzia, his childhood friend who was madly in love with him. After going days without speaking, seeking reconciliation, Oliver slips a note under Elio's bedroom door, with a plan to meet at midnight. Elio feels guilty about the encounter and decides that he cannot continue his relationship with Oliver.

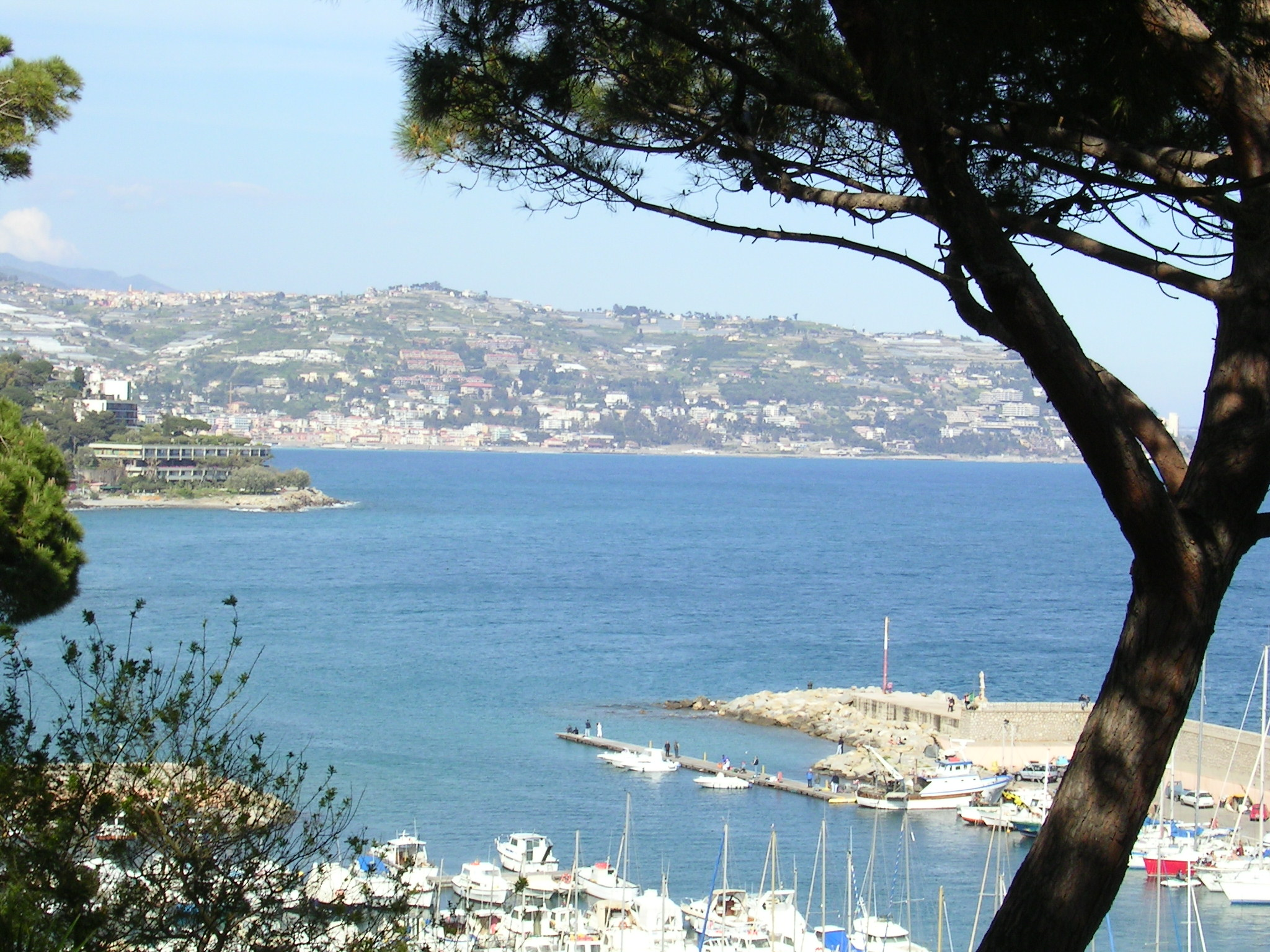
Aciman originally claimed that the novel was set in Bordighera, Liguria, but he later described the setting as an "imaginary" version of Italy that was more "Egypt transposed on to the Italian shore".

The next morning, after some flirtatious interactions, Elio realizes that his attraction to Oliver persists, and that he wishes to continue their relationship.

Before returning to the United States, Oliver decides to spend three days in Rome, where he is accompanied by Elio. The two roam the streets, drinking and falling more in love despite the upcoming dreaded moment of Oliver leaving. Elio is extremely heart broken and upon returning from the trip, he is saddened to find that his belongings have already been returned to his original bedroom that was once filled with Oliver's things, and that all traces of his short visit have vanished. Clearly distressed, Elio has a discussion with his father about the pair's "friendship". His father is very supportive and understanding, claiming he wishes he had experienced such a thing in his lifetime. He fully approves of the friendship (and relationship) between Elio and Oliver.

That Christmas, Oliver again visits the Perlman family, and announces that he intends to marry next spring. Oliver and Elio fall out of touch, and do not communicate with one another between the time that Oliver leaves Italy, and the end of year holidays, when Elio returns to his family's villa over the wintertime.

Fifteen years later, Elio visits Oliver in the United States, where Oliver is now a professor. Elio is unwilling to meet Oliver's wife and children, admitting that he still feels attraction towards Oliver and jealousy towards his new family. Oliver admits that he has followed Elio's academic career, and shows him a postcard that he brought with him when he left Italy and has kept over the years. During a final meeting at a bar, Elio and Oliver muse that people can lead two parallel lives—one in reality, and one a fantasy that is denied to them by external forces.

Five years later, Oliver visits Elio's family home in Italy. They recall their time together; Elio informs Oliver that his father has died, and that he has spread his ashes all over the world.

== Reception ==
=== Reviews ===
Reviewing for The New York Times, Stacey D'Erasmo called the novel "an exceptionally beautiful book". Writing in The New Yorker, Cynthia Zarin said, "Aciman’s first novel shows him to be an acute grammarian of desire". In The Washington Post, Charles Kaiser said, "If you have ever been the willing victim of obsessive love—a force greater than yourself that pulls you inextricably toward the object of your desire—you will recognize every nuance of André Aciman's superb new novel, Call Me by Your Name."

=== Sales ===
According to Nielsen BookScan, as of 19 February 2018, the book has sold 33,376 copies for £252,675 in the United Kingdom. In early November 2017, the book went from 618 copies sold to 1,164, an 88% jump in volume week on week. It reached 2,012 copies sold for the week ending February 3.

=== Awards ===
At the 20th Lambda Literary Awards, the novel won the award for Gay Fiction.

=== Banned book controversy ===
In January 2023, the book was permanently banned from libraries and classrooms in St. Johns County School District, Florida. In September 2023, the book was banned from libraries and classrooms in Matanuska-Susitna Borough School District, Alaska.

== Media ==
=== Film adaptation ===
A film adaptation directed by Luca Guadagnino and starring Timothée Chalamet as Elio, Armie Hammer as Oliver, and Michael Stuhlbarg as Elio's father was released on November 24, 2017, in the United States to critical acclaim. At the 90th Academy Awards, it was nominated for Best Picture, Best Actor (Chalamet), Best Original Song ("Mystery of Love" by Sufjan Stevens), and Best Adapted Screenplay (James Ivory), winning the latter.

Other roles were played by Amira Casar as Elio’s mother, Esther Garrel as Marzia, Victoire Du Bois as Chiara and others.

=== Audiobook ===
An audiobook narrated by Armie Hammer was published in 2017 by Macmillan Publishers.

== Sequel ==
On December 3, 2018, Aciman announced on his Twitter account that he was writing a sequel to Call Me by Your Name. On March 20, 2019, Aciman announced the sequel's title, Find Me. It was published by Farrar, Straus and Giroux on October 29, 2019.

== See also ==
- List of fiction works made into feature films (0–9, A–C)
