= Find Me (novel) =

2019 novel written by André Aciman

- First edition cover
- Author: André Aciman
- Audio read by: Michael Stuhlbarg
- Language: English
- Publisher: Farrar, Straus and Giroux
- Publication date: October 29, 2019
- Publication place: United States
- Media type: Print (hardcover and paperback; audiobook)
- Pages: 272
- ISBN: 978-0-374-15501-8
- Dewey Decimal: 813/.6
- LC Class: PS3601.C525 F56 2019
- Preceded by: Call Me by Your Name

Find Me is a 2019 novel by writer André Aciman. The novel follows the lives of Samuel "Sami" Perlman, his son Elio Perlman, and Oliver, characters established in Aciman's 2007 novel Call Me By Your Name.

== Plot ==
The novel is divided into four sections: Tempo, Cadenza, Capriccio, and Da capo. Each of the sections focuses on a different character’s point of view and narration.

=== Tempo ===
In 1993, a decade after the events of Call Me By Your Name, Samuel Perlman boards a train bound for Rome to visit his grown son, Elio, a gifted pianist. Samuel, a divorced scholar of classical literature, believes the finest chapters of his life are long gone. However, he is captivated by a striking young woman seated across from him. Their conversation flows effortlessly, an immediate rapport forming between them, as if they share an unspoken understanding despite being complete strangers.

Upon reaching Rome, the woman, Miranda, extends an invitation for Samuel to spend the day with her and her father. As the hours unfold with shopping, cooking, and dining together, an unexpected romance blossoms between them. Their connection feels serendipitous—two kindred spirits stumbling upon each other in a moment of exhilarating fate. They have sex, then become lovers, and Samuel, swept up in this newfound passion, asks Miranda to live with him in his coastal home. Without hesitation, she agrees, leaving behind her boyfriend to be with Samuel.

When Miranda meets Elio, he welcomes her to walk with him and his son through Rome to places they have visited before. Miranda and Samuel are hesitant about long-term relationships, yet they spend more time together and consider their relationship significant. Samuel had hoped for such a relationship earlier in life.

=== Cadenza ===
By 1998, Elio has settled in Paris, where he performs as a concert pianist and teaches music at a conservatory. One evening, he attends a recital by the Florian Quartet at a church, where he crosses paths with Michel, a distinguished, charismatic man. There is an immediate mutual attraction, and they arrange to see each other again. Their courtship begins with a date, followed by another, and soon, their relationship deepens into an impassioned bond.

Michel and Elio find solace in each other, their connection both tender and electric. As they navigate their time together—sometimes awkward, often profound—they share stories of past loves. Michel senses that Elio is still tethered to memories of Oliver, a former lover. Their conversations turn philosophical, particularly about fate: Michel embraces its inevitability, while Elio remains unconvinced.

During a trip to his country home with Elio, Michel unveils a mysterious sonata, a keepsake from his father, written by a man named Léon, whom he suspects was once his father’s secret lover. Entrusted with this hidden piece of history, Elio plays the composition on the piano and realizes it is not a sonata at all, but a cadenza—an improvisatory passage blending fragments of existing works. To his astonishment, this piece, dated 1944, weaves melodies from the Kol Nidre, suggesting that Léon was Jewish. Intrigued, Elio investigates further and discovers that Léon was actually Ariel Waldstein, a musician from the Florian Quartet—the very ensemble that once performed in the church where he and Michel met. Waldstein was killed in a concentration camp after refusing to part with his violin.

As Elio prepares for an upcoming tour in the United States, where he plans to reunite with Oliver after fifteen years, Michel quietly acknowledges that he is not the person Elio is destined to be with.

=== Capriccio ===
In 2003, Oliver and his wife, Micol, are hosting a farewell gathering in their soon-to-be-vacant New York City apartment. An accomplished academic, Oliver has spent a sabbatical at a university in the city, but he and Micol are now preparing to return to New Hampshire. Among the guests are two individuals who have stirred something within him: Erica, a stunning woman he met in yoga class, and Paul, a charming colleague. His invitations were not casual—he is drawn to them both.

Throughout the evening, Oliver balances the roles of host and observer, stealing fleeting moments with Erica and Paul, though nothing comes of his attraction. As Paul plays the piano for the guests, long-dormant memories of Elio resurface. When the party winds down, Micol retires for the night, leaving Oliver alone with his thoughts, a cigarette, and a drink.

He imagines a conversation with Bach about music’s power to move the soul, then conjures an exchange with Elio, revisiting their shared past. Later, he drifts into sleep, dreaming of having sex with both Erica and Paul at the same time. Despite his love for Micol and their seemingly well-matched partnership, Oliver is restless, haunted by what could have been—and what still lingers in his heart.

=== Da capo ===
Shortly after, Oliver ultimately leaves his marriage and finds his way back to Elio at Samuel’s seaside home. Samuel has died, leaving behind Miranda and their seven-year-old son, Ollie. Though years have elapsed, Oliver and Elio rekindle their romance, rediscovering the passion they once shared.

Yet, the house, now brimming with ghosts of the past and the presence of Miranda, Ollie, and Elio’s mother, stirs conflicting emotions. Elio wonders if he clings to their history more than Oliver does, but he refrains from voicing his fears—after all, Oliver has abandoned much to be with him.

Seeking solitude, they go on a trip along the Mediterranean coast, where they finally give voice to their deepest truths. They speak of love, longing, and the relentless pull that has kept them tethered despite time and distance. In the end, they recognize what they have always known: they had spent their lives waiting for each other to return.

== Background ==
On December 6, 2017, when asked about a proposed sequel to the film adaptation of Call Me by Your Name, Aciman replied that "the problem with a sequel is that you need plot." On December 3, 2018, Aciman announced on his Twitter account that he was writing a sequel to Call Me by Your Name. The novel's title and release date were officially confirmed on March 20, 2019.

== Release ==
The novel was published by Farrar, Straus and Giroux on October 29, 2019. The audiobook is read by actor Michael Stuhlbarg, who portrayed Elio's father, Sami Perlman, in the film adaptation of Call Me by Your Name.

Ahead of its release, on October 11, 2019, Vanity Fair published an exclusive excerpt from the novel, along with two illustrations by Jenny Kroik.
