= Alexander Aciman =

American writer and journalist

- Born: 1990 (age 35–36); New York City, U.S.
- Education: University of Chicago
- Occupations: Writer; journalist; screenwriter
- Parents: André Aciman (father); Susan Wiviott (mother)

Alexander Aciman (born 1990) is an American writer and journalist. His work has appeared in Tablet Magazine, The New York Times, Vox, The New Republic, The New Yorker online, Time magazine, and The Paris Review online. He is a graduate of The University of Chicago, and when he was a freshman co-authored Twitterature: The World's Greatest Books in Twenty Tweets or Less, published by Penguin Classics.

== Early life ==
Aciman is the son of writer André Aciman and Susan Wiviott, a non-profit executive. He is a graduate of the University of Chicago.

== Career ==
In spring 2009, Aciman and Emmett Rensin began turning books on their University of Chicago reading lists into short “tweets,” which became the basis for Twitterature. He has also worked on the Netflix food documentary series Rotten as a screenwriter.

Aciman has published journalism and essays in outlets including Tablet, Vox, The Wall Street Journal, and The New Republic.

== Personal life ==
As of 2018, Aciman lived in New York City. He is fluent in French. He has two brothers, Philip and Michael, who are twins.

== Works ==
- Aciman, Alexander; Rensin, Emmett (2009). Twitterature: The World's Greatest Books in Twenty Tweets or Less. Penguin Classics.
