= Hacks =

American dark comedy drama television series

- Genre: Comedy drama; Dark comedy
- Created by: Lucia Aniello; Paul W. Downs; Jen Statsky
- Showrunners: Lucia Aniello; Paul W. Downs; Jen Statsky
- Starring: Jean Smart; Hannah Einbinder; Carl Clemons-Hopkins; Megan Stalter; Paul W. Downs; Rose Abdoo; Mark Indelicato
- Composers: Carlos Rafael Rivera; David Stal
- Country of origin: United States
- Original language: English
- No. of seasons: 5
- No. of episodes: 47

Production
- Executive producers: Jen Statsky; Paul W. Downs; Lucia Aniello; Michael Schur; David Miner; Morgan Sackett
- Producers: Melanie J. Elin; Seth Edelstein; Ashley Glazier; Samantha Riley; Nate Young
- Cinematography: Adam Bricker
- Editors: Jessica Brunetto; Jon Philpot; Rob Paglia; Susan Vaill
- Camera setup: Single-camera
- Running time: 26–47 minutes
- Production companies: First Thought; Paulilu; Fremulon; 3 Arts Entertainment; Universal Television

Original release
- Network: HBO Max (Note: The streaming service was rebranded as "Max," which ran from 2023 to 2025, before reverting back to its original name.)
- Release: May 13, 2021 – May 28, 2026

Hacks is an American dark comedy drama television series created by Lucia Aniello, Paul W. Downs, and Jen Statsky that premiered on May 13, 2021, on HBO Max. It follows Deborah Vance (Jean Smart), a stand-up comedian, and her comedy writer Ava Daniels (Hannah Einbinder), as they navigate the evolving dynamics of their professional partnership and personal lives within the contemporary comedy industry. The series concluded on May 28, 2026, after five seasons and 47 episodes.

Hacks received critical acclaim and won a number of major awards, including five nominations for the Primetime Emmy Award for Outstanding Comedy Series, winning that award for its third season. Its first and third seasons won the Writers Guild of America Award for Television: Comedy Series and the Golden Globe Award for Best Television Series – Musical or Comedy, and its third season won the Television Critics Association Award for Outstanding Achievement in Comedy.

Smart's performance won her five Primetime Emmy Awards, becoming the first actress in history to win for all seasons of a multi-season show. She also earned three Screen Actors Guild Awards, four Critics' Choice Awards, two Television Critics Association Awards, and three Golden Globe Awards. Einbinder received five Emmy nominations for Outstanding Supporting Actress in a Comedy Series, winning in 2025. Other members of the cast who received Emmy nominations include Downs (two nominations), Carl Clemons-Hopkins (one nomination), and Megan Stalter (one nomination).

== Premise ==
Deborah Vance, a legendary Las Vegas-based stand-up comedian, needs to reinvent her aging act to avoid losing her residency at the Palmetto Casino. Ava Daniels is a young comedy writer who is unable to find work due to an insensitive tweet and her reputation for being self-centered and arrogant. When Ava's agent sends her to work as Deborah's new head writer, the two slowly bond as Ava pushes her new boss to take more risks and Deborah, in turn, helps Ava start to work through her personal problems.

== Cast and characters ==
=== Main ===
- Jean Smart as Deborah Vance, a legendary Las Vegas stand-up comedian
- Hannah Einbinder as Ava Daniels, a down-on-her-luck comedy writer
- Carl Clemons-Hopkins as Marcus Vaughan, COO (season 1) and later as CEO (seasons 2–5) of Deborah's management company and her closest advisor
- Megan Stalter as Kayla Schaefer, who works as Jimmy's assistant and later his co-manager (seasons 3–5; recurring seasons 1–2)
- Paul W. Downs as Jimmy LuSaque Jr., Deborah and Ava's manager (seasons 3–5; recurring seasons 1–2)
- Rose Abdoo as Josefina, Deborah's estate manager (seasons 3–5; (Note: Credited as "starring" in a secondary billing block for seasons 3–4.) recurring seasons 1–2)
- Mark Indelicato as Damien Asada Agosto, Deborah's personal assistant (seasons 3–5; recurring seasons 1–2)

=== Recurring ===
- Kaitlin Olson as Deborah "DJ" Vance Jr., Deborah's daughter
- Christopher McDonald as Marty Ghilain, CEO of the Palmetto Casino
- Poppy Liu as Kiki Loas, Deborah's personal blackjack dealer
- Johnny Sibilly as Wilson, a water inspector who gets entangled with Marcus
- Angela E. Gibbs as Robin, Marcus' mother
- Jane Adams as Nina Daniels, Ava's mother
- Lorenza Izzo as Ruby, an actress and Ava's girlfriend (seasons 1–4)
- Luenell as Miss Loretta, Robin's best friend
- Joe Mande as Ray, a hotel clerk for the Palmetto (seasons 1–3, 5)
- Lauren Weedman as Jo Pezzimenti, the mayor of Las Vegas
- Helen Hunt as Winnie Landell, a network executive (seasons 3–4)
- Dan Bucatinsky as Rob, the executive producer of Late Night with Deborah Vance (seasons 3–4)
- Tony Goldwyn as Bob Lipka, a top executive of the conglomerate that owns Late Night (seasons 3–5)
- Michaela Watkins as Stacey, the HR representative at the TV studio (season 4)
- Robby Hoffman as Randi, the new assistant for Jimmy and Kayla (seasons 4–5)

=== Guest ===
- Jefferson Mays as T.L. Gurley, an antique dealer who holds a grudge against Deborah (seasons 1 and 5)
- Brent Sexton (season 1) and W. Earl Brown (seasons 2–5) as Michael, Jimmy's boss and Kayla's father
- Jeff Ward as George, a man Ava meets and bonds with (season 1)
- Paul Felder as Aidan Paladecki, DJ's mixed martial artist husband. (seasons 1–4)
- Louis Herthum as Dennis Daniels, Ava's father (season 1)
- Anna Maria Horsford as Francine, a veteran comedian who is an old friend of Deborah (season 1)
- Linda Purl (season 1) and J. Smith-Cameron (seasons 3 and 5) as Kathy Vance, Deborah's estranged sister
- Chris Geere and Kirby Howell-Baptiste as Jesse and Daisy, two British TV producers who interview Ava (season 1)
- Amanda Payton as Jackie (season 1)
- Martha Kelly as Barbara, a human resources representative (season 2)
- Ming-Na Wen as Janet Stone, a talent agent and Jimmy's rival (season 2)
- Polly Draper as Diana, Deborah's psychic (seasons 2 and 4–5)
- Laurie Metcalf as "Weed" / Alice, an eccentric tour manager (seasons 2 and 5)
- Harriet Sansom Harris as Susan, a former comedian and an old friend of Deborah (season 2)
- Susie Essman as Elaine Carter, a director and an old friend of Deborah (season 2)
- Kyle Gass as Axel (season 2)
- Devon Sawa as Jason, a man who has a one-night stand with Deborah (season 2)
- Jessica Chaffin as Jill, Ava's pro bono legal advisor (season 2)
- Paula Andrea Placido as Rian, Ava’s tenant (season 2)
- Caitlin Reilly as Jessica Duncan, a streaming executive who backs Deborah's My Bad special (season 2) and moves on to produce Ava's Who's Making Dinner? reboot (season 5)
- Michael Garza as Silas (seasons 2–3 and 5)
- Dylan Gelula and Jordan Gavaris as Mirya and Logan, Deborah's new writers (season 3)
- Matt Bush as Clive, a comedian with a serious cancer diagnosis (seasons 3–4)
- Aristotle Athari as Lewis, a television host and Ava's new boss (seasons 3–4)
- Rachael Taylor as Alexis, Deborah's stylist (season 3)
- Luke Macfarlane as Brad (season 3)
- Guy Branum as Ezekiel, a man selling unlicensed Deborah Vance merchandise (seasons 3 and 5)
- J. D. Walsh as Steve (season 3)
- Ely Henry as Lance (season 3)
- Dolly Wells as Laurie, a member of DJ's NA group (season 3)
- Luke Cook as Jack Danby, a younger comedian competing with Deborah to host Late Night (season 3)
- Stephen Tobolowsky as Henry Weeks (season 3)
- Joel Brooks as Terry Bernstein (season 3)
- Gregg Daniel as Cliff Calhoun (season 3)
- Hank Chen as Lawrence (season 3)
- Christina Hendricks as Megan, an executive Ava encounters at a golf tournament (season 3)
- Christopher Lloyd as Larry Arbuckle, grandson of silent film actor Fatty Arbuckle (season 3)
- Deidre Hall as herself, Jimmy's mother (seasons 3 and 5)
- Tim Bagley as Reggie (season 3)
- Hal Linden as Biff Cliff, a retired network executive (season 3)
- Kathryn Newton as Bella Donaldson, an up-and-coming actress (season 3)
- Bresha Webb as Cece Heaumeaux, a PR executive (season 4)
- Jake Shane as Deborah’s social media manager (season 4)
- Julianne Nicholson as Mary Alice a.k.a. Dance Mom, a social media star (season 4)
- Eric Balfour as Ethan Sommers, a movie star facing accusations of sexual misconduct (season 4)
- Alanna Ubach as Amanda Weinberg, a talent booker for Madison Square Garden (season 5)
- Ann Dowd as a celebrity Deborah meets at a fan convention (season 5)
- Christopher Briney as Nico Hayes, a singer in residence at the Palmetto (season 5)
- Lucia Aniello as Meredith, a realtor who attempts to sell an old casino to Marcus (season 5)
- Anna Konkle as Beth, a Paley Center employee (season 5)
- Peter Strauss as Frank Vance, Deborah's deceased ex-husband seen in archival footage (season 5)
- Sean Patton as Bruno Foxx, a stand-up comic Jimmy and Kayla try to hire for a residency at The Diva (season 5)
- Alex Moffat as Graham Sweeney, a venture capitalist developing a comedy AI (season 5)
- Cherry Jones as Kelly Kilpatrick, a fellow comedian who despises Deborah (season 5)
- Leslie Bibb as Monica, Kelly's wife (season 5)

=== Cameos ===
A number of comedians and celebrities guest-star or make cameo appearances as themselves throughout the series:

- Wayne Newton (season 2)
- Margaret Cho (season 2)
- George Wallace (season 3)
- Carrot Top (season 3)
- Mario Cantone (season 3)
- Naomi Ekperigin (season 3)
- Natasha Leggero (season 3)
- Andy Kindler (season 3)
- Steph Tolev (season 3)
- Patton Oswalt (season 3)
- Mario Lopez (season 3)
- The cast of The View (Whoopi Goldberg, Joy Behar, Sunny Hostin, Sara Haines and Alyssa Farah Griffin) (seasons 3 and 5)
- Carol Burnett (season 4)
- Randy Newman (season 4)
- Merrill Markoe (seasons 4–5)
- Kristen Bell (season 4)
- Jimmy Kimmel (season 4)
- Antoni Porowski (season 4)
- Rosie O'Donnell (season 4)
- Seth Rogen (season 4)
- Kaia Gerber (season 4)
- Melissa Etheridge (season 4)
- Katie Couric (season 4)
- Tony Kushner (season 5)
- Sandra Lee Gimpel (season 5)
- Soleil Moon Frye (season 5)
- William Baldwin (season 5)
- Renee O'Connor (season 5)
- Jesse McCartney (season 5)
- Phil Keoghan (season 5)
- Drew Scott and Jonathan Scott (season 5)
- J.R. Smith and Richard Jefferson (season 5)
- Jordan Firstman and Trisha Paytas (season 5)
- Elise Doganieri (season 5)
- Bob Mackie (season 5)
- Katya Zamolodchikova (season 5)
- The hosts of The Breakfast Club (Charlamagne tha God, DJ Envy and Jess Hilarious) (season 5)
- The hosts of Today (Al Roker and Savannah Guthrie) (season 5)

== Episodes ==
Season	Episodes	Originally released	
Season	Episodes	First released	Last released
1	10	May 13, 2021	June 10, 2021
2	8	May 12, 2022	June 2, 2022
3	9	May 2, 2024	May 30, 2024
4	10	April 10, 2025	May 29, 2025
5	10	April 9, 2026	May 28, 2026

=== Season 1 (2021) ===
No. overall	No. in season	Title	Directed by	Written by	Original release date
1	1	"There Is No Line"	Lucia Aniello	Lucia Aniello & Paul W. Downs & Jen Statsky	May 13, 2021
2	2	"Primm"	Lucia Aniello	Paul W. Downs	May 13, 2021
3	3	"A Gig's a Gig"	Lucia Aniello	Lucia Aniello	May 20, 2021
4	4	"D'Jewelry"	Desiree Akhavan	Joanna Calo	May 20, 2021
5	5	"Falling"	Paul W. Downs	Andrew Law	May 27, 2021
6	6	"New Eyes"	Lucia Aniello	Lucia Aniello & Paul W. Downs & Jen Statsky	May 27, 2021
7	7	"Tunnel of Love"	Desiree Akhavan	Katherine Kearns	June 3, 2021
8	8	"1.69 Million"	Paul W. Downs	Pat Regan	June 3, 2021
9	9	"Interview"	Lucia Aniello	Samantha Riley	June 10, 2021
10	10	"I Think She Will"	Lucia Aniello	Ariel Karlin & Jen Statsky	June 10, 2021

=== Season 2 (2022) ===
No. overall	No. in season	Title	Directed by	Written by	Original release date
11	1	"There Will Be Blood"	Lucia Aniello	Lucia Aniello & Paul W. Downs & Jen Statsky	May 12, 2022
12	2	"Quid Pro Quo"	Lucia Aniello	Lucia Aniello & Paul W. Downs & Jen Statsky	May 12, 2022
13	3	"Trust the Process"	Lucia Aniello	Lucia Aniello & Paul W. Downs & Jen Statsky	May 19, 2022
14	4	"The Captain's Wife"	Lucia Aniello	Ariel Karlin & Pat Regan	May 19, 2022
15	5	"Retired"	Paul W. Downs	Andrew Law	May 26, 2022
16	6	"The Click"	Paul W. Downs	Aisha Muharrar & Joe Mande	May 26, 2022
17	7	"On the Market"	Lucia Aniello	Samantha Riley	June 2, 2022
18	8	"The One, the Only"	Trent O'Donnell	Lucia Aniello & Paul W. Downs & Jen Statsky	June 2, 2022

=== Season 3 (2024) ===
No. overall	No. in season	Title	Directed by	Written by	Original release date
19	1	"Just for Laughs"	Lucia Aniello	Lucia Aniello & Paul W. Downs & Jen Statsky	May 2, 2024
Ava has a writing job for a series in Los Angeles and has moved in with her ex-girlfriend, Ruby. Meanwhile, Deborah's stand-up special is bringing her increasing success, which culminates in an invitation to receive an award in Canada. Coincidentally, Ava is also in Canada to attend a panel. After bumping into each other, they go to Deborah's hotel room to catch up, their conversation starting on friendly terms. However, the mood shifts when Ava becomes upset about Deborah not replying to her messages or staying in touch. Deborah shows no remorse, explaining that she thought it was best for Ava to find her own path. Frustrated, Ava storms off. The next day, Ava attends her panel and is asked for advice on pursuing a career in TV writing despite repeated challenges. Initially answering the question with a generic response, Ava changes her mind and reaffirms that comedy writing is a difficult line of work and that persistence can lead to success. Later, as Deborah prepares to accept her award, Ava texts her a suggested ending for a joke in her speech.
20	2	"Better Late"	Lucia Aniello	Andrew Law	May 2, 2024
Ava and Deborah have made amends and begin to text regularly. Deborah is invited onto a late-night show to discuss her special, but when host Danny Collins falls ill, she steps in as guest host. Unhappy with the new material her writers provide, Deborah calls Ava, who comes to the studio to write for her and watch the taping. After the show goes successfully, Danny Collins tells Deborah that he will be leaving at the end of his contract. Sensing an opportunity, Deborah invites Ava back as her writer. Meanwhile, Ava finds a ring, leading her to think Ruby is about to propose. While discussing Deborah's offer, Ava tries to prompt the proposal, but Ruby awkwardly reveals the ring is just a prop from her show, "Wolf Girl." The couple argues over Ava's potential return to Deborah, with Ruby reminding her of the pain it caused before. Ruby suggests they take a break, so Ava leaves for Deborah's house.
21	3	"The Roast of Deborah Vance"	Jeff Rosenberg	Joe Mande	May 9, 2024
To position herself as a contender for Danny Collins' late-night hosting gig, Deborah organizes a celebrity roast for herself to showcase her comedic relevance. Comedians Patton Oswalt, Natasha Leggero, Andy Kindler, Steph Tolev, and Naomi Ekperigin perform, with Mario Cantone as host. Ava is conflicted about the roast format and is tasked with firing two new team members, testing her dynamic with Deborah. The evening takes a personal turn when Deborah's daughter, DJ, delivers a biting and revealing roast set that exposes unresolved tensions between them.
22	4	"Join the Club"	Jessica Brunetto	Guy Branum	May 9, 2024
Deborah receives an invitation to socialize with a group of elite comedians she has long admired, hoping to boost her chances at landing a late-night hosting gig. However, she soon realizes that their camaraderie is more exclusionary than supportive, causing her to question the value of their validation. Meanwhile, Jimmy arranges an important meeting with a network executive to further Deborah's prospects. Ava joins Marcus' trivia team, offering her a brief escape from workplace pressures.
23	5	"One Day"	Lucia Aniello	Carol Leifer & Carolyn Lipka	May 16, 2024
Deborah and Ava, grappling with their respective challenges, Deborah with writer's block and Ava with the emotional aftermath of a breakup, decide to take a hike in the woods to clear their heads. However, their excursion takes an unexpected turn as they become lost without a means of communication.
24	6	"Par for the Course"	Paul W. Downs	Ariel Karlin	May 16, 2024
Deborah Vance participates in a high-stakes charity golf tournament, aiming to impress network affiliates and executives who could influence her bid for a late-night hosting position. With Ava serving as her caddy, Deborah navigates the course, balancing strategic conversations with her performance on the green. The event features guest appearances by Tony Goldwyn as media CEO Bob Lipka and Christina Hendricks as a captivating attendee who catches Ava's attention. Meanwhile, Marcus faces a potential career shift when approached by QVC for a new opportunity.
25	7	"The Deborah Vance Christmas Spectacular"	Lucia Aniello	Pat Regan	May 23, 2024
Deborah throws a lavish Christmas party and invites her estranged sister Kathy, hoping to reconnect. Their reunion escalates into a tense confrontation. Ava's mother, Nina, shows up uninvited, complicating Ava's night. Meanwhile, Jimmy and Kayla try to convince Larry Arbuckle to greenlight a Fatty Arbuckle biopic in an effort to lure Jack Danby away from the late-night hosting job.
26	8	"Yes, And"	Paul W. Downs	Samantha Riley & Lucia Aniello & Jen Statsky & Paul W. Downs	May 23, 2024
Deborah travels to Berkeley to receive an honorary degree, but her plans are disrupted when a viral supercut of her past offensive jokes resurfaces online, leading to widespread backlash. Amid the controversy, a scheduling error results in her being double-booked, further complicating her situation. In an attempt to mitigate the fallout, Deborah performs at a college improv show, trying to connect with a younger audience.
27	9	"Bulletproof"	Lucia Aniello	Lucia Aniello & Jen Statsky & Paul W. Downs	May 30, 2024
After finally securing her dream job, host of a late night show, Deborah is preparing to move to Los Angeles. Meanwhile, Deborah cuts short her planned visit with her sister Kathy and during the sisters' visit to the mausoleum where their parents are buried, Deborah coldly reveals that she had her parents moved to a plot in Las Vegas without telling Kathy. Kathy, upset and hurt, tells Deborah she cannot continue reconciling with her and leaves. Kayla quits as Jimmy's assistant after a meeting with prospective new representation goes awry. They eventually reconcile, and Jimmy promotes Kayla to co-manager. Deborah asks Ava to be her head writer for the new show, which Ava gladly accepts. Ava gets the exact same head writer offer from her previous TV show job but declines, choosing instead to stay with Deborah. However, Deborah later tells Ava that the network is requiring she keep the head writer who had been at the late night show for decades. Dejected, Ava runs into Winnie, one of the network executives, and begs her to consider promoting Ava to the head writer position instead only to find out that Deborah lied to Ava: the network never forced Deborah to keep the former head writer and Ava could have had the opportunity all along. Ava and Deborah have an angry confrontation where Deborah insists she cannot take any risks, implying Ava is the riskier choice for head writer, while Ava accuses Deborah of always prioritizing her own ambition at the expense of her personal relationships. The next morning, Deborah finds Ava waiting in the writer's room. Deborah is thrilled that Ava decided to stay on her writing staff, while Ava gives Deborah an ultimatum: make Ava head writer or Ava discloses publicly that Deborah slept with a network chairman right before securing the late-night host job.

=== Season 4 (2025) ===
No. overall	No. in season	Title	Directed by	Written by	Original release date
28	1	"Big, Brave Girl"	Lucia Aniello	Lucia Aniello & Paul W. Downs & Jen Statsky	April 10, 2025
Immediately following Ava's blackmail, Deborah retaliates and the tension between the two escalates, jeopardizing their professional partnership. At the show's first press conference, Deborah refuses to use Ava's material, resulting in poor responses to questions about ageism and sexism in the industry. Meanwhile, Marcus resigns due to conflicts between Deborah's QVC partnership and the new show. During a party at Bob Lipka's home, Ava confronts Deborah, threatening to leak Deborah's affair with Bob to The New Yorker if she doesn't admit Ava has "won." Jimmy intervenes, trying to manage their public dispute. To counter the negative reaction from the press conference, publicist Cece and exec Winnie arrange for a New York Times Magazine cover story. At the shoot, Deborah tells Ava she has won and broken her heart, and after the show ends, she will never speak to her again. Ava responds that Deborah broke Ava's heart first.
29	2	"Cover Girls"	Lucia Aniello	Samantha Riley	April 10, 2025
Following nightmares and a small animal carcass on her doorstep, Deborah hires her psychic, Diana, as a producer on the show. Deborah and Ava clash over who to hire as writers: Ava favors young, up-and-coming comedians while Deborah insists on experienced writers. During an argument while out scouting for talent, Ava accuses Deborah of disagreeing with her out of ego, but Deborah explains that Ava's comedy is too niche for a late-night audience of "mechanics and housewives". Jimmy struggles to maintain civility between the two, while Kayla hires assistant Randi and sells her first show. Meanwhile, Marcus inks an impressive deal for the sale of Deborah Vance Industries. Deborah and Ava go to dinner at Winnie's, who confronts the two about their working relationship and its effect on the show. She impresses on the two, the immense pressure they're facing from the network. Deborah ultimately compromises on the writers, and she and Ava call a truce for the sake of the show.
30	3	"What Happens in Vegas"	Lucia Aniello	Ariel Karlin	April 17, 2025
Deborah takes the writers to Vegas for a team building retreat. She and Ava quickly learn that their approaches are different: Deborah rushes into the work while Ava wants to take it slower so the writers can bond with each other. After some failed attempts to write the opening segment, Deborah concedes and lets the writers enjoy Vegas and bond, with race cars, a trip to the casino, and later a strip club after doing drugs provided by Deborah. Later that night, Deborah and Ava are pulled over by Vegas police for speeding. Deborah calls Mayor Jo, who saves them from being arrested if Deborah agrees to do a gig for a mayoral fundraising event. Back in L.A., Deborah and Ava receive multiple HR reports from the writers over the retreat, resulting in the network assigning HR chaperone Stacey to supervise the two.
31	4	"I Love LA"	Paul W. Downs	Pat Regan	April 24, 2025
At the dress rehearsal for the premiere, Deborah has a panic attack. Insulted by suggestions of stage fright, she cruelly blames Ava's writing. Winnie sends Deborah to the cardiologist, where she meets Carol Burnett, and the two have an inspiring conversation. During the opening monologue of the premiere, Deborah gets over her panic by focusing on Ava. Jimmy tries to make plans with Deborah and Ava after the show's premiere, but they both blow him off: Deborah wants to mingle with guests and network execs, while Ava wants to support the writers. However, guest Randy Newman and Winnie decline Deborah's dinner invites, as do the writers to Ava. Deborah hits the town with Damien, who takes her to a gay bar, where she hits her head on a go-go cage after "non-consensually" taking poppers. Meanwhile, during a tow truck mix-up, Ava meets married couple Emily and Dev who ask her out. Soon after, she gets a call and meets Deborah at the hospital, where the two watch the premiere live in the lobby.
32	5	"Clickable Face"	Paul W. Downs	Aisha Muharrar	May 1, 2025
Despite initially good ratings, the show needs to boost its appeal to women 25–45, notably mothers. Deborah attempts to book Kristen Bell, who is already booked for Jimmy Kimmel Live!, but is stopped by Kimmel, who reveals the lengths he's taken to get good bookings. Kayla suggests bringing in TikTok star Dance Mom. Later, Deborah crashes a date Ava is on with Emily and Dev, where she learns Ava has been badmouthing the show. Deborah and Ava clash on the direction of the show: Ava wants to lean into a unique identity while Deborah is spooked by feedback from focus groups. When Ava adds a joke to the monologue that Deborah has expressly denied, the two clash in the studio, culminating in a last-minute, desperate choice to bring out Dance Mom to save the evening.
33	6	"Mrs. Table"	Paul W. Downs	Carolyn Lipka	May 8, 2025
The show books Ava's ex-girlfriend Ruby Rojas as a guest. Deborah accuses Ava of not being up to the task of refining a segment before taping, so she scraps the bit and uses the extra time to grill Ruby on Ava's mishap with the ring, humiliating Ava. That night, Emily and Dev break up with Ava, accusing her of refusing to open up. In the writers' room, when Ava realizes the writers are taking advantage of her (which Deborah had warned her about), she snaps and angrily quits. That night, Deborah attends a network-sponsored awards ceremony where she bumps into Rosie O'Donnell, who invigorates her about her show. Afterward, one of Deborah's corgis is non-fatally attacked by a coyote, which she perceives as a bad omen. Deborah, Jimmy, and Kayla realize Ava is missing. Deborah tracks her to the beach, going so far as to run into the ocean to save a woman she initially mistakes for Ava. The two make up, and Deborah concedes they need to take the show in a fresh direction.
34	7	"D'Christening"	Doron Max Hagay	Joe Mande	May 15, 2025
With the show slowly moving up the ratings, Dance Mom nabs a brand ambassadorship with Old Navy and the show gets higher-profile bookings. At AJ's christening, DJ asks Ava to be baby AJ's godmother, while Deborah mocks the Catholicism. An enraged DJ threatens to cut contact, causing Deborah to want to maintain good relationships with her family. Jimmy and Kayla struggle to keep Dance Mom under control as she spirals deeper into a partying lifestyle. When Old Navy threatens to revoke their deal, Dance Mom reveals she is not a mother. Despite the network's focus on booking high-profile guests, Deborah scouts an up-and-coming standup comic for the show.
35	8	"Witch of the Week"	Lucia Aniello	Andrew Law	May 15, 2025
Jimmy secretly arranges to have lunch with both Deborah and Ava to get them to make up, but he is both shocked and hurt to learn they already have and didn't tell him. Ava's mom comes to visit and pressures Ava about having children. Deborah is under pressure from Winnie to come up with a spin-off the network can capitalize on. Mayor Jo is arrested for having an orgy on a Zamboni, and Deborah visits her to convince her to appear on the show and revitalize her image. One of Jimmy's biggest clients, Clive, is poached by Latitude. In order to promote teaser clips, the network agrees to tape each show a day early, forgoing topical comedy for more strategic guests with viral potential. The show hits #1 in ratings, but Deborah is frustrated by Winnie's focus on a spin-off and calls Bob to complain. As a result, Bob fires Winnie.
36	9	"A Slippery Slope"	Lucia Aniello	Lucia Aniello & Paul W. Downs & Jen Statsky	May 22, 2025
In exchange for Bob firing Winnie, Deborah agrees to have movie star Ethan Sommers on as a guest. This deeply upsets Ava, who protests due to his many allegations of domestic violence and sexual misconduct. Jimmy and Kayla discover Dance Mom in nearly critical condition, ultimately feeding her excessive amounts of cocaine so she can perform, causing Jimmy to hit a breaking point. Ava runs into her former boss Lewis at a bar, where she vents her frustrations about the Ethan Sommers booking. Soon after, Deborah and Ava learn that Lewis' show is doing a hit piece on the network, alleging they have been covering up Sommers' behavior to protect their interests. Ava admits to Deborah she leaked the story. When the two seek out Jimmy, Kayla harshly scolds them both for always taking advantage of him. Deborah visits Jimmy at home and apologizes. Bob reveals to Deborah he knows it was Ava who leaked the story and insists she be fired. At the evening's show taping, Deborah sends Ava off to do a location piece, but it is simply to get Ava as far away from the studio as she can. During her opening monologue, Deborah reveals that the network is participating in a "slippery slope" of behavior. Instead of agreeing to problematic capitalistic systems trying to navigate the intersection between art and commerce, she quits on the air. Ava finally makes it back to the studio, and the two tearfully leave together. In the parking lot, Bob stops them, threatening to sue Deborah if she defies her 18-month non-compete contract.
37	10	"Heaven"	Lucia Aniello	Lucia Aniello & Paul W. Downs & Jen Statsky	May 29, 2025
Forced to accept the limitations of her non-compete contract and the sale of Deborah Vance Industries, Deborah struggles with the lack of fulfillment in her life. Marty convinces Deborah to go on a vacation, and she flies to Singapore with an unsuspecting Ava. At the local resort casino, Deborah reveals she can perform through a translator, exploiting a loophole in her non-compete. Deborah's shows go well enough that she begins a months-long residency, and though she initially spends time bonding with Ava, she quickly succumbs to the casino lifestyle: partying, drinking heavily, and neglecting her comedy writing. When Ava confronts her, an intoxicated Deborah insults Ava's meandering career and lack of friends. Ava decides to leave. The next morning, Ava discovers that tabloids have falsely reported that Deborah has died. Furious that her obituary states she is retired and that she killed the entire late night comedy genre, Deborah states that they are going to set their careers back on track.

=== Season 5 (2026) ===
No. overall	No. in season	Title	Directed by	Written by	Original release date
38	1	"EGOT"	Lucia Aniello	Lucia Aniello & Paul W. Downs & Jen Statsky	April 9, 2026
Deborah and Ava return from Singapore to learn that Bob Lipka has been mounting a smear campaign against Deborah, which has also caused Jimmy's agency to lose business. Deborah decides winning a Grammy and an Oscar to complete her EGOT status will restore her legacy, while Ava offers her Mall Girl script for Jimmy to find buyers. Ava eventually tells Deborah to refocus on comedy. When her comedy special and talk show monologues are removed from the Lipka-owned streaming platform, Deborah bypasses the non-compete clause by organizing a secret comedy show with a no-phones rule at a warehouse run by Marcus. Deborah is then served a court order from Lipka after footage from the show is leaked online. The judge rules in favor of Lipka and places a temporary restraining order that bars Deborah from performing. Deborah announces to the press that once her contract expires, she will reveal everything at her comeback show at Madison Square Garden, determined to cement her legacy by being one of the few comedians to sell out the venue. As Jimmy ponders how much publicity they have gained despite the ban, Ava admits that she leaked the video to set things in motion.
39	2	"Number One Fan"	Lucia Aniello	Ariel Karlin	April 16, 2026
After preemptively announcing her Madison Square Garden show, Deborah and the team unsuccessfully try to convince the venue's booker, Amanda Weinberg, in New York to secure a date. Deborah agrees to appear at fan convention in Las Vegas to convince her fan base, the Little Debbies, to rally for her but learns they have felt abandoned by her since she went to Hollywood. Deborah apologizes to her fans for neglecting them and admits her difficulties in booking MSG, which fires them up to convince Amanda. Meanwhile, Jimmy's suggestion to his idol Renee O'Connor that she do a Xena: Warrior Princess rewatch podcast convinces her to be his client. Back at home, Deborah throws Ava a lavish surprise 30th birthday party featuring Jesse McCartney out of guilt for drunkenly blurting out in Singapore that it was weird that Ava has no other friends. Deborah later admits to Ava that she also did not have friends despite her popularity, which is why she was close with her fans until she met Ava. Following the Little Debbies' relentless campaigning, Amanda gives in and sets Deborah's MSG show for September 11, the only available date.
40	3	"No New Tricks"	Paul W. Downs	Aisha Muharrar	April 23, 2026
Deborah attends a party for rock star Nico Hayes' residency at the Palmetto. An admirer of Deborah, Nico asks her out; Deborah is skeptical but agrees as it would be good publicity for her Madison Square Garden show and leaks the information to a paparazzo. Deborah finds a genuine connection to Nico and invites him to Marty's wedding the following week, but he dumps her after discovering she tipped off the paparazzi about their first date. Ava attends the wedding with Eli, a sex worker whom she met at Nico's party. Ava supports Eli's sex work but not his dreams of becoming a magician, so he dumps her and quits sex work. Marty's wedding is raided by the FBI who arrest his bride for fraud. Deborah consoles Marty, who proposes to her instead; she rejects, but his willingness to still take risks in love inspires her to propose reuniting in business with Marcus after previously cautioning against his plan to buy and restore one of Marty's old casinos, and offers to be co-owner. Nico posts a diss song about Deborah, which has his fans attacking her online. Ava convinces Deborah that it can be used as material and publicity for her show instead.
41	4	"Who's Making Dinner?"	Lucia Aniello	Samantha Riley	April 30, 2026
Deborah tries out new material for her show at home in front of her team but falls flat by emphasizing weight over levity. Former-streaming-exec-turned-producer Jessica Duncan loves Ava's Mall Girl script but offers to develop any idea Ava has that is more familiar instead of original. At the opening of the Paley Center exhibition in Los Angeles celebrating fifty years of Deborah's breakthrough sitcom Who's Making Dinner?, she becomes agitated by how much credit her late ex-husband Frank has been given over her for the show's success. She gives an unplanned speech that roasts Frank, which also falls flat, before overhearing a previously unreleased Frank interview where he attributes the show's success to Deborah, which leaves her crestfallen at still needing Frank's validation. Deborah is arrested for violating her restraining order via her speech, which was live-streamed, and entertains her fellow female cellmates while waiting for bail posted by Ava, who has brainstormed with Jimmy the idea of rebooting Who's Making Dinner? with a fresh premise. Realizing that simply being funny is what matters most in comedy, Deborah bails out all of her cellmates and takes them for dinner and further material testing.
42	5	"D'Amazing Race"	Jeff Rosenberg	Pat Regan	April 30, 2026
DJ secures a spot to compete in the upcoming celebrity season of The Amazing Race and insists that Deborah be her partner. Deborah accepts, intending to use their appearance to help promote her show when it airs after her restraining order expires. However, Trisha Paytas' participation brings out Deborah's competitive streak, which she takes out on DJ. Meanwhile, Ava has Jessica Duncan's approval and Deborah's blessing to reboot Who's Making Dinner? but has to obtain the rights from Kathy, Deborah's estranged sister and Frank's widow. Kathy offers the rights in exchange for Deborah relinquishing an antique salt and pepper shaker set that was a gift from their mother. Deborah refuses, so Ava secretly steals the shakers and has Deborah's rival antique collector T.L. Gurley make forgeries in exchange for Marcus buying his wares to furnish the Diva, Marcus and Deborah's new hotel and casino. Ava gives Kathy the forged shakers, and Kathy signs over the Who's Making Dinner? rights. DJ and Deborah are eliminated early from The Amazing Race, but it brings them closer together to the point where Deborah is now supportive of DJ selling her jewelry on QVC.
43	6	"QuikScribbl"	Jen Statsky	Carolyn Lipka & Joe Mande	May 7, 2026
Deborah tasks Jimmy and Kayla with finding a headliner to secure advance ticket sales to help fund the development of the Diva. After failing to sign famous comic Bruno Fox through Kayla's father's (Michael) firm, they fly to Kalamazoo and pitch the offer to Bruno directly at one of his shows. Bruno accepts but later confesses to a fatal hit-and-run, prompting Jimmy and Kayla to convince him to confess his crime. Meanwhile, Marcus finds a potential investor for the Diva, Graham Sweeney, a venture capitalist interested in using Deborah and Ava's creative work to train his new LLM generative AI model, QuikScribbl. Ava rejects the AI deal on principle, but Deborah agrees to license her solo work to secure the funding. However, Deborah soon backs out of the deal after Graham suggests she will eventually use the model to write her own jokes, which she views as an insult to her creative process. Deborah decides to scale down renovations at The Diva and informs Jimmy that a headliner is no longer needed. Upon Jimmy and Kayla's return, a disgruntled Michael retaliates by taking away Kayla's Porsche, trust fund, and office space.
44	7	"Montecito"	Paul W. Downs	Guy Branum & Andrew Law & Bridget Parker	May 7, 2026
After psychic Diana convinces Deborah she must wear the Bob Mackie-designed jumpsuit from the last episode of The Carol Burnett Show for her Madison Square Garden show, she reaches out to comedy peer and current owner Kelly Kilpatrick, who resents Deborah for mocking her coming out. Thinking Deborah and Ava are a couple, Kelly warms up and invites Deborah to spend the weekend at her Montecito home; Deborah goes along with the misunderstanding to get the jumpsuit. Only being told upon arrival the reason for visiting, and wary about Deborah's dishonesty on her recent whereabouts, Ava acts up by oversharing about her and Deborah's fake sex life, coercing Deborah into kissing her, and flirting with Monica who is in an open marriage with Kelly. When Deborah and Ava argue at bedtime, Kelly and Monica intervene, thinking Ava's arm injury inflicted in a self-driving car accident is actually a sign of domestic abuse. The next morning, Deborah admits to Ava that she had gone away for a medical procedure and did not want to worry Ava. Deborah and Ava come clean to Kelly and Monica, who let Deborah have the jumpsuit but tell them to leave, disgusted by what they perceive as Deborah's denial about being gay.
45	8	"The Cube"	Lucia Aniello	Genevieve Aniello & Jess Dweck	May 14, 2026
Deborah's Madison Square Garden show promotional stunt of volunteering in the Amazing Stephen's magic trick goes awry due to a city-wide outage and leaves her stuck all night in a suspended glass box above the Las Vegas Strip as Ava accompanies her via walkie-talkie. Jimmy and Kayla confront Michael at Latitude after he evicts them from their office and sues them for emotional distress; he offers to drop the lawsuit in exchange for absorbing their agency Schaeffer and LuSaque into Latitude. Kayla refuses, but Jimmy convinces her that it's best for their clients. Despite their car running out of power en route from Los Angeles, they reach Las Vegas in time for Deborah to draw attention for the show by feigning endangerment with Mayor Jo and a TV crew's help; tickets sell out in 10 minutes and Deborah invites Ava on vacation. At Latitude, Michael assures Jimmy that Kayla, Randi and their clients will be taken care of but has him work in the mailroom, with a Variety cover headline on Deborah selling out MSG and returning to Latitude adding insult to injury.
46	9	"The Garden"	Lucia Aniello	Lucia Aniello & Paul W. Downs & Jen Statsky	May 21, 2026
To calm down amidst preparations for Madison Square Garden, Deborah has Marty fly in from Las Vegas for a booty call. Ava's Who's Making Dinner? reboot pitch about Gen Z roommates is rejected for being too impersonal, so Ava rewrites it inspired by her and Deborah's cross-generational friendship. MSG is suspiciously quiet on show day because Bob Lipka bought all the tickets as revenge for his humiliation from her talk show fallout. Bob offers her a lucrative NDA to never speak publicly of him. Deborah refuses and decides to do a stripped-down free show in Central Park that weekend. They get to use the stage from the previous night's concert that was run by Weed, who is grateful to Deborah for firing her as tour manager, as it ultimately led to her recovery; they get a permit when the Parks Department clerk discovers Jimmy produces Renee O'Connor's Xena: Warrior Princess podcast; Deborah offers Marty, who has been fired from the Palmetto, a job running the Diva, which he accepts. On show day, Ava's new pitch receives a pilot order; Deborah thanks her team and walks onstage in front of a record crowd of 30,000.
47	10	"Hacks"	Lucia Aniello	Lucia Aniello & Paul W. Downs & Jen Statsky	May 28, 2026
Ava shoots the pilot for Who's Making Dinner; Deborah and Marcus open the Diva, which now employs Marty, Kiki, Josefina and Damien; Jimmy puts up with humiliation in the Latitude mailroom. Deborah confesses to Ava she has cancer and refuses to be treated, and that after their Paris vacation they'll head to Zurich for Deborah's assisted suicide. Ava refuses to participate and confides in Jimmy, who already knows and convinces her to go with Deborah. Jimmy blackmails Michael into giving up Latitude to him and Kayla after discovering via his mailroom work that Michael had been embezzling from the company; half the employees quit but the rest support Jimmy's new vision for Latitude. Deborah and Ava enjoy Paris, and Ava makes one last attempt to change Deborah's mind because she's scared of losing her but Deborah refuses. Ava relents, and while waiting to board their train to Zurich, she and Deborah riff on jokes about dying. Inspired, Deborah stops Ava from boarding and asks her to help write one last hour-long comedy special. Ava accepts, and Deborah starts treatment in Las Vegas as they work on jokes together again.

== Production ==
In May 2020, HBO Max announced that it had picked up the series and that Jean Smart would star. Additional casting was announced in February 2021. Because of the COVID-19 pandemic, actors held table reads over Zoom, there were no cast parties during production, and stars Smart and Clemons-Hopkins did not even meet each other in person until minutes before the pilot was filmed. In June 2021, HBO Max renewed the series for a second season, and the cast added Laurie Metcalf, Martha Kelly, and Ming-Na Wen in recurring roles and Margaret Cho as a guest star.

In June 2022, HBO Max renewed the series for a third season. In September 2022, the showrunners revealed that a time jump would take place between the second and third season. Production began for the third season in November 2022, but paused near the end of February 2023 for a few weeks before resuming in March due to Smart recovering from a "successful heart procedure". Production shut down in May 2023 due to the 2023 Writers Guild of America strike. Megan Stalter and Paul W. Downs were promoted to series regulars in the third season after having recurring roles since the first season. In February 2024, it was announced Helen Hunt, Christina Hendricks, Christopher Lloyd, Dan Bucatinsky, George Wallace and Tony Goldwyn would guest star in the third season. In March and April 2024, Aristotle Athari and J. Smith-Cameron were respectively announced to guest star in the third season. In May 2024, Max renewed the series for a fourth season. The fourth season began filming in October 2024 and wrapped in January 2025. In May 2025, Max renewed the series for a fifth season, which was confirmed to be the final season at the 2025 Emmy Awards.

== Release ==
Hacks premiered on May 13, 2021, with a two-episode release. Two episodes were released on a weekly basis through June 10, 2021, for the remainder of the 10-episode first season. The second season premiered on May 12, 2022, with a two-episode release weekly. The second season of Hacks premiered on Amazon Prime Video in the United Kingdom on April 1, 2022. The third season premiered on May 2, 2024. Two episodes were released weekly through May 30.

The first season was released on Blu-ray on June 14, 2022. In May 2026, the creators of the series expressed their plans on releasing the complete series on physical media, because "It's such an important time for people to invest in physical media". In August 2026, it was announced the complete series would be released on Blu-ray later that year. The following month, it was confirmed the set would release on December 8, 2026, and feature over 4 hours of bonus features. In November 2026, it was announced the series would be released on 4K Blu-ray on March 2, 2027.

== Reception ==
=== Critical response ===
Critical response of Hacks
Season	Rotten Tomatoes	Metacritic
1	100% (74 reviews)	82 (25 reviews)
2	100% (54 reviews)	88 (24 reviews)
3	98% (50 reviews)	90 (22 reviews)
4	98% (42 reviews)	91 (20 reviews)
5	97% (37 reviews)	88 (15 reviews)

All five seasons of Hacks have received critical acclaim. On the review aggregation website Rotten Tomatoes, the overall series holds a 98% rating. Meanwhile, on Metacritic, which uses a weighted average, the overall series received a score of 87 out of 100.

==== Season 1 ====
The review aggregator Rotten Tomatoes reported an approval rating for the first season of 100% based on 74 critic reviews. The website's critical consensus states, "A prickling debut that pulls few punches, Hacks deftly balances its sharp critiques of the comedy world with more intimate moments, all the while giving the incomparable Jean Smart a role worthy of her talents – and an excellent partner in Hannah Einbinder." Metacritic calculated a weighted average score of 82 out of 100 based on 25 critics.

==== Season 2 ====
On Rotten Tomatoes, the second season also received an approval rating of 100% based on 54 critic reviews. The website's critics consensus states, "Hacks hits the road, but Jean Smart and Hannah Einbinder remain very much at home with each other in a sterling sophomore season that finds novel ways to deepen the central pair's lovable friendship." Metacritic calculated a weighted average score of 88 out of 100 based on 24 critics.

==== Season 3 ====
The third season received an approval rating of 98% based on 50 critic reviews on Rotten Tomatoes. The website's critics consensus states, "Reuniting never felt so good – Hacks roars back with a fresh set and a persuasive argument for its own longevity." Metacritic calculated a weighted average score of 90 out of 100 based on 22 critics.

==== Season 4 ====
The fourth season received an approval rating of 98% based on 42 critic reviews on Rotten Tomatoes. The website's critics consensus states, "Pitting Jean Smart and Hannah Einbinder's dynamic duo against each other on the mountaintop of success, Hacks finds fresh ways to mine comedic gold from one of television's most compelling relationships." Metacritic calculated a weighted average score of 91 out of 100 based on 20 critics.

==== Season 5 ====
The fifth and final season received an approval rating of 97% based on 37 critic reviews on Rotten Tomatoes. The website's critics consensus states, "Hacks takes a triumphant bow with a final season that keeps the pace and jokes right on par with its previous installments, bidding farewell to Deborah Vance and Ava Daniels with all the flair and care this world has to offer." Metacritic calculated a weighted average score of 88 out of 100 based on 15 critics.

=== Awards and nominations ===
Awards and nominations received by Hacks
Award	Year	Category	Nominee(s)	Result	Ref.
AACTA International Awards	2022	Best Comedy Series	Hacks	Nominated	
AACTA International Awards	2022	Best Actress in a Series	Jean Smart	Nominated	
AACTA International Awards	2023	Best Comedy Series	Hacks	Nominated	
AACTA International Awards	2023	Best Actress in a Series	Jean Smart	Nominated	
AACTA International Awards	2025	Best Comedy Series	Hacks	Nominated	
AACTA International Awards	2025	Best Actress in a Series	Jean Smart	Nominated	
AACTA International Awards	2026	Best Comedy Series	Hacks	Nominated	
AACTA International Awards	2026	Best Actress in a Series	Jean Smart	Nominated	
Actor Awards	2022	Outstanding Performance by an Ensemble in a Comedy Series	Rose Abdoo, Carl Clemons-Hopkins, Paul W. Downs, Hannah Einbinder, Mark Indelicato, Poppy Liu, Christopher McDonald, Jean Smart, and Megan Stalter	Nominated	
Actor Awards	2022	Outstanding Performance by a Female Actor in a Comedy Series	Jean Smart	Won	
Actor Awards	2023	Outstanding Performance by an Ensemble in a Comedy Series	Carl Clemons-Hopkins, Paul W. Downs, Hannah Einbinder, Mark Indelicato, Jean Smart, and Megan Stalter	Nominated	
Actor Awards	2023	Outstanding Performance by a Female Actor in a Comedy Series	Jean Smart	Won	
Actor Awards	2025	Outstanding Performance by an Ensemble in a Comedy Series	Rose Abdoo, Carl Clemons-Hopkins, Paul W. Downs, Hannah Einbinder, Mark Indelicato, Jean Smart, and Megan Stalter	Nominated	
Actor Awards	2025	Outstanding Performance by a Female Actor in a Comedy Series	Jean Smart	Won	
Actor Awards	2026	Outstanding Performance by an Ensemble in a Comedy Series	Rose Abdoo, Dan Bucatinsky, Carl Clemons-Hopkins, Paul W. Downs, Hannah Einbinder, Mark Indelicato, Jean Smart, Megan Stalter, and Michaela Watkins	Nominated	
Actor Awards	2026	Outstanding Performance by a Female Actor in a Comedy Series	Jean Smart	Nominated	
American Cinema Editors Awards	2022	Best Edited Comedy Series	Susan Vaill (for "1.69 Million")	Won	
American Cinema Editors Awards	2026	Best Edited Comedy Series	Susan Vaill (for "I Love LA")	Nominated	
American Film Institute Awards	2021	Top 10 Programs of the Year	Hacks	Won	
American Film Institute Awards	2022	Top 10 Programs of the Year	Hacks	Won	
American Film Institute Awards	2024	Top 10 Programs of the Year	Hacks	Won	
American Society of Cinematographers Awards	2022	Outstanding Achievement in Cinematography in an Episode of a Half-Hour Television Series	Adam Bricker (for "There is No Line")	Nominated	
American Society of Cinematographers Awards	2023	Outstanding Achievement in Cinematography in an Episode of a Half-Hour Television Series	Adam Bricker (for "The Click")	Nominated	
American Society of Cinematographers Awards	2025	Outstanding Achievement in Cinematography in an Episode of a Half-Hour Television Series	Adam Bricker (for "Just for Laughs")	Nominated	
American Society of Cinematographers Awards	2026	Outstanding Achievement in Cinematography in an Episode of a Half-Hour Television Series	Adam Bricker (for "I Love LA")	Nominated	
Art Directors Guild Awards	2022	Excellence in Production Design for a Half Hour Single-Camera Television Series	Jon Carlos (for "Primm")	Nominated	
Art Directors Guild Awards	2023	Excellence in Production Design for a Half Hour Single-Camera Television Series	Alec Contestabile (for "Trust the Process")	Nominated	
Art Directors Guild Awards	2025	Excellence in Production Design for a Half Hour Single-Camera Television Series	Daniel Novotny (for "Just For Laughs" and "Better Late")	Nominated	
Art Directors Guild Awards	2026	Excellence in Production Design for a Half Hour Single-Camera Television Series	Daniel Novotny (for "A Slippery Slope")	Nominated	
Artios Awards	2022	Outstanding Achievement in Casting – Television Comedy Series	Jeanne McCarthy, Nicole Abellera Hallman, and Anna Mayworm	Nominated	
Artios Awards	2023	Outstanding Achievement in Casting – Television Comedy Series	Jeanne McCarthy, Nicole Abellera Hallman, and Anna Mayworm	Won	
Artios Awards	2025	Outstanding Achievement in Casting – Television Comedy Series	Nicole Abellera Hallman, Jeanne McCarthy, and Anna Mayworm	Won	
Artios Awards	2026	Outstanding Achievement in Casting – Television Comedy Series	Linda Lowy	Won	
Astra TV Awards (Note: Previously known as Hollywood Critics Association TV Awards.)	2021	Best Streaming Series, Comedy	Hacks	Nominated	
Astra TV Awards	2021	Best Actress in a Streaming Series, Comedy	Jean Smart	Won	
Astra TV Awards	2021	Best Supporting Actress in a Streaming Series, Comedy	Hannah Einbinder	Won (Note: Tied with Hannah Waddingham for Ted Lasso)	
Astra TV Awards	2021	Best Supporting Actress in a Streaming Series, Comedy	Kaitlin Olson	Nominated	
Astra TV Awards	2022	Best Streaming Series, Comedy	Hacks	Nominated	
Astra TV Awards	2022	Best Actress in a Streaming Series, Comedy	Jean Smart	Nominated	
Astra TV Awards	2022	Best Supporting Actor in a Streaming Series, Comedy	Paul W. Downs	Nominated	
Astra TV Awards	2022	Best Supporting Actress in a Streaming Series, Comedy	Hannah Einbinder	Won	
Astra TV Awards	2022	Best Directing in a Streaming Series, Comedy	Lucia Aniello (for "There Will Be Blood")	Won	
Astra TV Awards	2022	Best Writing in a Streaming Series, Comedy	Lucia Aniello, Paul W. Downs, and Jen Statsky (for "The One, The Only")	Won	
Astra TV Awards	2024	Best Streaming Series, Comedy	Hacks	Won	
Astra TV Awards	2024	Best Actress in a Streaming Series, Comedy	Jean Smart	Won	
Astra TV Awards	2024	Best Supporting Actor in a Streaming Series, Comedy	Carl Clemons-Hopkins	Nominated	
Astra TV Awards	2024	Best Supporting Actor in a Streaming Series, Comedy	Paul W. Downs	Nominated	
Astra TV Awards	2024	Best Supporting Actress in a Streaming Series, Comedy	Hannah Einbinder	Won	
Astra TV Awards	2024	Best Supporting Actress in a Streaming Series, Comedy	Meg Stalter	Nominated	
Astra TV Awards	2024	Best Guest Actor in a Streaming Series, Comedy	Christopher Lloyd	Nominated	
Astra TV Awards	2024	Best Guest Actor in a Streaming Series, Comedy	Christopher McDonald	Nominated	
Astra TV Awards	2024	Best Guest Actress in a Streaming Series, Comedy	Christina Hendricks	Nominated	
Astra TV Awards	2024	Best Guest Actress in a Streaming Series, Comedy	Kaitlin Olson	Nominated	
Astra TV Awards	2024	Best Directing in a Streaming Series, Comedy	Lucia Aniello (for "Bulletproof")	Nominated	
Astra TV Awards	2024	Best Writing in a Streaming Series, Comedy	Lucia Aniello, Paul W. Downs, and Jen Statsky (for "Bulletproof")	Won	
Astra TV Awards	2024	Best Short Form	Hacks: Bit by Bit	Nominated	
Astra TV Awards	2025	Best Comedy Series	Hacks	Nominated	
Astra TV Awards	2025	Best Actress in a Comedy Series	Jean Smart	Nominated	
Astra TV Awards	2025	Best Supporting Actor in a Comedy Series	Paul W. Downs	Nominated	
Astra TV Awards	2025	Best Supporting Actress in a Comedy Series	Hannah Einbinder	Nominated	
Astra TV Awards	2025	Best Supporting Actress in a Comedy Series	Meg Stalter	Nominated	
Astra TV Awards	2025	Best Guest Actor in a Comedy Series	Christopher McDonald	Nominated	
Astra TV Awards	2025	Best Guest Actress in a Comedy Series	Kaitlin Olson	Nominated	
Astra TV Awards	2025	Best Cast Ensemble in a Streaming Comedy Series	Hacks	Nominated	
Astra TV Awards	2025	Best Directing in a Comedy Series	Lucia Aniello (for "A Slippery Slope")	Nominated	
Astra TV Awards	2025	Best Writing in a Streaming Series, Comedy	Lucia Aniello, Paul W. Downs, and Jen Statsky (for "A Slippery Slope")	Won	
Astra TV Awards	2026	Best Comedy Series	Hacks	Won	
Astra TV Awards	2026	Best Actress in a Comedy Series	Jean Smart	Won	
Astra TV Awards	2026	Best Supporting Actor in a Comedy Series	Paul W. Downs	Nominated	
Astra TV Awards	2026	Best Supporting Actress in a Comedy Series	Hannah Einbinder	Won	
Astra TV Awards	2026	Best Guest Actor in a Comedy Series	Christopher McDonald	Nominated	
Astra TV Awards	2026	Best Guest Actress in a Comedy Series	Cherry Jones	Nominated	
Astra TV Awards	2026	Best Guest Actress in a Comedy Series	Kaitlin Olson	Nominated	
Astra TV Awards	2026	Best Streaming Comedy Ensemble	Hacks	Nominated	
Astra TV Awards	2026	Best Directing in a Comedy Series	Hacks	Won	
Astra TV Awards	2026	Best Writing in a Streaming Series, Comedy	Hacks	Nominated	
Cinema Audio Society Awards	2025	Outstanding Achievement in Sound Mixing for Television Series – Half Hour	Jim Lakin, John W. Cook II, Ben Wilkins, Fernanda Domene, and Jacob McNaughton (for "Bulletproof")	Nominated	
Cinema Audio Society Awards	2026	Outstanding Achievement in Sound Mixing for Television Series – Half Hour	Jim Lakin, John W. Cook II, James Parnell, David Stal, Fernanda Domene, and Jacob McNaughton (for "I Love LA")	Nominated	
Costume Designers Guild Awards	2022	Excellence in Contemporary Television	Kathleen Felix-Hager (for "There is No Line")	Nominated	
Costume Designers Guild Awards	2023	Excellence in Contemporary Television	Kathleen Felix-Hager (for "The Captain's Wife")	Nominated	
Costume Designers Guild Awards	2025	Excellence in Contemporary Television	Kathleen Felix-Hager (for "Just for Laughs")	Won	
Costume Designers Guild Awards	2026	Excellence in Contemporary Television	Kathleen Felix-Hager (for "Heaven")	Nominated	
Critics' Choice Television Awards	2022	Best Comedy Series	Hacks	Nominated	
Critics' Choice Television Awards	2022	Best Actress in a Comedy Series	Jean Smart	Won	
Critics' Choice Television Awards	2022	Best Supporting Actress in a Comedy Series	Hannah Einbinder	Nominated	
Critics' Choice Television Awards	2023	Best Comedy Series	Hacks	Nominated	
Critics' Choice Television Awards	2023	Best Actress in a Comedy Series	Jean Smart	Won	
Critics' Choice Television Awards	2025	Best Comedy Series	Hacks	Won	
Critics' Choice Television Awards	2025	Best Actress in a Comedy Series	Jean Smart	Won	
Critics' Choice Television Awards	2025	Best Supporting Actor in a Comedy Series	Paul W. Downs	Nominated	
Critics' Choice Television Awards	2025	Best Supporting Actress in a Comedy Series	Hannah Einbinder	Won	
Critics' Choice Television Awards	2026	Best Comedy Series	Hacks	Nominated	
Critics' Choice Television Awards	2026	Best Actress in a Comedy Series	Jean Smart	Won	
Critics' Choice Television Awards	2026	Best Supporting Actor in a Comedy Series	Paul W. Downs	Nominated	
Critics' Choice Television Awards	2026	Best Supporting Actress in a Comedy Series	Hannah Einbinder	Nominated	
Directors Guild of America Awards	2022	Outstanding Directorial Achievement in Comedy Series	Lucia Aniello (for "There Is No Line")	Won	
Directors Guild of America Awards	2025	Outstanding Directorial Achievement in Comedy Series	Lucia Aniello (for "Bulletproof")	Won	
Directors Guild of America Awards	2026	Outstanding Directorial Achievement in Comedy Series	Lucia Aniello (for "A Slippery Slope")	Nominated	
Dorian TV Awards	2021	Best TV Comedy	Hacks	Won	
Dorian TV Awards	2021	Best TV Performance	Jean Smart	Won	
Dorian TV Awards	2022	Best TV Comedy	Hacks	Nominated	
Dorian TV Awards	2022	Best LGBTQ TV Show	Hacks	Nominated	
Dorian TV Awards	2022	Best TV Performance	Jean Smart	Nominated	
Dorian TV Awards	2022	Best Supporting TV Performance	Hannah Einbinder	Nominated	
Dorian TV Awards	2022	Best TV Musical Performance	Jean Smart (for "(You Make Me Feel Like) A Natural Woman")	Nominated	
Dorian TV Awards	2024	Best TV Comedy	Hacks	Won	
Dorian TV Awards	2024	Best LGBTQ TV Show	Hacks	Nominated	
Dorian TV Awards	2024	Best Written TV Show	Hacks	Won	
Dorian TV Awards	2024	Best TV Performance – Comedy	Jean Smart	Won	
Dorian TV Awards	2024	Best Supporting TV Performance – Comedy	Hannah Einbinder	Won	
Dorian TV Awards	2024	Best Supporting TV Performance – Comedy	Megan Stalter	Nominated	
Dorian TV Awards	2025	Best TV Comedy	Hacks	Won	
Dorian TV Awards	2025	Best LGBTQ TV Show	Hacks	Won	
Dorian TV Awards	2025	Best Written TV Show	Hacks	Won	
Dorian TV Awards	2025	Best TV Performance – Comedy	Jean Smart	Won	
Dorian TV Awards	2025	Best Supporting TV Performance – Comedy	Hannah Einbinder	Won	
Dorian TV Awards	2025	Best Supporting TV Performance – Comedy	Megan Stalter	Nominated	
Dorian TV Awards	2026	Best TV Comedy	Hacks	Won	
Dorian TV Awards	2026	Best LGBTQ TV Show	Hacks	Nominated	
Dorian TV Awards	2026	Best Written TV Show	Hacks	Won	
Dorian TV Awards	2026	Best TV Performance – Comedy	Jean Smart	Won	
Dorian TV Awards	2026	Best Supporting TV Performance – Comedy	Leslie Bibb	Nominated	
Dorian TV Awards	2026	Best Supporting TV Performance – Comedy	Paul W. Downs	Nominated	
Dorian TV Awards	2026	Best Supporting TV Performance – Comedy	Hannah Einbinder	Nominated	
Dorian TV Awards	2026	Best Supporting TV Performance – Comedy	Megan Stalter	Nominated	
GLAAD Media Awards	2022	Outstanding New TV Series	Hacks	Won	
GLAAD Media Awards	2023	Outstanding Comedy Series	Hacks	Nominated	
GLAAD Media Awards	2025	Outstanding Comedy Series	Hacks	Won	
GLAAD Media Awards	2026	Outstanding Comedy Series	Hacks	Nominated	
Golden Globe Awards	2022	Best Television Series – Musical or Comedy	Hacks	Won	
Golden Globe Awards	2022	Best Actress in a Television Series – Musical or Comedy	Hannah Einbinder	Nominated	
Golden Globe Awards	2022	Best Actress in a Television Series – Musical or Comedy	Jean Smart	Won	
Golden Globe Awards	2023	Best Television Series – Musical or Comedy	Hacks	Nominated	
Golden Globe Awards	2023	Best Actress in a Television Series – Musical or Comedy	Jean Smart	Nominated	
Golden Globe Awards	2023	Best Supporting Actress in a Television Series – Comedy/Musical or Drama	Hannah Einbinder	Nominated	
Golden Globe Awards	2025	Best Television Series – Musical or Comedy	Hacks	Won	
Golden Globe Awards	2025	Best Actress in a Television Series – Musical or Comedy	Jean Smart	Won	
Golden Globe Awards	2025	Best Supporting Actress – Television	Hannah Einbinder	Nominated	
Golden Globe Awards	2026	Best Television Series – Musical or Comedy	Hacks	Nominated	
Golden Globe Awards	2026	Best Actress in a Television Series – Musical or Comedy	Jean Smart	Won	
Golden Globe Awards	2026	Best Supporting Actress – Television	Hannah Einbinder	Nominated	
Golden Reel Awards	2022	Outstanding Achievement in Sound Editing – 1/2 Hour – Comedy or Drama	Brett Hinton, Marc Glassman, Ryne Gierke, Samuel Munoz, Noel Vought, and Jason Tregoe Newman (for "There Is No Line")	Nominated	
Gotham Awards	2021	Breakthrough Series – Short Format	Hacks	Nominated	
Gotham Awards	2021	Outstanding Performance in a New Series	Jean Smart	Nominated	
Make-Up Artists and Hair Stylists Guild Awards	2023	Best Contemporary Make-Up in a Television Series, Television Limited or Miniseries or Television New Media Series	Bridget O'Neill	Nominated	
Make-Up Artists and Hair Stylists Guild Awards	2025	Best Contemporary Make-Up in a Television Series, Television Limited or Miniseries or Television New Media Series	Debra Schrey, Erin Rosemann Good, Rachel Galey, Denise DellaValle, and Keith Sayer	Nominated	
Make-Up Artists and Hair Stylists Guild Awards	2025	Best Contemporary Hair Styling in a Television Series, Television Limited or Miniseries or Television New Media Series	Aubrey Marie, Jennifer Bell, Becca Weber, and Portia Arikawe	Nominated	
NAACP Image Awards	2023	Outstanding Writing in a Comedy Series	Aisha Muharrar	Nominated	
Peabody Awards	2022	Entertainment	Hacks	Won	
Primetime Emmy Awards	2021	Outstanding Comedy Series	Jen Statsky, Paul W. Downs, Lucia Aniello, Michael Schur, David Miner, Morgan Sackett, Joanna Calo, Andrew Law, David Hyman, Joe Mande, and Jessica Chaffin	Nominated	
Primetime Emmy Awards	2021	Outstanding Lead Actress in a Comedy Series	Jean Smart (for "1.69 Million")	Won	
Primetime Emmy Awards	2021	Outstanding Supporting Actor in a Comedy Series	Carl Clemons-Hopkins (for "New Eyes")	Nominated	
Primetime Emmy Awards	2021	Outstanding Supporting Actress in a Comedy Series	Hannah Einbinder (for "I Think She Will")	Nominated	
Primetime Emmy Awards	2021	Outstanding Directing for a Comedy Series	Lucia Aniello (for "There Is No Line")	Won	
Primetime Emmy Awards	2021	Outstanding Writing for a Comedy Series	Lucia Aniello, Paul W. Downs, and Jen Statsky (for "There Is No Line")	Won	
Primetime Emmy Awards	2022	Outstanding Comedy Series	Jen Statsky, Lucia Aniello, Paul W. Downs, Michael Schur, David Miner, Morgan Sackett, Joe Mande, Andrew Law, Aisha Muharrar, Ashley Glazier, Samantha Riley, Seth Edelstein, and Jessica Chaffin	Nominated	
Primetime Emmy Awards	2022	Outstanding Lead Actress in a Comedy Series	Jean Smart (for "The Click")	Won	
Primetime Emmy Awards	2022	Outstanding Supporting Actress in a Comedy Series	Hannah Einbinder (for "The Captain's Wife")	Nominated	
Primetime Emmy Awards	2022	Outstanding Directing for a Comedy Series	Lucia Aniello (for "There Will Be Blood")	Nominated	
Primetime Emmy Awards	2022	Outstanding Writing for a Comedy Series	Lucia Aniello, Paul W. Downs, and Jen Statsky (for "The One, the Only")	Nominated	
Primetime Emmy Awards	2024	Outstanding Comedy Series	Jen Statsky, Paul W. Downs, Lucia Aniello, Michael Schur, David Miner, Morgan Sackett, Guy Branum, Andrew Law, Carol Leifer, Joe Mande, Aisha Muharrar, Samantha Riley, Ashley Glazier, and Nate Young	Won	
Primetime Emmy Awards	2024	Outstanding Lead Actress in a Comedy Series	Jean Smart (for "Yes, And")	Won	
Primetime Emmy Awards	2024	Outstanding Supporting Actress in a Comedy Series	Hannah Einbinder (for "Bulletproof")	Nominated	
Primetime Emmy Awards	2024	Outstanding Supporting Actor in a Comedy Series	Paul W. Downs (for "Bulletproof")	Nominated	
Primetime Emmy Awards	2024	Outstanding Directing for a Comedy Series	Lucia Aniello (for "Bulletproof")	Nominated	
Primetime Emmy Awards	2024	Outstanding Writing for a Comedy Series	Lucia Aniello, Paul W. Downs, and Jen Statsky (for "Bulletproof")	Won	
Primetime Emmy Awards	2025	Outstanding Comedy Series	Jen Statsky, Paul W. Downs, Lucia Aniello, Michael Schur, David Miner, Morgan Sackett, Joe Mande, Andrew Law, Samantha Riley, Aisha Muharrar, Pat Regan, Ashley Glazier, Jeff Rosenberg, Adam Bricker, and Nate Young	Nominated	
Primetime Emmy Awards	2025	Outstanding Lead Actress in a Comedy Series	Jean Smart (for "I Love LA")	Won	
Primetime Emmy Awards	2025	Outstanding Supporting Actress in a Comedy Series	Hannah Einbinder (for "Mrs. Table")	Won	
Primetime Emmy Awards	2025	Outstanding Directing for a Comedy Series	Lucia Aniello (for "A Slippery Slope")	Nominated	
Primetime Emmy Awards	2025	Outstanding Writing for a Comedy Series	Lucia Aniello, Paul W. Downs, and Jen Statsky (for "A Slippery Slope")	Nominated	
Primetime Emmy Awards	2026	Outstanding Comedy Series	Jen Statsky, Lucia Aniello, Paul W. Downs, Michael Schur, David Miner, Morgan Sackett, Joe Mande, Aisha Muharrar, Nate Young, Ashley Glazier, Guy Branum, Andrew Law, Pat Regan, Samantha Riley, Ariel Karlin, Adam Bricker, Jeff Rosenberg, and Nicholas Perez	Nominated	
Primetime Emmy Awards	2026	Outstanding Lead Actress in a Comedy Series	Jean Smart (for "Hacks")	Won	
Primetime Emmy Awards	2026	Outstanding Supporting Actor in a Comedy Series	Paul W. Downs	Nominated	
Primetime Emmy Awards	2026	Outstanding Supporting Actress in a Comedy Series	Hannah Einbinder (for "Hacks")	Nominated	
Primetime Emmy Awards	2026	Outstanding Supporting Actress in a Comedy Series	Megan Stalter	Nominated	
Primetime Emmy Awards	2026	Outstanding Directing for a Comedy Series	Lucia Aniello (for "Hacks")	Nominated	
Primetime Emmy Awards	2026	Outstanding Writing for a Comedy Series	Lucia Aniello, Paul W. Downs, and Jen Statsky (for "Hacks")	Nominated	
Primetime Creative Arts Emmy Awards	2021	Outstanding Guest Actress in a Comedy Series	Jane Adams (for "I Think She Will")	Nominated	
Primetime Creative Arts Emmy Awards	2021	Outstanding Casting for a Comedy Series	Jeanne McCarthy and Nicole Abellera Hallman	Nominated	
Primetime Creative Arts Emmy Awards	2021	Outstanding Cinematography for a Single-Camera Series (Half-Hour)	Adam Bricker (for "Primm")	Nominated	
Primetime Creative Arts Emmy Awards	2021	Outstanding Contemporary Costumes	Kathleen Felix-Hager and Karen Bellamy (for "There Is No Line")	Nominated	
Primetime Creative Arts Emmy Awards	2021	Outstanding Single-Camera Picture Editing for a Comedy Series	Susan Vaill (for "Primm")	Nominated	
Primetime Creative Arts Emmy Awards	2021	Outstanding Single-Camera Picture Editing for a Comedy Series	Jessica Brunetto (for "There Is No Line")	Nominated	
Primetime Creative Arts Emmy Awards	2021	Outstanding Single-Camera Picture Editing for a Comedy Series	Ali Greer (for "Tunnel of Love")	Nominated	
Primetime Creative Arts Emmy Awards	2021	Outstanding Production Design for a Narrative Program (Half-Hour)	Jon Carlos, James Bolenbaugh, and Ellen Reede Dorros (for "Primm")	Nominated	
Primetime Creative Arts Emmy Awards	2021	Outstanding Sound Mixing for a Comedy or Drama Series (Half-Hour) and Animation	John W. Cook II, Ben Wilkins, and Jim Lakin (for "Falling")	Nominated	
Primetime Creative Arts Emmy Awards	2022	Outstanding Guest Actor in a Comedy Series	Christopher McDonald (for "The One, the Only")	Nominated	
Primetime Creative Arts Emmy Awards	2022	Outstanding Guest Actress in a Comedy Series	Jane Adams (for "The Click")	Nominated	
Primetime Creative Arts Emmy Awards	2022	Outstanding Guest Actress in a Comedy Series	Harriet Sansom Harris (for "Retired")	Nominated	
Primetime Creative Arts Emmy Awards	2022	Outstanding Guest Actress in a Comedy Series	Laurie Metcalf (for "Trust the Process")	Won	
Primetime Creative Arts Emmy Awards	2022	Outstanding Guest Actress in a Comedy Series	Kaitlin Olson (for "There Will Be Blood")	Nominated	
Primetime Creative Arts Emmy Awards	2022	Outstanding Casting for a Comedy Series	Jeanne McCarthy and Nicole Abellera Hallman	Nominated	
Primetime Creative Arts Emmy Awards	2022	Outstanding Cinematography for a Single-Camera Series (Half-Hour)	Adam Bricker (for "The Click")	Nominated	
Primetime Creative Arts Emmy Awards	2022	Outstanding Contemporary Costumes	Kathleen Felix-Hager and Karen Bellamy (for "The Captain's Wife")	Won	
Primetime Creative Arts Emmy Awards	2022	Outstanding Contemporary Hairstyling	Jennifer Bell (for "The Captain's Wife")	Nominated	
Primetime Creative Arts Emmy Awards	2022	Outstanding Production Design for a Narrative Program (Half-Hour)	Alec Contestabile, Rob Tokarz, and Jennifer Lukehart (for "Trust the Process")	Nominated	
Primetime Creative Arts Emmy Awards	2022	Outstanding Single-Camera Picture Editing for a Comedy Series	Jessica Brunetto (for "There Will Be Blood")	Nominated	
Primetime Creative Arts Emmy Awards	2022	Outstanding Sound Mixing for a Comedy or Drama Series (Half-Hour) and Animation	John W. Cook II, Ben Wilkins, and Jim Lakin (for "The Captain's Wife")	Nominated	
Primetime Creative Arts Emmy Awards	2024	Outstanding Guest Actor in a Comedy Series	Christopher Lloyd (for "The Deborah Vance Christmas Spectacular")	Nominated	
Primetime Creative Arts Emmy Awards	2024	Outstanding Guest Actress in a Comedy Series	Kaitlin Olson (for "The Roast of Deborah Vance")	Nominated	
Primetime Creative Arts Emmy Awards	2024	Outstanding Casting for a Comedy Series	Jeanne McCarthy and Nicole Abellera Hallman	Nominated	
Primetime Creative Arts Emmy Awards	2024	Outstanding Short Form Nonfiction or Reality Series	Hacks: Bit by Bit	Nominated	
Primetime Creative Arts Emmy Awards	2024	Outstanding Cinematography for a Single-Camera Series (Half-Hour)	Adam Bricker (for "Just for Laughs")	Nominated	
Primetime Creative Arts Emmy Awards	2024	Outstanding Contemporary Costumes	Kathleen Felix-Hager, Karen Bellamy, and Rory Cunningham (for "Just for Laughs")	Nominated	
Primetime Creative Arts Emmy Awards	2024	Outstanding Contemporary Hairstyling	Jennifer Bell (for "Yes, And")	Nominated	
Primetime Creative Arts Emmy Awards	2024	Outstanding Contemporary Makeup (Non-Prosthetic)	Keith Sayer (for "Yes, And")	Nominated	
Primetime Creative Arts Emmy Awards	2024	Outstanding Production Design for a Narrative Program (Half-Hour)	Rob Tokarz, Jeanine A. Ringer, and Jennifer Lukewart (for "Yes, And")	Nominated	
Primetime Creative Arts Emmy Awards	2024	Outstanding Single-Camera Picture Editing for a Comedy Series	Jessica Brunetto (for "The Deborah Vance Christmas Spectacular")	Nominated	
Primetime Creative Arts Emmy Awards	2024	Outstanding Sound Mixing for a Comedy or Drama Series (Half-Hour) and Animation	John W. Cook II, Ben Wilkins, and Jim Lakin (for "Just for Laughs")	Nominated	
Primetime Creative Arts Emmy Awards	2025	Outstanding Guest Actress in a Comedy Series	Robby Hoffman (for "Cover Girls")	Nominated	
Primetime Creative Arts Emmy Awards	2025	Outstanding Guest Actress in a Comedy Series	Julianne Nicholson (for "A Slippery Slope")	Won	
Primetime Creative Arts Emmy Awards	2025	Outstanding Casting for a Comedy Series	Linda Lowy and Morgan Smith	Nominated	
Primetime Creative Arts Emmy Awards	2025	Outstanding Short Form Nonfiction or Reality Series	Hacks: Bit by Bit	Nominated	
Primetime Creative Arts Emmy Awards	2025	Outstanding Cinematography for a Single-Camera Series (Half-Hour)	Adam Bricker (for "I Love LA")	Nominated	
Primetime Creative Arts Emmy Awards	2025	Outstanding Contemporary Costumes	Kathleen Felix-Hager, and Keely Crum (for "Heaven")	Nominated	
Primetime Creative Arts Emmy Awards	2025	Outstanding Contemporary Hairstyling	Aubrey Marie, Becca Weber, Marva Stokes, Alexis Sade Stafford, and Jennifer Bell (for "I Love LA")	Nominated	
Primetime Creative Arts Emmy Awards	2025	Outstanding Music Supervision	Matt Biffa (for "I Love LA")	Nominated	
Primetime Creative Arts Emmy Awards	2025	Outstanding Production Design for a Narrative Program (Half-Hour)	Rob Tokarz, Jeanine Ringer, and Jennifer Lukehart (for "A Slippery Slope")	Nominated	
Primetime Creative Arts Emmy Awards	2025	Outstanding Single-Camera Picture Editing for a Comedy Series	Jessica Brunetto (for "I Love LA")	Nominated	
Primetime Creative Arts Emmy Awards	2026	Outstanding Guest Actress in a Comedy Series	Leslie Bibb (for "Montecito")	Nominated	
Primetime Creative Arts Emmy Awards	2026	Outstanding Guest Actress in a Comedy Series	Cherry Jones (for "Montecito")	Nominated	
Primetime Creative Arts Emmy Awards	2026	Outstanding Guest Actress in a Comedy Series	Laurie Metcalf (for "The Garden")	Nominated	
Primetime Creative Arts Emmy Awards	2026	Outstanding Guest Actress in a Comedy Series	Kaitlin Olson (for "D'Amazing Race")	Nominated	
Primetime Creative Arts Emmy Awards	2026	Outstanding Guest Actress in a Comedy Series	Lauren Weedman (for "The Cube")	Nominated	
Primetime Creative Arts Emmy Awards	2026	Outstanding Guest Actor in a Comedy Series	Christopher McDonald (for "No New Tricks")	Nominated	
Primetime Creative Arts Emmy Awards	2026	Outstanding Casting for a Comedy Series	Linda Lowy, Morgan Smith, and Lily Trotter	Nominated	
Primetime Creative Arts Emmy Awards	2026	Outstanding Short Form Nonfiction or Reality Series	Hacks: Bit by Bit	Nominated	
Primetime Creative Arts Emmy Awards	2026	Outstanding Cinematography for a Single-Camera Series (Half-Hour)	Adam Bricker (for "The Garden")	Nominated	
Primetime Creative Arts Emmy Awards	2026	Outstanding Contemporary Costumes	Kathleen Felix-Hager, Keely Crum, Colleen Washington, Shannon Felix, and Rory Cunningham (for "No New Tricks")	Nominated	
Primetime Creative Arts Emmy Awards	2026	Outstanding Contemporary Hairstyling	Jennifer Bell (for "No New Tricks")	Nominated	
Primetime Creative Arts Emmy Awards	2026	Outstanding Contemporary Makeup (Non-Prosthetic)	Brittany White, Keith Sayer, Erin Blinn, and Veronica Rodarte (for "Hacks")	Nominated	
Primetime Creative Arts Emmy Awards	2026	Outstanding Original Music and Lyrics	"Mis Figuritas" by Carlos Rafael Rivera and David Stal (for "EGOT")	Nominated	
Primetime Creative Arts Emmy Awards	2026	Outstanding Music Supervision	Matt Biffa (for "Hacks")	Nominated	
Primetime Creative Arts Emmy Awards	2026	Outstanding Production Design for a Narrative Program (Half-Hour)	Rob Tokarz, Jeanine A. Ringer, and Jennifer Lukewart (for "Who's Making Dinner?")	Nominated	
Primetime Creative Arts Emmy Awards	2026	Outstanding Single-Camera Picture Editing for a Comedy Series	Peggy Tachdjian (for "The Cube")	Nominated	
Primetime Creative Arts Emmy Awards	2026	Outstanding Single-Camera Picture Editing for a Comedy Series	Jon Philpot (for "Hacks")	Won	
Primetime Creative Arts Emmy Awards	2026	Outstanding Sound Mixing for a Comedy or Drama Series (Half-Hour) and Animation	John W. Cook II, James Parnell, Jim Lakin, Fernanda Domene, David Stal, and Jacob McNaughton (for "The Garden")	Nominated	
Producers Guild of America Awards	2022	Best Episodic Comedy	Jen Statsky, Paul W. Downs, Lucia Aniello, Michael Schur, David Miner, Morgan Sackett, Joanna Calo, Andrew Law, David Hyman, Joe Mande, and Jessica Chaffin	Nominated	
Producers Guild of America Awards	2023	Best Episodic Comedy	Jen Statsky, Paul W. Downs, Lucia Aniello, Michael Schur, David Miner, Morgan Sackett, Joe Mande, Andrew Law, Aisha Muharrar, Ashley Glazier, Samantha Riley, Seth Edelstein, and Jessica Chaffin	Nominated	
Producers Guild of America Awards	2025	Best Episodic Comedy	Jen Statsky, Paul W. Downs, Lucia Aniello, Michael Schur, David Miner, Morgan Sackett, Guy Branum, Andrew Law, Carol Leifer, Joe Mande, Aisha Muharrar, Samantha Riley, Ashley Glazier, and Nate Young	Won	
Producers Guild of America Awards	2025	Outstanding Short-Form Program	Hacks: Bit by Bit	Nominated	
Producers Guild of America Awards	2026	Best Episodic Comedy	Jen Statsky, Paul W. Downs, Lucia Aniello, Michael Schur, David Miner, Morgan Sackett, Joe Mande, Andrew Law, Samantha Riley, Aisha Muharrar, Pat Regan, Ashley Glazier, Jeff Rosenberg, Adam Bricker, and Nate Young	Nominated	
Producers Guild of America Awards	2026	Outstanding Short-Form Program	Hacks: Bit by Bit	Nominated	
Satellite Awards	2022	Best Comedy or Musical Series	Hacks	Nominated	
Satellite Awards	2022	Best Actress in a Comedy or Musical Series	Jean Smart	Won	
Satellite Awards	2023	Best Comedy or Musical Series	Hacks	Nominated	
Satellite Awards	2023	Best Actress in a Comedy or Musical Series	Jean Smart	Nominated	
Satellite Awards	2025	Best Comedy or Musical Series	Hacks	Won	
Satellite Awards	2025	Best Actress in a Comedy or Musical Series	Jean Smart	Nominated	
Satellite Awards	2025	Best Actress in a Supporting Role in a Series, Miniseries or Television Film	Hannah Einbinder	Nominated	
Satellite Awards	2026	Best Comedy or Musical Series	Hacks	Nominated	
Satellite Awards	2026	Best Actress in a Comedy or Musical Series	Jean Smart	Nominated	
Satellite Awards	2026	Best Actress in a Supporting Role in a Series, Miniseries or Television Film	Hannah Einbinder	Nominated	
Set Decorators Society of America Awards	2021	Best Achievement in Decor/Design of a Half-Hour Single-Camera Series	Ellen Reede Dorros and Jonathan Carlos	Won	
Set Decorators Society of America Awards	2022	Best Achievement in Decor/Design of a Half-Hour Single-Camera Series	Jennifer Lukehart and Alec Contestabile	Won	
Set Decorators Society of America Awards	2024	Best Achievement in Decor/Design of a Half-Hour Single-Camera Series	Jennifer Lukehart and Rob Tokarz	Won	
Set Decorators Society of America Awards	2025	Best Achievement in Decor/Design of a Half-Hour Single-Camera Series	Jennifer Lukehart and Rob Tokarz	Nominated	
Set Decorators Society of America Awards	2026	Best Achievement in Decor/Design of a Half-Hour Single-Camera Series	Jennifer Lukehart and Rob Tokarz	Nominated	
Television Critics Association Awards	2021	Program of the Year	Hacks	Nominated	
Television Critics Association Awards	2021	Outstanding Achievement in Comedy	Hacks	Nominated	
Television Critics Association Awards	2021	Outstanding New Program	Hacks	Nominated	
Television Critics Association Awards	2021	Individual Achievement in Comedy	Jean Smart	Won	
Television Critics Association Awards	2022	Program of the Year	Hacks	Nominated	
Television Critics Association Awards	2022	Outstanding Achievement in Comedy	Hacks	Nominated	
Television Critics Association Awards	2022	Individual Achievement in Comedy	Jean Smart	Nominated	
Television Critics Association Awards	2024	Program of the Year	Hacks	Nominated	
Television Critics Association Awards	2024	Outstanding Achievement in Comedy	Hacks	Won	
Television Critics Association Awards	2024	Individual Achievement in Comedy	Jean Smart	Won	
Television Critics Association Awards	2025	Program of the Year	Hacks	Nominated	
Television Critics Association Awards	2025	Outstanding Achievement in Comedy	Hacks	Nominated	
Television Critics Association Awards	2025	Individual Achievement in Comedy	Hannah Einbinder	Nominated	
Television Critics Association Awards	2025	Individual Achievement in Comedy	Jean Smart	Nominated	
Television Critics Association Awards	2026	Program of the Year	Hacks	Nominated	
Television Critics Association Awards	2026	Outstanding Achievement in Comedy	Hacks	Nominated	
Television Critics Association Awards	2026	Individual Achievement in Comedy	Hannah Einbinder	Nominated	
Television Critics Association Awards	2026	Individual Achievement in Comedy	Jean Smart	Nominated	
Writers Guild of America Awards	2022	Comedy Series	Lucia Aniello, Joanna Calo, Jessica Chaffin, Paul W. Downs, Cole Escola, Janis E. Hirsch, Ariel Karlin, Katherine Kearns, Andrew Law, Joe Mande, Pat Regan, Samantha Riley, Michael Schur, and Jen Statsky	Won	
Writers Guild of America Awards	2022	New Series	Lucia Aniello, Joanna Calo, Jessica Chaffin, Paul W. Downs, Cole Escola, Janis E. Hirsch, Ariel Karlin, Katherine Kearns, Andrew Law, Joe Mande, Pat Regan, Samantha Riley, Michael Schur, and Jen Statsky	Won	
Writers Guild of America Awards	2023	Comedy Series	Lucia Aniello, Jessica Chaffin, Paul W. Downs, Ariel Karlin, Andrew Law, Joe Mande, Aisha Muharrar, Pat Regan, Samantha Riley, and Jen Statsky	Nominated	
Writers Guild of America Awards	2023	Episodic Comedy	Lucia Aniello, Paul W. Downs, and Jen Statsky (for "The One, The Only")	Won	
Writers Guild of America Awards	2025	Comedy Series	Genevieve Aniello, Lucia Aniello, Guy Branum, Jessica Chaffin, Paul W. Downs, Jess Dweck, Ariel Karlin, Andrew Law, Carol Leifer, Carolyn Lipka, Joe Mande, Aisha Muharrar, Pat Regan, Samantha Riley, and Jen Statsky	Won	
Writers Guild of America Awards	2025	Episodic Comedy	Lucia Aniello, Paul W. Downs, and Jen Statsky (for "Bulletproof")	Won	
Writers Guild of America Awards	2026	Comedy Series	Genevieve Aniello, Lucia Aniello, Paul W. Downs, Jess Dweck, Ariel Karlin, Andrew Law, Carolyn Lipka, Joe Mande, Aisha Muharrar, Bridget Parker, Pat Regan, Samantha Riley, Jen Statsky	Nominated	

== See also ==
- List of television shows set in Las Vegas
