= André Aciman =

Writer and professor (born 1951)

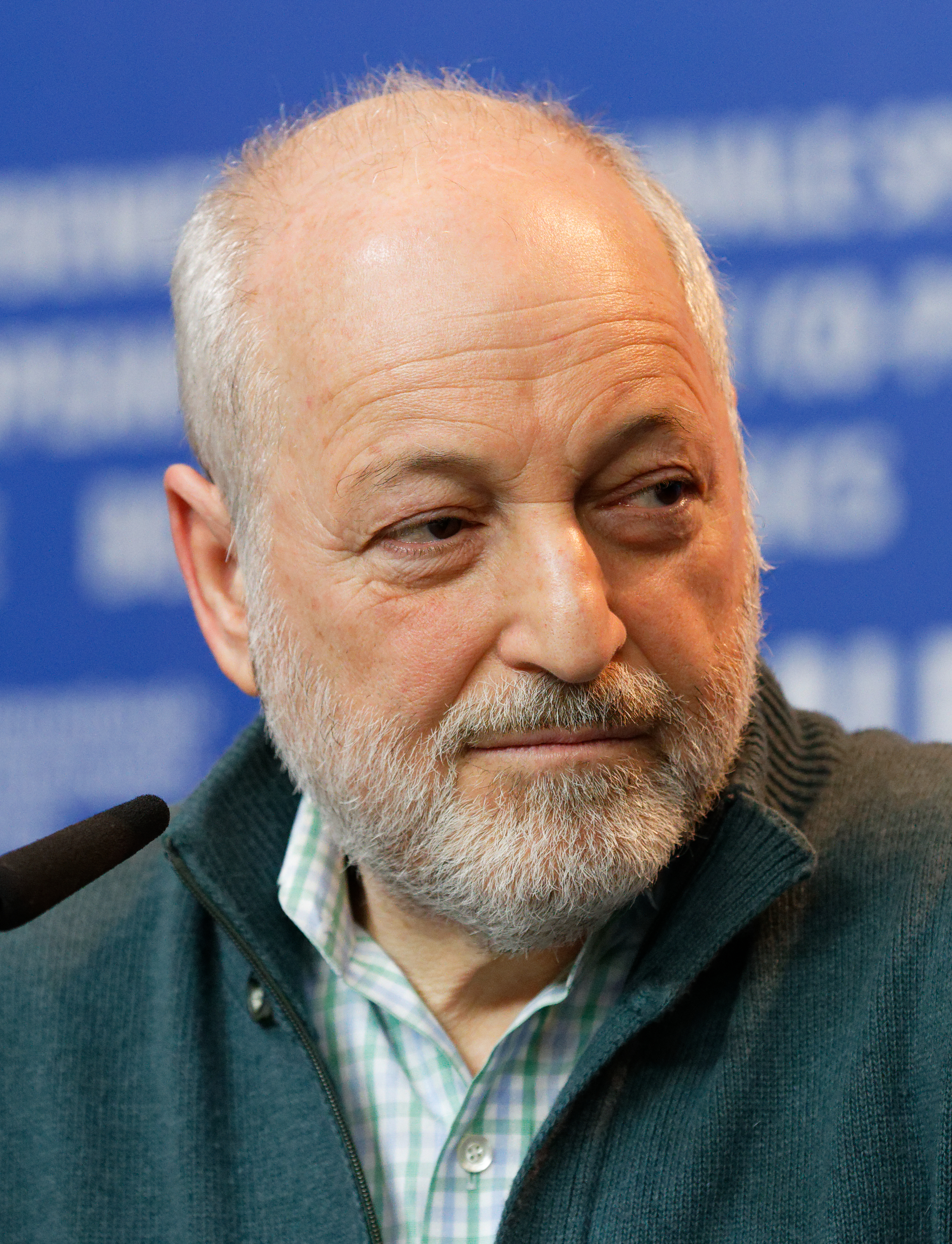
- Aciman in 2017
- Born: 2 January 1951 (age 75); Alexandria, Egypt
- Education: Lehman College (BA); Harvard University (MA, PhD)
- Occupations: Writer; professor
- Spouse: Susan Wiviott
- Children: 3, including Alexander
- Writing career
- Period: 1995–present
- Genres: Short story, novel, essay, romance
- Notable work: Call Me by Your Name (2007)

Signature
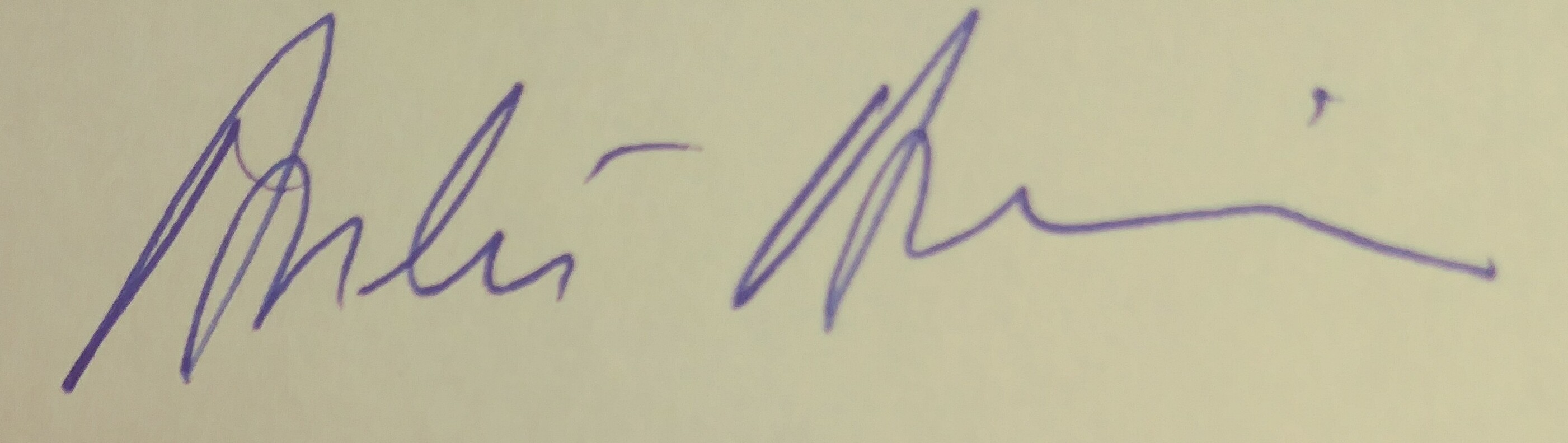

André Aciman (/ˈæsɪmən/; born 2 January 1951) is an Italian-American writer. Born and raised in Alexandria, Egypt, he is currently a distinguished professor at the Graduate Center of the City University of New York, where he teaches the history of literary theory and the works of Marcel Proust. Aciman previously taught creative writing at New York University and French literature at Princeton University and Bard College.

In 2009, he was Visiting Distinguished Writer at Wesleyan University.

He is the author of several novels, including Call Me by Your Name (winner of the 2008 Lambda Literary Award for Gay Fiction), which was made into a film, and the 1995 memoir Out of Egypt, which won a Whiting Award. Though best known for Call Me by Your Name, Aciman said in a 2019 interview that he views the novel Eight White Nights as his best book.

== Early life and education ==
Aciman was born in Alexandria, Egypt, the son of Regine and Henri N. Aciman, who owned a knitting factory. His mother was deaf. Aciman was raised in a largely French-speaking home, where family members also spoke Italian, Greek, Ladino, and Arabic.

His parents were Sephardic Jews of Turkish and Italian origin from families that had settled in Alexandria in 1905 (Turkish surname: Acıman). Considered part of the Mutamassirun ("foreign") community, his family members were unable to become Egyptian citizens. As a child, Aciman mistakenly believed that he was a French citizen. He attended British schools in Egypt. While the family was spared the 1956–57 exodus and expulsions from Egypt, increased tensions with Israel under President Gamal Abdel Nasser put Jews in a precarious position, leading his family to leave Egypt nine years later, in 1965.

After his father purchased Italian citizenship for the family, Aciman moved with his mother and brother as refugees to Rome while his father moved to Paris. They moved to New York City in 1968. He earned a B.A. degree in English and Comparative Literature from Lehman College in 1973, and an M.A. and PhD in Comparative Literature from Harvard University in 1988.

== Out of Egypt ==
Aciman's 1996 memoir Out of Egypt, about Alexandria before the 1956 expulsions from Egypt, was reviewed widely. In The New York Times, Michiko Kakutani described the book as a "remarkable memoir...that leaves the reader with a mesmerizing portrait of a now vanished world." She compared his work with that of Lawrence Durrell and noted, "There are some wonderfully vivid scenes here, as strange and marvelous as something in García Márquez."

== Personal life ==
Aciman is married to Susan Wiviott. They have three sons, Alexander, a writer and journalist, and twins Philip and Michael. His wife, a graduate of the University of Wisconsin–Madison and Harvard Law School, is the CEO of the Bridge, Inc., a New York City-based nonprofit organization that offers rehabilitative services. She is also a board director of Kadmon Holdings, Inc., and formerly worked as Chief Program Officer of Palladia and Deputy Executive Vice President of JBFCS.

== Awards ==
- 1995: Whiting Award
- 2008: Lambda Literary Award for Gay Fiction

== Bibliography ==
=== Novels ===
- Call Me by Your Name (2007)
- Eight White Nights (2010)
- Harvard Square (2013)
- Enigma Variations (2017)
- Find Me (2019)
- The Gentleman from Peru (2024)
- My Roman Year (2024)
- Room on the Sea (2025)
- Stowaways (2026)

=== Short fiction ===
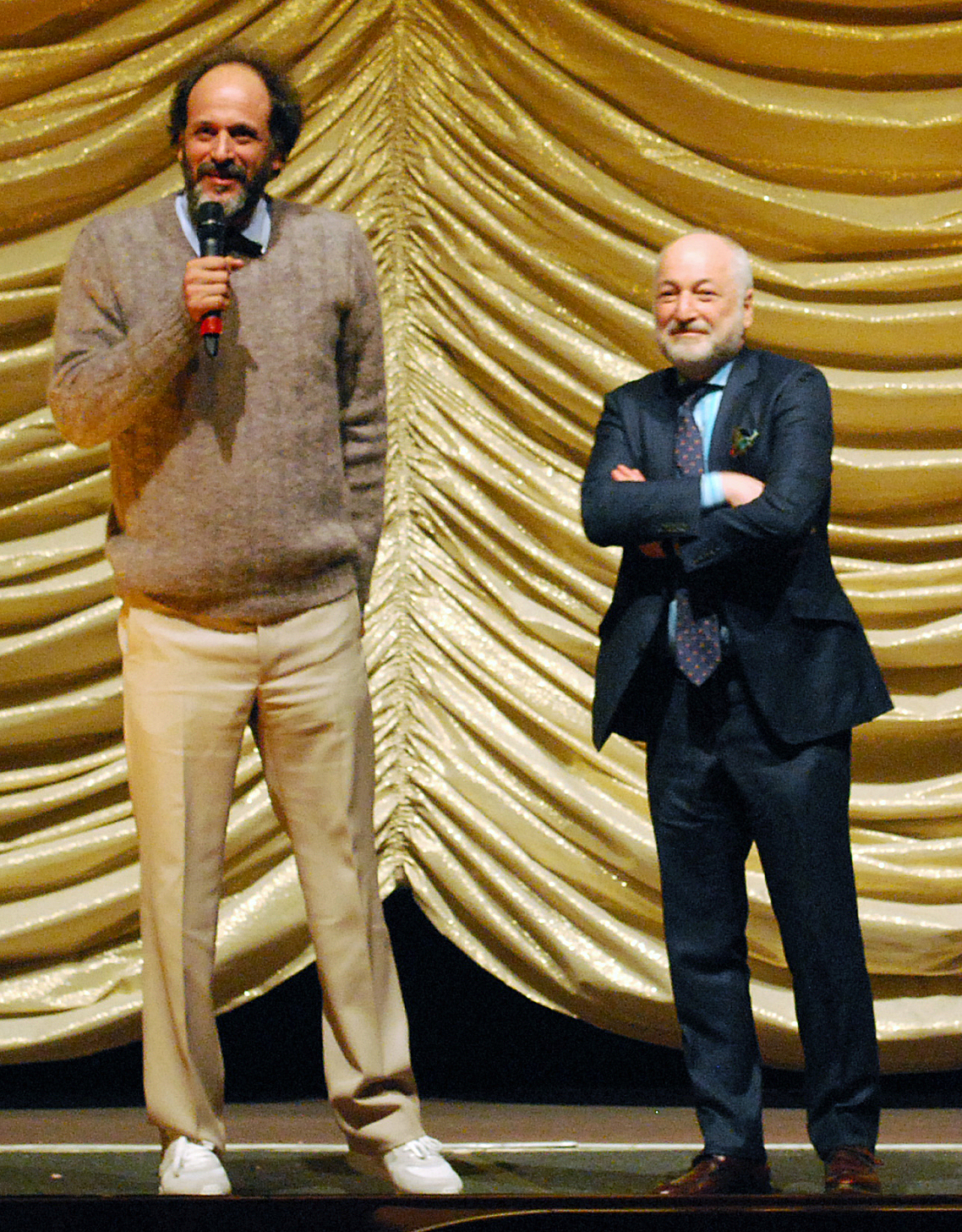
Luca Guadagnino and Aciman at a screening of Call Me by Your Name, at the 2017 Berlin International Film Festival

- "Cat's Cradle". The New Yorker. November 1997.
- "Monsieur Kalashnikov". The Paris Review. 181. Summer 2007.
- "Abingdon Square". Granta. 122 (Betrayal). January 2013.

=== Non-fiction ===
- Out of Egypt (memoir) (1995)
- Letters of Transit: Reflections on Exile, Identity, Language, and Loss (editor/contributor) (1999)
- False Papers: Essays on Exile and Memory (2000)
- Entrez: Signs of France (with Steven Rothfeld) (2001)
- The Proust Project (editor) (2004)
- The Light of New York (with Jean-Michel Berts) (2007)
- Alibis: Essays on Elsewhere (2011)
- Homo Irrealis: Essays (2021)
- Aciman, André (22 October 2024). Roman Year. Farrar, Straus and Giroux. ISBN 978-0-374-61338-9.

=== Selected articles ===
- "Reflections of an Uncertain Jew". The Threepenny Review. 81. Spring 2000.
- "The Exodus Obama Forgot to Mention". Opinion. The New York Times. 8 June 2009.
- "Are You Listening? Conversations with my deaf mother". Personal History. The New Yorker. 17 March 2014.
- "W. G. Sebald and the Emigrants". The New Yorker. 25 August 2016.
- "André Aciman Would Like to Demote Virginia Woolf From the Canon". By the Book. The New York Times. 31 October 2019.
