= Carl Clemons-Hopkins =

American actor

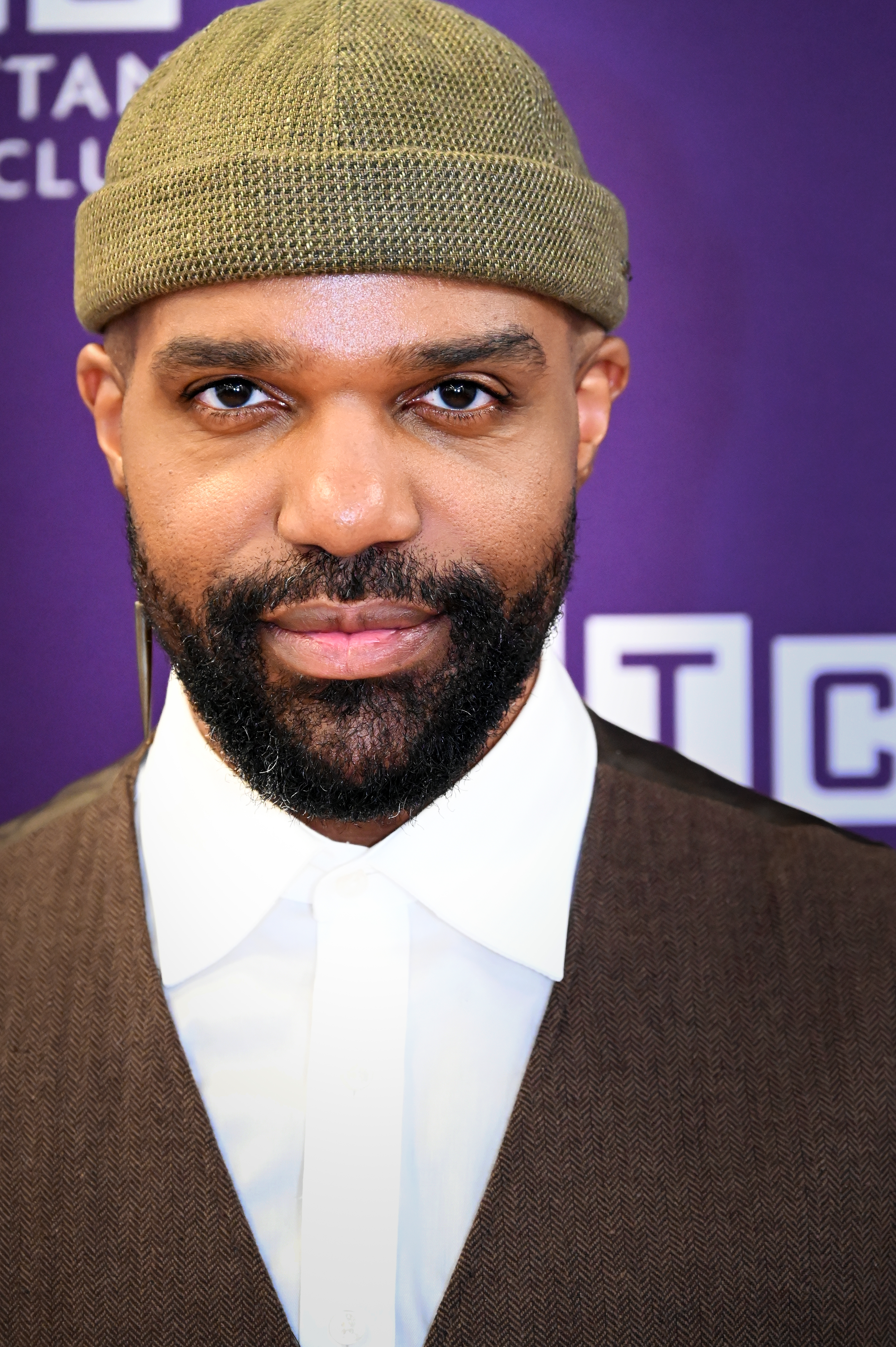
- Clemons-Hopkins in 2026
- Born: Lithonia, Georgia, U.S.
- Education: University of the Arts (BFA)
- Occupation: Actor
- Years active: 2013–present
- Known for: Hacks

Carl Clemons-Hopkins is an American actor, best known for portraying Marcus Vaughan on the Emmy award winning Max comedy-drama series Hacks (2021–2026).

For this role, they were nominated for the 2021 Primetime Emmy Award for Outstanding Supporting Actor in a Comedy Series, and for multiple Actor Awards for Outstanding Performance by an Ensemble in a Comedy Series.

== Early life ==
Clemons-Hopkins was born in Lithonia, Georgia and attended high school in Snellville, Georgia.

== Career ==
Clemons-Hopkins has acted in numerous stage plays. In 2014, they were nominated for a Barrymore Award for Excellence in Theater, which honors Philadelphia-area theater productions, in the category of "Outstanding Supporting Actor in a Musical" for their performance in Little Shop of Horrors. Their performances in 2016 included Time Is On Our Side, in which they were hailed as "immensely likable and sympathetic," and Richard III. In September 2016, they began performing as an original cast member in the Chicago company of Hamilton.

Clemons-Hopkins began pursuing television and film opportunities after watching the 2016 film Moonlight. After seeing the film, they wrote in their journal, "I know there will never be another Moonlight, but if there’s another opportunity like this, I want to be ready."

In 2021, Clemons-Hopkins began starring on the HBO Max comedy-drama series Hacks. For the role, they received a nomination for the Primetime Emmy Award for Outstanding Supporting Actor in a Comedy Series. They starred in the slasher film Candyman, which was released on August 27, 2021. In 2022, they starred as James Baldwin opposite Crystal Dickinson as Nikki Giovanni in Lessons in Survival: 1971 at the Vineyard Theatre. The play follows when Giovanni interviewed Baldwin on the TV show Soul!

Clemons-Hopkins made their Broadway debut, originating the role of Brooks Duncan, in the world premiere of the Tony Award nominated The Balusters in spring of 2026.

Prior to being cast in Hacks, Clemons-Hopkins had contemplated leaving acting to pursue a career in business and was actively preparing to apply for business school.

== Personal life ==
Clemons-Hopkins is queer and non-binary. They use they/them and he/him pronouns.

== Filmography ==
=== Film ===
Year	Title	Role	Notes
2013	La méduse rouge	Window Guard	
2015	Christmas Dreams	Musician 2	
2018	Canal Street	Bobby	
2019	Range Runners	Howard	
2021	Candyman	Jameson	
2023	The Mattachine Family	Ted	
2023	The Beanie Bubble	Jeremy	
2026	Via Negativa	Tim	Premiered at 2026 Tribeca Film Festival

=== Television ===
Year	Title	Role	Notes
2018	Chicago P.D.	DEA Agent Thomas	Episode: "Rabbit Hole"
2018	The Chi	Jean	3 episodes
2020	Chicago Med	Sean Richter	4 episodes
2020	Next	Harrison Cole	Episode: "FILE #7"
2021–2026	Hacks	Marcus Vaughan	Main role, 47 episodes
2023	Star Trek: Lower Decks	Narj (voice)	Episode: "I Have No Bones Yet I Must Flee"
TBA	Enigma Variations	Noah	Pre-Production

== Theater ==
Year	Production	Role	Venue
2014	Little Shop of Horrors	Voice of Audrey II	Bristol Riverside Theatre
2016	Hamilton	Aaron Burr, George Washington	CIBC Theatre
2022	Lessons in Survival: 1971	James Baldwin	Vineyard Theatre
2022	The Most Spectacularly Lamentable Trial of Miz Martha Washington	Davy/Various Roles	Steppenwolf Theatre Company
2026	The Balusters	Brooks Duncan	Samuel J. Friedman Theatre

== Awards and nominations ==
Year	Award	Category	Work	Result	Ref.
2014	Barrymore Awards	Outstanding Supporting Performance (Actor) in a Musical	Little Shop of Horrors (musical)	Nominated	
2021	Primetime Emmy Awards	Outstanding Supporting Actor in a Comedy Series	Hacks	Nominated	
2022	Screen Actors Guild Awards	Outstanding Performance by an Ensemble in a Comedy Series	Hacks	Nominated	
2023	Screen Actors Guild Awards	Outstanding Performance by an Ensemble in a Comedy Series	Hacks	Nominated	
2024	Astra TV Awards (Note: Previously known as Hollywood Critics Association TV Awards.)	Best Supporting Actor in a Streaming Series, Comedy	Hacks	Nominated	
2024	Critics Choice Awards Celebration of LGBTQ+ Cinema and Television	Supporting Performance Award – Series	Hacks	Won	
2025	Screen Actors Guild Awards	Outstanding Performance by an Ensemble in a Comedy Series	Hacks	Nominated	
2025	Astra TV Awards	Best Cast Ensemble in a Streaming Comedy Series	Hacks	Nominated	
2026	Screen Actors Guild Awards	Outstanding Performance by an Ensemble in a Comedy Series	Hacks	Nominated	
2026	Dorian Awards	Outstanding Broadway Ensemble	The Balusters	Nominated	
2026	Astra TV Awards	Streaming Comedy Ensemble	Hacks	Nominated	
