= North and South Brother Islands (New York City) =

Islands in the Bronx, New York

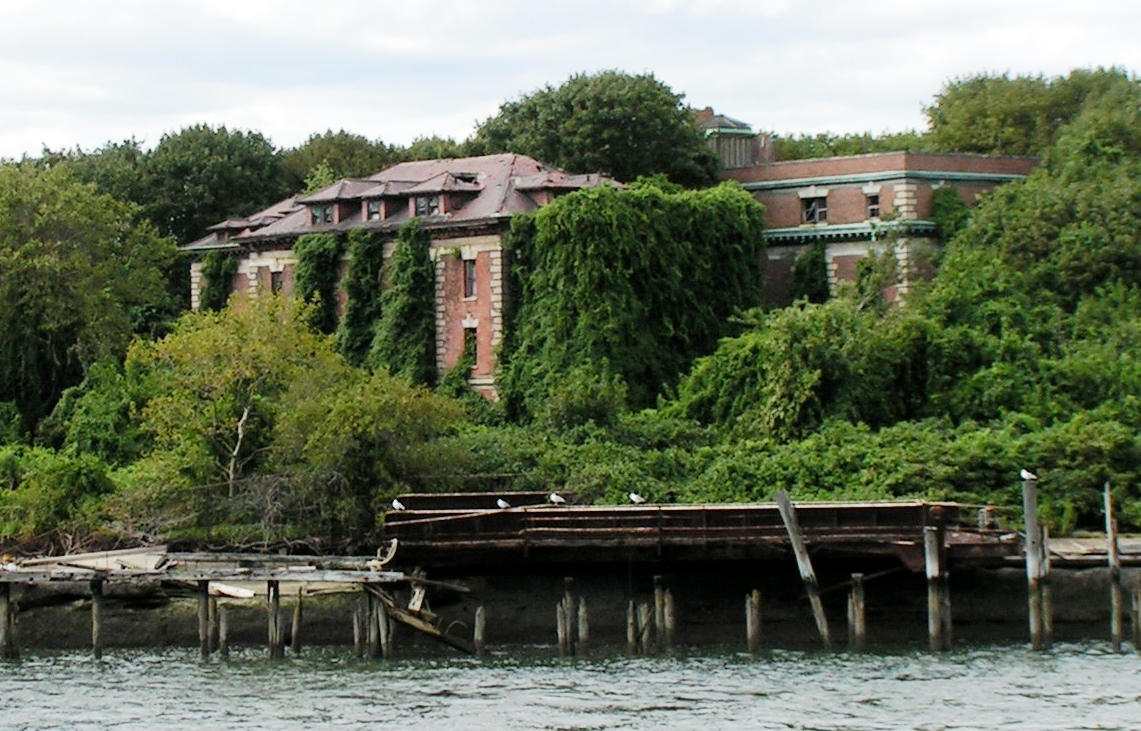
- The remains of Riverside Hospital on North Brother Island, 2006

- Location within New York City Location within New York Location within the United States

Geography
- Location: East River, New York City
- Coordinates: 40°47′54″N 73°53′54″W
- Total islands: 2

Administration
- United States
- State: New York
- City: New York
- Borough: The Bronx

North and South Brother Islands are a pair of small islands located in New York City's East River between the mainland Bronx and Rikers Island. North Brother Island was once the site of the Riverside Hospital for quarantinable diseases but is now uninhabited. The islands had long been privately owned, but were purchased by the federal government in 2007 with some funding from the Trust for Public Land and others; both were given to the city. They were then designated as sanctuaries for water birds.

According to the New York City Parks Department, which oversees the islands, North Brother Island has about 20 acres (8 hectares) of land, and South Brother Island about 6 acres (2.4 ha).

Public access is prohibited but permission is occasionally given to researchers and journalists; a NYC Parks staff member escorts all such visitors.

== History ==
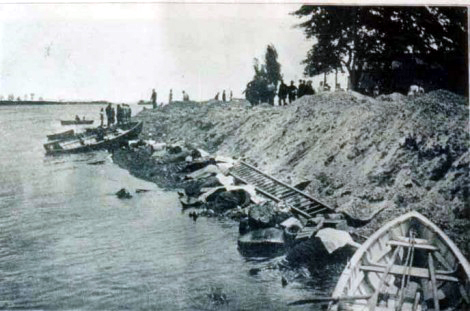
Bodies from the General Slocum wash ashore on North Brother Island, 1904

Both North Brother Island and South Brother Island were claimed by the Dutch West India Company in 1614 and were originally named De Gesellen, translated as "the companions" or "the brethren" in English. One source states that the islands were named by navigator Adriaen Block.

By the late 1600s the islands were owned by the English who occupied the area. In 1695 the government granted both to James Graham who did not develop the islands because the currents in the area were treacherous.

The islands were both originally part of Queens County. On June 8, 1881, North Brother Island was transferred to what was then part of New York County (later to become the Bronx). On April 16, 1964, South Brother Island was also transferred to the Bronx. The islands had been incorporated into Long Island City in 1870, before the consolidation of New York City in 1898.

=== North Brother Island ===
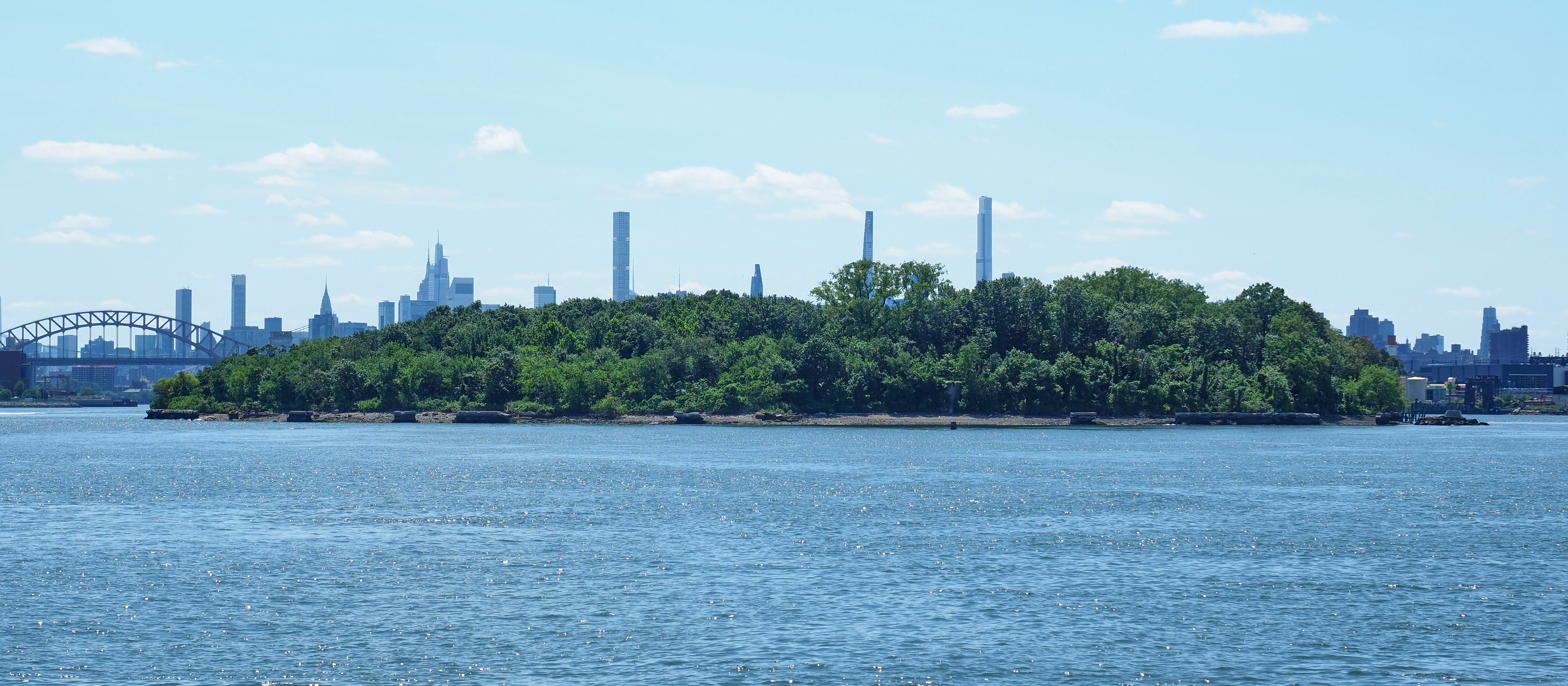
North Brother Island, looking southwest from Barretto Point Park

The northern of the islands was uninhabited until 1885, though a lighthouse was built in 1869. In the mid-1880s the Riverside Hospital moved there from Blackwell's Island (now known as Roosevelt Island). Riverside Hospital had been founded in the 1850s as a smallpox hospital to treat and isolate victims of that disease. Its mission eventually expanded to other quarantinable diseases, initially typhoid and then smallpox and tuberculosis. During the polio epidemic in 1916, Riverside treated numerous patients.

Like the waterfront gantry, the oldest building was erected in 1885 and the last to be established was the Tuberculosis Pavilion, which opened in 1943. It was rendered obsolete within the decade due to the increasing availability, acceptance, and use of the tuberculosis vaccine after 1945.

The island was the site of the wreck of the General Slocum, a steamship that burned on June 15, 1904: 1,021 people died either from the fire on board the ship, or from drowning before the ship beached on the island's shores.

In 1917 it was reported that remains from the closed Kings County Cemetery, a potter's field, were to be reburied on North Brother Island.

According to Joseph Mitchell, a reporter for newspapers and for The New Yorker, the island was the site of many outings of "The Honorable John McSorley Pickle, Beefsteak, Baseball Nine, and Chowder Club" organized by John McSorley of McSorley's Old Ale House; photos of the outings are featured on the walls of the bar.

Mary Mallon, also known as Typhoid Mary, was confined to the island for over two decades until she died there in November 1938. Because of her contagious illness, she had been declared a public menace in 1915; she suffered a stroke in 1932 and was thereafter confined to the hospital. Researchers estimate that Mallon had contaminated "at least one hundred and twenty two people, including five who died".

According to the Smithsonian magazine, the need for a quarantine hospital in a remote location had declined by the 1930s, as "public health advances lessened the need to quarantine large numbers of individuals".

Following World War II, the island housed war veterans who were students at local colleges and their families. After the nationwide housing shortage abated, the island was again abandoned until the 1950s, when a center opened to treat adolescent drug addicts. The facility claimed it was the first to offer treatment, rehabilitation, and education facilities to young drug offenders. Heroin addicts were confined to this facility and locked in a room until they were clean. Many of them believed they were being held against their will. Staff corruption and cost forced the facility to close in 1963. The facility is said to have been the inspiration for the Broadway play Does a Tiger Wear a Necktie?, which helped to launch the career of Al Pacino.

Since the mid-1960s, New York City mayors have considered a variety of uses for the island. John Lindsay, for instance, proposed to sell it, and Ed Koch thought it could be converted into housing for the homeless. The city also considered using it as an extension of the jail at Rikers Island.

Now serving as a sanctuary for herons and other wading shorebirds, the island is presently abandoned and off-limits to the public. Most of the original 25 buildings still stand, "in various states of extreme dilapidation"; hence, permits to visit are issued only for "compelling academic and scientific purposes". Some buildings are in danger of collapse; a dense forest conceals the ruined hospital buildings. In October 2014, New York City Council member Mark Levine, chair of the City Council's Parks Committee, led a delegation to visit the island, and declared his desire afterward to open the island for limited "light-touch, environmentally sensitive" public access. In October 2016, New York magazine reported that the council had commissioned a study from the University of Pennsylvania's School of Design, followed by a public hearing, on how the island could be converted into a park with controlled access by the public.

In 2016, the executive director of the Historic House Trust warned that there were many hazards, due to the deteriorating buildings and open manholes. In addition to resolving those problems, a dock would have been needed. Overall, the cost appeared to be prohibitive and no actual steps were ever taken.

In 2017, reporter Josh Robin of the NY1 channel was allowed to visit the North island and posted a video report that included some of the abandoned buildings. Also in 2017, the Science Channel filmed an episode on North Brother Island for the series What on Earth?. Journalist Dave Mosher accompanied the crew and posted a report and still photographs of the buildings and environment. The report stated that the island is "both eerie and beautiful" but added that most buildings were unsafe, that few buildings still included a "functional roof" and poison ivy was problematic everywhere.

On 8 March 2025 at around 5pm the FDNY received reports of smoke coming from the island. The FDNY dispatched land and marine units to investigate. Units from the land reported what appeared to be a brush fire on the island and directed all land units to respond to "The Rock" FDNY's training center to await transportation to the island. FDNY Marine 6 responded along with the Marine Battalion and confirmed they had smoke from the middle of the island. The Marine Battalion transmitted a 10-75 (10 signal confirming a fire/emergency) for a fire in one of the structures on the island. The marine battalion also stated that the roof had collapsed. Marine 6 transported firefighters from the Rock to North Brother Island to combat the blaze. Marine 1 also responded with their big boat, "343", which is capable of pumping 50,000 gallons per minute and assisted in putting the fire out. Engine 83 and Ladder 29 were first due. It took firefighters 5 hours and 12 minutes to extinguish the blaze. The YouTube Channel "FDNY Response Videos" posted a video showing the firefighting operations.

North Brother Island
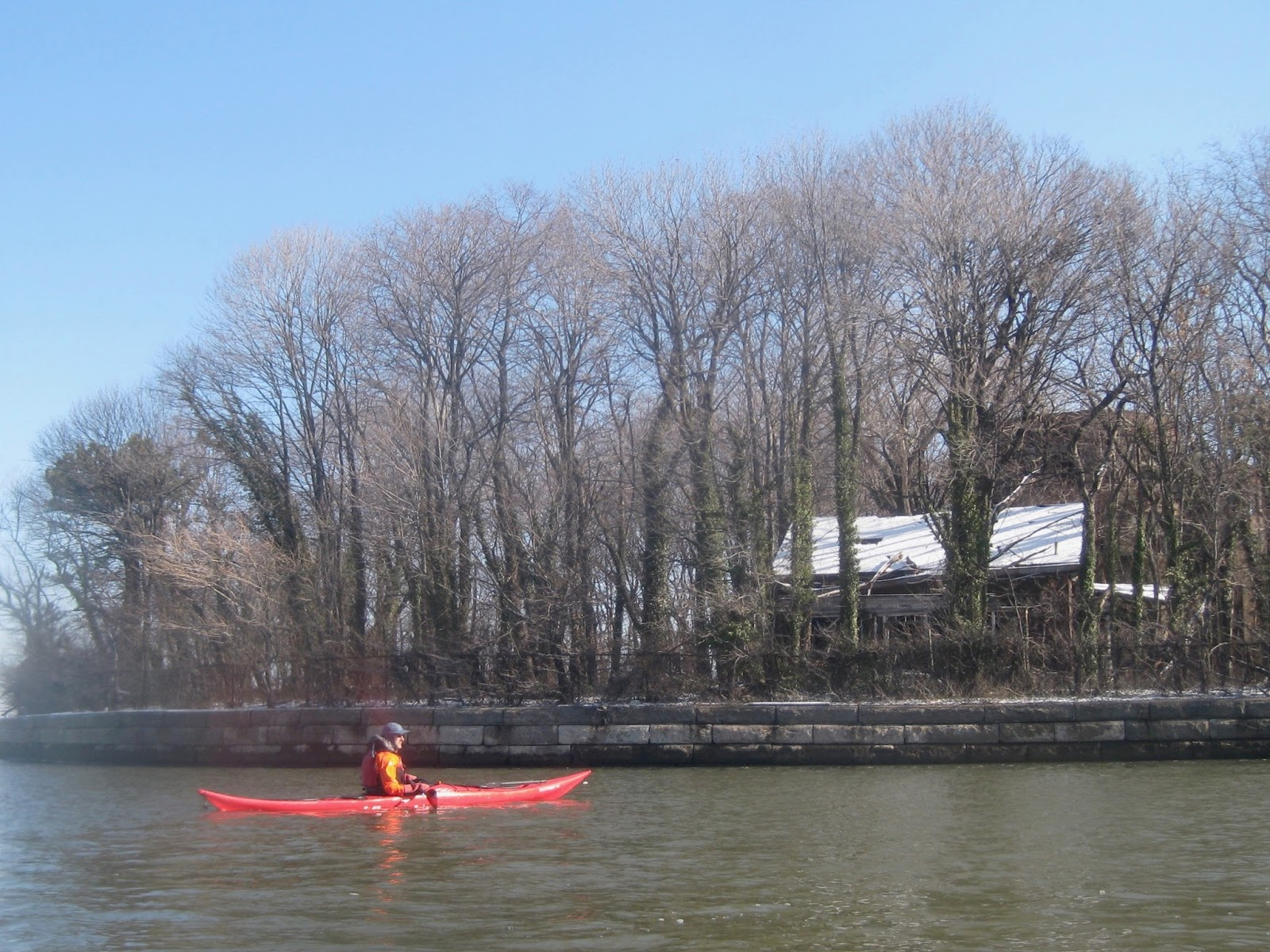
Kayaker at North Brother Island, with the Caretaker's House in disrepair in the background

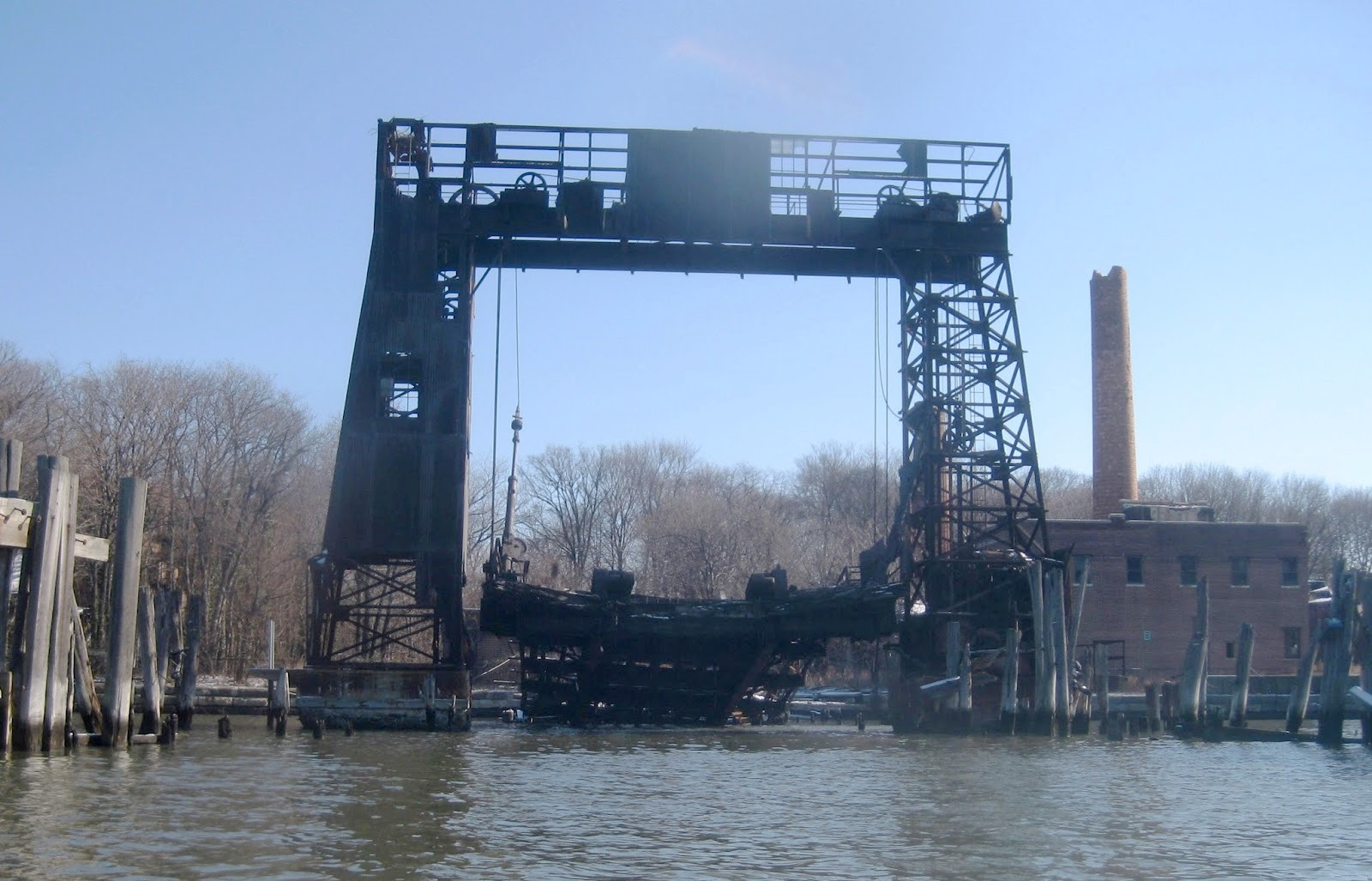
Ruins of the ferry dock at North Brother Island

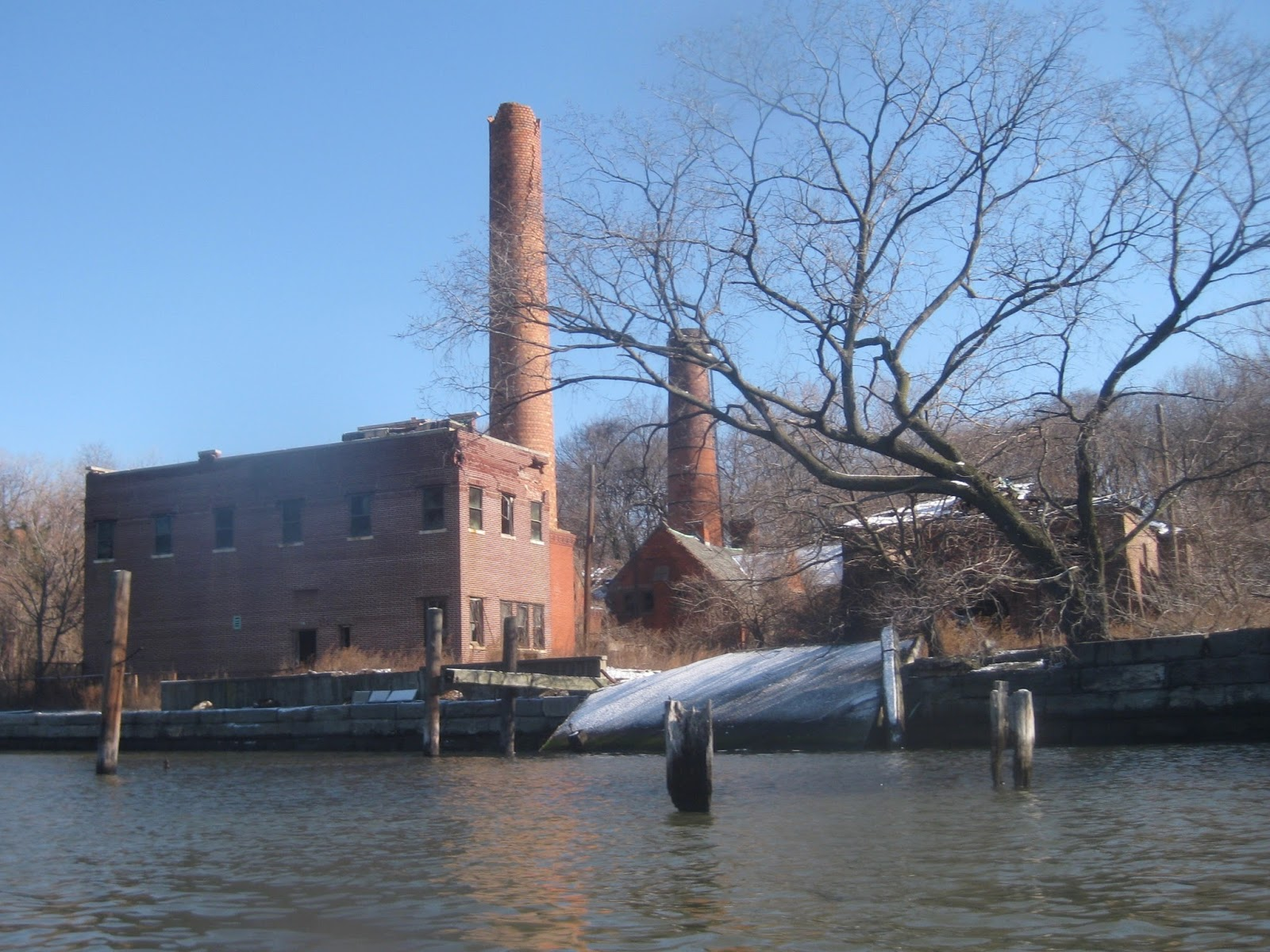
Old Plant at North Brother Island

=== South Brother Island ===
In the mid-19th century, Alfred W. White, who was in charge of public health for the city, used South Brother Island as the city's first dump, where garbage, manure, offal and carcasses were sent to help clean up the city, which consisted at that time of only Manhattan and its islands. However, the island is only about a half-mile from the Bronx and the country estates of the city's rich, such as William Ligett and Jacob Lorillard, both scions of tobacco families. It was also close enough to the shoreline villages of Queens County to be noxious to them as well, and the combination of Queens villages and wealthy Bronxites convinced the Queens County Supreme Court to stop the dumping.

Jacob Ruppert, a brewery magnate and early owner of the New York Yankees, had a summer house on the island that burned down in 1909. No one has lived on the island since then, and there are no structures extant. Ruppert owned the island until the late 1930s, and in 1944 it was purchased by John Gerosa, president of the Metropolitan Roofing Supply Company; he said he planned to construct cottages for employees but they were never built.

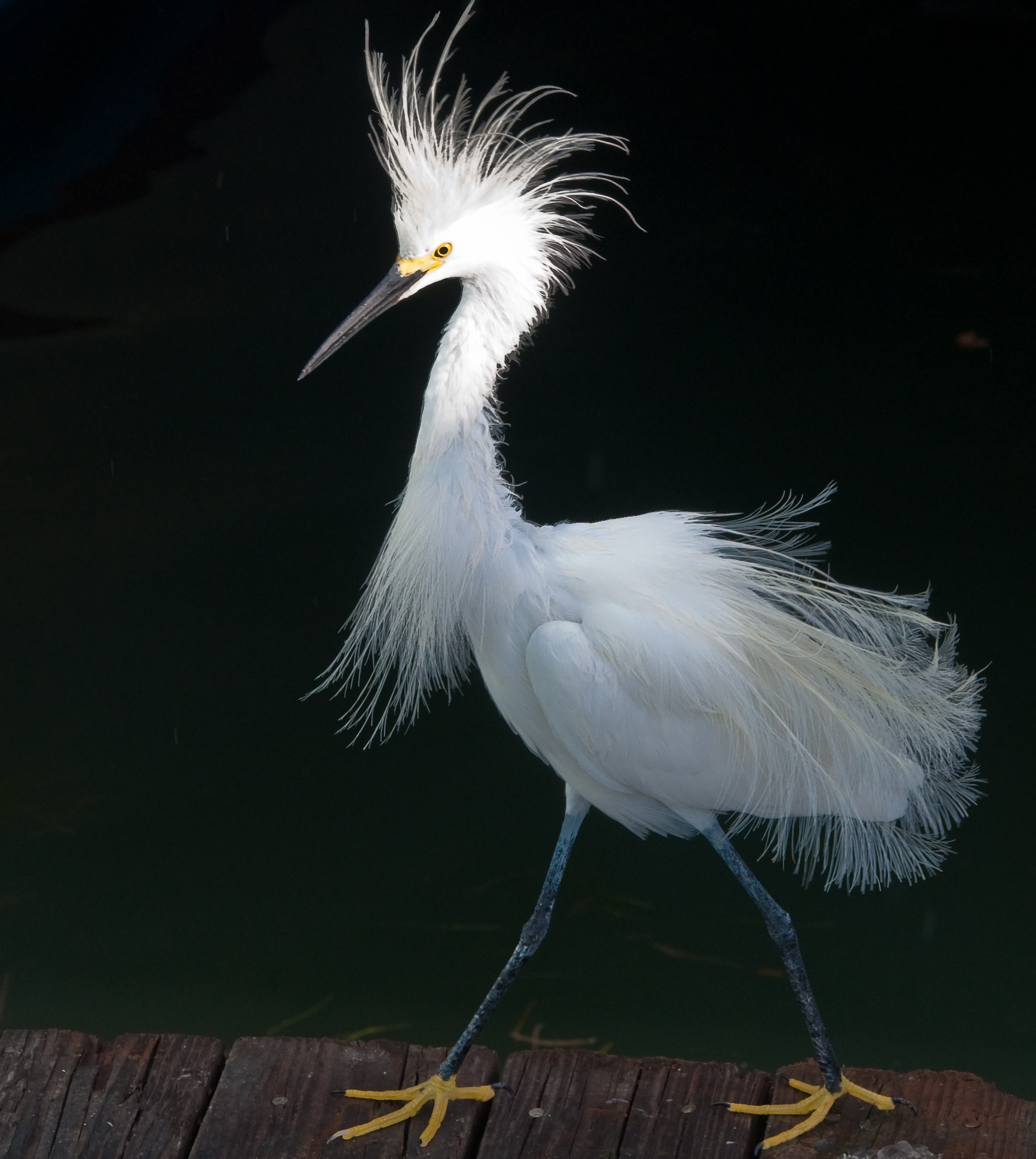
A snowy egret displaying plumage. This type of heron species is one of the inhabitants of South Brother Island.

In 1975, the city sold South Brother Island to Hampton Scows Inc., a Long Island investment company, for $10. Hampton Scows paid property taxes every year but did not develop the island.

In November 2007, the island was purchased in a complicated transaction in which $2 million of federal grant money from the National Oceanic and Atmospheric Administration's Coastal and Estuarine Land Conservation Program was allocated to the Wildlife Conservation Society and the POINT Community Development Corporation. The Trust for Public Land then acquired the island on behalf of those organizations, and then donated it to the city's Parks Department as a wildlife sanctuary. It is managed by the city's Parks Department and the Bronx Zoo. South Brother Island was the 13th island to come under the Parks Department's jurisdiction.

== Wildlife ==
Both islands are part of a designated wildlife sanctuary. From the 1980s through the early 2000s, North Brother Island supported one of the area's largest nesting colonies of black-crowned night heron. However, by 2008 this species had abandoned the island for unknown reasons. Barn swallows use the abandoned structures for nesting, and can be seen flying over the island.

On South Brother Island, dense brush supports nesting colonies of several species of birds, notably black-crowned night heron, great egret, snowy egret, and double-crested cormorant. The New York City Bird Alliance has monitored nesting colonies on the island for over 20 years.

In their May/July 2019 Nesting Survey however, the New York City Bird Alliance was unable to confirm the great blue heron or the green heron as breeding on any of the coastal islands. Some other wading bird species, including black-crowned night-herons, were found to have breeding colonies on South Brother Island; snowy egret and double-crested cormorant were also found nesting there. In fact, "the three largest wader nesting colonies" in the survey included South Brother Island. There was no mention in the report of any significant findings on North Brother Island.

== In popular culture ==
In June 2009, North Brother Island was featured in "Armed and Defenseless", episode 8 of Life After People on the History Channel. It was used as an example of what would happen to structures after 45 years without humans.

It was featured in the Broad City episode "Working Girls" and was mentioned in the episode "Twaining Day".

The island was featured in the Unforgettable episode "The Island".

It is a location inhabited by women and children in Victor LaValle's 2017 novel The Changeling.

North Brother Island is mentioned as the Enclave base in Moon Girl and Devil Dinosaur's season 1 finale "O.M.G. Issue 2".

The opening scene of the 2026 comic book Spider-Man/Hulk: Fire and Brimstone #3 (December 2026) by writer Kevin Smith, takes place at North Brother island.

== See also ==
- North Brother Island Light
