= Broad City season 1 =

Broad City
- Season 1
- Region 1 DVD cover
- No. of episodes: 10

Release
- Original network: Comedy Central
- Original release: January 22 – March 26, 2014

Season chronology
- Next → Season 2

The first season of Broad City, an American television sitcom created by and starring Ilana Glazer and Abbi Jacobson, premiered on Comedy Central on January 22, 2014. The series was adapted from their independently produced web series of the same name which ran from 2009 to 2011. It is produced by Lilly Burns and John Skidmore, with Jacobson and Glazer serving as executive producers, alongside Amy Poehler, Dave Becky, Tony Hernandez, and Samantha Saifer. The season consists of 10 episodes, with concluded on March 26, 2014.

Prior to the creation of the original web series, Glazer had been working on a project with a partner which received negative feedback. In frustration, she enlisted the help of Jacobson, and the two began development of their own web series which became a success, leading to the television series. The series is based on Glazer and Jacobson's real life friendship, and their attempt to "make it" in New York.

Guest appearances include Amy Poehler, Janeane Garofalo, Rachel Dratch, Fred Armisen, Jordan Carlos, Matt Jones, Jason Mantzoukas, Michael J. Burg, Phoebe Robinson, Steven Ogg, Neil Casey, Will Janowitz, Phillip Chorba, Michelle Hurst, Seth Morris, Franchesca Ramsey, Terry Marks, and Amy Sedaris.

== Cast and characters ==
=== Main ===
- Abbi Jacobson as Abbalah "Abbi" Abrams, a twenty-five-year-old woman from the Philadelphia Main Line.
- Ilana Glazer as Ilana Wexler, a twenty-two-year-old woman from Long Island.

=== Recurring ===
- Hannibal Buress as Lincoln Rice
- Arturo Castro as Jamie Castro
- John Gemberling as Matt Bevers
- Paul W. Downs as Trey Pucker
- Chris Gethard as Todd
- Stephen Schneider as Jeremy Santos

== Episodes ==
No. overall	No. in season	Title	Directed by	Written by	Original release date	Prod. code	U.S. viewers (millions)
1	1	"What a Wonderful World"	Lucia Aniello	Abbi Jacobson & Ilana Glazer	January 22, 2014	101	0.914
Abbi is angry with her roommate Melody's lazy boyfriend Bevers for eating Abbi's food and clogging her toilet. Ilana persuades Abbi to lie to her boss, Trey, at Soulstice - the gym where she works as a cleaner - about having an STD test. She lies to get out of work so that the pair can spend the time together getting $200 for tickets to a pop-up Lil Wayne concert. Ilana sells office equipment that she stole from her workplace, Deals Deals Deals. They busk, but do not receive any money. They take up a Craigslist ad for two women to clean the apartment of David (Fred Armisen), a middle-aged man, while they are dressed in their lingerie and he stares at them. He does not pay them - so they take a hat, coat and bottle of alcohol each from his apartment. Guest star: Fred Armisen
2	2	"Pu$$y Weed"	John Lee	Abbi Jacobson & Ilana Glazer	January 29, 2014	105	0.867
Ilana and Abbi resolve to be more responsible adults, so Ilana decides to lodge her tax return. She intends to hire someone to do the paperwork, but decides against it because his fee is too high. She later throws the papers into a trash can. Abbi buys her own marijuana after being disgusted by Ilana's habit of storing their pot in her vagina. They go to a candy store, where Ilana breaks a veneer off a tooth, so she has a new one fitted by her dentist Lincoln (who is also her sex buddy).
3	3	"Working Girls"	Lucia Aniello	Lucia Aniello & Paul W. Downs	February 5, 2014	103	0.897
Abbi's neighbor Jeremy asks her to sign for a package for her, so she calls in sick to work. She misses the delivery because the courier arrives early while she is out and Bevers does not answer the door. She goes to North Brother Island to collect it, but the worker there refuses to give the package to her. She calls Bevers to come there to pretend to be Jeremy, but he gives his real name, so they are unable to collect it. Bevers tells Jeremy that he will stay at Abbi's all day in order to collect the package, and Jeremy takes him to dinner to thank him. Ilana takes a temp job as a receptionist for a temp agency but soon gets distracted by working as a dog walker. One of the dogs chokes on candy at her office, so she takes it to a vet (Janeane Garofalo). Ilana takes the dogs back to the wrong owners. Guest stars: Rachel Dratch, Janeane Garofalo
4	4	"The Lockout"	Lucia Aniello	Abbi Jacobson & Ilana Glazer	February 12, 2014	104	0.793
On the day of her first art gallery show, Abbi bug-bombs her apartment, planning to stay with Ilana. However, Ilana loses her keys, so they are left with nowhere to shower and get ready before the show. They hire a locksmith (Steven Ogg), but find him creepy, so they do not want him to know where they live. They have him get them into their neighbor's apartment, giving him a false name and telling him they live there. The residents come home and mace them, leaving them with red, burnt skin on their faces. Abbi goes to Soulstice, where she tells Trey that the injury was caused by her doing parkour. Ilana finds her keys. Abbi goes to the 'gallery', where she finds out that it is actually a sandwich shop. The shop displays one of Abbi's drawings, which Ilana buys. The locksmith lets himself into the apartment that he thinks is Abbi and Ilana's - and is maced. Guest star: Steven Ogg
5	5	"Fattest Asses"	John Lee	Abbi Jacobson & Ilana Glazer	February 19, 2014	106	0.784
Abbi believes she's too much of a pushover after giving up the opportunity to lead a Soulstice class to a bald woman posing as a cancer patient, so she decides to debut the new, assertive Abbi at a hipster charity party hosted by Ilana's college roommate, where the girls meet two DJs (Jason Mantzoukas, Matt L. Jones). They go back to the DJs' apartment, where the DJs try to maneuver the girls into a foursome. Guest stars: Jason Mantzoukas, Matt Jones.
6	6	"Stolen Phone"	Lucia Aniello	Chris Kelly	February 26, 2014	102	0.924
Abbi and Ilana fail to gain the interest of various men on the Internet, so try their hand at meeting men in person at a bar. After giving her number to a guy, Abbi is distressed to realize she has lost her phone. Using GPS to track it, Abbi and Ilana chase the signal around NYC to find the thief. Ilana is enjoying her new attractive hookup - a muscular bisexual man - but discovers she finds him much less attractive after watching him perform improvisational comedy badly on stage. He walks out after she tells him that his show was not good. Abbi finds her phone, which had been taken by mistake. Abbi meets the man she met at the bar. She finds him very boring, but still has sex with him.
7	7	"Hurricane Wanda"	John Lee	Tami Sagher	March 5, 2014	107	0.857
Abbi invites Ilana, Jaimé, and Lincoln over to her apartment while Bevers invites his sister Marla to wait out the coming storm. While there, the storm cuts off the electricity. The group passes time with games and Abbi is horrified to discover after defecating in the bathroom that the storm has also caused the toilet to stop working. Abbi asks Ilana to get rid of the problem any way she can. Things become more complicated when Jeremy drops in for a visit. A turd is found in Marla's shoe, and she begins to individually accuse the others of putting it there. Abbi says it is hers - and that Ilana put it there. Jeremy leaves. Ilana tells Abbi that she did not put it there. Bevers admits that he defecated in the shoe.
8	8	"Destination: Wedding"	Nicholas Jasenovec	Abbi Jacobson & Ilana Glazer	March 12, 2014	108	0.854
The girls, along with Lincoln and two old catering co-workers, head to a wedding. The trip becomes a comedy of errors: they try to hire a car, but the rental company only have a truck available. When a tire bursts, Lincoln goes to the rental company's office and the rest travel by bicycle and a crowded bus. Ilana is horrified when she finds out that Abbi made out and touched breasts with another girl. When a fish falls on Abbi, they get off the bus. Ilana and Abbi go into a strip club. None of them get to the wedding.
9	9	"Apartment Hunters"	Nicholas Jasenovec	Tami Sagher	March 19, 2014	109	0.875
Abbi is riding high after selling her art for $8,000, but disappointed when she finds out that it is being used by a whites-only dating agency. She comes home to find Bevers masturbating in the living room, so she starts the search for a new apartment. Abbi views a few different apartments, but each has major problems. Ilana is being charged $100 per month for by a cable company, despite having cancelled her subscription. They demand that she return her remote control before they will stop charging her, but she cannot remember where it is. She tries to get it from her creepy former sex buddy Dale, who tries to start a relationship with her. Guest star: Amy Sedaris
10	10	"The Last Supper"	Amy Poehler	Abbi Jacobson & Ilana Glazer	March 26, 2014	110	0.812
Abbi and Ilana go to a fancy restaurant to celebrate Abbi's 26th birthday. A condom falls out of Abbi's vagina while she urinates. Ilana eats a lot of shellfish, despite knowing that she's allergic to it. Her face swells up, so Abbi decides to stab Ilana's arm with Ilana's epi pen. Ilana pulls her arm away, causing Abbi to stab her own thigh. Abbi jumps onto the table and crushes a glass in her hand. Ilana collapses on the floor. The waiter phones for an ambulance. Abbi picks up and carries Ilana towards the restaurant's exit, then the girls are taken to hospital. Guest stars: Amy Poehler, Seth Morris

== Reception ==
=== Critical reception ===
The show has received critical acclaim. Review aggregation website Metacritic gave the first season a score of 75 out of 100, based on reviews from 14 critics. Karen Valby from Entertainment Weekly described the show as a "deeply weird, weirdly sweet, and completely hilarious comedy". The Wall Street Journal referred to the show as "Sneak Attack Feminism". Critic Megan Angelo quotes Abbi Jacobson, main star of Comedy Central's Broad City: "If you watch one of our episodes, there’s not a big message, but if you watch all of them, I think, they’re empowering to women.” The A.V. Club critic Caroline Framke wrote that Broad City was "worth watching" despite its "well-trod premise", and that the series is "remarkably self-possessed, even in its first episode".

Season 1 of the show received a 96% rating from Rotten Tomatoes, based on reviews from 23 critics, with the site's consensus stating, "From its talented producers to its clever writing and superb leads, Broad City boasts an uncommonly fine pedigree." The A.V. Club named Broad City the second best TV show of 2014 for its first season.

=== Accolades ===
- Nominated: Critics' Choice Television Award for Best Comedy Series — Broad City (2014)
- Nominated: Critics' Choice Television Award for Best Actress in a Comedy Series — Ilana Glazer (2014)

== Home media ==
"Broad City: Season 1" was released on DVD via Paramount Home Media Distribution in the United States and Canada (Region 1) on December 2, 2014, and in Australia and New Zealand (Region 4) on November 4, 2015. The 2-disc set contains the original aspect ratio of 1.78:1 (16:9), English Dolby Digital 2.0, and English subtitles for the hard-of-hearing. The special features include outtakes and deleted scenes, video commentary on select episodes, photo gallery, and a map of Broad City drawn by Abbi, is included within the packaging. The season has yet to be released on Blu-ray.

=== Streaming ===
The first season of Broad City is available for streaming in both SD and HD on Amazon Video, Hulu, ITunes, and Google Play. It is not available on Netflix, however, it is provided via Netflix DVD rental.

As of May 2024 (at least), the show is available for streaming on Paramount plus
