= Mike Perry (artist) =

American cartoonist

- Born: 1981 (age 44–45); Kansas City, Missouri
- Education: Minneapolis College of Art and Design
- Notable work: Broad City titles and animation, Wondering Around Wandering: Work-So-Far, Hand Job: A Catalog of Type, Pulled: A Catalog of Screen Printing, Over & Over: A Catalog of Hand-Drawn Patterns
- Awards: Primetime Emmy Award, Outstanding Motion Design, Animation Director, 2018, Broad City, Mushrooms episode
- Website: www.mikeperrystudio.com

Broad City titles

Mike Perry is an American artist, illustrator, animator and curator. He is known for winning a Primetime Emmy Award for animation on Comedy Central's Broad City television show. His pop culture artwork, collaborative projects and communal work are often outside the standard art gallery sensibility. He works in a variety of media including illustration, animation, painting, type, magazines, videos, public art, sculpture, and books.

== Early life ==
Perry grew up outside of Kansas City, Missouri. After getting into trouble as an early teen, he discovered drawing and painting when his grandfather, a painter, gave him a tackle box filled with oil paints.

Perry graduated from the Minneapolis College of Art and Design in 2003 after changing his major from Art to Graphic Design. After he was rejected for an internship at the Walker Art Center, the museum's design director, Andrew Blauvelt, wrote a note suggesting he apply for a job at Urban Outfitters. Perry worked at the company's headquarters on digital media, publications, and catalog design for three years. He moved to Brooklyn in 2004 and in 2006 opened a studio.

== Career ==
Perry's work from 2004 to 2011 was collected in the 2012 monograph for Rizzoli, Wondering Around Wandering. Excited about the publication and wanting to turn it into a bigger, communal and free event, he developed "an unprecedented" and "unlikely" three month long, pop-up community art space in a 7,000-square-foot warehouse in Crown Heights. Perry noted that his inspiration for the project, run by volunteers, came from the fact that "he doesn’t see a lot of support or room for work like his in the galleries and institutions of today’s art world"; Perry "connected that attitude to an absence of more zine, print, and t-shirt shops — alternative spaces, essentially, that function so often as both communal and artistic (and commercial) loci." A Kickstarter campaign for the event raised $32,000 in a month. The community-centered space featured classes, workshops, performances and work by local artists. Seven hundred people came to the opening.

He has taught at Minneapolis College of Art and Design in Minneapolis, Maryland Institute College of Art in Baltimore, the University of the Arts in Philadelphia, Pennsylvania and Parsons School of Design in New York City. A featured speaker at conferences, Perry has been interviewed extensively about the issues of working as a freelance artist. Brand consulting work as creative director and designer includes projects for The New York Times, Dolby, Jameson, the Tonight Show, Facebook, Microsoft, Honda and Insound. His many designs for brands include sneakers for Nike and custom glassware for Duvel.

=== Exhibitions ===
Since 2007, Perry has been in over forty group and solo exhibitions worldwide. Solo shows includeThe Landscape Between Time & Space in London in 2008, and The Patterns Found in Space in New York at Giant Robot in 2009. Lost in the Discovery of What Shapes the Mind, 2010, covering 2,800-square-feet, was the first solo alumnus show at the Minneapolis College of Art and Design. In 2011, We Are the Infinity of Each Other and Color, Shapes, and Infinity were exhibited in Tokyo. A nude series, My Mother Caught Me Doodling, was shown at London's KK Outlet in 2014. His 2016 Intoxicating Pollen Wiggling in a Moist Journey of Constantly Blooming Tides at Garis & Hahn in New York, featuring abstract paintings of nudes and still lifes, led to a show of the same name inaugurating the gallery's Los Angeles location in 2017.

Group shows include The Fine Line in 2010; Walker Art Center's 2011 traveling installation Posterwall for the 21st Century, on the role digital art has played in design; Wondering Around Wandering in 2012; sculpture at the Corning Museum of Glass' Making Ideas: Experiments in Design at Glass Lab in 2013; WOW (Writing on Walls) in Belgium in 2016; and A Fantastic World in 2018.

Perry has created and curated a number of public art installations for arts organizations and companies. In Brooklyn in 2013 he had several projects: street art on a construction site; a playground mural at the school P.S. 705; and his Crown Heights mural, a push back on the gentrification of the neighborhood where Perry's studio is located. In 2014, he created a mural for a Chipotle restaurant in Los Angeles, and a mural in Breda, the Netherlands, featuring a poem by Frank Nicholas, and later in 2015, he made a mural and installation for Facebook in New York. In 2016, Perry made one of New York City's largest rooftop murals in Brooklyn at the workspace a/d/o, and in 2017 he completed a multifloor mural in Cleveland incorporating a Tyehimba Jess poem. His mural Wiggling Waves & Water Wanders went up in 2019 at Pier 17 in New York.

=== Animation ===
Perry became more widely known for animating the titles for all seasons of the Comedy Central show Broad City and for animating the Mushrooms episode animation. He initially turned down the offer to do the titles, his "first real animation project." Show stars and creators Abbi Jacobson and Ilana Glazer described the Mushrooms episode as one of their favorites from the series’ entire run. Jacobson said the titles were “such a big part of the identity of Broad City.” Mushrooms earned Perry and his team an Emmy Award for Outstanding Motion Design.

=== Books and Magazines ===
In collaboration with partner Anna Wolf, Perry started Untitled: (a fashion) Magazine in 2007, and in 2014, Tidal, a biannual print magazine focused on art and culture. His pop culture monographs include Pulled: A Catalog of Screen Printing and the career anthology Wondering Around Wandering: Work-So-Far. The collection My Mother Caught Me Doodling is from the show of the same name. What If My Dog Had Thumbs? is his first solo book for children.

=== Curation ===
Since 2011, Perry and artist Josh Cochran have been organizing a series of nude, two-day drawing marathons, #GetNudeGetDrawn, enlisting volunteers to model nude, initially organized using social media and Craigslist. The drawings are exhibited and sold at a pop-up exhibition immediately afterwards. Other past artist participants include Lisa Hanawalt, Deanne Cheuk, Jon Burgerman, Julia Rothman and Monica Ramos. In 2015, Perry created and curated an 820-foot-long mural with nine other artists, that was completed in one day.

== Awards and recognition ==
Perry was chosen for Step Magazine's 30 under 30 in 2004, and named a groundbreaking illustrator by Computer Arts Projects Magazine in 2007. In 2008, he was selected by the Art Directors Club for Young Guns 6, and received Print Magazine's New Visual Artist award. In 2018, he won the Primetime Emmy Award for Outstanding Motion Design as Animation Director for the Broad City Mushrooms episode for Comedy Central and Jax Media.

== Selected work ==
=== Bibliography ===
- Hand Job: A Catalog of Hand-Drawn Type, Princeton Architectural Press, 2007, ISBN 9781568986265
- Over & Over: A Catalog of Hand-Drawn Patterns, Princeton Architectural Press, 2008, ISBN 9781568987576
- Iron Me On, Chronicle Books, 2009
- Pulled: A Catalog of Screen Printing, Princeton Architectural Press, 2011, ISBN 9781568989433
- I Heart Everything, Chronicle Books, 2011
- Wondering Around Wandering: Work-So-Far, Rizzolli NY, 2012, ISBN 978-0-8478-5803-3
- A Coloring Book by Mike Perry and YOU, Chronicle Books, 2012
- Type: Wall Decals by Mike Perry: 200 Peel-and-Stick Letters, Chronicle Books, 2012
- Unlimited Editions, Chronicle Books, 2012
- My Mother Caught Me Doodling, Mike Perry Studio, 2015
- Curios, Blurb, 2016
- The Broad City Coloring Book, Laurence King Publishing, 2017, ISBN 978-1780679976
- Stoned Marker in Houston W/ Chris, Melville Brand Design, 2018
- Z GOES FIRST: An Alphabet Story Z-to-A, illustrator, Sean Lamb, author, Imprint, 2018 ISBN 978-1250123954
- Astro Baby, illustrator, Michelle Tea, author, Dottir Press, 2019, ISBN 978-1948340076
- What If My Dog Had Thumbs?, Dottir Press, 2019, ISBN 978-1948340090

=== Animation ===
- Behind Broad City - Animating the Mushrooms Episode, Comedy Central
- Ringo Starr, Jimmy Fallon & The Roots Sing Yellow Submarine (Classroom Instruments)

=== Magazines ===
- Tidal Magazine, Design Director

=== Film ===
- Bill Stumpf's Comfort Criteria, Herman Miller]
