= North Brother Island Light =

Lighthouse in the Bronx, New York

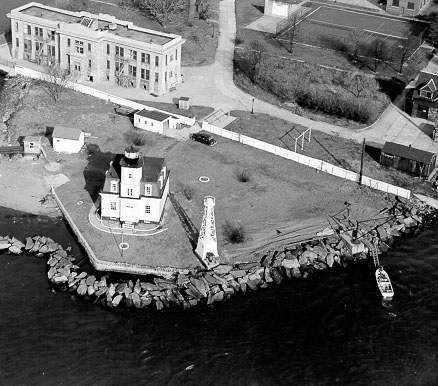
- Location: North Brother Island, East River, New York Harbor
- Coordinates: 40°47′57.3″N 73°53′58.5″W

Tower
- Constructed: 1869
- Construction: Wood tower
- Shape: Octagonal Tower

Light
- Deactivated: 1953

North Brother Island Light was a lighthouse located on North Brother Island in the East River in New York City. The lighthouse was at the southern tip of the island. Before the lighthouse was erected, the island was uninhabited and saw no formal use. The tower utilized an occulting light which lit for five seconds and eclipsed for five seconds. It stood 47 feet above the water.
