= Generator Collective =

American campaign group

Generator Collective is a political activism group based in the United States. It was founded in 2016 by actor, stand-up comedian, and screenwriter Ilana Glazer and former WeWork executive Glennis Meagher, with a goal of "lowering the barrier to entry" to discussing politics.

== Background ==
Glazer and Meagher founded the campaign platform in 2016. The platform promotes female election candidates and general participation in democracy, voting and political discussion.

The group has staged events, sometimes called "Genny Social"s, to discuss politics.
