= Kings County Cemetery (Brooklyn) =

- Interactive map of Kings County Cemetery

Details
- Location: Clarkson Avenue, East Flatbush, Brooklyn, New York City
- Country: United States
- Coordinates: 40.65720°N 73.93342°W
- Find a Grave: Kings County Cemetery

Kings County Cemetery, also known as Kings County Farm Cemetery or County Farm Cemetery, was a cemetery located on Clarkson Avenue, East Flatbush, Brooklyn, New York City. The cemetery was also called Potter's Field (name for paupers' grave), not to be confused with the Potter's Field at Hart Island, the Bronx. The cemetery was disestablished and newspaper reports in 1917 indicated the remains were to be moved to North Brother Island.

Many unclaimed dead were buried at Potter's Field. At one time, mass graves were used at Potter's Field with large pits containing 100 burials.

== Potter's Field on Livingston Street ==
There was also a Potter's Field, considered a public burying ground, on the northwest corner of Livingston Street and Boerum Street in present day Downtown Brooklyn.
