= List of Broad City episodes =

Broad City is an American television sitcom that premiered on January 22, 2014, on Comedy Central. The series was created by and stars Ilana Glazer and Abbi Jacobson as two best friends who navigate everyday life in New York City.

The series ended on March 28, 2019, after five seasons and 50 episodes.

== Series overview ==
Season	Episodes	Originally released	
Season	Episodes	First released	Last released
1	10	January 22, 2014	March 26, 2014
2	10	January 14, 2015	March 18, 2015
3	10	February 17, 2016	April 20, 2016
4	10	September 13, 2017	December 6, 2017
5	10	January 24, 2019	March 28, 2019

== Episodes ==
=== Season 1 (2014) ===
No. overall	No. in season	Title	Directed by	Written by	Original release date	Prod. code	U.S. viewers (millions)
1	1	"What a Wonderful World"	Lucia Aniello	Abbi Jacobson & Ilana Glazer	January 22, 2014	101	0.914
2	2	"Pu$$y Weed"	John Lee	Abbi Jacobson & Ilana Glazer	January 29, 2014	105	0.867
3	3	"Working Girls"	Lucia Aniello	Lucia Aniello & Paul W. Downs	February 5, 2014	103	0.897
4	4	"The Lockout"	Lucia Aniello	Abbi Jacobson & Ilana Glazer	February 12, 2014	104	0.793
5	5	"Fattest Asses"	John Lee	Abbi Jacobson & Ilana Glazer	February 19, 2014	106	0.784
6	6	"Stolen Phone"	Lucia Aniello	Chris Kelly	February 26, 2014	102	0.924
7	7	"Hurricane Wanda"	John Lee	Tami Sagher	March 5, 2014	107	0.857
8	8	"Destination: Wedding"	Nicholas Jasenovec	Abbi Jacobson & Ilana Glazer	March 12, 2014	108	0.854
9	9	"Apartment Hunters"	Nicholas Jasenovec	Tami Sagher	March 19, 2014	109	0.875
10	10	"The Last Supper"	Amy Poehler	Abbi Jacobson & Ilana Glazer	March 26, 2014	110	0.812

=== Season 2 (2015) ===
No. overall	No. in season	Title	Directed by	Written by	Original release date	Prod. code	U.S. viewers (millions)
11	1	"In Heat"	Lucia Aniello	Abbi Jacobson & Ilana Glazer	January 14, 2015	201	0.863
On a hot sunny day, Ilana hunts for a good last-minute gift for her sex buddy Lincoln, having only found out his birthday on the day itself. Male Stacy (Seth Rogen) falls asleep during woman on top sex with Abbi. The girls look for an air conditioner for Abbi's bedroom – and steal one from a dormitory at their old university, NYU. Abbi's roommate Melody's boyfriend Bevers brings a box of kittens to Abbi's apartment. One of them escapes and startles Stacy while he is kissing Abbi in her bedroom – causing Stacy to accidentally push the air conditioning unit out of the window. Guest stars: Seth Rogen, Kumail Nanjiani, Raviv Ullman
12	2	"Mochalatta Chills"	Michael Blieden	Jen Statsky	January 21, 2015	202	0.845
Abbi is horrified that Bevers has spent so long on her and Melody's couch that he has a large bedsore on his lower back; Melody is in Port-au-Prince. Abbi is finally able to help her boss Trey to train someone at Soulstice, the gym that Abbi cleans at. Unfortunately, the new client is obese Bevers – who has decided to get into shape. The training goes wrong when Bevers is injured while falling off a treadmill and decides not to return. Ilana enjoys being a corporate overlord when she hires several unpaid interns at her workplace, Deals Deals Deals, without permission. When she realises that she is treating them as slaves, she fires them.
13	3	"Wisdom Teeth"	John Lee	Abbi Jacobson & Ilana Glazer	January 28, 2015	203	0.659
Ilana becomes a life model at Abbi's art class. Abbi finds it distracting to see her nude. Abbi encounters Jeremy in the hall, telling him that she is having her wisdom teeth extracted. Lincoln performs the surgery and Ilana takes care of her friend while she recovers, sending Ilana's Guatemalan roommate Jaimé to buy ice cream for Abbi. Abbi phones Jeremy, leaving a long message on his voicemail during which she asks him out. After drinking a cocktail that contains marijuana which was made by Ilana, Abbi leaves the apartment with her stuffed toy Bingo Bronson, which she hallucinates is much bigger than her and is talking to her. Abbi walks to Whole Foods Market in Brooklyn, believing that Bingo Bronson is walking with her. She spends nearly $1,500 there using her credit card. Ilana finds out from an automated call on Abbi's cellphone that she is at Whole Foods. Jaimé is still at the ice cream parlor when it closes, having been unable to choose which flavor to buy. Abbi encounters Jeremy again in the hall; he tells her that he will go on a date with her.
14	4	"Knockoffs"	Lucia Aniello	Lucia Aniello & Paul W. Downs	February 4, 2015	204	0.771
Abbi, Ilana and Ilana's mother Bobbi (Susie Essman) have their nails done. Abbi goes to Jeremy's apartment for a casual date. During missionary sex, Abbi suggests that they switch. She meant to change position, and is surprised when Jeremy expects her to peg him using his strap-on dildo. Abbi phones Ilana for advice while Ilana and Bobbi are buying counterfeit designer handbags from a Chinese woman. Ilana is delighted that Abbi has the opportunity to peg and encourages her to do it, which she does. Ilana and Bobbi go to Bobbi's mother Esther's shiva, where Ilana's father Arthur (Bob Balaban) and her brother Eliot are already attending. Abbi arrives at the shiva, where she talks to Ilana and her family about pegging. After Ilana and Bobbi leave, they are arrested by the police, who seize their bags before releasing Ilana and Bobbi. Abbi washes the dildo in Jeremy's dishwasher, which melts it badly out of shape. Abbi buys a new dildo of similar appearance from a sex shop. Jeremy rejects the replacement, due to it being a knockoff. They argue – she tells him that he is too particular and he says that she is judgemental and has bad taste – then Abbi leaves. In Abbi's apartment, her dildo is fixed to the wall and she is using it to hang her necklaces on. She has decided to master regular sex and rejects Ilana's suggestion to peg her. At Ilana's parents' house, Bobbi convinces Arthur to buy a dildo so that she can peg him. Guest stars: Susie Essman, Bob Balaban
15	5	"Hashtag FOMO (#FOMO)"	Jeff Tomsic	Chris Kelly	February 11, 2015	205	0.760
Abbi has her nose pierced. Ilana feels that she is missing out on a lot of fun. She goes into work to tell them that she is leaving straight away because she is going to a party. Abbi and Ilana go to a party at Trey's apartment, but Ilana finds it boring, so they leave – Abbi falsely claims to Trey that she has to leave because she has a tapeworm in her butt. They attend two more parties which they also leave because Ilana thinks they are boring. The next party is much more lively, but the police stop the party, so they leave. They go to a jazz nightclub, where Ilana discovers Abbi's drunken alter-ego, jazz singer Val. They leave at 6.45am. Abbi is shocked when she sees that the cleaner who joined Soulstice yesterday has become a trainer.
16	6	"The Matrix"	John Lee	Abbi Jacobson & Ilana Glazer	February 18, 2015	206	0.744
Abbi, Ilana and Lincoln are invited to the wedding of Eliot's dog to his partner's dog in Central Park later in the day. Feeling sucked into a never-ending web of technology, Abbi and Ilana unplug to go rollerblading in Central Park without their cellphones. While there, Abbi falls into a hole, is injured and is unable to climb out. Ilana searches for help for her, as well as to find out exactly where the dog wedding is taking place. Ilana arrives at the dog wedding as it is taking place. The attendees halt the proceedings to get medical help for Abbi. The group, including Abbi on a stretcher, go back to finish the wedding – before she is taken away by the paramedics. Guest star: Janeane Garofalo
17	7	"Citizen Ship"	Michael Blieden	Anthony King	February 25, 2015	207	0.661
Abbi, Ilana and Lincoln go on a local cruise with Jaimé to celebrate him becoming a U.S. citizen. Abbi is the only one of the four who is on the guest list – having been invited by Melody. The ship is full of lawyers who are Melody's coworkers. Abbi and Ilana make a scene and the group is allowed to board. They meet Bevers, and he tells them that Melody is also on board. Ilana, Abbi and Bevers go into a store room to find drink and are accidentally locked in there. Lincoln and Jaimé feel out of place. Bevers intends to propose to Melody. Abbi encourages him, because she is pleased at the prospect of Bevers marrying Melody and the couple moving out of the apartment, because Abbi would much rather not have him in her life. Ilana speaks about her opposition to marriage and her pride in being single. She is horrified that she and Lincoln may have become a couple, because she wants them to remain sex friends. They are released from the room. Bevers decides against proposing, and when he is handed the microphone to do so, he instead falsely declares that Abbi is transgender into becoming a man. Ilana and Lincoln eventually find somewhere to have sex. Melody is initially disappointed at Bevers' not proposing, but they make up and she and Bevers have sex in a lifeboat. The following day, Abbi, Ilana and Lincoln attend the ceremony at which Jaimé becomes a citizen.
18	8	"Kirk Steele"	Lucia Aniello	Abbi Jacobson & Ilana Glazer	March 4, 2015	208	0.684
While masturbating and watching porn on her laptop, Ilana discovers that Abbi's boss Trey used to be a solo porn performer named Kirk Steele. Abbi applies for a menial job in a bar, and is quickly rejected. Ilana babysits a little boy, Oliver, for his rich Manhattan mother. Ilana brings Oliver to a café, where she meets Abbi and shows her the porn. Abbi uses this information – with Ilana's encouragement – to blackmail Trey into letting her teach the kettlebell class that day. At the beginning of the class, Abbi accidentally throws a kettlebell at a large $1400 mirror, severely damaging it. This means that Trey and Abbi have to come up with $700 each to buy a replacement mirror so that they can pretend that the breakage did not happen and avoid being fired. Oliver suggests to his mother that Ilana take the designer clothes to a homeless shelter that his mother was going to give to horses. Oliver then tells Ilana that the real plan is to take them to a clothes shop to sell them. Ilana and Abbi sell the clothes for $903. Trey and Abbi replace the mirror that night. He lets Abbi teach another class (which does not involve weights) in the morning, because the instructor is missing. Guest stars: Amy Ryan, Kimiko Glenn
19	9	"Coat Check"	Jeff Tomsic	Lucia Aniello & Paul W. Downs	March 11, 2015	209	0.763
Abbi and Ilana are working coat check at a party. Ilana sees her doppelgänger Adele (Alia Shawkat), and is immediately strongly attracted to her, without noticing their physical similarity. Ilana leaves Abbi alone in the cloakroom. Abbi accidentally gives Kelly Ripa's coat to someone else. Abbi hopes that bringing Kelly her coat will lead to her forming a friendship with her. Abbi goes to the address that is on a card in the pocket of the only remaining coat in the cloakroom. At that apartment, the resident is holding an orgy and tells her that it belongs to her ex (David Wain). The resident hands Abbi some of her ex's belongings to take to him. Abbi goes to the man's apartment and gives him his coat and the things that his ex handed her. Abbi's plan is successful, and she goes to Kelly's apartment. Abbi is disappointed to learn that Kelly is not as glamorous as she seems to be on television. Abbi leaves after two male escorts arrive. Ilana is enjoying her fling, until she is surprised when Abbi points out to her that Adele looks exactly like her. Knowing of the strong physical similarity makes Ilana feel uncomfortable. Ilana makes Adele leave her apartment and decides to not see her again when she finds out that she does not smoke marijuana. Guest stars: Alia Shawkat, Kelly Ripa, David Wain
20	10	"St. Mark's"	Nicholas Jasenovec	Abbi Jacobson & Ilana Glazer	March 18, 2015	210	0.672
The girls celebrate Ilana's 23rd birthday by going to a restaurant on St. Mark's, Manhattan. On the way, they see a man who is walking on stilts and dressed as a tree. They encounter two loud acquaintances whom they dislike, and who push their table next to Abbi and Ilana's. Because of that, Abbi and Ilana leave after drinking wine, without ordering any food. The girls go to a stall where Ilana buys a wig and they buy a T-shirt each, which they wear. Abbi's shirt has a picture of a challah and says Challah Back on it; Ilana's says Female Body Inspector. A mugger snatches a bag out of Abbi's hand. The girls chase him on foot, Ilana's wig dropping to the ground. They see him go into his upmarket house, where his mother is hosting a dinner party. She calls upstairs to her 34-year-old son Timothy, who argues with her and throws Abbi's bag downstairs. After leaving the house, 'tree man' gives Ilana her wig. The girls sit on the steps outside a restaurant and eat pizza. They talk to each other about their accomplishments during the past 12 months and their plans for the next 12. Guest stars: Aidy Bryant, Conner O'Malley, Patricia Clarkson, Leo Fitzpatrick, Bianca Castro (aka Jiggly Caliente from RuPaul's Drag Race)

=== Season 3 (2016) ===
No. overall	No. in season	Title	Directed by	Written by	Original release date	Prod. code	U.S. viewers (millions)
21	1	"Two Chainz"	Lucia Aniello	Paul W. Downs & Lucia Aniello	February 17, 2016	301	0.772
When Ilana arrives for brunch with Abbi, she accidentally drops the key to her bicycle lock down a storm drain while the lock and chain is around Ilana's waist. While attempting to reach the key, Abbi stains her top, so Abbi and Ilana go to a hostile pop-up shop before they go to Abbi's college roommate Max's art gallery opening. While trying on a new top, Abbi's old top is stolen, forcing her to buy the new top. After they leave, Abbi realizes the security tag is still attached to the top. They return to have it removed, but find that the store is no longer there. Abbi uses a portable toilet on a construction site; it is transported onto a truck while she is in it. She gets out of it before the truck drives away. Ilana gets stuck onto the back of another truck when she sits on it and her chain gets caught on a hook. Abbi attracts the attention of the driver, who stops, so that Abbi can free Ilana from the hook. The girls go to the gallery, where they meet Max. Ilana attempts to remove the security tag with her teeth causing ink to shoot out of it onto Max's painting. Abbi and Ilana are ejected by Max. At Ilana's apartment, Abbi eventually manages to pull the chain off Ilana using cream as lubricant. Guest stars: Emily Meade, Har Mar Superstar
22	2	"Co-Op"	Ryan McFaul	Paul W. Downs & Lucia Aniello	February 24, 2016	302	0.633
The girls play basketball against a group of little boys. Ilana buys groceries from the food cooperative that she is a member of. She is told by the staff that today is the last day on which she can work her shift in order to maintain her membership. Ilana cannot do the shift because she has an appointment, so she asks Abbi to pose as her while working the necessary hours. Abbi does so, while wearing Ilana's clothes as well as talking and acting like her. During the shift, Abbi is attracted to Craig and reveals her identity to him. He is angry with her and informs the branch manager, who bans both girls for life. Lincoln drives Ilana to her HPV vaccines appointment. During the journey back, Lincoln tells Ilana that he had sex with another woman, which she is both angry and delighted about. Guest star: Melissa Leo
23	3	"Game Over"	Lucia Aniello	Abbi Jacobson & Ilana Glazer	March 2, 2016	303	0.599
Abbi leads an exercise class of elderly people in Soulstice's swimming pool. An elderly man pretends to have lost consciousness in the pool in order to receive mouth-to-mouth resuscitation from her. Abbi prepares for her first "Soulstice Games" in Central Park since being promoted from cleaner to trainer. Ilana leaves work to try to discourage Abbi from competing, but Abbi knocks fellow trainer Gemma to the ground with a pugil stick then pummels her face with it. Trey assumes that she started steroids after being promoted, saying that every new trainer does. Ilana's boss Todd is annoyed with her for coming to work when he had told her not to that day, as well as for wearing a dog hoodie. Visiting investor Elizabeth (Vanessa Williams) tells Ilana to run the company's social media accounts. Todd fires Ilana from Deals Deals Deals for tweeting a video of a horse anally penetrating a man from the company's account. Guest stars: Vanessa Williams, Whoopi Goldberg
24	4	"Rat Pack"	Ryan McFaul	Jen Statsky	March 9, 2016	304	0.574
Ilana and Jaimé spend all their rent money ($400) on an exterminator to kill a rat that is in their apartment. They decide to throw a party and charge an entry fee of $10 in order to make back their money. A basket of food and drink arrives on their doorstep, which Jaimé assumes is a gift from his parents. Abbi joins Tinder after Trey drunkenly kisses her at the Summer Solstice Soulstice Party. Ilana and Jaimé's party becomes more successful when Jaimé convinces Abbi to invite her matches from Tinder. Ilana tries to track down a rat in her apartment that the exterminator failed to kill – while trying to prevent the guests discovering it. Several men show up to the party because Abbi did not realize she had the option to "swipe left" and reject guys. Trey flirts with Abbi through texting and she hides it from Ilana. Ilana takes the cat from the bodega to hunt down the rat. A courier calls at the apartment to say that he needs the basket, as he accidentally delivered it to the wrong address. Abbi makes out with him while Ilana and Lincoln put things in the basket to make it look like it was when it was delivered to them. Ilana finds the rat and its young in the basket – which delights her and disgusts the guests. Abbi tells the courier to report that the basket was stolen, then she pushes him out of the door. Two more rats walk across the floor. Jaimé reluctantly attends to Ilana's bacne, while criticizing her for putting her clothes in the oven, wearing earrings which say Latina and having a Grindr profile. Guest star: Eugene Mirman
25	5	"2016"	Todd Biermann	Chris Kelly	March 16, 2016	305	0.640
Abbi and Ilana sit on a bench in a park and talk about their ideas for inventions. Behind them, two people fall down steps and one is taken away on a gurney. Abbi's neck is injured by her hairdresser, after which she attempts to have her driver's license photo retaken at the DMV; the photo is done badly because of the pain she is in. Ilana goes to a temp agency, where she is given a job as a bike messenger. Ilana carries Abbi on her bicycle to her chiropractor (Alan Alda). Ilana goes back to the DMV and has her photo retaken. Ilana delivers a package to the headquarters for Hillary Clinton's presidential campaign, where she signs up, wrongly assuming it to be a paid job. When she learns she is a volunteer, she quits. Abbi meets Ilana at the volunteer center, where they encounter Mrs. Clinton. Ilana tells Mrs. Clinton that she cannot continue to volunteer but that she will continue supporting her via Twitter. Guest stars: Alan Alda, Hillary Clinton, Rachel Dratch, Cynthia Nixon
26	6	"Philadelphia"	Todd Biermann	Abbi Jacobson & Ilana Glazer	March 23, 2016	306	0.569
Ilana accompanies Abbi as she returns home to Wayne, Pennsylvania in order to clean out her childhood bedroom in the house in which her divorced father (Tony Danza) still lives. While doing so she realizes she still has the money she raised from a dance-a-thon she held to raise money for her childhood friend Alice Ackerman (Kelly Rohrbach), who was hit by a school bus – and Ilana finds a valuable JonBenét Ramsey Beanie Baby. Abbi meets and makes out with her high school classmate Shyffilis (Evan Jonigkeit) at a bowling alley. While traveling across various parts of Wayne trying to track down Alice, Abbi and Ilana frequently find themselves needing to spend the fundraiser money in order to continue searching for her. They finally reach Alice's home only to realize she is very tall, attractive, lives in a mansion and has a successful modeling career. They also see Shyffilis there, who is Alice's partner. Alice is angry with Abbi and Shyffilis for kissing each other. Abbi gives Alice the Beanie Baby and the fundraiser money – only to be shamed by Alice for having spent most of the money. Guest stars: Tony Danza, Kelly Rohrbach, Evan Jonigkeit
27	7	"B&B-NYC"	Lucia Aniello	Paul W. Downs & Lucia Aniello	March 30, 2016	307	0.631
While video chatting with each other on the toilet, Abbi and Ilana decide to post their apartments on a BnB listing website for the night because Jaimé and Bevers are away. When their plan to camp out on the roof of Ilana's apartment building fails due to their tent being blown onto the street by a gust of wind, Ilana goes to Lincoln's apartment – but he has a girl with him. Abbi and Ilana decide to stay out until their guests leave in the morning. In the street, they overhear a man talking on the phone about a party – and gatecrash it, pretending to have been invited. Abbi goes back to her apartment to hook up with her handsome young guest, to find her apartment ransacked and him having fled. At the party, Ilana seduces Blake Griffin – and he takes her to his place. They get 'creative' when they cannot have intercourse due to Blake's penis being too large for her to receive it. Abbi invites Trey to spend the night at her apartment so that she will feel safe. Abbi and Trey watch Ratatouille and then have sex for the first time. Abbi decides to not mention Trey's visit or their sex to Ilana. Ilana gleefully tells Abbi that Blake fingered her until she came. Guest star: Blake Griffin
28	8	"Burning Bridges"	Lucia Aniello	Abbi Jacobson & Ilana Glazer	April 6, 2016	308	0.591
Abbi gives a cup of her urine to Ilana which she intends to pass off as her own at a urine test. Seconds later, Ilana collides with another pedestrian, spilling it. While having sex in the shower, Abbi and Trey make plans to go on their first date. He wants a relationship with her but she wants them to be sex friends. While Abbi and Ilana are sitting in the park, Abbi continues to hide her involvement with Trey from her. Lincoln arrives at the park and informs Ilana that he has a girlfriend and they are to be monogamous, so he will not continue being sex buddies with Ilana. She suggests they be friends, but he rejects that suggestion. Ilana is shocked and runs away, then meets up with her brother Eliot and their parents Bobbi (Susie Essman) and Arthur (Bob Balaban). The family dine at a restaurant to celebrate Bobbi and Arthur's 35th wedding anniversary. When Abbi arrives for her date with Trey, she realizes that she is at the same restaurant as the Wexlers. Bobbi spots her and invites her to join them. The rest of the episode is an homage to Mrs. Doubtfire, where Abbi spends the evening running back and forth between both tables, and drinking heavily. Bobbi begins choking on a lychee, and Abbi calls for Trey from across the restaurant to save Bobbi, which he does by performing the Heimlich maneuver. He tells them that he is on a date with Abbi, leaving Ilana angry that Abbi did not tell her about her fling with Trey. Eliot says that he has been given a promotion and is moving to London. When trying to console a distraught Ilana, Abbi tells her that she did not tell her because she was embarrassed and that he means nothing to her, is a guilty pleasure and a joke. Trey overhears this, is disappointed with Abbi, and walks off. Ilana tells Abbi that the main reason for her being upset is Lincoln no longer wanting her in his life. Guest stars: Mara Wilson, Susie Essman, Bob Balaban
29	9	"Getting There"	Todd Biermann	Abbi Jacobson & Ilana Glazer	April 13, 2016	309	0.530
Part 1 of 2. Abbi and Ilana take part in a yoga class. They then make their way to the airport for their trip to Israel, paid by Jewish organisation Birthmark. They find themselves racing against time when the subway train they are on has to stop due to a suicide on the track and because Ilana forgot her passport. They cannot find a taxi driver to take them, so the 15-year-old son of one of them drives them to retrieve the passport from Jaimé, then to John F. Kennedy International Airport. Ilana tells Abbi that she is carrying cannabis in her vagina. They rush to board the plane. They find that their seats have been assigned well apart from each other in a section of the plane that is full of young Jewish adults who are on the same Birthmark trip – which is led by Jared (Seth Green). Guest star: Seth Green
30	10	"Jews on a Plane"	John Lee	Abbi Jacobson & Ilana Glazer	April 20, 2016	310	0.626
Part 2 of 2. During their flight to Israel, Abbi and Ilana struggle to find people to switch seats with on the plane so that they can sit near to each other. They finally manage to sit either side of an obese dead man. Abbi's period starts, but she does not have tampons with her, because she was forced to put her bag in the luggage compartment. Abbi and Ilana struggle to find a tampon. Ilana fellates Jared in the toilet. Two flight attendants overhear Abbi describing her period as an "explosion". They are both apprehended by the flight attendants, suspected of being terrorists. When they land in Israel, they are interrogated and then deported. They discuss Jesus Christ on the plane home. Guest stars: Adam Levine, Seth Green, Tracee Ellis Ross, Tymberlee Hill

=== Season 4 (2017) ===
No. overall	No. in season	Title	Directed by	Written by	Original release date	Prod. code	U.S. viewers (millions)
31	1	"Sliding Doors"	Lucia Aniello	Abbi Jacobson & Ilana Glazer	September 13, 2017	401	0.879
The origin story of Abbi and Ilana's friendship takes the audience back to 2011, where it is cut between two timelines as in the film Sliding Doors. Each reveals a different scenario where they first meet and later became friends, along with details about their overall lives at that time. In both scenarios, they meet at a NYC subway station. From there, one story involves them boarding a subway train and going through the day separately. This scenario shows Abbi meeting Bevers for the first time at her apartment – he is nice and is in good shape. It shows Ilana in a relationship with Jaimé while they are both students at New York University. The girls meet by chance on a bench towards the end of the episode. In the other scenario, they miss their train and they spend the day together. Ilana is fired from her job in both scenarios, but for different reasons. Guest star: Constance Shulman
32	2	"Twaining Day"	Lucia Aniello	Paul W. Downs & Lucia Aniello	September 20, 2017	402	0.614
Abbi and Ilana escort patients through a protest outside an abortion clinic. Ilana starts a new job as a waitress at a trendy restaurant in Manhattan called Sushi Mambeaux. The staff and the boss Marcel (RuPaul) frequently insult people. A package for Abbi – a four-year supply of Plan B – is delivered to Soulstice. She lies to her boss, Dara, so that she can retrieve it in person. She tries to avoid Trey, but he sees her – and they train Shania Twain together. Abbi and Trey have sex together at Soulstice, but have to stop when Trey suffers a penile fracture and is taken to hospital. As Trey is being wheeled off on a gurney, Abbi asks Mike – one of the paramedics – for his phone number. She tells him that she is a "relationship gal" and tells Ilana that she is dating Mike. Guest stars: Wanda Sykes, RuPaul, Shania Twain, Sandra Bernhard
33	3	"Just the Tips"	Neil Daly	Paul W. Downs & Lucia Aniello	September 27, 2017	403	0.709
Abbi and Ilana Heimlich a choking man through the railings of Gramercy Park, but he will not let them in the park. Abbi fabricates a relationship out of her meaningless six-day fling with Mike. She ends her delusion after her attempt to give advice to an unhappy wife ends with her laughing at Abbi and Mike telling her during a phone call that he has been having sex with two other people during their fling. Ilana is flush with cash from work. She spends $480 on having nail tips put on her fingers and toes, and buys a slutty leotard from a sex shop. She goes to a party – where a combination of cheese, champagne, cocaine, and bumping into Lincoln and his girlfriend Steph result in her soiling herself. Lincoln and Ilana have a conversation in the toilet. Ilana goes home, where Jaimé and Abbi help her take her fake nails off. Guest star: Naren Weiss, Miriam Shor
34	4	"Mushrooms"	Nicholas Jasenovec	Abbi Jacobson	October 11, 2017	404	0.516
Abbi and Ilana take psilocybin mushrooms and trip as they walk through NYC. Dara tells Abbi to collect 100 macarons from a pastry shop and bring them to her house, where she is holding a birthday party for her wife. Abbi brings the macarons to Dara's house and Ilana comes along. Abbi accidentally kills Dara's cat, so Dara fires her and tells her to leave. Ilana meets a couple who invite her to their house to have a threesome with them – but she takes too long to get ready, so the threesome does not happen. Guest star: Alysia Reiner
35	5	"Abbi's Mom"	Nicholas Jasenovec	Ilana Glazer	October 18, 2017	405	0.548
Ilana is using a light box to cope with her seasonal affective disorder. Abbi's mother, 55-year-old Joanne, (Peri Gilpin) comes to the city for a visit. Joanne tells Abbi that she had a benign lump in her breast, which made her think about all the things that she has never done and wants to do. Bevers walks in wearing just his underpants, which Abbi is horrified by – but Joanne finds him attractive. Abbi and Joanne (wearing a tight, short dress of Abbi's) go to Sushi Mambeaux, where Ilana is attracted to Joanne. Marcel tells the staff that whoever makes the most money in tips that night will take home everyone's tips – and whoever makes the least in tips will be fired. Joanne is shocked when Abbi tells her that she has had sex with 32 men. She feels she has missed out by only having had sex with three men – her first boyfriend, Abbi's father and her husband – and has never had anal sex. Abbi and Joanne smoke cannabis together outside the restaurant. Joanne climbs on top of a table in the restaurant and falls off it. Outside, Joanne French kisses Ilana's young colleague Owen. Abbi, Ilana and Marcel see them – and Marcel fires Owen. Parker finally tells Marcel that he is his son. Marcel accepts this and immediately fires Parker, saying he doesn't work with family. Abbi, Ilana and Joanne go to a sex shop. Guest star: Peri Gilpin
36	6	"Witches"	Abbi Jacobson	Gabe Liedman	October 25, 2017	406	0.602
Abbi freaks out about aging after discovering a gray hair. Abbi needs a heater and sells Christmas cards in the street in Manhattan which she had made. Abbi is concerned that she has a lot in common with elderly stallholder Margo (Jane Curtin). Ilana leaves Abbi to sell them alone as she visits a sex therapist, Betty (Marcella Lowery), to recapture her sexual spark. Ilana realizes that she has not orgasmed since the election. Ilana talks to Betty and orgasms in front of her. One of Abbi's customers a 51-year-old dermatologist (Greta Lee) who looks a lot younger than she is; Abbi has botox injections at her clinic. Another of Abbi's customer's is Jeremy, who is no longer her neighbor, accompanied by his partner and their adopted baby. When Abbi and Ilana meet up, their table has disappeared. Abbi, Ilana, Betty and Margo attend a winter solstice ceremony with several other people in the park. Ilana buys Abbi a heater. Ilana sees many more gray hairs on Abbi's head and dyes them black. Guest star: Jane Curtin, Marcella Lowery, Greta Lee
37	7	"Florida"	Ilana Glazer	Jen Statsky	November 8, 2017	407	0.563
Abbi, Ilana, Eliot and Bobbi take a trip to Florida to clean out Grandma Esther's apartment along with Bobbi's sister, Bev (Fran Drescher). Eliot's suitcase is lost during the journey. Abbi and Ilana decide to stay in the area and rent an apartment; they change their minds because there are too few LGBT people and non-whites for their liking. Abbi, Ilana, Eliot, Bobbi and Bev smoke marijuana together – during which Bobbi says that Lincoln has changed his status on Facebook to single. Ilana and Abbi drive back to NYC in the car that Ilana inherited. Ilana goes to Lincoln's apartment. Guest star: Fran Drescher
38	8	"House-Sitting"	Abbi Jacobson	Josh Rabinowitz	November 15, 2017	408	0.561
Ilana house sits for the Strands when they go to the Hamptons. She invites Jaimé and Lincoln to their palatial house. Jaimé was circumcised recently and has to avoid getting an erection while his penis heals. Ilana and Lincoln define their relationship as boyfriend and girlfriend. Abbi finds her high school English studies teacher Mr. Miller (Mike Birbiglia) on Bumble and invites him to the house. After he arrives, she and he tell each other that they were attracted to each other when he taught her. Abbi decides not to have sex with Mr. Miller, because she finds it creepy that he wants to roleplay that she is 17. The tumble dryer catches fire, then they all go outside and the FDNY put it out. Guest star: Amy Ryan
39	9	"Bedbugs"	Ilana Glazer	Abbi Jacobson & Ilana Glazer	November 29, 2017	409	0.450
Abbi goes to a convenience store, where she tries to obtain a refund from teenage Muslim girl Massouma for out-of-date Dunk-a-roos which Abbi bought there. Massouma refuses, and is disappointed that Abbi cannot remember her name. Ilana gives a dog to Lincoln, an iPad to Eliot and a designer handbag to Abbi. Ilana and Jaimé have an infestation of bed bugs in their apartment, which started in a bag of cash. Marcel tells Ilana that a member of staff had been using Sushi Mambeaux as a brothel during the hours that it was closed. A middle-aged man (Steve Buscemi) with a pistol forces Abbi from the sidewalk into Massouma's convenience store, where he forces Abbi to withdraw cash from the ATM then steals her cash and bag. Massouma holds a pump action shotgun to the mugger's head and he leaves with the cash and bag. Abbi starts a new job in Anthropologie, which she expects to be designing the window display; she is disappointed to find out that she is a security guard. Guest star: Steve Buscemi, Lea DeLaria, Cynthia Erivo
40	10	"Friendiversary"	Nicholas Jasenovec	Abbi Jacobson & Ilana Glazer	December 6, 2017	410	0.401
Ilana leads Abbi on a scavenger hunt, which leads to dinner with her in a café. Ilana says that they are celebrating their 'friendiversary'. Ilana give Abbi a necklace which had been owned by her great-grandmother. Abbi forgot their friendiversary, so she gives Ilana a hydrating face mask which she has on her. Abbi's gift disappoints Ilana, so Abbi says that she is taking her to the top of the Empire State Building. They look through a telescope there, where they see a man appearing to throw a woman over the balcony. They report it to the police, but they do not do anything because there is no evidence. Abbi and Ilana follow the man and get into his apartment, where they hide in his closet. He confronts them and tells them that the "woman" was a sex doll which he accidentally pushed off the balcony whilst penetrating it. Two policemen arrive and laugh at the story, and the man says he does not want to press charges. Abbi and Ilana go to the bench where they went to in the first episode of this season, and Abbi gives the necklace back to Ilana. Guest star: Denis O'Hare

=== Season 5 (2019) ===
No. overall	No. in season	Title	Directed by	Written by	Original release date	U.S. viewers (millions)
41	1	"Stories"	Nick Paley	Abbi Jacobson & Ilana Glazer	January 24, 2019	0.408
Abbi and Ilana celebrate Abbi's 30th birthday by live streaming their walk through Manhattan, during which they encounter a little girl alone in the Manhattan Mall and decide to take her to the security office, but are stopped by the child's mother, Lindsey AKA "Cheese", who knew Abbi when they were at college together. Lindsay is angry with Abbi and Ilana, but they reconcile when they meet again later that day. Abbi and Ilana meet Jaimé, his new boyfriend Johnny and Lincoln – and they all have lunch together.
42	2	"SheWork and S... Bucket"	Abbi Jacobson	Lisa McQuillan	January 31, 2019	0.386
Ilana goes to what she thinks is a job interview for an office manager position, but she is at the wrong address and the two men she is talking to are managers of a YouWork centre and think she is there to rent an office. Ilana puts furniture in the street and charges smokers to use it, calling her business SheWork. The YouWork managers tell Ilana to close SheWork and give her $500 to do so. She tells all her customers to leave because the business is closing. Abbi's toilet is blocked and the building's landlord, Fernando Hernandez, tells her that she should use a shitbucket – a separate garbage can that is used for toilet paper. The plumber says that the other residents of her apartment block use shitbuckets and that he grew up using one. She holds a tenants' meeting in order to make a collective written complaint about how the building is run, including the need for shitbuckets and the inadequate heating. Abbi gives the complaint to Fernando. She receives a note under her door informing her that Fernando has been fired, that a plumbing company will carry out repairs in the next few days and that all tenants' rent will be increased to cover the cost.
43	3	"Bitcoin & the Missing Girl"	Lilly Burns	Paul W. Downs & Lucia Aniello	February 7, 2019	0.313
Bobbi takes Ilana and Abbi shopping for bras. Ilana remembers that she bought some bitcoins several years ago with her then lover. She finds him, and he gives her $8,265 – the value of her share of their bitcoin. Abbi takes her laundry to a laundromat; they lose a sweatshirt of hers which she is fond of. She puts up posters of herself in the sweatshirt in order to try to recover it. She is reported as missing on TV, so she phones a TV channel to tell them that she was never missing. The sweatshirt is handed in to the laundromat, who give it to Abbi. Guest star: Mark Consuelos
44	4	"Make the Space"	Ilana Glazer	Jen Statsky	February 14, 2019	0.269
Abbi asks her manager Lisa if she may organise the window display at Anthropologie. She is disappointed when Lisa says no. Abbi goes ahead without permission and as a result is fired and banned from all branches of the chain. Ilana goes into Jaimé's room for the first time ever because of a bad smell from there. She is horrified to see that he is a hoarder. She later talks to him in front of his boyfriend Johnny and Abbi. Jaimé says that he is going to move in with Johnny in Montclair, New Jersey. Abbi is horrified that Ilana uses the same cheese grater to remove dead skin from her feet as she uses for grating cheese, even after Ilana tells her that she immerses it in a jar of barbicide before using it to grate cheese.
45	5	"Artsy Fartsy"	Ilana Glazer	Abbi Jacobson	February 21, 2019	0.251
Donna invites Abbi and Ilana to a party at her workplace, the Museum of Modern Art. Abbi accepts, but Ilana declines because she is having a 1-year anniversary dinner with Lincoln. The couple exchange presents and negotiate various aspects of their relationship. Lincoln is determined to move back to Maryland, marry and have children. Ilana wants to continue living in NYC, be polyamorous, study psychology and not have a child until she is 43. As a result of them wanting very different things from life, the couple amicably split. At the party, Abbi falls over and is taken to hospital where she and a doctor, Lesley, are attracted to each other. Abbi asks Lesley out, and she accepts.
46	6	"Lost and Found"	Lucia Aniello	Paul W. Downs & Lucia Aniello	February 28, 2019	0.291
Ilana is delighted to discover that she is distantly related to a 91-year-old Holocaust survivor, Saul who lives in Manhattan. She and Ilana visit him at his rest home and sneak him out to take him shopping at his request. Abbi and Ilana are delighted to see Alan Cumming, but Saul has not heard of him. They follow Cumming to a drag brunch. While Abbi and Ilana are talking to Cumming, Saul boards a bus. The girls go to the home to tell the receptionist that they lost him. She angrily informs them that he always goes to IKEA when he gets out, and tells them to bring him back. The girls go to IKEA and find him shopping there. Lesley gives Abbi a bright yellow hat, which she wears despite her, Ilana and Saul disliking it. After wearing it all day, she tells Lesley that she dislikes it and Lesley accepts that she need not wear it. Guest star: Alan Cumming
47	7	"Shenanigans"	Paul W. Downs	Gabe Liedman	March 7, 2019	0.304
Ilana is delighted to be accepted into Hunter College as well as being recruited as for a modelling shoot. She develops severe conjunctivitis, which prevents her from doing the shoot, which Bobbi does instead. Ilana does not have a doctor in NYC, so she goes to her vet acquaintance's surgery to receive a hepatitis B vaccine. Lesley ends her fling with Abbi, saying that Abbi is not an adult yet and that Abbi's life is a series of wild shenanigans. Hurt by the break up (by the reality of what Lesley said) and encouraged by a different friend, Abbi applies for an artist residency in Colorado. Guest star: Janeane Garofalo
48	8	"Sleep No More"	Lucia Aniello	Ilana Glazer	March 14, 2019	0.327
Ilana interviews for a replacement roommate. Abbi takes Ilana to Sleep No More in preparation to tell her about her career move. After Ilana asks Abbi to be her roommate, Abbi tells Ilana that she has been accepted to an artists' residency program in Boulder, Colorado which begins in two weeks' time. Ilana has an epic freak out which causes them to be ejected from the performance. Afterward, Abbi explains that she wants to change her life, become a successful artist and leave NYC. Ultimately angry and hurt with Abbi for choosing to leave, Ilana finally gives her blessing. Ilana's new roommate moves in, along with her two Great Danes named Jay-Z and Beyoncé.
49	9	"Along Came Molly"	Abbi Jacobson	Eliot Glazer	March 21, 2019	0.274
Abbi, Ilana and Bevers sell some of Abbi's things on the street. They decide to keep one of the items, the couch. However, the garbage truck takes it away, so the girls jump on the back of it and retrieve it from the depot. They leave it outside a Lil Wayne concert, in order to take it home afterwards. They take an MDMA pill each and are rejected due to the tickets they bought on Craigslist being counterfeit. They try to find a way to sneak into the concert. On the journey home, they realise that they forgot the couch. Bevers tells Abbi that he sold everything, but he actually has a lot of it in his room. Guest star: Sam Jay
50	10	"Broad City"	Lucia Aniello	Abbi Jacobson & Ilana Glazer	March 28, 2019	0.299
Abbi and Ilana set out a mission to get Abbi's last bodega bacon, egg, and cheese sandwich before moving. They fail to find one before bodegas stop selling them at 11AM. Ilana finds a valuable toilet on the street; she and Abbi roll it on a skateboard towards Ilana's apartment. When they stop to talk on the Brooklyn Bridge, Ilana and Abbi reflect on their friendship. Ilana becomes emotional and says her "final goodbye" to Abbi. When Ilana leaves the toilet for Abbi to keep, it is taken. Ilana organises a party on the roof of her apartment building, attended by several people who know them, as well as some of Abbi's neighbors. Abbi and Ilana say their last goodbye to each other, before she moves 1,800 miles away to Boulder, Colorado. Four months later, they remain friends and frequently phone each other.

== Ratings ==
Broad City : U.S. viewers per episode (thousands)

Season	Episode number										Average
Season	1	2	3	4	5	6	7	8	9	10	Average
1	914	867	897	793	784	924	857	854	875	812	858
2	863	845	659	771	760	744	661	684	763	672	742
3	772	633	599	574	640	569	631	591	530	626	617
4	879	614	709	516	548	602	563	561	450	401	584
5	408	386	313	269	251	291	304	327	274	299	312

Audience measurement performed by Nielsen Media Research
