= Broad City =

American comedy TV series (2014–2019)

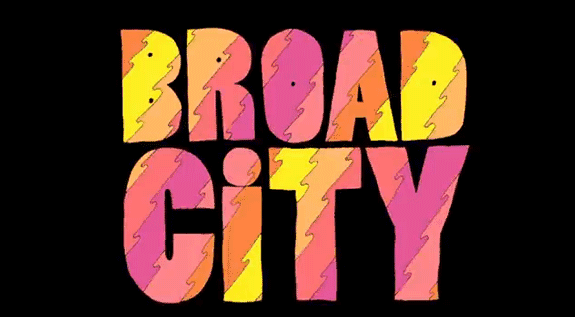
- Genre: Sitcom
- Created by: Ilana Glazer; Abbi Jacobson
- Based on: Broad City by Ilana Glazer; Abbi Jacobson
- Showrunners: Ilana Glazer; Abbi Jacobson; Tami Sagher (season 1)
- Starring: Abbi Jacobson; Ilana Glazer
- Opening theme: "Latino & Proud" by DJ Raff
- Country of origin: United States
- Original language: English
- No. of seasons: 5
- No. of episodes: 50 (list of episodes)

Production
- Executive producers: Ilana Glazer; Abbi Jacobson; Amy Poehler; Dave Becky; Tony Hernandez; Samantha Saifer; Paul W. Downs; Lucia Aniello
- Producers: Lilly Burns; John Skidmore
- Animator: Mike Perry
- Running time: 22 minutes
- Production companies: Paper Kite Productions; 3 Arts Entertainment; Jax Media; Comedy Partners

Original release
- Network: Comedy Central
- Release: January 22, 2014 – March 28, 2019

Broad City is an American television sitcom created by and starring Ilana Glazer and Abbi Jacobson. It was developed from their independent web series of the same name, which was produced between 2009 and 2011. The sitcom, like the web series, is based on Glazer and Jacobson's real-life friendship, and their attempt to "make it" in New York. The sitcom premiered on Comedy Central on January 22, 2014, and aired for five seasons, ending on March 28, 2019. The show received critical acclaim throughout its run and has been ranked among the best television shows of the 2010s.

== Premise ==
The series focuses on the lives of best friends, Abbi Abrams and Ilana Wexler, as they attempt to navigate day-to-day life in New York City.

== Cast ==
=== Main cast ===
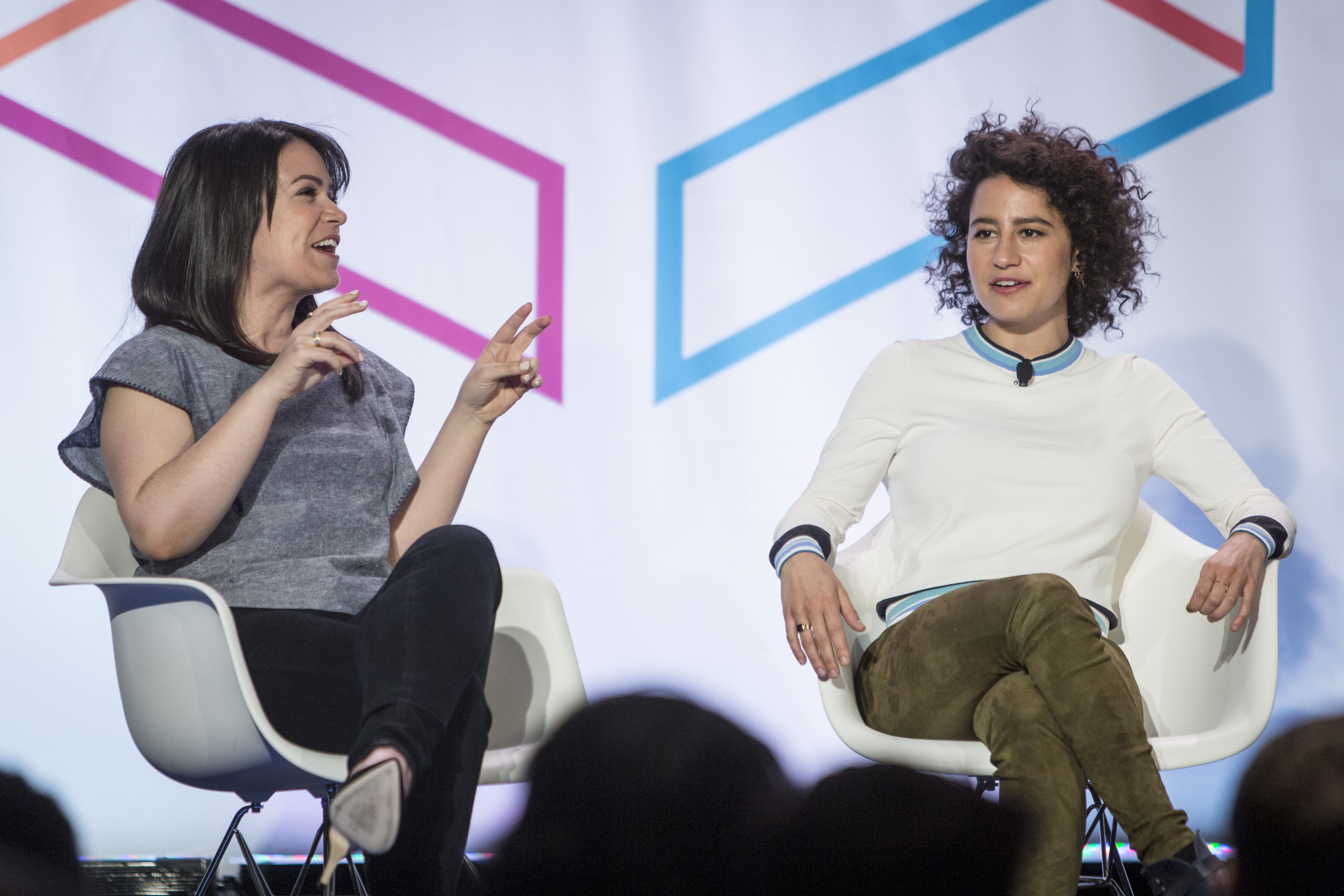
Jacobson (left) and Glazer (right) at Internet Week New York in May 2015

- Abbi Jacobson as Abbi Abrams, who was born in 1988 and is from the Philadelphia Main Line. She lives in Astoria, Queens, and is an aspiring artist.
- Ilana Glazer as Ilana Wexler, a New York University graduate from Long Island. She lives in Gowanus, Brooklyn, and is an extroverted slacker and marijuana enthusiast.

=== Recurring cast ===
- Hannibal Buress as Lincoln Rice, DDS – a pediatric dentist with whom Ilana has a casual sexual relationship, though Lincoln would prefer an exclusive relationship.
- Paul W. Downs as Trey Pucker – Abbi's friendly boss at Soulstice, who is oblivious to her desire to become a trainer.
- John Gemberling as Matt Bevers – The lazy, mooching boyfriend of Abbi's absent roommate, Melody, who is a constant unwelcome presence in Abbi's apartment.
- Arturo Castro as Jaimé Castro – Ilana's roommate
- Stephen Schneider as Jeremy Santos – Abbi's across-the-hall neighbor that she has a crush on.
- Chris Gethard as Todd (seasons 1-2; guest season 3) – Ilana's boss at Deals! Deals! Deals!, a fictional web "deal" company. He struggles to manage Ilana, who comes and goes as she pleases, rarely works and dresses inappropriately for the office.
- Nicole Drespel as Nicole – Ilana's co-worker and desk mate, who deeply resents Ilana's unprofessional behavior.
- Eliot Glazer as Eliot Wexler – Ilana's level-headed brother, played by Ilana Glazer's real-life brother.
- D'Arcy Carden as Gemma (season 3; guest seasons 1-2, 5) – A trainer at Soulstice who is awkwardly friendly toward Abbi.
- Susie Essman as Bobbi Wexler (seasons 4-5; guest seasons 2-3) – Ilana and Eliot's mother, who lives on Long Island. She is blunt and frequently confrontational.
- Bob Balaban as Arthur Wexler (guest seasons 2-3, 5) – Ilana and Eliot's loving father who lives on Long Island.
- RuPaul as Marcel (season 4) - Ilana's ruthless manager at Sushi Mambeaux
- Wanda Sykes as Dara (season 4) - The owner of a graphic design firm, who employs Abbi as her assistant.
- Clea DuVall as Lesley Marnel (season 5) - A doctor and romantic interest of Abbi.

=== Guest cast ===
- Fred Armisen
- Alan Alda
- Sandra Bernhard
- Steve Buscemi
- Patricia Clarkson
- Hillary Clinton
- Alan Cumming
- Jane Curtin
- Tony Danza
- Fran Drescher
- Cynthia Erivo
- Janeane Garofalo
- Whoopi Goldberg
- Seth Green
- Adam Levine
- Jason Mantzoukas
- Cynthia Nixon
- Amy Poehler
- Kelly Ripa
- Chris Rock
- Seth Rogen
- Amy Sedaris
- Alia Shawkat
- Shania Twain
- Vanessa Williams
- Mara Wilson

== Episodes ==
Season	Episodes	Originally released	
Season	Episodes	First released	Last released
1	10	January 22, 2014	March 26, 2014
2	10	January 14, 2015	March 18, 2015
3	10	February 17, 2016	April 20, 2016
4	10	September 13, 2017	December 6, 2017
5	10	January 24, 2019	March 28, 2019

== Production ==
=== Development of web series ===
Glazer and Jacobson met in New York City, where they both attended courses at the Upright Citizens Brigade and were part of a small improv comedy group, Secret Promise Circle. The web series began after Jacobson received poor feedback on a project she and a partner had been working on. Jacobson expressed her frustration to Glazer, and the two decided to work together on a project that became the web series. In February 2010 they started their own web series on YouTube, which proved popular.

Jacobson met Paul W. Downs in improv class and both Jacobson and Glazer met Lucia Aniello through the Upright Citizens Brigade. Both were fans of the web series pilot and Aniello would then direct one episode of the web series. The web series ran for two seasons and the finale starred Amy Poehler.

=== Development of TV pilot and first season ===
Amy Poehler became aware of the series and mentored Glazer and Jacobson, becoming executive producer when the show came to TV. When Glazer and Jacobson wrote the pilot script, their characters were named Evelyn Wexler and Carly Abrams respectively, but ended up using their real first names instead. Poehler, Glazer, and Jacobson went to Los Angeles to pitch the pilot. The show was originally pitched to FX, who bought the script and passed a year later, due to it being "too girly", according to Jacobson. Comedy Central committed to the show in 2012 and the pilot was developed, with Aniello directing. For the first season, Jacobson and Glazer were paired with Tami Sagher, an experienced showrunner, with Downs, Aniello, and Chris Kelly completing the writing room. Downs and Aniello would also produce the show, with Downs appearing as Trey in the series.

Throughout its run, the show featured notable guest stars including Wanda Sykes, Kelly Ripa, Amy Poehler, Fran Drescher, Shania Twain, Hillary Clinton, and RuPaul. Broad City: High Score, a mobile game developed and published by Built Games, was released on April 20, 2018.

=== Second season ===
After the first season, Glazer and Jacobson parted ways with Sagher and became the showrunners. The second season premiered on January 14, 2015, and was renewed for a third season ahead of the premiere.

=== Final season ===
Glazer and Jacobson decided to end the show after five seasons. Of their final season, Glazer said: "I feel like we've raised these kids, Abbi Abrams and Ilana Wexler, and we're sending them to college". "We didn't want to just go until it got canceled. We wanted to choose to end it so that it could end as strong as possible. We chose this ending to honor the characters." In their final season, Glazer and Jacobson open with an episode that unfolds like a long Instagram story. Throughout the season, the characters go to MoMA as well as drag brunch.

== Reception ==
=== Critical reception ===
Review aggregation website Metacritic gave season one a score of 75 out of 100, based on reviews from 14 critics. Karen Valby from Entertainment Weekly described the show as a "deeply weird, weirdly sweet, and completely hilarious comedy". The Wall Street Journal referred to the show as "Sneak Attack Feminism". Critic Megan Angelo quotes Abbi Jacobson, main star of Comedy Central's Broad City: "If you watch one of our episodes, there's not a big message, but if you watch all of them, I think, they're empowering to women." The A.V. Club critic Caroline Framke wrote that Broad City was "worth watching" despite its "well-trod premise", and that the series is "remarkably self-possessed, even in its first episode". Critics have compared the show to Seinfeld, especially due to the characters' perceived lack of personal development as well as humor involving the minutiae of daily life.

Season one of the show received a 96% rating from Rotten Tomatoes, based on reviews from 23 critics, with the site's consensus stating, "From its talented producers to its clever writing and superb leads, Broad City boasts an uncommonly fine pedigree." The A.V. Club named Broad City the second best TV show of 2014, Slate named it the best show of the year, and Screen Rant named it the 5th best of the year. The Writers Guild Foundation listed the script for the first season finale "The Last Supper" as one of the best scripts of the 2010s, describing the show as "a benchmark for writing about buddies".

Season two received positive reviews, with Metacritic giving it a score of 89 out of 100, based on reviews from eight critics. Rotten Tomatoes gave the second season a rating of 100%, based on reviews from 11 critics, with the site's consensus: "Led by two of the funniest women on TV, Broad City uses its stars' vibrant chemistry to lend an element of authenticity to the show's chaotic yet enlightening brand of comedy." Broad City again appeared on end-of-year lists for 2015, placing fifth on Time Out's list and second on Rolling Stone's list. Vox named it the second funniest show on television and The Atlantic named "Wisdom Teeth" one of the best episodes of TV that year.

Season three received positive reviews as well, with Metacritic giving it a score of 87 out of 100, based on reviews from eight critics. Ben Travers from Indiewire summarizes what he sees as the strengths of the first two episodes of season three: "Each half-hour feels as free-wheeling and wild as Ilana so boldly is, but also as meticulously put-together as Abby [sic] strives to be ... the integration of its two creators attitudes into the core makeup of the series helps to illustrate how groundbreaking Broad City really is". In 2016, Broad City placed 18th in Complex's best shows of the year, 15th on Den of Geek's list, and 14th on Esquire's mid-year list.

Season four received positive reviews, with Metacritic giving it a score of 85 out of 100, based on reviews from five critics. Rotten Tomatoes gave the season a rating of 100%, based on reviews from 23 critics, with the site's consensus: "Pizza and weird are always in season for Abbi and Ilana in their fourth, wintery year of Broad City's weed-infused escapades." NME named Broad City the 20th-best TV show of the year for 2017.

The final season also received positive reviews, with Metacritic giving it a score of 80 out of 100, based on reviews from five critics. Rotten Tomatoes gave the season a rating of 100%, based on reviews from 25 critics, with the site's consensus: "Glazer and Jacobson give the people exactly what they want in Broad City's final season – relatable content, questionable intimacy, and ingenious escapades through the glorious squalor of IRL NYC." Broad City was named one of the best shows of the year by Junkee and "Stories" was named one of the best TV episodes of the year by Decider.

Broad City appeared on many best of the decade lists for television. Vanity Fair named Broad City the ninth-best show of the decade and Rolling Stone named it the 28th best show of the decade. It was also named the 20th, 34th and 41st best show of the decade, by Junkee, The A.V. Club and Film School Rejects, respectively. The Guardian named Broad City the 96th best TV show of the 21st century. The Advocate named the show the 15th-"Most Important LGBTQ TV Show" of the decade.

The show has been named as an influence on similar shows, such as PEN15 and Tuca & Bertie.

=== Ratings ===
The first season of Broad City performed well, averaging 1.2 million viewers per episode, becoming Comedy Central's highest-rated first season since 2012 among the younger demographics, including adults aged 18–34. Despite initial commercial success and ongoing positive critical reviews, by March 2016 the show was receiving well under 1 million viewers, with fewer than 600,000 tuning in during the second week of the month.

Ratings for seasons of Broad City
Season	Timeslot	Episode	First aired		Last aired		Avg. viewers (thousands)
Season	Timeslot	Episode	Date	Viewers (thousands)	Date	Viewers (thousands)	Avg. viewers (thousands)
1	Wednesday 10:30 pm	10	January 22, 2014	914	March 26, 2014	812	858
2	Wednesday 10:30 pm	10	January 14, 2015	863	March 18, 2015	672	742
3	Wednesday 10:00 pm	10	February 17, 2016	772	April 20, 2016	626	617
4	Wednesday 10:30 pm	10	September 13, 2017	879	December 6, 2017	401	584
5	Thursday 10:00 pm	10	January 24, 2019	408	March 28, 2019	299	312

=== Awards and nominations ===
Broad City has been nominated for several awards; it received five nominations at the Critics' Choice Television Awards, in 2014, where Ilana Glazer was nominated for Best Actress in a Comedy Series, while the series was nominated for Best Comedy Series and in 2015 where both Ilana Glazer and the series were again nominated within the same categories, with an additional nomination for guest star Susie Essman for Best Guest Performer in a Comedy Series The series received three further nominations in 2016 at the Dorian Awards for Unsung TV Show of the Year, the Gold Derby Awards for Best Comedy Series, and the Writers Guild of America Awards for Comedy Series Ilana Glazer and Abbi Jacobson were nominees of the MTV Movie & TV Award for Best Comedic Performance in 2017 Animation director Mike Perry won the Primetime Emmy Award for Outstanding Motion Design in 2018 and in 2019, Comedy Central was awarded The ReFrame Stamp within the Television (2017–2018) category.

== Home media ==
Home media releases of Broad City
DVD title	Episodes	Release date		Rating		Additional information
DVD title	Episodes	Region 1	Region 4	MPA-C	ACB	Additional information
Season 1	10	December 2, 2014	November 4, 2015	14A	MA15+	Features: 2-disc set; 220 minutes; 16:9 aspect ratio; English Dolby Digital 2.0; English SDH subtitles; Special features: Outtakes & deleted scenes; Video commentary on select episodes; Photo gallery; Includes map of "Broad City" drawn by Abbi
Season 2	10	January 5, 2016	April 6, 2016	14A	MA15+	Features: 2-disc set; 220 minutes; 16:9 aspect ratio; English Dolby Digital 2.0; English SDH subtitles; Also released on Blu-ray (Region A only - January 5, 2016)
Season 3	10	January 10, 2017	March 8, 2017	14A	MA15+	Features: 2-disc set; 210 minutes; 16:9 aspect ratio; English Dolby Digital 2.0; English SDH subtitles
Season 4	10	April 16, 2018	March 7, 2018	14A	MA15+	Features: 2-disc set; 215 minutes; 16:9 aspect ratio; English Dolby Digital 2.0; English SDH subtitles
Season 5	10	July 9, 2019	TBA	14A	—N/a	Features: 2-disc set; 222 minutes; 16:9 aspect ratio; English Dolby Digital 2.0; English SDH subtitles
The Complete Series	50	July 9, 2019	TBA	14A	—N/a	Features: 11-disc set; 1087 minutes; See individual releases for all other information
