= Ilana Glazer =

American comedian (born 1987)

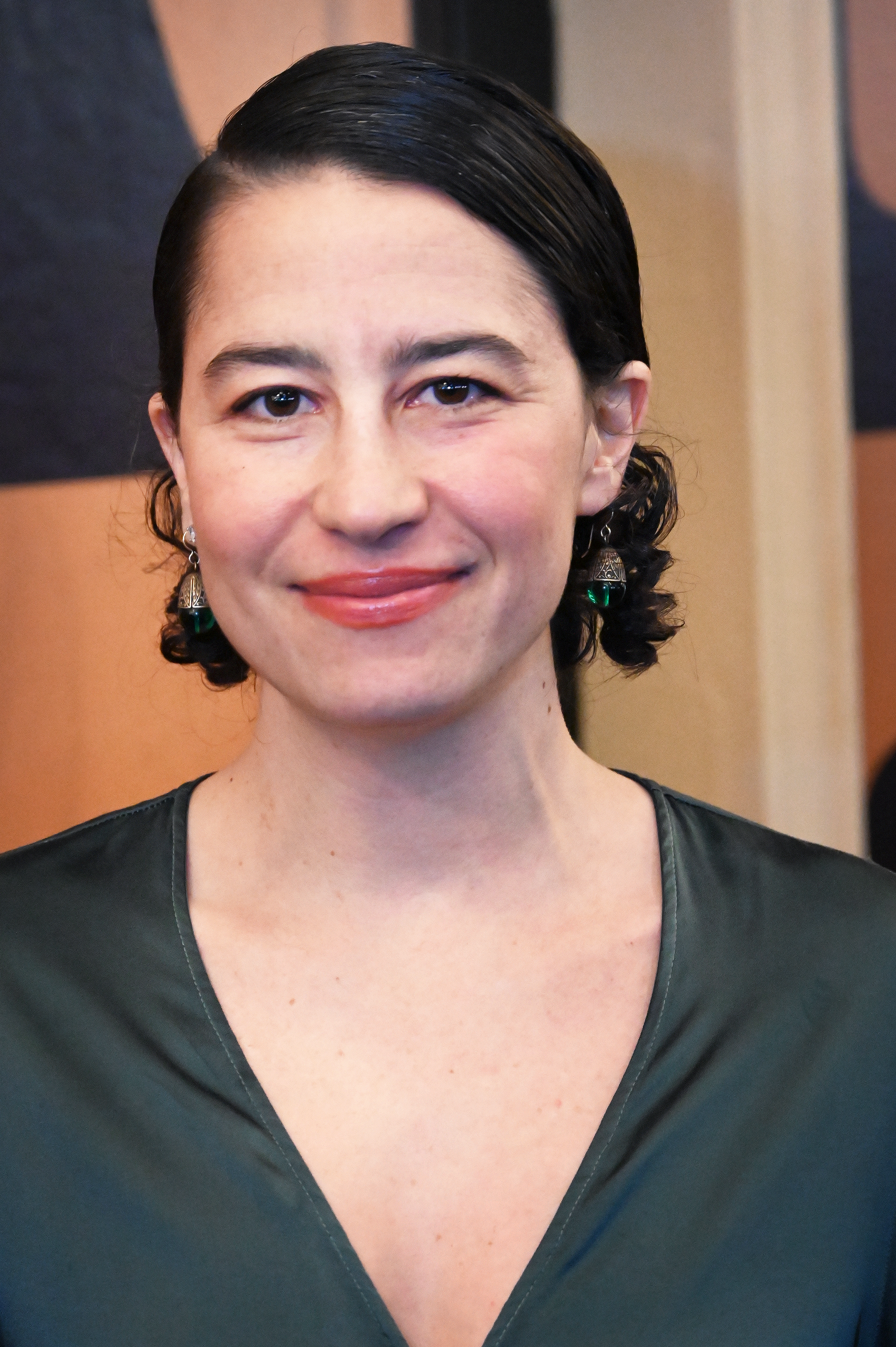
- Glazer in 2025
- Born: April 12, 1987 (age 39); New York City, U.S
- Education: New York University (BA)
- Spouse: David Rooklin (m. 2017)
- Children: 1
- Family: Eliot Glazer (brother)

Comedy career
- Years active: 2006–present
- Medium: Stand-up; television; film

Ilana Glazer (born April 12, 1987) is an American stand-up comedian, actor, writer, producer, director, and activist. They (Note: Glazer uses they/them and she/her pronouns. This article uses they/them for consistency.) have received various accolades including a Daytime Emmy Award and a Tony Award as well as nominations for four Primetime Emmy Awards.

Glazer started their career in improv comedy with the Upright Citizens Brigade Theatre. Glazer co-created and starred the Comedy Central series Broad City (2014–2019) with Abbi Jacobson. The series was based on the web series of the same name which ran from 2009 to 2011. They were twice nominated for the Critics' Choice Television Award for Best Actress in a Comedy Series for the series.

Glazer wrote, produced and starred in the horror film False Positive (2021) and the comedy Babes (2024). Glazer also had a leading role in the black comedy Rough Night (2017), and has released two stand-up specials, The Planet Is Burning (2020) and Human Magic (2025).

On stage, Glazer made their Broadway acting debut in the George Clooney play Good Night, and Good Luck (2025). They previously won the Tony Award for Best Musical as a producer for A Strange Loop (2022).

== Early life and education ==
Ilana Glazer was born on April 12, 1987, in New York City, the child of Sandi and Larry Glazer, who both work in insurance and finance. They grew up in a Reform Jewish family in St. James, New York, on Long Island and are of Ashkenazi Jewish descent. Their brother, Eliot Glazer, is a producer, writer, and actor with whom they have worked on shows like The Boys Presents: Diabolical and Broad City where he plays their brother.

Glazer graduated from New York University in 2009, majoring in psychology.

== Career ==
=== 2006–2008: Early comedy work ===
Glazer began taking classes at the Upright Citizens Brigade Theatre in 2006, and performed around New York City doing improv and stand-up for the next several years.

=== 2009–2019: Breakthrough with Broad City ===
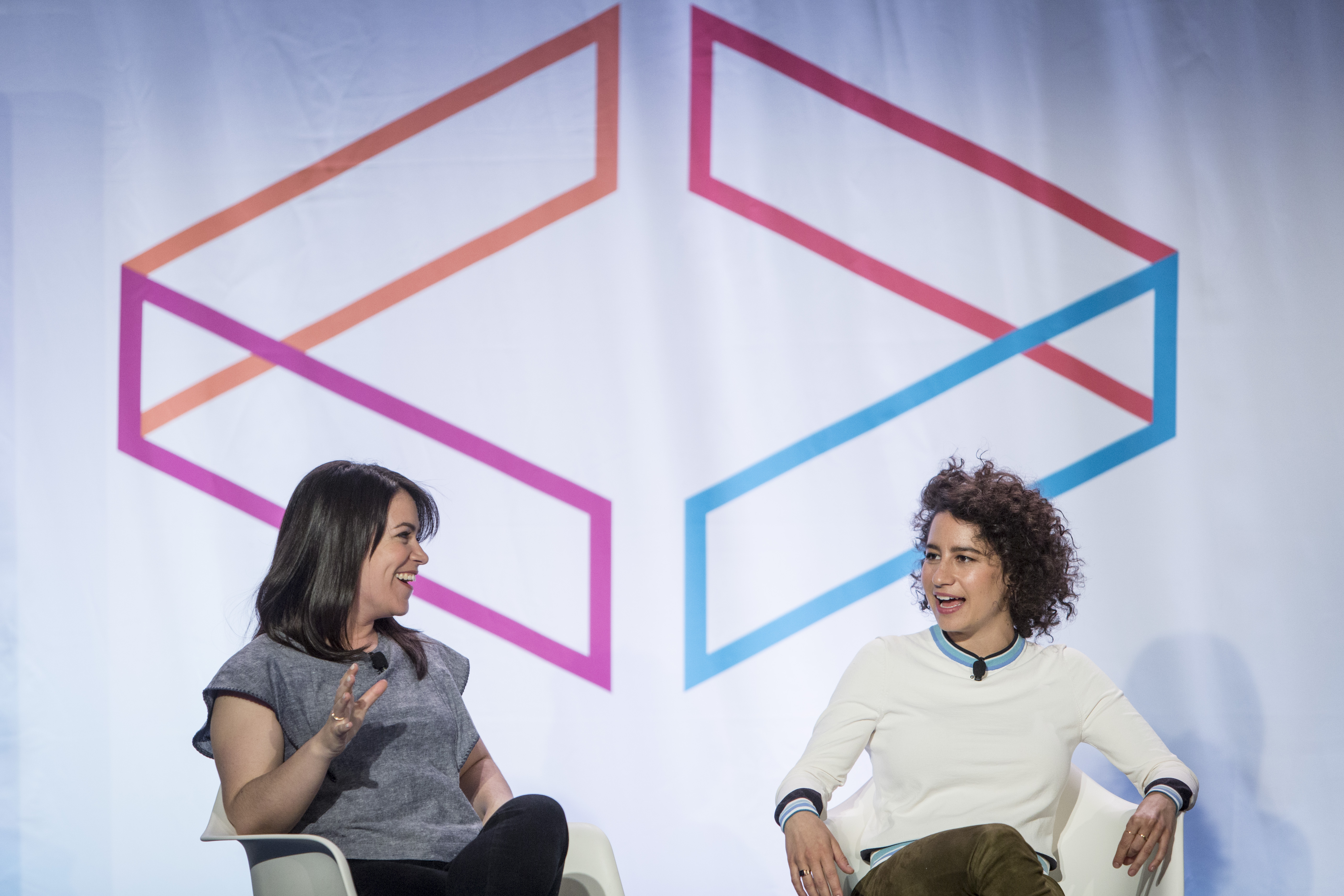
Jacobson and Glazer at Internet Week in 2015

In 2009, along with co-creator Abbi Jacobson, Glazer began shooting Broad City, a web series starring the two as fictionalized versions of themselves. The series was nominated for an ECNY Award for 'Best Web Series' and was positively received, garnering attention from major media outlets such as Entertainment Weekly, USA Today, and The Wall Street Journal. The series, which ran from 2009 to 2011, caught the attention of Amy Poehler, who subsequently met with Glazer and Jacobson to help them shop a pilot script based on the series. Poehler also agreed to star in the web series finale. In 2011, cable network FX, working with Poehler as the producer, purchased a script commitment for the series from Glazer and Jacobson. However, the network did not approve the script and decided not to proceed with development. Glazer and Jacobson then approached Comedy Central, who agreed to purchase the script from FX and order a pilot.

Broad City made its broadcast television premiere in January 2014 and was received with positive reviews and strong ratings, becoming Comedy Central's highest-rated first season since 2012 among the younger demographics, including adults 18–34, with an average of 1.2 million viewers. The show has received critical acclaim from fans and critics alike. Review aggregation website Metacritic noted season 1 received "generally favorable reviews," giving it a score of 75 out of 100, based on reviews from 14 critics. In February 2014, Comedy Central renewed the show for a second season. Season 2 received positive reviews, with Metacritic giving it a score of 89 out of 100, based on reviews from eight critics. In January 2015, the series was renewed for a third season, which premiered on February 17, 2016. In January 2016, the series was renewed for a fourth and a final fifth season, which premiered on January 24, 2019.

During this time Glazer also acted in various film and television projects. From 2012 to 2014, Glazer co-created the web series Chronic Gamer Girl with Alex Charak. Glazer starred in the 2013 independent feature film How to Follow Strangers. The film won top prize at the Lower East Side Film Festival. They appear in the 2015 film The Night Before. Glazer starred alongside Scarlett Johansson and Kate McKinnon in the 2017 comedy Rough Night.

=== 2020–present: Professional expansion ===
Glazer's debut stand-up special The Planet Is Burning premiered on Amazon Prime in January 2020. It was directed by Ryan Cunningham and Glazer served as an executive producer. Their second stand-up special Human Magic priemered on Hulu in December 2024. Glazer co-wrote, produced, and starred in the horror film False Positive, released on Hulu on June 25, 2021. In 2024, they co-wrote and starred in the movie Babes.

In 2022, Glazer was in the main cast of the Apple TV+ mystery comedy series The Afterparty.

In 2024 Glazer released their second standup special entitled Ilana Glazer: Human Magic for Hulu. Tara Ariano of Cracked praised the special noting "how much parenthood has coincided with a notable sharpening of their comic focus" and that "Glazer’s parenthood has given them something to say that’s worth listening to". In March 2025, Glazer made their acting Broadway debut, taking a supporting role in the play Good Night, and Good Luck written and starring George Clooney, adapted from his 2005 film of the same name. In the play, Glazer portrays Shirley Wershba, a reporter and editor for CBS News, who had to hide her marriage to Joseph Wershba from the network. Patrick Ryan of USA Today praised their performance, describing her as "incandescent as the razor-sharp Shirley Wershba, whose hush-hush office romance brings a welcome dose of tenderness" within the dramatic play.

== Activism ==
Glazer founded the campaign platform Generator Collective in 2016 with Glennis Meagher. The platform promotes female election candidates and general participation in democracy and political discussion.

Glazer is a signatory of the Film Workers for Palestine boycott pledge that was published in September 2025.

== Personal life ==
=== Identity ===
Glazer was once roommates with comedian Rachel Bloom after college in Brooklyn. Glazer is queer and has credited their work on Broad City with helping them understand their sexuality. Glazer is also nonbinary, an identity they realized while they were pregnant: "For the first time, my femininity didn't feel like drag or a joke or a role, but a powerful, open space. And my masculinity was also something I didn't need to make a joke out of. It was something that I thought was cool and hot and a part of me. That was an interesting aspect of being a queer, birthing person."

=== Marriage and family ===
In February 2017, Glazer married their longtime boyfriend, computational biologist David Rooklin, in a private ceremony. On March 17, 2021, Glazer announced on social media and in a magazine photo shoot that they and Rooklin were expecting a child together. Their child, a daughter, was born in July 2021.

== Filmography ==
=== Film ===
Year	Title	Role	Notes
2012	Nature Boys	Elle	Short film
2013	Little Horribles	Lindsay	Short film
2013	How to Follow Strangers	Ellie	
2014	High and Dry	Vet Assistant	Short film
2015	The Night Before	Rebecca Grinch	
2017	Rough Night	Frankie	
2021	False Positive	Lucia "Lucy" Martin	Also writer and producer
2022	Sell/Buy/Date	Themself	Documentary
2024	Babes	Eden	Also writer and producer
2026	Focker-in-Law	—N/a	Story
TBA	Rest and Relaxation	—N/a	Executive producer only

=== Television ===
Year	Title	Role	Notes
2010	Broad City	Ilana Wexler	Web series; also creator, 15 episodes
2012	Tosh.0	Alison	Uncredited; episode: "Parkour Girl"
2013	CollegeHumor	Unknown	Episode: "All-Nighter: Rap Intro"
2014–2019	Broad City	Ilana Wexler	Lead role; also creator, writer, director, executive producer 50 episodes
2015	Lucas Bros Moving Co	Sister Sister	Voice; episode: "Sister Sister Sister"
2015	Inside Amy Schumer	Themself	Episode: "80s Ladies"
2015	Lip Sync Battle	Themself	Episode: "Ilana Glazer vs. Abbi Jacobson"
2015–2020	BoJack Horseman	Penny Carson	Voice; 3 episodes
2016	Time Traveling Bong	Sharee	Lead role; miniseries
2016	Brad Neely's Harg Nallin' Sclopio Peepio	Various	Regular
2018	Sesame Street	Ms. Noodle	2 episodes
2018	RuPaul's Drag Race	Themself, guest judge	Episode: "Breastworld"
2019–2022	Green Eggs and Ham	EB	Voice; main cast
2022	The Afterparty	Chelsea	Main cast; 7 episodes
2022	Ziwe	Themself	Episode: "Hot!"
2024	Dinner Time Live with David Chang	Themself, guest	Episode: "Pumpkin Spice"
2026	Survival of the Thickest	Zadie	Episode: "Make It Work, Bitch."

=== Theater ===
Year	Title	Role	Notes	Venue	Ref.
2022	A Strange Loop	—N/a	Producer only	Lyceum Theatre, Broadway	
2025	Good Night, and Good Luck	Shirley Wershba	Acting debut	Winter Garden Theater, Broadway	

=== Standup specials ===
Year	Title	Studio	Ref.
2020	Ilana Glazer: The Planet is Burning	Prime Video	
2025	Ilana Glazer: Human Magic	Hulu	

== Awards and nominations ==
Association	Year	Category	Work	Result	Ref(s)
Critics' Choice Television Awards	2014	Best Actress in a Comedy Series	Broad City	Nominated	
Critics' Choice Television Awards	2015	Best Actress in a Comedy Series	Broad City	Nominated	
Daytime Emmy Awards	2023	Outstanding Daytime Special (as a host)	Recipe for Change: Standing Up to Anti-Semitism	Won	
MTV Movie & TV Awards	2017	Best Comedic Performance (with Abbi Jacobson)	Broad City	Nominated	
Primetime Emmy Awards	2016	Outstanding Short Form Comedy or Drama Series	Hack Into Broad City	Nominated	
Primetime Emmy Awards	2017	Outstanding Short Form Comedy or Drama Series	Hack Into Broad City	Nominated	
Primetime Emmy Awards	2019	Outstanding Short Form Comedy or Drama Series	Hack Into Broad City	Nominated	
Primetime Emmy Awards	2019	Outstanding Actress in a Short Form Comedy or Drama Series	Hack Into Broad City	Nominated	
Tony Awards	2022	Best Musical	A Strange Loop	Won	
Writers Guild of America Awards	2016	Best Comedy Series	Broad City	Nominated	
