= New Year's Eve (Up All Night) =

- Up All Night episode
- Episode no.: Season 1 Episode 12
- Directed by: Beth McCarthy-Miller
- Written by: Erica Rivinoja
- Production code: 112
- Original air date: January 12, 2012

Guest appearance
- Jason Lee

Episode chronology
← Previous "First Christmas"	Next → "Rivals"

"New Year's Eve" is the twelfth episode of the first season of the American comedy television series Up All Night. The episode originally aired on NBC in the United States on January 12, 2012. It was written by Erica Rivinoja and was directed by Beth McCarthy-Miller. The episode also featured a guest appearance from Jason Lee as Chris and Reagan's neighbor and Ava's boyfriend, Kevin.

During Reagan (Christina Applegate) and Chris's (Will Arnett) first New Year's Eve game night, Reagan's competitiveness comes out causing Chris to become embarrassed. Meanwhile, Missy (Jennifer Hall) brings an unexpected date along to the party and, Kevin (Jason Lee) starts to feel as though Ava (Maya Rudolph) may be ashamed of him.

"New Year's Eve" received mostly positive reviews from critics. According to the Nielsen Media Research, "New Year's Eve" drew 4.28 million viewers and received a 2.0 rating/5% share in the 18–49 demographic, marking a 5% rise in the ratings from the previous episode, "First Christmas". It ranked third in its timeslot and was the second highest-rated NBC program of the night after The Office.

== Plot ==
After not being able to find a baby-sitter for Amy, Reagan suggests that the two throw a game night, an idea Chris doesn't react well to. They invite Ava, Kevin, Missy, but Chris attempts to hide the games due to Reagan's competitive nature. He tries to make her promise that she won't be too competitive, but she does which makes the party awkward. While playing Rock Band the two get in a fight when Chris loses the beat on the drums because he was looking at his "drumming arm". Reagan decide to a make a list of "Things We Are Going to Stop Doing That Embarrass Each Other in 2012", which features annoying habits that the two want each other to give up. However, before 2011 comes to an end the two erase every thing from the list except for Chris's Borat impression and Reagen's competitive nature.

Meanwhile, Ava is asked to be the grand marshal to a New Year's Day parade. This makes her boyfriend, Kevin, feel like he can't live up to her lifestyle. He then starts thinking she may be ashamed of him, especially after he isn't invited to sit with her during the parade. Eventually, Kevin confronts Ava on this and she reveals that if she messes up their relationship she doesn't wanted to be reminded of it while Googling her name. He assures her that their relationship won't end badly and the two go to the parade.

== Production ==
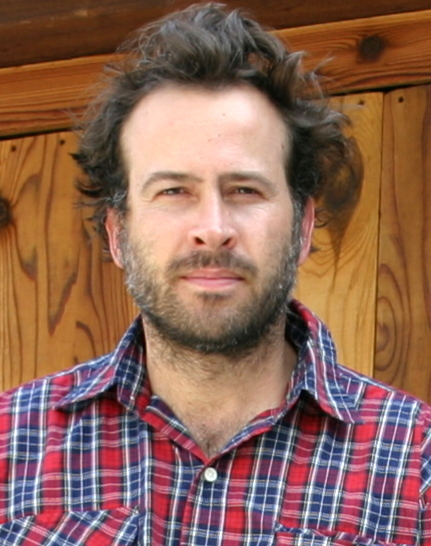
This episode marks Jason Lee's fourth appearance in the series

"New Year's Eve" was written by supervising producer Erica Rivinoja, marking her third writing credit for the series after "Mr. Bob's Toddler Kaleidoscope" and "Parents". The episode was directed by Beth McCarthy-Miller, who previously worked with creator Emily Spivey and executive producer Lorne Michaels on Saturday Night Live as director for 11 years. The episode features a guest appearance from Jason Lee as Kevin, Ava's boyfriend. He first appeared in the eighth episode, "First Night Away" and is currently set to appear in a recurring role for the series. Lee had previously worked with Spivey and Michaels after hosting an episode of Saturday Night Live on November 12, 2005. This is the first time the series aired in the 9:30 pm timeslot for the first season after The Office; the series previously aired in the 8:00pm timeslot on Wednesday. The series switched timeslots with another NBC comedy series, Whitney. Some media critics have said that the goal for moving the series was in order to make it more of a ratings success, like The Office.

== Reception ==
=== Ratings ===
"New Year's Eve" originally aired on NBC in the United States on January 12, 2012. The episode was viewed by an estimated 4.24 million viewers and received a 2.0 rating/5% share among adults between the ages of 18 and 49. This means that it was seen by 2.0% of all 18- to 49-year-olds, and 5% of all 18- to 49-year-olds watching television at the time of the broadcast. This marked a 5% rise in the ratings from the previous episode, "First Christmas". The episode finished third in its time slot along with The Office, being beaten by Grey's Anatomy which received a 3.8 rating/9% share and the CBS drama Person of Interest which received a 3.2 rating/8% share in the 18–49 demographic. The episode, however, did manage to beat the Fox drama series The Finder and the CW drama series The Secret Circle. Added with DVR viewers, who viewed the episode within seven days of the original broadcast, the episode received a 3.0 rating in the 18–49 demographic, adding a 1.0 rating to the original viewership.

=== Critical reviews ===
"New Year's Eve" received several positive reviews from critics. New York writer Steven Heisler praised the episode for avoiding "sitcom-y territory" with the emotional ending. He also called the series a better choice to follow The Office then Whitney. The A.V. Club reviewer Margaret Eby complemented the believability of the main Reagen-Chris plot. Despite this, she criticized the Ava-Kevin subplot comparing it to a storyline from Sex and The City. She also noted the plotline didn't stay true to the characters following their plotline in the previous episode, "First Christmas". She ultimately rated the episode with a B. Adam Victavage of Paste called the episode a perfect transition from the previous episodes and allowed Ava to be "a loveable third wheel to a completely strong duo in Chris and Reagan". He also reacted positively for the scenes featuring Missy, comparing her scenes to "early Ava, but less obnoxious". He ultimately gave the episode an 8.7/10 calling it "commendable". Bradford Evans of SplitSider praised Jennifer Hall's performance calling her the "unsung hero" of the series. He also reacted positively towards the episode's ability to unify the show and "keep all of the characters on the same turf". He concluded that he hoped the series could make itself a vital part of the network's lineup. HitFix reviewer Alan Sepinwall called the episode "one its [the series] strongest episodes to date". He wrote that the addition of Jason Lee humanized Ava more and gave her a more natural reason to visit Reagan and Chris at home. He also wrote that the episode worked on a "character level".
