= Preschool Auction =

- Up All Night episode
- Episode no.: Season 1 Episode 14
- Directed by: Beth McCarthy-Miller
- Written by: Brian Rowe
- Production code: 114
- Original air date: February 2, 2012

Guest appearance
- Dean Winters

Episode chronology
← Previous "Rivals"	Next → "Day After Valentine's Day"

"Preschool Auction" is the fourteenth episode of the first season of the American comedy television series Up All Night. The episode aired on NBC in the United States on February 2, 2012.

== Plot ==
In an attempt to secure a spot for Amy at a prestigious preschool, Reagan volunteers to run the school's annual fundraiser, and asks Ava to help with the charity auction. Meanwhile, Chris reverts to his old competitive ways when his brother (Dean Winters) comes to visit.

== Production ==
"Preschool Auction" was written by Brian Rowe, his second writing credit for the series after "Week Off". The episode was also directed by Beth McCarthy-Miller, her second credit for the series after "New Year's Eve". She previously worked with creator Emily Spivey and executive producer Lorne Michaels on Saturday Night Live as director for 11 years. The episode features a guest appearance from Dean Winters as Chris's brother, Casey. His appearance was initially reported by TV Guide writer William Keck. Winters previously worked with executive producer Michaels on the NBC comedy series 30 Rock as a recurring character.

== Reception ==
=== Ratings ===
"Preschool Auction" originally aired on NBC in the United States on February 2, 2012. The episode was viewed by an estimated 3.70 million viewers and received a 1.8 rating/5% share among adults between the ages of 18 and 49. This means that it was seen by 1.8% of all 18- to 49-year-olds, and 5% of all 18- to 49-year-olds watching television at the time of the broadcast. This marked a 5 percent drop in the ratings from the previous episode, "Rivals". The episode finished fourth in its time slot, being beaten by Grey's Anatomy which received a 3.6 rating/9% share in the 18–49 demographic, the CBS drama Person of Interest which received a 3.3 rating/9% share and the Fox drama series The Finder which received a 2.4 rating/6% share. The episode, however, did manage to beat the CW drama series The Secret Circle. Added with DVR viewers, who viewed the episode within seven days of the original broadcast, the episode received a 2.8 rating in the 18–49 demographic, adding a 1.0 rating to the original viewership.

=== Reviews ===
"Preschool Auction" received positive reviews from critics. Adam Victavage of Paste reacted very positively towards the episode and compared Ava, Missy and Reagen to the female leads of Friends and 30 Rock character Liz Lemon calling the three "fresh additions to sitcom lineage". He called Winter's appearance "pleasant" and compared his character to Arnett's character on the series Arrested Development, GOB Bluth. He concluded that if the series was to continue its rise in quality, it could possibly receive award consideration "next time around". He ultimately gave the episode an 8.8/10 calling it "commendable". The A.V. Club reviewer Margaret Eby wrote that the episode restored her "faith" in the series following its move behind The Office and the two "lackluster" episodes. She also noted that the episode was both "funny and sweet" and was able to have a good balance between the two. She later on praised Winter's guest appearance and she called the Casey-Chris plot "fresh and sharp". She ultimately gave the episode an A.
