= First Christmas =

- Up All Night episode
- Episode no.: Season 1 Episode 11
- Directed by: Troy Miller
- Written by: Tucker Cawley
- Production code: 111
- Original air date: December 7, 2011

Guest appearances
- Blythe Danner; Jason Lee

Episode chronology
← Previous "Week Off"	Next → "New Year's Eve"

"First Christmas" is the eleventh episode of the first season of the American television comedy series Up All Night. The episode originally aired on NBC in the United States on December 7, 2011. It was written by Tucker Cawley and was directed by Troy Miller, marking the latter's second credit for the series. The episode also featured the return appearance of Blythe Danner and Jason Lee.

"First Christmas" has received mixed reviews from critics since its airing. According to Nielsen Media Research, the series rose in the ratings from the previous episode, "Week Off". The episode also ranked as the second-highest-rated NBC series of the original night it aired, behind Law and Order: Special Victims Unit.

== Plot ==
Reagan (Christina Applegate) tries to make Amy's first Christmas perfect, with help from her mom (Blythe Danner). In an effort to find Reagan the perfect gift, Chris (Will Arnett) goes to the mall. Meanwhile, Ava (Maya Rudolph) fears for her relationship when Kevin (Jason Lee) decides to spend Christmas with his ex-wife.

== Production ==
"First Christmas" was written by Tucker Cawley, his first writing credit for the series. The episode was directed by Troy Miller, his second credit for the series after directing the fifth episode, "Mr. Bob's Toddler Kaleidoscope". The episode features a guest appearance from Blythe Danner, who plays Reagan's mom. She had previously appeared in the episode "Parents". The episode also features Jason Lee as Kevin, Ava's boyfriend. He is currently set to appear in a recurring role for the series. Lee had previously worked with creator Emily Spivey and executive producer Lorne Michaels after hosting an episode of Saturday Night Live. This is the final time the series aired in the 8:00 pm timeslot for the first season; it will air after The Office on Thursday at 9:30 pm beginning in January 2012. Some media critics have said that the goal for moving the series was in order to make it more of a ratings success, like The Office.

== Reception ==
=== Ratings ===
"First Christmas" originally aired on NBC in the United States on December 7, 2011. The episode was viewed by an estimated 4.95 million viewers and received a 1.9 rating/6% share among adults between the ages of 18 and 49. This means that it was seen by 1.9% of all 18- to 49-year-olds, and 6% of all 18- to 49-year-olds watching television at the time of the broadcast. This marked a 20% percent rise in the 18-49 demo from the previous episode, "Week Off" which aired as a special, while it only rose slightly from the previous regular episode, "Hiring and Firing". The episode ranked fourth in its timeslot and was able to beat only a rerun of The CW reality series, America's Next Top Model which received a 0.5 rating/1% share in the 18–49 demographic. Up All Night became the second highest-rated program on NBC that night, finishing with a higher rating than a rerun of this series and Harry's Law, but a lower rating than Law & Order: Special Victims Unit.

=== Reviews ===
Since airing, the episode has received mixed reviews from critics. The A.V. Club reviewer Erik Adams wrote that the episode felt like a pilot for new viewers and also wrote that it proved the series had found its footing. Despite this, he also noted that previous episodes worked better as an introduction to the series for new viewers. He called the Reagan plot the best executed plot of the episode while he called the Chris plot sloppily made compared to previous similar plots of the series. He ultimately gave the episode a C+. Paste writer Adam Victavage complimented the writers for being able to use a sitcom staple and make it seem original and "semi-realistic" and called it one of the few believable NBC comedies. He also complimented the "pleasant twist" to the Ava-Kevin subplot which featured Ava spying on Kevin. He ultimately gave the episode a 7.9/10, calling the episode "commendable".
