= New Car =

A new car is an automobile that is sold in its original manufactured condition, usually by a retail business known as a car dealership. The term is contrasted with used car, an automobile which has previously had one or more owners.

New Car may also refer to:

- New Car (Up All Night), 2011 episode of American TV comedy series Up All Night
- New Car (The Americans), 2014 episode of American TV drama series The Americans
- The New Car, a 1931 film

== See also ==
- The New Cars
