= New Car (Up All Night) =

- Up All Night episode
- Episode no.: Season 1 Episode 4
- Directed by: James Griffiths
- Written by: Emily Spivey
- Production code: 103
- Original air date: October 5, 2011

Episode chronology
← Previous "Working Late and Working It"	Next → "Mr. Bob's Toddler Kaleidoscope"

"New Car" is the fourth episode of the American television comedy series, Up All Night. The episode originally aired on October 5, 2011 on NBC. The episode was written by series creator and executive producer Emily Spivey and was directed by James Griffiths.

In the episode, Chris and Reagan go online shopping to try to find a potential family car. Meanwhile, Ava attempts to take on more serious talk show topics, however, she finds the amount of preparation it takes, way too overwhelming.

"New Car" received mixed reviews.

== Plot ==
Chris and Reagan are going to the beach, but Chris's car is in the shop and they have to take Reagan's E36 BMW Convertible. They both decided that they should get an SUV. The next night, Chris and Reagan look up SUV's but then get distracted and drunk, the stumbled upon an old van and sometime in the night a drunken Reagan bids on it. The next morning, a man knocks on the door, Chris opens it. The man gives him the keys to the van. Reagan soon walks behind Chris and soon they end up getting a tour of the van.

Chris and Reagan go online shopping to try to find a potential family car. Meanwhile, Ava attempts to take on more serious talk show topics, however, she finds the amount of preparation it takes, way too overwhelming.

== Production ==
"New Car" was written by series creator and executive producer Emily Spivey and was directed by James Griffiths. This marked both their second credit for the series after "Pilot".

== Reception ==
=== Ratings ===
In its original American broadcast, "New Car" was viewed by an estimated 5.60 million viewers and received a 2.3 rating/7% share among adults between the ages of 18 and 49. This means that it was seen by 2.3%, of all 18- to 49-year-olds, and 7% of all 18- to 49-year-olds watching television at the time of the broadcast. This marked a slight rise in the ratings from the previous episode, "Working Late and Working It". It ranked as the highest rated NBC series on Wednesday.

=== Reviews ===
"New Car" received mixed reviews from critics. Alan Sepinwall of HitFix wrote that "this was the first episode where I think I preferred the Maya Rudolph version of the show to the Christina Applegate/Will Arnett version". He also complemented Nick Cannon's short cameo, but criticized the main plot for being too cartoonish. He concluded his review with "this was the first episode of the show I mostly didn't enjoy".
