= Working Late and Working It =

- Up All Night episode
- Episode no.: Season 1 Episode 3
- Directed by: Joe Russo
- Written by: Tim McAuliffe
- Production code: 104
- Original air date: September 28, 2011

Guest appearances
- Will Forte as Reed; Jorma Taccone as Benjamin Roth

Episode chronology
← Previous "Cool Neighbors"	Next → "New Car"

"Working Late and Working It" is the third episode of the American television comedy series, Up All Night. The episode originally aired on September 28, 2011, on NBC. The episode was written by Tim McAuliffe and was directed by Joe Russo. It guest starred Will Forte as Chris' friend, Reed and Jorma Taccone as Ava's ex-boyfriend, B-Ro.

The episode revolves around Chris (Will Arnett) and Reagan (Christina Applegate) trying to bring the sexy back into their marriage with the help of Chris's new friend Reed (Will Forte). Meanwhile, Ava (Maya Rudolph) blames Reagan for the advice that led her to break up with her now engaged ex-boyfriend, B-Ro (Jorma Taccone).

"Working Late and Working It" received mostly positive reviews from critics. The episode was viewed by 5.34 million viewers and received a 2.1 rating/6% share in the 18–49 demographic, marking a slight drop in the ratings from the previous episode, "Cool Neighbors". Despite this, it tied as NBC's highest-rated show on Wednesday with Law & Order: Special Victims Unit.

== Plot ==
After noticing that Reagan has been wearing more sweats after the baby, Chris seeks advice from his new friend, Reed (Will Forte). Reed tells him that he needs to dress more sexy in order for Reagan to dress sexy. He does and he tries to hint it at her which causes her to grow angry and go to bed. In the morning, she dresses "fancy" just like his request. Ava eventually convinces Reagan to forgive Chris, because he's "one of the good ones". At home, Reagan comes back from work Chris shows her a poem/slide-show he made featuring them with the Obama family albeit, with Photoshop. After the slideshow, Reagan decides to change into something "more comfortable" wearing a thong that Ava gave to her.

Meanwhile, Ava deals with her ex-boyfriend B-Ro.

== Production ==
"Working Late and Working It" was written by Tim McAuliffe and was directed by Joe Russo, both their first credit for the series. On August 26, 2011, Josef Adalian of New York reported that Will Forte would appear on Up All Night as Reed. Forte has previously worked with executive producer Lorne Michaels and co-creator Emily Spivey on Saturday Night Live. He had also guest starred in several episodes of 30 Rock which is produced by Michael's production company, Broadway Video, which also producers Up All Night. On September 1, 2011, Jorma Taccone was reported to guest star on the series as Ava's ex-boyfriend, B-Ro by Rick Porter of Zap2it. He had also previously worked with Michaels and Spivey on SNL.

== Reception ==
=== Ratings ===
In its original American broadcast, "Working Late and Working It" was viewed 5.34 million viewers and received a 2.1 rating/6% share among adults between the ages of 18 and 49. This means that it was seen by 2.1% of all 18- to 49-year-olds, and 6% of all 18- to 49-year-olds watching television at the time of the broadcast. This marked a 13 percent drop in the ratings from the previous episode, "Cool Neighbors". The episode ranked fourth in its timeslot and was only able to beat the short-lived CW reality series H8R which received a 0.6 rating/2% share in the 18–49 demographic. Up All Night tied for the highest-rated program on NBC that night, finishing with a higher rating than the short-lived Free Agents and Harry's Law and tied withLaw & Order: Special Victims Unit. Added with DVR viewers, who viewed the episode within seven days of the original broadcast, the episode received a 3.1 rating in the 18–49 demographic, adding a 0.9 rating to the original viewership.

=== Reviews ===
"Working Late and Working It" received generally positive reviews. The A.V. Club reviewer Erik Adams praised Will Arnett's performance in the episode saying that "Chris Brinkley might be the first Arnett character who appeals to people" since Arrested Development. She also complemented Ava's humanity in the episode calling it a "step up from the first two episodes". Despite this, she criticized the "Basically" music video comparing it to "a low-rent take on The Lonely Island’s SNL Digital Shorts" and also stated that "the more the leads come into their characters, the less Up All Night should have to lean on “Hey, remember the other things these people have done?” gags like the “Basically” video (or any time Ava sings, really)". He ultimately gave the episode a B. Paste writer Adam Vitcavage was more negative writing that "While Chris and Reagan supplied a heart-warming storyline with its fair share of laughs, it was not up to par with the first two episodes". She also said the Ava subplot "though boring, had some great moments that made me laugh harder than the rest of the episode". He ultimately gave the episode an 8.0/10 calling the episode "commendable".
