= Amy Poehler =

American actress, comedian and writer (born 1971)

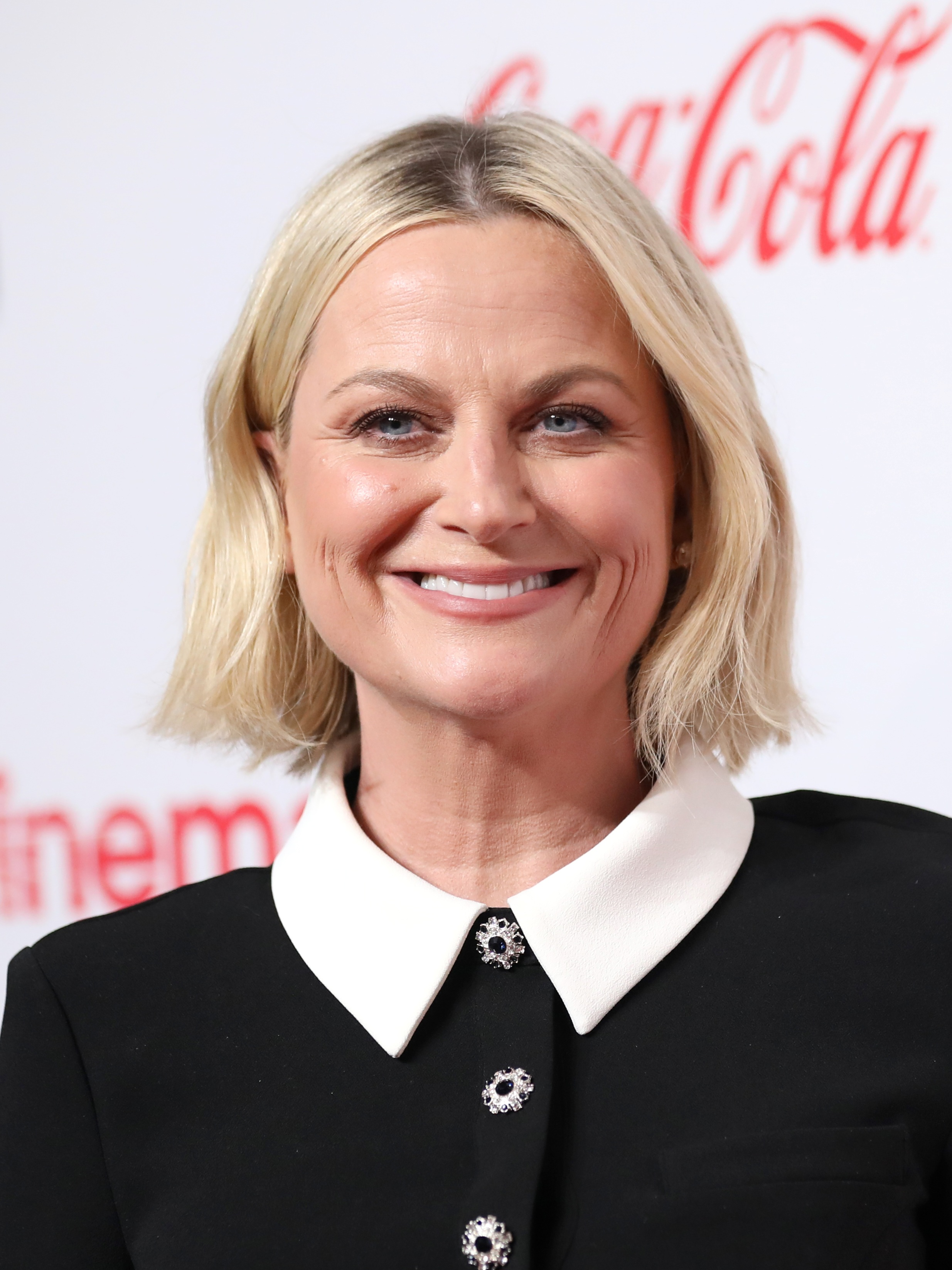
- Poehler in 2024
- Born: Amy Meredith Poehler; September 16, 1971 (age 55); Newton, Massachusetts, U.S.
- Education: Boston College (BA)
- Occupations: Actress; comedian; writer; producer; podcaster; director
- Years active: 1995–present
- Works: Full list
- Spouse: Will Arnett (m. 2003; div. 2016)
- Children: 2
- Relatives: Greg Poehler (brother)
- Awards: Full list

Comedy career
- Medium: Television; film; theatre; books
- Genres: Improvisational comedy; blue comedy; sketch comedy; insult comedy; surreal humor; satire
- Subjects: American culture; current events; human interaction; social awkwardness; self-deprecation; pop culture; American politics

Amy Meredith Poehler (/ˈpoʊlər/ POH-lər; born September 16, 1971) is an American actress, comedian, writer and podcaster. Known for her acclaimed roles in sketch comedy, sitcoms and comedy films, she has earned accolades including a Primetime Emmy Award from 26 nominations, two Golden Globe Awards, and a Peabody Award, as well as a nomination for a Grammy Award. Poehler was included on Time's list of the 100 most influential people in the world in 2011 and received a star on the Hollywood Walk of Fame for her contributions to comedy in 2015.

Poehler started her career in improvisational theatre at Chicago's Second City and ImprovOlympic in the early 1990s, and with the Upright Citizens Brigade in 1995. The group moved to New York City in 1996, where their act became a half-hour sketch-comedy series on Comedy Central in 1998. Along with other members of the comedy group, Poehler is a founder of the Upright Citizens Brigade Theatre. In 2001, Poehler joined the NBC sketch comedy show Saturday Night Live as a cast member, where she also served as a Weekend Update co-anchor starting from 2004 to 2008. She went on to produce and star as Leslie Knope in the sitcom Parks and Recreation (2009–2015) for which she won a Golden Globe Award, and co-created the animated series The Mighty B! (2008-2010) for Nickelodeon.

She frequently collaborated with Tina Fey on SNL and later acted with her in the feature films Mean Girls (2004), Baby Mama (2008), Sisters (2015), and Wine Country (2019). Together they co-hosted the Golden Globe Awards four times in the years 2013, 2014, 2015, and 2021, as well as SNL, the latter of which earned them the 2016 Primetime Emmy Award. Poehler served as an executive producer on the television series Welcome to Sweden, Broad City, Difficult People, Duncanville, Three Busy Debras, and Russian Doll. Poehler also voiced roles for the animated films Shrek the Third (2007), Horton Hears a Who! (2008), Monsters vs. Aliens (2009), and the Inside Out franchise (2015–present).

Poehler wrote the comedic book Yes Please (2014) and was nominated for the Grammy Award for Best Spoken Word Album. In 2025, she started the podcast Good Hang with Amy Poehler, for which she won the first Golden Globe Award for Best Podcast. She is also known for championing causes that advance worker's rights and women's rights.

== Early life, family and education ==
Poehler was born on September 16, 1971, in Newton, Massachusetts, a suburb of Boston. Her parents, Eileen and William Poehler, are school teachers. Poehler credits her father with encouraging her to break social protocols and take risks. She has one younger brother, Greg, who is a producer and actor. Poehler's ancestry is Irish, German, Portuguese, and English; her Irish roots originate from the counties Sligo and Cork. Her great-grandmother emigrated from Nova Scotia, Canada to Boston in the late 1800s. She was raised as a Catholic.

Poehler grew up in nearby Burlington, Massachusetts, which she describes as a blue-collar town. Her favorite performers and influences included sketch comedians Carol Burnett, Gilda Radner, and Catherine O'Hara. When she was ten years old, Poehler played Dorothy Gale in her school's production of L. Frank Baum's The Wizard of Oz. The experience inspired Poehler's love of performing. Poehler continued acting in school plays at Burlington High School. She also participated in other activities during her time in high school including student council, soccer, and softball.

After graduating from high school in 1989, she enrolled at Boston College. During college, Poehler became a member of the improv comedy troupe My Mother's Fleabag. She graduated from Boston College with a bachelor's degree in media and communications in 1993.

== Career ==
=== 1995–2000: Career beginnings in Improv comedy ===
Poehler's time studying improv in college inspired her to pursue comedy professionally. After graduating from college, she moved to Chicago, where she took her first improv class, taught by Charna Halpern at ImprovOlympic. Early on, Poehler worked as a waitress and at other jobs to earn money. Through ImprovOlympic, Poehler learned from Del Close, and she was introduced to friend and frequent collaborator Tina Fey. Poehler and Fey joined a Second City touring company at the same time, and Poehler went on to join one of Second City's main companies where Fey was her eventual replacement.

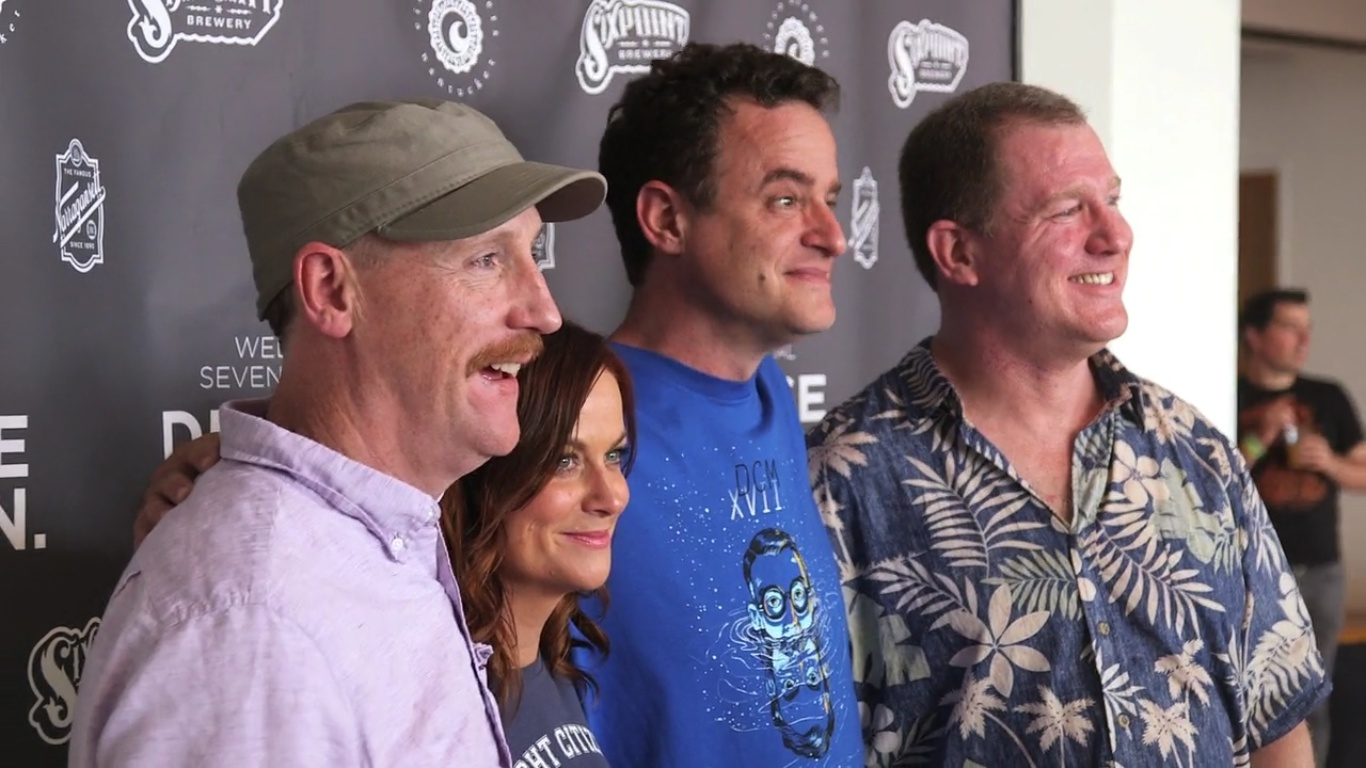
Matt Walsh, Amy Poehler, Matt Besser, and Ian Roberts at the Del Close Marathon in New York City in 2015

The Upright Citizens Brigade (UCB) formed as a sketch and improv group in Chicago in 1991. Early members included Horatio Sanz, Adam McKay, Ian Roberts, Neil Flynn, and Matt Besser, although the membership was not static. McKay left the fledgling group in 1995 and Poehler became his replacement. In 1996, a core group of four UCB members, Poehler, Besser, Roberts, and Matt Walsh, moved to New York City. The "UCB Four" began performing shows at small venues around the city which evolved into four regular live shows after a few months. To earn money outside of the shows, UCB taught improv classes. Poehler also started making appearances on Late Night with Conan O'Brien, often playing her recurring role as Andy Richter's younger sister, Stacy.

In 1998, Comedy Central debuted UCB's eponymous half-hour sketch-comedy series. During the show's second season, the group founded an improv theater/training center in New York City on West 22nd Street, occupying the space of a former strip club. The UCB Theatre held shows seven nights a week, in addition to offering classes in sketch-comedy writing and improv. In the summer of 2000, Comedy Central canceled the Upright Citizens Brigade program after its third season, although the UCB Theatre continued to operate. Poehler, Besser, Roberts, and Walsh are considered the founders of UCB and have been credited with popularizing long-form improv in New York. By 2011, UCB had two theaters in New York and a theater in Los Angeles with 8,000 students taking classes per year.

In 1999, Poehler and Tina Fey provided voices for the video game Deer Avenger 2: Deer in the City. In 2000, still unknown at the time, she appeared on the cover of the single "You Can Have It All" by American indie rock band Yo La Tengo. In 1999, Poehler had a small role in the film Deuce Bigalow: Male Gigolo. The following year, she was cast in the film Wet Hot American Summer. Wet Hot American Summer was the first film from David Wain, who cast Poehler based on her work with Upright Citizen's Brigade. The film, which cost only $1.8 million to make, was not a success initially when it was released in 2001. It gained a following after its release on DVD.

=== 2001–present: Saturday Night Live and film work ===
==== Cast member (2001–2008) ====
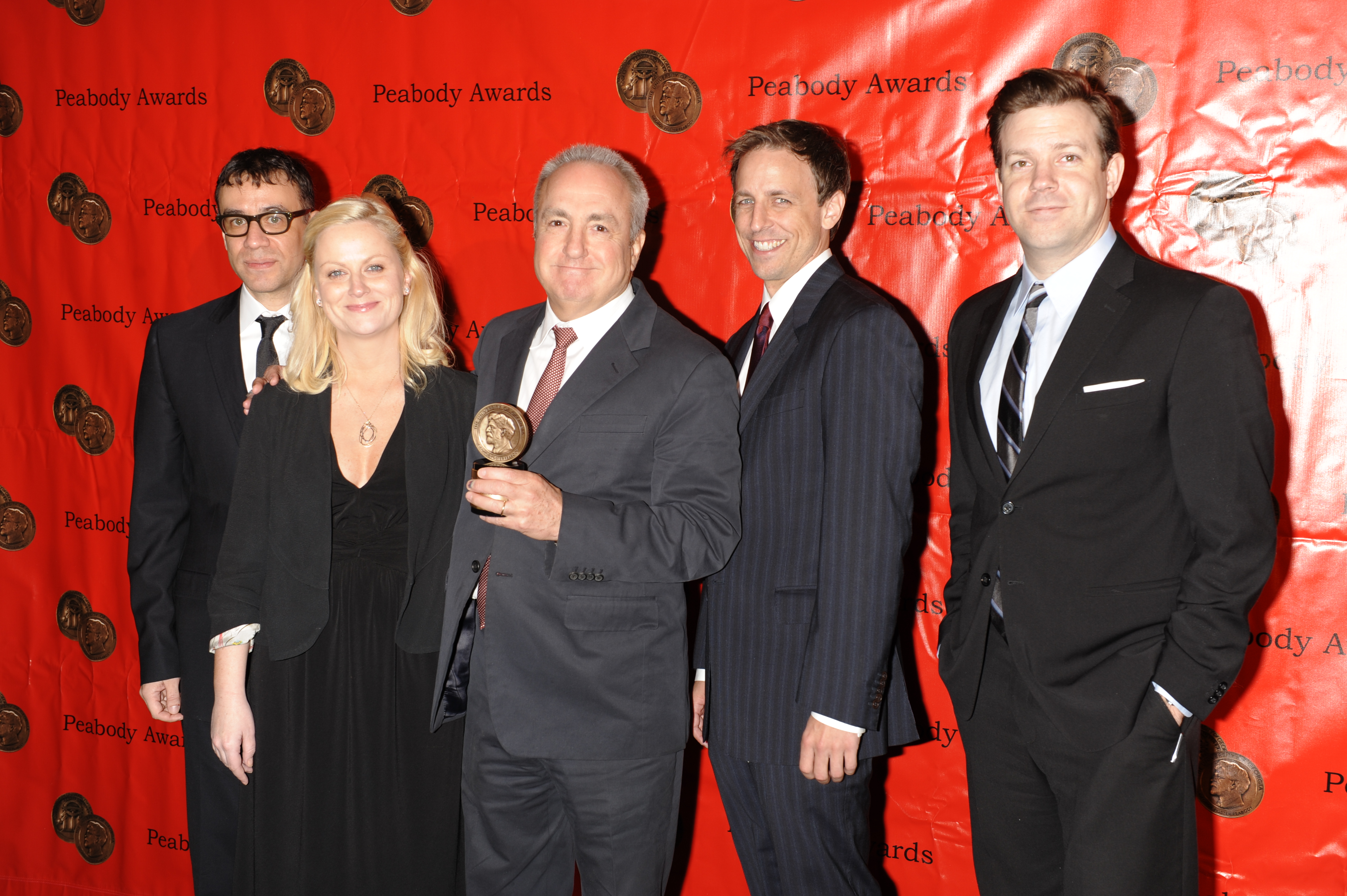
SNL colleagues Fred Armisen, Poehler, Lorne Michaels, Seth Meyers and Jason Sudeikis at the Peabody Awards in 2008.

Poehler joined the cast of Saturday Night Live (SNL) at the start of the 2001–2002 season, after Tina Fey had tried to recruit her for SNL for years. Poehler made her debut in the first episode produced after the 9/11 attacks. She was promoted from featured player to full cast member in her first season on the show, making her the third cast member, (Note: Harry Shearer and Eddie Murphy were the first two feature players promoted in their first seasons.) and first woman, to earn this distinction. Poehler's recurring characters included hyperactive ten-year old Kaitlyn, one-legged reality show contestant Amber, and Bronx Beat talk show co-host Betty Caruso. In addition to her original characters, Poehler performed a number of impressions, including Hillary Clinton, Dakota Fanning, Avril Lavigne, Michael Jackson, Kim Jong-Il, Nancy Grace, Kelly Ripa, Katie Couric, Sharon Stone, Sharon Osbourne, Julia Roberts, Britney Spears, Madonna, Paula Abdul, Dolly Parton, Dennis Kucinich, Ann Coulter, Pamela Anderson, Christian Siriano, Rosie Perez, Catherine Zeta-Jones, and Farrah Fawcett.

Beginning with the 2004–2005 season, she co-anchored Weekend Update with Tina Fey, replacing Jimmy Fallon. Fey and Poehler became the first team of female co-anchors of the longtime SNL staple. Poehler, Fey, and Maya Rudolph were among the show's biggest stars that season and contributed to a shift in the show to featuring more female-driven sketches. When Fey left after the 2005–2006 season to devote time to the sitcom she created, 30 Rock, Seth Meyers joined Poehler at the Weekend Update anchor desk. In 2008, Poehler was nominated for the Primetime Emmy Award for Outstanding Supporting Actress in a Comedy Series, the first year SNL cast members were eligible for the category.

The SNL premiere of the 2008–2009 season opened with Fey and Poehler as Sarah Palin and Hillary Clinton, respectively discussing sexism in political campaigning. The sketch, which Poehler co-wrote with Meyers, became the biggest viral video of the year. Days after the season premiere, NBC announced Poehler, pregnant with her first child, would not return after her upcoming maternity leave. On the October 25 episode, Meyers announced during Weekend Update that Poehler was in labor. At the end of Weekend Update, special guest Maya Rudolph and cast member Kenan Thompson sang a custom rendition of "Can't Take My Eyes Off You" for Poehler. Poehler had been rehearsing for that week's show until the day before the birth.

After giving birth, Poehler appeared during a pre-taped "SNL Presidential Bash '08" prime time special on November 3. Despite the prior announcement that Poehler would not return after her maternity leave, she came back for two more live episodes. During the December 13 Weekend Update Poehler announced that it was her last show. Saturday Night Live aired a special, "The Best of Amy Poehler", in April 2009. For the 2008–2009 season finale, Poehler returned to co-host Weekend Update and joined host Will Ferrell's version of the Billy Joel song "Goodnight Saigon".

Off camera, Poehler was a prolific writer. She often collaborated with writer Emily Spivey. Meyers described Poehler as "the most generous laugher" during sketch read-throughs. Poehler would also take it upon herself to welcome guest hosts during rehearsals and try to make them feel comfortable during their stint on SNL.

==== Guest appearances (2009–present) ====
Although she had already left SNL, Poehler joined Meyers in September 2009 for two episodes of Saturday Night Live Weekend Update Thursday, which aired in prime time and led directly into Parks and Recreation. She returned to SNL along with other past female cast members for a special Mother's Day episode on May 8, 2010, hosted by Betty White. Poehler returned again to host the 2010–2011 season premiere with musical guest Katy Perry. She participated in another SNL prime time special, The Women of SNL in November of that year. Poehler also returned sporadically for appearances on Weekend Update with Meyers, as well as in sketches when Jimmy Fallon (2011) and Maya Rudolph (2012) hosted.

In 2015, during the Saturday Night Live 40th Anniversary Special, she returned to anchor Weekend Update, this time with Fey and Jane Curtin. Later that year, Poehler co-hosted an episode of the show during season 41, alongside Fey. Poehler continued to make several guest appearances throughout the years, including the 50th Anniversary Special in 2025, and hosted the second episode of season 51 on October 11, 2025 (the exact 50th anniversary of the premiere of the show's first episode).

==== Film roles (2004–2008) ====
Poehler appeared in the 2004 movie Mean Girls, written by Tina Fey. Fey wrote the role of self-described "cool mom" with Poehler in mind; however, Fey and director Mark Waters had to push for Poehler's casting. The studio had been wary of casting too many SNL cast members and were concerned that Poehler was too young to play the mother of Rachel McAdams, who is only seven years younger than her. Poehler filmed the role in Toronto during the week while filming SNL. The movie grossed $129 million at the box office worldwide and saw its popularity continue to rise after its release on DVD.

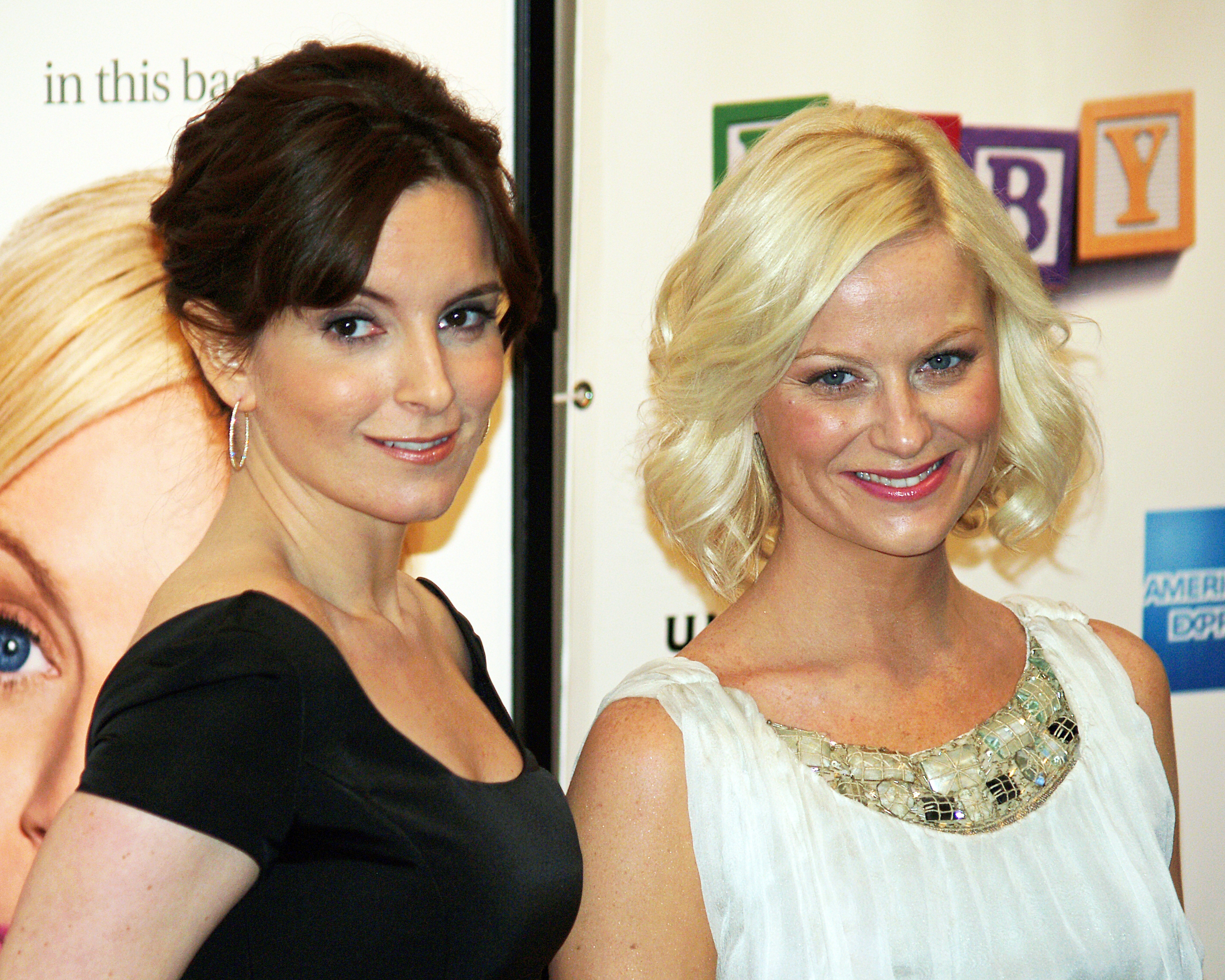
Tina Fey and Poehler at the premiere of Baby Mama in New York, April 2008

In 2008, she starred in Baby Mama, which reunited her with Tina Fey. Poehler plays trashy Angie Ostrowiski, who is hired by Fey's Kate to be her child's surrogate mother. The film opened on April 25, 2008, and was the number one movie at the box office in its opening weekend. The film went on to gross over $60 million at the U.S. box office. During this period she also acted in live-action films Envy (2004), Southland Tales (2006), Tenacious D in The Pick of Destiny (2006), Blades of Glory (2007), Mr. Woodcock (2007), Hamlet 2 (2008), Spring Breakdown (2009) as well as voice roles in films including Shrek the Third (2007), Horton Hears a Who! (2008), Alvin and the Chipmunks: The Squeakquel, and Monsters vs. Aliens (both 2009).

=== 2009–2021: Stardom and acclaim ===
==== Parks and Recreation and other work (2009–2015) ====
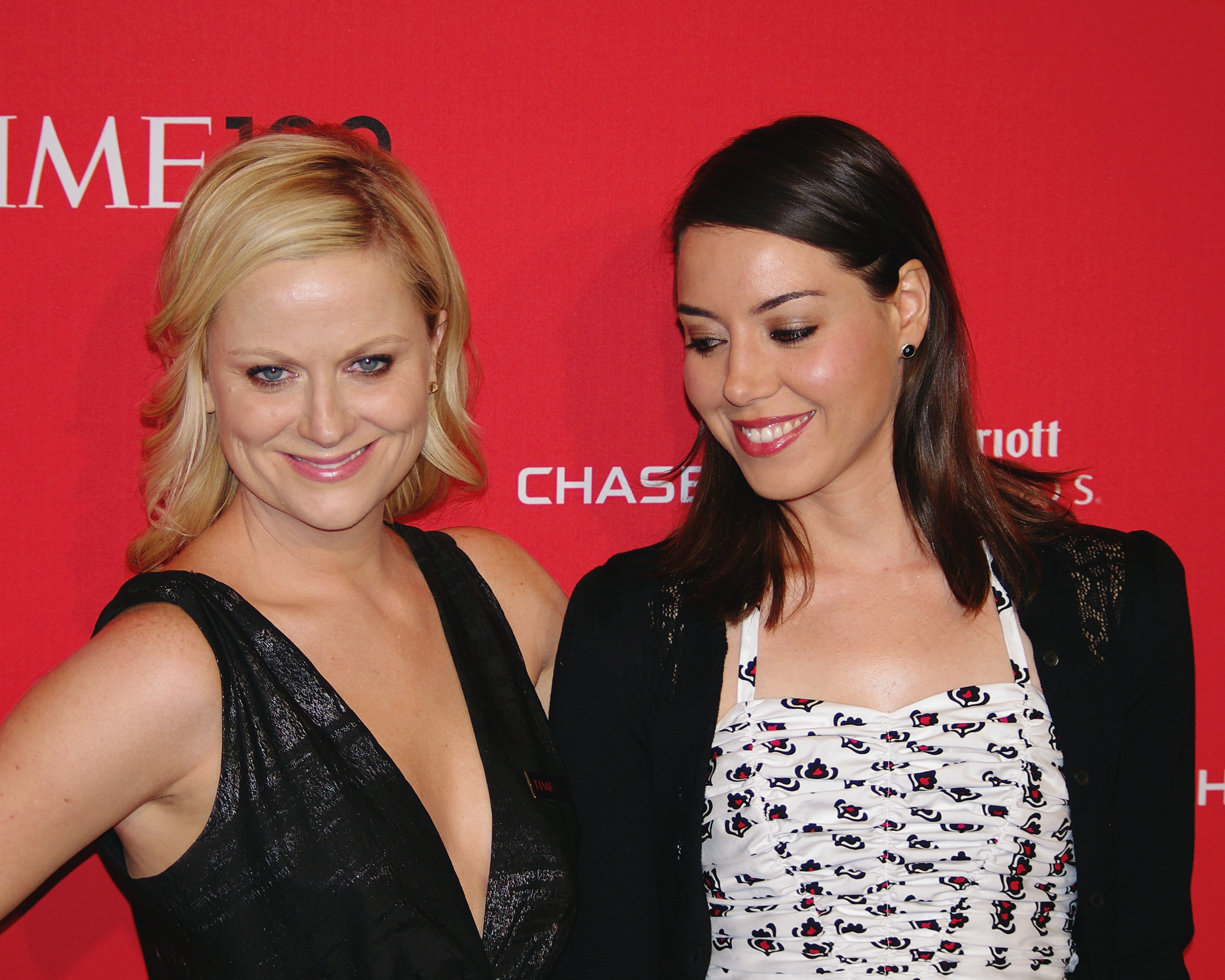
Poehler with Parks and Recreation co-star Aubrey Plaza at the 2012 Time 100 gala

Following the success of The Office, NBC ordered a new series from producers Greg Daniels and Michael Schur. In July 2008, Variety reported that Poehler was in final negotiations to star in the still untitled series from Daniels and Schur. Poehler and Schur were friends from their time together at SNL, where Schur worked as a writer. Signing Poehler, who was pregnant with her first child, meant the new series would have to forgo a promised post-Super Bowl debut and cut its first season short, but Daniels and Schur chose to push back the series for Poehler. On July 21, 2008, NBC announced Poehler's new series, Parks and Recreation, saying the project would not be a direct spin-off of The Office, as previously speculated.

Parks and Recreation premiered on NBC on April 9, 2009, at 8:30 pm between two episodes of The Office. An ensemble cast including Aziz Ansari, Rashida Jones, Chris Pratt, Aubrey Plaza, Paul Schneider, and Nick Offerman joined Poehler. Poehler played deputy director of the Parks Department Leslie Knope in the fictional city of Pawnee, Indiana. After the first season had received a mixed reception, the show's second season received more positive reviews. One key change between seasons one and two was to distinguish the character of Leslie from Michael Scott, the central character of The Office. Parks decidedly down-played Leslie's ditziness from the first season and emphasized her intelligence, work ethic, and earnest nature instead. A second-season episode, "Galentine's Day", included a new holiday Leslie created celebrating female friendship on February 13. Galentine's Day has since transcended the show with real-life celebrations.

Adam Scott and Rob Lowe joined the show at the end of the second season, with Scott playing Leslie's eventual husband, Ben Wyatt. At the end of filming the second season, Poehler was once again pregnant. The show began producing the first six episodes of season three without a break to accommodate her pregnancy. Poehler was nominated again for the Primetime Emmy Award for Outstanding Lead Actress in a Comedy in 2011. That same year, the show won a Peabody Award for "developing a hilarious venue to explore the good side of American democracy in an age when that side is so rarely on display." The show was a success with critics, but its future was still uncertain. Two episodes were written that could serve as series finales if it was cancelled, including the mid-season episode where Leslie and Ben get married. The show was ultimately renewed for a sixth season in May 2013. Poehler was nominated for an Emmy Outstanding Lead Actress in a Comedy in 2013 for her work in season five. Season six included the show's 100th episode, "Second Chunce", co-written by Poehler and Schur. In 2014, she won the Golden Globe for Best Actress in a Television Series – Comedy at the 71st Golden Globe Awards, which she co-hosted with Tina Fey. In the middle of season six, Poehler and Schur decided that it felt like the right time to plan the end of the show. They met with representatives from NBC, who agreed. The show was renewed for a final thirteen-episode season. Poehler and Schur co-wrote the final episode of the series, "One Last Ride", which aired on February 24, 2015.

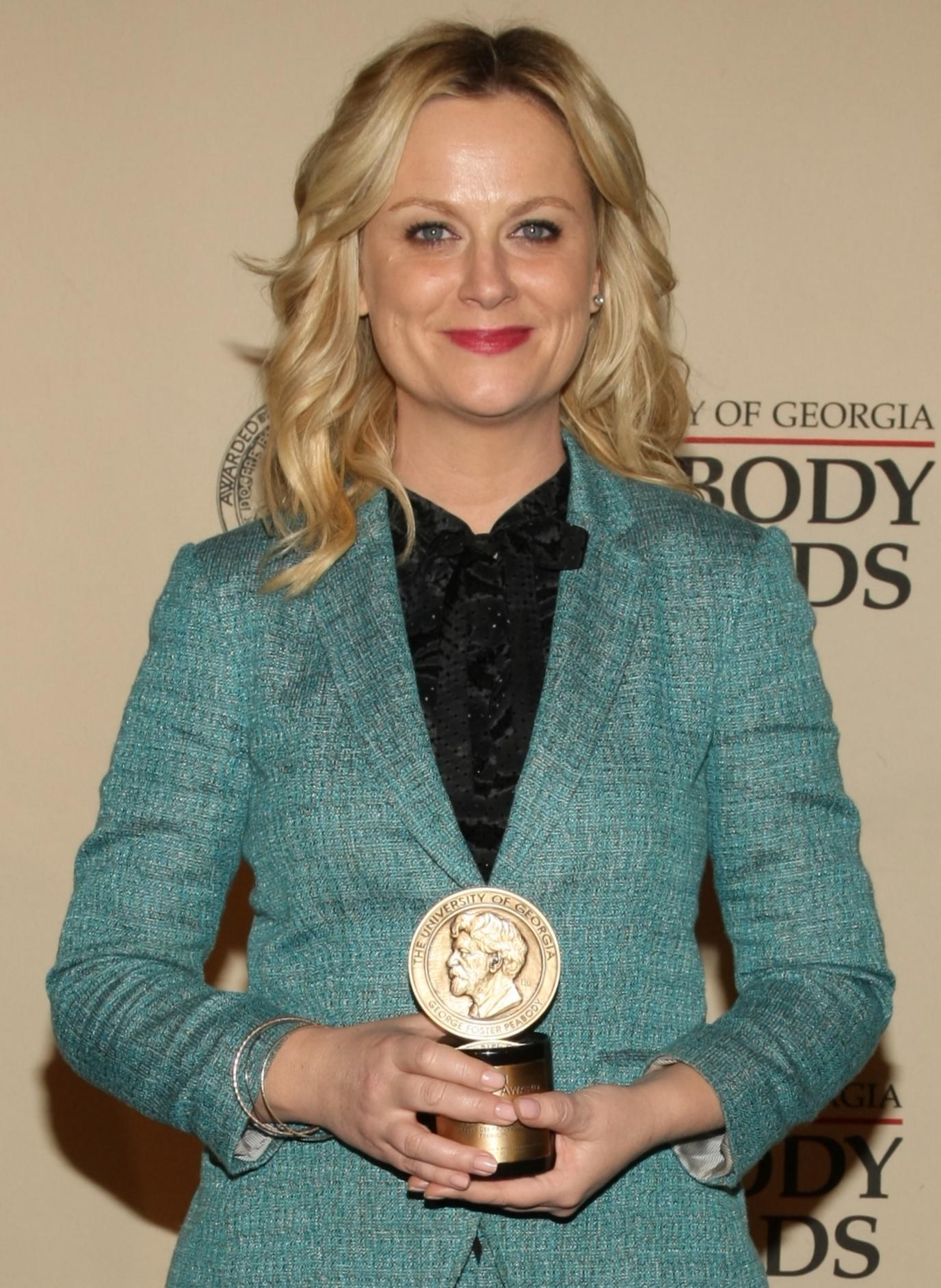
Poehler at the 2012 Peabody Awards

By season 5, in addition to starring on Parks and Recreation, Poehler was also a producer. Behind the scenes, Poehler started a tradition of inviting the show cast and crew to a group dinner the last night of any location shoot. Poehler would start impromptu dance parties in the makeup trailer on set. Poehler wrote several episodes throughout the series, starting with the season two episode "Telethon". Other episodes she penned include "The Fight" (season three), "The Debate" (season four), "Second Chunce" (season six), and the finale "One Last Ride". Producer Dan Goor praised Poehler's writing as "exceptionally good" and theorized, "[i]f Amy Poehler submitted a blind script to any staff, she would be hired." Poehler's writing of "The Debate" was recognized with nominations for the Primetime Emmy Award for Outstanding Writing for a Comedy Series and the Writers Guild of America Award for Television: Episodic Comedy. In addition to writing "The Debate", Poehler also directed the episode. Additionally, she directed the episodes "Article Two" (season five) and "Gryzzlbox" (season seven).

==== Golden Globe Awards host (2013–2021) ====
Poehler and Fey co-hosted the Golden Globe Awards ceremony for the first time in 2013. The program was watched by 20 million viewers, a 17 percent increase over the previous year. The pair co-hosted again in 2014 as part of a three-year contract. Gilbert Cruz of Vulture wrote: "They killed it last year with their opening monologue and they did so again this year." The 2014 show garnered its highest ratings in ten years.

Before the 2015 Golden Globes, Poehler confirmed it would likely be the last time she and Fey hosted. Rolling Stone wrote afterward that the pair "left no superstar unscathed during their riotous opening monologue" in which they "casually roasted the assembled masses". At the 2020 Television Critics Association winter press tour, NBC announced Poehler and Fey would host the Golden Globes again in 2021. Because of the COVID-19 pandemic, Poehler and Fey hosted the Golden Globes from separate locations with Poehler in Los Angeles and Fey in New York City.

==== Acting roles and television work (2009–2015) ====
During this period she starred in the live-action comedy films A.C.O.D. (2013), They Came Together (2014), Sisters (2015) and The House (2017). Poehler has also voiced several characters in animated films. Her voice-over credits include Hoodwinked Too!: Hood vs. Evil (2011), Alvin and the Chipmunks: Chipwrecked (2011), The Secret World of Arrietty (2012), (Note: Poehler was part of the cast for the American dub of the Japanese film. A different cast was used for Great Britain.) Free Birds (2013) and Inside Out (2015). In Pixar's Inside Out, Poehler provides the voice for the main character, Joy, an emotion living inside an 11-year-old girl. Poehler also received a screen credit for writing some of Joy's dialogue. The film has a 98% fresh rating on Rotten Tomatoes and went on to gross $857 million worldwide. Poehler reprised her role as Joy in Inside Out 2, released on June 14, 2024.

In 2001, Poehler set up her own production company, Paper Kite Productions, which is part of Universal Television. As of 2019, the production company's staff is all female. To describe her success as a producer, The Hollywood Reporter called Poehler "a powerful arbiter of sophisticated comedy." Poehler co-created, produced, and starred in an animated series for Nickelodeon titled The Mighty B!, about Bessie Higgenbottom, a "sweet, merit-badge-obsessed girl scout". The character of Bessie was inspired by a character Poehler performed doing improv. Season 1 averaged 3.1 million viewers and ranked as one of the top five animated programs in television. Nickelodeon renewed the show for a second season. In 2009 and 2010, Poehler earned Daytime Emmy Award nominations for Outstanding Performer in an Animated Program.

She has been an executive producer on series such as Difficult People and Broad City. In 2014, Hulu ordered the comedy Difficult People, as the streaming service's first ever scripted series. Starring Billy Eichner and Julie Klausner, Difficult People ran for three seasons. Broad City grew out of a web series starring Abbi Jacobson and Ilana Glazer. Jacobson and Glazer used their connections at UCB to approach Poehler about starring in the finale of their web series. Poehler agreed to appear in it and then joined Jacobson and Glazer to executive produce a television series. After initially selling a script to FX, the project ultimately landed at Comedy Central where it aired for five years until its 2019 series finale. Poehler appeared in the Season 1 finale.

Welcome to Sweden is a Swedish sitcom that premiered in March 2014, and began airing on NBC in the United States three months later. It is based on the experiences of Greg Poehler, who moved with his girlfriend to her native country of Sweden in 2006. The series was canceled by NBC on July 28, 2015, after two seasons due to low ratings. Amy Poehler makes cameo appearances in multiple episodes as herself as a celebrity client of her brother's character, a former New York tax accountant. She is also co-executive producer with him.

=== 2019–present: Career expansion ===
==== Directorial debut and other work ====
Poehler made her film directorial debut with Wine Country, which premiered on Netflix on May 10, 2019. She also stars in the film, along with Maya Rudolph, Rachel Dratch, Ana Gasteyer, Paula Pell, and Emily Spivey. The screenplay is loosely based on a real trip the actresses took together to Napa Valley. Poehler directed the film adaptation of the 2017 novel Moxie by Jennifer Mathieu, also for Netflix, which was released on March 3, 2021. In 2022, Poehler directed Lucy and Desi, a documentary film about the lives and relationship of Lucille Ball and Desi Arnaz. The film premiered on January 21, 2022, at the Sundance Film Festival and was released worldwide on Amazon Prime Video on March 4, 2022. The film includes home audio recordings of Ball and Arnaz that had not before been made public as well as interviews with their two children, Lucie Arnaz Luckinbill and Desi Arnaz Jr., Lucy's brother Fred Ball, Carol Burnett, Bette Midler and Norman Lear, among others. The film was well received, with a 94% rating on Rotten Tomatoes. Poehler was nominated for an Emmy Award for Outstanding Directing for a Documentary/Nonfiction Program. The film was nominated for a total of six Emmy Awards, winning two.

==== Work as an executive producer ====
In March 2017, NBC ordered to series a Poehler-produced crafting series, then-titled The Handmade Project. The show, retitled Making It, debuted on NBC on July 31, 2018, with Poehler and her Parks and Recreation co-star Nick Offerman as co-hosts. The debut episode tied for the highest-rated premiere of summer 2018 and earned Poehler and Offerman a Primetime Emmy Nomination for Outstanding Host for a Reality or Competition Program. The show returned for a second season which aired in December 2019. NBC has picked up Making It for a third season.

Poehler, along with Natasha Lyonne and Leslye Headland, created and executive produced the comedy-drama series Russian Doll for Netflix. The series premiered on February 1, 2019. The genesis of the series started seven years earlier after Poehler remarked Lyonne was always "the oldest girl in the world." Poehler and Lyonne liked the idea of a female character being many things at once but joked the only way to have a female character that complex would be to re-do the part repeatedly. The idea evolved into the series where Lyonne's character dies repeatedly on her 36th birthday. Poehler, Lyonne, and Headland put together an all-female team of writers and directors. The series debuted on Netflix with a 100% fresh rating on the ratings aggregate website Rotten Tomatoes. As of December 28, 2020, the rating remained at 97%.

In June 2016, BBC America announced it is developing a scripted series called Zero Motivation. The project is being executive produced by Brooke Posch and Poehler. Poehler is an executive producer on the upcoming series Three Busy Debras, a comedy series being produced for Adult Swim that stars Mitra Jouhari, Alyssa Stonoha, and Sandy Honig. In addition to serving as an executive producer, Poehler also provides the voices for two main characters in the series Duncanville, which premiered on Fox on February 16, 2020.

== Podcast ==
Poehler's weekly scripted podcast series, Say More with Dr? Sheila, was released on September 21, 2023. On February 10, 2025, it was announced that she would be starting her own new podcast entitled Good Hang with Amy Poehler. It premiered on March 18, 2025, and is produced by Spotify's The Ringer and Poehler's Paper Kite Productions. The episodes feature lowkey interviews with Poehler's comedy friends. and was the inaugural winner of best podcast in the 2026 Golden Globe Awards.

== Personal life ==
Poehler married Canadian actor Will Arnett on August 29, 2003. They met in 1996 when he saw one of her performances and they started dating four years later. During their relationship, Poehler and Arnett worked together on several projects, including the series Arrested Development, the films Blades of Glory, Horton Hears a Who!, and The Secret World of Arrietty. Poehler and Arnett announced their separation in September 2012; and Arnett filed for divorce in April 2014, which was finalized in July 2016.

Poehler and Arnett have two sons: Archie Arnett, born October 25, 2008, and Abel Arnett, born August 6, 2010. Poehler lives with her children in Los Angeles. She praised her children's nannies as part of her Time 100 speech for helping to take care of them and allowing her to balance her career and family.

From 2013 to 2015, Poehler dated fellow comedian Nick Kroll. She has been dating Joel Lovell since 2024.

In 2016, Poehler received a letter from the city of Beverly Hills for her excessive water usage during the state of California's drought that year. Poehler's property usage between May 14 and July 14 exceeded 170,000 US gallons (640,000 L; 140,000 imp gal).

Poehler is a fan of the Beastie Boys. She has a role as a disgruntled cafe patron in the music video for the group's song "Make Some Noise", which was nominated for the MTV Video of the Year in 2011. Poehler wrote a chapter in the Beastie Boys Book that reviews 17 of the group's music videos. In the chapter, Poehler states, "Beastie Boys mean a great deal to me. Their music was the soundtrack I heard while I sat in my room, drank in the woods, and rode my bike to my dead-end job." She is also featured as a voice on the audio version of the book.

Poehler has detailed her severe, exhausting experiences with sleep apnea and her use of a CPAP machine to address it, which she says "helps you win at life,” in her autobiography and in interviews.

== Activism and beliefs ==
She is an active feminist. In September 2008, Poehler, Meredith Walker, and Amy Miles founded Smart Girls at the Party, an online community and digital web series aimed at empowering girls. The first season premiered online on November 17, 2008, with Mattel's Barbie signed on as the lead sponsor. Smart Girls at the Party returned in 2012 as part of the YouTube Original Channel Initiative that focused upon the creation of new content. The new Smart Girls at the Party YouTube Channel went live on July 2, 2012, including new episodes of the series along with additional shows by Poehler, Walker, and Miles.

Four years after the launch of Smart Girls at the Party, digital network company Legendary Entertainment acquired ownership of the project. Poehler said in a statement, "We at Smart Girls are excited to be working with Legendary and look forward to providing funny and inspirational content for all of the goofballs out there." By the time of the deal, over five million views were registered on its YouTube channel and over 550,000 fans had liked the initiative on Facebook. On the Smart Girls YouTube channel, viewers have the opportunity to ask for life advice from Poehler in segments called Ask Amy. Smart Girls celebrated its 10th anniversary in 2018.

Poehler introduces First Lady Michelle Obama on the Fourth Anniversary of Let's Move! in 2014

Poehler has championed a number of social and political causes. In 2012, she collaborated with the National Domestic Workers Alliance to film a public service announcement (PSA) to draw attention to the proposed California Domestic Worker Bill of Rights. The law, providing overtime pay to domestic workers, was signed into law the following year. Poehler also supported One Fair Wage, a campaign to require New York businesses to pay tipped workers the general minimum wage. Poehler has served as a celebrity ambassador for Worldwide Orphans Foundation, traveling to Haiti in 2013. The following year, Poehler joined Michelle Obama in Miami to celebrate the four year anniversary of her Let's Move! youth health initiative.

Poehler's memoir, Yes Please, was published on October 28, 2014, by HarperCollins imprint Dey Street. She explained in a promotional interview with National Public Radio (NPR) that she was "used to writing in characters and not really writing about myself... it was easier to share the early parts of my life rather than my own current events." Topics covered in the book include body image, parenthood, and learning about the limitations of physical appearance. The book debuted at number one on The New York Times Best Seller list.

== Acting credits and accolades ==
In 2015, Poehler received a star on the Hollywood Walk of Fame for her contributions to television. She won a Golden Globe Award for Best Actress in a Television Musical or Comedy Series in 2013 and a Critics' Choice Award for Best Actress in a Comedy Series in 2012. She and Fey won the 2016 Primetime Emmy Award for Outstanding Guest Actress in a Comedy Series for co-hosting SNL. In 2011, Poehler was included on Time's "100 most influential people in the world". She also delivered the Class Day address to Harvard University's class of 2011. The Academy of Motion Picture Arts and Sciences invited Poehler to become a member as part of its 2017 class.

== Bibliography ==
- Poehler, Amy (2014). Yes Please. Dey Street. ISBN 978-0062268341.

== See also ==
- Saturday Night Live parodies of Hillary Clinton

== Notes ==
Media offices
| Preceded by Tina Fey and Jimmy Fallon | Weekend Update anchor 2004–2008; With: Tina Fey 2004–2006, Seth Meyers 2006–2008 | Succeeded by Seth Meyers as sole anchor |
