= Amy Poehler filmography =

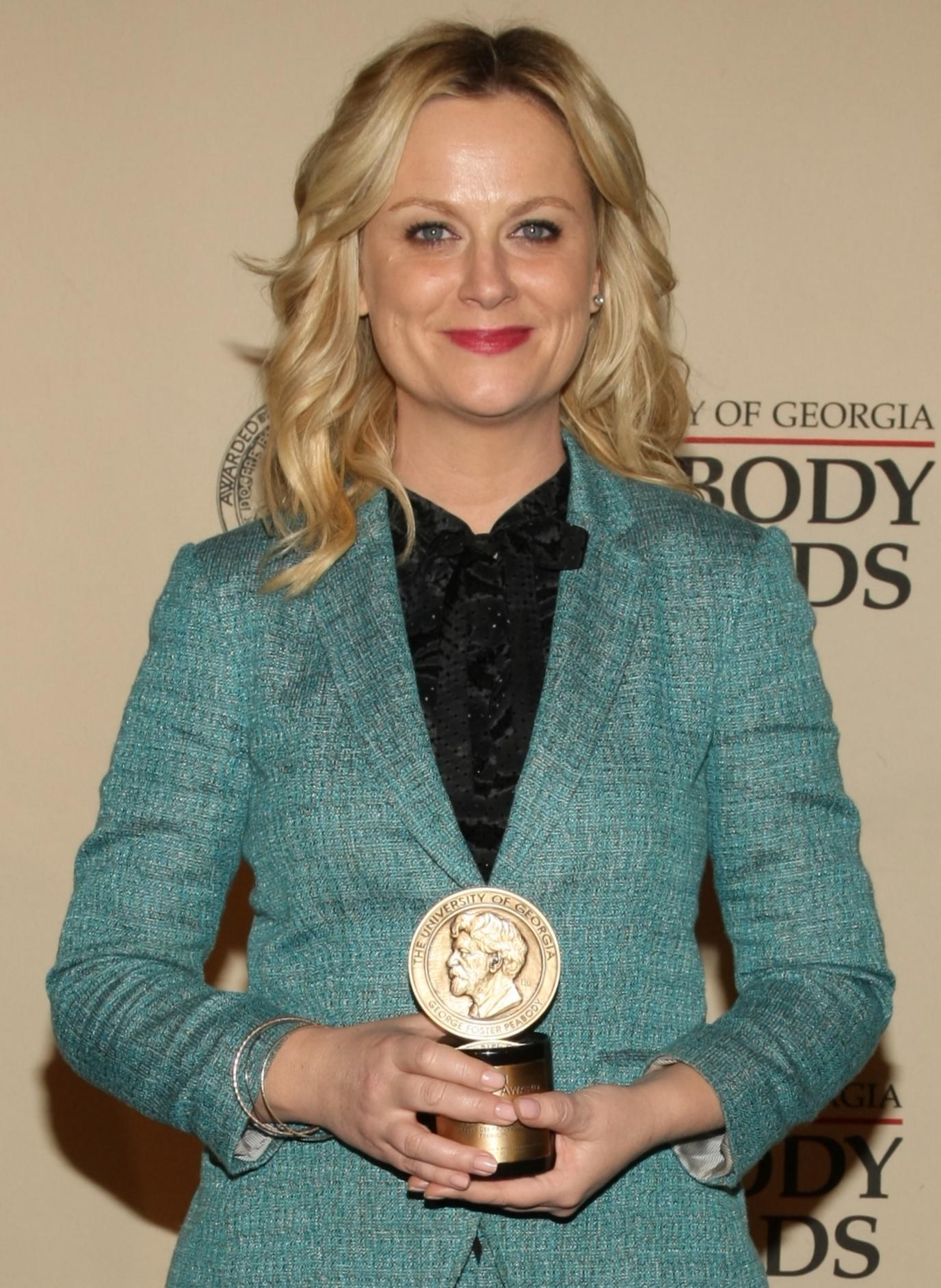
Poehler at the 71st Peabody Awards Luncheon on May 21, 2012

This is the complete filmography of Golden Globe Award and Primetime Emmy Award-winning actress, voice artist, comedian, writer, director, and producer Amy Poehler.

== Film ==
Year	Title	Role	Notes
1998	Tomorrow Night	Woman getting sprayed by hose	
1998	Saving Manhattan	Kirsten	
1999	Deuce Bigalow: Male Gigolo	Ruth	
2000	Zoe Loses It	Pink	Short film
2001	Wet Hot American Summer	Susie	
2002	Martin & Orloff	Patty	
2004	Mean Girls	Mrs. June George	
2004	Envy	Natalie Vanderpark	
2004	Wake Up, Ron Burgundy: The Lost Movie	Bank Teller	Direct-to-DVD
2006	Southland Tales	Veronica Mung/Dream	
2006	Man of the Year	Herself	Cameo
2006	Tenacious D in The Pick of Destiny	Truck Stop Waitress	
2006	The Ex	Carol Lane	
2007	Blades of Glory	Fairchild Van Waldenberg	
2007	On Broadway	Farrah	
2007	Shrek the Third	Snow White	Voice
2007	Shortcut to Happiness	Molly Gilchrest	
2007	Mr. Woodcock	Maggie Hoffman	
2007	Girl Missing	Vikki	Direct-to-DVD
2007	Wild Girls Gone	Doreen	Also writer and producer
2008	Horton Hears a Who!	Sally O'Malley	Voice
2008	Baby Mama	Angie Ostrowski	
2008	Hamlet 2	Cricket Feldstein	
2009	Monsters vs. Aliens	Gallaxhar's Computer	Voice
2009	Spring Breakdown	Gayle	
2009	The Mystery of Claywoman	Celeste Dupree	Short film
2009	Alvin and the Chipmunks: The Squeakquel	Eleanor Miller	Voice
2010	The Secret World of Arrietty	Homily	Voice, US dub
2010	Freak Dance	Lillian	
2011	Fight for Your Right Revisited	Cafe Patron	Short film
2011	Hoodwinked Too! Hood vs. Evil	Gretel	Voice
2011	Alvin and the Chipmunks: Chipwrecked	Eleanor Miller	Voice
2013	A.C.O.D.	Sondra	
2013	Are You Here	Terry Coulter	
2013	Free Birds	Jenny	Voice
2013	Anchorman 2: The Legend Continues	Entertainment News Reporter	Cameo
2014	They Came Together	Molly	
2015	Inside Out	Joy	Voice; also wrote additional dialogue
2015	Riley's First Date?	Joy	Voice; Short film
2015	A Very Murray Christmas	Liz	
2015	Sisters	Maura Ellis	Also executive producer
2017	The House	Kate Johansen	
2019	Wine Country	Abby	Also director, story, executive producer
2021	Moxie	Lisa	Also director and producer
2023	First Time Female Director	Meg	Also producer
2024	Inside Out 2	Joy	Voice

== Television ==
=== Actor ===
Year	Title	Role	Notes
1996	Escape from It's a Wonderful Life	Mary Hatch	Voice; Television special
1997	Apartment 2F	Amy	2 episodes
1997–2000	Late Night with Conan O'Brien	Stacy Richter / Various roles	Weekly segment
1998	Spin City	Susan	Episode: "Single White Male"
1998–2000	Upright Citizens Brigade	Colby / Various roles	30 episodes
2001–08	Saturday Night Live	Various roles	142 episodes
2001	The Challenge	Herself / Coach	Episode: "No Laughing Matter"
2001	Late Friday		1 episode
2001–02	Undeclared	Hillary	3 episodes
2004–05	Arrested Development	Wife of Gob	5 episodes
2005	SpongeBob SquarePants	Gramma	Voice; Episode: "Have You Seen This Snail?"
2005, 2014	The Simpsons	Jenda	Voice; 3 episodes
2006	O'Grady	Wendy	Voice; Episode: "Frenched"
2006	Wonder Showzen	Miss Mary	2 episodes
2008–09	Saturday Night Live Weekend Update Thursday	Herself	5 episodes
2008–11	The Mighty B!	Bessie Higgenbottom	Voice; 40 episodes; main role; co-created
2009–15, 2020	Parks and Recreation	Leslie Knope	126 episodes
2010	Sesame Street	Herself	Episode: "The Camouflage Challenge"
2010–25	Saturday Night Live	Herself / various	3 episodes as host, 10 episodes as guest
2012	Napoleon Dynamite	Misty	Voice; Episode: "Thundercone"
2012	30 Rock	Young Liz Lemon	Episode: "Live from Studio 6H"
2012	Comedy Bang! Bang!	Herself	Episode: "Amy Poehler Wears A Black Jacket & Grey Pants"
2012	Louie	Debbie	Episode: "New Year's Eve"
2013	70th Golden Globe Awards	Herself (co-host)	Television special
2013	The Greatest Event in Television History	Jennifer Hart	Episode: "Hart to Hart"
2014	71st Golden Globe Awards	Herself (co-host)	Television special
2014	Broad City	Cheryl	Episode: "The Last Supper"
2014–15	Welcome to Sweden	Amy Poehler	8 episodes
2014–15	The Awesomes	Jaclyn Stone	Voice; 9 episodes
2014–15	Kroll Show	Winnie	3 episodes
2015	72nd Golden Globe Awards	Herself (co-host)	Television special
2015	Wet Hot American Summer: First Day of Camp	Susie	7 episodes
2015–17	The UCB Show	Herself (host)	16 episodes
2016	Maya & Marty	Herself	Episode: "Will Forte, Amy Poehler and Jerry Seinfeld"
2016	Comedy Central Roast of Rob Lowe	Herself	Television special
2017	Wet Hot American Summer: Ten Years Later	Susie	6 episodes
2017	Difficult People	Flute	Episode: "The Silkwood"
2017	SMILF	Narrator	Episode: "Chocolate Pudding & a Cooler of Gatorade"; uncredited
2018–21	Making It	Herself (co-host)	22 episodes
2020–22	Duncanville	Duncan Harris / Annie Harris / Herself	Voice; 39 episodes
2021	78th Golden Globe Awards	Herself (co-host)	Television special
2022	Norman Lear: 100 Years of Music & Laughter	Herself	Television special
2022	Chicago Party Aunt	Amanda	Voice; Episode: "Doppel Änger"
2022–23	Baking It	Herself (host)	6 episodes
2024	Dream Productions	Joy	Voice; 4 episodes
2026	Dig	TBA	TBA

=== Writer ===
Year	Title	Notes
1996	Escape from It's a Wonderful Life	Television special
1998–2000	Upright Citizens Brigade	Creator
2004	Soundtracks Live	Pilot; creator
2005	ASSSSCAT Improv	Television special
2008–11	The Mighty B!	Co-creator
2010–15	Parks and Recreation	Series Regular
2013	71st Golden Globe Awards	Special content
2014	72nd Golden Globe Awards	Special content
2014	Old Soul	Pilot; creator
2015	73rd Golden Globe Awards	Special content
2015–17	The UCB Show	Creator
2019–22	Russian Doll	Co-creator
2020–22	Duncanville	Co-creator
2026	Dig	Co-creator

=== Executive producer ===
Year	Title	Notes
2005	ASSSSCAT Improv	Television special
2008–11	The Mighty B!	
2009–15	Parks and Recreation	Producer
2012–22	Smart Girls at the Party	Web Series
2014	Old Soul	Pilot
2014–15	Welcome to Sweden	
2014–19	Broad City	
2015–17	Difficult People	
2015–17	The UCB Show	
2016	Dumb Prince	Pilot
2016	Andy Richter's Home for the Holidays	Television special
2018–21	Making It	
2018	I Feel Bad	
2019–22	Russian Doll	
2020–22	Duncanville	
2020–22	Three Busy Debras	
2026	Dig	

=== Director ===
Year	Title	Notes
2012–15	Parks and Recreation	3 episodes
2014	Broad City	Episode: "The Last Supper"
2016	Dumb Prince	Pilot
2019	Wine Country	
2021	Moxie	
2022	Lucy and Desi	
