= List of awards and nominations received by Amy Poehler =

Amy Poehler awards and nominations
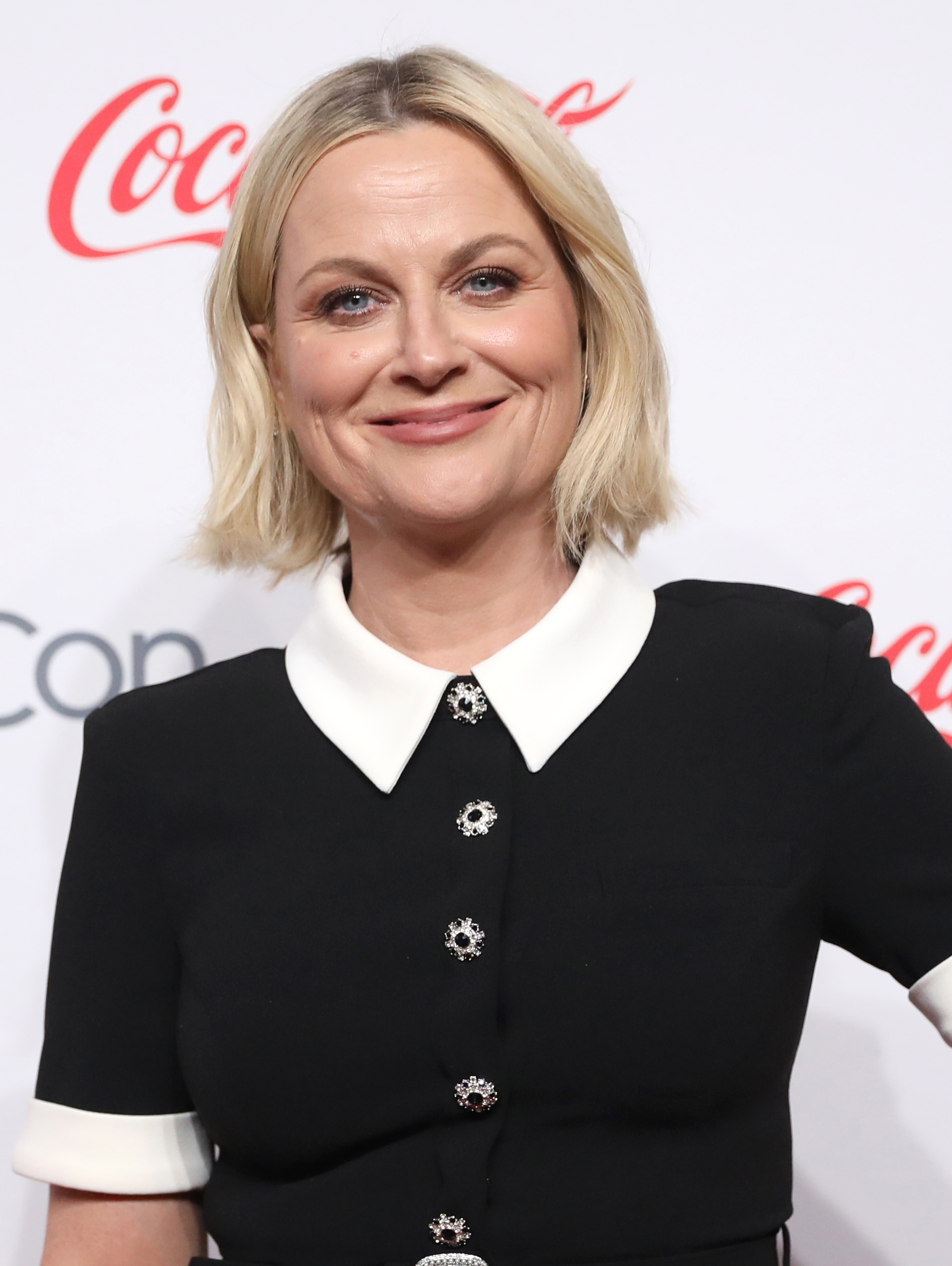
- Poehler in 2024
Awards and nominations
Award	Wins	Nominations
Critics' Choice	0	6
Emmy Awards	1	28
Golden Globes	2	4
Grammy Awards	0	1
PGA Awards	0	1
SAG Awards	0	3
WGA Awards	1	7

Totals (Note: Certain award groups do not simply award one winner. They acknowledge several different recipients, have runners-up, and have third place. Since this is a specific recognition and is different from losing an award, runner-up mentions are considered wins in this award tally. For simplification and to avoid errors, each award in this list has been presumed to have had a prior nomination.)
- Wins: 10
- Nominations: 35

Amy Poehler is an American actress, comedian, writer, and producer. Throughout her career, she has received various accolades including a Primetime Emmy Award, two Golden Globe Awards and a Writers Guild of America Award as well as nominations for six Critics' Choice Awards, a Grammy Award, a Producers Guild of America Award, and three Screen Actors Guild Awards.

Poehler started her career as a cast member on the NBC sketch series Saturday Night Live from 2001 to 2008, where she received nominations for two Primetime Emmy Awards for Outstanding Supporting Actress in a Comedy Series before finally winning the Primetime Emmy Award for Outstanding Guest Actress in a Comedy Series in 2016 when she came to co-host the show alongside Tina Fey. She served as a producer and portrayed Leslie Knope in the NBC sitcom Parks and Recreation (2009–2015) for which she earned a Golden Globe Award for Best Actress – Television Series Musical or Comedy and a Critics' Choice Television Award for Best Actress in a Comedy Series along with nominations for six Primetime Emmy Awards for Outstanding Lead Actress in a Comedy Series and three Screen Actors Guild Awards for Outstanding Actress in a Comedy Series. During this time she earned notoriety for co-hosting the Golden Globe Awards four times in the years 2013, 2014, 2015, and 2021, with Tina Fey. She wrote her biography Yes Please in 2016 which was turned into an audiobook and was nominated for the Grammy Award for Best Spoken Word Album.

As a producer, she produced the Netflix comedy-drama series Russian Doll (2019–2022), which was nominated for the Primetime Emmy Award for Outstanding Comedy Series and the Primetime Emmy Award for Outstanding Writing in a Comedy Series. She co-hosted the NBC reality competition series Making It (2018–2021) with her Parks and Recreation co-star Nick Offerman, for which she was nominated for the Primetime Emmy Award for Outstanding Host for a Reality or Reality Competition Program thrice in 2019, 2020, and 2022. She co-hosted the Peacock reality series Baking It (2021–2023) with Maya Rudolph earning a Primetime Emmy Award nomination in 2023. On film, Poehler has acted in the comedy films Wet Hot American Summer (2001), Mean Girls (2004), Blades of Glory (2007), Baby Mama (2008), and Sisters (2015). She voiced Joy in the Disney-Pixar animated film Inside Out (2015) and its sequel, Inside Out 2 (2024). The former won the Academy Award for Best Animated Feature.

Poelher was included among the Time Magazine's List of 100 Most Influential People in the World in 2011. She received Variety Magazine's Power of Comedy Award that same year. In 2015, Poehler was honored with a star on the Hollywood Walk of Fame.

== Major associations ==
=== Critics' Choice Awards ===
Year	Category	Nominated work	Result	Ref.
Critics' Choice Movie Awards
2011	Best Actress in a Comedy Series	Parks and Recreation	Nominated	
2012	Best Actress in a Comedy Series	Parks and Recreation	Won	
2013	Best Actress in a Comedy Series	Parks and Recreation	Nominated	
2014	Best Actress in a Comedy Series	Parks and Recreation	Nominated	
2014	Best Comedy Series	Broad City	Nominated	
2015	Best Comedy Series	Broad City	Nominated	
Critics' Choice Documentary Awards
2022	Best First Documentary Feature	Lucy and Desi	Nominated	

=== Emmy Awards ===
Year	Category	Nominated work	Result	Ref.
Primetime Emmy Awards
2008	Outstanding Supporting Actress in a Comedy Series	Saturday Night Live	Nominated	
2009	Outstanding Supporting Actress in a Comedy Series	Saturday Night Live	Nominated	
2010	Outstanding Lead Actress in a Comedy Series	Parks and Recreation (episode: "Telethon")	Nominated	
2011	Outstanding Comedy Series	Parks and Recreation (season 3)	Nominated	
2011	Outstanding Lead Actress in a Comedy Series	Parks and Recreation (episode: "Flu Season")	Nominated	
2012	Outstanding Lead Actress in a Comedy Series	Parks and Recreation (episode: "Win, Lose, or Draw")	Nominated	
2012	Outstanding Writing for a Comedy Series	Parks and Recreation (episode: "The Debate")	Nominated	
2013	Outstanding Lead Actress in a Comedy Series	Parks and Recreation (episode: "Leslie and Ben")	Nominated	
2013	Outstanding Special Class Program	70th Golden Globe Awards	Nominated	
2013	Outstanding Writing for a Variety Special	70th Golden Globe Awards	Nominated	
2014	Outstanding Lead Actress in a Comedy Series	Parks and Recreation (episode: "Recall Vote")	Nominated	
2014	Outstanding Special Class Program	71st Golden Globe Awards	Nominated	
2014	Outstanding Writing for a Variety Special	71st Golden Globe Awards	Nominated	
2015	Outstanding Comedy Series	Parks and Recreation (season 7)	Nominated	
2015	Outstanding Lead Actress in a Comedy Series	Parks and Recreation (episode: "One Last Ride")	Nominated	
2015	Outstanding Special Class Program	72nd Golden Globe Awards	Nominated	
2015	Outstanding Writing for a Variety Special	72nd Golden Globe Awards	Nominated	
2016	Outstanding Guest Actress in a Comedy Series	Saturday Night Live (Shared with Tina Fey)	Won	
2019	Outstanding Comedy Series	Russian Doll	Nominated	
2019	Outstanding Writing for a Comedy Series	Russian Doll	Nominated	
2019	Outstanding Host for a Reality or Competition Program	Making It (Shared with Nick Offerman)	Nominated	
2020	Outstanding Host for a Reality or Competition Program	Making It (Shared with Nick Offerman)	Nominated	
2022	Outstanding Documentary or Nonfiction Special	Lucy and Desi	Nominated	
2022	Outstanding Directing for a Documentary Program	Lucy and Desi	Nominated	
2022	Outstanding Host for a Reality or Competition Program	Making It (Shared with Nick Offerman)	Nominated	
2023	Outstanding Host for a Reality or Competition Program	Baking It (Shared with Maya Rudolph)	Nominated	
Daytime Emmy Awards
2009	Outstanding Performer in an Animated Program	The Mighty B!	Nominated	
2010	Outstanding Performer in an Animated Program	The Mighty B!	Nominated	

=== Golden Globe Awards ===
Year	Category	Nominated work	Result	Ref.
2011	Best Actress – Television Series Musical or Comedy	Parks and Recreation	Nominated	
2012	Best Actress – Television Series Musical or Comedy	Parks and Recreation	Nominated	
2013	Best Actress – Television Series Musical or Comedy	Parks and Recreation	Won	
2025	Best Podcast	Good Hang with Amy Poehler	Won	

=== Grammy Awards ===
Year	Category	Nominated work	Result	Ref.
2016	Best Spoken Word Album	Yes Please	Nominated	

=== Screen Actors Guild Awards ===
Year	Category	Nominated work	Result	Ref.
2012	Outstanding Actress in a Comedy Series	Parks and Recreation	Nominated	
2014	Outstanding Actress in a Comedy Series	Parks and Recreation	Nominated	
2015	Outstanding Actress in a Comedy Series	Parks and Recreation	Nominated	

== Miscellaneous awards ==
Year	Association	Category	Nominated work	Result	Ref.
2005	Teen Choice Awards	Choice Comedian	Saturday Night Live	Nominated	
2006	Prism Awards	Best Performance in a TV Comedy Series	Saturday Night Live	Nominated	
2009	Teen Choice Awards	Choice Comedian	Saturday Night Live	Nominated	
2009	MTV Movie Awards	Best WTF Moment	Baby Mama	Won	
2009	MTV Movie Awards	Best Comedic Performance	Baby Mama	Nominated	
2009	People's Choice Awards	Favorite On-Screen Match Up (with Tina Fey)	Baby Mama	Nominated	
2010	People's Choice Awards	Favorite TV Comedy Actress	Parks and Recreation	Nominated	
2011	Satellite Awards	Best Actress — Television Series Musical or Comedy	Parks and Recreation	Nominated	
2011	Television Critics Association	Individual Achievement in Comedy	Parks and Recreation	Nominated	
2012	The Comedy Awards	Best Comedy Actress	Parks and Recreation	Won	
2012	Producers Guild of America	Best Episodic Comedy	Parks and Recreation	Nominated	
2012	Satellite Awards	Best Actress — Television Series Musical or Comedy	Parks and Recreation	Nominated	
2012	Television Critics Association	Individual Achievement in Comedy	Parks and Recreation	Nominated	
2012	Writers Guild of America	Television: Comedy Series	Parks and Recreation	Nominated	
2013	Writers Guild of America	Television: Comedy Series	Parks and Recreation	Nominated	
2013	Writers Guild of America	Episodic Comedy	Parks and Recreation	Nominated	
2013	Gracie Awards	Outstanding Female Actor in a Leading Role – Comedy	Parks and Recreation	Won	
2013	Television Critics Association	Individual Achievement in Comedy	Parks and Recreation	Nominated	
2013	Satellite Awards	Best Actress — Television Series Musical or Comedy	Parks and Recreation	Nominated	
2014	Writers Guild of America	Television: Comedy Series	Parks and Recreation	Nominated	
2014	American Comedy Awards	Best Comedy Actress	Parks and Recreation	Won	
2014	MTV Movie Awards	Best Cameo	Anchorman 2: The Legend Continues	Nominated	
2014	Television Critics Association	Individual Achievement in Comedy	Parks and Recreation	Nominated	
2015	Writers Guild of America	Comedy/Variety (Music, Awards, Tributes) — Specials	71st Annual Golden Globe Awards	Won	
2015	Satellite Awards	Best Actress — Television Series Musical or Comedy	Parks and Recreation	Nominated	
2015	Detroit Film Critics Society	Best Ensemble	Inside Out	Nominated	
2016	Annie Award	Voice Acting in a Feature Production	Inside Out	Nominated	
2016	Nickelodeon's Kids' Choice Awards	Favorite Voice in an Animated Movie	Inside Out	Won	
2016	People's Choice Awards	Favorite Animated Movie Voice	Inside Out	Nominated	
2020	Writers Guild of America	Comedy Series	Russian Doll	Nominated	
2020	Writers Guild of America	New Series	Russian Doll	Nominated	
2022	Peabody Awards	Documentary	Lucy and Desi	Nominated	

== Honorary awards ==
Organizations	Year	Award	Result	Ref.
Time Magazine	2011	Included in the Time 100 List of Influential People in the World	Honored	
Variety	2011	Power of Comedy Award	Honored	
Women in Film	2019	Entrepreneur in Entertainment	Honored	
Hollywood Walk of Fame	2015	Motion Picture Star	Honored	
Bring Change to Mind	2024	Robin Williams Legacy of Laughter Award	Honored	
Peabody Awards	2025	Career Achievement Award	Honored	
