= Mr. Bob's Toddler Kaleidoscope =

- Up All Night episode
- Episode no.: Season 1 Episode 5
- Directed by: Troy Miller
- Story by: Liz Cackowski; Alex Reid
- Teleplay by: Erica Rivinoja
- Production code: 105
- Original air date: October 12, 2011

Episode chronology
← Previous "New Car"	Next → "Birth"

"Mr. Bob's Toddler Kaleidoscope" is the fifth episode of the American television series, Up All Night. The episode originally aired on NBC on October 12, 2011. The teleplay was written by Erica Rivinoja and the story by Liz Cackowski and Alex Reid. The episode was directed by Troy Miller, his first directing credit of the series. The episode received mixed reviews from critics and marked a drop in the ratings from the previous episode.

== Plot ==
The episode revolves the play group that Reagan and Chris take Amy to. Reagan starts to feel that her work is getting in the way of her spending time with Amy. So she takes Amy to Mr. Bob's playgroup, where she is upstaged by another mother. Reagan makes several attempts to become a better mother, which ends up with her getting kicked out of the playgroup by Mr. Bob (Michael Hitchcock).

Also, Ava has to prepare to give a big speech, and is worried about how she will sound. Reagan refuses to write the speech for Ava, to spend more time with Amy. Ava gets Missy to help write the speech, although she isn't much help. Chris also believes he may have found his calling, Amy's playgroup. In the end, Reagan writes the speech for Ava and makes peace with Kayla's mom (Missi Pyle).

== Production ==
This episode marks Jennifer Hall's first credit as a series regular, having only been a recurring for the past few episodes.
