= Up All Night (TV series) =

American television sitcom

- Genre: Sitcom
- Created by: Emily Spivey
- Starring: Christina Applegate; Maya Rudolph; Will Arnett; Jennifer Hall; Luka Jones
- Composers: Martyn LeNoble; Vince Jones
- Country of origin: United States
- Original language: English
- No. of seasons: 2
- No. of episodes: 35

Production
- Executive producers: Lorne Michaels; Erin David; DJ Nash; Emily Spivey; Jon Pollack; Tucker Cawley
- Producers: Anna Dokoza; Christina Applegate; Eric Kranzler; Andrew Singer; Tim McAuliffe; Vera Santamaria
- Editors: Rick Blue; Myron Kerstein; Kevin D. Ross; Debra F. Simone; Dean Holland
- Camera setup: Single-camera
- Running time: 22 minutes
- Production companies: Broadway Video; Universal Media Studios (episodes 1-6); Universal Television (episodes 7-35); Open 4 Business Productions

Original release
- Network: NBC
- Release: September 14, 2011 – December 13, 2012

Up All Night is an American television sitcom created by Emily Spivey that aired on NBC from September 14, 2011, to December 13, 2012. The show starred Christina Applegate, Will Arnett, Jennifer Hall, Luka Jones, and Maya Rudolph.

== Synopsis ==
The series follows Reagan (Christina Applegate), a producer on her best friend Ava's (Maya Rudolph) talk show, and Chris (Will Arnett), Reagan's supportive, stay-at-home husband, as they try to adjust to life with their newborn baby Amy.

The second season focuses on the cancellation of Ava's talk show, and Chris starting a business with Reagan's brother Scott (Luka Jones). Reagan also struggles to adjust to her new role as a stay-at-home mother.

== Development and production ==
=== Conception ===
The series was based on creator Emily Spivey's life when she went back to working on Saturday Night Live after giving birth to a baby boy. Due to the nature of her job, she was required to take care of the baby and work late nights. She decided she wanted to make a show based on those extremes. NBC executives were "supportive and excited" about the new series. On February 1, 2011, Up All Night received a pilot order, written by creator Spivey and directed by James Griffiths, under the title Alpha Mom. The series was officially picked up for thirteen episodes at the NBC upfronts on May 15, 2011 under its final title, Up All Night.

After the success of Maya Rudolph's movie Bridesmaids, Up All Night was retooled so that her character Ava was a talk-show host and Reagan was the show's producer, instead of them being PR executives. Spivey said the character change allowed Ava to be funner. Some media critics compared the character change to Rudolph's impersonation of Oprah Winfrey on Saturday Night Live. The series was later given a full-season pickup on October 4, 2011. On November 21, 2011, NBC added two additional episodes to season one, bringing the total to 24 episodes.

It was also the last show to be produced by Universal Media Studios, along with Free Agents and Whitney.

=== Crew ===
The series was produced by Broadway Video and Universal Media Studios. The series was created by Emily Spivey who serves as executive producer alongside Lorne Michaels, Jon Pollack, and Erin David. David had worked with Spivey and Michaels on Saturday Night Live while Pollack had worked with Michaels on 30 Rock. Series co-star Christina Applegate also worked as a producer on the series alongside Eric Kranzler and Andrew Singer.

=== Cancellation ===
In October 2012, it was announced that Up All Night would go on hiatus eleven episodes into its second season to convert from a single-camera setup to a multiple-camera setup shot in front of a live audience. During the hiatus, series creator Emily Spivey and star Christina Applegate left the show and Will Arnett was cast in a CBS pilot, which eventually became the two-season series The Millers.

After months of rumors of cancellations, Up All Night was officially cancelled by NBC on May 9, 2013 after two seasons and was not renewed for a third season.

== Cast and characters ==
=== Main cast and characters ===
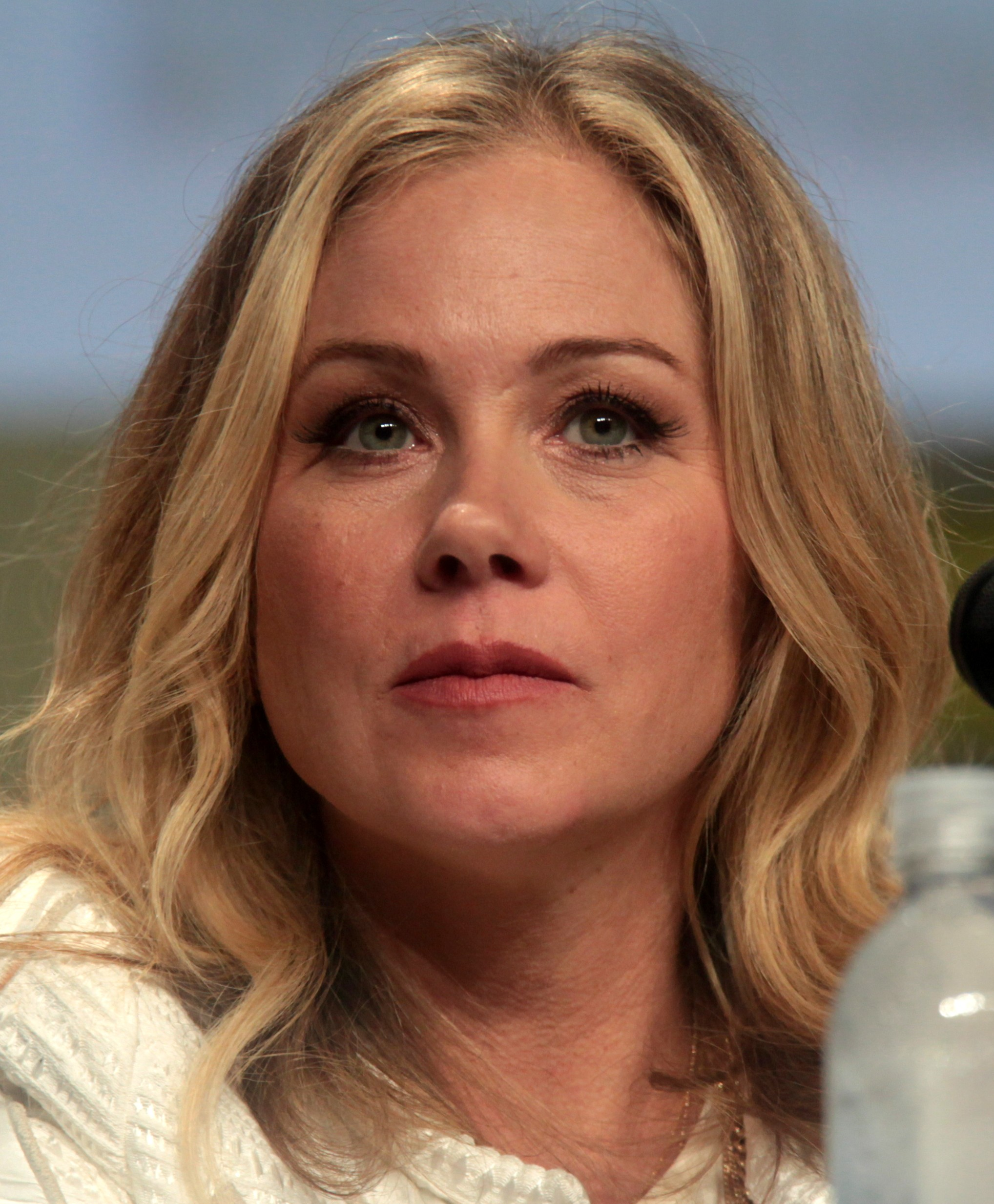
Christina Applegate was the first cast member to sign up for the series

- Christina Applegate as Reagan Brinkley, a producer for the Ava show, who goes back to work after giving birth. Applegate was interested in the series early on, especially because she had recently had a child. Applegate was also offered several other roles for the pilot season. Applegate was the first cast member signed on to the series. She is credited as a producer for the series.
- Will Arnett as Chris Brinkley, a former lawyer and now stay-at-home dad. Arnett was the third main cast member to sign on to the series.
- Maya Rudolph as Ava Alexander, the host of the Ava show and Reagan's best friend. Rudolph was the second main cast member to sign on to the series. Rudolph had previously worked with the series creator on SNL and Spivey had wanted to work with Rudolph before the series plot was established.
- Jennifer Hall (Season 1) as Missy, Ava's assistant. Hall was the final member to sign on to the series and was initially a recurring actor. She was officially added to the main cast list in the fifth episode, "Mr. Bob's Toddler Kaleidoscope". Due to retooling of the show for the second season, she did not return as a series regular.
- Luka Jones (Season 2) as Scott Chafin, Reagan's laid-back brother, who moves back to town with his son after going through a divorce. Jones joined the main cast at the start of season two.

=== Recurring cast and characters ===
- Matt Braunger as Gene Marden, Terry's husband and Reagan and Chris's next door neighbor.
- Jean Villepique as Terry Marden, Gene's wife and Reagan and Chris's next door neighbor.
- Jason Lee as Kevin, Reagan and Chris's next door neighbor who dated Ava.
- Molly Shannon as Nancy, Amy's babysitter. Shannon was initially a one-time guest star, before the producers asked her to appear in another episode. Her second episode aired in early 2012. She is a former cast member of Saturday Night Live and previously worked with Michaels on the series.
- Nick Cannon as Calvin, Ava's co-host on her talk show.
- Chris Diamantopoulos as Julian, Ava's eccentric ex-boyfriend.
- Will Forte as Reed, Chris's gamer friend, who is also a father.
- Carly and Delaney Prince as Amy
- Steven Pasquale as Luke Granby, the new boss of the Ava show, who has a hard time getting along with Ava and Reagan.
- Megan Mullally as Shayna Mund, a competing talk show host, who Ava and Reagan helped lose a large amount of weight during segments of the Ava show.
- Mary Elizabeth Ellis as Connie Chafin
- Quinn Friedman as Kyle Chafin
- Rob Huebel as Jerry, Chris's obnoxious college roommate, and Ava's boyfriend.
- Ben Falcone as Justin, Reagan and Chris's neighbor.
- Chloe Csengery as McKenna
- Sean Hayes as Walter
- Adam Gregor as Barry
- Blythe Danner as Dr. Angie Chafin, Reagan's heavily critical psychologist mother. She first appeared in "Parents", and then tried to be a better mother and grandmother in "First Christmas".

Several guest actors have also appeared. Richard Schiff appeared in "Parents" as Reagan's dad. Alanis Morissette appeared in "Travel Day" as a former partner in an R&B duo with Ava. Stevie Nicks appeared in the episode titled "Letting Go" as herself, and former Saturday Night Live writer Jorma Taccone, has appeared on the show in "Working Late and Working It". The "Daddy Daughter Time" featured a cameo by Sharon Osbourne as Ava's rival over a parking space and Ava's father is played by Henry Winkler.

== Episodes ==
Season	Episodes	Originally released	
Season	Episodes	First released	Last released
1	24	September 14, 2011	April 12, 2012
2	11	September 20, 2012	December 13, 2012

=== Season 1 (2011–12) ===
No. overall	No. in season	Title	Directed by	Written by	Original release date	Prod. code	US viewers (millions)
1	1	"Pilot"	James Griffiths	Emily Spivey	September 14, 2011	101	10.95
After giving birth to her baby, Reagan (Christina Applegate) decides to return to work with the support of her stay-at-home husband Chris (Will Arnett). Once she returns to work, Reagan must deal with the endless needs of her friend and boss, Ava (Maya Rudolph) the host of her own talk show, that Reagan works as a producer on.
2	2	"Cool Neighbors"	Joe Russo	Caroline Williams	September 21, 2011	102	6.05
When a new couple moves into the neighborhood, Chris and Reagan become obsessed with finding out how they are so cool. Meanwhile, Ava tries to figure out why the baby Amy does not seem to like her but takes a liking to Calvin (Nick Cannon).
3	3	"Working Late and Working It"	Joe Russo	Tim McAuliffe	September 28, 2011	104	5.32
Chris and Reagan try to bring the sexy back into their marriage with the help of Chris's new friend Reed (Will Forte). Meanwhile, Ava blames Reagan for the advice that led her to break up with her now engaged ex-boyfriend, B-Ro (Jorma Taccone).
4	4	"New Car"	James Griffiths	Emily Spivey	October 5, 2011	103	5.60
Chris and Reagan go online shopping to try to find a potential family car. Meanwhile, Ava attempts to take on more serious talk show topics, however, she finds the amount of preparation it takes way too overwhelming.
5	5	"Mr. Bob's Toddler Kaleidoscope"	Fred Savage	Story by : Liz Cackowski & Alex Reid; Teleplay by : Erica Rivinoja	October 12, 2011	105	5.24
While Reagan worries that all the time she spends working may be affecting her parental skills, Ava struggles with the fact that Reagan is too busy to spend quality time with her, so she enlists Missy's (Jennifer Hall) help to prepare a speech instead of Reagan. Chris believes that he may have found his calling in Amy's playgroup.
6	6	"Birth"	Randall Einhorn	Dan Mintz	October 19, 2011	106	5.63
Flashbacks reveal when Reagan was pregnant with Amy, and her "perfect" birth plan fell apart; Chris struggled with the decision to leave his law firm, and Ava, with the help of Missy, overcame her fears that were keeping her away from Reagan at the time.
7	7	"Parents"	James Griffiths	Erica Rivinoja	November 2, 2011	107	4.78
Reagan attempts to have a better relationship with her parents to set a good example for Amy; When a crew member on Ava's talk show dies, Ava attempts to a get along better with her crew. Meanwhile, in fear of his life being cut short, Chris decides to make some lifestyle changes.
8	8	"First Night Away"	Jay Chandrasekhar	Caroline Williams	November 9, 2011	108	4.79
Reagan and Chris try to reignite the spark in their relationship by going on a date night. Meanwhile, Ava spends the night babysitting Amy and connects with Reagan and Chris's next-door-neighbor Kevin (Jason Lee), a single dad who is completely different from her current boyfriend, Julian (Chris Diamantopoulos).
9	9	"Hiring and Firing"	Randall Einhorn	Tim McAuliffe	November 16, 2011	109	4.88
When Reagan finds it difficult to fire a less-than-helpful assistant, Nancy (Molly Shannon), Ava starts to believe she has lost her edge. Chris and Reagan attempt to find a babysitter, so they can have some time to themselves, and after a few misunderstandings with Reagan, Missy keeps thinking she's been fired.
10	10	"Week Off"	Bob Berlinger	David Iserson & Brian Rowe	November 23, 2011	110	4.34
When the Ava show takes a break, Reagan is thrilled to spend the week at home with Amy, but her type-A personality and defiant sense of justice upset the delicate balance of Chris's neighborhood social life. Meanwhile, Ava tries to win over Kevin's daughter by giving her vocal lessons for a performance at school.
11	11	"First Christmas"	Troy Miller	Tucker Cawley	December 7, 2011	111	4.96
Reagan asks her mothers help to make Amy's first Christmas the best. Meanwhile, Chris goes to the mall to find the perfect gift for Reagan, and Ava starts to believe her relationship with Kevin may be on rocky ground, when he decides to spend Christmas with his ex-wife.
12	12	"New Year's Eve"	Beth McCarthy-Miller	Erica Rivinoja	January 12, 2012	112	4.24
During Reagan and Chris's first New Year's Eve game night, Reagan's competitiveness comes out causing Chris to become embarrassed. Meanwhile, Missy brings an unexpected date along to the party and, Kevin starts to feel as though Ava may be ashamed of him.
13	13	"Rivals"	Michael Blieden	Caroline Williams	January 19, 2012	113	3.98
Ava and Reagan's former friend and rival talk-show host Shayna (Megan Mullally) is suspected of stealing ideas from Ava's talk show. Meanwhile, Reagan shows some jealousy toward Chris's new female friend (Emily Rutherfurd).
14	14	"Preschool Auction"	Beth McCarthy-Miller	Brian Rowe	February 2, 2012	114	3.70
In an attempt to secure a spot for Amy at a prestigious preschool, Reagan volunteers to run the school's annual fundraiser, and asks Ava to help with the charity auction. Meanwhile, Chris reverts to his old competitive ways when his brother (Dean Winters) comes to visit.
15	15	"Day After Valentine's Day"	Joe Russo	Caroline Williams & Tim McAuliffe	February 9, 2012	115	3.65
Reagan and Chris attempt to have a drama free Valentine's day. However, when Ava and Kevin have a fight, Reagan and Chris unintentionally create some drama in their relationship.
16	16	"Travel Day"	Randall Einhorn	Emily Spivey	February 16, 2012	116	2.98
Reagan and Chris travel with Amy for the first time. Meanwhile, Ava agrees to be the minister for her former bandmate's wedding (portrayed by Alanis Morissette), and while she is officiating the wedding, Kevin tries to deal with how Ava feels about marriage.
17	17	"First Birthday"	Jorma Taccone	Tucker Cawley	February 23, 2012	117	3.42
Chris reluctantly agrees to throw a joint birthday party for Amy with an overly enthusiastic neighbor. Meanwhile, Nancy begins looking for a man.
18	18	"New Boss"	Randall Einhorn	Erica Rivinoja	March 1, 2012	118	3.47
On the cusp of the fifth anniversary of "Ava," Reagan and Ava's idol, Yvonne Encanto (Eve Best), acquires the show. This acquisition brings more than they were expecting when Yvonne's right hand, Luke Granby (Steven Pasquale), an ex-military man, takes charge as the new boss. Meanwhile, Chris and Reed decide to refurbish Reed's recently inherited motorcycle.
19	19	"Couple Friends"	James Griffiths	Alex Reid	March 8, 2012	119	3.44
Reagan and Chris decide they need new couple friends, so they try to befriend their neighbors Justin (Ben Falcone) and Lawrence (Nat Faxon). Meanwhile, Ava continues to fight with Luke over her show. However, things end up getting a little bit more personal when Luke attempts to use Ava to make his ex-fiance jealous.
20	20	"Baby Fever"	Jay Chandrasekhar	Barbara Adler	March 15, 2012	120	3.49
Chris attempts to convince Reagan to have another baby. Meanwhile, Ava ends up with a huge disappointment when she joins Yvonne's mentorship program.
21	21	"Daddy Daughter Time"	Troy Miller	Story by : Caroline Williams & David Iserson; Teleplay by : David Iserson	March 22, 2012	121	3.25
Ava's father (Henry Winkler) and his family come to visit, however they are more interested with meeting the celebrities on the show. Chris ends up getting a segment on the Ava show, which causes Reagan to realize that she needs to have her own time by herself at work.
22	22	"Letting Go"	James Griffiths	Tucker Cawley	March 29, 2012	122	3.01
Amy's walking for the first time; Ava's new dog affects Reagan and Ava's chances at getting Stevie Nicks to appear on the Ava show. Chris joins a younger hockey league which may be a bit too much for him.
23	23	"Hey Jealousy"	Michael Blieden	Story by : Tim McAuliffe; Teleplay by : Erica Rivinoja	April 5, 2012	123	2.58
Chris starts to display some jealousy toward Reagan working more closely with her boss Luke. Meanwhile, Ava hires a celebrity personal trainer named Gideon Kirk (Fred Armisen), to help her beat Shayna in a 10k run for charity.
24	24	"The Proposals"	Troy Miller	Jon Pollack & Emily Spivey	April 12, 2012	124	3.12
Reagan turns to Chris' grandmother for help when she accidentally loses her engagement ring, which spurs Chris into attempting to give Reagan a proper proposal. Meanwhile, Kevin returns and tries to win back Ava, by turning to Julian for help.

=== Season 2 (2012) ===
On May 11, 2012, the series was renewed for a second season. The second season originally featured 13 episodes and aired Thursdays at 8:30/7:30c after 30 Rock. Luka Jones joined the cast from the beginning of season two, playing the role of Reagan's brother, Scott.

On October 29, 2012, it was announced that NBC had ordered three extra episodes, bringing the season total to 16 episodes, and that the show was going to change from a single camera format to a multi camera format.

No. overall	No. in season	Title	Directed by	Written by	Original release date	Prod. code	US viewers (millions)
25	1	"Friendships & Partnerships"	Michael Blieden	Emily Spivey & Tucker Cawley	September 20, 2012	201	3.11
"The Ava Show" is cancelled - Reagan and Ava's friendship is tested following the news of the show's cancellation. Meanwhile, Reagan hires her brother Scott to help remodel their bathroom, and Chris decides to re-enter the working world.
26	2	"Home/Office"	Michael Blieden	DJ Nash & Emily Spivey	September 27, 2012	202	3.26
Reagan's first week at home with Amy may upset the delicate balance of the neighborhood.
27	3	"Swingers"	Bryan Gordon	Erica Rivinoja	October 4, 2012	203	3.13
Reagan and Chris try to prove they're not boring. Elsewhere, Ava gets rid of clutter with help from Scott and meets her biggest fan.
28	4	"Jerry Duty"	Michael Blieden	Chadd Gindin	October 11, 2012	204	2.88
Chris relives his college days when he reunites with his former roommate.
29	5	"Another Saturday Night"	Eric Appel	Erica Rivinoja	October 18, 2012	207	2.99
Reagan and Chris head for a long overdue night out.
30	6	"Ma'am'd"	Michael Blieden	Emily Spivey	October 25, 2012	206	3.21
After failing to get Chris's attention, Reagan worries that she is losing her romantic touch. A visit to the dentist (Tony Hale) gives her a much needed confidence boost. Meanwhile, when Ava learns her neighbors are not so fond of her, she teams up with Walter (Sean Hayes) to give the neighborhood a haunted house like they have never seen before.
31	7	"Thanksgiving"	Jennifer Getzinger	Austen Earl & Joel Church-Cooper & Rene Gube	November 15, 2012	209	3.10
When Reagan causes Chris to miss his favorite holiday - the annual Thanksgiving with his family back in Maryland - she's determined to give him an even better Thanksgiving at home. Meanwhile, Ava and Walter go on a quest to do charity work on Thanksgiving, only to find they're needed in the most unlikely place. Elsewhere, Scott tries to put together a Thanksgiving dinner with his friend Paul (Will Sasso) and some other divorced dads.
32	8	"The Game of Life"	Michael Blieden	Chadd Gindin	November 29, 2012	208	2.97
Reagan, Chris and Scott get invited to join Gene (Matt Braunger) and Terry (Jean Villepique) at their mountain cabin for their annual "Family Funlympics." Meanwhile, when Reagan decides she needs to leave the cabin to go and check up on Ava, she is shocked to learn that Ava has new friends.
33	9	"I Can't Quit You"	Jennifer Getzinger	Tim McAuliffe	December 6, 2012	205	2.92
While Reagan secretly hangs out with her ex-sister-in-law, Connie (Mary Elizabeth Ellis), Chris and Scott compete for jobs against Scott's ex-father-in law. Meanwhile, Ava takes a fan and her family on an unusual "Hollywood" tour.
34	10	"First Snow"	Bryan Gordon	Vera Santamaria & Chadd Gindin	December 13, 2012	210	2.87
The holiday season is off to a not-so-great start for the Brinkleys.
35	11	"The Wedding"	Alex Reid	Emily Spivey & Kayla Alpert	December 13, 2012	211	2.68
Take a look back at Chris and Reagan's wild wedding day.

== Reception ==
=== Broadcast ===
Up All Night previewed in the 10:00 pm timeslot behind America's Got Talent with Free Agents following it. The following week it debuted in its regular timeslot at 8:00 pm, and was eventually the only new comedy after Free Agents was cancelled. Starting January 12, the series was moved behind NBC's hit series, The Office, switching timeslots with Whitney. Some media critics have said that the goal for moving the series was in order to make it a ratings success, like The Office.

=== Reviews ===
The performances are spot-on, the jokes are great, if a bit understated, and the situation in this situation comedy actually feels credible. In a year when a large number of new sitcoms passed off hackneyed conventions as hip cultural satire, Up All Night rang surprisingly true.

— Phillp Maciak, Slant Magazine

Up All Night has received mostly positive reviews from critics. The first season currently holds a score of 64 out of 100 on Metacritic, indicating generally positive reviews.

Many critics said that the series felt like two different shows in one. HitFix reviewer Daniel Feinberg gave the series pilot a positive review, but disliked the office settings and the writing for Rudolph's character commenting that "Will Arnett and Christina Applegate are playing parents, but Maya Rudolph is playing a sitcom character". Despite this, the performance of the main cast members has received praise from critics.

Some critics compared Rudolph's role to her impersonation of Oprah Winfrey while she was on SNL, which Rudolph firmly denied saying "I have yet to see the similarities between my character and Oprah". Some publications declared it among the best TV shows of 2011, new or old, including Slant Magazine and Hulu.

Slate writer Hanna Rosin has praised the show in particular for slowly subverting the sitcom archetype of the father incompetent at managing the household.

Chris started out as an idiot who stayed home with the baby because he had nothing better to do. In early episodes, he propped up the infant on the couch so he could play his video games or watch hockey, and didn't really notice when she tipped over. But over time he has morphed into the sane, sensible parent we all want to be. Now his role is to check his wife's crazy competitive instincts and to never renege on a promise made to his daughter. In fact, the show's main innovation is creating a reliable stay-at-home dad whose wife still wants to sleep with him.

The show then went further, she recalled, by then assigning the usual role of a sitcom dad to Reagan. "[She] turned into a version of Ralph Kramden, prone to tantrums and meddling," Rosin writes. "Like the classic doltish dad, she creates elaborate schemes to fix domestic problems but only winds up making everything worse. And then Chris swoops in, Alice-style, to make it all better."

=== Ratings ===
During its first season, Up All Night was a moderate success in the ratings by network's standards (at the time, NBC was the fourth highest-rated network out of five networks). The series had ranked as NBC's fourth highest rated scripted series after The Office, Smash and Law & Order: Special Victims Unit among adults between the ages of 18 and 49. The series also ranked as one of the most digitally recorded series of the season. Due to the moderate success, the series was given a full season pick up alongside Whitney. The cost for an ad for the series was approximately $82,617 per 30-second commercial.

Season	Timeslot (ET)	# Ep.	Premiered		Ended		TV Season	Rank	Viewers (in millions)
Season	Timeslot (ET)	# Ep.	Date	Premiere Viewers (in millions)	Date	Finale Viewers (in millions)	TV Season	Rank	Viewers (in millions)
1	Wednesday 10:00 pm (Premiere); Wednesday 8:00 pm (2011); Thursday 9:30 pm (2012)	24	September 14, 2011	10.95	April 12, 2012	3.12	2011–2012	#112	5.29
2	Thursday 8:30 pm	11	September 20, 2012	3.11	December 13, 2012	2.68	2012–2013	#122	3.64

=== Awards and nominations ===
Awards and nominations for Up All Night
Year	Award	Category	Recipients and nominees	Outcome
2011	Satellite Awards	Best Supporting Actress in a TV Series, Mini-Series or TV Movie	Maya Rudolph	Nominated
2012	Casting Society of America Awards	Outstanding Achievement in Casting for a Comedy Pilot	Shani Ginsberg, Allen Hooper & Jeff Greenberg	Nominated
2012	Gracie Allen Awards	Outstanding Female Actor in a Comedy Series	Christina Applegate	Won
2012	People's Choice Awards	Favorite New TV Comedy		Nominated
2012	NAACP Image Awards	Outstanding Supporting Actor in a Comedy Series	Nick Cannon	Won
2012	NAACP Image Awards	Outstanding Supporting Actress in a Comedy Series	Maya Rudolph	Nominated
2012	NAMIC Vision Award	Best Comedy Performance	Maya Rudolph	Nominated
2012	Satellite Awards	Best Actor in a Comedy Series	Will Arnett	Nominated
2012	Satellite Awards	Best Actress in a Comedy Series	Christina Applegate	Nominated
2012	Satellite Awards	Best Comedy Series		Nominated
2012	Satellite Awards	Best Supporting Actress in a TV Series, Mini-Series or TV Movie	Maya Rudolph	Nominated
2012	Women's Image Network Awards	Outstanding Actress in a Comedy Series	Christina Applegate	Nominated
2012	Women's Image Network Awards	Outstanding Comedy Series		Nominated
2012	Women's Image Network Awards	Outstanding Female Producer	Emily Spivey	Nominated
