= Pilot (Up All Night) =

- Up All Night episode
- Episode no.: Season 1 Episode 1
- Directed by: James Griffiths
- Written by: Emily Spivey
- Production code: 101
- Original air date: September 14, 2011

Episode chronology
← Previous —	Next → "Cool Neighbors"

"Pilot" is the first episode of the first season of the American comedy television series Up All Night and the show's first episode overall. The episode premiered in the United States on NBC on September 14, 2011. The episode was written by series creator Emily Spivey and was directed by James Griffiths.

"Pilot" introduces each of the main characters, as well as establishes the basic premises of the series. In the episode, Reagan (Christina Applegate) decides to return to work after giving birth to her baby with the support of her stay-at-home husband Chris (Will Arnett). Once she returns to work, Regan must deal with the endless needs of her friend and boss, Ava (Maya Rudolph), the host of her talk show, on which Regan works as a producer.

"Pilot" debuted Up All Night in a special timeslot between America's Got Talent and Free Agents at 10:00 p.m. According to Nielsen Media Research, the episode received 10.95 million viewers and received a 3.7 rating/10% share in the 18–49 demographic, ranking first in its timeslot. It currently ranks as the highest-rated episode of the series. The episode also received mostly positive reviews from critics.

== Plot ==
After giving birth to her baby, Reagan (Christina Applegate) decides to return to work with the support of her stay-at-home husband Chris (Will Arnett). Once she returns to work, Regan must deal with the endless needs of her friend and boss, Ava (Maya Rudolph), the host of her talk show, on which Regan works as a producer on.

== Production ==
"Pilot" was written by series creator Emily Spivey and was directed by James Griffiths. The series was based on creator Spivey's life when she went back to working on Saturday Night Live after giving birth to a baby boy. Due to the nature of her job, she was required to take care of the baby and work late nights. She decided she wanted to make a show based on those extremes. On February 1, 2011, Up all Night received a pilot order. Applegate was the first cast member signed on to the series. She is credited as a producer for the series. Rudolph was the second main cast member to sign on to the series. Rudolph had previously worked with the series creator on SNL and Spivey had wanted to work with Rudolph before the series plot was established. Arnett was the third main cast member to sign on to the series. The series was officially picked up for 13 episodes on May 15, 2011. After the success of Maya Rudolph's movie Bridesmaids, Up All Night went through some retooling which now has her character Ava, as a talk-show host, and Reagan now as the show's producer, instead of them being PR executives. This led to Rudolph's character being compared to Rudolph's impression of Oprah on Saturday Night Live.

== Reception ==
=== Ratings ===
The pilot was first shown on September 14, 2011, in the United States on NBC. It was shown between America's Got Talent and the short-lived NBC series, Free Agents. In its original American broadcast, the pilot was viewed by an estimated 10.950 million viewers and received a 3.7 rating/10% share among adults between the ages of 18 and 49, according to Nielsen Media Research. This means that it was seen by 3.7% of all 18- to 49-year-olds, and 10% of all 18- to 49-year-olds watching television at the time of the broadcast. The episode ranked first in its timeslot beating CBS series Big Brother which received a 2.9 rating/8% share in the 18–49 demographic and ABC series Nightline which received a 1.2 rating/3% share in the demo. Despite the good ratings for the premiere, the series had a large drop at the 15-minute mark dropping from a 4.2 rating to a 3.3 rating in the 18–49 demographic.

=== Reviews ===
"Pilot" received mostly positive reviews. The success of the pilot led to the series holding a rating of 64/100 on Metacritic from 25 reviews. The A.V. Club reviewer Erik Adams called the episode "one of the funniest pilots of the new fall season" commenting that "showrunner Emily Spivey does well not to mine the saccharine elements of parenthood. She makes Up All Night’s intentions apparent from the moment that Arnett and Applegate can’t bring themselves to quit cursing in front of lil’ Amy." Another A.V. Club reviewer Emily VanDerWerff was slightly more negative towards the pilot, writing that "[t]he pilot for Up All Night isn’t very funny, especially given the people working on it, but it’s often well-observed.". Her main criticism was that the series was "essentially, two shows in one" calling the workplace scenes "like a copy of many other shows on the air". The two reviewers eventually gave the series a B. HitFix reviewer Daniel Feinberg gave the series pilot a positive review, but disliked the office settings and the writing for Rudolph's character, commenting that "Will Arnett and Christina Applegate are playing parents, but Maya Rudolph is playing a sitcom character". He ultimately gave the series a B−, rating the Baby Scenes a B+ and the Rudolph scenes a C/C−.
