= Unscripted =

American comedy drama series

- Genre: Comedy drama
- Directed by: George Clooney; Grant Heslov
- Starring: Krista Allen; Bryan Greenberg; Jennifer Hall; Frank Langella
- Country of origin: United States
- Original language: English
- No. of seasons: 1
- No. of episodes: 10

Production
- Executive producers: Grant Heslov; George Clooney; Steven Soderbergh
- Producers: Joanne Toll; Michael Hissrich; Tommy Hinkley; Grant Heslov; Matt Adler
- Production location: Los Angeles, California
- Cinematography: Tom Inskeep
- Editors: Chris Figler; James Haygood; Kristofer Lindquist; Rob Seidenglanz
- Running time: 22-26 minutes
- Production companies: Section Eight; Warner Bros. Television; HBO

Original release
- Network: HBO
- Release: January 9 – February 27, 2005

Unscripted is an American comedy drama series that aired on HBO in early 2005. The series was largely improvised by its performers. It was executive produced by Steven Soderbergh, George Clooney, and Grant Heslov.

Unscripted is the second HBO series Clooney and Soderbergh collaborated on that has an improvisational structure, after K Street. Clooney directed the first five episodes and Heslov directed the last five episodes.

== Synopsis ==
Unscripted follows the misadventures of three struggling actors, who are all in the same acting class in Los Angeles, California, as they make the rounds from auditions to rejection and from personal struggle and to satisfaction. The three all play themselves, as the show blends fact with fiction as a movie/show within a show. It features many cameo appearances from stars playing themselves either in projects they're involved in, or involved in a social function, such as Brad Pitt, Angelina Jolie, Noah Wyle, Hank Azaria, Richard Kind, Meryl Streep, Uma Thurman, Jon Lovitz, Shia LaBeouf, Keanu Reeves, Sam Rockwell, Danny Comden, Bonnie Hunt, George Lopez, Barry Corbin, director Doug Liman and producer Akiva Goldsman.

== Main characters ==
- Bryan Greenberg - A young twentysomething actor bouncing from audition to audition. A generally good man brought down by the frustrations of trying to make it, including backstabbing, shady network contracts and being virtually unnoticed on the small screen if he even makes the final cut. Greenberg's real-life role on the show One Tree Hill, as well as his landing of a role in the film Prime, are incorporated into the series as plot lines.
- Krista Allen - A single mother and actress better known for her looks than for her talent, trying to establish herself as a serious performer. Often typecast in print ads or commercials as the "sexy girl", she is rarely taken seriously, and when opportunities arise, she gets passed over for someone with a bigger name.
- Jennifer Hall - A nice girl her agents deem insufficiently attractive, taking low-level jobs on major film productions. Naively finds herself in the Hollywood machine in trying to land roles by knowing who's who in the industry.
- Goddard Fulton (Frank Langella) - The protagonists' stern but fatherly acting teacher, a refined man whose professionalism and guidance remain in the classroom but virtually disappear outside it. Despite keeping a distance from his students outside of teaching, Fulton helps them however he can in the classroom.

== Other characters ==
- Nick - Bryan's roommate, who often steals his auditions and schemes ways to achieve success. He winds up starring in a genital herpes commercial and auditioning for a pornographic film without his knowledge. Played by Nick Paonessa.
- Dragon - Another of Bryan's friends in the acting class who winds up dating Jennifer. Played by Erik Weiner.
- Pam - An actress in the class who hooks up with Nick. Played by Pamela Adlon.
- Diane - An actress in the class who has a romantic history with Goddard. Played by Diane Baker.
- The English theatre director Aaron Mullen plays himself.

== Critical reception ==
Unscripted received mixed reviews. Nathan Rabin of The A.V. Club wrote, "At its most bittersweet, Unscripted captures the vulnerability of actors fighting off that nagging internal voice that says maybe they just aren't fated to make it big, and their careers will peak with bit parts, softcore porn, or roles on second-rate soaps or sitcoms." Tom Shales of The Washington Post wrote a positive review, saying, "If there's anything television doesn't need—or so you'd think—it's another show about show business…[but] Unscripted succeeds credibly and entertainingly in deglamorizing an occupation that most of us still probably think of as exciting and glittery even at its most rudimentary level” and "it definitely grows on you the way good but quirky shows do."

Tim Goodman of the San Francisco Chronicle was more critical, writing, "Unscripted is a miss, and not because this cinema verite-styled show mixes fiction and reality in a way that is—what's the word?—confusing. It's not even that the series is insiderish. HBO's other series about actors in Los Angeles, Entourage, is so inside that you'll need a Daily Variety to find your way back out. The difference is that series is compelling." He concluded, "Unscripted certainly does better attempting humor than trying to draw sympathy, but it lacks something inside."

== Home media ==
The entire series was released on Region 1 DVD in the U.S. on October 18, 2005, by HBO Home Video.
