= Liz Cackowski =

American actress and comedian

- Born: United States
- Occupations: Actress; comedian; comedy writer
- Years active: 2003–present
- Spouse: Akiva Schaffer (m. 2010)
- Children: 2

Liz Cackowski is an American actress, comedian, and comedy writer.

== Career ==
Cackowski began her comedy career at The Second City in Chicago. This led to her hiring by Saturday Night Live, where she worked as a writer from 2004 to 2006. Since leaving SNL, she and Maggie Carey created an online series called The Jeannie Tate Show.

She appeared in feature films such as Forgetting Sarah Marshall and I Love You, Man. She also co-starred as "Byte" in the Adult Swim series Fat Guy Stuck in Internet in 2008 and as a housewife in "Infomercials" in 2014. In early 2009, Cackowski wrote for the short-lived ABC sitcom In the Motherhood. From 2009 to 2010, she worked as a writer and story editor on the NBC comedy series Community. Her brother is comedian Craig Cackowski, who has also appeared with guest roles on Community. She also wrote for the short-lived NBC sitcom Up All Night. She wrote 2 episodes of 2015 comedy The Last Man on Earth on Fox.

She also played the role of Wendy, the realtor in the comedy movie Neighbors (2014), and in its sequel Neighbors 2: Sorority Rising (2016).

== Personal life ==
Her surname is Polish. She is married to Akiva Schaffer, whom she met when they were both writing for the 2005 MTV Movie Awards.

== Filmography ==
As actress

- Forgetting Sarah Marshall (2008) - Liz Bretter
- I Love You, Man (2009) - Zooey's Friend
- Cloudy with a Chance of Meatballs (2009) - Flint's Teacher (voice role)
- The Watch (2012) - Carla
- The To Do List (2013) - Aerobics instructor
- Neighbors (2014) - Wendy the Realtor
- Search Party (2014) - Kenny's Mom
- Neighbors 2: Sorority Rising (2016) - Wendy the Realtor
- Popstar: Never Stop Never Stopping (2016) - Poppies Producer
- Wine Country (2019) - Sommelier
- An American Pickle (2020) - Susan O'Malley
- Licorice Pizza (2021) - Stage Mom
- Chip 'n Dale: Rescue Rangers (2022) - Tigra and Officer O'Hara
