= Wine Country (film) =

American comedy film directed by Amy Poehler

- Official release poster
- Directed by: Amy Poehler
- Screenplay by: Emily Spivey; Liz Cackowski
- Story by: Amy Poehler; Emily Spivey; Liz Cackowski
- Produced by: Morgan Sackett; Amy Poehler
- Starring: Rachel Dratch; Ana Gasteyer; Amy Poehler; Maya Rudolph; Paula Pell; Emily Spivey; Cherry Jones; Maya Erskine; Jason Schwartzman; Tina Fey
- Cinematography: Tom Magill
- Edited by: Julie Monroe
- Music by: Wendy Melvoin; Lisa Coleman
- Production companies: Paper Kite Productions; Paper Pictures; Dunshire Productions
- Distributed by: Netflix
- Release dates: May 8, 2019 (United States); May 10, 2019 (Netflix)
- Running time: 103 minutes
- Country: United States
- Language: English

Wine Country is a 2019 American comedy film co-produced and directed by Amy Poehler (in her feature directorial debut) from a screenplay written by Emily Spivey and Liz Cackowski, based on a story conceived by Poehler, Spivey, and Cackowski. Starring Poehler, Maya Rudolph, Rachel Dratch, Ana Gasteyer, Paula Pell, Spivey, Jason Schwartzman, and Tina Fey, the film follows a group of longtime friends who take a vacation to Napa Valley as a birthday getaway. The film was released in select theaters on May 8, 2019, and digitally released for streaming on May 10, 2019, by Netflix.

== Plot ==
Abby decides to celebrate her friend Rebecca's 50th birthday with a weekend getaway over her protests that she wants a low-key celebration. Abby, Rebecca and four of their friends, whom they have known since they were young waitresses in a pizzeria, decide to spend the weekend together in Napa.

Rather than allow them to relax and drink, Abby wants them to adhere to a strict schedule, a way of seizing control, as unbeknownst to the rest of her friends, she has recently lost her job. All the others are struggling with their own problems: Rebecca is in denial that her husband is inattentive and her friends hate him; Naomi is afraid of receiving test results from her doctor; successful businesswoman Catherine feels they are cutting her out; Val is looking for love; and Jenny, a depressed writer, is simply miserable in life.

On Friday, the friends eat at an expensive restaurant, where Val flirts with their waitress, Jade.

The following morning, the women have a sinister tarot reading from a woman called Lady Sunshine. Afterwards, they go day-drinking around Napa. Near the end of their tour, there is tension when Abby snaps at the others for not adhering to their schedule. When Rebecca confronts her about her attitude, Abby reveals that she lost her job. In anger, Abby throws out the schedule and the women decide to go to Jade's art gallery opening.

They are shocked that Jade's art is all related to The Nanny. During a Q&A Abby rants on how younger generations have it too easy, but ends her speech by saying that they are "fine — Fran Fine" (in reference to Fran Drescher's character on the show The Nanny), causing the art-goers to believe she is a part of the exhibit. Val stays behind to flirt with Jade, but when she tries to ask her out, Jade assumes she is trying to buy a painting; humiliated, Val agrees to buy it.

Returning home drunk and miserable, Abby is propositioned by Devon, the housekeeper, and has sex with him.

The next morning, Naomi goes to wish Rebecca a happy birthday. She finds her on the floor, having thrown out her back. Rebecca reveals that spending the night on the floor led to the epiphany that she hates her life. She agrees to adhere to Abby's schedule; all the women, except Catherine, whom they can't find, go to brunch.

Catherine eventually arrives and accuses the others of trying to cut her out. Naomi tells her she is locked in a self-fulfilling prophecy as work means she has no time for her friends and not spending more time with her friends makes her work harder. Naomi then reveals she also has problems, as she is waiting on the results of a BRCA1 and BRCA2 test. She then storms out of the restaurant. After Rebecca tells Abby that the birthday weekend is more for her than for Rebecca, Abby storms out as well.

Naomi and Abby are pursued by the rest of the women in a golf cart. Naomi is bitten on the ankle by a snake; as they can't get cell phone reception, Val decides to run down the side of the steep hill they are on to get help. One by one, the other women follow Val down the side of the hill. Catherine is the last one to go and gives an emotional speech at the top of the hill about why she is planning to turn down a lucrative job opportunity to spend more time with her friends, a speech they don't hear.

Arriving at the hospital, they learn that Naomi is fine. Catherine also calls the doctor for her and learns Naomi's blood tests came back negative.

That night, the women sit around drinking and invite the loner local owner of the house they are staying in, Tammy, to join them.

== Cast ==
- Amy Poehler as Abby
- Rachel Dratch as Rebecca
- Ana Gasteyer as Catherine
- Maya Rudolph as Naomi
- Paula Pell as Val
- Emily Spivey as Jenny
- Tina Fey as Tammy
- Maya Erskine as Jade
- Jason Schwartzman as Devon
- Cherry Jones as Lady Sunshine
- Jay Larson as Brian
- Liz Cackowski as Lisa
- Sunita Mani as Dolly
- Greg Poehler as Doctor Dickswing
- Brené Brown as herself

== Production ==
=== Development ===
On March 20, 2018, it was announced that Netflix had greenlit a comedy film entitled Wine Country. It was reported that Amy Poehler would make her feature directorial debut with the film, and also executive produce alongside Carla Hacken and Morgan Sackett. The film was written by Emily Spivey and Liz Cackowski. Production companies involved include Paper Kite Productions, Paper Pictures, and Dunshire Productions.

=== Casting ===
The film's initial announcement confirmed that Poehler and Spivey would star in the film, alongside Rachel Dratch, Ana Gasteyer, Paula Pell, Maya Rudolph, and Tina Fey. Later in March 2018, it was announced that Maya Erskine, Jason Schwartzman and Cherry Jones had also joined the cast.

=== Filming ===
Principal photography began on March 22, 2018 in Los Angeles, California, and also took place in Napa, California. On May 4 and 5, filming took place in Calistoga, California. Filming had reportedly ended by early June 2018.

== Release ==
The film was released in select theaters on May 8, 2019 and on Netflix on May 10, 2019.

== Reception ==
On review aggregator Rotten Tomatoes, the film holds an approval rating of 66% based on 86 reviews, with an average rating of 5.9/10. The website's critical consensus reads, "Wine Country's comedy might not be quite as robust as fans of this ensemble will expect, but it's got sweetness on the nose and a nicely balanced finish." Metacritic, which uses a weighted average, assigned the film a score of 56 out of 100, based on 21 critics, indicating "mixed or average reviews".

David Ehrlich of IndieWire gave the film a grade of B− and praised the chemistry between the cast. Benjamin Lee of The Guardian was also positive, writing "There's an engaging, hard-to-fake chemistry between the group and while scenes often have a naturalistic tone, there's a refreshing lack of indulgence, something that can afflict comedies populated by real-life friends." Lee also appreciated how "there's no Apatow-enforced romantic subplot…and it feels like a film about women made by women."

Other reviews expressed that "none of the jokes feel as barbed-wire sharp as the material you know these brilliant comic actresses could have come up with if they tossed out the script and just ad-libbed."
