= Yes Please =

2014 book by Amy Poehler

- Author: Amy Poehler
- Language: English
- Genre: Autobiography
- Publisher: Dey Street
- Publication date: October 28, 2014
- Publication place: United States
- Media type: Hardcover
- Pages: 329
- ISBN: 9780062268341

Yes Please is a 2014 book by American actress and television writer Amy Poehler. Poehler announced the book in January 2013. It was released on October 28, 2014, by HarperCollins imprint Dey Street, and was described as "full of humor and honesty and brimming with true stories, fictional anecdotes and life lessons" by the publisher.

At the 58th Annual Grammy Awards, the audio version of Yes Please received nomination in the category for the Best Spoken Word Album.

== Reception ==
The book received mixed reviews from literary critics. Laura Miller reviewed the book for The Guardian and said, "Yes Please is unable to make a virtue out of its author’s lack of sharp edges. In person, Poehler can do this, and it’s a remarkable achievement, but on the page she tends to wax bland." Similarly, Dwight Garner of The New York Times was not pleased with the book by saying: "Yes Please reminds you of that squeaky fact: Even smart, hilarious people, the ones you wish were your great friends, sometimes can't write."

Mary McNamara writing for Los Angeles Times was more positive about the book, and said: "Not everything in Yes Please works [...], but many things are funny, and as with most of her comedy". McNamara also said that the writing is "choppy and self-consciously eccentric" and added: "[Poehler] is a smart and funny woman who isn't either of those things all the time and doesn't mind admitting it because she thinks that's important too". Rachel Dry of The Washington Post commented: "So she is funny and honest. Writing a book is hard, and that seems to be the truth. At least she made some good jokes about it."
