= Jennifer Hall =

American actress

- Born: October 20, 1977 (age 48); United States
- Occupation: Actress
- Years active: 2000–present

Jennifer Hall (born October 20, 1977) is an American actress most known for starring as a fictionalized version of herself on the HBO series Unscripted and playing Missy on the NBC sitcom Up All Night.

== Early career ==
Jennifer Hall studied at Solano Community College, Fairfield, California; Ithaca College, Ithaca, New York, (BFA in Musical Theater in 1999) and made her film acting debut in the movie Confessions of a Dangerous Mind. Hall performed in various Broadway and off-Broadway shows, including The Wild Party with Eartha Kitt, and is part of the band Thistle LLC, performing under the name Speedie.

== Current career ==
Hall has guest starred in many TV shows including Law & Order: Special Victims Unit, Sabrina the Teenage Witch, Monk, Nip/Tuck, House, CSI: Crime Scene Investigation and Private Practice. Hall has also had a regular role on Unscripted as herself and writer and performer of Fluffy Bunnies and Big Brother on #1.4, she also starred in Legally Blonde, an unsold TV pilot as Elle Woods.

Hall co-starred on the first season of the NBC sitcom Up All Night as Missy, Ava's long suffering assistant.

== Filmography ==
=== Film ===
Year	Title	Role	Notes
2002	Confessions of a Dangerous Mind	Georgia	
2005	Bewitched	Cafe Waitress	
2006	Lenexa, 1 Mile	Natalie	
2007	Callback	Jill	
2008	Finding Amanda	Wendy	
2008	Broken Windows	Amy	
2010	30 Is the New 12	Cassidy	Short
2015	Rumination	Penelope Hall	Short
2015	Lost & Found	Mom	Short
2016	Dicky Sledgehammer: The Case of Sunday Stone	Cindy	Short

=== Television ===
Year	Title	Role	Notes
2000	Law & Order: Special Victims Unit	Annette Fleming	"Honor"
2000	All My Children	Mindy	1 episode
2003	Sabrina the Teenage Witch	Fate Ashley	"Romance Looming"
2003	Legally Blonde	Elle Woods	Unsold television pilot
2004	Yes, Dear	Marjorie	"Shirley Cooks with Love"
2004	NCIS	Daphne Everett	"Vanished"
2005	Monk	Abby	"Mr. Monk Goes to the Office"
2005	Criminal Minds	Clara	"Compulsion"
2005	Bitter Sweet	Amanda	TV film
2005–2006	Unscripted	Herself	Main role; 10 episodes
2006	Nip/Tuck	Monica Wilder	"Monica Wilder", "Shari Noble", "Faith Wolper, PhD"
2007	CSI: Miami	Cathy Gibson	"No Man's Land", "Man Down"
2008	House	Melanie	"It's a Wonderful Lie"
2008	CSI: Crime Scene Investigation	Nora O'Toole	"A Thousand Days on Earth"
2010	Private Practice	Renee	"Shotgun"
2010	Castle	Rebecca Strong	"Overkill"
2011	Unleashed	Penny McDaniel	Recurring role
2011	The Christmas Pageant	Anita Corning	TV film
2011–12	Up All Night	Missy	Main role
2015	Comedy Sketch TV Time, Okay?	Various	"The Retirement Plan"
2016	Meat	Julie Partipilo	TV film
