= Parents (Up All Night) =

- Up All Night episode
- Episode no.: Season 1 Episode 7
- Directed by: James Griffiths
- Written by: Erica Rivinoja
- Production code: 107
- Original air date: November 2, 2011

Guest appearances
- Richard Schiff, Blythe Danner

Episode chronology
| ← Previous "Birth" | Next → "First Night Away" |

"Parents" is the seventh episode of season one of the American television comedy series, Up All Night. The episode originally aired on November 2, 2011, on NBC.

== Plot ==
Reagan attempts to have a better relationship with her parents to set a good example for Amy. When a crew member on Ava's talk show dies, Ava attempts to get along better with her crew. Meanwhile, in fear of his life being cut short, Chris decides to make some lifestyle changes.

== Production ==
On September 27, 2011, Entertainment Weekly reported that Richard Schiff would appear on the show as Christina Applegate's dad.

== Reception ==
=== Ratings ===
In its original American broadcast, "Parents" was viewed by an estimated 4.78 million households and received a 1.8 rating/5% share among adults between the ages of 18 and 49. This means that it was seen by 1.8% of all 18- to 49-year-olds, and 5% of all 18- to 49-year-olds watching television at the time of the broadcast. This marked a 14% drop in the ratings from the previous episode, "Birth", marking a series low in the ratings. The episode ranked fourth in its timeslot, only beating a rerun of the CW drama series, Ringer. Added with DVR viewers who viewed the episode within three days of the original broadcast, the episode received a 2.7 rating in the 18–49 demographic, adding a 0.9 rating to the original viewership.
