= Emily Spivey =

American comedy writer

- Born: September 29, 1971 (age 54); Statesville, North Carolina, U.S.
- Occupations: Writer, producer, actress
- Years active: 2000–present
- Known for: Saturday Night Live; Up All Night; Bless the Harts
- Spouse: Scott Philbrook
- Children: 1

Emily Spivey (born September 29, 1971) is an American television writer and producer. She is best known as the creator of the series Up All Night and Bless the Harts. She previously worked as a staff writer on Saturday Night Live from 2001 to 2010. She won an Emmy Award in 2002 and a WGA Award in 2008, both for her work on Saturday Night Live.

== Biography ==
Spivey was born in Statesville, North Carolina and grew up in High Point, North Carolina. She graduated from T. Wingate Andrews High School. She earned her bachelor's degree from the University of North Carolina at Greensboro and her master's degree from Loyola Marymount University in Los Angeles.

In Los Angeles, she joined The Groundlings. Spivey wrote for the show King of the Hill, which she left to go write for Saturday Night Live in 2001. She left the show in 2010, a few episodes before the end of the 35th season, after nine years as writer. She was promoted to writing supervisor for what ended up being her final season.

In 2011, Spivey created the sitcom Up All Night featuring Christina Applegate and Will Arnett. The show aired for two seasons.

In addition to writing the script, Spivey is also part of the ensemble cast of the Netflix movie Wine Country.

Spivey is married to film editor and paranormal podcast host Scott Philbrook. They have a son born in 2009.

== Writing credits ==
- MADtv (2000–2001)
- King of the Hill (2002)
- Saturday Night Live (2001–2010)
- Parks and Recreation (2011)
- Up All Night (2011–2012) - Creator (debut)
- Murder Police (2013) - Unaired pilot
- Modern Family (2013)
- The Last Man on Earth (2015–2016)
- Maya & Marty (2016)
- Masterminds (2016)
- Wine Country (2019)
- Bless the Harts (2019–2021) - Creator
- How I Met Your Father (2022)
- Loot (2024)

== Filmography ==
Year	Title	Role	Notes
2013-2015	The Awesomes	Concierge (voice)	
2014	Brooklyn 99	Dr. Gertrude Mindel	
2019	Wine Country	Jenny	
2019–2021	Bless the Harts	Louise (voice)	Also creator of the show
2023	Barry	Gina	
