= Four Weddings and a Funeral (miniseries) =

2019 American romantic comedy TV miniseries

- Genre: Romantic comedy
- Based on: Four Weddings and a Funeral by Richard Curtis
- Developed by: Mindy Kaling; Matt Warburton
- Starring: Nathalie Emmanuel; Nikesh Patel; Rebecca Rittenhouse; John Reynolds; Brandon Mychal Smith; Zoe Boyle; Sophia La Porta; Harish Patel; Guz Khan
- Composer: Lesley Barber
- Country of origin: United States
- Original language: English
- No. of episodes: 10

Production
- Executive producers: Charles McDougall; Tristram Shapeero; Charlie Grandy; Howard Klein; Jonathan Prince; Matt Warburton; Tracey Wigfield; Mindy Kaling; Richard Curtis
- Producer: Mark Murdoch
- Cinematography: Gavin Finney; Stijn Van Der Veken
- Editors: Mat Greenleaf; Katie Abel; Adam Burr; Jessica Sisk
- Running time: 44–55 minutes
- Production companies: Kaling International; Philoment Media; 3 Arts Entertainment; MGM Television; Universal Television

Original release
- Network: Hulu
- Release: July 31 – September 11, 2019

Four Weddings and a Funeral is an American romantic comedy television miniseries, based on the 1994 British film of the same name written by Richard Curtis. The miniseries, which premiered on July 31, 2019, on Hulu, was created by Mindy Kaling and Matt Warburton. It stars Nathalie Emmanuel, Nikesh Patel, Rebecca Rittenhouse, Brandon Mychal Smith, and John Reynolds.

== Premise ==
Four Weddings and a Funeral follows "four American friends — Maya, Craig, Ainsley, and Duffy — who reunite for a fabulous London wedding. But after a bombshell at the altar throws their lives into turmoil, they must weather a tumultuous year of romance and heartbreak. Relationships are forged and broken, political scandals exposed, London social life lampooned, love affairs ignited and doused, and of course, there are four weddings...and a funeral."

== Cast and characters ==
=== Main ===
- Nathalie Emmanuel as Maya Jones, a political speechwriter from the United States who recently moved to London to be closer to her best friends from college
- Nikesh Patel as Kashif (Kash) Khan, Ainsley's ex-fiancé and an unhappy investment banker who wants to become an actor
- Rebecca Rittenhouse as Ainsley Howard, an interior designer whose parents fund her interior design business and apartment
- John Reynolds as Caleb Duffy (Duffy), a Latin teacher who wants to become a novelist. He has been secretly in love with Maya for a decade.
- Brandon Mychal Smith as Craig Thompson, an investment banker who is also Kash's office mate and friend
- Zoe Boyle as Gemma Thorpe-Blood, Ainsley's British neighbor and friend who is a housewife
- Sophia La Porta as Zara, Craig's girlfriend, later wife
- Harish Patel as Haroon Khan, Kash's father who works at Heathrow Airport
- Guz Khan as Basheer, one of Kash's friends

=== Recurring ===
- Krrish Patel as Asif Khan, Kash's little brother
- Hector Bateman-Harden as Giles, Gemma and Quentin's son
- Nathan Stewart-Jarrett as Tony 2, Ainsley's assistant at her interior design business
- Rakhee Thakrar as Fatima, Kash's ex-girlfriend and Basheer's girlfriend
- Alex Jennings as Andrew Aldridge, a very conservative Member of Parliament, Maya's boss, and Tony 2's love interest. Jennings was originally cast as Charles in the 1994 film, before he was replaced by Hugh Grant due to production delays.
- Jamie Demetriou as Marcus, Maya's co-worker
- Dermot Mulroney as Bryce Dylan, Ainsley's recently divorced client and love interest

=== Guest ===
- Tom Mison as Quentin Thorpe-Blood, Gemma's wealthy husband
- Andie MacDowell as Mrs. Howard, Ainsley's mother. MacDowell played Carrie in the original 1994 film.
- Tommy Dewey as Ted Spencer, a New York-based senator who had an affair with Maya
- Ashley Madekwe as Julia, the mother of Craig's daughter Molly

== Episodes ==
| No. | Title | Directed by | Written by | Original release date |
|---|---|---|---|---|
| 1 | "Kash with a K" | Charles McDougall | Mindy Kaling & Matt Warburton | July 31, 2019 |
| 2 | "Hounslow" | Charles McDougall | Mindy Kaling & Tracey Wigfield | July 31, 2019 |
| 3 | "We Broke" | Tristram Shapeero | Matt Warburton | July 31, 2019 |
| 4 | "The Winner Takes It All" | Tristram Shapeero | Chris Schleicher | July 31, 2019 |
| 5 | "Love, Chalet" | Catherine Morshead | Charlie Grandy | August 7, 2019 |
| 6 | "Lights, Camera, Wedding" | Catherine Morshead | Lana Cho | August 14, 2019 |
| 7 | "The Sound of Music" | Tom Marshall | Abby Ajayi | August 21, 2019 |
| 8 | "Game Night" | Tom Marshall | Charlie Grandy & Bisha K. Ali | August 28, 2019 |
| 9 | "Four Friends and a Secret" | Catherine Morshead | Meredith Dawson | September 4, 2019 |
| 10 | "New Jersey" | Tristram Shapeero | Tracey Wigfield & Matt Warburton | September 11, 2019 |

== Production ==
=== Development ===
On November 1, 2017, it was announced that Hulu was developing an anthology television series adaptation of the film Four Weddings and a Funeral. Executive producers were set to include Mindy Kaling, Matt Warburton, Richard Curtis, Jonathan Prince, Tim Bevan, Eric Fellner, and Howard Klein. Production companies involved with the series were expected to consist of Working Title Films, 3 Arts Entertainment, MGM Television, and Universal Television. On May 2, 2018, it was announced that Hulu had given the production a series order.

On April 12, 2019, it was announced that the series would premiere on July 31, 2019.

=== Casting ===
On October 26, 2018, it was announced that Jessica Williams, Nikesh Patel, Rebecca Rittenhouse, and John Reynolds had been cast in starring roles. On November 21, 2018, it was reported that Williams' lead role of Jess had been reconceived into a new character named Maya and that Williams had been recast in the role by Nathalie Emmanuel. Additionally, it was further reported that Brandon Mychal Smith, Zoe Boyle, Harish Patel and Guz Khan had joined the cast and that Andie MacDowell would make a guest appearance in a nod to her starring role in the 1994 film, albeit not as her original character Carrie from the film. On December 7, 2018, it was announced that Tom Mison and Ashley Madekwe had been cast in recurring roles and that Tommy Dewey would make a guest appearance. In February 2019, Sophia La Porta joined the cast.

=== Filming ===
Principal photography for the series commenced on November 26, 2018, in London, England.

=== Music ===
The Four Weddings and a Funeral (Music from the Original TV Series) soundtrack was released on August 14, 2019 which consisted of a blend of cover versions and originals.

Four Weddings and a Funeral (Music From the Original TV Series)
| No. | Title | Artist(s) | Length |
|---|---|---|---|
| 1. | "For Once in My Life" | Emeli Sandé | 3:07 |
| 2. | "Heart of Glass" | Lily Moore | 3:10 |
| 3. | "Around the World" | Calum Scott | 2:16 |
| 4. | "Til Death Do Us Part" | James Smith | 3:34 |
| 5. | "Out Loud" | HRVY | 2:57 |
| 6. | "Holy Water" | Bishop Briggs | 3:08 |
| 7. | "I Only Want to Be with You" | LYRA | 2:52 |
| 8. | "Dheemi Dheemi (Ain't No Sunshine) ft. Vishal-Shekhar & Hussain Manawer" | Naughty Boy | 3:05 |
| 9. | "I Believe in a Thing Called Love" | Nina Nesbitt | 2:24 |
| 10. | "Won't Let Go" | Jamie N Commons | 3:41 |
| 11. | "New Kind of Love" | Skylar Grey | 3:17 |
| Total length: | | | 33:29 |

== Reception ==
On review aggregator Rotten Tomatoes, the series holds an approval rating of 42% based on 38 reviews, with an average rating of 5.59/10. The website's critical consensus reads, "Despite an impressive cast and crew, Four Weddings and a Funeral falls flat, relying too heavily on genre clichés to offer audiences anything more than just another mediocre romcom." On Metacritic, it has a weighted average score of 50 out of 100, based on 20 critics, indicating "mixed or average reviews".
