= 3 Arts Entertainment =

American film and television production company

- Logo used since 2026
- Formerly: 3 Arts Productions
- Type: Subsidiary
- Industry: Television production Film production
- Founded: 1991; 35 years ago
- Founders: Erwin Stoff; Michael Rotenberg; Howard Klein
- Headquarters: Beverly Hills, California, U.S.
- Key people: Erwin Stoff; Michael Rotenberg; Howard Klein
- Products: Motion pictures Television programs
- Parent: Lionsgate (majority; 2018–2024); Lionsgate Studios (majority; 2024–present)
- Website: www.3arts.com

3 Arts Entertainment, formerly 3 Arts Productions, is an American film and television production company founded in 1991 by Howard Klein and Erwin Stoff.

The company has gone on to produce television series such as King of the Hill, The Office (although uncredited), Everybody Hates Chris, Parks and Recreation, The Mindy Project, Brooklyn Nine-Nine, It's Always Sunny in Philadelphia, Unbreakable Kimmy Schmidt, American Vandal as well as produce feature films such as Edge of Tomorrow, Unbroken and 13 Hours: The Secret Soldiers of Benghazi. The first film that the company produced was the National Lampoon film Loaded Weapon 1, which was released on February 5, 1993.

The company was originally set up with a first-look deal at HBO Independent Productions for its television properties.

The company subsequently set up a deal with 20th Century Fox in 1993. In 1994, its television unit was transferred from HBO Independent Productions to 20th Television.

In 1996, 3 Arts made an alliance with CBS and Sony Pictures to launch 3 Arts Television which was dissolved by the end of the following year when it failed to produce any primetime television projects for the network. In 1999, 3 Arts Television was relaunched by NBC Studios executive David Bartis with a pact at Fox.

Managers Dave Becky, David Miner, Molly Madden and Nick Frenkel work at 3 Arts. In 2003, 3 Arts received a television deal at 20th Century Fox Television. In May 2018, Lionsgate acquired a majority stake in the company.

1992–2015

2016–2025

Former logos

== Controversy ==
On November 13, 2017, The Hollywood Reporter published that Pamela Adlon had fired Dave Becky after his client, Louis C.K., was accused by five women of sexual misconduct in a publication by The New York Times. In a publication by the Times, comedians Julia Wolov and Dana Min Goodman accused Becky of informing them through their managers not to speak about their experience of Louis C.K. exposing himself and masturbating in front of them after a show in 2002.

On June 23, 2020, following multiple sexual accusations, 3 Arts Entertainment ended their partnership with Chris D’Elia.

== Theatrical feature-length films ==
- Loaded Weapon 1 (1993)
- Excessive Force (1993)
- Son in Law (1993)
- In the Army Now (1994)
- Bio-Dome (1996)
- Chain Reaction (1996)
- Feeling Minnesota (1996)
- The Devil's Advocate (1997)
- Beverly Hills Ninja (1997)
- Picture Perfect (1997)
- Judas Kiss (1998)
- Girl, Interrupted (1999)
- The Matrix (1999)
- Austin Powers: The Spy Who Shagged Me (1999)
- Office Space (1999)
- Sweet November (2001)
- Down to Earth (2001)
- Pootie Tang (2001)
- Sol Goode (2001)
- Double Take (2001)
- Hardball (2001)
- Biker Boyz (2003)
- Head of State (2003)
- Stay (2005)
- Guess Who (2005)
- Constantine (2005)
- A Scanner Darkly (2006)
- Man About Town (2006)
- Totally Awesome (2006)
- First Snow (2006)
- The Lake House (2006)
- I Want Someone to Eat Cheese With (2006)
- I Am Legend (2007)
- Reign Over Me (2007)
- Purgatory (2008)
- Henry Poole Is Here (2008)
- The Onion Movie (2008)
- Street Kings (2008)
- The Day the Earth Stood Still (2008)
- The Blind Side (2009)
- Blood Creek (2009)
- Awaydays (2009)
- Extract (2009)
- The Extra Man (2010)
- Water for Elephants (2011)
- The Resident (2011)
- Kevin Hart: Laugh at My Pain (2011)
- Haunt (2013)
- Blue Caprice (2013)
- The To Do List (2013)
- Beautiful Creatures (2013)
- 47 Ronin (2013)
- Kevin Hart: Let Me Explain (2013)
- Edge of Tomorrow (2014)
- All the Wilderness (2014)
- Unbroken (2014)
- Perfect Sisters (2014)
- Burnt (2015)
- 13 Hours: The Secret Soldiers of Benghazi (2016)
- My Blind Brother (2016)
- Manhattan Night (2016)
- Holidays (2016)
- What Now? (2016)
- I Love You, Daddy (2017)
- Rough Night (2017)
- Blue Iguana (2018)
- An Actor Prepares (2018)
- Late Night (2019)
- Olympic Dreams (2019)
- Hala (2019)
- John Mulaney & the Sack Lunch Bunch (2019)
- The Call of the Wild (2020)
- The Lovebirds (2020)
- Chaos Walking (2021)
- Crush (2022)
- The Contractor (2022)
- Beavis and Butt-Head Do the Universe (2022)
- Old Dads (2023)
- American Fiction (2023)
- Suncoast (2024)
- Good Luck, Have Fun, Don't Die (2026)
- The Last House (2026)
- Love Language (TBA)

== Television series ==
=== 1990s ===
Title	Creator(s) / Developer(s)	Network	Original running	Notes
Down the Shore	Alan Kirschenbaum	Fox	1992–1993	with Caravan Entertainment and HBO Independent Productions
Daddy Dearest	Billy Van Zandt; Jane Milmore; Richard Dmitri; Richard Lewis	Fox	1993	with Van Zandt/Milmore Productions and HBO Independent Productions
Beavis and Butt-Head	Mike Judge	MTV/Paramount+/Comedy Central	1993–1997; 2011; 2022–present	with MTV Entertainment Studios, Judgemental Films, J. J. Sedelmaier Productions, Inc., Ternion Pictures (season 8), MTV Animation (seasons 1–8), Film Roman (season 8) and Titmouse, Inc. (season 9–)
King of the Hill	Mike Judge; Greg Daniels (d): Mike Judge; Greg Daniels; Saladin K. Patterson	Fox/Hulu	1997–2010; 2025–present	with Judgemental Films, Film Roman (seasons 1–13), Deedle-Dee Productions, Bandera Entertainment (seasons 14–), 20th Television, and 20th Television Animation
Pauly	Stan Zimmerman; James Berg	Fox	1997	with Zimmerman/Berg Productions, 20th Century Fox Television and Landing Patch Productions

=== 2000s ===
Title	Creator(s) / Developer(s)	Network	Original running	Notes
The Mind of the Married Man	Mike Binder	HBO	2001–2002	with Comedy Arts Studios, Sunlight Productions and HBO Entertainment
Carnivàle	Daniel Knauf	HBO	2003–2005	
American Candidate	R. J. Cutler	Showtime	2004	with Actual Reality Pictures
The Office	Ricky Gervais; Stephen Merchant (original series) (d): Greg Daniels	NBC	2005–2013	Uncredited with Deedle-Dee Productions, Shine America and Universal Television
It's Always Sunny in Philadelphia	Rob McElhenney (d): Rob McElhenney; Glenn Howerton	FX/FXX	2005–present	with RCG Productions and FX Productions
Everybody Hates Chris	Chris Rock; Ali LeRoi	UPN/The CW	2005–2009	with CR Enterprises, Inc., Paramount Network Television, CBS Paramount Network Television
The Chelsea Handler Show		E!	2006	Not to be confused with Chelsea Lately, Handler's later nightly talk show for E!
Lucky Louie	Louis C.K.	HBO	2006	with Circus King, Snowpants Productions, and HBO Entertainment
Human Giant	Aziz Ansari; Rob Huebel; Paul Scheer; Jason Woliner	MTV	2007–2008	
Carpoolers	Bruce McCulloch	ABC	2007–2008	with T.R.O.N.T., DreamWorks Television, and ABC Studios
The Starter Wife	Gigi Levangie	USA Network	2007	with Haypop Productions and McGibbon-Parriott Productions
The Starter Wife	Josann McGibbon; Sara Parriott	USA Network	2008	with McGibbon-Parriott Productions and Universal Cable Productions
D. L. Hughley Breaks the News		CNN	2008–2009	
Parks and Recreation	Greg Daniels; Michael Schur	NBC	2009–2015	with Open 4 Business Productions, Deedle-Dee Productions, Fremulon, and Universal Television
The Goode Family	Mike Judge; John Altschuler; Dave Krinsky	ABC	2009	with Ternion Pictures, and Media Rights Capital
Maneater		Lifetime	2009	with Sony Pictures Television
Kings	Michael Green	NBC	2009	with J.A. Green Construction Corp., and Universal Media Studios
Bored to Death	Jonathan Ames	HBO	2009–2011	with Dakota Pictures, Fair Harbor Productions, and HBO Entertainment

=== 2010s ===
Title	Network	Original running	Notes
Louie	FX	2010–2015	with Pig Newton, Inc. and FX Productions
Mario Lopez: Saved by the Baby	VH1	2010–2011	with 51 Minds Entertainment
Living Loaded	FX	2012	Never picked up to series
The Mindy Project	Fox	2012–2017	with Universal Television, Kaling International and Open 4 Business Productions
Real Husbands of Hollywood	BET	2013–2016	
Zach Stone Is Gonna Be Famous	MTV	2013	
Brooklyn Nine-Nine	Fox; NBC	2013–2021	with Universal Television, Fremulon and Dr. Goor Productions
Witches of East End	Lifetime	2013–2014	with Curly Girly Productions and Fox 21
Broad City	Comedy Central	2014–2019	with Paper Kite Productions, Jax Media and Comedy Partners
Silicon Valley	HBO	2014–2019	with HBO Entertainment, Judgmental Films, Altschuler Krinsky Works and Alec Berg Inc.
Saint George	FX	2014	with Lionsgate Television, Wind Dancer Films and Travieso Productions
Friends of the People	TruTV	2014–2015	with C-Moose Productions and Marobru Productions
Mulaney	Fox	2014–2015	with Universal Television, Broadway Video and Jurny Mulurny Television
Difficult People	Hulu	2015–2017	
Idiotsitter	Comedy Central	2015–2017	with Comedy Partners
Jessica Jones	Netflix	2015–2019	uncredited with Marvel Television, ABC Studios and Tall Girls Productions
Unbreakable Kimmy Schmidt	Netflix	2015–2020	with Universal Television, Little Stranger and Bevel Gears
Barely Famous	VH1	2015–2016	with Good Clean Fun
Why? with Hannibal Buress	Comedy Central	2015	with Comedy Partners
Mr. Robinson	NBC	2015	with Cullen Bros. Television and Universal Television
Master of None	Netflix	2015–2021	with Universal Television, Alan Yang Pictures, Oh Brudder Productions and Fremulon
Baskets	FX	2016–2017	Produced on Season 1–2 with FXP, Brillstein Entertainment Partners, Pig Newton, Inc. (seasons 1–2) and Billios
Lopez	TV Land	2016–2017	with Dakota Pictures, Travieso Productions and Altschuler Krinsky Works
Better Things	FX	2016–2017	Produced on Season 1–2 with FXP, Pig Newton, Inc. (seasons 1–2) and Slam Book, Inc.
Those Who Can't	TruTV		2016–2019
Comedy Knockout	TruTV	2016–2018	
Stan Against Evil	IFC	2016–2018	with RadicalMedia
Insecure	HBO	2016–2021	with HBO Entertainment, Hoorae Media and Penny for Your Thoughts Entertainment
The Good Place	NBC	2016–2020	with Fremulon and Universal Television
Man with a Plan	CBS	2016–2020	with Double Double Bonus Entertainment and CBS Television Studios
The Mick	Fox	2017–2018	with BingBangBoom Productions and 20th Century Fox Television
Great News	NBC	2017–2018	with Universal Television, Little Stranger, Bevel Gears and Big Wig Productions
Marlon	NBC	2017–2018	with Universal Television, Bicycle Path Productions and Baby Way Productions
Ghosted	Fox	2017–2018	with 20th Century Fox Television, Crowley Etten Productions, Afternoonnap, Additional Dialogue, TYPO Inc. and Gettin' Rad Productions
American Vandal	Netflix	2017–2018	with CBS Television Studios, Woodhead Entertainment, One Man Canoe and Funny or Die
The Comedy Get Down	BET	2017	
The Resident	Fox	2018–2023	with Fuqua Films, Nickels Productions, Up Island Films and 20th Television
Champions	NBC	2018	with Universal Television, Kaling International and Charlie Grandy Productions
Forever	Amazon Video	2018	
Happy Together	CBS	2018–2019	with CBS Television Studios, Fulwell 73, The Gary Breakfast Corporation and Page Entertainment
The Cool Kids	Fox	2018–2019	with 20th Century Fox Television, FX Productions, RCG Productions, Enrico Pallazzo and Nest Egg Productions
Making It	NBC	2018–2021	with Universal Television Alternative Studio and Paper Kite Productions
Russian Doll	Netflix	2019–2022	with Universal Television, Paper Kite Productions, Jax Media, Avenue A and Shoot to Midnight
Tacoma FD	TruTV	2019–2023	
A Black Lady Sketch Show	HBO	2019–2023	with HBO Entertainment, For Better or Words Inc., Hoorae Media and Jax Media
Abby's	NBC	2019	with Universal Television, Fremulon and Waila Inc. Productions
Four Weddings and a Funeral	Hulu	2019	with MGM Television, Universal Television, Kaling International and Philoment Media
Sunnyside	NBC/NBC app/NBC.com	2019	with Universal Television, Fremulon and Panther Co.

=== 2020s ===
Title	Network	Original running	Notes
Mythic Quest	Apple TV+	2020–2025	with RCG Productions, Ubisoft Film & Television and Lionsgate Television
Upload	Amazon Prime Video	2020–2025	with Amazon Studios, Baral Waley Productions and Reunion Pacific Entertainment
Duncanville	Fox	2020–2022	Uncredited with Bento Box Entertainment, Paper Kite Productions, Scullys, Universal Television, Fox Entertainment and 20th Television Animation
Space Force	Netflix	2020–2022	with Deedle-Dee Productions and Film Flam
Never Have I Ever	Netflix	2020–2023	with Universal Television, Kaling International and Original Langster
The Fugitive	Quibi	2020	with Thunder Road Films, Blackjack Films and Warner Bros. Television
The Duchess	Netflix	2020	with Clerkenwell Films
Mr. Mayor	NBC	2021–2022	with Little Stranger, Bevel Gears and Universal Television
Rutherford Falls	Peacock	2021–2022	with Fremulon, Pacific Electric Picture Company, and Universal Television
Ordinary Joe	NBC	2021–2022	with Friend & Lerner Productions, 6th & Idaho, Universal Television and 20th Television
Girls5eva	Peacock/Netflix	2021–2024	with Little Stranger, Bevel Gears, Scardino & Sons and Universal Television
Hacks	HBO Max	2021–2026	with Fremulon, Paulilu, First Thought Productions and Universal Television
Q-Force	Netflix	2021	with Fremulon, Hazy Mills Productions, Titmouse, Inc. and Universal Television
The Sex Lives of College Girls	HBO Max	2021–2025	with Kaling International and Warner Bros. Television
Baking It	Peacock	2021–2023	with Universal Television Alternative Studio and Paper Kite Productions
Players	Paramount+	2022	with CBS Studios, Riot Games, Brillstein Entertainment Partners and Funny or Die
101 Places to Party Before You Die	TruTV	2022	with Shed Media, High & Mighty Productions, Close Wolf, Inc. and Artists First
Sprung	Amazon Freevee	2022	with Amigos de Garcia Productions, Picrow and Amazon Studios
Loot	Apple TV+	2022–present	with Alan Yang Pictures, Normal Sauce, Animal Pictures, and Universal Television
Welcome to Wrexham	FX	2022–present	with Boardwalk Pictures, DN2 Productions, Maximum Effort, FX Productions and RCG Productions
Lopez vs Lopez	NBC	2022–2025	with Mi Vida Loba, Mohawk Productions, Travieso Productions and Universal Television
Primo	Amazon Freevee	2023	with Universal Television, Amazon Studios and Fremulon
High Desert	Apple TV+	2023	with Apple Studios, Red Hour Films, Delirious Media, Spoon Productions, My Fist Productions, Radish Pictures and Ook Eik Productions
Project Greenlight: A New Generation	Max	2023	with Hoorae Media, Miramax Television and Alfred Street Industries
Will Trent	ABC	2023–present	with Selfish Mermaid and 20th Television
Blue Eye Samurai	Netflix	2023–present	with Netflix Animation, Blue Spirit and J.A. Green Construction Corporation
Velma	HBO Max	2023–2024	with Charlie Grandy Productions, Kaling International and Warner Bros. Animation
Mulligan	Netflix	2023–2024	with Little Stranger, Bevel Gears, Means End Productions, Bento Box Entertainment and Universal Television
Everybody Still Hates Chris	Comedy Central/Paramount+	2024–2025	with Sanjay Shah Productions, CR Enterprises, Inc., Titmouse, Inc., CBS Eye Animation Productions and MTV Entertainment Studios
Manhunt	Apple TV+	2024	with POV Entertainment, Dovetale Productions, Monarch Pictures, Walden Media, Lionsgate Television and Apple Studios
Nobody Wants This	Netflix	2024–present	with Fatigue Sisters Productions, Levitan Productions, Mr. D Productions, Dunshire Productions and 20th Television
Running Point	Netflix	2025–present	with Kaling International, 23/34 Productions, The Fusion Media and Warner Bros. Television Studios
The Hunting Wives	Netflix	2025–present	with Lionsgate Television
The Paper	Peacock	2025–present	Uncredited with Deedle-Dee Productions, Banijay Americas and Universal Television
Side Quest	Apple TV+	2025	with RCG Productions, Ubisoft Film & Television and Lionsgate Television
Necaxa	Star / FXX	2025	with Hyphenate Media Group, More Better Productions, and Maximum Effort
Not Suitable for Work	Hulu	2026–present	with Kaling International, Charlie Grandy Productions and Warner Bros. Television Studios
Dang!	Netflix	2026–present	with Rodeoscope, Panther Co., Fremulon, Titmouse, Inc., Alan Yang Pictures and Universal Television
Expecting	Peacock	TBA	with Kaling International and Warner Bros. Television
