= Running Point =

2025 American sports comedy television series

- Genre: Sports comedy
- Created by: Elaine Ko and Mindy Kaling & Ike Barinholtz & David Stassen
- Showrunner: David Stassen
- Starring: Kate Hudson; Drew Tarver; Scott MacArthur; Brenda Song; Fabrizio Guido; Chet Hanks; Toby Sandeman; Uche Agada; Justin Theroux; Max Greenfield
- Narrated by: Kate Hudson
- Music by: Joseph Stephens; Siddhartha Khosla; Alan DeMoss
- Country of origin: United States
- Original language: English
- No. of seasons: 2
- No. of episodes: 20

Production
- Executive producers: Mindy Kaling; Ike Barinholtz; David Stassen; Howard Klein; Jeanie Buss; Linda Rambis; Michael Weaver; Kate Hudson; James Ponsoldt
- Producers: Erin Owens; Missy Mansour
- Cinematography: Marco Fargnoli
- Editors: Mat Greenleaf; Diana Fishman; Kelsey Myers; Torrie Goedtel
- Running time: 26–33 minutes
- Production companies: Kaling International; 23/34 Productions; 3 Arts Entertainment; Warner Bros. Television Studios

Original release
- Network: Netflix
- Release: February 27, 2025 – present

Running Point is an American sports comedy television series created by Elaine Ko, Mindy Kaling, Ike Barinholtz, and David Stassen, and starring Kate Hudson. The series premiered on Netflix on February 27, 2025. In March 2025, the series was renewed for a second season which premiered on April 23, 2026. On May 13, 2026, the show was renewed for a third season.

== Premise ==
Isla Gordon, a reformed party girl, gets the shot of a lifetime to prove herself as she is left in charge of her family's pro basketball team, but she soon learns that running a basketball team comes with its own set of challenges both on and off the court.

== Cast and characters ==
=== Main ===
- Kate Hudson as Isla Gordon, a college drop-out who is the former coordinator of charitable endeavors who became the president of the Los Angeles Waves when her brother Cam was forced to step down
- Drew Tarver as Sandy Gordon, Isla's younger half-brother, chief financial officer of the Waves, and a Stanford graduate
- Scott MacArthur as Ness Gordon, Isla's older brother and general manager of the Waves
- Brenda Song as Ali Lee, Isla's college roommate, best friend, and chief of staff for the Waves
- Fabrizio Guido as Jackie Moreno, the younger half-brother recently discovered by the Gordon siblings
- Chet Hanks as Travis Bugg, the problematic point guard of the Waves
- Toby Sandeman as Marcus Winfield, the long-time star player of the Waves
- Uche Agada as Dyson Gibbs (season 2; recurring season 1), the rookie player of the Waves who was drafted from the D-League
- Justin Theroux as Cam Gordon (season 2; recurring season 1), Isla's eldest brother who stepped down as the president of the Waves due to a drug addiction and mandatory rehab. He named Isla as his successor.

=== Recurring ===
- Jay Ellis as Jay Brown, the head coach of the Waves, then he became the coach for the Boston team. Later, Isla's love interest
- Max Greenfield as Lev Levenson, Isla's fiancé who is a pediatrician
- Dane DiLiegro as Badrag Knauss, a Waves player from Slovenia
- Jon Glaser as Sean Murphy, a popular sports podcaster
- Roberto Sanchez as Stephen Ramirez, the chairman of the board of the Waves
- Scott Evans as Charlie, Sandy's boyfriend who is a dog groomer
- Marissa Reyes as Sofia, captain of the Waves dance team, later Jackie’s love interest
- Ray Romano as Norm Stinson (season 2), Jay's mentor and Waves' new head coach
- Ken Marino as Al Fleischman (season 2), a wealthy Waves season ticket holder and the "Toilet King of Orange County"
- Tommy Dewey as Magnus (season 2), the general manager of Toronto Trappers who is known as "The Poacher"
- Richa Moorjani as Aruna (season 2), the Waves' star accountant
- Jake Picking as Tommy White (season 2), the new point guard of the Waves and Sandy's new love interest
- Blake Anderson as Leroy (season 2)
- Duby Maduegbunam as Benson (season 2)
- Aliyah Turner as Zoé Debay (season 2), an actress and television star who was Travis' brief girlfriend and later, Dyson's girlfriend

=== Guest ===
- Keyla Monterroso Mejia as Ana Moreno, Jackie's cousin who is a lawyer
- Jessalyn Wanlim as Bituin, Ness' wife
- Andy Favreau as Charles Tracey, the owner of the Boston team
- Utkarsh Ambudkar as Malkeet Dasari, the owner of the San Francisco team
- Jim O'Heir as Irv Plotkin, the owner of the Chicago team
- Peter Allas as Frank Schaughnessy, the owner of the New York team
- Nicole Sullivan as Bonnie Bugg, Travis' mother
- Diedrich Bader as Assistant Coach Tony Spagnoli
- Rebecca Rittenhouse as Olivia Anne, Jay's ex-wife
- Ryan Caltagirone as Marcel, Olivia Anne's new husband
- Phil Reeves as the league's Commissioner
- Law Roach as the stylist for Isla
- Lisa Rinna as herself, starring in the reality show that Charlie had a role in (season 2)
- Stella Everett as Brielle, a WNBA baller and Travis' girlfriend (season 2)
- Octavia Spencer as Diane Robichaux, attorney (season 2)
- Nicole Richie as Nicole Vark, Isla's friend from college (season 2)
- Adam DiMarco as Danny Pierce (season 2), a basketball coach LA Waves tries to poach
- Macaulay Culkin as a fan (season 2)
- Scott Speedman as Luke McShay (season 2), the owner of hockey team LA Raptors and rival of Isla's
- Oliver Hudson as Oliver McShay (season 2), brother of Luke McShay

== Episodes ==
=== Series overview ===
Season	Episodes	Originally released
1	10	February 27, 2025
2	10	April 23, 2026

=== Season 1 (2025) ===
No. overall	No. in season	Title	Directed by	Written by	Original release date	Prod. code
1	1	"Pilot"	James Ponsoldt	Teleplay by : Mindy Kaling & Ike Barinholtz & David Stassen; Story by : Elaine Ko and Mindy Kaling & Ike Barinholtz & David Stassen	February 27, 2025	T12.18101
Despite her passion for the sport, Isla Gordon was frequently ignored by her father, Jack, the former owner of the pro basketball team the Los Angeles Waves, as well as her brothers who are also in the family business. This led her to a rebellious lifestyle before she became the team's coordinator of charitable endeavors. After her brother Cam is forced to step down as president of the team to recover from drug abuse, he names Isla as his successor. As one of her first tasks, her brothers Ness and Sandy encourage her to trade their problematic point guard, Travis Bugg, in exchange for cap space and to tank their season since they were off to a rough start. After being warned by the chairman, Stephen Ramirez, that entering a rebuild and trading Travis could lead to her dismissal, she makes some calls and deals with other owners to increase their cap space, keep Travis, and bring in a new rookie from the D-League. Meanwhile, Jackie Moreno, a young fan who works concessions at the games, discovers that he is Jack's illegitimate son following his mother's death.
2	2	"Joe Pesci"	James Ponsoldt	Mindy Kaling	February 27, 2025	T12.18102
Isla and Ali are forced to search for a new sponsor for the team after learning the previous one, Snoozepedic, is pulling out following news of Cam's drug abuse. Ness and Sandy encourage the board of directors to initiate a vote of no confidence to remove Isla as president so they can take over. While shopping at Sephora, Isla gets an idea after seeing a female Waves fan to have them become the new sponsor. She interrupts the board meeting to reveal she has secured the sponsorship, which will get 20 percent more than their previous one, forcing Ness and Sandy to give up their takeover attempt. The family learns about Jackie being Jack's son from their lawyer. Though Cam and Jackie's cousin Ana encourage a settlement, Jackie's desire to be with his new family moves Isla and Ness and they agree to spend more time with him.
3	3	"The Travis Bugg Affair"	Michael Weaver	Ike Barinholtz & David Stassen	February 27, 2025	T12.18103
As Isla hires Jackie as her new assistant, she is forced into damage control after learning Travis posted a video of himself vandalizing his jersey to insult Sephora. She takes Travis out to dinner to politely ask him to issue a public apology, but he mistakes it for a date and attempts to kiss her, leading the public to question if she is having an affair with him. She suspends him for a week, leading to another loss for the team. Realizing he will respond better to team leadership, she has Marcus visit Travis to remind him of the effect his behavior will have on his career, leading him to apologize and to dispel the affair rumors. Jackie is initially overwhelmed by his new responsibility as an assistant, but is mentored by Ali to understand his half-sister better.
4	4	"Doljanchi"	Michael Weaver	Grace Edwards	February 27, 2025	T12.18104
Isla attends a Leagues owner conference in Phoenix where she and the owners for the three largest teams in the league plan to take part in a new streaming service named Hoopli that only features their games. After learning from Boston's team owner that it will hurt the underfunded leagues and will only be a temporary success, she negotiates a new deal for the rest of the teams before attending the doljanchi for Ali's child. The next day, she finds out Boston took her place in the Hoopli deal. Meanwhile, Ness moves in with Sandy after Bituin kicks him out of the house. Sandy fakes having COVID-19 to his boyfriend Charlie to avoid him coming over. After getting quickly annoyed with Ness, Sandy learns from Bituin that she does not like his family business interfering in their personal time, leading the couple to reconcile. Meanwhile, Charlie goes to Sandy's house and meets Ness. He becomes upset after learning Sandy has not mentioned him to his family. Dyson is worried about the team's tradition of rookies paying for their expensive dinners with his lower salary, but Marcus volunteers to pay for him and ends the tradition.
5	5	"Beshert"	Thembi Banks	Joe Mande	February 27, 2025	T12.18105
As her engagement party approaches, Isla becomes nervous upon realizing her fiancé Lev wants her to convert to Judaism. Despite her father's will threatening to take her out of the family business if she converts, Isla still wants to for the sake of her marriage. Jackie proposes having Chinese performer Red Panda instead of the usual dance team to make the halftime shows more entertaining. Sandy rejects it, but Ness accepts it. Despite upsetting the dance team, Red Panda's performance wins the audience over. At the engagement party, Isla talks to Jay about her concerns marrying Lev while Charlie breaks up with Sandy after learning from Ness he lied to him again. Sandy angrily confronts Ness over his actions, leading to a brawl between them and Isla in the pool. As they dry off, Lev tells Isla she does not have to convert for him so they can start their marriage off on a good note before the siblings reconcile over Sandy's breakup.
6	6	"The Yips"	Thembi Banks	Akshara Sekar	February 27, 2025	T12.18106
With Dyson's free throws holding the team back, Isla and Ali hire the instructor for the Indian National Women's team to help him. She encourages him to use the granny shot, but he is embarrassed to do it in front of his teammates and the fans. As Isla refuses her brothers' suggestion to trade Marcus to rebuild the team, sports talk show host Sean Murphy is leaked information about the Waves trading Marcus, leading him to avoid practice. Isla initially accuses Sandy and Ness of leaking the rumor before angrily confronting Sean during a televised interview with Chris Evert. Jackie goes on a date with the captain of the dance team, Sofia. While the two hit it off, he upsets her when he sleeps with an influencer shortly afterwards. Marcus agrees to play after watching Isla's confrontation with Sean, and he helps Dyson become more comfortable with granny shots, leading the team to finally win after a losing streak. Isla reconciles with her brothers after realizing neither of them leaked the rumor. Unbeknownst to the siblings, Cam is the leaker.
7	7	"A Special Place in Hell"	Michael Weaver	Brandon Childs	February 27, 2025	T12.18107
Isla is asked to deal with Travis's overbearing mother, Bonnie, who has moved from Florida to California and disrupts the practice courts to monitor her son. After seemingly getting her to leave, Bonnie returns the next day to ask Isla for a job, which she leaves to Ali to figure out. Sandy is having a difficult time moving on from his breakup with Charlie. While having dinner with Ness, he finds that Charlie has begun dating his personal trainer. Jackie discovers that he has chlamydia and informs every woman he has recently had sex with. Ramirez is enraged upon learning his daughter was infected by Jackie and wants him fired. Taking Isla's advice, Jackie apologizes to him and promises to stay away from his daughter. Bonnie further disrupts the work environment by gathering a camera crew to pitch a reality show, and she punches Isla after the latter kicks her out. Travis thanks Isla for removing his mother from the facility before taking extra medication for his knee.
8	8	"The Streak"	Michael Weaver	Michael Rodriguez	February 27, 2025	T12.18108
After a win-streak, the Waves are one game away from going to the playoffs. However, their chances are put at risk after Jay has an altercation at a nightclub with his ex-wife's husband and refuses to issue a public apology. Isla has Assistant Coach Tony step up after his suspension, but he proves to be unqualified for the job. She also learns from Charles that Jay is interested in coaching for Boston despite his three-year contract in LA. Marcus and Dyson discover that Travis is suffering from drug abuse. Encouraged by Ness to move on from Charlie, Sandy invites a man he met on Grindr into his home for sex, but the man locks him in his shower and robs him. Isla rescues him and encourages him to win Charlie back. She then goes to Jay's house and learns from his ex-wife that she and her husband are taking their children to Boston, which led to Jay's outburst. Isla restructures Jay's contract so that he can move to Boston after finishing the season, and he apologizes and rejoins the Waves in time to lead them to the playoffs. Cam becomes irritated over Isla's success with the team and tries to pay off the rehab facility to be released early.
9	9	"The Playoffs"	David Stassen	Michael Chung & Bronson Diallo	February 27, 2025	T12.18109
Isla learns of Travis' drug addiction and decides to have him continue to play and commit him to rehab afterwards, angering Marcus. After talking with Ness about playing through an injury and Sean over her approach with the players, she begins to reconsider. As Sandy learns that Charlie is single, Jackie encourages him to win Charlie back with a grand, romantic gesture. He has Jackie bring Charlie to the playoff game, where he professes his love for him and performs Taylor Swift's "Love Story" in front of the audience, ultimately winning him over and bringing them together again. Isla finds Travis high at his apartment and drives him to rehab, which causes her to miss a ceremony where Lev received a prestigious pediatrician award she promised to attend. Despite Travis' absence, Marcus is glad Isla put his safety first and leads the Waves to win their first playoff game. Lev, believing Isla is prioritizing her work and taking him for granted, ends their relationship.
10	10	"Game Seven"	David Stassen	Mindy Kaling and Ike Barinholtz & David Stassen	February 27, 2025	T12.18110
One month later, the Waves are one win away from going to the championship, and Isla is asked to deliver a pre-game locker room speech. She learns that Lev is planning to move to Minnesota and attempts to convince him to give her a second chance, and he tells her he will need time to consider it. Jackie attempts to inform his siblings about something important, but they are too preoccupied with the playoffs and their personal lives. When he suddenly disappears at work, they learn from Sofia that he is celebrating his late mother's birthday alone at a restaurant. They meet him there to apologize and vow to act more like a proper family to him. They are forced to run to the stadium to make it to the game, where Isla pumps up the team with a John Wick-inspired speech. While the Waves perform well against Portland, they ultimately lose when a player on the other team makes a miraculous half-court shot. While reflecting on the game and the season, Isla and Jay share a kiss, but are unsure what to make of it. The next day, Isla finds Cam back in the office, intent on retaking his position.

=== Season 2 (2026) ===
No. overall	No. in season	Title	Directed by	Written by	Original release date	Prod. code
11	1	"New Coach Who Dis"	David Stassen	Mindy Kaling & Ike Barinholtz & David Stassen	April 23, 2026	T12.19201
With Cam back, Isla has her guard up around him. Isla has gotten back together with Lev and is planning their wedding. As the Waves are in need of a new coach, Cam tries to bring in popular coach Danny Pierce, hoping to gain the credit for a successful playoffs run. However, Isla has the last word, and reaches out to former Waves coach Norm Stinson. Norm bombs the interview but leaves behind a notebook of strategies that impress Isla, leading to him being hired. Upon seeing Dyson flirting with Travis' new girlfriend Zoé, Marcus reminds him of the pecking order on the team. At the urging of Marcus' agent, Dyson holds out for a new contract. Ali asks Isla for a raise, but Isla is too distracted to ask.
12	2	"The Poacher"	Erica Oyama	Joe Mande	April 23, 2026	T12.19202
Despite Isla's requests, Sandy denies Dyson's and Ali's raises as the Waves are in the red. Sandy learns that Cam embezzled funds and forged Sandy's signature to check out of rehab; unbeknownst to the family, Cam is not sober. Charlie loses his job and decides to reattempt an acting career; Sandy connects him with an agent. Dyson, now seeing Zoé, agrees to stay with the team after Isla resolves to stop treating him like a charity case. Cam agrees to help Al, a wealthy season ticket holder, get center court seats. An agent known for moving players to Toronto known as the "Poacher" arrives in Los Angeles, but is revealed to be courting Ali, not Dyson.
13	3	"Triangle of Badness"	David Stassen	David Phillips	April 23, 2026	T12.19203
Ali's move to Canada creates a big rift between her and Isla. The love triangle between Dyson and Travis over Zoé begins affecting the team dynamic and performance on the court. Isla allows controversial WNBA player Brielle Mande to practice at the facility; the similarities between her and Travis become apparent and the beef is seemingly squashed. Meanwhile, Sandy tries to cater to Charlie's new reality TV show lifestyle.
14	4	"MVP: Marcus Very Pissed"	Michael Weaver	Ike Barinholtz & David Stassen	April 23, 2026	T12.19204
Cam seeds tension between Norm and Marcus that Isla fails to placate, causing a string of losses. Isla advises Norm to make Marcus feel valued; Norm injures himself defending Marcus from a foul, impressing Marcus and ending the team's losing streak. Meanwhile, Charlie's new reality show continues to encroach on Sandy's home, and Sandy breaks up with him. Ali begins to regret moving to Toronto, and agrees to return to Los Angeles with Isla in time for her wedding.
15	5	"Rehearsal Dinner"	Michael Weaver	Akshara Sekar	April 23, 2026	T12.19205
A few days before Isla and Lev's wedding, they come into conflict because the prenup purposefully heavily restricts Lev to prevent the team falling out of family control. Jay arrives for a game against Boston, unsettling Isla. Ness is charged with bringing on Tommy White, a promising player who would replace Travis as starting point guard. At the rehearsal dinner, Lev tells Isla he has signed the prenup, and Ness announces that he has successfully signed Tommy after cleverly manipulating the other teams involved. Later that night, Isla gently tells Lev she cannot marry him.
16	6	"The Strike"	Michael Weaver	Mindy Kaling	April 23, 2026	T12.19206
While recovering from the end of her engagement, Isla shepherds Tommy's arrival in Los Angeles. Sofia exposes the dancers' poor working conditions on TikTok, and Isla wishes to help them as Lev had accused her of being a bad person. After she offers token benefits, the dancers go on strike and hire Diane Robicheaux, a famous lawyer. Diane shows Isla Sofia working at a nursing home and explains that many of the girls need to work second jobs. Isla gives the girls a raise, health insurance, and a new dressing room. She meets with Lev and apologizes for the way things ended between them. Meanwhile, Ali oversees Tommy's housing search and tries to discover if he is gay; the question is answered when Tommy kisses Sandy.
17	7	"We are Broke"	Michael Weaver	David Phillips	April 23, 2026	T12.19207
The stadium ceiling collapses in the middle of a game, bringing the Waves' financial woes to the forefront as they cannot afford the extensive repairs. Cam decides to spend time with Jackie. Nicole Vark, Isla's school acquaintance who inherited her family's pharmaceutical company, agrees to fund the repairs in exchange for promoting a new GERD drug, but because the gastrointestinal side effects need to be listed on the court floor, Isla is forced to accept Al's money. Cam apologizes for going behind Isla's back regarding Al; the stadium is fixed with a new court named after Jack Gordon. Sandy becomes overwhelmed by his new fling with Tommy, but Ali encourages him to maintain it as not to affect Tommy's performance.
18	8	"Gordons vs. McShays"	Erica Oyama	Akshara Sekar	April 23, 2026	T12.19208
The Waves have attained top seed, while Isla considers reconnecting with Jay, who is briefly visiting Los Angeles. The McShays, owners of a local hockey team, want to break their lease at the Waves' arena. Isla challenges Luke McShay to a five-on-five basketball game between the families, with the McShays staying at the arena if they lose. With Jackie injured after falsifying Cam's urine test, the Gordons enlist their unlikable cousin Bennie as a player and Jay as their coach. The Gordons narrowly win thanks to a buzzer-beater from Isla. Isla and Jay later sleep together. The next day, Isla learns that Al has bought out several shareholders (including Stephen). He and Cam now control the board, and plan to reinstate Cam as president.
19	9	"Et tu, Cam?"	David Stassen	David Phillips & Talia Adaiah Caldwell	April 23, 2026	T12.19209
Isla tries to find someone to outbid Al for Stephen's shares so she can keep her job. Cam strongarms Ness and Sandy out of acting against him. Meanwhile, Zoé dumps Dyson, causing the Waves to lose game 1 of the playoffs. Dyson tries and fails to win Zoé back. Cam offers Jackie a promotion. Having failed to secure a financier, Isla considers selling her shares to Al—which would make him majority shareholder—on the condition that he keep her on as president. However, she changes her mind to keep the business in the family. She gives Dyson a pep talk and the team wins game 2. Ness, Sandy, and Jackie approach Isla with a plan to keep her in charge.
20	10	"Chicago-Style"	David Stassen	Ike Barinholtz & David Stassen	April 23, 2026	T12.19210
The board is informed about Cam's embezzlement and drug addiction, stopping his coup and ousting him from the business. The playoff finals are between Boston and LA, letting Isla and Jay see each other in person. It is revealed that Marcus has been playing on a partial meniscus tear, and Isla bans him from playing until he recovers. Sandy is paranoid about the lead accountant, Aruna, knowing of his role in the embezzlement. After Ali finds out about Isla and Jay, Isla pauses the relationship and runs into Luke again. Marcus appears in the middle of game 7, leading the team to win the series. In the ensuing celebration, he tells Isla he is retiring. Instead of spending the summer with Sofia in Washington, D.C., Jackie elects to join Ness and Ali on the scouting trip to Europe. The next morning, the siblings learn that Cam and Al have bought another LA basketball franchise to rival the Waves, with Jay as coach.

== Production ==
=== Development ===
In June 2021, it was announced that Netflix had given a straight-to-series order to an untitled Los Angeles Lakers themed comedy series created by Mindy Kaling. The Los Angeles Lakers controlling owner and president, Jeanie Buss, would co-executive produce the series with Kaling. The series was initially going to be written, executive produced, and showrun by Elaine Ko. The series was developed as a workplace comedy inspired by the personal and professional relationships between the Los Angeles Lakers family owners and office team.

In January 2024, it was reported that the series had a new creative team, with Ko leaving the series, and Kaling now co-writing and executive producing the series with Ike Barinholtz and David Stassen. Stassen will also serve as the series showrunner. In May 2024, the untitled series was given the name, Running Point. The series is executive produced by Mindy Kaling, Ike Barinholtz, David Stassen, Jeanie Buss, Linda Rambis, Howard Klein, and Kate Hudson, and produced by Jordan Rambis. Production companies involved with the series are Kaling's Kaling International, 3 Arts Entertainment, and Warner Bros. Television Studios. In March 2025, Netflix renewed the series for a second season. Netflix renewed the series for a third season in May 2026.

=== Casting ===
In January 2024, it was announced that Kate Hudson had joined the series as the protagonist, Isla Gordon, and also as an executive producer. In February 2024, it was announced that Brenda Song had joined the series as Ali Lee, Drew Tarver as Sandy Gordon, and Scott MacArthur as Ness Gordon. Also in February 2024, it was announced that Chet Hanks had joined the series as Travis Bugg, Keyla Monterroso Mejia as Ana Moreno, Fabrizio Guido as Jackie Moreno, Toby Sandeman as Marcus Winfield, and Roberto Sanchez as Stephen Ramirez.

In March 2024, it was announced that Max Greenfield had joined the series as Lev Levenson, Dane DiLiegro as Badrag Knauss, and Uche Agada as Dyson Gibbs. In May 2024, Jay Ellis joined the series as Jay Brown. In June 2024, Scott Evans joined the series as Charlie. In September 2025, it was reported that Robert Townsend was cast as Norm Stinson, Ken Marino as Al Fleischman, Tommy Dewey as Magnus, Richa Moorjani as Aruna, Jake Picking as Tommy White, Blake Anderson as Leroy, Duby Maduegbunam as Benson, and Aliyah Turner as Zoé Debay while Justin Theroux and Uche Agada were promoted as series regulars for the second season. In October 2025, Ray Romano joined the cast in a recasting, replacing Townsend.

=== Filming ===
The series began filming in February 2024, in Los Angeles. The outside of the Los Angeles Waves basketball stadium is the OVO Hydro in Glasgow, Scotland. During filming, Song's husband Macaulay Culkin visited the set and decided to cameo in the background. As the script had a heckler character, Culkin was invited to play him.

=== Legal matter ===
In February 2025, Pepperdine University sued Netflix and Warner Bros. Discovery for alleged trademark infringement. The university claimed that the TV series used their team's logo, the Waves. Pepperdine University also accused Running Point for the use of their "basketball team's colors, orange and blue", highlighting the number 37 of a fictional player (number 37 also being synonymous to Pepperdine athletics), in addition to other similarities.

== Release ==
Running Point was released on Netflix on February 27, 2025. The second season premiered on April 23, 2026.

== Reception ==
=== Critical response ===
Critical response of Running Point
Season	Rotten Tomatoes	Metacritic
1	79% (53 reviews)	64 (25 reviews)
2	90% (10 reviews)	66 (4 reviews)

For the first season, the review aggregator website Rotten Tomatoes reported a 79% approval rating based on 53 critic reviews. The website's critics consensus reads, "Kate Hudson continuously makes three-pointer shots with her dynamite charisma in Running Point, carrying this amusing series while it straightens out its game strategy." Metacritic, which uses a weighted average, assigned a score of 64 out of 100 based on 25 critics, indicating "generally favorable" reviews.

The second season has an 90% approval rating on Rotten Tomatoes, based on 10 critic reviews. On Metacritic, it has a weighted average score of 66 out of 100 based on 4 critics, indicating "generally favorable reviews".

=== Viewership ===
According to data from Showlabs, Running Point ranked first on Netflix in the United States during the week of March 3–9, 2025.
