= Kaling International =

American film and television production company

Kaling International, Inc.
- Type: Private
- Industry: Production company
- Founded: 2012; 14 years ago
- Founder: Mindy Kaling
- Headquarters: Warner Bros. Studios Burbank, Burbank, California, U.S.
- Key people: Mindy Kaling (CEO); Jessica Kumai Scott (President)
- Owner: Mindy Kaling
- Number of employees: 4 (2022)
- Website: kalinginternational.com

Kaling International, Inc. is an American film and television production company founded by Mindy Kaling. It is known for producing the television series The Mindy Project (2012–2017), Never Have I Ever (2020–2023), and The Sex Lives of College Girls (2021–2025).

== History ==
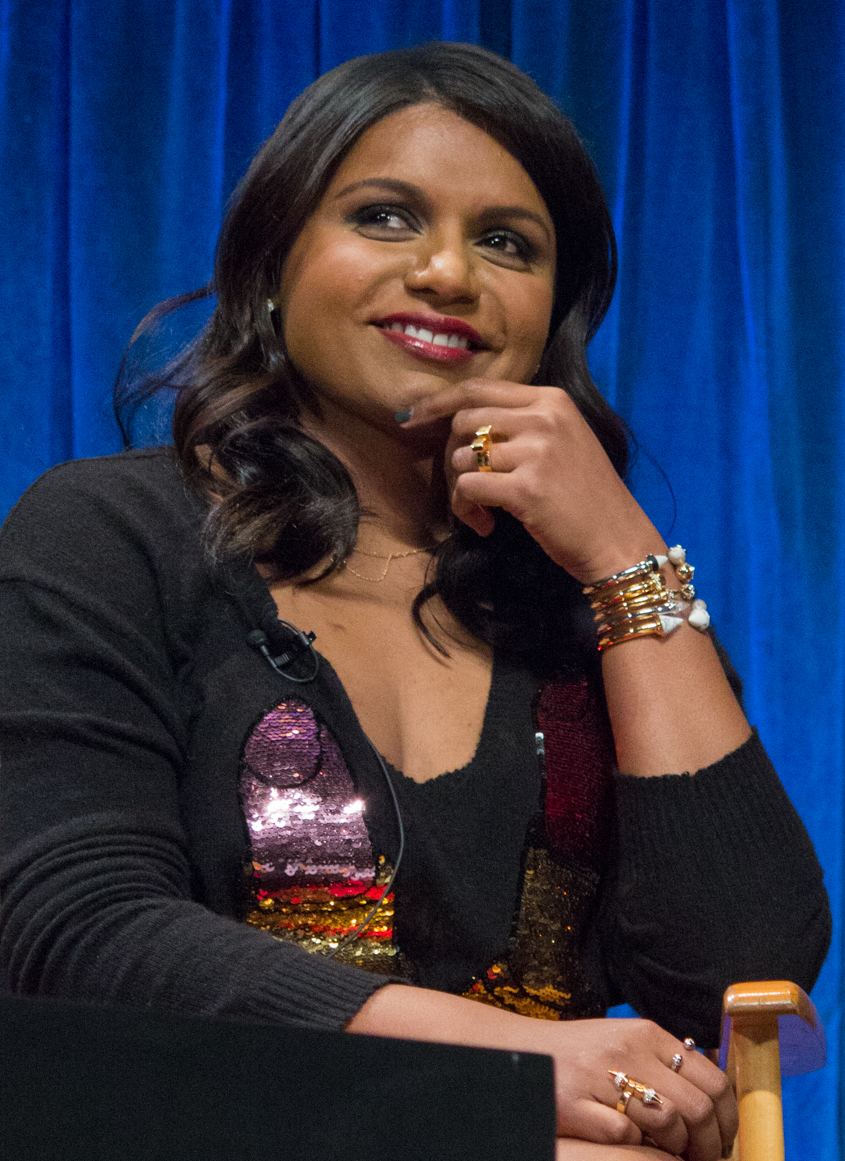
The company's founder Mindy Kaling in 2013

The production company was founded by American actress, comedian, screenwriter, and producer Mindy Kaling in 2012, with the aim of developing projects centered on the inner lives of women of color, a perspective she had described as historically underrepresented on television. Kaling founded the company while she was under a long-term deal at Universal Television.

In February 2019, the company entered a six-year overall deal with Warner Bros. Television Group, worth an estimated US$8.5 million a year. In October 2019, Jessica Kumai Scott joined the company as president. Before joining the company, Scott was previously director of content development at Hulu.

Since June 2020, the company had been headquartered inside the Warner Bros. Studios Burbank lot in Burbank, California. As of March 2022, the company employs four people: Kaling, Kaling's producing partner and company president Jessica Kumai Scott, and their two assistants.

In January 2025, the company renewed its overall deal with Warner Bros. Television Group, entering a new multi-year overall deal.

== Filmography ==
=== Television ===
Year	Title	Network	Notes	Ref.
2012–2017	The Mindy Project	FOX, Hulu	with Open 4 Business Productions, 3 Arts Entertainment, and Universal Television	
2018	Champions	NBC	with Charlie Grandy Productions, 3 Arts Entertainment, and Universal Television	
2019	Four Weddings and a Funeral	Hulu	with Philoment Media, 3 Arts Entertainment, MGM Television, and Universal Television	
2020–2023	Never Have I Ever	Netflix	with Original Langster, 3 Arts Entertainment, and Universal Television	
2021–2025	The Sex Lives of College Girls	Max	with 3 Arts Entertainment and Warner Bros. Television Studios	
2023–2024	Velma	Max	with Charlie Grandy Productions, 3 Arts Entertainment, and Warner Bros. Animation	
2025–present	Running Point	Netflix	with 23/34 Productions, 3 Arts Entertainment, and Warner Bros. Television Studios	
2026	Not Suitable for Work	Hulu	with Charlie Grandy Productions, 3 Arts Entertainment, and Warner Bros. Television Studios	

==== In development ====
- House of Kyle (with 3 Arts Entertainment and Warner Bros. Television Studios)
- Vera Wong's Unsolicited Advice for Murderers (with Warner Bros. Television Studios)
- Zarna (with Hartbeat, 3 Arts Entertainment, and Warner Bros. Television Studios)

=== Film ===
Year	Title	Director	Gross (worldwide)	Notes	Ref.
2019	Late Night	Nisha Ganatra	$22.4 million	with FilmNation Entertainment, 30West, Imperative Entertainment, and 3 Arts Entertainment	
2022	To Kill a Tiger	Nisha Pahuja	—N/a	with National Film Board of Canada, Notice Pictures, AC Films Inc, Minor Realm, ShivHans Pictures, Equality Now, and Surgo Foundation	
2025	A Nice Indian Boy	Roshan Sethi	$902,453	with Levantine Films, Wayfarer Studios, and Scythia Films	

==== In development ====
- Untitled Mindy Kaling Animated Comedy (with Paramount Animation)
