= Champions (American TV series) =

American comedy television series

- Genre: Sitcom
- Created by: Charlie Grandy; Mindy Kaling
- Starring: Anders Holm; Fortune Feimster; Andy Favreau; Josie Totah (Note: Credited as J. J. Totah; she presented as male during the production of the show but came out as a transgender woman after the show was canceled in late 2018.); Mouzam Makkar
- Composer: Jesse Novak
- Country of origin: United States
- Original language: English
- No. of seasons: 1
- No. of episodes: 10

Production
- Executive producers: Mindy Kaling; Charlie Grandy; Howard Klein; Michael Spiller; Matt Warburton
- Producers: Anders Holm; Lorie Zerweck
- Cinematography: Charles Papert; Brian Burgoyne; Marco Fargnoli
- Editors: Rob Burnett; Mat Greenleaf; Jessica Sisk
- Camera setup: Single-camera
- Running time: 21 minutes
- Production companies: Kaling International; Charlie Grandy Productions; 3 Arts Entertainment; Universal Television

Original release
- Network: NBC
- Release: March 8 – May 25, 2018

Champions is an American television sitcom created by Charlie Grandy and Mindy Kaling that aired on NBC from March 8 to May 25, 2018. The series stars Anders Holm, Fortune Feimster, Andy Favreau, Josie Totah, and Mouzam Makkar.

On June 29, 2018, NBC canceled the series after one season.

== Premise ==
Vince, a charismatic gym owner, is living every bachelor's dream with his younger brother Matthew in Brooklyn, New York. He lives a simple life, dates an endless string of women, until his high school fling Priya drops off their 15-year-old son Michael.

== Cast and characters ==
=== Main ===
- Anders Holm as Vincent "Vince" Cook, a gym owner living in Brooklyn, New York with his brother Matthew, until Priya, his ex girlfriend, drops Michael (his son) off to live with him.
- Fortune Feimster as Ruby, Vince and Matthew's childhood friend and a trainer at the gym.
- Andy Favreau as Matthew Cook, Vince's younger brother, who is absent-minded most times.
- Josie Totah as Michael Prashant Patel, a talented and ambitious theater-kid, Vince's son, and Matthew's nephew.
- Mouzam Makkar as Britney, Vince's on-again, off-again girlfriend and a trainer at the gym.

=== Recurring ===
- Yassir Lester as Shabaz, a trainer at the gym.
- Ginger Gonzaga as Dana, the bookkeeper at the gym.
- Robert Costanzo as Uncle Bud, a trainer at the gym.
- Mindy Kaling as Priya Patel, Michael's mother, who drops him off to live with his father Vince, so Michael can attend a prestigious performing arts school.
- Kevin Quinn as Gregg, a classmate of Michael's.
- Edgar Blackmon as Dean Pasquesi, the dean of Michael's school.
- Jon Rudnitsky as Asher, Dana's boyfriend.

=== Guest ===
- Hasan Minhaj as Ro ("My Fair Uncle"), Michael's uncle and Priya's brother.
- Karan Brar as Arjun ("Vincemas"), a student at Michael's school.
- Carolyn Hennesy as Gayle ("Grandma Dearest"), Vince and Matthew's mother.
- Kether Donohue as Denise ("Grandma Dearest")
- Aloma Wright as Sister Timothy ("Matt Bomer Poster")

== Episodes ==
No.	Title	Directed by	Written by	Original release date	U.S. viewers (millions)
1	"Pilot"	Michael Spiller	Charlie Grandy & Mindy Kaling	March 8, 2018	2.70
Vince, after a series of failures, is going to sell his gym secretly and move to Florida. But, on his way is his fifteen-year-old son Michael, who has to live with his father during audition to the Academy of Art. Vince goes with Michael to audition, where he sings Queen's song We Are the Champions.
2	"I Think I'm Gonna Tolerate It Here"	Michael Spiller	Charlie Grandy & Mindy Kaling	March 15, 2018	3.02
Dana reports that Vince and Matthew need to collect $5,000 till Monday to pay a fine to the bank and regain the gym. At the same time, Vince tries to educate Michael, believing he's spoiled. But everything goes out of control when friends find out that Vince is selling the gym and he's keeping his son a secret.
3	"Lumps"	Alex Reid	Chris Schleicher	March 29, 2018	1.94
Champions begins to lose female members after a new female-friendly gym opens in the neighborhood. Vince and his employees struggle to figure out what the gym is doing wrong and how to fix it. Meanwhile, Michael struggles with Math and offers advice to Dana on her love life as she tutors him.
4	"My Fair Uncle"	Claire Scanlon	Mindy Kaling & Charlie Grandy	April 5, 2018	1.98
Priya's wealthy brother, Ro shows up at the gym looking to spend time with Michael, which Vince uses as an opportunity to break Matthew's new rules on dating. However, Vince has to choose between his romantic life and Michael when he discovers there is more to Ro than it seems.
5	"Vincemas"	Geeta V. Patel	Matt Warburton	April 12, 2018	1.68
Vince and Matthew invites Michael to their camping tradition for the first time but Michael is reluctant to go as he has no friends to go with. Meanwhile, the gym crew plans a party for Vince going away which they call "Vincemas." Vince encourages Michael to make friends at his school and be cool like him in high school but Michael realizes that the new clique he's made at school is not as they seem to be.
6	"Grandma Dearest"	Michael Spiller	Aaron Geary & Ben Steiner	April 19, 2018	1.64
When a school project makes Michael interested in meeting his grandmother, Vince has to come to terms with years of emotional neglect. Meanwhile, the Champions staff enlists Michael in updating their website, including adding a testimonial from a less than pleasant gym member.
7	"Matt Bomer Poster"	Maggie Carey	Ali Schouten	April 26, 2018	1.50
Vince tries to deal with Michael growing up when he finds a suggestive poster in his son's room. At the same time, Michael learns Matthew's long-kept secret of never having finished high school and decides to help his uncle. Dana is featured in an art show but fears no one will come.
8	"Nepotism"	Michael Spiller	Matt Warburton	May 3, 2018	1.53
A rift between Dana and Matthew leads to a debate of nepotism among the Champions staff and a discovery about Dana's boyfriend. Meanwhile, Michael loses his motivation when he fails to get the lead role in his musical, so Vince gives him a pep talk about not giving up.
9	"Opening Night"	Geeta V. Patel	Chris Schleicher	May 25, 2018	1.90
Priya shows up for the opening night of Michael's musical, wanting to take him back to Cleveland with her, but Michael doesn't want to leave his new life in New York. Matthew has trouble being the bad guy when he is asked to give the Champions staff performance reviews.
10	"Deal or No Deal"	Michael Spiller	Charlie Grandy	May 25, 2018	1.34
An old friend of his offers Vince an opportunity to return to the world of baseball, but it would require leaving Brooklyn and his new family. Meanwhile, Michael finally lands a date with his crush and the lead of his musical, Gregg.

== Production ==
=== Development ===
On October 5, 2016, it was announced that NBC had given a put pilot commitment to an untitled script by Mindy Kaling and Charlie Grandy. The project stemmed from a writing, producing, and acting deal that Kaling had signed with Universal Television during the previous summer. Universal Television was set to produce the pilot alongside Kaling International and 3 Arts Entertainment. Kaling and Grandy were expected to executive produce alongside Howard Klein.

On January 26, 2017, it was announced that NBC had officially given the production a pilot order. The announcement was accompanied by the reveal of the series' premise. On May 13, 2017, it was announced that NBC had given the production a series order. Michael Alan Spiller was announced to be an executive producer for the series and it was reported that he was also expected to direct. Eyes Up Productions was also added to the list of production companies involved with the series.

On June 29, 2018, it was announced that NBC had officially cancelled the series. Before the cancellation was announced, producers had reportedly been in talks with Netflix, which carries the series internationally, about potentially picking up the show but the discussions ultimately did not lead to a renewal. Producers were still said to be searching for a potential new home for the series. On September 13, 2018, it was announced that the series had failed to find a new home.

=== Casting ===
Alongside the announcement of the series' pilot order, it was announced that Mindy Kaling had been cast in the pilot in the potentially recurring role of Priya. In February 2017, it was announced that Mouzam Makkar, Anders Holm, Andy Favreau, and Josie Totah had joined the pilot in potential series regular roles. On March 6, 2017, it was announced that Nina Wadia had been cast in a series regular role. On October 6, 2017, it was reported that Fortune Feimster had joined the main cast. On December 13, 2017, it was announced that Ginger Gonzaga had been cast in a recurring role.

== Broadcast ==
The series is currently available through Netflix in the United Kingdom, Australia, Italy, United States, Canada, México, India, Ireland, Argentina, France, Norway and Germany.

== Reception ==
=== Critical response ===
The series received positive reviews from critics upon its premiere. On the review aggregation website Rotten Tomatoes, the series holds a 63% approval rating with an average rating of 6.23 out of 10 based on 19 reviews. The website's critical consensus reads, "Champions has a charming cast and good-natured approach to sensitive issues which make it a worthwhile watch." Metacritic, which uses a weighted average, assigned the series a score of 64 out of 100 based on 13 reviews, indicating "generally favorable reviews.

In a positive review, the San Francisco Chronicle's David Wiegand said, "Kaling and co-creator Grandy use plot as a display case for consistently funny writing and sweet and credible performances by the ensemble cast and, most of all, the exceptional skills of J.J. Totah, who plays Priya and Vince's proudly out son, Michael." In a more mixed review, Daniel Fienberg of The Hollywood Reporter said that Totah is "clearly talented in a variety of ways" and "gets the best punchlines in the early episodes", but that her "extremely focused myopia doesn't always track believably and the show has yet to figure out how to make Michael's schooling a part of the show in any real way. ... The show's workplace zaniness is definitely where Champions is most a work-in-progress." Variety's Sonia Saraiya offered the show restrained praise saying, "With a little adjustment, Champions could be fantastic. The exceptionally diverse cast brings a lot to the table, and the writing is smart and fresh. But right now it's a bit too disjointed to be a complete success." Particular praise was received for Josie Totah's performance as Michael; The New York Times' Margaret Lyons called Totah's performance "superb," saying that Totah's "comic energy is astoundingly well calibrated," and that Totah "allows just enough genuine humanity to show through Michael's haughty, campy fieriness."

=== Ratings ===
Viewership and ratings per episode of Champions
No.	Title	Air date	Rating/share (18–49)	Viewers (millions)
1	"Pilot"	March 8, 2018	0.7/3	2.70
2	"I Think I'm Gonna Tolerate it Here"	March 15, 2018	0.7/2	3.02
3	"Lumps"	March 29, 2018	0.5/2	1.94
4	"My Fair Uncle"	April 5, 2018	0.5/2	1.98
5	"Vincemas"	April 12, 2018	0.4/2	1.68
6	"Grandma Dearest"	April 19, 2018	0.4/2	1.64
7	"Matt Bomer Poster"	April 26, 2018	0.4/2	1.50
8	"Nepotism"	May 3, 2018	0.4/2	1.53
9	"Opening Night"	May 25, 2018	0.4/2	1.90
10	"Deal or No Deal"	May 25, 2018	0.3/1	1.34
