= Late Night (film) =

2019 film by Nisha Ganatra

- Theatrical release poster
- Directed by: Nisha Ganatra
- Written by: Mindy Kaling
- Produced by: Ben Browning; Jillian Apfelbaum; Mindy Kaling; Howard Klein
- Starring: Emma Thompson; Mindy Kaling; Max Casella; Hugh Dancy; John Lithgow; Denis O'Hare; Reid Scott; Amy Ryan
- Cinematography: Matthew Clark
- Edited by: Eleanor Infante
- Music by: Lesley Barber
- Production companies: FilmNation Entertainment; 30West; Imperative Entertainment; 3 Arts Entertainment; Kaling International
- Distributed by: Amazon Studios
- Release dates: January 25, 2019 (Sundance); June 7, 2019 (United States)
- Running time: 102 minutes
- Country: United States
- Language: English
- Budget: $9.5 million
- Box office: $22.4 million

Late Night is a 2019 American comedy-drama film directed by Nisha Ganatra and written by Mindy Kaling. It stars Emma Thompson as a popular TV host who hires a new writer (played by Kaling) to keep her and her show from getting replaced. Max Casella, Hugh Dancy, John Lithgow, Denis O'Hare, Reid Scott, and Amy Ryan also star.

The project was first announced in 2016, with Fox 2000 Pictures set to produce Kaling's script and Paul Feig signed on to direct. In August 2017, Ganatra replaced Feig and the film was picked up by FilmNation Entertainment. Much of the cast joined in April 2018 and filming began later that month in New York City. Following its premiere at the Sundance Film Festival on January 25, 2019, Amazon Studios bought the domestic distribution rights for a record $13 million.

Late Night was theatrically released in the United States on June 7, 2019. The film received positive reviews from critics, with praise for its social satire and commentary, screenplay, and Thompson's performance. For her performance, Thompson received a nomination at the 77th Golden Globe Awards for Best Actress – Motion Picture Comedy or Musical.

== Plot ==
Acclaimed British comedienne and long-time US late-night talk show host Katherine Newbury show's ratings have been steadily declining. She must revamp the show or be replaced.

Short of female staff, Katherine insists producer Brad remedy this. Molly Patel, a huge fan and chemical plant worker, is hired for being an Indian-American woman on a 13-week trial basis. She is quickly briefed before meeting the other writers. They treat Molly like a gopher, until Brad corrects them. She officially starts the next day.

Katherine surprises everyone at the writers' meeting the next morning, not knowing most of them. They try to introduce themselves. Overwhelmed, Katherine assigns them numbers. Molly unknowingly enters late, as the meeting started early, so is uncomfortable. Another late writer gets fired immediately. Katherine explains the urgency for improving their ratings and then asks for Molly's view, who agrees they have become stale. The others later confirm she is a diversity hire.

Molly shares an office with their most seasoned writer, Burditt. As she has zero professional comedy experience, she initially struggles. However, Molly proves her worth through helpful feedback, albeit initially not embraced until she offers concrete solutions. Eventually, she gives Katherine good material and ideas to expand their demographics. Specifically a menopause joke for the monologue is cut at the last minute, when Brad reminds her that once the topic is brought up, no one will forget.

Interviewing a YouTube influencer backfires on Katherine. Feeling mocked, the young woman calls her a bitter, out-of-touch old lady and insists Katherine needs her and not visa-versa to increase followers.

The writer Charlie invites Molly to watch his standup. When she complains about her joke being cut, he gives her don'ts for the job. Molly mentions her upcoming emceeing for a lung cancer comedy benefit, in tribute to her father, and Charlie volunteers his act. She rejects his advances, but he assumes it is inevitable.

After the YouTube star blowup is leaked, a publicist steps in to improve Katherine's image. She has Katherine throw a party in her apartment, inviting the staff, press, and many others. Charlie tries to speak with Katherine privately, which she rebuffs, saying to the oversexed writer that “it” had been a mistake.

Ignored by everyone, Molly wanders, inadvertently meeting Katherine's husband Walter and recognizing the NYU professor emeritus. He is hiding so his Parkinson's shaking does not make others uncomfortable. Walter suggests Molly become indispensable to Katherine.

When a reporter accuses Katherine both of exclusively hiring WASPs with elite backgrounds and calling them by number and not name, Molly introduces herself, assuring them she is not elite and skillfully deflecting the other concern with a joke.

When Katherine learns that young, popular comedian Daniel Tennant is to replace her, she insists her team needs more time. She points out he is vulgar and misogynistic.

The writers have to stay late for weeks. When Molly starts to go to her lung cancer emceeing event, Katherine threatens to fire her. Molly leaves anyway. Surprisingly, Katherine appears at the event, doing an impromptu routine. She speaks from the heart, then does well by ridiculing herself.

Back at work, Katherine implores everyone to push less safe, more specific political material. She has Molly work with Tom on the monologues. Katherine's writers help her become relevant again and more engaged. Katherine interacts with people directly on the street. A young, vampire series actress comes on, and this time Katherine admires her work and actually gets a hug. Overall, the public responds well.

Although their ratings are steadily improving, management still insists Katherine concede to Tennant. Both Brad and Tom assure her it is ok, but Molly insists she defy the network's demands and declare so publicly.

Charlie's e-mail is hacked, so his affair with Katherine after Walter's initial Parkinson's diagnosis is uncovered. Molly finds her sitting in the dark, pitying herself. She criticizes Katherine for giving up and so gets fired.

Katherine eventually apologizes to Walter, the writers, and the audience. Her sincerity and passion for the show secure her job. Katherine apologizes to Molly in Brooklyn, hiring her back. The show stays on air.

One year later, the show's team has diversified. Molly is co-monologue writer with Tom, with whom she has a relationship. Katherine's show is more successful than ever.

== Cast ==
- Dame Emma Thompson as Dame Katherine Newbury, an acclaimed late-night talk show host and comedian from the United Kingdom. She is the host of Tonight with Katherine Newbury, one of the most popular late-night talk shows in the United States but with declining ratings.
- Mindy Kaling as Molly Patel, an Indian-American writer who works for Katherine as staff member, who's dubbed by Katherine as Eight
- Amy Ryan as Caroline Morton, the president of the unnamed network on which Tonight with Katherine Newbury is shown
- John Lithgow as Walter Lovell, professor emeritus at NYU and Katherine's husband of 25 years
- Denis O'Hare as Brad, head writer of the show
- Paul Walter Hauser as Eugene Mancuso, one of the writers on the show, dubbed as One
- John Early as Chris Reynolds, one of the writers on the show, dubbed as Two
- Hugh Dancy as Charlie Fain, one of the writers on the show, dubbed as Four, with whom Katherine had a two month-long affair three years ago
- Max Casella as Burditt, a writer who has worked on the show for 27 years, dubbed as Five
- Nick Denning as one of the writers, dubbed as Six
- Reid Scott as Tom Campbell, a monologue writer on the show, dubbed as Seven
- Blake DeLong as McCary, a writer with a long-distance relationship who got fired
- Lucas Caleb Rooney as Gabe Eichler, a writer who got fired after he asked for a raise
- Luke Slattery as Hayes Campbell, Tom's younger brother instead of whom Molly was hired
- Annaleigh Ashford as Mimi Mismatch, a YouTube star who is a guest on Tonight with Katherine Newbury
- Megalyn Echikunwoke as Robin, Katherine's new publicist
- Marc Kudisch as Billy Kastner
- Ike Barinholtz as Daniel Tennant, a popular and controversial comedian known for his vulgar and misogynistic humor and who is considered a possible replacement for Katherine Newbury
- Halston Sage as Zoe Martlin, an actress promoting The Van Hellsing Prep on Tonight with Katherine Newbury
- Bill Maher as himself
- Seth Meyers as himself
- Jake Tapper as himself
- Maria Dizzia as Joan
- Jia Patel as Pavarti, Molly's cousin
- Sakina Jaffrey as Mrs. Patel, Molly's mother

== Production ==
In September 2016, it was reported that Fox 2000 had bought the rights to the project, written by Mindy Kaling, who was also set to costar alongside Emma Thompson. In November 2016, Paul Feig signed on to direct the film. However, in August 2017, Nisha Ganatra was announced as director when Feig dropped out due to scheduling conflicts.

In February 2018, it was reported that 30West and FilmNation Entertainment would co-finance the film and sell distribution rights. In April 2018, John Lithgow, Hugh Dancy, Reid Scott, Paul Walter Hauser, Denis O'Hare, John Early, Max Casella and Megalyn Echikunwoke joined the cast, with filming commencing April 23, 2018 in Canada. Amy Ryan joined the cast in May.

== Release ==
Late Night had its world premiere at the Sundance Film Festival on January 25, 2019. Shortly after, Amazon Studios acquired U.S. distribution rights to the film for $13 million, the largest sum paid for U.S.-only distribution at the festival.

The film began its U.S. theatrical play with a limited release on June 7, 2019, in Los Angeles and New York City, and expanded to the rest of the US the following weekend. Amazon's marketing budget for the film amounted to roughly $35 million.

== Reception ==
=== Box office ===
Late Night grossed $15.5 million in the United States and Canada, and $6.9 million in other territories, for a worldwide total of $22.4 million. In June 2019, the film was estimated to have lost Amazon $40 million due to the cost of acquisition and marketing.

In its limited opening weekend, the film made $249,694 from four theaters, for a per-venue average of $62,414, the second-best of 2019. The film expanded on June 14, opposite the openings of Men in Black: International and Shaft, and was projected to gross $5 million from 2,218 theaters over the weekend. It ended up making $5.1 million, finishing ninth. While in-line with projections, the opening was viewed as disappointing given the positive critical reception and the studio's cost of acquisition. However, Deadline Hollywood noted the film was essentially an advertisement for streaming on Amazon Prime, and audiences may have been waiting to see it later. It made $2.6 million the following weekend, dropping 51% to 12th.

=== Critical response ===
On the review aggregator website Rotten Tomatoes, 80% of 300 critics' reviews are positive, with an average rating of 6.80/10. The website's consensus reads: "Smart, timely, and brought to life by a terrific cast, Late Night is a workplace comedy with a lot of heart—and just as many laughs." On Metacritic, the film has a weighted average score of 70 out of 100, based on 46 critics, indicating "generally favorable" reviews. Audiences polled by CinemaScore gave the film an average grade of "B+" on an A+ to F scale, while those at PostTrak gave it an average 3.5 out of 5 stars, with women (who made up 71% of the demographic) grading it an overall positive score of 80%.

A.O. Scott of The New York Times described the film's humor as "sharp" yet "cruelty-free", and wrote, "[Late Night] argues that entertainment benefits from the presence of different faces and voices not by preaching but by example." Owen Gleiberman of Variety magazine called the film "lively yet scattershot" and praised Thompson's performance, saying "Thompson truly seems like a born talk-show host. Even when she's just riffing, she grounds Late Night in something real."

Anthony Kaufman of ScreenDaily also praised Thompson for "a memorable performance as the abrasive 'cold witch,' as someone describes her, perhaps even outdoing Meryl Streep's Miranda Priestly in The Devil Wears Prada as a delightfully wicked woman of power." Leah Greenblatt of Entertainment Weekly also praised Thompson's performance, saying her "gravitas holds the center," and that "the best scenes in Late Night are consistently the ones where the movie's main stars spar and banter and intermittently connect." Greenblatt praised director Nisha Ganatra for refreshing classic romantic comedy tropes, but added that the tone is at times "scattershot and sometimes too sitcom-ish."

Alissa Wilkinson of Vox said "Late Night is a workplace comedy that feels like a cousin of The Devil Wears Prada, and its greatest strength is its two lead characters." She also wrote, "Late Night feels underwritten in some spots, but it's surprising in others—an unfussy, entertaining comedy with some serious matters on its mind." Richard Lawson of Vanity Fair described it as "a genial, funny movie, not a mile-a-minute behind-the-cameras gag-fest (hyphens!) like 30 Rock, but an amiable workplace comedy that finds personal definition in its influences." Sheila O'Malley of RogerEbert.com rated the film three and a half out of four stars, specifying that is "an earnest and funny comedy, with very sharp teeth."

=== Accolades ===
| Year | Award | Category | Recipient | Result | Ref. |
|---|---|---|---|---|---|
| 2020 | 77th Golden Globe Awards | Best Actress in a Motion Picture – Musical or Comedy | Emma Thompson | Nominated | |
| 2019 | Detroit Film Critics Society Awards | Breakthrough Performance | Paul Walter Hauser (Note: Also for Richard Jewell, Beats and 7 Days to Vegas) | Nominated | |
| 2019 | 45th People's Choice Awards | Favorite Comedy Movie Star | Mindy Kaling | Nominated | |
| 2019 | Teen Choice Awards | Choice Summer Movie | | Nominated | |
| 2019 | Teen Choice Awards | Choice Summer Movie Actress | Mindy Kaling | Nominated | |
