= Tommy Dewey =

American actor, producer (born 1978)

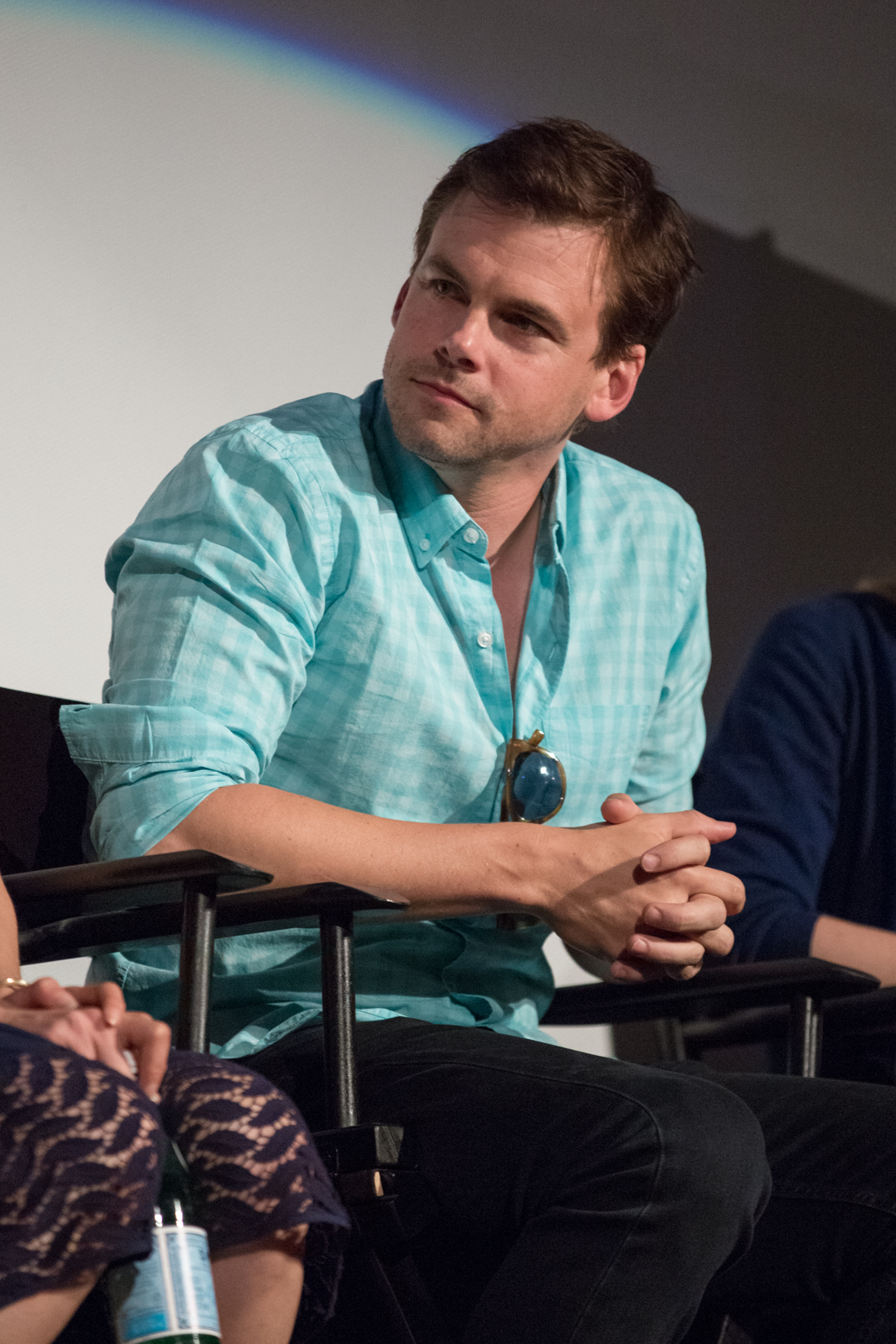
- Dewey in June 2016
- Born: Thomas R. Dewey; August 3, 1978 (age 48); Birmingham, Alabama, U.S.
- Occupations: Actor; producer; writer
- Years active: 2001–present

Thomas R. Dewey (born August 3, 1978) is an American actor, producer, and writer. He co-starred in the Hulu original series Casual.

== Early life ==
Dewey was born in Birmingham, Alabama. He went to Mountain Brook High School, and graduated from the Woodrow Wilson School of Public and International Affairs at Princeton University.

== Career ==
Dewey's first television role was in sitcom What I Like About You. One of his breakout roles was playing in the first season of the show The Mindy Project, where he played Josh Daniels, a lawyer who was one of the title character's love interests. From 2015-18, Dewey co-starred in the Hulu original series Casual.

== Filmography ==
=== Film ===
Year	Title	Role	Notes
2001	Gym Short	Steve	Short film
2006	I'm Reed Fish	Rex	
2006	Fist in the Eye	Scott	
2007	Unearthed	Charlie	
2007	On the Doll	Jesse	
2009	17 Again	Roger	
2012	The Babymakers	Todd	
2012	Step Up Revolution	Trip	
2014	The Nobodies	Julie's brother	Short film
2015	The Escort	JP	
2018	Book Club	Scott	
2018	The Front Runner	John Emerson	
2019	Wyrm	Uncle Chet	
2020	She's in Portland	Wes	
2024	Your Monster	Monster	
2024	Saturday Night	Michael O'Donoghue	

=== Television ===
Year	Title	Role	Notes
2001–02	Guiding Light	Mike	Guest role
2004	What I Like About You	Greg	Episode: "Lunar Eclipse of the Heart"
2004–05	The Mountain	Michael Dowling	12 episodes
2006	Cold Case	Nick Bartleby (1929)	Episode: "Beautiful Little Fool"
2007	Grey's Anatomy	Mike	Episode: "Kung Fu Fighting"
2009	Roommates	James	7 episodes
2009	Criminal Minds	Tommy Wheeler	Episode: "House on Fire"
2010	Mad Men	John Flory	Episode: "Chinese Wall"
2011	Better with You	Ron	Episode: "Better with a Cat"
2011	CSI: Miami	Grant Boyer	Episode: "Last Stand"
2011	Friends with Better Lives	Tim	Episode: "The Deceivers"
2011	Starf*ckers	Palmer Jones	Web series; episode: "Limo Ride"
2012	Melissa & Joey	Donald	Episode: "Breaking Up Is Hard to Do"
2012	Happily Divorced	Rob	Episode: "A Star Is Reborn"
2012–16	The Mindy Project	Josh Daniels	11 episodes
2013	Major Crimes	Lloyd Gibbs	Episode: "I, Witness"
2013	It's Always Sunny in Philadelphia	Harris Marder	Episode: "Mac and Dennis Buy a Timeshare"
2014	Writers' Block	Tommy	Web series; episode: "Sticky Situation"
2014	Intelligence	Bryce Tyler	Episode: "Size Matters"
2014	Hot in Cleveland	Todd	Episode: "Brokeback Elka"
2014	Jennifer Falls	Ethan	Episode: "Pilot"
2015–18	Casual	Alex	Main cast
2016	Code Black	Dr. Mike Leighton	6 episodes
2016	Royal Pains	Win Reynolds	Episode: "Fly Me to Kowloon"
2016–18	Now We're Talking	Tommy Arondall	15 episodes
2017	Great News	Trip	Episode: "War Is Hell”
2017	The Guest Book	Blake	Episode: “Story 5”
2017	The Magic School Bus Rides Again	Ed Tennelli	Episode: "In the Swim"
2019	Four Weddings and a Funeral	Ted	Guest role, miniseries
2020	Curb Your Enthusiasm	Dr. Fuller	Episode: "The Spite Store"
2020	Home Movie: The Princess Bride	Westley	Episode: "Chapter Eight: Ultimate Suffering"
2021–26	Rugrats	Stu Pickles, Rusty	Voice role
2022	Pivoting	Henry	Main role
2023	Perry Mason	Brooks McCutcheon	3 episodes
2025	Murdaugh: Death in the Family	Mark Tinsley	Miniseries
2026	Running Point	Magnus	3 episodes

=== Producer ===
Year	Title	Notes
2010	Sons of Tucson	13 episodes

=== Writer ===
Year	Title	Notes
2010	Sons of Tucson	13 episodes
