= Velma (TV series) =

American animated television series (2023–2024)

- Genre: Adult animation; Animated sitcom; Mystery; Comedy horror
- Based on: Characters by Hanna-Barbera Productions
- Developed by: Charlie Grandy
- Voices of: Mindy Kaling; Glenn Howerton; Sam Richardson; Constance Wu
- Music by: Craig DeLeon
- Country of origin: United States
- Original language: English
- No. of seasons: 2
- No. of episodes: 21

Production
- Executive producers: Charlie Grandy; Mindy Kaling; Howard Klein; Sam Register; Elijah Aron
- Producers: Kandace Reuter; Rick Williams; Greg Gallant
- Editors: Brian Swanson; Erin Hassidim
- Running time: 22–28 minutes
- Production companies: Charlie Grandy Productions; Kaling International; 3 Arts Entertainment; Warner Bros. Animation

Original release
- Network: HBO Max
- Release: January 12, 2023 – October 3, 2024

Related
- Scooby-Doo and Guess Who? (2019–21)

Velma is an American adult animated mystery comedy television series featuring characters from the Scooby-Doo franchise. Created by Charlie Grandy for HBO Max, it stars executive producer Mindy Kaling as the voice of Velma Dinkley, with Sam Richardson, Constance Wu, and Glenn Howerton in supporting roles. Grandy also serves as the showrunner of the series. It revolves around Velma Dinkley and the other human members of Mystery Inc. before their official formation, making it the first television series in the franchise to not feature the character Scooby-Doo.

The series premiered on January 12, 2023. A second season was released on April 25, 2024, with a Halloween special premiering on October 3 of the same year. In October 2024, the series was canceled after two seasons, which was confirmed 6 days after the release of the Halloween special.

Velma received negative reviews from critics, who criticized its humor, meta storytelling, characterization, writing, and departures from the traditional Scooby-Doo format, though the voice acting and animation were praised. Audience reception was overwhelmingly negative.

== Plot ==
The series serves as an alternate universe origin story for Mystery Inc., pitched as a "love quadrangle" between them. It primarily focuses on Velma Dinkley as she tries to solve a mystery regarding the disappearance of her mother, as well as the murders of local teenage girls.

== Voice cast ==
=== Main ===
- Mindy Kaling as Velma Dinkley, a rude and snarky teenage would-be detective, who has a crush on murder suspect Fred Jones. She has a lifelong passion for solving mysteries that she inherited from her mother, but since her disappearance years prior, Velma is a lot more cautious regarding mysteries and has horrific guilt-based hallucinations whenever she attempts to solve one. She is partially modeled after Kaling and is portrayed as a bisexual South Asian American.
- Glenn Howerton as Fred Jones, a popular but dimwitted 16-year-old murder suspect, and Velma's crush who is the heir to the Jones Gentlemen Accessories fashion line. He is also a noted late bloomer in terms of puberty. He is the only original Mystery, Inc. member depicted as White.
- Sam Richardson as Norville Rogers, Velma's best friend and a school news reporter, who has a crush on her and frequently brings up how much he hates drugs. He is portrayed as African American, and is exclusively referred to by his real first name instead of his familiar nickname, Shaggy. He also does not share the original Shaggy's cowardice, although his love of snacks remains.
- Constance Wu as Daphne Blake, a popular girl and Velma's former best friend, who has "complicated feelings" for her. Raised by two adoptive mothers, Daphne hopes to discover her biological parents. This version is portrayed as East Asian American.

=== Supporting ===
- Russell Peters as Aman Dinkley, Velma's lawyer father who struggles to keep her in line
- Melissa Fumero as Sophie, Aman's girlfriend who also owns Spooner's Malt Shop. She is initially pregnant but eventually gives birth to Amanda in "Velma Makes a List".
- Sarayu Blue as Diya Dinkley, Velma's missing alcoholic mother who used to write mysteries, inspiring her daughter's passion
- Jane Lynch as Donna Blake, one of Daphne's two adoptive mothers who is a slightly incompetent detective investigating Brenda's disappearance
- Wanda Sykes as Linda Blake, Daphne's other adoptive mother and fellow detective
- Ming-Na Wen as Carroll, Daphne's biological mother and a member of the Crystal Cove Gang
- Ken Leung as Darren, Daphne's biological father and a member of the Crystal Cove Gang
- Cherry Jones as Victoria Jones, Fred's mother who often spoils and babies her son
- Frank Welker as William Jones, Fred's father who is ashamed of him. Welker has voiced Fred since the character's inception in 1969.
- Nicole Byer as Blythe Rogers, Norville's African American mother and the principal of Crystal Cove High
- Gary Cole as Lamont Rogers, Norville's white father who works as Crystal Cove High's school counselor/therapist.
- "Weird Al" Yankovic as Dandruff Tuba, a student at Crystal Cove High. A running gag involves him getting frequently injured by the gang's antics.
- Fortune Feimster as Olive, a popular girl at Crystal Cove High
- Yvonne Orji (season 1) and Andia Winslow (season 2) as Gigi, a cool girl at Crystal Cove High
- Karl-Anthony Towns as Jacques Beau (Jock Bo), a handsome jock at Crystal Cove High
- Shay Mitchell as Brenda, an attractive, popular girl at Crystal Cove High who was murdered and lobotomized
- Debby Ryan as Krista, another attractive girl at Crystal Cove High who is lobotomized in the same manner as Brenda
- Kulap Vilaysack as Lola, another attractive girl at Crystal Cove High who is lobotomized in the same manner as Brenda and Krista
- Jim Rash as Dave, the self-proclaimed "cool" Mayor of Crystal Cove
- Stephen Root as Sheriff Cogburn, the incompetent sheriff of Crystal Cove.
- Jennifer Hale (season 2) as Thorn, the former lead vocalist and guitarist of the eco-gothic rock band The Hex Girls, and is the mother of Amber
- Sara Ramirez (season 2) as Amber, the non-binary goth child of Thorn
- Vanessa Williams (season 2) as Edna Perdue, a scientist and researcher of the human brain, and Norville's maternal grandmother
- Jason Mantzoukas (season 2) as Scrappy-Doo, an anthropomorphic dog and one of the test subjects of Project SCOOBI in Crystal Cove

Credits adapted from Behind The Voice Actors.

== Episodes ==
=== Series overview ===
| Season | Episodes | Originally released | |
| Season | Episodes | First released | Last released |
|---|---|---|---|
| 1 | 10 | January 12, 2023 | February 9, 2023 |
| 2 | 10 | April 25, 2024 | |
| Special | | October 3, 2024 | |

=== Season 1 (2023) ===
| No. overall | No. in season | Title | Directed by | Written by | Original release date |
|---|---|---|---|---|---|
| 1 | 1 | "Velma" | Anne Walker Farrell | Charlie Grandy | January 12, 2023 |
Velma is implicated when Brenda is lobotomized and is tasked with clearing her name within twenty-four hours, despite having guilt-driven hallucinations about mysteries since her mother went missing. After hearing from Norville that it might be connected to a missing camera and a cover-up in the malt shop bathroom, she suspects Sophie is involved, but she is soon proven innocent. Aman explains Diya simply left them on purpose, supposedly solving the mystery. Velma attempts to move on, only to be confronted by the other girls, including Daphne, who lets it slip that Fred has some insecurities and is known to kick partners out of the malt shop bathroom. Velma and Norville sneak into his mansion and find the latter's camera, revealing Fred was the one who covered up the evidence. Fred explains he is simply embarrassed about being a late bloomer and seemingly plans to kill Velma but just wants to buy her silence. He is nonetheless taken in by Donna and Linda. With her name cleared, Velma strives to pick up mystery-solving again and figure out what happened to her mother, only to find Krista has been lobotomized as well.
| 2 | 2 | "The Candy (Wo)man" | Cal Ramsey | Akshara Sekar | January 12, 2023 |
While Aman reluctantly agrees to defend Fred in court, Velma asks Daphne for the cold-case file on Diya, but Daphne says she'll only do it if given $500. Velma soon discovers Daphne is the school's "candy woman" and is threatened with helping her sell more drugs. Meanwhile, Norville makes several attempts to get the $500 for her, from selling a sword from his room to almost donating a kidney. He is rewarded $500 for apprehending a gunman but does not accept it, figuring he should win Velma's heart instead of buying it. Daphne reveals the real reason why she is selling drugs and ends up reconnecting with Velma. Aman agrees to give Velma the $500 if she helps him prove Fred's innocence, which she ultimately does. Everyone is convinced, but Fred snaps when his childishness is displayed to the public, and he is declared guilty. While Aman's career is ruined, Daphne gives Velma her mother's file. It contains a clue, stating her phone last went off at Fred's house, much to her shock. Daphne manages to stop her hallucination by kissing her, much to Norville's dismay.
| 3 | 3 | "Velma Kai" | Meg Waldow | Stephanie Amante-Ritter | January 19, 2023 |
While sorting out her feelings for Daphne, Velma plans to ask an imprisoned Fred about Diya, but another hallucination gets her kicked out of the prison. Crystal Cove High holds a women's self-defense tournament with Daphne and Velma making it to the finals. Before their fight, they both admit to liking each other, but Velma suspects Daphne will not explore her feelings because her popularity is at stake. She ends up reading Daphne's journal in front of the student body but is forced to apologize after her stunt backfires. The girls reconcile but decide to just be friends for now. Meanwhile, Norville tries to pick Fred's brain in Velma's place, borrowing his father's cardigan to seem like a real therapist. Fred confirms he had nothing to do with the murders or Diya's disappearance, much to Velma's chagrin. The other prisoners also seek Norville's therapy, but when he forgets to show up, they incite a riot and bust out, only to get caught by Linda and Donna.
| 4 | 4 | "Velma Makes a List" | Gina Gress | Elijah Aron | January 19, 2023 |
After Fred is exonerated and released from prison, a third girl named Lola is confirmed lobotomized much like Brenda and Krista. Sheriff Cogburn determines the pattern in the cases, being that each victim is attractive. Velma offers to rank which girls are the most likely to be murdered, but this prompts every girl to intentionally sexualize herself to make it on the list. Overwhelmed, Velma tells Fred to make the list for her, which includes Daphne, and at the cops' request, she tries to mask the girls' attractiveness to keep them safe. The girls reject this, feeling they should not have to hide their true selves for any reason. Velma is not given much time to think about this when she becomes a half-sister after Sophie gives birth. Meanwhile, Fred learns to appreciate inner beauty after reading The Feminine Mystique, and Norville helps Daphne find some clues about her parents' disappearance by rooting through the town's history with crystals. Norville runs into Gigi and instantly becomes attracted to her.
| 5 | 5 | "Marching Band Sleepover" | Cal Ramsey | Matt Warburton | January 26, 2023 |
While Norville's new relationship with Gigi keeps him occupied from helping in Velma's investigation, Fred tells her that his house used to belong to a mad scientist named Dr. Edna Perdue. Since Fred is unable to ease Velma's hallucinations, she decides to hold a canceled marching band sleepover at her house to lure Norville over. Velma and Gigi fight over his attention before Gigi reveals that Dr. Perdue is Norville's grandmother. The sleepover goes awry after the guests start starving, so Velma, Norville, Gigi, and Fred go out to get some food in Linda and Donna's stolen police car due to the town-wide curfew. Velma eventually realizes her selfishness and lets herself get caught by the police so the others can escape, during which she bribes Principal Rogers into telling her about Dr. Perdue. Meanwhile, Daphne infiltrates the closed crystal coves and finds her disguised biological parents there, who claim that her mothers stole her from them. After they refuse to tell Daphne more about her adoption, she secretly returns to the cove where her parents are revealed to be members of a criminal gang.
| 6 | 6 | "The Sins of the Fathers and Some of the Mothers" | Meg Wadlow | Elijah Aron and Jenna Simmons | January 26, 2023 |
Principal Rogers tells Velma the story of how Dr. Edna Perdue went insane after working on a secret project called Special Covert Operation Brain Initiative (S.C.O.O.B.I.). Before she can reveal how this is connected to Diya, Velma hallucinates again. After realizing that these are caused by her father's disbelief about her mother's kidnapping, Velma confronts Aman, who decides to spend more time with her. They begin to bond, but Velma discovers Aman used her as an excuse so he can do his job on his paternity leave behind Sophie's back. Frustrated, Velma demands the answers from Rogers who tells her that Diya researched Perdue's work. With Fred's help, Velma finds Perdue's old lab under the Jones' house where they are joined by Aman, who finally believes Diya's kidnapping after finding a note "JINKIES" in her handwriting. Meanwhile, Daphne spends time with her biological parents, only to learn that they want to use her as an insurance policy when they leave the town with the stolen crystals. They are arrested by Linda and Donna, who finally tell the truth to Daphne about her adoption and she reconciles with them.
| 7 | 7 | "Fog Fest" | Meg Waldow | Stephanie Amante-Ritter | February 2, 2023 |
With her hallucinations finally over, Velma spends all her time investigating, while the town-wide curfew is lifted due to the annual Crystal Cove Fog Fest. Fred's parents insist that Fred win the Fog King and Queen title, so he asks Daphne to be his date to increase his chances, while Norville also plans to win the title for himself and Gigi. Velma discovers a hidden phone number on Diya's "JINKIES" note, and after calling it, she realizes that the serial killer is at Fog Fest. Since girls are not allowed to attend without a date, she disguises herself as a guy named Manny. She finds that everyone gives her more attention this way, including Daphne, who becomes attracted to Manny, even telling "him" how Velma ignored her lately. After they get elected as Fog King and Queen, Fred exposes Velma's disguise but still ends up losing the title to Norville and Gigi. Velma apologizes to Daphne for being a bad friend before the serial killer shows up and attacks them. They manage to escape, but so does the killer, leaving only a cell phone behind. Fred is kidnapped by the killer.
| 8 | 8 | "A Velma in the Woods" | Cal Ramsey | Matt Warburton and Stephanie M. Johnson | February 2, 2023 |
Daphne and Velma hack the serial killer's phone, finding a photo of Mount Crystal Woods. They plan to go there the next day, but Daphne rain-checks at the last minute to hang out with Olive instead. Velma lies about her hallucinations returning to lure Daphne along, and Norville invites them to stay at Gigi's family's cabin, where Gigi originally planned a romantic evening for themselves. After they all become trapped at the bottom of a ravine, Daphne admits she purposely wanted to make Velma jealous because she loves her possessive nature, while Gigi confronts Norville about him still liking Velma. They later discover a tunnel connected to the crystal mines, and it leads them to the serial killer's lair where they find Fred and the still-living brains of the lobotomized girls. During this, Velma proposes for her and Daphne to start a relationship but they are interrupted when the tunnel begins to collapse. They are saved by Diya, who gets everyone safely to the surface in her van. Velma happily reunites with her mother, but when she asks who kidnapped her, Diya says she cannot remember.
| 9 | 9 | "Family (Wo)man" | Meg Wadlow | Charlie Grandy and Elijah Aron | February 9, 2023 |
Diya is diagnosed with amnesia and she only has three days to regain her memories before they are gone forever. Velma thinks the best way to bring her memories back is to keep her happy by lying about the events of the past two years, which includes hiding Aman's relationship with Sophie. She also lies that Sophie's child is hers from Norville, who agrees to play along. However, when Velma finds that Lamont has the same welding mask as the serial killer, she accuses him but he is proved to be innocent. Feeling betrayed by her actions, Norville officially ends his friendship with Velma. Meanwhile, Daphne and Fred pretend to be dating again to regain their popularity at school, and they reluctantly kiss to prove that, which is witnessed by Velma and hurts her feelings. Diya eventually learns about Aman's infidelity but feels freed from her loveless marriage, and her memories return. She reveals that she herself is the serial killer, much to everyone's shock.
| 10 | 10 | "The Brains of the Operation" | Gina Gress | Charlie Grandy | February 9, 2023 |
Velma refuses to believe her mother was the killer, but she does not have much time to prove her innocence before she is sentenced to death. After talking to her, she notices how mechanically she repeats all her answers and realizes Diya is hypnotized. She remembers that the killer also hypnotized her two years ago to blame herself for Diya's disappearance. Daphne finds the pocket watch that Velma remembers the killer used for hypnosis and they discover the logo of the Jones company on it. Velma figures out that Victoria Jones is the killer, trying to recreate Dr. Perdue's work to switch Fred's brain to a more competent person, so he could be a proper heir to the family company. Upon arriving at the Jones', she finds Daphne and Fred tied together in Perdue's lab and stops Victoria before she can hurt them. A fight ensues, ending with Norville's unexpected arrival, and he accidentally kills Victoria in the process. Despite solving the case and being hailed as heroes, the four of them drift apart due to the events and their complicated relationships with each other. Sheriff Cogburn is killed by a new murderer.

=== Season 2 (2024) ===
| No. overall | No. in season | Title | Directed by | Written by | Original release date |
|---|---|---|---|---|---|
| 11 | 1 | "The Mystery of Teen Romance" | Anne Walker Farrell | Charlie Grandy | April 25, 2024 |
Three weeks after thwarting Victoria, a now-popular Velma comes across Sheriff Cogburn's corpse, but is barred from solving any more mysteries by an overprotective Diya, who has given up writing. On top of this, she is still sorting out her feelings for both Norville and Daphne. The former suffers from guilt-based hallucinations that can only be assuaged by eating, all the while ignoring his parents' suggestions to try marijuana. The latter has to contend with both of her mothers running for Sheriff, while also rooming with Amber, the child of Thorn from the Hex Girls. Meanwhile, Fred blames Norville for his mother's death and is convinced that Victoria was really possessed by Edna Purdue's ghost, deciding to take up Christianity and solve the mystery on his own. Amidst all the confusion over the murder, everyone ultimately forgives each other, although not without Daphne walking out on Velma when she admits to still liking Norville. Diya regains her will to write after sleeping with Mr. S, Velma's favorite biology teacher, only for the latter to wind up murdered in his home.
| 12 | 2 | "Creaky Friday" | Meg Waldow | Jenna Michelle Simmons | April 25, 2024 |
On Creaky Friday—a day-long event where students are randomly paired up to oil the town's hinges—Velma rigs the selection to pair herself up with Fred, whom she believes has evidence pertaining to the disappearance of Mr. S. The two suspect Norville to be responsible for Cogburn's death after tracing a rented ghost costume back to him from a security feed photo, but Norville reveals that he only snuck into the police station to take back his grandmother's journals in hopes of curing his anxiety. Meanwhile, Daphne is paired up with Amber, and their quest takes them to the morgue, where they find that Cogburn's and Mr. S' bodies have had their penises removed. Eventually, Linda admits that she secretly gave Fred access to the security feed because their investigation had no leads. Thanks to an eavesdropper, the Sheriff's brother Merle finds out about the involvement of teenagers in the investigation and decides to enter the race against Linda and Donna.
| 13 | 3 | "When Velma Met Money" | Adam Parton | Elijah Aron | April 25, 2024 |
After Velma catches Diya having sex with William, the two make a deal where Diya will call off the relationship if Velma wins the upcoming science fair. She decides to cheat with help from William after spending a weekend at the Jones' and growing to love the rich. Norville manages to rid himself of his hallucinations at the cost of his empathy with help from Lola and decides to use their work as their science project. He asks Velma to send him some tainted urine so he can pass the drug test handled by Lamont, who is judging the fair and is unaware that his son is not consuming weed. Daphne and Amber do a project on manifestation, but the former is conflicted between deepening her friendship with Amber or risking driving away her popular friends. Fred does his project on how toast is made with help from Diya, whose love and support expose him to emotions his parents never brought out of him. Velma wins the fair but renounces wealth after seeing how much hatred she garners, Daphne and Amber profess their friendship, and Norville confesses to his sobriety. The latter's lack of empathy causes him to talk back to Lamont and land the whole gang in detention.
| 14 | 4 | "Seancé" | Cal Ramsey | Rick Williams | April 25, 2024 |
As the gang arrives for Saturday detention, Daphne shows up, having fully switched to the Wiccan lifestyle, much to Velma's disgust, while Norville notices that his empathy and hallucinations are returning. Amber suspects that he is possessed by Victoria's ghost and decides to set up a séance to exorcise him, with Velma secretly agreeing so she can out Amber as a fraud. Meanwhile, Aman and Lamont reminisce about their younger lives as Crystal Cove High students, only to realize that they need to stop living in the past. The séance is performed, with everyone experiencing a different vision as a result. Velma declares Amber a fraud given the physical evidence throughout the library, which only angers Daphne. Velma snaps, ranting about Wiccan beliefs and insulting Daphne for subscribing to them, pushing her away.
| 15 | 5 | "Burning Woman" | Meg Waldow | Stephanie M. Johnson | April 25, 2024 |
When the town's coroners are found dead in the school library, Velma posts that Amber might be the killer on social media, prompting an angry mob to threaten to lynch them. After several failed attempts by Fred and William, who unsuccessfully tries to get engaged to Diya, Velma manages to dispel the mob with another post, apologizing to Amber for jumping to conclusions. Her glasses accidentally light the stake on fire during a celebratory selfie, but the fire is doused when Aman bumps into a hydrant, promising to be there for Sophie. Meanwhile, Norville travels to the insane asylum after suspecting that his grandmother is still alive, with Daphne tagging along to avoid talking to Velma. Dr. Purdue reveals she has been in hiding for thirty years to avoid government detection, but has perfected Project S.C.O.O.B.I. and allowed people to find their true selves by temporarily removing their brains. After revealing offhand that the brains will die if left without a body for too long, she puts her brain into Daphne's body so she can replace the solution in the popular girls' tanks without drawing any suspicion.
| 16 | 6 | "Private Velmjamin" | Adam Parton | Katie Wadsworth and Keerthi Harishankar | April 25, 2024 |
Norville and Dr. Purdue (in Daphne's body) arrive at Crystal Cove High to tell Velma what is happening, promptly synthesizing a new solution for the popular girls' brain tanks. When the solution boils over, Purdue asks Velma to sneak into a military base to find the main ingredient. She also takes the time to talk to Principal Rogers, and has a change of heart regarding her approach to life after learning that her daughter loves but does not respect her. Velma is able to enter via a guided tour, with Fred tagging along, and sneaks off to find that a hidden lab is up and running with further Project S.C.O.O.B.I. research, which is quickly hidden before she can report it. Purdue reveals that she never ran out of the ingredient and only tricked Velma into entering the base to see if her research was being continued. Velma manages to create the solution, saving the girls, but Purdue is unable to return to her body due to Daphne's brain being carried off by cockroaches. Fred stands trial for his and Velma's actions, only to be called by his older love interest, who reveals herself to be the serial killer.
| 17 | 7 | "Female Utopia" | Cal Ramsey | Jen Chuck | April 25, 2024 |
Due to the serial killer being revealed as a woman, Linda and Donna lose their bid for sheriff to Merle, and all of the town's women are confined to the Crystal Mines for two days. During this time, Velma has to contend with Diya and Sophie's constant bickering. Meanwhile, Daphne takes a trip through her own mind alongside her birth parents to figure out who she is, revealing that she kissed Amber after her fight with Velma. Norville realizes that being around Fred is the cause of his hallucinations, and after drugging him during a chili cook-off, reveals to him that his grandmother is alive, causing Fred to run off in a panic after his theory is proven incorrect. As Sophie and Diya start to get along, Amanda—with help from a Baby Babble Box—pretends to be the serial killer by synthetizing her voice, clueing Velma in that the killer might be disguised. The women combine their insights from recent weeks to deduce that all of the victims knew about Project S.C.O.O.B.I. and were in talks with a lawyer, revealed to be Aman. Aman is questioned as Daphne reconciles with Velma after being returned to her body, although Daphne refuses to disclose what she did.
| 18 | 8 | "Aman Hunt" | Meg Waldow | Moss Perricone | April 25, 2024 |
During a class field trip to Sacramento, Aman escapes house arrest and stows away on the bus, ordering Velma to insert a thumb drive in a computer at the Capitol. The files reveal that all of the recent murder victims were working on Project S.C.O.O.B.I., and that the work environment was uncomfortable. During the journey, Velma reveals that she knew about Daphne and Amber's embrace, although Daphne reveals that there was no kiss, but instead the two cursed Velma to ensure no one could love her. Velma deems the gesture romantic and the two reconcile; Norville and Fred start to bond after the former backs the latter in his bid to add the theme park visit back to the field trip's schedule. Don reveals that Aman's house arrest was mainly for his own protection, as the super soldier responsible for the uncomfortable work environment is on the loose. On the way home, Velma deduces that the soldier, invented by a masked man codenamed "Uncle Scoobi", might not be human, only for a mysterious beast to topple the bus and kidnap her. In the confusion, it is revealed that Amber is secretly working with Dr. Purdue.
| 19 | 9 | "The Real Villain" | Adam Parton | Greg Gallant | April 25, 2024 |
Velma's kidnapper reveals himself to be the anthropomorphic dog Scrappy, one of Project S.C.O.O.B.I.'s test subjects who declares innocence and wants revenge on Don for shunning him. With help from Daphne, and after giving her blessing to recently engaged couples—William and Diya, and Sophie and Aman—Velma is able to grant Scrappy access to Don after being let go, only for Scrappy to reveal that he really was the killer. As he is arrested, he reveals his plan to rejoin Uncle Scoobi. Meanwhile, Amber reveals that they were only hired by Dr. Purdue to see whether Victoria really was a ghost, which turns out to be correct. While helping her relocate, they, Fred, and Norville are confronted by Victoria, who claims she cannot rest in peace until she sees Fred become a man. She attempts to possess his body to accomplish that goal, and is ultimately purified after Fred stands up to her. Dr. Purdue receives the popular girls' dead bodies, plotting to insert Scrappy's brain into one of them.
| 20 | 10 | "Til Death" | Cal Ramsey | Charlie Grandy | April 25, 2024 |
Knowing Uncle Scoobi is watching her every move, Velma and Daphne swap bodies and pose as each other for the remainder of the investigation, getting a feel for how they are perceived by other people. Uncle Scoobi sees through this ruse and incapacitates both, threatening to shoot Daphne after they escape. Velma deduces that their true identity is Sophie, who has been an undercover soldier the whole time and concealed her identity so her male superiors would take her seriously. Meanwhile, Norville and Lola discover that Dr. Purdue has the popular girls' bodies, and is planning to implant her brain into one to get out of hiding in exchange for doing the same for Scrappy. Having a change of heart, however, she puts the girls' brains back in their bodies. Upon being betrayed, Scrappy crashes the double wedding and fatally wounds Velma, but ends up dying after Velma's ghost possesses his body. Dr. Purdue is unable to restore Velma's body, but Amber reveals they can revive her with magic, albeit only on Halloween night after finding a spell that works.

=== Special (2024) ===
| No. overall | No. in season | Title | Directed by | Written by | Original release date |
|---|---|---|---|---|---|
| 21 | – | "This Halloween Needs to Be More Special!" | Adam Parton and Meg Waldow | Charlie Grandy | October 3, 2024 |
As Halloween nears, none of Amber's spells can revive Velma. Thorn has handed a more powerful magic book to the Historical Society. There, staffer Evelyn suggests that the ghost of the Black Knight, a student who was run out of the first Sexy Halloween party and returns to haunt it every year after being pushed off a cliff, has pushed a fellow staffer to her death. The gang steals the spellbook, but they must face their greatest fears for the spell to work. Velma and Daphne encounter the ghost, Jeff, who was wrongly framed by the teens' parents, who chased him away due to his perversion until they tripped, sending him falling to his death. Jeff heard a whisper before his fall, matching the one luring Velma to the spellbook. At the Sexy Halloween party, where Saweetie is performing, the teens conquer their fears and find Evelyn disguised as the Black Knight, who created the myth to keep everyone afraid and empower her black magic, although everyone halts her rampage by acting sexy. Before Velma can save herself, Evelyn pushes Jeff into her triangle, resurrecting him as a zombie. Velma tackles Evelyn, sending them both to Hell, only to abruptly reawaken at her funeral, as Fred used the spellbook to resurrect her, accidentally hypnotizing himself in the process.

== Production and release ==
The series was first announced by HBO Max, on February 10, 2021, alongside the reboot of Clone High. On July 11, 2022, the trademark for the series was listed as abandoned, only for HBO Chief Content Officer Casey Bloys to confirm the series to still be in production in an August memo. Some of the characters are notably raceswapped. In an interview with Entertainment Weekly, Mindy Kaling explains that, "the essence of Velma is not necessarily tied to her whiteness. And I identify so much as her character, and I think so many people do, so it's like, yeah, let's make her Indian in this series." Unlike most Scooby-Doo incarnations, this series does not feature Scooby-Doo himself due to the studio blocking access to the character, combined with the crew struggling to come up with an adult take on him. Matthew Lillard, the current voice of Shaggy Rogers in most Scooby-Doo media, expressed his support for the cast of Velma as opposed to his disappointment of not being cast in Scoob!.

A voice cast was revealed, alongside the release of a teaser trailer on October 6, 2022. That same day, the series was previewed at New York Comic Con. The first two episodes of Velma were released on January 12, 2023, on HBO Max, with the rest of the episodes being released in weekly pairs until February 9, 2023. Notably, the series broke HBO Max's record for the biggest premiere day of an original animated show. The second season was released on April 25, 2024. A Halloween special was released on October 3, 2024. On October 8, 2024, a background artist on the show wrote in a deleted Instagram post that the series was canceled. The next day, (HBO) Max confirmed the series' cancelation.

== Reception ==
=== Critical response ===
Velma received negative reviews from critics. The review aggregator website Rotten Tomatoes reported a 39% approval rating based on 38 critics' reviews. The website's critics consensus reads, "Jinkies! This radical reworking of the beloved Mystery Team has plenty of attitude and style, but it doesn't have the first clue for how to turn its clever subversion into engaging fun." Metacritic, which uses a weighted average, assigned a score of 54 out of 100 based on 17 critics, indicating "mixed or average reviews".

Saloni Gajjar of The A.V. Club gave the show a positive review, praising most of the humor, characterization, storytelling, voice cast, and creative liberties, but stating that sometimes the show falls victim to the tropes it mocks. She concluded the review by saying, "This isn't the Velma we're used to, but it's the Velma we deserve to enjoy today." Darren Franich of Entertainment Weekly was far more negative and gave the show a C, describing it as a "self-aware slog" and "so extra it's minus". He criticized the strong emphasis on pop-culture references and meta humor, and how they tend to bury the few bright spots. Richard Roeper of the Chicago Sun-Times gave it two out of four stars and stated that, "at times the humor is smart and spot-on, but it quickly becomes exhausting. It's as if a team of very clever scribes gathered in a writers' room and recorded everything they said – and then shoehorned all of it into the series."

Liz Shannon Miller of Consequence criticized the show's unbalanced tone, lack of focus, absence of Scooby-Doo, and overstuffed narrative. She also stated the series "feels a bit PG in comparison to other adult animation currently in the works". Conversely, Miller praised the voice acting as well as some of the gags, ending the review by hoping for a second season to iron out its flaws, having noted the show takes a "the first season is really the pilot episode" approach. In a mixed critique, Angie Han of The Hollywood Reporter praised the "thoughtful, emotionally honest" portrayal of Velma herself, but made note of how the show loves to poke fun at televised tropes, yet "seems somewhat less sure of what it has to offer in their stead". She stated how the series' "insistence that it's not like other shows grows thin" and criticized how the cast feels more like "joke machines" than individual characters.

Writing for IGN, Brittany Vincent criticized the series' portrayal of its title character, comparing her to "a biting, hateful version of Daria without the character growth", stating this aspect of the show holds it back from being what it strives to be. She did, however, praise the "side-splitting" comedy and the portrayals of Daphne and Fred, concluding that, "ironically, the series would be exponentially better without its namesake – or at least [with] a version of her with a bit more character growth." Paste Magazine's Rendy Jones gave the series a 5.8 out of 10, praising the art direction and voice performances, but describing the writing as "constantly at war with itself". They also compared it unfavorably to Scooby-Doo! Mystery Incorporated, which they deemed similar in intentions but superior in execution. Joshua Alston of Variety wrote the show is "irreverent to a fault", extolling most of the humor but stating it could belong to any other comedy series. He felt the Mystery Inc. gang was "really unpleasant".

=== Audience response ===
Audience reception to Velma has been overwhelmingly negative. It became one of the lowest-rated television shows on IMDb, receiving similar low scores from audiences on Rotten Tomatoes and Google.

Asyia Iftikhar of PinkNews wrote that the show had been "accused of perpetuating stereotypes against South Asian women, criticised for poor attempts at self-aware comedy and slammed for losing the essence of what people love about the Scooby Doo gang". Brahmjot Kaur of NBC News wrote that the accusations of stereotypes had been rebutted by some who noted characters in other television shows invented by Kaling shared similar personality traits to the titular protagonist, while citing Kaling's past influences. Wired's Amos Barshad wrote that while there were likely still reactions of a racist and homophobic nature targeting the show, the main complaints were for it addressing diversity issues in a "flat, one-note manner", and that the "flippant" portrayal of Velma's sexuality had divided fans. However, when discussing the issue of racial stereotyping in Velma, Lakshmi Srinivas, a professor of Asian American studies at the University of Massachusetts, felt that Kaling was "being held to unfair standards as one of the only representations of South Asian women in the industry".

== Legacy ==
After the series' release and subsequent negative response, in an interview with Emmy Magazine, series creator Charlie Grandy defended the series. He recalled numerous positive experiences working with Kaling while also addressing the changes made to the physical appearances of the main characters. He was reported saying:

"None of these characters are rooted to being white. We were worried about going to Warner Bros. and asking them to do it, but they said, 'Do it. It's time! Just make sure it's funny and good!'"

Velma was later ranked by several publications as one of the worst television series of 2023.

== See also ==
- List of television shows notable for negative reception
