= Charlie Grandy =

American stand-up comedian

Charles Grandy
- Born: Charles Brendan Grandy; New York City, U.S.
- Occupations: Stand-up comedian, television writer, producer
- Years active: 1999–present
- Spouse: Sage Davis (m. 2004)

Charles Grandy is an American stand-up comedian, television writer and producer. He began his career on the television series The Daily Show with Jon Stewart, Saturday Night Live, The Office, Night at the Theatre, and Guys With Kids. Grandy has had a string of collaborations with actress and producer Mindy Kaling through The Mindy Project, Champions, Four Weddings and a Funeral, and The Sex Lives of College Girls. He is the son of former Love Boat star turned politician Fred Grandy.

== Career ==
After working as a stand-up comedian, Grandy turned to television writing and became a writer on Jon Stewart's The Daily Show in 2001. After his Daily Show stint, Grandy became a writer and producer on Saturday Night Live, where he worked until 2008. He worked on the Weekend Update sketch. In the same year, he joined the writing staff of the fifth season of the American version of The Office. At the beginning of the sixth season he became a co-producer and by the time the show entered its seventh season, he had become a supervising producer of the series. After the cancellation of his show, Guys With Kids, he joined his former Office cohort, Mindy Kaling, on the second season of her show, The Mindy Project, as a writer and co-executive producer. In 2018, Grandy and Kaling created the NBC show Champions. He served as an executive producer on Kaling's 2019 miniseries Four Weddings and a Funeral.

He is an executive producer of The Sex Lives of College Girls, another Kaling production, and is credited with writing two episodes.

== Writing credits ==
Year	Title	Notes
2001–2008	Saturday Night Live	127 episodes credited as a writer; 4 episodes credited as "written by"
2008–2012	The Office	Episodes written: 1. Season 5, Episode 5 – "Crime Aid" (October 23, 2008); 2. Season 5, Episode 25 – "Broke" (April 23, 2009); 3. Season 6, Episode 9 – "Double Date (November 5, 2009); 4. Season 6, Episode 18 – "The Delivery, Part Two" (March 4, 2010); 5. Season 7, Episode 3 – "Andy's Play" (October 7, 2010); 6. Season 7, Episode 23 – "The Inner Circle" (May 5, 2011); 7. Season 8, Episode 3 – "Lotto" (October 6, 2011); 8. Season 8, Episode 19 – "Get the Girl" (March 15, 2012)
2013–2014	The Mindy Project	Episodes written: 1. Season 2, Episode 7 – "Sk8er Man" (November 5, 2013); 2. Season 2, Episode 12 – "Danny Castellano Is My Personal Trainer" (January 7, 2014); 3. Season 2, Episode 19 – "Think Like A Peter" (April 15, 2014)
2018	Champions	Episodes written: 1. Season 1, Episode 1 – "Pilot" (March 8, 2018); 2. Season 1, Episode 2 – "I Think I’m Gonna Tolerate It Here" (March 15, 2018); 3. Season 1, Episode 4 – "My Fair Uncle" (April 5, 2018); 4. Season 1, Episode 10 – "Deal or No Deal" (May 25, 2018)
2019	Four Weddings and a Funeral	Episodes written: 1. Season 1, Episode 5 – "Love, Chalet" (August 7, 2019); 2. Season 1, Episode 8 – "Game Night" (August 28, 2019)
2021	The Sex Lives of College Girls	Episodes written: 1. Season 1, Episode 4 - "Kappa" (November 25, 2021); 2. Season 1, Episode 8 - "The Surprise Party" (December 2, 2021)
2023–2024	Velma	Episodes written: 1. Season 1, Episode 1 – "Velma" (January 12, 2023); 2. Season 1, Episode 9 – "Family (Wo)man" (February 9, 2023); 3. Season 1, Episode 10 – "The Brains of the Operation" (February 9, 2023); 4. Season 2, Episode 1 – "The Mystery of Teen Romance" (April 25, 2024); 5. Season 2, Episode 10 – "Til Death" (April 25, 2024)

== Personal life ==
Grandy married Sage Davis in July 2004. He is the son of actor and politician Fred Grandy and his first wife Jan (née Gough); his parents divorced in 1983. Grandy graduated from Harvard University.

== Awards and nominations ==
Grandy has won two Primetime Emmy Awards, one for The Daily Show and the other for Saturday Night Live. In 2009 he received two Writers Guild of America award nominations, one for the fifth season of The Office and another for writing the episode "Broke".
