= Purgatory (2007 film) =

- Directed by: Isma Rubio
- Written by: Isma Rubio; Carlos Calavia
- Produced by: Yolanda Garcia
- Starring: Raul Ferrer; Carlos Calavia; Diana Isis; Sergio Tafalla
- Cinematography: Sergio Moliner
- Edited by: Juan Antonio Rubio
- Music by: Nacho Vera
- Release date: July 29, 2007
- Running time: 10 minutes
- Country: Spain
- Language: Spanish

Purgatory is a short film produced by Goma Films and directed by Spanish filmmaker Isma Rubio. It was released in 2007. The film is a ten minutes long short that depicts a pub that is not what it looks like, halfway between heaven and hell.

== Plot ==
"Three people, very different to each other, live their last experience."

== Awards ==
- Selected Film in 2007 European Short Film Festival FEC Cambrils-Reus (ESP)
- Selected in 2008 Festival Cinema Villa de la Almunia (USA)
