= Erwin Stoff =

Romanian-born American film producer

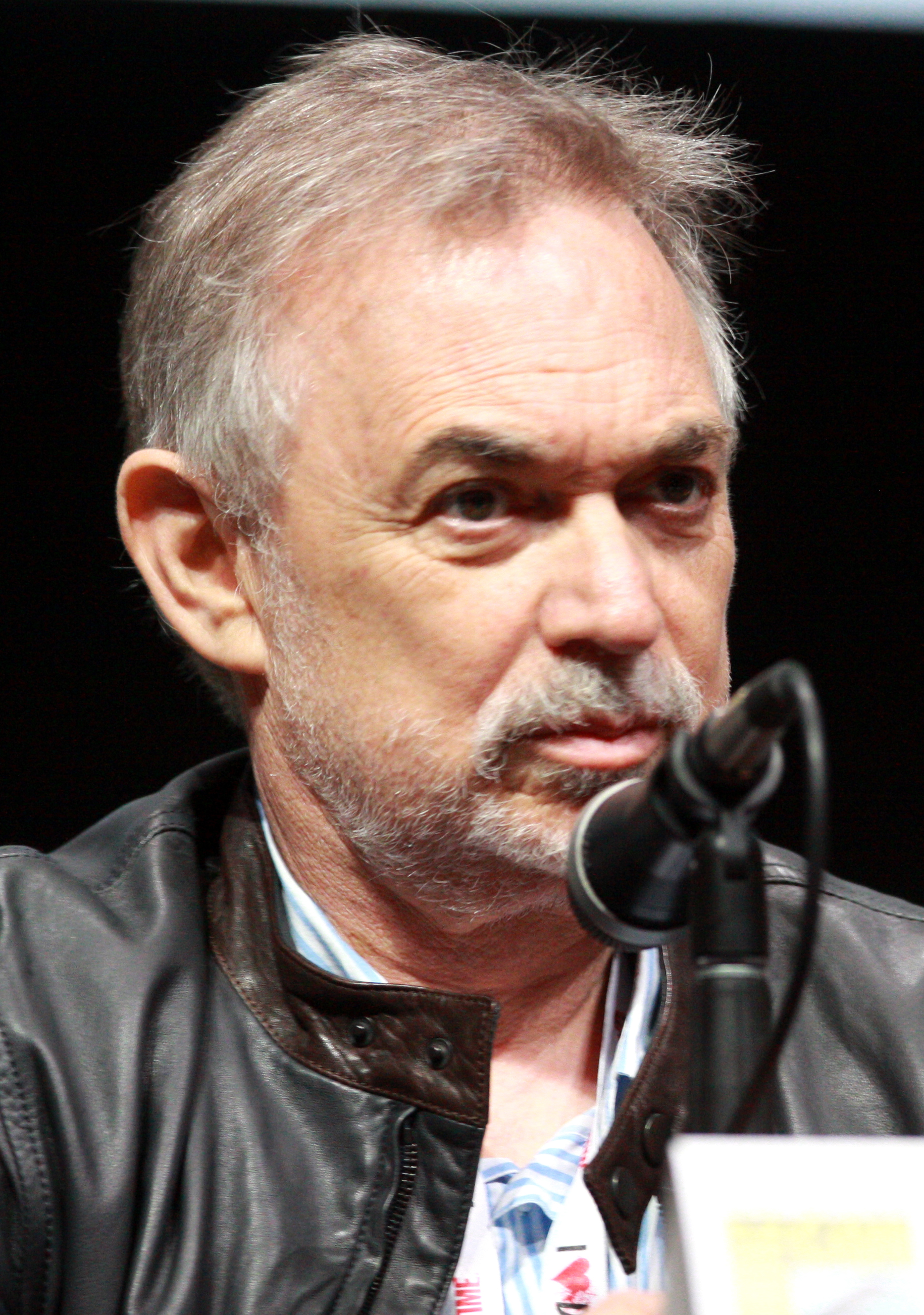
- Erwin Stoff promoting Edge of Tomorrow
- Born: Romania
- Citizenship: United States
- Title: President of 3 Arts Entertainment

Erwin Stoff is an American film producer.

== Career ==
Stoff is best known for being the president of company 3 Arts Entertainment, Inc., based in Beverly Hills, CA. Among his credits are The Matrix, Beautiful Creatures, Edge of Tomorrow, and 13 Hours: The Secret Soldiers of Benghazi. He is of Romanian-Jewish background.

== Filmography ==
=== Film ===
Producer

- Bill & Ted's Bogus Journey (1991) (Co-producer)
- Excessive Force (1993)
- Picture Perfect (1997)
- Sweet November (2001)
- Biker Boyz (2003)
- Constantine (2005)
- Guess Who (2005)
- A Scanner Darkly (2006)
- Street Kings (2008)
- The Day the Earth Stood Still (2008)
- Water for Elephants (2011)
- Beautiful Creatures (2013)
- Edge of Tomorrow (2014)
- Unbroken (2014)
- Burnt (2015)
- 13 Hours: The Secret Soldiers of Benghazi (2016)
- The Call of the Wild (2020)
- Chaos Walking (2021)
- Good Luck, Have Fun, Don't Die (2026)

Executive producer

- Loaded Weapon 1 (1993)
- Chain Reaction (1996)
- Feeling Minnesota (1996)
- The Devil's Advocate (1997)
- The Matrix (1999)
- Austin Powers: The Spy Who Shagged Me (1999)
- The Replacements (2000)
- Hardball (2001)
- The Lake House (2006)
- The Blind Side (2009)
- 47 Ronin (2013)

Assistant director

- A Different Story (1978)

Production executive

- Maxie (1985)

Thanks

- My Own Private Idaho (1991)
- Pete's Meteor (1998)
- Pieces of April (2003)
- Lost in Translation (2003)
- Thumbsucker (2005)

=== Television ===
Producer

- $5.15/Hr. (2004) (TV movie)

Executive producer

- Casebusters (1986) (TV movie)
- Down the Shore (1992−93)
- Queens Supreme (2003)
- Kings (2009)
- Gotham (2012) (TV movie)
- Witches of East End (2013–14)
- Dangerous Liaisons (2014) (TV movie)
- Cocked (2015) (TV movie)
- The Serpent Queen (2022)
- Blue Eye Samurai (2023)
- The Hunting Wives (2025)
