= Howard Klein (TV producer) =

American television producer

Howard Klein is an American television producer and talent manager. He is one of the founding partners in the production and management company 3 Arts Entertainment, alongside Erwin Stoff and Michael Rotenberg. He is best known for being an executive producer of Never Have I Ever, The Sex Lives of College Girls, The Office, Parks and Recreation, King of the Hill and The Mindy Project.

Klein is a two-time Emmy Award winner for The Office and King of the Hill respectively. Some of his other past projects include Emmy-nominated series Carnivale (HBO), The Starter Wife, and Jessica Jones. He is also a producer on Mindy Kaling’s feature Late Night, which premiered at Sundance. The film’s U.S. rights were acquired by Amazon Studios.

Klein started his career as an agent at International Creative Management (ICM) and then worked for the Brillstein Company before leaving to form 3 Arts Entertainment in 1991.

== Filmography ==
Year	Title	Notes
1988	The I'm Exhausted Concert	Executive producer
1990	The Jackie Bison Show	Executive producer
1990	Richard Lewis: I'm Doomed	Executive producer
1991	Lookwell	Co-executive producer
1993	Hexed	Executive producer
1993	Loaded Weapon 1	Executive producer
1994	Galaxy Beat	Executive producer
1996	The Tomorrow Man	Executive producer
1997-2009	King of the Hill	Executive producer, 94 episodes
2000	Dave Chappelle: Killin' Them Softly	Executive producer
2000	Life's Too Short	Co-executive producer
2000	Monsignor Martinez	Executive producer
2003	Greetings from Tucson	Executive producer, 2 episodes
2003-2005	Carnivàle	Executive producer, 24 episodes
2005	Early Bird	Executive producer
2005-2013	The Office	Executive producer, 166 episodes
2006-2008	Off the Record	Executive producer, 2 episodes
2007	The Starter Wife (miniseries)	Executive producer, 6 episodes
2008	The Starter Wife (TV series)	Executive producer, 10 episodes
2009-2020	Parks and Recreation	Executive producer, 125 episodes
2012	Friday Night Dinner	Executive producer
2012-2017	The Mindy Project	Executive producer, 106 episodes
2013	Red Widow	Executive producer, 2 episodes
2015	Mr. Robinson	Executive producer, 6 episodes
2015	Jessica Jones	Executive producer, 13 episodes
2018	The Good Cop	Executive producer, 10 episodes
2019	The Misery Index	Executive producer, 12 episodes
2020	Never Have I Ever	Executive producer, 10 episodes
2020	Upload	Executive producer, 10 episodes
2020	Space Force	Executive producer, 10 episodes
2021	Ordinary Joe	Executive producer, 13 episodes
2021	The Sex Lives of College Girls	Executive producer

== Awards ==
- Primetime Creative Arts Emmy Award for Outstanding Animated Program (King of the Hill-1999)
- Primetime Emmy Award for Outstanding Comedy Series (The Office - 2006)
