= Baking It =

- Genre: Baking; Reality competition
- Created by: Amy Poehler; Nicolle Yaron
- Presented by: Maya Rudolph; Andy Samberg; Amy Poehler
- Country of origin: United States
- Original language: English
- No. of seasons: 2
- No. of episodes: 11

Production
- Executive producers: Amy Poehler; Nicolle Yaron; Pip Wells; Kate Arend; Dave Becky; Andy Samberg; Maya Rudolph
- Running time: 41–49 minutes
- Production companies: Paper Kite Productions; 3 Arts Entertainment; Universal Television Alternative Studio; Open 4 Business Productions

Original release
- Network: Peacock
- Release: December 2, 2021 – January 9, 2023

Related
- Making It

Baking It is an American baking reality competition television series that premiered on Peacock on December 2, 2021.

The main show consists of eight duos competing to create the most well-tasting baked holiday goods. The baked goods are presented to four grandmothers, who are considered to be fond of baking as well.

== Cast ==
- Maya Rudolph
- Andy Samberg (season 1)
- Amy Poehler (season 2)

== Production ==
On May 13, 2021, it was announced that Peacock had ordered a six-part cooking spin-off of Making It. On August 24, 2021, it was announced that Maya Rudolph and Andy Samberg would host the series. On October 28, 2021, it was announced that the series would premiere on December 2, 2021.

On October 25, 2022, it was announced that the series was renewed for a second season, which premiered on December 12, 2022. Additionally, Amy Poehler replaced Samberg as co-host.

== Contestant progress ==
SEASON 2
| Contestants | 1 | 2 | 3 | 4 | 5 |
|---|---|---|---|---|---|
| Reema and Ravi | SAFE | SAFE | SAFE | SAFE | WINNERS |
| Keith and Corey | SAFE | SAFE | SAFE | WIN | RUNNER-UPS |
| Yuki and Omonivie | SAFE | WIN | SAFE | SAFE | RUNNER-UPS |
| Sevn and Kandyy | SAFE | SAFE | WIN | SAFE | RUNNER-UPS |
| Maddie and April | WIN | SAFE | SAFE | OUT | |
| Agnes and George | SAFE | SAFE | OUT | | |
| Allen and Matthew | SAFE | OUT | | | |
| Sydney and Jenna | OUT | | | | |

== Episodes ==
=== Series overview ===
| Season | Episodes | Originally released | |
| Season | Episodes | First released | Last released |
|---|---|---|---|
| 1 | 6 | December 2, 2021 | |
| 2 | 5 | December 12, 2022 | January 9, 2023 |

=== Season 1 (2021) ===
| No. overall | No. in season | Title | Original release date |
|---|---|---|---|
| 1 | 1 | "Holidays Your Way" | December 2, 2021 |
| 2 | 2 | "Baking Memories" | December 2, 2021 |
| 3 | 3 | "Gifts and Games" | December 2, 2021 |
| 4 | 4 | "Gingerbread Hopes and Dreams" | December 2, 2021 |
| 5 | 5 | "Holiday Hacks and Pies" | December 2, 2021 |
| 6 | 6 | "Christmas Fest" | December 2, 2021 |

=== Season 2 (2022–23) ===
| No. overall | No. in season | Title | Original release date |
|---|---|---|---|
| 7 | 1 | "Bake, Bake, BOOM!" | December 12, 2022 |
| 8 | 2 | "Bake Your Fears" | December 19, 2022 |
| 9 | 3 | "Granny's Got a Brand-New Bake" | December 26, 2022 |
| 10 | 4 | "2 Sweet 2 Savory: Crustastrophe" | January 2, 2023 |
| 11 | 5 | "Explosive Master Bakes" | January 9, 2023 |

== Special (2022) ==
| Title | Original release date | U.S. viewers (millions) |
|---|---|---|
| "Maya Rudolph and Amy Poehler's Celebrity Holiday Special" | December 12, 2022 | 2.48 |
Celebrities include: Kristen Bell, J.B. Smoove, Fred Armisen and Nicole Richie

== Reception ==
In 2022, the writers of the series (Neil Casey, Jessica McKenna, Zach Reino, and Niccole Thurman) won the Writers Guild of America Award in the category "Quiz and Audience Participation".
