= Nicolle Yaron =

American television producer and writer

- Occupations: Television producer showrunner writer
- Years active: 2000s–present
- Notable work: The Voice (2011–2014); Making It (2018–2021); Baking It (2021–2023)
- Awards: Primetime Emmy Award (2013)

Nicolle Yaron is an American television producer, showrunner, and writer. Known for her work in unscripted, variety, and live-event programming, Yaron won a Primetime Emmy Award in 2013 as a co-executive producer for NBC's singing competition The Voice and received additional Emmy nominations in 2012 and 2014. Yaron is also the co-creator of the craft-competition series Making It and its spin-off, Baking It.

== Career ==
Yaron began her television career after joining the late-night talk show Last Call with Carson Daly. Initially specializing in late-night and talk-show formats, she transitioned into live-event production, contributing to broadcasts including the Primetime Emmy Awards, People's Choice Awards, MTV Movie Awards, and NBC's New Year's Eve specials.

In 2011, Yaron entered reality television competition with NBC's The Voice. At The Voice, she helped develop the first-ever real-time Live Vote and audience-engagement features such as the "Twitter Save." After leaving The Voice, she executive-produced ABC’s interactive singing competition Rising Star and Fox's comedy series World's Funniest Fails. She served as a consulting producer at the 88th Academy Awards.

Yaron co-created and executive-produced the Emmy-nominated Making It (2018), a craft competition hosted by Amy Poehler and Nick Offerman. The series received critical acclaim and was nominated for multiple Primetime Emmy Awards, including the Outstanding Host for a Reality or Reality-Competition Program in 2021 and 2022. Following Making It, she co-created the Emmy-nominated Baking It (2021), a baking competition hosted by Maya Rudolph and Andy Samburg, and later Rudolph and Amy Poehler. Baking It received a Writers Guild of America Award in 2022 and 2023, and was again nominated in 2024.

She also co-created and executive-produced Real Country, a music-talent competition featuring Shania Twain and Jake Owen on USA Network.

In 2020, Yaron created and executive-produced HBO Max’s Haute Dog, a comedic dog-grooming competition hosted by Matt Rogers.

Yaron is also the author of the newsletter Extremely Helpful, which covers self-development, culture, and media.

== Awards and recognition ==
- Producers Guild of America Award: Winner, Outstanding Producer of Competition Television for The Voice
- Primetime Emmy Awards:
  - Nominee, Outstanding Host for a Reality or Reality-Competition Program for Making It (2022, 2023)
  - Nominee, Outstanding Reality Competition Program for Baking It (2022)
- Writers Guild of America Award: Winner, Comedy/Variety – Quiz and Audience Participation for Baking It (2022, 2023); nominee (2024)
- RealScreen Award: Winner, Best Competition: Lifestyle for Making It (2020)
