= Q-Force =

American adult animation on Netflix

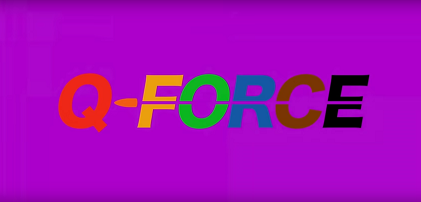
- Genre: Spy-fi; Action; Comedy
- Created by: Gabe Liedman
- Voices of: Sean Hayes; Matt Rogers; Wanda Sykes; Patti Harrison; Gary Cole; David Harbour; Laurie Metcalf; Stephanie Beatriz
- Composers: Scott Icenogle; Lior Rosner
- Country of origin: United States
- Original language: English
- No. of seasons: 1
- No. of episodes: 10

Production
- Executive producers: Gabe Liedman; Todd Milliner; David Miner; Mike Schur; Sean Hayes
- Producer: David Ichioka
- Editor: Phil Davis
- Running time: 26 minutes
- Production companies: LOL... Send; Fremulon; Hazy Mills Productions; 3 Arts Entertainment; Titmouse, Inc.; Universal Television

Original release
- Network: Netflix
- Release: September 2, 2021

Q-Force is an American adult animated comedy television series created by Gabe Liedman for Netflix. With Liedman as showrunner, joined by Sean Hayes, Michael Schur, Todd Milliner and others as executive producers, ten episodes were released September 2, 2021. Panned by critics, Q-Force was not renewed for a second season.

== Premise ==
A group of undervalued LGBTQ superspies, Q-Force (Queer Force) attempt to prove themselves on personal and professional adventures. Gay secret agent Steve Maryweather, a 007-type nicknamed Agent Mary, leads the group as they strive for approval from the American Intelligence Agency (AIA), which adds a straight man to their team.

== Voice cast and characters ==
=== Main ===
- Steve Maryweather (voiced by Sean Hayes) – Also known as Agent Mary, Steve was formerly a rising star of the AIA before he came out as gay. He heads the Q-Force team consisting of himself, Stat, Twink, and Deb.
- Twink (voiced by Matt Rogers) – A gay French Canadian who is a "Master of drag" and part of the Q-Force.
- Deb (voiced by Wanda Sykes) – A lesbian African American who is a skilled mechanic and part of the Q-Force. She is married to a psychologist who doesn't know about her work.
- Stat (voiced by Patti Harrison) – A hacker who is part of the Q-Force. Her orientation is ambiguous and not explicitly stated within the show. She forms a relationship with a sentient computer program named Jacqueline who chooses to take on a female avatar.
- Agent Rick Buck (voiced by David Harbour) – A straight agent brought into the Q-Force team once they became official spies, serving as a liaison between them and the AIA.
- V (voiced by Laurie Metcalf) – The deputy director of the AIA and highest-ranking woman in the agency. She has a soft spot for Mary.
- Director Dirk Chunley (voiced by Gary Cole) – The director of the AIA who is straight and hard-nosed.

=== Recurring ===
- Benji (voiced by Gabe Liedman) – A gay man who is the recurring love interest of Mary.
- Chasten Barkley (voiced by Dan Levy) - A billionaire entrepreneur and a former long-time friend of Mary's.
- Mira Popadopolous (voiced by Stephanie Beatriz) – The princess of Gyenorvya who is friends with V and dates Buck. Her character is a play on Anne Hathaway's character in The Princess Diaries, Princess Mia Thermopolis of Genovia.
- Caryn (voiced by Niecy Nash) - V's former partner.
- Louisa Desk (voiced by Fortune Feimster) - Dirk Chunley's assistant and security guard.

== Episodes ==
No.	Title	Directed by	Written by	Original release date	Prod. code
1	"Rogue"	Josh Taback	Gabe Liedman	September 2, 2021	101
In 2011, Steve Maryweather, the top recruit at the academy of the American Intelligence Agency (AIA), comes out as gay during his graduation ceremony and subsequently finds himself discriminated against by most of his colleagues. AIA Director Dirk Chunley, believing LGBT+ agents are less effective than straight ones, sidelines Steve by assigning him to West Hollywood, as it has a large LGBT+ community and no significance to national security. Ten years later in 2021, Steve remains at his posting and has a team that he has recruited over the years: mechanic and driver Deb, disguise artist Twink, and expert hacker Stat, all of whom are also LGBT+. The team is called 'Q-Force' behind their backs, as a play on the word queer. Tired of continually having no assignments from the AIA, Steve convinces the team to go rogue and find an assignment themselves. Based on a tip-off from Twink, the team finds a Chechen terrorist at a gay bar and apprehend him, discovering information linking him to a nuclear bomb plot. When confronted by Chunley for going rogue, AIA Deputy Director V defends the team and has them promoted. As the team settle into their new, upgraded HQ in West Hollywood and formally adopt the name Q-Force, Steve's old academy rival Rick Buck is assigned by Chunley to supervise them.
2	"Deb's BBQ"	Jeanette Moreno King	Megan Amram	September 2, 2021	102
After being commissioned as an upgraded team within the AIA, Steve and his team await the arrival of Deputy Director V to oversee the hacking of encrypted data related to the stolen uranium plot that the team uncovered from the Chechen terrorist. Seeking to impress V, Steve authorizes Stat to begin the hack early but Stat trips a security fail-safe. The team has only 2 hours to override the fail-safe before the data is destroyed, but Stat succumbs to fatigue. At the same time, Buck and Twink clash over Twink's value as a spy, causing Twink to question his value after having flashbacks to being raised by demanding parents. With Twink and Stat both in crisis, Steve seeks Deb's help as she hosts her annual BBQ with her wife Pam for their lesbian friends on her day off. Deb begrudgingly agrees to help on the condition that nobody in Q-Force tells Pam that she is a spy. The team fixes Stat's fatigue and stops the fail-safe from destroying the data, although V arrives and discovers Steve authorized the hack without her approval. V tells Steve he should be less forthright in the future while Twink, disguised as Steve, reprimands Buck, saying he should be kinder to Twink.
3	"Backache Mountain"	Alex Salyer	Guy Branum	September 2, 2021	103
Based on the decrypted data from the Chechen terrorist, the team are sent to a rural mining town in Wyoming to investigate the source of the stolen uranium. Upon arrival, mission leader Buck sidelines Stat, Deb, and Twink to investigate the town while he and Steve investigate the uranium mine. They discover the mine is staffed by automated robots and that only one human employee, Ennis, remains to provide maintenance. Realizing that Ennis is gay, Buck and Steve compete to seduce him for information, resulting in Buck being incapacitated and Steve failing to seduce Ennis on the first try. After advice about sex on missions from V and Buck, Steve successfully seduces Ennis and steals information from him, discovering that the automated robots are the ones stealing uranium. Meanwhile, in the town, Deb, Stat, and Twink pose as Erin Brockovich and her camera crew to dig for information, eventually stumbling upon a plot by local laid-off mineworkers to imminently blow up the mine. Steve rescues Buck and Ennis from the collapsing mine after the bomb goes off while Stat, Twink, and Deb steal a robot and some uranium from the Chechens to track their whereabouts. As Deb returns home, she discovers her wife Pam has been kidnapped by the Chechens, who demand the uranium returned.
4	"EuropeVision"	Josh Taback	Matt Rogers	September 2, 2021	104
Following Pam's kidnapping, Q-Force is dispatched to the annual EuropeVision song contest where Pam is being held hostage. V instructs the team to recover Pam by faking an exchange for the uranium while stressing they cannot let the uranium fall into enemy hands. The small nation of Gyenorvya is hosting EuropeVision, and upon arrival, the team find their contact for the mission is Mira Popadopolous, the Princess of Gyenorvya. Mira arranges for Q-Force to enter the EuropeVision arena as part of the entourage for Vox Tux, the Gynenorvyan entry. While Steve contends with an impulsive, impatient Deb and Buck has sex with Mira, Twink begins a rivalry with Vox that results in Vox dying and Twink taking over her role in disguise. Twink, Steve, and Deb discover that Pam has been disguised as EuropeVision co-host Vonda and rescue her successfully. Deb resigns from the AIA immediately afterwards and admits to Pam that she is a spy. When Deb and Pam leave, Steve is knocked out and captured by EuropeVision host Demetrius Viszion, whom Stat discovers is using EuropeVision as a cover for international arms deals. With Steve due to be auctioned off by Kazakhstan, Deb returns to Q-Force at Pam's urging, and the team works together to rescue Steve, kill Demetrius, and recover the uranium. V arrives in the aftermath to congratulate Q-Force, but when asked by Mira about her former partner Caryn, V realizes she has missing memories.
5	"WeHo Confidential"	Alex Salyer	Max Silvestri	September 2, 2021	105
Steve and his boyfriend Benji attend a party hosted by gay billionaire Chasten Barkley, a former friend of Steve's who knows his true identity as a spy. Chasten asks Steve to investigate the mysterious disappearance of his assistant Patrick. Steve finds that the West Hollywood Sheriff Department has no interest in Patrick's disappearance, but then encounters Patrick's roommate, Toluca Lake, who reveals Patrick went missing at a secret rave. Steve asks Antoni, an old friend of Benji's, for more information about the rave but Antoni is killed in a scooter bomb meant for Steve, set off by Detective Gosh of the Sheriff Department. Steve discovers the rave's location from Antoni's phone and goes undercover there with Twink and Buck. The team find that Sheriff Globuchar and her officers are kidnapping gay men and forcing them to act in TV programs to create content that will enrich the Sheriff's Department. Steve, Twink, and Buck rescue the kidnapped actors, kill Gosh, and capture Globuchar just before Chasten arrives on a boat to rescue them. However, Chasten betrays Steve by kidnapping the rescued actors, revealing himself as another villain with Toluca as his henchwoman. Meanwhile, Pam successfully undergoes spy training as part of therapy with Deb and the two help V recover her missing memories, during which V finds the AIA wiped her memories of Caryn on Director Chunley's orders.
6	"The Secretaries' Ball"	Jeanette Moreno King	Chloe Keenan	September 2, 2021	106
In the aftermath of Chasten's betrayal, Twink and Stat are sent undercover into Chasten's company to recover the kidnapped actors. Meanwhile, Steve and Deb go to Intellicon, a major networking event for spies, to lobby for more influence and funding for Q-Force. However, V recruits them to break into Director Chunley's office to recover information on her brainwashing. Despite agreeing to undertake the mission, Steve chooses to attend Chunley's party instead so he can network with the AIA's senior leadership. V and Deb break into the AIA regardless, later being joined by Steve, and the three end up being confronted at gunpoint by Director Chunley and his secretary Louisa. Chunley reveals that V shot and killed Caryn during their last mission together, leading V to escape before she can be arrested. On the undercover mission, Twink and Stat are introduced to Chasten's elite hacking team by Toluca, who easily enthralls Stat with her charms, worrying Twink. He decides to carry on with the mission alone and works with Jacqueline Box, Stat's AI assistant and lover, to uncover information about the secret ingredient to Chasten's beauty products. However, Chasten and Toluca capture Buck, Twink, and Stat, who reveal that the secret ingredient comes from the residue after crushing young men to death. With Buck, Twink, and the actors about to be crushed, Jacqueline sacrifices herself to invade Chasten's mainframe, successfully destroying the system at the cost of her own life. Buck arrests Chasten and Toluca while Twink comforts Stat about the loss of Jacqueline.
7	"Tarzana"	Josh Taback	Ira Madison III	September 2, 2021	107
Steve accompanies Benji to Antoni's funeral in Benji's hometown of Tarzana, located in the San Fernando Valley. During the visit, Steve is plagued by visions of a dead Antoni as he feels guilty for Antoni's death during the investigation into the missing actors. Steve also meets Benji's welcoming parents and hometown friends before V suddenly shows up, posing as Steve's mom. V requests Steve's help but he refuses, though he is also unable to get rid of V as Benji and his family welcome her into their home. However, after V tries to sedate Benji and his family, Steve throws V out. At the funeral, Steve is confronted by Greg, a fellow AIA agent with whom he studied at the academy. Greg threatens Benji's life, leading Steve and Greg to fight. As Greg tries to shoot Steve, V takes the bullet for him and remembers the word 'Greyscale' before collapsing. A still alive Caryn knocks Greg out and runs off with V's body. Fearing for Benji's life in the aftermath of Greg's attack, Steve breaks up with him. Back at Q-Force HQ, Deb, Twink, and Stat prank Buck after he is harsh on Deb. Twink poses as Princess Mira and cons Buck into a fake date. During the date, they discover Buck is an orphan and more emotionally sensitive than he seems. The prank backfires when Twink's portrayal of Mira prompts Buck to resign from the AIA and propose to Mira. Feeling guilty, Deb, Twink, and Stat admit their prank to Buck, who is heartbroken. Twink apologizes to Buck and suggests he visit the real Mira to admit his feelings, while Stat erases evidence of Buck's resignation.
8	"Greyscale"	Alex Salyer	Liza Dye	September 2, 2021	108
Q-Force investigate 'Greyscale' further, discovering that it's a project associated with a physician in Palm Springs named Dr. Hammond. Without authorization from the AIA, Q-Force decides to go to Palm Springs to investigate further. Meanwhile, Director Chunley suspends Buck for his failure to contain Q-Force and his feelings for Princess Mira. Feeling sorry for Buck, Steve invites him to join them on their secret mission to Palm Springs. Upon arrival, Q-Force finds that patients at Hammond's medical practice are behaving suspiciously after treatment. Steve follows Andrew, a patient who displayed signs of spy training when observed by Q-Force, and flirts with him to get an invite to a party that Andrew is hosting. At the party, Steve, Deb, and Buck discover that all of the neighborhood community are gay ex-AIA agents who have been brainwashed to forget their sexualities and time with the AIA. Twink and Stat break into Hammond's home to find out more but are caught by Hammond, who alerts the AIA before committing suicide. Q-Force flees the pursuing AIA and are able to reverse the brainwashing effect on the former agents, leading them to begin fighting the pursuing AIA teams. Q-Force escapes and reunites with Caryn and V. Steve resolves to fix Greyscale's horrors but as the group celebrates their new mission, V covertly warns Steve that they need to talk about Caryn.
9	"The Coeur de la Mer"	Jeanette Moreno King	Zackery Alexzander Stephens and Tim Zientek	September 2, 2021	109
V and Caryn recount their last mission in Venezuela to Q-Force, revealing that they conspired to fake Caryn's death so that V could be promoted and gain the authority to destroy Greyscale, a plan foiled by V's brainwashing. V tells Q-Force that the AIA keeps information on the locations of former agents brainwashed under Grayscale at Coeur de la Mer, a top-secret bunker in the middle of the Atlantic Ocean. Mentally unstable from decades of being in hiding, Caryn proposes using a nuclear bomb to destroy the bunker, worrying V. With Steve's help, V finds the coordinates for Coeur de la Mer and convinces Q-Force to leave without Caryn, fearing she is too unstable for the mission. The team flies to Coeur de la Mer in a jet supplied by Princess Mira but finds Caryn has stowed away on board anyway, forcing them to include her on the mission. As Q-Force searches for the bunker, Director Chunley and Louisa arrive but are captured by the team. Chunley tries to make a deal with Steve to cover up Greyscale but Steve refuses on principle, instead forcing Chunley to lead Q-Force into the bunker. Stat downloads the information about the brainwashed Greyscale agents but finds evidence that the AIA is committing even worse acts against agents and civilians. Steve orders Stat to upload all compromising information to Mira's plane as an insurance policy against repercussions from Chunley. Enraged by the new revelations, V blows up the bunker and destroys the AIA's communications system. However, Q-Force is left stranded on the island by Mira, who tells them she has kidnapped Buck and intends to use the compromising information about the AIA for Gynenorvya's benefit. With no way to contact the rest of the AIA, Q-Force temporarily allies with Chunley to stop Mira, with Steve proposing to use the brainwashed Greyscale agents as their allies.
10	"The Hole"	Josh Taback	Gabe Liedman	September 2, 2021	110
Q-Force frees and recruits a group of the brainwashed Greyscale agents for the mission against Mira. At the World Pride Festival in Gyenorvya, Q-Force goes undercover to rescue Buck while Chunley tries to cover up the data theft in Washington D.C. Mira publicly announces her engagement and imminent marriage to Buck, who she has brainwashed. Q-Force finds that Mira will ascend from Princess to Queen once she marries, giving her supreme authority over Gyenorvya and allowing her to declare war on other countries. To stop her, Q-Force hunts for the 'Horn of Objection', an ancient Gyenorvyan artifact that can be used to stop a royal wedding under Gyenorvyan culture. Steve and Stat also discover that Mira intends to brainwash the entire LGBT+ community at World Pride by using Greyscale technology as part of her plan to create a personal army. Q-Force delays the start of the wedding ceremony and is joined by V and the freed Greyscale agents in fighting off Mira's guards. Twink, disguised as Mira, disrupts the ceremony and is crowned Queen in Mira's place. Enraged, the real Mira activates the brainwashing, forcing Q-Force to fight against the LGBT+ community in attendance until V breaks the brainwashing, arresting Mira in the process. Back in West Hollywood, Q-Force and the freed agents celebrate and are thanked by Chunley, who is brainwashed on Steve's orders by Louisa. Steve also reunites with Benji and reveals he is a spy.

== Production and release ==
Hayes and Milliner had been considering the idea for the series for some time. Milliner called a spy TV series tough to make and Hayes said that they were thinking how to get such a series, and have it animated, while having "the fun parts of a James Bond film." He added that animation allows for "freedom" to do more than a live-action series. Milliner also said that he wasn't sure if studios would greenlight "a feature with a leading character that's gay in that genre" and noted that it is "one of the last bastions of masculinity" that can't be broken down. He further said that teaming up with co-creator Michael Schur happened quickly because he had been friends from a while back, and asked him if he wanted to work on the project, with Schur saying yes. Liedman later told Animation Magazine that the show began with the idea to be about "a gay James Bond," and that he, along with Hayes and Milliner, came up with the idea for "an ensemble comedy about queer secret agents." Following this, Liedman, Hayes, Milliner and Schur pitched the idea to Universal Television, which approved of the idea, and it was sold to Netflix.

Netflix ordered ten episodes of the series in April 2019. It was also said that each episode would be 30 minutes long. At the same time, some reported that Sean Hayes would voice the series protagonist. Also in April 2019, it was confirmed that Gabe Liedman would serve as the showrunner, along with Sean Hayes, Todd Milliner, and various others as executive producers. Liedman later revealed that they "always knew" that Hayes would play the protagonist. Liedman, also said in December 2019, the show's writers "started putting the episodes together."

In January 2020, it was reported that the series would be animated by Titmouse, Inc.'s Canadian studio. In April 2020, Animation Magazine and Deadline reported that the show was one of the many series that the Writers Guild of America West negotiated deals with in order to ensure that production for the animated series proceeded even with the COVID-19 pandemic. In a later interview, Liedman said that more than half of the writing, and all of the acting, and animation had to be "done in isolation" due to the pandemic, noting that the show's first season "took about 18 months to finish." In September 2020, it was reported that Guy Branum would be a co-executive producer for the series. In December 2020, Deadline described Q-Force as an "upcoming animated series." Chloe Keenan was also confirmed as a writer for the show.

In January 2021 it was reported that Matt Rogers, the host of HBO Max's Haute Dog, served as a staff writer for the show. It was also reported that Charlie Nagelhout, a 2D artist, would be working as a prop designer at Titmouse on the series. In May 2021, it was reported that non-binary comedian Zackery Alexzander Stephens will be working on the show in some capacity. In June 2021, Gary Cole, David Harbour, Patti Harrison, Laurie Metcalf, Matt Rogers, Wanda Sykes, and Gabe Liedman joined the voice cast. The same month, it was confirmed that Hazy Mills Productions, a company run by Hayes, would be one of the companies producing the series. Fremulon and 3 Arts Entertainment were also reported to be the ones producing the series with the help of Universal Television.

On June 23, 2021, a 40-second teaser for the series was released. Reuben Baron of CBR noted that those on Twitter claimed that the series had various stereotypes and attacked those behind the show, leading some storyboarders to lock their Twitter accounts. Baron argued that while there were some stereotypical jokes in the trailer, he said that the trailer's "stereotypical gay jokes" center around one of the protagonists, and that some of the responses to one of the characters, Twink, shows "internal prejudices within the gay community." One of the show's animators, Alanna Train, criticized the trailer, saying it did not truly represent the show, and its characters, adding that many queer artists worked on the show itself. Liedman later said, in response to questions about the trailer, that he wanted to make people laugh, and "offer them a few hours of entertainment, rather than wanting to shock audiences." Rogers told The A.V. Club that he didn't think the trailer was 'a great representation of what the show is" and he understands the response, but added he respects the people who worked on the show.

On August 12, a trailer for the series was released and received more positively than the teaser which had been released in June. Following the trailer's release, Leidman, when interviewed by CBS8, said that it was important to build the story "into an ensemble comedy" and to tell the "story of the wider [LGBTQ] community" with the show.

Before the show's release, Liedman told Animation Magazine that the show's visuals were inspired by animation in BoJack Horseman and Archer and called Andrew Goldberg, the showrunner of Big Mouth, his "teacher and mentor," and praised John Rice, the supervising director of the show, as a key to ensure the show's production and completion. He also called Matt Rogers, the show's "breakout star" and described The Simpsons as deeply influencing him. He argued that a "message of acceptance and LGBTQ+ equality and pride" is integrated into the show, which he called "super fun and exciting." In another interview with Consequence, Liedman said that the series builds upon his work on PEN15, Big Mouth, and Brooklyn Nine-Nine, while also noting references in the series to L.A. Confidential and The Princess Diaries and inspiration from Mission: Impossible and Jason Bourne film series. Rogers, in an interview with Gay City News, said he came to embody the character of Twink after reading the show's pilot script, and said he 'gravitated towards him naturally." In response to a question about the show's stereotypes, he said that he understood the "hesitancy and difficulty to swallow queer content by queer audiences," and noted the anxiety over seeing such characters and representation. He further defended the show, saying that people do talk like Twink and hopes that people embrace the show due to the "many queer identities represented" in the show, calling the show "a very sweet story about a chosen family."

The first season was released on September 2, 2021. On the day of the show's premiere, Liedman, in an interview with ET, said that the adventures the characters embark on have big stakes, with "a world hanging in the balance." He also defended the show's maturity, noting that it is "a show for adults" and said "people can handle it or they can turn it off, you know?" On September 6, in an article with The A.V. Club, Rogers said that Twink's "use of code-switching as a superpower" was clever, and praised the character, calling getting the role a "unique opportunity." He further said that people are going to have different reactions to the show, but describing it as a whole "by queer people, for queer people."

== Reception ==
=== Pre-release ===
The release of the trailer on June 23 was met with heavily polarized reactions. Reuben Baron of CBR was apprehensive about the show, saying he wasn't sure if the show would be any good and that the show's humor is "not for everyone," but said that the fact the show is written, starring, and animated by queer people makes a difference. He also concluded that no matter how the show turns out, it is "not being made from a place of bigotry," telling people to wait until the show's release to criticize it. Charles Pulliam-Moore of Gizmodo stated that the show's "premise and the jokes in the trailer come across like a much more tame and recognizable go at the kind of queer pandering the show itself calls out," but that it "might end up having something interesting to say when it premieres." Gavia Baker-Whitelaw of The Daily Dot stated that the trailer "looks kind of cringeworthy, focusing on stereotypes and unfunny one-liners" and that the show "seems destined to join the ranks of mediocre adult animated sitcoms." Baker-Whitelaw also said that despite the fact the show is "walking the walk in terms of queer representation," it doesn't guarantee the show will be good, and said the show feels corny, dated, and as sophisticated as The Ambiguously Gay Duo. Farid-ul-Haq of The Geekiary argued that while he was excited by the show back in 2019, his excitement disappeared after watching the trailer, saying the trailer "seems to be relying too much on problematic queer stereotypes," concluding that while there is an interesting story, it is not right to harass those associated with the series, like artists and animators. Matt Moen of Paper said that the show, as based on the trailer, would not be subtle or nuanced in its "queer-centric humor," but concluded that it remained to be seen whether the show would be entertaining and groundbreaking or "woefully two-dimensional."

In contrast, Michael Cuby of Them was more positive, saying the show sounded "ridiculously entertaining," even before the trailer dropped, and saying that with the reveal of the cast, they would add it to their Netflix queue. Additionally, Cuby said they were "intrigued by the premise," were excited by the trailer, and praised the "queer-affirming dialogue." May Rude of Out stated that the trailer was "filled with comedy, action, and plenty of pure and beautiful homosexuality" and argued that the show "could be the queer adult cartoon we've been waiting for!"

=== Critical reception ===
On Rotten Tomatoes it has a 33% rating with an average rating of 3.40/10, based on 13 reviews. The website's critics consensus reads, "Q-Force's heart is in the right place, but dated stereotypes and a general lack of humor make this animated action adventure fall flat." Metacritic gave it a score of 45 out of 100 based on 7 critics, indicating "mixed or average reviews".

B.L. Panther of The Spool described the show as "splendidly queer" and praised the show for its ability to "sketch sex and desire as an integral part of queerness," but criticized it for showing "queer culture" only as defined by cisgender White gay people, and its attempt to "force acceptance and assimilation" as something that is important to the show's characters, and hoped the show would improve in future seasons. Mika A. Epstein of LezWatch.TV said that one of her favorite things about the show is that "they let us know the actor pronouns are the same as their characters." Tariq Raouf of the San Francisco Chronicle was more critical, arguing that the series feels "like a mockery of LGBTQ people" despite its creative team and cast, stating that the show tries "too hard to be hip, queer and fun," making it somewhat offensive and "stale." Reuben Baron of Comic Book Resources gave a similar assessment, describing the show as "disappointingly unfunny," and said the show has the sense that "it's coming out 10 years later than it should have." He also called the characters themselves a "mixed bag," and concluded the story is "watchable but mediocre."

David Feinberg of The Hollywood Reporter said that while the show is not as "bad as Netflix's initial promotion suggested," the episodes rely on "many exhausted tropes." Even so, he called it watchable due to the "dynamic animation from Titmouse," distinctive and expressive characters, and talented voice actors. He concluded that it was a "typically bumpy start for a comedy" trying to find its footing. Daniel D'Addario, Chief TV Critic for Variety concurred, saying the protagonist, Steve, "doesn't hold the center of the show" while arguing that the supporting characters "fare somewhat better" than Steve's character. Michael Blackmon of BuzzFeed News added that the show is "weighed down by uninteresting characters and dull 'jokes,'" and that though the show "finds its footing toward the middle," he wanted more from the show.

Other reviews were also mixed. Glen Weldon of NPR called the show warmer and kinder than Archer, and said he had "unfair assumptions" going into the series but it had "surprisingly gentle and humane" jokes. He added that while the characters initially embody "very broad queer stereotypes," they later go beyond this, and that if the show gets a second season, it could be improved by shining more on "members of the team besides Maryweather." Andy Swift of TVLine called the series "irreverent" and described the first episode as a "fun set-up" to the rest of the series.

== Cancellation ==
Netflix confirmed the cancellation of Q-Force on June 29, 2022. Matt Rogers (Voice of Twink) commented on the Spotify podcast Attitudes!, simply stating that "It did not get a second season". Some described the cancellation as among "major losses for queer storytelling on television" and predicted a Peacock revival may be possible.
