= Making It Australia =

Arts and crafts television series

- Genre: Reality competition
- Based on: Making It by: Amy Poehler; Nick Offerman
- Presented by: Susie Youssef; Harley Breen
- Judges: Deborah Riley; Benja Harney
- No. of contestants: 13
- Winner: George Buchanan
- Runners-up: Rizaldy Valencia; Jack Stirling
- Country of origin: Australia
- Original language: English
- No. of seasons: 1
- No. of episodes: 12

Production
- Executive producers: Dan Munday; Chris Culvenor; Paul Franklin; Amy Poehler; Nick Offerman; Joe Herdman; Jemma Carlton
- Camera setup: Multi-camera
- Running time: 45-65 minutes
- Production companies: Eureka Productions; Matchbox Pictures

Original release
- Network: Network Ten
- Release: 15 September – 6 November 2021

Making It Australia is a reality competition television series co-hosted by comedians Susie Youssef and Harley Breen and based on the American series of the same name. The series premiered on Wednesday, 15 September 2021 on Network 10.

The show features craftspeople skilled in different media competing to be named the "Master Maker" and win A$100,000. Each week, competitors participate in two or three challenges – a "Faster Craft", a "Together Craft" and a "Master Craft." The winner of each challenge earns a patch. For the Faster Craft, makers have three hours to create an item. For the Together Craft, they a split into teams and work together to create a themed item. For the Master Craft, makers have eight hours to create a more elaborate themed collection. At the end of every episode, one person is sent home based on their performance in the Master Craft.

== Production ==
In October 2020, Network 10 announced that they had commissioned a local version of the show at their annual upfronts. In March 2021, it was announced that Susie Youssef and Harley Breen would be co-hosting the series and that it would be judged by production designer and art director Deborah Riley and paper engineer Benja Harney.

Due to low viewership, the series was bumped from its primetime slot of Wednesday and Thursday nights and began airing on Saturday nights from its seventh episode. At the Network 10 upfronts in October 2021, it was announced that the series had been cancelled.

== Cast ==
=== Hosts ===
- Susie Youssef
- Harley Breen

=== Judges ===
- Deborah Riley
- Benja Harney

=== Contestants ===
Name	Age	Occupation	Residence	Ref.
Georgina "George" Buchanan	41	Prop Maker	Sydney, New South Wales	
Dan Deleur	37	Plumber	Adelaide, South Australia	
Denise Pepper	61	University Lecturer	Perth, Western Australia	
Rizaldy Valencia	55	Animator	Sydney, New South Wales	
Andrew Whitehead	62	Scrap Metal Artist	Urana, New South Wales	
Sai-Wai Foo	46	Fashion Designer	Melbourne, Victoria	
Kat Halligan	22	Children's Entertainer	Adelaide, South Australia	
Stephanie Martinez	45	Mum	Melbourne, Victoria	
Badat Rehana	32	Graphic Designer	Sydney, New South Wales	
Jack Stirling	31	Architect	Melbourne, Victoria	
Will Thomson	22	Apprentice Electrician	Wollongong, New South Wales	
Robert Michael Young	32	Artist	Melbourne, Victoria	
Russell Zorino-Brown	32	Costume Maker	Melbourne, Victoria	

== Contestant progress ==
Season 1
Contestants	Specialty	1	2	3	4	5	6	7	8	9	10	11	12
George	Prop Maker	Safe	Safe	FAST	WIN	Safe	Safe	Safe	MEGA	Safe	Safe	BOTH	WINNER
Rizaldy	Toy Maker	Safe	WIN	Safe	TOGT	Safe	Safe	FAST	Safe	FAST	MEGA	Safe	RUNNER UP
Jack	Architecture	FAST	Safe	Safe	Safe	Safe	MEGA	Safe	Safe	Safe	Safe	Safe	RUNNER UP
Rehana	Jewellery/Fabrics	Safe	TOGT	Safe	Safe	WIN	Safe	WIN	Safe	Safe	Safe	OUT	
Will	Woodwork	Safe	Safe	Safe	Safe	Safe	Safe	Safe	Safe	WIN	OUT		
Andrew	Sculptor	Safe	Safe	Safe	Safe	FAST	Safe	Safe	WITH				
Denise	Sculptor	Safe	TOGT	Safe	Safe	Safe	Safe	OUT					
Dan	Metalwork	Safe	TOGT	Safe	TOGT	Safe	OUT						
Robert	Artist	WIN	Safe	Safe	Safe	OUT							
Sai-Wai	Mixed Media	Safe	Safe	WIN	OUT								
Stephanie	Crafts	Safe	Safe	OUT									
Russell	Costume Maker	Safe	OUT										
Kat	Textiles	OUT											

(FAST) The Contestant won that episode's Faster Craft Challenge.
(TOGT) The Contestant's team won that episode's Together Craft Challenge.
(WIN) The Contestant won that episode's Master Craft Challenge.
(MEGA) The Contestant won that episode's Mega Craft Challenge.
(BOTH) The Contestant won both that episode's Faster Craft Challenge and Master Craft Challenge.
(OUT) The Contestant won that episode’s Faster Craft or Together Craft Challenge but was eliminated from the competition during the Master Craft Challenge.
(OUT) The Contestant was eliminated from the competition.
(WITH) The Contestant withdrew from the competition.
(SAFE) The Contestant won neither the Faster Craft Challenge nor Master Craft Challenge, and they were not eliminated.
(WINNER) The Contestant was named Master Maker.
(WINNER) The Contestant won the Faster Craft Challenge and was then named Master Maker.
(RUNNER UP) The contestant was runner-up.

== Special guests ==
- Tonia Todman – Episode 9

== Season synopsis ==
No.	Title	Air date	Timeslot	Overnight ratings		Ref(s)
No.	Title	Air date	Timeslot	Viewers	Rank	Ref(s)
1	Episode 1	15 September 2021	7:30pm Wednesday	474,000	14	
2	Episode 2	16 September 2021	7:30pm Thursday	401,000	15	
3	Episode 3	22 September 2021	7:30pm Wednesday	325,000	15	
4	Episode 4	23 September 2021	7:30pm Thursday	347,000	19	
5	Episode 5	29 September 2021	7:30pm Wednesday	289,000	—N/a	
6	Episode 6	30 September 2021	7:30pm Thursday	341,000	18	
7	Episode 7	2 October 2021	6:00pm Saturday	135,000	—N/a	
8	Episode 8	9 October 2021	6:00pm Saturday	—N/a	—N/a	
9	Episode 9	16 October 2021	6:00pm Saturday	—N/a	—N/a	
10	Episode 10	23 October 2021	6:00pm Saturday	—N/a	—N/a	
11	Semi Final	30 October 2021	6:00pm Saturday	—N/a	—N/a	
12	Grand Finale	6 November 2021	6:00pm Saturday	113,000	—N/a	

== See also ==
- List of Australian television series
- Making It (TV series)
- Anh's Brush with Fame
- The Great Australian Bake Off
- The Mix
