= Jax Media =

American media company

- Type: Subsidiary
- Industry: Film; Television
- Founded: 2011; 15 years ago
- Founders: Tony Hernandez; Lilly Burns; John Skidmore
- Headquarters: New York City, New York, United States
- Key people: Brooke Posch (president)
- Services: Film production; Television production
- Parent: Imagine Entertainment (2018–present)
- Website: jaxmedia.com

Jax Media is an American film and television production company co-founded by Tony Hernandez, Lilly Burns, and John Skidmore. It is known for producing long-running series Broad City, Difficult People, Younger, and Inside Amy Schumer.

In February 2018, Imagine Entertainment acquired a controlling stake in Jax Media.

== Filmography ==
=== Television ===
==== Current ====
Year	Title	Network	Notes	Ref.
2018–present	My Next Guest Needs No Introduction with David Letterman	Netflix	with Worldwide Pants, RadicalMedia, and Zero Point Zero Production	
2020–present	Emily in Paris	Netflix	with Darren Star Productions and Paramount Television Studios (Note: Credited as MTV Studios for season 1 and MTV Entertainment Studios for seasons 2–4)	

==== Former ====
Year	Title	Network	Notes	Ref.
2013–2022	Inside Amy Schumer	Comedy Central (seasons 1-4); Paramount+ (season 5)	with So Easy Productions, Irony Point, Comedy Partners and MTV Entertainment Studios	
2014–2019	Broad City	Comedy Central	with 3 Arts Entertainment, Paper Kite Productions and Comedy Partners	
2015–2016	The Jim Gaffigan Show	TV Land	with Fedora Entertainment, Brillstein Entertainment Partners, Burrow Owl Productions, Chimichanga Productions, Inc., Sony Pictures Television, TV Land Original Productions	
2015–2017	Difficult People	Hulu	with 3 Arts Entertainment, Paper Kite Productions and Universal Cable Productions	
2015–2017	Odd Mom Out	Bravo	with Rottenberg-Zuritsky Productions, Piro Vision and Left/Right Productions	
2015	Eye Candy	MTV	with Blumhouse Television and MTV Production Development	
2015–2021	Younger	TV Land (seasons 1-6); Paramount+ / Hulu (season 7)	with Darren Star Productions and TV Land Original Productions	
2016–2018	Loosely Exactly Nicole	MTV; Facebook Watch	with 3 Arts Entertainment	
2016–2022	Search Party	TBS (seasons 1-2); HBO Max (seasons 3-5)	with Quiet and Considerate Productions, Semi-Formal Productions. Inc and Studio T	
2016–2022	Full Frontal with Samantha Bee	TBS	with Randy & Pam's Quality Entertainment	
2016	Netflix Presents: The Characters	Netflix	with Netflix	
2016–2019	The Detour	TBS	with TBS Productions, Randy & Pam's Quality Entertainment, Studio T and Nomadic Productions	
2017–2018	The Rundown with Robin Thede	BET	with For Better or Words Inc. and Enterprises Inc.	
2017–2019	Nobodies	TV Land; Paramount Network	with On the Day Productions	
2018	Roseanne	ABC	with Mohawk Productions and The Carsey-Werner Company	
2018–2025	The Conners	ABC	with Mohawk Productions and Werner Entertainment	
2019–2023	The Other Two	Comedy Central (season 1); HBO Max (seasons 2-3)	with Broadway Video, Comedy Partners and MTV Entertainment Studios	
2019–2022	Russian Doll	Netflix	with Paper Kite Productions, 3 Arts Entertainmenr and Universal Television	
2019–2022	Desus & Mero	Showtime	with Bodega Boy's Original and Chopped Cheese	
2019–2022	South Side	Comedy Central (season 1); HBO Max (seasons 2-3)	with HBO Max	
2019–2023	A Black Lady Sketch Show	HBO	with 3 Arts Entertainment, Hoorae Media, and For Better or Words, Inc.	
2019–2022	First Wives Club	BET+	with Paramount Television Studios and Tracy Yvonne Productions	
2019	Living With Yourself	Netflix	with Likely Story	
2020	Wilmore	Peacock	with Universal Television	
2020–2021	Haute Dog	HBO Max	with HBO Max	
2021-2022	Hello Jack! The Kindness Show	Apple TV +	with 9 Story USA and Brown Bag Films	
2022	Chivalry	Channel 4	with Baby Cow Productions	
2022	The Pentaverate	Netflix	with Netflix	
2022	Uncoupled	Netflix	with Darren Star Productions, Jeffrey Richman Productions and MTV Entertainment Studios	
2022	Partner Track	Netflix	with Netflix	
2022	Fakes	CBC Gem; Netflix	with Reality Distortion Field and Omnifilm Entertainment	
2022	Wedding Season	Star	with Dancing Ledge Productions	
2023–2024	Everyone Else Burns	Channel 4	with Universal International Studios	
2025	Motorheads	Prime Video	with Rambo Says Happy Birthday Inc., Prod Co., and Amazon MGM Studios	
2025	Countdown	Prime Video	with Derek Haas Productions and Amazon MGM Studios	
2026	Bait	Prime Video	with Left Handed Films and Amazon MGM Studios	

=== Films ===
Year	Title	Director	Gross (worldwide)	Notes	Ref.
2014	Top Five	Chris Rock	$26.1 million	with IAC Films and Scott Rudin Productions	
2015	A Very Murray Christmas	Sofia Coppola	—N/a	with American Zoetrope, Departed Productions and South Beach Productions	
2017	I Love You, Daddy	Louis C.K.	—N/a	with Pig Newton, Inc. Unreleased	
2022	Fire Island	Andrew Ahn	—N/a	with Searchlight Pictures	
2022	Wedding Season	Tom Dey	—N/a	with Samosa Stories and Imagine Entertainment	
2023	The Slumber Party	Veronica Rodriguez	—N/a	with Imagine Kids+Family and Disney Channel	
2024	Night Shift	The China Brothers	—N/a	with Defiant Studios, Bradley Pilz Productions, Kodiak Pictures and Sunset Junction Entertainment	

=== Specials ===
Year	Title	Director	Notes	Ref.
2015	Amy Schumer: Live at the Apollo	Chris Rock	with HBO	
2015	I'm Brent Morin	Lance Bangs	with Netflix	
2015	Big Jay Oakerson: Live at Webster Hall	Jeff Tomsic	with Comedy Central	
2017	Mike Birbiglia: Thank God for Jokes	Seth Barrish; Mike Birbiglia	with Netflix	
2018	Chris Rock: Tamborine	Bo Burnham	with Netflix	
2018	John Mulaney: Kid Gorgeous at Radio City	Alex Timbers	with Netflix	
2018	Bert Kreischer: Secret Time	Todd Biermann	with Netflix	
2019	Ray Romano: Right Here, Around the Corner	Michael Showalter	with Netflix	
2019	Colin Quinn: Red State, Blue State	Bobby Moresco	with CNN	
2022	Patton Oswalt: I Love Everything	Marcus Raboy	with Netflix	
2023	Sarah Silverman: Someone You Love	Jonathan Krisel	with HBO	
2023	Chris Fleming: Hell	Cat Solen	with Peacock	
