= Have You Heard of Christmas? =

2022 TV Christmas special

- Written by: Matt Rogers
- Directed by: Doron Max Hagay
- Starring: Matt Rogers
- Country of origin: United States
- Original language: English

Production
- Cinematography: Charlotte Hornsby
- Editor: Ryan McIlraith
- Running time: 55 minutes
- Production company: Rotten Science

Original release
- Network: Showtime
- Release: December 2, 2022

Have You Heard of Christmas? is a holiday musical comedy TV special written by and starring Matt Rogers. The special was released on Showtime on December 2, 2022, and features original songs, stand-up, and comedy sketches from Rogers and guest stars.

The TV special was filmed at Joe's Pub in New York City in front of a live audience with Rogers being accompanied by Henry Koperski on the piano. Rogers also performed the special in a North American tour in the winter of 2022.

Capitol Records released Rogers' Have You Heard of Christmas? album on November 3, 2023. Derived from the TV special, the album features 12 tracks with new mixes.

== Synopsis ==
Have You Heard of Christmas? follows Matt Rogers and his journey to becoming part of the Christmas canon and establishing himself as the "Pop Prince of Christmas." The musical numbers are intercut with comedic sketches of Rogers and his team coordinating his special and attempting to book the "Queen of Christmas" herself, Mariah Carey. The nine original musical numbers cover topics such as love, infidelity, God, and the true meaning of Christmas.

== Cast ==
- Matt Rogers
- Bowen Yang
- Jo Firestone
- Henry Koperski
- Josh Sharp
- Aaron Jackson
- Pat Regan
- Natalie Walker
- Desi Domo
- Sarah Grace Welbourn
- Maria Soccor

== Musical numbers ==
1. "Also It's Christmas"
2. "Lube for the Sleigh"
3. "Have You Heard of Christmas?"
4. "Hottest Female up in Whoville" (with a spoken word introduction of Where Are You Christmas?)
5. "Every Christmas Eve"
6. "RockaFellaCenta"
7. "I'ma Have Your Back (This Christmas)" (featuring Josh Sharp and Aaron Jackson)
8. "God's Up To His Tricks!"
9. "Rain On Christmas"

== Reception ==
Vulture Magazine critic Kathryn VanArendonk called the special " incredible... buoyant and shiny and memorable, and by making it a musical special, Rogers captures that ineffable thing about the holiday that's so captivating and inane and hard to hit." Variety Magazine writer Marc Malkin praised Roger's performance, calling the special "proudly queer with Sandra Bernhard's comedy, Liza Minelli's camp and Hugh Jackman's showmanship running through Rogers' rainbow-colored tinsel." In Describer Magazine, Sean L. McCarthy states: "Rogers both seeks to deconstruct and mock the Christmas industrial shopping complex, while also placing himself firmly within its firmament."
