= Making It (TV series) =

American reality competition

- Genre: Reality competition
- Created by: Amy Poehler; Nicolle Yaron
- Presented by: Amy Poehler; Nick Offerman
- Judges: Dayna Isom Johnson; Simon Doonan
- Country of origin: United States
- Original language: English
- No. of seasons: 3
- No. of episodes: 22

Production
- Executive producers: Amy Poehler; Nick Offerman; Brooke Posch; Nicolle Yaron; Dave Becky; Pip Wells; Anthony Dominici
- Production companies: Universal Television Alternative Studio; Paper Kite Productions; 3 Arts Entertainment; Open 4 Business Productions

Original release
- Network: NBC
- Release: July 31, 2018 – August 26, 2021

Related
- Baking It

Making It is an American reality competition television series, co-hosted by Amy Poehler and Nick Offerman. The series aired from July 31, 2018, to August 26, 2021, on NBC.

The show features craftspeople skilled in different media competing to be named the "Master Maker" and win $100,000. Each week, competitors make two handmade projects—a "Faster Craft" and a "Master Craft." The winner of each challenge earns a patch. For the Faster Craft, makers have three hours to create an item. For the Master Craft, they have a longer time to create a more elaborate themed collection. At the end of every episode, one person is sent home based on their performance in the Master Craft.

== Cast ==
=== Hosts ===
- Amy Poehler
- Nick Offerman

=== Judges ===
- Dayna Isom Johnson
- Simon Doonan

=== Shop Master ===
- Jimmy DiResta

=== Contestants ===
==== Season 1 ====
Name	Age	Occupation	Residence
Amber Kemp-Gerstel	37	Craft Blogger	Miami, Florida
Billy Kheel	43	Felt Artist	Los Angeles, California
Jeffery "Jeff" Rudell	54	Paper Crafter	New York, NY
Jemma Olson	60	Hodge Podge Crafter	Rockwall, Texas
Joanna "Jo" Gick	37	Interior Designer	Chandler, Arizona
Khiem Nguyen	28	Woodworker	Austin, Texas
Nicole Sweeney	31	Woodworker	San Francisco, California
Robert Mahar	46	Designer and Maker	Los Angeles, California

==== Season 2 ====
Name	Occupation	Residence	Ref.
Ashley Basnight	Woodworker	Norman, Oklahoma	
Aspen Vo Hasse	Calligrapher	San Francisco, California	
Eagan Tilghman	Costume Designer and Puppet Maker	Meridian, Mississippi	
Floyd Davis	Installation Artist	Los Angeles, California	
Jamie Hudson	Maker	Portland, Oregon	
Jessie Bearden	Multi-disciplinary Artist and Portraitist	New York, New York	
Justine Silva	Interior and Spatial Designer, and Window Installation Artist	Los Angeles, California	
Lilly Jimenez	DIY Blogger and Balloon Artist	Miami, Florida	
Matt Kawika Ortiz	Muralist	Honolulu, Hawaii	
Rebecca Propes	Interior Designer	Gilbert, Arizona	

==== Season 3 ====
Name	Occupation	Residence
Adam Kingman	Industrial Designer	Glenbrook, Nevada
Becca Barnett	Taxidermist	Charleston, South Carolina
Blake McFarland	Sculptor	Clovis, California
Chelsea Andersson	Miniaturist	Mill Valley, California
Gary Herd	Woodworker and Muralist	Waldport, Oregon
Jess Lamworth	Sculptor	Phoenix, Maryland
Kara Walker	Custom Fabricator	Orcutt, California
Kaviya Ravi	Display Artist	Louisville, Kentucky
Maria Antoinette	Content Creator	Knoxville, Tennessee
Melañio Gomez	Prop Stylist	San Francisco, California

== Production ==
Promotional poster

On March 28, 2017, it was announced that NBC had straight-to-series ordered the unscripted "Crafts Competition Reality Series" with the working title, The Handmade Project from Amy Poehler's Paper Kite Productions. It was also announced that it would be hosted by Poehler and Nick Offerman.

In October 2017, NBC announced that the show would be called Making It and named the show's two judges, Dayna Isom Johnson and Simon Doonan. NBC later announced that the show would premiere on July 31, 2018.

On August 21, 2018, NBC renewed the series for a second season, which premiered on December 2, 2019, for the holidays and aired over two weeks.

On January 11, 2020, NBC renewed the series for a third season which premiered on June 24, 2021.

On May 16, 2022, NBC shelved the series indefinitely.

== Contestant progress ==
SEASON 1
Contestant	Specialty	1	2	3	4	5	6
Khiem	Woodworking	SAFE	SAFE	WIN	FAST	FAST	WINNER
Jo	Interior Designer	WIN	SAFE	SAFE	SAFE	WIN	RUNNER UP
Amber	DIY Blogger	SAFE	FAST	SAFE	WIN	SAFE	RUNNER UP
Billy	Felt Crafts	SAFE	WIN	SAFE	SAFE	OUT	
Robert	Designer	FAST	SAFE	FAST	OUT		
Nicole	Woodworker	SAFE	SAFE	OUT			
Jeff	Paper Crafts	SAFE	OUT				
Jemma	Hodge Podge	OUT					

SEASON 2
Contestant	Specialty	1	2	3	4	5	6	7	8
Justine	Construction Manager	WIN	SAFE	FAST	SAFE	SAFE	SAFE	WIN	WINNER
Jessie	Portraits	SAFE	SAFE	BOTH	SAFE	SAFE	WIN	SAFE	RUNNER UP
Lilly	DIY Blogger	SAFE	WIN	SAFE	SAFE	FAST	SAFE	SAFE	RUNNER UP
Rebecca	Interior Design	SAFE	SAFE	SAFE	FAST	WIN	SAFE	OUT	
Floyd	Installation	SAFE	SAFE	SAFE	WIN	SAFE	OUT		
Eagan	Costume Design	FAST	SAFE	SAFE	SAFE	OUT			
Matt	Murals	SAFE	SAFE	SAFE	OUT				
Ashley	Woodworking	SAFE	FAST	OUT					
Jamie	Electronics	SAFE	OUT						
Aspen	Calligraphy	OUT							

SEASON 3
Contestant	Specialty	1	2	3	4	5	6	7	8
Adam	Industrial Designer	WIN	SAFE	SAFE	SAFE	FAST	WIN	SAFE	WINNER
Chelsea	Miniaturist	SAFE	FAST	SAFE	WIN	SAFE	SAFE	SAFE	RUNNER UP
Kara	Custom Fabricator		WIN	SAFE	SAFE	SAFE	SAFE	WIN	RUNNER UP
Melañio	Prop Stylist		SAFE	WIN	SAFE	SAFE	FAST	SAFE	RUNNER UP
Becca	Taxidermist	FAST	SAFE	SAFE	SAFE	WIN	SAFE	OUT	
Jess	Sculptor	SAFE	SAFE	SAFE	FAST	SAFE	OUT		
Blake	Sculptor	SAFE	SAFE	SAFE	SAFE	OUT			
Gary	Woodworker	SAFE	SAFE	SAFE	OUT				
Kaviya	Display Artist	SAFE	SAFE	OUT					
Maria	Content Creator	SAFE	OUT						

(FAST) The Contestant won that episode's Faster Craft Challenge.
(WIN) The Contestant won that episode's Master Craft Challenge.
(BOTH) The contestant won both that episode's Faster Craft Challenge and Master Craft Challenge.
(OUT) The Contestant won that episode’s Faster Craft Challenge but was eliminated from the competition during the Master Craft Challenge.
(OUT) The Contestant was eliminated from the competition.
(SAFE) The Contestant won neither the Faster Craft Challenge nor Master Craft Challenge, and they were not eliminated.
(WINNER) The Contestant was named Master Maker.
(RUNNER UP) The contestant was runner up.
(WINNER) The Contestant won the Faster Craft Challenge and was then named Master Maker.
(RUNNER UP) The contestant won the Faster Craft Challenge and was then named a runner up.

== Episodes ==
Season	Makers	Winner	Runner-up(s)	Episodes	Originally released	
Season	Makers	Winner	Runner-up(s)	Episodes	First released	Last released
1	8	Khiem Nguyen	Joanna "Jo" Gick & Amber Kemp-Gerstel	6	July 31, 2018	September 4, 2018
2	10	Justine Silva	Jessie Bearden & Lilly Jimenez	8	December 2, 2019	December 11, 2019
3	10	Adam Kingman	Chelsea Andersson, Melañio Gomez, & Kara Walker	8	June 24, 2021	August 26, 2021

=== Season 1 (2018) ===
No. overall	No. in season	Title	Original release date	U.S. viewers (millions)
1	1	"Meet Your Makers"	July 31, 2018	5.19
For the faster craft challenge, the eight makers must make a craft that reveals each maker's "secret beast". For the master craft challenge, they must make family heirlooms with a contemporary twist.
2	2	"Home Sweet Home"	August 7, 2018	4.15
For the faster craft challenge, the makers must create terrariums that celebrate where they grew up. For the master craft challenge, they must make a collection of handmade forts and children's toys.
3	3	"Party Time!"	August 14, 2018	3.81
For the faster craft challenge, the makers must create unique snack stadiums. For the master craft challenge, they must make a backyard bonanza using repurposed and recycled materials to create themed party seating and matching outdoor games.
4	4	"All of the Holidays at Once"	August 21, 2018	3.73
For the faster craft challenge, the makers must make Halloween costumes using common household items. For the master craft challenge, they must create front door holiday displays.
5	5	"Inside Out"	August 28, 2018	3.66
For the faster craft challenge, the makers create light fixtures made from natural materials. For the master craft challenge, they must transform ordinary backyard sheds into unique personal spaces.
6	6	"Happily Ever Crafter"	September 4, 2018	3.51
The final three makers must transform a real couple's wedding into an amazing handcrafted experience. For the faster craft challenge, the makers make one-of-kind cake toppers. For the master craft challenge, they must create wedding ceremony backdrops and handmade wedding gifts. Amy, Nick, and the judges award the title of Master Maker to the competition winner.

=== Season 2 (2019) ===
No. overall	No. in season	Title	Original release date	U.S. viewers (millions)
7	1	"What Are You Made Of?"	December 2, 2019	2.78
For the faster craft challenge, ten new makers must create a 3D presentation of a food that reflects who they are. For the master craft, they must create a new version of their favorite childhood craft, showing how they've grown.
8	2	"Ordinary Home To Extraordinary Home"	December 3, 2019	2.55
For the faster craft challenge, the makers had to design a wall, based around the idea that everyone has a blank wall in their home. For the master craft, they had to design a mailbox, trying to represent the feel of their homes.
9	3	"Best Friends"	December 4, 2019	2.61
The theme of this week was friendship. For the faster craft challenge, the 8 makers were put into teams of two and were assigned the project of making a two-person costume. They were required to use a number of items from a box of supplies. For the master craft, they had to make homes for an animal.
10	4	"Wreathy Street"	December 5, 2019	1.69
For the faster craft challenge, the makers had to put together wreaths to hang on their front doors. The wreaths were meant to symbolize a season, holiday, occasion, or style. For the master craft, the makers created an oversized interactive lawn display celebrating their favorite holiday.
11	5	"Work and Play"	December 9, 2019	2.38
12	6	"Hope and Dreams"	December 10, 2019	2.91
13	7	"A Shed Hack Staycation"	December 11, 2019	2.77
14	8	"You Made It!"	December 11, 2019	2.13

=== Season 3 (2021) ===
No. overall	No. in season	Title	Original release date	U.S. viewers (millions)
15	1	"One in a Million"	June 24, 2021	2.12
16	2	"Random Crafts of Kindness"	July 1, 2021	1.96
17	3	"Expand Your World"	July 8, 2021	1.88
18	4	"All of the Holidays at Once"	July 15, 2021	2.10
19	5	"Make Yourself at Home"	July 22, 2021	2.00
20	6	"Re-Making Memories"	August 12, 2021	1.26
21	7	"Take It Out Back"	August 19, 2021	1.50
22	8	"Shed Hack"	August 26, 2021	1.50

== Ratings ==
=== U.S. Nielsen ratings ===
==== Season 1 ====
#	Title	Air date	Timeslot (EDT)	Rating (18–49)	Share (18–49)	Viewers (millions)	Nightly Rank	Weekly Rank
1	"Meet Your Makers"	July 31, 2018	Tuesday; 10:00 p.m.	1.1	5	5.19	2	13
2	"Home Sweet Home"	August 7, 2018	Tuesday; 10:00 p.m.	0.9	5	4.15	3	18
3	"Party Time!"	August 14, 2018	Tuesday; 10:00 p.m.	0.9	5	3.81	3	22
4	"All of the Holidays at Once"	August 21, 2018	Tuesday; 10:00 p.m.	0.9	5	3.73	3	—N/a
5	"Inside Out"	August 28, 2018	Tuesday; 10:00 p.m.	0.8	4	3.66	3	19
6	"Happily Ever Crafter"	September 4, 2018	Tuesday; 10:00 p.m.	0.7	4	3.51	3	—N/a

==== Season 2 ====
#	Title	Air date	Timeslot (ET)	Rating (18–49)	Share (18–49)	Viewers (millions)
1	"What Are You Made Of?"	December 2, 2019	Monday; 10:00 p.m.	0.5	3	2.78
2	"Ordinary Home To Extraordinary Home"	December 3, 2019	Tuesday; 10:00 p.m.	0.5	3	2.55
3	"Best Friends"	December 4, 2019	Wednesday; 10:00 p.m.	0.5	3	2.61
4	"Wreathy Street"	December 5, 2019	Thursday; 10:00 p.m.	0.4	2	1.69
5	"Work and Play"	December 9, 2019	Monday; 10:00 p.m.	0.4	3	2.38
6	"Hope and Dreams"	December 10, 2019	Tuesday; 10:00 p.m.	0.5	3	2.91
7	"A Shed Hack Staycation"	December 11, 2019	Wednesday; 9:00 p.m.	0.6	3	2.77
8	"You Made It!"	December 11, 2019	Wednesday; 10:00 p.m.	0.5	3	2.13

==== Season 3 ====
#	Title	Air date	Timeslot (EDT)	Rating (18–49)	Share (18–49)	Viewers (millions)	Timeslot Rank	Nightly Rank
1	"One in a Million"	June 24, 2021	Thursday; 8:00 p.m.	0.4	3	2.12	3	5 (tied)
2	"Random Crafts of Kindness"	July 1, 2021	Thursday; 8:00 p.m.	0.3	3	1.96	4	6
3	"Expand Your World"	July 8, 2021	Thursday; 8:00 p.m.	0.3	3	1.88	4	8
4	"All of the Holidays at Once"	July 15, 2021	Thursday; 8:00 p.m.	0.3	3	2.10	3	7
5	"Make Yourself at Home"	July 22, 2021	Thursday; 8:00 p.m.	0.3	3	2.00	4	7 (tied)
6	"Re-Making Memories"	August 12, 2021	Thursday; 9:00 p.m.	0.2	2	1.26	3 (tied)	10 (tied)
7	"Take It Out Back"	August 19, 2021	Thursday; 9:00 p.m.	0.2	2	1.50	3	10
8	"Shed Hack"	August 26, 2021	Thursday; 9:00 p.m.	0.3	3	1.50	1	5 (tied)

== Baking It ==
In May 2021, Peacock announced that a spin-off show Baking It with a six-episode run has been ordered. It features teams of two talented home bakers. Poehler, Nicole Yaron, Pip Wells, Kate Arend and Dave Becky serve as executive producers. Maya Rudolph and Andy Samberg served as hosts for the first season. The series premiered on December 2, 2021. In October 2022, the series was renewed for a second season, which premiered on December 12, 2022. Amy Poehler replaced Samberg as co-host.

== International version ==
In October 2020, Australia's Network 10 announced at their annual upfronts they would be making a local version of the show for Australian audiences in 2021. The show is co-produced by NBCUniversal International Studios' Matchbox Pictures and Eureka Productions. The series is hosted by comedians Susie Youssef and Harley Breen, and judged by production designer and art director Deborah Riley and paper engineer Benja Harney. The series premiered on Network 10 on September 15, 2021. In October 2021, it was announced that the series had been cancelled, with the final episode airing on November 6, 2021.
