= Paper Kite Productions =

American film and television production company

- Logo used since 2014
- Type: Private
- Industry: Production company
- Founded: August 14, 2002; 24 years ago in New York City, New York, United States
- Founder: Amy Poehler
- Headquarters: Culver City, California, U.S.
- Owner: Amy Poehler

Paper Kite Productions Production logo, as seen on Broad City

Paper Kite Productions is an American film and television production company founded in 2002 by actress, comedian and producer Amy Poehler. It is known for producing the series The Mighty B!, Broad City, Difficult People, Making It, Russian Doll, and Duncanville.

== Filmography ==
=== Television ===
Year	Title	Network	Notes	Ref.
2008–2011	The Mighty B!	Nickelodeon; Nicktoons	with Polka Dot Pictures and Nickelodeon Animation Studio	
2014–2019	Broad City	Comedy Central	with 3 Arts Entertainment, Jax Media, and Comedy Partners	
2015–2017	Difficult People	Hulu	with 3 Arts Entertainment, Jax Media, and Universal Cable Productions	
2018	I Feel Bad	NBC	with 3 Arts Entertainment, CannyLads Productions, Seemu! Inc., and Universal Television	
2018–2021	Making It	NBC	with 3 Arts Entertainment and Universal Television Alternative Studio	
2019–2022	Russian Doll	Netflix	with 3 Arts Entertainment, Avenue A, Shoot to Midnight, Jax Media, and Universal Television	
2020–2022	Duncanville	Fox	with Scullys, Universal Television, Fox Entertainment, 20th Television and 20th Television Animation	
2020–2022	Three Busy Debras	Adult Swim	with Mail Lizard, Alive and Kicking, Inc., and Williams Street	
2020	Nate – A One Man Show	Netflix		
2021–2023	Baking It	NBC; Peacock	with 3 Arts Entertainment and Universal Television Alternative Studio	
2021–2025	Harlem	Amazon Prime Video	with I Am Other, 3 Arts Entertainment, Amazon Studios, and Universal Television	
2023	The Gentle Art of Swedish Death Cleaning	Peacock	with Scout Productions and Universal Television Alternative Studio	

==== Upcoming ====
- Dig (with Fremulon, Ocean Avenue, 3 Arts Entertainment, and Universal Television)

==== In development ====
- Here We Go (with BBC Studios and Universal Television)
- Untitled Hannah Berner and Paige DeSorbo project (with Universal Television)

=== Films ===
Year	Title	Director	Gross (worldwide)	Distributor	Notes	Ref.
2019	Wine Country	Amy Poehler	—N/a	Netflix	with Paper Pictures and Dunshire Productions	
2021	Moxie	Amy Poehler	—N/a	Netflix		
2022	Lucy and Desi	Amy Poehler	—N/a	Amazon Prime Video	with Amazon Studios, Imagine Documentaries, White Horse Pictures and Diamond Docs	
2023	First Time Female Director	Chelsea Peretti	—N/a	Roku	with MarVista Entertainment and Fox Entertainment	
2026	Steps	Alyce Tzue; John Ripa	—N/a	Netflix	with Netflix Animation Studios	

== Podcasts ==
Year	Title	Host(s)	Provider	Genre	Notes	Ref.
2023–present	Say More with Dr? Sheila	Amy Poehler	Audacy	Comedy	with Cadence13	
2025–present	Good Hang with Amy Poehler	Amy Poehler	The Ringer	Comedy	with The Ringer	
