= Gabe Liedman =

American comedian and comedy writer (born 20th century)

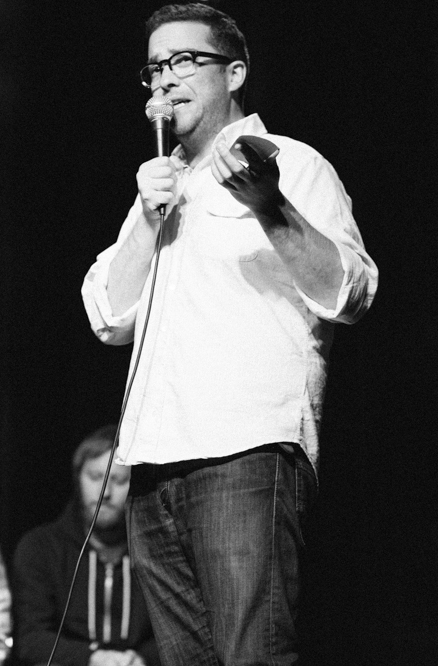
- Liedman at South by Southwest in 2013
- Education: Columbia University (BA)
- Occupations: Television writer; producer; comedian
- Years active: 2001–present
- Known for: Showrunner of Q-Force and PEN15
- Spouse: Daniel Zomparelli (m. 2017)

Gabe Liedman is an American stand-up comedian, television writer, producer, and actor, known for his work on PEN15, Brooklyn Nine-Nine, and Inside Amy Schumer. He is the showrunner of Netflix animation series Q-Force and the first season of PEN15.

== Biography ==
Liedman grew up in Philadelphia and graduated from Columbia University in 2004. He joined the Varsity Show in 2001 and met Jenny Slate, who became his future stand-up and writing partner in the comic duo Gabe and Jenny. His castmates also included television writer and creator of Netflix series Never Have I Ever Lang Fisher, comedian Michelle Collins, Emmy Award–nominated stage actor Brandon Victor Dixon, managing editor of The Onion and Upworthy co-founder Peter Koechley, and Robby Mook, who became manager of Hillary Clinton's 2016 presidential campaign.

After college, Liedman worked for Barneys New York department store as a salesperson during the day. At night, he and Slate worked for comedy clubs around the city, eventually hosting the Williamsburg-based, critically acclaimed comedy show Big Terrific, along with stand-up comedian Max Silvestri. After the show had its last New York City performance in 2015, the trio eventually brought the show to Los Angeles and Washington, D.C.

In 2013, Liedman got his first writing job as a staff writer on the writing team of Inside Amy Schumer. From 2013 to 2015, he was also a writer and actor for Nick Kroll's Kroll Show, and worked for the first three seasons of Brooklyn Nine-Nine from 2013 to 2016. In 2014, he made his feature-film debut in Obvious Child, starring Jenny Slate and Jake Lacy.

He was a producer for the comedy series Broad City and was in the works of creating Malltown USA with the showrunners, Ilana Glazer and Abbi Jacobson. The show followed the life of a 13-year-old navigating the complexities of life in the classic microcosm of American culture, the strip mall.

In 2018, Liedman became the executive producer of PEN15.

In 2019, Netflix ordered 10 episodes of a half-hour, adult animated spy comedy series titled Q-Force, written by Liedman and produced by Michael Schur and Sean Hayes. The show premiered on Netflix in 2021.

=== Personal life ===
Liedman is gay and is married to Canadian writer Daniel Zomparelli. He is Jewish.

== Filmography ==
Film and Television work by Gabe Liedman
Year	Title	Screenwriter	Producer	Actor	Executive producer	Creator	Role	Notes
2013	Inside Amy Schumer	Yes	No	Yes	No	No	Danny P.	Wrote ten episodes, appeared in one episode
2013–2015	Kroll Show	Yes	No	Yes	No	No	various roles	Wrote sixteen episodes, appeared in five episodes
2013–2016	Brooklyn Nine-Nine	Yes	Yes	Yes	No	No	Dr. Oliver Cox	Wrote nine episodes, appeared in four episodes
2014	Obvious Child	No	Yes	Yes	No	No	Joey	Liedman's feature-film debut
2017	Transparent	Yes	Yes	Yes	No	No	Gabe	Wrote one episode
2017–2019	Broad City	Yes	Yes	No	No	No		Wrote two episodes
2019–2020	PEN15	Yes	No	No	Yes	No		Wrote two episodes
2021	Q-Force	Yes	Yes	Yes	Yes	Yes	Benji	Wrote two episodes, appeared in eight episodes
2022–2023	Never Have I Ever	Yes	Yes	Yes	No	No	Cyril	Wrote two episodes, appeared in one episode

== Awards and nominations ==
Liedman was nominated for the Writers Guild of America Awards in 2019, 2020, and 2021 for his work on PEN15. He shared the 2019 Gotham Independent Film Award for Breakthrough Series – Short Form, also for his work on PEN15.
