= Russian Doll (TV series) =

American comedy-drama television series

- Genre: Comedy-drama; Mystery
- Created by: Natasha Lyonne; Leslye Headland; Amy Poehler
- Starring: Natasha Lyonne; Greta Lee; Yul Vazquez; Elizabeth Ashley; Charlie Barnett; Chloë Sevigny
- Composer: Joe Wong
- Country of origin: United States
- Original languages: English; German; Hungarian
- No. of seasons: 2
- No. of episodes: 15

Production
- Executive producers: Natasha Lyonne; Leslye Headland; Amy Poehler; Dave Becky; Tony Hernandez; Lilly Burns; Allison Silverman; Alex Buono; Regina Corrado; Kate Arend (Note: Arend is credited as producer for the first season and credited as an executive producer for the second season.)
- Producers: John Skidmore; Ryan McCormick; Alice Ju; Ben Poppleton; Isabel Richardson
- Cinematography: Chris Teague; Ula Pontikos
- Editors: Todd Downing; Laura Weinberg; Debra F. Simone
- Running time: 24–33 minutes
- Production companies: Universal Television; Paper Kite Productions; Jax Media; 3 Arts Entertainment; Animal Pictures; Shoot to Midnight

Original release
- Network: Netflix
- Release: February 1, 2019 – April 20, 2022

Russian Doll is an American comedy-drama television series, created by Natasha Lyonne, Leslye Headland, and Amy Poehler, that premiered on Netflix on February 1, 2019. The series follows Nadia Vulvokov (Lyonne), a game developer who repeatedly dies and relives the same night in an ongoing time loop and tries to solve it, leading to her finding Alan Zaveri (Charlie Barnett) in the same situation. It also stars Greta Lee, Yul Vazquez, Elizabeth Ashley, and Chloë Sevigny.

Its first season received fourteen Primetime Emmy Award nominations, including Outstanding Comedy Series and Outstanding Lead Actress in a Comedy Series for Lyonne. In June 2019, the series was renewed for a second season, which premiered on April 20, 2022.

== Premise ==
Russian Doll follows a woman named Nadia who is caught in a time loop at her 36th birthday party one night in New York City. She dies repeatedly, always restarting at the same moment at the party, as she tries to figure out what is happening to her. She meets a man who is experiencing the same thing in a different event.

In season 2, Nadia is 10 days away from celebrating her 40th birthday when the 6 train sends her back in time to 1982. She soon discovers she is trapped inside the body of her mother, Nora, who is pregnant with her. Nadia decides to pursue the gold Krugerrands her mother lost that same year, in order to change the course of her family's history.

== Cast and characters ==
=== Main ===
- Natasha Lyonne as Nadia Vulvokov, a software engineer who finds herself reliving her 36th birthday party in an ongoing time loop wherein she repeatedly dies and the process begins again
  - Brooke Timber portrays young Nadia
- Greta Lee as Maxine, Nadia's friend, who throws her 36th birthday party
- Yul Vazquez as John Reyes (season 1), a real estate agent and Nadia's ex-boyfriend who is currently in the process of divorcing his wife
- Elizabeth Ashley as Ruth Brenner, a therapist and close family friend of both Nadia and her mother
  - Kate Jennings Grant (guest season 1) and Annie Murphy (recurring season 2) portray a young Ruth
- Charlie Barnett (Note: Barnett is credited as a guest star for the first three episodes, and is credited with the main cast from episode four onward.) as Alan Zaveri, a man who is also stuck in a time loop like Nadia
- Chloë Sevigny as Lenora (Nora) Vulvokov (season 2; guest season 1), Nadia's mother with whom she had a difficult childhood

=== Recurring ===
- Jeremy Bobb as Mike Kershaw, a college literature professor with whom Beatrice is having an affair
- Brendan Sexton III as Horse, a homeless man whom Nadia helps out
- Rebecca Henderson as Lizzy, an artist, and friend of Nadia and Maxine
- Ritesh Rajan as Ferran, a friend of Alan's who works at a deli
- Ken Beck as a paramedic
- Dascha Polanco as Beatrice (season 1), Alan's girlfriend, whom he wishes to propose to
- Sharlto Copley as Chezare "Chez" Carrera (season 2), Nora's boyfriend in 1982
- Irén Bordán as Vera Peschauer (season 2), Nora's mother and Nadia's grandmother, a Hungarian Jewish survivor of the Holocaust, appears in 1982 and 1968
  - Ilona McCrea portrays young Vera in 1944
- Athina Papadimitriu as Delia (season 2), Vera's longtime best friend and supporter, a Hungarian Romani survivor of World War II, appears in 1982 and 1968
  - Franciscka Farkas portrays young Delia in 1944
- Ephraim Sykes as Derek (season 2), a member of the Guardian Angels watching over the subway in 1982
- Rosie O'Donnell voices the subway announcer (season 2)

=== Guest ===
- Max Knoblauch as a paramedic
- Yoni Lotan as Ryan, a paramedic
- Waris Ahluwalia as Wardog, Maxine's drug dealer
- David Cale as Dr. Daniel (season 1), a man who concocts the drugs that Wardog sells
- Devin Ratray as a deli customer whom Nadia interrupts as he is purchasing a lottery ticket (season 1)
- Tami Sagher as Shifra (season 1), a secretary for the rabbi at the Tifereth Israel Synagogue
- Jonathan Hadary as the rabbi at the Tifereth Israel Synagogue whom Nadia seeks out to ask questions about the building where her party was thrown (season 1)
- Lillias White as Dr. Zaveri, Alan's mother
- Burt Young as Joe (season 1), a tenant in Alan's apartment building
- Mirirai Sithole as Audrey, Alan's neighbor
- Michelle Buteau as a woman who pepper sprays Alan when she thinks he is stalking her (season 1)
- Jocelyn Bioh as Claire (season 1)
- Anoop Desai as Salim (season 2), Ferran's father and owner of the convenience store in 1982
- Danielle Perez as a librarian (season 2)
- Max Baker as a doctor in a psychiatric ward (season 2)
- Sandor Funtek as Lenny (season 2)
- Carolyn Michelle Smith as Agnes, Alan's grandmother (season 2)
- Balázs Czukor as Kristóf Halázs (season 2), a Hungarian artist and grandson of the Arrow Cross officer responsible for the confiscation of Nadia's family's property
- Gergely Csiby as a German officer (season 2)
- Piroska Molnár as a Hungarian woman who yells at Nadia and Maxine (season 2)
- Phillipp Droste as Lukas (season 2)
- Tulian Aczel as Bruno (season 2)

== Episodes ==
=== Series overview ===
| Season | Episodes | Originally released |
|---|---|---|
| 1 | 8 | February 1, 2019 |
| 2 | 7 | April 20, 2022 |

=== Season 1 (2019) ===
| No. overall | No. in season | Title | Directed by | Written by | Original release date |
|---|---|---|---|---|---|
| 1 | 1 | "Nothing in This World Is Easy" | Leslye Headland | Story by : Natasha Lyonne & Leslye Headland & Amy Poehler; Teleplay by : Leslye Headland | February 1, 2019 |
After dying abruptly on the night of her 36th birthday, Nadia finds herself reliving the events of the night in a continuous time loop. Every time Nadia dies, she returns to the bathroom of her friend Maxine's loft, where Nadia's birthday party is being thrown.
| 2 | 2 | "The Great Escape" | Leslye Headland | Natasha Lyonne & Amy Poehler | February 1, 2019 |
An increasingly frantic Nadia is convinced that she is hallucinating due to smoking one of Maxine's Israeli joints at her birthday party. She tracks down Maxine's drug dealer Wardog in order to find out what the joint was laced with.
| 3 | 3 | "A Warm Body" | Leslye Headland | Allison Silverman | February 1, 2019 |
Nadia asks for John's help as her quest for answers leads her to a local synagogue. While searching for her cat Oatmeal, Nadia befriends a homeless man named Horse, and later encounters a mysterious man in a falling elevator.
| 4 | 4 | "Alan's Routine" | Jamie Babbit | Cirocco Dunlap and Leslye Headland | February 1, 2019 |
The day before crossing paths with Nadia in the elevator, Alan plans to propose to his girlfriend Beatrice, only for her to break up with him. To make matters worse, Beatrice admits to cheating on Alan with her professor, Mike. Nadia tracks down Alan, since he is also experiencing time loops, but he accuses her of interfering with his routine.
| 5 | 5 | "Superiority Complex" | Jamie Babbit | Jocelyn Bioh | February 1, 2019 |
Alan shows up at Nadia's birthday party and the two work together to figure out what is happening to them. Despite initially rebuffing Alan's theory that they are being punished for being bad people, Nadia sets out to make amends with John. Meanwhile, Alan confronts Mike about his affair with Beatrice.
| 6 | 6 | "Reflection" | Jamie Babbit | Flora Birnbaum | February 1, 2019 |
In an effort to figure out how their lives are connected, Nadia helps Alan remember his first death as they retrace his steps. Alan eventually recalls he died as a result of suicide by jumping from the top of a building.
| 7 | 7 | "The Way Out" | Leslye Headland | Story by : Allison Silverman; Teleplay by : Allison Silverman and Leslye Headland | February 1, 2019 |
With the steady disappearance of their loved ones, Nadia and Alan theorize that the loops started because they neglected to help each other on the first night they died. Meanwhile, Nadia is haunted by memories of her troubled childhood.
| 8 | 8 | "Ariadne" | Natasha Lyonne | Natasha Lyonne | February 1, 2019 |
Nadia and Alan find themselves trapped in two separate timelines, where they run into alternate, pre-loop versions of each other who are unaware of the future loops. They succeed at preventing each other's first deaths, and the episode ends with the pair becoming friends in both timelines, causing the timelines to merge.

=== Season 2 (2022) ===
| No. overall | No. in season | Title | Directed by | Written by | Original release date |
|---|---|---|---|---|---|
| 9 | 1 | "Nowhen" | Natasha Lyonne | Natasha Lyonne | April 20, 2022 |
A few days before her 40th birthday, Nadia discovers a wormhole on the 6 Train that allows her to travel to and from 1982. While in the past, she realizes she is trapped in the body of her mother Nora, who is pregnant with Nadia. She unknowingly helps a conman named Chez steal her grandmother's inheritance of 150 gold coins. After returning to the present, Nadia asks Ruth about Chez and discovers he was involved with Nora around the time she lost the coins. She also tries to warn Alan about the wormhole. Nadia returns to 1982 and confirms she and Chez stole the coins from Vera. While she is in the bathroom, Chez takes off with them, leaving Nadia behind. Back in 2022, Alan boards the 6 Train.
| 10 | 2 | "Coney Island Baby" | Alex Buono | Allison Silverman and Zakiyyah Alexander | April 20, 2022 |
Still in 1982, Nadia (in Nora's body) is confronted by her grandmother, Vera, who accuses her of stealing the coins. Nadia enlists the Guardian Angels to track down Chez before realizing she can look him up online in the present. After tracking down an older Chez in 2022, Nadia goes back to 1982 to confront him. Chez claims he already gave her the money the previous night. Nadia runs into a younger Ruth, just as Vera has Nora evicted from her apartment. With Ruth's help, Nadia buys back the coins from a jewelry store, using the money of a returned luxury car and Ruth trading her wedding ring as collateral. Nadia leaves a voicemail for Nora, pleading with her to not waste her second chance. On her way to return the coins, Nadia gets distracted when she spots Alan on the subway. When she returns to her seat, the coins are gone.
| 11 | 3 | "Brain Drain" | Natasha Lyonne | Natasha Lyonne and Alice Ju | April 20, 2022 |
After losing the coins on the subway, Nadia goes to the hospital for an ultrasound with Ruth and Vera. Vera tells Nadia about a Gold Train in Budapest that is linked to the coins. Nadia takes several family documents from Vera's apartment, as well as a set of slides from the library, and returns to Nora's mold-infested apartment. Nadia hallucinates earwigs crawling out of her arms, as well as the real Nora, whom only she can see. Nadia receives a call from a librarian, who tells her how the Gold Train contained all the valuables of Hungarian refugees in World War II, including Vera's gold coins. After the war ended, the train was lost and the valuables were stolen by Nazis. Before Nadia and Nora can look for the train, the police arrive and take Nadia to a mental institution. Nadia tries to explain her situation to the doctors, but realizes her mother's schizophrenia is starting to take over her own mind. Nadia escapes the institution and returns to the present, where she finds her family's receipt for the Gold Train.
| 12 | 4 | "Station to Station" | Alex Buono | Alice Ju & Lizzie Rose & Natasha Lyonne | April 20, 2022 |
After boarding the 6 Train, Alan is taken to East Berlin in 1962, where he attends graduate school in his Ghanaian grandmother's body and dates a man named Lenny. In the present, Nadia and Alan debate the ethics of time travel, with Alan firmly against Nadia's desire to change the past. Nadia brings Maxine to Budapest to help her find her grandmother's home. In 1962, Alan learns Lenny and the other students are planning to tunnel under the Berlin Wall and his grandmother has drawn the plans for them.
| 13 | 5 | "Exquisite Corpse" | Alex Buono | Allison Silverman | April 20, 2022 |
In 1944, Nadia, as her younger grandmother Vera, decides to find the Gold Train and recover her family artifacts. She discovers the items are kept in a German warehouse, and manages to steal them in a bag and hide them in the sewer. She then goes to a church and finds the German priest (Kiss Laszlo) and asks him to mail the map after the war ends—so an older Vera can retrieve the items. She boards the train, emerges as an older Vera, and recovers the items from the sewer. She and Delia go to sell/pawn them only to find that she will be paid with gold coins—the very same ones that Nora will steal in the future. Realizing that nothing that she has done changed her fate, Nadia is upset and walks through the subway cars, passing through generations with each car. At the end, her water breaks.
| 14 | 6 | "Schrödinger's Ruth" | Alex Buono | Cirocco Dunlap | April 20, 2022 |
Nadia—as her mother Nora—takes baby Nadia on the 6 Train and returns to present time. She learns Ruth is in the hospital and rushes over only to find several Ruths, and is confused. She walks to the morgue, seeing her own corpses from previous deaths in season 1, and realizes that a time distortion has occurred. Alan, now searching for Nadia, also discovers that time is distorted. The two meet back in the bathroom from her 36th birthday loop, with Nadia holding baby Nadia.
| 15 | 7 | "Matryoshka" | Natasha Lyonne | Natasha Lyonne and Alice Ju | April 20, 2022 |
Nadia and Alan argue over the broken timeline, and they return to the subway. Horse, in an MTA uniform, directs them into the tunnels and towards her train. They board the train and find it full of her friends on their way to Ruth's wake, saying it is April 30. Alan forces Nadia off the train, saying that they need to take the baby back and fix time. While walking through the tunnel, they are hit by an approaching train and they "wake up" separated. In the void, Alan sees his grandmother as an MTA worker, and the two briefly talk before she urges him to move on. Nadia, carrying baby Nadia, must abandon the bag of gold coins and continues through a door into her void where she meets her mother, Nora. She decides to hand the baby (herself) back over to her mother, and sets the timeline right again, leaving the train with a smile. Nadia then heads over to Maxine's apartment and joins Alan at Ruth's wake.

== Production ==
The series was created by Natasha Lyonne, Amy Poehler, and Leslye Headland, all of whom also serve as executive producers. The series was produced by Universal Television, Paper Kite Productions, Jax Media, Animal Pictures, and 3 Arts Entertainment. Headland served as showrunner for the first season, while Lyonne took over as showrunner for the second season.

In September 2017, the initial series order was announced, along with Lyonne starring. In January 2019, the rest of the cast was confirmed, including Greta Lee, Yul Vazquez, Elizabeth Ashley, and Charlie Barnett, as well as Chloë Sevigny, Dascha Polanco, Brendan Sexton III, Rebecca Henderson, Jeremy Bobb, Ritesh Rajan, and Jocelyn Bioh as guest stars. In March 2021, Annie Murphy was cast for the second season in an undisclosed role and Carolyn Michelle Smith joined the cast in a recurring role. The following month, Sharlto Copley and Ephraim Sykes joined the cast for the second season.

Principal photography for season one began on February 22, 2018, in New York City.

On June 11, 2019, Netflix renewed the series for a second season. In March 2020, filming for season two was delayed due to the COVID-19 pandemic. Production began one year later in March 2021. The second season made significant utilization of on-set virtual production for a majority of the train sequences. The season finale sequence was filmed at the underground cisterns in Budapest.

In 2019 and 2022 interviews, the series creators said that they had ideas for a third season.

== Music ==
The song "Gotta Get Up" by American singer-songwriter Harry Nilsson was used as the "reset" song each time the character Nadia dies and is resurrected in the first season of the series. Lyonne explained to The New York Times that in choosing the song she was struck by the "buoyant doomsday quality" of Nilsson's life. Other contenders for the reset song included "Not Tonight" by Lil' Kim, "Crazy Feeling" by Lou Reed and "No Fun" by the Stooges. Though Netflix finally obtained the usage rights to Nilsson's song, the cost of using it so many times took up a significant portion of the music budget. His estate also limited how many times the song could be used. According to music supervisor Brienne Rose, the production was able to "find a balance between the maximum number of uses and what the budget would allow." The "reset" song utilized for the character Alan was Beethoven's "Piano Concerto No. 4 in G Major".

== Release ==
On January 9, 2019, Netflix released the first trailer for the series. On January 23, 2019, the series held its official premiere at the Metrograph theater in New York City. Those in attendance included series writer Jocelyn Bioh, Taylor Schilling, Natasha Lyonne, Fred Armisen, Amy Poehler, Chloë Sevigny, Greta Lee, Dascha Polanco, Rosie O'Donnell, Danielle Brooks, Laura Prepon, and David Harbour. The series premiered on Netflix on February 1, 2019. The second season was released on April 20, 2022.

== Reception ==
=== Critical response ===
Critical response of Russian Doll
| Season | Rotten Tomatoes | Metacritic |
|---|---|---|
| 1 | 97% (98 reviews) | 88 (26 reviews) |
| 2 | 97% (59 reviews) | 79 (25 reviews) |

==== Season 1 ====
The first season received critical acclaim. On the review aggregation website Rotten Tomatoes, it holds a 97% approval rating with an average rating of 8.5/10, based on 98 reviews. The website's critics consensus reads, "Russian Doll may be stuck in a time loop, but this endlessly inventive series never repeats itself as it teeters on a seesaw of shifting tones – from fatally funny to mournfully sad – that is balanced with exhilarating moxie by an astonishing Natasha Lyonne." Metacritic, which uses a weighted average, assigned the first season score of 88 out of 100 based on 26 critics, indicating "universal acclaim".

Alicia Lutes of IGN gave the first season a 10/10. Praising the series, she adds that it is "an inventive, unpredictable ride that will easily stand as one of the best shows of the year." In a positive review, Rolling Stone's Alan Sepinwall awarded the series 4 1/2 stars out of 5 and praised it saying, "That blend of tones, and the controlled mania of Lyonne's brilliant performance, makes Russian Doll feel like something wholly new, even as it cops to its many influences." The New York Times' James Poniewozik was similarly approving saying, "Russian Doll is lean and snappily paced; it even managed the rare feat, in the era of streaming-TV bloat, of making me wish for a bit more." Collider's Haleigh Foutch was equally enthusiastic giving the series a rating of 5 out of 5 stars and applauding it saying, "It's pure binge-watching magic; a show that's not only expertly designed to compel viewers to the next episode but invests just as much in the integrity of story and character." Time's Judy Berman described the series as "cerebral yet propulsive" and praised its many layers calling it, "2019's best new show to date".

==== Season 2 ====
The second season also received critical praise. On Rotten Tomatoes, it has a 97% approval rating, with an average rating of 8/10, based on 61 reviews. The website's critics' consensus states, "Not all of Russian Doll's gambles pay off in this ambitious and thrillingly audacious second season, but the show's willingness to take risks is often its own reward." On Metacritic, it has a weighted average score of 79 out of 100, based on 25 critics, indicating "generally favorable reviews.

In a perfect five-star review by The Guardian's Rebecca Nicholson, she described it as "a truly gorgeous series, from its aesthetic to its script, and it feels incredibly rich." A Los Angeles Times review by Robert Lloyd applauded the season, writing, "It's helpful to regard the series, especially in the whipsaw transitions of its beautiful last movements, as musical or poetic." Another positive review by Collider's Ross Bonaime commended the writers of Season 2, explaining that, "Russian Doll's second season is a truly wild ride, even when compared to the circuital first season, but it's the looseness and free-flowing exploration of the past that makes this season so remarkable." In an enthusiastic review, Matt Fowler of IGN praised the series, exclaiming that "Russian Doll's second season finds a way to keep the feistiness of time trickery alive with a Quantum Leap-style story that, of course, leads to wonderfully tender and meaningful catharsis." Rolling Stone's Alan Sepinwall gave the season 4 out of 5 stars, calling it a "blast" and noting that "in reaching further and trying more, Russian Doll Season Two ultimately justifies the series' existence as more than just a one-shot." The second season earned a Reframe Stamp since the series "was found to hire women or individuals of other underrepresented gender identities (including those who are non-binary or gender non-conforming) in at least four out of eight key roles including writer, director, producer, lead, co-leads and department heads."

=== Accolades ===
| Year | Award | Category | Nominee(s) | Result | Ref. |
|---|---|---|---|---|---|
| 2019 | Television Critics Association Awards | Program of the Year | Russian Doll | Nominated | |
| 2019 | Television Critics Association Awards | Outstanding Achievement in Comedy | Russian Doll | Nominated | |
| 2019 | Television Critics Association Awards | Outstanding New Program | Russian Doll | Won | |
| 2019 | Television Critics Association Awards | Individual Achievement in Comedy | Natasha Lyonne | Nominated | |
| 2019 | Primetime Emmy Awards | Outstanding Comedy Series | Russian Doll | Nominated | |
| 2019 | Primetime Emmy Awards | Outstanding Lead Actress in a Comedy Series | Natasha Lyonne | Nominated | |
| 2019 | Primetime Emmy Awards | Outstanding Writing for a Comedy Series | Natasha Lyonne, Leslye Headland & Amy Poehler (for "Nothing in This World Is Easy") | Nominated | |
| 2019 | Primetime Emmy Awards | Outstanding Writing for a Comedy Series | Allison Silverman (for "A Warm Body") | Nominated | |
| 2019 | Primetime Creative Arts Emmy Awards | Outstanding Casting for a Comedy Series | Christine Kromer | Nominated | |
| 2019 | Primetime Creative Arts Emmy Awards | Outstanding Cinematography for a Single-Camera Series (Half-Hour) | Chris Teague (for "Ariadne") | Won | |
| 2019 | Primetime Creative Arts Emmy Awards | Outstanding Contemporary Costumes | Jennifer Rogien, Melissa Stanton & Charlotte Svenson (for "Superiority Complex") | Won | |
| 2019 | Primetime Creative Arts Emmy Awards | Outstanding Music Supervision | Brienne Rose (for "Nothing In This World Is Easy") | Nominated | |
| 2019 | Primetime Creative Arts Emmy Awards | Outstanding Single-Camera Picture Editing for a Comedy Series | Laura Weinberg (for "Ariadne") | Nominated | |
| 2019 | Primetime Creative Arts Emmy Awards | Outstanding Production Design for a Narrative Program (Half-Hour or Less) | Michael Bricker, John Cox & Jessica Petruccelli (for "Nothing In This World Is Easy") | Won | |
| 2019 | Primetime Creative Arts Emmy Awards | Outstanding Sound Editing for a Comedy or Drama Series (Half-Hour) and Animation | Thomas Ryan, Alex Soto & Wen-Hsuan Tseng (for "The Way Out") | Nominated | |
| 2019 | Primetime Creative Arts Emmy Awards | Outstanding Sound Mixing for a Comedy or Drama Series (Half-Hour) and Animation | Lewis Goldstein & Phil Rosati (for "The Way Out") | Nominated | |
| 2019 | Primetime Creative Arts Emmy Awards | Outstanding Stunt Coordination for a Comedy Series or Variety Program | Christopher Place | Nominated | |
| 2019 | Saturn Awards | Best Streaming Fantasy, Sci-Fi, or Action/Thriller Television Series | Russian Doll | Nominated | |
| 2019 | Saturn Awards | Best Actress in a Streaming Presentation | Natasha Lyonne | Nominated | |
| 2019 | Gotham Awards | Breakthrough Series – Short Form | Russian Doll | Nominated | |
| 2019 | Satellite Awards | Best Musical or Comedy Series | Russian Doll | Nominated | |
| 2019 | Satellite Awards | Best Actress in a Musical or Comedy Series | Natasha Lyonne | Nominated | |
| 2020 | Cinema Audio Society Awards | Outstanding Achievement in Sound Mixing for Television Series – Half Hour | Phil Rosati, Lewis Goldstein, Thomas Ryan, Jerrell Suelto & Wen Hsuan Tseng | Nominated | |
| 2020 | Golden Globe Awards | Best Actress – Television Series Musical or Comedy | Natasha Lyonne | Nominated | |
| 2020 | Make-Up Artists and Hair Stylists Guilds | Best Television Series, Mini-Series or New Media Series – Best Contemporary Make-Up | Amy L. Forsythe, Heidi Pakdel & Danielle Minnella | Nominated | |
| 2020 | 22nd Costume Designers Guild Awards | Excellence in Contemporary Television | Jennifer Rogien (for "Superiority Complex") | Nominated | |
| 2020 | Casting Society of America | Television Pilot & First Season – Comedy | Christine Kromer & Andrew Femenella | Won | |
| 2020 | Art Directors Guild Awards | Half-Hour Single-Camera Series | Michael Bricker (for "Nothing in This World Is Easy") | Won | |
| 2020 | Writers Guild of America Awards | Comedy Series | Jocelyn Bioh, Flora Birnbaum, Cirocco Dunlap, Leslye Headland, Natasha Lyonne, Amy Poehler, Tami Sagher & Allison Silverman | Nominated | |
| 2020 | Writers Guild of America Awards | New Series | Jocelyn Bioh, Flora Birnbaum, Cirocco Dunlap, Leslye Headland, Natasha Lyonne, Amy Poehler, Tami Sagher & Allison Silverman | Nominated | |
| 2020 | Nebula Award | The Ray Bradbury Nebula Award for Outstanding Dramatic Presentation | Allison Silverman and Leslye Headland (for "The Way Out") | Nominated | |
| 2020 | American Cinema Editors Award | Best Edited Comedy Series for Non-Commercial Television | Todd Downing (for "The Way Out") | Nominated | |
| 2020 | Dorian TV Awards | TV Performance of the Year - Actress | Natasha Lyonne | Nominated | |
| 2020 | Dorian TV Awards | TV Comedy of the Year | Russian Doll | Nominated | |
| 2020 | Hugo Award | Best Dramatic Presentation, Long Form | Natasha Lyonne, Leslye Headland, Amy Poehler, Jamie Babbit (for Season One) | Nominated | |
| 2022 | Set Decorators Society of America Awards | Best Achievement in Décor/Design of a Half-Hour Single-Camera Series | Lindsay Stephen and Diane Lederman | Nominated | |
| 2022 | Primetime Creative Arts Emmy Awards | Outstanding Cinematography for a Single-Camera Series (Half-Hour) | Ula Pontikos (for "Nowhen") | Nominated | |
| 2022 | Saturn Awards | Best Streaming Fantasy Television Series | Russian Doll | Nominated | |
| 2022 | Dorian TV Awards | Best Unsung TV Show | Russian Doll | Nominated | |
| 2022 | Dorian TV Awards | Best TV Performance | Natasha Lyonne | Nominated | |
| 2023 | American Society of Cinematographers Awards | Outstanding Achievement in Cinematography in an Episode of a Half-Hour Television Series | Ula Pontikos (for "Matryoshka") | Nominated | |
| 2023 | Golden Reel Awards | Outstanding Achievement in Music Editing – Broadcast Short Form | Georgie Ramsland (for "Matryoshka") | Nominated | |

== See also ==
- List of films featuring time loops
