= Matt Rogers (comedian) =

American comedian (born 1990)

- Rogers in 2026
- Born: March 5, 1990 (age 36)
- Education: New York University (BFA)
- Occupations: Comedian; writer; podcaster; actor; recording artist
- Years active: 2013–present

Matt Rogers (born March 5, 1990) is an American comedian, actor, writer, podcaster, television host, and recording artist. He is best known for co-hosting the pop culture podcast Las Culturistas with Bowen Yang since 2016.

== Early life and education ==
Rogers was born to Richard and Katrina Rogers and raised on Long Island, New York. Rogers attended Islip High School and was named prom king at his senior prom. Rogers was on his high school's cross country team and ran a 4:36-mile at age fifteen, and during his senior year of high school he scored a perfect 100 on his New York State Regents English examination and a 5 on both the AP Language and Composition exam and the AP English Literature exam. After graduating, he earned a BFA in dramatic writing from New York University (NYU). While studying there, Rogers became a member of the improvisational group Hammerkatz and started studying at the Upright Citizens Brigade (UCB) in 2009. It was while at NYU that Rogers first met Bowen Yang.

== Career ==
While studying at UCB, Rogers performed in several shows, including Characters Welcome and Pop Roulette: Amazing Earth; he also performed on the Maude team Choir and served as the artistic director of the musical sketch comedy group, Pop Roulette. In 2011, Rogers worked as an intern on the set of Teen Mom 2. In 2016, Rogers was recognized as a "Comic to Watch" by Comedy Central.

Since 2016, Rogers has co-hosted the podcast Las Culturistas with fellow NYU alumnus Bowen Yang. Guests on the show have included Alan Cumming, Bianca Del Rio, Katie Couric, Michelle Yeoh, Trixie Mattel, Sean Hayes, Will Ferrell, Lady Gaga and Mariah Carey.

In 2020, Rogers hosted two television competition series. Gayme Show, co-hosted with Dave Mizzoni, was based on a popular comedy night in which straight men were quizzed on queer culture; the show aired for one season on the streaming platform Quibi. The show was renewed for a second season, but Quibi closed in October 2020 before it could be produced. Also in 2020, Rogers became the host of Haute Dog, which aired on HBO Max and saw dog groomers compete for a cash prize.

As an actor, Rogers has made guest appearances on multiple television series, including Shrill, Awkwafina Is Nora from Queens, and Search Party. In 2021, it was announced that Rogers would have a starring role on the comedy series I Love That for You, in addition to a supporting role in the film Fire Island, a gay retelling of Pride and Prejudice.

As a voice actor, Rogers serves as the voice of several recurring characters on the comedy series Our Cartoon President. Since 2021, he has voiced the character of Twink on the Netflix comedy Q-Force, on which he also serves as a writer.

In December 2022 Rogers released his musical comedy special, Have You Heard of Christmas? on Showtime. The special follows Rogers's journey to entering the Christmas canon as the "Pop Prince of Christmas". The TV special features original songs and guest appearances by Bowen Yang, Josh Sharp, and Aaron Jackson. The comedy special was developed into Rogers's debut album of the same name, which was released in November 2023 under Capitol Records.

== Personal life ==
After living in Brooklyn for an extended period, Rogers moved to Los Angeles as of 2019 and has since described himself as bicoastal with homes in both Los Angeles and New York City. Rogers is gay, having come out while a student at NYU. Rogers is also red-green color blind.

Rogers previously dated and lived with musician and frequent collaborator, Henry Koperski. Rogers also dated Below Deck cast member Fraser Olender.

== Filmography ==
=== Film ===
Year	Title	Role	Notes
2018	The After Party	Max	
2020	Cicada	Phillip	Uncredited
2022	Fire Island	Luke	
2022	Lyle, Lyle, Crocodile	Show Host	
2025	Good Fortune	Peter	
2026	Stop! That! Train!	Press Secretary	

=== Television ===
Year	Title	Role	Notes
2013	Above Average Presents	Jonas	Episode: "We Meet Again (Star Wars Parody)"
2015	Criminal Crimes	Detective Keebler	2 episodes
2016	Katy in the Bush		Episode: "Appreciating Your Friends"
2016–2018	The Special Without Brett Davis	Various Roles	3 episodes
2017	Above Average Presents	Various Roles	3 episodes
2017	Who Wants to Be a Millionaire	Contestant	2 episodes
2017–2018	Characters Welcome	Various Roles	3 episodes
2018	Comedy Central's Thank You, Goodnight!	Himself	Episode: "Joel Kim Booster (Featuring Shalewa Sharpe)"
2019–2020	Our Cartoon President	Various Roles	21 episodes
2020	Shrill	Chastain Handler	Episode: "WAHAM"
2020	Awkwafina Is Nora from Queens	Justin Schultz-Boudreaux	Episode: "Launch Party"
2020	Gayme Show	Co-Host	8 episodes
2020	Search Party	Gay Man	Episode: "A National Affair"
2020	Haute Dog	Host	6 episodes
2021	Q-Force	Twink	Main role
2022	Fairview	Luck Dragon (voice)	Episode: "Crypto"
2022	I Love That for You	Darcy Leeds	Main role
2022	Celebrity Jeopardy	Contestant	
2022	Big Mouth	Bros 4 Life Member No. 3 (voice)	Episode: "Dadda Dia!"
2022	Have You Heard of Christmas?	Himself	TV special
2022–present	Late Night With Seth Meyers	Himself	5 episodes
2022–present	Watch What Happens Live with Andy Cohen	Himself	8 episodes
2023	Love Trip: Paris	Narrator	8 episodes
2023	History of the World, Part II	Movie Announcer (voice)	Episode: "VIII"
2023	Glamorous	Tony	Episode: "Are You on the List?"
2023	American Dad!	Jared Leto (voice)	Episode: "Productive Panic"
2023	Scott Pilgrim Takes Off	TV Gossip No. 2 (voice)	Episode: "Whatever"
2023	RuPaul's Drag Race All Stars	Himself	Guest judge; Episode: "Snatch Game of Love"
2023	RuPaul's Drag Race All Stars: Untucked	Himself	Special guest; Episode: "All Stars Untucked: Snatch Game of Love"
2024	RuPaul's Drag Race	Himself	Special guest; Episode: "Booked & Blessed"
2024	RuPaul's Drag Race Global All Stars	Himself	Guest judge; Episode: "International Queen of Mystery Ball"
2024	Jentry Chau vs. the Underworld	Billy Bowie (voice)	Episode: "Forget the Alamo"
2024	No Good Deed	Greg Boycelane	6 episodes
2025	The Late Show with Stephen Colbert	Himself	Episode: "Matt Rogers/Bowen Yang/Ocean Vuong"
2025	Overcompensating	Jared	3 episodes
2025	Palm Royale	Bruce	Episode: "Maxine Plays Dead"
2025–2026	Las Culturistas Culture Awards	Himself / Host	TV Specials
2027	Mr. & Mrs. Smith	Another John	TBD

=== Writer ===
Year	Title	Notes
2021	The Other Two	staff writer, 10 episodes
2021	Q-Force	Episode: "EuropeVision"; staff writer, 10 episodes
2022	Have You Heard of Christmas?	TV Special
2025 - 2026	Las Culturistas Culture Awards	TV Special

== Discography ==
All song credits adapted from Spotify and Apple Music.

=== As lead artist ===
==== Singles ====
Year	Title	Album	Writer(s)	Producer(s)
2024	"Santa Boy"	Have You Heard of Christmas?	Matt Rogers, Ethan Christopher, Henry Koperski	Gabe Lopez, Leland
2023	"Have You Heard of Christmas?"	Have You Heard of Christmas?	Matt Rogers, Henry Koperski	Gabe Lopez, Leland
2023	"Everything You Want" (featuring MUNA)	Have You Heard of Christmas?	Matt Rogers, Brett McLaughlin	Gabe Lopez, Leland
2023	"Also It's Christmas"	Have You Heard of Christmas?	Matt Rogers, Henry Koperski	Gabe Lopez, Leland

==== Studio albums ====
Title	Details
Have You Heard of Christmas?	Released: November 3, 2023; Label: Capitol Records; Format: Digital download, streaming; Track listing: 1. "Also It's Christmas"; 2. "Lube for the Sleigh"; 3. "Have You Heard of Christmas?"; 4. "Hottest Female Up in Whoville"; 5. "Every Christmas Eve (Mrs. Claus' Theme)"; 6. "RockaFellaCenta" (featuring Bowen Yang); 7. "Everything You Want" (featuring MUNA); 8. "Rum Pum Pum"; 9. "Immah Have Your Back (This Christmas)" (featuring Leland and Vincint); 10. "God's up to His Tricks!"; 11. "Rain on Christmas"; 12. "I Don't Need it to Be Christmas at All"

=== As featured artist ===
==== Singles ====
Year	Title	Album	Writer(s)	Producer(s)
2025	"Cancer (Boo Hoo)" (Retrograde The Musical featuring Matt Rogers)	Retrograde The Musical (Studio Cast Recording)	Nick Laughlin, Richard C. Walter, Drew Louis, Jesse Saint John	Drew Louis

== Awards and nominations ==
Year	Association	Work	Category	Result	Ref.
2019	Shorty Awards	Las Culturistas	Best Podcast	Nominated	
2021	iHeartRadio Podcast Awards	Las Culturistas	Best Pop Culture Podcast	Nominated	
2022	iHeartRadio Podcast Awards	Las Culturistas	Best Comedy Podcast	Nominated	
2022	Gotham Awards	Fire Island	Ensemble Tribute	Won	
2023	iHeartRadio Podcast Awards	Las Culturistas	Podcast of the Year	Won	
2023	iHeartRadio Podcast Awards	Las Culturistas	Best Comedy Podcast	Nominated	
2026	Tony Awards	Titanique	Best Musical	Nominated	
