= Dave Becky =

American comedy manager and producer

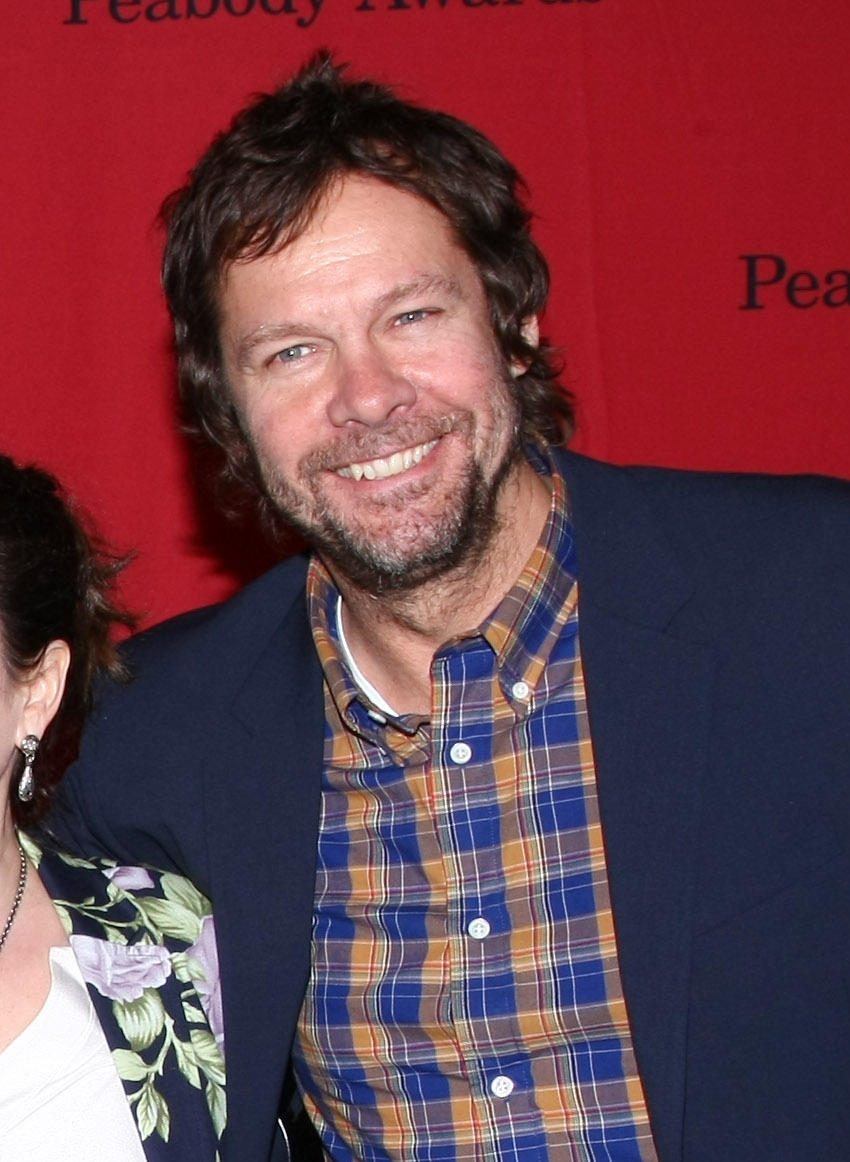
- Becky in May 2013
- Born: United States
- Occupations: Comedy talent manager, producer
- Spouse: Lainie Sorkin
- Children: 3

Dave Becky is an American comedy talent manager and producer. He works with 3 Arts Entertainment and has more than 100 production credits. He has received nine Emmy nominations for his work as an executive producer on the Netflix series Master of None and various productions with comedian Louis C.K. He has shared in two Peabody Awards for his work as an executive producer on two FX series, Louie (2012) and Better Things (2016). Becky also serves as an executive producer on Russian Doll on Netflix and Insecure on HBO.

Becky's comedy clients include Kevin Hart, Issa Rae, Natasha Lyonne, Aziz Ansari, Amy Poehler, Bill Burr and Hannibal Buress. Former clients include Louis C.K., Pamela Adlon, John Mulaney, Nasim Pedrad and Mitch Hedberg.

== Career ==
Becky is an executive producer on Broad City due to his representation of Poehler, as well as an executive producer on Making It, Better Things, Baskets, Insecure, and Everybody Hates Chris. He was also executive producer of Netflix series Master of None, co-created by Ansari, and numerous productions with then-client Louis C.K., including the FX television shows Louie (credited 2013-2015) and Better Things (co-created by C.K. and Adlon) and comedy specials Louis C.K.: Live At The Beacon Theater (released on FX in 2012), Louis C.K.: Oh My God (2013, HBO), Louie C.K.: Live at the Comedy Store (2015, released through C.K.'s website), and Louis C.K. 2017 (Netflix). He was a producer on the 2017 Sony comedy film Rough Night.

Regarding his management style, Becky said in a 2012 interview that he chooses clients "based on the strength of their original voice and whether that voice excites me". He further stated that his most successful clients all shared certain qualities, saying that "they are hard-working, dedicated good people, inside and out".

== Sexual misconduct allegations against Louis C.K. ==
In November 2017, comedian and Becky client Louis C.K. was accused by five women of sexual misconduct in an exposé by The New York Times, allegations C.K. later confirmed. In the initial Times story, comedians Dana Min Goodman and Julia Wolov accused Becky of telling them, via their managers, not to speak about their experience of C.K. exposing himself and masturbating in front of them after a show in 2002; given Becky's influence in comedy, the then-early-career comedians feared professional reprisal. 3 Arts Entertainment subsequently dropped C.K. as a client and Becky issued a statement apologising "for not listening to and not understanding what happened to Dana and Julia", saying he had initially perceived some of the harassment allegations as a "matter of infidelity" and not as sexual misconduct. Publications such as Paste and Splitsider called for Becky's dismissal from 3 Arts Entertainment. Bill Burr, a client of Becky, stood by him, calling Becky "one of the great people I've met in this business". Pamela Adlon, until then a client of Becky, severed ties with him and 3 Arts following the scandal.

In C.K.'s apology for the incidents, he expressed regret "that this has brought negative attention to my manager Dave Becky who only tried to mediate a situation that I caused".

== Personal life ==
Becky is married to talent manager Lainie Sorkin Becky. She also worked at 3 Arts Entertainment until 2005 when she joined 360 Management; as of 2013, her clients at 360 Management included Miley Cyrus, Mary Steenburgen and Emily Deschanel. She became a partner in 2013.

The couple have three children and reside in the Brentwood neighborhood of Los Angeles.

== Awards and nominations ==
Becky has nine Emmy nominations as an executive producer: two for Master of None (2016 and 2017), and seven for projects with Louis C.K. (2012–2017).

Becky has shared in two Peabody Awards: in 2012, with six fellow members of the cast and crew of Louie and in 2016 with 14 other members of the cast and crew of Better Things.
