= Haute Dog =

American dog grooming reality TV show

- Genre: reality competition
- Country of origin: United States
- Original language: English
- No. of seasons: 1
- No. of episodes: 12

Production
- Producers: Tony Hernandez; Séamus Murphy-Mitchell; Brooke Posch; Nicolle Yaron
- Production company: Jax Media

Original release
- Network: HBO Max
- Release: September 24, 2020 – February 4, 2021

Haute Dog is an American reality competition television series that premiered on HBO Max on September 24, 2020.

== Premise ==
Each episode follows three dog groomers as they compete in a series of challenges and find the best look for their dogs. Celebrity dog groomer Jess Rona provides commentary and judges, alongside Robin Thede. Matt Rogers hosts.

== Production ==
Principal photography wrapped in August 2020 in Simi Valley, California, following safety protocols and guidelines due to the COVID-19 pandemic.
