= Fire Island (film) =

2022 film directed by Andrew Ahn

- Official release poster
- Directed by: Andrew Ahn
- Written by: Joel Kim Booster
- Produced by: John Hodges; Brooke Posch; Tony Hernandez
- Starring: Joel Kim Booster; Bowen Yang; Conrad Ricamora; James Scully; Margaret Cho
- Cinematography: Felipe Vara de Rey
- Edited by: Brian A. Kates
- Music by: Jay Wadley
- Production company: Jax Media
- Distributed by: Searchlight Pictures
- Release date: June 3, 2022
- Running time: 105 minutes
- Country: United States
- Language: English
- Budget: $10 million

Fire Island is a 2022 American romantic comedy film directed by Andrew Ahn and written by and starring Joel Kim Booster. The film co-stars Bowen Yang, Conrad Ricamora, James Scully, and Margaret Cho. The plot follows a group of gay friends on vacation at the eponymous New York island, where romance becomes complicated by classism in a story inspired by Jane Austen's Pride and Prejudice. Distributed and produced by Searchlight Pictures, the film was released June 3, 2022 on Hulu, to generally positive reviews.

== Plot ==
Every year, Noah and his close friends Howie, Luke, Keegan, and Max embark on a weeklong vacation to Fire Island, noted for its gay villages. The group takes the ferry from Sayville, New York on Long Island's South Shore to Fire Island Pines and reunite with their "house mother" Erin. Erin reveals that she has to sell her house, making this the last week they will spend together on the island. The group meets Charlie, a doctor, and his wealthy friends, including Will, a lawyer, and Cooper. Howie and Charlie take interest in each other. Noah decides that his mission for the trip is for Howie to get laid. Charlie invites the group to his house, where the group gets drunk, feeling condescended to by the other guests. Luke and Keegan cause a scene as Charlie and Howie get closer. Noah overhears Will criticizing the group, worrying that Charlie might get ripped off, and saying Noah is 'fine' but 'not hot enough to be that annoying'.

Howie spends the night in the bath tub and the next day, Noah goes to collect him. He invites Charlie and his friends to dinner at Erin's as a thank you for looking after Howie. At the grocery store, Noah meets Dex and they flirt. Upon discovering that Will dislikes Dex, Noah invites Dex to dinner as well. Charlie, Cooper, and Will arrive for dinner, and Will spots an Alice Munro book belonging to Noah. To both Will's and Noah's surprise, they hit it off by discussing books. Dex arrives, flanked by Luke and Keegan, making Will uncomfortable. Dex claims that Will judges him for making content on OnlyFans.

Howie tells the group that he and Charlie kissed, making Noah more intent on making the two a match. The group attends the weekly underwear party in Cherry Grove and do an assortment of illicit drugs. Cooper implies to Noah that he wants Will for himself and accuses Noah's growing attraction to Will of being based on money.

Noah meets up with Dex again. They head to the dark room to have sex, but Noah is distracted by Will and accidentally hits Dex in the nose. This causes a public confrontation between Cooper, Will, Dex, and Noah, during which Noah sees Charlie making out with another man who turns out to be Charlie's ex, Rhys. Noah gathers his intoxicated friends and a distraught Howie. Noah walks back to the Pines with Will and they fight. Noah accuses Will of being uptight and judgmental, and Will tells Noah that Noah is pretentious even if he pretends not to be. At an afterparty in the Pines, Howie and Noah fight. Howie wants to give up on searching for romance and tells Noah that their experiences are not the same just because they are both gay and Asian, citing issues of body dysmorphia.

Noah is woken up the next day by his friends delivering a letter from Will, in which he apologizes for the remarks he made after he first met Noah and explains that Dex hurt someone close to him in the past. Charlie arrives to tell Howie that he has gotten back together with Rhys, who has Lyme disease, and will be leaving the island sooner than expected.

Noah runs into Will at a drag bar. Will shows Noah Dex's Instagram profile, on which he posts thirst traps with activism tags ("Black Lives Matter" and "Stop Asian Hate") to get attention. Noah and Will grow closer. Later, the group learn that Dex has posted a video of him and Luke having sex online without Luke's consent. Will helps Noah confront Dex by threatening legal action. Dex agrees to take down the video.

The next day, Howie tells Noah he is leaving because he cannot get over Charlie's rejection. Noah confronts Charlie, who acknowledges that he has feelings for Howie. Noah and his friends hijack a water taxi to catch up to Howie. Charlie express his feelings to Howie, and they kiss. The group goes to watch the sunset. Noah and Will dance together and finally kiss, agreeing to give their relationship a try.

== Cast ==
- Joel Kim Booster as Noah, based on Elizabeth Bennet
- Bowen Yang as Howie, based on Jane Bennet and Charlotte Lucas
- Conrad Ricamora as Will, based on Fitzwilliam Darcy
- James Scully as Charlie, based on Charles Bingley
- Margaret Cho as Erin, based on Mr. and Mrs. Bennet
- Matt Rogers as Luke, based on Lydia Bennet
- Tomás Matos as Keegan, based on Kitty Bennet
- Torian Miller as Max, based on Mary Bennet
- Nick Adams as Cooper, based on both Caroline Bingley and Lady Catherine de Bourgh
- Zane Phillips as Dex, based on George Wickham
- Michael Graceffa as Rhys, based on Anne de Bourgh
- Aidan Wharton as Braden
- John Roberts as Pat
- Robert Clohessy as Detective Jack
- Peter Smith as Moses, based on Mr Collins
- Bradley Gibson as Johnny

== Production ==
Streaming television network Quibi announced development of a comedy series titled Trip in September 2019, starring, created, and written by Joel Kim Booster. The project was given a series order on March 11, 2020, with Jax Media set to produce. Bowen Yang was cast in a lead role on April 15, 2020. Booster and Yang, who are both out gay Asian comedians and "life-changing" friends, were set to play fictionalized versions of themselves. Closet Monster filmmaker Stephen Dunn was attached to direct the series. Upon the shutdown of Quibi on December 1, 2020, the entire project was jeopardized.

Searchlight Pictures announced the purchase of Booster's script on June 30, 2021, to produce as a feature film re-titled Fire Island. Spa Night director Andrew Ahn replaced Dunn as director. The following month, Margaret Cho joined the cast of the film, as the only woman to be part of the film's cast. Conrad Ricamora, James Scully, Matt Rogers, Tomas Matos, Torian Miller, and Nick Adams were added to the film in August 2021, with Zane Phillips, Michael Graceffa, Aidan Wharton, Peter Smith, and Bradley Gibson joining the ensemble cast. Principal photography began August 12, 2021, and was scheduled to last through September 2021, with filming taking place in Manhattan, Brooklyn, and Fire Island, the locale of the film's title. The final script incorporated humorous topics the filmmakers had long shared as friends.

== Release ==
The film was released June 3, 2022, on Hulu in the United States, Star+ in Latin America, and later released on June 17 Disney+ via Star in other international territories.

== Reception ==
=== Audience viewership ===
According to Whip Media's viewership tracking app TV Time, Fire Island was the eighth most anticipated film during the month of June 2022. According to the streaming aggregator Reelgood, Fire Island was the sixth most streamed movie across all platforms during the week of June 11, 2022.

=== Critical reception ===
Fire Island received positive reviews from critics upon release. On the review aggregator website Rotten Tomatoes, 94% of 112 critics' reviews are positive, with an average rating of 7.4/10. The website's consensus reads: "Brought to life by a tremendously talented cast, the breezily entertaining Fire Island proves there are still fresh ways to update Austen." On Metacritic, the film has a weighted average score of 72 out of 100 based on reviews from 32 critics, indicating "generally favorable" reviews.

Alex Abad-Santos of Vox applauded Fire Island for being a high-profile comedy movie that dares to focus on gay men's sex lives without providing debauchery, and found the screenplay ambitious for its approach on social expectations, stereotypes, and racism. He also praised the film's take on friendship between LGBT people, while complimenting the chemistry between Joel Kim Booster and Bowen Yang's characters. David Fear of Rolling Stone found Fire Island to be a love letter to the LGBT community and its culture, writing, "This romantic comedy has its share of those archetypes. It also has gay lead characters, gay love interests, gay heroes, gay villains, and gay people of color galore. That doesn't excuse some of the clunkier, more brochure-friendly scenarios that Fire Island throws at them. But it does give you the warmest gratitude towards the persons who, by bringing everyone to this picture-perfect spot and inviting them to the party in the Pines, had been the means of uniting them."

Siddhant Adlakha of IGN rated the movie 9/10 and wrote: "Indie director Andrew Ahn creates a mainstream queer classic with the romcom Fire Island, his inventive modern adaptation of Pride and Prejudice. Following a group of gay friends on a wild vacation, it features some of the funniest and most tension-filled scenes in any movie this year. As complete as any piece of entertainment can be." Jude Dry of IndieWire gave the film an "A−" rating. Dry found Booster's screenplay amusing and stated that Andrew Ahn's direction "brings a cinematic touch that elevates the comedy."

Odie Henderson of RogerEbert.com rated the movie three out of four stars and called it an entertaining and heartfelt romantic comedy film. Henderson complimented Booster's screenplay for its humor and its approach on racial issues, and praised Ahn's approach to plot lines and characters conflicts. Henderson also singled out cinematographer Felipe Vara de Rey, saying he manages to provide a nostalgic feeling about the island of the same name. Jennifer Green of Common Sense Media rated the film three out of five stars and complimented the movie for its depiction of positive messages and role models, as well as its diverse characters of different origins and sexualities. Green stated Fire Island manages to approach issues raised by heteronormativity and social expectations.

=== Accolades ===
Award	Date of ceremony	Category	Recipient(s)	Result	Ref.
Artios Awards	March 7, 2024	Outstanding Achievement in Casting – Film, Non-Theatrical Release	Jessica Munks, Andrew Fem	Won	
Dorian Awards	June 26, 2023	Best TV Movie or Miniseries	Fire Island	Won	
GLAAD Media Awards	May 13, 2023	Outstanding Film – Streaming or TV	Fire Island	Won	
Gotham Awards	November 28, 2022	Ensemble Tribute	Nick Adams, Joel Kim Booster, Margaret Cho, Tomás Matos, Torian Miller, Zane Phillips, Conrad Ricamora, Matt Rogers, James Scully, and Bowen Yang	Won	
Hollywood Critics Association TV Awards	January 8, 2024	Best Streaming Movie	Fire Island	Nominated	
Independent Spirit Awards	March 4, 2023	Best First Screenplay	Joel Kim Booster	Nominated	
Mill Valley Film Festival	October 15, 2022	10 Screenwriters to Watch	Joel Kim Booster	Won	
Primetime Creative Arts Emmy Awards	January 6–7, 2024	Outstanding Television Movie	Fire Island	Nominated	
Primetime Creative Arts Emmy Awards	January 6–7, 2024	Outstanding Writing for a Limited or Anthology Series or Movie	Joel Kim Booster	Nominated	
Producers Guild of America Awards	February 25, 2023	Outstanding Producer of Streamed or Televised Motion Pictures	John Hodges and Brooke Posch	Nominated	
