= Driveways (film) =

2019 American independent film

- Official promotional poster
- Directed by: Andrew Ahn
- Written by: Hannah Bos; Paul Thureen
- Produced by: Joe Pirro; James Schamus; Nicolaas Bertelsen; Celine Rattray; Trudie Styler; JP Prugnaud MCL
- Starring: Hong Chau; Lucas Jaye; Jerry Adler; Robyn Payne; Christine Ebersole; Brian Dennehy
- Cinematography: Ki Jin Kim
- Edited by: Katherine McQuerry
- Music by: Jay Wadley
- Production companies: Maven Pictures; Allusionist Picture House; Studio Mao; Symbolic Exchange; CinemaWerks
- Distributed by: FilmRise
- Release dates: February 10, 2019 (Berlinale); May 7, 2020 (United States)
- Running time: 83 minutes
- Country: United States
- Language: English

Driveways is a 2019 American drama film directed by Andrew Ahn and starring Hong Chau, Lucas Jaye, and Brian Dennehy, from an original screenplay by playwrights Hannah Bos and Paul Thureen. The film had its world premiere at the Berlin International Film Festival on February 10, and its American premiere at the Tribeca Film Festival April 30. FilmRise released it via video-on-demand in the United States on May 7, 2020, in lieu of a theatrical release due to the COVID-19 pandemic. It tells the story of a woman who has come to the house of her late sister to pack it up and prepare it for sale. While there, her young son strikes up a friendship with an elderly widower living next door.

Met with critical acclaim, the film was nominated for Best First Screenplay and Best Female Lead at the 2020 Film Independent Spirit Awards. Praise focused primarily on two aspects of the film: its depiction of the connections among neighbors, something many people had come to miss due to the social distancing measures taken to control the pandemic, and Dennehy's performance. He had died a month prior to release, and critics said it was an excellent final film for him. (Note: It was Dennehy's last film as a lead. 3 Days with Dad, made after Driveways, was released in September 2019, and Son of the South, shot in April 2019, released in February 2021.)

Ahn chose Bos and Thureen's script, derived from their childhoods in the Midwest, for his second feature out of a desire to direct something that was an intimate family drama, not written by him. He also wanted to get away from the gay Korean American milieu in which his debut, Spa Night, was set, although he did later change two main characters from white to Asian for artistic reasons. Maven Pictures backed the production, and filming took place in summer 2018 in the Hudson Valley region of New York, primarily around Poughkeepsie.

== Synopsis ==
Late one summer night in a residential neighborhood in upstate New York, a car pulls up to a dark house. Kathy and her son Cody have come to the house with their sleeping bags. They find the house has no electricity and leave for a nearby motel. Del, an elderly widower next door, watches them from his upstairs window.

The next morning Kathy calls the electric utility to have power restored to her recently deceased older sister April's house; Kathy has come to pack it up and sell it. She learns that April owed the electric company $900. Upon returning to the house they realize that April was a hoarder.

Cody goes outside and tries to get some water to drink from a hose. Del sees him from his porch and tells him to turn the faucet the other way, and Cody does, wetting his shirt in the process. Kathy sees this and assumes that Cody bothered Del. She explains her presence and curtly tells Del she does not let her son talk to strangers. But later, when she learns Del's ride to a local veterans' event has not shown up, Kathy takes him to the local Veterans of Foreign Wars (VFW) lodge herself, while complaining about the electric bill.

When Kathy and Cody return to April's house the next day, they discover that Del has run an extension cord across the driveway from his house to theirs. Later, Kathy and Cody visit Charlene, a local realtor, to list the house. Kathy balks at taking Charlene on a walk-through, but after Charlene tells her that the house does not need to be presentable she relents. When Charlene sees the inside, she understands why Kathy had reservations.

That night at the motel Cody asks Kathy about April, whom she did not know well since April was 12 years older. The next day, Cody meets two other neighborhood children while cleaning some furniture in the driveway. Cody also sees two other boys, Brandon and Reese, imitating professional wrestlers. The boys' grandmother, Linda, comes to greet Kathy outside. Linda recalls that April was a nice woman who did not want anyone to come into the house.

Kathy and Cody check out of the motel and start sleeping in the house. Del helps Cody bury a dead cat, and takes him to bingo at the VFW.

Linda one day offers to watch Cody while Kathy does some errands, but he does not share Brandon and Reese's love of wrestling and vomits from anxiety rather than wrestle them. He runs out of Linda's house and back home. Del sees him and recalls how he, too, vomited once as a younger man while on a troop ship to the Korean War. Thereafter, Cody spends more time with the quieter Del.

Kathy eventually gets the house clean enough to live in, and holds a yard sale. She suggests to Cody the possibility that instead of selling the house they move into it, which he supports. At the same time, Del's daughter, a judge in Seattle, tells him space has become available in a nursing home near her.

Cody invites Del and the other neighborhood children to his birthday party at a local roller rink; when Del is the only invitee to show up they relocate to the VFW lodge and celebrate with Del's friends.

Cody tells Del that he and his mother are planning to move in, and Del tells Cody he will be moving to be closer to his daughter and her wife. Upset, Cody runs off, but Del later finds and comforts him. Later, on the day Del moves out, he and Cody have a last conversation on his porch. Cody says Kathy told him they could still take the long trip to visit Del. Del jokes about Cody hitchhiking across the country, leading Del to recall a similar hitchhiking trip he took with a friend after leaving the Army, and ruminate about how it has since seemed like so many years have gone by so quickly but how he would not change much of it.

== Cast ==
- Hong Chau as Kathy
- Lucas Jaye as Cody
- Brian Dennehy as Del
- Christine Ebersole as Linda
- Jerry Adler as Rodger
- Stan Carp as Lester
- Bill Buell as Tom
- Robyn Payne as Charlene
- Samantha Jones as Lisa
- Sophia DeStefano as Anna
- Jeter Rivera as Miguel
- Jack Caleb as Brandon
- James DiGiacomo as Reese
- Joe Felece as Bingo Caller
- Jennifer Delora as Cheryl
- Laurent Rejto as Cashier

== Production ==
After the success of Spa Night, his feature debut, director Andrew Ahn was looking for his next project to be something more distant from his personal experience. "I felt really sick of myself", he told Filmmaker. "I didn't want to talk about being gay and Korean-American anymore." (Note: Later, he did say that he saw Driveways as related to his first film. "It explores the same themes in different ways," he said at the 2019 Provincetown International Film Festival.)

According to Chau, who had already reached out to Ahn to express interest in working with him, she was even further intrigued when he told her how he had told the producers that for his second film he was interested in telling an intimate family story. She found it a departure from the ambitions of most directors of well-regarded debut features, who in her experience want to move on to big-budget franchise pictures. "I thought, 'I got to ride with this guy.'"

Paul Thureen says the inspiration for the story came from his co-writer Hannah Bos's background working in her mother's antique shop as a child. "She usually had to go into people's houses after they died", he recalled. "So she's interested in the stories objects tell about people." Kathy and Cody's relationship is modeled on Bos's relationship with her mother.

The hitchhiking trip Del recounts taking as a younger man after his military service in the film's closing monologue is similar to one Thureen's father took at a similar stage in his life. Thureen, like Cody, was shy and anxious to the point of vomiting before his own birthday parties or other stressful social events, as a child, leading him to value relationships with adults.

"What I love about Hannah and Paul's writing is that they understand characters so well and the dramatics of a scene," Ahn said, particularly singling their work out for the respect they showed their characters. "There's a real tension to their work but in a beautifully subtle way, and they are doing things that I wouldn't be able to do." Specifically, in Driveways he pointed to Del's final monologue as one of them.

=== Preproduction ===
Ahn had considered many scripts before Joe Pirro sent him Driveways. After reading it for the first time in a crowded coffeeshop, he realized he needed to read it again, alone, at home, to fully appreciate it; when he did it brought tears to his eyes. "I was blown away by how human it felt." Thematically, he said, "it explores what it means to connect with someone else ... that despite these barriers between us, we can find something really human and soulful."

Ironically, for Ahn, given his initial desire to do something as unlike his first film as possible, he suggested that Kathy and Cody be written as Asian rather than White in order to emphasize their otherness in April's community, which gave some of the existing dialogue, such as Kathy's first meeting with Linda, additional layers. The producers, Ahn recalled, were excited by the idea.

Other than that, the film does not reference their ethnicity, something Chau appreciated. "I certainly would not have signed up for the film if Kathy and Cody were just two-dimensional characters who existed solely to experience blatant racism or microaggressions, so that the audience could be delivered some clunky message about how racism is bad." Ahn also found some items that seemed like distinctly Asian items for April to have hoarded, but did not actually suggest any to the film's production designer. (Note: Some critics also detected a "queer sensibility" in the film; in particular they wondered if Cody might be gay. Ahn agrees that element is there, since there are elements of himself as a child in Cody, but says "it wasn't something I wanted to push too hard or force on the character". "That for me was really exciting ... to make a queer film that wasn't necessarily explicitly about queerness.")

The story was originally set in western Illinois, where writers Hannah Bos and Paul Thureen had grown up. Ahn found the move to the Hudson Valley of New York, to also be ironic since it led to principal photography taking place mostly in and around Poughkeepsie, where Bos and Thureen had met as students at Vassar College. The script did not require much revision to reflect that change.

Where Spa Night had been difficult to finance due to its subject matter, relying in part on money raised through Kickstarter, Ahn said, Driveways utilized traditional American independent film financing, which depended on the actors attached to the project. Dennehy had been one of the first actors to commit to the film, after he liked the script. (Note: According to Chau, when Ahn's older brother, who took no interest in his brother's film career, found out that Andrew would be making a movie with Dennehy, was excited to learn his brother would be working with the actor known for playing Sheriff Teasle in First Blood, the first of the Rambo movies.) Hong Chau, after seeing Spa Night at theaters, had emailed Ahn and told him she would be willing to do anything he wanted her to do in his next film; Ahn had coffee with her and came to believe that "she would bring that humanity to the character I was looking for." Maven Pictures soon took the film on.

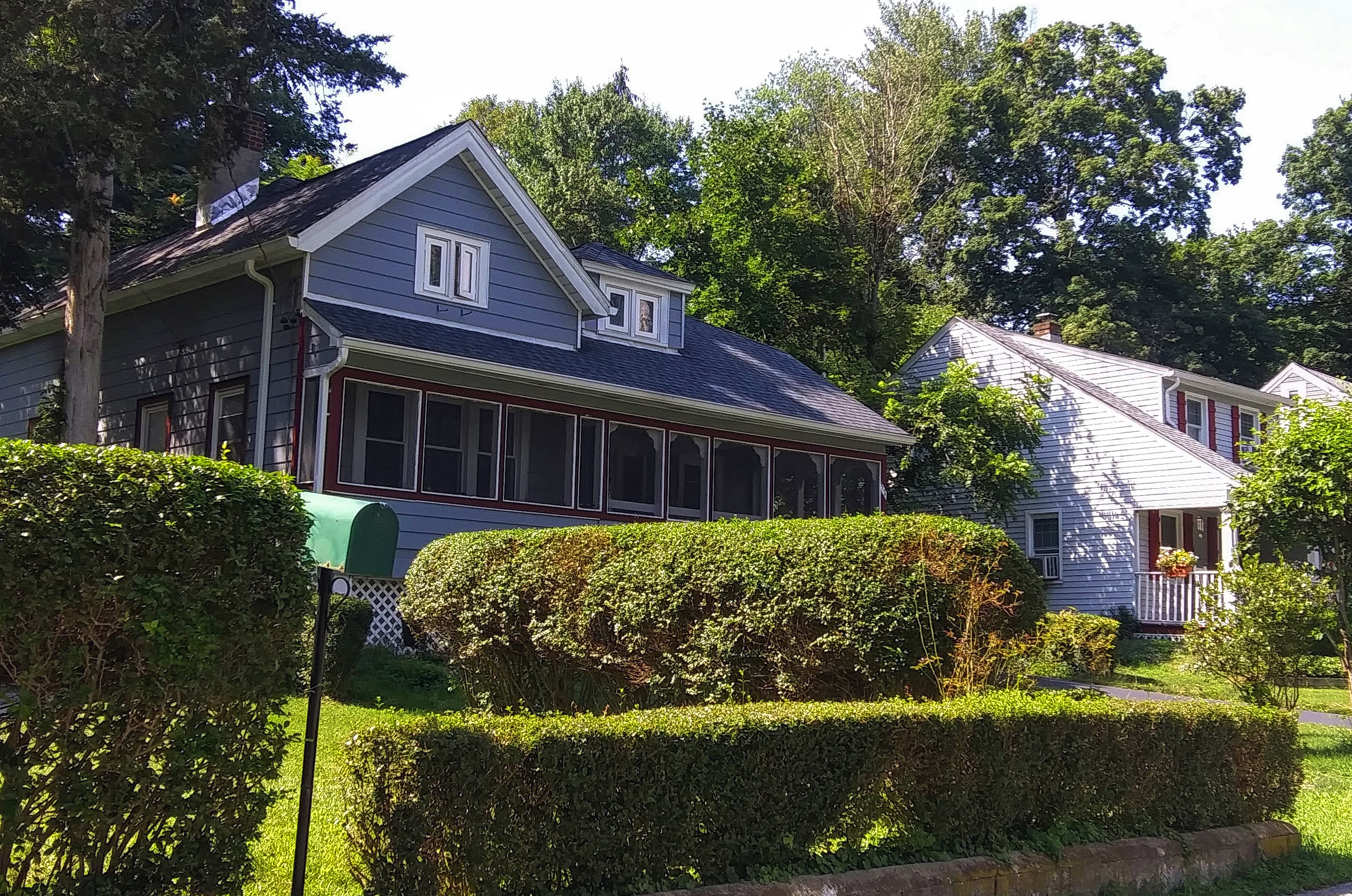
The two houses used in the film, seen in July 2021

Ahn was not comfortable beginning production in 2018 until a pair of houses, both with porches, separated by a driveway, could be found to serve as the film's primary location. "I really wanted an authenticity of space and place", he explained. "That continuity was important for the actors, that they could walk in and walk out of a space and not have to separate between the two. We wouldn't have to shoot one part of the scene in one location on one day and then another part of the scene at a different location on another day." Ahn, the producers and the location scout searched all over the Poughkeepsie area; ultimately they asked a local real estate broker, who turned out to not only know exactly where there was a pair of houses that fit the film's specifications, but was familiar with the families that lived in them.

It was important to Ahn as well that it be clear the neighborhood, while residential, was not in a city. He believed a "small-town feel" would accentuate the initial wariness Kathy and Cody felt, especially as minorities, who mostly live in cities. "At the same time, we also wanted to capture the natural beauty of the space." Ahn drove around looking for some of the other locations since he wanted to be as familiar with the area as possible in order to portray it effectively.

Lucas Jaye, who had previously had a recurring role in Fuller House but had not been in any films before, was the last of the three leads to be cast; his parents almost missed sending in his audition tape by the deadline as they had forgotten to send it before a family trip to Disneyland.

Chau read with only him, which came as a great relief to her since she did not look forward to having to choose among children. She credited casting director Avy Kaufman with having narrowed the choice down to Jaye; Ahn told her later that he had also come to the same conclusion and wanted to see how well she and Jaye worked together.

The production's relative proximity to New York City also helped make it possible for Christine Ebersole to play Linda. She was performing on Broadway at the time, and "could come and do a couple hours on our set and then go back down to New York City for an evening performance. It really worked out for us." The actress enjoyed doing the part because of the filmmakers' openness to her interpretation. "There were absolutely no impediments to figuring out who this character was.

Costume designer Matthew Simonelli suggested to Ahn that Cody and Kathy should wear some of the same shirts in different scenes, as the characters had come to town expecting to spend no more than a few days packing up April's house at first and would likely find themselves forced to share clothes when they extended their stay.

=== Filming ===
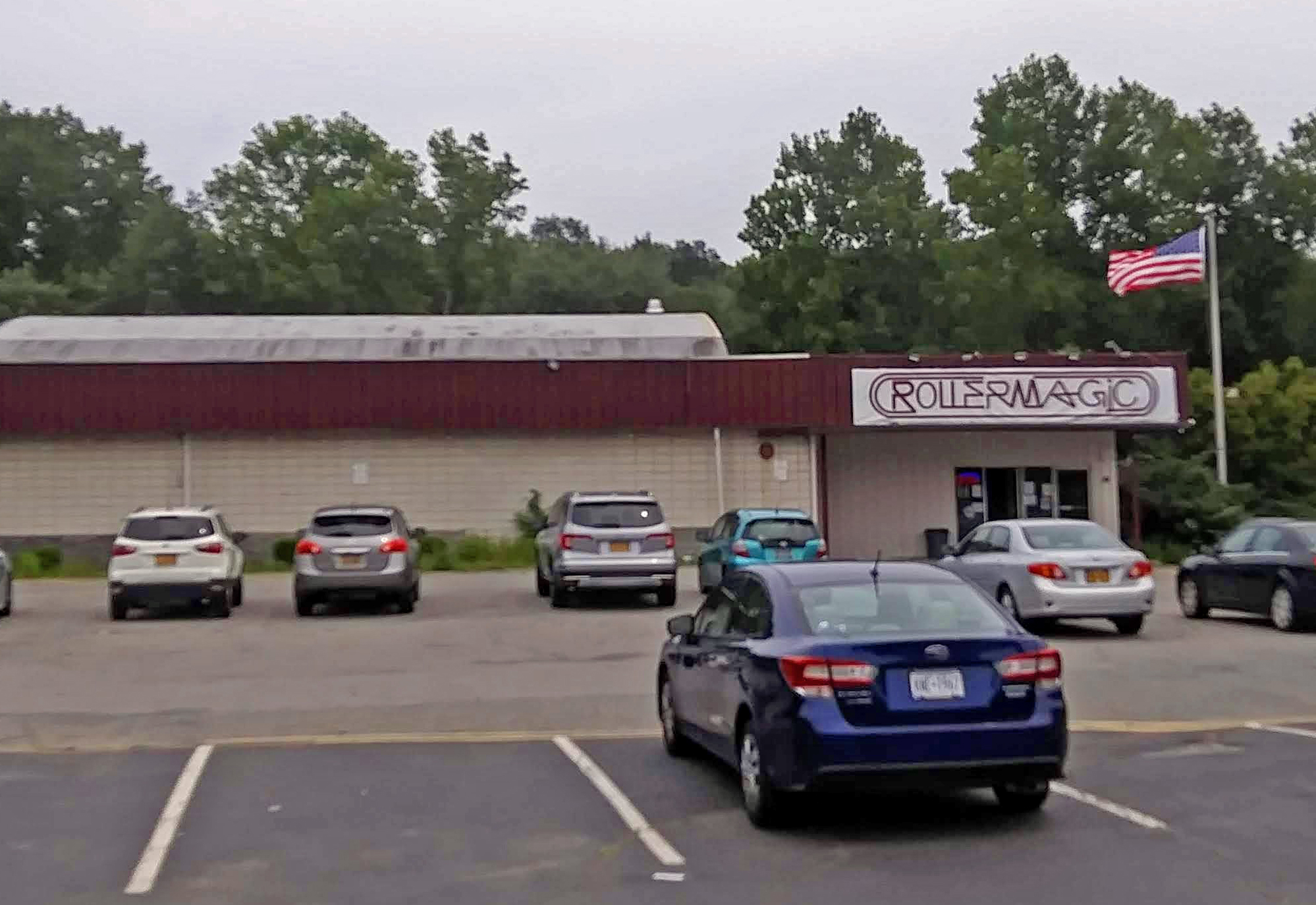
The Rollermagic skating rink used for Cody's birthday party

Principal photography took place during July and August 2018. The production set up offices at Poughkeepsie's Mid-Hudson Civic Center (now the Majed J. Nesheiwat Convention Center) and built some sets for interior scenes there. Elsewhere in Dutchess County, locations used besides the neighborhood with the two houses included a Hyde Park ice cream stand and roller rink where Hannah Bos, one of the writers, had gone skating while a student at Vassar. (Note: Cody's birthday party, the scene set there, was originally supposed to have taken place at a pizza parlor; it was changed when the production used the Poughkeepsie area for filming.) Another scene was filmed at a hardware store in nearby Pleasant Valley.

The production found some other locations across the Hudson River in Ulster County. Del and Cody visit the Rosendale Library in one scene; Del and Rodger go shopping at a small grocery store in that town in another. Some urban street scenes were shot in Kingston and New Paltz. Pirro estimated that the production spent over a million dollars during 10 weeks of shooting.

Ahn had worked with a child actor before when making his debut short Andy, so "I wasn't intimidated by the challenge of doing a feature film with a child actor at the center." He had shown Jaye's parents, but not Jaye himself, the script; Jaye was only shown the scenes he would do 20 or 30 minutes before shooting them. "I just wanted him to stay present and in the moment," Ahn said, adding that Jaye did that very well in every scene. Overall, the director said, "I didn't want [his] performance to feel super-cute, like a Welch's grape juice ad. I wanted it to feel like life."

Jaye and Dennehy worked together for several days before Chau arrived to shoot her scenes. During that time, they developed a rapport that their characters echoed; Ahn recalls that he had to prod Dennehy at some points to be a little more gruff with Jaye. On the day they shot the scene in which Del tells Cody he will be moving to Seattle, after they had finished shooting both actors' closeups and, Ahn thought, the scene, Dennehy asked if they could shoot some more because Jaye's performance had given him some ideas. Ahn was impressed by the older actor's respect for his young costar. "[Dennehy] could have phoned in this performance and I would have been grateful", Ahn said. "But he really tried. He was working hard."

Chau, playing a mother in a film for the first time, developed a similar rapport with Jaye. Ahn recalls how, in the scene where the two eat pizza on the darkened porch of April's house, they kept interacting and eating between takes. "It felt really easy and natural. I was lucky."

Some improvisation was involved in her scenes with Jaye, Chau said. "I think I might have added a couple more fucks than what was in the script" when around him, she recalls. "I think that they were edited out." When she leaned over to Jaye and whispered "Make a wish!" in his ear during the birthday party scene, a line she improvised, Ahn was moved to tears. Her "Professor" nickname for Cody also had not been in the script.

Jaye, too, added some material to the film. After cinematographer Ki Jin Kim noticed that Jaye was stomping Chau's discarded cigarette out on every take of the truck stop scene early in the film, Ahn put a closeup of it in the film to establish the relationship between the characters.

Ahn also added the scene where Chau retreats to a bar to take a break later in the film. "[I]t just feels so real in the situation", he told The Film Stage. "I really love that sequence for that little bit of seeing a woman's independence, a mother's independence." Ahn was also impressed by how well Chau played Big Buck Hunter; he said it made him want to write an action film for her. He and Kim began realizing that Chau did not need much coverage, so they increasingly began shooting her in longer takes.

Chau established her own rapport with Dennehy, whom she believes found the shoot physically challenging due to his age and the summer heat. Since the film's budget was too low for the actors to have individual trailers, Dennehy would relax between his scenes the living room of the house not in use, and talk with the workers at the craft service table, or anyone else there with him. Chau says some of his favorite subjects when she talked with him were his grandchildren, acting and his childhood in New York.

The film had one instance of product placement—the Rocky Rococo pizza delivered to Kathy and Cody for dinner. According to Ahn, the film's first assistant director's family had founded the chain (located exclusively in the Midwest) and she was able to get a T-shirt, hat and pizza box for use in the film. "It was just a fun thing to include," Ahn recalled. Chau recalls the scene fondly since she was hungry and kept eating the pizza between takes; Ahn was concerned that she might get too full to film more takes if needed.

Ahn's own voice can be heard, off-camera, calling out "Bingo!" during the bingo scene at the VFW hall. "I realized when I was watching it in post that I had forgotten to edit it out," he recalled in 2020. That, he said, was about as far as he wanted to go in appearing in his own films.

To make it easier to film in April's house, Ahn said, the film's production designer had the idea to pile all the hoarded items on wheeled tables to allow more options for camera placement and make it easier to roll them in and out of the house. Also, Chau is really cleaning the house in the scenes showing her doing so—at one point he recalled that she told a production assistant a box she was taking out of the house should realistically have more packed in it, and added some things herself. "I really hate to be that actor who says 'Could you make my shoes dirtier?'" said Chau, "but little things like that are important."

Ahn found that directing other people's writing, which he had only done for a TV show previously, improved him as a director. "There's a certain kind of objectivity that you can have with the material when you haven't written it", he observed. When directing his own work, if a scene confused him he would simply rewrite it. But in Bos and Thureen's script, he found himself trying to understand the scene better instead. "I would really investigate the material." Ahn added that he believed the experience made him a better writer. "You begin to see, in a very intense way, what other writers are doing ... When you actually have to direct that other person's screenplay, the lessons that you learn about writing really come across." As a result of the experience, Ahn planned to alternate between directing his own work and others' for the rest of his filmmaking career.

At an online panel discussion hosted by the Brooklyn Academy of Music, Ahn was asked what lessons he learned from making Spa Night that helped in making Driveways. He said that it was how much directing a film is a physically demanding activity, as he was moving around, blocking actors and the camera, and crouching to avoid being on camera, for longer than he had during his first movie, during a very hot and wet summer. Ahn said that he took steps to prepare by getting adequate rest and staying hydrated. He failed to wear adequate shoes, though, and lost sensation in his toes later in the shoot.

== Release ==
The film had its world premiere at the Berlin International Film Festival on February 10, 2019. It also screened at the Tribeca Film Festival on April 30, as one of five films selected for the festival's first Critics' Week. In December, FilmRise acquired distribution rights.

With most theaters closed due to the COVID-19 pandemic, FilmRise released Driveways to video-on-demand services on May 7, 2020.

== Reception ==
=== Critical response ===
On review aggregator website Rotten Tomatoes, the film holds an approval rating of 99% based on 77 reviews, with an average rating of 7.9/10. The site's critic's consensus reads: "Understated yet powerful, Driveways is a character study anchored in fundamental decency—and a poignant farewell to Brian Dennehy." At Metacritic the film has a weighted average score of 83 out of 100, based on 19 critics, indicating "universal acclaim".

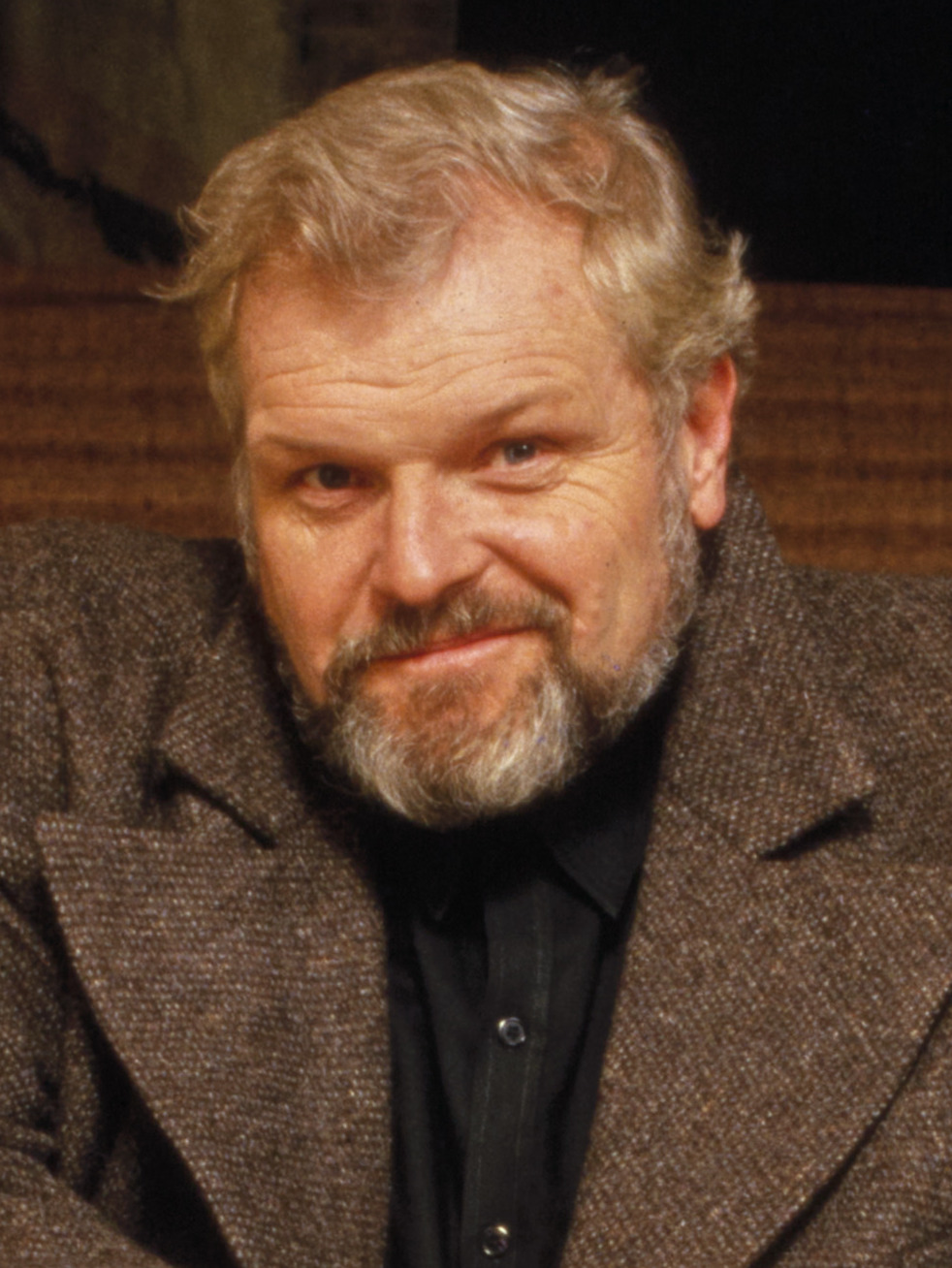
Brian Dennehy's final performance was praised by critics.

The Chicago Tribune's Michael Phillips called it "a small, very quiet, very powerful 83-minute short story of a movie." Dennehy had died a few weeks before, and Phillips took the opportunity to review the actor's stage and screen career, while calling his Driveways performance "marvelous ... I'm so glad Ahn and company managed to give [him] such a big-hearted goldmine to serve as the actor's valediction." Rolling Stone's David Fear concurred; after reviewing Dennehy's career he observed: "What we didn't know was that he had one last great turn in him before he'd be gone, one that would remind you of what an imposing presence and, paradoxically, a gentle giant he could be onscreen."

"See it now," said Fear, who had seen it during its festival runs the year before "and it feels like a salve." Isabel Jones at InStyle also said the pandemic had improved her estimation of the film. Other critics noted how thematically timely it was due to the separations arising from the pandemic and the social distancing measures mandated to control it. "[L]ike just about all pop culture right now, Driveways feels a bit like fantasy. Suddenly I am nostalgic for things I formerly kind of hated, like surprise visits from nosy neighbors or loud roller-skating rinks," wrote Alissa Wilkinson in Vox. She saw the film as anticipating the kind of relationships people might seek out as the pandemic eases, closer to their physical homes. "For me, a film like Driveways is like a firefly caught in a jar, a small light of something like hope that we can learn from one another and love one another, despite whatever storm is raging in the outside world."

Chau and Jaye also earned praise for their performances. "[T]he single mom [Chau] gives you here is a sustained portrait of wariness and weariness," wrote Fear. "[W]e can see her love for her son as well as her believable impatience with some of his quirks", agreed Wilkinson. Jaye, according to Fear, took "one of the least precocious turns from a child actor ever." Variety, reviewing the film at the time of its premiere in Berlin, echoed Ahn's hope for the boy's performance in saying Jaye was "always convincing, never cutesy".

IndieWire's Jude Dry, one of the earliest critics to review the film, was more reserved in his praise for the film. "While restraint is generally a wise approach to storytelling, it runs the risk of leaving a narrative so spare the audience cannot connect", he wrote. A director usually has to trust good actors to add to spare material, but while Ahn's cast was up to that task and he had directed them well, "he and his adorable kid protagonist can't jolt the sleepy narrative out of its familiar comfort zone ... By playing every note sotto voce, Driveways denies its lovingly crafted characters the expressive crescendo they deserve." Dry gave the film a B−.

=== Accolades ===
Award	Year (Note: The listed year refers to the date of the ceremony, not necessarily the year in which the corresponding season or episode aired.)	Category	Nominee(s)	Result	Ref.
Berlin International Film Festival	2019	Teddy Award for Best Feature Film	Andrew Ahn	Nominated	
Berlin International Film Festival	2019	Crystal Bear for The Best Film (Kplus)	Andrew Ahn	Nominated	
Chlotrudis Awards	2020	Best Supporting Actor	Brian Dennehy	Nominated	
Dorian Awards	2021	Best Unsung Film	Driveways	Nominated	
Florida Film Critics Circle	2020	Best Supporting Actor	Brian Dennehy	Runner-up	
Florida Film Critics Circle	2020	Breakout Award	Lucas Jaye	Nominated	
Gimli Film Festival	2020	Best of Fest Audience Choice Award	Andrew Ahn	Won	
Greater Western New York Film Critics Association	2020	Best Picture	Driveways	Nominated	
Greater Western New York Film Critics Association	2020	Best Supporting Actor	Brian Dennehy	Nominated	
Greater Western New York Film Critics Association	2020	Best Original Screenplay	Hannah Bos & Paul Thureen	Nominated	
Independent Spirit Awards	2020	Best Female Lead	Hong Chau	Nominated	
Independent Spirit Awards	2020	Best First Screenplay	Hannah Bos & Paul Thureen	Nominated	
National Board of Review	2021	Top Ten Independent Films	Driveways	Won	
Remi Awards	2020	Best Rising Star - Male	Lucas Jaye	Won	
Remi Awards	2020	Features - Dramatic / Original	Andrew Ahn	Won	
Remi Awards	2020	Lifetime Achievement Award	Brian Dennehy	Won	
San Diego Asian Film Festival	2019	Best Narrative Feature	Andrew Ahn	Won	
San Diego Film Critics Society	2021	Best Actor	Brian Dennehy	Nominated	
Satellite Awards	2021	Best Supporting Actor	Brian Dennehy	Nominated	
Seattle International Film Festival	2019	New American Cinema Competition	Andrew Ahn	Nominated	

== See also ==
- List of LGBT-related films of 2019
- List of American films of 2019
