= Aaron Jackson (comedian) =

American actor, comedian, and writer

Aaron Jackson is an American actor, comedian, and writer. He is best known for co-writing and starring in Dicks: The Musical.

== Career ==
Jackson co-wrote and starred in the Upright Citizens Brigade stage show "Fucking Identical Twins" with Josh Sharp. The show later received a film adaptation titled Dicks: The Musical, directed by Larry Charles. The film also starred and was co-written by Jackson and Sharp. The film premiered at the 2023 Toronto International Film Festival, winning the People's Choice Award for Midnight Madness.

== Filmography ==
=== Film ===
Year	Title	Role	Notes
2023	Dicks: The Musical	Trevor	Also writer

=== Television ===
Year	Title	Role	Notes
2016	Broad City	Partygoer	Episode: "Rat Pack"
2024	Fantasmas	Coco	Voice, episode: "Toilets"
2026	Kevin	Clem	Voice, episode: "Provincetown"

=== Theater ===
Year	Title	Role	Notes
2015	Fucking Identical Twins: A Musical	Trevor	Also writer
2025	Messy White Gays	Caden	Off-Broadway

=== Podcast ===
Year	Title	Role	Notes
2019-2020	The National Lampoon Radio Hour	Various	10 episodes; also writer
