= The Wedding Banquet (2025 film) =

Film by Andrew Ahn

- Theatrical release poster
- Directed by: Andrew Ahn
- Screenplay by: Andrew Ahn; James Schamus
- Based on: The Wedding Banquet by: Ang Lee; Neil Peng; James Schamus
- Produced by: Anita Gou; Joe Pirro; Caroline Clark; James Schamus
- Starring: Bowen Yang; Lily Gladstone; Kelly Marie Tran; Han Gi-chan; Joan Chen; Youn Yuh-jung
- Cinematography: Ki Jin Kim
- Edited by: Geraud Brisson
- Music by: Jay Wadley
- Production companies: ShivHans Pictures; Kindred Spirit; Symbolic Exchange
- Distributed by: Bleecker Street (United States and Canada); Universal Pictures (International)
- Release dates: January 27, 2025 (Sundance); April 18, 2025 (United States)
- Running time: 103 minutes
- Country: United States
- Languages: English; Chinese; Korean
- Box office: $2.5 million

The Wedding Banquet is a 2025 American romantic comedy film directed by Andrew Ahn, and co-written by Ahn and James Schamus. A remake of the 1993 film, the film stars Bowen Yang, Lily Gladstone, Kelly Marie Tran, Han Gi-chan, Joan Chen, and Youn Yuh-jung.

The Wedding Banquet premiered at the 2025 Sundance Film Festival, followed by a theatrical release in the United States on April 18, 2025. It received positive reviews.

== Plot ==
Angela Chen lives with her partner Lee in Lee's family home in Seattle, where Angela's mother May has become an award-winning member of the local PFLAG chapter. Chris, Angela's best friend since a one-time fling in college, lives in Lee's garage with his longtime boyfriend Min, a Korean student artist whose visa will soon expire. Min receives a call from his wealthy grandmother Ja-Young, who declares that the time has come for him to join the family business and return home.

Lee is ready to become a mother, but her second round of IVF is unsuccessful, leaving her unsure if she and Angela can afford a third and final attempt. She suggests Angela carry their child instead, leading to an argument about Angela's strained relationship with her own mother. They find their friends fighting as well after Min asks Chris to marry him, but Chris is unwilling to let Min, who has not come out to his family, be disowned and financially cut off by his homophobic grandfather.

While Angela and Chris commiserate, Min and Lee hatch a plan: Min proposes to Angela instead, allowing him to appease his family and remain in the US, in exchange for his paying for Lee's fertility treatment. Determined to help Lee, Angela agrees to "marry" Min. He informs his grandmother, while Angela finally confronts May for her performative allyship after they were estranged for years. At her bachelorette party, Angela is less sure about having a child and Chris is still unwilling to marry Min, leading Lee and Min to storm off. Angela and Chris drunkenly sleep together, realizing their mistake in the morning.

Ja-Young arrives unexpectedly, forcing Angela, Lee, and Chris to hastily hide all lesbian paraphernalia in the house. Min introduces Angela as his fiancée, but his grandmother deduces the truth and the four friends reveal everything. To protect Min's access to the family's money and prevent gossip, Ja-Young agrees not to force him to join the company in exchange for staging a grand wedding for his grandfather's benefit. Lee continues IVF as Ja-Young makes elaborate preparations, with Chris as best man and May as the eager mother-of-the-bride. The night before the wedding, Ja-Young and Chris share an honest conversation about his relationship with his own family, and Min sews his grandmother a handmade hanbok.

Angela and Min complete a traditional Korean wedding ceremony, with Ja-Young's employees filling in as guests. After vomiting on her new husband, Angela confirms she is pregnant after her drunken night with Chris. She is comforted by her mother, but the revelation drives the four friends apart as a heartbroken Lee leaves, and Chris breaks up with Min, unwilling to further complicate Min's life. The wedding is publicized in Korea as planned, but Ja-Young admits that she herself married someone she did not love, and is moved by Min's art and the life he has made for himself with his chosen family.

Angela decides to keep the baby, and Chris's cousin Kendall reassures him that he is more than capable of being a parent. Finalizing their marriage license at the courthouse, the newlyweds are interrupted by Chris as he and Min joyfully agree to marry each other instead, with Ja-Young's blessing. Returning home, Angela finds Lee and they wordlessly reconcile. Sometime later, the house is now home to two babies, as Lee and Angela have each given birth and are still living with Chris and Min, all raising their family together.

== Cast ==
- Bowen Yang as Chris
- Lily Gladstone as Lee
- Kelly Marie Tran as Angela Chen
- Han Gi-chan as Min
- Joan Chen as May Chen
- Youn Yuh-jung as Ja-Young
- Bobo Le as Kendall

== Production ==
In April 2024, it was reported that a remake of the 1993 film The Wedding Banquet was in development, with Andrew Ahn directing and co-writing the screenplay with James Schamus, who co-wrote the original film. Lily Gladstone, Kelly Marie Tran, Bowen Yang, Joan Chen, and Youn Yuh-jung were cast in the lead roles.

=== Filming ===
Principal photography began on May 27, 2024, in Vancouver, Canada, and concluded on June 28.

== Release ==
The Wedding Banquet premiered at the 2025 Sundance Film Festival, followed by a theatrical release in the United States on April 18, 2025.

It was also presented in the World Cinema section at the 30th Busan International Film Festival in September 2025.

== Reception ==
On the review aggregator website Rotten Tomatoes, 86% of 170 critics' reviews are positive, with an average rating of 7.2/10. The website's consensus reads: "Andrew Ahn lends a tender eye to a humorous and heartfelt remake that boasts loving performances to be embraced by all." Metacritic, which uses a weighted average, assigned the film a score of 68 out of 100, based on 31 critics, indicating "generally favorable" reviews.

Carlos Aguilar of Variety calls The Wedding Banquet a "thoroughly enjoyable and winningly sincere" film, noting its shift from the original's societal pressures to the interpersonal dynamics of two LGBT couples. He praises Kelly Marie Tran and Bowen Yang for their compelling performances, with standout work from Youn Yuh-jung. Aguilar also highlights the film's humor, which derives from cultural clash and generational tension. While acknowledging the film could have pushed further into daring territory, he finds it accessible and engaging for a wide audience.

Bilge Ebiri of Vulture describes The Wedding Banquet as a rom-com that skillfully combines farce and emotional depth, capturing the charm of the original while adapting it for modern sensibilities. Ebiri praises the film's brisk comedy, which keeps the narrative fun despite its predictability, while noting that its sincere, quieter moments, particularly in the interactions with the older characters, add emotional weight. Though the mix of humor and sincerity can be jarring at times, Ebiri finds the film's chaotic energy ultimately winning, making it a “messy” but enjoyable experience.

Jesse Hassenger of The Guardian critiques The Wedding Banquet, noting its struggle to balance comedy with serious themes. While the film acknowledges progress since the 1993 original, it often hesitates to fully embrace humor, opting instead for a more somber, drama-focused tone. The plot, revolving around a green card marriage proposal, is bogged down by relationship issues and lacks the sharp comedic edge of its predecessor. Hassenger praises the performances, especially those of Lily Gladstone and Kelly Marie Tran, but feels the film gets lost in its mix of drama and farce, ultimately feeling awkward and unsure of its tone. While the film offers some heartfelt moments, it struggles to commit to either comedy or drama, leaving it feeling muddled.

Dieter Oßwald of German arthouse website Programmkino.de writes: "The remake hardly achieves the refreshing lightness and credible emotionality. Nevertheless, it is an important film in populist times. Not niche cinema, but mainstream, celebrating diversity and marriage for all. Make America queer again."

=== Accolades ===
Award	Date of ceremony	Category	Result	Ref.
The Queerties	March 11, 2025	Next Big Thing	Nominated	
Pride Awards	June 29, 2025	Best Picture	Nominated	
