= Danielle Perez =

American stand-up comedian, actor, and writer

- Born: Danielle Perez; 1984 or 1985 (age 41–42)

Danielle Perez (born 1984 or 1985) is an American stand-up comedian, actor, and writer. She participated in CBS's 2020 Diversity Sketch Comedy Showcase and has credits on ABC's Jimmy Kimmel Live!, MTV's Decoded, NBC's StandUp, and A Little Late with Lilly Singh.

== Early life ==
Perez grew up in Los Angeles, California. She attended San Francisco State University. As a child, she struggled with eating disorders and depression. She is Afro-Dominican.

== Career ==
Perez appeared on the game show The Price Is Right in 2015 where she won a treadmill despite being in a wheelchair. Perez found humor in this ironic moment. She appeared on Jimmy Kimmel Live! soon after, and Kimmel gave her a trip on a Royal Caribbean Cruise.

Perez has performed comedy at a number of festivals and venues, including SF Sketchfest, Laughing Skull Comedy Festival, and the Brooklyn Comedy Festival. She has opened for many popular comedians, including Maria Bamford, Laurie Kilmartin, and Guy Branum. She participated in CBS's Diversity Sketch Comedy Showcase in 2020 in Los Angeles, a showcase designed to spotlight historically underrepresented voices in comedy. She has credits on season 11 of Curb Your Enthusiasm, MTV's Decoded, NBC's StandUp, and A Little Late with Lilly Singh. She has also filmed sketches for BuzzFeed and voiced characters for Comedy Central.

Perez advocates for accessibility and inclusivity in comedy.

She founded Thigh Gap Comedy with fellow comics Madison Shepard and Danielle Radford. They put on live comedy shows around Los Angeles, including one called GENTRIFICATION in the Highland Park neighborhood.

In 2022, it was announced that Perez would star in the comedy film Plan B, alongside Jon Heder, Tom Berenger, and Shannon Elizabeth. Perez voiced Charlotte Webber / Sun-Spider in Spider-Man: Across the Spider-Verse.

== Personal life ==
When Perez was 20 years old, she was hit by a trolley in San Francisco while crossing the street. Her lower legs were amputated and she began using a wheelchair. She is openly queer. She has canvassed for the Democratic Socialists of America.

== Filmography ==
=== Film ===
Year	Title	Role	Notes
2021	Take Back the Night	The Grilled Cheese Maker	
2021	Just Swipe	Donna	
2023	Spider-Man: Across the Spider-Verse	Charlotte Webber / Sun-Spider	Voice
2023	Dicks: The Musical	Danielle the Stooper	
TBA	Plan B	Dr. Britt Chapman	

=== Television ===
Year	Title	Role	Notes
2018	Quinta vs. Everything	Lady in Wheelchair	Episode: "Quinta vs. Humanity"
2018	Fagabonds	Danielle	Episode #1.5
2021	Special	Kit	2 episodes
2021	Diary of a Future President	Tina	Episode: "Quid Pro Quo"
2021	Curb Your Enthusiasm	Network Exec #2	2 episodes
2022	Russian Doll	Librarian	Episode: "Brain Drain"
2023	With Love	Zari	Episode: "Lily's Double Quinceañera"
2023	Hamster & Gretel	Additional voices	2 episodes
2025	The Night Agent	Celeste Vega	2 episodes
