= Andrew Ahn =

American film director

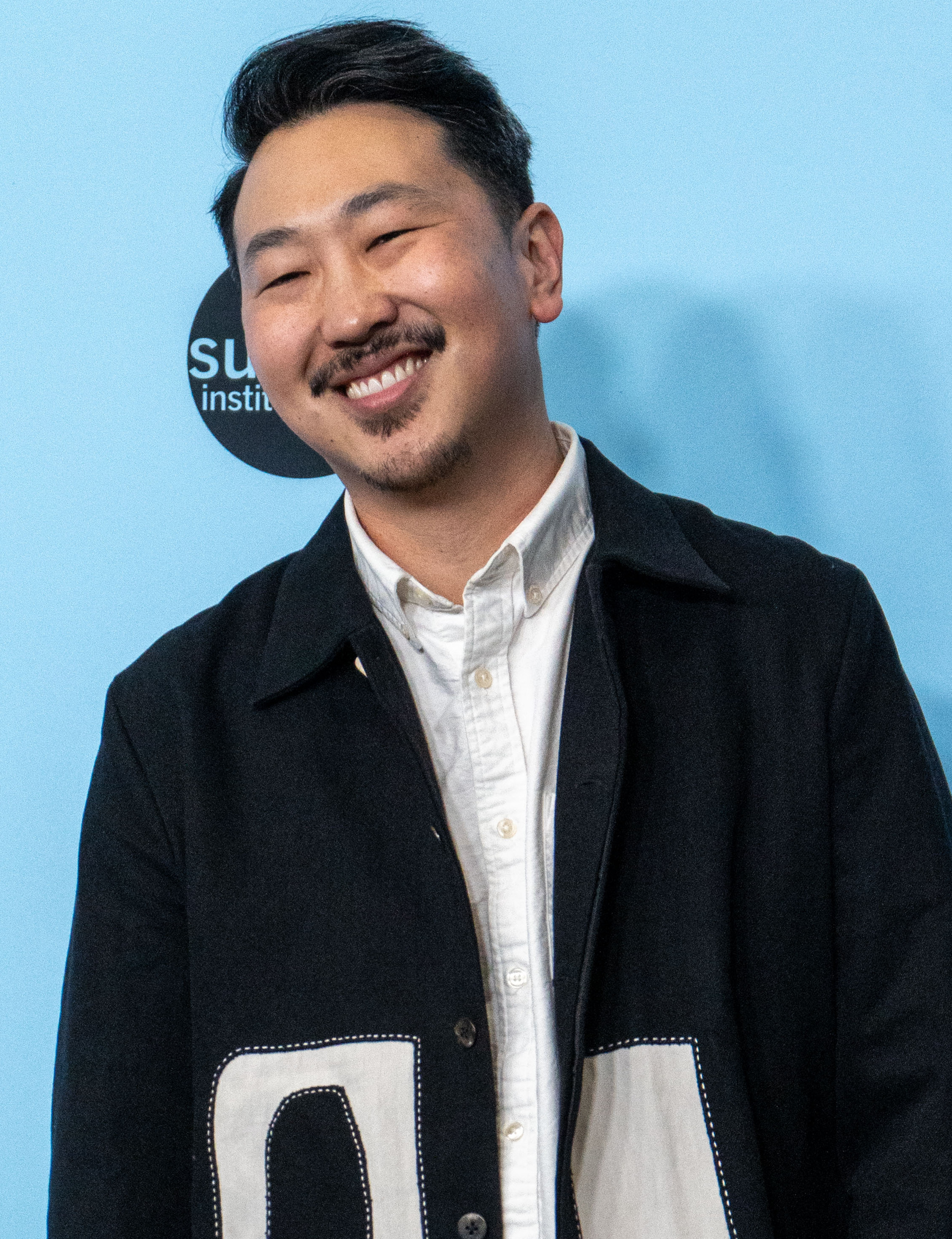
- Ahn in 2025
- Born: March 10, 1986 (age 40); Los Angeles, California, U.S.
- Education: Brown University (BA); California Institute of the Arts (MFA)
- Occupations: Film director; screenwriter
- Years active: 2011–present
- Website: andrewahnfilms.com

Andrew Ahn (born March 10, 1986) is an American film director and screenwriter who has directed the feature films Spa Night (2016), Driveways (2019), Fire Island (2022), and The Wedding Banquet (2025).

== Early life ==
Andrew Ahn was born and raised in Los Angeles. He is the son of Korean immigrants. He graduated from Brown University with a degree in English and received a master's degree in fine arts (MFA) in Film Directing from the California Institute of the Arts (CalArts).

== Career ==
In 2011, Ahn wrote, directed, edited and produced a short film entitled Andy, which won the Best Narrative Short award at the 2011 San Diego Asian Film Festival. The film has also screened at film festivals including the Boston Asian American Film Festival, the Slamdance Film Festival, the San Francisco International Asian American Film Festival, the Los Angeles Asian Pacific Film Festival, Outfest, the Hong Kong Lesbian and Gay Film Festival, the DisOrient Asian American Film Festival of Oregon and the Vancouver Asian Film Festival.

In 2012, Ahn wrote, directed, edited and produced a short film entitled Dol (First Birthday), which premiered at the 2012 Sundance Film Festival. It won awards including the Grand Jury Award Outstanding Narrative Short Film at Outfest: Los Angeles Gay and Lesbian Film Festival 2012, and a Jury Award for Best Narrative Short Film at the Polari: Austin Gay and Lesbian International Film Festival 2012. Ahn has stated that he made the film to come out to his parents as gay.

Ahn has also served as an editor on the documentary I Am Divine (2013) (directed by Jeffrey Schwarz) and was a post-production assistant on the documentaries Vito (2011) and Tab Hunter Confidential (2015), both of which were also directed by Jeffrey Schwarz. He went on to direct two episodes of the third season of the hit Netflix series Bridgerton.

Ahn raised funds via Kickstarter for his feature film, entitled Spa Night, about a closeted gay Korean-American teenager who follows his desires and finds more than he bargains for at the Korean spa in the Koreatown of Los Angeles. He developed the screenplay for the film at the 2013 Sundance Screenwriters Lab, which it was selected for, and participated in the Film Independent Screenwriting Lab and the Film Independent Directing Lab with the feature screenplay for the project. For developing the film, he also received a Sundance Institute Cinereach Feature Film Fellow grant.

== Filmography ==
Short film

Year	Title	Director	Writer	Producer
2010	Andy	Yes	Yes	Yes
2011	Dol (First Birthday)	Yes	Yes	Yes
2019	30/30 Vision: 3 Decades of Strand Releasing (segment "Going Out to Sea")	Yes	Yes	No

Feature film

Year	Title	Director	Writer
2016	Spa Night	Yes	Yes
2019	Driveways	Yes	No
2022	Fire Island	Yes	No
2025	The Wedding Banquet	Yes	Yes

Television

Year	Title	Director	Executive producer
2017	Lost L.A.	Yes (1)	No
2018–19	This Close	Yes (7)	Yes
2020	Gentefied	Yes (2)	No
2021	MacGyver	Yes (1)	No
2021	Pride	Yes (1)	No
2021	Generation	Yes (2)	No
2024	Bridgerton	Yes (2)	No
2025	Deli Boys	Yes (1)	No
2026	Sterling Point	Yes (2)	No

== Accolades ==
Organizations	Year (Note: Indicates the year of ceremony. Each year is linked to the article about the awards held that year, wherever possible.)	Category	Work	Result	Ref.
AGLIFF Awards	2012	Jury Award for Best Narrative Short	Dol (First Birthday)	Won	
Berlin International Film Festival	2019	Teddy Award for Best Feature Film	Driveways	Nominated	
Berlin International Film Festival	2019	Crystal Bear for The Best Film (Kplus)	Driveways	Nominated	
Boston LGBT Film Festival	2016	Jury Prize for Best Narrative Feature	Spa Night	Won	
Gimli Film Festival	2020	Best of Fest Audience Choice Award	Driveways	Won	
Independent Spirit Awards	2017	John Cassavetes Award	Spa Night	Won	
Independent Spirit Awards	2017	Someone to Watch Award	Spa Night	Nominated	
Inside Out Toronto LGBT Film Festival	2016	Best First Feature	Spa Night	Won	
Nashville Film Festival	2016	New Directors Competition	Spa Night	Nominated	
Outfest Los Angeles Film Festival	2012	Jury Award Outstanding Narrative Short Film	Dol (First Birthday)	Won	
Philadelphia Film Festival	2016	Best First Feature	Spa Night	Nominated	
Remi Awards	2020	Features - Dramatic / Original	Driveways	Won	
San Diego Asian Film Festival	2011	Best Narrative Short	Andy	Won	
San Diego Asian Film Festival	2016	George C. Lin Emerging Filmmaker Award	Spa Night	Won	
San Diego Asian Film Festival	2019	Best Narrative Feature	Driveways	Won	
Seattle International Film Festival	2019	New American Cinema Competition	Driveways	Nominated	
Sundance Film Festival	2012	Grand Jury Prize Short Films	Dol (First Birthday)	Nominated	
Sundance Film Festival	2016	Grand Jury Prize Dramatic	Spa Night	Nominated	
