= Joe Seo =

American actor

- Born: Joseph Lee Seo; July 31, 1980 (age 46); San Francisco
- Education: Crescenta Valley High School University of California, Los Angeles
- Occupation: Actor
- Notable credit: Kyler Park in Cobra Kai

Joseph Lee Seo is an American actor, known for his role as Kyler Park in the Netflix comedy-drama television series Cobra Kai.

== Personal life and early career ==
Seo was born in San Francisco, California on July 31, 1980. He began his acting career in the mid-2000s, gaining recognition for roles in Gridiron Gang (2006) and Freedom Writers (2007), both of which showcased him early on.

In 2016, Seo starred in the dramatic film Spa Night as the son in a conservative Korean family who begins to question his sexuality, for which his performance was reviewed in The Hollywood Reporter as "physically imposing yet intentionally somewhat opaque". At the Sundance Film Festival, Seo won the Special Jury Award for Breakthrough Performance. Seo appeared in the Netflix television series Cobra Kai as Kyler Park.

== Selected filmography ==
=== Television ===
| Year | Title | Role | Notes | Refs |
|---|---|---|---|---|
| 2017 | Hawaii Five-0 | Viktor | Episode: "Kau pahi, Ko'u kua. Kau pu, ko'h po'o" | |
| 2018 | The Vampyr Resistance Corps | Tikaani | 6 episodes | |
| 2018–2024 | Cobra Kai | Kyler Park | Recurring role (seasons 1, 3–6) | |

=== Film ===
| Year | Title | Role | Notes | Refs |
|---|---|---|---|---|
| 2006 | Gridiron Gang | Choi | | |
| 2007 | Freedom Writers | Sindy's gang member | Uncredited role | |
| 2011 | Out of the Shadows | Jin | short film | |
| 2016 | Spa Night | David Cho | | |
| 2016 | Message from the King | Sam | | |
| 2017 | The Bird Who Could Fly | Arthur | short film | |
| 2025 | The Cobra Kai Movie Part II | Himself | short film | |

== Awards ==
| Date | Award | Category | Work | Result | Ref. |
|---|---|---|---|---|---|
| January 21–31, 2016 | Sundance Film Festival | Special Jury Award for Breakthrough Performance | Spa Night | Won | |
| July 7–17, 2016 | L.A. Outfest | Grand Jury Award for Outstanding Performance | Spa Night | Won | |
