= Dicks: The Musical =

2023 film by Larry Charles

- Theatrical release poster
- Directed by: Larry Charles
- Screenplay by: Aaron Jackson; Josh Sharp
- Based on: Fucking Identical Twins by: Josh Sharp; Aaron Jackson
- Produced by: Peter Chernin; Jenno Topping; Kori Adelson; Larry Charles
- Starring: Megan Mullally; Megan Thee Stallion; Bowen Yang; Nathan Lane; Aaron Jackson; Josh Sharp
- Cinematography: Michelle Lawler; Charlie Sarroff
- Edited by: Al LeVine
- Music by: Marius de Vries; Karl Saint Lucy
- Production companies: A24; Chernin Entertainment
- Distributed by: A24
- Release dates: September 7, 2023 (TIFF); October 6, 2023 (United States)
- Running time: 86 minutes
- Country: United States
- Language: English
- Budget: $8 million
- Box office: $1.5 million

Dicks: The Musical is a 2023 American musical comedy film directed by Larry Charles, based on the off-Broadway musical Fucking Identical Twins by Josh Sharp and Aaron Jackson, who helped adapt the film. The film stars Megan Mullally, Megan Thee Stallion, Bowen Yang, Nathan Lane, Aaron Jackson, and Josh Sharp, with Tom Kenny and Frank Todaro appearing in supporting roles as the Sewer Boys. It tells the story of a pair of identical twins who plot to reunite their divorced parents as narrated by God.

The film had its world premiere at the 2023 Toronto International Film Festival on September 7, 2023. On October 6, 2023, it was released in the United States by A24 as the studio's first musical film.

== Plot ==
God narrates the tale of Craig and Trevor, two straight, womanizing, misogynistic business salesmen who are, unbeknownst to them, identical twins separated at birth by their parents. When their companies undergo a merger, they finally meet. Initially competitive with one another, they realize that they are brothers when they notice each other's matching necklace pendants and learn each other's birthdays.

In each other, they finally find a kindred spirit, but dissatisfied with their experiences growing up, they hatch a plan to get their parents back together to become a "real family". They each disguise themselves as one another and visit their other parent: Craig visits Evelyn, their shut-in and eccentric mother whose vagina had fallen off and died, and Trevor visits Harrison, their newly out gay father who keeps two humanoid genetic mutants called "sewer boys" in a cage in his home. Both parents discuss their respective issues to their sons, to the boys' horror.

Disgusted, but adamant to complete their plan, the boys trick Evelyn and Harrison into having dinner together, who both accept due to their deep loneliness. Craig and Trevor's schemes cause them to miss work, and after insulting their boss, Gloria, she fires them. At the restaurant, Evelyn and Harrison realize that their sons have met and what they are trying to do. Nevertheless, they have sex in the restaurant, to the boys' delight, but leave them crushed when they tell them they have no intention of getting married again.

The failure causes a rift between the two boys and they fall into a depression to the point that Evelyn and Harrison kidnap them both to Harrison's home to try to cheer them up. However, the Sewer Boys get loose and flee back to the sewers. Harrison chases after them down the sewer, and Evelyn realizes that she wants more out of life and jumps in after him, as do the boys. Searching together, they all realize that they are a true family. Seeing the Sewer Boys about to be exterminated by a sewage worker, Evelyn reveals that she saved her dead vagina and nursed it back to health in her hand bag, throwing it at the worker and saving the Sewer Boys. Harrison realizes that he must let the Sewer Boys go in order to spend time with his true family.

Some time later, the family all move in together into an apartment, where Craig and Trevor share a room and bed and discover their intense sexual attraction to each other. They later get married in a ceremony officiated by God which is interrupted by protestors and religious conservatives, decrying the union of two gay identical twins. God sternly lectures the protestors for their hatefulness and declares that Craig and Trevor's union will be added into the newest edition of his bestseller, the Bible. They all celebrate the union and the revelation that God is gay.

== Cast ==
- Josh Sharp as Craig, a businessman
- Aaron Jackson as Trevor, a businessman who is Craig's long-lost twin brother
- Nathan Lane as Harrison, the outed gay father of Craig and Trevor who raised the "Sewer Boys"
- Megan Mullally as Evelyn, the mother of Craig and Trevor and ex-wife of Harrison who no longer has a vagina
- Bowen Yang as God, the narrator of this film.
- Megan Thee Stallion as Gloria, the boss of Craig and Trevor
- Sonya Eddy as Sonya, an old lady
- Danielle Perez as Danielle, a Stooper
- Nick Offerman as Steve Chaney
- D'Arcy Carden as a neighbor

=== Voices ===
- Tom Kenny as Backpack, one of Harrison's Sewer Boys
- Frank Todaro as Whisper, one of Harrison's Sewer Boys

== Production ==
=== Development ===
In June 2016, 20th Century Fox was set to produce a film adaptation of Josh Sharp and Aaron Jackson's two-man musical Fucking Identical Twins with Sharp and Jackson writing the script and Peter Chernin's production company for Fox. In February 2022, A24 acquired the film after Fox merged with Disney, with Chernin Entertainment still attached to produce and co-finance the film, and Larry Charles was set to direct. The creators took inspiration from the works of John Waters, Christopher Guest’s Waiting for Guffman (1996), The Rocky Horror Picture Show (1975), and Strangers With Candy (1999–2000).

=== Casting ===
On February 17, 2022, Sharp and Jackson were set to reprise their roles and Megan Thee Stallion, Nathan Lane, Megan Mullally, and Bowen Yang joined the cast.

== Music ==
Dicks: The Musical (The Album)

Soundtrack album by Marius de Vries, Karl Saint Lucy, Josh Sharp, Aaron Jackson and cast
- Released: October 6, 2023
- Genres: Film soundtrack; musical theatre
- Length: 68:28
- Label: A24 Music
- Producers: Marius de Vries; Fiora Cutler

Singles from Dicks: The Musical (The Album)
- 1. "All Love Is Love" Released: September 11, 2023; 2. "Gay Old Life" Released: September 22, 2023; 3. "Out Alpha the Alpha" Released: October 4, 2023

In February 2022, Sharp, Jackson and Karl Saint Lucy wrote new songs for the film. Marius de Vries and Fiora Cutler were the film’s music producer and music supervisor, respectively. Most of the vocal performances for the musical numbers were recorded live on set instead of the traditional method of lip-syncing to pre-recorded tracks.

In an interview with Variety, De Vries felt that he had a responsibility to pay attention to the detailed work within the songwriting and the arrangements because "the overall mission of the show is so anarchic and uprooted… and demented". He was not parodying songs, but rather trying to "elicit humor by referencing other particular, specific songs". "The Sewer Song" is a quodlibet, combining several different melodies in counterpoint, such as "Johanna" from Sweeney Todd: The Demon Barber of Fleet Street and "One Day More" from Les Misérables.

With the inclusion of the songs as well as the musical score, the soundtrack had an almost longer duration as the film, which was considered to be a bigger job, where they had to conduct jazz sessions to underscore the film. Some of the songs were performed in a large canvas, similar to a Broadway musical performance where they had to negotiate with the company in advance for paying symphonic arrangements. They kept the songs "fairly embryonic" even through the shoot as lot of vocals were shot and recorded live, most of the songs were existed as piano vocals until they hit the notes. Each song had to be expanded into an orchestral treatment — either symphonic or jazz — whenever needed, and they were almost fully orchestrated with the help of a computer.

The original song "Out Alpha the Alpha" was performed by Megan Thee Stallion, initially conceived as a cabaret number but later changed to a rap number. Although they had been written as a virtuoso number, the song "had to be torn to pieces and then reconceived in a very fundamental way extremely quickly" following her casting and due to their short duration for rehearsal and filming. De Vries and Lucy felt the music is not self-consciously funny but was a calibration of the music being supportive of the action, and furthermore the pacing was felt like the need for more stuff underpinning the sequences of events rather than the internal emotional state of the characters, which was a bit esoteric. The duo wrote the score three times, where they got right at the final element. Matt Robertson worked as an additional music composer.

=== Track listing ===
No.	Title	Artist(s)	Length
1.	"Overture"	Marius de Vries; Karl Saint Lucy	2:07
2.	"I'll Always Be on Top"	Josh Sharp; Aaron Jackson	4:02
3.	"No One Understands"	Sharp; Jackson	4:49
4.	"Tea with Mommy"	de Vries; Lucy	3:15
5.	"Evelyn Song"	Megan Mullally	2:38
6.	"Mimosas with Daddy"	de Vries; Lucy	1:30
7.	"Gay Old Life"	Nathan Lane; Mullaly	3:52
8.	"You Can't Give Up"	Sharp; Jackson	3:02
9.	"An Invitation"	de Vries; Lucy	2:36
10.	"Lonely"	Mullally; Lane	4:39
11.	"Vroomba!"	Lucy; de Vries	0:10
12.	"Out Alpha the Alpha"	Megan Thee Stallion	3:55
13.	"La Chateau"	de Vries; Lucy	4:20
14.	"Desperate for Your Love"	Mullally; Lane	2:26
15.	"This Is Stupid" (Suite)	de Vries; Lucy	4:12
16.	"No One Understands" (Reprise)	Sharp; Jackson	0:53
17.	"Why Won't You Work?"	de Vries; Lucy	0:53
18.	"Kidnap!" (Suite)	de Vries; Lucy	2:14
19.	"Evelyn Song" (Reprise)	Mullally	0:51
20.	"The Sewer Song"	Lane; Sharp; Jackson; Mullaly	1:59
21.	"Animal Control"	de Vries; Lucy	3:06
22.	"Nessuno Mi Ha Capita"	Ashley Faatoalia; Abdiel Gonzalez	2:06
23.	"Love in All Its Forms"	de Vries; Bowen Yang	1:54
24.	"All Love Is Love"	Mullally; Lane; Sharp; Jackson; Yang; Lauren Evans	3:58
25.	"Afterturn"	de Vries; Lucy	3:01
Total length:			68:28

== Release ==
It had its world premiere at the 2023 Toronto International Film Festival on September 7, 2023, where it won the People's Choice Award for Midnight Madness. It was released in the United States by A24 on October 6, 2023. It was previously scheduled to be released on September 29, 2023.

The soundtrack was announced on September 11, 2023, consisting a combination of 25 tracks: both the songs and the incidental underscore, set for release on October 6, the same day as the film. Alongside the album announcement, the song "All Love Is Love" was unveiled as a single through digital platforms. Nathan Lane's single "Gay Old Life" was released on September 22, while Megan Thee Stallion's song "Out Alpha the Alpha" released on October 4, and its music video unveiled the following day.

Dicks: The Musical was released for digital platforms on November 10, 2023.

=== Critical response ===
On the review aggregator website Rotten Tomatoes, 68% of 108 critics' reviews are positive, with an average rating of 6.0/10. The website's consensus reads: "From its eyebrow-raising title to its gleefully provocative humor, talented cast, and catchy songs, Dicks: The Musical is a cult movie in the making." Metacritic, which uses a weighted average, assigned the film a score of 57 out of 100, based on 29 critics, indicating "mixed or average" reviews.

Richard Lawson of Vanity Fair praised the songs as "legitimate toe-tappers". Elisabeth Vincentelli of The New York Times called the music "passable" and the staging "mostly anemic". Ross Bonaime of Collider felt that "the tone of these songs gets old unfortunately too soon, especially as the first few musical numbers rely solely on them". David Fear of Rolling Stone wrote that the "outrageous, cabaret-style camp more than Broadway-style song-and-dance numbers" were one of the film's highlights. David Ehrlich of IndieWire wrote the songs being "credible Broadway riffs" that "keep things moving along even when their staging falls short". Johnny Oleksinski of New York Post wrote "The songs, catchy while not trying to break ground, are send-ups of traditional Broadway show tunes."
