= Jay Wadley =

American composer and music producer

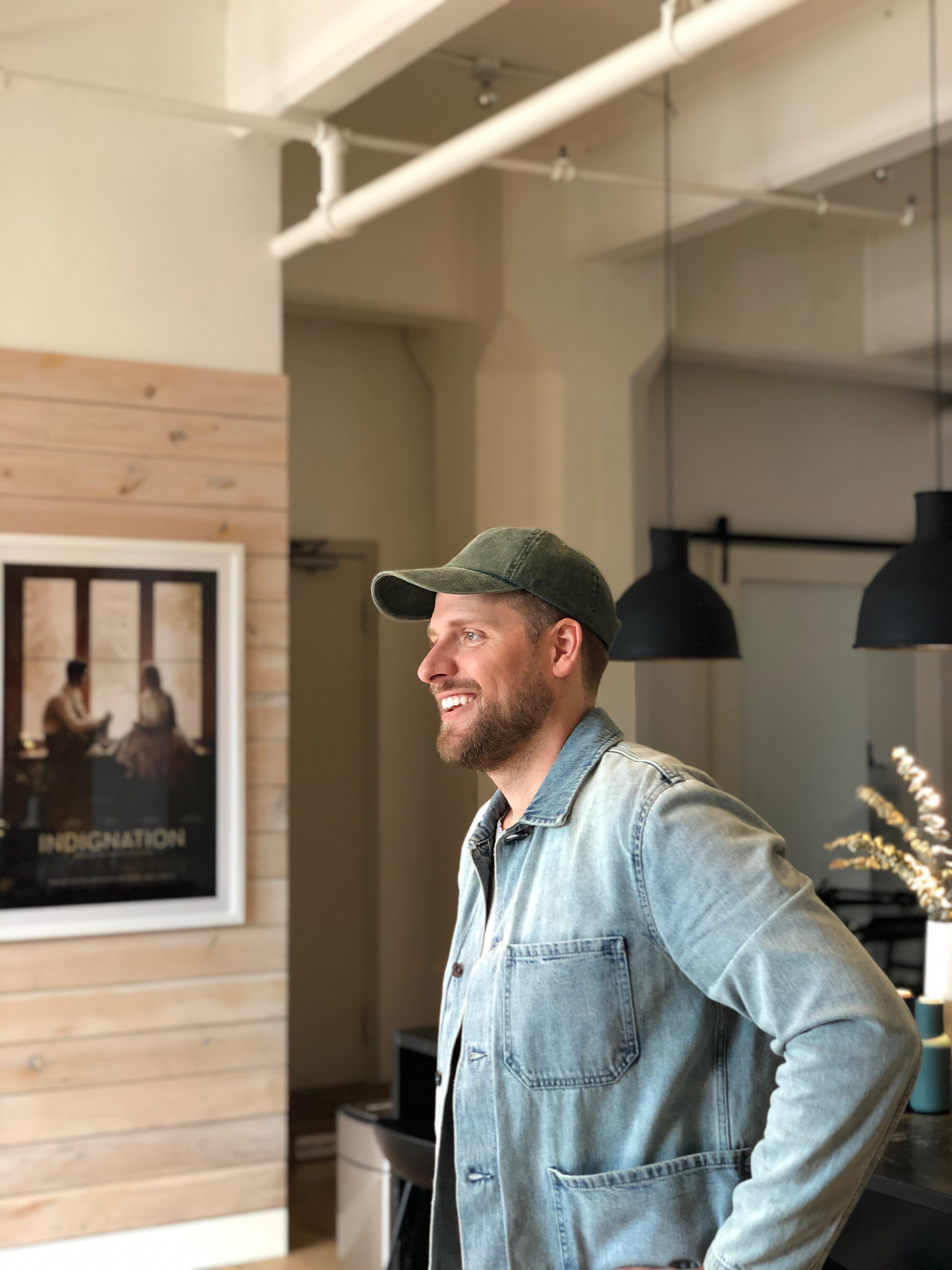
- Wadley in 2022
- Born: Edmond, Oklahoma, U.S.
- Education: Yale School of Music (MM)(AD); Oklahoma City University (BM)
- Occupations: Composer, music producer
- Years active: 2010–present
- Notable work: I'm Thinking of Ending Things, Swan Song, Driveways, Franklin
- Website: www.jaywadley.com

Jay Wadley is an American composer and music producer based in New York City, known for his work in film, television, and contemporary classical music. He is a two-time winner of the Charles Ives Award from the American Academy of Arts and Letters and was nominated twice at the Hollywood Music in Media Awards under the best original score category in 2020 and 2021.

== Early life and education ==
Wadley was born and raised in Edmond, Oklahoma. During his senior year at Edmond Memorial High School, he composed his first choir piece for 60 classmates to perform at a school talent show. After graduating in 2001, he studied music composition at Oklahoma City University under composer Edward Knight. After completing his undergraduate degree, Wadley pursued a Master's degree in Music Composition at the Yale School of Music studying under Aaron Jay Kernis, Martin Bresnick and Ezra Laderman. During his time at Yale, he also worked as an assistant manager at the Yale Center for Studies in Music Technology, taught undergraduate composition and contributed to various projects, including orchestral works with the Yale Philharmonia.

== Career ==
=== Film and television ===
Wadley is best known for composing the score for the 2020 film I'm Thinking of Ending Things, directed by Charlie Kaufman. The film, an adaptation of Iain Reid's novel, received critical acclaim, and Wadley's score was particularly praised for its haunting and atmospheric quality. Wadley incorporated orchestral textures and dissonant harmonies to reflect the film's psychological tension, drawing inspiration from avant-garde composers and classic Hollywood scores. In addition to composing the score, Wadley composed an original ballet for the film's climactic sequence, as well as a 1950s-style jingle and adaptations of songs from the musical Oklahoma!.

He also composed the score for the period drama series Franklin, which presented the challenge of creating a sound that matched the show's historical setting. For Franklin, Wadley combined period-accurate instrumentation with contemporary harmonic structures to evoke the era's historical depth while maintaining a modern sensibility.

In 2021, Wadley scored the film Swan Song, where his music was noted for its emotional depth and complementing the film's narrative. For Swan Song, Wadley utilized minimalistic piano motifs and ambient soundscapes to underscore the film's themes of memory and identity.

=== Other works ===
In addition to his film and television work, Wadley has been involved in contemporary classical compositions and live performances. He has collaborated with various orchestras, ensembles, and artists on projects that explore new sonic landscapes.

== Awards and recognition ==
Wadley's work has garnered industry recognition, including being featured twice in IndieWire's "10 Best Scores of the Year" lists. His score for Indignation was included in the 2016 list, while his work on Driveways and I'm Thinking of Ending Things earned him a spot on the 2020 list. His journey as a composer, from punk rock to scoring for Sundance-featured films, was profiled in an industry feature.

Award	Category	Film	Results	Ref.
ASCAP Film and Television Music Awards	Television Theme of the Year	Franklin	Nominated	
11th Hollywood Music in Media Awards	Best Original Score — Short Film (Live Action)	The Water Walker	Nominated	
12th Hollywood Music in Media Awards	Best Original Score — Short Film (Live Action)	The Box	Nominated	
Indiana Film Journalists Association Award	Best Musical Score	I'm Thinking of Ending Things	Nominated	

== Selected filmography ==
- Henry Johnson (2025)
- The Wedding Banquet (2025)
- Heart Eyes (2025)
- Franklin (2024)
- Before (2024)
- The Friend (2024)
- We Grown Now (2023)
- Fire Island (2022)
- Tell Me Lies (2022)
- Swan Song (2021)
- I'm Thinking of Ending Things (2020)
- Long Shot (2017)
- Indignation (2016)
- CrazySexyCool: The TLC Story (2013)
