= Josh Sharp =

American actor and writer

Josh Sharp is an actor and writer, best known for writing and starring in Dicks: The Musical.

== Early life ==
Sharp attended the University of North Carolina at Chapel Hill where he explored improv, musical theater, and comedy.

== Career ==
After graduating from college, Sharp moved to New York. In New York, Sharp met fellow comedians Bowen Yang, Matt Rogers, and Joel Kim Booster. He also met Aaron Jackson through Langan Kingsley. Sharp began performing with Upright Citizens Brigade in 2009. He and Aaron Jackson collaborated on several comedy pieces, including the Funny or Die video Series "Jared & Ivanka."

Sharp was a correspondent for The Opposition with Jordan Klepper in 2017. Comedy Central decided not to renew the show in 2018.

With Aaron Jackson, Sharp wrote and starred in the musical Fucking Identical Twins which played with Upright Citizens Brigade for more than a year. In 2016, the musical was optioned by 20th Century Fox for film adaptation. The film, Dicks: The Musical, premiered in 2023.

Sharp has appeared several times on the podcast Las Culturistas.

In 2025, Sharp premiered his one-man comedy show, "ta-da!", at the Greenwich House Theater. The 80-minute show, directed by Sam Pinkleton, features 2,000 PowerPoint slides, which Sharp memorized. Sharp received a 2026 Drama Desk nomination for Outstanding Solo Performance.

== Personal life ==
Sharp is gay. He enjoys reading. He is in a relationship with performer Blake Daniel.
