= Bowen Yang =

American comedian and actor (born 1990)

- 杨伯文
- Yang in 2025
- Born: November 6, 1990 (age 36); Brisbane, Queensland, Australia
- Citizenship: United States; Australia; Canada
- Education: New York University (BA)
- Occupations: Actor; comedian; writer; podcaster
- Years active: 2013–present

Chinese name
- Traditional Chinese: 楊伯文
- Simplified Chinese: 杨伯文
Transcriptions
Standard Mandarin
- Hanyu Pinyin: Yáng Bówén

Bowen Yang (Chinese: 杨伯文; born November 6, 1990) is an American comedian, actor, podcaster, and writer. Yang joined the NBC sketch comedy series Saturday Night Live as a staff writer in 2018, and was cast member for seven seasons from 2019 until his departure in 2025. He became the first SNL featured player to be nominated for a Primetime Emmy Award (in the Outstanding Supporting Actor in a Comedy Series category) in 2021, the same year he was promoted to repertory status.

Yang has appeared in the television series Girls5Eva, Ziwe, and The Other Two, and was recurring on Awkwafina Is Nora from Queens. He is also known for his appearances in the LGBTQ romantic comedies Fire Island and Bros, both released in 2022, and in the musical fantasy films Wicked (2024) and Wicked: For Good (2025). He co-hosts a comedy pop-culture podcast, Las Culturistas, with Matt Rogers. In January 2019, he was named to Forbes magazine's 30 Under 30 Hollywood & Entertainment list.

== Early life and education ==
Yang was born in Brisbane, Queensland, Australia, to a family that had emigrated from China in 1986. His father, Ruilin Yang, was raised in a rural village of Siziwang Banner, Inner Mongolia, growing up in a straw and mud hut. Yang's mother, Meng Su, is a retired physician from Shenyang who was an obstetrician-gynecologist before working in diagnostics. The couple moved to Brisbane so Ruilin could earn his doctorate in mining explosives.

Yang has an older sister. The children spoke Mandarin in their home, and attended Chinese school on Sundays. When Yang was six months old, the family moved to Canada and eventually settled in Brossard, Quebec, where Yang first discovered Saturday Night Live (SNL). As a child, he was drawn to late-night comedians and hosts David Letterman and Conan O'Brien.

When he was nine, the family moved to the United States, settling in Aurora, Colorado. At Smoky Hill High School, Yang's calculus teacher, Adrian Holguin, was also his coach for the school's improvisational comedy group, Spontaneous Combustion. He was named homecoming king and also voted "Most Likely to Be a Cast Member on Saturday Night Live". Yang graduated in 2008.

When he was seventeen, Yang's father found out his son was gay from an "open chat window" on the family's computer. His parents were not receptive to the news, stating that such things "did not happen in China". His father cried often over the revelation and, being non-religious but wanting to "solve problems", arranged for him to attend eight sessions of gay conversion therapy.

Yang agreed to attend the sessions to appease his parents, who said otherwise they would not allow him to move to New York to attend New York University, which his sister was already attending. He was immediately alarmed by the counselor's mix of religion and use of pseudo-scientific reasoning to explain away positive homosexual manifestations. In an interview for The New York Times, Maureen Dowd questioned why his parents, both scientists, did not see the disconnection. Yang said, "It was a cultural thing for them, this cultural value around masculinity, around keeping the family line going, keeping certain things holy and sacred." He also said, "It was me wanting to meet them halfway but realizing it had to be pretty absolute. It was an either-or thing."

In 2008, Yang moved to New York City and joined his sister at NYU. His father assigned her to chaperone him during this period as Bowen tried "straightness on for size and fail[ed] miserably". He came to accept being gay, incorporating it into his comedy, and hoped his parents would learn to accept that aspect of him. They have since reached a truce and enjoy a "great relationship". At NYU, he was in the improv group Dangerbox, and he occasionally performed with Stephanie Hsu, a member of the school's sketch comedy group.

Yang was inspired by Sandra Oh's character Cristina Yang on Grey's Anatomy for her neurotic and relentless pursuits, and aspired to be a doctor. He went to pre-med classes and graduated from NYU with a bachelor's degree in chemistry. After realizing he was actually inspired by Oh for her acting ability, he decided to pursue a career in comedy instead. At NYU, he met Matt Rogers, with whom he started Las Culturistas, a weekly comedy podcast where Yang "unapologetically expresses his personality, story and himself by sharing his experiences as a member of the LGBTQ community".

== Career ==
=== Early career ===
Yang taught himself Adobe Photoshop and graphic design software and later worked at One Kings Lane, a luxury interior and home design website, from 2013 to 2018 as a graphic designer. The company was flexible with Yang's time-off needs for comedy. Yang has also performed improv at the Upright Citizens Brigade. During this time, Yang designed graphics for his own shows and for his friends' comedy shows.

The podcast that Yang co-hosts with Matt Rogers, Las Culturistas, is described by Vulture as both "delightfully screwy" and a "two-headed snark routine". The podcast premiered in 2016 and as of September 2019, has over 300 episodes. Each one opens with an interview with a pop culture guest, then goes to one-minute rounds of "I Don't Think So, Honey!" (IDTSH) where the hosts and guests each expound on pet peeves. IDTSH has also morphed into its own live show. Yang credits the Las Culturistas podcast with Rogers for building his fanbase. In 2018 it was nominated for a Shorty Award recognizing the best in social media.

Yang appeared in shows such as Comedy Central's Broad City, a Vimeo web series The Outs, and the HBO web comedy High Maintenance. He was a supporting cast member in the 2019 film Isn't It Romantic. Yang performed stand-up on HBO's 2 Dope Queens. He played fashion designer Alexander Wang in a sketch series on Comedy Central, Up Next. In 2019, Yang received press coverage for his viral Twitter posts consisting of "expertly-timed lip-sync videos of famous movie scenes", in which he "reproduces dialogue from diva scenes" and well-known moments in popular culture. Past videos featured a monologue by Miranda Priestly in The Devil Wears Prada, Tyra Banks yelling at contestant Tiffany Richardson on America's Next Top Model, and a viral video of Cardi B talking about the 2019 government shutdown. Each garnered thousands of likes and retweets.

=== Saturday Night Live ===
==== Staff writer: 2018 ====
In 2018, Yang was hired as a staff writer on Saturday Night Live for the show's 44th season. He said he "always loved SNL growing up, but had trouble imagining himself on the show, because he'd never seen people who looked like him associated with the series". Yang has writing credits on 21 episodes of the show for the 2018–2019 season. His writing included: "GP Yass", a play on a vehicle's GPS navigation device that uses drag queens to deliver driving directions; and two sketches co-written with Julio Torres, which features Yang's talent for infusing "drama, tension, and exquisite backstory" into an everyday activity like paying bills in "Cheques" with Sandra Oh, and an actress doing a cameo in a gay pornography film, "The Actress" with Emma Stone. "The Actress" was hailed by Out as the "gayest SNL sketch of all time", and featured Stone as an earnest method actress taking her role as a cheated-on housewife too seriously alongside real-life gay porn actor Ty Mitchell. The pre-tape—so-called as it is filmed days ahead rather than acted live—was championed by Stone to be included on air. SNL creator Lorne Michaels knew Yang would be an on-air talent but wanted him to be comfortable on their stage first. Yang made a cameo appearance during the Sandra Oh/Tame Impala episode as North Korean leader Kim Jong-Un while Oh played his translator.

==== On-air cast: 2019–2025 ====
In September 2019, Yang was promoted to featured player for the 45th season, alongside improviser Chloe Fineman, both of whom were promoted to repertory status at the start of the show's 47th season in September 2021. Yang is the show's first ever Chinese-American cast member, and third gay male cast member after Terry Sweeney and John Milhiser.

SNL has had "little representation from Asian actors, as cast members or hosts" over several decades. Up until Yang's promotion, there had been only three cast members, (Note: Fred Armisen (2002–2013) had a Korean grandfather; Rob Schneider (1988–1994) had a Filipino grandmother; and Nasim Pedrad (2009–2014) was born in Tehran, Iran.) and six hosts who were of Asian descent. (Note: The six hosts have been: Jackie Chan and Lucy Liu in 2000; Aziz Ansari and Kumail Nanjiani in 2017; Awkwafina in 2018; and Sandra Oh in 2019.) A 2016 study of SNL revealed that 90% of 1975–2016's show hosts (826 total) were white, 6.8% were black, 1.2% were Hispanic, and 1.1% were labelled "other". Similarly, SNL has had comparatively low representation of LGBTQ on-air cast and guest hosts since the series started in 1975. Yang is the third gay male, and sixth LGBTQ cast member. (Note: Denny Dillon was a cast member during the 1980–1981 season, but was not out at the time. For the 1985–1986 season, Terry Sweeney was their first gay male cast member, John Milhiser was second, in the 2013–2014 cast; he was the fourth LGBTQ cast member overall; Danitra Vance was also in the 1985–1986 cast but was in the closet, all three left after one season; Kate McKinnon has been an out lesbian before becoming a cast member in 2012 and has continued to the present.) The announcement of Yang's casting on Saturday Night Live was reported internationally, and within hours was overshadowed by revelations that comedian Shane Gillis, who had been hired at the same time, aired homophobic and anti-Asian jokes. Gillis issued an apology, but within days was fired by SNL.

Yang's first episode as a regular cast member was the season's opening episode September 28, 2019, with host Woody Harrelson. Notably he was included in the show's cold open playing Kim Jong-un giving advice to Trump on handling the Ukraine controversy including the whistleblower who helped trigger the 2019 impeachment hearings. In other sketches, he portrayed Democratic presidential candidate Andrew Yang in a parody town hall debate, and was an extra in a mock movie trailer for Downton Abbey. In October 2019, Yang made his debut on Weekend Update (WU), as Chinese trade representative Chen "Trade Daddy" Biao in a segment about Donald Trump's trade war that was "brief, funny and took some clever satirical shots". Yang's Biao character returned to WU as the newly appointed health minister for the COVID-19 pandemic which he unconvincingly tries to assure China has in control. Perhaps his "filthiest" sketch, also co-written with friend Julio Torres, was for guest host Harry Styles as an incompetent Sara Lee Corporation social media manager who mixes up his own gay BDSM account on Instagram with the company's "wholesome bread brand". He was listed No. 2 in Variety's Power of Pride list of most influential queer artists in Hollywood in 2021. The same year, Yang was nominated for a Primetime Emmy Award for Outstanding Supporting Actor in a Comedy Series. He is the first featured player to ever be nominated. He also played NBA hall-of-famer Yao Ming in January 2022. Yang also played embattled Congressman George Santos in multiple sketches in which he received critical praise.

In 2021, Yang was applauded for speaking out on the recent surge in violence against Asian-Americans during a Weekend Update segment. He told audiences to "fuel up" (using the Chinese cheer Jiayou) and do more for Asian Americans. Also in 2021, he appeared on the Time 100, Time's annual list of the 100 most influential people in the world.

Yang departed the SNL cast in the show's 51st season, with a farewell sketch during the December 20, 2025 Christmas episode. In June 2026, Yang revealed that he was initially going to leave the show after the conclusion of its 50th season but show creator/showrunner Lorne Michaels asked him to stay on and mentor the new cast members due to the turnover period.

Yang returned to SNL on the November 16th, 2026 episode of SNL, portraying Jensen Huang in a sketch.

==== Other work ====
Yang in 2025.

Yang plays Nora Lin's mobile app-developer cousin in the Comedy Central sitcom Awkwafina Is Nora from Queens, which premiered in January 2020 and was renewed for a third season in 2022. Yang is a writer on the Apple TV+ musical comedy series Schmigadoon!, which stars his former SNL castmate Cecily Strong. In September 2021, he appeared as a guest on the NPR news quiz Wait Wait... Don't Tell Me! In 2022 he starred in Fire Island, written by and co-starring his close friend Joel Kim Booster, whom he met at the beginning of his comedy career. He appeared in the 2022 film Bros and is part of the cast of Dicks: The Musical with Aaron Jackson, Josh Sharp, and Megan Thee Stallion. Yang appears as Pfannee in the first part, released in 2024, of the two-part film adaptation of the musical Wicked. He reprised the role in its sequel, Wicked: For Good, the following year.

Yang is a signatory of the Film Workers for Palestine boycott pledge, which was published in September 2025.

Yang made his Broadway debut on September 15, 2026, in Oh, Mary! as the title role of Mary Todd Lincoln. He will hold this role for a temporary, 12-week engagement.

In November 2026, Yang drew criticism after a resurfaced clip from an October 2026 episode of Las Culturistas showed him referring to Jewish singer Regina Spektor as "Zio", which TheWrap described as an antisemitic slur popularized by former Ku Klux Klan leader David Duke. Commentators and Jewish advocacy leaders, including Meghan McCain, Michael Rapaport, and Amy Spitalnick, condemned the remark. In a statement on social media, Yang apologized, stating, "Particularly upsetting to realize that I adopted language popularized by far-right movements whose rhetoric we should be wary of and act against."

== Filmography ==
=== Film ===
Key
†	Denotes films that have not yet been released

Year	Title	Role	Notes	Ref.
2019	Isn't It Romantic	Donny's Guy		
2020	Cicada	Hudson		
2022	The Lost City	Ray the Moderator		
2022	Fire Island	Howie		
2022	Bros	Lawrence Grape		
2022	Night at the Museum: Kahmunrah Rises Again	Ronnie	Voice role	
2023	The Monkey King	Dragon King	Voice role	
2023	Dicks: The Musical	God		
2023	Please Don't Destroy: The Treasure of Foggy Mountain	Deetch Nordwind		
2023	Good Burger 2	Himself		
2024	The Tiger's Apprentice	Sidney	Voice role	
2024	The Garfield Movie	Nolan	Voice role	
2024	Wicked	Pfannee		
2025	The Wedding Banquet	Chris		
2025	Wicked: For Good	Pfannee		
2026	Tangles	Dale	Voice role	
2026	The Cat in the Hat	Gary	Voice role	

=== Television ===
Year	Title	Role	Notes	Ref.
2016	Broad City	Sales Associate	2 episodes	
2016	The Outs	Jason	4 episodes	
2018	High Maintenance	Brian	Episode: "Globo"	
2019	Jon Glaser Loves Gear	Bowen	Episode: "Survival"	
2019–present	Late Night with Seth Meyers	Himself	7 episodes	
2019–2025	Saturday Night Live	Himself/Various roles	126 episodes	
2020–2023	Awkwafina Is Nora from Queens	Edmund	17 episodes	
2020	Unbreakable Kimmy Schmidt	Kim Jong-un	Special: "Kimmy vs the Reverend"	
2020	Archer	Win Li (voice)	Episode: "Bloodsploosh"	
2021	Girls5eva	Zander	2 episodes	
2021	Ziwe	Himself	Episode: "Wealth Hoarders"	
2021	The Other Two	Himself	Episode: "Chase & Pat Are Killing It"	
2021	Ten Year Old Tom	(voice)	Episode: "The Spelling Bee is Rigged/Dakota's Dad"	
2022	The Kardashians	Himself	Episode: "Life from New York"	
2022	Duncanville	(voice)	2 episodes	
2023	HouseBroken	Lonnie (voice)	Episode: "Who's a Homeowner?"	
2023	The Simpsons	Richard (voice)	Episode: "Homer's Adventures Through the Windshield Glass"	
2023	RuPaul's Drag Race All Stars	Himself	Guest judge; Episode: "Snatch Game of Love"	
2023	RuPaul's Drag Race All Stars: Untucked	Himself	Special guest; Episode: "All Stars Untucked: Snatch Game of Love"	
2023	Scott Pilgrim Takes Off	TV Gossip No. 2 (voice)	Episode: "Whatever"	
2023–2024	Gremlins: Secrets of the Mogwai	Celestrial Administrator (voice)	5 episodes	
2024	Fantasmas	Dodo	2 episodes	
2024	Jentry Chau vs. the Underworld	Ed (voice)	13 episodes	
2024	Monsters at Work	Carter (voice)	2 episodes	
2024–2025	The Second Best Hospital in the Galaxy	Various voices	9 episodes	
2025	Overcompensating	Davis	2 episodes	
2025	Moon Girl and Devil Dinosaur	Martin Li / Mister Negative (voice)	Episode: "Party Girl"	
2025	Las Culturistas Culture Awards	Himself / Host	TV Special	

=== Writer ===
Year	Title	Notes	Ref.
2018–2019	Saturday Night Live	21 episodes	
2019	76th Golden Globe Awards		
2021	Schmigadoon!	Episode: "Cross That Bridge"	
2025	Las Culturistas Culture Awards	TV Special	

=== Theater ===
Year	Title	Notes	Ref.
2026	Titanique	Co-producer	
2026	Oh, Mary!	Starring as Mary Todd Lincoln; Broadway debut	

== Accolades ==
In 2025, he became the most-nominated Asian male performer in Emmy history with his fourth nomination for NBC's Saturday Night Live. Only Sandra Oh has more Emmy nominations among Asian performers.

- 2019 – Forbes 30 Under 30 Hollywood & Entertainment list
- 2019 – Out 100 Entertainer of the Year list
- 2020 – Human Rights Campaign Visibility Award
- 2021 – People Sexiest Man Alive
- 2021 – Variety Power of Pride list
- 2021 – Time 100 Most Influential People
- 2021 – Just for Laughs Breakout Comedy Star of the Year
- 2025 – Academy Museum of Motion Pictures Vantage Award

Awards nominations
Year	Association	Work	Category	Result	Ref.
2019	Primetime Emmy Awards	Saturday Night Live	Outstanding Writing for a Variety Series	Nominated	
2021	Primetime Emmy Awards	Saturday Night Live	Outstanding Supporting Actor in a Comedy Series	Nominated	
2022	Primetime Emmy Awards	Saturday Night Live	Outstanding Supporting Actor in a Comedy Series	Nominated	
2024	Primetime Emmy Awards	Saturday Night Live	Outstanding Supporting Actor in a Comedy Series	Nominated	
2025	Primetime Emmy Awards	Saturday Night Live	Outstanding Supporting Actor in a Comedy Series	Nominated	
2019	Writers Guild of America Awards	Saturday Night Live	Comedy/Variety Sketch Series	Nominated	
2020	Writers Guild of America Awards	Saturday Night Live	Comedy/Variety Sketch Series	Nominated	
2021	Dorian Awards	Saturday Night Live	Best Supporting TV Performance	Nominated	
2021	Dorian Awards	Saturday Night Live	Best TV Musical Performance "Pride Month Song"	Nominated	
2021	Dorian Awards	Saturday Night Live	Best TV Musical Performance "Loverboy"	Nominated	
2022	Hollywood Critics Association Awards	Saturday Night Live	Best Supporting Actor in a Broadcast Network or Cable Series, Comedy	Nominated	
2022	Critics Choice Awards	Saturday Night Live	Best Supporting Actor in a Comedy Series	Nominated	
2022	Gotham Awards	Fire Island	Ensemble Tribute	Won	
2023	iHeartRadio Podcast Awards	Las Culturistas	Podcast of the Year	Won	
2023	iHeartRadio Podcast Awards	Las Culturistas	Best Comedy Podcast	Nominated	
2025	Screen Actors Guild Awards	Wicked	Outstanding Performance by a Cast in a Motion Picture	Nominated	
2026	Tony Awards	Titanique	Best Musical	Nominated	

== See also ==
- LGBT culture in New York City
- List of LGBT people from New York City
