= Spa Night =

2016 film by Andrew Ahn

- Theatrical release poster
- Directed by: Andrew Ahn
- Written by: Andrew Ahn
- Produced by: David Ariniello; Giulia Caruso; Ki Jin Kim; Kelly Thomas
- Starring: Joe Seo; Haerry Kim; Youn Ho Cho
- Cinematography: Ki Jin Kim
- Edited by: Yannis Chalkiadakis
- Production companies: Nonetheless Productions; Extraordinary Renditions; First Birthday
- Distributed by: Strand Releasing
- Release dates: January 24, 2016 (Sundance); August 19, 2016 (United States)
- Running time: 93 minutes
- Country: United States
- Languages: Korean; English
- Box office: $40,294

Spa Night is a 2016 American coming-of-age drama film written and directed by Andrew Ahn (in his feature directorial debut). It stars Joe Seo, Haerry Kim, and Youn Ho Cho. The story centers on a closeted Korean-American teenager who, living with his financially struggling immigrant parents, stumbles upon a secret cruising spot when he takes a job at an all-male spa.

The film premiered at the Sundance Film Festival on January 24, 2016, where Seo won the U.S. Dramatic Special Jury Award for Breakthrough Performance. It was given a limited theatrical release in the United States by Strand Releasing on August 19, 2016. It received positive reviews from critics and won the John Cassavetes Award at the 32nd Independent Spirit Awards.

== Plot ==
David Cho, a closeted eighteen-year-old, lives in Koreatown, Los Angeles, with his father Jin and his mother Soyoung, both Korean immigrants to the United States. When Soyoung and Jin sell their restaurant, David is unable to work there anymore. To help him prepare for college, David's parents enroll him in expensive, intensive classes. David shadows his old friend Eddie's dorm room at the University of Southern California (USC) for two days at Eddie's mother's request.

David and Eddie visit a Korean all-male spa. While in the sauna, David secretly stares at Eddie's naked body. David placates Eddie and his male friend by downplaying the incident, claiming he was staring at nothing. The following day, when Jin does not arrive, David rides a bus instead of letting Eddie drive him home. David returns home to find Jin asleep with empty beer bottles beside him.

Soyoung works as a full-time waitress to continue supporting the family, but Jin fails to secure a permanent job. David struggles academically, especially at SATs, affecting his chances of being admitted to desirable colleges such as USC. To support his parents, David starts working at the Korean all-male spa; he hides his employment from his parents, secretly gives them his earnings, and falsely tells them he has done well academically.

Eventually, David discovers and becomes aroused by an illicit gay sex act during one of his post-work spa rests. He secretly masturbates in a restroom stall but is interrupted by a patron knocking on the stall, flushing the toilet, and exiting. Later, while cleaning, he foresees another illicit sex act and hangs a "closed for cleaning" sign on the door of a room where such activity would occur. Later, David and an older man stare at each other, but David discreetly tells him: "No touching".

When one of the sex acts is reported to police, David reluctantly posts a notice warning those caught in an illicit act, but he posts it without interrupting in a room where another sex act occurs. A few days later, David interrupts two men's sexual activity and ejects them from their room by removing a towel from a wall light.

One night, after Soyoung confronts Jin for being increasingly drunk and still unemployed, David takes his drunken father to the spa where David still secretly works. While Jin is sleeping, David has sex with a patron, and the spa manager catches him trying to kiss the man, causing David to sob uncontrollably. When leaving the spa, David apologizes in Korean to the irate spa manager and throws a locker key onto the counter. David does differently from his usual activities. In a church, David stands up and neither sits nor sings with the congregation. On a street, he runs instead of jogging.

== Cast ==
- Joe Seo as David Cho
- Haerry Kim as Soyoung
- Youn Ho Cho as Jin
- Tae Song as Eddie Baek
- Ho Young Chung as Spa Manager
- Linda Han as Mrs. Baek
- Eric Jeong as Peter
- Janice Pak as Stella
- Angie Kim as Esther Kang
- Kahyun Kim as Grace
- Sun Park as Mrs. Kim
- Chris Yejin as Korean Counter Woman
- Yong Kim as Academy Director
- Esteban Andres Cruz as Boyish Mexican Man
- David Pevsner as Fit Man
- Jose A. Solorio as Luis

== Production ==
Filmmaker Andrew Ahn and his production team originally scheduled June 2014 for filming but were unable to obtain a first investor. Thus, the producers opened a Kickstarter fundraising campaign in October 2014. The funding reached its US$62,000 goal by then. They further received an additional US$35,000, especially from interested investors who saw the goal reached.

The script's early draft lasted thirty pages, primarily set in a spa. Ahn added Korean "culture, Koreatown, and the character’s family" into the film to further develop "the intersection of gay and Korean identity" and to avoid sexuality from being the film's only theme.

== Release ==
The film was first screened at the 2016 Sundance Film Festival in the United States, then the Jeonju International Film Festival in South Korea, BAMcinemaFest (Brooklyn Academy of Music), Outfest Los Angeles, and other film festivals, like ones in Seattle and Sydney, Australia. It was then publicly screened in the Metrograph theatre (New York City) on August 19, 2026, and then the Sundance Sunset theatre (West Hollywood) on August 26, the following week. Strand Releasing released the film on physical and digital home media in the United States later that year.

== Reception ==
=== Critical response ===
On the review aggregator website Rotten Tomatoes, 96% of 25 critics' reviews are positive, with an average rating of 6.8/10. The website's consensus reads: "In depicting one man's sexual awakening, Spa Night explores the tension between tradition and individuality with tenderness and compassion." Metacritic, which uses a weighted average, assigned the film a score of 76 out of 100, based on 13 critics, indicating "generally favorable" reviews.

Stephen Holden of The New York Times described Spa Night as "a contemplation of the loneliness, tension and anxiety of outsiders pursuing a piece of the American dream" and "a looming family tragedy of immigrants desperately trying to maintain a foothold in an oppressive, upwardly mobile and conformist subculture."

Sheri Linden of the Los Angeles Times called the film "erotically charged, quietly devastating" and praised that Seo's "sensitive lead performance affectingly expresses the tension between tradition and personal identity."

Nigel M. Smith of The Guardian gave the film 3 out of 5 stars and remarked, "Ahn's muted approach to his material, coupled with the passivity of the film's lead character, leaves Spa Night feeling too cold to fully engage." Smith also commented, "Despite its setting and Korean American cast, Spa Night unfurls in a largely expected manner."

Boyd van Hoeij of The Hollywood Reporter stated, "Ahn subtly teases out his protagonist's inner struggle, often by letting David interact with the small but fine-grained gallery of supporting characters."

Peter Debruge of Variety opined, "Cruising is a tricky dynamic to capture onscreen, and Spa Night only partially succeeds, concerned more with David's bystander curiosity than the sophisticated nonverbal seduction going on around him. Then again, Ahn doesn't aim to sensationalize."

Kate Erbland of IndieWire gave the film a grade of "B-" and noted, "The beautifully lensed drama is, like its protagonist, compelled and often obsessed by the human shape and form, and Ahn's film artfully uses the physical to tell a mostly standard issue coming-of-age story with style."

Sheila O'Malley of RogerEbert.com gave Spa Night 3 out of 4 stars and wrote, "The film is admirable in presenting the issues a gay kid faces in an extremely specific environment, and for resisting a more conventional storyline."

=== Accolades ===
Award	Date	Category	Recipient(s)	Result	Ref.
Boston LGBT Film Festival	March 31–April 10, 2016	Jury Prize for Best Narrative Feature	Andrew Ahn	Won	
Florida Film Critics Circle Awards	December 23, 2016	Best First Film	Spa Night	Nominated	
GLAAD Media Awards	May 6, 2017	Outstanding Film - Limited Release	Spa Night	Nominated	
Independent Spirit Awards	February 25, 2017	John Cassavetes Award	Andrew Ahn, David Ariniello, Giulia Caruso, Ki Jin Kim, Kelly Thomas	Won	
Independent Spirit Awards	February 25, 2017	Someone to Watch Award	Andrew Ahn	Nominated	
Inside Out Toronto LGBT Film Festival	May 26–June 5, 2016	Best First Feature	Andrew Ahn	Won	
Nashville Film Festival	April 14–23, 2016	New Directors Competition	Andrew Ahn	Nominated	
Outfest Los Angeles	July 7–17, 2016	Grand Jury Award for Outstanding Performance	Joe Seo	Won	
Philadelphia Film Festival	October 20–30, 2016	Best First Feature	Andrew Ahn	Nominated	
San Diego Asian Film Festival	November 3–12, 2016	George C. Lin Emerging Filmmaker Award	Andrew Ahn	Won	
Sundance Film Festival	January 21–31, 2016	Special Jury Award for Breakthrough Performance	Joe Seo	Won	
Sundance Film Festival	January 21–31, 2016	Grand Jury Prize Dramatic	Andrew Ahn	Nominated	
